= Derry Intermediate Hurling Championship =

Annual hurling competition for Intermediate clubs in Derry

- Irish: Craobhchomórtas Idirmhéanach Iomána Dhoire
- Code: Hurling
- Region: Derry (GAA)
- No. of teams: 8
- Title holders: Lavey (2nd title)
- Most titles: Swatragh (6)
- Sponsors: Leadon Timber Frame
- Official website: Derry GAA

The Derry Intermediate Hurling Championship (known for sponsorship reasons as the Leadon Timber Frame Derry Intermediate Hurling Championship and abbreviated to the Derry IHC) is an annual hurling competition organised by the Derry County Board of the Gaelic Athletic Association for the second tier hurling teams in County Londonderry in Northern Ireland.

The winner of the Derry Intermediate Hurling Championship qualifies for the subsequent Ulster Intermediate Club Championship.

Lavey are the title holders after defeating Banagher by 1-17 to 0-15 in the 2026 final.

== Format ==
The format of the championship was changed in 2026. Currently, there is no group phase. Instead a knock-out format with a back-door for the intermediate and junior title is established.

=== Round 1 ===
8 teams are participating in 4 matches. The 4 winners advance to Qualifier 1 A, the 4 losers to Qualifier 1B.

=== Qualifier 1A ===
The 4 winners of Round 1 are participating. The 2 winners qualifiy for the Senior final. The 2 losers advance to the IHC/JHC qualifier.

=== Qualifier 1B ===
The 4 losers of Round 1 are participating. The 2 winners advance to the IHC/JHC qualifier.

=== IHC/JHC qualifier ===
The 4 teams with 1 win and 1 loss in the previous rounds are participating. The 2 winners qualify for the Intermediate final. The 2 losers to the Junior final

=== Senior / Intermediate / Junior final ===
The 6 teams qualifying for the 3 finals determine the Champions of the 3 tiers.

== Teams ==
=== 2026 Teams ===
8 clubs were eligible to compete in the 2026 Derry Intermediate Hurling Championship:

Team	Location	Colours	Position in 2026	Championship titles	Last championship title
Ballinascreen	Draperstown	Maroon and white	Junior runners-up	1	2023
Banagher	Feeny / Park	Maroon and white	Intermediate runners-up	2	2021
Eoghan Rua	Coleraine	Maroon and green	Qualifier	1	2022
Kevin Lynch's	Dungiven	White and black	Senior runners-up	0	—
Lavey	Lavey	Orange and black	Intermediate champions	2	2026
Na Magha	Derry	Green, white, and black	Qualifier	0	—
Slaughtneil	Slaughtneil	Maroon and white	Senior champions	0	—
Swatragh	Swatragh	Green and white	Junior champion	4	2025

== Qualification for subsequent competitions ==
The Derry Intermediate Championship winners qualify for the subsequent Ulster Intermediate Club Hurling Championship.

== List of finals ==
=== Legend ===
- Gold – Ulster intermediate club champions
- Silver – Ulster intermediate club runners-up

=== List of Derry IHC finals from 2017 onwards ===
Year	Winners		Runners-up		Venue	#
Year	Club	Score	Club	Score	Venue	#
2026	Lavey	1-17	Banagher	0-15	Derry Centre of Excellence	
2025	Swatragh	2-13	Ballinascreen	1-07	Derry Centre of Excellence	
2024	Swatragh	2-10	Kevin Lynch's	0-11	Derry Centre of Excellence	
2023	Ballinascreen	3-16	Eoghan Rua	0-05	Derry Centre of Excellence	
2022	Eoghan Rua	3-09	Ballinascreen	2-11	Derry Centre of Excellence	
2021	Banagher	0-13	Lavey	0-11	Derry Centre of Excellence	
2020	Swatragh	2-13	Ballinascreen	2-09	Derry Centre of Excellence	
2019	Banagher	0-21	Swatragh	0-08	Derry Centre of Excellence	
2018	Swatragh	0-17	Ballinascreen	2-16	Derry Centre of Excellence	
2017	Lavey	0-16	Swatragh	0-12	Derry Centre of Excellence	

== See also ==
- Derry Senior Hurling Championship
- Derry Junior Hurling Championship
