= Derry Junior Hurling Championship =

Annual hurling competition for junior clubs in Derry

- Irish: Craobhchomórtas Shóisearach Iomána Dhoire
- Code: Hurling
- Region: Derry (GAA)
- No. of teams: 8
- Title holders: Swatragh (2nd title)
- Most titles: Lavey (3 titles)
- Sponsors: Leadon Timber Frame
- Official website: Derry GAA

The Derry Junior Hurling Championship (known for sponsorship reasons as the Leadon Timber Frame Derry Junior Hurling Championship and abbreviated to the Derry JHC) is an annual hurling competition organised by the Derry County Board of the Gaelic Athletic Association for the third tier hurling teams in County Londonderry in Northern Ireland.

The winner of the Derry Junior Hurling Championship qualifies for the subsequent Ulster Junior Club Championship.

Swatragh are the title holders after defeating Ballinascreen by 3–30 to 4–22 in the 2026 final.

== Format ==
The format of the championship was changed in 2026. Currently, there is no group phase. Instead a knock-out format with a back-door for the intermediate and junior title is established.

=== Round 1 ===
8 teams are participating in 4 matches. The 4 winners advance to Qualifier 1 A, the 4 losers to Qualifier 1B.

=== Qualifier 1A ===
The 4 winners of Round 1 are participating. The 2 winners qualifiy for the Senior final. The 2 losers advance to the IHC/JHC qualifier.

=== Qualifier 1B ===
The 4 losers of Round 1 are participating. The 2 winners advance to the IHC/JHC qualifier.

=== IHC/JHC qualifier ===
The 4 teams with 1 win and 1 loss in the previous rounds are participating. The 2 winners qualify for the Intermediate final. The 2 losers to the Junior final

=== Senior / Intermediate / Junior final ===
The 6 teams qualifying for the 3 finals determine the Champions of the 3 tiers.

== Qualification for subsequent competitions ==
The Derry Junior Championship winners qualify for the subsequent Ulster Junior Club Hurling Championship. A team can only progress to the Ulster series of games in their respective grade if they retain their championship status from the previous season, or if they drop one grade. A senior team from the previous season cannot compete in Ulster at Junior level.

== Roll of honour ==
=== By club ===
#	Club	Titles	Runners-up	Championships won	Championships runner-up
1	Lavey	3	1	2020, 2022, 2025	2024
2	Swatragh	2	0	2023, 2026	—
3	Na Magha	1	2	2021	2019, 2022
3	Eoghan Rua	1	1	2019	2021
3	Ballinascreen	1	1	2024	2026
6	Banagher	0	3	—	2020, 2023, 2025

== List of finals ==
=== Legend ===
- Gold – Ulster Junior Club Champions
- Silver – Ulster Junior Club Runners-up

Year	Winners		Runners-up	
Year	Club	Score	Club	Score
2026	Swatragh	3-30	Ballinascreen	4-22
2025	Lavey	1-16	Banagher	1-07
2024	Ballinascreen	2–16	Lavey	1–17
2023	Swatragh	3–17	Banagher	0-22
2022	Lavey	2-24	Na Magha	0–13
2021	Na Magha	w/o	Eoghan Rua	scr
2020	Lavey	2–13	Banagher	0–15
2019	Eoghan Rua	0–16	Na Magha	1-09

== See also ==
- Derry Senior Hurling Championship (Tier 1)
- Derry Intermediate Hurling Championship (Tier 2)
