= 2026 Derry Senior Hurling Championship =

Annual hurling competition season

- Dates: 15 August - 20 September 2026
- Teams: 8
- Sponsor: Leadon Timber Frame
- Champions: Slaughtneil (20th title)
- Runners-up: Kevin Lynch's

Tournament statistics
- Matches played: 13

The 2026 Derry Senior Hurling Championship is the 81st staging of the Derry Senior Hurling Championship since its establishment by the Derry County Board in 1887. The championship is scheduled to run from 15 August until 20 September 2026.

Slaughtneil are the defending champions, having won the 2025 title.

Slaughtneil beat Kevin Lynch's 0-20 - 1-14 to claim their 20th championship and their 14th title in a row.

== Format change ==
The format of the 2026 championship was changed compared to the previous years. There is no more group phase. Instead a knock-out format with a back-door for the intermediate and junior title is established.

=== Round 1 ===
8 teams are participating in 4 matches. The 4 winners advance to Qualifier 1 A, the 4 losers to Qualifier 1B.

=== Qualifier 1A ===
The 4 winners of Round 1 are participating. The 2 winners qualifiy for the Senior final. The 2 losers advance to the IHC/JHC qualifier.

=== Qualifier 1B ===
The 4 losers of Round 1 are participating. The 2 winners advance to the IHC/JHC qualifier.

=== IHC/JHC qualifier ===
The 4 teams with 1 win and 1 loss in the previous rounds are participating. The 2 winners qualify for the Intermediate final. The 2 losers to the Junior final

=== Senior / Intermediate / Junior final ===
The 6 teams qualifying for the 3 finals determine the Champions of the 3 tiers.

== Championship ==
=== Round 1 ===
15 August Round 1	Kevin Lynch's	3-16 - 1-15	Lavey	Davitt Park
		Report

15 August Round 1	Slaughtneil	4-34 - 0-03	Na Magha	Davitt Park
		Report

16 August Round 1	Swatragh	6-23 - 0-06	Eoghan Rua	Lavey Grounds
		Report

16 August Round 1	Ballinascreen	1-13 - 1-16	Banagher	Lavey Grounds
		Report

=== Qualifier 1A ===
21 August Qualifier 1A	Kevin Lynch's	1-22 - 1-20	Swatragh	Banagher
	T McHugh 1-2, R Mullan 0-4 (4f, 1 65), P O’Kane 0-3, N Ferris, C O’Reilly, C Kelly, D McGilligan 0-2, O McElhinney, M Craig, KB Mullan, O McKeever and C McCloskey 0-1 each	Report	S Walsh 0-6 (5f), J Friel 0-5f, D Bradley 1-2, T Walsh, Conor Murray 0-2 each, Cahal Murray, C Quinn and J McKeagney 0-1 each

22 August Qualifier 1A	Slaughtneil	5-26 - 0-09	Banagher	Celtic Park
	Shea Cassidy 3-6 (2f), E Cassidy 1-4, Shane McGuigan 0-4, C O’Doherty 1-0, B Rogers, M McGuigan 0-3 each, C Coyle 0-2, C McKaigue, C Ó Mianáin, G Bradley and E Boylan 0-1 each	Report	D Cartin 0-6 (5f), F Cartin, T McCloskey and R Biggs 0-1 each

=== Qualifier 1B ===
21 August Qualifier 1B	Lavey	2-25 - 0-11	Eoghan Rua	Celtic Park

22 August Qualifier 1B	Na Magha	2-10 - 1-22	Ballinascreen	Celtic Park

=== IHC/JHC Qualifier ===
13 September IHC/JHC Qualifier	Swatragh	1-13 - 1-17	Lavey	Owenbeg
		Report

13 September IHC/JHC Qualifier	Banagher	0-14 - 0-12	Ballinascreen	Owenbeg
		Report

=== Junior final ===
20 September Final	Swatragh	3-30 - 4-22	Ballinascreen	Owenbeg
		Report

=== Intermediate final ===
20 September Final	Lavey	1-17 - 0-15	Banagher	Owenbeg
		Report

=== Senior final ===
20 September Final	Kevin Lynch's	1-14 - 0-20	Slaughtneil	Owenbeg
		Report
