= 2024 Derry Senior Hurling Championship =

Annual hurling competition season

- Dates: 10 August - 26 October 2024
- Teams: 8
- Sponsor: Leadon Timber Frame
- Champions: Slaughtneil (18th title); Mark McGuigan (captain)
- Runners-up: Banagher

Tournament statistics
- Matches played: 19
- Goals scored: 48 (2.53 per match)
- Points scored: 508 (26.74 per match)
- Top scorer(s): Cormac O'Doherty (0-34)

The 2024 Derry Senior Hurling Championship was the 79th staging of the Derry Senior Hurling Championship since its establishment by the Derry County Board in 1887. The championship ran from 10 August to 26 October 2024.

Slaughtneil were the defending champions.

The final was played on 26 October 2024 at Owenbeg, between Slaughtneil and Banagher. Slaughtneil won the match by 0-16 to 0-04 to claim their 18th championship title overall and a 12th consecutive title.

Slaughtneil's Cormac O'Doherty was the championship's top scorer with 0-34.

== Group A ==
=== Group A table ===
Senior playoffs Junior playoffs

Team	Matches				Score			Pts
Team	Pld	W	D	L	For	Against	Diff	Pts
Swatragh	3	2	1	0	75	33	42	5
Kevin Lynch's	3	2	1	0	75	36	39	5
Eoghan Rua	3	1	0	2	33	80	-47	2
Na Magha	3	0	0	3	36	70	-34	0

=== Group A results ===
10 August 2024 Round 1	Kevin Lynch's	1-12 - 0-15	Swatragh	Owenbeg

10 August 2024 Round 1	Eoghan Rua	1-13 - 1-11	Na Magha	Owenbeg Centre of Excellence

25 August 2024 Round 2	Eoghan Rua	1-06 - 6-15	Swatragh	Eoghan Rua Grounds

3 September 2024 Round 2	Na Magha	1-10 - 2-21	Kevin Lynch's	Owenbeg

8 September 2024 Round 3	Swatragh	3-18 - 0-09	Na Magha	Davitt Park

8 September 2024 Round 3	Kevin Lynch's	5-18 - 1-05	Eoghan Rua	Páirc Chaoimhín Uí Loingisgh

== Group B ==
=== Group B table ===
Senior playoffs Junior playoffs

Team	Matches				Score			Pts
Team	Pld	W	D	L	For	Against	Diff	Pts
Slaughtneil	3	3	0	0	88	33	55	6
Banagher	3	2	0	1	48	59	-11	4
Lavey	3	0	1	2	47	64	-17	1
Ballinascreen	3	0	1	2	53	70	-27	1

=== Group B results ===
11 August 2024 Round 1	Slaughtneil	3-22 - 1-10	Ballinascreen	Emmet Park

11 August 2024 Round 1	Banagher	2-14 - 0-16	Lavey	Fr McNally Park

24 August 2024 Round 2	Lavey	1-15 - 1-15	Ballinascreen	Owenbeg

24 August 2024 Round 2	Slaughtneil	3-22 - 0-07	Banagher	Owenbeg Centre of Excellence

8 September 2024 Round 3	Lavey	0-13 - 2-20	Slaughtneil	Lavey Grounds

8 September 2024 Round 3	Ballinascreen	0-12 - 1-18	Banagher	Dean McGlinchey Park

== Knockout stage ==
=== Junior playoffs ===
28 September 2024 Playoff	Eoghan Rua	0-07 - 2-17	Ballinascreen	Owenbeg

28 September 2024 Playoff	Lavey	1-17 - 1-11	Na Magha	Owenbeg Centre of Excellence

=== Senior playoffs ===
29 September 2024 Playoff	Swatragh	0-10 - 2-10	Banagher	Owenbeg

29 September 2024 Playoff	Slaughtneil	0-22 - 0-14	Kevin Lynch's	Owenbeg Centre of Excellence

=== Junior final ===
20 October 2024 Final	Lavey	1-17 - 2-16	Ballinascreen	Owenbeg
	R McGill (0-8, 6f), F Bradley (0-5, 4f), S Melaugh (1-0), C Melaugh (0-2), E Mulholland (0-1), A Duffin (0-1).	Report	E Conway (0-6, 4f 1‘65), M Bradley (1-2), R McSorley (1-1), P Cleary (0-3), R Scullion (0-2), C Doyle (0-1), N Rafferty (0-1).

=== Intermediate final ===
26 October 2024 Final	Swatragh	2-10 - 0-11	Kevin Lynch's	Owenbeg
	J Friel (0-6, 5f), C Murray (1-1), SM Quinn (1-0), PJ O'Connell (0-2), C Quinn (0-1).	Report	R Mullan (0-4, 3f), R Mullan (0-2), S Kelly (0-2), D McGilligan (0-2), N McGonigle (0-1).

=== Senior final ===
20 October 2024 Final	Banagher	0-04 - 0-16	Slaughtneil	Owenbeg
	D Cartin (0-2), C O’Kane, F McGilligan (0-1 each).	Report	C O’Doherty 0-9 (7f), Sé McGuigan 0-2, R O Mianáin 0-2, J Cassidy, B Rogers, Shane McGuigan (01 each).
