= 2025 Derry Senior Hurling Championship =

Annual hurling competition season

- Dates: 8 August - 8 October 2025
- Teams: 8
- Sponsor: Leadon Timber Frame
- Champions: Slaughtneil (19th title); Mark McGuigan (captain); Paul McCormack (manager)
- Runners-up: Kevin Lynch's

Tournament statistics
- Matches played: 18
- Goals scored: 49 (2.72 per match)
- Points scored: 591 (32.83 per match)
- Top scorer(s): Shéa Cassidy (2-40)

The 2025 Derry Senior Hurling Championship was the 80th staging of the Derry Senior Hurling Championship since its establishment by the Derry County Board in 1887. The championship was scheduled to run from 8 August to 8 October 2025.

Slaughtneil were the defending champions.

The senior final was played on 5 October 2025 at Owenbeg, between Slaughtneil and Kevin Lynch's. Slaughtneil won the match by 3–24 to 1–10 to claim their 19th championship title overall and a 13th consecutive title.

== Group A ==
=== Group A table ===
Senior playoffs Junior playoffs

Team	Matches				Score			Pts
Team	Pld	W	D	L	For	Against	Diff	Pts
Slaughtneil	3	3	0	0	86	48	38	6
Kevin Lynch's	3	2	0	1	70	53	17	4
Lavey	3	1	0	2	53	66	-13	2
Na Magha	3	0	0	3	41	83	-42	0

=== Group A results ===
8 August 2025 Round 1	Lavey	0-14 - 2-17	Kevin Lynch's	Lavey Grounds

10 August 2025 Round 1	Na Magha	0-11 - 0-34	Slaughtneil	Amelia Earhart Centre

24 August 2025 Round 2	Slaughtneill	0-27 - 1-20	Kevin Lynch's	Owenbeg

24 August 2025 Round 2	Lavey	3-16 - 1-15	Na Magha	Owenbeg

7 September 2025 Round 3	Kevin Lynch's	1-21 - 0-12	Na Magha	Páirc Chaoimhín Uí Loingisgh

7 September 2025 Round 3	Slaughtneil	0-25 - 0-14	Lavey	Emmet Park

== Group B ==
=== Group B table ===
Senior playoffs Junior playoffs

Team	Matches				Score			Pts
Team	Pld	W	D	L	For	Against	Diff	Pts
Ballinascreen	3	3	0	0	69	44	25	6
Swatragh	3	2	0	1	77	54	23	4
Banagher	3	1	0	2	66	55	11	2
Eoghan Rua	3	0	0	3	41	100	-59	0

=== Group B results ===
9 August 2025 Round 1	Ballinascreen	2-23 - 0-08	Eoghan Rua	Owenbeg

9 August 2025 Round 1	Banagher	0-17 - 1-16	Swatragh	Owenbeg

23 August 2025 Round 2	Eoghan Rua	3-09 - 3-24	Banagher	Eoghan Rua Grounds

23 August 2025 Round 2	Ballinascreen	3-13 - 1-17	Swatragh	Dean McGlinchey Park

7 September 2025 Round 3	Swatragh	3-29 - 3-06	Eoghan Rua	Davitt Park

7 September 2025 Round 3	Banagher	0-16 - 2-12	Ballinascreen	Fr McNally Park

== Knockout stage ==
=== Junior playoffs ===
20 September 2025 Playoff	Banagher	3-13 - 1-18	Na Magha	Owenbeg

21 September 2025 Playoff	Lavey	2-16 - 1-08	Eoghan Rua	Owenbeg

=== Senior playoffs ===
20 September 2025 Playoff	Slaughtneil	1-22 - 1-11	Swatragh	Owenbeg

21 September 2025 Playoff	Ballinascreen	1-13 - 3-20	Kevin Lynch's	Owenbeg

=== Junior final ===
8 October 2025 Final	Lavey	1-16 - 1-07	Banagher	Owenbeg
		Report

=== Intermediate final ===
5 October 2025 Final	Swatragh	2-13 - 1-07	Ballinascreen	Owenbeg

=== Senior final ===
5 October 2025 Final	Slaughtneil	3-24 - 1-10	Kevin Lynch's	Owenbeg
	S Cassidy 1-8 (1f, 2 '65'), B Rogers 2-2, C McKaigue 0-5, S McGuigan 0-3, R O Mianain 0-2, F McEldowney 0-1, S McGuigan 0-1, C O Mianain 0-1, J McGuigan 0-1.	Report	R Mullan 1-7 (6fs), C O'Reilly 0-1, C Og McCloskey 0-1, C Kelly 0-1.
