= 2015 Derry Senior Hurling Championship =

Annual hurling competition season

Derry SHC
- Season: 2015
- Champions: Slaughtneil (9th SFC Title)

The 2015 Derry Senior Hurling Championship was the 70th edition of the Derry GAA's premier hurling tournament for senior clubs in Derry club hurling competitions. The winners receive the Fr Collins Cup.

Slaughtneil Robert Emmet's were the defending champions, having beaten Kevin Lynch's 2–11 to 2–9 in the 2014 final. They won their third championship in a row by beating Swatragh 5–26 to 1–5 in the final on 20 September 2015.

== Quarter-finals ==
8 August 2015; 5:00 pm Quarter-Final	Swatragh	5–15 – 1–6	Coleraine	Owenbeg; Referee: Sean McGuigan (Slaughtneil)
8 August 2015; 5:00 pm Quarter-Final	Michael Kirpatrick 2–1 (0-1f), Sean Francis Quinn 1–3, Tommy McCloy and Michael Conway (0-1f) 1–2 each, Sean McNicholl 0–4 (1 '65), Cathal Quinn 0–2, Niall O'Doherty 0–1		Colm McGoldrick 1–2, Sean Leo McGoldrick 0-2f, Anton Rafferty (0-1f) and Liam McGoldrick (1 '65) 0–1 each	Owenbeg; Referee: Sean McGuigan (Slaughtneil)

8 August 2015; 6:45 pm Quarter-Final	Lavey	0–18 – 3–8	Banagher	Owenbeg; Referee: Paddy McEldowney (Ballinascreen); Man of the Match: Shane Lagan (Lavey)
8 August 2015; 6:45 pm Quarter-Final	Sam Dodds 0–6 (0-5f), Colm Murphy 0–4, Paddy Henry 0–3, Liam Murphy 0–2, Dermot O'Neill, Caolan McGurk, Ben Dodds 0–1 each		Brian Óg McGilligan 2–0, Oisin McCloskey 1–1, Tiarnan McCloskey 0-3f, Shane Farren (0-2f) and Jonathan O'Dwyer 0–2 each	Owenbeg; Referee: Paddy McEldowney (Ballinascreen); Man of the Match: Shane Lagan (Lavey)

9 August 2015; 3:00 pm Quarter-Final	Kevin Lynch's	2–16 – 1–5	Na Magha	Owenbeg; Referee: Gearoid O'Neill (Banagher); Man of the Match: Mark Craig
9 August 2015; 3:00 pm Quarter-Final	Mark Craig 2–4, Adrian Armstrong 0–6 (0-4f), Ciaran Herron 0–3, Liam Hinphey, Paddy Kelly, Mark McCormick 0–1		Thomas Gallagher 1–0, Alan Grant 0–2, Diarmuid Shiels, Deaglan Foley (0-1f), Daryl Connolly 0–1 each	Owenbeg; Referee: Gearoid O'Neill (Banagher); Man of the Match: Mark Craig

9 August 2015; 4:45 pm Quarter-Final	Slaughtneil	4–17 – 2–14	Ballinascreen	Owenbeg; Referee: Eamonn Hassan (Swatragh); Man of the Match: Chrissy McKaigue
9 August 2015; 4:45 pm Quarter-Final	Cormac O'Doherty 0–10 (0-5f), Sé McGuigan 3–1, Brendan Rogers 1–3, Chrissy McKaigue 0–2, Brian Cassidy 0–1		Brendan Herron 0–5 (0-2f), Aaron Kelly 1–1, Paul Cleary 0-3f, Dean Flanagan 1–0, Sean McBride and Benny Heron 0–2 each, Anton Kelly 0–1	Owenbeg; Referee: Eamonn Hassan (Swatragh); Man of the Match: Chrissy McKaigue

== Semi-finals ==
29 August 2015; 5:00 pm Quarter-Final	Slaughtneil	1–16 – 1–15 a.e.t.	Kevin Lynch's	Owenbeg; Referee: Alan Nash (Na Magha); Man of the Match: Ciaran O'Kane
29 August 2015; 5:00 pm Quarter-Final	Brendan Rogers 1–3, Cormac O’Doherty 0–5 (0-4f), Gerald Bradley 0–4, Sé McGuigan 0–3, Chrissy McKaigue 0–1	Report	Ciaran Herron 1–13 (1–0 pen, 0-11f, 1 '65), Liam Hinphey and Paul Sweeney 0–1 each	Owenbeg; Referee: Alan Nash (Na Magha); Man of the Match: Ciaran O'Kane

30 August 2015; 5:00 pm Quarter-Final	Swatragh	0–17 – 2–8	Lavey	Owenbeg; Referee: Eddie Nash (Na Magha); Man of the Match: Michael Kirpatrick
30 August 2015; 5:00 pm Quarter-Final	Michael Kirkpatrick 0–12 (0-8f), Sean Francis Quinn 0–2, Michael Warnock, Tommy McCloy, Ruairi Convery 0–1 each	Report	Sam Dodds 0–6 (0-5f), Paddy Henry 1–1, Ryan Farren 1–0, Eamon McGill 0–1	Owenbeg; Referee: Eddie Nash (Na Magha); Man of the Match: Michael Kirpatrick

== Final ==
20 September 2015; 2:30 pm Quarter-Final	Slaughtneil	5–26 – 1–5	Swatragh	Owenbeg; Referee: Paddy McEldowney (Ballinascreen); Man of the Match: Chrissy McKaigue
20 September 2015; 2:30 pm Quarter-Final	Cormac O'Doherty 0–11 (0-4f), Brendan Rogers 2–2, Sé McGuigan 2–1, Chrissy McKaigue 0–6 (0-1f), Brian Cassidy 1–2, Meehaul McGrath 0–2, Paul McNeill and Mark McGuigan 0–1 each	Report	Michael Kirkpatrick 0-5f and Sean Francis Quinn 1–0	Owenbeg; Referee: Paddy McEldowney (Ballinascreen); Man of the Match: Chrissy McKaigue
