= Derry county hurling team =

Hurling team

Derry
- Sport: Hurling
- Irish: Doire
- County board: Derry GAA
- Home venue(s): Celtic Park

Recent competitive record
- Last championship title: 2026 Christy Ring Cup
- Current NHL Division: 3 (6th, relegated from Division 2 in 2026)
- Last league title: 2024 Division 2
First colours	Second colours

The Derry county hurling team represents Derry GAA, the county board of the Gaelic Athletic Association, in the Gaelic sport of hurling. The team competes in the Christy Ring Cup and the National Hurling League.

Derry's home ground is Celtic Park, Derry. The team's manager is Johnny McGarvey.

The team last won the Ulster Senior Championship in 2001, but has never won the All-Ireland Senior Championship.

== History ==
Derry was a hotbed of early hurling activity, with the city's St Patrick's club winning the Ulster Senior Hurling Championship in 1902–03; county teams mainly drawn from the city won the 1906 championship by a walkover, and the contested 1909 final. However, soon afterwards football become the dominant sport in the county, and hurling activity declined, especially in the city where association football clubs were active.

It was the 1970s before Derry claimed any more major hurling honours. The county won two Ulster Junior Championships in 1974 and 1975, as well as the 1975 All-Ireland Junior Championship. The county also won the Ulster Minor Championship twice during the decade in 1973/4? and 1979, before going on to win the next four at the start of the 1980s (1980, 1981, 1982 and 1983); giving the county five consecutive Ulster Minor titles. Derry also won another Ulster Junior (1984) and All-Ireland Junior Championship (1982), with Rory Stevenson still holding a record of his own, as the youngest person ever to play in a Final in Croke Park, that year (1982), playing for Kevin Lynch's Hurling Club Under 14 All-Ireland Féile na nGael winning team.

The 1990s started with Derry claiming back-to-back Ulster Minor titles in 1990 and 1991. The Under 21 side won two more Ulster Under 21 Championships in 1993 and 1997. Derry won the All-Ireland 'B' Senior Hurling Championship in 1996 and the Ulster Intermediate Championship the following year.

In 2000 Derry won its first Ulster Senior Hurling Championship in 92 years, and successfully defended it the following year. The county also won the Ulster Minor Championship in 2001. The Seniors won the Nicky Rackard Cup in 2006. Derry Under 21s claimed back-to-back Ulster Under 21 titles in 2007 and 2008. See 2008 Derry county hurling team season for information from then. The seniors won the Nicky Rackard Cup again in 2017. In 2023 and 2024, Derry U-20s won back to back All Ireland U-20B and Ulster U-20 Championships. Then in 2026, Derry won a second All Ireland U-20B Championship followed by a Christy Ring title for the first time in their history.

== Panel ==
No.	Player	Position	Club
	Sean Kelly	GK	Kevin Lynch's
	Eoin Mulholland	GK	Lavey
	Leo Passmore	GK	Coleraine
	David Sheerin	GK	Slaughtneil
	Andy McBride	DF	Ballinascreen
	Jamie-Lee McGlade	DF	Ballinascreen
	Aodhán O'Hagan	DF	Ballinascreen
	Cathaoir McGilligan	DF	Banagher
	Conor McGurk	DF	Lavey
	Eamon McGill	DF	Lavey
	Tiernan Melaugh	DF	Lavey
	Eoin Scullion	DF	Lavey
	Sean Cassidy	DF	Slaughtneil
	Conor Coyle	DF	Slaughtneil
	Eamon Cassidy	DF	Slaughtneil
	Meehaul McGrath	DF	Slaughtneil
	Eunan Boylan	DF	Slaughtneil
	Patrick Turner	DF	Swatragh
	Thomas Brady	MF	Kevin Lynch's
	Ryan McGill	MF	Lavey
	Ryan McGarvey	MF	Lavey
	Cormac O'Doherty	MF	Slaughtneil
	Eamon Conway	FW	Ballinascreen
	Darragh McGilligan	FW	Kevin Lynch's
	Rian Collins	FW	Lavey
	Connor Melaugh	FW	Lavey
	Fintan Bradley	FW	Lavey
	Deaghlan Foley	FW	Na Magha
	Michael Lynch	FW	Na Magha
	Joseph Mulholland	FW	O'Donovan Rossa
	Shea Cassidy	FW	Slaughtneil
	Sean Martin Quinn	FW	Swatragh

== Management team ==
Manager: Johnny McGarvey

Selectors: Gavan Duffy, Terence Gray, Paul McDermott, Dara Curley

Goalkeeping Coach: Gareth O'Kane

S&C/Physio: Oisin Quinn, Ann Boylan, Kerry Quinn

== Managerial history ==
Kevin McNaughton 1997–2001

Dominic McKinley (Antrim) 2001–2004

Seán McCloskey 2004–2006

Gabriel O'Kane 2006–2008

Brian McGilligan 2008–2010

James O'Kane 2010–2011

Ger Rogan 2012–2014

Tom McLean 2015–2016

Colm McGurk 2017–2018

John McEvoy (Laois) 2019–2020

Dominic McKinley and Cormac Donnelly (Antrim) 2021–2022

Johnny McGarvey 2023–

== Players ==
=== Awards ===
- Champion 15:

Derry has 22, as of 2025. 18 different players have won, as of 2025. 2005: Gregory Biggs
2007: Michael Conway
2008: Stephen Henry
2009: Sean McCullagh
2010: Kevin Hinphey
2011: Oisin McCloskey
2012: Alan Grant
2013: Paddy Kelly
2014: Aaron Kelly
2015: Conor Quinn,Sean McCullagh, Ruairi Convery
2016: Oisin McCloskey^{2nd}
2018: Cian Waldron, Cormac O'Doherty
2019: Sé McGuigan
2021: Cormac O'Doherty^{2nd}
2022: Mark Craig
2023: Richie Mullan, Cormac O'Doherty^{3rd}
2024: Mark Craig^{2nd}
2025: Ruairí Ó Mianáin, Eamon Conway

== Honours ==
Official honours, with additions noted.

=== National ===
- All-Ireland Senior Hurling Championship
  - (bronze) Semi-finalists (1): 1902
  - Quarter-finalists (2): 2000, 2001
  - Preliminary quarter-finalists (1): 1996
- National Hurling League Division 2B
  - (gold) Winners (2): 2022, 2024
- All-Ireland Senior B Hurling Championship
  - (gold) Winners (1): 1996
- All-Ireland Junior Hurling Championship
  - (gold) Winners (2): 1975, 1982
  - (silver) Runners-up (2): 1974, 1979
- Christy Ring Cup
  - (gold) Winners (1): 2026
  - (silver) Runners-up (5): 2015, 2021, 2023, 2024, 2025
- Nicky Rackard Cup
  - (gold) Winners (2): 2006, 2017

=== Provincial ===
- Ulster Senior Hurling Championship
  - (gold) Winners (4): 1902, 1908, 2000, 2001
  - (silver) Runners-up (8): 1901, 1907, 1931, 1998, 1999, 2003, 2012, 2014
- Ulster Intermediate Hurling Championship
  - (gold) Winners (1): 1997
- Ulster Junior Hurling Championship
  - (gold) Winners (3): 1974, 1975, 1984
- Ulster Senior Shield
  - (gold) Winners (1): 2017
- Ulster Under-21 Hurling Championship
  - (gold) Winners (7): 1986, 1987, 1993, 1997, 2007, 2008, 2017
- Ulster Minor Hurling Championship
  - (gold) Winners (9): 1974, 1979, 1980, 1981, 1982, 1983, 1990, 1991, 2001

== Head-to-head record ==
=== Head-to-head Championship record ===
Every championship result since 2015. Includes results from the Ulster Senior Hurling Championship.

Positive Record Neutral Record Negative Record

As of 1 June 2026.

County Team	Pld	W	D	L	Win %	First Meeting	Last Meeting	Province
Antrim	1	0	0	1	0%		2016	Ulster
Armagh	2	2	0	0	100%	2017	2018	Ulster
Donegal	4	4	0	0	100%	2015	2026	Ulster
Down	7	3	0	4	43%	2015	2020	Ulster
Kerry	3	2	0	1	66%		2026	Munster
Kildare	4	0	0	4	0%	2018	2024	Leinster
London	7	5	0	2	71%	2015	2025	Britain
Longford	1	1	0	0	100%		2017	Leinster
Louth	1	1	0	0	100%		2017	Leinster
Mayo	4	2	0	2	50%	2015	2023	Connacht
Meath	5	0	1	4	0%		2026	Leinster
Monaghan	2	2	0	0	100%	2017	2017	Ulster
Offaly	2	0	0	2	0%	2020	2021	Leinster
Roscommon	3	2	0	1	66%	2016	2026	Connacht
Sligo	5	5	0	0	100%	2020	2024	Connacht
Tyrone	4	3	1	0	75%		2025	Ulster
Wicklow	7	4	0	3	57%	2016	2026	Leinster

Counties Derry has never played in the championship since 2015

Province	No.	Counties
Connacht	2	Galway, Leitrim
Leinster	6	Carlow, Dublin, Kilkenny, Laois, Westmeath, Wexford
Munster	5	Clare, Cork, Limerick, Tipperary, Waterford
Ulster	2	Cavan, Fermanagh
Britain	2	Lancashire, Warwickshire
