= 2014 Derry Senior Hurling Championship =

Annual hurling competition season

The 2014 Derry Senior Hurling Championship was the 68th staging of the Derry Senior Hurling Championship since its establishment by the Derry County Board in 1887. The championship began on 23 July 2014 and ended on 28 September 2014.

Slaughtneil were the defending champions, and successfully retained the title following a 2–11 to 2–9 defeat of Kevin Lynch's Hurling Club.

== Results ==
=== Quarter-finals ===
23 July 2014 Quarter-final	Banagher	1-13 - 1 -18	Slaughtneil	Owenbeg
19:30	Shane Farren 0-7f, Brian Óg McGilligan 1-2, Ciaran Lynch, Gearoid O'Neill, Oisin McCloskey, Johnny O'Dwyer 0-1 each		Chrissy McKaigue 0-9 (0-1f), Gareth O'Kane 0-3f, Sé McGuigan 1-0, Jarlath Mulholland, Gerald Bradley, Cormac O'Doherty, Mark McGuigan, Michael Kearney, Brendan Rogers 0-1 each	Referee: Éamonn Hassan (Swatragh)

24 July 2014 Quarter-final	Kevin Lynch's Hurling Club	2-19 - 0-10	Lavey	Owenbeg
19:30	Ciaran Herron 0-9 (0-5f, 3 '65), Mark Craig 1-2, Ryan O'Kane 1-1, Kevin Hinphey 0-3, Thomas Brady, Niall Ferris, Patrick McCloskey (0-1f) 0-1 each	?	Paddy Henry 0-4f, Sam Dodds and Brendan Laverty 0-2 each, Chrissy Henry and Michael Taggart 0-1 each	Referee: Alan Nash (Na Magha)

24 July 2014 Quarter-final	Na Magha	3-6 - 3-22	Swatragh	Banagher
19:30	Diarmuid Shields 2-0, Daryl Connolly 0-4 (0-3f), Deaglan Foley 1-0, Brendan Quigley (1 '65) and Brendan Douban 0-1 each		Ruairi Convery 1-12 (0-6f), Chrissy Convery 1-3, Michael Conway 1-2, Martin McQuillan 0-3, Eugene McGuckin 0-2	Referee: Edward Óg Nash

27 July 2014 Quarter-final	Ballinascreen	0-15 - 0-13	Coleraine	Swatragh
19:30	Aaron Kelly 0-7 (0-6f), Paul Cleary 0-3 (0-1f), Sean McGuigan 0-2, Hugh Pat Kelly, Sean McBride, Brendan Herron 0-1 each		Ciaran Gaile 0-5 (0-2f), Ruairi Leonard 0-3 (0-2f), Ciaran McGoldrick 0-2, Liam Frizelle, Sean Leo McGoldrick, Colm McGoldrick 0-1 each	Referee: Sean McGuigan (Slaughtneil)

=== Semi-finals ===
6 September 2014 Semi-final	Ballinascreen	1-12 - 1-13	Slaughtneil	Owenbeg
14:00		Report		Referee: O Elliot

6 September 2014 Semi-final	Kevin Lynch's Hurling Club	0-19 - 0-9	Swatragh	Owenbeg
15:30				Referee: A Nash

=== Final ===
28 September 2014 Final	Kevin Lynch's Hurling Club	2-9 - 2-11	Slaughtneil	Owenbeg
16:00
