= 2017 Derry Senior Hurling Championship =

Annual hurling competition season

Derry SHC
- Season: 2017
- Champions: Slaughtneil Robert Emmet's

The 2017 Derry Senior Hurling Championship was the 72nd edition of the Derry GAA's premier hurling tournament for senior clubs in Derry. The winners receive the Fr Collins Cup. Slaughtneil Robert Emmet's won their fifth title in a row.

Slaughtneil Robert Emmet's were the defending champions, having beaten Banagher in the 2016 final 2–19 to 1–12.

== Quarter-finals ==
21 August 2017; 8:00 pm Quarter-Final	Kevin Lynch's	1-17 - 0-10	Lavey	Owenbeg; Referee: Paddy McEldowney (Ballinascreen)
21 August 2017; 8:00 pm Quarter-Final		Report		Owenbeg; Referee: Paddy McEldowney (Ballinascreen)

21 August 2017; 8:00 pm Quarter-Final	Ballinascreen	2-16 - 1-15	Swatragh	Celtic Park; Referee: Adrian McGilligan (Drumsurn)
21 August 2017; 8:00 pm Quarter-Final		Report		Celtic Park; Referee: Adrian McGilligan (Drumsurn)

== Semi-finals ==
2 September 2017; 2:00 pm Semi-Final	Kevin Lynch's	1-11 - 2-11	Banagher	Celtic Park; Referee: Eamon Hasson (Swatragh); Man of the Match: Brian Óg McGilligan
2 September 2017; 2:00 pm Semi-Final	Odhran McKeever 0-5 (0-4f), Niall Ferris 0-4, Corey O'Reilly 1-1, Kevin Hinphey 0-1		Oisin McCloskey 2-0, Darragh Cartin 0-5f, Steafan McCloskey 0-2, Daryll McDermott (0-1f), Brian Óg McGilligan, Sean McCullagh, Tiernan McCloskey (0-1f) 0-1 each	Celtic Park; Referee: Eamon Hasson (Swatragh); Man of the Match: Brian Óg McGilligan

2 September 2017; 3:45 pm Semi-Final	Slaughtneil	1-21 - 1-8	Ballinascreen	Celtic Park; Referee: Adrian McGilligan (Drumsurn); Man of the Match: Brendan Rogers
2 September 2017; 3:45 pm Semi-Final	Brendan Rogers 0-10 (0-5f), Cormac O'Doherty 1-3, Sé McGuigan 0-3, Gerald Bradley 0-2, Conor McAllister, Sean O'Caiside, Brian Cassidy 0-1 each		Brendan Herron 1-2 (0-1f), Sean McBride 0-2 (0-1f), John McCloskey, Reece McSorley, Phillip McGlade, Paul Cleary (0-1f) 0-1 each	Celtic Park; Referee: Adrian McGilligan (Drumsurn); Man of the Match: Brendan Rogers

== Final ==
16 September 2017; Final	Slaughtneil	2-18 - 0-14	Banagher	Celtic Park; Referee: Tarlach Conway (Ballinascreen); Man of the Match: Chrissy McKaigue
16 September 2017; Final	Brendan Rogers 0-7 (0-5f), Sé McGuigan and Brian Cassidy 1-1 each, Cormac O'Doherty 0-3 (0-1f), Sean Cassidy 0-2, Karl McKaigue, Shane McGuigan, Conor McAllister, Mark McGuigan 0-1 each		Darragh Cartin 0-9f, Darragh McCloskey, Mark Lynch, Sean McCullagh, Shane Delaney, Shane Farren (0-1f) 0-1 each	Celtic Park; Referee: Tarlach Conway (Ballinascreen); Man of the Match: Chrissy McKaigue
