= 2016 Derry Senior Hurling Championship =

Annual hurling competition season

Derry SHC
- Season: 2016
- Champions: Slaughtneil (10th SFC Title)

The 2016 Derry Senior Hurling Championship was the 71st edition of the Derry GAA's premier hurling tournament for senior clubs in Derry club hurling competitions. The winners receive the Fr Collins Cup.

Slaughtneil Robert Emmet's were the defending champions, having beaten Swatragh 5–26 to 1–5 in the 2015 final. They won their fourth championship in a row by beating Bangher 2–19 to 1–12 in the final on 11 September 2016.

== Quarter-finals ==
13 August 2016; 5:15 pm Quarter-Final	Banagher	3–15 – 1–9	Ballinascreen	Owenbeg; Referee: Eamon Hasson (Swatragh); Man of the Match: Brian Óg McGilligan
13 August 2016; 5:15 pm Quarter-Final	Shane Farren 1–4 (0-3f), Oisin McCloskey 1–2, Mark Lynch 1–1, Brian Óg McGilligan 0–4, Steafan McCloskey 0–2, Tiarnan McCloskey and Jonathan O'Dwyer 0–1 each		Brendan Herron 0–5 (0-2f, 2 '65), Paul Cleary 1–1, Sean McBride, Hugh Pat Kelly, Damien McGlade 0–1 each	Owenbeg; Referee: Eamon Hasson (Swatragh); Man of the Match: Brian Óg McGilligan

13 August 2016; 7:00 pm Quarter-Final	Slaughtneil	6–30 – 0–11	Lavey	Owenbeg; Referee: Tarlach Conway (Ballinascreen); Man of the Match: Cormac O'Doherty
13 August 2016; 7:00 pm Quarter-Final	Cormac O'Doherty 2–12 (0-6f, 1 '65), Cormac McKenna 2–4 (0-1f), Sé McGuigan 1–2, Brendan Rogers 0–4, Meehaul McGrath 1–0, Conor McAllister, Mark McGuigan, Gareth O'Kane (0-1f) 0–2 each, Karl McKaigue and Chrissy McKaigue (0-1f) 0–1 each	Report	Paddy Henry 0-7f, Brendan Laverty 0–2, Colm Murphy and Ben Dodds 0–1 each	Owenbeg; Referee: Tarlach Conway (Ballinascreen); Man of the Match: Cormac O'Doherty

14 August 2016; 6:00 pm Quarter-Final	Kevin Lynch's	8–24 – 0–8	Na Magha	Owenbeg; Referee: Gearoid O'Neill (Banagher); Man of the Match: Niall Ferris
14 August 2016; 6:00 pm Quarter-Final	Gavan McCormick 2–3, Niall Ferris 1–6, Corey O’Reilly 2–2, Conor McElhinney 1–5, Liam Óg Hinphey 1–1, Ciaran Steele 1–0, Ciaran Herron 0–3 (0-2f, 1 '65), Mark McCormick 0–2, Kevin Hinphey and Ciaran Mackle 0–1 each	Report	Deaglan Foley 0–7 (0-6f, 1 '65) and Daryl Connolly 0–1	Owenbeg; Referee: Gearoid O'Neill (Banagher); Man of the Match: Niall Ferris

== Semi-finals ==
28 August 2016; 2:00 pm Semi-Final	Banagher	1–16 – 0–14	Kevin Lynch's	Owenbeg; Attendance: 1831; Referee: Paddy McEldowney (Ballinascreen); Man of the Match: Mark Lynch
28 August 2016; 2:00 pm Semi-Final	Shane Farren 0-10 (0-7f, 1 '65), Oisin McCloskey 1-0, Ciaran Lynch 0-2, Brian Óg McGilligan, Pauric McCloskey, Steafan McCloskey, Darragh Cartin 0-1 each	Report	Corey O'Reilly 0-3, Niall Ferris, Kevin Hinphey, Gavan McCormack (0-2f) 0-2 each, Ciaran Herron (0-1f), Tomas Brady, Conor McElhinney, Odhran McKeever, Ciaran Steele 0-1 each	Owenbeg; Attendance: 1831; Referee: Paddy McEldowney (Ballinascreen); Man of the Match: Mark Lynch

28 August 2016; 3:45 pm Semi-Final	Slaughtneil	1–29 – 0–10	Swatragh	Owenbeg; Attendance: 1831; Referee: Tarlach Conway (Ballinascreen); Man of the Match: Brendan Rogers
28 August 2016; 3:45 pm Semi-Final	Cormac O’Doherty 0-12f, Brendan Rogers 0-7, Gerald Bradley 1-2, Chrissy McKaigue 0-3, Conor McAllister 0-2, Meehaul McGrath, Mark McGuigan, Cormac McKenna 0-1 each	Report	Ruari Convery 0-6 (0-5f), Michael Kirkpatrick 0-2 (0-1f), Eugene McGuckin and Sean Francis Quinn 0-1 each	Owenbeg; Attendance: 1831; Referee: Tarlach Conway (Ballinascreen); Man of the Match: Brendan Rogers

== Final ==
11 September 2016; 3:45 pm Semi-Final	Slaughtneil	2–19 – 1–12	Banagher	Owenbeg; Attendance: 2,459; Referee: Eamon Hasson (Swatragh); Man of the Match: Brendan Rogers
11 September 2016; 3:45 pm Semi-Final		Report		Owenbeg; Attendance: 2,459; Referee: Eamon Hasson (Swatragh); Man of the Match: Brendan Rogers
