= Cormac O'Doherty =

Derry and Slaughtneil hurler

Personal information
- Native name: Cormac Ó Dochartaigh (Irish)
- Born: 1996 (age 29–30) Maghera, Northern Ireland

Sport
- Sport: Hurling
- Position: Midfield
Club
- Years: Club
- 2013–present: Slaughtneil
Club titles
	Football	Hurling
Derry titles	5	10
Ulster titles	3	3
All-Ireland titles	0	0
Inter-county
- Years: County
- 2017–present: Derry
Inter-county titles
- Ulster titles: 0
- All-Irelands: 0
- NHL: 1
- All Stars: 0

Cormac O'Doherty (born 1996) is a dual player of Gaelic games, i.e. hurling and Gaelic football, who plays for Derry Championship club Slaughtneil and at inter-county level for the Derry senior hurling team. He usually lines out at midfield and been captain of the team since the 2021 season.

== Career ==
O'Doherty first came to Gaelic games prominence as a student at St Patrick's College in Maghera, winning consecutive MacRory Cup titles and a Hogan Cup title in 2013. He joined the Slaughtneil senior hurling and football teams. Since his debut as a dual player, he won 8 Ulster Club Championship titles and 17 County Championship titles across both codes. O'Doherty first appeared on the inter-county scene during a three-year tenure with the Derry minor team, before later winning an Ulster Championship title with the under-21 team. He was drafted onto the Derry senior hurling team in 2017 and won a Nicky Rackard Cup in his debut season.

== Career statistics ==
As of match played June 2025.

Team	Year	National League			Rackard Cup		Ring Cup		Total	
Team	Year	Division	Apps	Score	Apps	Score	Apps	Score	Apps	Score
Derry	2017	Division 2B	0	0-00	1	0-01	—		1	0-01
Derry	2018	Division 2B	2	0-05	—		3	1-34	5	1-39
Derry	2019	Division 2B	4	0-30	—		4	2-24	8	2-54
Derry	2020	Division 2B	6	1-64	—		2	0-14	8	1-78
Derry	2021	Division 2B	4	0-35	—		4	0-32	8	0-67
Derry	2022	Division 2B	5	0-40	—		5	0-23	10	0-63
Derry	2023	Division 2A	5	1-42	—		5	2-34	10	3-76
Derry	2024	Division 2B	6	0-33	—		6	1-50	12	1-83
Derry	2025	Division 2	2	0-00	—		6	3-45	8	3-45
Total			34	2-216	1	0-01	35	5-161	70	11-506

== Honours ==
St Patrick's College

- O'Keefe Cup: 2011
- Hogan Cup: 2014
- MacRory Cup: 2013, 2014

Slaughtneil

- Ulster Senior Club Hurling Championship: 2016, 2017, 2019, 2021, 2024
- Ulster Senior Club Football Championship: 2014, 2016, 2017
- Derry Senior Football Championship: 2014, 2015, 2016, 2017, 2020
- Derry Senior Hurling Championship: 2013, 2014, 2015, 2016, 2017, 2018, 2019, 2020, 2021, 2022, 2023, 2024

Derry

- Nicky Rackard Cup: 2017
- National Hurling League Division 2B: 2022, 2024
- Ulster Under-21 Hurling Championship: 2017

Individual

Hurling

- Ulster Colleges All-Star: 2014
- GAA Champion 15: 2018, 2021, 2023
- Ulster GAA Presidents Awards - Player Of The Year: 2021
- Gaelic Life (Ulster Club) All-Star: 2016, 2017, 2019, 2020, 2021
- AIB GAA Club Player Awards Team Of The Year: 2022

Sporting positions
Preceded by Seán Cassidy	Derry Senior Hurling Captain; 2021	Incumbent
