= 2023 Derry Senior Hurling Championship =

Annual hurling competition season

- Dates: 27 July - 17 September 2023
- Teams: 8
- Sponsor: Leadon Timber Frame
- Champions: Slaughtneil (17th title); Brendan Rogers (captain); Michael McShane (manager)
- Runners-up: Kevin Lynch's; Kevin Hinphey (manager)

Tournament statistics
- Matches played: 13
- Goals scored: 40 (3.08 per match)
- Points scored: 411 (31.62 per match)

The 2023 Derry Senior Hurling Championship was the 78th staging of the Derry Senior Hurling Championship since its establishment by the Derry County Board in 1887. The draw for the group stage placings took place on 6 July 2023. The championship ran from 27 July to 17 September 2023.

Slaughtneil entered the championship as the defending champions in search of an 11th consecutive title.

The final was played on 17 September 2023 at Owenbeg, between Slaughtneil and Kevin Lynch's in what was their ninth meeting in the final overall and a fifth successive meeting. Slaughtneil won the match by 3-23 to 1-09 to claim their 17th championship title overall and an 11th consecutive title.

== Group A ==
=== Group A table ===
Senior final Intermediate final Junior final

Team	Matches				Score			Pts
Team	Pld	W	D	L	For	Against	Diff	Pts
Slaughtneil	3	3	0	0	101	37	64	6
Ballinascreen	3	2	0	1	59	60	-1	4
Swatragh	3	1	0	2	51	66	-15	2
Na Magha	3	0	0	3	40	88	-48	0

=== Group A results ===
28 July 2023 Round 1	Na Magha	1-09 - 3-31	Slaughtneil	Amelia Earhart Centre

28 July 2023 Round 1	Swatragh	3-08 - 2-14	Ballinascreen	Davitt Park

19 August 2023 Round 2	Slaughtneil	3-20 - 0-10	Ballinascreen	Owenbeg

19 August 2023 Round 2	Swatragh	2-13 - 0-14	Na Magha	Owenbeg

10 September 2023 Round 3	Ballinascreen	2-23 - 2-08	Na Magha	Dean McGlinchey Park

10 September 2023 Round 3	Slaughtneil	2-26 - 1-12	Swatragh	Emmet Park

== Group B ==
=== Group B table ===
Senior final Intermediate final Junior final

Team	Matches				Score			Pts
Team	Pld	W	D	L	For	Against	Diff	Pts
Kevin Lynch's	3	2	0	1	62	52	10	4
Eoghan Rua	3	2	0	1	48	55	-7	4
Banagher	3	1	0	2	59	61	-2	2
Lavey	3	1	0	2	67	68	-1	2

=== Group B results ===
27 July 2023 Round 1	Banagher	0-23 - 1-18	Lavey	Fr McNally Park

28 July 2023 Round 1	Kevin Lynch's	0-18 - 0-07	Eoghan Rua	Kevin Lynch Park

21 August 2023 Round 2	Lavey	2-20 - 2-17	Kevin Lynch's	Lavey Grounds

21 August 2023 Round 2	Eoghan Rua	1-16 - 1-14	Banagher	Eoghan Rua Grounds

9 September 2023 Round 3	Eoghan Rua	3-13 - 0-20	Lavey	Owenbeg

9 September 2023 Round 3	Banagher	4-07 - 1-18	Kevin Lynch's	Owenbeg

== Knockout stage ==
=== Junior final ===
17 September 2023 Final	Banagher	3-17 - 0-22	Swatragh	Owenbeg
	C Murray (2-4), K McAllister (1-0), S Walsh (0-5, 3f), F McGurk (0-2), T Walsh (0-2), SM Quinn (0-3), J Friel (0-1, 1f),	Report	C O'Kane (0-4), C Armstrong (0-6, 6f), C Lynch (0-3), R McCloskey (0-1), S Murphy (0-7, 6f), O McCloskey (0-1, 1pen).	Referee: T Conway

=== Intermediate final ===
17 September 2023 Final	Ballinascreen	3-16 - 0-05	Eoghan Rua	Owenbeg
	C Gough (1-4, 4f), C Doyle (1-2), R O'Kane (1-0), E Conway (0-3, 1f), M Bradley (0-1), A Kelly (0-1), N Doyle (0-2), N Rafferty (0-2), JL McGlade (0-1).	Report	L Passmore (0-3, 2f), L McMullan (0-2)	Referee: O Elliott

=== Senior final ===
17 September 2023 Final	Slaughtneil	3-23 - 1-09	Kevin Lynch's	Owenbeg
	B Rogers (3-2), C O’Doherty 0-8 (0-6f, 0-1 65), R Ó Mianáin (0-3), P McCullagh, M McGuigan, G Bradley, E Cassidy (0-2 each), J Cassidy, S O’Doherty (0-1 each).	Report	Richie Mullan (0-5, 0-2f, 0-2 65), C O’Reilly (0-4), Ronan Mullan (1-0).	Referee: E Hassan (Swatragh)
