= 2015–16 All-Ireland Senior Club Hurling Championship =

All-Ireland Senior Club Hurling Championship 2015–16
Championship Details
- Dates: 4 October 2015 – 17 March 2016
- Teams: 18

All Ireland Champions
- Winners: Na Piarsaigh (1st win)
- Captain: Cathal King
- Manager: Shane O'Neill

All Ireland Runners-up
- Runners-up: Ruairí Óg
- Captain: Arron Graffin
- Manager: John McKillop

Provincial Champions
- Munster: Na Piarsaigh
- Leinster: Oulart–The Ballagh
- Ulster: Ruairí Óg
- Connacht: Not Played

Championship Statistics
- Matches Played: 17
- Total Goals: 43 (2.5 per game)
- Total Points: 495 (29.1 per game)
- Top Scorer: Neil McManus (2–29)

The 2015–16 All-Ireland Senior Club Hurling Championship was the 46th staging of the All-Ireland Senior Club Hurling Championship since it began in the 1970–71 season. It is the Gaelic Athletic Association's premier inter-county club hurling tournament. The winners receive the Tommy Moore Cup.

The championship began on 4 October 2015 and ended on 17 March 2016.

Ballyhale Shamrocks were the defending champions but were defeated by O'Loughlin Gaels in the Kilkenny championship. Cuala, Glen Rovers and Sarsfields returned to the championship after prolonged absences.

On 17 March 2016, Na Piarsaigh won the championship following a 2–25 to 2–14 defeat of Ruairí Óg, Cushendall in the All-Ireland final. This was their first All-Ireland title and a first title for a Limerick club.

Ruairí Óg, Cushendall's Neil McManus was the championship's top scorer with 2–29.

== Format ==
County Championships

Ireland's counties play their county championships between their senior hurling clubs. Each county decides the format for determining their county champions. The format can be knockout, double-elimination, league, etc or a combination.

Provincial Championships

Leinster, Munster and Ulster organise a provincial championship for their participating county champions. Connacht do not organise a provincial championship and are represented in the All-Ireland semi-finals by the Galway champions. All matches are knock-out and extra time is played if it's a draw at the end of normal time.

All-Ireland

The two semi-finals are played in early February. The All-Ireland final is traditionally played in Croke Park on St. Patrick's Day, the 17th of March. All matches are knock-out. If it's a draw at the end of normal time in the semi-finals, extra time is played. If the final ends in a draw the match is replayed.

Initial Schedule

County championships April 2015 to November 2015
Provincial championships October 2015 to December 2015
All-Ireland semi-finals early February 2016
All-Ireland final 17 March 2016

== Provincial championships ==
=== Leinster Senior Club Hurling Championship ===
Quarter-finals
8 November 2015 - O'Connor Park
Coolderry	0-12
Cuala	1-23
1 November 2015 - Netwatch Cullen Park
St. Mullin's	0-9
Clonkill	4–9
1 November 2015 – O'Moore Park
Clough/Ballacolla	0–13
Oulart–The Ballagh	3–8

Semi-finals
15 November 2015 - Parnell Park
Clara	0-17
Cuala	3-12
15 November 2015 - Cusack Park
Clonkill	0-8
Oulart–The Ballagh	0–16

Final
29 November 2015 - Netwatch Cullen Park
Cuala	0-13
Oulart–The Ballagh	2-13

Quarter-finals

1 November 2015 Quarter-final	St. Mullin's	0–9 – 4–9	Clonkill	Netwatch Cullen Park
	M Kavanagh (0-06, 0–05 frees), J Doyle (0-03, 0–01 free).	Report	B Murtagh (2-02, 1–00 pen, 1-02 frees), N Dowdall (2-01), A Dowdall (0-02), A Price (0-02, 0–01 free), C Thompson (0-01), P Dowdall (0-01).	Referee: G McGrath (Dublin)

1 November 2015 Quarter-final	Clough/Ballacolla	0–13 – 3–8	Oulart–The Ballagh	O'Moore Park
	S Maher (0–5), W Hyland (0–4), R Broderick (0–1), T Delaney (0–1), A Corby (0–1), R Phelan (0–1).	Report	R Jacob (1–4), M Doyle (1–0), D Redmond (1–0), D Mythen (0–2), P Roche (0–1), B Dunne (0–1).	Referee: P Burke (Kilkenny)

8 November 2015 Quarter-final	Coolderry	0–12 – 1–23	Cuala	O'Connor Park
	D Murray (0–7, 0–06 frees, 0–1 ’65), D King (0–2), K Connolly (0–1), A Corcoran (0–1), E Ryan (0–1).	Report	D Treacy (0–12, frees), M Schutte (1–2), D O’Connell (0–2), J Malone (0–1), C Cronin (0–1), C Waldron (0–1), S Treacy (0–1), N Kenny (0–1), S Moran 0–1, N Carty (0–1).	Referee: D Hughes (Carlow)

Semi-finals

15 November 2015 Semi-final	Cuala	3–12 – 0–17	Clara	Parnell Park
	D Treacy (0-06, 0-05f), C Cronin (1-02), M Schutte (1-00), S Treacy (1-00), J Malone (0-02), C Waldron (0-01), D O'Connell (0-01).	Report	K Hogan (0–12, 0-12f), C Bolger (0-02), Lester Ryan (0-01), J Langton (0-01), Liam Ryan (0-01).	Referee: G McGrath (Wexford)

15 November 2015 Semi-final	Clonkill	0–8 – 0–16	Oulart–The Ballagh	Cusack Park
	Anthony Price (0–3, two frees), N Dowdall (0–2), M Heffernan (0–2), B Murtagh (0–1, free).	Report	N Kirwan (0–4, one free, one ‘65’), D Mythen (0–5), R Jacob (0–2), D Redmond (0–2), T Storey (0–1), P Roche (0–1, free), G Sinnott (0–1).	Referee: P Murphy (Carlow)

Final

29 November 2015 Final	Cuala	0–13 – 2–13	Oulart–The Ballagh	Netwatch Cullen Park
	D Treacy (0–10, 0-07f), C O'Callaghan (0-02), S Treacy (0-01).	Report	N Kirwan (0-05, 0-03f, 0-01 65), T Dunne (1-01), G Sinnott (1-00), T Storey (0-03), D Mythen (0-02), E Moore (0-01), D Redmond (0-01).	Referee: D Hughes (Carlow)

=== Munster Senior Club Hurling Championship ===
Quarter-finals
25 October 2015 - O'Garney Park
Sixmilebridge	1-15
Na Piarsaigh	3-11

Semi-finals
8 November 2015 - Walsh Park
Ballygunner	0-19
Glen Rovers	1-9
15 November 2015 - Gaelic Grounds
Na Piarsaigh	2-15
Thurles Sarsfields	0–17

Final
22 November 2015 - Semple Stadium
Ballygunner	2-11
Na Piarsaigh	2-18

Quarter-final

25 October 2015 Quarter-final	Sixmilebridge	1–15 – 3–11	Na Piarsaigh	O'Garney Park
	N Gilligan (0–7, five frees), C Malone (1–1), B Corry (0–3), A Morey (0–2), C Deasy and S Golden (0–2 each).	Report	S Dowling (0–5, three frees, one 65m), A Breen (1–2), K Downes (1–1), P Casey (1–0), R Lynch (free), D Dempsey and K Ryan (0–1 each).	Referee: C McAllister (Cork)

Semi-finals

8 November 2015 Semi-final	Ballygunner	0–19 – 1–9	Glen Rovers	Walsh Park
	Brian O’Sullivan (0–9; 0–7, 0–1 65), Shane O’Sullivan (0–2), P Hogan (0–2), S Power (0–2; 0–1 65), T O’Sullivan (0–1), B O’Keeffe (0–1), H Barnes (0–1), C Sheahan (0–1).	Report	P Horgan (1–5; 0-3f, 0–1 65), G Moylan (0–1), G Callanan (0–1), C Dorris (0–1), B Phelan (0–1).	Referee: J Murphy (Limerick)

15 November 2015 Semi-final	Na Piarsaigh	2–15 – 0–17	Thurles Sarsfields	Gaelic Grounds
	S Dowling 0–7 (7f), D Dempsey 1–1, P Casey 1–1, K Ryan 0–2, A Dempsey 0–2, K Downes 0–1, C King 0–1.	Report	P Bourke 0–8 (5f 1 ‘65’), A McCormack 0–3, S Cahill 0–2, B McCarthy 0–1, L Corbett 0–1, C Lanigan 0–1, J Maher 0–1.	Referee: D Kirwan (Cork)

Final

22 November 2015 Final	Ballygunner	2–11 – 2–18	Na Piarsaigh	Semple Stadium
	B O’Sullivan 1–6 (4f, 2 65s), T O’Sullivan 1–0, S Power 0–2 (1f), S O’Keeffe 0–1 (1f), S O’Sullivan 0–1, JJ Hutchinson 0–1	Report	S Dowling 1–4 (2f), D Dempsey 1–2, P Casey 0–3, R Lynch (1f), A Dempsey 0–2, K Ryan 0–2, M Foley 0–1, W O’Donoghue 0–1, D Breen 0–1.	Referee: D Kirwan (Cork)

=== Ulster Senior Club Hurling Championship ===
Quarter-finals
4 October 2015 - Drumgoon Road
Lisbellaw	2-10
Middletown	0-19

Semi-finals
11 October 2015 - O'Neill Park
Ballycran	0-14
Slaughtneil	2-18
11 October 2015 - Owenbeg
Ruairí Óg, Cushendall	1-17
Middletown	1–9

Final
25 October 2015 - Athletic Grounds
Slaughtneil	3-17 aet
Ruairí Óg, Cushendall	1-24 aet

Quarter-final

4 October 2015 Quarter-final	Lisbellaw	2–10 – 0–19	Middletown	Drumgoon Road
	S Corrigan 1–6, C McShea 1–0, J Duffy 0–3, C Corrigan 0–1.	Report	R Gaffney 0–11, C Carville 0–3, S Toal 0–1, D Carville 0–1, P Hughes 0–1, P Lappin 0–1, M Maguire 0–1.	Referee: J O'Connor

Semi-finals

11 October 2015 Semi-final	Ballycran	0–14 – 2–18	Slaughtneil	O'Neill Park
	James Coyle 0-8f, Scott Nicholson 0–2, Brendan Ennis 0–2, Christopher Egan 0–1, Eugene Gilmore 0–1.	Report	Cormac O'Doherty 1–7 (0-7f), Brendan Rogers 1–3, Brian Cassidy 0–3, Chrissy McKaigue and Sé McGuigan 0–2 each, Gareth O'Kane 0–1	Referee: O Elliott

11 October 2015 Semi-final	Ruairí Óg, Cushendall	1–17 – 1–9	Middletown	Owenbeg
	Donal McNaughton 1–3, Shane McNaughton 0–4, Christy McNaughton 0–3, Paddy McGill, Neil McManus, Karl McKeegan 0–2 each, Ryan McCambridge 0–1.	Report	Ryan Gaffney 0–6, Mark Maguire 1–0, Cathal Carville 0–2, P McBride 0–1.	Referee: É Hassan

Final

25 October 2015 Final	Slaughtneil	3–17 – 1–24 (aet)	Ruairí Óg, Cushendall	Athletic Grounds
3:30 pm	C O'Doherty 0–9 (9f), B Rodgers 1–2 (1f), B Cassidy 1–1, G O'Kane 1–1, C McKaigue 0–2, M Kearney, O O'Doherty (f) 0–1 each.	Report	N McManus 0–13 (9f); C McNaughton 1–2; K McKeegan, S McNaughton, D McNaughton 0–2 each; E Campbell, S McAfee, C Carson 0–1 each.	Referee: J Clarke (Cavan)

== All-Ireland Senior Club Hurling Championship ==
=== All-Ireland Draw ===
Semi-finals
6 February 2016
Oulart the Ballagh, Wexford	0-20 AET
Na Piarsaigh, Limerick	1-22 AET
6 February 2016
Sarsfields, Galway	1-6
Ruairí Óg, Cushendall	3–12

Final
17 March 2016
Na Piarsaigh, Limerick	2-25
Ruairí Óg, Cushendall	2-14

=== All-Ireland Semi-Finals ===
6 February 2016 Semi-final	Sarsfields	1–6 – 3–12	Ruairí Óg, Cushendall	Páirc Tailteann
14:00	Niall Morrissey (0-5f), Joseph Cooney 1–0, Alan Ward 0–1	Report	Neil McManus 1–7 (1–0 pen, 0-5f), Sean McAfee 1–0, Karl McKeegan 1–0, Paddy McGill 0–3, Conor Carson and Alec Delargy 0–1 each	Referee: P O'Dwyer (Carlow)

6 February 2016 Semi-final	Oulart the Ballagh	0–20 – 1–22 (AET)	Na Piarsaigh	Semple Stadium
15:45	Nicky Kirwan 0–10 (0-8f), Des Mythen 0–3, Eoin Moore 0–2 (0-1f), Shaun Murphy, Garrett Sinnott, Tommy Storey, Conor O’Leary (1f), Billy Dunne (0-1f) 0–1 each.	Report	David Breen 1–2, Shane Dowling 0–5 (0–4 frees); Kevin Downes and Alan Dempsey 0–4 each, David Dempsey, Peter Casey 0–2 each, Ronan Lynch (0-1f), Adrian Breen, Will O'Donoghue 0–1 each.	Referee: F Horgan (Tipperary)

=== All-Ireland final ===
17 March 2016 Final	Na Piarsaigh	2–25 – 2–14	Ruairí Óg, Cushendall	Croke Park
14:00	Shane Dowling (0–7, 0–5 frees), Adrian Breen (1–4); Kevin Downes (1–2); Alan Dempsey (0–4); Peter Casey (0–3); David Breen (0–2); Ronan Lynch, Will O’Donoghue, Pat Gleeson (1 '65) (0–1 each).	Report	Neil McManus (1–7, 0–7 frees); Shane McNaughton (0–4); Karl McKeegan (1–0); Eoghan Campbell, Alec Delargy, Conor Carson (0–1 each).	Referee: D Kirwan (Cork)

== Top scorers ==
Overall

Rank	Player	Club	Tally	Total	Matches	Average
1	Neil McManus	Ruairí Óg	2–29	35	4	8.75
2	Shane Dowling	Na Piarsaigh	1–28	31	5	6.20
3	David Treacy	Cuala	0–28	28	3	9.33
4	Cormac O'Doherty	Slaughtneil	1–16	19	2	9.50
4	Nicky Kirwan	Oulart–The Ballagh	0–19	19	3	6.33
6	Brian O'Sullivan	Ballygunner	1–15	18	2	9.00
7	Ryan Gaffney	Middletown	0–17	17	2	8.50
8	Peter Casey	Na Piarsaigh	2–9	15	5	3.00
9	Kevin Downes	Na Piarsaigh	2–8	14	4	3.50
10	Adrian Breen	Na Piarsaigh	2–7	13	5	2.60

Single game

Rank	Player	Club	Tally	Total	Opposition
1	Neil McManus	Ruairí Óg	0–13	13	Slaughtneil
2	David Treacy	Cuala	0–12	12	Coolderry
3	Keith Hogan	Clara	0–12	12	Cuala
4	Ryan Gaffney	Middletown	0–11	11	Lisbellaw
5	Neil McManus	Ruairí Óg	1–7	10	Na Piarsaigh
5	Cormac O'Doherty	Slaughtneil	1–7	10	Ballycran
5	Neil McManus	Ruairí Óg	1–7	10	Sarsfields
5	David Treacy	Cuala	0–10	10	Oulart–The Ballagh
5	Nicky Kirwan	Oulart–The Ballagh	0–10	10	Na Piarsaigh
10	Seán Corrigan	Lisbellaw	1–6	9	Middletown
10	Brian O'Sullivan	Ballygunner	1–6	9	Na Piarsaigh
10	Cormac O'Doherty	Slaughtneil	0–9	9	Ruairí Óg
10	Brian O'Sullivan	Ballygunner	0–9	9	Glen Rovers

== Miscellaneous ==
After losing six provincial finals between 1994 and 2013, Oulart–The Ballagh finally won the Leinster title by defeating Cuala 2–13 to 0–13.

== Team Summaries ==
Team	County	Captain(s)	Manager	Most recent success		
Team	County	Captain(s)	Manager	All-Ireland	Provincial	County
Ballycran	Down				1993	2011
Ballygunner	Waterford	David O'Sullivan	Denis Walsh		2001	2014
Clara	Kilkenny	Keith Hogan	Mick Purcell			2013
Clonkill	Westmeath	Paddy Dowdall	David O'Reilly			2012
Clough/Ballacolla	Laois	Darren Maher	Kevin Martin			2011
Coolderry	Offaly	Brian Carroll	Johnny Kelly		2011	2011
Cuala	Dublin		Mattie Kenny			1994
Glen Rovers	Cork	Graham Callinan	Richie Kelleher	1977	1976	1989
Lisbellaw	Fermanagh		Adie Phillips			2013
Middletown	Armagh		Arthur Hughes			2012
Na Piarsaigh	Limerick	Cathal King	Shane O'Neill		2013	2013
Oulart–The Ballagh	Wexford	Barry Kehoe	Frank Flannery			2013
Ruairí Óg, Cushendall	Antrim	Seán Delargy; Arron Graffin	John McKillop		2015	2015
Sarsfields	Galway	Joe Cooney	Cathal Murray	1994	1997	1997
Sixmilebridge	Clare	Caimin Morey	John O'Meara	1996	2000	2013
Slaughtneil	Derry		Michael McShane			2014
St Mullin's	Carlow	Paudie Kehoe				2014
Thurles Sarsfields	Tipperary	Pádraic Maher	Paddy McCormack		2012	2014
