= 2026–27 All-Ireland Junior Club Hurling Championship =

All-Ireland inter-county competition for junior clubs

Championship Details
- Dates: 18 October 2026 – January 2027
- Teams: 30

All Ireland Champions

Provincial Champions
- Munster: Not Played
- Leinster: Not Played
- Ulster: Swatragh
- Connacht: Sylane

Championship Statistics
- Matches Played: 23
- Total Goals: 71
- Total Points: 736
- Top Scorer: James Friel (1–25)

The 2026–27 All-Ireland Junior Club Hurling Championship is scheduled to be the 23rd staging of the All-Ireland Junior Club Hurling Championship, the Gaelic Athletic Association's junior inter-county club hurling tournament.

The All-Ireland final will be played at Croke Park in January 2027.

== Team summaries ==
Team	Championship	Most recent success		
Team	Championship	All Ireland	Provincial	County
Patrick Sarsfields	Antrim JHC	—	—	—
Killeavy	Armagh IHC	—	—	2023
Cootehill Celtic	Cavan SHC	—	—	2025
Ennistymon	Clare JAHC	—	—	2004
Kilshannig	Cork PJHC	—	—	—
Swatragh	Derry JHC	—	—	2023
Seán MacCumhaills	Donegal JHC	—	—	2016
Castlewellan	Down JHC	—	—	2025
Clanna Gael Fontenoy	Dublin JAHC	—	—	1999
Erne Gaels	Fermanagh JHC	—	—	2025
Sylane	Galway PJHC	—	—	—
Dr Crokes	Kerry IHC	—	—	2020
Leixlip	Kildare IHC	—	—	—
Conahy Shamrocks	Kilkenny PJHC	2020	2019	2019
Fullen Gaels	Lancashire SHC	—	2021	2024
Slieve Bloom	Laois IHC	—	—	2018
Carrick Hurling	Leitrim SHC			2024
Caherline	Limerick PJAHC	—	—	2021
Fr Murphy's	London IHC	—	—	2024
St Fechin's	Louth SHC	—	—	2024
Moytura	Mayo JHC	—	—	—
Dunderry	Meath SBHC	—	—	—
Truagh Gaels	Monaghan SHC	—	—	—
Shamrocks GAA	Offaly IHC	—	—	2022
Naomh Eoin	Sligo SHC	—	—	2019
Fethard	Tipperary JAHC	—	—	—
Omagh St Enda's	Tyrone JHC	—	—	—
John Mitchel's	Warwickshire SHC	—	2019	2022
St Declan's Ardmore	Waterford JAHC	—	2017	—
Turin	Westmeath IHC	—	—	—
Gusserane O'Rahilly's	Wexford IAHC	—	—	2020

== All-Britain Club Hurling Championship ==
=== All Britain semi-final ===
18 October 2026 Semi-final	Fr Murphy's (London)	5-13 - 3-14	Fullen Gaels (Lancashire)	Páirc na hÉireann

=== All Britain final ===
15 November 2026 Final	Fr Murphy's (London)	3-16 - 0-10	John Mitchel's (Warwickshire)	McGovern Park

== Connacht Junior Club Hurling Championship ==
The details about the Connacht Junior Club Hurling Championship draw.

=== Connacht semi-finals ===
14 November 2026 Semi-final	Naomh Eoin (Sligo)	2-15 - 0-17	Carrick Hurling (Leitrim)	Markievicz Park
	G O’Kelly Lynch 0-8 (3f), F O’Kelly Lynch 1-0, T O’Brien 1-0, P O’Leary 0-2, L O’Kelly Lynch 0-2 each, P O’Brien, T O’Kelly Lynch, J Carroll 0-1 each.	Report	M Dervin 0-7 (6f), S O’Riordan 0-4 (3f), J McNabola, N Crowe 0-2 each, P Lenahan, P Keane 0-1 each.

14 November 2026 Semi-final	Sylane (Galway)	5-23 - 1-06	Moytura (Mayo)	St Jarlath's Park
	J Igoe (1-8, 0-1 free), S Glynn (2-1), S Newell (0-7, 0-4 frees); P Ronan (1-1), R Keane (1-1), T Keane (0-3), O Martin (0-1), C Burke (0-1).	Report	C Doyle (1-0), B Sheridan (0-3, 0-1 penalty, 0-1 free), E Heraty (0-1, 0-1 65); R Kelly (0-1), T Holleran (0-1).

=== Connacht Final ===
21 November 2026 Final	Naomh Eoin (Sligo)	1-15 - 2-25	Sylane (Galway)	Connacht GAA Centre Of Excellence
		Report

== Leinster Junior Club Hurling Championship ==
The details about the Leinster Junior Club Hurling Championship draw.

=== Leinster first round ===
24 October 2026 First round	Clanna Gael Fontenoy (Dublin)	1-14 - 1-13	St Fechin's (Louth)	O'Toole Park
	K Morgan 0-6 (5f); A Duffy 1-0; S Curzon, S McCann 0-2 each; A Dodd, A Keane, L Ó Laoide, M Morgan 0-1 each.	Report	P Lynch 0-5 (3f, 1 ‘65’); D O’Neill 1-0 (f); R Walsh, R Hackett 0-2 each; P Fortune, J McDonnell, D O’Gorman, D Morgan 0-1 each.

=== Leinster quarter-finals ===
7 November 2026 Quarter-final	Dunderry (Meath)	1-24 - 3-12	Clanna Gael Fontenoy (Dublin)	Meath GAA Games Development Centre
	E Nolan (1-10 seven frees), M Leavy (0-4), C O’Brien (0-4); C Barron (0-2), L Martyn (0-2), J Leavy (0-1), A Kelly (0-1).	Report	E Carroll (2-2), M Morgan (1-4 one free), S Curzon (0-4 three frees), L Ó Laoide (0-1); S McCann (0-1).

7 November 2026 Quarter-final	Gusserane O'Rahilly's (Wexford)	1-16 - 0-08	Slieve Bloom (Laois)	Chadwicks Wexford Park
	M O'Neil 0-9 ( five frees, one 65), S Ryan 0-5, D Rossiter 1-0, G Sheehan and M Rossiter 0-1 each.	Report	C Conroy 0-5 (three frees, one 65), B Conroy, J Holmes and K Burke 0-1 each.

7 November 2026 Quarter-final	Turin (Westmeath)	0-21 - 0-20	Leixlip (Kildare)	Killucan Grounds
	C Heffernan 0-13 (7 frees, 65), E McGrath 0-2, D Smith 0-2, S Leech 0-2, PJ O’Neill 0-1, C Leech 0-1.	Report	C Bracken 0-9 (7 frees), D Melville 0-4, S O’Connor 0-3, C Melville 0-1, C Harrington 0-1, J Evans 0-1; D Doherty 0-1.

8 November 2026 Quarter-final	Shamrocks (Offaly)	1-19 - 1-21	Conahy Shamrocks (Kilkenny)	Glenisk O'Connor Park
	E Neville (0-14, 0-12 frees), D Dooley (1-2), C Egan (0-2), D O'Toole-Greene (0-1).	Report	E Delaney (0-13, 0-9 frees, 0-1 sideline cut), J Bergin, T Phelan (0-3 each), M Gunner (1-0), T Rice, P Kennedy (0-1 each).

=== Leinster semi-finals ===
22 November 2026 Semi-final	Dunderry (Meath)	3-11 - 2-24	Gusserane O'Rahilly's (Wexford)	St Loman's Park
	E Nolan (1-6 five frees, one '65'), L Martyn (1-1), M Leavy (1-0), A Kelly (0-3), C Barron (0-1).	Report	S Ryan (2-4); M O'Neill (0-9 five frees), D Rossiter (0-5), S Wall (0-4), J Rossiter (0-1); J Roche (0-1).	Referee: R Hanley

22 November 2026 Semi-final	Conahy Shamrocks (Kilkenny)	1-21 - 0-14	Turin (Westmeath)	Páirc Lachtáin
				Referee: D Alford

=== Leinster final ===
6 December 2026 Final	Gusserane O'Rahilly's (Wexford)	v	Conahy Shamrocks (Kilkenny)	TBC

== Munster Junior Club Hurling Championship ==
The details about the Munster Junior Club Hurling Championship draw.

=== Munster quarter-finals ===
31 October 2026 Quarter-final	Ennistymon (Clare)	2-09 - 1-13	Fethard (Tipperary)	Ennistymon Grounds
	M O'Keeffe (2-5, 1-4f, 1-0 pen), P O'Dwyer 0-2, L Cotter, J Vaughan 0-1 each.	Report	D Barry (0-7, 0-6f), R Walsh (1-2, 0-1 sl-cut), C Walsh 0-2, J Sheahan, L Lacey 0-1 each.

31 October 2026 Quarter-final	Kilshannig (Cork)	3-21 - 0-14	Ardmore (Waterford)	O'Connell Memorial Park
	P Walsh 1-5 (1-1 f), R Crowley, T Cunningham 1-2 each, K Twomey (0-1 f, 0-1 65), J Twomey 0-3 each, Diarmuid O’Sullivan, C Ruby, A Hourigan, S Lyons, B Curtin, D Guiney 0-1 each.	Report	S Keating 0-7 (0-2 f), C Keating 0-3, J O’Brien 0-2, O O’Dwyer, S Prendergast 0-1 each.

=== Munster semi-finals ===
14 November 2026 Semi-final	Caherline (Limerick)	2-20 - 0-13	Dr Crokes (Kerry)	Fr Hayes Memorial Park
	H Murnane (2-5; 0-3f); A Brennan (0-6); P Wixted, S Whelan (0-2 each); S McElligott, A Power, P McCarthy, J Kennedy, James Enright (0-1 each).	Report	M Heffernan (0-12; 9f, 2 ‘65); M Horgan (0-1).	Referee: P O’Mahoney (Cork)

14 November 2026 Semi-final	Kilshannig (Cork)	0-18 - 1-12	Fethard (Tipperary)	Fethard GAA Grounds
	P Walsh 0-10 (0-8f), J Twomey 0-4, É O’Hanlon, A Hourigan, K Twomey, B Curtin 0-1 each.	Report	D Barry 0-6 (0-5f), M Coen 1-1, M Neville 0-2, R Walsh, J Sheehan, J Davey 0-1 each.	Referee: E O’Leary (Clare)

=== Munster final ===
28 November 2026 Final	Caherline (Limerick)	v	Kilshannig (Cork)	FBD Semple Stadium

== Ulster Junior Club Hurling Championship ==
The details about the Ulster Junior Club Hurling Championship draw.

=== Ulster first round ===
21 October 2026 First Round	Omagh St Enda's (Tyrone)	6-25 - 0-08	Erne Gaels (Fermanagh)	O'Neills Healy Park
	T McClements 1-11, B O'Neill 2-1, F Corry 1-2, O O'Neill 1-1, P O'Grady 1-1, C Cunningham 0-2, D Sally 0-2, C Lagan 0-2, E Campbell 0-2, D Haigney 0-1.		S Curran 0-6, C McManus 0-1, E Magee 0-1.

=== Ulster quarter-finals ===
31 October 2026 Quarter-final	Cootehill Celtic (Cavan)	1-17 - 4-19	Patrick Sarsfields (Antrim)	Kingspan Breffni
	M Moffett 0-6, C Delaney 0-4, D McKeever 0-4, D Carney 0-2, S Clekin 0-1.	Report	K McKernan 0-9 ( 8 frees), D Delander 1-3, F Jemfrey 1-2, N O’Mullane 1-0, O Coleman 1-0, C McKernan 0-2, G Lennon 0-1, C Mulligan 0-1, D Smyth 0-1.

31 October 2026 Quarter-final	Swatragh (Derry)	5-30 - 0-07	Killeavy (Armagh)	Owenbeg GAA Centre of Excellence
	J Friel 0-9 (7f), C Murray 0-8, F McGurk 1-4, E O’Kane 1-2, C Murray 1-0, R Tohill 0-3 (3f), D Bradley 1-0, C Quinn 0-2, P Turner 0-1, SM Quinn 0-1.	Report	J O’Connor 0-3 (3f), G McMullan 0-2, D McMullan 0-1, U O’Neill 0-1.

31 October 2026 Quarter-final	Truagh Gaels (Monaghan)	3-15 - 0-13	Sean Mac Cumhaills (Donegal)	St Mellan's Park
	D Ó Domhnaill and G Mohan 1-2 each; O Hagan 0-3; P Treanor 1-0; D Carville 0-3,1f; C Boyle 0-2; C McKenna 0-1; N Flood and N Coyle 0-1 each.	Report	C Matthewson 0-3,1f; F Griffin and D Donnelly 0-3 each; D Patton 0-2; S Brady Devenney and J Malone 0-1 each.

31 October 2026 Quarter-final	Omagh St Enda's (Tyrone)	1-13 - 2-16	Castlewellan (Down)	O'Neills Healy Park
	T McClements 1-6, C Lloyd 0-2, F Corry 0-2, C Lagan 0-1, B Gallagher 0-1, C Cunningham 0-1	Report	T Connolly 1-6, M McCabe 1-3, R Walsh 0-3, D Rodgers 0-2, S O’Neill 0-1, E Fitzsimmons 0-1

=== Ulster semi-finals ===
7 November 2026 Semi-final	Castlewellan (Down)	1-13 - 0-12	Truagh Gaels (Monaghan)	Keely Park
	D McVeigh 1-0, M McCabe 0-5, S O’Neill and T Connolly (2fs) 0-3 each, R Walsh and M Muldoon 0-1 each	Report	O Hagan 0-5, 3fs, D Carville 0-4, M Flood, P Treanor and G Mohan 0-1 each

7 November 2026 Semi-final	Patrick Sarsfields (Antrim)	1-13 - 1-21	Swatragh (Derry)	Antrim Centre of Excellence
	K McKernan 0-8 (7F), O Coleman 1-0, E McArtan 0-2, C McKernan 0-1, D McKernan 0-1; G Lennon 0-1.	Report	J Friel 0-6 (6F), Cahal Murray 0-6; E O’Kane 1-2, F McGurk 0-3, Conor Murray 0-2; M McCormack 0-2.

=== Ulster final ===
14 November 2026 Final	Castlewellan (Down)	0-08 - 3-18	Swatragh (Derry)	Mullaghmoyle Park
	T Connolly 0-4 (4f), M McCabe 0-3, S O’Neill 0-1.	Report	J Friel 1-10 (7f, 2 65), E O’Kane 1-2, Conor Murray 1-0, CJ Quinn 0-2, F McGurk 0-2, M McCormack 0-2.

=== Ulster twinning final ===
29 November 2026 Twinning Final	Swatragh (Derry)	v	Fr Murphy's (London)	Ulster venue

== All-Ireland Junior Club Hurling Championship ==
=== All-Ireland semi-final ===
19/20 December 2026 Semi-final	Sylane (Galway)	v	Munster	TBC

2/3 January 2027 Semi-final	Ulster/Britain	v	Leinster	TBC

=== All-Ireland final ===
9/10 January 2027 Final	Semi-final Winner 1	v	Semi-final Winner 2	Croke Park

== Championship statistics ==
=== Top scorers ===
Rank	Player	Club	Tally	Total	Matches	Average
1	James Friel	Swatragh	1-25	28	3	9.33
2	Tom McClements	Omagh St Enda's	2-17	23	2	11.50
3	Evan Nolan	Dunderry	2-16	22	2	11.00
4	Paddy Walsh	Kilshannig	1-15	18	2	9.00
4	Mark O'Neill	Gusserane O'Rahilly's	0-18	18	2	9.00
6	Kevin McKernan	Patrick Sarsfields	0-17	17	2	8.50
7	Tiernan Connolly	Castlewellan	1-13	16	3	5.33
8	Eoghan O'Kane	Swatragh	3-06	15	3	5.00
8	Seán Ryan	Gusserane O'Rahilly's	2-09	15	2	7.50
10	Matthew McCabe	Castlewellan	1-11	14	3	4.66
10	Eoghan Neville	Shamrocks	0-14	14	1	14.00
10	Cathal Murray	Swatragh	0-14	14	3	4.66
13	Danny Barry	Fethard	0-13	13	2	6.50
13	Conor Heffernan	Turin	0-13	13	1	13.00
13	Edmond Delaney	Conahy Shamrocks	0-13	13	1	13.00
