= 2008 Derry county hurling team season =

The following is a summary of Derry county hurling team's 2008 season.

== 2008 National Hurling League ==
10 February 2008
Round 1
Report:

Meath	0-08 – 1-25	Derry
Stephen Clinch 1-04, Niall Hackett 0-07 (0-02 frees, 0-02 65s), Joey Kenna 0-04, Ger O’Neill 0-04, David Raleigh 0-02, Barry Slevin 0-02, David Crimmins and Andrew Snow 0-01 each.		Ruairi Convery 0-05 (0-03 frees), Paddy Henry, Ben Dodds and Phillip McGlade 0-01 each.

Attendance: ?
Referee: Darren Magee (Down)
17 February 2008
Round 2
Report:

Derry	3-11 – 0-09	London
Ruairi Convery 2-06 (0-03 frees), Gavin Kelly 1-00, Paddy Henry 0-03, Oisin McCloskey and Sean McCullagh 0-01 each.		Martin Finn 0-06 (0-05 frees, 0-01 65), Mark Mythen 0-02, Conor O’Halloran 0-01 each.

Attendance: ?
Referee: ?
9 March 2008
Round 3
Report:

Armagh	2-13 – 3-11	Derry
Declan Coulter 1-07 (0-04 frees), Connor McCann 1-01, Barney McCann 0-02, Gerard Enright, Cahal Carvill and Christopher McAlinden 0-01 each.		Ruairi Convery 0-07 (0-05 frees, 0-01 sideline, 0-01 65), Gavin Kelly 2-00, Diarmuid Brunton 1-01, Paddy Henry, Kevin Hinphey and Oisin McCloskey 0-01 each.

?, Keady
Attendance: ?
Referee: Tiernach Mahon (Fermanagh)
16 March 2008
Round 4
Report:

Derry	2-19 – 3-14	Down
Ruairi Convery 2-07 (1-00 penalty, 0-05 frees, 0-01 65), Paddy Henry 0-05 (0-02 frees), Kevin Hinphey 0-02, Diarmuid Brunton 0-02, Patrick McCloskey 0-02, Oisin McCloskey 0-01.		Gareth Johnson 2-02, Gerard Coulter 1-00, James Coyle 0-03 (0-01 free), Patrick Coulter 0-03, Ruairi McGrattan 0-02, Brendan McGourty 0-02, Andy Savage and Stephen Clarke 0-01 each.

Fr. McNally Park, Banagher
Attendance: ?
Referee: John Devlin (Tyrone)
23 March 2008
Round 5
Report:

Carlow	1-14 – 1-07	Derry
.		Ruairi Convery 1-04 (1?-04 frees), Paddy Henry 0-03 (0-01 free).

Dr. Cullen Park, Carlow
Attendance: ?
Referee: ()

== Championship ==
=== 2008 Ulster Senior Hurling Championship ===
25 May 2008
Quarter-final
Report:

Derry	7-23 – 3-13	Monaghan
Kieth Biggs 7-23 stadium = Celtic Park, Derry

Attendance: ≈500
Referee: Tommy McIntyre (Antrim)
1 June 2008
8.00pm

Antrim	2-17 – 1-12	Derry
Paddy Richmond 2-03; Paul Shields 0-04 (0-01 free); Eddie McCloskey 0-04; Karl Stewart 0-03 (0-01 '65); Liam Watson 0-01 (0-01 free); P.J. O'Connell 0-01; Simon McCrory 0-01		Ruairi Convery 0-08 (0-08 frees); Gavin Kelly 1-01; Patrick McCloskey 0-02; Kevin Hinphey 0-01

Casement Park, Belfast
Attendance: ?
Referee: Declan Magee (Down)
