= Ollie Collins =

Irish hurler

Personal information
- Native name: Oilibhéar Ó Coileáin (Irish)
- Born: 1972 (age 53–54) Lavey, County Londonderry, Northern Ireland

Sport
- Sport: Hurling
- Position: Midfield
Club
- Years: Club
- Lavey
Club titles
- Derry titles: 9
Inter-county
- Years: County
- 1990-2003: Derry
Inter-county titles
- Ulster titles: 2
- All-Irelands: 0
- NHL: 0
- All Stars: 0

Oliver Collins (born 1972) is a former hurler from Northern Ireland, who played as a midfielder at senior level for the Derry county team.

Collins joined the panel during the 1989-90 National League and subsequently became a regular member of the starting fifteen until his retirement after the 2003 championship. During that time he won two Ulster winners' medals.

At club level Collins is a nine-time county club championship medalist with Lavey.
