= 2022 Derry Senior Hurling Championship =

Annual hurling competition season

- Teams: 8
- Sponsor: Leadon Timber Frame
- Champions: Slaughtneil (16th title); Cormac O'Doherty (captain); Michael McShane (manager)
- Runners-up: Kevin Lynch's; Shane Elliott (manager)

The 2022 Derry Senior Hurling Championship was the 77th staging of the Derry Senior Hurling Championship since its establishment by the Derry County Board in 1887. The draw for the group stage placings took place on 29 June 2022.

Slaughtneil entered the championship as the defending champions in search of a 10th consecutive title.

The final was played on 25 September 2022 at Owenbeg, between Slaughtneil and Kevin Lynch's in what was their eight meeting in the final overall and a fourth successive meeting. Slaughtneil won the match by 2–18 to 1–08 to claim their 16th championship title overall and a 10th title in succession.

== Knockout stage ==
=== Final ===
25 September 2022 Final	Slaughtneil	2-18 - 1-08	Kevin Lynch's	Owenbeg
	C O’Doherty (0-6, 5 frees, 1x ‘65’), Shane McGuigan (0-4), J McGuigan (1-1), B Rogers (1-1), S Cassidy, P McCullagh (0-2 each), R Ó Mianáin, K McKaigue (0-1 each)		O McKeever (1-1), R Mullan (0-3f), C Kelly (0-2), N Ferris, R Mullan (0-1 each)	Referee: T Conway (Ballinascreen)
