= Mark McGuigan =

Mark McGuigan or MacGuigan may refer to:

- Mark McGuigan (footballer) (born 1988), Scottish former professional footballer
- Mark McGuigan (hurler) (born 1995), Northern Irish hurler
- Mark MacGuigan (1931–1998), Canadian academic and politician
- Mark MacGuigan Sr. (1894–1972), Canadian educator, lawyer, judge, and political figure
