= Ruairí Convery =

Hurler from Northern Ireland

Personal information
- Born: 1984 (age 41–42) Swatragh, County Londonderry, Northern Ireland
- Occupation: Hurling coach

Sport
- Sport: Hurling
- Position: Left wing-forward
Club
- Years: Club
- Swatragh
Club titles
- Derry titles: 1
Inter-county
- Years: County
- 2003-2018: Derry
Inter-county titles
- Ulster titles: 0
- All-Irelands: 0
- NHL: 0
- All Stars: 0

Ruairí Convery (born 5 January 1984) is a hurler from Northern Ireland who played as a right wing-forward at senior level for the Derry county team.

Convery joined the panel during the 2003 National League and immediately became a regular member of the starting fifteen. Since then he has won two Nicky Rackard Cup medals and has ended up as an Ulster runner-up on two occasions.

At club level Convery is a one-time county club championship medalist with Swatragh.
