= Mark McGuigan (hurler) =

Irish hurler (born 1995)

Personal information
- Native name: Marc Mag Uiginn (Irish)
- Born: 1995 (age 30–31) Maghera, Northern Ireland

Sport
- Sport: Hurling
- Position: Midfield
Club
- Years: Club
- 2013-present: Slaughtneil
Club titles
- Derry titles: 13
- Ulster titles: 4
Inter-county
- Years: County
- 2016-2021: Derry
Inter-county titles
- Ulster titles: 0
- All-Irelands: 0
- NHL: 0
- All Stars: 0

Mark McGuigan (born 1995) is a Northern Irish hurler. At club level he plays with Slaughtneil, while he has also lined out at inter-county level in various grades with Derry.

== Career ==
McGuigan played competitive hurling while a student at St Patrick's College, and also played at juvenile and underage levels with the Slaughtneil club. He progressed to adult level and was part of Slaughtneil's run of 12 successive Derry SHC titles. McGuigan captained Slaughtneil to their 12th success in 2024. He has also won four Ulster SHC Club medals.

McGuigan first appeared on the inter-county scene for Derry during two years with the minor team. He later lined out with the under-21 team, including one season as team captain. McGuigan joined the senior team in 2016. He was a member of the extended panel when Derry won the Nicky Rackard Cup in 2017. McGuigan continued to line out with Derry until their defeat by Offaly in the 2021 Christy Ring Cup final.

== Honours ==
Slaughtneil

- Ulster Senior Club Hurling Championship: 2016, 2017, 2019, 2021
- Derry Senior Hurling Championship: 2013, 2014, 2015, 2016, 2017, 2018, 2019, 2020, 2021, 2022, 2023, 2024 (c), 2025 (c)

Derry

- Nicky Rackard Cup: 2017
