= Celtic Park (Derry) =

GAA stadium in Derry City, Northern Ireland

- Páirc na gCeilteach
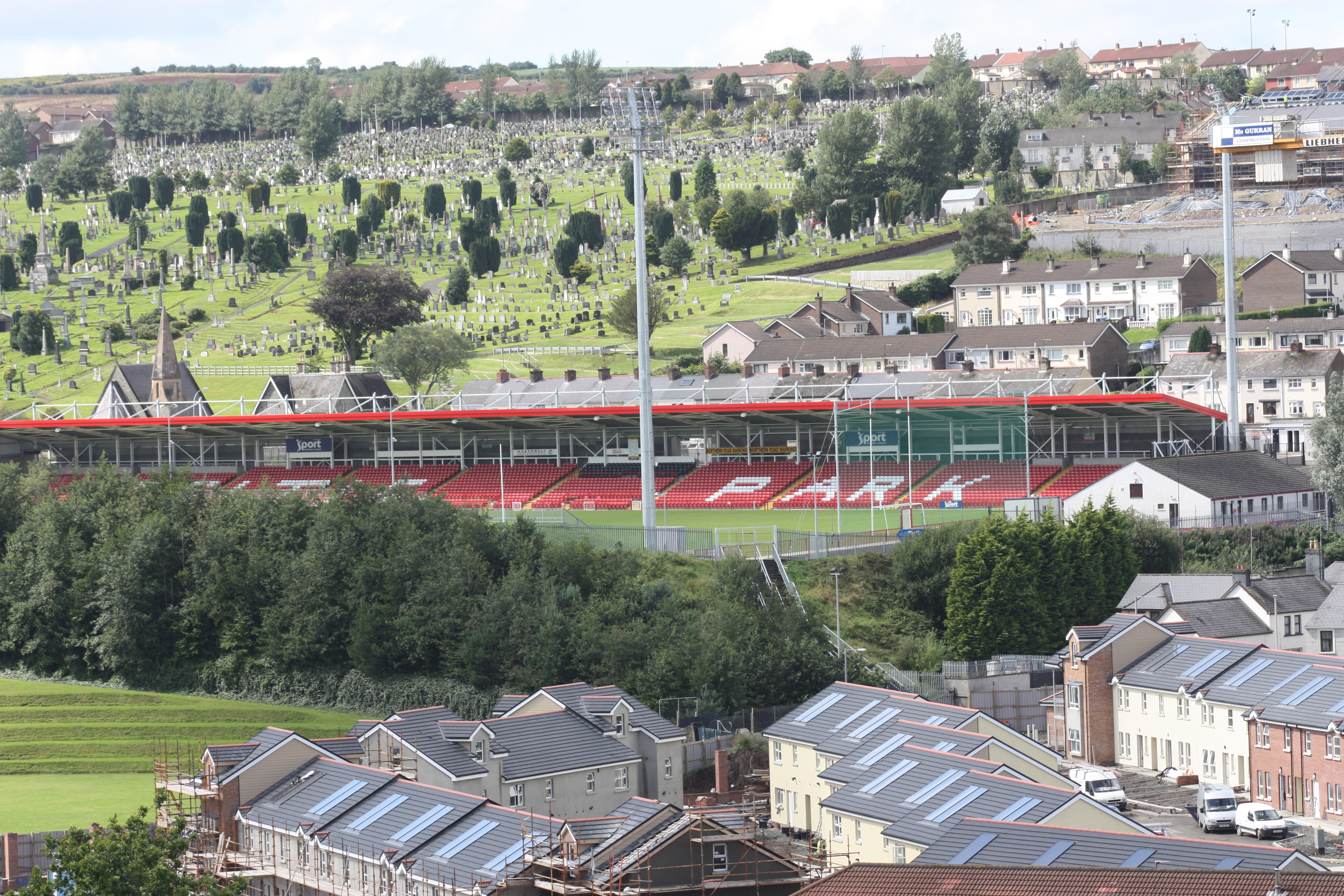

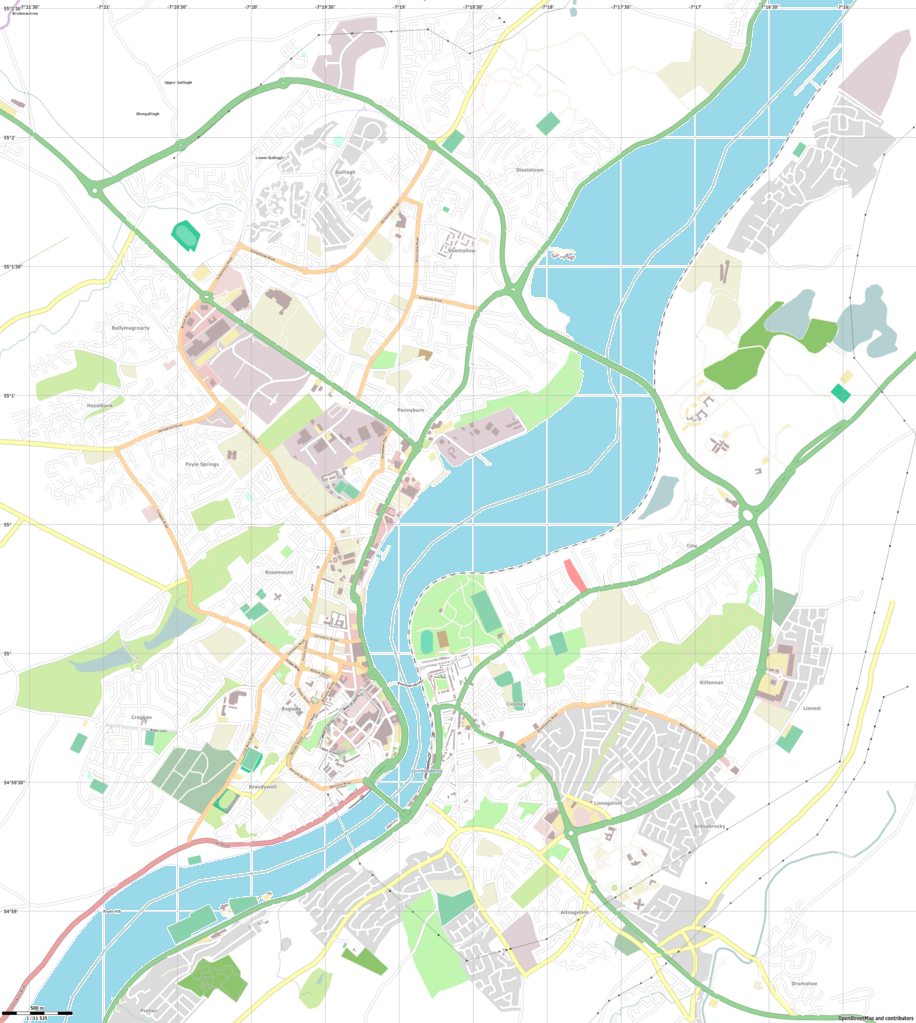
- Location within Derry
- Location: Derry, Northern Ireland
- Coordinates: 54°59′36″N 7°20′1″W
- Owner: Derry GAA
- Capacity: 18,500
- Field size: 138 m × 84 m (453 ft × 276 ft)
- Public transit: Waterside railway station Clarendon Manor bus stop (Foyle Metro route 10A)

Construction
- Renovated: 2009

Celtic Park (/ˈsɛltɪk/) (Irish: Páirc na gCeilteach), officially branded as Find Insurance Celtic Park, is a GAA stadium in Derry, Northern Ireland. With a capacity of about 18,000, the ground is the primary home of Derry's hurling and Gaelic football teams.

Home football games are also sometimes held in Owenbeg, Dungiven. Hurling games, on occasion, take place at Lavey or Fr. McNally Park, Banagher.

As well as staging inter-county matches, it is often used to host Derry football and hurling games at the club level. In recent years, the Derry Senior Football Championship final has usually been held at the ground. The ground hosts the Derry Intermediate Football Championship final and the Derry Junior Football Championship final.

== History ==
It was previously used for association football as the home of Derry Celtic F.C. in the Irish League from 1900–1913. Derry Celtic was the forerunner to Derry City, who had the opportunity to purchase the ground in 1933 but hesitated on a decision, and the Derry County Board bought it ten years later.

The venue has been hosting Derry inter-county games since the 1930s. Over the years, Dean McGlinchey Park in Ballinascreen hosted most Derry football games, but since the 1990s, Celtic Park has established itself as the county's primary stadium.

League of Ireland side, Derry City played several games at Celtic Park during the 2026 season while a new hybrid pitch was laid at their home ground, Ryan McBride Brandywell Stadium. 2026 also saw Celtic Park get a naming rights sponsor as locally-based commercial insurance brokerage Find Insurance signed a multi-year deal with Derry GAA to sponsor both the stadium and the association's centre of excellence in Owenbeg.

== Recent redevelopments ==
Floodlights were erected over the end of 2007 / start of 2008 and were first used for the National League game between Derry and Mayo on 2 February 2008. The official unveiling of the lights was held a few weeks later during the National League tie against Tyrone on 5 April.

In the last couple of years, despite being able to hold more, the capacity had been limited to 13,000 for safety reasons. However, this was not set to change, as the venue is currently undergoing a £1.8 million revamp.. Work on a new all-seater stand on the Lone Moor Road side of the ground started a few days after the 2008 Derry Championship final. It was to hold 3,600 people, bringing the total stadium capacity to 18,000 or nearly 20,000. Other new developments in the revamped stand include a control room, T.V. gantry, media room, stewards' room, extra exit gates, improved disabled access, and improved toilet facilities. The developments will make the stadium "among the best in Ulster".

The developments were not completed until the start of the Summer (2009), therefore Derry's home 2009 National League games had to be played elsewhere, most likely Glen or Ballinascreen. The renovations were completed in time for Derry's Ulster Senior Football Championship game with Monaghan (24 May).

== See also ==
- List of Gaelic Athletic Association stadiums
- List of stadiums in Ireland by capacity
