= Derry Senior Hurling Championship =

Annual hurling competition

- Current season or competition: 2026 Derry Senior Hurling Championship
- Irish: Craobh Shinsear Iomána Dhoire
- Code: Hurling
- Founded: 1887
- Region: Derry (GAA)
- Trophy: Fr Collins Cup
- No. of teams: 8
- Title holders: Slaughtneil (20th title)
- Most titles: Kevin Lynch's (23 titles)
- Sponsors: Leadon Timber Frame

The Derry Senior Hurling Championship is an annual hurling competition contested by top-tier Derry GAA clubs. The Derry County Board of the Gaelic Athletic Association has organised it since 1887.

Slaughtneil are the title holders, defeating Kevin Lynch's in the Final in September 2026 to win their fourteenth title in a row.

== Honours ==
The trophy presented to the winners is the Fr Collins Cup.

The winners qualify to represent their county in the Ulster Senior Club Hurling Championship. The winners can, in turn, go on to play in the All-Ireland Senior Club Hurling Championship.

Slaughtneil are the only Derry team to have ever won the Ulster Senior Club Hurling Championship lifting the Four Seasons Cup on six occasions.

== Format ==
The format of the championship was changed in 2026. Currently, there is no group phase. Instead a knock-out format with a back-door for the intermediate and junior title is established.

=== Round 1 ===
8 teams are participating in 4 matches. The 4 winners advance to Qualifier 1 A, the 4 losers to Qualifier 1B.

=== Qualifier 1A ===
The 4 winners of Round 1 are participating. The 2 winners qualifiy for the Senior final. The 2 losers advance to the IHC/JHC qualifier.

=== Qualifier 1B ===
The 4 losers of Round 1 are participating. The 2 winners advance to the IHC/JHC qualifier.

=== IHC/JHC qualifier ===
The 4 teams with 1 win and 1 loss in the previous rounds are participating. The 2 winners qualify for the Intermediate final. The 2 losers to the Junior final

=== Senior / Intermediate / Junior final ===
The 6 teams qualifying for the 3 finals determine the Champions of the 3 tiers.

=== Qualification ===
At the end of the championship, the winning team qualify to the subsequent Ulster Senior Club Hurling Championship.

== Teams ==
=== 2026 Teams ===
8 teams competed in the 2026 Derry Senior Hurling Championship.

Team	Location	Colours	Position in 2026	Championship titles	Last championship title
Ballinascreen	Draperstown	Maroon and white	Junior runners-up	3	1939
Banagher	Feeny / Park	Maroon and white	Intermediate runners-up	3	2005
Eoghan Rua	Coleraine	Maroon and green	Qualifier	0	—
Kevin Lynch's	Dungiven	White and black	Runners-up	23	2011
Lavey	Lavey	Orange and black	Intermediate champions	18	2010
Na Magha	Derry	Green, white, and black	Qualifier	0	—
Slaughtneil	Slaughtneil	Maroon and white	Champions	20	2026
Swatragh	Swatragh	Green and white	Junior champion	1	2012

== List of finals ==
=== Legend ===
- Gold – Ulster senior club champions
- Silver – Ulster senior club runners-up

=== List of Derry SHC finals ===
Year	Winners		Runners-up	
Year	Club	Score	Club	Score
2026	Slaughtneil	0-20	Kevin Lynch's	1-14
2025	Slaughtneil	3-24	Kevin Lynch's	1-10
2024	Slaughtneil	0-16	Banagher	0-04
2023	Slaughtneil	3-23	Kevin Lynch's	1-09
2022	Slaughtneil	2-18	Kevin Lynch's	1-08
2021	Slaughtneil	1-17	Kevin Lynch's	2-09
2020	Slaughtneil	0-23	Kevin Lynch's	0-11
2019	Slaughtneil	1-23	Kevin Lynch's	2-12
2018	Slaughtneil	2-12	Banagher	0-10
2017	Slaughtneil	2-18	Banagher	0-14
2016	Slaughtneil	2-19	Banagher	1-12
2015	Slaughtneil	5-26	Swatragh	1-05
2014	Slaughtneil	2-11	Kevin Lynch's	2-09
2013	Slaughtneil	4-13	Ballinascreen	2-11
2012	Swatragh	2-10	Banagher	1-07
2011	Kevin Lynch's	5-11	Lavey	1-07
2010	Lavey	3-10	Kevin Lynch's	0-11
2009	Kevin Lynch's	2-15	Slaughtneil	1-13
2008 ,	Kevin Lynch's	1-12	Swatragh	0-12
2007	Kevin Lynch's	2-17	Banagher	1-11
2006	Kevin Lynch's	3-12	Banagher	2-14
2005	Banagher	2-09	Kevin Lynch's	1-11
2004	Kevin Lynch's	4-09	Slaughtneil	1-09
2003	Kevin Lynch's		Ballinascreen	
2002	Lavey	1-12	Slaughtneil	0-07
2001	Lavey	3-18	Banagher	2-11
2000	Slaughtneil	1-14	Banagher	2-08
1999	Lavey		Kevin Lynch's	
1998	Kevin Lynch's		Slaughtneil	
1997	Lavey		Ballinascreen	
1996	Kevin Lynch's		Banagher	
1995	Lavey		Slaughtneil	
1994	Lavey		Slaughtneil	
1993	Slaughtneil		Lavey	
1992	Lavey		Slaughtneil	
1991	Lavey		Kevin Lynch's	
1990	Lavey		Drum	
1989	Kevin Lynch's		Ballinascreen	
1988	Lavey		Ballinascreen	
1987	Kevin Lynch's		Ballinascreen	
1986	Lavey		Kevin Lynch's	
1985	Lavey		Kevin Lynch's	
1984	Kevin Lynch's		Ballinascreen	
1983	Kevin Lynch's			
1982	Kevin Lynch's			
1981	Kevin Lynch's			
1980	Banagher			
1979	Kevin Lynch's			
1978	Banagher			
1977	Kevin Lynch's			
1976	Kevin Lynch's		Ballinascreen	
1975	Kevin Lynch's			
1974	Kevin Lynch's			
1973	Kevin Lynch's			
1972	Kevin Lynch's			
1970–1971	No competition			
1969	Slaughtneil			
1968	Slaughtneil			
1967	Kevin Lynch's			
1966	Slaughtneil			
1965	Slaughtneil			
1964	St Finbarr's, Loup			
1963	St Finbarr's, Loup			
1962	Lavey			
1949–1961	No competition			
1948	Lavey			
1947	No competition			
1946	Lavey		Kevin Barry's, Derry^{†}	
1945	Mitchels Coleraine			
1944	Lavey		Sarsfields, Derry	
1943	Mitchels Coleraine		Lavey	
1941–1942	No competition			
1940	Lavey			
1939	Ballinascreen			
1938	Ballinascreen			
1937	Aileach			
1935–1936	No competition			
1934	Sarsfields, Derry			
1933	Sarsfields, Derry			
1932	No competition			
1931	Burt	4-00	Gaels	1-02
1930	Burt			
1907–1929	No competition			
1906	Éire Óg			
1905	St Patrick's, Waterside^{†}			
1892–1904	No competition			
1891	St Patrick's, Waterside^{†}			
1890	No competition			
1889	Hibernians			
1887	Ballinascreen			

=== Notes ===
- † 1891, 1905: St Patrick's, Waterside is now defunct. It was a club from the Waterside in Derry City.
- †† 1946: Kevin Barry's is now defunct. It was a club from Derry City.

== Roll of honour ==
=== By club ===
#	Club	Titles	Runners-up	Championship wins	Championships runner-up
1	Kevin Lynch's	23	14	1967^{†}, 1972^{†}, 1973^{†}, 1974^{†}, 1975^{†}, 1976^{†}, 1977^{†}, 1979^{†}, 1981^{†}, 1982, 1983, 1984, 1987, 1989, 1996, 1998, 2003, 2004, 2006, 2007, 2008, 2009, 2011	1985, 1986, 1991, 1999, 2005, 2010, 2014, 2019, 2020, 2021, 2022, 2023, 2025, 2026
2	Slaughtneil	20	7	1965, 1966, 1968, 1969, 1993, 2000, 2013, 2014, 2015, 2016, 2017, 2018, 2019, 2020, 2021, 2022, 2023, 2024, 2025, 2026	1992, 1994, 1995, 1998, 2002, 2004, 2009
3	Lavey	18	3	1940, 1944, 1946, 1948, 1962, 1985, 1986, 1988, 1990, 1991, 1992, 1994, 1995, 1997, 1999, 2001, 2002, 2010	1943, 1993, 2011
4	Banagher	3	10	1978, 1980, 2005	1996, 2000, 2001, 2006, 2007, 2012, 2016, 2017, 2018, 2024
4	Ballinascreen	3	8	1887, 1938, 1939	1976, 1984, 1987, 1988, 1989, 1997, 2003, 2013
6	Sarsfields Derry	2	1	1933, 1934	1944
6	Burt^{††}	2	0	1930, 1931	—
6	St Patrick's, Waterside	2	0	1891, 1905	—
6	Mitchels Coleraine	2	0	1943, 1945	—
6	St Finbarr's Loup	2	0	1963, 1964	—
11	Swatragh	1	2	2012	2008, 2015
11	Hibernians	1	0	1889	—
11	Éire Óg	1	0	1906	—
11	Aileach	1	0	1937	—
15	Gaels	0	1	—	1931
15	Kevin Barry’s	0	1	—	1946
15	Drum	0	1	—	1990

=== Notes ===
- † — The 1967, 1972, 1973, 1974, 1975, 1976, 1977, 1979 and 1981 titles were won as Dungiven GAC.
- †† — Burt is a Donegal club.

== See also ==
- Derry Intermediate Hurling Championship
- Derry Junior Hurling Championship
