= CLG Eoghan Rua =

Derry-based Gaelic games club

Eoghan Rua CLG Cúil Raithin
- Founded: 1957
- County: Derry
- Nickname: The Roes
- Colours: Maroon and green
- Grounds: Eoghan Rua Pitch, Portstewart
- Coordinates: 55°09′53.79″N 6°41′41.97″W

Playing kits
Home Kit	Change Kit

Senior Club Championships
	All Ireland	Ulster champions	Derry champions
Football:	-	-	2

CLG Eoghan Rua Cúil Raithin is a Gaelic Athletic Association club based in Coleraine, County Londonderry, Northern Ireland. Despite some of the club's catchment area being in County Antrim, the club is a member of the Derry GAA. Eoghan Rua currently cater for Gaelic Football, Hurling, Camogie and Ladies' Gaelic football and also compete in Scór and Scór n nÓg. The club's name commemorates Eoghan Rua Ó Néill.

In addition to drawing players from Coleraine, the club's catchment area includes Portstewart and Portrush. The club's grounds are on the main road between Coleraine and Portstewart and were completed in 2007. Underage teams up to U-12s play in North Derry league and championships; from U-14 upwards teams compete in All-Derry competitions.

The club's biggest success was when they won the 2010 & 2018 Derry Senior Football Championship. In 2006 they won the Ulster Intermediate Club Football Championship and the Derry Intermediate Football Championship for the first time.

== History ==
=== Gaelic football ===
CLG Eoghan Rua were established in 1957. The club first major football success came in 1997 when they won the Derry Junior Club Football Championship, defeating Lissan in the final. In 2006 they won the Derry Intermediate Club final in 2006. The team went on to win the 2006 Ulster Intermediate Club Football Championship, with victory over Ballymacna of Armagh in the final (which was played in February 2007 due to delays). In the All-Ireland Club semi-final they beat Mayo champions Tourmakeady, before losing narrowly to Ardfert of Kerry in the All-Ireland Intermediate Club Football Championship final on 10 March 2007 in Croke Park.

In May 2006 Barry McGoldrick became the first Eoghan Rua player to play in the All-Ireland Senior Football Championship when he was part of the Derry team that defeated Tyrone in the first round of the Ulster Championship in Healy Park. His brother, Seán Leo McGoldrick made his debut for Derry in the 2007 McKenna Cup v Queen's University Belfast. Both have also played for Derry hurlers.

In 2007 they became champions of Derry ACFL Division 3, winning promotion Division 2 for the first time in their history.

=== Hurling ===
Previous to the founding of CLG Eoghan Rua, there had been a hurling club in Coleraine called Mitchel's and they had won the 1943 and 1945 Derry Senior Hurling Championships. Eoghan Rua entered a Senior Hurling team in 2002, having fielded underage teams for a few years before this. 2006 saw the club win both the Derry Intermediate Hurling Championship and the Derry Junior Hurling Championship.

=== Camogie ===
A Senior Camogie team fielded for the first time in 2001/2? The club won their first Derry Intermediate Camogie Championship in 2005 and again in 2007. They won the Derry Premier Championship in 2010 and the Ulster Senior B Championship in the same year. Current senior camógs Gráinne McGoldrick, Jane Carey, Méabh McGoldrick and Roma McDonald were on the Derry senior squad that contested the 2006 All-Ireland Junior Camogie Final. They were defeated by Dublin. The same four players were part of the Derry team that went one step further in 2007 and won the All-Ireland Junior Camogie Championship, defeating Clare in the final.

In 2010 the camogie teams won the Derry Premier League and Championship Double completing both campaigns unbeaten. They went on to win the Ulster Senior B Championship.

Eoghan Rua and Derry forward Gráinne McGoldrick received a camogie All Star in 2009.

== Titles won ==
=== Football ===
==== Senior ====
- All-Ireland Kilmacud 7's Championship: 1
  - 2017
- Derry Senior Football Championship: 2
  - 2010, 2018
- Derry Division 1 Football League: 1
  - 2017
- Derry Division 2 Football League: 1
  - 2009
- Derry Division 3 Football League 1
  - 2007
- Ulster Senior Football League: 2
  - 2017, 2018
- Dr Kerlin Cup: 2
  - 2017, 2019
- Ulster Intermediate Football Championship: 1
  - 2006
- Derry Intermediate Football Championship: 1
  - 2006
- Derry Junior Football Championship: 1
  - 1997
- Derry Junior Football League: 2
  - 1997, 2000

==== Minor ====
- Tommy O'Neill Cup (Derry Minor 'B' Football Championship) 1
  - 2000
- North Derry Minor 'B' Football Championship: 1
  - 2000

=== Hurling ===
- Ulster Junior Club Hurling Championship: 2
  - 2015, 2019
- Derry Intermediate Hurling Championship: 2
  - 2006, 2022
- Derry Junior Hurling Championship: 2?
  - 2006, 2019

=== Camogie ===
- All-Ireland Intermediate Camogie Championship
  - 2010, 2011
- Ulster Senior Camogie Championship
  - 2013
- Ulster Intermediate Camogie Championship
  - 2010, 2011
- Derry Senior Camogie Championship
  - 2010, 2011, 2013, 2014
- Derry Intermediate Camogie Championship:
  - 2005, 2007

== Notable players ==
- Barry McGoldrick; first Eoghan Rua player to play for Derry in All-Ireland Senior Football Championship.

== See also ==
- Derry Intermediate Football Championship
- List of Gaelic games clubs in Derry
