= Owenbeg Derry GAA Centre =

GAA stadium in Northern Ireland

Owenbeg
- Location within Northern Ireland
- Location: Dungiven, Northern Ireland
- Coordinates: 54°55′27″N 6°57′11″W
- Owner: Derry GAA
- Capacity: approx. 7200

Construction
- Opened: 2013

Owenbeg Derry GAA Centre is a Gaelic Athletic Association (GAA) stadium in Owenbeg, Dungiven, Northern Ireland. With a capacity of about 7,200, the ground is the secondary home of Derry's hurling and Gaelic football teams, as well as being the main training complex for the county. The main stand is all-seated, and has a capacity of 2,700.

As well as staging inter-county matches, it is often used to host Derry football and hurling games at club level.

== History ==
Development started on the site on 23 May 2011, and the ground was officially opened in August 2013.

The ground was also used in the 2023 GAA World Games, and hosted the 2025 and 2026 Féile na nÓg.

== See also ==
- List of Gaelic Athletic Association stadiums
- List of stadiums in Ireland by capacity
