= Swatragh GAC =

Derry-based Gaelic games club

Michael Davitt GAC Swatragh
- CLG Mhíceál Mhic Dhaíbheid, Suaitreach
- Founded: 1946
- County: Derry
- Nickname: The Swa
- Colours: Green and white
- Grounds: Davitt Park
- Coordinates: 54°54′59.81″N 6°39′46.93″W

Playing kits
Standard colours

Michael Davitt's GAC Swatragh (Irish: CLG Míceal Mhic Dhaíbheid Suaitreach) is a Gaelic Athletic Association club based in the village of Swatragh, Northern Ireland. The club is a member of the Derry GAA and currently caters for Gaelic football, hurling and camogie. The club is named after republican patriot and revolutionary Michael Davitt.

Swatragh fields Gaelic football and hurling teams at U8, U10, U12, U14, U16, Minor, Reserve, Thirds and Senior levels. There are also camogie teams across similar age groups.

== History ==
In 1946 John McCormack proposed the idea of forming a Gaelic football club in Swatragh. Other founder members included Patsy Collins, Jim McMullan, John Eddie Friel and James McGurk. They choose to name the club after Michael Davitt, because he had given Irish Land League speeches in Swatragh in the late 19th century. It also marked 100 years since Davitt's birth. The club colours were initially red and white, but in 1949 the present green and white colours were adopted.

The club's first major success came in 1952 when it won the South Derry Junior Football Championship and the South Derry Junior Football League. Swatragh regained the South Derry Junior Championship in 1955 and went on to win that year's Derry Junior Football Championship. Davitt's added a further Derry Junior Championship in 1961. In 1972 Swatragh won its first Derry Intermediate Football Championship and won it again seven years later. In 1988 the club won the Derry Minor Football Championship.

In 1993 the club reached the Derry Senior Football Championship final for the only time in their history, but were defeated by Lavey GAC on St Stephen's Day (the fixture was moved back by a few months due to the senior county team winning the 1993 All-Ireland Senior Football Championship).

Hurling began in the club in 1976, under the stewardship of Patsy Quigg. Since then, the club has, at one stage or another, collected every underage title available. They have appeared in three Derry Senior Hurling Championship finals. They lost out to Kevin Lynch's of Dungiven in 2008 and to Robert Emmet's Slaughtneil in 2015 but secured the club's only (male) Senior title to date when they defeated St Mary's Banagher in the 2012 decider in Celtic Park.

== Honours ==
=== Football ===
==== Senior ====
- Derry Intermediate Football Championship: 3
  - 1972, 1979, 2012
- Derry Junior Football Championship: 2
  - 1955, 1961
- South Derry Junior Football Championship: 1
  - 1952, 1955
- South Derry Junior Football League: 1
  - 1952
- Graham Cup Champions: 1
  - 2007
- McGlinchey Cup Champions: 1
  - 2009

==== Minor ====
- Derry Minor Football Championship: 1
  - 1988
- South Derry Minor League and Championship Winners: 1
  - 1996

=== Hurling ===
==== Senior ====
- Ulster Junior Club Hurling Championship: 1
  - 2026
- Derry Senior Hurling Championship: 1
  - 2012
- Derry Intermediate Hurling Championship: 6
  - 1997, 1998, 2018, 2020, 2024, 2025
- Derry Junior Hurling Championship: 2
  - 2023, 2026
- Oireachtas Cup: 3
  - 2006, 2007, 2009
- Derry Senior Hurling League: 2
  - 2008, 2011
- Ulster Hurling League Division 2: 1
  - 2008

==== Minor ====
- Derry Minor Hurling Championship: 1
  - 2004

=== Camogie ===
- Ulster Senior Club Camogie Championship: 5
  - 1983, 1988, 1989, 1990, 2000
- Derry Senior Club Camogie Championship: 28
  - 1974, 1975, 1976, 1977, 1978, 1979, 1980, 1981, 1982, 1983, 1984, 1985, 1986, 1987, 1988, 1989, 1990, 1991, 1992, 2000, 2001, 2003, 2005, 2024, 2026 (+ 3 years missing before 2005)
- U-14 All Ireland Féile champions 2008, Ulster Féile champions 2008

== Well known players ==
- Anthony Tohill – member of Derry's 1993 All-Ireland winning team. Four-time All Star winner.
- Ruairí Convery – Derry hurler and former Derry footballer. Was part of the Derry Minor side that won the 2002 Ulster Minor Championship and All-Ireland Minor Championship.

== See also ==
- Derry Senior Football Championship
- Derry Senior Hurling Championship
- List of Gaelic games clubs in Derry
- Enda McGinley, former manager with the club
