= Kevin Lynch's Hurling Club =

Derry-based Gaelic games club

Kevin Lynch Hurling Club
- Cumann lomanaíochta Chaoimhín Uí Loinsigh
- Founded: 1981
- County: Derry
- Nickname: Lynchs
- Colours: White and black
- Grounds: Kevin Lynch Park, Dungiven
- Coordinates: 54°55′20.96″N 6°54′15.71″W

Playing kits
Standard colours

Senior Club Championships
| | All Ireland | Ulster champions | Derry champions |
|---|---|---|---|
| Hurling: | - | - | 23* |

Kevin Lynch Hurling Club (Irish: Cumann lomanaíochta Chaoimhín Uí Loinsigh) is a Gaelic Athletic Association club based in Dungiven, County Londonderry, Northern Ireland. They currently cater for hurling. The Gaelic football and ladies' Gaelic football club in the town is St. Canice's GAC.

== History ==
Dungiven has two Gaelic Athletic Association clubs. The Gaelic football club called Dungiven GAC was founded in 1943 and originally included a hurling section. In 1981 the hurling section of Dungiven GAC was renamed in honour of Kevin Lynch from Dungiven who died on the 1981 Irish hunger strike, whilst the football team retained the existing name. Kevin Lynch's club retained the hurling honours won as Dungiven as part of its history.

== Hurling titles ==
* = Includes championships won as part of Dungiven GAC

- Derry Senior Hurling Championship
  - 1967, 1972, 1973, 1974, 1975, 1976, 1977, 1979, 1980, 1981, 1982, 1984, 1987, 1986, 1996, 1998, 2003, 2004, 2006, 2007, 2008, 2009, 2011
- Derry Junior Hurling Championship
  - 2001

Note: The above lists may be incomplete. Please add any other honours you know of.

Derry Hurling Championship winning line-ups:

| Year | Kevin Lynch's line-up in final | Opponent | Ref |
|---|---|---|---|
| 2008 | Brian Lagan; Mark Craig, Conal McCloskey, Eoghin Farren; Paul Sweeney, Liam Hinphey (c), Aaron McCloskey; Ciaran Herron, Kevin Hinphey; Barry Kelly, Emmett McKeever, Geoffrey McGonigle; Fergal McGuigan, Feidhlim Kelly, Ryan O’Kane. Subs used:Mark McCormick for Barry Kelly (36 mins) | Swatragh | |

== Notable hurlers ==
- Kieran McKeever - former Derry dual player
- Brian McGilligan - former Derry dual player
- Geoffrey McGonagle - former Derry dual player

== See also ==
- Derry Senior Hurling Championship
- List of Gaelic games clubs in Derry
