= Ballinascreen GAC =

Derry-based Gaelic games club

St Colm's Ballinascreen GAC
- CLG Naomh Colm Baile na Scrine
- Founded: 1933
- County: Derry
- Nickname: Screen
- Colours: Maroon and White
- Grounds: Dean McGlinchey Park (Páirc Mhig Loingsigh)
- Coordinates: 54°46′57.45″N 6°48′17.97″W

Playing kits
Home Kit	Change Kit

Senior Club Championships
	All Ireland	Ulster champions	Derry champions
Football:	-	-	4
Hurling:	-	-	3

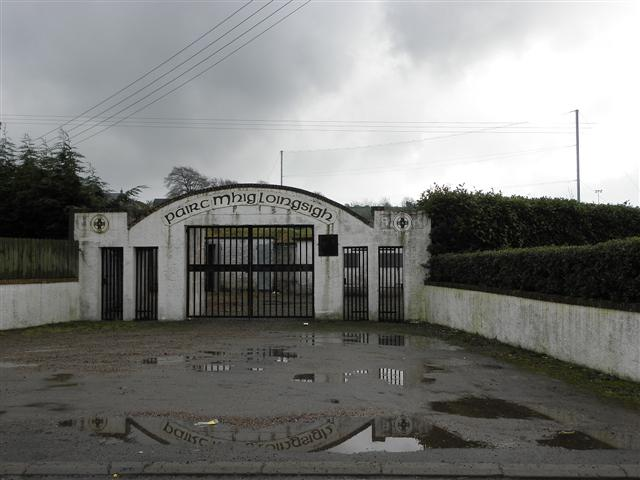
Páirc Mhig Loingsigh

St Colm's Ballinascreen GAC (Irish: CLG Naomh Colm Baile na Scrine) is a Gaelic Athletic Association club based in Ballinascreen, which includes the town of Draperstown, County Londonderry, Northern Ireland. The club is a member of the Derry GAA. It currently caters for Gaelic football, hurling, camogie and ladies' Gaelic football and have 25 teams across the four sports.

Underage teams up to U-12's play in the south Derry GAA league and championships, from U-14 upwards teams compete in All-Derry competitions.

== History ==
St Colm's GAC Ballinascreen was founded in 1933. The founders were Seán Mac Diarmada, James Conway, Barney Rodgers and Eddie O'Neill and Michael Kelly. St Colm's started off impressively by winning their first two Derry Senior Football Championships in 1934 and 1935. They followed this with two Derry Senior Hurling Championships in 1938 and 1939. They added a third football championship in 1941. Matt Regan played in all five championship successes. He was a regular on the Derry county team and was the first Derry man to play for Ulster in the Railway Cup.

Ballinascreen opened Dean McGlinchey Park in 1954. A covered stand was added in 1970. They won the 1954 Derry Junior Football Championship. The club won a further Senior Football Championship in 1973, beating Bellaghy in the final.

St Colm's have won eight Ulster Scór titles and one All-Ireland title, the best performance of any club in the county.

In the centenary year for Derry (1984), St. Colm's won the Og Sport award and the AIB Club of the Year award.

== Football ==
Ballinascreen have played senior football for the majority of their existence in Derry. In 2007 the club was relegated to Division Two, though they still played in the senior championship. In the following season, the club won promotion back to Division One by winning the Division Two league title. The club have won four Derry Senior Football Championships, with their last title coming in 1973. For a number of years Ballinascreen also competed in the pre-season Ulster League competition, winning the cup in 2009 and 2022. Ballinascreen have won 9 Minor titles (second on the list behind Bellaghy), with the last coming in 2017. That year they also made it to the Ulster Minor Club Final.

== Hurling ==
Ballinascreen have claimed the Derry Senior Hurling Championship on three occasions (1887, 1938 and 1939).

Ballinascreen have won the hurling league in 2005 and played in a county hurling final in 2003.

== Dean McGlinchey Park ==
The club's home ground is Dean McGlinchey Park. It has also hosted Derry inter-county games since the 1950s. Since the 1990s Celtic Park in Derry City has become officially recognised as Derry's main county ground, but Dean McGlinchey Park has still hosted a number of National League and Dr. McKenna Cup games in recent years.

In the last 30 years many improvements have been made to the club grounds, including: a club house, full sized floodlit pitch (named after former Chairman, James McNally) and most recently a fully equipped gym.

== Honours ==
Amongst Ballinascreen's honours, they have won the Derry Senior Club Football Championship four times (1934, 1935, 1941 and 1973). They won 2 provincial titles by winning the Ulster League in 2009 and 2022. They have claimed the Derry Senior Club Hurling Championship on three occasions (1887, 1938 and 1939). U-16 Derry County Champions 2006 Minor Derry football County Champions 2005 Minor County hurling champions 1989, 1995, 2007, 2008 and 2009 Ulster Minor Hurling Champions 2008 and 2009 All Ireland Feile Na nGael Winners 1996, 2003, 2004,

=== Gaelic football ===
==== Senior ====
- Ulster Leagues: 2
  - 2009, 2022
- Derry Senior Football Championships: 4
  - 1934, 1935, 1941, 1973
- Derry Senior Football League Div 1: 3
  - 1972, 1994, 2011
- Derry Senior Football League Div 2: 1
  - 2008
- Derry Intermediate Football Championships: 1
  - 1973 (won by Ballinascreen Thirds)
- Derry Junior Football Championships: 3
  - 1954, 1984, 1989
- Derry Junior Football Leagues: 3
  - 1977, 1979 (Ballinascreen B), 1991 (won by Ballinascreen Thirds)
- McGlinchey Cup 1
  - 2005

==== Reserves ====
- Derry Reserve Football Championships: 1
  - 2000.

==== Minor ====
- Derry Minor Football Championships: 9
  - 1958, 1960, 1964, 1966, 1967, 1968, 1978, 2005, 2017

=== Hurling ===
==== Senior ====
- Derry Senior Hurling Championship 3
  - 1887, 1938, 1939
- Derry Senior Hurling League Div 1 2
  - 1989, 2005
- Ulster Junior Club Hurling Championship 1
  - 2024

==== Reserves ====
- Derry Reserve Hurling Championship 4
  - 2004, 2005, 2009, 2018
- Derry Senior Hurling League Div 1 Winners 1
  - 2014
- Derry Senior Hurling League Div 2 Winners 3
  - 2003, 2005, 2008

==== Minor ====
- Ulster Minor Club Hurling Championships: 2
  - 2008, 2009
- Derry County Championships: 8
  - 1986, 1987, 1989, 1995, 2007, 2008, 2009,2020
- Derry Minor Hurling league 11
  - 1983, 1985, 1986, 1989, 1992, 1995, 2004, 2005, 2007, 2008, 2009
- South Derry Championship 10
  - 1981, 1983, 1985, 1986, 1987, 1989, 1991, 1992, 1995 1998

=== Camogie ===
==== Under-16 ====
- U16 Camogie Derry Championships: 1
  - 2020

=== Ladies Football ===
==== Senior ====
Derry Senior Championship 2018, 2019

== Notable players ==
- Tony Scullion - 1 All-Ireland Senior Football Championship (1993) 2 Ulster Senior Football Championships (1987 1993) 3 National Football Leagues (1992 1995 1996—Captain 1995) 6 Railway cup medals playing for Ulster (1989 1991 1992 1993 1994 1995—Captain 1991) Played for Ireland in 2 International Rules Series V Australia (1987 & 1990) 4 All-Star Awards (1987 1992 1993 1995)
- Éamonn Burns - 1 All-Ireland Senior Football Championship 1993, 2 Ulster Senior Football Championships, 1 All-Ireland Minor Football Championship, 4 National Football Leagues.

== See also ==
- Derry Senior Football Championship
- Derry Senior Hurling Championship
- List of Gaelic games clubs in Derry
