= Slaughtneil GAC =

Derry-based Gaelic games club

Robert Emmet's GAC Slaughtneil
- CLG Roibeard Éiméid Sleacht Néill
- Founded: 1953
- County: Derry
- Nickname: The Robbies; Na hEiméid
- Colours: Maroon and white
- Grounds: Emmet Park
- Coordinates: 54°53′01″N 6°42′02″W

Playing kits
Football	Hurling

Senior Club Championships
	All Ireland	Ulster champions	Derry champions
Football:	-	3	6
Hurling:	-	6	20
Camogie:	3	6	11

Robert Emmet's Gaelic Athletic Club Slaughtneil (Irish: CLG Roibeard Éiméid Sleacht Néill) is a Gaelic Athletic Association club based on the townland of Slaughtneil, near Maghera, County Londonderry, Northern Ireland. The club is a member of Derry GAA and competes in Gaelic football, hurling and camogie. The club is named after Irish patriot and revolutionary Robert Emmet and the club plays its home games at Emmet Park.

Slaughtneil have won the Derry Senior Football Championship six times and the Derry Senior Hurling Championship 20 times. Slaughtneil also won their first Derry senior camogie championship in 2012, and has since won three All-Ireland Senior Club Camogie Championship titles and 11 Derry titles. Slaughtneil won "Club of the Year" at the 2000 Ulster GAA Writer's Association Awards.

== Codes ==
The club fields teams in several GAA codes, including hurling, Gaelic football and camogie, with teams in each code winning multiple county and provincial titles between 2013 and 2021.

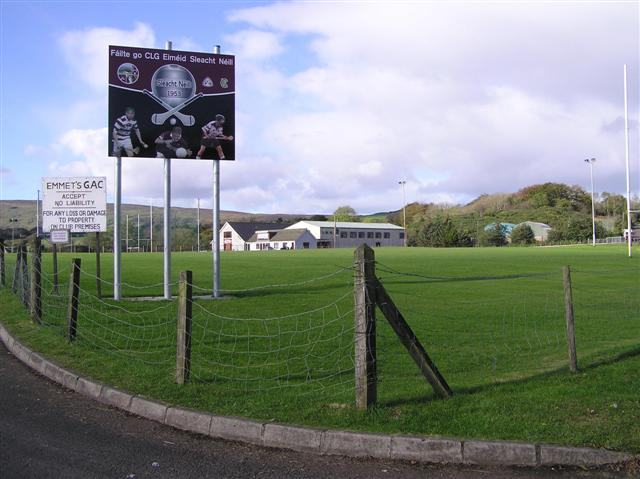
Club grounds (2007)

=== Hurling ===
Slaughtneil is one of the most successful clubs in the Derry Senior Hurling Championship, having won 20 county titles, including 14 successive titles between 2013 and 2026.

Slaughtneil are the only Derry team to have ever won the Ulster Senior Club Hurling Championship lifting the Four Seasons Cup in 2016, 2017, 2019, 2021, 2024 and 2025.

=== Gaelic football ===
As of October 2020, the club had won six Senior County Championship titles. The first of these came in 2004, when Slaughtneil defeated Bellaghy at Watty Graham Park, Maghera. Slaughtneil won their second Derry title in 2014 and their third in 2015. On 30 November 2014, Slaughtneil beat Omagh St Enda's to claim their first Ulster Club Championship. The club went on to win additional Ulster club titles in 2016 and 2017.

=== Camogie ===
Slaughtneil fields camogie teams at U6, U10, U12, U14, U16, Minor, and Senior levels. Slaughtneil won the Senior Camogie Championship in 2012 and 2015 and the Derry League in both years. In 2014 and 2015 they won the Ulster League. In 2023, Slaughtneil's camogie team won its ninth consecutive Derry senior camogie title.

In 2017 they won the All-Ireland Senior Club Camogie Championship, and retained this title in 2018 and 2019.

== Honours ==
=== Senior football ===
- Ulster Senior Club Football Championship (3): 2014, 2016 2017
- Derry Senior Football Championship (6): 2004, 2014, 2015, 2016, 2017, 2020.
- Derry Senior Football League (3): 2001, 2013, 2018
- Derry Intermediate Football Championship (1): 1982
- Derry Intermediate Football League (1): 1982
- Derry Junior Football Championship (1): 1956
- Larkin Cup (2): 2003, 2013
- McGlinchey Cup (3): 1999, 2001, 2006

=== Senior hurling ===
- Ulster Senior Club Hurling Championship (6): 2016, 2017, 2019, 2021, 2024, 2025
- Derry Senior Hurling Championship (20): 1965, 1966, 1968, 1969, 1993, 2000, 2013, 2014, 2015, 2016, 2017 2018, 2019, 2020, 2021, 2022, 2023, 2024, 2025, 2026

=== Senior camogie ===
- All-Ireland Senior Club Camogie Championship (3): 2017, 2018, 2019 (Runners-up 2020)
- Ulster Senior Club Camogie Championship (6): 2016, 2017, 2018, 2019, 2020, 2021
- Derry Senior Camogie Championship (11): 2012, 2015, 2016, 2017, 2018, 2019, 2020, 2021, 2022, 2023, 2025

== Notable players ==
- Patsy Bradley – Former Derry player. Part of Derry's 2002 All-Ireland Minor Football Championship winning side.
- Francis McEldowney – dual player
- Chrissy McKaigue – Derry footballer and dual club player
- Cormac O'Doherty – Derry U-21 hurler and dual club player
- Brendan Rogers – Derry footballer and dual club player
- Shane McGuigan (Gaelic footballer) - Derry footballer and dual club player 2023 football All-star

== See also ==
- List of Gaelic games clubs in Derry
