= Na Magha CLG =

Derry-based Gaelic games club

- Founded: 1982
- County: Derry
- Colours: Green, White, and black
- Grounds: Amelia Earhart Centre, Ballyarnet
- Coordinates: 55°02′01.69″N 7°17′59.54″W

Playing kits
Home colours

Na Magha CLG is a Gaelic Athletic Association club based in Derry, Northern Ireland. The club is a member of the Derry GAA and caters for camogie and hurling teams from U5 (Campa Éamoin)to senior level. They are the only hurling and camogie teams in Derry City.

== See also ==
- List of Gaelic games clubs in Derry
