= Banagher GAC =

Derry-based Gaelic games club

St Mary's Banagher GAC
- CLG Naomh Mhuire Beannchar
- Founded: 1965
- County: Derry
- Colours: Maroon and white
- Grounds: Fr. McNally Park
- Coordinates: 54°53′31.24″N 7°00′49.87″W

Playing kits
Standard colours

Senior Club Championships
	All Ireland	Ulster champions	Derry champions
Hurling:	-	-	3

St Mary's Banagher GAC (Irish: CLG Naomh Mhuire Beannchar) is a Gaelic Athletic Association club based in the Feeny / Park area of County Londonderry, Northern Ireland. The club is a member of the Derry GAA. Banagher is a dual club and currently caters for Gaelic football, hurling and camogie. The club motto is the Irish Ní neart go misneach, which translates as "No strength like courage".

Underage teams up to U-12s play in North Derry league and championships, from U-14 upwards teams compete in All-Derry competitions. The club was formed in 1965, when St Mary's Park and St Joseph's Banagher amalgamated.

The club have won the Derry Senior Hurling Championship on three occasions and have been runners up three times in the Derry Senior Football Championship

== History ==
Up until 1965, St Mary's Park and St Joseph's Banagher were the two teams in the area. Fr. McNally went about reviving Gaelic football in the area by creating a new team to cover both Feeny and Park. The name was chosen as a compromise between the two old clubs and the maroon and white colours were chosen in recognition of the Galway team who were All-Ireland Champions at the time.

The stag depicted on the crest represents the legend that Saint Muireach O'Heaney (a local Saint) followed a stag to the site where he founded his church, the present day ruins of Banagher Old Church. The mythical beast to the right is a "peiste", which St Muireach is said to have banished into a deep pool in Banagher Glen known as "Lig na Peiste" (pit of the serpent). The mountains at the top of the crest are the Sperrins, which surround Banagher. The current manager for football is Eamon Lynch.

== Players ==
- Seán Marty Lockhart – All Star-winning Derry footballer
- Darragh McCloskey – Derry hurler
- Mark Lynch – Former Derry football captain

== Gaelic football titles ==
=== Senior ===
- Derry Intermediate Football League: 4
  - 1970, 1972, 1996, 2002
- Dr Kerlin Cup 9
  - 1976, 1978, 1979, 1980, 1981, 1984, 1987, 1995, 1996, 2016

=== U-21 ===
- North Derry U-21 Football Championship: 1
  - 2006

=== Minor ===
- Derry Minor Football Championship: 3
  - 1952, 1969, 1976
- North Derry Minor Football Championship: 3
  - 1968, 1970, 1998
- North Derry Minor Football League: 1
  - 2002
- Carlin/Duffy Cup 2
  - 2002, 2008

== Hurling titles ==
=== Senior ===
- Derry Senior Hurling Championship: 3
  - 1978, 1980, 2005
- Derry Senior Hurling League: 2
  - 1999, 2001
- Derry Intermediate Hurling Championship: 4
  - 1989, 1991, 1994, 2021
- Ulster Intermediate Club Hurling Championship: 1
  - 2021

=== Under-21 ===
- Derry Under-21 Hurling Championship:1
  - 2007

=== Minor ===
- Derry Minor Hurling Championship: 6
  - 1977, 1992, 1993, 1994, 2002, 2003

== See also ==
- Derry Senior Football Championship
- Derry Senior Hurling Championship
- List of Gaelic games clubs in Derry
