= 2026 Derry Senior Football Championship =

Gaelic football competition

Tournament details
- County: Derry
- Year: 2026
- Trophy: John McLaughlin Cup
- Date: 27 August – 25 October 2026
- Teams: 16
- Defending champions: Newbridge

Winners
- Champions: Magherafelt
- Manager: Enda Muldoon
- Captain: Conor McCluskey

Runners-up
- Runners-up: Newbridge
- Manager: Gary Hetherington; Kevin Brady

Promotion/Relegation
- Relegated team(s): Faughanvale

Other
- Website: Derry GAA

The 2026 Derry Senior Football Championship is the 105th edition of Derry GAA's premier gaelic football tournament for the top clubs. The sixteen teams who qualified for the 2026 senior championship (15 Senior League teams and 1 Intermediate League team) are explained in the 'Competition Format' section below.

Newbridge are the defending champions after winning their 11th Derry SFC title against Magherafelt.

The draw for round 1 of the championship was made on 22 July 2026.

== Competition Format ==
The 2026 Senior Championship format is the same as it was in the 2025 Senior Championship. The format is as follows:

- Round 1 - Open Draw: 8 vs 8
  - Round 2A - Round 1 Winner vs Round 1 Winner (Open Draw)
    - Winners of Round 2A straight into quarter final (Pot 1)
  - Round 2B - Round 1 Loser vs Round 1 Loser (Open Draw)
    - Losers of Round 2B into Relegation Playoff Semi Final (Open Draw)
- Round 3 - Round 2A losers v Round 2B Winners (Pot 2)
- Quarter Final - Pot 1 v Pot 2
- Semi Final - Open Draw
- Final

== Team Changes ==
The following teams have changed division since the 2025 championship season:

=== To S.F.C. ===
Promoted from 2025 Derry I.F.C.

- Glenullin - (Intermediate Champions)

=== From S.F.C ===
Relegated from 2025 Derry S.F.C.

- Drumsurn

== Participating Teams ==
The clubs competing in the 2026 Derry S.F.C. are:

Club	Location	Manager(s)	2025 Championship Position	2026 Championship Position	League	Championship Titles (Pre 2026)	Last Championship Title (Pre 2026)
Ballinascreen	Ballinascreen		Relegation Playoff	Relegation Semi-Finalist	Senior League	4	1973
Ballinderry	Ballinderry		Relegation Playoff	Quarter-Finalist	Senior League	13	2013
Banagher	Feeny / Park Area		Quarter-Finalist	Relegation Semi-Finalist	Intermediate League	0	—
Bellaghy	Bellaghy		Quarter-Finalist	Quarter-Finalist	Senior League	21	2005
Dungiven	Dungiven		Round 3	Round 3	Senior League	7	1997
Faughanvale	Greysteel		Round 3	Relegated to Intermediate	Senior League	0	—
Glen	Maghera		Semi-Finalist	Semi-Finalist	Senior League	3	2023
Glenullin	Termonfeckin		I.F.C Champions	Round 3	Senior League	3	2007
Kilrea	Kilrea		Round 3	Quarter-Finalist	Senior League	0	—
Lavey	Lavey		Quarter-Finalist	Quarter-Finalist	Senior League	9	1993
Loup	The Loup		Round 3	Relegation Finalist	Senior League	0	—
Magherafelt	Magherafelt		Runners-Up	Champions	Senior League	6	2019
Newbridge	Newbridge		Champions	Runners-Up	Senior League	12	2025
Slaughtneil	Slaughtneil		Semi-Finalist	Semi-Finalist	Senior League	6	2020
Steelstown	Derry		Quarter-Finalist	Round 3	Senior League	0	—
Swatragh	Swatragh		Relegation Playoff	Round 3	Senior League	0	—

== Round 1-3 ==
=== Round 1 ===
Draw for round 1 of the championship was made on 22 July 2026.

27 August 2026 Round 1	Faughanvale	1-08 (11) – (27) 2-21	Lavey	Owenbeg
19:30 IST (UTC+1)				Venue: Owenbeg Derry GAA Centre
		Report

28 August 2026 Round 1	Kilrea	1-10 (13) – (17) 0-17	Newbridge	Owenbeg
19:00 IST (UTC+1)		(HT: 1-05 – 0-07)		Venue: Owenbeg Derry GAA Centre
	Pts: Larry Kielt 0-4 (1tp, 1f), Rory Maguire 1-0, Conor Gillen 0-2 (tpf), Daniel Madden 0-2 (tp), Gearoid McLaughlin 0-1, Kevin Quinn 0-1	Report	Pts: Oisín Doherty 0-10 (3tpf, 3f), Conor McAteer 0-2, Eamon Young 0-2 (1f), Padraig McGrogan 0-1, Conor McGrogan 0-1, Dylan McAreavy 0-1

29 August 2026 Round 1	Glenullin	2-16 (22) – (19) 1-16	Loup	Owenbeg
16:30 IST (UTC+1)		(HT: 0-04 – 1-08)		Venue: Owenbeg Derry GAA Centre
	Pts: Conrad Mullan 1-3 (1tpf, 1f), Ryan McNicholl 1-2, Donal O'Kane 0-3, Neil McNicholl 0-3 (1tpf, 1f), Ronan Close 0-2, Conor Rafferty 0-1, Dultach O'Kane 0-1, Cillian Bradley 0-1	Report	Pts: Caolan Devlin 0-4 (1f), Nicholas Cleary 1-1, Thomas Mallon 0-2 (tpf), Ciarán Devlin 0-2 (1f), Dylan Rocks 0-2, Cody Rocks 0-1, Matthew Rocks 0-1, Seán Rocks 0-1, Peter Coleman 0-1, Anthony O'Neill 0-1

29 August 2026 Round 1	Steelstown	4-13 (25) – (14) 0-14	Swatragh	Owenbeg
18:15 IST (UTC+1)		(HT: 3-08 – 0-06)		Venue: Owenbeg Derry GAA Centre
	Pts: Cahir McMonagle 3-6 (1tpf, 2f), Callum Deery 1-1, Ben McCarron 0-3, Neil Forester 0-1, Donnacha Gilmore 0-1, Odhran Campbell 0-1	Report	Pts: Seán Kearney 0-7 (1tp, 5f), Conor McAtamney 0-3 (1tp), Francis Kearney 0-1, Brendan Bradley 0-1, Fintan McGurk 0-1, Daire Ó Lochlainn 0-1

30 August 2026 Round 1	Bellaghy	1-21 (24) – (14) 2-08	Dungiven	Owenbeg
12:00 IST (UTC+1)				Venue: Owenbeg Derry GAA Centre

30 August 2026 Round 1	Glen	2-20 (26) – (19) 4-07	Banagher	Owenbeg
13:45 IST (UTC+1)		(HT: 0-11 – 2-02)		Venue: Owenbeg Derry GAA Centre
	Pts: Alex Doherty 1-5, Emmett Bradley 0-4, Jack Doherty 1-0, Danny Tallon 0-3 (2f), Conor Glass 0-2, Conlon McGuckin 0-1, Sé Molloy 0-1 (f), Johnny McGuckin 0-1, Ciarán McFaul 0-1, Michael Warnock 0-1	Report	Pts: Tiarnan Moore 2-3 (1tp), Ruairí Biggs 1-1, Gavin O'Neill 0-2 (tp), Emmett Óg Feeney 0-1, Fionn Cartin 0-1

30 August 2026 Round 1	Slaughtneil	1-15 (18) – (27) 2-21	Magherafelt	Owenbeg
18:00 IST (UTC+1)				Venue: Owenbeg Derry GAA Centre
	Pts: Shane McGuigan 1-4 (1f, 1tp), Brendan Rogers 0-4 (2tp), Ciarán McEldowney 0-3 (1f, 1tp), Padraig Cassidy 0-2, Christopher Bradley 0-1 (f), Conor Coyle 0-1	Report	Pts: Shea McGuckin 0-6 (2f, 1tp), Paddy McLarnon 0-4 (1tp), Cormac Murphy 1-1, Johnny McErlaine 1-0, Eoin McEvoy 0-3, Conall Higgins 0-2, Dan Higgins 0-2 (tp), Rory Small 0-2

4 September 2026 Round 1	Ballinderry	2-17 (23) – (19) 2-13	Ballinascreen	Owenbeg
19:30 IST (UTC+1)				Venue: Owenbeg Derry GAA Centre
		Report

=== Round 2 ===
Draw for round 2 of the championship was made on 30 August 2026.

==== Round 2A ====
5 September 2026 Round 2A	Lavey	2-15 (21) – (23) 1-20	Newbridge	Owenbeg
18:00 IST (UTC+1)		(HT: 1-05 – 1-12)		Venue: Owenbeg Derry GAA Centre
	Pts: Matthew Downey 1-3 (1f, 1tp), Dara O'Kane 1-0, Conor Downey 0-4 (2tp), James Sargent 0-3 (1tp), Ciarán Hendry 0-3 (1tp), Brian Mulholland 0-1, Rory McGill 0-1 (f)	Report	Pts: Oisín Doherty 0-11 (3tp), Conor McAteer 0-4, Shea McAteer 1-0, Eamon Young 0-2 (tp), Conor Doherty 0-1, Dylan McGreevy 0-1, Aidan McGlone 0-1

6 September 2026 Round 2A	Steelstown	1-10 (13) – (19) 3-10	Magherafelt	Owenbeg
16:00 IST (UTC+1)		(HT: 1-02 – 2-04)		Venue: Owenbeg Derry GAA Centre
	Pts: Cahir McMonagle 1-6 (2f, 2tp, 1pen), Ryan Devine 0-3 (1tp), Callum Deery 0-1	Report	Pts: Conall Higgins 1-4 (3f), Aidan McCluskey 2-0, Shea McGuckin 0-2, Rory Small 0-1, Dan Higgins 0-1, Eoin McEvoy 0-1, Cormac Murphy 0-1

6 September 2026 Round 2A	Bellaghy	0-11 (11) – (29) 3-20	Glen	Owenbeg
18:00 IST (UTC+1)		(HT: 0-08 – 1-07)		Venue: Owenbeg Derry GAA Centre
	Pts: Damon Gallagher 0-4 (1tp), 2f), Luke Diamond 0-2 (tp), Charlie Diamond 0-2 (tp), Declan Cassidy 0-2 (tp), Dara Doherty 0-1	Report	Pts: Alex Doherty 3-6 (2f, 1tp), Ethan Doherty 0-3, Danny Tallon 0-3 (1tp), Johnny McGuckian 0-1, Jack Doherty 0-1, Conor Glass 0-1, Odhran Molloy 0-1, Dara McGill 0-1, Conleth McGuckian 0-1, Ciarán McFaul 0-1, Jody McDermott 0-1

9 September 2026 Round 2A	Glenullin	2-13 (19) – (22) 1-19	Ballinderry	Owenbeg
19:30 IST (UTC+1)				Venue: Owenbeg Derry GAA Centre

==== Round 2B ====
3 September 2026 Round 2B	Kilrea	3-14 (23) – (9) 1-06	Faughanvale	Owenbeg
20:00 IST (UTC+1)		(HT: 2-06 – 1-04)		Venue: Owenbeg Derry GAA Centre
	Pts: Tommy Rogers 1-5 (1tp), Rory Maguire 2-0, James Kielt 0-3 (1tp, 1f), PJ McAleese 0-3, Conor Gillen 0-2 (2f), Cathaoir Bradley 0-1	Report	Pts: Eoin McElhinney 1-2 (1pen, 1f), Jude Bryson 0-2, Conlaodh McGee 0-1, Shane McGlinchey 0-1

5 September 2026 Round 2B	Swatragh	1-12 (15) – (11) 0-11	Loup	Owenbeg
16:15 IST (UTC+1)		(HT: 0-04 – 0-04)		Venue: Owenbeg Derry GAA Centre
	Pts: James Kearney 1-1, Francis Kearney 0-4 (1tp, 1'45), Seán Kearney 0-2, Brendan Bradley 0-1, Fintan McGurk 0-1, Conor McAtameney 0-1	Report	Pts: Caolan Devlin 0-7 (5f), Peter Coleman 0-1, Adam Cananan 0-1, Dylan Rocks 0-1

6 September 2026 Round 2B	Banagher	2-17 (23) – (34) 6-16	Slaughtneil	Owenbeg
14:15 IST (UTC+1)		(HT: 0-12 – 1-07)		Venue: Owenbeg Derry GAA Centre
	Pts: Tiernan Moore 1-6 (2f), Eamon Óg Feeney 0-3, Ciarán Lynch 1-0 (pen), Ruairí Biggs 0-2 (tp), Gavin O'Neill 0-2 (tp), Peter Hagan 0-2 (1f), Callum Armstrong 0-2 (tpf)	Report	Pts: Shane McGuigan 4-6 (2pen, 1tp), Christopher Bradley 1-4 (2f), Paul McNeil 1-0, Brendan Rogers 0-2 (tp), Se McGuigan 0-2 (tp), Conor Coyle 0-1, Shea Cassidy 0-1

9 September 2026 Round 2B	Dungiven	2-14 (20) – (16) 1-13	Ballinascreen	Derry
19:30 IST (UTC+1)				Venue: Celtic Park
		Report

=== Round 3 ===
Draw for round 3 of the championship was made on 9 September 2026.

24 September 2026 Round 3	Steelstown	0-09 (9) – (15) 1-12	Kilrea	Owenbeg
19:30 IST (UTC+1)				Venue: Owenbeg Derry GAA Centre

26 September 2026 Round 3	Lavey	1-14 (17) – (13) 1-10	Swatragh	Owenbeg
18:00 IST (UTC+1)				Venue: Owenbeg Derry GAA Centre

27 September 2026 Round 3	Glenullin	2-09 (15) – (33) 3-24	Slaughtneil	Owenbeg
16:00 IST (UTC+1)				Venue: Owenbeg Derry GAA Centre

27 September 2026 Round 3	Bellaghy	1-16 (19) – (15) 1-12	Dungiven	Owenbeg
18:00 IST (UTC+1)				Venue: Owenbeg Derry GAA Centre

== Relegation Playoffs ==
=== Relegation Semi-Finals ===
Draw for the relegation semi-finals was made on 9 September 2026.

26 September 2026 Relegation Semi-Final	Ballinascreen	2-17 (23) – (22) 1-19	Loup	Owenbeg
16:00 IST (UTC+1)				Venue: Owenbeg Derry GAA Centre

27 September 2026 Relegation Semi-Final	Faughanvale	3-24 (33) – (37) 2-31 (a.e.t.)	Banagher	Derry
14:00 IST (UTC+1)				Venue: Celtic Park

=== Relegation Final ===
2 October 2026 Relegation Final	Loup	1-16 (19) – (10) 1-07	Faughanvale	Owenbeg
19:30 IST (UTC+1)				Venue: Owenbeg Derry GAA Centre

== Knockout Stage ==
=== Bracket ===
Quarter-finals
3 October, Owenbeg
Glen	1-16
Kilrea	1-06
4 October, Owenbeg
Newbridge	2-12
Bellaghy	0-16
3 October, Owenbeg
Magherafelt	1-15
Lavey	1-13
4 October, Owenbeg
Ballinderry	0-11
Slaughtneil	2-17

Semi-finals
11 October, Owenbeg
Glen	1-10
Newbridge	2-16
10 October, Owenbeg
Magherafelt	0-14
Slaughtneil	1-06

Final
25 October, Derry
Newbridge	0-20
Magherafelt	3-17

=== Quarter-Finals ===
3 October 2026 Quarter-Final	Glen	1-16 (19) – (9) 1-06	Kilrea	Owenbeg
16:00 IST (UTC+1)		(HT: 0-09 – 0-05)		Venue: Owenbeg Derry GAA Centre
	Pts: Alex Doherty 1-5 (1tp, 1f), Emmett Bradley 0-3 (1f), Conleth McGuckian 0-2, Jack Doherty 0-2, Conor Convery 0-1, Conor Glass 0-1, Johnny McGuckian 0-1, Paul Gunning 0-1 (f)	Report	Pts: James Kielt 0-3 (1tp, 1f), Tommy Rogers 0-2, Daniel Madden 0-1

3 October 2026 Quarter-Final	Magherafelt	1-15 (18) – (16) 1-13	Lavey	Owenbeg
18:00 IST (UTC+1)		(HT: 0-07 – 0-07)		Venue: Owenbeg Derry GAA Centre
	Pts: Conall Higgins 0-4 (1tp), Cahir Quinn 1-0, Paddy McLarnon 0-3, Eoin McEvoy 0-3 (1tp), Shane Heavron 0-3 (1f), Cahir Spiers 0-1, Aidan McCloskey 0-1	Report	Pts: Conor Mulholland 1-0, James Sargent 0-3 (1tp), Niall Toner 0-2, Patrick McGuirk 0-2, Ryan Mulholland 0-2 (tp), Ciarán Hendry 0-1, James McGuirk 0-1, Conor Downey 0-1, Matthew Downey 0-1 (f)

4 October 2026 Quarter-Final	Ballinderry	0-11 (11) – (23) 2-17	Slaughtneil	Owenbeg
16:00 IST (UTC+1)		(HT: 0-05 – 1-06)		Venue: Owenbeg Derry GAA Centre
	Pts: Ryan Bell 0-3 (1tp), Gareth McKinless 0-3, Niall O'Donnell 0-1, Shea McCann 0-1, Ruairí Forbes 0-1, Dara McGuckin 0-1, Cohen Cassidy 0-1	Report	Pts: Shane McGuigan 0-5 (2tp), Brendan Rogers 1-2 (1tp), Shea Cassidy 0-4, Eamonn Cassidy 1-0, Cormac O'Doherty 0-2, Padraig Cassidy 0-1, Sé McGuigan 0-1, Eoin Mulholland 0-1, Christopher Bradley 0-1 (f)

4 October 2026 Quarter-Final	Newbridge	2-12 (18) – (16) 0-16	Bellaghy	Owenbeg
18:00 IST (UTC+1)		(HT: 1-07 – 0-04)		Venue: Owenbeg Derry GAA Centre
	Pts: Oisín Doherty 1-4 (2f), Conleth McGrogan 1-0, Eamon Young 0-2 (tp), Conor McAteer 0-2, Mark Doherty 0-1, Shea McAteer 0-1, Dylan McGreevy 0-1, Cathair McBride 0-1	Report	Pts: Charlie Diamond 0-4 (2tp), Damon Gallagher 0-4 (1f, 1tp), Paul Cassidy 0-2, Declan Cassidy 0-2 (tp), Peter Stuart 0-1 ('45), James Donnelly 0-1, Oisín McErlean 0-1, Eoghan Brown 0-1

=== Semi-Finals ===
10 October 2026 Semi-Final	Magherafelt	0-14 (14) – (9) 1-06	Slaughtneil	Owenbeg
18:00 IST (UTC+1)		(HT: 0-08 – 0-01)		Venue: Owenbeg Derry GAA Centre
	Pts: Conall Higgins 0-7 (3f), Cormac Murphy 0-3, Eoin McEvoy 0-2, Cahir Spiers 0-1, Shane Heavron 0-1	Report	Pts: Shane McGuigan 1-2 (2f), Brendan Rogers 0-4 (2tp)

11 October 2026 Semi-Final	Newbridge	2-16 (22) – (13) 1-10	Glen	Owenbeg
16:00 IST (UTC+1)		(HT: 0-10 – 0-05)		Venue: Owenbeg Derry GAA Centre
	Pts: Conor McAteer 1-4 (2tp), Padraig McGrogan 1-1, Oisín Doherty 0-4 (1tp, 2f), Seán Young 0-3 (1tp), Conor Doherty 0-2, Eamon Young 0-1	Report	Pts: Danny Tallon 0-4 (2tp), Paul Gunning 1-0, Ciarán McFaul 0-2, Conleth McGuckian 0-1, Johnny McGuckian 0-1, Alex Doherty 0-1, Conor Glass 0-1 ('45)

=== Final ===
25 October 2026 Final	Magherafelt	3-17 (26) – (20) 0-20	Newbridge	Derry
15:30 GMT (UTC+0)		(HT: 0-13 – 0-07)		Venue: Celtic Park
	Pts: Conall Higgins 0-9 (3tp, 1'45), Aidan McCluskey 1-1, Johnny McErlain 1-0, Cormac Murphy 1-0, Shea Heavron 0-3 (2f), Eoin McEvoy 0-3, Cahir Spiers 0-1	Report	Pts: Oisín Doherty 0-12 (4f, 1tpf), Conor McAteer 0-3 (1tp), Conor Doherty 0-3 (1tp), Shea McAteer 0-1, Conleth McGrogan 0-1
