= Dermot Heaney =

Derry Gaelic footballer

Personal information
- Born: 27 July 1971 (age 55) County Londonderry, Northern Ireland
- Occupation: Personnel Manager
- Height: 6 ft 1 in (185 cm)

Sport
- Sport: Gaelic football
- Position: Half forward/Midfield
Club
Years	Club	Apps (scores)
1987–2007	Castledawson	?
Inter-county
Years	County	Apps (scores)
?–?	Derry	?
Inter-county titles
- Ulster titles: 2
- All-Irelands: 1
- NFL: 4

Dermot Heaney (born 27 July 1971) is a former Gaelic footballer who played for the Derry county team in the 1990s and early 2000s. He part of Derry's 1993 All-Ireland Championship winning side, also winning Ulster Senior Football Championships in 1993 and 1998. He usually played in the half-forward line, although sometimes played in midfield. Heaney played club football with St Malachy's GAC Castledawson.

== Playing career ==
=== Inter-county ===
Henaey as a teenager was known as a football prodigy. He played Minor football for Derry for three years from 1987 to 1989. In 1989 he was full forward on the team won the Ulster Minor Football Championship and All-Ireland Minor Championship.

He was part of Derry's National League winning team in 1992, playing in midfield. Heaney was awarded the Ulster Tennent's GAA Writers' Association Monthly Merit Award for April 1992 for his performances in the latter stages of the league. The following year he was part of Derry's Ulster Senior Championship and All-Ireland Championship winning side, playing full-forward in the Ulster final and right half forward in the All-Ireland final.

He won a further three National League medals in 1995, 1996 and 2000 and a second Ulster Senior Championship in 1998.

=== Club ===
Heaney starting playing with the Castledawson Senior team when he was 15, and reached two Derry Senior Football Championship finals (1989 and 1997) in his career, but finished on the losing side in both, to Newbridge and Dungiven respectively. Prior to this Heaney won Derry Minor 'B' Football Championship and League (11 a-side) medals. He also won the Larkin Cup with the club.

=== Province ===
Heaney was part of four Railway Cup winning Ulster sides.

=== School ===
Heaney attended St Pius X College, Magherafelt, and won two Ulster and two All-Ireland U-16 Vocational Schools Championships.

== Honours ==
=== County ===
- All-Ireland Senior Football Championship - Winner (1): 1993
- National Football League - Winner (4): 1992, 1995, 1996, 2000
- National Football League - Runner up: 1998
- Ulster Senior Football Championship - Winner (2): 1993, 1998
- Ulster Senior Football Championship - Runner up: 1992, 2000
- Dr McKenna Cup - Winner (1): 1993/1999??
- All-Ireland Minor Football Championship - Winner (1): 1989
- Ulster Minor Football Championship - Winner (1): 1989

=== Club ===
- Derry Senior Football Championship - Runner up: 1989, 1997
- Larkin Cup - Winner (1?): Year?
- Derry Minor 'B' Football Championship (11 a-side) - Winner (1): Year?
- Derry Minor 'B' Football League (11 a-side) - Winner (1): Year?
- Underage awards

=== Province ===
- Railway Cup - Winner (4): Years?

=== School ===
- All-Ireland U-16 Vocational Schools Championship - Winner (2): Years?
- Ulster U-16 Vocational Schools Championship - Winner (2): Years?

=== Individual ===
- All Star - Nominated (runner up): Year?

Note: The above lists may be incomplete. Please add any other honours you know of.
