= 2017 Derry Senior Football Championship =

Gaelic football competition

Derry SFC
- Season: 2017
- Champions: Slaughtneil (5th SFC Title)
- Winning Captain: Patsy Bradley
- Man Of The Match: Shane McGuigan
- Winning Manager: Mickey Moran

The 2017 Derry Senior Football Championship was the 94th edition of Derry GAA's premier gaelic football tournament for senior clubs in Derry Football League Division 1. The winners received the John McLaughlin Cup.

Slaughtneil were the defending champions, having won their third title in-a row by beating The Loup in the 2016 final by 2-11 to 0-6. On 24 September 2017 they won "4-in-a-row" by defeating Ballinascreen 4-12 to 1-11 in the final in Celtic Park.

== Format ==
Current format

The senior championship reverted to a straight knock out in 2016 and continues with minor alterations. At the end of each round, a draw was held to determine the fixtures in the next round.

In Derry, relegation or promotion within the league system determines which championship clubs compete in – Division 1 teams compete in the senior championship, Division 2 teams in the intermediate championship and Division 3 teams in the junior championship.

Previous Formats

A back-door format was used from 2009 to 2015. Four initial ‘round-robin’ groups progressing to an eight team straight knockout were used in seasons 2007 and 2008.

== Recent history of relegations and promotions ==
=== Relegations and promotions in 2017 ===
- After Division 1 football ended on 6 August 2017, Swatragh were 15th in the table with eight points and Banagher were 16th with six points. Swatragh were initially penalised three league points for not fielding against Coleraine which would have meant that Swatragh were relegated. The three point penalty was subsequently overturned and Banagher were relegated.
- Newbridge won Division 2 in 2017 and were promoted to Division 1 and the 2018 senior championship.

=== Relegations and promotions in 2016 ===
- Newbridge finished bottom (i.e. 16th) in Division 1 in 2016 and were relegated to Division 2.
- Glenullin won Division 2 in 2016 and were promoted to Division 1 for 2017. They applied to compete in the 2016 senior championship and were allowed to do so.

=== Relegations and promotions in 2015 ===
- Foreglen finished in the bottom two in Division 1 in 2015 and were relegated to Division 2 following their loss to Glenullin in the Division 1 relegation playoff.
- Glenullin finished in the bottom two in Division 1 in 2015 and were relegated to Division 2 following their loss to Claudy in the Division 1/Division 2 relegation/promotion playoff. Glenullin successfully applied to be allowed to play in the 2016 senior football championship.
- Greenlough won Division 2 in 2015 and were promoted to Division 1 for 2016.
- Claudy finished second in Division 2 in 2015 and were promoted to Division 1 following their victory over Glenullin in the Division 1/Division 2 relegation/promotion playoff.

== Senior Championship Draw ==
First round
Slaughtneil	2-14
Swatragh	1-11
Ballinderry	3-20
Claudy	2-7
Glen	4-11
Lavey	0-13
Kilrea	1-12
Dungiven	1-10
Ballinascreen	2-15
Bellaghy	2-8
Coleraine	2-11
Magherafelt	0-10
Greenlough	2-14
Glenullin	1-15
Banagher	1-17
The Loup	1-15

Quarter-finals
Slaughtenil	1-9
Ballinderry	0-8
Glen	2-17
Kilrea	1-13
Ballinascreen	3-7
Coleraine	0-10
Greenlough	1-15
Banagher	2-10

Semi-finals
Slaughtneil	0-13
Glen	0-6
Ballinascreen	0-11
Greenlough	0-9

Final
Slaughtneil	4-12
Ballinascreen	1-11

== First round ==
11 August 2017; 8:00 pm First round	Banagher	1-17 - 1-15	The Loup	Owenbeg; Attendance: 1,113; Referee: Barry Cassidy (Bellaghy); Man of the Match: Mark Lynch
11 August 2017; 8:00 pm First round	Peter Hagan 0-4 (0-2f), Oisin McCloskey 1-0, Mark Lynch and Steafan McCloskey 0-3 each, Tiernan Moore, Gavin O'Neill, Conor Feeney 0-2 each, Brian Óg McGilligan 0-1	Report	Anthony O'Neill 0-5 (0-3f), Declan McVey 0-4, Ciaran Devlin 1-1, Paul Young and Patrick Coney 0-2, Gavin Mallon 0-1	Owenbeg; Attendance: 1,113; Referee: Barry Cassidy (Bellaghy); Man of the Match: Mark Lynch

12 August 2017; 2:15 pm First round	Ballinascreen	2-15 - 2-8	Bellaghy	Glen; Referee: Alan Nash (Doire Trasna); Man of the Match: Benny Heron
12 August 2017; 2:15 pm First round	Benny Heron 2-3 (2-0 pen, 1 '45), Shane Mulgrew 0-5 (0-3f), Carlus McWilliams 0-3, Kieran Conway 0-1, Philip Bradley 0-1, Brendan Herron 0-1, Gary Conway 0-1,		Ruairi McElwee 2-4 (2-0 pen, 0-2f), Eoghan Brown 0-3 (0-2f), Frankie Donnelly 0-1	Glen; Referee: Alan Nash (Doire Trasna); Man of the Match: Benny Heron

12 August 2017; 6:15 pm First round	Kilrea	1-12 - 1-10	Dungiven	Owenbeg; Referee: Brendan Quinn (Ballinascreen); Man of the Match: Brian Óg McAlary
12 August 2017; 6:15 pm First round	James Kielt 0-5 (0-4f), Niall Johnston 1-0, Brian Óg McAlary 0-2, Charlie Kielt, Denver Johnston, Benny Quigg (0-1f), Paddy McNeill, Conor Gillen 0-1 each		Sean O'Kane 1-0, Kevin Johnston, Martin Burke (0-2f), Ryan McElhinney 0-2 each, James McNicholl, Seamus Higgins, Donal McGilligan, Feargal Higgins 0-1 each	Owenbeg; Referee: Brendan Quinn (Ballinascreen); Man of the Match: Brian Óg McAlary

12 August 2017; 8:00 pm First round	Glen	4-11 - 0-13	Lavey	Owenbeg; Attendance: 3,053; Referee: Peter O'Connor (Desertmatin); Man of the Match: Emmett Bradley
12 August 2017; 8:00 pm First round	Emmett Bradley 2-5 (0-4f), Conor Convery 1-1, Paul Gunning 1-0, Ciaran McFaul 0-2, Tiarnan Flanagan, Danny Tallon, Stevie O'Hara 0-1 each		Cailean O'Boyle 0-8f, Declan Hughes 0-2, Shea Downey, Chrissy Henry, Niall Toner 0-1 each	Owenbeg; Attendance: 3,053; Referee: Peter O'Connor (Desertmatin); Man of the Match: Emmett Bradley

13 August 2017; 2:15 pm First round	Greenlough	2-14 - 1-15	Glenullin	Banagher; Referee: John Joe Cleary (Castledawson); Man of the Match: Enda Lynn
13 August 2017; 2:15 pm First round	Niall Loughlin 1-4 (0-2f), Matthew Bradley 1-2, Enda Lynn 0-3, Enda McNally 0-2, Brian McCallion, Niall Bradley, Caolan Diamond 0-1 each		Neill McNicholl 0-5 (0-3f), Eoin Bradley 1-1 (1-0 pen, 0-1f), Paddy Bradley 0-3 (0-2f), Dermot O'Kane 0-2f, Chrissy Dempsey and Brian Mullan 0-1 each	Banagher; Referee: John Joe Cleary (Castledawson); Man of the Match: Enda Lynn

13 August 2017; 4:00 pm First round	Ballinderry	3-20 - 2-7	Claudy	Ballinascreen; Referee: Richie Donoghue (Slaughtneil); Man of the Match: Conleith Gilligan
13 August 2017; 4:00 pm First round	Conleith Gilligan 1-9 (0-4f), Ryan Bell 0-6, Enda Muldoon 1-1, Ryan Scott 1-0, Conor Nevin 0-2, Michael McIver and Tommy Donnelly 0-1 each		Aaron Kerrigan 2-2 (0-2f), Martin Donaghy 0-3 (0-1f), James McClay and Odhran McCloskey 0-1 each	Ballinascreen; Referee: Richie Donoghue (Slaughtneil); Man of the Match: Conleith Gilligan

13 August 2017; 6:15 pm First round	Slaughtneil	2-14 - 1-11	Swatragh	Owenbeg; Referee: Adrian McGilligan (Drumsurn); Man of the Match: Christopher Bradley
13 August 2017; 6:15 pm First round	Shane McGuigan 1-4 (0-4f), Christopher Bradley 1-4 (1-0 pen), Paul Bradley 0-4 (0-2f). Sé McGuigan and Ronan Bradley 0-1 each		Conor McAtamney 1-2 (1 ' 45), Francis Kearney 0-3 (0-2f), Ryan Dillon and Brian Diamond 0-2, Niall McAtamney and Michael Friel 0-1 each	Owenbeg; Referee: Adrian McGilligan (Drumsurn); Man of the Match: Christopher Bradley

13 August 2017; 8:00 pm First round	Coleraine Eoghan Rua	2-11 - 0-10	Magherafelt	Owenbeg; Attendance: 3,616; Referee: Daniel Mullan (Glenullin); Man of the Match: Colm McGoldrick
13 August 2017; 8:00 pm First round	Colm McGoldrick 2-3 (1-0 pen, 0-1f), Ruari Mooney and Ciaran McGoldrick 0-2 each, Ciaran Mullan, Liam McGoldrick, Ciaran Lagan, Stephen Coyles 0-1 each		Shane Heavron 0-5 (0-4f), John Young and Fionntan O'Dowd 0-2 each, Emmett McGuckin 0-1	Owenbeg; Attendance: 3,616; Referee: Daniel Mullan (Glenullin); Man of the Match: Colm McGoldrick

== Quarter-finals ==
25 August 2017; 8:15 pm Quarter-final	Greenlough	1-15 - 2-11	Banagher	Owenbeg; Attendance: 1,563; Referee: Peter O'Connor (Desertmartin); Man of the Match: Enda Lynn
25 August 2017; 8:15 pm Quarter-final	Enda Lynn 0-7 (0-2f), Niall Loughlin 1-3 (1 '45), Enda McNally and Caolan Diamond 0-2 each, Brian McCallion 0-1		Mark Lynch (0-1f) and Tiernan Moore 1-1 each, Conor Feeney 0-3, Brian Óg McGilligan and Micheal Anderson 0-2 each, Peter Hagan (0-1f) and Sean McCullagh 0-1 each	Owenbeg; Attendance: 1,563; Referee: Peter O'Connor (Desertmartin); Man of the Match: Enda Lynn

26 August 2017; 7:30 pm Quarter-final	Slaughtneil	1-9 - 0-8	Ballinderry	Owenbeg; Attendance: 3,805; Referee: John Joe Cleary (Castledawson); Man of the Match: Shane McGuigan
26 August 2017; 7:30 pm Quarter-final	Shane McGuigan 0-5 (0-1f), Sé McGuigan 1-0, Karl McKaigue, Chrissy McKaigue, Paul Bradley (0-1f), Cormac O'Doherty 0-1 each		Conleith Gilligan 0-4f, Ryan Bell 0-2 (1 '45), Enda Muldoon (1 '45) and Raymond Wilkinson 0-1 each	Owenbeg; Attendance: 3,805; Referee: John Joe Cleary (Castledawson); Man of the Match: Shane McGuigan

28 August 2017; 8:00 pm Quarter-final	Ballinascreen	3-7 - 0-10	Coleraine	Owenbeg; Referee: Damien Harkin (Slaughtmanus)
28 August 2017; 8:00 pm Quarter-final	Shane Mulgrew 1-4 (0-3f), Benny Heron 1-2 (0-1f), Gavin McWilliams o.g. 1-0, Paul Cleary 0-1	Report	Colm McGoldrick 0-5f, Gavin McWilliams 0-3 (0-2f), Sean Leo McGoldrick and Richard Carey 0-1 each	Owenbeg; Referee: Damien Harkin (Slaughtmanus)

29 August 2017; 7:45 pm Quarter-final	Glen	2-17 - 1-13	Kilrea	Owenbeg; Referee: Alan Nash (Doire Trasna)
29 August 2017; 7:45 pm Quarter-final	Emmet Bradley 1-4 (0-3f, 1 '45), Ciaran McFaul 1-3, Stevie O'Hara 0-5, Paul Gunning 0-3, Conor Convery 0-2	Report	Larry Kielt 1-1 (0-1f), Brian Óg McAlary, Charlie Kielt, James Kielt (0-1f), Steven Johnston, Benny Quigg 0-2 each, Niall Johnston and Paddy McNeill 0-1 each	Owenbeg; Referee: Alan Nash (Doire Trasna)

== Semi-finals ==
9 September 2017; 4:45 pm Semi-final	Ballinascreen	0-11 – 0-9	Greenlough	Owenbeg; Attendance: 4,038; Referee: Barry Cassidy (Bellaghy); Man of the Match: Carlus McWilliams
9 September 2017; 4:45 pm Semi-final	Shane Mulgrew 0-5 (0-3f), Barry Grant 0-2, Kieran Conway, Carlus McWilliams, Brendan Herron, Benny Heron 0-1 each		Niall Loughlin 0-5 (0-2f), Enda Lynn 0-3 (0-2f), Niall Bradley 0-1	Owenbeg; Attendance: 4,038; Referee: Barry Cassidy (Bellaghy); Man of the Match: Carlus McWilliams

10 September 2017; 3:30 pm Semi-final	Slaughtneil	0-13 - 0-6	Glen	Páirc na gCeilteach, Doire; Attendance: 4,256; Referee: Daniel Mullan (Glenullin); Man of the Match: Paul McNeill
10 September 2017; 3:30 pm Semi-final	Paul Bradley 0-4 (0-3f), Sé McGuigan 0-3, Shane McGuigan 0-2, Chrissy McKaigue, Patsy Bradley, Christopher Bradley, Cormac O'Doherty 0-1 each		Emmet Bradley (0-1f, 1 '45) and Danny Tallon (0-2f) 0-2 each, Cathal Mullholland and John McCamley 0-1 each	Páirc na gCeilteach, Doire; Attendance: 4,256; Referee: Daniel Mullan (Glenullin); Man of the Match: Paul McNeill

== Final ==
24 September 2017; 3:30; Final	Slaughtneil	4-12 - 1-11	Ballinascreen	Páirc na gCeilteach, Doire; Attendance: 4,029; Referee: Daniel Mullan (Glenullin); Man of the Match: Shane McGuigan
24 September 2017; 3:30; Final	Shane McGuigan 2-4 (0-1f), Chrissy McKaigue and Keelan Feeney 1-0 each, Christopher Bradley 0-3, Padraig Cassidy, Paul Bradley (0-1f), Meehaul McGrath, Sé McGuigan, Ronan Bradley 0-1 each	Report	Shane Mulgrew 0-4f, Anton Kelly 1-0, Phillip Bradley and Brendan Herron 0-2 each, Benny Heron, Ronan Murphy, Barry Grant 0-1 each	Páirc na gCeilteach, Doire; Attendance: 4,029; Referee: Daniel Mullan (Glenullin); Man of the Match: Shane McGuigan

== Top Scorers ==
Rank	Player	Club	Score First round	Score QF	Score SF	Score F	Total	Points
1	Shane McGuigan	Slaughneil	1-04	0-05	0-02	2-04	3-15	24pts
2	Shane Mulgrew	Ballinascreen	0-05	1-04	0-05	0-04	1-18	21pts
3	Emmett Bradley	Glen	2-05	1-04	0-01	N/A	3-10	19pts
4	Niall Loughlin	Greenlough	1-04	1-03	0-05	N/A	2-12	18pts
5	Conleith Gilligan	Ballinderry	1-09	0-04	N/A	N/A	1-13	16pts
5	Benny Heron	Ballinascreen	2-03	1-02	0-01	0-01	3-07	16pts
