= 2025 Derry Senior Football Championship =

Gaelic football competition

Tournament details
- County: Derry
- Year: 2025
- Trophy: John McLaughlin Cup
- Teams: 16
- Defending champions: Newbridge

Winners
- Champions: Newbridge (11th win)
- Manager: Kevin Brady & Gary Hetherington
- Captain: Conor McAteer

Runners-up
- Runners-up: Magherafelt
- Manager: Gavin Devlin

Promotion/Relegation
- Promoted team(s): Glenullin
- Relegated team(s): Drumsurn

Other
- Player of the Year: Conor McGrogan
- Top Scorer: Shane McGuigan & Shane Heavron
- Website: derrygaa.ie

The 2025 Derry Senior Football Championship was the 104th edition of Derry GAA's premier gaelic football tournament for the top clubs. The sixteen teams who qualified for the 2025 senior championship (14 Senior League teams and 2 Intermediate League teams) are explained in the 'Competition Format' section below.

Newbridge beat Magherafelt 1–17 to 1–15 in an entertaining final in Celtic Park to win their 11th overall Derry Senior Football Championship and their second win in a row. Centre half back Conor McGrogan won Player of the Match in the final

== Competition format ==
2025 Senior Championship The 2025 Senior Championship format was changed from a group stage format to a "Back-Door" rormat. The format was as follows:

- Round 1 - Open Draw 8v8
  - Round 2A - Round 1 Winner vs Round 1 Winner (Open Draw)
    - Winners of Round 2A straight into quarter final (Pot 1)
  - Round 2B - Round 1 Loser vs Round 1 Loser (Open Draw)
    - Losers of Round 2B into Relegation Playoff Semi Final (Open Draw)
- Round 3 - Round 2A losers v Round 2B Winners (Pot 2)
- Quarter Final - Pot 1 v Pot 2
- Semi Final - Open Draw
- Final

== Clubs in 2025 championship ==
| Club | League |
|---|---|
| Ballinderry | Senior League |
| Ballinascreen | Senior League |
| Banagher | Intermediate League |
| Bellaghy | Senior League |
| Dungiven | Senior League |
| Drumsurn | Intermediate League |
| Faughanvale | Senior League |
| Glen | Senior League |
| Kilrea | Senior League |
| Lavey | Senior League |
| Loup | Senior League |
| Magherafelt | Senior League |
| Newbridge | Senior League |
| Slaughtneil | Senior League |
| Steelstown | Senior League |
| Swatragh | Senior League |

== Round 1 ==
| 13 August 2025 Round 1 | Lavey | 4-19 – 1-17 | Drumsurn | Owenbeg |
| 7.15pm |
| | Gls: R McGill 2-1, N Toner 1-2 (1f), J Duggan 0-5 (1 tp, 1f), H McGurk 1-1, C O’Kane 0-2 (1 tp), R Mulholland 0-2, J McGurk 0-2, L Regan 0-1 (1 ’45), M McGurk 0-1, N Duggan 0-1, L Murphy 0-1 | | Gls: T McHugh 1-4, S Murray 0-4 (1 tp), C Friel 0-4 (2 f)D Rafferty 0-2 (1 tp), C Mullan 0-1 (1f), T Wood 0-1, N McNicholl 0-1 (1f) | Referee: Harry Tohill |

| 16 August 2025 Round 1 | Swatragh | 2-18 – 2-21 | Loup | Owenbeg |
| 1.00pm |
| | Gls: S Kearney 2-9 (1-5f, 0-2 tpf), P Kearney 0-3 (1tp), F Kearney 0-2 (tp), L McWilliams 0-2, N Coyle and F Coyle 0-1 each | | Gls: Ciaran Devlin 0-11 (1tp, 1tpf, 2f), Anthony O’Neill 1-3, Caolan Devlin 1-2 (0-1f), A McAlynn 0-2, C Lagan, D Rocks and N Baine 0-1 each | Referee: Richie Donoghue |

| 16 August 2025 Round 1 | Steelstown | 2-27 – 5-13 | Faughanvale | Owenbeg |
| 2.45pm |
| | Gls: Callum Deery 1-3, Cahir McMonagle 1-16 (5tp, 1tpf, 2f); Ben McCarron 0-3; Ryan Devine 0-2; Neil Forester 0-1; Eoin Canavan 0-1; Diarmuid Baker 0-1 | | Gls: Shea Martin 2-1; Eoin McElhinney 1-3 (1pen, 1f); Paddy O'Kane 0-3 (1tp, 1f); Tiernan McFeely 0-1; Jude Bryson 1-3; Conor McGuinness 1-1 (1pen); Aaron Mullan 0-1 | Referee: Martin McErlain |

| 16 August 2025 Round 1 | Slaughtniel | 2-22 – 1-12 | Kilrea | Owenbeg |
| 5.30pm |
| | Gls: James Kielt 0-7 (1 tp), Paddy Quigg 1-1, PJ McAleese 0-2 (1 tp), Kevin Quinn 0-1, Tommy Rogers 0-1 | | Gls: Shane McGuigan 0-10 (1 ’45, 3f, 1 tp), Christopher Bradley 1-3 (2f), Fionn McEldowney 1-0, Chrissy McKaigue 0-2 (1 tp), Brendan Rogers 0-2 (1 tp), Ruairi O Mianain 0-2 (1 tp), Cahal McKaigue 0-1, Shea Cassidy 0-1, Conor Coyle 0-1 | Referee: Cianan Canney |

| 31 August 2025 Round 1 | Magherafelt | 1-22 – 1-13 | Ballinascreen | Owenbeg |
| 7.15pm |
| | | | | Referee: Patrick Devlin |

| 17 August 2025 Round 1 | Banagher | 0.16 – 1-17 | Glen | Owenbeg |
| 1.00pm |
| | Gls: Tiarnan Moore 0-10 (1f, 2 tpf), Peter Hagan, Eoin Devine, Eamon Og Feeney, Callum O'Kane 0-1 each | | Gls: Johnny McGuckin 1-2, Ethan Doherty 0-5 (2 tps), Danny Tallon 0-3f, Jack Doherty, Conor Carville 0-2 each, Conor Convery, Conleth McGuckin 0-1 each | Referee: Brendan Quinn |

| 17 August 2025 Round 1 | Ballinderry | 0-18 – 1-22 | Bellaghy | Owenbeg |
| 2.45pm |
| | | | | Referee: Thomas Devlin |

| 17 August 2025 Round 1 | Newbridge | 0-11 – 2-15 | Dungiven | Owenbeg |
| 4.30pm |
| | Gls: Oisin Doherty (tpf, 1f), Conor Doherty (tp) 0-3 each, Paudi McGrogan 0-2, Eamon Young, Conor McAteer, Sean Young 0-1 each | | Gls: Niall McGonigle 1-9 (6f), Joe Dillon 1-2, Odhran Muphy 0-2 (tp), Conor Murphy, Kevin Johnston 0-1 each | Referee: Richie Donoghue |

== Round 2 ==
=== Round 2A ===
| 29 August 2025 Round 2A | Steelstown | 2-14 – 1-11 | Loup | Owenbeg |
| 7.30pm |
| | | | | Referee: Richie Donoghue |

| 30 August 2025 Round 2A | Bellaghy | 0-14 – 2-16 | Slaughtneil | Owenbeg |
| 7.30pm |
| | | | | Referee: Brendan Quinn |

| 30 August 2025 Round 2A | Glen | 4-09 – 2-06 | Dungiven | Owenbeg |
| 7.30pm |
| | | | | Referee: Cianan Canney |

| 31 August 2025 Round 2A | Lavey | 1-12 – 3-09 | Magherafelt | Owenbeg |
| 4.30pm |
| | | | | Referee: Barry Cassidy |

=== Round 2B ===
| 29 August 2025 Round 2B | Faughanvale | 3-17 – 3-08 | Drumsurn | Celtic Park (Derry) |
| 7.30pm |
| | | | | Referee: Damien Harkin |

| 30 August 2025 Round 2B | Ballinascreen | 2-18 – 1-24 | Kilrea | Owenbeg |
| 2.00pm |
| | | | | Referee: Cathal Doherty |

| 31 August 2025 Round 2B | Banagher | 2-15 – 1-16 | Ballinderry | Owenbeg |
| 1.00pm |
| | | | | Referee: Michael Kelly |

| 31 August 2025 Round 2B | Newbridge | 0-23 – 0-12 | Swatragh | Owenbeg |
| 2.45pm |
| | | | | Referee: Caolan Hazlett |

== Relegation Playoff ==
Drumsurn conceded the relegation playoff so they were automatically relegated to the Derry Intermediate Football Championship for the 2026 season

| Relegation Playoff | Drumsurn | v | Ballinascreen | Owenbeg |

| Relegation Playoff | Swatragh | v | Ballinderry | Owenbeg |

== Round 3 ==
| 13 September 2025 Round 3 | Faughanvale | 3-11 – 2-20 | Bellaghy | Owenbeg |
| 3.00pm |
| | Gls: Paddy O'Kane 0-6 (2tpf, 1f),Shane McElhinney 1-0, Eoin McElhinney 1-1, Jude Bryson 1-0, Conor McGuinness 0-1, Shea Martin 0-1, Kevin Martin 0-1, Jordan Curran 0-1 | | Gls: Damon Gallagher 1-9 (1tpf, 1f), Oisin McErlean 1-1, Charlie Diamond 0-5 (2f), Dara Doherty 0-2, Declan Cassidy 0-1, Luke Diamond 0-1, Ciaran Chambers 0-1 | Referee: Martin McErlaine |

| 13 September 2025 Round 3 | Newbridge | 1-25 – 1-04 | Loup | Owenbeg |
| 4.45pm |
| | Gls: Oisin Doherty 1-7 (1tp, 4f), Sean Young 0-4, Mark Doherty 0-3, Conor McAteer 0-3, Eamon Young 0-3 (1f), Padraig McGrogan 0-2 (1tp), Conor Doherty 0-3 (1tp) | | Gls: Ciaran Devlin 1-1, Aaron McAlynn 0-2 (1tpf), Adam Canavan 0-1 | Referee: Barry Cassidy |

| 14 September 2025 Round 3 | Kilrea | 0-05 – 1-20 | Lavey | Owenbeg |
| 3.00pm |
| | | | | Referee: Richie Donoghue |

| 14 September 2025 Round 3 | Banagher | 1-18 – 0-17 | Dungiven | Owenbeg |
| 4.45pm |
| | | | | Referee: Thomas Devlin |

== Quarter Final ==
| 27 September 2025 Quarter FInal | Glen | 2-19 – 1-10 | Banagher | Owenbeg |
| 5.00pm |
| | | | | Referee: Caolan Hazlett |

| 27 September 2025 Quarter FInal | Magherafelt | 2-21 – 1-12 | Bellaghy | Owenbeg |
| 7.00pm |
| | | Highlights | | Referee: Cianan Canney |

| 28 September 2025 Quarter FInal | Slaughtneil | 3-13 – 1-15 | Lavey | Owenbeg |
| 4.00pm |
| | Gls: Shane McGuigan 1-2, Shea Cassidy 1-1, Cathal O Mianain 1-0, Brendan Rogers 0-2, Ruairi O Mianain 0-2, Meehaul McGrath 0-1, Padraig Cassidy 0-2, Christopher Bradley 0-1, Paul McNeil 0-1, Cormac O'Doherty 0-1 | | Gls: Niall Toner 0-5 (1tp, 3f), Rory McGill 1-2, Jaimie Duggan 0-2 (1tp), Louis Regan 0-2, (1 tpf), Eamon McGill 0-2, Patrick McGurk 0-1, Ciaran Hendry 0-1 | Referee: Barry Cassidy |

| 28 September 2025 Quarter FInal | Steelstown | 1-12 – 0-18 | Newbridge | Owenbeg |
| 6.00pm |
| | Gls: Diarmuid Baker 1-0, Cahir McMonagle 0-8 (4f), Neil Forester 0-1, Shane O'Connor 0-2, Ben McCarron 0-1 (1f) | | Gls: Conor McAteer 0-4 (1tp), Oisin Doherty 0-3 (2f), Sean Young 0-2, Paudie McGrogan 0-1, Mark McGrogan 0-1, Eamon Young 0-5 (2f), Mark Doherty 0-1, Conleth McGrogan 0-1 | Referee: Brendan Quinn |

== Semi Final ==
| 11 October 2025 Semi Final | Glen | 1-14 – 4-15 | Magherafelt | Owenbeg |
| 7.00pm |
| | | | | Referee: Brendan Quinn |

| 12 October 2025 Semi Final | Slaughtneil | 1-16 – 0-21 | Newbridge | Owenbeg |
| 3.00pm |
| | | | | Referee: Martin McErlaine |

== Final ==
| 19 October 2025 Final | Magherafelt | 1-15 – 1-17 | Newbridge | Celtic Park (Derry) |
| 3.30pm |
| | Gls: S Heavron 1-8 (2tpf, 1f), D Higgins (tp), C Murphy 0-2 each, S McGuckin, C Spiers and C McCluskey 0-1 each | | Gls: C McAteer 0-5 (1tp), O Doherty 0-4 (1tp), Callum McGrogan 1-1, S Young 0-3, P McGrogan 0-2, C Doherty 0-1 and E Young 0-1 each | Referee: Brendan Quinn |

== Championship statistics ==
=== Top scorers ===
Overall

| Rank | Player | Club | Total | Matches | Average |
|---|---|---|---|---|---|
| 1 | Shane Heavron | Magherafelt | 4-24 | 5 | 7.2 |
| 2 | Shane McGuigan | Slaughtniel | 4-24 | 4 | 9 |
| 3 | Tiernan Moore | Banagher | 1-31 | 4 | 8.5 |
| 4 | Cahir McMonagle | Steelstown | 1-31 | 4 | 8.5 |
| 5 | Oisin Doherty | Newbridge | 1-26 | 5 | 5.8 |
| 6 | Niall Toner | Lavey | 2-20 | 4 | 6.5 |
| 7 | Damon Gallagher | Bellaghy | 2-18 | 4 | 6 |
| 8 | Sean Kearney | Swatragh | 2-17 | 3 | 7.6 |
| 9 | Conor McAteer | Newbridge | 0-21 | 5 | 4.2 |
| 10 | Charlie Diamond | Bellaghy | 0-20 | 4 | 5 |

=== Most scored in a single game ===
Overall

| Rank | Player | Club | Tally | Total | Opponent |
|---|---|---|---|---|---|
| 1 | Cahir McMonagle | Steelstown | 1-16 | 19 | Faughanvale |
| 2 | Sean Kearney | Swatragh | 2-09 | 15 | Loup |
| 3 | Tiarnan Moore | Banagher | 1-10 | 13 | Glen |
| 4 | Damon Gallagher | Bellaghy | 1-09 | 12 | Faughanvale |
| 4 | Niall McGonigle | Dungiven | 1-09 | 12 | Newbridge |
| 5 | Shane Heavron | Magherafelt | 1-08 | 11 | Newbridge |
