= John Murphy (Derry Gaelic footballer) =

Derry Gaelic footballer

Personal information
- Native name: Seán Ó Murchú (Irish)
- Born: Newbridge, County Londonderry, Northern Ireland
- Died: 2009

Sport
- Sport: Gaelic football
- Position: Back
Club
- Years: Club
- Newbridge
Inter-county
- Years: County
- Derry
Inter-county titles
- NFL: 1

John Murphy (1925 or 1926–2009) was a Gaelic footballer who played for the Derry county team. He was part of the first Derry side to win the National Football League.

Murphy played club football for Seán O'Leary's and won the Derry Senior Football Championship with the club.

== Personal life ==
Murphy was originally from Newbridge. He was principal of St Pius X College, Magherafelt. He was married with four children. He died in August 2009 aged 83 and was buried in St Patrick's Church at Glen, Maghera.

== Playing career ==
John Murphy played club football for Seán O'Leary's GAC Newbridge, and won Derry Championship medals with the club.

Murphy was right half-back when Derry won the county's first National Football League title in 1947, defeating Clare in the final at Croke Park. It was also the county's first ever national title.

He played for Ulster in 1950. Having played in the Railway Cup semi-final, he missed the final through injury. Ulster won the final, but Murphy did not receive a winners' medal at the time, but was presented with his medal 58 years later in 2008.

== Honours ==
=== Inter-county ===
- National Football League (1): 1947

=== Province ===
- Railway Cup (1): 1950
