= 2018 Derry Senior Football Championship =

Gaelic football competition

Tournament details
- County: Derry
- Year: 2018
- Trophy: John McLaughlin Cup
- Teams: 16
- Defending champions: Slaughtneil

Winners
- Champions: Coleraine (2nd win)
- Manager: Sean McGoldrick
- Captain: Colm McGoldrick
- Qualify for: Ulster Club SFC

Runners-up
- Runners-up: Lavey
- Manager: John Brennan
- Captain: Cailean O'Boyle

The 2018 Derry Senior Football Championship was the 95th edition of Derry GAA's premier gaelic football tournament for the sixteen senior clubs in Derry Football League Division 1. The winners received the John McLaughlin Cup.

Coleraine won their second title, beating Lavey by 1-12 to 0-12 in the final at Celtic Park on 28 October 2018.

Slaughtneil were the defending champions, having won "4-in-a-row" by defeating Ballinascreen 4-12 to 1-11 in the final on 24 September 2017 in Celtic Park. They were beaten by 1-11 to 0-13 by Coleraine on 3 October 2018 in a quarter-final replay. This was their first defeat in the Derry senior championship since they lost to Lavey by 3-07 to 1-11 in a first round game on 16 August 2015. They subsequently progressed through the qualifier system to win the 2015 championship.

== Competition format ==
Current format

The senior championship reverted to straight knock-out in 2016 and the format continues with some minor alterations. If the score is level at the end of the normal sixty minutes, the match is replayed. If the replay is also level at the end of normal time, two ten minutes halves are played each way. At the end (or close to the end) of each round, a random draw is held to determine the fixtures in the next round.

In Derry, relegation or promotion within the league system determines which championship a club competes in – Division 1 teams compete in the senior championship, Division 2 teams in the intermediate championship and Division 3 teams in the junior championship.

2018 was the last year for this league format as the adult football leagues in Derry were restructured to Division 1A - 12 teams, Division 1B - 12 teams and Division 2 - 14 teams (previously there were 16 teams in Division 1, 14 teams in Division 2 and 8 teams in Division 3) for the start of the 2019 season. Five teams were relegated from the 2018 Division 1 to the new 2019 Division 1B (see section 'Relegations and promotions in 2018' below for details). The 2019 senior championship was competed for by the top 15 teams in the 2018 Division 1 and Banagher, the winners of the 2018 Division 2. Claudy, who finished 16th in 2018, were relegated to the 2019 intermediate football championship.

Previous Formats

A back-door format was used from 2009 to 2015. Four initial ‘round-robin’ groups of four teams with the top two teams in each group progressing to the four knockout quarter-finals were used in seasons 2007 and 2008.

== Recent history of relegations and promotions ==
=== Relegations and promotions in 2018 ===
Five teams were relegated from the old Division 1 in 2018 to the new Division 1B in 2019.

- Newbridge finished 12th with 12 points and played Banagher, the Division 2 winners, in a relegation/promotion match on 12 October 2018. Banagher won by 2-08 to 1-07 and were promoted to the new Division 1A. Newbridge were relegated to the new Division 1B.
- Kilrea finished 13th with 12 points and were relegated to the new Division 1B
- Greenlough finished 14th with 8 points and were relegated to the new Division 1B
- Glenullin finished 15th with 5 points and were relegated to the new Division 1B
- Claudy finished 16th with 3 points and were relegated to the new Division 1B

All the 2018 Division 1 teams except Claudy (who finished bottom) retained the right to play in the 2019 senior championship. Claudy's place was taken by Banagher, the winners of the 2018 Division 2.

=== Relegations and promotions in 2017 ===
- After Division 1 football ended on 6 August 2017, Swatragh were 15th in the table with eight points and Banagher were 16th with six points. Swatragh were initially penalised three league points for not fielding against Coleraine which would have meant that Swatragh were relegated. The three point penalty was subsequently overturned and Banagher were relegated.
- Newbridge won Division 2 in 2017 and were promoted to Division 1 and the senior championship for 2018.

=== Relegations and promotions in 2016 ===
- Newbridge finished bottom (i.e. 16th) in Division 1 in 2016 and were relegated to Division 2.
- Glenullin won Division 2 in 2016 and were promoted to Division 1 for 2017. They applied to compete in the 2016 senior championship and were allowed to do so.

=== Relegations and promotions in 2015 ===
- Foreglen finished in the bottom two in Division 1 in 2015 and were relegated to Division 2 following their loss to Glenullin in the Division 1 relegation playoff.
- Glenullin finished in the bottom two in Division 1 in 2015 and were relegated to Division 2 following their loss to Claudy in the Division 1/Division 2 relegation/promotion playoff. Glenullin successfully applied to be allowed to play in the 2016 senior football championship.
- Greenlough won Division 2 in 2015 and were promoted to Division 1 for 2016.
- Claudy finished second in Division 2 in 2015 and were promoted to Division 1 following their victory over Glenullin in the Division 1/Division 2 relegation/promotion playoff.

== Senior Championship Draw ==
The championship begins on Friday 7 September 2018. The draw for the first round was held on Tuesday 15 May 2018. Subsequent draws are held at the end (or very near the end) of every round. The bracket below can only be completed when the semi-final draw is announced.

First round
Slaughtneil | 0-10
Magherafelt | 0-05
Coleraine | 2-10
Glenullin | 0-12
Ballinascreen | 2-10
Bellaghy | 0-14
Greenlough | 3-14
Newbridge | 0-09
The Loup | 1-12
Claudy | 0-14
Lavey | 0-11
Dungiven | 0-06
Ballinderry | 1-10
Kilrea | 0-08
Glen | 1-15
Swatragh | 0-13

Quarter-Finals
Slaughtneil | 0-15(d); 0-13(r)
Coleraine | 1-12(d); 1-11(r)
Ballinascreen | 0-13
Greenlough | 1-09
The Loup | 1-08(d); 1-17(r)
Lavey | 2-05(d); 2-15(r)
Ballinderry | 0-17
Glen | 1-15

Semi-Finals
Coleraine | 1-11
Ballinascreen | 0-09
Lavey | 2-11
Glen | 1-06

Final; 21 October 2018
Coleraine | 1-12
Lavey | 0-12

== First round ==
| 7 September 2018; 8:30 pm First round | Coleraine | 2-10 - 0-12 | Glenullin | Owenbeg; Attendance: 751; Referee: H Tohill |
| 7 September 2018; 8:30 pm First round | Colm McGoldrick (1-1), B Daly (1-0), N Holly (0-2), R Mooney (0-2), L McGoldrick (0-1), G McWilliams (0-1, 1f) M McTaggart (0-1) | | D O'Kane (0-11, 10f), B Mullan (0-1) | Owenbeg; Attendance: 751; Referee: H Tohill |

| 8 September 2018; 2:00 pm First round | The Loup | 1-22 - 0-14 | Claudy | Swatragh; Referee: M Corrigan |
| 8 September 2018; 2:00 pm First round | A O'Neill (1-7, 3f), Ciaran Devlin (0-3, 2f), Caolan Devlin (0-3, 2f), G Mallon (0-2), D McVey (0-2), B Doyle (0-2) T O'Brien (0-1), P Coney (0-1), P Young (0-1) | | A Kerrigan (0-7, 3f), E McGahon (0-2), P Hargan (0-2), O Armstrong (0-2) B Carlin (0-1), | Swatragh; Referee: M Corrigan |

| 8 September 2018; 6:00 pm First round | Glen | 1-15 - 0-13 | Swatragh | Owenbeg; Referee: B Quinn |
| 8 September 2018; 6:00 pm First round | E Bradley (0-6, 5f) E Mulholland (1-0), M Warnock (0-3, 2f), C McFaul (0-2), D Tallon (0-2), S O'Hara (0-2) | | F Kearney (0-8, 7f), J Kearney (0-1), C McAtamney (0-1, 45), B Diamond (0-1), N McAtamney (0-1), F McGurk (0-1) | Owenbeg; Referee: B Quinn |

| 8 September 2018; 7:30 pm First round | Ballinascreen | 2-10 - 0-14 | Bellaghy | Owenbeg; Attendance: 3808; Referee: M McGeehan |
| 8 September 2018; 7:30 pm First round | Benny Heron (2-2), S Mulgrew (0-6, 6f) Brendan Herron (0-1), C McWilliams (0-1) | | F Donnelly (0-6, 5f), R McNally (0-3), D Cassidy (0-2), E Brown (0-2, 1f), L Spier (0-1) | Owenbeg; Attendance: 3808; Referee: M McGeehan |

| 9 September 2018; 12:30 pm First round | Greenlough | 3-14 - 0-09 | Newbridge | Bellaghy; Referee: R O'Donoghue |
| 9 September 2018; 12:30 pm First round | E Lynn (1-9, 5f), M Bradley (1-0), C Diamond (1-0), B McCallion (0-2), J Kearney (0-1), S Bradley (0-1), N Bradley (0-1) | | P McGrogan (0-4, 3f), K Sweeney (0-2), M O'Neill (0-1), O McGlone (0-1), J Diamond (0-1) | Bellaghy; Referee: R O'Donoghue |

| 9 September 2018; 2:00 pm First round | Ballinderry | 1-10 - 0-08 | Kilrea | Bellaghy; Referee: M McAleese |
| 9 September 2018; 2:00 pm First round | C Gilligan (1-3, 1pen), R Bell (0-4, 3f), D McKinless (0-1), R Wilkinson (0-1). M McIver (0-1) | | J Kielt (0-7, 4f), E Rogers (0-1) | Bellaghy; Referee: M McAleese |

| 9 September 2018; 6:00 pm First round | Lavey | 0-11 - 0-06 | Dungiven | Owenbeg; Referee: B Cassidy |
| 9 September 2018; 6:00 pm First round | Cailean O'Boyle (0-3, 3f), N Toner (0-3), Ciaron O'Boyle (0-2, 2f), C Mulholland (0-1), S Downey (0-1), D Hughes (0-1) | | D McGilligan (0-3, 3f), K Johnston (0-1), C Murphy (0-1), R Mullan (0-1) | Owenbeg; Referee: B Cassidy |

| 9 September 2018; 7:30 pm First round | Slaughtneil | 0-10 - 0-05 | Magherafelt | Owenbeg; Referee: D Harkin |
| 9 September 2018; 7:30 pm First round | Shane McGuigan (0-5, 2f), B Cassidy (0-2), Sé McGuigan (0-1), C Bradley (0-1), B McEldowney (0-1) | | S Heavron (0-4, 4f), J Young (0-1) | Owenbeg; Referee: D Harkin |

== Quarter-finals ==
An altercation involving Greenlough players, management and a supporter occurred on the pitch in the aftermath of Greenlough's quarter-final defeat to Ballinascreen. Referee Damien Harkin and one of his umpires were allegedly assaulted.

| 22 September 2018; 2.15pm Quarter-Final | Ballinascreen | 0-13 - 1-09 | Greenlough | Dungiven; Referee: Damien Harkin (Slaughtmanus) |
| 22 September 2018; 2.15pm Quarter-Final | S Mulgrew (0-7, 6f), Brendan Herron (0-2), Benny Heron (0-1) R Devlin (0-1), M McShane (0-1), C McWilliams (0-1) | | E Lynn (0-4, 1 '45, 1f), N Bradley (1-0), N Loughlin (0-2, 2f), C Diamond (0-1), E McNally (0-1), S Bradley (0-1) | Dungiven; Referee: Damien Harkin (Slaughtmanus) |

| 22 September 2018; 5.45pm Quarter-Final | Glen | 1-15 - 0-17 | Ballinderry | Owenbeg; Attendance: 3,400; Referee: Daniel Mullan (Glenullin) |
| 22 September 2018; 5.45pm Quarter-Final | E Bradley (0-6, 4f), D Tallon (1-2, 1f), M Warnock (0-4), C McFaul (0-1), C Convery (0-1) | | C Gilligan (0-7, 4f), R Bell (0-4), D Lawn (0-1), D McKinless (0-1), R Wilkinson (0-1), Aaron Mullan (0-1) | Owenbeg; Attendance: 3,400; Referee: Daniel Mullan (Glenullin) |

| 23 September 2018; 2pm Quarter-Final | Lavey | 2-05 - 1-08 | The Loup | Ballinascreen; Referee: Mervyn McAleese (Drum) |
| 23 September 2018; 2pm Quarter-Final | A McGurk (1-2, 2f), E McGill (1-1), H McGurk (0-1), N Toner (0-1, 1f) | | B Doyle (1-1), A O'Neill (0-3, 2f), Caolan Devlin (0-2, 1f) Ciaran Devlin (0-1) C McVey (0-1) | Ballinascreen; Referee: Mervyn McAleese (Drum) |

| 23 September 2018; 6:15pm Quarter-Final | Slaughtneil | 0-15 - 1-12 | Coleraine | Owenbeg; Attendance: 2,640; Referee: Barry Cassidy (Bellaghy) |
| 23 September 2018; 6:15pm Quarter-Final | C Bradley (0-5, 3f), Shane McGuigan (0-3), B Cassidy (0-2), P Cassidy (0-2), J McGuigan (0-2), C McKaigue (0-1) | | L McGoldrick (1-1), G McWilliams (0-4, 3f), Colm McGoldrick (0-4, 3f), N Holly (0-2), R Carey (0-1) | Owenbeg; Attendance: 2,640; Referee: Barry Cassidy (Bellaghy) |

| 27 September 2018; 8pm Quarter-Final; Replay | Lavey | 2-15 - 1-17 | The Loup | Owenbeg; Attendance: 1534; Referee: Mark McGeehan (Ballinderry) |
| 27 September 2018; 8pm Quarter-Final; Replay | N Toner (2-4, 0-1p), K O'Neill (0-3), Ciaron O'Boyle (0-2, 2f), Cailean O'Boyle (0-2,2f), A McGurk (0-2), C Henry (0-1), C Murphy (0-1) | | Caolan Devlin (0-7, 2f) A O'Neill (0-6, 5f), J Rocks (1-0), B Doyle (0-2), Ciaran Devlin (0-1), C McGinley (0-1) | Owenbeg; Attendance: 1534; Referee: Mark McGeehan (Ballinderry) |

| 3 October 2018; 8pm Quarter-Final; Replay | Slaughtneil | 0-13 - 1-11 | Coleraine | Owenbeg; Attendance: 3263; Referee: Dan Mullan (Glenullin) |
| 3 October 2018; 8pm Quarter-Final; Replay | B Cassidy (0-5), C Bradley (0-4, 2f 1 '45), Shane McGuigan (0-3, 1f), R Bradley (0-1) | | Colm McGoldrick (1-5, 4f), L McGoldrick (0-2), Ciaran McGoldrick (0-2) N Holly (0-1), B Daly (0-1) | Owenbeg; Attendance: 3263; Referee: Dan Mullan (Glenullin) |

== Semi-finals ==
| 7 October 2018; 1pm Semi-Final | Lavey | 2-11 - 1-06 | Glen | Owenbeg; Referee: Barry Cassidy (Bellaghy) |
| 7 October 2018; 1pm Semi-Final | N Toner (0-4), D Hughes (1-0), E McGill (1-0), Ciaron O'Boyle (0-3, 3f), A McGurk (0-2, 1f), K O'Neill (0-1), Cailean O'Boyle (0-1, 1f) | | E Bradley (1-0), J Doherty (0-2), D Tallon (0-1, 1f), S O'Hara (0-1) C McFaul (0-1) M Warnock (0-1) | Owenbeg; Referee: Barry Cassidy (Bellaghy) |

| 7 October 2018; 2.45pm Semi-Final | Coleraine | 1-11 - 0-09 | Ballinascreen | Owenbeg; Attendance: 3785; Referee: Mervyn McAleese (Drum) |
| 7 October 2018; 2.45pm Semi-Final | N Holly (1-0), G McWilliams (0-3, 2f), R Mooney (0-3), Colm McGoldrick (0-2, 2f), Ciaran McGoldrick (0-1), B McGoldrick (0-1), C Mullan (0-1) | | Benny Heron (0-3), S Mulgrew (0-2, 1f), M Bradley (0-1), P Bradley (0-1), S Woods (0-1), A Scullion (0-1) | Owenbeg; Attendance: 3785; Referee: Mervyn McAleese (Drum) |

== Final ==
| 21 October 2018; 3:30 pm Final | Coleraine | 1-12 - 0-12 | Lavey | Páirc na gCeilteach; Attendance: 3700; Referee: Damien Harkin (Slaughtmanus); Man of the Match: Liam McGoldrick |
| 21 October 2018; 3:30 pm Final | Colm McGoldrick (0-4, 4f), L McGoldrick (0-4, 2f), B Daly (1-0), G McWilliams (0-2, 1f), SL McGoldrick (0-1), Ciaran McGoldrick (0-1) | Report | Cailean O'Boyle (0-7, 6f), E McGill (0-1), A McGurk (0-1), N Toner (0-1), C Henry (0-1), L Murphy (0-1) | Páirc na gCeilteach; Attendance: 3700; Referee: Damien Harkin (Slaughtmanus); Man of the Match: Liam McGoldrick |

== Top Scorers ==
- Updated 21 October 2018*

| Rank | Player | Club | Score | Total |
|---|---|---|---|---|
| 1 | Colm McGoldrick | Coleraine | 2-16 | 22 |
| 2 | Anthony O'Neill | Loup | 1-16 | 19 |
| 2 | Niall Toner | Lavey | 2-13 | 19 |
| 4 | Enda Lynn | Greenlough | 1-13 | 16 |
| 5 | Shane Mulgrew | Ballinascreen | 0-15 | 15 |
