= 2020 Derry Senior Football Championship =

Gaelic football competition

Tournament details
- County: Derry
- Year: 2020
- Trophy: John McLaughlin Cup
- Teams: 16
- Defending champions: Magherafelt

Winners
- Champions: Slaughtneil (6th win)
- Manager: Paul Bradley
- Captain: Karl McKaigue

Runners-up
- Runners-up: Magherafelt
- Manager: Adrian Cush
- Captain: Danny Heavron

Other
- Top Scorer: Shane McGuigan (4-47)
- Website: derrygaa.ie

The 2020 Derry Senior Football Championship was the 97th edition of Derry GAA's premier gaelic football tournament for the top clubs. The sixteen teams who qualified for the 2020 senior championship are explained in the 'Competition Format' section below.

Due to the COVID-19 pandemic, all Gaelic Game activity was suspended in March. As a result the 2020 Derry senior championship was changed to an initial group structure where each team played three games before playing at least one game in the final knockout stage.

Slaughtneil beat the defending champions Magherafelt 0-11 to 1-04 at Bellaghy to win their 6th title.

The winners received the John McLaughlin Cup.

== Competition format ==
Senior, Intermediate and Junior Championships

Team performances in 2019 in the football league and championships were used to determine which of the three 2020 championships the thirty seven clubs competed in –

- 2020 Senior Championship (16 teams)
  All twelve 2019 Division 1A teams plus four 2019 Division 1B teams.
  The winners of the 2019 intermediate championship must be included.
- 2020 Intermediate Championship (12 teams)
  Eight 2019 Division 1B teams plus four 2019 Division 2 teams.
  The winners of the 2019 junior championship must be included.
- 2020 Junior Championship (9 teams)
  Nine 2019 Division 2 teams.
  Ógra Colmcille opted out in 2019.

Senior Championship Teams in 2019

The restructured adult football leagues in Derry of Division 1A (12 teams), Division 1B (12 teams) and Division 2 (13 teams) were introduced in 2019. Five teams were relegated from the 2018 Division 1 to the new 2019 Division 1B (see section 'Relegations and promotions in 2018' below for details). The 2019 senior championship was competed for by the top fifteen teams in the 2018 Division 1 and Banagher, the winners of the 2018 Division 2. Claudy, who finished 16th in 2018, were relegated to the 2019 intermediate football championship.

2020 Format

Initially the sixteen teams were drawn into four groups of four teams. Each team were guaranteed three group games and at least one knockout game. All sixteen teams qualified for the knock-out stages. In the first round draw the teams were seeded from the group stage with the group winners playing the teams who finished fourth and the group runner-ups playing the teams who finished third. The quarter final draw was open but subject to the restriction that repeat pairings be avoided if possible. The semi final draw was open.

== Recent history of relegations and promotions ==
=== Relegations and promotions in 2019 ===
Senior Championship

All twelve teams in the 2019 Division 1A automatically qualified for the 2020 senior championship. Four 2019 Division 1B teams also qualified for the 2020 senior football championship –

- Claudy finished 1st in 2019 Division 1B with 19 points.
- Newbridge finished 2nd in 2019 Division 1B with 17 points.
- Kilrea finished 3rd in 2019 Division 1B with 14 points.
- Foreglen won the intermediate championship, defeating Claudy by 0-15 to 0-09. Foreglen took the place in the 2020 senior championship reserved for the 2019 intermediate champions (instead of Greenlough who finished 4th in 2019 Division 1B with 14 points).

League

Two teams were relegated from Division 1A and were replaced by two teams from Division 1B –

- Dungiven finished 11th in 2019 Division 1A with 3 points. They were relegated but retained the right to play in the 2020 senior football championship.
- Banagher finished 12th in 2019 Division 1A with 0 points. They were relegated but retained the right to play in the 2020 senior football championship.
- Claudy finished 1st in 2019 Division 1B with 19 points and were promoted.
- Newbridge finished 2nd in 2019 Division 1B with 17 points and were promoted.

== Senior Championship Group Stage ==
The draw for the group stage was held on Thursday 25 June 2020.

=== Group A ===
Pos	Team	Pld	W	D	L	PF	PA	PD	Pts
1	Loup	3	2	1	0	47	42	+5	5
2	Newbridge	3	2	0	1	54	33	+21	4
3	Bellaghy	3	1	1	1	45	41	+4	3
4	Foreglen	3	0	0	3	38	68	−30	0

Updated to match(es) played on unknown. Source:

1 August 2020 Round 1	The Loup	1-12 – 1-12	Bellaghy	Magherafelt
6:30 pm
	Gls: Paul Cassidy 1 Pts: Eoghan Brown 0-5, 4f; Ruairi McElwee 0-4, 1f; Peter Cassidy 0-2, 1m; Paul Cassidy 0-1		Gls: Ciaran Devlin 1 Pts: Anthony O'Neill 0-8, 7f, Declan McVey 0-1, Caolin Devlin 0-1, 1m, Gary Doyle 0-1, Ciaran Devlin 0-1	Referee: Brendan Quinn

2 August 2020 Round 1	Newbridge	3-19 – 1-08	Foreglen	Glen
6.30pm
	Gls: Mark McGrogan; Conor McAteer; Jude Diamond; Pts: Mark McGrogan 0-4, 1f; Conor McAteer 0-3; Jude Diamond 0-2, 1m; Peter McGrogan 0-4; PJ O'Neill 0-2; Paudi McGrogan 0-2; Conor Doherty 0-1, 1m; Nathan Rocks 0-1, 1m		Gls: Cathair O'Connor; Pts: Kevin O'Connor 0-3, 3f; Mark McCormick 0-3, 2f; Caolan O'Connor 0-2	Referee: Richie Donoghue

9 August 2020 Round 2	Bellaghy	2-16 – 0-13	Foreglen	Bellaghy
4pm
	Gls: Paul Cassidy; Peter Cassidy (Pen); Pts: Eoghan Brown 0-4, 4f; Paul Cassidy 0-2; Ruairi McElwee, Frankie Donnelly, Declan Cassidy 0-2 each; Ryan McNally, Kealan Friel 0-1 each		Pts: Kevin O'Connor 0-6, 6f; Cathair O'Connor 0-2; Mark McCormick 0-1, 1f; Caolan O'Connor, Eoghan Duffy, Padraic Morahan, Odhran McFeely (All 0-1)

9 August 2020 Round 2	Loup	2-08 – 1-10	Newbridge	Loup
4pm
	Gls: Anthony O'Neill 2 Pts: Anthony O'Neill 0-3, 3f; Caolin Devlin 0-2; Brian Doyle, Terence O'Brien, Thomas Mallon '45, 0-1 each		Gls: Conor McAteer 1 pen Pts: Conor McAteer 0-4; Mark McGrogan, Conor Doherty 0-2 each; Peter McGrogan, Jude Diamond m, 0-1 each

23 August 2020 Round 3	Newbridge	2-07 – 0-08	Bellaghy	Newbridge
4pm
	Gls: Jude Diamond, Peter McGrogan; Pts: Mark McGrogan 0-4, 2f; Jude Diamond, Aidan McGlone, Odhran McGlone All 0-1 each		Pts: Eoghan Brown 0-4, 3f; Kealan Friel, Declan Cassidy, Conleth McShane Chrissy Downey All 0-1 each	Referee: Dan Mullan

23 August 2020 Round 3	Foreglen	3-05 – 2-12	The Loup	Forglen
4pm
				Referee: Gavin Hegarty

=== Group B ===
Pos	Team	Pld	W	D	L	PF	PA	PD	Pts
1	Slaughtneil	3	3	0	0	67	25	+42	6
2	Coleraine	3	2	0	1	37	43	−6	4
3	Lavey	3	1	0	2	42	55	−13	2
4	Kilrea	3	0	0	3	32	55	−23	0

Updated to match(es) played on unknown. Source:

1 August 2020 Round 1	Slaughtneil	2-18 – 0-06	Kilrea	Slaughtneil
4pm
	Gls: Se McGuigan, Jerome McGuigan; Pts: Shane McGuigan 0-10, 4f, 3m, 1 '45; Brian Cassidy 0-4, 1f; Fergal Bradley 0-2; Se McGuigan 0-1; Cormac O'Doherty		Pts: James Kielt 0-2; Rory Maguire 0-1; Paddy Quigg 0-1; Daithi McLaughlin 0-1; Larry Kielt 0-1	Referee: Damian Harkin

1 August 2020 Round 1	Coleraine	3-07 – 1-10	Lavey	Coleraine
4pm
	Gls: Colm McGoldrick; Justin Donnelly; Ciaran Lenehan; Pts: Colm McGoldrick 0-3, 3f; Dara Mooney 0-2, 2f; Ciaran McGoldrick 0-1; Shea McLaughlin 0-1		Gls: Niall Toner; Pts: Niall Toner 0-2; Cailean O'Boyle 0-4, 4f; Fintan Bradley 0-2, Shea Downey 0-1, Liam Murphy 0-1	Referee: JJ Cleary

8 August 2020 Round 2	Slaughtneil	2-12 – 1-05	Coleraine	Greenlough
2pm
	Gls: Colm McGoldrick 1 pen Pts: Colm McGoldrick, Ciaran McGoldrick, Aidan McGonigle, SL McGoldrick, Devin Donnelly 0-1 each		Gls: Shane McGuigan 1 pen; Se McGuigan; Pts: Shane McGuigan 0-5; Brian Cassidy 0-3, 2f; Cormac O'Doherty 0-2; Meehaul McGrath, Chrissy Bradley, 0-1 each

9 August 2020 Round 2	Lavey	3-09 – 0-14	Kilrea	Swatragh
2pm
	Gls: Niall Toner, Cailean O'Boyle, Peter Rafferty; Pts: Cailean O'Boyle 0-4, 4f; Niall Toner 0-3, 1m; Liam Murphy, Anthony McGurk 0-1 each		Pts: James Kielt 0-8, 7f; Paddy Quigg 0-4, Larry Kielt 0-1, 1m; Conor Gillen 0-1, 1f

23 August 2020 Round 3	Lavey	2-05 – 3-16	Slaughtneil	Lavey
4pm
	Gls: Cailean O'Boyle, Ryan Mulholland; Pts: Cailen O'Boyle 0-2, 1f, 1m; Fintan Bradley 0-2, 1f; Thomas Donnelly 0-1		Gls: Shane McGuigan, Brian Cassisy, Ronan Bradley; Pts: Shane McGuigan 0-08, 1m, 1f; Chrissy McKaigue 0-3; Chrissy Bradley 0-2, 1f; Cormac O'Doherty, Meehaul McGrath, Paudie McGuigan All 0-1 each	Referee: Barry Cassidy

23 August 2020 Round 3	Kilrea	2-06 – 1-10	Coleraine	Kilrea
4pm
	Gls: Paddy Quigg, Larry Kielt; Pts: James Kielt 0-3; Conor Gillen, Kevin Quinn, Eoghan Rodgers All 0-1 each		Gls: Ciaran McGoldrick; Pts: Devin Donnelly 0-2; Lorcan McMullan 0-2, 2f; Colm McGoldrick, Ciaran McGoldrick, Aidan McGonigle, Barry Daly, Anton Rafferty All 0-1 each	Referee: Brendan Quinn

=== Group C ===
Pos	Team	Pld	W	D	L	PF	PA	PD	Pts
1	Glen	3	3	0	0	50	30	+20	6
2	Magherafelt	3	2	0	1	38	27	+11	4
3	Ballinderry	3	1	0	2	37	40	−3	2
4	Banagher	3	0	0	3	35	63	−28	0

Updated to match(es) played on unknown. Source:

1 August 2020 Round 1	Glen	2-18 – 1-10	Banagher	Glen
4pm
	Gls: Danny Tallon; Conleth McGuckin; Pts: Danny Tallon 0-3, 2f; Paul Gunning 0-3; Emmett Bradley 0-3, 3f; Conleth McGuckin, Ethan Doherty, Ciaran McFaul, Conor Convery (All 0-2); Jack Doherty 0-1, Michael Warnock 0-1		Gls: Gavin O'Neill; Pts: Tiarnan Moore 0-3, 2f; Ryan McGillion 0-2; Peter Hagan 0-2, 1f; Brian Og McGilligan, Conor Feeney, Niall Moore (All 0-1)	Referee: Dan Mullan

2 August 2020 Round 1	Magherafelt	1-11 – 0-06	Ballinderry	Magherafelt
4pm
	Gls: Peter Quinn; Pts: Shane Heavron 0-5, 3f; Danny Heavron 0-3; Conor Kearns 0-2; Emmett McGuckin 0-1		Pts: Ryan Bell 0-5, 4f, Gareth McKinless 0-1	Referee: Barry Cassidy

8 August 2020 Round 2	Magherafelt	1-05 – 0-11	Glen	Bellaghy
6.30pm
	Gls: Conor McCluskey; Pts: Shane Heavron 0-2, 2f; Danny Heavron 0-2, 1f; Aidan McCloskey		Pts: Paul Gunning 0-4, 2f; Danny Tallon 0-2, 1f; Emmett Bradley, Jack Doherty, Alex Doherty, Ryan Winton All 0-1; Ryan Dougan 0-1, 1m

9 August 2020 Round 2	Ballinderry	4-10 – 1-09	Banagher	Glen
6.30pm
	Gls: Ryan Bell 2; Gareth McKinless, Conor O'Neill 1 each Pts: Ryan Bell 0-7, 4f; Glenn McOscar 0-2, 1m; Ray Wilkinson 0-1, 1m		Gls: Niall Moore; Pts: Tiarnan Moore 0-4, 2f, Gavin O'Neill, Conor Feeney, Pauric McCloskey, Niall Moore All 0-1; Peter Hagan 0-1, 1f

22 August 2020 Round 3	Banagher	0-10 – 2-10	Magherafelt	Banagher
4pm
	Pts: Tiernan Moore 0-5, 3f; Niall Moore 0-2, 1f; Peter Hagan, Conor Feeney, Ciaran Lynch All 0-1 each		Gls: Niall Higgins, Emmett McGuckin; Pts: Shane Heavron 0-6, 5f; Danny Heavron 0-2, 2f; Conor Kearns, Emmett McGuckin 0-1 each	Referee: JJ Cleary

22 August 2020 Round 3	Ballinderry	0-09 – 0-14	Glen	Ballinderry
4pm
	Pts: Ryan Bell 0-4, 3f; Conor O'Neill, Sean Graham, Conor Nevin, Oisin Mullan, Matt Quinn All 0-1 each		Pts: Jack Doherty 0-3; Alex Doherty 0-2; Conor Carville 0-2; Danny Tallon 0-2, 1f; Paul Gunning 0-2, 2f; Emmett Bradley 0-2, 1f; Ethan Doherty, Ciaran McFaul 0-1 each	Referee: Harry Tohill

=== Group D ===
Pos	Team	Pld	W	D	L	PF	PA	PD	Pts
1	Swatragh	3	2	1	0	50	38	+12	5
2	Ballinascreen	3	2	0	1	48	41	+7	4
3	Claudy	3	0	2	1	37	43	−6	2
4	Dungiven	3	0	1	2	50	63	−13	1

Updated to match(es) played on unknown. Source:

1 August 2020 Round 1	Ballinascreen	1-11 – 1-5	Claudy	Ballinascreen
4pm
	Gls: Ronan Murphy; Pts: Shane Mulgrew 0-7, 7f; Benny Heron 0-2, 1'45; Conor McGovern 0-1; Carlus McWilliams 0-1		Gls: Oran Armstrong; Pts: Oran Armstrong 0-2, 2f; Eoin McGahon, Conor Gormley, Martin Donaghy (All 0-1)	Referee: Mervyn McAleese

1 August 2020 Round 1	Swatragh	2-15 – 1-14	Dungiven	Swatragh
4pm
	Gls: Lorcan McWilliams, OG; Pts: James Kearney 0-6, 3f; Francis Kearney 0-2, 1f; Jude McAtamney, Lorcan McWilliams (0-2 each), Sean Kearney, Brian Diamond (0-1 each)		Gls: Conor Murphy; Pts: Richie Mullan 0-8, 2m, 5f; Conor Kelly 0-1, 1f; Conor Murphy, Frank Dillon, Pauric McNicholl, Daire McKeever, Marty Burke (0-1 each)	Referee: Mark O'Neill

8 August 2020 Round 2	Claudy	1-11 – 1-11	Swatragh	Claudy
4pm
	Gls: Sean Kearney P Pts: Francis Kearney 0-4,3f; Jude McAtamney 0-3; James Kearney, Conor McAtamney, Niall McAtamney, Paul McAtamney all 0-1		Gls: Martin Donaghy; Pts: Aaron Kerrigan 0-6, 5f; Paddy Hargan, Conor Gormley 0-2 each; Oran Armstrong 0-1, 1f

9 August 2020 Round 2	Dungiven	2-12 – 4-15	Ballinascreen	Dungiven
4pm
	Gls: Sean McKeever, Daire McKeever; Pts: Ryan McElhinney 0-6, 4f; Richie Mullan 0-2, 2f; Conor Kelly, Marty Burke, Sean McKeever, Darragh McGilligan 0-1 each		Gls: Benny Heron 2, 1p; JP Devlin, Daniel McCullagh; Pts: Shane Mulgrew 0-5, 4f; JP Devlin 0-3; Benny Heron 0-2; Carlus McWilliams, Ronan McKenna, Anton Kelly, Philip Bradley, Ciaran Doyle 0-1 each

22 August 2020 Round 3	Dungiven	1-12 – 0-15	Claudy	Foreglen
6:30pm
	Gls: Richie Mullan 1p Pts: Ryan McElhinney 0-4, 3f; Richie Mullan 0-3, 3f; Pauric McNicholl, Marty Burke, Odhran McKeever, Thomas Brady, Fionntan Murphy All 0-1 each		Pts: Oran Armstrong 0-5, 4f; Aaron Kerrigan 0-3, 3f; Paddy Hargan, Martin Donaghy 0-2 each; Eoin McGahon, Conor Gormley, Shea Kerrigan 0-1 each	Referee: Cyril Hargan

23 August 2020 Round 3	Swatragh	0-15 – 0-07	Ballinascreen	Magherafelt
6.30pm
	Pts: James Kearney 0-6, 5f; Jude McAtamney 0-3, 3f; Francis Kearney 0-2; Sean Kearney, Conor McAtamney, Patrick Kearney, Francis Quinn All 0-1 each		Pts: Shane Mulgrew 0-4, 3f; Benny Heron, JP Devlin, Noel Rafferty All 0-1 each.	Referee: Anthony Campbell

== Senior Championship Full Draw ==
First Knockout Round
Slaughtneil	3-21
Foreglen	0-08
Glen	3-20
Kilrea	1-08
Ballinderry	2-18
Newbridge	1-15
Ballinascreen	1-12
Bellaghy	0-09
Magherafelt	1-08
Lavey	0-09
Swatragh	0-13
Banagher	2-03
Loup	0-21
Dungiven	1-11
Coleraine	3-10
Claudy	1-14

Quarter-finals
Slaughtneil	0-15
Glen	0-12
Ballinderry	2-12
Ballinascreen	2-09
Magherafelt	1-11
Swatragh	0-10
Loup	0-16
Coleraine	1-08

Semi-finals
Slaughtneil	3-15
Ballinderry	1-05
Magherafelt	0-14
Loup	1-10

Final
Slaughtneil	0-11
Magherafelt	1-04

== First Knockout Round ==
First Knockout Round draw took place on Monday 24 August. Group ranking was used to decide the draw – 1v4 and 2v3.

5 September 2020 First round	Coleraine	3-10 – 1-14	Claudy	Dungiven
2pm
	Gls: Colm McGoldrick 2-6, 2-0p, 3f; Barry Daly 1-0; Dara Mooney 0-2; Aidan McGonigle 0-1; Ciaran McGoldrick 0-1		Gls: Oran Armstrong 0-4, 3f; Eoin McGahon 0-2; Shea Kerrigan 0-2, 1f; Liam Connolly 0-2; Shea Dalton 0-2; Aaron Donaghy, Conor Gormley 0-1 each	Referee: Barry Cassidy

5 September 2020 First round	Newbridge	1-15 – 2-18 (AET)	Ballinderry	Loup
4pm
	Gls: Conor McAteer 0-6, 2f; Conor Doherty 1-1; Mark McGrogan 0-3, 1f; Peter McGrogan 0-2; Nathan Rocks, Jude Diamond, Conor McGrogan All 0-1 each		Gls: Ryan Bell 1-3, 2f; Conor O'Neill 0-6, 3f; Oisin Mullan 1-1; Sean Graham 0-1f; Gareth McKinless, Ray Wilkinson, Conor Nevin, Matt Quinn, Declan Bell, Oisin Duffin, Caolan Mallaghan All 0-1 each	Referee: JJ Cleary

5 September 2020 First round	Glen	3-20 – 1-10	Kilrea	Glenullin
4pm
	Gls: Alex Doherty 1-4; Conleth McGuckin 1-4; Paul Gunning 0-5, 3f; Emmett Bradley 1-2, 1 '45; Danny Tallon 0-2, 1f; Ciaran McFaul, Jack Doherty, Conor Carville All 0-1		Gls: Paddy Quigg 1-3; James Kielt 0-4, 1f; Daithi McLaughlin 0-2, 1f; PJ McAleese 0-1	Referee: Declan O'Connor

5 September 2020 First round	Ballinascreen	1-12 – 0-09	Bellaghy	Celtic Park
6pm
	Gls: Ryan Doyle 1-1; Shane Mulgrew 0-3, 2f; Benny Heron 0-3, 2f; Carlus McWilliams, JP Devlin. Philip Bradley, Niall Doyle, Ruairi McWilliams All 0-1		Gls: Ruairi McElwee 0-4, 1m, 1f; Chrissy Downey 0-2; Declan Cassidy 0-1, Kealan Friel, Lorcan Spiers All 0-1	Referee: Damien Harkin

6 September 2020 First round	Slaughtneil	3-20 – 0-08	Foreglen	Castledawson
1pm
	Gls: Shane McGuigan 2-08, 3f; Chris Bradley 1-6, 1f; Brian Cassidy 0-3; Chrissy McKaigue, Sean Cassidy, Meehaul McGrath, Francis McEldowney, Sean Cassidy All 0-1.		Gls: Kevin O'Connor 0-6, 5f; Mark McCormick 0-2, 1f	Referee: Mark McGeehan

6 September 2020 First round	Loup	0-21 – 1-11	Dungiven	Glen
3pm
	Gls: Anthony O'Neill 0-8, 6f; Caolin Devlin 0-4, 3f; Paddy Coney 0-3; Ciaran Devlin 0-2; Brian Doyle 0-1; Jason Rocks 0-1; Thomas Mallon 0-1f; Paul McVey		Gls: Fionntan Murphy 0-5, 4f; Richie Mullan 0-4f; Sean McKeever 1-0p; Daire McKeever 0-1	Referee: Richie Donoghue

6 September 2020 First round	Swatragh	0-13 – 2-03	Banagher	Ballinascreen
3pm
	Gls: James Kearney 0-4f; Jude McAtamney 0-3, 1f; Francis Kearney 0-3, 1f; Oisin McWilliams 0-1; Conor McAtamney 0-1		Gls: Tiarnan Moore 1-1; Ciaran Lynch 1-1; Pauric McCloskey 0-1	Referee: Brendan Quinn

6 September 2020 First round	Magherafelt	1-08 – 0-09	Lavey	Celtic Park
6pm
	Gls: Ryan Ferris 1-0; Cormac Murphy 0-2; Shane Heavron 0-2f; Danny Heavron 0-1f; Emmett McGuckin, Niall Higgins, Patrick McLarnon All 0-1 each		Gls: Cailean O'Boyle 0-6, 4f, 1m; Niall Toner 0-2; Anthony McGurk	Referee: Dan Mullan

Additions and corrections required for scorers.

== Quarter-finals ==
Quarter-final Draw took place after the Magherafelt v Lavey match.

19 September 2020 Q-Final	Magherafelt	1-11 – 0-10	Swatragh	Bellaghy
2.00pm
	Gls: Shane Heavron 1-5, 1-0p, 2f; Danny Heavron 0-1f; Emmett McGuckin, Cormac Murphy, Niall Higgins, Conor McCluskey, Ryan Ferris All 0-1		Gls: James Kearney 0-3f; Francis Kearney 0-3, 2f; Oisin McWilliams 0-2; Jude McAtamney 0-1'45; Mickey Friel 0-1m	Referee: D Harkin

19 September 2020 Q-Final	Ballinascreen	2-09 – 2-12	Ballinderry	Celtic Park
5.30pm
	Gls: JP Devlin 1-2; Ruairi McWilliams 1-0; Noel Rafferty 0-2; Shane Mulgrew 0-2; Benny Heron 0-2, 1'45; Philly Bradley 0-1		Gls: Sean Graham 1-3; Conor O'Neill 1-1; Ryan Bell 0-4, 1f; Conor Nevin 0-2; Gareth McKinless 0-1	Referee: Alan Nash

20 September 2020 Q-Final	Coleraine	1-08 – 0-16	Loup	Ballinascreen
1.00pm
	Gls: Colm McGoldrick 1-3, 1f; Dara Mooney 0-3, 2f; Liam McGoldrick 0-1'45, Liam Ferris 0-1		Gls: Caolin Devlin 0-8, 5f; Anthony O'Neill 0-5, 4f; Paul McVey 0-2; Brian Doyle 0-1	Referee: Declan O'Connor

20 September 2020 Q-Final	Slaughtneil	0-15 – 0-12	Glen	Celtic Park
4.30pm
	Gls: Shane McGuigan 0-9, 2f; Chrissy Bradley 0-3, 1f; Paul McNeil, Brian Cassidy & Keelan Feeney All 0-1 each		Gls: Danny Tallon 0-4, 3f; Alex Doherty 0-3; Emmett Bradley 0-1f; Conor Carville, Jack Doherty, Ciaran McFaul, Cathal Mullholland All 0-1 each	Referee: Barry Cassidy

== Semi-finals ==
The draw was made after the Slaughtneil v Glen quarter-final

26 September 2020 Semi-final	Loup	1-10 – 0-14	Magherafelt	Bellaghy
5.30pm
	Gls: Ciaran Devlin 1-2; Anthony O'Neill 0-2f; Mark Devlin 0-2, 1m; Caolin Devlin 0-1f; Thomas Mallon 0-1f; Jason Rocks 0-1; Paddy Coney 0-1		Gls: Shane Heavron 0-6, 4f; Danny Heavron 0-3, 1f; Conor Kearns 0-2; Emmett McGuckin, Cormac Murphy, Guiseppi Lupari All 0-1 each	Referee: JJ Cleary

27 September 2020 Semi-final	Slaughtneil	3-15 – 1-05	Ballinderry	Bellaghy
5.00pm
	Gls: Chrissy Bradley 1-4, 2f; Shane McGuigan 0-5, 1f; Sean Cassidy 1-1; Chrissy McKaigue 0-3; Brian Cassidy 0-2, Paul McNeill 1-0		Gls: Sean Graham 1p-1f; Ryan Bell 0-2f; Conor O'Neill & Shea Coleman 0-1 each

== Final ==
4 October 2020 Final	Slaughtneil	0-11 – 1-04	Magherafelt	Bellaghy
4:30 pm
	Gls: Chrissy Bradley 0-3f; Chrissy McKaigue 0-2; Shane McGuigan 0-2, 1f; Conor McAllister, Francis McEldowney, Brendan Rodgers, Ronan Bradley All 0-1 each		Gls: Jared Monaghan 1-0; Conor Kearns 0-2; Conor McCluskey 0-1; Shane Heavron 0-1f	Referee: Barry Cassidy; Attendance: 400 (?)

== Top Scorer ==
Semi-final Completed.

Rank	Player	Club	Group Stage	First round	Quarter-final	Semi-final	Final	Total
1	Shane McGuigan	Slaughtneil	2-23 (29)	2-08 (14)	0-09 (9)	0-05 (5)	0-02 (2)	4-47 (59)
2	Anthony O'Neill	Loup	3-13 (22)	0-08 (8)	0-05 (5)	0-02 (2)	N/A	3-28 (37)
3	Ryan Bell	Ballinderry	2-16 (22)	1-03 (6)	0-05 (5)	0-02 (2)	N/A	3-26 (35)
3	Shane Heavron	Magherafelt	0-13 (13)	0-02 (2)	1-05 (8)	0-06 (6)	0-01 (1)	1-27 (30)
4	Colm McGoldrick	Coleraine	2-05 (11)	2-06 (12)	1-03 (6)	N/A	N/A	5-14 (29)
5	Kevin O'Connor	Foreglen	2-11 (17)	0-07 (7)	N/A	N/A	N/A	2-18 (24)
