= Éamonn Burns =

Derry Gaelic footballer

Personal information
- Native name: Éamonn Ó Broin (Irish)
- Born: 24 January 1972 (age 54) Derry, Northern Ireland
- Occupation: PE teacher
- Height: 1.85 m (6 ft 1 in)

Sport
- Sport: Gaelic football
- Position: Left Half Forward
Club
- Years: Club
- 1989–2006: Ballinascreen
College
- Years: College
- Queen's University Belfast
College titles
- Sigerson titles: 1
Inter-county
- Years: County
- 1991–2002: Derry
Inter-county titles
- Ulster titles: 2
- All-Irelands: 1
- NFL: 4
- All Stars: 0

Éamonn Burns (born 24 January 1972) is a Gaelic footballer who played for Ballinascreen and the Derry county team in the 1990s and early 2000s. He was part of Derry's first ever All-Ireland Senior Football Championship winning side in 1993 and also won two Ulster Senior Football Championships and four National League titles. He also had a distinguished under-age career with the county - winning Ulster Under 21, Ulster Minor and All-Ireland Minor Championship medals. Burns still plays club football with St Colm's Ballinascreen.

He usually plays in the half forward line. Burns had massive promise at underage level, and won a vast range of honours by the time he was 21, however some feel he never reached his true potential on the inter-county stage. He was also hampered by injury throughout his career.

== Personal life ==
Burns went to secondary school at St Patrick's College, Maghera. Later he attended St Mary's University College in Belfast and Queen's University Belfast. Burns teaches physical education at St Columb's College in Derry.

== Playing career ==
=== Club ===
1990 was Burns's first year in the Ballinascreen Senior panel and they reached that year's Derry Senior Football Championship final, where they were beaten by Lavey. He was top-scorer in that year's Championship. Screen reached the final again two years later but once again Lavey came out victorious. Burns was again top scorer in the Championship. In 1994 Burns and Screen were beat in another Derry Championship final, this time to Bellaghy. They did however win the Derry Senior Football League that year. He again finished the Championship's top scorer in 1996. Ballinascreen won the Derry League Division 2 title in 2008. The club also won the 2009 Ulster Senior Club Football League.

Burns was in the United States for a short period the early 1990s and while there played with St. Columbkille's GFC, Boston. He along with fellow Derry man Dermot McNicholl helped the club win a Boston Senior Football Championship in 1991.

=== Inter-county ===
Burns was known as one of Derry's best ever underage players. He was part of the successful Derry Minor team that won the 1989 Ulster Minor and All-Ireland Minor Championships, beating Armagh and Offaly in the respective finals. Burns was part of the Derry Minor team again the following year, where they successfully defended their Ulster title, beating Down in the final. They were however beaten in the subsequent All-Ireland semi-final. With the Derry Under 21 team he won the Ulster Under 21 Championship in 1993, beating Down in the decider.

By that stage he was already part of the Derry Senior team, having made his debut in 1991. Burns got a groin injury against Down in 1991 and it meant he missed a lot of football that year and the next. The injury was somewhat of a mystery and nobody could diagnose it. Derry exited the 1991 Ulster Senior Football Championship to Down after a replay, who went on to win that year's All-Ireland Senior Football Championship. Burns was on the bench when Derry beat Tyrone in the 1992 National League final. They reached the Ulster Championship final later that year, but lost out to Donegal. Injury meant he only played a few minutes in that year's Championship - against Monaghan.

The injury was finally diagnosed in March 1993 as a small hernia and an operation meant he was fit for the Championship campaign. In 1993 Derry won the Ulster Championship, beating Donegal in the decider. Derry defeated Dublin in a classic All-Ireland semi-final, before beating Cork in the All-Ireland final, in which Burns made a substitute appearance. The success was Derry's first All-Ireland Senior Football Championship title.

Derry were knocked out the following year by Down in the first round of the Ulster Championship. The game is regarded as one of the best matches of all time. In 1995 Burns and Derry defeated Donegal in the National League final. They defended the title the following year, with victory over the same opposition in the decider. Tyrone knocked Derry out of the Championship in both 1995 and 1996. Derry reached the Ulster final in 1997 but were beaten by Cavan. In 1998 Derry again competed in the National League final, but were beaten by Offaly. Later that year though, Derry beat Donegal in the Ulster Championship final. They met Galway in the All-Ireland semi-final, but were defeated. The following year Armagh knocked Derry out of the Championship.

Burns won a fourth National League medal in 2000, with Derry beating Meath in the final. Derry reached that year's Ulster final, but were beaten by Armagh. Derry lost at the semi-final stage of the 2001 Ulster Championship, but nonetheless reached the All-Ireland semi-final through the Qualifiers (which had been introduced that year), where they once again faced Galway. Derry again lost to Galway. Burns made his last Derry appearance in a National League game against Fermanagh in 2002. That year Derry were beaten by Tyrone in the third round of the Qualifiers.

=== School/college ===
Burns won two consecutive MacRory and Hogan Cups with St. Pat's Maghera in 1989 and 1990. He was captain of the side in 1990. Burns won the Sigerson Cup with Queen's University Belfast in 1993. He could not play in the final due to injury, but was on the panel. He also won the Ryan Cup with QUB.

== Management career ==
Burns manages some school football teams at St. Columb's College in Derry City. His main success is guiding the school to victory in the 2002 MacLarnon Cup, the only in the school's history. This was Burns's first major trophy as a manager. The college have not repeated the 2002 success. Most recently they lost out in the 2008 decider to St. Mary's CBS, Belfast by two points.

== 2014 attack ==
Burns fractured his face and required surgery when he was assaulted at West End, Main Street, Buncrana, on 23 February 2014.

== Playing honours ==
=== Club ===
- Ulster Senior Club Football League:
  - Winner (1): 2009
- Derry Senior Football Championship:
  - Runner up: 1990, 1992, 1994
- Derry Senior Football League:
  - Winner (1): 1994
- Boston Senior Football Championship:
  - Winner (1): 1991

=== Inter-county ===
==== Senior ====
- All-Ireland Senior Football Championship:
  - Winner (1): 1993
- National Football League:
  - Winner (4): 1992, 1995, 1996, 2000
  - Runner-up: 1998
- Ulster Senior Football Championship:
  - Winner (2): 1993, 1998
  - Runner up: 1992, 1997, 2000

==== Under-21 ====
- Ulster Under-21 Football Championship:
  - Winner (1): 1993

==== Minor ====
- All-Ireland Minor Football Championship:
  - Winner (1): 1989
- Ulster Minor Football Championship:
  - Winner (2): 1989, 1990

=== School/college ===
- Sigerson Cup:
  - Winner (1): 1993
- Ryan Cup:
  - Winner (1): 199x
- Hogan Cup:
  - Winner (2): 1989, 1990
- MacRory Cup:
  - Winner (2): 1989, 1990

=== Individual ===
- All-Time Derry Senior Football Team - Left corner forward
- Derry Senior Football Championship top-scorer: 1990, 1992, 1996

== Coaching honours ==
=== School/college ===
- MacLarnon Cup:
  - Winner (1): 2002

== Soccer career ==
Burns also plays association football. Teams he played for include Limavady United and Omagh Town. He currently plays for Draperstown Celtic. In the 2007/08 season he scored the goal that ultimately won the club the Northern Ireland Intermediate League title for the first time in their history.
