= Derry Senior Football Championship =

Gaelic football competition

- Current season or competition: 2026 Derry Senior Football Championship
- Irish: Craobh Sinsear Peile Dhoire
- Founded: 1907
- Trophy: John McLaughlin Cup
- Title holders: Magherafelt (7th title)
- Most titles: Bellaghy (21 titles)
- Sponsors: O'Neills

The Derry Senior Football Championship is an annual Gaelic football competition contested by the top sixteen Derry GAA clubs. The winners receive the John McLaughlin Cup and qualify to represent Derry in the Ulster Senior Club Football Championship.

Magherafelt are current winners, having defeated Newbridge in the 2026 final.

== History ==
Bellaghy have won the competition more than any other club with 21 titles. Bellaghy's Tom Scullion has more senior football championship medals than anyone in Derry, winning 12 medals between 1956 and 1971.

Bellaghy and Slaughtneil are the only teams to have won four consecutive titles. As well as the four-in-a-row, Bellaghy have also won three consecutive titles on two other separate occasions. Ballinderry have also won three consecutive titles on two separate occasions.

== Format ==
=== Current format ===
In 2016, the championship reverted to its traditional knock-out format. All fixtures are determined by open-draw and are played at neutral venues. The majority of games are played at Owenbeg, near Dungiven. The final is usually played at Celtic Park, Derry.

=== Historical formats ===
Before 1958, three regional tournaments were played to determine the Derry Senior Football Championship finalists - the South Derry Senior Football Championship, the North Derry Senior Football Championship and the Derry City Senior Football Championship. Of the three winners, one received a bye to the final (in alternating years) and the other two played a semi-final to determine who qualified for the Derry Senior Football Championship final.

From 1958 to 2006 the championship took the form of an open-draw knock-out.

From 2007 to 2008 the championship was altered to include a round-robin group stage with the 16 teams divided into four groups. Each club in a group played each other once with the top two in each group advancing to the quarter-finals. From the quarter-finals onwards the competition was knock-out.

In 2009 a "backdoor" system was introduced -

- The 16 clubs all played in the first round.
- In the second round winners section the eight winning teams from round one played against each other with the four winners going straight into the quarter-finals. In the second round losers section the eight beaten teams from round one played against each other.
- In round three (also referred to as the quarter-final qualifiers) the four beaten teams from the round two winners section played the four winning teams from the round two losers section.
- In the quarter-finals the four teams who won their first two matches in rounds one and two played the four winners of round three.
- The quarter-finals, semi-finals and final were knock-out.

== Trophies ==
The cup for the winners of the Derry Senior Football Championship is named after John McLaughlin, a former leading official in Derry GAA. He was a native of Inishowen in County Donegal, having been born in Fahan. He was for a long time chairman of the North Derry Board and he was elected chairman of the County Board in about 1943 or 1944 in succession to Paddy Larkin, a post he held until his death in 1961. The County Board decided to purchase a new cup and present it to the winners of the Senior Championship in the following year. In 1989 the cup was replaced, but it is still called the John McLaughlin Cup.

- Since 1988 the player who has scored the most in that year's championship is presented with a trophy.
- Since 1989 the man of the match in the final is also presented with a trophy.

== Finals listed by year ==
Ulster Finalists
Also won the Ulster Competition in the same season
Also won the Ulster and All-Ireland Competitions in the same season

Year	Winner	Score	Runners-up	Score	Match report (final)	Venue	Referee	Man of the match	Winning captain	Championship top scorer
1907	Éire Óg, Derry					Unknown				
1908	No competition									
1909	No competition									
1910	No competition									
1911	No competition									
1912	No competition									
1913	No competition									
1914	Clann Chonail	1-04	Emmetts	1-02		Celtic Park				
1915	No competition									
1916	Sarsfield's					Celtic Park				
1917	St Patrick's	beat	Glenkeen			Celtic Park				
1918	Emmet's					Celtic Park				
1919	No competition									
1920	No competition									
1921	Derry Guilds	2-01	St Patrick's	0-02		Brandywell				
1922	No competition									
1923	No competition									
1924	No competition									
1925	No competition									
1926	No competition									
1927	Ballinderry	0-03	Glenullin	0-08	(Abandoned)	Magherafelt	J McKenna			
1928	Glenullin									
1929	No competition									
1930	Buncrana	2-04	St Patrick's	0-05						
1931	Burt	2-04	Wolfe Tones	0-01		Brandywell			John Kavanagh	
1932	No competition									
1933	No competition									
1934	Ballinascreen				NO FINAL					
1935	Ballinascreen				NO FINAL					
1936	An Lúb	beat	Park							
1937	Newbridge	beat	St Patrick's			Brandywell				
1938	Lavey	1-03	Pearses	0-03		Dungiven				
1939	Magherafelt	5-07	Dungiven	1-02		Ballinascreen	George Nash			
1940	Newbridge	beat	Glenullin							
1941	Ballinascreen	2-05	O'Connor's Limavady	1-01						
1942	Magherafelt	w/o	Glenullin			Dungiven	Paddy Larkin			
1943	Lavey	3-07	Faughanvale	0-03		Magherafelt				
1944	Lavey	1-05	Mitchels	0-00		Celtic Park				
1945	Newbridge	3-06	Dungiven	0-03		Claudy Green				
1946	Magherafelt	7-07	Dolans	2-06		Celtic Park	Tommy Farran			
1947	Dungiven	2-08	Lavey	2-03		Magherafelt				
1948	Newbridge	1-06	Dungiven	0-07		Claudy Green				
1949	Magherafelt	2-08	Eoghan Ruadh	0-06		Celtic Park	Harry Owens			
1950	Newbridge	3-06	Dungiven	0-06		Ballinascreen				
1951	Dungiven	4-03	Bellaghy	1-09		Cashel Green				
1952	Éire Óg, Derry	1-02	Desertmartin	1-00		Celtic Park				
1953	Desertmartin	4-09	Ballerin	0-02		Magherafelt				
1954	Lavey	1-10	Banagher	1-05		Dungiven			Colm Mulholland	
1955	Newbridge	2-09	Dolans	1-04		Celtic Park				
1956	Bellaghy	2-09	Drum	1-01		Magherafelt				
1957	Ballerin	3-08	Ballymaguigan	2-06		Dungiven	Barry McFadden			
1958	Bellaghy	3-06	Ballymaguigan	0-07		Ballinascreen			Peter Kearney	
1959	Bellaghy	3-04	Desertmartin	1-03		Ballinascreen			Peter Kearney	
1960	Bellaghy	1-05	Dungiven	2-01		Ballinascreen			Gerry McCann	
1961	Bellaghy	w/o	Ballymaguigan						Gerry McCann	
1962	Ballymaguigan	2-10 0-06	Castledawson	1-05 1-03*		Magherafelt	Jim McGuigan / Jim Lynn		Denis McKeever	
1963	Bellaghy	2-12	Newbridge	2-08		Magherafelt	Jim McGuigan		Tom Scullion	
1964	Bellaghy	2-09	Ballerin	0-10		Magherafelt	Barry McFadden		Tom Scullion	
1965	Bellaghy	3-11	Ballerin	0-10		Dungiven	Barry McFadden		Tom Scullion	
1966	Newbridge	2-10	Dungiven	0-03		Magherafelt			Mickey Gribben	
1967	Newbridge	0-11	Magherafelt	1-07		Ballinascreen			Brian Devlin	
1968	Bellaghy	2-03	Newbridge	0-07		Magherafelt			Tom Scullion	
1969	Bellaghy	1-09	Slaughtneil	0-08		Magherafelt			Tom Quinn	
1970	Newbridge	3-08	Bellaghy	0-13		Magherafelt			Patsy McLarnon	
1971	Bellaghy	2-12	Lavey	0-05		Magherafelt			Larry Diamond	
1972	Bellaghy	0-14	Ballerin	1-08		Dungiven	Tom McFeely		Larry Diamond	
1973	Ballinascreen	2-14	Bellaghy	1-10		Magherafelt	Dermot Mullan		Tommy McKenna	
1974	Ballinderry	1-04	Banagher	1-03		Ballerin	Willie Harkin		Sean McGuckin	
1975	Bellaghy	1-09 1-05	Magherafelt	0-03 0-08*		Ballinascreen	Patsy Mulholland		Frankie O'Loane	
1976	Ballerin	0-09	Dungiven	0-03		Magherafelt	Murty Higgins		Eamon Moloney	
1977	Lavey	1-18	Ballinderry Shamrocks	0-07		Magherafelt	Seamus Mullan		Niall Hurley	
1978	Magherafelt	1-04	Banagher	1-03		Swatragh	Louis Downey		Gerry O'Loughlin	
1979	Bellaghy	0-14 1-05	Magherafelt	0-03 0-08*		Ballinascreen	Bobby Mullan		Hugh McGoldrick	
1980	Ballinderry	0-07 0-11	Lavey	0-04 1-08*		Magherafelt / Ballinascreen	Patsy Mulholland		Sean McIvor	
1981	Ballinderry	0-07	Banagher	0-05		Ballerin	Murty Higgins		Pat McGuckin	
1982	Ballinderry	0-07	Dungiven	0-05		Swatragh	Patsy Mulholland		Dessie Rocks	
1983	Dungiven	1-04	Magherafelt	1-03		Ballinascreen	Sean Bradley		Colm McGuigan	
1984	Dungiven	0-09	Castledawson	0-08		Greenlough	Murty Higgins		Plunkett Murphy	
1985	Glenullin	1-09	Ballinderry Shamrocks	1-05		Ballinascreen	John Diamond		Dermot McNicholl	
1986	Bellaghy	3-05	Ballinderry	1-06		Ballinascreen	Anthony O'Neill		Tommy Doherty	
1987	Dungiven				NO FINAL				Liam McElhinney	
1988	Lavey	0-11	Newbridge	0-06		Glen	Kevin Cassidy		Henry Downey	Hugh Martin McGurk (1-19)
1989	Newbridge	3-04	Castledawson	0-09		Ballinascreen	Billy McKeever	Liam Devlin	Damian Barton	Fergal Kearney (1-14)
1990	Lavey	3-14	Ballinascreen	1-07		Magherafelt	F. Connolly	Brian McCormick	Johnny McGurk	Eamonn Burns (0-24)
1991	Dungiven	3-05	Newbridge	0-04		Ballinascreen	Noel McGurk	Shane Heavern	Plunkett Murphy	Damian Cassidy (4-6)
1992	Lavey	2-06	Ballinascreen	0-09		Bellaghy	Owen Roe O'Neill	Seamus Downey	Anthony Scullion	Éamonn Burns (2-17)
1993	Lavey	3-05	Swatragh	0-08		Glenullin	Matt Armstrong	Colm McGurk	Anthony Scullion	Anthony Tohill (2-26)
1994	Bellaghy	2-10	Ballinascreen	0-08		Swatragh	Phonsey Guyler	Damian Cassidy	Danny Quinn	Karl Diamond (0-24)
1995	Ballinderry	1-08	Bellaghy	0-08		Glen	Anthony O'Neill	Gerard Cassidy & Adrian McGuckin	Raymond Bell	Karl Diamond (1-18)
1996	Bellaghy	2-11	Dungiven	0-07	The Irish News	Celtic Park	PJ Cassidy	David O'Neill	Gareth Doherty	Éamonn Burns (2-24)
1997	Dungiven	2-09	Castledawson	0-09		Celtic Park	Dessie Kearney	Joe Brolly	Emmett McKeever	Joe Brolly (1-25)
1998	Bellaghy	1-13	Lavey	2-04		Celtic Park	Anthony O'Neill	Gavin Diamond	Kevin O'Neill	Gavin Diamond (1-21)
1999	Bellaghy	1-11	Ballinderry	0-11		Ballinascreen	Dessie Kearney	Damian Cassidy	Karl Diamond	Gerard Cassidy (3-22)
2000	Bellaghy	0-09	Ballinderry	0-08		Celtic Park	Aidan McAlynn	Gareth Doherty	Ciaran McNally	Seanie McGuckin (2-28)
2001	Ballinderry	1-09	Bellaghy	0-11		Glen	Declan O'Connor	Gerard Cassidy	Adrian McGuckin	Gerard Cassidy & Gavin Diamond (1-26)
2002	Ballinderry	1-11	An Lúb	0-06		Celtic Park		Conleith Gilligan	Gerard Cassidy	Gerard Cassidy (0-26)
2003	An Lúb	0-11	Ballinderry	0-07		Celtic Park		Padraig O'Kane	Johnny McBride	Jim Kelly (1-15)
2004	Slaughtneil	1-08	Bellaghy	0-09		Glen	T O'Kane	Padrig Kelly	Shane Kelly	Jim Kelly (3-12)
2005	Bellaghy	2-07	An Lúb	1-06		Celtic Park	S McGuigan	Joe Diver	Joe Cassidy	Joe Cassidy (0-21)
2006	Ballinderry	2-11	An Lúb	0-09		Celtic Park	JJ Cleary	Conleith Gilligan	Conleith Gilligan	Conleith Gilligan & Paddy Bradley (0-18)
2007	Glenullin	0-10 1-09	Bellaghy	1-06 1-09*		Celtic Park Celtic Park	B Toland D O'Connor	Gerard O'Kane	Paddy Bradley	Conleith Gilligan (1-26)
2008	Ballinderry	0-10	Slaughtneil	0-08	BBC Sport Irish Independent	Celtic Park	B Toland	Raymond Wilkinson	Enda Muldoon	Paul Bradley
2009	An Lúb	1-08	Dungiven	0-10		Celtic Park	B Toland	Joe O'Kane	Joe O'Kane	Cathal Grieve
2010	Eoghan Rua, Coleraine	2-11	Ballinderry	0-15		Celtic Park	B Cassidy	Declan Mullan	Richard Carey	Cailen O'Boyle
2011	Ballinderry	2-05	Kilrea	0-06	BBC Sport,	Celtic Park	D Loughrey	Martin Harney	Kevin McGuckin	James Kielt
2012	Ballinderry	1-10	Slaughtneil	0-10		Celtic Park	S Hamill	Enda Muldoon	Ryan Scott	Christopher Bradley
2013	Ballinderry	3-10	Ballinascreen	2-07		Celtic Park	B Cassidy	Coilin Devlin	Conor Nevin	Benny Heron
2014	Slaughtneil	1-08	Ballinderry	0-09		Celtic Park	A Campbell	Patsy Bradley	Francis McEldowney	
2015	Slaughtneil	1-07	Eoghan Rua, Coleraine	0-09		Celtic Park	D O'Neill	Paul Bradley	Francis McEldowney	
2016	Slaughtneil	2-11	An Lúb	0-06		Celtic Park	Benny Quinn	Padraig Cassidy	Francis McEldowney	Shane McGuigan (2-15)
2017	Slaughtneil	4-12	Ballinascreen	1-11		Celtic Park	Dan Mullan	Shane McGuigan	Patsy Bradley	Shane McGuigan (3-15)
2018	Eoghan Rua, Coleraine	1-12	Lavey	0-12	Highlights	Celtic Park	Damien Harkin	Liam McGoldrick	Colm McGoldrick	Colm McGoldrick
2019	Magherafelt	0-12	Glen	0-11	BBC Derry Now	Celtic Park	JJ Cleary	Emmett McGuckin	Danny Heavron	Shane Heavron (0-20)
2020	Slaughtneil	0-11	Magherafelt	1-04	BBC	Bellaghy	Barry Cassidy	Chrissy McKaigue	Karl McKaigue / Shane McGuigan	Shane McGuigan (4-47)
2021	Glen	1-13	Slaughtneil	0-07	BBC	Celtic Park	S Curran	Ciaran McFaul	Conor Carville	Shane McGuigan
2022	Glen	1-12	Slaughtneil	0-07	RTE	Celtic Park	G Hegarty		Conor Carville	Shane McGuigan
2023	Glen	1-13	Magherafelt	0-07	Derry Journal	Celtic Park	Benny Quinn		Conor Carville	
2024	Newbridge	1-12	Glen	2-08	BBC	Celtic Park	Martin McErlean	Conor Doherty	Conor McAteer	Oisin Doherty (0-33) & Shane McGuigan (2-27)
2025	Newbridge	1-17	Magherafelt	1-15	BBC	Celtic Park	Richie Donohue	Conor McGrogan	Conor McAteer	Shane Heavron (4-24) & Shane McGuigan (2-30)
2026	Magherafelt	3-17	Newbridge	0-20		Celtic Park	Ciaran Canney	Conor McCluskey	Conal Higgns	

|}

Notes

- 1907 - Éire Óg club is now defunct.
- 1938 - Pearse's was a Derry City club, now defunct.
- 1944 - Mitchel's was a Derry City club, now defunct.

== Wins listed by club ==
#	Club	Wins	Years won
1	Bellaghy	21	1956, 1958, 1959, 1960, 1961, 1963, 1964, 1965, 1968, 1969, 1971, 1972, 1975, 1979, 1986, 1994, 1996, 1998, 1999, 2000, 2005
2	Ballinderry	13	1927, 1974, 1980, 1981, 1982, 1995 2001, 2002, 2006, 2008; 2011, 2012, 2013
3	Newbridge	12	1937, 1940, 1945, 1948, 1950, 1955, 1966, 1967, 1970, 1989, 2024, 2025
4	Lavey	9	1938, 1943, 1944, 1954, 1977, 1988, 1990, 1992, 1993
5	Dungiven	7	1947 1951 1983 1984 1987 1991 1997
5	Magherafelt	7	1939, 1942, 1946, 1949, 1978, 2019, 2026
7	Slaughtneil	6	2004, 2014, 2015, 2016, 2017, 2020
8	Ballinascreen	4	1934, 1935, 1941, 1973
9	Glen	3	2021, 2022, 2023
9	Glenullin	3	1928, 1985, 2007
9	An Lúb	3	1936, 2003, 2009
12	Ballerin	2	1957, 1976
12	Eoghan Rua, Coleraine	2	2010, 2018
12	Éire Óg	2	1907, 1952
15	Ballymaguigan	1	1962
15	Desertmartin	1	1953
15	Clan Chonail	1	1914
15	Sarsfield’s*	1	1916
15	St Patrick’s	1	1917
15	Emmett’s	1	1918
15	Derry Guilds	1	1921
15	Buncrana	1	1930
15	Burt	1	1931

Notes

- 1914 Clan Chonail are a Donegal team.
- 1916 Sarsfield's are now defunct. They were a Derry City club, a fore-runner to the modern-day Doire Colmcille club.
- 1930 Buncrana are a Donegal team.
- 1931 Burt are a Donegal team.

== See also ==
- Derry club football competitions
