= St Pius X College, Magherafelt =

Coordinates: 54.750°N 6.615°W

Saint Pius X College

Location
- 59 Moneymore Road, Magherafelt, BT45 6HQ; Northern Ireland

Information
- Type: Secondary School
- Religious affiliation: Roman Catholic
- Established: 1964
- Local authority: Education Authority (North Eastern)
- Principal: Sean Doyle
- Staff: 80 approx.
- Gender: co-educational
- Age: 11 to 19
- Enrollment: 950
- Colour
- Website: www.stpiusxcollege.org

Saint Pius X College is a Roman Catholic co-educational secondary school in Magherafelt, County Londonderry, Northern Ireland.

== History ==
St Pius X Voluntary Intermediate School began in 1960 with the purchase of 6 acres (24,000 m^{2}) of land, at a cost of £5,000, by Canon Mark Quinn, parish priest of Magherafelt. The building of the school commenced in 1962 and opened for three hundred pupils in September 1964. The official opening by Cardinal Conway took place in June 1965. Edward Quinn, supported by the vice principal, Sister Immaculata Quinn, assumed the role of the school's first principal.

Initially the pupils pursued courses leading to the Junior Certificate examination level only. However, with the appointment of Mr. J. Murphy, who succeeded Mr. Quinn as principal in 1967, many new courses and programmes of study were soon on offer. Mr. Murphy retired in the year 1979. Sean O'Kane, who succeeded Murphy, was widely regarded as an innovative leader whose primary focus was the cultivation of a supportive culture which fostered the personal growth and enhanced the self-confidence of each member of the college community. At a time of immense educational and social change he actively engaged with a variety of initiatives and programmes culminating in the conferment of the Schools Curriculum Award in 1990.

On 25 October 1989, the school celebrated its Silver Jubilee with a Mass of Thanksgiving in The Church of The Assumption. Dean McLarnon was the chief celebrant on this memorable occasion. He was assisted by a number of local and visiting clergy, including the present chairperson, Canon O'Byrne (PPVF) who has been closely associated with the college since its inception. Opportunities to ensure that the school's students left as rounded citizens were embraced within the wide-ranging sporting and cultural activities offered. Much success was experienced including capturing the Rannafast, Corn na nÓg, Brock and Dalton cups, while the 1990 camogie team won the Ulster Colleges C competition.

The rapid growth in population in Mid-Ulster led to a huge increase in demand for places at the school and a 'mobile village' sprung up around the permanent buildings. It was not until May 1998, however, that approval was given for a major building and refurbishment programme at an initial costing of £12 million. With the arrival of the major contractor, F B. McKee in March 2000, the project began. O'Kane retired in 1999, handing the leadership over to Mr. F Devenny. Principal Devenny secured the full co-operation of both teaching and construction staff throughout the building programme thus ensuring the smooth running of the scheme.

During Devey's tenure as principal the highest ever level of GCSE success was achieved in 2003. The college was awarded Laureate Status in the Sharing Excellent Practice in ICT award, and in May 2003, and one of the teachers was awarded the BT Teaching Award for the Most Creative Use of ICT. The new building was completed in June 2003.

== Notable alumni ==
- Gary Coleman, Gaelic footballer
- Dermot Heaney, former Gaelic footballer
