= Tom Scullion =

Derry Gaelic footballer (1939–2021)

Personal information
- Native name: Tomás Ó Scolláin (Irish)
- Born: 1939 Bellaghy, County Londonderry, Northern Ireland
- Died: 12 February 2021 (aged 81) Bellaghy, County Londonderry, Northern Ireland
- Occupation: Primary school principal

Sport
- Sport: Gaelic football
- Position: Right wing-forward
Club
- Years: Club
- Bellaghy
Club titles
- Derry titles: 12
- Ulster titles: 2
- All-Ireland Titles: 1
College
- Years: College
- Queen's University Belfast
College titles
- Sigerson titles: 1
Inter-county
- Years: County
- Derry
Inter-county titles
- Ulster titles: 1
- All-Irelands: 0
- NFL: 0

Thomas Scullion (1939 – 12 February 2021) was an Irish Gaelic footballer, manager and administrator. Regarded as a "legend of club and county", he won Ulster Championships with the Derry senior football team as both a player and manager. Scullion has also been described as Derry's most decorated club player of all time, having won the All-Ireland Club Championship and 12 Derry County Championship titles with Bellaghy.

== Honours ==
=== Player ===
Queen's University Belfast

- Sigerson Cup; 1958

Bellaghy

- All-Ireland Senior Club Football Championship: 1971-72
- Ulster Senior Club Football Championship: 1968, 1971
- Derry Senior Football Championship: 1956, 1958, 1959, 1960, 1961, 1963, 1964, 1965, 1968, 1969, 1971, 1972

Derry

- Ulster Senior Football Championship: 1958

=== Manager ===
Derry

- Ulster Senior Football Championship: 1987
