= Francis McEldowney =

Dual player of Gaelic games and Derry Gaelic footballer

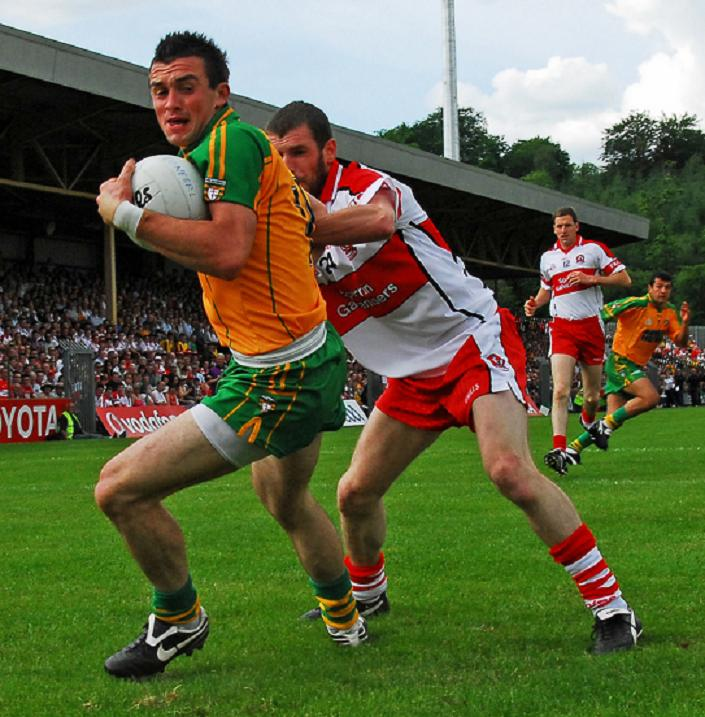

Personal information
- Native name: Proinsias Mac Giolla Domhnaigh (Irish)
- Born: 24 April 1981 (age 45) Derry, Northern Ireland
- Occupation: Plumber
- Height: 1.78 m (5 ft 10 in)

Sport
- Sport: Gaelic football
- Position: Left Corner Back
Club
- Years: Club
- 1999–: Slaughtneil
Club titles
	Football	Hurling
Derry titles	2	1
Ulster titles	1	
Inter-county
- Years: County
- 2004-2008: Derry
Inter-county titles
- NFL: 1

Francis McEldowney (born 24 April 1981) is a dual player of Gaelic games who plays Gaelic football for the Derry county team, with whom he won a National League title.

McEldowney plays his club football and hurling for Robert Emmet's Slaughtneil, with whom he won three Derry Senior Football Championship and Derry Senior Hurling Championship. His twin brother Fergal also played for Derry in the past.

== Playing career ==
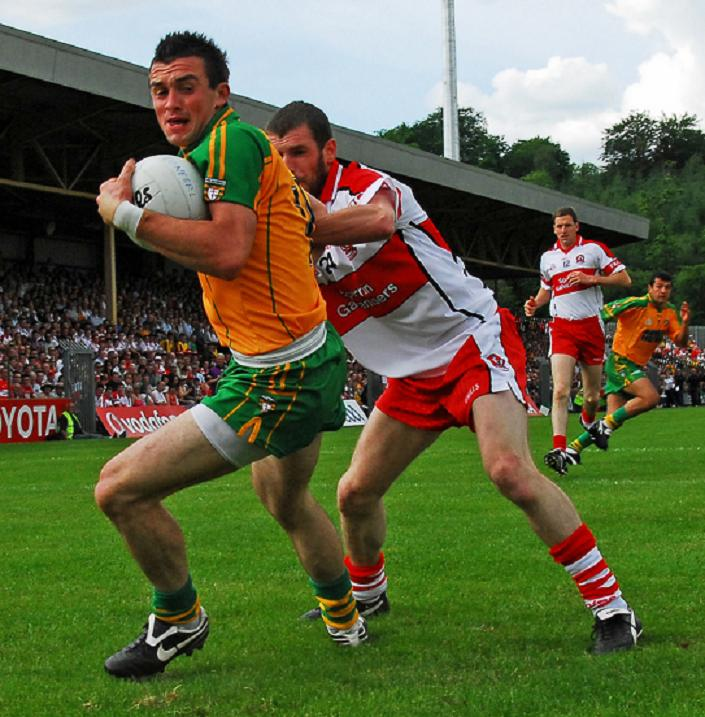
McEldowney (right) tackling Donegal's David Walsh in the 2008 Ulster Championship

=== Inter-county ===
2004 was McEldowney's debut year and was ever-present for Derry in that year's Championship.

He was part of the Derry team that won the 2008 National League where Derry beat Kerry in the final.

=== Club ===
McEldowney's underage honours include two Derry Minor Football Championship's and two Derry Minor Hurling Championship's. In 2000 he won a Derry Senior Hurling Championship with the club. They were also beaten in that year's Ulster Senior Club Hurling Championship final. In 2004 McEldowney was part of the first ever Slaughtneil side to win the Derry Senior Football Championship. Slaughtneil were beaten finalists in the competition in 2008.

== Honours ==
=== Football ===
Derry

- National Football League (1): 2008

Slaughtneil

- Ulster Senior Club Football Championship (3): 2014, 2016, 2017
- Derry Senior Football Championship (6): 2004, 2014, 2015, 2016, 2017, 2020
- Derry Senior Football League (1): 2001
- Derry Minor Football Championship (2): 1998, 1999

=== Hurling ===
Slaughtneil

- Derry Senior Hurling Championship (1): 2000
- Derry Minor Hurling Championship (2): 1998, 1999
