= Patsy McLarnon =

Gaelic footballer

Patsy McLarnon is an Irish former Gaelic footballer who played in the 1958 All-Ireland Final.
