= Newbridge GAC =

Derry-based Gaelic games club

Seán O'Leary's GAC Newbridge
- CLG Seán Ó Laoghaire Droichead Nua
- Founded: 1925
- County: Derry
- Nickname: The Bridge
- Colours: Green and white
- Grounds: Páirc Sheáin Uí Laoghaire
- Coordinates: 54°45′41.79″N 6°30′25.00″W

Playing kits
Standard colours

Senior Club Championships
	All Ireland	Ulster champions	Derry champions
Football:	-	-	12

Seán O'Leary's GAC Newbridge (Irish: CLG Seán Ó Laoghaire Droichead Nua) is a Gaelic Athletic Association club based in Newbridge, County Londonderry, Northern Ireland. The club is a member of Derry GAA and fields Gaelic football and camogie teams. Newbridge has won the Derry Senior Football Championship on twelve occasions.

Teams up to Under-12s play in South Derry league and championships, and those from U-14 upwards compete in All-Derry competitions.

== History ==
Gaelic games had been played on the western shores of Lough Neagh for decades before the founding of the club. Seán O'Leary's GAC Newbridge was established in 1925 and covered the Newbridge and Ballymaguigan areas, both in Ardtrea North parish. The U.S. Army built Toome airfield during the Second World War. This effectively split the parish in two, making it difficult for the Ballymaguigan-based players to travel to the pitch and a separate club, St Trea's GFC, was set up in Ballymaguigan in 1944.

== Gaelic football ==
Newbridge first won the Derry Senior Football Championship in 1937 and added further Senior Championship successes in 1940, 1945 and 1948. Success carried into the 1950s and the club won the Championship again in 1950 and 1955. With the emergence of the successful Bellaghy side of the late 1950s and early 1960s, it was 1966 before Newbridge added another Senior Championship, and won the competition again in 1967 and 1970. and in 1989 .After a 35 year gap they won the Derry Senior Football Championship in 2024 and retained it in 2025 .

Newbridge fields Gaelic football teams at U8, U10, U12, U14, U16, Minor, Reserve and Senior levels. In addition to winning the Derry Senior Championship twelve times, the club has won the Derry Intermediate Football Championship three times ( 2002, 2007 & 2017 ) . As of 2026, they are competing in the Derry Senior Championship and Division 1 of the Derry ACFL.

== Honours ==
- Derry Senior Football Championship (12): 1937, 1940, 1945, 1948, 1950, 1955, 1966, 1967, 1970, 1989, 2024, 2025
- Derry Senior Reserve Football Championship (2): 1987,1988
- Derry Intermediate Reserve Football Championship (1): 1999
- Dean Mcglinchey Cups (12): 1939, 1940, 1942, 1943, 1944, 1945, 1946, 1947, 1948, 1949, 1950, 1956

== Notable players ==
- Damian Barton - member of Derry's 1993 All-Ireland winning team
- Tommy Doherty - former Derry player and team selector 1989 Derry Championship
- Hugh Francis Gribben
- Owen Gribben
- Roddy Gribben - former Derry player and manager
- Patsy McLarnon - former Derry player
- John Murphy - won National Football League with Derry in 1947

== Camogie ==
The club also fields camogie teams across various ages.

== See also ==
- List of Gaelic games clubs in Derry
