= St. Patrick's GAC Loup =

Derry-based Gaelic games club

St. Patricks GAC, Loup
- Naomh Pádraig An Lúb CLG
- Founded: 1933
- County: Derry
- Nickname: An Lúb
- Colours: Green and White
- Grounds: The Meadows
- Coordinates: 54°42′07.13″N 6°35′21.51″W

Playing kits
Standard colours

Senior Club Championships
	All Ireland	Ulster champions	Derry champions
Football:	-	1	3
Hurling:	-	-	2

St. Patrick's GAC (Irish: CLG Naomh Pádraig An Lúb) is a Gaelic Athletic Association club based in The Loup in County Londonderry, Northern Ireland. It is a member of the Derry GAA.

The club's biggest success was winning the 2003 Ulster Senior Club Football Championship. They have also won the Derry Senior Football Championship three times.

== Hurling ==
After being suspended from football for two years, a hurling club, St Finbarr's, was started, winning back-to-back Derry Senior Hurling Championships in the 1960s, before being disbanded.

== History ==
St Patrick's Loup was formed in 1933 and won its first Derry Senior Championship three years later. Players on the team included Paddy Larkin, Fr Éamonn Devlin (who played for Armagh) and Peter Donaghy (played as goalkeeper for Derry). After disappearing from the top, they were a Junior side for many years, reaching the 1958/59? Derry Junior Football Championship final, where they lost to Glen.

In 1963 and 1964 St Finbarrs won the Derry Hurling Championship.

The current pitch was opened by Cardinal Tomás Ó Fiaich in 1981.

== Football titles ==
=== Senior ===
- Ulster Senior Club Football Championships: 1
  - 2003
- Derry Senior Football Championships: 3
  - 1936, 2003, 2009
- Derry Senior Football Leagues: 1
  - 2002
- Derry Intermediate Football Championships: 1
  - 1994
- Derry Intermediate Football Leagues: 1
  - 1994
- Derry Junior Football Championships: 3
  - 1949, 1984, 1989
- Derry Junior Football Leagues: 3
  - 1977, 1984, 1989

=== Minor ===
- Ulster Minor Club Football Championships: 2
  - 1993, 1995
- Derry Minor Football Championships: 2
  - 1993, 1995
- Derry Minor Football Leagues: 5
  - 1992, 1995, 2003, 2004, 2010
- South Derry Minor Football Championships: 1*
  - 2001
- South Derry Minor Football Leagues: 1*
  - 2001

== Hurling titles ==
=== Senior ===
- Derry Senior Hurling Championships: 2
  - 1963, 1964

(Won as St Finbarr's - a parish amalgamation.)

* Note: Some honours, particularly those marked with * may be incomplete lists. Please help complete the list by adding in any honours you know of.

== Well-known footballers ==
- Johnny McBride - First ever Loup player to captain the Derry Senior footballers.
- Paul McFlynn - Former Derry player.
- Diarmuid Ó Doibhlin - Former Derry County Board Chairman. Captained Derry Minors and St Patrick's Armagh MacRory Cup team in 1958/59?. Won a Derry Championship and League with Ballymaguigan in 1962.

== See also ==
- Derry Senior Football Championship
- Derry Senior Hurling Championship
- List of Gaelic games clubs in Derry
