= Magherafelt GAC =

Derry-based Gaelic games club

O'Donovan Rossa GAC Magherafelt
- CLG Ó Donnabháin Rosa Machaire Fíolta
- Founded: 1934
- County: Derry
- Nickname: Rossa
- Colours: Red and White
- Grounds: Rossa Park
- Coordinates: 54°45′53.50″N 6°35′08.69″W

Playing kits
Football

Senior Club Championships
	All Ireland	Ulster champions	Derry champions
Football:	-	-	7

O'Donovan Rossa GAC Magherafelt (Irish: CLG Ó Donnabháin Rosa Machaire Fíolta) is a Gaelic Athletic Association club based in Magherafelt, County Londonderry, Northern Ireland. The club is a member of Derry GAA and currently caters for Gaelic football, Camogie and Ladies' Gaelic football. The club is named after Irish patriot and revolutionary Jeremiah O'Donovan Rossa.

The club have won the Derry Senior Football Championship on seven occasions. Underage teams up to U-12s play in the South Derry GAA league and championships, from U-14 upwards teams compete in All-Derry competitions.

== History ==
O'Donovan Rossa GAC Magherafelt was established on 15 April 1934. The founding members were Pat McFlynn, Pat Keenan, Gerry Gallagher, Paddy Collins, John Walls, John Kearns and Charlie McFlynn.

Having recently read Patrick Pearse's graveside oration at Jeremiah O'Donovan Rossa's funeral, Pat McFlynn proposed the idea of naming the club after O'Donovan Rossa. His proposal was accepted and it was also decided that the club would play in red and white colours.

Magherafelt moved to its current ground, Rossa Park in 1941, having previously played at Bellvue Park and Millbrook Park. The club won its first Derry Senior Football Championship in 1939 and added four more in the 1940s. In 1978 after a gap of 29 years, the club won the Senior Championship for a sixth time.

== Rossa Park ==
The club's home ground is Rossa Park, located on the road between Magherafelt and Castledawson. In the past it was the main ground for Derry GAA inter-county matches, but this ended in the 1970s. Celtic Park in Derry City is now the main county ground.

== Football Titles ==
=== Senior ===
- Derry Senior Football Championship: 8
  - 1939, 1942, 1944, 1946, 1949, 1978, 2019, 2026
- Derry Senior League: 1
  - 2016
- Derry Junior Football Championship: 2
  - 1960, 1963

=== Minor ===
- Derry Minor Football Championship: 5
  - 1959, 1972, 1992, 2010,2021
- Hughes/McElwee Memorial Cup: 2
  - 2009, 2010

== Notable players ==
- Chuck Higgins
- Mickey Niblock
- Hugh Niblock

== See also ==
- Derry Senior Football Championship
- List of Gaelic games clubs in Derry
