= Derry club football competitions =

The following are club Gaelic football competitions run by the Derry County Board.

== Adult ==
=== Championships ===
==== Derry Senior Football Championship ====
The Derry Senior Football Championship is the most prestigious football competition in Derry. It has been running for over 100 years, and the winning team are awarded the Johnny McLaughlin Cup. The winners of the Derry Senior Championship qualify to represent Derry in the Ulster Senior Club Football Championship. Currently it is entered by the top 16 teams in Derry. Bellaghy have won the championship the most times, having won 21 titles since their first success in 1956.

==== Derry Intermediate Football Championship ====
The Derry Intermediate Football Championship is the second-tier Derry championship and is competed for by the Division 2 clubs. The trophy is named after John Bateson (19), James Sheridan (20) and Martin Lee (18), all members of the South Derry Brigade of the Provisional Irish Republican Army who died whilst priming a bomb in Magherafelt on 18 December 1971. All three men came from Ballymaguigan and played for the St. Trea's GFC Ballymaguigan. The winners of the Derry Intermediate Championship qualify to represent Derry in the Ulster Intermediate Club Football Championship. Craigbane have won the championship the most times, having won 7 titles since their first success in 1986.

==== Derry Junior Football Championship ====
The Derry Junior Football Championship is competed for between the Junior (third tier) Derry clubs. It has been running for over 50 years. The winners of the Derry Junior Championship represent Derry in the Ulster Junior Club Football Championship. Drum have won the championship the most times, having won six titles since their first success in 1973.

==== Derry Thirds Football Championship ====
The Derry Thirds Football Championship is competed for between the Derry clubs with a Thirds team (i.e. third choice team). It is a relatively new tournament.

=== Leagues ===
The league structure in Derry was recently re-organised and returned to the old system of three divisions - Division 1 (Senior League), Division 2 (Intermediate League) and Division 3 (Junior League).

==== Derry All-County Football League (ACFL) Division 1 ====
The Derry All-County Football League (ACFL) Division 1 (referred to as the H&A Mechanical Services ACFL Division 1 for sponsorship reasons) is a competition for the top sixteen senior teams in Derry.

Under the current regulations, teams play each another once (15 games each), with the top team winning the league. The bottom team is automatically relegated to the ACFL Division 2.

Derry Senior Football League Roll of honour (incomplete)

==== Derry All-County Football League (ACFL) Division 2 ====
The Derry All-County Football League (ACFL) Division 2 (currently known for sponsorship reasons as the H&A Mechanical Services ACFL Division 2) is the second-highest football league in Derry. It is entered by the fourteen intermediate teams in Derry

Under the current regulations, teams shall play one another once (13 games each), with the top team winning the league and being promoted to the ACFL Division 1, and the bottom team being relegated to the ACFL Division 3.

Derry Intermediate Football League Roll of honour (incomplete)

==== Derry All-County Football League (ACFL) Division 3 ====
The Derry All-County Football League (ACFL) Division 3 (currently known for sponsorship reasons as the H&A Mechanical Services ACFL Division 3) is the third-highest football league in Derry. It is entered by the top eight junior teams in Derry.

Under the current regulations, teams shall play one another twice (14 games each), with the top team winning the league and being promoted to the ACFL Division 2.

=== Other adult competitions ===
==== Larkin Cup ====
The Larkin Cup is a knock-out competition for the top South Derry Senior clubs. It is named after Seán Larkin (Irish: Seán Ó Lorcain), a militant Irish republican from the townland of Bellagherty (Baile Uí Facharthaigh) in Ballindery. He was a member of the Irish Volunteers in the early 1910s, and was later a member of the Irish Republican Army (3rd Western Division) during the Irish War of Independence. He fought for the "anti-treaty" side in the Irish Civil War and was captured and executed by the Irish Free State on 14 March 1923. Prior to 1958?, the semi-final and final of the Derry Senior Football Championship was played between the winners of the South Derry Championship, North Derry Championship and Derry City Championship. These district championships ceases to exist after the Derry Senior Championship became open-draw in 1958. The Larkin Cup was presented to the winners of the South Derry Championship, so effectively it is the modern-day South Derry Senior Football Championship. The current holders are Desertmartin.

Larkin Cup Roll of honour (incomplete)
Draw and fixtures for 2008 Larkin Cup

==== Dr. Kerlin Cup ====
The Dr. Kerlin Cup is a knock-out competition for the top North Derry clubs. It has been running for over 70 years and the final has been traditionally played on Claudy Green. The current holders are Claudy.

Dr. Kerlin Cup Roll of honour

==== McGlinchey Cup ====
The McGlinchey Cup is a knock-out competition for South Derry clubs, regarded as the secondary South Derry district competition after the Larkin Cup. It is named after Dean McGlinchey. The current holders are Ballymaguigan GAC.

McGlinchey Cup Roll of honour (incomplete)
Draw and fixtures for 2008 McGlinchey Cup

==== O'Hagan Cup ====
The O'Hagan Cup is a knock-out competition for North Derry clubs, regarded as the secondary North Derry district competition after the Dr. Kerlin Cup. It is named after James O'Hagan. The current holders are Glenullin.

O'Hagan Cup Roll of honour (incomplete)
Draw and fixtures for 2008 O'Hagan Cup

== Under 21 ==
=== Championships ===
A new format for he Under 21 championship was introduced in 2016. All Derry clubs can opt to play in the Jack Cassidy Cup which is fifteen a side or the Harry O'Kane cup which is thirteen a side.

== Minor ==
=== Derry Minor Football Championship ===
The Derry Minor Football Championship is the most prestigious football competition for Under-18 teams in Derry. It has been running for over 60 years. The winners of the Derry Minor Championship qualify to represent Derry in the Ulster Minor Club Football Championship. Bellaghy have won the championship the most times, winning 9 titles since their first success in 1953. The 2015 champions were Glen.

=== Other Minor competitions ===
==== Tommy O'Neill Cup ====
The Tommy O'Neill Cup is a cup played for between the South Derry 'B' and North Derry 'B' Champions. It is named after the late Tommy O'Neill, a former Ballymaguigan underage player.

Tommy O'Neill Cup Roll of honour

==== Hughes/McElwee Memorial Cup ====
The Hughes/McElwee Cup is a 13 aside (as opposed to the usual 15) knock-out competition for the top South Derry Minor clubs. It is named after Vol. Francis Hughes and Vol. Thomas McElwee, two cousins from Bellaghy who were members of the Provisional Irish Republican Army and died on hunger strike in 1981. It is a new tournament, with 2008 being its inaugural year. 15 teams will compete.

Draw and fixtures for 2008 Hughes/McElwee Memorial Cup

==== Carlin/Duffy Cup ====
The Carlin/Duffy Cup is a 13 aside (as opposed to the usual 15) knock-out competition for the top North Derry Minor clubs. It has been running for a number of years. 18 teams will compete in the 2008 competition.

Carlin/Duffy Cup Roll of honour (incomplete??)
Draw and fixtures for 2008 Carlin/Duffy Cup
