= 2007 Ulster Senior Hurling Championship =

- Dates: May 13 – June 3, 2007
- Teams: 5
- Champions: Antrim (47th title); Seán Delargy (captain); Terence McNaughton & Dominic McKinley (manager)
- Runners-up: Down; Stephen Murray (captain); Gerald Coulter (manager)

Tournament statistics
- Matches played: 5

The 2007 Ulster Senior Hurling Championship was the 59th staging of the Ulster hurling championship since its establishment by the Ulster Council in 1901.

Antrim were the winners.

== Team changes ==
=== To Championship ===
Re entered championship

- Armagh

=== From Championship ===
Withdrew from championship

- New York

== Teams ==
=== General Information ===
Five counties will compete in the Ulster Senior Hurling Championship:

County	Last Provincial Title	Last All-Ireland Title	Position in 2006 Championship	Appearance
Antrim	2006	—	Champions	
Armagh	—	—	—	
Derry	2001	—	Semi-finals	
Down	1997	—	Semi-finals	
London	—	—	Quarter-finals	

=== Personnel and kits ===
County	Manager	Captain(s)	Sponsor
Antrim			
Armagh			
Derry			
Down			
London			

== Bracket ==
Quarter-finals
Derry	1-14
Armagh	0-16

Semi-finals
Antrim	4-16
London	3-08
Down	1-13, 5-16
Derry	0-16, 1-15

Final
Antrim	2-24
Down	0-04

== Quarter-finals ==
May 13
1st Round

Armagh	0-16 - 1-14	Derry

Casement Park, Belfast
Referee: Declan Magee (Down)

== Semi-finals ==
May 13
Semi-Final

Antrim	4-16 - 3-08	London

Casement Park, Belfast
Referee: Tiernach Mahon (Fermanagh)

May 20
Semi-Final

Derry	0-16 - 1-13	Down

Casement Park, Belfast

May 26
Semi-Final
Replay

Derry	1-15 - 5-16	Down

Casement Park, Belfast

== Final ==
June 3
Final

Antrim	2-24 - 0-04	Down
	Report

Casement Park, Belfast

== Stadia and locations ==
County	Location	Province	Stadium(s)	Capacity
Antrim	Belfast	Ulster	Casement Park	31,661
Armagh	Armagh	Ulster	Athletic Grounds	18,500
Derry	Derry	Ulster	Celtic Park	22,000
Down	Newry	Ulster	Páirc Esler	20,000
London	South Ruislip	Britain	McGovern Park	3,000

== Championship statistics ==
=== Scoring events ===
- Widest winning margin: 26 points
  - Antrim 2-24 - 0-04 Down (Final)
- Most goals in a match: 7
  - Antrim 4-16 - 3-08 London (Semi-final)
- Most points in a match: 31
  - Down 5-16 - 1-15 Derry (Semi-final replay)
- Most goals by one team in a match: 5
  - Down 5-16 - 1-15 Derry (Semi-final replay)
- Most points by one team in a match: 24
  - Antrim 2-24 - 0-04 Down (Final)
- Highest aggregate score: 49 points
  - Down 5-16 - 1-15 Derry (Semi-final replay)
- Lowest aggregate score: 32 points
  - Down 1-13 - 0-16 Derry (Semi-final)

== Miscellaneous ==
- Antrim won their 6th ulster title in a row.
- Despite reaching the 2006 final, New York withdrew from the championship.

== See also ==
- 2007 All-Ireland Senior Hurling Championship
- 2007 Christy Ring Cup
- 2007 Nicky Rackard Cup
