= 2017 Ulster Senior Hurling Championship =

- Dates: 8–16 April 2017
- Teams: 4 Championship; 4 Shield
- Champions: Antrim (57th title); Simon McCrory (captain); Terence McNaughton & Dominic McKinley (manager)
- Runners-up: Armagh; David Carvill (captain); Sylvester McConnell (manager)
- Promoted: Derry
- Relegated: Donegal

Tournament statistics
- Matches played: 3 Championship; 3 Shield
- Top scorer(s): Conor Johnston (3–10)

The 2017 Ulster Senior Hurling Championship is the sixty-ninth edition of the Ulster Senior Hurling Championship since its establishment by the Ulster Council in 1901 is the highest-tier of Hurling for senior county teams in Ulster. It is contested by four Ulster GAA county teams ranked 1–4 from the 2016 Ulster Senior Hurling Championship. The championship was moved to April, instead of the usual June/July dates, in order to accommodate the various tiers of the 2017 All-Ireland Senior Hurling Championship.

Antrim won a sixteenth consecutive title.

== Team changes ==
=== To championship ===
Promoted from the Ulster Senior Hurling Shield

- Donegal

=== From championship ===
Relegated to the Ulster Senior Hurling Shield

- Derry

== Format ==
The two-tier format introduced in 2016 continued.

Ulster Senior Hurling Championship

In the first tier, the Ulster Senior Hurling Championship, Antrim, Armagh, Donegal and Down compete in a knock-out format. The winners receive the Liam Harvey cup. The two teams beaten in the semi-finals of the Championship play-off with the losing team relegated to the Shield for 2018.

Ulster Senior Hurling Shield

In the second tier, the Ulster Senior Hurling Shield, Derry, Fermanagh, Monaghan and Tyrone compete in a knock-out format, with the winner gaining promotion to the top tier for 2018. Cavan do not participate.

Promotion/Relegation

The Shield winners are promoted to the top tier and the loser of the top tier relegation play-off are relegated.

All-Ireland Senior Hurling Championship

There is no direct path for the Ulster Champions in the 2017 All-Ireland Senior Hurling Championship. The Counties competed in the Christy Ring Cup, Nicky Rackard Cup and Lory Meagher Cup.

== Teams ==
=== General Information ===
Four counties will compete in the Ulster Senior Hurling Championship:

County	Last Provincial Title	Last All-Ireland Title	Position in 2016 Championship	Appearance
Antrim	2016	—	Champions	
Armagh	—	—	Runners-up	
Down	1997	—	Semi-finals	
Donegal	1932	—	Champions (Ulster shield)	

=== Team statistics ===
Antrim	Armagh	Donegal	Down
Titles
56	0	3	4
Last title
2016	n/a	1932	1997

=== Championship Teams ===
County	Location	Championship	Division	Championship Titles	Last Championship Title
Antrim	Casement Park	Christy Ring Cup	2A	56	2016
Armagh	Athletic Grounds	Nicky Rackard Cup	2A	0	-
Donegal	MacCumhaill Park	Nicky Rackard Cup	3A	3	1932
Down	Páirc Esler	Christy Ring	2B	4	1997

=== Shield Teams ===
County	Location	Championship	Division	Championship Titles	Last Championship Title
Derry	Celtic Park	Nicky Rackard Cup	2B	4	2001
Fermanagh	Brewster Park	Lory Meagher Cup	3B	0	-
Monaghan	St Tiernach's Park	Nicky Rackard Cup	3A	2	1915
Tyrone	Healy Park	Nicky Rackard Cup	3A	0	-

== Bracket ==
=== Bracket ===
Semi-Finals
Armagh	1-17
Down	2-12
Antrim	3-24
Donegal	1-10

Final
Armagh	1-12
Antrim	5-22
Relegation Playoff
Down	w/o
Donegal	scr.

== Semi-finals ==
=== Semi-final matches ===
8 April 2017
3 p.m.
Semi-final

Armagh	1-17 – 2-12	Down
	Report

Inniskeen Grattan's GAC, Inniskeen
8 April 2017
3 p.m.
Semi-final

Antrim	3-24 – 1-10	Donegal
	Report

Celtic Park, Derry

== Final ==
=== Ulster Final ===
16 April 2017
2:30 p.m.
Final

Antrim	5-22 – 1-12	Armagh
C Johnston 3-05, N McManus 1-06 (1f), P Shiels 1-00, E Campbell 0-03, M Connolly 0-03 (2f), C Clarke 0-02, P McGill 0-01, C McKinley 0-01, C Carson 0-01	Report	D Carvill 0-07 (6f), F Bradley 1-00, C Corvan 0-03, C Carvill 0-01, D Magee 0-01

Owenbeg, Dungiven
Referee: James Clarke (Cavan)

== Relegation Playoff ==
=== Relegation playoff match ===
16 April 2017
12:30 p.m.
Relegation match

Down	walkover – withdrew	Donegal
	Report

Owenbeg, Dungiven
- Donegal withdrew ahead of the match, and were relegated to the 2018 Ulster Hurling Shield. Down retained their place for the 2018 Ulster Hurling Championship.

== Ulster Senior Hurling Shield ==
=== Bracket ===
Semi-Finals
Tyrone	4-18
Fermanagh	1-10
Monaghan	0-09
Derry	6-28

Final
Tyrone	1-12
Derry	1-17

=== Ulster Shield Semi-Finals ===
8 April 2017
3 p.m.
Semi-final

Tyrone	4-18 – 1-10	Fermanagh

St. Tiernach's Park, Clones
8 April 2017
3 p.m.
Semi-final

Monaghan	0-9 – 6-28	Derry

Healy Park, Omagh

=== Ulster Shield Final ===
16 April 2017
2:30 p.m.
Final

Tyrone	1-12 – 1-17	Derry
	Report

Páirc Naomh Colmcille, Carrickmore
- Derry won the 2017 Ulster Hurling shield and promotion to the 2018 Ulster Senior Hurling Championship.

== Championship statistics ==
=== Scoring events ===
- Widest winning margin: 22 points
  - Armagh 1-12 - 5-22 Antrim (Final)
- Most goals in a match: 6
  - Armagh 1-12 - 5-22 Antrim (Final)
- Most points in a match: 34
  - Antrim 3-24 - 1-10 Donegal (Semi-finals)
  - Armagh 1-12 - 5-22 Antrim (Final)
- Most goals by one team in a match: 5
  - Armagh 1-12 - 5-22 Antrim (Final)
- Most points by one team in a match: 24
  - Antrim 3-24 - 1-10 Donegal (Semi-finals)
- Highest aggregate score: 52 points
  - Armagh 1-12 - 5-22 Antrim (Final)
- Lowest aggregate score: 38 points
  - Armagh 1-17 - 2-12 Down (Semi-finals)

== Miscellaneous ==
- Antrim won their 16th Ulster title in a row.
- Armagh reached their fourth ever ulster final.

== See also ==
- 2017 All-Ireland Senior Hurling Championship
- 2017 Leinster Senior Hurling Championship
- 2017 Munster Senior Hurling Championship
- 2017 Christy Ring Cup
- 2017 Nicky Rackard Cup
- 2017 Lory Meagher Cup
