= 2016 Ulster Senior Hurling Championship =

- Dates: 19 June – 10 July 2016
- Teams: 4 Championship; 4 Shield
- Champions: Antrim (56th title); Conor Carson (captain); Dominic McKinley & Terence McNaughton (manager)
- Runners-up: Armagh; Cahal Carvill (captain); Sylvester McConnell (manager)
- Promoted: Donegal
- Relegated: Derry

Tournament statistics
- Matches played: 3 Championship; 2 Shield

The 2016 Ulster Senior Hurling Championship was the 68th staging of the Ulster hurling championship since its establishment by the Ulster Council in 1901.

The final is traditionally played on the second Sunday in July. The winners receive the Liam Harvey Cup.

Antrim won the title by defeating Armagh in the final.

== Team changes ==
=== To championship ===
Entered championship

- None

=== From championship ===
Transferred to the Ulster Senior Hurling Shield

- Donegal

== Format ==
A two-tier format was introduced in 2016. Antrim no longer receive a bye to the final.

Antrim, Armagh, Derry and Down compete in the top tier in a knock-out format.

A second tier, the Ulster Senior Hurling Shield, was created. Donegal, Fermanagh, Monaghan and Tyrone compete in a knock-out format, with the winner gaining promotion to the top tier for 2017.

The beaten semi-finalists in this year's Senior Championship compete in a relegation play-off with the losing team relegated to the Senior Shield for 2017.

Cavan do not participate.

== Teams ==
=== General Information ===
Four counties will compete in the Ulster Senior Hurling Championship:

County	Last Provincial Title	Last All-Ireland Title	Position in 2015 Championship	Appearance
Antrim	2015	—	Champions	
Armagh	—	—	Quarter-finals	
Derry	2001	—	Semi-finals	
Down	1997	—	Runners-up	

== Bracket ==
=== Bracket ===
Semi-finals; 19 June
Derry	0–14
Antrim	3–28
Armagh	4–12
Down	0–17

Ulster final 10 July
Antrim	6–21
Armagh	4–14
Relegation Playoff; 26 June
Derry	scr.
Down	w/o

== Semi-finals ==
=== Semi-final matches ===
19 June 2016
17:00
Semi-final

Derry	0-14 - 3-28	Antrim
	Report

Athletic Grounds, Armagh
19 June 2016
19:00
Semi-final

Armagh	4-12 - 0-17	Down
	Report

Athletic Grounds, Armagh

== Final ==
=== Ulster Championship Final ===
10 July 2016
Final

Antrim	6-21 - 4-14	Armagh
C Clarke 2-07 (3f), J Connolly 2-02, J Dillon 1-02, C Carson 1-01, B McCarry, D McKernan 0-03 each, J McKeague, E McCloskey 0-01 each, C McNaughton 0-01 (f)	Report	E McGuinness 2-02, R Gaffney 0-07 (7f), J King, D Coulter 1-00 each, F Bradley, C Carvill 0-02 each, C Corvan 0-01

Owenbeg, Dungiven
Referee: E. Hassan (Derry)

== Relegation playoff ==
=== Relegation playoff match ===
26 June 2016
Relegation play-off

Derry	scr. – w/o	Down

== Ulster Senior Hurling Shield ==
=== Bracket ===
Semifinals
Tyrone	scr.
Monaghan	w/o
Fermanagh	3-14
Donegal	3-18

Final
Monaghan	2-14
Donegal	5-13

=== Ulster Shield Semi-Finals ===
19 June 2016
Semi-final

Tyrone	scr. – w/o	Monaghan
	Report

Brewster Park, Fermanagh
19 June 2016
Semi-final

Fermanagh	3-14 - 3-18	Donegal
	Report

Brewster Park, Fermanagh

=== Ulster Shield Final ===
26 June 2016
Final

Monaghan	2-14 - 5-13	Donegal
Declan Crowe (0-2), Conor Boyle (1-5, 3f, 2’65s’), Conor McKenna (0-2), Fergal Rafter (0-1,f); Mark Treanor (1-3), Brian McGuigan (0-1).		Jack O’Loughlin (1-0), Danny Cullen (1-1), Stephen Gillespie (0-1); Ronan McDermott (1-0), Niall Cleary (0-1), Lee Henderson (0-7,6f), Paddy Hannigan (1-0), Kevin Campbell (1-1) Paul Nelson (0-2)

Brewster Park, Fermanagh
Referee: C. Cunning (Antrim)

== See also ==
- 2016 All-Ireland Senior Hurling Championship
