= Michael Bradley (hurler) =

Irish hurler

Personal information
- Native name: Mícheál Ó Brolcháin (Irish)
- Born: 1994 (age 31–32) Belfast, Northern Ireland
- Occupation: Firefighter

Sport
- Sport: Hurling
- Position: Midfield
Club
- Years: Club
- St. John's
Club titles
- Antrim titles: 0
Inter-county
- Years: County
- 2013-present: Antrim
Inter-county titles
- Ulster titles: 2
- All-Irelands: 0
- NHL: 0
- All Stars: 0

Michael Bradley (born 1994) is an Irish hurler who plays for Antrim Senior Championship club St. John's and at inter-county level with the Antrim senior hurling team. He usually lines out as a midfielder or at wing-forward.

== Career ==
A member of the St. John's club in Belfast, Bradley first appeared on the inter-county scene as a member of the Antrim minor team during the 2012 Ulster Minor Championship. He later won consecutive Ulster Under-21 Championship titles and came on as a substitute in Antrim's 2013 All-Ireland final defeat by Clare. Bradley joined the Antrim senior hurling team straight out of the minor grade and won two Ulster Championship titles over the following few years before leaving the team. He was recalled to the team shortly afterwards and was at midfield for Antrim's 2020 Joe McDonagh Cup triumph.

== Honours ==
Antrim

- Ulster Senior Hurling Championship: 2013, 2014
- Joe McDonagh Cup: 2020
- National Hurling League Division 2A: 2020
- Ulster Under-21 Hurling Championship: 2013, 2014
