= Armagh county hurling team =

Hurling team

Armagh
- Sport: Hurling
- Irish: Árd Mhaca
- Nickname(s): The Orchard County
- County board: Armagh GAA
- Home venue(s): Athletic Grounds, Armagh

Recent competitive record
- Current All-Ireland status: Nicky Rackard Cup (3rd) in 2025
- Last championship title: 2012 Nicky Rackard Cup
- Current NHL Division: 3 (5th in 2025)
- Last league title: 2016 (Division 2B)

The Armagh county hurling team represents Armagh GAA, the county board of the Gaelic Athletic Association, in the Gaelic sport of hurling. The team competes in the Nicky Rackard Cup and the National Hurling League.

Armagh's home ground is Athletic Grounds, Armagh. The team's manager is Karl McKeegan.

The team has never won the Ulster Senior Championship, the All-Ireland Senior Championship or the National League.

The team is nicknamed the Orchard men.

== History ==
Like most counties outside of the game's heartland of Munster and south Leinster, hurling has tended to live in the shadow cast by Gaelic football in Armagh, with the exception of border areas such as Keady, Middletown and Armagh City.

In 2006, Armagh won the NHL Division 3 championship, winning all its games in the group stages before defeating Louth by a scoreline of 3–10 to 1–11 in the final at Breffni Park in Cavan. The step up to Division 2 proved to be a difficult one for the men from the Orchard County. While the team failed to win any of its group games, it was unfortunate to lose to Meath and also managed to come within a point of 2006 Christy Ring Cup finalists Carlow. Heavier defeats were suffered at the hands of more established counties such as Derry and Laois.

Armagh returned to the Ulster Senior Hurling Championship in May 2007 for the first time in almost 60 years with a match against Derry. Despite a strong performance, the team lost out on a semi-final encounter with neighbouring team Down due to an injury-time score.

The advances made in the county over the previous two years placed it as the favourite in the 2007 Nicky Rackard Cup Final against Roscommon on 12 August; however, Armagh lost this game by two points.

Armagh won the 2010 Nicky Rackard Cup, defeating London by a scoreline of 3–15 to 3–14 at Croke Park on 3 July. The county's minor team won the Ulster Minor Hurling League Division One title and reached the final of the Ulster Minor Hurling Championship. The county's under-21 team also reached the final of the Ulster Under-21 Hurling Championship.

In 2011, Armagh reached the Ulster Senior Hurling Championship final for the first time since 1946 and advanced to the Ulster Under-21 Hurling Championship final for a second consecutive year, the first time in team history.

Armagh won the 2012 Nicky Rackard Cup, its second time to lift the trophy, defeating Louth by a scoreline of 3–20 to 1–15 at Croke Park on 9 June.

Armagh lost the 2015 Nicky Rackard Cup final to Roscommon by a scoreline of 2–12 to 1–14, even though Roscommon had one less player due to a straight red card and the team was behind for the entire second-half until scoring a goal from a 20-metre free at the end.

Armagh won Division 2B in 2016, earning promotion to Division 2A. But it was then relegated.

Armagh defeated Down in the 2016 Ulster Senior Hurling Championship semi-final, giving them a place in the final, where Antrim prevailed. Armagh also lost to Antrim in the 2017 Ulster Senior Hurling Championship final.

Armagh lost the 2016 Nicky Rackard Cup final to Mayo by a scoreline of 2–16 to 1–15, giving Mayo a first Nicky Rackard trophy.

Armagh lost the 2017 Nicky Rackard Cup final to Derry by a scoreline of 3–23 to 2–15.

Armagh lost the 2019 Nicky Rackard Cup final to Sligo by a scoreline of 2–14 to 2–13; though the team was four points ahead of Sligo as the game reached its conclusion, Sligo scored two late points and a goal to secure a one-point victory.

== Managerial history ==
Sylvester McConnell?

P. Kelly, the former Meath hurler, 2017–

Kelly took charge of Armagh for the 2018 National Hurling League.

Kelly stood aside upon Armagh's relegation to Division 3A of the National Hurling League, replaced by interim manager Padraig O'Connor, O'Connor then being reappointed in 2019

Terence "Sambo" McNaughton was appointed manager in March 2022.

Karl McKeegan was appointed manager in October 2022.

== Honours ==
Official honours, with additions noted.

=== National ===
- National Hurling League Division 2B
  - (gold) Winners (1): 2016
- National Hurling League Division 3
  - (gold) Winners (2): 1999, 2006
- All-Ireland Junior Hurling Championship/Nicky Rackard Cup
  - (gold) Winners (5): 1978, 1979, 2000, 2010, 2012
  - (silver) Runners-up (5): 2007, 2015, 2016, 2017, 2019

=== Provincial ===
- Ulster Senior Hurling Championship
  - (silver) Runners-up (4): 1946, 2011, 2016, 2017
- Ulster Under-21 Hurling Championship
  - (silver) Runners-up (4): 1968, 1979, 2010, 2011
- Ulster Minor Hurling Championship
  - (gold) Winners (1): 1975
- Ulster Junior Hurling Championship
  - (gold) Winners (6): 1949, 1965, 1973, 1990, 1991, 2000
- Ulster Minor Hurling League Division 1
  - (gold) Winners (1): 2010
