= Karl McKeegan =

Antrim hurler

Personal information
- Native name: Caireall Mac Aogáin (Irish)
- Born: 1978 (age 47–48) Cushendall, County Antrim, Northern Ireland
- Occupation: Lab technician
- Height: 5 ft 10 in (178 cm)

Sport
- Sport: Hurling
- Position: Centre-back
Club
- Years: Club
- 1995–2016: Ruairí Óg Cushendall
Club titles
- Antrim titles: 7
- Ulster titles: 5
Inter-county
- Years: County
- 2002–2011: Antrim
Inter-county titles
- Ulster titles: 10
- All-Irelands: 0
- NHL: 0
- All Stars: 0

Karl McKeegan (born 1978) is an Irish former hurler who played as a centre-back at senior level for the Antrim county team.

== Playing career ==
McKeegan began his hurling career at juvenile and underage levels with the Ruairí Óg club in Cushendall. He was still eligible for the minor grade when he joined the club's senior team in 1995. McKeegan spent over 20 years lining out for the senior team, during which time he won five Ulster SCHC titles and seven Antrim SHC titles. He ended his club career after a defeat by Na Piarsaigh in the 2016 All-Ireland club final.

McKeegan first appeared on the inter-county scene at underage level with Antrim and won two Ulster MHC titles and three Ulster U21HC titles. He joined the senior team in 2002 and won ten consecutive Ulster SHC medals during a ten-year career. McKeegan captained Antrim to the Christy Ring Cup title in 2006.

== Management career ==
McKeegan spent three seasons in charge of the Antrim under-20 team before being named as the Armagh senior hurling team manager in October 2022.

== Honours ==
Ruairí Óg

- Ulster Senior Club Hurling Championship: 1996, 1999, 2006, 2008, 2015
- Antrim Senior Hurling Championship: 1996, 1999, 2005, 2006, 2008, 2014, 2015
- Antrim Under-21 Hurling Championship: 1999

Antrim

- Christy Ring Cup: 2006
- Ulster Senior Hurling Championship: 2002, 2003, 2004, 2005, 2006, 2007, 2008, 2009, 2010, 2011
- Ulster Under-21 Hurling Championship: 1996, 1998, 1999
- Ulster Minor Hurling Championship: 1995, 1996

Sporting positions
Preceded by	Antrim senior hurling team captain 2006	Succeeded by Seán Delargy
Preceded by Conor Gillen	Antrim under-20 hurling team manager 2018–2021	Succeeded by Paudie Shivers
Preceded by Terence McNaughton	Armagh senior hurling team manager 2022–	Succeeded by Incumbent
Achievements
Preceded by John Shaw	Christy Ring Cup Final winning captain 2006	Succeeded by Darren McCormack
