= 2014 Ulster Senior Hurling Championship =

- Dates: 15 June – 13 July 2014
- Teams: 5
- Champions: Antrim (54th title); Paul Shiels (captain); Liam Bradley (manager)
- Runners-up: Derry; Ger Rogan (manager)

Tournament statistics
- Matches played: 5

The 2014 Ulster Senior Hurling Championship was the 64th staging of the Ulster hurling championship since its establishment by the Ulster Council in 1901.

Antrim won.

== Team changes ==
=== To championship ===
Re entered championship

- Donegal

=== From championship ===
Withdrew from championship

- None

== Format ==
Five teams entered. Antrim as holders received a bye to the final, while the other four teams played off for the other final place.

== Teams ==
=== General Information ===
Four counties will compete in the Ulster Senior Hurling Championship:

County	Last Provincial Title	Last All-Ireland Title	Position in 2013 Championship	Appearance
Antrim	2013	—	Champions	
Armagh	—	—	Quarter-finals	
Derry	2001	—	SemI-finals	
Donegal	1932	—	—	
Down	1997	—	Runners-up	

== Quarter-finals ==
15 June 2014 Quarter-final	Donegal	0-10 – 1-31	Down	St. Tiernach's Park, Clones
		Report		Referee: C Cunning (Antrim)

15 June 2014 Quarter-final	Derry	4-16 – 3-13	Armagh	Athletic Grounds, Armagh
		Report

== Semi-finals ==
29 June 2014 Semi-final	Derry	5-22 – 3-28 (a.e.t.)	Down	St. Tiernach's Park, Clones
		Report

- This game was tied after the normal 20 minutes of extra time: Derry 4-20, Down 3-23. The teams agreed to play another 10 minutes of extra time, but the game was still tied after that, so they had a replay.

5 July 2014 Semi-final replay	Derry	2-19 – 1-15	Down	Athletic Grounds, Armagh
		Report		Referee: Garrett Duffy (Antrim)

== Final ==
13 July 2014 Final	Antrim	2-17 – 2-16	Derry	Owenbeg, Dungiven
	P Shiels 0-8 (6f); C McCann 1-2; PJ O’Connell 1-0; D McKernan 0-2; D Hamill, N McKenna, D McCloskey 0-1 each	Report	R Convery 1-10 (0-8f, 0-2 '65'); A Kelly 0-4; P McCloskey 1-0; S McGuigan, S Farren 0-1 each	Referee: Fergal Horgan (Tipperary)
