= 2006 Ulster Senior Hurling Championship =

- Teams: 5
- Champions: Antrim (46th title)

Tournament statistics
- Matches played: 4

The 2006 Ulster Senior Hurling Championship was the 58th staging of the Ulster hurling championship since its establishment by the Ulster Council in 1901. The Championship was won by Antrim after they defeated New York.

== Team changes ==
=== To championship ===
Entered championship

- None

=== From championship ===
Withdrew from championship

- None

== Teams ==
=== General information ===
Five counties competed in the Ulster Senior Hurling Championship:

County	Last Championship Title	Last All-Ireland Title	Position in 2005 Championship
Antrim	2004	—	Champions
Derry	2001	—	Semi-finals
Down	1997	—	Runners-up
London	—	1901	Quarter-finals
New York	—	—	Semi-finals

=== Personnel and kits ===
County	Manager	Captain(s)	Sponsor
Antrim			
Derry			
Down			
London			
New York			

== Bracket ==
Quarter-finals
Antrim	2-16
London	1-14

Semi-finals
New York	1-18
Derry	1-12
Down	0-12
Antrim	2-23

Final
New York	1-14
Antrim	2-20

== Quarter-finals ==
=== Matches ===
Quarter-final	Antrim	2-16 - 1-14	London

== Semi-finals ==
=== Matches ===
Semi-final	New York	1-18 - 1-12	Derry

Semi-final	Antrim	2-23 - 0-12	Down

== Final ==
Final	Antrim	2-20 - 1-14	New York

== Stadia and locations ==
County	Location	Province	Stadium(s)	Capacity
Antrim	Belfast	Ulster	Casement Park	31,661
Derry	Derry	Ulster	Celtic Park	22,000
Down	Newry	Ulster	Páirc Esler	20,000
London	South Ruislip	Britain	McGovern Park	3,000
New York	Bronx	North America	Gaelic Park	2,000

== Championship statistics ==
=== Top scorers ===
==== Overall ====
Rank	Player	County	Tally	Total	Matches	Average
1						
2						
3						
4						
5						

==== Single game ====
Rank	Player	County	Tally	Total	Matches	Average
1						
2						
3						
4						
5						

=== Scoring events ===
- Widest winning margin: 17 points
  - Down 0-12 - 2-23 Antrim (Semi-final)
- Most goals in a match: 3
  - Antrim 2-16 - 1-14 London (Quarter-final)
  - New York 1-14 - 2-20 Antrim (Final)
- Most points in a match: 35
  - Down 0-12 - 2-23 Antrim (Semi-final)
- Most goals by one team in a match: 2
  - Antrim 2-16 - 1-14 London (Quarter-final)
  - Down 0-12 - 2-23 Antrim (Semi-final)
  - New York 1-14 - 2-20 Antrim (Final)
- Most points by one team in a match: 23
  - Down 0-12 - 2-23 Antrim (Semi-final)
- Highest aggregate score: 43 points
  - New York 1-14 - 2-20 Antrim (Final)
- Lowest aggregate score: 36 points
  - New York 1-18 - 1-12 Derry (Semi-final)

== Miscellaneous ==
- New York reach their first ever provincial final

== See also ==
- 2006 All-Ireland Senior Hurling Championship (Tier 1)
- 2006 Christy Ring Cup (Tier 2)
- 2006 Nicky Rackard Cup (Tier 3)
