= Ger Rogan =

Antrim hurler, Gaelic footballer and team manager

Personal information
- Native name: Gearóid Ó Ruagáin (Irish)
- Born: 1963 (age 62–63) Belfast, County Antrim

Sport
- Football Position: Full Back
- Hurling Position: Centre Half Back
Club
- Years: Club
- O'Donovan Rossa
Club titles
	Football	Hurling
Antrim titles	2	1
Ulster titles	0	1
All-Ireland titles	0	0
Inter-county
- Years: County
- 1982-1987 1982-1991: Antrim (F); Antrim (H)
Inter-county titles
	Football	Hurling
Ulster Titles	0	2
All-Ireland Titles	0	0
League titles	0	0
All-Stars	0	0

Ger Rogan (born 1963) is an Irish hurling manager and former Antrim dual player. He is a former manager of the Derry senior and under-21 county teams.

Rogan made his first appearances for the Antrim senior hurling 1981 and Gaelic football teams in 1982. He continued with the footballers for five seasons but remained with the hurlers until his retirement after the 1991-92 National League. During his inter-county career he won one All-Ireland "B" winners' medal and three ulster winners' medals. Rogan won Antrim and Ulster titles in handball at under 18 21 and senior and remains the only player to represent his county At handball hurling and football at senior level in the same season. At club level Rogan is a one-time Ulster hurling medalist with O'Donovan Rossa. In addition to this he has also won one county hurling championship medals and two county football championship medals.

Sporting positions
Preceded by James O'Kane	Derry Senior Hurling Manager; 2011–2014	Succeeded by Brian Johnston
