= Conor Johnston =

Irish hurler

Personal information
- Native name: Conchúr Mac Seáin (Irish)
- Born: 1994 (age 31–32) Belfast, Northern Ireland

Sport
- Sport: Hurling
- Position: Left corner-forward
Club
- Years: Club
- St. John's
Club titles
- Antrim titles: 0
College
- Years: College
- St. Mary's University College
College titles
- Sigerson titles: 0
- Fitzgibbon titles: 0
Inter-county
- Years: County
- 2013-present: Antrim
Inter-county titles
- Leinster titles: 2
- All-Irelands: 0
- NHL: 0
- All Stars: 0

Conor Johnston (born 1994) is an Irish hurler who plays for Antrim Senior Championship club St. John's and at inter-county level with the Antrim senior hurling team. He usually lines out as a forward.

== Career ==
A member of the St. John's club in Belfast, Johnston first came to prominence on the inter-county scene as a member of the Antrim minor team. He captained the team to the Ulster Minor Championship title in 2011, before later claiming Ulster Under-21 Championship success. Johnston was drafted onto the Antrim senior hurling team straight out of the minor grade. Since then he has won two Ulster Championship titles, a National League Division 2A title and a Joe McDonagh Cup title.

== Honours ==
Antrim

- Ulster Senior Hurling Championship: 2013, 2017
- Joe McDonagh Cup: 2020
- National Hurling League Division 2A: 2017
- Ulster Under-21 Hurling Championship: 2015
- Ulster Minor Hurling Championship: 2011
