= Terence McNaughton =

Irish hurler

Terence "Sambo" McNaughton
Personal information
- Native name: Toirealach Mac Neachtain (Irish)
- Nickname: Sambo
- Born: 1965 (age 60–61) Cushendall, County Antrim, Northern Ireland
- Occupation: Publican
- Height: 6 ft 1 in (185 cm)

Sport
- Sport: Hurling
- Position: Left wing-back
Club
- Years: Club
- 1981–2000: Ruairí Óg Cushendall
Club titles
- Antrim titles: 8
- Ulster titles: 7
Inter-county*
Years	County	Apps (scores)
1981–1997	Antrim	27 (1–25)
Inter-county titles
- Ulster titles: 6
- All-Irelands: 0
- NHL: 0
- All Stars: 1
- *Inter County team apps and scores correct as of 22:10, 10 March 2015.

Terence "Sambo" McNaughton (born 1965) is an Irish former hurler who played as a left wing-back at senior level for the Antrim county team.

Born in Cushendall, County Antrim, McNaughton first played competitive hurling during his schooling at St Aloysius High School. He arrived on the inter-county scene at the age of sixteen when he first linked up with the Antrim senior team, while also joining the under-21 and senior sides. He made his senior debut during the 1981 "B" championship. McNaughton immediately became a regular member of the starting fifteen and won two All-Ireland "B" medals and six Ulster medals. He was an All-Ireland runner-up on one occasion.

As a member of the Ulster inter-provincial team on a number of occasions, McNaughton ended his career without a Railway Cup medal. At club level he is a seven-time Ulster Senior Club Hurling Championship medallist with Ruarí Óg Cushendall. In addition to this he also won eight Antrim Senior Hurling Championship medals.

Throughout his career McNaughton made 27 championship appearances. He retired from inter-county hurling following the conclusion of the 1997 championship.

In retirement from playing McNaughton became involved in team management. Having coached at almost every grade with Ruarí Óg, he also took charge of the Antrim minor, under-21 and senior teams as joint manager.

McNaughton is regarded as one of Antrim's greatest ever players and as one of the best players never to win an All-Ireland medal. In 2013 he was chosen at left wing-back on a special "Stars of the 1980s" team.

== Playing career ==
=== Club ===
McNaughton joined the Ruarí Óg senior team as a sixteen-year-old in 1981. He won his first championship medal that year following a one-point defeat of Ballycastle in a replay of the decider. It was the club's first championship title. McNaughton later added an Ulster medal to his collection following a 4–17 to 0–9 trouncing of Portaferry.

Four years later Cushendall were back in another county decider. Loughgiel Shamrocks provided the opposition, however, a 4–13 to 1–12 victory gave McNaughton a second championship medal. He later won a second Ulster medal following a 0–19 to 0–10 victory over Ballycran.

Cushendall failed to retain the title once again, however, McNaughton collected a third championship medal in 1987 following a defeat of O'Donovan Rossa. He later won a third Ulster title following a 3–10 to 1–6 defeat of Ballycran.

After a few years out of the limelight Cushendall bounced back in 1991 to become the dominant force in Antrim hurling once again. Three successive championship decider victories over St. John's (1991) and Ballycastle (1992 and 1993) brought McNaughton's medal tally to six. He also won back-to-back Ulster medals in the first two years following defeat of Portaferry and Ballygalget respectively.

1996 saw McNaughton win a seventh championship as Ballycastle were bested once again. He later collected a sixth Ulster medal as Portaferry were beaten by 3–9 to 2–8.

Three years later McNaughton was in the twilight of his career when he captured his eighth championship medal following a defeat of Dunloy. He finished off his club career by winning a seventh Ulster title following a 1–12 to 1–8 defeat of Ballygalget.

=== Inter-county ===
McNaughton was just sixteen when he joined the Antrim senior team in 1981. It was a successful debut year as he secured an All-Ireland medal in the "B" grade as Antrim narrowly defeated London by 3–17 to 3–14.

Antrim retained their All-Ireland title in 1982, with McNaughton collecting a second winners' medal following another narrow 2–16 to 2–14 defeat of London.

In 1989 the Ulster championship was revived after a forty-five-year absence. Antrim and Down contested the decider, with McNaughton collecting his first provincial medal following a 2–16 to 0–9 victory. Antrim later defeated Kildare in the All-Ireland quarter-final before lining out against Offaly in the penultimate game of the championship. Offaly were the red hot favourites going into the game, however, McNaughton's side shocked their opponents and won the game by 4–15 to 1–15 courtesy of a brace of goals from Olcan McFetridge and another brace from Aidan McCarry. Offaly, in spite of losing, recognised the historic nature of the victory and applauded Antrim while lining up in a guard of honour as the team left the field. On 3 September 1989, Antrim faced Tipperary in a unique All-Ireland final. It was Antrim's first championship decider in forty-six years. The game was a one-sided affair from start to finish, with Tipperary's Nicky English setting a new scoring record by bagging 2–12 in the 4–24 to 3–9 victory.

In 1990, McNaughton added a second Ulster medal to his collection following a 4–11 to 2–11 defeat of Down.

Antrim made it three-in-a-row in Ulster in 1991 with McNaughton collecting his third provincial medal following a 3–14 to 3–10 defeat of Down once again. In spite of a narrow defeat by Kilkenny in the All-Ireland semi-final, McNaughton was subsequently presented with an All-Star.

Four-in-a-row proved beyond Antrim, however, a 0–24 to 0–11 drubbing of reigning champions Down in 1993 gave McNaughton a fourth Ulster medal. McNaughton added a fifth to his collection in 1994 following a 1–19 to 1–13 defeat of Down in the sixth successive meeting between these two sides in the provincial decider. Antrim lost their provincial crown in 1995, however, McNaughton won a sixth and final Ulster medal in 1996 as Down were defeated once again by 1–20 to 2–12. An Ulster final defeat by Derry in 1997 brought the curtain down on McNaughton's inter-county career.

== Managerial career ==
Terence McNaughton
Sport
Inter-county management
- Years: Team
- 2006–2009: Antrim
Inter-county titles as manager
County	League	Province	All-Ireland
Antrim	0	3	3

In retirement from playing McNaughton became involved in the coaching side of hurling. In late 2004 he took charge of the Antrim minor hurling team along with his former playing colleague Dominic McKinley. Before he took up that appointment McNaughton also took charge of a combined Ulster hurling team for Fitzgibbon Cup inter-university competition. In 2005 Antrim won the Ulster minor title; however, the team was later defeated in the All-Ireland series. In 2006 both McNaughton and McKinley were appointed co-managers of the Antrim under-21 team while also retaining their positions as co-managers of the minor team. That year both Antrim teams won their respective Ulster titles, however, both the minor and under-21 teams were later defeated in the All-Ireland series. He also went on to make hurls under the name McNaughton hurleys.

=== Antrim ===
In late 2006 both McNaughton and McKinley were appointed joint-managers of the Antrim senior hurling team. They also retained their positions as joint-managers of the under-21 team.

McNaughton and McKinley's opening season as managers got off to a good start as Antrim beat London, and then trounced Down by 2–24 to 0–4 to win the Ulster final. Antrim then went on to play in group 1A of the qualifiers, with matches against Galway, Clare and Laois. The managed a single victory over Laois, leaving them third in the group and unable to proceed any further.

McNaughton's 2008 season started promisingly with Antrim winning the Walsh Cup for the first time. This campaign included beating the 2007 (and subsequently 2008) All-Ireland Champions, Kilkenny. Later in the year, the nine counties of Ulster, along with London, participated in the Ulster Championship. A system of seeding designed to reduce the number of one-sided matches left Antrim's first game a semi-final against Derry, which they won 2–17 to 1–12. The provincial final saw Antrim take on Down once again with victory going to Antrim. McNaughton and McKinley's team got little reward for this provincial victory due to the introduction of a new format for the All-Ireland championship. This meant that Antrim were forced to play Galway in phase one of the fqualifiers. Antrim were trounced by 'the Tribesmen' by 6–21 to 1–10. Phase two of the qualifiers saw Antrim take on Waterford, however, a 6–18 to 0–15 defeat saw Antrim's championship campaign come to an end. Antrim then had to play a relegation play-off against Laois, to ensure that they remained eligible to compete in the All-Ireland series in 2009. They duly won that match 2–18 to 0–16.

Antrim's 2009 campaign marked the first time the county was admitted to the Leinster Championship. They were knocked out at the quarter-final stage by Dublin. They also competed in the Ulster Championship, where they beat Down in the final on a scoreline of 3–20 to 4–15. In spite of this, they still proceeded to the qualifiers. In phase one of the qualifiers, Antrim were beaten by Laois, to put them into the relegation playoffs, where they were beaten by Offaly. Antrim were then due to play Wexford to decide which side was to be relegated to the Christy Ring Cup for 2010. However, McNaughton and the managers of the other teams involved in the play-offs appealed to the GAA's Disputes Resolution Authority, who took the decision to postpone the relegation final until a future date. The Director General of the GAA suggested that the relegation final would be played, but that no team would end up being relegated and that a decision would be made on the issue in early October 2009.

McNaughton stepped down as manager of the Antrim Senior hurling team in August 2009.

== Honours ==
=== Player ===
Ruairí Óg Cushendall

- Ulster Senior Club Hurling Championship (7): 1981, 1985, 1987, 1991, 1992, 1996, 1999
- Antrim Senior Club Hurling Championship (8): 1981, 1985, 1987, 1991, 1992, 1993, 1996, 1999

Antrim

- All-Ireland Senior B Hurling Championship (2): 1981, 1982
- Ulster Senior Hurling Championship (6): 1989, 1990, 1991, 1993, 1994, 1996

=== Manager ===
Antrim

- Ulster Senior Hurling Championship (3): 2007, 2008, 2009
- Ulster Minor Hurling Championship (2): 2005, 2006
- Walsh Cup (1): 2008

Sporting positions
Preceded by Jim McKernan	Antrim Senior Hurling Joint-Manager; 2006–2009	Succeeded by Dinny Cahill
Preceded by P. J. O'Mullan	Antrim Senior Hurling Joint-Manager; 2016–2018	Succeeded by Neal Peden
Preceded by Pádraig O'Connor	Armagh Senior Hurling Manager; 2022	Succeeded by Karl McKeegan
