= 2015 Ulster Senior Hurling Championship =

- Advertisement for the Ulster final
- Dates: 21 June – 12 July 2015
- Teams: 5
- Champions: Antrim (55th title); Neil McManus (captain); Kevin Ryan (manager)
- Runners-up: Down

Tournament statistics
- Matches played: 4
- Goals scored: 21 (5.25 per game)
- Points scored: 120 (30.00 per game)
- Top scorer(s): Gareth Johnson (2-20)

The 2015 Ulster Senior Hurling Championship was the 67th staging of the Ulster hurling championship since its establishment by the Ulster Council in 1901. The championship began on 21 June 2015 and ended on 12 July 2015.

Antrim were the defending champions and successfully retained the title following a 1–15 to 1–14 defeat of Down in the final.

== Team changes ==
=== To championship ===
Entered championship

- None

=== From championship ===
Withdrew from championship

- None

== Teams ==
=== General Information ===
Four counties will compete in the Ulster Senior Hurling Championship:

County	Last Provincial Title	Last All-Ireland Title	Position in 2014 Championship	Appearance
Antrim	2014	—	Champions	
Armagh	—	—	Quarter-finals	
Derry	2001	—	Runners-up	
Donegal	1932	—	Quarter-finals	
Down	1997	—	Semi-finals	

== Quarter-finals ==
21 June 2015 Quarter-final	Armagh	3-14 - 5-20	Down	Athletic Grounds
15:30	E McGuinness (2-0), R Gaffney (0-6, 5f,) M Moan (1-0), C Carvill (0-3), D Coulter (0-2), S Gaffney (0-1), J Corvan (0-1), P McKearney (0-1).	Report	C Bailie (2-0), G Johnson (0-6, 4f), F Conway (1-2), M Turley (1-1), James Coyle (1-2), D Toner (0-5), S Dineen (0-2), D McManus (0-1), P Sheehan (0-1).	Referee: É Hassan (Derry)

21 June 2015 Quarter-final	Derry	3-17 - 5-7	Donegal	Celtic Park
15:30	K Hinphey (1-4), A Grant (1-1), B Douban (1-0) P Henry (0-3), R Convery (0-2), D Foley (0-2), M Warnock (0-1), E McGuckin (0-1), J O’Dwyer (0-1), A Kelly (0-1), S McGuigan (0-1),	Report	R McDermott (3-2), K Campbell (2-2), S McVeigh (0-2), E McDermott (0-1).	Referee: J Clarke

== Semi-finals ==
28 June 2015 Semi-final	Derry	1-17 - 3-16	Down	Owenbeg
15:45	P Henry 0-8 (0-7f), K Hinphey 1-1, P Cleary 0-3, A Kelly 0-1, S McGuigan 0- 1, A Grant 0-1, J O’Dwyer 0-1, B Douban 0-1.	Report	G Johnson 1-6 (0-5f), D Toner 1-6 (0-1f), C Bailie 1-1, D McManus 0-1, J Coyle 0-1.	Referee: O Elliott

== Final ==
12 July 2015 Final	Antrim	1-15 - 1-14	Down	Owenbeg
15:30	D McClean (0-06, 6f), C McCann (1-01), C Carson (0-02), R McCambridge (0-01), C McKinley (0-01), J Connolly (0-01, 1f), PJ O’Connell (0-01), D McKernan (0-01), D Traynor (0-01).	Report	G Johnson (1-08, 7f, 1-00pen), P Sheehan (0-01), S Dineen (0-01), C Woods (0-01), D Hughes (0-01), M Ennis (0-01), C Fitzsimmons (0-01).	Attendance: 1,143; Referee: D Hughes (Carlow)

== Top scorers ==
=== Overall ===
Rank	Player	County	Tally	Total	Matches	Average
1	Gareth Johnson	Down	2-20	26	3	8.66
2	Daniel Toner	Down	1-11	14	2	7.00
3	Ronan McDermott	Donegal	3-2	11	1	11.00
3	Kevin Hinphey	Derry	2-5	11	2	5.50
3	Paddy Henry	Derry	0-11	11	2	5.50

=== Single game ===
Rank	Player	County	Tally	Total	Opposition
1	Ronan McDermott	Donegal	3-2	11	Derry
1	Gareth Johnson	Down	1-8	11	Antrim
3	Gareth Johnson	Down	1-6	9	Derry
3	Daniel Toner	Down	1-6	9	Derry
5	Kevin Campbell	Donegal	2-2	8	Derry
5	Paddy Henry	Derry	0-8	8	Down
7	Kevin Hinphey	Derry	1-4	7	Donegal
8	Eoin McGuinness	Armagh	2-0	6	Down
8	Caolan Bailie	Down	2-0	6	Armagh
8	Ryan Gaffney	Armagh	0-6	6	Down
8	Gareth Johnson	Down	0-6	6	Armagh
8	Dessie McClean	Antrim	0-6	6	Down
