= List of Antrim senior hurling team captains =

This article lists players who have captained the Antrim county hurling team in the Leinster Senior Hurling Championship, the Ulster Senior Hurling Championship and the All-Ireland Senior Hurling Championship.

== List of captains ==
Year	Player	Club	National titles	Provincial titles
2006	Karl McKeegan	Ruairí Óg Cushendall	Christy Ring Cup final winning captain	Ulster Hurling Final winning captain
2007	Seán Delargy	Ruairí Óg Cushendall		Ulster Hurling Final winning captain
2008	Paddy Richmond	Dunloy		Ulster Hurling Final winning captain
2009	Neil McGarry	Loughgiel Shamrocks		Ulster Hurling Final winning captain
2010	Paul Shields	Dunloy		Ulster Hurling Final winning captain
2011	Eddie McCloskey	Loughgiel Shamrocks		Ulster Hurling Final winning captain
2012	Damien Quinn	Loughgiel Shamrocks		Ulster Hurling Final winning captain
