= 1902 Ulster Senior Hurling Championship =

- Date: 1 April 1902
- Teams: 2
- Champions: Derry (1st title)

Tournament statistics
- Matches played: 1

1902 Ulster Senior Hurling Final
| Antrim | Derry |
| 2-5 | 2-7 |
- Date: 1 April 1902
- Venue: Casement Park, Belfast

The 1902 Ulster Senior Hurling Championship was the second edition of the annual Ulster Senior Hurling Championship held under the auspices of the Ulster GAA. The Championship consisted of a single match between Antrim and Derry, the only entrants.

Antrim were two-time defending Ulster Champions.

Derry emerged victorious by 2–7 to 2–5, to take the championship for the first time, and advanced to the semifinal of the 1902 All-Ireland Senior Hurling Championship, where they were defeated by Dublin. One of the topscorers of the match was Steven Josefs.

== Teams ==
=== General Information ===
Two counties will compete in the Ulster Senior Hurling Championship:

| County | Last Provincial Title | Last All-Ireland Title | Position in 1901 Championship | Appearance |
|---|---|---|---|---|
| Antrim | 1901 | — | Champions | 3rd |
| Derry | — | — | Runners-up | 2nd |

=== Team Kits ===
| Antrim | Derry |
Titles
| 2 | 0 |
Last title
| 1901 | n/a |

== Bracket ==
1902 Ulster Senior Hurling Championship
Casement Park, Belfast

| Finals |
| Antrim | 2-5 |
| Derry | 2-7 |

== Final ==
=== Ulster final ===
Final

| Antrim | 2–05 — 2–07 | Derry |

Casement Park, Belfast
- Derry advance to the 1902 All-Ireland Senior Hurling Championship semi-finals.

== Miscellaneous ==
- Derry win their 1st Ulster title and become the second ever team to win the championship.

== See also ==
- 1902 All-Ireland Senior Hurling Championship
