= 2012 Ulster Senior Hurling Championship =

- Dates: 17 June 2012 – 8 July 2012
- Teams: 4
- Champions: Antrim (52nd title)

Tournament statistics
- Matches played: 3

The 2012 Ulster Senior Hurling Championship was the 67th installment of the annual Ulster Senior Hurling Championship held under the auspices of the Ulster GAA. Antrim were the defending champions and successfully claimed their eleventh consecutive title, beating finalists Derry.

== Team changes ==
=== To championship ===
Entered championship

- None

=== From championship ===
Withdrew from championship

- Donegal
- Fermanagh
- Monaghan
- Tyrone

== Format ==
The draw for the Ulster championship was seeded, and took place in a single elimination format. Antrim received a bye to the final, down to the semi-final.

There was no entry from the Ulster Championship to the 2012 All-Ireland Senior Hurling Championship proper. Antrim instead entered that competition through the preliminary round of the Leinster Senior Hurling Championship.

The other Ulster teams were not eligible, and took part in the 2012 Christy Ring Cup, the second tier All-Ireland hurling championship. Unlike in 2011, only four teams entered the competition this year.

== Teams ==
Antrim	Armagh	Derry	Down
Titles
51	0	4	4
Last title
2011	n/a	2001	1997

== Bracket ==
Quarter-final; June 17, 2012, Athletic Grounds, Armagh
3	Derry	4-15 (27)
4	Armagh	1-17(20)

Semi-final; July 1, 2012, Casement Park, Belfast
2	Derry	0-24
3	Down	0-13

Final; July 8, 2012, Casement Park, Belfast
1	Antrim	3-18 (27)
Derry	0-9 (9)

== Quarter-finals ==
16 June 2013
3:00pm
Quarter Final

Derry	4-15 - 1-17 (27 - 20)	Armagh

Athletic Grounds, Armagh

== Semi-finals ==
1 July 2012
7:00pm
Semi Final

Derry	0-24 - 0-13 (24-13)	Down
C Quinn (0-01), O McCloskey (0-02), K Hinphey (0-02), P Henry (0-03, 0-01f), P McCloskey (0-01), A Grant (0-04);, P Kelly (0-01), R Convery (0-09, 0-03f), L Craig (0-01).	Report	P Keith (0-02), P Braniff (0-07, 0-03f), M Turley (0-01), S Nicholson (0-02), P Sheehan (0-01).

Casement Park, Belfast
Referee: Patrick Murphy (Carlow)

== Final ==
8 July 2012
3:30pm
Final

Antrim	3-18 - 0-9 (27-9)	Derry
D Quinn; James Campbell, N McGarry, A Graffin; M Herron (0-2), N McAuley, Johnny Campbell, B McAuley (0-2), S McNaughton (1-2); E McCloskey (1-2), C Carson (1-1), P Shiels; L Watson (0-6, 0-5 frees, 0-1 65), N McManus (0-2), B McFall, C McCann (0-1)	Report	D McDermott; S McCullagh, C Quinn, M Warnock; R McCloskey (0-1), L Hinphey, M Craig (0-1); O McCloskey, P Kelly (0-1, 65); A Grant (0-1, free), P McCloskey (0-1), K Hinphey (0-1); C McKaigue, R Convery (0-1, free), P Henry (0-2, 0-1 free).

Casement Park, Belfast
Referee: T Carroll (Offaly).
