= 2018 Ulster Senior Hurling Championship =

- Dates: Cancelled for 2018
- Teams: 4 Championship; 4 Shield

The 2018 Ulster Senior Hurling Championship was to be the 70th staging of the Ulster hurling championship since its establishment by the Ulster Council in 1901. In January 2018 it was announced that the Ulster championship was to be cancelled for three years.

The tournament was to be played in April, instead of the usual June/July dates.

== Format ==
The two-tier format introduced in 2016 continues.

In the first tier, the Ulster Senior Hurling Championship, Antrim, Armagh, Derry and Down compete in a knock-out format. The winners receive the Liam Harvey Cup. The two teams beaten in the first round of the Championship play off, with the losing team relegated to the Shield for 2019.

In the second tier, the Ulster Senior Hurling Shield, Donegal, Fermanagh, Monaghan and Tyrone compete in a knock-out format, with the winner gaining promotion to the first tier for 2019.

Cavan do not participate.

== Teams ==
Antrim	Armagh	Derry	Down
Titles
57	0	4	4
Last title
2017	n/a	2001	1997
