= 2007 Nicky Rackard Cup =

- Dates: 23 June – 12 August 2007
- Teams: 12
- Champions: Roscommon (1st title)
- Runners-up: Armagh

Tournament statistics
- Matches played: 19

The 2007 Nicky Rackard Cup began in June 2007. It was the third time this element of the All-Ireland Senior Hurling Championship was played. Both Roscommon and Armagh easily progressed to the final in Croke Park, averaging winning margins of 23 and 14 points respectively in the early rounds. In a tense final, the Rossies ran out two-point winners, substitute Gary Fallon scoring the crucial goal. Report

== Format ==
Twelve teams participated in the 2007 Nicky Rackard Cup.

- Group 3A: Armagh, Sligo, Tyrone
- Group 3B: Donegal, Leitrim, Longford
- Group 3C: Fermanagh, Monaghan, Roscommon
- Group 3D: Cavan, Louth, Warwickshire

Top two in each group advanced to quarter-finals.

== Team changes ==
=== To Championship ===
Relegated from the Christy Ring Cup

- Roscommon

=== From Championship ===
Promoted to the Christy Ring Cup

- Derry

== Teams ==
=== General Information ===
County	Last Cup title	Last Provincial Title	Last All-Ireland Title	Position in 2006 Championship	Appearance
Armagh	—	—	—	Semi-finals	3rd
Cavan	—	—	—	Group Stage	3rd
Donegal	—	1932	—	Runners-up	3rd
Fermanagh	—	—	—	Group Stage	3rd
Leitrim	—	—	—	Group Stage	3rd
Longford	—	—	—	Semi-finals	3rd
Louth	—	—	—	Quarter-finals	3rd
Monaghan	—	1915	—	Group Stage	3rd
Roscommon	—	1913	—	Lost relegation playoff (Christy Ring Cup)	1st
Sligo	—	—	—	Quarter-finals	3rd
Tyrone	—	—	—	Group Stage	3rd
Warwickshire	—	—	—	Group Stage	3rd

== Group stage ==
=== Group 3A ===
Date	Venue	Home	Score	Away	Score
23 June	Markiewicz Park, Sligo	Sligo	1-05	Armagh	1-19
30 June	Keady	Armagh	2-13	Tyrone	1-9
7 July	Omagh	Tyrone	3-13	Sligo	0-15

Table	P	W	D	L	F	A	+/-	Pts
Armagh	2	2	0	0	3-32	2-14	+21	4
Tyrone	2	1	0	1	4-22	2-28	0	2
Sligo	2	0	0	2	1-20	4-32	-21	0

=== Group 3B ===
Date	Venue	Home	Score	Away	Score
23 June	Ballinamore	Leitrim	1-12	Longford	2-12
30 June	Pearse Park, Longford	Longford	0-12	Donegal	0-16
7 July	O' Donnell Park, Letterkenny	Donegal	2-22	Leitrim	2-04

Table	P	W	D	L	F	A	+/-	Pts
Donegal	2	2	0	0	2-38	2-16	+22	4
Longford	2	1	0	1	2-24	1-28	-1	2
Leitrim	2	0	0	2	3-16	4-34	-21	0

=== Group 3C ===
Date	Venue	Home	Score	Away	Score
23 June	Athleague	Roscommon	7-27	Fermanagh	1-06
30 June	Lisnaskea	Fermanagh	2-11	Monaghan	2-14
7 July	St. Tiernach's Park, Clones	Monaghan	0-14	Roscommon	2-21

Table	P	W	D	L	F	A	+/-	Pts
Roscommon	2	2	0	0	9-48	1-20	+58	4
Monaghan	2	1	0	1	4-32	2-28	-15	2
Fermanagh	2	0	0	2	3-17	9-41	-48	0

=== Group 3D ===
Date	Venue	Home	Score	Away	Score
23 June	Páirc na hÉireann, Solihull	Warwickshire	3-08	Louth	1-22
30 June	Dowdallshill	Louth	0-17	Cavan	0-7
7 July	Kingspan Breffni Park, Cavan	Cavan	0-07	Warwickshire	2-15

Table	P	W	D	L	F	A	+/-	Pts
Louth	2	2	0	0	1-39	3-15	+18	4
Warwickshire	2	1	0	1	5-23	1-29	+6	2
Cavan	2	0	0	2	0-14	2-32	-24	0

== Knockout stage ==
=== Quarter-finals ===
14 July 2007
Quarter-final

Armagh	2–19 — 1–09	Tyrone

Keady, Armagh
14 July 2007
Quarter-final

Donegal	2–14 — 2–08	Longford

O'Donnell Park, Letterkenny
14 July 2007
Quarter-final

Louth	4–25 — 1–03	Warwickshire

Drogheda
14 July 2007
Quarter-final

Roscommon	4–20 — 1–08	Monaghan

Athleague

=== Semi-finals ===
21 July 2007
Semi-final

Armagh	3–28 — 2–10	Donegal

Keady, Armagh
21 July 2007
Semi-final

Louth	0–05 — 2–13	Roscommon

Drogheda

=== Nicky Rackard Cup Final ===
12 August 2007
Final

Armagh	0–13 — 1–12	Roscommon
	Report

Croke Park, Dublin
- Roscommon and Armagh are promoted to the 2008 Christy Ring Cup.

== See also ==
- 2007 All-Ireland Senior Hurling Championship
- 2007 Ulster Senior Hurling Championship
- 2007 Christy Ring Cup
