= List of hurling managers =

This is a list of hurling managers. It includes managers currently managing a county team in all levels.

== Managers ==
| County Team | Name(s) | Tier | Appointed | Time as manager |
|---|---|---|---|---|
| Antrim | Davy Fitzgerald | Joe McDonagh Cup | 12 August 2024 | 1 year, 36 days |
| Armagh | Karl McKeegan | Nicky Rackard Cup | 11 October 2022 | 2 years, 341 days |
| Carlow | Tom Mullally | Joe McDonagh Cup | 21 January 2021 | 4 years, 239 days |
| Cavan | Ollie Bellew | Lory Meagher Cup | 13 December 2019 | 5 years, 278 days |
| Clare | Brian Lohan | All-Ireland Senior Hurling Championship | 31 October 2019 | 5 years, 321 days |
| Cork | Ben O'Connor | All-Ireland Senior Hurling Championship | 2 September 2025 | 15 days |
| Derry | Johnny McGarvey | Christy Ring Cup | 4 January 2023 | 2 years, 256 days |
| Donegal | Mickey McCann | Christy Ring Cup | 25 October 2017 | 7 years, 327 days |
| Down | Ronan Sheehan | Joe McDonagh Cup | 2018 | |
| Dublin | Niall Ó Ceallacháin | All-Ireland Senior Hurling Championship | 11 September 2024 | 1 year, 6 days |
| Fermanagh | Joe Baldwin | Lory Meagher Cup | 20 November 2019 | 5 years, 301 days |
| Galway | Micheál Donoghue | All-Ireland Senior Hurling Championship | 2 September 2024 | 1 year, 15 days |
| Kerry | John Griffin | Christy Ring Cup | 27 August 2024 | 1 year, 21 days |
| Kildare | Brian Dowling | All-Ireland Senior Hurling Championship | 7 September 2023 | 2 years, 10 days |
| Kilkenny | Derek Lyng | All-Ireland Senior Hurling Championship | 4 August 2022 | 3 years, 44 days |
| Lancashire | Liam Óg Knocker | Lory Meagher Cup | 2023 | |
| Laois | Tommy Fitzgerald | Joe McDonagh Cup | 22 November 2024 | 299 days |
| Leitrim | Mike Wall | Lory Meagher Cup | 11 October 2024 | 341 days |
| Limerick | John Kiely | All-Ireland Senior Hurling Championship | 13 September 2016 | 9 years, 4 days |
| London | Neil Rogers | Joe McDonagh Cup | 6 December 2023 | 1 year, 285 days |
| Longford | Diarmuid Cahill | Lory Meagher Cup | 22 December 2024 | 269 days |
| Louth | Trevor Hilliard | Nicky Rackard Cup | 27 November 2023 | 1 year, 294 days |
| Mayo | Ray Larkin | Nicky Rackard Cup | 3 September 2024 | 1 year, 14 days |
| Meath | Johnny Greville | Christy Ring Cup | 13 September 2024 | 1 year, 4 days |
| Monaghan | Arthur Hughes | Lory Meagher Cup | 2022 | |
| New York | Richie Hartnett | Nicky Rackard Cup | 24 November 2022 | 2 years, 297 days |
| Offaly | Johnny Kelly | All-Ireland Senior Hurling Championship | 6 September 2022 | 3 years, 11 days |
| Tipperary | Liam Cahill | All-Ireland Senior Hurling Championship | 18 July 2022 | 3 years, 61 days |
| Tyrone | Stephen McGarry | Nicky Rackard Cup | 23 August 2023 | 2 years, 25 days |
| Roscommon | Vacant | Christy Ring Cup | | |
| Sligo | Stephen Sheil | Nicky Rackard Cup | 6 October 2023 | 1 year, 346 days |
| Warwickshire | Tony Joyce | Lory Meagher Cup | 22 December 2023 | 1 year, 269 days |
| Waterford | Peter Queally | All-Ireland Senior Hurling Championship | 10 August 2024 | 1 year, 38 days |
| Westmeath | Kevin O'Brien | Joe McDonagh Cup | 13 August 2025 | 35 days |
| Wexford | Keith Rossiter | All-Ireland Senior Hurling Championship | 18 August 2023 | 2 years, 30 days |
| Wicklow | Jonathan O'Neill | Christy Ring Cup | 29 January 2024 | 2 years, 231 days |

== See also ==
- Manager (Gaelic games)
- List of Gaelic football managers
