= Ciaran Barr =

Irish hurler

Personal information
- Native name: Ciarán Ó Bairr (Irish)
- Born: Belfast, County Antrim

Sport
- Sport: Hurling
- Position: Forward
Club
- Years: Club
- O'Donovan Rossa
Inter-county
Years	County	Apps (scores)
1984-1994	Antrim	12 (5-8)
Inter-county titles
- Ulster titles: 5
- All-Irelands: 0
- All Stars: 1

Ciaran Barr (born 1964 in Belfast, County Antrim) is a former Irish sportsperson. He played hurling with his local club O'Donovan Rossa and with the Antrim senior inter-county team from 1984 until 1994. He won an All Star award in 1988.

== Playing career ==
=== Club ===
Barr played his club hurling with his local O'Donovan Rossa club and enjoyed some success. He won a senior county title with the club in 1988. It was the club's first county championship victory in eleven years. He also played with the St Vincents GAA club in Dublin and won a Senior Hurling Championship with them in 1993.

=== Inter-county ===
Barr first came to prominence on the inter-county scene with Antrim in the early 1980s. He played for the county minor team, but he enjoyed little success as Antrim played in the Leinster Championship during this period. Barr later won several Ulster titles with the Antrim under-21 team.

Barr made his debut with the Antrim senior hurling team in 1984, but he enjoyed little success in his first few seasons. In 1989 the Ulster Senior Hurling Championship was revived after a forty-year absence. That year Barr was the captain of the team and Antrim reached the final where Down provided the opposition. A 2-16 to 0-9 victory gave Barr his first senior Ulster title. Antrim later defeated Kildare in the All-Ireland quarter-final before lining out against Offaly in the penultimate game of the championship in Croke Park. Offaly were the red hot favourites going into the game, but Barr's side had other ideas. Antrim shocked their opponents and won the game by 4-15 to 1-15. Offaly, in spite of losing, recognised the historic nature of the victory and gave Antrim a guard of honour as the team left the field. The 1989 All-Ireland final saw Antrim take on Tipperary for the first time since 1949. Antrim, however, were unable to repeat the heroics of the semi-final and lost to Tipp by 4-24 to 3-9.

In 1990 Barr added a second Ulster title to his collection following another defeat of Down. The subsequent All-Ireland semi-final saw Antrim take on Cork, but victory went to 'the Rebels' on that occasion by 2-20 to 1-13.

Antrim made it three-in-a-row in Ulster in 1991 with Barr collecting his third provincial medal. Westmeath fell in the subsequent All-Ireland quarter-final, setting up a semi-final meeting with Kilkenny. With seconds left in the game Barr's side were up by one point, but a last-gasp goal gave Kilkenny a 2-18 to 1-19 victory.

Antrim lost their provincial crown in 1992, but Barr collected a fourth Ulster title in 1993. Antrim later defeated Meath in the All-Ireland quarter-final setting up a semi-final meeting with Kilkenny once again. However, Antrim were not the force they were and they lost the game by 4-18 to 1-9.

Barr added a fifth Ulster title to his collection in 1994 following a defeat of Down in the sixth successive meeting between these two sides in the final. Unfortunately, Antrim were later trounced by Limerick in the All-Ireland semi-final. Barr retired from inter-county hurling shortly afterwards.

=== Provincial ===
Barr also lined out with Ulster in the inter-provincial hurling competition. He played in a number of finals, though he never won a Railway Cup medal.

Sporting positions
Preceded by	Antrim Senior Hurling Captain; 1989	Succeeded by
Preceded by	Dublin Under-21 Hurling Manager; 2009	Succeeded by Richard Stakelum
