= Aidan McCarry =

Irish hurler (born 1963)

Personal information
- Born: Loughguile, County Antrim
- Occupation: Bricklayer
- Height: 6 ft 0 in (183 cm)

Sport
- Sport: Hurling
- Position: Centre-back
Club
- Years: Club
- 1970s-1990s: Loughgiel Shamrocks
Club titles
- Antrim titles: 2
- Ulster titles: 2
- All-Ireland Titles: 1
Inter-county
- Years: County
- 1980s-1990s: Antrim
Inter-county titles
- Ulster titles: 3
- All-Irelands: 0
- NHL: 0
- All Stars: 0

Aidan McCarry (born 1963 in Loughguile, County Antrim) is an Irish retired sportsperson. He played hurling with his local club Loughgiel Shamrocks and was a member of the Antrim senior inter-county team in the 1980s and 1990s.
