= Seán Delargy =

Irish hurler

Personal information
- Native name: Seán Ó Duílearga (Irish)
- Born: 1982 (age 43–44) Cushendall, County Antrim, Northern Ireland
- Occupation: Painter
- Height: 5 ft 9 in (175 cm)

Sport
- Sport: Hurling
- Position: Left corner-back
Club
- Years: Club
- Ruairí Óg Cushendall
Club titles
- Antrim titles: 3
- Ulster titles: 2
- All-Ireland Titles: 0
Inter-county
- Years: County
- 2002-2011: Antrim
Inter-county titles
- Ulster titles: 5
- All-Irelands: 0
- NHL: 0
- All Stars: 0

Seán Delargy (born 1982) is a Northern Irish hurler who played as a left corner-back for the Antrim senior team.

Delargy made his first appearance for the team during the 2002 National League and was a regular member of the starting fifteen until his retirement after the 2011 championship. During that time he won five Ulster winners' medals.

At club level Delargy is a two-time Ulster medalist with Ruairí Óg Cushendall. In addition to this he has also won three county championship winners' medals.

Sporting positions
| Preceded by Karl McKeegan | Antrim Senior Hurling Captain; 2007 | Succeeded by Paddy Richmond |
