= Paddy Richmond =

Irish hurler

Personal information
- Native name: Pádraig de Riseamann (Irish)
- Born: 1980 (age 45–46) Dunloy, County Antrim, Northern Ireland
- Occupation: Plumber
- Height: 6 ft 1 in (185 cm)

Sport
- Sport: Hurling
- Position: Full-forward
Club
- Years: Club
- Dunloy
Club titles
- Antrim titles: 8
- Ulster titles: 7
- All-Ireland Titles: 0
Inter-county
- Years: County
- 2002-2009: Antrim
Inter-county titles
- Ulster titles: 7
- All-Irelands: 0
- NHL: 0
- All Stars: 0

Paddy Richmond (born 1980) is an Irish hurler who played as a left corner-back for the Antrim senior team.

Richmond made his first appearance for the team during the 2002 National League and was a regular member of the starting fifteen until his retirement after the 2009 championship. During that time he won one Christy Ring Cup winners' medal, seven Ulster winners' medals and a National League (Division 2) winners' medal.

At club level Richmond is a seven-time Ulster medalist with Dunloy. In addition to this he has also won eight county championship winners' medals.

Sporting positions
Preceded by Seán Delargy	Antrim Senior Hurling Captain; 2008	Succeeded by Neil McGarry
