= Neil McGarry =

Irish hurler

Personal information
- Native name: Niall Mag Fhearaigh (Irish)
- Born: 1983 (age 42–43) Loughguile, County Antrim; Northern Ireland

Sport
- Sport: Hurling
- Position: Full-back
Club
- Years: Club
- 2001-present: Loughgiel Shamrocks
Club titles
- Antrim titles: 2
- Ulster titles: 2
- All-Ireland Titles: 1
Inter-county*
Years	County	Apps (scores)
2008-2009	Antrim	3 (0-00)
Inter-county titles
- Ulster titles: 2
- All-Irelands: 0
- NHL: 0
- All Stars: 0
- *Inter County team apps and scores correct as of 17:53, 7 July 2012.

Neil McGarry (born 1983) is an Irish hurler who currently plays as a full-forward for the Antrim senior team.

McGarry made his first appearance for the team during the 2008 National League and was a regular member of the starting fifteen for the following two seasons. During that time he won two Ulster medals.

At club level McGarry is an All-Ireland medalist with Loughgiel Shamrocks. He has also won two Ulster medals and two county club championship medals.

Sporting positions
Preceded by Paddy Richmond	Antrim Senior Hurling Captain; 2009	Succeeded by Paul Shields
