= 2008 Ulster Senior Hurling Championship =

- Dates: 17 May 2008 – 8 July 2008
- Teams: 10
- Champions: Antrim (48th title)

Tournament statistics
- Matches played: 9

The 2008 Ulster Senior Hurling Championship was the 63rd installment of the annual Ulster Senior Hurling Championship held under the auspices of the Ulster GAA. Antrim were the defending champions and successfully claimed their ninth consecutive title, beating finalists Down.

== Format ==
The draw for the Ulster championship was seeded and took place in a staggered single elimination format. Antrim and Down received byes until the semifinal, Armagh and Derry to the quarterfinal, and London and Donegal to the second round. All four other teams entered in the first round.

This was the last year where a winning team was granted entry from the Ulster Championship to the 2008 All-Ireland Senior Hurling Championship proper. Antrim entered that competition through the Qualifier series. From 2009 onwards, the Ulster championship continued as astandalonee tournament.

The other Ulster teams took part in lower-tier competitions, such as the 2008 Christy Ring Cup, the second-tier All-Ireland hurling championship.

The number of teams in the championship grew enormously since 2007. The entry for 2008, ten, was a record, and for many marked a first foray back into senior championship hurling. All nine historic counties of Ulster took part, in addition to London.

To avoid mismatches, the draw was set so that the weaker counties were not faced with the prospect of facing regional powers Antrim or Down at an early stage; instead, all the other counties took part in a series of elimination matches for the right to meet Antrim or Down in the semifinal.

== Team changes ==
=== To Championship ===
Re entered championship

- Cavan
- Donegal
- Fermanagh
- Monaghan
- Tyrone

=== From championship ===
Withdrew from the championship

- None

== Teams ==
=== General Information ===
Ten counties will compete in the Ulster Senior Hurling Championship:

County	Last Provincial Title	Last All-Ireland Title	Position in 2007 Championship	Appearance
Antrim	2006	—	Champions	
Armagh	—	—	Quarter-finals	
Derry	2001	—	Semi-finals	
Down	1997	—	Runners-up	
Cavan	—	—	—	
Donegal	1932	—	—	
Fermanagh	—	—	—	
London	—	1901	Semi-finals	
Monaghan	1915	—	—	
Tyrone	—	—	—	

=== Personnel and kits ===
County	Manager	Captain(s)	Sponsor
Antrim			
Armagh			
Derry			
Down			
Cavan			
Donegal			
Fermanagh			
London			
Monaghan			
Tyrone			

=== Team statistics ===
Antrim	Armagh	Derry	Down	Cavan
Titles
47	0	4	4	0
Last title
2007	n/a	2001	1997	n/a
Fermanagh	Tyrone	Monaghan	Donegal	London
Titles
0	0	2	3	0
Last title
n/a	n/a	1915	1932	n/a

== Bracket ==
Premiliminary Round
Tyrone	1-11 (14)
Fermanagh	2-7 (13)
Monaghan	2-15 (21)
Cavan	1-16 (19)

Second round Quarterfinals
London	2-23 (29)
Armagh	4-16 (28)
London	2-13 (19)
Tyrone	1-6 (9)
Donegal	1-14 (17)
Monaghan	1-15 (18)
Derry	7-23 (44)
Monaghan	3-13(22)

Semifinals
London	1-16 (19)
Down	4-16 (28)
Antrim	2-17 (23)
Derry	1-12 (15)

Ulster SHC Final
Antrim	3-18 (27)
Down	2-16 (22)

== First Round ==
May 11
1st Round

Cavan	1-16 - 2-15	Monaghan

Breffni Park, Cavan

May 11
1st Round

Tyrone	1-11 - 2-7	Fermanagh

Brewster Park, Enniskillen

== Second Round ==
May 18
2nd Round

Donegal	1-14 - 1-15	Monaghan

St Tiernach's Park, Clones

May 18
2nd Round

London	2-13 - 1-6	Tyrone

Healy Park, Omagh

== Quarter-finals ==
May 24
Quarter-final

Armagh	4-16 - 2-23	London

Páirc Esler, Newry

May 25
Quarter-final

Derry	7-23 - 3-13	Monaghan

Celtic Park, Derry

== Semi-finals ==
June 1
Semi-final

Down	4-16 - 1-16	London

Casement Park, Belfast

June 1
Semi-final

Antrim	2-17 - 1-12	Derry

Casement Park, Belfast

== Final ==
June 15
Final

Down	2-16 - 3-18	Antrim

Casement Park, Belfast

== See also ==
- 2008 All-Ireland Senior Hurling Championship
- 2008 Christy Ring Cup
- 2008 Nicky Rackard Cup
