= Eddie McCloskey =

Irish hurler

Charlie Henry
Personal information
- Native name: Adam Manníng (Irish)
- Born: 1988 (age 37–38) Loughguile, County Antrim
- Height: 5 ft 11 in (180 cm)

Sport
- Sport: Hurling
- Position: wing half forward
Club
- Years: Club
- 2006-present: Loughgiel Shamrocks
Club titles
- Antrim titles: 4
- Ulster titles: 4
- All-Ireland Titles: 1
Inter-county
- Years: County
- 2007-present: Antrim
Inter-county titles
- Ulster titles: 4
- Leinster titles: 0
- All-Irelands: 0
- NHL: 0
- All Stars: 0

Eddie McCloskey (born 1988 in Loughguile, County Antrim) is a sportsperson from Northern Ireland. He plays hurling with his local club Loughgiel Shamrocks and has been a member of the Antrim senior inter-county team since2007 until 2011

Sporting positions
Preceded by Paul Shields	Antrim Senior Hurling Captain; 2011	Succeeded by Damien Quinn
