= Damien Quinn (hurler) =

Irish hurler

Personal information
- Native name: Damien Ó Coinne (Irish)
- Nickname: D. D.
- Born: 1980 (age 45–46) Loughguile, County Antrim, Northern Ireland

Sport
- Sport: Hurling
- Position: Goalkeeper
Club
- Years: Club
- 1998-present: Loughgiel Shamrocks
Club titles
- Antrim titles: 3
- Ulster titles: 3
- All-Ireland Titles: 1
Inter-county
- Years: County
- 2001-2006 2012: Antrim; Antrim
Inter-county titles
- Ulster titles: 6
- Leinster titles: 0
- All-Irelands: 0
- NHL: 0
- All Stars: 0

Damien Quinn (born 1980) is an Irish hurler who currently plays as a goalkeeper and captain of the Antrim senior team.

Quinn made his first appearance for the team during the 2000 championship and became a regular player over subsequent seasons until 2007. In 2012 Quinn returned to the Antrim panel as captain. During that time he has won six Ulster winners' medals and one Christy Ring Cup winners' medal.

At club level Quinn is an All-Ireland medalist with Loughgiel Shamrocks. In addition to this he has also won two Ulster medals and two county club championship medals.

Sporting positions
Preceded by Eddie McCloskey	Antrim Senior Hurling Captain; 2012	Succeeded by Incumbent
