= List of Gaelic football managers =

This is a list of Gaelic football managers. It includes managers currently managing a county team in all levels.

== Managers ==
County Team	Name(s)	Province	Appointed	Time as manager
Antrim	Mark Doran	Ulster	20 August 2025	66 days
Armagh	Kieran McGeeney	Ulster	28 August 2014	11 years, 58 days
Carlow	Joe Murphy	Leinster	31 March 2025	208 days
Cavan	Dermot McCabe	Ulster	12 August 2025	74 days
Clare	Paul Madden	Munster	12 August 2025	74 days
Cork	John Cleary	Munster	22 July 2022	3 years, 95 days
Derry	Ciarán Meenagh	Ulster	24 July 2025	93 days
Donegal	Jim McGuinness	Ulster	22 August 2023	2 years, 64 days
Down	Conor Laverty	Ulster	8 August 2022	3 years, 78 days
Dublin	Ger Brennan	Leinster	8 August 2025	78 days
Fermanagh	Vacant	Ulster		
Galway	Pádraic Joyce	Connacht	5 November 2019	5 years, 354 days
Kerry	Jack O'Connor	Munster	24 September 2021	4 years, 31 days
Kildare	Brian Flanagan	Leinster	3 September 2024	1 year, 52 days
Laois	Justin McNulty	Leinster	19 October 2023	2 years, 6 days
Leitrim	Steven Poacher	Connacht	26 October 2024	364 days
Limerick	Jimmy Lee	Munster	20 August 2023	2 years, 66 days
London	Michael Maher	Connacht	15 October 2019	6 years, 10 days
Longford	Mike Solan	Leinster	27 August 2024	1 year, 59 days
Louth	Gavin Devlin	Leinster	22 July 2025	95 days
Mayo	Andy Moran	Connacht	14 August 2025	72 days
Meath	Robbie Brennan	Leinster	19 September 2024	1 year, 36 days
Monaghan	Gabriel Bannigan	Ulster	19 September 2024	1 year, 36 days
New York	Ronan McGinley	Connacht	27 September 2024	1 year, 28 days
Offaly	Mickey Harte; Declan Kelly	Leinster	19 August 2024	1 year, 67 days
Tipperary	Vacant			
Tyrone	Malachy O'Rourke	Ulster	10 September 2024	1 year, 45 days
Roscommon	Mark Dowd	Connacht	16 August 2025	70 days
Sligo	Dessie Sloyan; Eamonn O'Hara	Connacht	30 July 2025	87 days
Waterford	Ephie Fitzgerald	Munster	26 August 2025	60 days
Westmeath	Mark McHugh	Leinster	9 September 2025	46 days
Wexford	John Hegarty	Leinster	10 September 2022	3 years, 45 days
Wicklow	Oisín McConville	Leinster	2 September 2022	3 years, 53 days

== See also ==
- Manager (Gaelic games)
- List of hurling managers
