= Olcan McFetridge =

Irish hurler (born 1963)

Personal information
- Nickname: Clute
- Born: Armoy, County Antrim
- Occupation: Bricklayer
- Height: 5 ft 9 in (175 cm)

Sport
- Sport: Hurling
- Position: Left wing-forward
Clubs
- Years: Club
- 1980s-1990s: Armoy Glen Rovers and Loughgeile shamrocks
Club titles
- Antrim titles: 0
Inter-county
- Years: County
- 1980s-1990s: Antrim
Inter-county titles
- Ulster titles: 1
- All-Irelands: 0
- NHL: Division two champion
- All Stars: 1

Olcan McFetridge (born 1963 in Armoy, County Antrim) is an Irish former sportsperson. He played hurling with his local club Armoy and was a member of the Antrim senior inter-county team in the 1980s and 1990s.
