= Jimmy Walsh (Antrim hurler) =

Irish hurler

Personal information
- Native name: Séamus Breathnach (Irish)
- Born: 1911 Belfast, County Antrim
- Died: March 13, 2008

Sport
- Sport: Hurling
- Position: Centre-back
Club
- Years: Club
- O'Connell's
Club titles
- Antrim titles: 7
Inter-county
- Years: County
- 1930s-1940s: Antrim
Inter-county titles
- Ulster titles: 1
- NHL: 1

Jimmy Walsh (1911 – 13 March 2008) was an Irish sportsman. He played hurling with his local club O'Connell's and with the Antrim senior inter-county team in the 1930s and 1940s. He was born in Belfast, County Antrim.

== Playing career ==
=== Club ===
Walsh played his club hurling with his local O'Connell's club in Belfast and enjoyed much success. He won his first senior county title in 1930 before adding two more county medals to his collection in 1932 and 1936. Walsh added another county title to his collection in 1940. It was the first of three county wins in-a-row for the O’Connell's club. He won a seventh county medal in 1945.

=== Inter-county ===
Walsh first came to prominence with the Antrim inter-county team in the 1930s. Antrim, however, were the hurling standard-bearers in Ulster and faced little competition as they participated in the All-Ireland Junior Hurling Championship. The explosion of World War II meant that the GAA suspended the All-Ireland minor and junior championships. This meant that Antrim were left without any competition.

In 1943 the team were allowed to enter the All-Ireland Senior Hurling Championship for the first time since 1925. Little was expected of the team that was captained by Walsh. Antrim's first senior championship outing was an All-Ireland quarter-final with Galway at Corrigan Park in Belfast. There was mild surprise when Antrim emerged as the winners by 7–0 to 6–2. The subsequent All-Ireland semi-final saw Kilkenny travel to Belfast to take on Antrim. What transpired in Corrigan Park turned out to be one of the most shocking results in the history of the All-Ireland championship. Walsh's side took a half-time lead of 2–2 to 1-3 and hung on in the second-half. Antrim finally came through by 3–3 to 1–6. For the first time ever a team from the northern province would compete in the All-Ireland final. Cork, the champions of the previous two years, provided the opposition as up to 50,000 people traveled to Croke Park. The economic reality of the Emergency saw an unusual exchange take place prior to the game as Walsh presented a quantity of butter to Cork captain Mick Kennefick, who in turn handed over tea to his opposite number. The game, however, turned into a rout. Cork took a 3–11 to 0–2 lead at half-time and went on to claim the three-in-a-row on a score line of 5–16 to 0–4.

Antrim lined out in the All-Ireland senior championship for the next few seasons, however, the team was defeated in the semi-final on each occasion. Walsh retired from inter-county hurling shortly afterwards.

Sporting positions
Preceded by	Antrim Senior Hurling Captain; 1943	Succeeded by
