= Paul Shiels =

Irish hurler

Personal information
- Born: Dunloy, County Antrim, Northern Ireland
- Height: 6 ft 0 in (183 cm)

Sport
- Sport: Hurling
- Position: Midfield
Club
- Years: Club
- Dunloy
Club titles
- Antrim titles: 2
- Ulster titles: 2
- All-Ireland Titles: 0
Inter-county*
Years	County	Apps (scores)
2007-present	Antrim	28 (2-83)
Inter-county titles
- Ulster titles: 4
- All-Irelands: 0
- NHL: 0
- All Stars: 0
- *Inter County team apps and scores correct as of 01:11, 1 July 2014.

Paul Shiels is a hurler from County Antrim, Northern Ireland, who plays as a midfielder for the Antrim senior team.

Shiels made his first appearance for the team during the 2007 National League and immediately became a regular member of the starting fifteen. Since then he has won four Ulster winners' medal.

At club level Shiels is a two-time Ulster medalist with Dunloy. In addition to this he has also won two county club championship winners' medals.

Sporting positions
Preceded by Neil McGarry	Antrim Senior Hurling Captain; 2010	Succeeded by Eddie McCloskey
