= 2013 Ulster Senior Hurling Championship =

- Dates: 16 June 2013 – 8 July 2013
- Teams: 4
- Champions: Antrim (53rd title)

Tournament statistics
- Matches played: 4

The 2013 Ulster Senior Hurling Championship was the 68th installment of the annual Ulster Senior Hurling Championship held under the auspices of the Ulster GAA. Antrim were the defending champions, and secured their twelfth consecutive title in a much delayed final played against Down on 2 February 2014.

The delays, which arose from a fixture clash caused by a semi-final draw between Down and Derry, and exacerbated by a ban on inter-county training in the winter of 2013, was heavily criticised for undermining the competition. The winners, Antrim, in fact never played a single match of the 2013 Championship in 2013, having progressed automatically to the final.

== Team changes ==
=== To championship ===
Entered championship

- None

=== From championship ===
Withdrew from championship

- None

== Format ==
As the Ulster championship is of a lower standard than its Leinster and Munster counterparts, there was no entry from the Ulster Championship to the All-Ireland Championship proper. Antrim will instead enter that competition through the preliminary round of the Leinster Senior Hurling Championship.

The other Ulster teams are not eligible, and took part in the Christy Ring Cup, the second tier All-Ireland hurling championship, Down winning the competition.

== Teams ==
=== General Information ===
Four counties will compete in the Ulster Senior Hurling Championship:

County	Last Provincial Title	Last All-Ireland Title	Position in 2012 Championship	Appearance
Antrim	2012	—	Champions	
Armagh	—	—	Quarter-finals	
Derry	2001	—	Runners-up	
Down	1997	—	Semi-finals	

=== Team kits ===
Antrim	Armagh	Derry	Down
Titles
52	0	4	4
Last title
2012	n/a	2001	1997

== Bracket ==
The draw for the Ulster championship is seeded, and takes place in a single elimination format. Antrim receive a bye to the final, Derry to the semi-final.

Quarter-final; 16 June 2013, Páirc Esler, Newry
3	Down	3-20 (29)
4	Armagh	1-11 (14)

Semi-final; 30 June 2013, Athletic Grounds, Armagh replay - 7 July 2013, Athletic Grounds, Armagh
2	Derry	0-19 (19) (r) 1-16 (19)
3	Down	1-16 (19) (r) 0-25 (25)

Final; 2 February 2014, Celtic Park, Derry
1	Antrim	4-21 (33)
3	Down	1-17 (21)

== Quarter-finals ==
=== Quarter-final match ===
16 June 2013
3:00pm
Quarter Final

Down	3-20 - 1-11 (29 - 14)	Armagh
C McFadden 1-3 (2f), R Wherity 1-0, M Murphy 0-3 (2f), P McBrearty 0-2, R Kavanagh, David Walsh 0-1 each.	Report	M Donnelly, S Cavanagh (1f) 0-2 each, N Morgan (1f), J McMahon, C Cavanagh, S O'Neill, C McAliskey, K Coney 0-1 each.

Páirc Esler, Newry

== Semi-finals ==
=== Semi-final match ===
30 June 2013
7:00pm
Semi Final

Derry	0-19 - 1-16 (19 - 19)	Down
O McCloskey (0-2), K Hinphey (0-4), A Grant (0-1), P Henry (0-2), P Cleary (0-1), A Kelly (0-5, one free), C Convery (0-1), T McCloskey (0-3, frees).	Report	D Hughes (0-2), S Nicholson (0-1), P Braniff (0-7, five frees), P Sheehan (0-2), D Toner (1-1), G Johnson (0-1), J McCusker (0-1), M Turley (0-1).

Athletic Grounds, Armagh
Referee: James Clarke, Cavan

=== Semi-final replay ===
July 7, 2013
3:30pm
Semi Final replay

Derry	1-16 - 0-25 (19 - 25)	Down
K Hinphey (0-2), B Rodgers (0-1), A Grant (0-1, f), T McCloskey (0-2, 1f), A Kelly (1-0), M Craig (0-3), P Henry (0-7, 4f)	Report	D Hughes (0-5), K McGarry (0-2), P Braniff (0-12, 8f), P Sheehan (0-1), J Coyle (0-3), M Turley (0-1), J McCusker (0-1)

Athletic Grounds, Armagh
Referee: Tony Carroll (Offaly)

== Final ==
The final was originally scheduled for 7 July 2013 but was postponed to allow the semi-final replay between Down and Derry to take place on that day. The final was rescheduled for 3 November 2013, and finally 2 February 2014.

2 February 2014
Final

Antrim	4-21 - 1-17 (33) - (21)	Down
	Report

Celtic Park, Derry
Attendance: 139
