= 2009 Ulster Senior Hurling Championship =

- Dates: 17 May 2009 – 8 July 2009
- Teams: 10
- Champions: Antrim (49th title)

Tournament statistics
- Matches played: 9

The 2009 Ulster Senior Hurling Championship was the 64th installment of the annual Ulster Senior Hurling Championship held under the auspices of the Ulster GAA. Antrim were the defending champions and successfully claimed their ninth consecutive title, beating finalists Down.

== Team changes ==
=== To championship ===
Entered championship

- None

=== From championship ===
Withdrew from championship

- None

== Format ==
The draw for the Ulster championship was seeded, and took place in a staggered single elimination format. Antrim received a bye to the final, Down and Derry to the quarter-final and London to the second round. All six other teams entered in the first round.

For the first time, there was no entry from the Ulster Championship to the 2009 All-Ireland Senior Hurling Championship proper. Antrim instead entered that competition through the preliminary round of the Leinster Senior Hurling Championship. This marked the culmination of a process by which the winners of the Ulster championship had been held further and further back from the semi-final stage of the All-Ireland hurling championship. The Ulster championship continued as a stand-alone tournament.

The other Ulster teams were not eligible for the All-Ireland Senior Hurling Championship, and took part in lower tier competitions, such as the 2009 Christy Ring Cup, the second tier All-Ireland hurling championship.

The entry for 2009, ten, matched the 2008 record, and for many marked a second foray back into senior championship hurling. All nine historic counties of Ulster took part, in addition to London.

In order to avoid mismatches, and to allow Antrim to take part in the 2009 Leinster Senior Hurling Championship the draw was set so that the weaker counties were not faced with the prospect of facing regional powers Antrim at an early stage; instead all the other counties took part in a series of elimination matches for the right to meet Antrim in the final.

== Teams ==
| Antrim | Armagh | Derry | Down | Cavan |
Titles
| 48 | 0 | 4 | 4 | 0 |
Last title
| 2008 | n/a | 2001 | 1997 | n/a |
| Fermanagh | Tyrone | Monaghan | Donegal | London |
Titles
| 0 | 0 | 2 | 3 | 0 |
Last title
| n/a | n/a | 1915 | 1932 | n/a |

== Bracket ==
First Round
Armagh | 1-22 (25)
Monaghan | 1-8 (11)
Tyrone | 0-6 (06)
Donegal | 1-21 (24)
Fermanagh | 0-13 (13)
Cavan | 1-9 (12)

Second Round
Armagh | 3-24 (33)
Donegal | 2-12 (18)
London | 1-23 (26)
Fermanagh | 0-7 (7)

Quarterfinals
Armagh | 0-13 (13)
Down | 5-20 (35)
London | 3-12 (21)
Derry | 4-10 (22)

Semifinal
Derry | 1-18 (21)
Down | 2-17 (23)
2009 Ulster Senior Hurling Final
Antrim | 3-20 (29)
Down | 4-15 (27)

== Round 1 ==
| Date | Venue | Team | Score | Team | Score |
|---|---|---|---|---|---|
| May 9 | Enniskillen | Fermanagh | 0-13 | Cavan | 1-9 |
| May 9 | Letterkenny | Donegal | 1-21 | Tyrone | 0-6 |
| May 9 | Keady | Armagh | 1-22 | Monaghan | 1-8 |

== Round 2 ==
| Date | Venue | Team | Score | Team | Score |
|---|---|---|---|---|---|
| May 17 | Letterkenny | Donegal | 2-12 | Armagh | 3-24 |
| May 23 | Ruislip | London | 1-23 | Fermanagh | 0-7 |

== Quarter-finals ==
| Date | Venue | Team | Score | Team | Score |
|---|---|---|---|---|---|
| May 30 | Casement Park | Derry | 4-10 | London | 3-12 |
| May 30 | Casement Park | Down | 5-20 | Armagh | 0-13 |

== Semi-finals ==
| Date | Venue | Team | Score | Team | Score |
|---|---|---|---|---|---|
| June 14 | Casement Park | Derry | 1-18 | Down | 2-17 |

== Final ==
| Date | Venue | Team | Score | Team | Score |
|---|---|---|---|---|---|
| June 28 | Casement Park | Antrim | 3-20 | Down | 4-15 |

== See also ==
- 2010 All-Ireland Senior Hurling Championship
- 2010 Christy Ring Cup (Tier 2)
- 2010 Nicky Rackard Cup (Tier 3)
- 2010 Lory Meagher Cup (Tier 4)
