= 2011 Ulster Senior Hurling Championship =

- Dates: 17 June 2011 – 8 July 2011
- Teams: 8
- Champions: Antrim (51st title)

Tournament statistics
- Matches played: 7

The 2011 Ulster Senior Hurling Championship was the 66th installment of the annual Ulster Senior Hurling Championship held under the auspices of the Ulster GAA. Antrim were the defending champions and successfully claimed their tenth consecutive title, beating surprise finalists Armagh.

== Team changes ==
=== To championship ===
Entered championship

- None

=== From championship ===
Withdrew from championship

- Cavan
- London

== Format ==
The draw for the Ulster championship was seeded, and took place in a single elimination format. Antrim received a bye to the final, Monaghan to the semi-final. All six other teams entered in the first round.

There was no entry from the Ulster Championship to the 2011 All-Ireland Senior Hurling Championship proper. Antrim instead entered that competition through the preliminary round of the Leinster Senior Hurling Championship.

The other Ulster teams were not eligible, and took part in lower tier competitions, such as the 2011 Christy Ring Cup, the second tier All-Ireland hurling championship.

The number of teams in the championship for 2011, eight, was significantly in advance of historical numbers, but a slight drop from the ten of 2010 as London and Cavan left the competition; London had been angered by their treatment by the Ulster GAA in relation to a fixture clash, and Cavan had proved uncompetitive, even in the earliest rounds, culminating in a heavy defeat to Tyrone in 2010.

In order to avoid mismatches, the draw was set in set so that the weaker counties were not faced with the prospect of facing regional powers Antrim at an early stage; instead all the other counties took part in a series of elimination matches for the right to meet Antrim in the final.

== Teams ==
Antrim	Armagh	Derry	Down
Titles
50	0	4	4
Last title
2011	n/a	2001	1997
Fermanagh	Tyrone	Monaghan	Donegal
Titles
0	0	2	3
Last title
n/a	n/a	1915	1932

== Bracket ==
First round
Armagh	5-19
Fermanagh	5-06
Down	3-15
Donegal	1-13
Derry	2-13
Tyrone	0-06

Quarter-finals
Armagh	2-17
Monaghan	2-07
Down	3-19
Derry	1-09

Semi-finals
Armagh	0-14
Down	1-10

2011 Ulster SHC Final; Casement Park, Belfast
Armagh	2-12
Antrim	2-20
