= Dominic McKinley =

Irish hurler

Personal information
- Native name: Dominic Mac Fhionnlaoich (Irish)
- Born: 1960 (age 65–66) Loughguile, County Antrim, Northern Ireland
- Occupation: GPO Antrim
- Height: 6 ft 0 in (183 cm)

Sport
- Sport: Hurling
- Position: Centre-back
Club
- Years: Club
- Loughgiel Shamrocks
Club titles
- Antrim titles: 2
- Ulster titles: 2
- All-Ireland Titles: 1
Inter-county
- Years: County
- 1981-1994: Antrim
Inter-county titles
- Ulster titles: 5
- All-Irelands: 0
- NHL: 0
- All Stars: 0

Dominic McKinley (born 1960 in Loughguile, County Antrim) is an Irish former sportsperson. He played hurling with his local club Loughgiel Shamrocks and was a member of the Antrim county team in the 1980s and 1990s.

Sporting positions
Preceded by Kevin McNaughton	Derry Senior Hurling Manager; 2001–2004	Succeeded by Seán McCloskey
Preceded by Jim McKernan	Antrim Senior Hurling Manager (jointly with Terence McNaughton); 2006–2009	Succeeded by Dinny Cahill
Preceded by P. J. O'Mullan	Antrim Senior Hurling Manager (jointly with Terence McNaughton); 2016–	Succeeded by Incumbent
