= Manager (Gaelic games) =

Head coach of a Gaelic games team

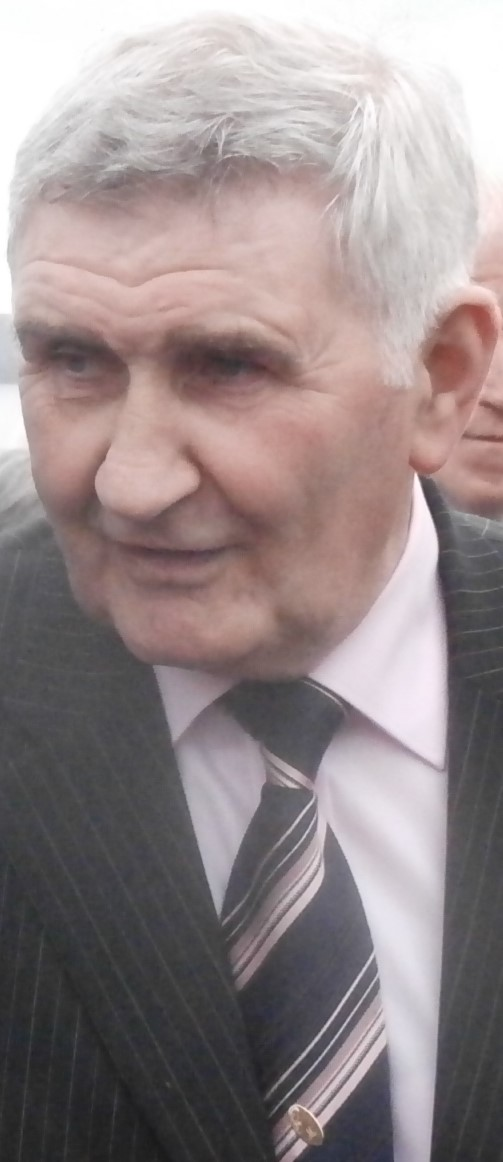
Mick O'Dwyer managed Kerry to 8 All-Ireland SFCs between 1975 and 1986.

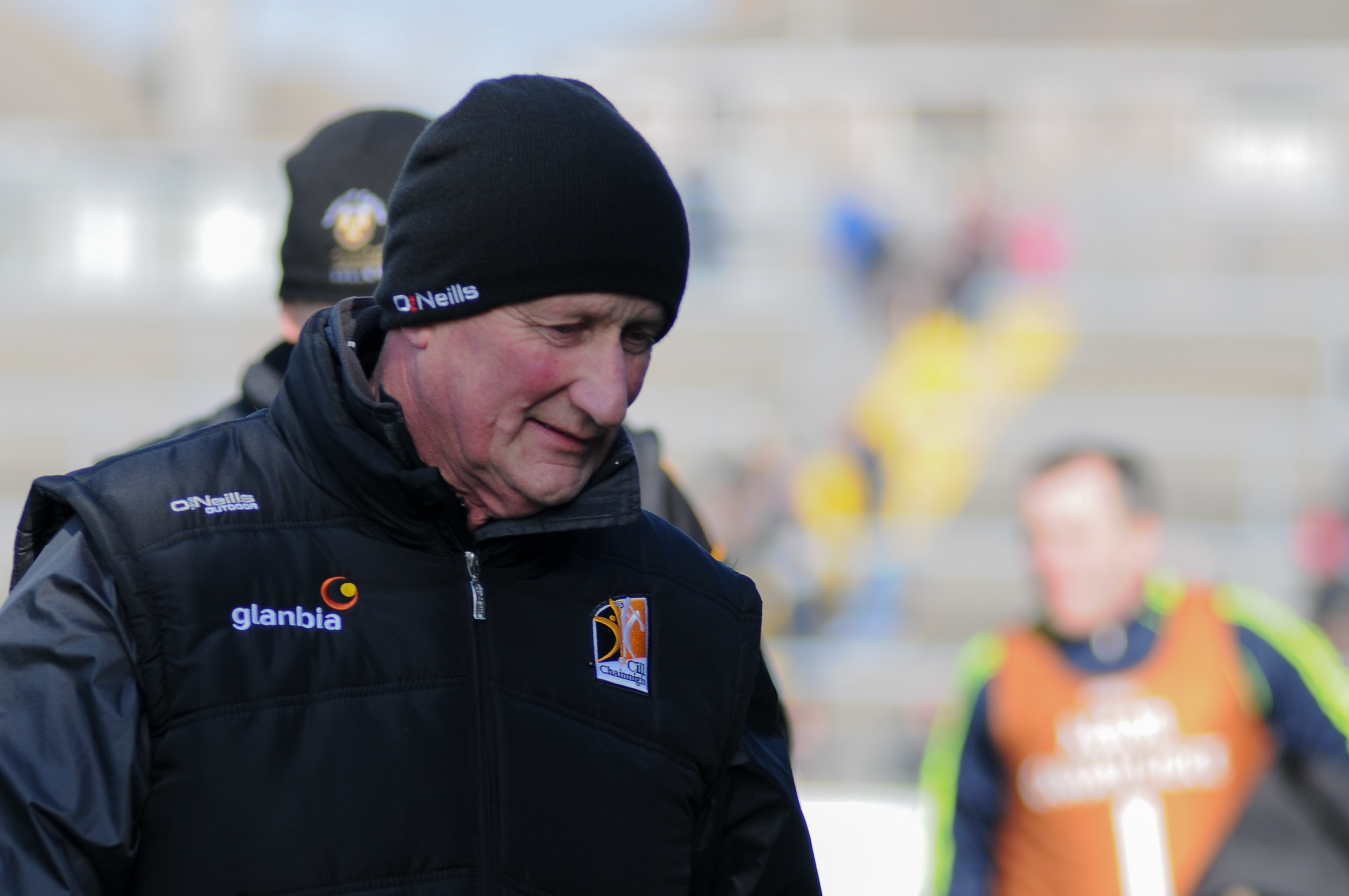
Brian Cody managed Kilkenny to 11 All-Ireland SHCs between 2000 and 2015.

In Gaelic games, a manager or (in Irish) bainisteoir is involved in the direction and instruction of the on-field operations of a team. The role entails the application of sport tactics and strategies during the game itself, and usually entails substitution of players and other such actions as needed. At games, the manager may sometimes wear a bib with the word "manager" or "bainisteoir" adorning it. Many managers were former players themselves, and are assisted in coaching the team by a group of selectors (in Irish roghnóirí).

== History ==
The term "manager" emerged in the 1970s owing to the influence of the BBC programme Match of the Day. A portion of the east coast of Ireland, including Dublin, was able to receive the channel and programme, which showed coverage of association football, where "manager" was the common term used for the coach or supervisor of the team. This later played a role in changing the management structure of Gaelic Athletic Association teams as the Dublin football revival of the 1970s evolved. Throughout the history of the GAA, clubs and teams and were often influenced by selection panels. By the early 1970s, the GAA began to take note of the merits of having an individual soccer-style manager accompanied by assistants. In 1973, the Dublin County Board appointed Kevin Heffernan to lead their football team. It was the first time in the GAA's history that a manager with substantial powers was appointed. Other counties later followed suit by having a single manager supported by a smaller selection panel. While the GAA's current management and coaching model was influenced by other sports (like soccer), several differences with those sports do remain.

During the 1970s and 1980s, a number of priests held the role of manager - though this is rare as of the 21st century.

== Appointment ==
The Gaelic Athletic Association publishes and maintains a set of guidelines for the appointment of managers. Managers of county teams can be appointed from within that county - though it is not uncommon for managers to be "brought in" from elsewhere.

As of 2016, GAA rules also allowed for a manager (in Irish bainisteoir) to be supported by a single assistant manager (in Irish maor foirne) during games. Under GAA rules, an assistant manager to a Gaelic football or hurling team could also be a member of the team's panel of selectors, but not be one of the team's panel of players. Changes to these rules, including the "effective eradication of the Maor Foirne role", were agreed following the 2021 GAA Congress.

== Notable managers ==
In inter-county football, Mick O'Dwyer managed 4 different inter-county teams, including leading Kerry to 8 All-Ireland Championship titles. Jim Gavin is the second-most successful inter-county manager, with 6 All-Ireland titles for Dublin - including a record-breaking 5 in a row between 2015 and 2019.

In inter-county hurling, the manager with the most championship wins is Kilkenny's Brian Cody, with 15 Provincial Championship and 11 All-Ireland Championship titles. Tommy Maher, also of Kilkenny, has the second-most All-Ireland hurling championship wins, with 7 titles.

== See also ==
- List of Gaelic football managers
- List of hurling managers
