= Ulster Senior Hurling Championship =

Ulster GAA Hurling Senior Championship
- Irish: Craobh Iomána Uladh
- Code: Hurling
- Founded: 1901; 125 years ago
- Abolished: 2018
- Region: Ulster (GAA)
- Trophy: Liam Harvey Cup
- No. of teams: 4
- Last Title holders: Antrim (57th title)
- Most titles: Antrim (57 titles)
- TV partner(s): RTÉ, BBC Northern Ireland
- Official website: Official website

The Ulster GAA Hurling Senior Championship, known simply as the Ulster Championship, was an annual inter-county hurling competition organised by the Ulster Council of the Gaelic Athletic Association (GAA). It was the highest inter-county hurling competition in the province of Ulster, and was contested every year between the 1901 championship and 1946, and between 1988 and the 2017 Championship. As of 2026 Ulster GAA have no plans to revive the competition due to calendar constraints and a lack of genuine contenders outside of Antrim and Down.

The final, usually held in July, served as the culmination of a series of games played during June, and the results determined which team received the Liam Harvey Cup. The championship was played on a straight knockout basis whereby once a team loses they are eliminated from the championship.

In 2016, a two-tier format began with four teams competing in the Ulster Senior Hurling Championship, and four in the Ulster Senior Hurling Shield.

The title has been won by five Ulster counties, all of which have won the title more than once. The all-time record-holders are Antrim who have won the competition 57 times. Antrim are also the title holders, defeating Armagh by 5–22 to 1–12 in the 2017 final.

== History ==
=== Standing of the Ulster Championship ===
While the Munster Hurling Championship and the Leinster Hurling Championship are generally held in very high regard, and have produced the vast majority of recent All-Ireland Hurling Champions, the Ulster Championship has not been regarded historically as of a similar standard, and the Ulster champions have entered the All-Ireland Hurling Championship at an earlier round than the Munster and Leinster champions.

This is due to a number of factors, one of which is the dominance of Gaelic football in eight of the nine counties of Ulster. An Ulster team has never won the All-Ireland Senior Hurling Championship, although Antrim were finalists in 1943 and 1989. Antrim have dominated the Ulster Championship throughout its existence, winning the title 57 times to date.

While below the standard of Leinster and Munster hurling, the Ulster championship has been generally more competitive than the now discontinued Connacht Senior Hurling Championship. However, Galway, by far the strongest team in Connacht, have historically performed much better than any Ulster team, with several All-Ireland titles, and generally recognised as one of the major powers in the sport.

=== Ulster Championship moments ===
The following are a list of upsets and moments in the Ulster Senior Hurling Championship:

- Down 2–16 – 0–11 Antrim (12 July 1992 at Casement Park) – An historic day for Down who claimed a first provincial title since 1941. Victory would have been more decisive but for a tally of 13 wides in the first half. While Antrim lacked an attacking ace, Down's Gerard McGrattan was their candidate for man of the match. Goalkeeper Noel Keith also brought off some remarkable saves, most notably from a Ciaran Barr shot in the first half.
- Derry 4–8 – 0–19 Antrim (9 July 2000 at Casement Park) – An historic day for Derry who secured the Ulster title for the first time in 92 years. Dual player Kieran McKeever got the opening goal for Derry, while Gary Biggs and Ollie Collins scored Derry's other two goals to give Derry an eight-point interval lead. A replay looked likely after John O'Dwyer's late goal levelled the scores minutes from time, however, it was Collins again scoring from a free to gain the winning point, and the title for Derry.
- Derry 1–17 – 3–10 Down (15 July 2001 at Casement Park) – A first for Derry as they retain the Ulster title for the only time in their history. It was the first final not to feature Antrim since 1934. A point from John O'Dwyer won the match for Derry. Despite dominating the play in the second half, Down only managed to score three points.
- Antrim 2–20 – 1–14 New York (22 October 2006 at Canton Field) – For the first and only time in the history of the championships, the Ulster final was played at Canton Field in Boston. This was to facilitate some of the New York teams who were unable to travel to Ireland due to their immigration status. A tally of 1–7 for Johnny McIntosh helped Antrim to a fifth successive championship.

== Format ==
=== Ulster Senior Hurling Championship ===
In the first tier, the Ulster Senior Hurling Championship, four teams compete in a knock-out format. The winners receive the Liam Harvey cup. The two teams beaten in the semi-finals of the Championship face each other in the relegation play-off with the losing team relegated to the following seasons Shield.

=== Ulster Senior Hurling Shield ===
In the second tier, the Ulster Senior Hurling Shield, four teams compete in a knock-out format, with the winner gaining promotion to the championship. Cavan do not participate.

=== Promotion/Relegation ===
The Shield winners are promoted to the championship and the loser of the championship relegation play-off are relegated.

=== All-Ireland Senior Hurling Championship ===
There is no longer a direct path for the Ulster Champions in the All-Ireland Senior Hurling Championship. The Ulster counties now compete in the Leinster Senior Hurling Championship, Joe McDonagh Cup, Christy Ring Cup, Nicky Rackard Cup and Lory Meagher Cup.

== Teams ==
=== 2017 Championship ===
The championship was suspended after the completion of the 2017 Ulster Senior Hurling Championship. Four counties were scheduled to compete in 2018:

County	Location	Stadium	Province	Position in 2017 Championship	First year in championship	In championship since	Championship Titles	Last Championship Title
Antrim	Belfast	Corrigan Park	Ulster	Champions	1900	1989	57	2017
Armagh	Armagh	Athletic Grounds	Ulster	Runners-up	1946	2007	0	—
Derry	Derry	Celtic Park	Ulster	Champions (Ulster Senior Hurling Shield)	1901	2018	4	2001
Down	Newry	Páirc Esler	Ulster	Semi-finals	1905	1989	4	1997

=== 2017 Shield ===
County	Location	Stadium	Province	Position in 2017 Championship	First year in shield	In shield since	Championship Titles	Last Championship Title
Donegal	Ballybofey	MacCumhaill Park	Ulster	Semi-finalists	2016	2018	3	1932
Fermanagh	Enniskillen	Brewster Park	Ulster	Semi-finalists (Ulster Senior Hurling Shield)	2016	2016	0	-
Monaghan	Clones	St Tiernach's Park	Ulster	Semi-finalists (Ulster Senior Hurling Shield)	2016	2016	2	1915
Tyrone	Omagh	Healy Park	Ulster	Runners-up (Ulster Senior Hurling Shield)	2016	2016	0	-

=== Debut of counties ===
Year	Debutants	Total
1900	Antrim	1
1901	Derry	1
1902	None	0
1903	Donegal	1
1904	None	0
1905	Down	1
1906-07	None	0
1908	Cavan, Fermanagh	2
1909	Monaghan	1
1910-45	None	0
1946	Armagh	1
1947-97	None	0
1998	London	1
1999	None	0
2000	New York	1
2001-07	None	0
2008	Tyrone	1
2009-	None	0
Total		11

=== List of Ulster Senior Hurling Championship counties ===
The following teams have competed in the Ulster Championship for at least one season.

Team	Total years	Debut	Championship titles	Last Championship title	Best Ulster result
Antrim		1900	57	2017	Champions
Armagh		1946	0	—	Runners-up
Cavan		1908	0	—	Runners-up
Derry		1901	4	2001	Champions
Donegal		1903	3	1932	Champions
Down		1905	4	1997	Champions
Fermanagh		1908	0	—	Semi-finals
London		1998	0	—	Semi-finals
Monaghan		1909	2	1915	Champions
New York		2000	0	—	Runners-up
Tyrone	4	2008	0	—	Second round

== List of Finals ==
=== List of finals ===
Year	Date	Winners		Runners-up		Winning margin	Venue	Winning captain	Referee
Year	Date	County	Score	County	Score	Winning margin	Venue	Winning captain	Referee
2018–present	No Championship								
2017	16 April	Antrim	5–22 (37)	Armagh	1–12 (15)	22	Owenbeg Centre Of Excellence		
2016	10 July	Antrim	6–21 (39)	Armagh	4–14 (26)	13	Owenbeg Centre of Excellence	Conor Carson	F. Horgan (Tipperary)
2015	12 July	Antrim	1–15 (18)	Down	1–14 (17)	1	Owenbeg Centre of Excellence	Chris O'Connell	
2014	13 July	Antrim	2–17 (23)	Derry	2–16 (22)	1	Owenbeg Centre of Excellence	Paul Shiels	
2013	2 February 2014	Antrim	4–20 (32)	Down	1–17 (20)	12	Celtic Park	Neil McManus	
2012	8 July	Antrim	3–18 (27)	Derry	0–09 (9)	18	Casement Park	Damien Quinn	
2011		Antrim	2–20 (26)	Armagh	2–12 (18)	8	Casement Park	Eddie McCloskey	
2010		Antrim	4–22 (34)	Down	1–12 (15)	19	Casement Park	Paul Shiels	
2009	28 June	Antrim	3–20 (29)	Down	4–15 (27)	2	Casement Park	Neil McGarry	
2008	15 June	Antrim	3–18 (27)	Down	2–16 (22)	5	Casement Park	Paddy Richmond	
2007	3 June	Antrim	2–24 (30)	Down	0–04 (4)	26	Casement Park	Seán Delaqrgy	
2006		Antrim	2–20 (26)	New York	1–14 (17)	9	Canton Park	Karl McKeegan	
2005		Antrim	2–22 (28)	Down	1–18 (21)	7	Casement Park	Jim Connolly	
2004	6 June, 13 June	Antrim	1–15 (18), 3–14 (23)	Down	1–15 (18), 0–18 (18)	5 (R)	Casement Park	Colm McGuickian	É. Morris (Dublin)
2003	14 June	Antrim	3–21 (30)	Derry	1–12 (15)	15	Casement Park	Colm McGuckian	B Kelly (Westmeath)
2002	9 June	Antrim	3–16 (25)	Down	1–18 (21)	4	Casement Park	Colm McGuckian	M. Wadding (Waterford)
2001	15 July	Derry	1–17 (20)	Down	3–10 (19)	1	Casement Park	Colin McEldowney	P. Aherne (Carlow)
2000	9 July	Derry	4–08 (20)	Antrim	0–19 (19)	1	Casement Park	Conor Murray	J. McDonnell (Tipperary)
1999	10 July	Antrim	2–19 (25)	Derry	1–09 (12)	13	Casement Park	Gary O'Kane	G. Devlin (Armagh)
1998	5 July	Antrim	1–19 (22)	Derry	2–13 (19)	3	Casement Park	Alistair Elliot	P. Delaney (Laois)
1997	6 July	Down	3–14 (23)	Antrim	0–19 (19)	4	Casement Park	Martin Mallon	P. Horan (Offaly)
1996	14 July	Antrim	1–20 (23)	Down	2–12 (18)	5	Casement Park		P Aherne (Carlow)
1995	9 July, 16 July	Down	3–07 (16), 1–19 (22)	Antrim	1–13 (16), 2–10 (16)	6 (R)	Casement Park		Aodán Mac Suibhne (Dublin)
1994	3 July	Antrim	1–19 (22)	Down	1–13 (16)	6	Casement Park	Dominic McKinley	P Horan (Offaly)
1993	4 July	Antrim	0–24 (24)	Down	0–11 (11)	13	Casement Park		Dickie Murphy (Wexford)
1992	12 July	Down	2–16 (22)	Antrim	0–11 (11)	11	Casement Park	Noel Sands	Dickie Murphy (Wexford)
1991	7 July	Antrim	3–14 (23)	Down	3–10 (19)	4	Casement Park		
1990	8 July	Antrim	4–11 (23)	Down	2–11 (17)	6	Casement Park		P Delaney (Laois)
1989	9 July	Antrim	2–16 (22)	Down	0–09 (9)	13	Athletic Grounds	Ciaran Barr	P Delaney (Laois)
1950–1988		No Championship							
1949		Antrim	Unopposed and awarded title						
1948		Antrim	Unopposed and awarded title						
1947		Antrim	Unopposed and awarded title						
1946		Antrim	6–03	Armagh	2–01		Corrigan Park		
1945		Antrim	8–02	Donegal	2–04		Corrigan Park		
1944		Antrim	5–07, 7–03	Monaghan	6–04, 0–01		Corrigan Park		
1943		Antrim	6–08	Down	2–00		Corrigan Park	Jimmy Walsh	
1942		Championship abandoned							
1941		Down	5–03	Antrim	2–05		Athletic Grounds		
1940		Antrim	4–04	Down	1–03				
1939		Antrim	9–08	Down	4–02		Páirc Esler		
1938		Antrim	3–05	Donegal	2–02				
1937		Antrim	6–07	Donegal	3–02				
1936		Antrim	2–10	Cavan	3–02				
1935		Antrim	7–09	Cavan	0–03				
1934		Antrim		Donegal					
1933		Antrim	1–07	Donegal	2–01				
1932		Donegal	5–04	Antrim	4–05				
1931		Antrim	4–10	Derry	0–01				
1930		Antrim	10–04	Down	2–00				
1929		Antrim	w/o	Donegal	scr.				
1928		Antrim	4–05	Cavan	1–01				
1927		Antrim	5–04	Cavan	3–03				
1926		Antrim	4–03	Cavan	3–01				
1925		Antrim	5–04	Donegal	4–05				
1924		Antrim	5–03	Donegal	4–00				
1923		Donegal	7–01	Antrim	3–00				
1917–1922		No Championship							
1916		Antrim	3–01	Monaghan	1–01				
1915		Monaghan	1–05	Antrim	1–02				
1914		Monaghan	2–00, 4–03	Antrim	2–00, 1–00				
1913		Antrim	3-03	Monaghan	0-00				
1912		Antrim represent ulster (no title awarded)							
1911		Antrim	w/o	Monaghan	scr.				
1910		Antrim		Donegal					
1909		Antrim	4-16	Monaghan	2-03				
1908		Derry	2–08	Cavan	0–02				
1907		Antrim	4–17	Derry	1–06				
1906		Donegal	5–21	Antrim	0–01				
1905		Antrim		Donegal					
1904		Antrim	2-04	Donegal	0-05				
1903		Antrim		Donegal					
1902		Derry	2–07	Antrim	2-05				
1901		Antrim	0–41	Derry	0–12				
1900		Antrim	Unopposed and awarded title						

- 1929 Antrim declared champions – Donegal disqualified
- 1901: Antrim defeated Derry 41 points to 12 points – exact score not given

== Roll of Honour ==
=== Performance by county ===
County	Titles	Runners-up	Years won	Years runner-up
Antrim	58	11	1900, 1901, 1903, 1904, 1905, 1907, 1909, 1910, 1911, 1913, 1916, 1924, 1925, 1926, 1927, 1928, 1929, 1930, 1931, 1933, 1934, 1935, 1936, 1937, 1938, 1939, 1940, 1943, 1944, 1945, 1946, 1947, 1948, 1949, 1989, 1990, 1991, 1993, 1994, 1996, 1998, 1999, 2002, 2003, 2004, 2005, 2006, 2007, 2008, 2009, 2010, 2011, 2012, 2013, 2014, 2015, 2016, 2017	1902, 1906, 1914, 1915, 1923, 1932, 1941, 1992, 1995, 1997, 2000
Down	4	20	1942, 1992, 1995, 1997	1930, 1939, 1940, 1943, 1989, 1990, 1991, 1993, 1994, 1996, 2001, 2002, 2004, 2005, 2007, 2008, 2009, 2010, 2013, 2015
Derry	4	8	1902, 1908, 2000, 2001	1901, 1907, 1931, 1998, 1999, 2003, 2012, 2014
Donegal	3	12	1906, 1923, 1932	1903, 1904, 1905, 1910, 1924, 1925, 1929, 1933, 1934, 1937, 1938, 1945
Monaghan	2	5	1914, 1915	1909, 1911, 1913, 1916, 1944
Cavan	0	6	—	1908, 1926, 1927, 1928, 1935, 1936
Armagh	0	4	—	1946, 2011, 2016, 2017
New York	0	1	—	2006

Antrim's historic domination (only 2 finals have not featured the county, 1908 and 2001) has led over time to periods of uncompetitive competitions, and the championship was not played at all between 1950 and 1988. However, there have been periods when this domination has made way for periods of intense rivalry, notably between Antrim and Monaghan in the 1910s, between Antrim and Down in the 1990s, and between Antrim and Derry in the early 2000s.

The 2001 Championship was unique in terms of being the only final since the reactivation of the Championship in 1988 which did not feature Antrim, as Derry defeated Down at Casement Park. Equally of note, Antrim have won every final since (albeit one on replay), their longest period of continuous success since 1988.

=== Performance by province ===
Province	Titles	Runners-up	Total
Ulster	71	66	137
North America	0	1	1

=== Ulster Senior Hurling Shield ===
County	Title(s)	Runners-up	Years won	Years runner-up
Donegal	1	0	2016	—
Derry	1	0	2017	—
Monaghan	0	1	—	2016
Tyrone	0	1	—	2017

== Team records and statistics ==
=== Team results ===
Legend

- 1st – Champions
- 2nd – Runners-up
- SF/QF – Semi-finals/Quarter-finals

For each year, the number of teams (in brackets) are shown.

Team	2000 (5)	2001 (5)	2002 (5)	2003 (5)	2004 (5)	2005 (5)	2006 (5)	2007 (5)	2008 (10)	2009 (10)	2010 (10)	2011 (8)	2012 (4)	2013 (4)	2014 (5)	2015 (5)	2016 (4)	2017 (4)	Years
Antrim	2nd	SF	1st	1st	1st	1st	1st	1st	1st	1st	1st	1st	1st	1st	1st	1st	1st	1st	18
Armagh	—	—	—	—	—	—	—	QF	QF	QF	QF	2nd	QF	QF	QF	QF	2nd	2nd	11
Cavan	—	—	—	—	—	—	—	—	R1	R1	R1	—	—	—	—	—	—	—	3
Derry	1st	1st	SF	2nd	SF	SF	SF	SF	SF	SF	QF	QF	2nd	SF	2nd	SF	SF	—	17
Donegal	—	—	—	—	—	—	—	—	R2	R2	R1	PR	—	—	QF	QF	—	SF	7
Down	SF	2nd	2nd	SF	2nd	2nd	SF	2nd	2nd	2nd	2nd	SF	SF	2nd	SF	2nd	SF	SF	18
Fermanagh	—	—	—	—	—	—	—	—	R1	R2	R1	PR	—	—	—	—	—	—	4
London	SF	SF	QF	QF	QF	QF	QF	SF	SF	QF	SF	—	—	—	—	—	—	—	11
Monaghan	—	—	—	—	—	—	—	—	QF	R1	R2	QF	—	—	—	—	—	—	4
New York	QF	QF	SF	SF	SF	SF	2nd	—	—	—	—	—	—	—	—	—	—	—	7
Tyrone	—	—	—	—	—	—	—	—	R2	R1	R2	PR	—	—	—	—	—	—	4

=== By Semi-Final Appearances (Since 2000) ===
Bold indicates years reached to final.

Team	No.	Years in Semi-finals
Antrim	18	**2000**, 2001, **2002**, **2003**, **2004**, **2005**, **2006**, **2007**, **2008**, **2009**, **2010**, **2011**, **2012**, **2013**, **2014**, **2015**, **2016**, **2017**
Down	18	2000, **2001**, **2002**, 2003, **2004**, **2005**, 2006, **2007**, **2008**, **2009**, **2010**, 2011, 2012, **2013**, 2014, **2015**, 2016, 2017
Derry	15	**2000**, **2001**, 2002, **2003**, 2004, 2005, 2006, 2007, 2008, 2009, **2012**, 2013, **2014**, 2015, 2016
New York	5	2002, 2003, 2004, 2005, **2006**
London	5	2000, 2001, 2007, 2008, 2010
Armagh	3	**2011**, **2016**, **2017**
Donegal	1	2017

=== By decade ===
The most successful team of each decade, judged by number of Ulster Senior Hurling Championship titles, is as follows:

- 1900s: 7 for Antrim (1900, 1901, 1903, 1904, 1905, 1907, 1909)
- 1910s: 4 for Antrim (1910, 1911, 1913, 1916)
- 1920s: 6 for Antrim (1924, 1925, 1926, 1927, 1928, 1929)
- 1930s: 9 for Antrim (1930, 1931, 1933, 1934, 1935, 1936, 1937, 1938, 1939)
- 1940s: 8 for Antrim (1940, 1943, 1944, 1945, 1946, 1947, 1948, 1949)
- 1980s: 1 for Antrim (1989)
- 1990s: 7 for Antrim (1990, 1991, 1993, 1994, 1996, 1998, 1999)
- 2000s: 8 for Antrim (2002, 2003, 2004, 2005, 2006, 2007, 2008, 2009)
- 2010s: 8 for Antrim (2010, 2011, 2012, 2013, 2014, 2015, 2016, 2017)

=== Finishing positions ===
- Most championships
  - 58, Antrim (1900, 1901, 1903, 1904, 1905, 1907, 1909, 1910, 1911, 1913, 1916, 1924, 1925, 1926, 1927, 1928, 1929, 1930, 1931, 1933, 1934, 1935, 1936, 1937, 1938, 1939, 1940, 1943, 1944, 1945, 1946, 1947, 1948, 1949, 1989, 1990, 1991, 1993, 1994, 1996, 1998, 1999, 2002, 2003, 2004, 2005, 2006, 2007, 2008, 2009, 2010, 2011, 2012, 2013, 2014, 2015, 2016, 2017)
- Most second-place finishes
  - 20, Down (1930, 1939, 1940, 1943, 1989, 1990, 1991, 1993, 1994, 1996, 2001, 2002, 2004, 2005, 2007, 2008, 2009, 2010, 2013, 2015)
- Most semi-final finishes (since 2000)
  - 10, Derry (2002, 2004, 2005, 2006, 2007, 2008, 2009, 2013, 2015, 2016)
- Most quarter-final finishes (since 2000)
  - 8, Armagh (2007, 2008, 2009, 2010, 2013, 2014, 2015, 2016)
- Most round 2 finishes
  - 2, Donegal (2008, 2009)
  - 2, Tyrone (2008, 2010)
- Most round 1 finishes
  - 3, Cavan (2008, 2009, 2010)
- Most preliminary round finishes
  - 1, Donegal (2011)
  - 1, Fermanagh (2011)
  - 1, Tyrone (2011)

=== Biggest wins ===
The most one sided Ulster finals:

- **35 points** – 1906: Donegal 5-21 - 0-01 Antrim
- **29 points** – 1901: Antrim 0-41 - 0-12 Derry
- **28 points** – 1930: Antrim 10-04 - 2-00 Down
- **27 points** – 1935: Antrim 7-09 - 0-03 Cavan
- **26 points** – 2007: Antrim 2-24 - 0-04 Down

=== Successful defending ===
3 teams of the 4 who have won the Ulster championship have ever successfully defended the title. These are:

- Antrim on 44 attempts out of 58 (1901, 1904, 1905, 1910, 1911, 1925, 1926, 1927, 1928, 1929, 1930, 1931, 1934, 1935, 1936, 1937, 1938, 1939, 1940, 1944, 1945, 1946, 1947, 1948, 1949, 1990, 1991, 1994, 1999, 2003, 2004, 2005, 2006, 2007, 2008, 2009, 2010, 2011, 2012, 2013, 2014, 2015, 2016, 2017)
- Derry on 1 attempts out of 4 (2001)
- Monaghan on 1 attempts out of 2 (1915)

=== Gaps ===
- Longest gaps between successive Ulster titles:
  - 92 years: Derry (1908–2000)
  - 50 years: Down (1942–1992)
  - 40 years: Antrim (1949–1989)
  - 17 years: Donegal (1906–1923)
- Longest gaps between successive Ulster finals:
  - 67 years: Derry (1931–1998)
  - 65 years: Armagh (1946–2011)
  - 46 years: Down (1943–1989)
  - 40 years: Antrim (1949–1989)
  - 28 years: Monaghan (1916–1944)
  - 23 years: Derry (1908–1931)
  - 18 years: Cavan (1908–1926)
  - 17 years: Donegal (1910–1923)

=== Active gaps ===
- Longest active gaps since an Ulster title:
  - 109 years: Monaghan (1915–)
  - 92 years: Donegal (1932–)
  - 27 years: Down (1997–)
  - 23 years: Derry (2001–)
  - 7 years: Antrim (2017–)
- Longest active gaps since an Ulster final appearance:
  - 88 years: Cavan (1936–)
  - 80 years: Monaghan (1944–)
  - 79 years: Donegal (1945–)
  - 18 years: New York (2006–)
  - 10 years: Derry (2014–)
  - 9 years: Down (2015–)
  - 7 years: Antrim (2017–)
  - 7 years: Armagh (2017–)

=== Longest undefeated run ===
- Antrim (28 games): The record for the longest unbeaten run stands at 28 games held by Antrim. It began with a 5–19 to 2–11 win against New York in the semi-final of the 2002 championship and is still ongoing.

== Player records ==
=== Winning Captains ===
Captains with 2 titles or more.

#	Player	County	No.	Winning years
1	Colm McGuckian	Antrim	3	2002, 2003, 2004
2	Paul Shiels	Antrim	2	2010, 2014

=== Winning Teams ===
Year	Winning county	Winning team
1945	Antrim	M McAllister; M Butler, W Feeney, B Donnelly; T McAllister, T Tierney, J Mullan; S McKeon, N Campbell; M Kelly, S Kelly, L McGrady; D Cormican, C Mullan, S Mulholland.
1946	Antrim	M McAlinden; W Feeney, M McDonald, M Butler; J Woods, J Mullan, J Loughead; D Butler, N Campbell; M Mulholland, D McRandall, J Murray; D Cormican, G Brady, S Mulholland.
1989	Antrim	N Patterson; G Rogan, T Donnelly, D Donnelly; J McNaughton, D McKinley, G O'Kane; P McKillen, T McNaughton; B Donnelly, A McCarry, J P McKillen; D Armstrong, C Barr, D McNaughton.
1990	Antrim	N Patterson; G Holden, D Donnelly, D McKinley; J Carson, D McKillop, A Murray; J Close, P McKillen; B Donnelly, A McCarry, S P McKillop; A McGuile, C Barr, O McFetridge. Subs: N Murray for A McGuile, G O'Kane for D McKillop, M Sullivan for McKillen.
1991	Antrim	N Patterson; P Jennings, D McKinley, D Donnelly; G Rogan, JMcNaughton, D McKillop; S P McKillop, P McKillen; J Carson, C Barr, D Armstrong; A McCarry, T McNaughton, J Close. Subs: Gregory O'Kane for Close, Garry O'Kane for S P McKillop, M Dennis for Greg O'Kane.
1992	Down	N Keith; K Coulter, D Woods, P Branniff; M Mallon, P McMullan, G Coulter; D Hughes, G Savage; P Coulter, G Blaney, G McGrattan; M Blaney, M Bailie, N Sands. Subs: C Mageean for M Blaney, P Savage for P Coulter.
1993	Antrim	P Gallagher; S McMullan, D McMullan, E McCloskey; R Donnelly, D McKinley, J McNaughton; P McKillen, P Jennings; A Elliott, Gary O'Kane, S P McKillop; J Close, T McNaughton, Greg O'Kane.
1994	Antrim	B Prenter; S McMullan, D McKinley, F McMullan; S P McKillen, P Jennings, J McCaffrey; P McKillen, J Connolly; J Carson, Gary O'Kane, P Walsh; C McCambridge, Gregory O'Kane, A Elliott. Subs: T McNaughton for G O'Kane, A McEteer for J McCaffrey, B McGary for G O'Kane.
1995	Down	N Keith; K Coulter, G Coulter, P Branniff; M Mallon, G Savage, D Woods; D Hughes, J McCarthy; P Coulter, P McMullan, M Blaney; C Arthurs, H Gilmore, N Sands. Subs: B Coulter for D Woods, M Branniff for P McMullan, S Mallon for H Gilmore.
1996	Antrim	B Prenter; E McCloskey, E Colgan, S McIlhatton; P Jennings, Gary O'Kane, R Donnelly; J Connolly, P McKillen; A McCloskey, T McNaughton, S P McKillop; P Graham, G O'Kane, A Elliott. Subs: S McMullan for R Donnelly, J Carson for McKillop, P Donnelly for McKillen.
1997	Down	G Clarke; B Milligan, S Murray, B Smith; M Branniff, M Mallon, T Coulter; G Savage, P Coulter; B Coulter, M Bailie, G McGrattan; M Coulter, J McCrickard, N Sands. Subs: B Branniff for J McCrickard.
1998	Antrim	S Elliott; R Donnelly, E Colgan, F McMullan; S McMullan, Gary O'Kane, C Kelly; P McKillen, J O'Neill; J Carson, C McGuckian, J McIntosh; A Elliot, Gregory O'Kane, L Richmond. Subs: K McKiernan for J O'Neill, J O'Neill for K McKiernan, J Elliott for J McIntosh.
1999	Antrim	S Elliot; C McCambridge, E McCluskey, R Donnelly; S McMullen, Gary O'Kane, S Mullen; C Cunning, J Close; A Elliot, C McGuckian, B McGarry; J Carson, Gregory O'Kane, L Richmond. Subs: S P McKillop for McGarry, F McMullin for Carson, J Flynn for A Elliott.
2000	Derry	K Stevenson; C McGurk, C Murray, N Mullan; B Ward, C McEldowney, D Cassidy; O Collins, M Conway; K McCloy, K McKeever, R McCloskey; G Biggs, M Collins, J O'Dwyer. Subs: Gregory Biggs for Conway.
2001	Derry	K Stevenson, C McEldowney, E McKeever, R Lynch, B Ward, M Conway, C Murray, R McCloskey, O Collins, Gary Biggs, K McKeever, Greg Briggs, M Collins, G McGonigle, J O'Dwyer. Subs: P Kelly for Lynch, S Downey for Gary Biggs, F McEldowney for M Collins.
2002	Antrim	D Quinn; M Kettle, K Kelly, E McCloskey; K McKeegan, R Donnelly, C Herron; C Cunning, C Connolly; L Watson, C McGuckian, L Richmond; A Delargy, G O'Kane, C McCambridge. Subs: B McFall for Delargy; M McCambridge for McCloskey; S Delargy for McFall; P Richmond for Cunning; C Hamill for Donnelly.
2003	Antrim	D Quinn; M Kettle, K Kelly, J Campbell; M McCambridge, K McKeegan, C Herron; C Cunning, J Connolly; P Richmond, C McGuckian, L Richmond; L Watson, G O'Kane, B McFall. Subs: A Delargy for O'Kane, P Close for McFall.
2004	Antrim	Damien Quinn, M Kettle, K Kelly, B Herron, M McCambridge, K McKeegan, J Campbell, C Herron, J Connolly, M Herron, C McGuckian, L Watson, Darren Quinn, P Richmond, B McFall. Subs: L Richmond for McCambridge, G J McIntosh for Watson, Ward for Darren Quinn, M Magill for Connolly.
2005	Antrim	D Quinn; M Kettle, G Bell, C Hamill; G Cunningham, J Campbell, M McCambridge; P Richmond, M Scullion; K McKeegan, K Kelly, M Herron, J McIntosh, J Connolly, J Scullion. Subs: K Stewart for Kelly, C Herron for M Herron, B McFall for J Scullion, C McGuckin for Cunningham.
2006	Antrim	D Quinn; B McCauley, J McKeague, J Campbell; M Molloy, K McKeegan, C Herron; C Cunning, M Scullion; J Scullion, C Kelly, M Herron; J McIntosh, P Richmond, B McFall. Subs: G Bell for McFall, B Delargey for Kelly, P McGill for McIntosh, M Dallas for M Scullion, S Óg McFadden for Richmond.
2007	Antrim	R McGarry; M Kettle, M McCambridge, S Delargy; M Molloy, J Campbell, C Herron; B Herron, K McKeegan, P McGill, N McManus, M Herron, S McCrory, J McIntosh, P Shiels. Subs: N McAuley; Brian McFall for Shiels; P Richmond for McGill; S McDonald for McIntosh; Barry McFall for Kettle.
2008	Antrim	R McGarry; A Graffin, N McGarry, S Delargy; C Herron, K McKeegan, J Campbell; K Stewart, E McCloskey; M Herron, C Donnelly, P McGill; P Richmond, L Watson, P Shields. Subs: PJ O’Connell for C Donnelly; S McCrory for P McGill; M Kettle for C Herron.
2009	Antrim	R McGarry; K McGourty, N McGarry, A Graffin; S Delargy, C Donnelly, N McAuley; J Campbell, K McKeegan; B Herron, N McManus, S McNaughton; K Stewart, P Richmond, J Scullion. Subs: E McCloskey for Stewart, M Herron for B Herron.
2010	Antrim	C O’Connell; K McGourty, C Donnelly, S Delargy; P Shiels, J Campbell, C Herron; S McNaughton, K Stewart; C McFall, T McCann, L Watson; PJ O’Connell, N McManus, K McKeegan. Subs: S McCrory for Stewart, J McKeague for Campbell, M Devlin for McNaughton, J McIntosh for Watson, B McFall for C McFall
2011	Antrim	C Cunningham; C McGuinness, K McGourty, J McCouaig; K McKeague, M Donnelly, C Herron; B McFall, S McCrory; J Scullion, T McCann, E McCloskey; P Doherty, C McFall, K McKeegan. Subs: K Molloy for K McKeague, C Carson for J Black, P Shiels for B McFall, D Hamill for T McCann.
2012	Antrim	D Quinn; James Campbell, N McGarry, A Graffin; M Herron, N McAuley, Johnny Campbell, B McAuley, S McNaughton; E McCloskey, C Carson, P Shiels; L Watson, N McManus, B McFall. Subs: C McCann for Sheils, J Scullion for Watson, C Rea for B McAuley, D Hamill for McFall, C McFall for Carson.
2013	Antrim	S McToal; B McFall, C McKinley, M Bradley; S McCrory, N McAuley, Ciaran Johnston; E Campbell, J McGreevy; N McKenna, C Carson, P Shiels; D McKernan, N McManus, C Clarke. Subs: S McAfee for McGreevy, Conor Johnston for McKernan, D Hamill for Clarke, N Elliott for McKenna.
2014	Antrim	S McToal; O McFadden, M Donnelly, A Graffin; M Bradley, C Carson, N McAuley; J McGreevy, D Hamill; C McCann, P Shiels, E Campbell; C McGuinness, PJ O'Connell, D McKernan. Subs: R McCambridge for McGreevy, Niall McKenna for McGuinness, Daniel McCloskey for Hamill.
2015	Antrim	C O’Connell; O McFadden, M Donnelly, R McCambridge; J Dillon, C McKinley, T McCann; N McAuley, M Dudley; PJ O’Connell, C McCann, E Campbell; D McClean, C Carson, D McKernan. Subs: P Burke for Campbell; C Ross for Donnelly; N McKenna for McAuley; J Connolly for McKernan; D Traynor for McClean.
2016	Antrim	C O'Connell; S McCrory, N McAuley, B Graham; F Donnelly, P Burke, J McKeague; E Campbell, D McKernan; E McCloskey, J Dillon, J Connolly; B McCarry, C Carson, C Clarke. Subs: O McFadden for McCrory, S Delargy for Graham, S McCrory for Donnelly, C McNaughton for McKernan.

== See also ==
- All-Ireland Senior Hurling Championship
  - Connacht Senior Hurling Championship
  - Leinster Senior Hurling Championship
  - Munster Senior Hurling Championship
