= 1901 Ulster Senior Hurling Championship =

- Date: 1 April 1901
- Teams: 2
- Champions: Antrim (2nd title)

Tournament statistics
- Matches played: 1

1901 Ulster Senior Hurling Final
Antrim	Derry
41	12
- Date: 1 April 1901
- Venue: Casement Park, Belfast

The 1901 Ulster Senior Hurling Championship was the inaugural edition of the annual Ulster Senior Hurling Championship held under the auspices of the Ulster GAA. The Championship consisted of a single match between Antrim and Derry, the only entrants.

Antrim had competed in the previous year's All-Ireland Senior Hurling Championship having emerged from Ulster unchallenged. As a consequence, Antrim were treated as defending Ulster Champions despite no matches taking place.

Antrim emerged victorious by 41 points to 12. The exact breakdown of the final score has been lost to history. Antrim advanced to the semifinal of the 1901 All-Ireland Senior Hurling Championship where they were defeated by Wexford.

== Teams ==
=== General Information ===
Two counties will compete in the Ulster Senior Hurling Championship:

County	Last Provincial Title	Last All-Ireland Title	Position in 1900 Championship	Appearance
Antrim	1900	—	All-Ireland semi-finals	2nd
Derry	—	—	—	1st

=== Team Kits ===
Antrim	Derry
Titles
1	0
Last title
1900	n/a

== Bracket ==
Finals
Antrim	41
Derry	12

== Final ==
=== Ulster final ===
Final

Antrim	41 – 12	Derry

- Antrim advance to the 1901 All-Ireland Senior Hurling Championship semi-finals.

== Miscellaneous ==
- Antrim win their 2nd Ulster title and remain the only team to win the championship.

== See also ==
- 1901 All-Ireland Senior Hurling Championship
