= Athletic Grounds (Armagh) =

Stadium in Armagh, Ireland

- Páirc Lúthchleasaíochta
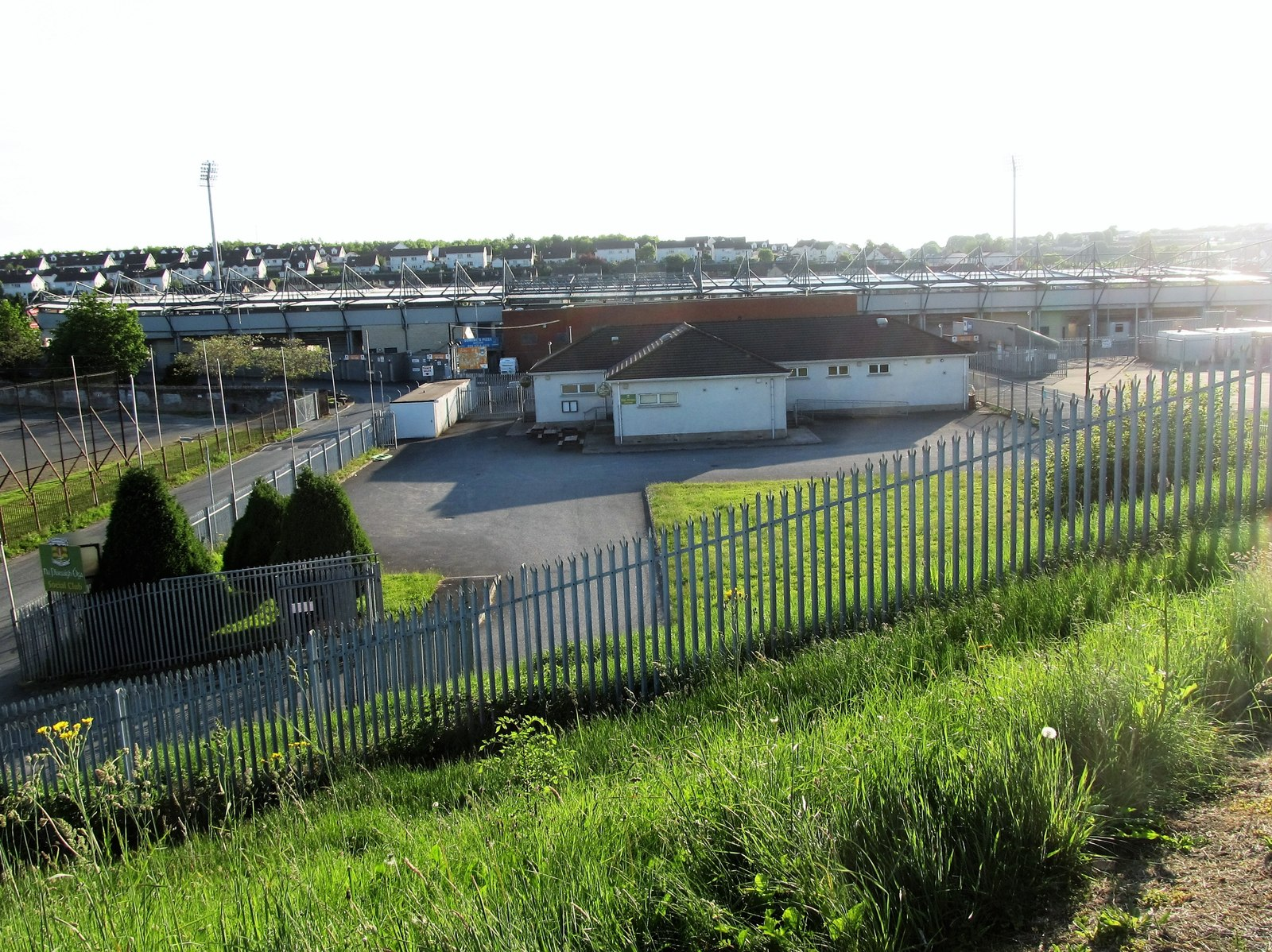

- Location within Northern Ireland
- Address: Dalton Road, Armagh, County Armagh
- Location: Northern Ireland
- Coordinates: 54°20′36.15″N 6°39′41.21″W
- Owner: Ulster Council
- Capacity: 18,500 (5,575 seated)
- Surface: Grass
- Field size: 143 x 88 m
- Public transit: Lonsdale Road bus stop

Construction
- Opened: 1920s
- Renovated: 2011

Tenant
- Armagh GAA (1920s-Present)

The Athletic Grounds (Irish: Páirc Lúthchleasaíochta), known for sponsorship reasons as the BOX-IT Athletic Grounds, is a GAA stadium in Armagh, Northern Ireland. It is the county ground and administrative headquarters of Armagh GAA and is used for both Gaelic football and hurling.

== Uses ==
The stadium is Armagh GAA's county ground, i.e., the primary stadium in the county. As such, it is used for higher-profile games such as county finals and inter-county matches in the national leagues and Ulster and All-Ireland Championships.

== Features ==
The ground has a capacity of 18,500, with one covered stand seating 5,575, one covered terraced stand, uncovered terracing at both ends of the grounds, floodlighting, changing rooms, administration facilities, a treatment suite, media room, referee's area, and access for disabled spectators. A new attendance record for the redeveloped ground was set on 14 June 2015 when 18,186 spectators attended the Ulster Senior Championship quarter-final between Armagh and Donegal.

== History ==
The grounds were purchased for the GAA for £1,000 by public subscription in 1936, when an area of land next to the Armagh-Keady railway line came on the market. The land had already been in use for sports for some years, and was informally known as "the Gaelic Field". However the term "Athletic Grounds" was in use from at least 1935 when the field hosted a sporting and cultural Feis featuring a football challenge match between Armagh and Dublin selections.

While remaining in trust for the County Board and serving as the county ground, the stadium was principally used for many years by Pearse Óg GAA Club in Armagh, which then had no ground of its own. In 1982 the ground was closed for a refurbishment costing £150,000. It was reopened in the GAA's centenary year, 1984, with a challenge match between the Armagh and Dublin county teams. The complex included a new Armagh GAA administrative headquarters (the Ceannáras), a handball alley and an extended and re-seeded playing area. The cost of refurbishing and maintaining the grounds proved unsustainable for the local club, resulting in the venue being handed back to the County Board and, in 2002, in its being closed again. Apart from a brief reopening in 2008 the Athletic Grounds remained out of use until the most recent redevelopment was completed in 2011.

== Redevelopment ==
In 2002, plans were announced by the GAA's Ulster Council to redevelop a number of stadiums, with the Athletic Grounds to receive £8 million to increase its capacity from 5,500 to 25,000. These plans were not, however, fully realised.

Instead, the reconstruction of the Athletic Grounds was taken forward in four phases by a development group that had been established by Armagh County Board in 1997, with funding garnered from a number of sources and eventually totalling £3.5 million. This included over £2m of National Lottery assistance, over £1m from GAA Ulster Council and Central Council, donations of £1,000 per year from each Armagh GAA club, and other grants from Armagh City and District Council.

By 2011 the redevelopment had been completed. The stadium was officially reopened on 5 February 2011 for an Allianz Football League match, which as in the 1984 reopening was between Armagh and Dublin.

Despite the success of fundraising efforts, the overall cost of the four phases, at £4.6m, left Armagh County Board with a deficit of more than £1m. It is seeking to clear the debt through a supporters' network, "My Armagh", by such means as seat sponsorship. In December 2010 it was announced that naming rights for the stadium would be sold to raise additional funds for the refurbishment project, and the rights eventually went to the Morgan Group, sponsor of Armagh GAA county teams since 1997. The stadium was known from May 2011 as the Morgan Athletic Grounds (Páirc Lúthchleasaíochta Uí Mhuiregáin), but reverted to the original name following the withdrawal of Morgan sponsorship, announced in November 2012.

== Transport ==
The stadium (part of which stands on the site of Irish Street Halt on the old Armagh-Keady railway line) is only accessible by road since the railway line through Armagh closed in 1957. It is close to the main Armagh to Monaghan road.

== See also ==
- List of Gaelic Athletic Association stadiums
- List of stadiums in Ireland by capacity
