= McGurk =

McGurk is a surname of Scottish and Irish origin. Notable people with this surname include:

== People ==
- Adam McGurk (born 1989), Northern Irish footballer
- Anna McGurk (1968–1991), English council worker who was raped and murdered
- Anthony McGurk, Northern Irish Gaelic footballer
- Brett McGurk (born 1973), American diplomat
- Brian McGurk (died after 1712), Irish priest during the Penal Times
- Caitlin McGurk (born 1986), American museum curator and author
- Chris McGurk (born 1957), American producer
- Colm McGurk (1967–2022), Northern Irish hurler and footballer
- David McGurk (born 1982), English footballer
- Edward A. McGurk (1841–1896), American Catholic priest and university president
- Francis McGurk (1909–1978), Scottish footballer
- Gordon McGurk (born 1965), Scottish lawyer and cricketer
- Harry McGurk (1936–1998), Scottish cognitive psychologist known for the discovery of the McGurk effect
- Hugh Martin McGurk, former Gaelic footballer; brother of Anthony McGurk
- Jake Fraser-McGurk (born 2002), Australian cricketer
- John McGurk (1874–1944), British coal miner and trade unionist
- Johnny McGurk (born 1965), retired Gaelic footballer; brother of Anthony and Hugh
- Kobie McGurk (born 1985), Australian field hockey player
- Matthew McGurk (born 1980), American talent manager and music producer
- Michael McGurk (died 1948), Northern Ireland politician
- Michael Loch McGurk (1958–2009), Australian businessman and murder victim
- Mike McGurk (born 1968), British Anglican priest
- Sean McGurk (born 2003), English professional footballer
- Simone McGurk (born 1963), Australian politician
- Tom McGurk (born 1946), Irish poet

== Disambiguation pages ==
- Frank McGurk (disambiguation)

== Fictional characters ==
- McGurk, a villain in the Bob Hope/Bing Crosby film Road to Utopia
- McGurk, a dog (played by an actor) in the television series pilot McGurk: A Dog's Life
- Jack McGurk, nine-year-old hero of a series of books by Edmund Wallace Hildick called "McGurk Mystery"
- Nick "The Slasher" McGurk, the cover identity assumed by Lt. Frank Drebin in Naked Gun 33 1/3
- Roy McGurk, a corrupt, one-eyed British soldier in the radio comedy Revolting People
- Slag McGurk, hero of the 1947 film The Mighty McGurk, played by Wallace Beery
- Stroker McGurk, comic character

== Places ==
- McGurk Cabin in Yosemite National Park, California, U.S.
- McGurk Meadow in Yosemite National Park, California
- McGurk's Suicide Hall, saloon and dance hall in Manhattan, New York City, New York, U.S.

== See also ==
- Carrickmore in the Parish of Termonmaguirc (McGurk), County Tyrone, Northern Ireland
- Conor McGurk Cup, annual Northern Irish hurling competition
- McGurk Effect, where a sound is misheard because of a misleading visual cue
