= Colm McGurk =

Dual player of Gaelic games for Lavey and Derry (1966–2022)

Personal information
- Native name: Colm Mac Oirc (Irish)
- Nickname: Collie
- Born: 1966 Lavey, Northern Ireland
- Died: 12 July 2022 (aged 55) Magherafelt, Northern Ireland
- Occupation: Architect
- Height: 5 ft 10 in (178 cm)

Sport
- Football Position: Right wing-back
- Hurling Position: Right wing-back
Club
- Years: Club
- Lavey
Club titles
	Football	Hurling
Derry titles	4	13
Ulster titles	2	0
All-Ireland titles	1	0
College
- Years: College
- 1985–1991: Queen's University Belfast
College titles
- Sigerson titles: 1
- Fitzgibbon titles: 0
Inter-county
- Years: County
- 1987–2000 1990–1996: Derry (SH); Derry (SF)
Inter-county titles
	Football	Hurling
Ulster Titles	1	1
All-Ireland Titles	1	1 (B)
League titles	3	0

Colm McGurk (Irish: Colm Mac Oirc; 1967 – 12 July 2022) was a dual player of Gaelic games, i.e. hurling and Gaelic football, who played both sports for the Lavey club, as well as for both Derry senior teams. McGurk also served as a coach and manager at various levels.

== Playing career ==
One of 13 children, McGurk first played Gaelic football and hurling at juvenile and underage levels with Lavey. He won consecutive MacRory Cup titles lining out as a schoolboy with St Patrick's College, Maghera before winning a Sigerson Cup title as a student at Queen's University Belfast. McGurk progressed onto the Lavey senior teams in both codes and was corner-forward on the team that won the All-Ireland SCFC title in 1991. His lengthy club career also yielded 16 titles at county level across both codes. At inter-county level, McGurk followed his brothers, Hugh Martin, Anthony and Johnny, onto the Derry team and won Ulster U21 titles in both codes in 1986 before spending much of his senior career as a dual player. He was a member of the extended panel when Derry beat Cork in the 1993 All-Ireland SFC final. His other inter-county honours include three National Football League titles and Ulster Championship titles in both codes.

== Management career ==
In retirement from playing, McGurk filled a number of coaching and management roles at club and inter-county levels. He was manager of the Derry senior hurling team for two years and guided them to the 2017 Nicky Rackard Cup title.

== Death ==
McGurk died on 12 July 2022, aged 55.

== Honours ==
=== Player ===
St Patrick's College

- MacRory Cup: 1984, 1985

Queen's University Belfast

- Sigerson Cup: 1990

Lavey

- All-Ireland Senior Club Football Championship: 1991
- Ulster Senior Club Football Championship: 1990, 1992
- Derry Senior Football Championship: 1988, 1990, 1992, 1993
- Derry Senior Hurling Championship: 1985, 1986, 1988, 1990, 1991, 1992, 1994, 1995, 1997, 1999, 2001, 2002

Derry

- All-Ireland Senior Football Championship: 1993
- Ulster Senior Football Championship: 1993
- Ulster Senior Hurling Championship: 2000
- National Hurling League Division 2: 2000
- National Football League Division 1: 1991–92, 1994–95, 1995–96
- Ulster Under-21 Football Championship: 1986
- Ulster Under-21 Hurling Championship: 1986

=== Manager ===
Derry

- Nicky Rackard Cup: 2017
- Ulster Under-21 Hurling Championship: 2017

Sporting positions
Preceded by Tom McLean	Derry senior hurling team manager 2016–2018	Succeeded by John McEvoy
