= McGurl =

McGurl is a surname. Notable people with the surname include:

- Daniel M. McGurl (1896–1976), United States Navy admiral
- Eugene Francis McGurl (1917–1942), United States Army Air Force officer
- Mark McGurl, American literary critic

== See also ==
- McGurk
