= Hugh Martin (disambiguation) =

Hugh Martin (1914–2011) was an American musical theater and film composer, arranger, vocal coach, and playwright.

Hugh Martin may also refer to:

- Hugh Martin (minister, born 1822) (1822–1885), Scottish minister of the Free Church of Scotland
- Hugh Martin (minister, born 1890) (1890–1964), British Christian student leader, active in the ecumenical movement, and a publisher
- Hugh Martin (cricketer) (born 1947), South African cricketer
- Hugh Martin (rugby union) (1880–1970), Scottish rugby union player

== See also ==
- Hugh M. Morris or Hugh Martin Morris (1878–1966), United States district judge
- Hugh Murray (rugby union) or Hugh Martin Murray (1912–2003), Scottish international rugby union player
- Hugh Martin McGurk, former dual player from Northern Ireland
