= USS Biloxi =

Light cruiser of the United States Navy

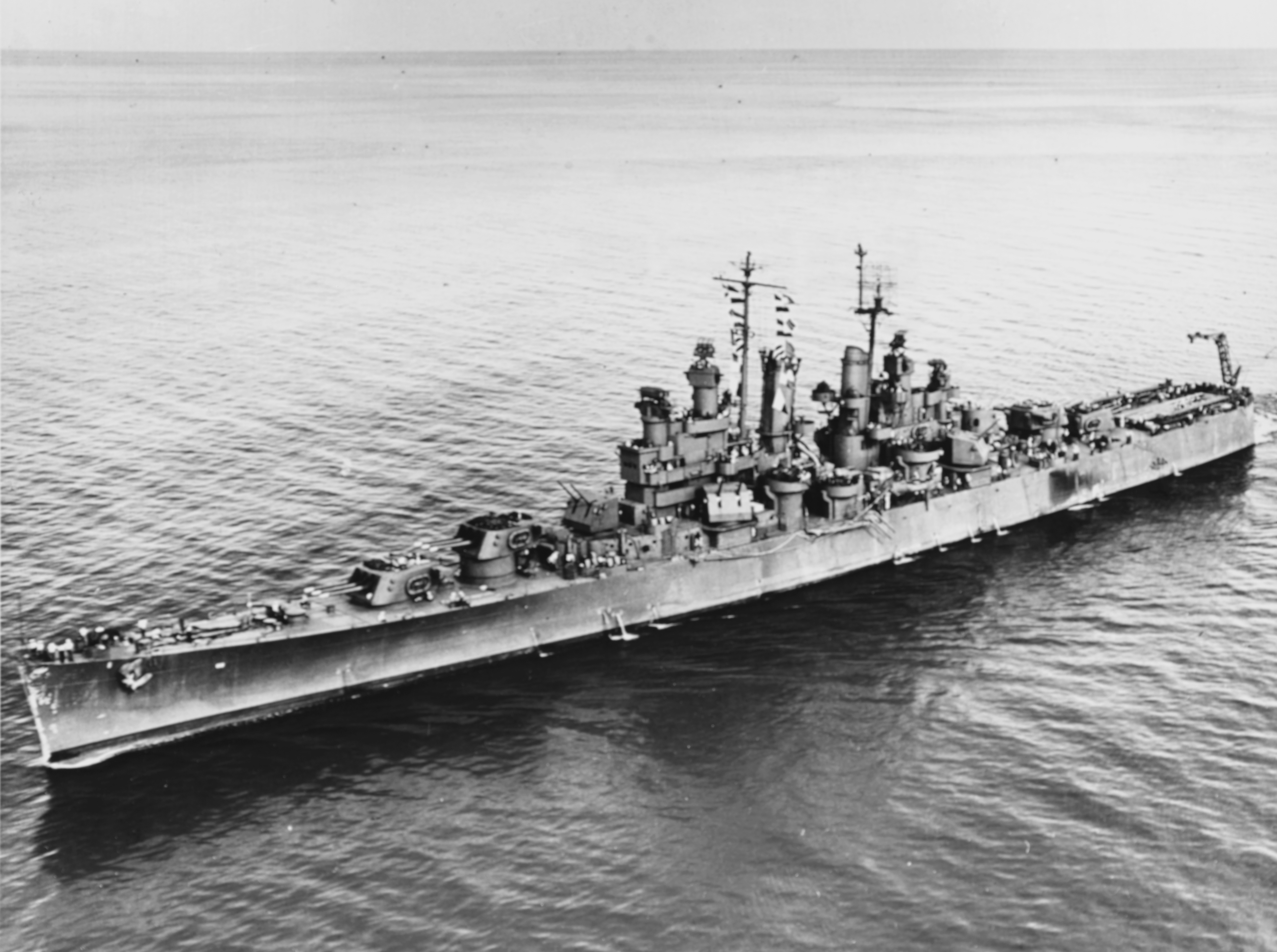
- USS Biloxi in 1943

History

United States
- Name: Biloxi
- Namesake: City of Biloxi, Mississippi
- Builder: Newport News Shipbuilding & Dry Dock Company, Newport News, Virginia
- Laid down: 9 July 1941
- Launched: 23 February 1943
- Commissioned: 31 August 1943
- Decommissioned: 29 August 1946
- Stricken: 1 December 1961
- Fate: Sold for scrap on 5 March 1962

General characteristics
- Class & type: Cleveland-class light cruiser
- Displacement: Standard: 11,744 long tons (11,932 t); Full load: 14,131 long tons (14,358 t)
- Length: 610 ft 1 in (185.95 m)
- Beam: 66 ft 4 in (20.22 m)
- Draft: 24 ft 6 in (7.47 m)
- Installed power: 4 × Babcock & Wilcox boilers; 100,000 shp (75,000 kW)
- Propulsion: 4 × steam turbines; 4 × screw propellers
- Speed: 32.5 knots (60.2 km/h; 37.4 mph)
- Range: 11,000 nmi (20,000 km; 13,000 mi) at 15 kn (28 km/h; 17 mph)
- Complement: 1,285 officers and enlisted
- Armament: 12 × 6 in (152 mm) Mark 16 guns; 12 × 5 in (127 mm)/38 caliber guns; 24 × 40 mm (1.6 in) Bofors anti-aircraft guns; 21 × 20 mm (0.79 in) Oerlikon anti-aircraft guns
- Armor: Belt: 3.5–5 in (89–127 mm); Deck: 2 in (51 mm); Barbettes: 6 in (152 mm); Turrets: 6 in (152 mm); Conning Tower: 5 in (127 mm)
- Aircraft carried: 4 × floatplanes
- Aviation facilities: 2 × stern catapults

USS Biloxi was a Cleveland-class light cruiser of the United States Navy, which were built during World War II. The class was designed as a development of the earlier Brooklyn-class cruisers, the size of which had been limited by the First London Naval Treaty. The start of the war led to the dissolution of the treaty system, but the dramatic need for new vessels precluded a new design, so the Clevelands used the same hull as their predecessors, but were significantly heavier. The Clevelands carried a main battery of twelve 6-inch (152 mm) guns in four three-gun turrets, along with a secondary armament of twelve 5 in (127 mm) dual-purpose guns. They had a top speed of 32.5 knots (60.2 km/h; 37.4 mph).

The ship was laid down on 9 July 1941 at Newport News, Virginia, by the Newport News Shipbuilding & Dry Dock Co. and launched on 23 February 1943, sponsored by Mrs. Katharine G. Braun, wife of the Mayor of Biloxi. She was commissioned at the Norfolk Navy Yard on 31 August 1943, with Captain Daniel M. McGurl in command.

== Design ==
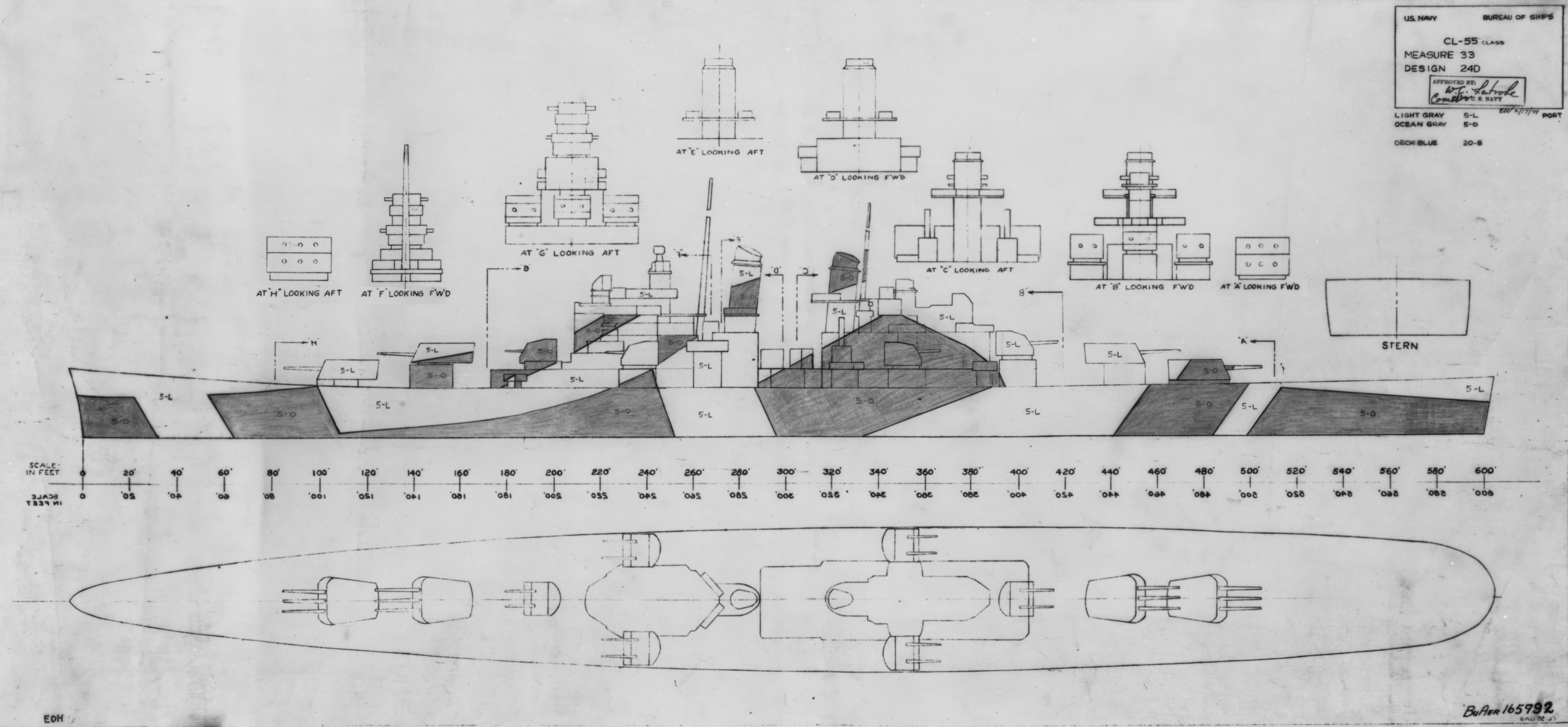
Depiction of the Cleveland class, showing the plan and profile

The Cleveland-class light cruisers traced their origin to design work done in the late 1930s; at the time, light cruiser displacement was limited to 8,000 long tons (8,100 t) by the Second London Naval Treaty. Following the start of World War II in September 1939, Britain announced it would suspend the treaty for the duration of the conflict, a decision the US Navy quickly followed. Though still neutral, the United States recognized that war was likely and the urgent need for additional ships ruled out an entirely new design, so the Clevelands were a close development of the earlier Brooklyn-class cruisers, the chief difference being the substitution of a two-gun 5 in (127 mm) dual-purpose gun mount for one of the main battery 6 in (152 mm) gun turrets.

Biloxi was 610 feet 1 inch (186 m) long overall and had a beam of 66 ft 4 in (20.22 m) and a draft of 24 ft 6 in (7.47 m). Her standard displacement amounted to 11,744 long tons (11,932 t) and increased to 14,131 long tons (14,358 t) at full load. The ship was powered by four General Electric steam turbines, each driving one propeller shaft, using steam provided by four oil-fired Babcock & Wilcox boilers. Rated at 100,000 shaft horsepower (75,000 kW), the turbines were intended to give a top speed of 32.5 knots (60.2 km/h; 37.4 mph). Her crew numbered 1285 officers and enlisted men. The ship was fitted with a pair of aircraft catapults and an initial complement of four Curtiss SO3C seaplanes.

The ship was armed with a main battery of twelve 6 in /47-caliber Mark 16 guns (Note: /47 refers to the length of the gun in terms of calibers. A /47 gun is 47 times long as it is in bore diameter.) in four 3-gun turrets on the centerline. Two were placed forward in a superfiring pair; the other two turrets were placed aft of the superstructure in another superfiring pair. The secondary battery consisted of twelve 5 in (127 mm) /38-caliber dual-purpose guns mounted in twin turrets. Two of these were placed on the centerline, one directly behind the forward main turrets and the other just forward of the aft turrets. Two more were placed abreast of the conning tower and the other pair on either side of the aft superstructure. Anti-aircraft defense consisted of twenty-four Bofors 40 mm (1.6 in) guns in four quadruple and four double mounts and twenty-one Oerlikon 20 mm (0.79 in) guns in single mounts.

The ship's belt armor ranged in thickness from 3.5 to 5 in (89 to 127 mm), with the thicker section amidships where it protected the ammunition magazines and propulsion machinery spaces. Her deck armor was 2 in (51 mm) thick. The main battery turrets were protected with 6.5 in (170 mm) faces and 3 in (76 mm) sides and tops, and they were supported by barbettes 6 inches thick. Biloxi's conning tower had 5-inch sides.

== Service history ==
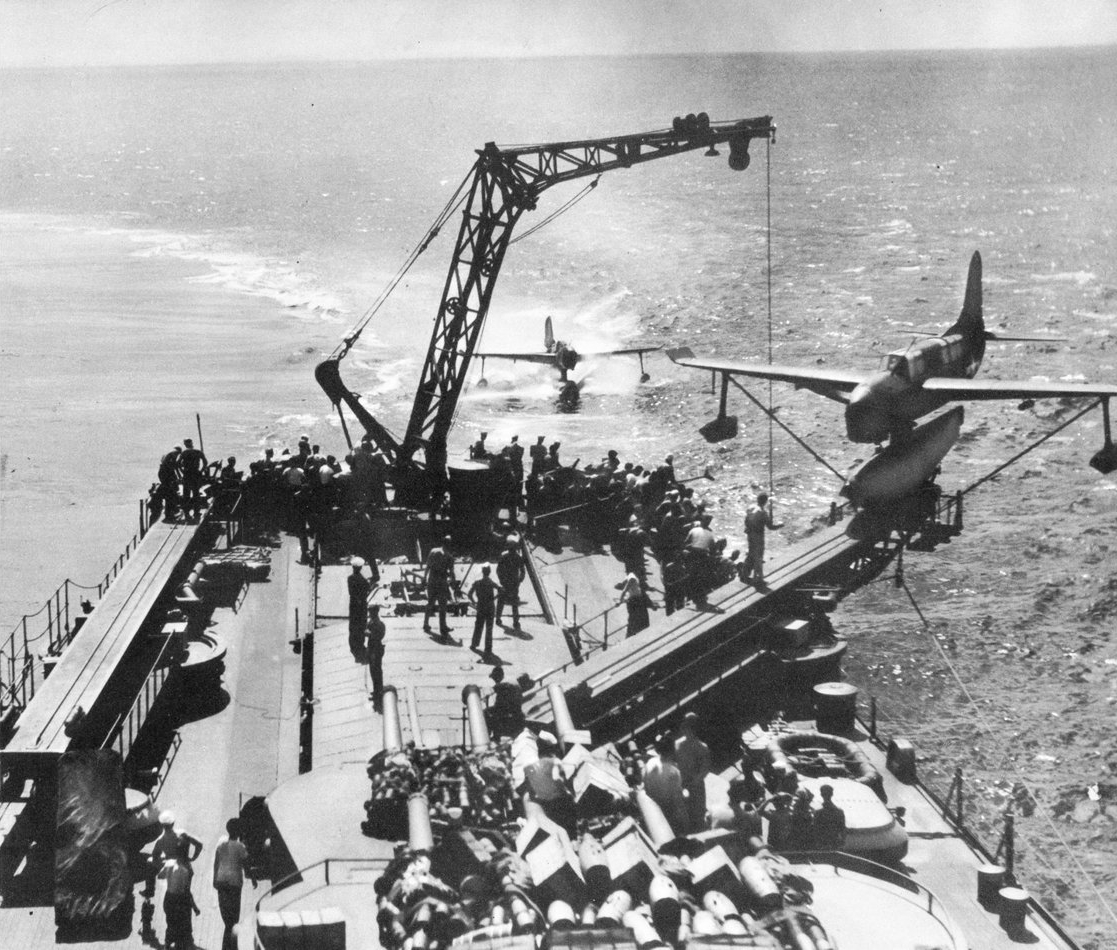
One of Biloxi's SO3Cs landing astern of the ship, while another sits on the port catapult

The keel for Biloxi was laid down on 9 July 1941 at the Newport News Shipbuilding & Dry Dock Co. shipyard in Newport News, Virginia. She was launched on 23 February 1943, by which time the United States had entered World War II. Fitting-out was completed quickly, and the ship was commissioned on 31 August. Her first commanding officer was Captain Daniel M. McGurl. Final fitting out continued until 17 September, when she departed for a shakedown cruise to evaluate the vessel. The trip was restricted to Chesapeake Bay, but it included training for launching and recovering her seaplanes, shooting tests to evaluate the structural strength of the main battery guns, and anti-aircraft shooting practice. Biloxi then departed for a longer training cruise on 29 September, in company with the destroyer Sproston. The ships steamed to Trinidad in the Caribbean Sea, and while en route, one of the cruiser's seaplanes crashed while trying to land, though both crewmen were rescued. The ships then sank the still-floating wreck to avoid causing a navigation hazard.

The two ships reached Trinidad on 3 October, and Biloxi began a series of intensive combat training exercises that lasted for two weeks. These covered a range of activities the crew needed to master before they were sent to war, including day and night fighting, refueling at sea, and directing combat air patrol fighters to intercept enemy aircraft. The ship's radars also needed to be calibrated properly. On 18 October, Biloxi sailed north to the Norfolk Navy Yard for maintenance and repairs. She then made a brief visit to Rockland, Maine, where tests to confirm the calibration of her compasses and gyroscopes were carried out. On 20 November, she departed the East Coast of the United States for the Panama Canal. Four days later, she passed through the canal and turned north for San Francisco, arriving on 4 December. The crew made preparations for deployment west, including loading supplies and transferring the SO3C seaplanes ashore and loading a pair of Vought OS2U Kingfishers in their place. On 7 December, she departed for Pearl Harbor, Hawaii.

Biloxi arrived at Pearl Harbor on 11 December. Beginning on the 15th, she engaged in shore bombardment practice with the heavy cruiser Wichita on Kahoʻolawe Island; these exercises continued until 19 December. Biloxi then departed for San Francisco the following day. After arriving on 24 December, she moved to San Pedro for repairs. During this period, she was assigned to 5th Fleet. Work on the ship was completed by the end of the year, and on 1 January 1944, she joined a bombardment unit tha included the battleship Maryland, the cruisers Louisville and Mobile, and two destroyers for more shooting practice at San Clemente Island. She thereafter returned to San Pedro to replenish supplies and fuel.

=== Pacific War operations ===
==== Marshall Islands, January–February 1944 ====
Biloxi put to sea on 13 January and, after joining Task Group (TG) 53.5 in Hawaii, sailed for the Marshall Islands. In company with Louisville, Mobile, Santa Fe, and six destroyers, the light cruiser approached Wotje early in the morning on 30 January. After launching her Kingfisher spotter aircraft, she carried out a neutralizing bombardment of the Japanese air base on Wotje from dawn until noon. Enemy shore batteries fired back intermittently, one of which straddled Biloxi. A later ricochet hit the superstructure above the signal bridge but fortunately did not explode.

Over the next two days, the light cruiser participated in several more shore bombardment missions against Roi Island in support of amphibious landings made by the Northern Attack Force. She then screened three escort carriers for five days before entering Majuro lagoon on the 7th to refuel.

On 12 January, Biloxi joined TG 58.1, built around the carriers Enterprise, Yorktown, and Belleau Wood, and sailed west for a carrier raid against the Japanese base at Truk Lagoon in the central Pacific. Intended to cover the landings on Eniwetok and to distract the Japanese from Allied operations in New Guinea, "Operation Hailstone" began on 16 February when the carriers struck enemy airfields on Truk. After a second strike during the morning of the 17th, the task group retired east to refuel. Following the departure of Enterprise later that day, the remaining warships were shifted into TG 58.2 and steamed northwest for a strike against Saipan.

==== Marianas, February –June 1944 ====
On 19 February, a Japanese reconnaissance aircraft closed the task group and was shot down by anti-aircraft fire. During this action, a salvo of anti-aircraft shells landed 500 yards off Biloxi's starboard bow. Although the task group hoped they had avoided enemy detection, it was clear by the evening of the 21st that the Japanese were tracking them. Starting at 23:00 that evening, and continuing until 10:00 the following morning, the task group was attacked by three waves of Mitsubishi G4M "Betty" land-attack bombers. A total of nineteen bombers attacked at night and another five closed the task group in the morning. None penetrated the surface ship screen and eleven were shot down by anti-aircraft fire. Following air strikes against Saipan, the task group returned to Majuro on the 26th.

Biloxi rearmed and replenished and got underway on 7 March in company with Enterprise, Belleau Wood, two other light cruisers and eight destroyers. Heading south, the task group crossed the equator, at which time Neptune ceremonies were held and Biloxi made loyal shellbacks out of some 1,139 polywogs, and arrived at Espiritu Santo on the 11th. There, the warships loaded supplies and provisions before proceeding to Emirau in the Bismarck Archipelago. The light cruiser then covered the Marine landings on the 20th and again on the 25th.

Returning north the next day, the task group was joined by Cowpens, a fourth light cruiser, and nine more destroyers before conducting a raid against Japanese forces in the western Carolines. On 30 March, Biloxi covered the carriers during strikes on Palau. One "Betty" was shot down as it tried to close the formation that morning. Later that night, gun crews spotted a single Aichi D3A "Val" carrier bomber flying overhead and fired several 5 inch batteries in a vain attempt to shoot it down. After observing the destruction of three Japanese patrol craft by two destroyers off Woleai the next day, the light cruiser steamed back to Majuro, arriving there on 6 April.

Following a week of upkeep, Biloxi sortied on 13 April with TG 58.1 for the Hollandia operation. On 21 April, she covered the carriers as they launched strikes against enemy aircraft and installations at Sawar, Wakde, and Sarmi in New Guinea. At 14:56 that afternoon, the light cruiser launched two Kingfishers to rescue the crew of a ditched Grumman TBF Avenger. Neither floatplane found the aircraft crew, however, and one of the floatplanes later ran out of fuel. Lt.(jg) H. Jolly landed the aircraft on the water and the crew was rescued by Frazier.

That evening, Biloxi, two other light cruisers and five destroyers closed Wakde and Sawar. Fire was opened at 01:15 on the 22nd against aircraft on Wakde and ceased at 02:25 after firing at the airfield and supply dumps on Sawar. Rejoining the carriers later that morning, Biloxi helped screen them until returning to Manus on 28 April.

The task group headed north and struck the Japanese base at Truk on 29 April. Biloxi covered the carriers during these strikes and those launched against Ponape in the Caroline Islands the next day. She also observed battleships bombarding Ponape on 1 May. The warships steamed to the Marshalls, arriving in Kwajalein lagoon on the 4th. The light cruiser then loaded fuel, ammunition and supplies in preparation for "Operation Forager", the planned liberation of the Mariana Islands.

Tasked with eliminating Japanese air power in the Marianas, the 15 fleet carriers of Task Force 58 planned to attack airfields on Saipan, Tinian, and Guam. They also prepared for a major fleet battle if the Japanese carriers attempted to interfere with the American transports. Biloxi joined TG 58.2, which was built around the carriers Bunker Hill, Wasp, Monterey, and Cabot and covered the carriers during air strikes against Saipan and Tinian on the 12th. Several enemy raids were driven off by aircraft or shot down by anti-aircraft fire, including one Japanese aircraft shot down "in brilliant flames" by the destroyer Conyngham.

The light cruiser screened the carriers during the landing operations on Saipan beginning on the 15th. The next day, the task group heard reports that a large Japanese force was closing the Marianas from the Philippines. After rendezvous with the other three carrier groups about noon on 18 June, the warships took up a patrol station some 150 miles (240 km) west of Saipan. From that position, on the southern flank of the carrier forces, Biloxi participated in the Battle of the Philippine Sea.

==== Battle of the Philippine Sea, 19–20 June 1944 ====
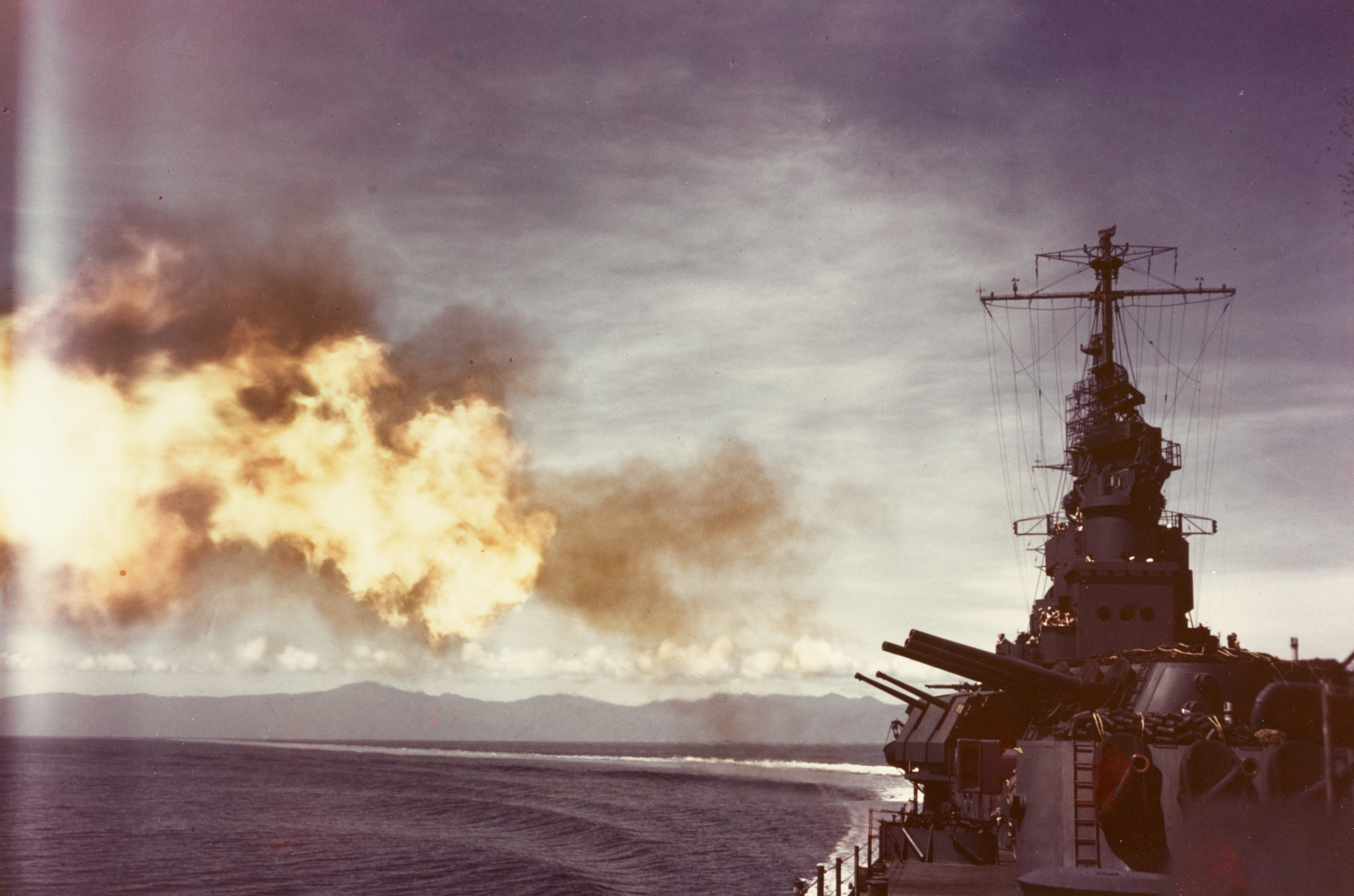
Biloxi firing 6 inch guns during shakedown, 1943

Although American search aircraft could not find the approaching enemy carriers, the presence of reconnaissance aircraft near the American carriers indicated the Japanese had found them. Late in the morning of 19 June, the first of 14 enemy raids registered on radar and began closing the task force. Most of these raids were destroyed or broken up by American fighters, severely disrupting the ensuing Japanese attacks, but several raids did get through.

Around noon, six Yokosuka D4Y "Judy" dive bombers evaded the American fighters and closed TG 58.2. Biloxi, along with several other escorts, fired on the two attacking Bunker Hill and both were shot down. At least four more Judys pounced on the task group later that afternoon but all were shot down by anti-aircraft fire without inflicting any damage. These were but a small portion of the 300 or so Japanese aircraft lost in the battle dubbed the "Great Marianas Turkey Shoot."

The next day, the American task force discovered the Japanese carrier force had retired west during the night. Late in the day, a sighting report at 16:13 led to a last-ditch 206-aircraft strike. These aircraft caught the retreating Japanese at dusk and sank the light carrier Hiyō and damaged another. The American aircraft then flew east for a difficult night landing. Many were later ditched owing to darkness or lack of fuel and Biloxi joined other warships in recovering crews from the water. After a futile stern chase of the Japanese on the 21st, the American warships gave up the pursuit and retired, arriving at Eniwetok on 27 June.

==== Marianas, June–July 1944 ====
The light cruiser stayed in the Marshalls only briefly, sailing west with TG 58.1 to the Bonin Islands on 30 June. She screened the carriers Yorktown, Hornet and Bataan while they launched fighter sweeps and other strikes against Iwo Jima on 3 July. Biloxi then joined a bombardment group of four light cruisers and seven destroyers and closed Iwo Jima the following day.

Just as firing began at 14:45, three Japanese fighters took off from Iwo Jima and closed the American Kingfisher spotter aircraft. Although Biloxi's Kingfisher safely retreated under the protection of friendly anti-aircraft fire, Santa Fe's spotter aircraft was heavily damaged by enemy fire and forced to make an emergency landing. The crew was later rescued by Burns. After the warships drove off the attacking Japanese fighters, the bombardment resumed and the observation aircraft reported target areas well covered, with many fires burning when the bombardment group retired.

After refueling at sea, the light cruiser spent the next two weeks screening the carriers during air strikes against Guam and Rota in the Marianas. On 24 July, the task group sailed south for strikes against Palau, Yap, and Ulithi. Japanese air operations during both these operations were limited and no enemy aircraft closed the task group.

On the morning of 27 July, Biloxi catapulted two Kingfishers to rescue a pilot sighted in the water just off the southwest tip of Yap Island. One Kingfisher, flown by Lt(jg). R. Dana, spotted the pilot at 09:05 and was able to land just outside the reef line surrounding the island. A Japanese anti-aircraft gun began firing at the Kingfisher, but was soon silenced by four circling American fighters. The downed flier managed to paddle his raft through the breaking swells and across the reef where he collapsed from exhaustion. Lt(jg). Dana taxied between the raft and the reef and managed to pull the pilot in with a line. He took off at 09:40 and successfully returned to the task group later that morning.

==== Volcano and Ryukyu Islands, July–October 1944 ====
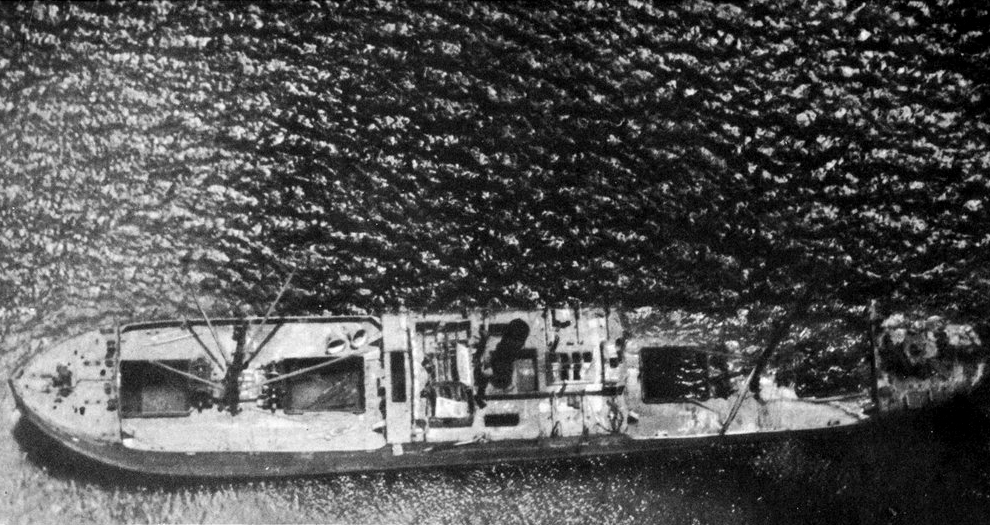
A Japanese Maru sinking. Although the Ships Book USS Biloxi reported that this vessel and an IJN Cruiser was sunk off Okinawa 1945, the Ships History credits two identified vessels sunk by the Biloxi 4 August 1944-the IJN Destroyer "Matsu" and the collier "Ryuko Maru"

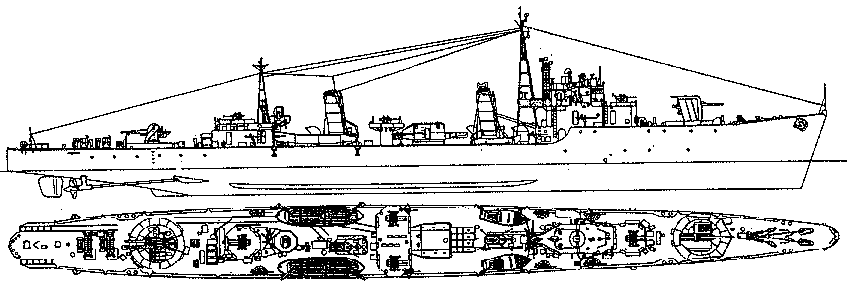
Japanese line drawing of the Matsu-class destroyer plan, showing twin 127 mm DP gun mount aft and single mount forward, quadruple centerline torpedo tubes, four triple and six twin Type 96 25 mm (0.98 in) anti-aircraft gun mounts, and twin depth charge racks on stern.

Following one more air strike on 28 July, heavy rain squalls and poor weather canceled further strikes and the task group turned for the Mariana Islands. After a quick replenishment stop at Saipan on 2 August, the task group steamed west for a strike against the Bonin and Volcano Islands. During a fighter sweep on 4 August, friendly aircraft reported a small enemy task group in the area. Late that afternoon, Biloxi, three other cruisers and seven destroyers closed the Bonins for an anti-shipping sweep. After the destroyers Brown and Izard destroyed a small sampan, the cruisers picked up a Japanese convoy on radar north of Muko Jima. Owing to the danger of enemy torpedo attack, the cruisers kept their distance and fired at long range. Their accurate gunfire quickly damaged and eventually sank escort destroyer Matsu and collier Ryuko Maru.

At 04:00 the following morning, while preparing for a bombardment mission against Ani and Chichi Jima, a Japanese "Betty" closed from the stern and passed over the light cruiser. Shortly thereafter a heavy underwater explosion, probably a torpedo, detonated in Biloxi's wake. The blast severely shook the warship but did no damage. The bombardment mission was carried out as planned later that morning and the cruisers rejoined the carriers that afternoon.

The task group then sailed east and arrived at Eniwetok on 9 August. After Biloxi refueled alongside the oiler Tappahannock, she moved to a berth in the lagoon to take on stores and provisions. The crew also received three weeks of rest and recreation.

Assigned to TG 38.4, the light cruiser got underway on 28 August in company with the carriers Franklin, San Jacinto and Enterprise, the cruiser New Orleans, and 12 destroyers. Steaming west, the task group closed the Bonins to neutralize Japanese installations there in advance of upcoming operations against Palau and the Philippines.

After Franklin and Enterprise launched a fighter sweep on the 31st, the cruisers closed and bombarded Chichi Jima. During that evolution, the warships were approached by a Japanese "Betty" but they drove the bomber off with anti-aircraft fire. The next day, the warships closed Iwo Jima and fired at targets ashore. During this operation, Biloxi's crew saw friendly aircraft strafing an enemy patrol craft. The destroyer Helm then closed the target and sank it with gunfire. At 15:00 that afternoon, a damaged Army B-24D Liberator four-engined bomber appeared over the task group and eleven crew members bailed out. Ten were rescued in the water and, despite extensive searches, the warships did not find the eleventh man. The task group then sailed east and moored at Saipan anchorage on 4 September.

The warships continued a fast pace of operations by sailing south to Yap the next day. Biloxi conducted an especially good bombardment mission during the morning of 7 September, starting numerous fires in a vehicle depot and an oil storage building. The light cruiser then took up a position to cover the carriers and screened them during air strikes against Palau between 10 and 15 September. During this time, Biloxi also launched Kingfishers to fly close in anti-submarine patrol. Following the amphibious landings on Palau on the 15th, the light cruiser headed to the Admiralty Islands for upkeep.

While en route, Biloxi crossed the equator on 20 September. According to the war diarist, "King Neptune, Davy Jones, and all the Royal Court were received aboard and dispensed justice with their customary ruthless and bloodthirsty manner. Among the initiates was the XO, Commander E.F. McDaniel, who until today had evaded His Majesty during 21 years of naval service. He was punished accordingly." The warship arrived at Manus the next day.

After taking on supplies and ammunition, Biloxi sailed to Kossol Passage on 24 September and joined TG 38.1. Once joined there by the other fast carriers of Task Force 38, the force proceeded west to Okinawa on 8 October. Arriving off the Ryukyu Islands two days later, Biloxi screened the carriers as they struck airfields and other installations ashore. That morning, two Kingfishers catapulted off the light cruiser to search for a downed pilot from Franklin. One aircraft landed and recovered the pilot but, owing to rough seas, the OS2U capsized during takeoff. Rather than risk the second floatplane—her last working aircraft—Biloxi allowed the two pilots to be rescued by the submarine Sterlet.

The carriers then shifted to Formosa on 12 October for two days of heavy attacks against Japanese airfields. Just before sunset on the 13th, seven "Betty" bombers appeared out of a rain squall and rapidly closed the carriers. Biloxi's forward 6-inch turrets as well as her 5-inch and 40-mm batteries took five of these aircraft under fire as they passed down her port side. One aircraft broke into flames and, after Biloxi checked fire to avoid hitting two nearby destroyers, all five were shot down by other warships in the formation.

==== Philippines, October 1944–January 1945 ====
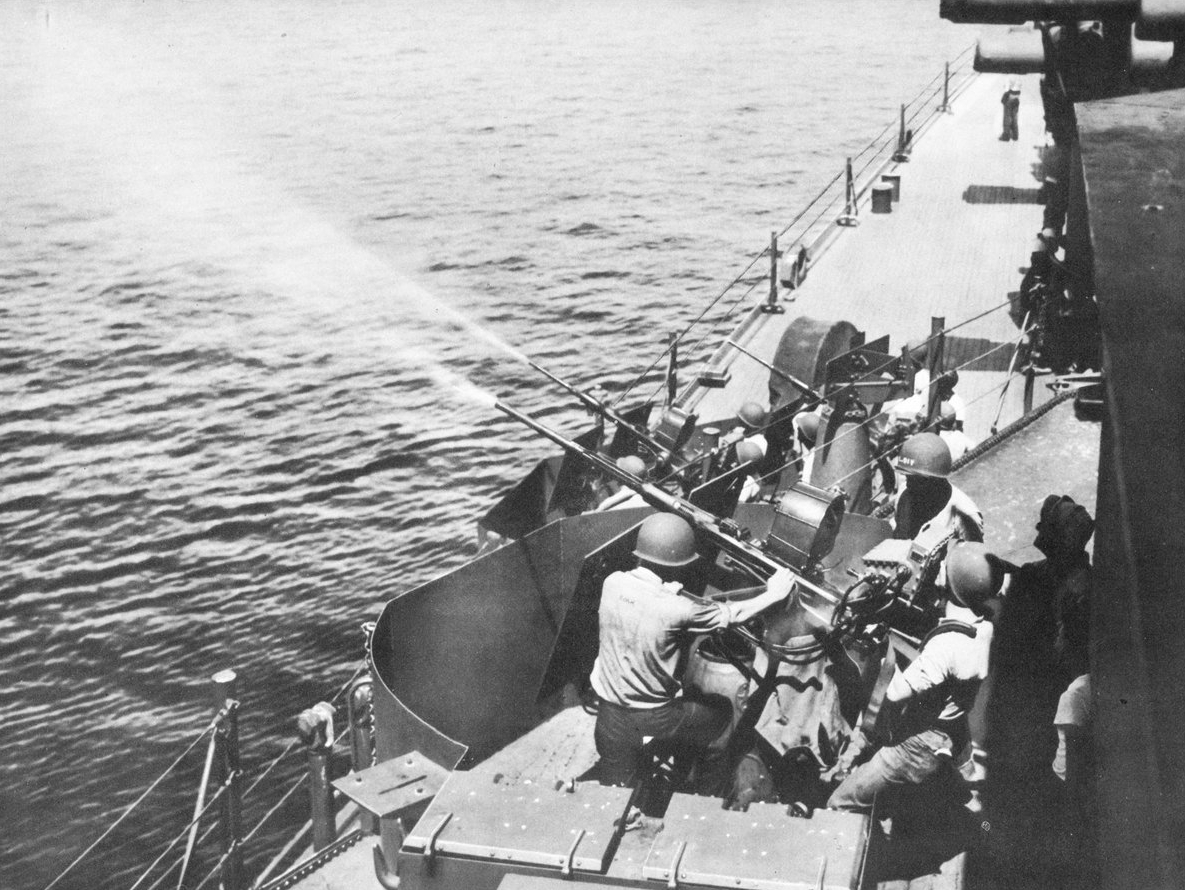
Biloxi's 20 mm guns firing, c.1944

Between 14 and 19 October, the light cruiser covered the carriers as they struck airfields on Luzon in preparation for the Leyte landings on 20th. Numerous small enemy raids plagued the task group but they inflicted no damage. On the 19th, Biloxi's remaining OS2U, accompanied by a seaplane from New Orleans, successfully picked up the crew of a crashed dive bomber and returned them to Franklin.

After covering Leyte strikes between 20 and 22 October, Biloxi detached and joined TG 38.2 built around Intrepid, Bunker Hill, Cabot, and Independence. Upon word that three groups of Japanese warships were closing the Philippines, this force concentrated east of Samar. On 24 October, during the second day of the Battle of Leyte Gulf, aircraft from Intrepid and Cabot took part in attacks that sank the Musashi south of Luzon. Other air attacks damage two other battleships.

That night, the task group steamed north off Cape Engano to hunt for fleeing enemy carriers, five of which are disposed of by air strikes the following day. Later that evening the American warships turned south in an attempt to catch a second group of retiring Japanese warships. Just after midnight on the 26th, Biloxi and four other cruisers and destroyers picked up a surface contact near San Bernardino Strait. The three cruisers quickly opened fire, destroying the Nowaki in a blinding explosion shortly thereafter. Nowaki had aboard her all of the survivors from the Tone-class heavy cruiser Chikuma, which had been sunk at the end of the Battle off Samar. As a result, a total of approximately 1,400 officers and men went down with her in this one action

On 28 October, TG 38.2 returned to launching air strikes against Luzon airfields and Japanese shipping in Manila Bay. Poor weather hampered aircraft recovery on the 29th, and the evening was spent rescuing ditched airmen. Following a withdrawal to refuel and receive replacement aircraft, the task group carried out two more rounds of Luzon strikes in the first weeks of November. These attacks pounded Japanese shipping and port facilities at Manila and central Luzon, sinking half a dozen light warships and over a dozen cargo ships and auxiliaries.

On the 15th, Biloxi departed the Philippines and steamed east to Ulithi. Arriving there two days later, she received much needed repairs and replenishment. Biloxi also recovered pilot Lt.(jg) Dana, who related an exciting cruise in Sterlet during which time the submarine sank at least two enemy cargo ships. While at Ulithi on 20 November, Biloxi's crew experienced the Japanese kaiten attack on the anchorage. All five midget submarines were lost in the attack, though not before the Japanese torpedoes damaged and eventually sank the tanker Mississinewa.

On 22 November, Biloxi joined TG 38.3 for another set of air strikes against Luzon. While carrier aircraft attacked enemy coastal shipping on the 25th, the light cruiser helped the task group fight off Japanese kamikazes. Numerous raids breached friendly fighter defenses that day and five American carriers were damaged, forcing the task group to retire from the area.

The carriers returned to the Philippines on 13 December and, in addition to air strikes in support of the Mindoro landings, they also launched special night raids against Japanese airfields. These attacks prevented enemy kamikaze dive bombers (called "green hornets") from launching the coordinated attacks that had plagued the American task groups in late November.

On 18 December, Biloxi's task force encountered a typhoon northeast of Samar and suffered heavy damage. In addition to the loss of three destroyers, many other warships were damaged and Biloxi herself lost an OS2U washed overboard. After spending the next few days searching for survivors, the light cruiser steamed to Ulithi on the 24th and remained there for the next week.

Biloxi put to sea with TG 38.3 on 30 December, intending to strike Formosa, Nansei Shoto, and northern Luzon. The task group, built around the carriers Essex, Ticonderoga and Langley launched the first strike against Formosa on 3 January 1945. The weather quickly worsened, however, and many of the planned attacks were canceled. The carriers steamed back south and, when the weather cleared on the 6th, blanketed Luzon with aircraft in support of bombardment and amphibious operations in Lingayen Gulf. These attacks did not achieve a lot of success, as enemy aircraft were carefully hidden and camouflaged, and the task group shifted strikes to airfields on Formosa, in the Ryukyus, and the Pescadores.

During the evening of 9 January, the task group passed through Bashi Channel of Luzon Strait and began a high speed run south. Two days later, carrier aviators struck targets between Cam Rahn Bay and Cape Varella, hitting many ground installations and virtually annihilating a coastal convoy north of Qui Nhơn. Nine Japanese ships were sunk in that attack, and another 13 were damaged. After retired to refuel, a task made more difficult owing to typhoon passing through area, the carriers shifted north to attack Hainan and Hong Kong. The following day, S1c Daniel A. Little was swept overboard by a wave and drowned. This was the first loss of life suffered by Biloxi's crew.

After refueling, the task group passed through Balintang Channel and conducted strikes against airfields on Formosa on 21 January. Around midday, Japanese kamikazes began attacking in increasing numbers and, in successive waves, two aircraft crashed into the carrier Ticonderoga and another damaged the destroyer Maddox. That evening, Biloxi detached to escort the two damaged warships to Ulithi, arriving there on the 26th.

==== Battle of Iwo Jima ====
On 10 February, Biloxi joined TG 58.4 and sailed for operations against Iwo Jima. Following carrier-launched fighter sweeps against Japanese airfields in the Tokyo area, the task group closed Iwo Jima to support landing operations. During the morning of 19 February, Biloxi provided naval gunfire support for the troops ashore. She then shifted to harassing fire that evening. This pattern of operations continued until the 21st when 5 inch mount #6 fired into the barrels of gun mount #5, slightly injuring several sailors and destroying the latter mount.

Despite the damage, Biloxi then rejoined TG 58.4 and returned to the Tokyo area to attack aircraft factories and airfields starting on the 25th. Increasingly heavy weather limited and then canceled strikes that afternoon and the force retired south. After hitting ground installations, airfields and shipping at Okinawa, the task group split up and Biloxi steamed to Ulithi, arriving there on 1 March. She replenished, loaded ammunition and repaired mount #5.

Biloxi then departed from Iwo Jima and headed to Ulithi for repairs. Biloxi together with her sister ships Santa Fe and Mobile protect the USS Franklin (CV-13). On 19 March 1945, Franklin was hit by 2 bombs and listed 13 degrees to starboard side. Biloxi together with her sister ships, protecting the Franklin and helped saving the survivors on the carrier. Biloxi lowered her whaleboats to help the Big Ben to save 270 sailors. After this event, her captain was awarded with the Silver Star. Heavy cruiser Pittsburgh towed the Franklin until Franklin got to Ulithi on 22 March 1945.

==== End of the war ====
Biloxi stayed in Ulithi until 23rd March. After receiving battle repairs alongside Vulcan, the light cruiser continued east, arriving at San Francisco via Pearl Harbor on 11 May while escorting the USS Franklin (CV-13). Moving into the Bethlehem Shipbuilding Corporation yard the warship received three weeks of long overdue repairs and machinery maintenance. Following completion of this work on 6 July, Biloxi conducted two weeks of post overhaul checks and refresher training out of San Diego and San Clemente. These evolutions were disrupted on 14 July when a water feed line ruptured in the aft fire room, flashed into steam and burned eight men, none seriously.

Returning west on 19 July, Biloxi practiced shore bombardment exercises in Hawaii before departing Pearl Harbor on 2 August. While en route to Ulithi, the warship conducted a long range shore bombardment of Wake on 8 August, primarily to train her gunners for upcoming operations against Japan. After a stop at Ulithi on 12 August, she refueled and headed for Leyte, arriving in San Pedro Bay on 14th. While anchored there, the crew heard the Japanese surrender announcement at 08:15 the following morning.

Biloxi received nine battle stars for her service in the Pacific during World War II.

=== Post-war career ===
Departing the Philippines for Okinawa on 20 August, the light cruiser arrived there three days later and spent the next three weeks awaiting orders. Putting to sea on 16 September, Biloxi proceeded to Nagasaki, Japan, to evacuate POWs. Arriving there on the 18th, her crew saw the damage caused by the atomic bomb and took on 11 U.S., 17 British, one Australian, one Canadian, and 187 Dutch "recovered Allied military personnel." These men were delivered to Okinawa on 21 September. Steaming back to Japan, the warship made stops at Nagasaki, Wakayama, and Hiro Wan as the American Occupation Forces consolidated their positions ashore. During October, some officers from ships' company took part in inspections of surviving Japanese shipping at Kure. Underway on 9 November, Biloxi picked up passengers at Okinawa on the 11th, before sailing to Pearl Harbor and then San Francisco, arriving at the latter port on 27 November.

The warship moved to Port Angeles, Washington, on 15 January 1946 and reported for inactivation. On 18 May 1946 she was placed in commission in reserve at the Puget Sound Naval Shipyard, and on 29 October 1946 went out of commission in reserve. Her name stricken from the Navy List on 1 December 1961, and she was sold for scrap to Puget Sound Towing & Barge Co. on 29 March 1962.

The cruiser's superstructure was set aside and erected in the Guice Park near the Biloxi Small Craft Harbor, on Beach Boulevard (U.S. Highway 90) just east of the Hard Rock Casino, where it still stands today. The ship's bell is housed in the lobby of the Biloxi Maritime and Seafood Museum.
