= USS Alcyone =

WWII US attack cargo ship

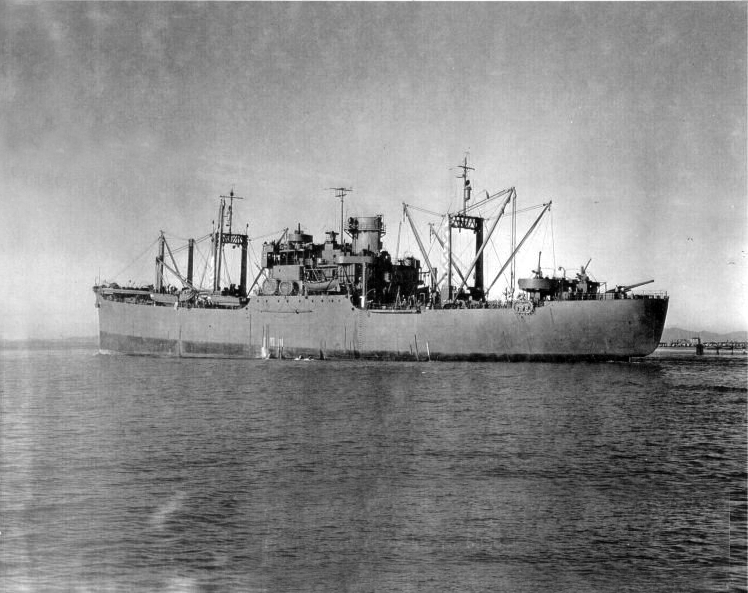
- USS Alcyone (AK-7)

History

United States
- Name: USS Alcyone
- Namesake: Alcyone, the brightest star in the Pleiades cluster, in the constellation Taurus
- Builder: Sun Shipbuilding & Drydock Co., Chester, Pennsylvania
- Laid down: 12 January 1939, as SS Mormacgull
- Launched: 28 August 1939
- Acquired: by purchase, 31 May 1941
- Commissioned: 15 June 1941
- Decommissioned: 23 July 1946
- Renamed: USS Alcyone (AK-24), 3 June 1941
- Reclassified: AKA-7 (attack cargo ship), 26 November 1942
- Stricken: 15 August 1946
- Honours and awards: 8 battle stars (World War II)
- Fate: Sold into merchant service, 17 March 1947; Scrapped, 1969

General characteristics
- Class & type: Arcturus-class attack cargo ship
- Type: Type C2 ship
- Displacement: 14,225 long tons (14,453 t) full
- Length: 459 ft 1 in (139.93 m)
- Beam: 63 ft (19 m)
- Draft: 26 ft 5 in (8.05 m)
- Speed: 16.5 knots (30.6 km/h; 19.0 mph)
- Complement: 399
- Armament: 1 × 5-inch/38-caliber gun mount; 4 × 3 in (76 mm) gun mounts

USS Alcyone (AKA-7) was an Arcturus-class attack cargo ship named after Alcyone, the brightest star in the star cluster Pleiades. She served as a commissioned ship for five years and one month.

== Construction and commissioning ==
The ship was laid down as Mormacgull under a Maritime Commission contract (MC hull 30) on 12 January 1939 at Chester, Pennsylvania, by the Sun Shipbuilding & Drydock Co., Hull 179; launched on 28 August 1939; sponsored by Miss Barbara Ann Moore; delivered 13 October 1939 to owner/operator Moore-McCormack Lines, Inc.; purchased by the Navy on 31 May 1941; renamed Alcyone and designated AK-24 on 3 June 1941; converted for naval service by the Boston Navy Yard; and placed in commission on 15 June 1941, Comdr. Daniel M. McGurl in command.

== Service history ==
=== 1941 ===
The cargo ship then reported for duty to Commander, Train, Atlantic Fleet. Following shakedown training, she departed New York City on 4 September and shaped a course for Iceland. The vessel arrived at Reykjavík on the 16th and began disembarking passengers and discharging cargo. Upon the completion of this task, she left Icelandic waters on 5 October, sailed southwest-ward across the Atlantic, and arrived at Charleston, South Carolina, on the 13th. After one month of voyage repairs, the ship moved, via Norfolk, Virginia, to New York City to take on cargo and sailed on 28 November for the Caribbean. Among her ports of call during the cruise were Guantánamo Bay, Cuba; Jamaica; San Juan and Vieques, Puerto Rico; St. Thomas, Virgin Islands; Antigua; and Trinidad before she arrived back at New York on 27 December.

=== 1942 ===
During the first three months of 1942, Alcyone made two more voyages from New York and Norfolk to various points in the Caribbean. Among her assignments during these trips was the evacuation of civilians from Antigua to the United States. On one occasion, her convoy was attacked by German submarines. Although three consorts fell victim to torpedo attacks, Alcyone completed her trip unscathed and arrived back at Charleston on 12 April where she underwent availability.

Alcyone was assigned to the Naval Transportation Service on 1 June and set sail from Norfolk on the 10th in a convoy bound for New Zealand with troops and equipment of the 1st Marine Division which would land on Guadalcanal early in August. She transited the Panama Canal on 18 June, joined the Pacific Fleet, and reached Wellington on H July. After discharging her cargo, the ship moved to Auckland, New Zealand, to take on material for transportation to advanced bases in the Pacific.

Alcyone sailed independently from Auckland on 31 July and proceeded to Nouméa, New Caledonia, and Espiritu Santo to distribute her cargo. Following these stops, she arrived at Sydney, Australia, on the 28th and underwent voyage repairs. On 8 September, the vessel left Australia; shaped a course for the West Coast of the United States; and reached San Francisco, California, on 29 September. She then entered the Mare Island Navy Yard, Vallejo, California, for conversion to an attack cargo ship. During the yard work, three 30-ton booms, a boat repair shop, and additional berthing space were added. Alcyone was redesignated AKA-7 on 26 November and was reassigned to Amphibious Forces, Pacific Fleet.

The conversion work was completed early in November, and Alcyone departed San Francisco on the 6th. She was then involved in amphibious exercises and shakedown training off San Diego, California. The ship left California on 21 December and headed for the East Coast of the United States.

=== 1943 ===
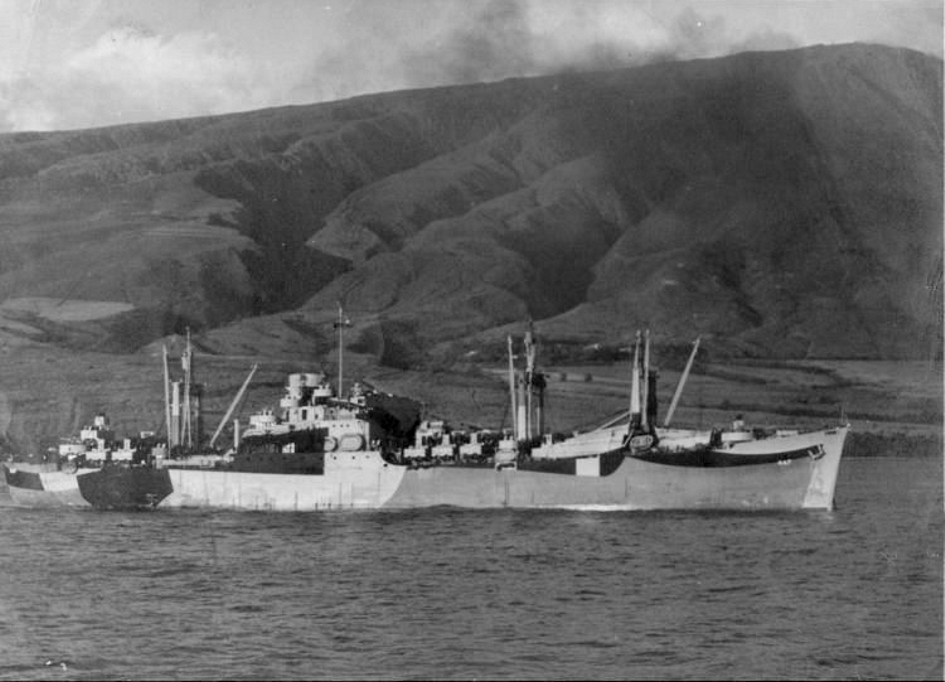
USS Alcyone (AKA-7)

Alcyone retransited the Panama Canal on 2 March, arrived at the Charleston Navy Yard on the 9th, and underwent repairs for a month before sailing to Norfolk in mid-April. Soon after reaching Norfolk, Alcyone began a period of training exercises in the Chesapeake Bay which lasted until early June. She sailed with Task Force 65 on the 8th for the Mediterranean. Her convoy repulsed several enemy attacks en route before arriving safely at Oran, Algeria, on 22 June. She took part in amphibious landing exercises and loaded her cargo holds in preparation for the upcoming assault on Sicily.

Alcyone got underway on 5 July; arrived off Scoglitti, Sicily, five days later; and began discharging her cargo despite rough seas and frequent enemy air harassment. She landed her equipment and troops with the loss of only a few small boats, left the area on the 13th, and arrived back at Oran on 16 July. From there, the vessel moved on to Norfolk, where she arrived on 3 August.

After a brief period in port, the attack cargo ship proceeded once again to the Pacific. She transited the Panama Canal on the last day of August and stopped at San Francisco before continuing on to Hawaii. Alcyone touched at Pearl Harbor on 30 September and participated in training exercises off Maui during October. She got underway on 10 November with Task Group (TG) 52.11 to participate in the invasion of Makin Island, Gilbert Islands. On the 20th, the vessel reached the transport area off that island and began unloading her cargo. Members of her crew also assisted other vessels in discharging their passengers and supplies. Despite heavy enemy resistance, Alcyone successfully completed her operations and left the area on the 24th.

After a brief layover at Pearl Harbor, Alcyone continued on to San Diego, where she arrived on 19 December. She remained there through the Christmas holidays.

=== 1944 ===
Alcyone sailed for Hawaii on 13 January 1944. Upon reaching Pearl Harbor, the ship made final preparations for the assault on Kwajalein. She sortied from Oahu on 22 January and reached the transport area off Kwajalein on the 31st. Alcyone unloaded her cargo and assisted in the landing of troops from other ships as well. Enemy shore fire and dangerous coral reefs somewhat delayed her operations, and Alcyone remained in the area until mid-February.

The cargo ship made a port call at Pearl Harbor before continuing on to the California coast. She reached San Pedro on 26 February and proceeded to a shipyard at Terminal Island for overhaul. A series of amphibious landing exercises followed the completion of the yard work, and Alcyone left the West Coast on 18 April, bound for Hawaii. She reached Pearl Harbor and joined forces preparing to attack Guam in the Marianas.

The cargo ship anchored off that island on 22 July and commenced unloading operations. Upon completing this assignment, she got underway to return to Hawaii. She arrived at Pearl Harbor on 10 August and, shortly thereafter, entered drydock for minor repairs. The ship got underway again on 15 September and sailed to Manus, Admiralty Islands. After approximately a month of preparations and training, she sailed on 14 October as a member of TG 79.2, which was scheduled to begin the liberation of the Philippine Islands.

The attacking force reached waters off the beaches of Leyte on the 20th and began the landing operations that same day. Alcyone discharged her cargo while undergoing enemy air attack and mortar fire from shore batteries. She completed her unloading operations on the 22d and proceeded to Hollandia, New Guinea, to reprovision. On 14 November, the ship sailed for Leyte to resupply the beachhead which had been established there.

After unloading her cargo at Leyte, she retired to the Admiralties and reached Manus on the 24th. From that island, she moved to Cape Gloucester, New Britain, to take on units of the 40th Infantry Division. The ship carried these troops back to Manus, where she joined TG 79.4. On 16 December the group sailed to Huon Gulf, New Guinea, for a series of amphibious landing exercises. Upon their completion, the ships returned to Manus for final loadout prior to the invasion of Luzon, the largest island of the Philippines.

=== 1945 ===
On the last day of 1944, Alcyone sortied with TG 79.4, for the assault on the Lingayen beaches which began on 9 January 1945. The task of unloading her cargo was made more difficult by rough seas, Japanese suicide boat attacks, and enemy air raids. Alcyone remained in the area for five days before she finished emptying her holds. On the 13th, she set a course for Leyte where she replenished her stores before returning to Luzon on the 29th with a small attacking force for a landing at Zambales. The assault was unopposed, and operations were completed on 31 January.

Alcyone left Philippine waters on 11 February, bound for the United States. She made port calls at Manus and at Pearl Harbor before reaching San Francisco on 12 March. The ship then entered the Moore Dry Dock Company, Oakland, California, for overhaul. During this yard period, her kingposts were replaced by quadruped masts, her troop berths were removed, and temporary cargo storage cages were installed.

Upon completion of the yard work on 2 June, the ship was assigned to Service Forces, Pacific Fleet. On the 8th, Alcyone was routed to Seattle, Washington, for loading. She departed Seattle on 21 June and shaped a course for Ulithi. After pausing there briefly on 9 July, she got underway to rendezvous with logistic support ships provisioning the warships of the Fast Carrier Task Force in waters off the Japanese home islands.

Alcyone completed unloading at sea on 2 August and set sail for Guam to replenish. While the ship was in the Marianas, Japan capitulated. Alcyone rejoined the logistics group on 23 August; and, three days later, she and her consorts entered Tokyo Bay. After unloading, Alcyone left Japan and returned to Guam to take on more cargo and supplies. She arrived back in Tokyo Bay on 1 October and began replenishing ships of the occupation forces.

=== 1946 ===
Alcyone remained in Japanese waters through early March 1946. She shuttled supplies and equipment among the ports of Yokosuka, Ominato, Aomori, Otaru, Wakayama, Sasebo, and Kure. The ship departed Yokosuka on 11 March and headed back to the United States. She arrived at San Francisco on 29 March and began a period of upkeep. On 15 May, the vessel proceeded to San Diego where she remained for two weeks. Alcyone continued sailing southward and transited the Panama Canal on 9 June. Five days later, she made port at Norfolk, Virginia.

Preparations to deactivate the ship soon began. Alcyone was decommissioned at the Norfolk Navy Yard, Portsmouth, Virginia, on 23 July 1946 and was transferred to the War Shipping Administration on 24 July 1946 for disposal. Her name was struck from the Navy List on 15 August 1946.

The ship was sold to the Johnson Line on 17 March 1947, and refitted for service as the merchant vessel Star Alcyone, and later scrapped in 1969.

== Honors and awards ==
- Combat Action Ribbon
- Navy Unit Commendation
- American Defense Service Medal with "A" device
- American Campaign Medal
- European–African–Middle Eastern Campaign Medal with one battle star for World War II service
- Asiatic-Pacific Campaign Medal with seven battle stars for World War II service
- World War II Victory Medal
- Navy Occupation Service Medal with "ASIA" clasp
- Philippine Republic Presidential Unit Citation (Republic of the Philippines)
- Philippine Liberation Medal with two stars for World War II service (Republic of the Philippines)
