= Hugh Martin McGurk =

Irish former dual player of Gaelic games

Personal information
- Native name: Aodh Mairtín Mac Uirc (Irish)
- Born: Lavey, County Londonderry, Northern Ireland

Sport
- Football Position: Corner back
- Hurling Position: ?
Clubs
- Years: Club
- 19xx-19xx (F) 19xx-19xx (H) xxxx-20xx (F): Lavey GAC; Lavey; St Brigid's
Club titles
	Football	Hurling
Derry titles	5	6?
Ulster titles	2	-
All-Ireland titles	1	-
Inter-county titles
	Football	Hurling
Ulster Titles	1	-

Hugh Martin McGurk is an Irish former dual player of Gaelic games who played Gaelic football and hurling for Erin's Own Lavey and the Derry GAA team, of which he captained in the 1980s, and won the Ulster Senior Football Championship with in 1987.

McGurk won the All-Ireland Senior Club Football Championship in 1991 with Erin's Own Lavey and also won two Ulster Senior Club Football Championships and five Derry Senior Football Championships. He also helped the club win the Derry Senior Hurling Championship six times.

McGurk represented Ireland in international rules football.

== Personal life ==
McGurk was born in Lavey and attended school at St Patrick's College, Maghera, in County Londonderry. He later went to University of Ulster Jordanstown and Queen's University Belfast. All six of his brothers were keen sportsmen. Anthony won All Star awards in 1973 and 1975. Johnny and Collie were part of the Derry team that won the 1993 All-Ireland Senior Football Championship.

== Football career ==
=== Club ===
McGurk won five Derry Senior Football Championship medals with Lavey (1977, 1988, 1990, 1992 and 1993). He was the top scorer in the 1988 Derry Championship with a tally of 1-19 (22 points). In 1990 the club won the Ulster Senior Club Football Championship and went on to win the All-Ireland Senior Club Football Championship the following March. In 1992 the club added a second Ulster Club Championship but were unsuccessful in their pursuit of another All-Ireland. The All-Ireland Club title was no doubt his biggest achievement in sport and six of his brothers were teammates on the victorious panel.

In later years, McGurk joined St Brigid's in Belfast and helped them win the Antrim Junior Championship in 2004.

=== Inter-county ===
McGurk played for Derry in the 1985 Ulster Senior Football Championship final, but the county were beaten by Monaghan. Two years later however he won an Ulster Championship medal as Derry defeated Armagh in the final. They went on to face Meath in the All-Ireland semi-final but were defeated. That year he was nominated for an All Star at corner back.

He also won National League Division 2 and Division 3 honours with the county.

In later years he played for the Derry Masters (Over 40s) team.

=== School/College ===
In 1977 McGurk was part of the first ever St Pat's team to win the MacRory Cup. He later played for both the University of Ulster Jordanstown (UUJ) and Queen's University Belfast and won the Trench Cup with UUJ in 1981.

=== International ===
McGurk also represented Ireland in international rules football against Australia.

== Hurling career ==
=== Club ===
McGurk won six Derry Senior Hurling Championship medals with Lavey (years?).

=== Inter-county ===
McGurk played for Derry hurlers in various positions over a 14-year period. Among his honours are helping the county win the All-Ireland Junior Hurling Championship.

=== School/College ===
McGurk played hurling for both the University of Ulster Jordanstown (UUJ) and Queen's University Belfast.

== Soccer career ==
McGurk was also an accomplished association footballer and had spells with Portstewart United, Tobermore United and Ballymena United. He held the cup scoring record for Portstewart, with six goals in one game.
