= Frank McGurk =

Frank McGurk may refer to:

- Frank McGurk (racing driver) (1915–1982), American racecar driver
- Frank C. J. McGurk, American psychologist
- Frank McGurk (boxer), British boxer and Olympic competitor in 1908

== See also ==
- Francis McGurk (1909–1978), Scotland international footballer
