= Japanese destroyer Matsu (1944) =

Japanese lead ship of Matsu-class

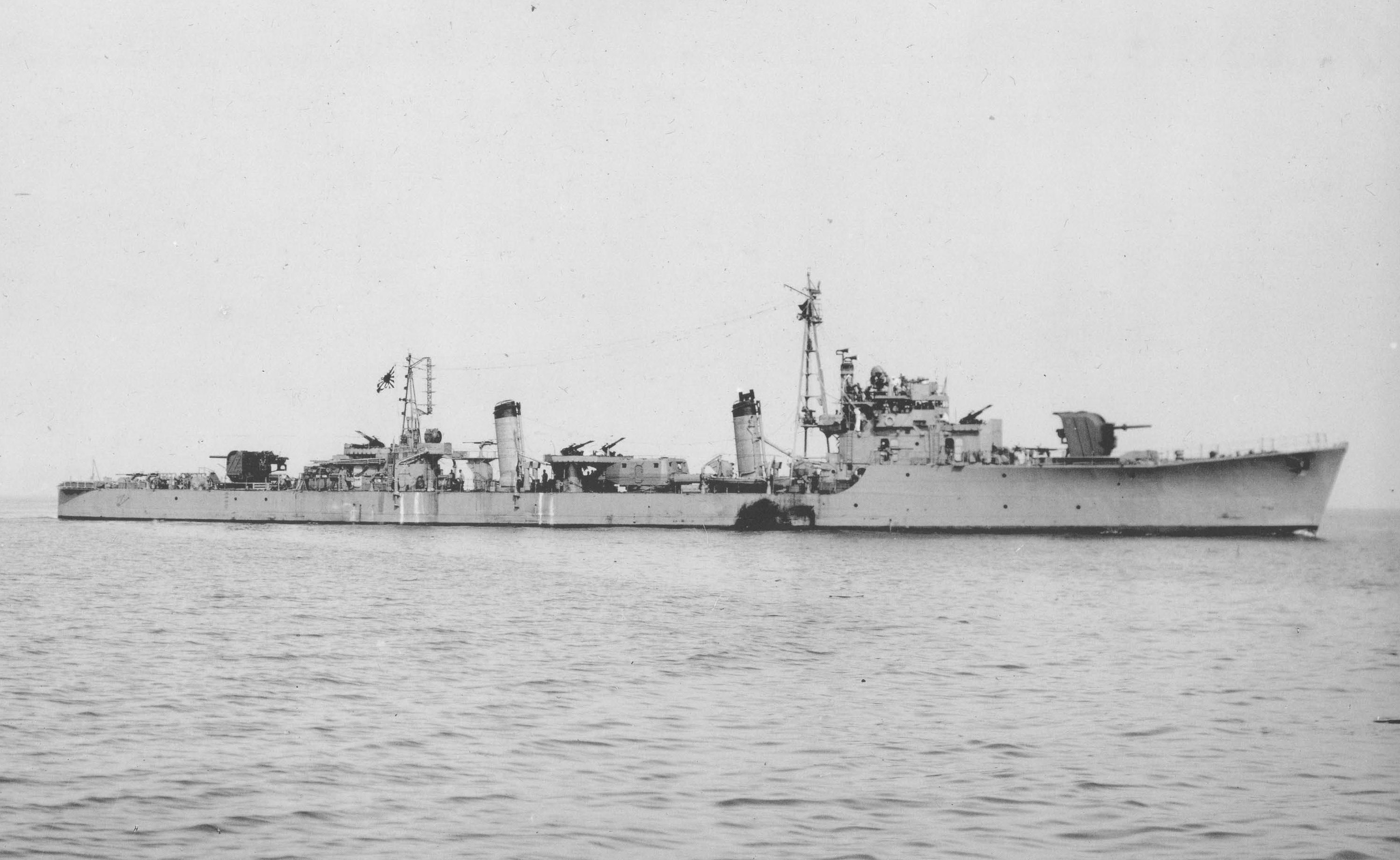
- Sister ship Momi, 4 September 1944

History

Empire of Japan
- Name: Matsu
- Ordered: 1943
- Builder: Maizuru Naval Arsenal
- Laid down: 8 August 1943
- Launched: 3 February 1944
- Completed: 28 April 1944
- Stricken: 10 October 1944
- Fate: Sunk by gunfire, 4 August 1944

General characteristics
- Class & type: Matsu-class escort destroyer
- Displacement: 1,282 t (1,262 long tons) (standard)
- Length: 100 m (328 ft 1 in) (o/a)
- Beam: 9.35 m (30 ft 8 in)
- Draft: 3.3 m (10 ft 10 in)
- Installed power: 2 × water-tube boilers; 19,000 shp (14,000 kW)
- Propulsion: 2 shafts, 2 × geared steam turbines
- Speed: 27.8 knots (51.5 km/h; 32.0 mph)
- Range: 4,680 nmi (8,670 km; 5,390 mi) at 16 knots (30 km/h; 18 mph)
- Complement: 210
- Sensors & processing systems: 1 × Type 22 search radar; 1 × Type 13 early-warning radar
- Armament: 1 × twin, 1 × single 127 mm (5 in) DP guns; 4 × triple, 13 × single 25 mm (1 in) AA guns; 1 × quadruple 610 mm (24 in) torpedo tubes; 2 × rails, 2 × throwers for 36 depth charges

Matsu (松; "pine tree") was the lead ship of her class of 18 Matsu-class escort destroyers built for the Imperial Japanese Navy (IJN) during the final stages of World War II. Completed in 1944, the ship was assigned to convoy escort duties in July. She was sunk with the loss of most of her crew on 4 August by three American destroyers while protecting a convoy returning from Chichijima.

== Design and description ==
Designed for ease of production, the Matsu class was smaller, slower and more lightly armed than previous destroyers as the IJN intended them for second-line duties like escorting convoys, releasing the larger ships for missions with the fleet. The ships measured 100 meters (328 ft 1 in) long overall, with a beam of 9.35 meters (30 ft 8 in) and a draft of 3.3 meters (10 ft 10 in). Their crew numbered 210 officers and enlisted men. They displaced 1,282 metric tons (1,262 long tons) at standard load and 1,554 metric tons (1,529 long tons) at deep load. The ships had two Kampon geared steam turbines, each driving one propeller shaft, using steam provided by two Kampon water-tube boilers. The turbines were rated at a total of 19,000 shaft horsepower (14,000 kW) for a speed of 27.8 knots (51.5 km/h; 32.0 mph). The Matsus had a range of 4,680 nautical miles (8,670 km; 5,390 mi) at 16 knots (30 km/h; 18 mph).

The main armament of the Matsu-class ships consisted of three 127-millimeter (5 in) Type 89 dual-purpose guns in one twin-gun mount aft and one single mount forward of the superstructure. The single mount was partially protected against spray by a gun shield. The accuracy of the Type 89 guns was severely reduced against aircraft because no high-angle gunnery director was fitted. Early production ships carried a total of twenty 25-millimeter (1 in) Type 96 anti-aircraft guns in four triple and eight single mounts. The early Matsus were only equipped with a Type 13 early-warning radar. These ships received five additional single 25 mm mounts and a Type 22 surface-search radar by late 1944. The ships were also armed with a single rotating quadruple mount amidships for 610-millimeter (24 in) torpedoes. They could deliver their 36 depth charges via two stern rails and two throwers.

== Construction and career ==
Authorized in the late 1942 Modified 5th Naval Armaments Supplement Program, Matsu (Pine Tree) was laid down on 8 August 1943 at the Maizuru Naval Arsenal and launched on 3 February 1944. Upon her completion on 28 April 1944, Matsu was assigned to Destroyer Squadron 11 of the Combined Fleet for training. At completion of training on 15 July, the ship was assigned to Destroyer Division 43, part of Destroyer Squadron 11.

Matsu sailed from Tokyo Bay on 29 July as the flagship of the 2nd Convoy Escort Group, commanded by Rear Admiral Ichimatsu Takahashi, escorting Convoy No. 4804 to Chichijima. After arriving on 1 August, the convoy was returning to Japan three days later when it was spotted by a search plane from the American Task Force 58's Task Group 58.1 (TG 58.1). A series of airstrikes were launched that sank all but one of the cargo ships and damaged three of the escorts. The survivors continued north towards Japan hoping to escape under the cover of darkness.

The convoy was caught later that day by a group of four light cruisers and seven destroyers that had been scheduled to bombard Chichijima the following morning. Matsu turned about to engage the pursuers while Takahashi probably ordered the other ships to disperse. The American ships opened fire at 18:28, but the outgunned Matsu did not reply for another nine minutes. About 19:10 the destroyer turned eastward, crossing the Americans' T in a possible attempt to fire her torpedoes and to lure the Americans away from the scattering Japanese ships. At 19:44 the Americans detached three destroyers to finish off Matsu, which was only capable of 15 knots (28 km/h; 17 mph) by this time, while resuming the pursuit.

The coordinated gunfire of Cogswell, Ingersoll and Knapp caused a large fire aboard Matsu at 19:56 and she went dead in the water two minutes later. As the American ships closed, they found the destroyer sinking with her bow vertical at 20:30 and turned away to rejoin the other ships. Matsu vanished from sight twelve minutes later, 50 miles (80 km) northwest of Chichijima at 27°40′N 141°48′E. Only six survivors from the ship's crew were rescued, and one later died of his wounds. Matsu was stricken from the navy list on 10 October.

== Bibliography ==
- Jentschura, Hansgeorg; Jung, Dieter & Mickel, Peter (1977). Warships of the Imperial Japanese Navy, 1869–1945. Annapolis, Maryland: United States Naval Institute. ISBN 0-87021-893-X.
- Nevitt, Allyn D. & Tully, Anthony (2014). "IJN Matsu: Tabular Record of Movement". www.combinedfleet.com.
- Stille, Mark (2013). Imperial Japanese Navy Destroyers 1919–45 (2): Asahio to Tachibana Classes. Botley, UK: Osprey Publishing. ISBN 978-1-84908-987-6.
- Sturton, Ian (1980). "Japan". In Chesneau, Roger (ed.). Conway's All the World's Fighting Ships 1922–1946. Greenwich, UK: Conway Maritime Press. ISBN 0-85177-146-7.
- Whitley, M. J. (1988). Destroyers of World War Two: An International Encyclopedia. Annapolis, Maryland: Naval Institute Press. ISBN 0-87021-326-1.
