= Daniel M. McGurl =

United States Navy admiral

Daniel Michael McGurl
- Born: October 2, 1896; Minersville, Pennsylvania
- Died: April 17, 1976 (aged 79); Lower Merion, Pennsylvania
- Burial place: Arlington National Cemetery
- Military career
- Allegiance: United States
- Branch: United States Navy
- Service years: 1919–1949
- Rank: Rear admiral
- Commands: USS Alcyone; USS Biloxi
- Conflicts: World War II
- Awards: Silver Star; Legion of Merit (2)

Daniel Michael McGurl (October 2, 1896 – April 17, 1976) was a United States Navy admiral who received multiple citations for valor, including two Legion of Merit awards.

== Biography ==
McGurl was born in Minersville, Pennsylvania and graduated from United States Naval Academy in 1919.

During World War II, McGurl commanded the attack cargo ship Alcyone (AKA-7), and the light cruiser Biloxi (CL-80) from her commissioning on 31 August 1943 to October 1944, and was later promoted to rear admiral. He retired on 30 June 1949.

== Death and interment ==
At the time of his death on April 17, 1976, he lived in Lower Merion, Pennsylvania. He was interred at the Arlington National Cemetery.

== Awards ==
McGurl received the Legion of Merit in 1943 for his actions while in command of Alcyone during the Allied invasion of Sicily, and second Legion of Merit for his command of Biloxi in the Pacific in 1944. He also received the Silver Star for successfully repelling an attempted attack by Japanese aircraft on the Fast Carrier Task Force on October 13, 1944.
