= Murder of Anna McGurk =

1991 murder in Gloucester, England

On 28 August 1991, 23-year-old Anna McGurk was raped and murdered by Andrew Hagans in Gloucester, UK. At the time, Hagans was on bail after he was arrested for the rape of a 20-year-old-woman less than a month previously. He had a long history of violent crime, and had been imprisoned for burglary.

Hagans was sentenced to life imprisonment for Anna's murder, with a concurrent 10-year sentence for the previous rape. Following a campaign by Kay Potts, Anna McGurk's mother, the crime led to changes in English law. Michael Stephen, MP for Shoreham, moved the Bail (Amendment) Bill, which became the Bail (Amendment) Act 1993. This allowed the police and the Crown Prosecution Service to challenge a decision by magistrates to grant bail to an alleged offender.

The Anna McGurk Trust, founded in her memory, awards bursaries to pupils of St Peter's High School, where McGurk had been a pupil. There is a small memorial stone in Gloucester.
