= Lavey, County Londonderry =

Lavey
- Roman Catholic ecclesiastical parish
- Location in Northern Ireland
- Coordinates: 54°50′31″N 6°33′43″W
- Country: Northern Ireland
- County: County Londonderry
- District: Mid-Ulster
- Time zone: UTC+0 (WET)
  - Summer (DST): UTC-1 (IST (WEST))

Lavey (from Irish Leamhaigh, meaning 'Place of Elms') is a Roman Catholic parish in County Londonderry, Northern Ireland. Lavey is bordered by the parishes of Castledawson, Maghera, Ballyscullion (Bellaghy), Greenlough and Kilrea. The parish contains no particularly large settlements, although it accommodates a number of small villages and hamlets, in order of size, these are: Gulladuff, Knockloughrim, Culnady, Tamlaght O'Crilly and Curran. The parish contains around fifteen different townlands. The parish is also closely associated with the civil parish of Termoneeny which covers the southern half of Lavey. There is also a parish called Lavey in County Cavan.

== Sport ==
Lavey GAC is the local Gaelic Athletic Association club, with twenty-three teams: Gaelic football, hurling, camogie and ladies football teams of many age groups. The club has had many successes, and players from it have gone on to become GAA all stars.

Termoneeny Cycling Club - Formed in 2009 with over 50 members.

== People ==
- Phelim Boyle - Irish economist and distinguished professor and actuary, and a pioneer of quantitative finance. He is best known for initiating the use of Monte Carlo methods in option pricing.
- Henry Downey - Captain of the Derry GAA team's 1993 All-Ireland winning team. All Star winner and Texaco Footballer of the Year for 1993.
- Johnny McGurk - All Star winner and member of Derry's 1993 All-Ireland winning team.
- Anthony McGurk - Two-time All Star winning Gaelic footballer.
- Kevin McCloy - All Star winner and current Derry footballer.
