= Anthony McGurk =

Derry Gaelic footballer

Personal information
- Nickname: Benny
- Born: County Londonderry, Northern Ireland
- Occupations: Town Clerk and Chief Executive of Derry City Council

Sport
- Sport: Gaelic football
- Position: Half back
Club
Years	Club	Apps (scores)
?–?	Lavey	?
Club titles
- Derry titles: 2/3/4?
- Ulster titles: 1/2?
- All-Ireland Titles: 2
Inter-county
Years	County	Apps (scores)
?–?	Derry	?
Inter-county titles
- Ulster titles: 3
- All Stars: 2

Anthony 'Tony' McGurk is a former Gaelic footballer who played for the Derry county team in the 1970s and 1980s. He won three Ulster Championships with the side (1970, 1975 and 1976). McGurk played club football with Erin's Own GAC Lavey, where he won the All-Ireland Senior Club Football Championship in 1991, as well as Ulster Club and Derry Club Championships.

McGurk won All-Stars in 1973 and 1975 and hence became the first player to win All-Star awards in different positions.

He now lives in Derry City and has been one of the leading figures behind the scenes in the Steelstown club.

== Personal life ==
McGurk was born in Lavey and attended school at St Columb's College in Derry. He qualified from Queen's University Belfast as a civil engineer. He worked for the Road Service for a number of years before joining Derry City Council and being appointed City Engineer in 1992. McGurk worked as Deputy Town Clerk for three years before being appointed Town Clerk and Chief Executive in 2003.

His brother Johnny also played for Derry and part of the 1993 All-Ireland Championship winning side, winning an All-Star for his performances. Brother, Hugh Martin captained Derry in the 1980s.

== Honours ==
=== County ===
- Ulster Senior Football Championship - Winner (3): 1970, 1975, 1976
- Ulster Senior Football Championship - Runner up: 1971, 1977
- All-Ireland Under-21 Football Championship - Winner (1): 1968
- Ulster Under-21 Football Championship - Winner (1/2?): 1967?, 1968

==== Club ====
- All-Ireland Senior Club Football Championship - Winner (1): 1991
- Ulster Senior Club Football Championship - Winner (1/2?): 1990, 1992?
- Derry Senior Football Championship - Winner (3/4/5?): 1977, 1988, 1990, 1992? 1993?
- Derry Senior Football Championship - Runner up: 1971, 1980
- Underage awards

=== Individual ===
- All Star - Winner (2): 1973, 1975
