= Johnny McGurk =

Dual player of Gaelic games and Derry Gaelic footballer

Personal information
- Born: 3 November 1965 (age 60) County Londonderry, Northern Ireland
- Occupation: Bid Manager
- Height: 5 ft 7 in (170 cm)

Sport
- Sport: Gaelic football
- Position: Half back
Club
| Years | Club | Apps (scores) |
| ?–? | Lavey | ? |
Club titles
- Derry titles: 4
- Ulster titles: 2
- All-Ireland Titles: 1
Inter-county
| Years | County | Apps (scores) |
| ?–? | Derry | ? |
Inter-county titles
- Ulster titles: 2
- All-Irelands: 1
- NFL: 3?
- All Stars: 1

John McGurk (born 3 November 1965) is a former dual player of Gaelic games who played Gaelic football at senior level for the Derry county team in the 1980s and 1990s. He was part of Derry's 1993 All-Ireland Senior Football Championship winning side and also won two Ulster Championships with the side. For his performances in the 1993 Championship he won an All Stars Award.

McGurk also won the All-Ireland Senior Club Football Championship in 1991 with his club Lavey, where he was captain. He was one of very few players in Ireland to complete this unique double and almost did the extreme rarity of winning both competitions in the same year in 1993, but Lavey were defeated in the All-Ireland club after winning their second Ulster Senior Club Football Championship.

McGurk played most of football career in defence, but did play in attack for Lavey sometimes.

== Personal life ==
McGurk was born in Lavey, County Londonderry, and attended school at St Patrick's College, Maghera. All seven of his brothers were keen sportsmen. Anthony McGurk won All Star awards in 1973 and 1975, Collie was also in the 1993 panel and Hugh Martin captained Derry in the 1980s.

He has three sons, James, Patrick and Marc and a daughter, Fíadh, with his girlfriend Helen, who won an All-Ireland intermediate club camogie championship with Lavey.

In April 2016, McGurk pleaded guilty to the theft of £572,206 from a construction company between 2006 and 2011. He was sentenced to ten months imprisonment in May 2016, of which he served 5 and a half.

== Inter-county career ==
McGurk won an Ulster Minor Championship and All-Ireland Minor Championship with Derry in 1983.

He made his Derry senior debut in 1988 as a 19-year-old against Antrim in the National Football League. He was part of Derry's 1993 Ulster Championship and All-Ireland winning team, which beat Cork in the final. McGurk added a second Ulster Championship medal in 1998.

He won National Football League medals with Derry in 1992, 1995 and 1996.

=== Hurling ===
Among McGurk's hurling honours was winning the Ulster Under 21 Hurling Championship with Derry in 1986, defeating Antrim and Down along the way. He scored 1-01 against Antrim in the semi-final at Loughguile in a 2-20 to 1-06 victory. They beat Down in the final after a reply; 3-09 to 1-02. McGurk's brother Collie was also part of the panel.

== Club career ==
He made his club debut when 15 years old and won a large array of medals with Lavey. He won four Derry Senior Football Championships and two Ulster Senior Club Football Championship. The highlight of his club career was captaining Lavey to victory in the 1991 All-Ireland Senior Club Football Championship. He said "My greatest memory is of lifting the Cup and seeing the whole parish of Lavey down below me in Croke Park". He also won the Derry Senior Hurling Championship on a number of occasions.
