= 2021–22 All-Ireland Senior Club Football Championship =

Gaelic football competition

- Dates: 21 November 2021 – 12 February 2022
- Teams: 32
- Sponsor: Allied Irish Bank
- Champions: Kilcoo (1st title); Aidan Branagan (captain); Conor Laverty (captain); Mickey Moran (manager)
- Runners-up: Kilmacud Crokes; Shane Cunningham (captain); Robbie Brennan (manager)

Tournament statistics
- Matches played: 31
- Goals scored: 62 (2 per match)
- Points scored: 652 (21.03 per match)
- Top scorer(s): Eamonn Callaghan (0–21) (Naas)

The 2021–22 All-Ireland Senior Club Football Championship was the 51st staging of the All-Ireland Senior Club Football Championship, the Gaelic Athletic Association's premier inter-county club football tournament. It was the first club championship to be held for two years as the 2020–21 edition was cancelled due to the impact of the COVID-19 pandemic on Gaelic games. The competition began on 21 November 2021 and ended on 12 February 2022.

The defending champion was Corofin. However, the club lost the Galway SFC final; therefore it could not defend the title.

Kilcoo defeated Kilmacud Croked by 2–8 to 0–13 after extra time in the final at Croke Park on 12 February 2022 to win the competition.

== Format ==
County Championships

All thirty-two counties in Ireland and London play their county senior championships between their top gaelic football clubs. Each county decides the format for their county championship. The format can be straight knockout, double-elimination, a league, groups, etc. or a combination.

Only single club teams are allowed to enter the All-Ireland Club championship. If a team that is an amalgamation of two or more clubs, a divisional team or a university team wins a county's championship, a single club team will represent that county in the provincial championship as determined by that county's championship rules. Normally it is the club team that exited the championship at the highest stage.

Provincial championships

Connacht, Leinster, Munster and Ulster each organise a provincial championship for their participating county champions. The Kilkenny senior champions play in the Leinster Intermediate Club Football Championship. London continue to compete in the Connacht championship – in previous years they played one of the provincial champions in a single match in December referred to as a quarter-final.

All matches are knock-out. Two ten minute periods of extra time are played each way if it's a draw at the end of normal time in all matches including the final. If the score is still level after extra time the match is replayed.

All-Ireland

In a bid to shorten the break between the provincial finals and the All-Ireland semi-finals, the two semi-finals between the four provincial champions were played in late January – previously they were held in mid-February. Traditionally, the All-Ireland Club SFC final was played in Croke Park on 17 March (St Patrick's Day), but it was also moved to mid-February in 2022.

== County Finals ==
=== Connacht ===
Galway SFC

14 November 2021 Final	Mountbellew–Moylough	1-12 (15) – (9) 0-09	Corofin	Salthill
13:30 GMT (UTC+0)				Venue: Pearse Stadium
		Report		Referee: Thomas Murphy (Annaghdown)

Leitrim SFC

17 October 2021 Final	Ballinamore	1-16 (19) – (17) 0-17	Mohill	Carrick-on-Shannon
				Venue: Páirc Seán Mac Diarmada
		Report		Referee: Gareth Foley (Melvin Gaels)

London SFC

18 October 2021 Final	St Kiernan's	1-13 (16) – (12) 0-12	Fulham Irish	Ruislip
				Venue: McGovern Park
		Report		Referee: Gavin Dixon

Mayo SFC

21 November 2021 Final	Knockmore	1-09 (12) – (6) 0-06	Belmullet	Ballina
13:30 GMT (UTC+0)				Venue: James Stephens Park, Ballina
		Report		Referee: J Henry (Castlebar Mitchels)

Roscommon SFC

31 October 2021 Final	Pádraig Pearses	2-08 (14) – (11) 0-11	Clann na nGael	Roscommon
				Venue: Dr Hyde Park
		Report		Referee: Patrick McTiernan

Sligo SFC

24 October 2021 Final	Tourlestrane	2-12 (18) – (7) 0-07	Coolera/Strandhill	Sligo
				Venue: Markievicz Park
		Report		Referee: Ronan Hynes

=== Leinster ===
Carlow SFC

14 November 2021 Final	Rathvilly	2-12 (18) – (13) 1-10	Éire Óg, Carlow	Carlow
15:00 GMT (UTC+0)				Venue: Dr Cullen Park
		Report		Referee: Paud O'Dwyer (Palatine)

Dublin SFC

21 November 2021 Final	Kilmacud Crokes	1-07 (10) – (9) 1-06	St Jude's	Dublin
15:15 GMT (UTC+0)				Venue: Parnell Park
		Report		Referee: Dave Feeney (Parnell's)

Kildare SFC

7 November 2021 Final	Naas	0-14 (14) – (12) 0-12	Sarsfields	Newbridge
				Venue: St Conleth's Park
		Report		Referee: Billy O'Connell

Kilkenny SFC

The Kilkenny SFC champions take part in the Leinster Club Intermediate Football Championship.

28 November 2021 Final	Thomastown	2-06 (12) – (8) 1-05	Mullinavat	Kilkenny
13:30 GMT (UTC+0)				Venue: Nowlan Park
		Report		Referee: David Hughes

Laois SFC

14 November 2021 Final	Portarlington	4-09 (21) – (6) 0-06	Portlaoise	Portlaoise
16:00 GMT (UTC+0)				Venue: O'Moore Park
		Report		Referee: Brendan Hickey

Longford SFC

7 November 2021 Final	Mullinalaghta St Columba's	0-15 (15) – (6) 0-06	Mostrim	Longford
				Venue: Pearse Park
		Report		Referee: P Maguire (St Mary’s Granard)

Louth SFC

7 November 2021 Final	Naomh Máirtín	1-15 (18) – (7) 0-07	St Mochta's
		Report		Referee: Derek Ryan (Sean O'Mahony's)

Meath SFC

7 November 2021 Final	Wolfe Tones	1-09 (12) – (9) 0-09	St Peters Dunboyne	Navan
				Venue: Páirc Tailteann
		Report		Referee: Patrick Coyle (Curraha)

Offaly SFC

31 October 2021 Final	Tullamore	1-08 (11) – (11) 1-08	Rhode	Tullamore
				Venue: O'Connor Park
		Report		Referee: Marius Stones (Clara)

14 November 2021 Final replay	Tullamore	0-09 (9) – (7) 1-04	Rhode	Tullamore
14:00 GMT (UTC+0)				Venue: O'Connor Park
		Report		Referee: F Pierce

Westmeath SFC

14 November 2021 Final	St Loman's	0-13 (13) – (13) 0-13	Garrycastle	Mullingar
14:30 GMT (UTC+0)				Venue: Cusack Park
		Report		Referee: D Maher (Ballynacargy)

21 November 2021 Final replay	St Loman's	1-16 (19) – (15) 1-12 (a.e.t.)	Garrycastle	Mullingar
13:30 GMT (UTC+0)				Venue: Cusack Park
		Report		Referee: D Nugent (Maryland)

Wexford SFC

14 November 2021 Final	Shelmaliers	2-11 (17) – (10) 0-10	Gusserane O'Rahilly's	Wexford
14:15 GMT (UTC+0)				Venue: Wexford Park
		Report

Wicklow SFC

8 November 2021 Final	Blessington	0-11 (11) – (10) 0-10	Baltinglass
		Report		Referee: Darragh Byrne (Ballymanus)

=== Munster ===
Clare SFC

7 November 2021 Final	Éire Óg, Ennis	1-11 (14) – (9) 0-09	Kilmurry Ibrickane	Ennis
				Venue: Cusack Park
		Report		Referee: Jim Hickey (Cratloe)

Cork SFC

28 November 2021 Final	St Finbarr's	0-14 (14) – (13) 0-13	Clonakilty	Cork
15:00 GMT (UTC+0)				Venue: Páirc Uí Chaoimh
		Report

Kerry SFC

5 December 2021 Final	Austin Stacks	0-13 (13) – (10) 0-10	Kerins O'Rahilly's	Tralee
15:00 GMT (UTC+0)				Venue: Austin Stack Park
		Report		Referee: Jonathan Griffin (Glenbeigh/Glencar)

Limerick SFC

29 October 2021 Final	Newcastle West	1-08 (11) – (5) 0-05	Adare	Limerick
				Venue: Gaelic Grounds
		Report		Referee: Jonathon Hayes (St Senan’s)

Tipperary SFC

21 November 2021 Final	Loughmore-Castleiney	1-12 (15) – (14) 1-11	Clonmel Commercials	Thurles
				Venue: Semple Stadium
		Report		Referee: D O Mahoney

Waterford SFC

21 November 2021 Final	The Nire	1-07 (10) – (9) 0-09	Rathgormack	Dungarvan
14:00 GMT (UTC+0)				Venue: Fraher Field
		Report		Referee: Paddy Smith (Shamrocks)

=== Ulster ===
Antrim SFC

14 November 2021 Final	Kickhams GAC Creggan	1-12 (15) – (7) 0-07	St Mary’s Aghagallon	Belfast
14:30 GMT (UTC+0)				Venue: Corrigan Park
		Report		Referee: Colm McDonald (St Gall's)

Armagh SFC

14 November 2021 Final	Clann Éireann	2-12 (18) – (16) 0-16	Crossmaglen Rangers
15:00 GMT (UTC+0)
		Report		Referee: Ollie Hearty (Belleek)

Cavan SFC

7 November 2021 Final	Ramor United	0-10 (10) – (10) 0-10	Gowna	Cavan
				Venue: Breffni Park
		Report		Referee: Pat Clarke

14 November 2021 Final replay	Ramor United	1-15 (18) – (14) 0-14	Gowna	Cavan
14:30 GMT (UTC+0)				Venue: Breffni Park
		Report		Referee: Maggie Farrelly

Donegal SFC

7 November 2021 Final	St Eunan's	1-11 (14) – (4) 0-04	Naomh Conaill	Ballybofey
		Report		Referee: Enda McFeely (St Mary's, Convoy)

Derry SFC

7 November 2021 Final	Watty Graham's GAC Glen	1-13 (16) – (7) 0-07	Slaughtneil	Derry
				Venue: Celtic Park
		Report		Referee: Sean Curran (Faughanvale); Attendance: 7,435

Down SFC

7 November 2021 Final	Kilcoo	1-12 (15) – (13) 0-13	Burren	Newry
				Venue: Páirc Esler
		Report		Referee: Brendan Rice (Warrenpoint)

Fermanagh SFC

21 November 2021 Final	Derrygonnelly Harps	2-08 (14) – (5) 0-05	Enniskillen Gaels	Enniskillen
15:30 GMT (UTC+0)				Venue: Brewster Park
		Report		Referee: Barry Monaghan

Monaghan SFC

7 November 2021 Final	Scotstown	1-13 (16) – (10) 0-10	Truagh	Clones
		Report		Referee: Jason McAndrew (Ballybay)

Tyrone SFC

14 November 2021 Final	Dromore	0-15 (15) – (8) 0-08	Coalisland	Omagh
				Venue: Healy Park
		Report		Referee: K Enneatta (Omagh)

== Provincial championships ==
=== Connacht ===
Quarter-Finals
Tourlestrane (Sligo)	0-09
St Kiernan's (London)	0-04
Ballinamore (Leitrim)	2-08
Mountbellew–Moylough (Galway)	0-16

Semi-Finals
Knockmore (Mayo)	0-10
Tourlestrane (Sligo)	0-08
Mountbellew–Moylough (Galway)	1-07
Pádraig Pearses (Roscommon)	1-08

Final
Knockmore (Mayo)	1-11
Pádraig Pearses (Roscommon)	1-13

==== Quarter-finals ====
21 November 2021 Quarter-Final A	Tourlestrane (Sligo)	0-09 (9) – (4) 0-04	St Kiernan's (London)	Sligo
12:30 GMT (UTC+0)				Venue: Markievicz Park
		Report		Referee: Paddy Neilan (Roscommon)

21 November 2021 Quarter-Final B	Mountbellew–Moylough (Galway)	0-16 (16) – (14) 2-08	Ballinamore (Leitrim)	Carrick-on-Shannon
13:30 GMT (UTC+0)				Venue: Páirc Seán Mac Diarmada
		Report		Referee: Barry Judge (Sligo)

==== Semi-finals ====
11 December 2021 Semi-Final 1	Pádraig Pearses (Roscommon)	1-08 (11) – (10) 1-07	Mountbellew–Moylough (Galway)	Roscommon
13:30 GMT (UTC+0)				Venue: Dr Hyde Park
		Report		Referee: Jerome Henry

5 December 2021 Semi-Final 2	Knockmore (Mayo)	0-10 (10) – (8) 0-08	Tourlestrane (Sligo)	Ballina
13:30 GMT (UTC+0)				Venue: James Stephens Park
		Report		Referee: Thomas Murphy

==== Final ====
9 January 2022 Final	Pádraig Pearses (Roscommon)	1-13 (16) – (14) 1-11	Knockmore (Mayo)	Ballina
13:30 GMT (UTC+0)				Venue: James Stephens Park
		Report		Referee: James Molloy (Galway)

=== Leinster ===
Preliminary round
Naomh Máirtín (Louth)	2-16
Rathvilly (Carlow)	1-05
Blessington (Wicklow)	1-07
Mullinalaghta (Longford)	1-05
Naas (Kildare)	2-11
Tullamore (Offaly)	3-07

Quarter-Finals
Portarlington (Laois)	1-14
St Loman's (Westmeath)	1-12
Wolfe Tones (Meath)	1-09
Kilmacud Crokes (Dublin)	1-13
Shelmaliers (Wexford)	2-06
Naomh Máirtín (Louth)	1-07
Blessington (Wicklow)	1-07
Naas (Kildare)	4-11

Semi-Finals
Portarlington (Laois)	0-12
Kilmacud Crokes (Dublin)	1-11
Shelmaliers (Wexford)	1-13
Naas (Kildare)	2-15

Final
Kilmacud Crokes (Dublin)	0-14
Naas (Kildare)	0-07

==== Preliminary round ====
21 November 2021 Preliminary Round A	Naomh Máirtín (Louth)	2-16 (22) – (8) 1-05	Rathvilly (Carlow)	Dunleer
13:00 GMT (UTC+0)				Venue: Dunleer GAA Grounds
		Report		Referee: Fergal Smyth (Offaly)

21 November 2021 Preliminary Round B	Blessington (Wicklow)	1-07 (10) – (8) 1-05	Mullinalaghta St Columba's (Longford)	Longford
13:00 GMT (UTC+0)				Venue: Pearse Park
		Report		Referee: S Mulhare (Laois)

21 November 2021 Preliminary Round C	Naas (Kildare)	2-11 (17) – (16) 3-07	Tullamore (Offaly)	Newbridge
13:00 GMT (UTC+0)
		Report		Referee: Berry Tiernan

==== Quarter-finals ====
5 December 2021 Quarter-Final A	Portarlington (Laois)	1-14 (17) – (15) 1-12	St Loman's (Westmeath)	Portlaoise
14:00 GMT (UTC+0)				Venue: O'Moore Park
		Report		Referee: Anthony Nolan

5 December 2021 Quarter-Final B	Kilmacud Crokes (Dublin)	1-13 (16) – (12) 1-09	Wolfe Tones (Meath)	Navan
13:30 GMT (UTC+0)				Venue: Páirc Tailteann
		Report		Referee: Patrick Maguire

5 December 2021 Quarter-Final C	Shelmaliers (Wexford)	2-06 (12) – (10) 1-07	Naomh Máirtín (Louth)	Haggardstown
13:00 GMT (UTC+0)
		Report		Referee: Cormac Reilly

5 December 2021 Quarter-Final D	Naas (Kildare)	4-11 (23) – (10) 1-07	Blessington (Wicklow)	Newbridge
13:00 GMT (UTC+0)				Venue: St Conleth's Park
		Report		Referee: David Hickey

==== Semi-finals ====
18 December 2021 Semi-Final A	Kilmacud Crokes (Dublin)	1-11 (14) – (12) 0-12	Portarlington (Laois)	Dublin
17:00 GMT (UTC+0)				Venue: Croke Park
		Report		Referee: J Hickey (Carlow)

18 December 2021 Semi-Final B	Naas (Kildare)	2-15 (21) – (16) 1-13 (a.e.t.)	Shelmaliers (Wexford)	Dublin
15:15 GMT (UTC+0)		(FT: 1-11 – 1-11)		Venue: Croke Park
		Report		Referee: Seamus Mulhare (Laois)

==== Final ====
8 January 2022 Final	Kilmacud Crokes (Dublin)	0-14 (14) – (7) 0-07	Naas (Kildare)	Dublin
17:00 GMT (UTC+0)				Venue: Croke Park
		Report		Referee: Patrick Maguire (Longford)

=== Munster ===
Quarter-Finals
Éire Óg, Ennis (Clare)	2-11
Loughmore-Castleiney (Tipperary)	0-12
Newcastle West (Limerick)	0-08
The Nire (Waterford)	0-06

Semi-Finals
St Finbarr's (Cork)	2-14
Éire Óg, Ennis (Clare)	0-12
Austin Stacks (Kerry)	1-15
Newcastle West (Limerick)	0-08

Final
St Finbarr's (Cork)	2-09
Austin Stacks (Kerry)	1-10

==== Quarter-finals ====
5 December 2021 Quarter-Final A	Éire Óg, Ennis (Clare)	2-11 (17) – (12) 0-12 (a.e.t.)	Loughmore-Castleiney (Tipperary)	Ennis
13:00 GMT (UTC+0)				Venue: Cusack Park
		Report		Referee: David Murnane (Cork)

4 December 2021 Quarter-Final B	Newcastle West (Limerick)	0-08 (8) – (6) 0-06	The Nire (Waterford)	Newcastle West
13:00 GMT (UTC+0)
		Report		Referee: Chris Maguire (Clare)

==== Semi-finals ====
19 December 2021 Semi-Final A	St Finbarr's (Cork)	2-14 (20) – (12) 0-12	Éire Óg, Ennis (Clare)	Cork
13:30 GMT (UTC+0)				Venue: Páirc Uí Rinn
		Report		Referee: B Griffin (Kerry)

19 December 2021 Semi-Final B	Austin Stacks (Kerry)	1-15 (18) – (8) 0-08	Newcastle West (Limerick)	Tralee
13:30 GMT (UTC+0)				Venue: Austin Stack Park
		Report		Referee: S Lonergan (Tipperary)

==== Final ====
16 January 2022 Final	St Finbarr's (Cork)	2-09 (15) – (13) 1-10	Austin Stacks (Kerry)	Thurles
13:45 GMT (UTC+0)				Venue: Semple Stadium
		Report		Referee: Chris Maguire (Clare)

=== Ulster ===
Preliminary round

Quarter-finals

Semi-finals

Final

Dromore (Tyrone)
0-13 (aet)

Derrygonnelly Harps (Fermanagh)
1-16 (aet)

Derrygonnelly Harps (Fermanagh)
3-11

Clann Éireann (Armagh)
1-11

Kickhams Creggan (Antrim)
0-17 (aet)

Clann Éireann (Armagh)
2-14 (aet)

Derrygonnelly Harps (Fermanagh)
0-3

Kilcoo (Down)
3-10

Ramor United (Cavan)
1-8

Kilcoo (Down)
3-13

Kilcoo (Down)
1-11 (aet)

St Eunan's (Donegal)
1-4

Glen (Derry)
0-11 (aet)

Glen (Derry)
0-8

Glen (Derry)
1-18

Scotstown (Monaghan)
0-12

==== Preliminary round ====
21 November 2021 Preliminary round	Watty Graham's GAC Glen (Derry)	0-08 (8) – (7) 1-04	St Eunan's (Donegal)	Letterkenny
		Report		Referee: Sean Hurson (Tyrone)

==== Quarter-finals ====
4 December 2021 Quarter-Final A	Derrygonnelly Harps (Fermanagh)	1-16 (19) – (13) 0-13 (a.e.t.)	Dromore (Tyrone)	Carrickmore
13:30 GMT (UTC+0)				Venue: Páirc Colmcille
		Report		Referee: Martin McNally

5 December 2021 Quarter-Final B	Clann Éireann (Armagh)	2-14 (20) – (17) 0-17 (a.e.t.)	Kickhams GAC Creggan (Antrim)	Belfast
13:30 GMT (UTC+0)				Venue: Corrigan Park
		Report		Referee: Paul Faloon (Down)

4 December 2021 Quarter-Final C	Kilcoo (Down)	3-13 (22) – (11) 1-08	Ramor United (Cavan)	Cavan
18:00 GMT (UTC+0)				Venue: Breffni Park
		Report		Referee: Niall Cullen (Fermanagh)

5 December 2021 Quarter-Final D	Watty Graham's GAC Glen (Derry)	1-18 (21) – (12) 0-12	Scotstown (Monaghan)	Derry
15:15 GMT (UTC+0)				Venue: Celtic Park
		Report		Referee: Joe McQuillan (Cavan)

==== Semi-finals ====
18 December 2021 Semi-Final	Derrygonnelly Harps (Fermanagh)	3-11 (20) – (14) 1-11	Clann Éireann (Armagh)	Cavan
18:30 GMT (UTC+0)				Venue: Breffni Park
		Report		Referee: Sean Laverty (Antrim)

19 December 2021 Semi-Final	Kilcoo (Down)	1-11 (14) – (11) 0-11 (a.e.t.)	Watty Graham's GAC Glen (Derry)	Armagh
16:00 GMT (UTC+0)		(FT: 0-08 – 0-08)		Venue: Athletic Grounds
		Report		Referee: Noel Mooney (Cavan)

==== Final ====
16 January 2022 Final	Kilcoo (Down)	3-10 (19) – (3) 0-03	Derrygonnelly Harps (Fermanagh)	Armagh
15:45 GMT (UTC+0)				Venue: Athletic Grounds
		Report		Referee: Martin McNally (Monaghan); TV: TG4

== Semi-finals ==
29 January 2022 Semi-Final	Kilmacud Crokes (Dublin)	1-11 (14) – (8) 0-08	Pádraig Pearses (Roscommon)	Cavan
17:00 GMT (UTC+0)		(HT: 1-03 (6) - (3) 0-03)		Venue: Breffni Park
		Report		Referee: Paul Faloon (Down); TV: TG4

29 January 2022 Semi-Final	Kilcoo (Down)	1-18 (21) – (16) 1-13 (a.e.t.)	St Finbarr's (Cork)	Portlaoise
15:00 GMT (UTC+0)		(HT: 1-03 (6) - (8) 1-05) (FT: 1-10 (13) – (13) 1-10)		Venue: O'Moore Park
		Report		Referee: Brendan Cawley (Kildare); TV: TG4

== Final ==
12 February 2022 Final	Kilcoo (Down)	2-08 (14) – (13) 0-13 (a.e.t.)	Kilmacud Crokes (Dublin)	Dublin
17:00 GMT (UTC+0)		(HT: 0-02 - 0-08) (FT: 1-07 (10) – (10) 0-10)		Venue: Croke Park
		Report		Referee: Sean Hurson (Tyrone); TV: TG4

== Statistics ==
=== Top scorers ===
Overall Top Scorers

Rank	Player	Club	Tally	Total
1	Eamonn Callaghan	Naas	0-21 (0-15f)	21
2	Darragh Kirwan	Naas	4-06	18
3	Danny Tallon	Watty Graham's GAC Glen	1-12 (0-09f)	15
4	Conall Jones	Derrygonnelly	1-11 (0-09f)	14
4	Barry McHugh	Mountbellew–Moylough	1-11 (0-9f)	14
4	Sam Mulroy	Naomh Máirtín	0-14 (0-11f)	14
7	Paul Carey	Padraig Pearses	1-09 (0-3f)	12
8	Jerome Johnston	Kilcoo	3-02	11
8	Luke Griffin	Naas	2-05	11
10	Conor Turbitt	Clann Éireann	0-10 (0-7f)	10

In a single game

Rank	Player	Club	Tally	Total	Opposition
1	Darragh Kirwan	Naas	2-04	10	Tullamore
2	Luke Griffin	Naas	2-03	9	Blessington
2	Steven Sherlock	St Finbarr's	0-09 (0-06f, 0-01m)	9	Éire Óg, Ennis
2	Barry McHugh	Mountbellew–Moylough	0-09 (0-08f)	9	Ballinamore
5	Jerome Johnston	Kilcoo	2-02	8	Ramor United
5	Conall Jones	Derrygonnelly	1-05 (0-04f)	8	Clann Éireann
5	Paul Carey	Padraig Pearses	0-08 (0-3f)	8	Knockmore
5	Darragh O'Brien	Austin Stacks	0-08 (0-05f)	8	Newcastle West
5	Sam Mulroy	Naomh Máirtín	0-08 (0-05f)	8	Rathvilly
10	Conor McCrickard	St Finbarr's	2-01	7	Éire Óg, Ennis
10	Sean McEvoy	Ramor United	1-04 (0-01f)	7	Kilcoo

== Broadcasting rights ==
TG4 continued to broadcast live and deferred club championship games. RTÉ also broadcast games from the AIB Club Championships on Saturdays.

== Awards ==
Team of the Year

1. Niall Kane
2. Sam Ryan
3. Ryan McEvoy
4. Dan O'Brien
5. Miceal Rooney
6. Rory O'Carroll
7. Darryl Branagan
8. Craig Dias
9. Niall Daly
10. Ceilum Dohert
11. Jerome Johnston
12. Eugene Branagan
13. Dara Mullin
14. Steven Sherlock
15. Paul Carey

Footballer of the Year

- Eugene Branagan (Club)

Also nominated: PLAYER NAME (Club) & PLAYER NAME (Club)
