= 2021 Derry Senior Football Championship =

Gaelic football competition

Tournament details
- County: Derry
- Year: 2021
- Trophy: John McLaughlin Cup
- Teams: 16
- Defending champions: Slaughtneil

Winners
- Champions: Glen (1st win)
- Manager: Malachy O'Rourke
- Captain: Conor Carville

Runners-up
- Runners-up: Slaughtneil
- Manager: Paul Bradley

Promotion/Relegation
- Promoted team(s): Steelstown
- Relegated team(s): Foreglen

Other
- Top Scorer: Shane McGuigan
- Website: derrygaa.ie

The 2021 Derry Senior Football Championship was the 98th edition of Derry GAA's premier gaelic football tournament for the top clubs. The sixteen teams who qualified for the 2021 senior championship (12 Division 1A teams and four Division 1B teams) are explained in the 'Competition Format' section below.

The 2020 Derry senior championship format was changed as a result of the COVID-19 pandemic. Teams competed in an initial group stage where each team played three games before playing at least one game in the first knockout stage. The 2021 Championship followed a similar format.

Relegation playoffs were introduced in 2021. Newbridge lost their relegation quarter final against Claudy by 0–13 to 0-12 and was initially relegated to Division 1B for 2022. Banagher won their relegation quarter final against Dungiven by 1–09 to 0-09 and were promoted to Division 1A for 2022. At the start of the 2022 season the leagues were restructured. Division 1A was expanded from twelve to sixteen teams and renamed the Derry Senior League. Banagher, Dungiven, Kilrea and Steelstown (the 2021 intermediate champions) were the four additional teams.

Glen beat the defending champions Slaughtneil by 1–13 to 0–07 at Celtic Park, Derry to win their first senior championship.

The winners received the John McLaughlin Cup.

== Competition format ==
Senior Championships

2020 Format

Initially the sixteen teams were drawn into four groups of four teams. Each team was guaranteed three group games and at least one knockout game. All sixteen teams qualified for the knock-out stages. In the first round draw the teams were seeded from the group stage with the group winners playing the teams who finished fourth and the group runner-ups playing the teams who finished third. The quarter final draw was open but subject to the restriction that repeat pairings should be avoided if possible. The semi final draw was open.

2021 Format

In the leagues, Division 1a and 1b teams played 11 league games and Division 2 teams played 13 league games. With the new condensed intercounty season coming into effect, club league games are played without county players until their involvement with the respective intercounty competitions comes to an end. The team that finished at the top of the league at the end of 11/13 games won their respective league.

Due to the move towards the split season model, which has been adopted by GAA nationally, 2021 will see club leagues decoupled from the Championship, with matters of promotion and relegation decided via the championship competitions. 2021 Championship groups are based on 2020 Championship placings. Each group will contain one semi-finalist, one beaten quarter-finalist and two beaten last 16 teams.

	Team
1	Semi-finalist
2	Beaten QF
3	Beaten Last 16
1	Beaten Last 16

Each team will be guaranteed three group games and at least one knockout game. The games will be played on a group basis (Home, Away & Neutral fixture). If any club cannot field the game will be forfeited. All sixteen teams qualify for the knock-out stages. In the first knockout round draw the teams were seeded from the group stage with the group winners playing the teams who finished fourth and the group runner-ups playing the teams who finished third. The quarter final draw was subject to the restriction that repeat pairings be avoided if possible.

The teams progress in this years championship will be used to determine their 2022 league placings. Once the groups games have been played and the last 16 knock out round is complete, the winning teams will continue to the quarter-finals and the losing teams will progress to therelegation quarter finals. The losers of the relegation final will also be relegated from the 2022 SFC at the expense of the 2021 IFC.

2022

Division 1A in 2022 will be made up of 8 SFC Quarter-final teams plus the 4 winners of the SFC Relegation Quarter-finals.

== Recent history of relegations and promotions ==
=== Relegations and promotions in 2021 ===
All promotions and relegations in 2021 were initially decided by performances in the 2021 senior championship and the relegation playoffs. Before the 2022 season began, Division 1A was renamed as the Derry Senior League and expanded from twelve to sixteen teams. This meant that some of the relegations from the 2021 Division 1A were reversed.

Senior Championship

- Foreglen conceded before the relegation semi final playoffs and were automatically relegated to the 2022 intermediate championship, thus making the relegation semi finals and final unnecessary.
- Steelstown beat Greenlough by 0-09 0–08 in the intermediate championship final. Steelstown replaced Foreglen in the 2022 senior championship.

Divisions 1A & 1B

- Banagher beat Dungiven by 1–09 to 0–09 in a relegation quarter final playoff. Banagher were promoted to Division 1A. Dungiven initially remained in Division 1B. In 2022, Division 1A was renamed as the Derry Senior League and expanded from twelve to sixteen teams. Dungiven were promoted to the expanded senior league.
- Claudy beat Newbridge by 0–13 to 0–12 in a relegation quarter final playoff. Claudy remained in Division 1A. Newbridge were initially relegated to Division 1B. In 2022, Division 1A was renamed as the Derry Senior League and expanded from twelve to sixteen teams. Newbridge were promoted to the expanded senior league.
- Kilrea initially remained in Division 1B. In 2022, Division 1A was renamed as the Derry Senior League and expanded from twelve to sixteen teams. Kilrea was promoted to the expanded senior league.
- Steelstown initially remained in Division 1B. In 2022, Division 1A was renamed as the Derry Senior League and expanded from twelve to sixteen teams. Steelstown were promoted to the expanded senior league because they won the 2021 Derry Intermediate Championship.

=== Relegations and promotions in 2020 ===
There were no promotions or relegations from the senior championship or leagues in 2020 due to the public health measures introduced to combat COVID-19.

=== Relegations and promotions in 2019 ===
Senior Championship

All twelve teams in the 2019 Division 1A automatically qualified for the 2020 senior championship. Four 2019 Division 1B teams also qualified for the 2020 senior football championship –

- Claudy finished 1st in 2019 Division 1B with 19 points.
- Newbridge finished 2nd in 2019 Division 1B with 17 points.
- Kilrea finished 3rd in 2019 Division 1B with 14 points.
- Foreglen won the intermediate championship, defeating Claudy by 0–15 to 0-09. Foreglen took the place in the 2020 ( and in 2021 due to Covid) senior championship reserved for the 2019 intermediate champions instead of Greenlough who finished 4th in 2019 Division 1B with 14 points.

League

Two teams were relegated from Division 1A and were replaced by two teams from Division 1B –

- Dungiven finished 11th in 2019 Division 1A with 3 points. They were relegated but retained the right to play in the 2020 senior football championship.
- Banagher finished 12th in 2019 Division 1A with 0 points. They were relegated but retained the right to play in the 2020 senior football championship.
- Claudy finished 1st in 2019 Division 1B with 19 points and were promoted.
- Newbridge finished 2nd in 2019 Division 1B with 17 points and were promoted.

== Senior Championship Group Stage ==
The draw for the group stage was held on Thursday 5 August 2021.

=== Group A ===
Pos	Team	Pld	W	D	L	PF	PA	PD	Pts
1	Loup	3	2	0	1	55	38	+17	4
2	Ballinascreen	3	2	0	1	46	30	+16	4
3	Dungiven	3	2	0	1	43	43	0	4
4	Foreglen	3	0	0	3	34	67	−33	0

Updated to match(es) played on unknown. Source:

2 September 2021 Round 1	Loup	2-07 – 0-10	Ballinascreen
8pm				Venue: Owenbeg
	Gls: Ciaran Devlin 2-0, 1pen Pts: Caolan Devlin 0-3, 1f; Ciaran Devlin 0-2, A O'Neill 0-2, 1f		Pts: JP Devlin 0-2; B Heron 0-2, 1f; N Rafferty 0-2, 0-1f; R Scullion 0-1 '45; R Murphy, C McAlinden, M Bradley All 0-1 each	Referee: M McAleese

5 September 2021 Round 1	Dungiven	2-15 – 2-05	Foreglen
5.30pm				Venue: Owenbeg
	Gls: R Mullan 2-0, 1-0pen Pts: C Higgins 0-5, 1f; C Murphy 0-4, 3f; B Dillon, C Kelly, D McKeever all 0-1 each		Gls: Cathair O'Connor 1-0; Caolan O'Connor 1-0; Pts: Cathair O'Connor 0-3, 1m;, K O'Connor 0-2f	Referee: B Cassidy

18 September 2021 Round 2	Dungiven	2-10 – 3-06	Loup
3.30pm				Venue: Dungiven
	Gls: C Kelly 1-0; J Mullan 1-0; Pts: M Burke 0-4, 2f; R Mullan 0-3, 1f; C Murphy 0-3f		Gls: A O'Neill 1-0; Ciaran Devlin 1-0p; R O'Kane 1-0; Pts: A O'Neill 0-3, 2f; Caolan Devlin 0-2; A McAlynn 0-1	Referee: Harry Tohill

19 September 2021 Round 2	Foreglen	0-11 – 1-16	Ballinascreen
3.30pm				Venue: Foreglen
	Pts: K O'Connor 0-6, 3f; Cathair O'Connor 0-2; M McCormick, L Downey, L O'Hara All 0-1 each		Gls: JP Devlin 1-0; Pts: JP Devlin 0-3, N Rafferty 0-4, 2f; B Heron 0-3, 1f; P Bradley 0-2; B Grant 0-2; M Bradley 0-1; R Scullion 0-1f	Referee: Sean Curran

25 September 2021 Round 3	Ballinascreen	2-11 – 0-06	Dungiven
3.30pm				Venue: Ballinascreen
	Gls: JP Devlin 1-0; B Heron 1-0; Pts: B Heron 0-2, 1f; C McWilliams 0-2; N Rafferty 0-1f; R Scullion 0-1f; JP Devlin, M Bradley, B Grant, C McGovern, R Doyle All 0-1 each		Gls: M Burke 0-3f; C Murphy 0-2, 1f; D McKeever 0-1	Referee: D Harkin

26 September 2021 Round 3	Loup	3-18 – 2-06	Foreglen
5pm				Venue: Loup
	Gls: A O'Neill 1-0; Ciaran Devlin 1-0; R O'Kane 1-0; Pts: Caolan Devlin 0-8, 4f; A O'Neill 0-5, 2f; R O'Kane 0-2; Ciaran Devlin, B Doyle, J Rocks All 0-1 each		Gls: K O'Connor 1-0; M McCormack 1-0p Pts: K O'Connor 0-3f; M McCormack 0-2; K Dunne 0-1	Referee: JJ Cleary

=== Group B ===
Pos	Team	Pld	W	D	L	PF	PA	PD	Pts
1	Newbridge	3	3	0	0	43	35	+8	6
2	Ballinderry	3	2	0	1	33	27	+6	4
3	Coleraine	3	1	0	2	45	43	+2	2
4	Banagher	3	0	0	3	40	56	−16	0

Updated to match(es) played on unknown. Source:

2 September 2021 Round 1	Ballinderry	1-05 – 1-09	Newbridge
8pm				Venue: Ballinderry
	Gls: D McGuckin 1-0p Pts: D McGuckin 0-2f; O Mullan 0-1m; C O'Neill 0-1f; S Coleman 0-1		Gls: P McGrogan 1-0; Pts: C McAteer 0-5, 3f; C Doherty 0-2; M Doherty, A McGlone, M McGrogan All 0-1 each	Referee: D O'Connor

3 September 2021 Round 1	Banagher	1-15 – 4-13	Coleraine
6.30pm				Venue: Banagher
	Gls: N Moore 1-0; Pts: T Moore 0-5, 2f; G O'Neill 0-3; C Feeney 0-2; M Lynch 0-2f; P Hagan, B Og McGilligan, N Moore All 0-1 each		Gls: L McMullan 2-0, N Holly 1-0, Ciaran McGoldrick 1-0; Pts: Ciaran McGoldrick 0-4; L McMullan 0-2; Colm McGoldrick 0-2f; Dara Mooney 0-2f; N Holly, R Mooney, A McGonigle, All 0-1 each	Referee: B Quinn

19 September 2021 Round 2	Ballinderry	2-08 – 0-08	Banagher
6.30pm				Venue: Owenbeg
	Gls: R Bell 2-0; Pts: R Bell 0-5, 1m, 1f; C O'Neill, O Mullan & D Bell All 0-1 each		Pts: P Hagan 0-4f, M Lynch 0-1f, T Moore, Gavin O'Neill, S Murphy All 0-1 each	Referee: Richie Donoghue

19 September 2021 Round 2	Newbridge	0-14 – 2-07	Coleraine
2pm				Venue: Owenbeg
	Pts: C Doherty 0-4, 1f; O McGlone 0-4; C McAteer 0-3, 1m; Peter McGrogan, Paudie McGrogan, S McGrogan all 0-1 each		Gls: Colm McGoldrick 1-0; Ciaran McGoldrick 1-0; Pts: D Mooney 0-3f; L McGoldrick 0-2; R Mooney & A McGonigle 0-1 each	Referee: G McWilliams

26 September 2021 Round 3	Coleraine	0-07 – 2-05	Ballinderry
3.30pm				Venue: Coleraine
	Pts: Ciaran McGoldrick 0-3, 1f; L McGoldrick 0-2, 1'45; D Mullan & B Daly 0-1 each		Gls: O Mullan 1-0; D Lawn 1-0; Pts: R Bell 0-3, 1f; D McGuckin & G McKinless 0-1 each	Referee: K O'Connor

26 September 2021 Round 3	Newbridge	2-11 – 1-11	Banagher
2pm				Venue: Newbridge
	Gls: J Diamond 1-0; Paudi McGrogan 1-0; Pts: C McAteer 0-3; M McGrogan 0-2; Peter McGrogan 0-2; Paudi McGrogan, Odhran McGlone, C Doherty, D McColgan All 0-1 each		Gls: M Lynch 1-0; Pts: M Lynch 0-10; P Hagan 0-1

=== Group C ===
Pos	Team	Pld	W	D	L	PF	PA	PD	Pts
1	Lavey	3	2	0	1	61	25	+36	4
2	Slaughtneil	3	2	0	1	52	23	+29	4
3	Swatragh	3	2	0	1	53	31	+22	4
4	Claudy	3	0	0	3	10	97	−87	0

Updated to match(es) played on unknown. Source:

3 September 2021 Round 1	Slaughtneil	2-18 – 0-03	Claudy
8pm				Venue: Slaughtneil
	Gls: S McGuigan 1-0, S Cassidy 1-0; Pts: S McGuigan 0-7, 4f; C Bradley 0-7, 4f; S Cassidy, S O'Caiside, C O'Doherty, B Cassidy All 0-1 each		Pts: O Armstrong, A Donaghy, C Johnston 0-1 each	Referee: Sean Curran

5 September 2021 Round 1	Lavey	0-10 – 1-08	Swatragh
2pm				Venue: Lavey
	Pts: E Downey 0-4, 3f; C Downey 0-3, 1f; M Downey 0-2; L Murphy 0-1		Gls: O McWilliams 1-0; Pts: J Kearney 0-4, 3f, 1 sideline; O McWilliams 0-2; F McGurk 0-1	Referee: JJ Cleary

18 September 2021 Round 2	Slaughtneil	0-10 – 2-07	Lavey
7.30pm				Venue: Owenbeg
	Pts: S McGuigan 0-8, 2f, 2 '45; C Bradley and S Cassidy 0-1 each		Gls: Cailean O'Boyle 1-0; S Downey 1-0; Pts: E Downey 0-2f; C Downey 0-1f; E McGill, N Toner, Cailean O'Boyle, K O'Neill all 0-1 each	Referee: Sean Curran

18 September 2021 Round 2	Swatragh	4-23 – 0-03	Claudy
2pm				Venue: Swatragh
	Gls: F Kearney 2-0; C McAtamney 1-0; C Murray 1-0; Pts: O McWilliams 0-10; F McGurk 0-3; F Kearney 0-2f; C McAtamney 0-2, 1p; L McWilliams 0-2; M Friel, SM Quinn, C Murray All 0-1 each		Pts: O Armstrong 0-3	Referee: Emmet McShane

24 September 2021 Round 3	Lavey	7-17 – 0-4	Claudy
7.30pm				Venue: Banagher
	Gls: C O'Boyle 3-0; L Murphy, N Toner, K O'Neill, A Toner All 1-0 each Pts: M Downey 0-5, 3f; E Downey 0-2, 1f; L Murphy 0-3, S Downey 0-4; N Toner, D Hughes, J McGurk All 0-1 each		Pts: O Armstrong 0-3, 1f; E McGahon 0-1	Referee: D O'Connor

25 September 2021 Round 3	Swatragh	1-04 – 2-12	Slaughtneil
5pm				Venue: Swatragh
	Gls: C Murray 1-0; Pts: J Kearney 0-1f; F Kearney 0-1f; F Quinn & F McGurk 0-1 each		Gls: Shane McGuigan 1-0; M McGrath 1-0; Pts: Shane McGuigan 0-6, 1f; C Bradley 0-4, 1f; B Rogers & Se McGuigan 0-1 each	Referee: B Cassidy

=== Group D ===
Pos	Team	Pld	W	D	L	PF	PA	PD	Pts
1	Glen	3	3	0	0	55	29	+26	6
2	Magherafelt	3	2	0	1	31	38	−7	4
3	Kilrea	3	1	0	2	50	60	−10	2
4	Bellaghy	3	0	0	3	42	51	−9	0

Updated to match(es) played on unknown. Source:

5 September 2021 Round 1	Glen	0-13 – 0-08	Bellaghy
12.30pm				Venue: Glen
	Pts: P Gunnng 0-4, 2f; E Doherty 0-3; D Tallon 0-3, 2f, 1m; C McFaul, C Convery, S O'Hara All 0-1 each		Pts: D Gallagher 0-3, 2f; C Diamond 0-2f; R McElwee 0-1f; Paul Cassidy & L Brady 0-1 each	Referee: D Harkin

5 September 2021 Round 1	Magherafelt	0-13 – 0-9	Kilrea
4pm				Venue: Lavey
	Pts: S Heavron 0-4; C Kearns 0-3; C Murphy 0-3; D Heavron, E McGuckin, N Higgins All 0-1 each		Pts: J Kielt 0-6, 3f; N Johnston 0-1f; R Maguire & PJ McAleese 0-1 each	Referee: D Mullan

19 September 2021 Round 2	Kilrea	3-08 – 1-21	Glen
6.30pm				Venue: Kilrea
	Gls: J Kielt 3-0, 1-0p Pts: J Kielt 0-2, 1f; PJ McAleese 0-1f; L Kielt 0-1m; R Maguire, P Quigg, P McLaughlin & K Quinn 0-1 each		Gls: D Tallon 1-0; Pts: P Gunning 0-9, 3f, 1m; C Convery 0-3; D Tallon 0-2; C McFau S O'Hara 0-1sl; C McGuckin, J Doherty, C Glass, & E Mulholland All 0-1 each	Referee: B Quinn

18 September 2021 Round 2	Bellaghy	0-11 – 1-11	Magherafelt
5pm				Venue: Bellaghy
	Pts: D Gallagher 0-2, 1f; E Brown 0-2, 1m 1p; C Diamond 0-2; J Diamond 0-2; P Stuart 0-1f; P Cassidy & K Friel 0-1 each		Gls: C Murphy 1-0; Pts: S Heavron 0-4, 3f; C Murphy 0-2; J Monaghan 0-2; N Higgins 0-1f; C Kearns & J Young 0-1 each	Referee: M McErlane

25 September 2021 Round 3	Glen	1-15 – 0-04	Magherafelt
7.30pm				Venue: Owenbeg
	Gls: M Warnock 1-0; Pts: J Doherty 0-3; D Tallon 0-3f; P Gunning 0-2, 1f; E Doherty 0-2; E Bradley 0-2; C McFaul 0-1m; C McGuckin & M Dixon 0-1 each		Pts: N Higgins 0-2, 1f; P McLarnon & C McErlain 0-1 each	Referee: D Mullan

26 September 2021 Round 3	Bellaghy	1-20 – 2-18	Kilrea
5pm				Venue: Owenbeg
	Gls: D Cassidy 1-0; Pts: D Cassidy 0-3; D Gallagher 0-4, 1f; C Diamond 0-5, 1f; E Brown 0-2; P Cassidy 0-2; P Stuart 0-2, 2 '45; R McElwee 0-1f; C McShane 0-1		Gls: R Maguire 2-0; Pts: J Kielt 0-7, 6f; N Johnston 0-4f; P Quigg 0-3; PJ McAleese, K Quinn, M Quinn, E McAleese All 0-1 each	Referee: R Donoghue

== Senior Championship Full Draw ==
First Knockout Round
Glen	2-22
Foreglen	0-08
Swatragh	1-12
Ballinascreen	2-02
Loup	4-18
Claudy	1-08
Newbridge	1-05
Bellaghy	0-09
Slaughtneil	1-15
Dungiven	1-04
Coleraine	2-14
Magherafelt	1-15
Lavey	1-17
Banagher	0-06
Ballinderry	2-24
Kilrea	1-17

Quarter-finals
Glen	2-18
Swatragh	0-07
Loup	3-12
Bellaghy	0-12
Slaughtneil	1-11
Coleraine	2-06
Lavey	2-08
Ballinderry	1-07

Semi-finals
Glen	3-19
Loup	0-05
Slaughtneil	1-13
Lavey	2-06

Final
Glen	1-13
Slaughtneil	0-07

== First Knockout Round ==
Group ranking was used to decide the draw – 1v4 and 2v3. The eight winning teams progress to the quarter-finals and are assigned to Division 1A for 2022. The eight losing teams enter the relegation playoffs with the four losing teams in the relegation quarter finals assigned to Division 1B for 2022.

The draw took place on 26 September 2021.

10 October 2021 Last 16	Glen	2-22 – 0-08	Foreglen	Banagher
2.15pm
	Gls: P Gunning 0-7, 2f; D Tallon 0-6, 4f, 1m; E Bradley 1-2, 1f; E Mulholland 1-0; E Doherty 0-2; C McFaul 0-2; C Convery, J Doherty, T Flanagan All 0-1 each		Gls: K O'Connor 0-5f; Caolan O'Connor 0-2; K Dunne 0-1	Referee: H Tohill

9 October 2021 Last 16	Lavey	1-17 – 0-06	Banagher	Glen
12.30pm
	Gls: E Downey 0-6, 2f; L Murphy 1-1; C Downey 0-3; N Toner 0-3; M Downey 0-1f; E McGill, K O'Neill, H McGurk All 0-1 each		Gls: P Hagan 0-2, 1f; T Moore, G O'Neill, M Lynch, C Lynch All 0-1 each	Referee: B Cassidy

12 October 2021 Last 16	Newbridge	1-05 – 0-09	Bellaghy	Owenbeg
8.00pm
	Gls: J Diamond (1-0); C McAteer (0-2f); D McColgan, M Doherty, C Doherty All 0-1 each		Gls: D Cassidy 0-2; P Stuart 0-2f; E Brown 0-1f; D Gallagher 0-1f; R McElwee, P Cassidy, C McShane All 0-1 each	Referee: B Quinn

10 October 2021 Last 16	The Loup	4-18 – 1-08	Claudy	Ballinascreen
2.15pm
	Gls: A O'Neill 1-7, 2f; Caolan Devlin 0-8, 5f; J Rocks 1-1; G Martin 1-0; A Canavan 1-0; R O'Kane, Ciaran Devlin 0-1 each		Gls: A Kerrigan 1-0p; E McGahon 0-3; O Armstrong 0-2f; A Donaghy, B Carlin, M Donaghy All 0-1 each	Referee: R Donoghue

10 October 2021 Last 16	Ballinderry	2-24 – 1-17 AET	Kilrea	Owenbeg
4.00pm
	Gls: R Bell 0-13, 7f, 1m; G McOscar 1-3; C O'Neill 1-2; D McGuckin 0-3; O Mullan, O Duffin, C Nevin All 0-1 each		Gls: N Johnston 0-5, 4f; PJ McAleese 0-4; R Maguire 1-1; P Quigg 0-3 1m; L Kielt, P McLaughlin, O McLarnon, R McCamphill All 0-1 each	Referee: S Curran

10 October 2021 Last 16	Slaughtneil	1-15 – 1-04	Dungiven	Owenbeg
5.45pm
	Gls: M McGrath 1-1; C Bradley 0-4, 1f, 1'45; S McGuigan 0-3, 1f, 1m; K Feeney 0-3; B Cassidy 0-2, 1m; C O'Doherty, P Cassidy 0-1 each		Gls: D McKeever 1-0; R Mullan 0-2f; C Kelly, C Higgins 0-1 each	Referee: M McErlane

9 October 2021 Last 16	Swatragh	1-12 – 2-02	Ballinascreen	Owenbeg
7.00pm
	Gls: F McGurk 1-1; SM Quinn 0-3; F Kearney 0-3; J Kearney 0-1f; O McWilliams, N Coyle, S Kearney 0-1 each		Gls: B Heron 1-0; C McWilliams 1-0; N Rafferty 0-2f	Referee: G Hegarty

10 October 2021 Last 16	Coleraine	2-14 – 1-15 AET	Magherafelt	Ballinascreen
12.30
	Gls: Colm McGoldrick 1-3, 1f; D Mooney 1-3, 1f; G McWilliams 0-4; R Mooney, A McGonigle, N Holly, L McGoldrick All 0-1 each		Gls: E McGuckin 1-2; C Murphy 0-3, 1f; N Higgin 0-2; S Heavron 0-2f; J Monaghan, R Ferris, D Higgins All 0-1 each	Referee: JJ Cleary

== Quarter-finals ==
Teams who played in the same group cannot be drawn against each other. The Quarter-final Draw took place on Sunday 10 October after the Slaughtneil/Dungiven match.

17 October 2021 Quarter-final	Swatragh	0-07 – 2-18	Glen	Owenbeg
6.45pm
	Gls: J Kearney 0-4f; F Kearney 0-2, 1f; O McWilliams & C McAtamney 0-1 each		Gls: P Gunning 1-1 0-1f; E Bradley 0-4, 2f; C McGuckin 1-0p; C Glass 0-2, 1'45; D Tallon 0-1f; E Doherty, C McFaul, C Convery J Doherty All 0-1 each	Referee: B Cassidy

16 October 2021 Quarter-final	Slaughtneil	1-11 – 2-06	Coleraine	Owenbeg
6.45pm
	Gls: C Bradley 0-7, 2f; P McNeill 1-0; Shane McGuigan 0-2, 1f; C O'Doherty & C McKaigue 0-1 each		Gls: G McWilliams 1-2; D Mooney 1-0; Ciaran McGoldrick 0-2; R Mooney 0-1	Referee: D O'Connor

16 October 2021 Quarter-final	Lavey	2-08 – 1-07	Ballinderry	Owenbeg
5pm
	Gls: D Hughes 1-1; M Downey 1-1, 0-1f; C Downey 0-2, 1f; E Downey 0-1sl; C O'Boyle 0-1f; Hugh McGurk & E McGill 0-1 each		Gls: A Mullan 1-0; R Bell 0-2m; G McOscar 0-2, 1m, 1f; C O'Neill, G McKinless, D Lawn All 0-1 each	Referee: G McWilliams

17 October 2021 Quarter-final	Loup	3-12 – 0-12	Bellaghy	Owenbeg
5pm
	Gls: R O'Kane 1-4; T O'Brien 1-0; P Coney 1-0; A O'Neill 0-3, 1f; Caolan Devlin 0-3; Ciaran Devlin 0-2		Gls: D Gallagher 0-4f; D Cassidy 0-3, 1f; D Brown 0-2; R McElwee 0-1f; E Brown & P Cassidy 0-1 each	Referee: G Hegarty

== Semi-finals ==
The semi final pairings were determined by an open draw without restrictions. The draw was made after the Glen v Swatragh match on Sunday 17 October.

Lavey versus Slaughtneil was a repeat pairing from Group C Round 2 on 18 September 2021 at Owenbeg - Lavey won that game by 2–07 to 0–10.

31 October 2021 Semi-final	Loup	0-05 – 3-19	Glen	Owenbeg
2.45pm
	Gls: A O'Neill 0-2, 1f; Ciaran Devlin 0-2; Caolin Devlin 0-1		Gls: J Doherty 1-2; D Tallon 1-1; C McGuckian 0-4, 1f; E Doherty 1-0; C Glass 0-2, E Bradley 0-2; E Mulholland 0-2; P Gunning 0-1f; S O'Hara, T Flanagan, C Mulholland, C Carville All 0-1 each	Referee: B Cassidy

30 October 2021 Semi-final	Lavey	2-06 – 1-13	Slaughtneil	Owenbeg
6.45pm
	Gls: M Downey 0-4f; H McGuck 1-0; E McGill 1-0; N Toner 0-1		Gls: Shane McGuigan 1-6, 1-0p, 0-3f; C Bradley 0-6, 0-3f, 0-1'45; F McGuigan 0-1	Referee: G Hegarty

== Final ==
7 November 2021 Final	Slaughtneil	0-07 – 1-13	Glen	Celtic Park
2:00 pm
	Gls: C Bradley 0-3, 2f; Shane McGuigan 0-1m; B Rodgers and P Cassidy 0-1 each		Gls: D Tallon 1-2, 0-2f; C McFaul 0-3; C Glass 0-3, 1f; E Bradley 0-2f; P Gunning 0-1f; C Carville & J Doherty 0-1 each	Referee: Sean Curran; Attendance: 7500

== Relegation playoffs ==
=== Relegation Quarter-finals ===
The eight losing teams from the first knockout round competed in the 2021 relegation quarter finals. Initially the four losing teams were planned to be assigned to Division 1B for 2022 and the remaining twelve senior championship teams were planned to be assigned to Division 1A for 2022. Subsequently, Derry GAA expanded the top division to sixteen teams for 2022 and renamed it the Senior League. Fifteen of the sixteen teams who competed in the 2021 senior championship were assigned to the new senior league for 2022. Foreglen were assigned to the intermediate league for 2022 and the 2021 intermediate champions, Steelstown, took their place in the new senior league.

The four teams with the highest number of points from the group stage were drawn against the four teams with the lowest points. Repeat fixtures from the group stage were not permitted. The relegation quarter final draw took place after the Newbridge/Bellaghy re-fixture on Tuesday 10 October 2021.

17 October 2021 Relegation QF	Magherafelt	2-15 – 0-06	Foreglen	Ballerin
2.45pm
				Referee: C Doherty

17 October 2021 Relegation QF	Dungiven	0-09 – 1-09	Banagher	Ballerin
1pm
				Referee: JJ Cleary

17 October 2021 Relegation QF	Newbridge	0-12 – 0-13	Claudy	Greenlough
1pm
				Referee: Harry Tohill

17 October 2021 Relegation QF	Ballinascreen	1-11 – 0-12	Kilrea	Greenlough
2.45pm
				Referee: K Connor

=== Relegation Semi-finals (cancelled) ===
The relegation semi finals would have been played between the losers of the relegation quarter finals. Foreglen conceded and were automatically relegated to the 2022 intermediate championship, thus making the relegation semi finals and final unnecessary.

=== Relegation Final (cancelled) ===
The relegation finals would have been played between the losers of the relegation semi finals. The losing team would have been relegated to the 2022 intermediate championship. Foreglen conceded and were automatically relegated to the 2022 intermediate championship, thus making the relegation semi finals and final unnecessary.

The 2021 intermediate champions, Steelstown, were promoted to the 2022 senior championship.

== Top Scorer ==
Main Championship only (Relegation playoff games not included)
Quarter-finals completed

Rank	Player	Club	Group Stage	First round	Quarter-final	Semi-final	Final	Total
1	Shane McGuigan	Slaughtneil	2-21 (27)	0-03	0-02	1-06	0-01	3-33 (42)
2	Christopher Bradley	Slaughtneil	0-12	0-04	0-07	0-06	0-03	0-32 (32)
3	Anthony O'Neill	Loup	2-10 (16)	1-07 (10)	0-03	0-02		3-22 (31)
4	Ryan Bell	Ballinderry	2-08 (14)	0-13	0-02			2-23 (29)
5	Paul Gunning	Glen	0-15	0-07	1-01	0-01	0-01	1-25 (28)
