= Sam Ryan (Gaelic footballer) =

Irish Gaelic footballer (born 1994)

Personal information
- Native name: Somhairle Ó Riain (Irish)
- Born: 1994 (age 31–32) Togher, Cork, Ireland
- Occupation: QC analyst

Sport
- Sport: Gaelic football
- Position: Right corner-back
Club
- Years: Club
- St Finbarr's
Club titles
- Cork titles: 1
College
- Years: College
- 2013-2017: University College Cork
College titles
- Sigerson titles: 0
Inter-county
Years	County	Apps (scores)
2018-present	Cork	0 (0-00)
Inter-county titles
- Munster titles: 0
- All-Irelands: 0
- NFL: 0
- All Stars: 0

Sam Ryan (born 1994) is an Irish Gaelic footballer who plays for Premier Senior Championship club St Finbarr's and at senior level for the Cork county team. He usually lines out as a right corner-back.

== Honours ==
St Finbarr's

- Cork Senior Football Championship (1): 2018

Cork

- National Football League Division 3 (1): 2020
