= List of Derry inter-county footballers =

Gaelic footballers who have played for Derry

This is a very incomplete list of Gaelic footballers who have played for Derry in the All-Ireland Senior Football Championship (SFC).

== List of players ==
Table headers

- Apps – Number of Championship games played

Positions key
GK	Goalkeeper	BK	Back	MF	Midfielder	FW	Forward

Name	Club	Position	Derry career	Apps	Score	Major inter-county honours
Damian Barton	Newbridge	FW	1981–199x	?	?	All-Ireland SFC, 2/3 x NFL, 2 x Ulster SFC, Ulster U-21 FC, Ulster MFC
Eoin Bradley	Glenullin	FW	2004–	?	?	NFL
Gabriel Bradley	Glenullin	BK/MF/FW	1975–1984	22	?	2 x Ulster SFC
Paddy Bradley	Glenullin	FW	1999–	?	?	2 x NFL, All Star
Barney McNicholl	Foreglen	FB	2x Under 21's Ulster Championship			
Patsy Bradley	Slaughtneil	MF	200x–	?	?	NFL, All-Ireland MFC, Ulster MFC
Francie Brolly	Dungiven	?	19xx–19xx	?	?	?
Joe Brolly	Dungiven	FW	1990–200x	?	?	All-Ireland SFC, 3/4 x NFL, 2 x Ulster SFC, 2 x All Star, more?
Paul Cartin	Banagher	BK	2000–	?	?	NFL
Damian Cassidy	Bellaghy	FW	1984–1996	?	?	All-Ireland SFC, 3 x NFL, 2 x Ulster SFC, 2 x Ulster U-21 FC, All-Ireland MFC, Ulster MFC
Joe Cassidy	Bellaghy	FW	1997–2001	?	?	NFL??, Ulster SFC, All-Ireland U-21 FC, Ulster U-21 FC, Ulster MFC
Eamonn Coleman	Ballymaguigan	FW	19xx–19xx	?	?	Ulster SFC, All-Ireland U-21 FC, 2 x Ulster U-21 FC, All-Ireland MFC, Ulster MFC
Barry Gillis	Magherafelt	GK	199x–	?	?	2 x NFL
Kevin McGuckin	Ballinderry	BK	2002–	?	?	NFL
Kevin McCloy	Lavey	BK	2001–	?	?	NFL
Gerard O'Kane	Glenullin	BK	2004–	?	?	NFL, All-Ireland MFC, Ulster MFC
Chrissy McKaigue	Slaughtneil	BK	2008–	5	?	-
Barry McGoldrick	Eoghan Rua	FW/BK	2006–	?	?	NFL, All-Ireland MFC, Ulster MFC
Sean Leo McGoldrick	Eoghan Rua	BK/FW	200x–	?	?	NFL
Fergal Doherty	Bellaghy	MF	2001–	?	?	NFL
Joe Diver	Bellaghy	MF	2006–	?	?	NFL, Ulster MFC
Barry McGuigan	Slaughtneil	BK/FW	2009–	?	?	?
Paul Murphy	Dungiven	FW	1998–	?	?	1/2 x NFL, more?
Enda Lynn	Greenlough	FW	2007–	?	?	NFL
James Kielt	Kilrea	FW	2009–	3	?	-
Mark Lynch	Banagher	FW	2004–	?	?	NFL, All-Ireland MFC, Ulster MFC
Paul Cartin	Banagher	BK	2001–			NFL
John Deighan	Limavady	GK	2008–	2	0-00	NFL
Dermot McBride	Ballinascreen	BK	2008–			-
Sean Marty Lockhart	Banagher	BK	1995–	50		3 x NFL, Ulster SFC, All-Ireland U-21 FC, Ulster U-21 FC, All Star
James Conway	Ballinderry	MF	200x–			NFL
Niall McCusker	Ballinderry	BK	1998/9–			2 x NFL
Enda Muldoon	Ballinderry	MF/FW	1997–			2 x NFL, Ulster SFC, All-Ireland U-21 FC, Ulster U-21 FC, Ulster MFC, All Star
Tom McGuinness	Various	MF	1968–1980	31	0-27	3 x Ulster SFC, All-Ireland U-21 FC, 1/2 x Ulster U-21 FC
Eamonn Burns	Ballinascreen	FW	1991–2002			All-Ireland SFC, 4 x NFL, 2 x Ulster SFC, Ulster U-21 FC, All-Ireland MFC, 2 x Ulster MFC
Geoffrey McGonagle	Dungiven	FW	1994–200x			2/3 x NFL, Ulster SFC, Ulster MFC, more?
Anthony Tohill	Swatragh	MF	1991–2003		4-121	All-Ireland SFC, 4 x NFL, 2 x Ulster SFC, All-Ireland MFC, Ulster MFC, 4 x All Star
Dermot McNicholl	Glenullin	FW	1983–199x			All-Ireland SFC, 3 x NFL, 2 x Ulster SFC, 3 x Ulster U-21 FC, All-Ireland MFC, 3 x Ulster MFC, All Star
Jim McKeever	Ballymaguigan*	MF	1948–1962/3/4			Ulster SFC, Texaco Footballer of the Year
John Eddie Mullan	Dungiven*	FW	194x–1955			NFL
Patsy Breen	Desertmartin	BK	1950–1960			Ulster SFC

== Additions ==
The following can be merged with the above.

Player	Debut	Last Game	Position	Club
Tommy Gribben	1945	1958	Midfield	Bellaghy
Jim McKeever	1948	1962	Midfield	Ballymaguigan
Sean O'Connell	1957	1977	Full forward	Ballerin
Larry Diamond	1963	1978	Midfield	Bellaghy
Eamonn Coleman	1968	1974	Forward	Ballymaguigan
Anthony McGurk	1970	1982	Back / forward	Lavey
Mickey Moran	1970	1982	Forward / back	Glen
Damian Cassidy	1983	1996	Left half forward	Bellaghy
Dermot McNicholl	1983	1996	Half forward	Glenullin
Tony Scullion	1983	1996	Full back	Ballinascreen
Enda Gormley	1985	2001	Left corner forward	Glen
Brian McGilligan	1986	1996	Midfield	Dungiven
Danny Quinn	1987	1996	Full back	Bellaghy
Henry Downey	1988	2001	Centre half back	Lavey
Kieran McKeever	1988	2002	Right corner back	Dungiven
Joe Brolly	1990	2000	Right corner forward	Dungiven
Anthony Tohill	1991	2003	Midfield	Swatragh
Seán Marty Lockhart	1995	2009	Corner back	Banagher
Enda Muldoon	1997	2011	Forward / midfield	Ballinderry
Paddy Bradley	1999	2012	Full forward	Glenullin
Fergal Doherty	2001	2015	Midfield	Bellaghy
Mark Lynch	2004	2018	Forward	Banagher

== See also ==
- Category:Derry inter-county Gaelic footballers
- Derry county football team#Current panel
