= 2009 Derry county football team season =

Derry
2009 season
- Chairman: Séamus McCloy
- Manager: Damian Cassidy
- National Football League: Runners-up
- Dr McKenna Cup: Group stage
- Ulster Championship: Semi-final
- All-Ireland Championship: Qualifiers Round 3
- Top goalscorer: Paddy Bradley (0–20)

The following is a summary of Derry county football team's 2009 season.

== Dr McKenna Cup ==
Derry were drawn in Section A of the 2009 Dr McKenna Cup along with Donegal, Femanagh and University of Ulster, Jordanstown (UUJ). New manager Damian Cassidy originally named a 27-man panel for the competition Dr McKenna Cup. It was a very experimental panel, including many newcomers, with only a handful of players having previous inter-county experience. A few other players were called into the panel later in the competition.

2009 Dr McKenna Cup panel
Shane McGuckin, Dermot McBride, Patsy Bradley, Mark Craig, Tony Walls, Eunan O'Kane, Michael McBride, Aidan McAlynn, Chrissy McKaigue, Paul Cartin, Michael Drum, Brian Óg McAlary, Joe Diver, Niall Bradley, PJ McCloskey, Gavin McShane, Michael O'Kane, Kevin O'Connor, Paul Young, Cathal McKeever, Brian Mullan, Enda Lynn, Paul Bradley, Coilin Devlin, Eoghan Brown, Seamus Bradley, Ciarán Mullan, Seán Marty Lockhart,^{[A]} Barry McGuigan,^{[A]} Paul Murphy,^{[A]} Cailean O'Boyle.^{[A]}

A. Not named on initial 27-man panel, but later called up.

=== Group games ===
4 January 2009; 2.00pm	Fermanagh	0–10 – 1–07	Derry	Brewster Park, Enniskillen; Attendance: 4,000; Referee: Brian Crowe (Cavan)
4 January 2009; 2.00pm	Pat Cadden 0-03 (0-01 free); Enda Ferris 0-03 (0-02 frees); Seamus Rider 0-02; Ryan Carson 0-01; Ciaran McElroy 0-01	Derry GAA report BBC report Belfast Telegraph report	Joe Diver 1-01; Paul Bradley 0-02 (0-01 free); Seamus Bradley 0-02 (0-01 free); Brian Mullan 0-02	Brewster Park, Enniskillen; Attendance: 4,000; Referee: Brian Crowe (Cavan)

11 January 2009; 2.00pm	Derry	0–10 – 0–13	University of Ulster, Jordanstown (UUJ)	Dean McGlinchey Park, Ballinascreen; Referee: R O'Donnell (Donegal)
11 January 2009; 2.00pm	Seamus Bradley 0-05 (0-03 frees); Eoghan Brown 0-01; Christopher McKaigue 0-01; Paul Bradley 0-01 (0-01 free); Joe Diver 0-01; Enda Lynn 0-01	Derry GAA report BBC report Belfast Telegraph report Irish Independent report RTÉ report	Ciaran Donnelly 0-08 (0-08 frees); Danny Mulholland 0-03; James Colgan 0-01; Colm Cavanagh 0-01	Dean McGlinchey Park, Ballinascreen; Referee: R O'Donnell (Donegal)

18 January 2009; 2.00pm	Derry	0–13 – 0–13	Donegal	O'Cahan Park, Dungiven; Referee: Gregory Walsh (Antrim)
18 January 2009; 2.00pm	Enda Lynn 0-03; Seamus Bradley 0-04 (0-01 free); Eoghan Brown 0-04 (0-02 frees); Gavin McShane 0-01; Paul Cartin 0-01	Derry GAA report BBC report Belfast Telegraph report	Stephen Griffin 0-05 (0-04 frees); Kevin McMenamin 0-03 (0-02 frees); David Walsh 0-03; Neil Gallagher 0-01; Brendan Boyle 0-01	O'Cahan Park, Dungiven; Referee: Gregory Walsh (Antrim)

=== Section A final standings ===
Pos	Team	Pld	W	D	L	F	A	SD	Pts
1	Donegal	3	2	1	0	47	34	13	5
2	Fermanagh	3	1	1	1	32	33	−1	3
3	Derry	3	0	2	1	33	36	−3	2
4	University of Ulster, Jordanstown (UUJ)	3	1	0	2	38	47	−9	2

Pos = Position; Pld = Matches played; W = Matches won; D = Matches drawn; L = Matches lost; F = Scores for; A = Goals against; SD = Score difference; Pts = Points.
2 points are awarded for a win, 1 point for a draw and 0 points for a lost. The three section winners plus best runner up went through to the semi-finals (shaded in green).

== National Football League ==
Derry announced a 34-man panel for the 2009 National League on 22 January 2009. Many of the more experienced players were re-called for the competition, along with some new players who impressed during the McKenna Cup.

2009 National League panel
John Deighan, Barry Gillis, Shane Mc Guckin, Eoin Bradley, Paddy Bradley, Patsy Bradley, Paul Bradley, Seamus Bradley, Eoghan Brown, Paul Cartin, James Conway, Coilin Devlin, Ryan Dillon, Joe Diver, Fergal Doherty, James Kielt, Seán Marty Lockhart, Mark Lynch, Enda Lynn, Brian Óg McAlary, Dermot McBride, Kevin McCloy, Niall McCusker, Barry McGoldrick, Sean Leo McGoldrick, Kevin McGuckin, Barry McGuigan, Chrissy McKaigue, Enda Muldoon, Brian Mullan, Paul Murphy, Gerard O'Kane, Joe O'Kane, Paul Young, Joe Keenan^{[A]}.

A. Not named on initial 34-man panel, but later called up.

Derry National League line-ups:

Opposition	Derry team	Ref
Mayo	S. McGuckin; B. Óg McAlary, B. McGuigan, R. Dillon; P. Cartin, J. O'Kane, C. McKaigue; F. Doherty, Patsy Bradley; E. Lynn, B. McGoldrick, S. L. McGoldrick; J. Kielt, E. Bradley, S. Bradley. Subs used: G. O'Kane for McGuigan (14 mins, yellow), J. Diver for Patsy Bradley (19 mins, yellow), P. Young for McAlary (37 mins, yellow), Paddy Bradley for S. Bradley (42 mins), B. Mullan for McGoldrick (52 mins), D. McBride for Dillon (63 mins, yellow).	
Westmeath	B. Gillis; B. Óg McAlary, S. M. Lockhart, G. O'Kane; P. Cartin, B. McGoldrick, C. McKaigue; F. Doherty (c.), J. Diver; E. Lynn, J. Kielt, B. Mullan; E. Brown, E. Bradley, Paul Bradley. Subs used: Paddy Bradley for Kielt (41 mins), Patsy Bradley for Diver (48 mins), S. L. McGoldrick for Lynn (55 mins), P. Young for Brown (57 mins). Blood sub: K. McGuckin for B. McGoldrick (61 mins, reversed 65 mins).	
Dublin	J. Deighan; K. McGuckin, N. McCusker, S. M. Lockhart; P. Cartin, B. McGoldrick, S. L. McGoldrick; F. Doherty (c.), E. Muldoon; E. Lynn, Paul Murphy, B. Mullan; Paddy Bradley, E. Bradley, Barry McGuigan. Subs used: Paul Bradley for Paddy Bradley (33mins), G. O'Kane for Cartin (half-time), J. Diver for Muldoon (45 mins), Patsy Bradley for Doherty (53 mins), E. Brown for Murphy (57 mins, yellow), R. Dillon for O'Kane (60 mins).	

=== Group games ===
1 February 2009; 2.30pm Round 1	Mayo	0–10 – 1–09	Derry	James Stephens Park, Ballina; Attendance: ≈2,500; Referee: Maurice Deegan (Laois)
1 February 2009; 2.30pm Round 1	Alan Dillon 0-03 (0-02 frees); Andy Moran 0-02 (0-01 '45); Conor Mortimer 0-02 (0-02 frees); Peadar Gardiner 0-01; Tom Parsons 0-01; Ronan McGarrity 0-01	RTÉ report BBC report	James Kielt 1-02; Barry McGoldrick 0-03 (0-02 frees); Paul Cartin 0-01; Fergal Doherty 0-01; Seamus Bradley 0-01; Paul Young 0-01	James Stephens Park, Ballina; Attendance: ≈2,500; Referee: Maurice Deegan (Laois)

15 February 2009 ?.??pm Round 2	Derry	1–18 – 0–07	Westmeath	Dean McGlinchey Park, Ballinascreen; Referee: Pat McEnaney (Monaghan)
15 February 2009 ?.??pm Round 2	Eoin Bradley 0-05; Paul Bradley 0-05 (0-03 frees); Enda Lynn 0-03; Eoghan Brown 1-00; Gerard O'Kane 0-02; Paul Cartin 0-01; Brian Mullan 0-01; Paddy Bradley 0-01	Derry GAA report RTÉ report BBC report	Denis Glennon 0-03; Dessie Dolan 0-03 (0-01 free); Thomas McDaniel 0-01	Dean McGlinchey Park, Ballinascreen; Referee: Pat McEnaney (Monaghan)

14 March 2009 ?.??pm Round ?	Dublin	1–12 – 0–20	Derry	Parnell Park, Dublin; Referee: John Bannon (Longford)
14 March 2009 ?.??pm Round ?	Bernard Brogan 0-04 (0-02 frees); Ger Brennan 1-00; Conal Keaney 0-03; Blaine Kelly 0-02; Alan Brogan 0-02; Diarmuid Connolly 0-01	Derry GAA report RTÉ report	Eoin Bradley 0-06 (0-02 frees, 0-02 sidelines); Paddy Bradley 0-04 (0-03 frees); Paul Murphy 0-03; Enda Muldoon 0-02 (0-01 free, 0-01 '45); Barry McGuigan 0-02; Barry McGoldrick 0-01; Sean Leo McGoldrick 0-01; Brian Mullan 0-01	Parnell Park, Dublin; Referee: John Bannon (Longford)

v

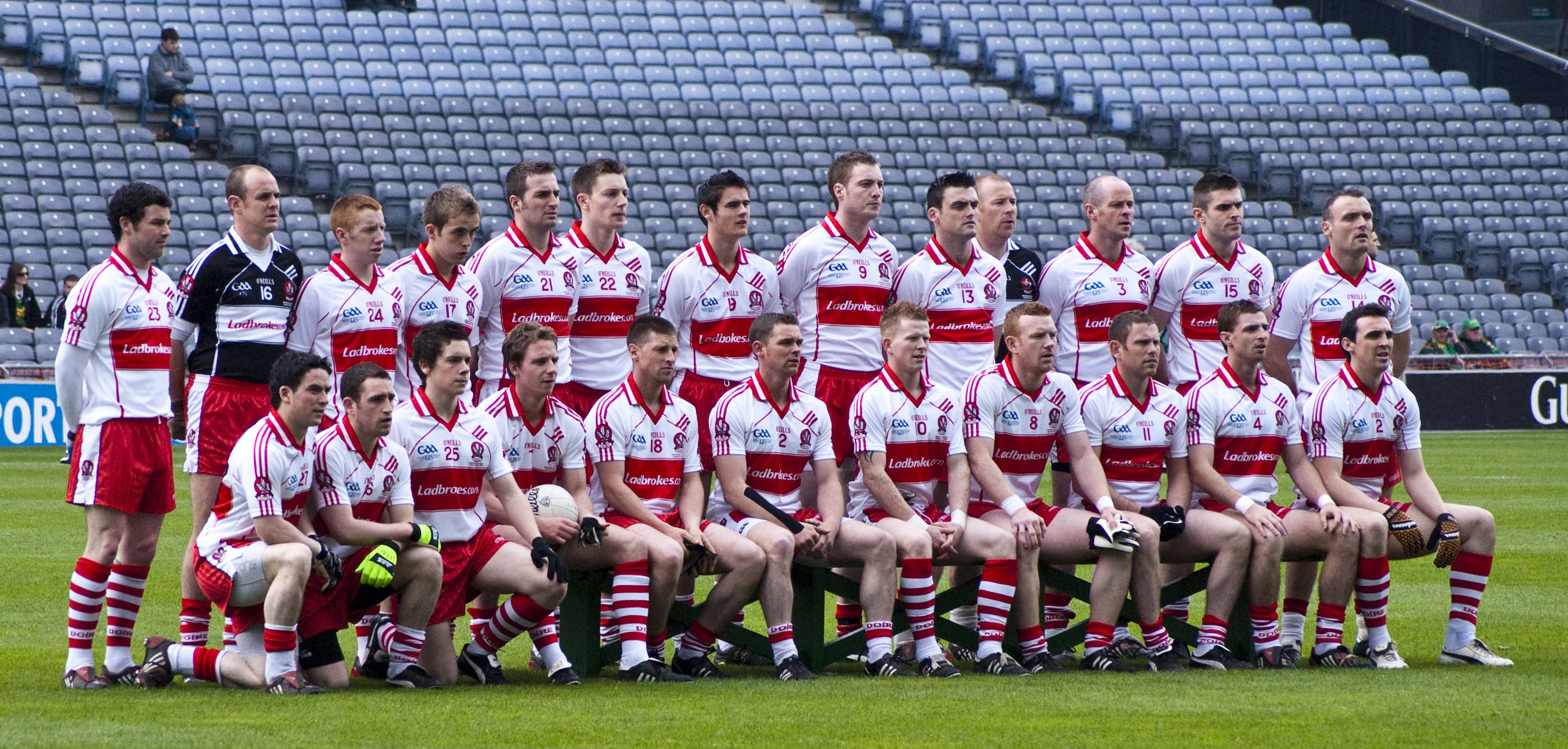
The Derry team ahead of the National League final

== Championship ==
In May 2009 manager Damian Cassidy announced a 35-man panel for 2009 Championship campaign. The Championship panel is much the same as that for the league, with a few additions and omissions.

2009 Championship panel
Shane McGuckin, Barry Gillis, John Deighan, Seán Marty Lockhart, Kevin McGuckin, Dermot McBride, Niall McCusker, Kevin McCloy, Carlos Mc Williams, Joe Keenan, Gerard O'Kane, Brian Óg McAlary, Chrissy McKaigue, Paul Cartin, Barry McGoldrick, Sean Leo McGoldrick, Patsy Bradley, Fergal Doherty, Joe Diver, James Conway, Enda Muldoon, Gavin McShane, Paul Murphy, Enda Lynn, Brian Mullan, Paul Young, Barry McGuigan, James Kielt, Cailean O'Boyle, Eoghan Brown, Eoin Bradley, Mark Lynch, Seamus Bradley, Paddy Bradley, Danny Mulholland, Ciarán Mullan^{[A]}, Joe Gray^{[A]}.

A. Not named on initial 35-man panel, but later called up.

Derry Championship line-ups:

Opposition	Derry team	Ref
Monaghan	B. Gillis; K. McGuckin, K. McCloy, G. O'Kane; C. McKaigue, B. McGoldrick, S. L. McGoldrick; F. Doherty (c.), J. Diver; B. McGuigan, P. Murphy, E. Lynn; E. Bradley, P. Bradley, J. Kielt. Subs used: M. Lynch for Murphy (40 mins), B. Mullan for Lynn (54 mins).	
Tyrone	B. Gillis; K. McGuckin, S. M. Lockhart, G. O'Kane; C. McKaigue, B. McGuigan, S. L. McGoldrick; B. McGoldrick, J. Diver; E. Brown, P. Murphy, E. Lynn; E. Bradley, P. Bradley (c.), M. Lynch. Subs used: S. Bradley for Murphy (23 mins), N. McCusker for S.L. McGoldrick (54 mins), C. O'Boyle for Lynch (56 mins), G. McShane for ?? (? mins).	
Monaghan		
Donegal		

=== Ulster Senior Football Championship ===
24 May 2009; 2.00pm Quarter-final	Derry	1–10 – 0–10	Monaghan	Celtic Park, Derry; Attendance: 10,378; Referee: Jimmy White (Donegal); Man of the Match: Gerard O'Kane
24 May 2009; 2.00pm Quarter-final	Paddy Bradley 1-03 (0-01 free); Eoin Bradley 0-02; James Kielt 0-02; Chrissy McKaigue 0-01; Barry McGoldrick 0-01; Joe Diver 0-01	BBC report RTÉ report	Paul Finlay 0-03 (0-03 frees); Tomás Freeman 0-03 (0-01 free); Raymond Ronaghan 0-02; Stephen Golloghy 0-01; Rory Woods 0-01	Celtic Park, Derry; Attendance: 10,378; Referee: Jimmy White (Donegal); Man of the Match: Gerard O'Kane

21 June 2009 ?.??pm Semi-final	Derry	0–15 – 0–07	Tyrone	Casement Park, Belfast; Attendance: 24,139; Referee: Gearóid Ó Conamha (Galway); Man of the Match: ?
21 June 2009 ?.??pm Semi-final	Eoin Bradley 0-04 (0-01 free, 0-01 '45); Barry McGoldrick 0-01 (0-01 free); Paddy Bradley 0-01 (0-01 free); Seamus Bradley 0-01	RTÉ report	Tommy McGuigan 0-04 (0-03 frees); Martin Penrose 0-03 (0-01 free); Kevin Hughes 0-02; Davey Harte 0-01; Stephen O'Neill 0-01; Seán Cavanagh 0-01; Brian Dooher 0-01; Brian McGuigan 0-01; Sean O'Neill 0-01	Casement Park, Belfast; Attendance: 24,139; Referee: Gearóid Ó Conamha (Galway); Man of the Match: ?

== Qualifiers ==
Monaghan	v

Donegal	v

== Minor & Under-21 ==
=== Under-21 ===
The Derry Under 21 team were managed by Senior manager Damian Cassidy in 2009, and his backroom team consisted of Enda Gormley, Barry Dillon, P. Mullan, Kevin O'Neill and Martin McConnell.

The Under-21s were drawn with Donegal in the quarter-final of the 2009 Ulster Under-21 Football Championship. Donegal emerged victorious to knock Derry out of the Championship on a scoreline of 0–12 to 0–06.

2009 Under 21 panel
Paul Dillon, Jarod Monaghan, Darren O'Neil, Sam Dodds, Cailean O'Boyle, Shane Barton, James Keilt, Paul McWilliams, Liam Morrow, Niall McNicholl, Thomas Mallon, Danny Mulholland, Gregory McGovern, Christopher Lagan, Niall Holly, Andrew Warnock, Stephen Cleary, Neil Forester, Declan Bell, Daniel Bateson, Aidan Heron, Anton McMullan, Chrissy McKaigue, Brendan Henry, John Francis Bradley, Dermot McBride, Aidy McLaughlin, Blaine Gormley, Ciaran McFeely, Oisin Duffy, James McNicholl.

18 March 2009; Quarter-final	Donegal	0–12 – 0–06	Derry
18 March 2009; Quarter-final		Derry GAA report
