= 2010 Derry county football team season =

Derry
2010 season
- Chairman: John Keenan
- Manager: Damian Cassidy
- National Football League: ?
- Dr McKenna Cup: ?
- Ulster Championship: ?
- All-Ireland Championship: ?

The following is a summary of Derry county football team's 2010 season.

== Dr McKenna Cup ==
Derry were drawn in Group C of the 2010 Dr McKenna Cup along with Down, Antrim and Queen's University Belfast (QUB). Manager Damian Cassidy in his second year in charge, named a 29-man panel for the competition. The panel included many newcomers.

2010 Dr McKenna Cup panel
John Deighan, Ciaran Mullan (Eoghan Rua), Gavin McLaughlin, Michael McGoldrick, Barry McGuigan, John O'Kane, Liam Hinphey, Niall McCusker, Gerard O'Kane, Charlie Kielt, Michael Bateson, Fergal Doherty, Patsy Bradley, Joe Diver, Martin Dunne, P.J. McCloskey, Andrew McCartney, Declan Mullan, Raymond Wilkinson, A. McLaughlin, Eoghan Brown, Stephen Cleary, Paddy Bradley, Eoin Bradley, Kevin O'Neill, Seamus Bradley, Brian Mullan, Gavin McShane, Mark Lynch.

Derry McKenna Cup line-ups:

Opposition	Derry team	Ref
Down		
Antrim		
QUB		

=== Section A final standings ===
Pos	Team	Pld	W	D	L	F	A	SD	Pts
1	Antrim	0	0	0	0	0	0	0	0
2	Derry	0	0	0	0	0	0	0	0
3	Down	0	0	0	0	0	0	0	0
4	Queen's University Belfast (QUB)	0	0	0	0	0	0	0	0

Pos = Position; Pld = Matches played; W = Matches won; D = Matches drawn; L = Matches lost; F = Scores for; A = Goals against; SD = Score difference; Pts = Points.
2 points are awarded for a win, 1 point for a draw and 0 points for a lost. The three group winners plus best runner up went through to the semi-finals (shaded in green).

== National Football League ==
Derry announced a 32-man panel for the 2010 National League in early February 2010. Seven newcomers to the league were included in the panel; Declan Mullan, Mark Craig, Charlie Kielt, Ciaran Mullan, Martin Dunne, Andrew McCartney and Michael Bateson. Barry Gillis, Sean Leo McGoldrick, Barry McGoldrick, Kevin McGuckin and Enda Lynn return after being rested for the McKenna Cup. Kevin McCloy is being rested ahead of the Championship, while Enda Muldoon and Coilin Devlin will miss the league through injury.

2010 National League panel
Barry Gillis, Martin Dunne, Brian Og McAlary, Mark Craig, Michael McGoldrick, Dermot McBride, Barry McGuigan, Liam Hinphey, Gerard O'Kane, Charlie Kielt, Kevin McGuckin, Barry McGoldrick, Ciaran Mullan, Sean Leo McGoldrick, Niall McCusker, Michael Bateson, Fergal Doherty, Patsy Bradley, Joe Diver, Andrew McCartney, Brian Mullan, Raymond Wilkinson, James Kielt, Mark Lynch, Enda Lynn, Declan Mullan, Eoin Bradley, Seamus Bradley, Cailean O'Boyle, Aidy McLaughlin, Eoghan Brown, Paddy Bradley.

Derry National League line-ups:

Opposition	Derry team	Ref

=== Group games ===
6 February 2010; 7.30pm Round 1	Derry	1–18 – 1–12	Tyrone	Celtic Park, Derry; Referee: Pat McEnaney (Monaghan)
6 February 2010; 7.30pm Round 1		Derry GAA report BBC report RTÉ report Hogan Stand report		Celtic Park, Derry; Referee: Pat McEnaney (Monaghan)

== Championship ==
2010 Championship panel

Derry Championship line-ups:

Opposition	Derry team	Ref

== Minor & Under 21 ==
=== Minor ===
2009 Minor panel

=== Under-21 ===
2009 Under-21 panel
