= 2007 Derry county football team season =

The following is a summary of Derry county football team's 2007 season. Details of the 2007 Derry club competitions are also shown.

== Dr McKenna Cup ==
Derry were drawn in Section B of the 2007 Dr McKenna Cup alongside Cavan, Tyrone and Queen's University Belfast. Manager Paddy Crozier used the competition as a chance to give inter-county experience to some young promising players, alongside more experienced players. Derry lost to Cavan and Tyrone, before defeating QUB in their final group game.

Derry McKenna Cup line-ups:

Opposition	Derry team	Ref
Cavan		
Tyrone		
QUB	B. Gillis; K. McIvor, K. McGuckin, J. Keenan; P. Cartin, L. Hinphey, P. O'Hea; J. Diver, R. Convery; R. McElhone, C. Gilligan, R. Wilkinson; S.L. McGoldrick, J. Kelly, Paul Bradley. Subs used: E. Lynn for McElhone (50 mins), F. Doherty for Diver (66 mins).	

=== Group games ===
7 January 2007	Derry	–	Cavan	Celtic Park (Derry)

14 January 2007; 2.00pm	Derry	–	Tyrone	Healy Park, Omagh

21 January 2007	Derry	1-10? – 0-10?	Queen's University Belfast (QUB)	Celtic Park (Derry); Referee: R. Doone (Antrim GAA)
21 January 2007	Conleith Gilligan 0-03 (0-01 free); Paul O'Hea 1-00; R. Wilkinson 0-02; Sean Leo McGoldrick 0-02; Ruairi Convery 0-01 more scorers?		Gerard O'Kane 0-02; Charlie Vernon 0-02; Justin Crozier 0-01; Kevin McGourty 0-01; Eoin McCartan 0-01; C. O'Reilly 0-01 more scorers?	Celtic Park (Derry); Referee: R. Doone (Antrim GAA)

=== Section B final standings ===
- Source: The Irish News

Pos	Team	Pld	W	D	L	F	A	SD	Pts
1	Tyrone	3	3	0	0	3-43	0-32	20	6
2	Cavan	3	2	0	1	1-40	1-37	3	4
3	Derry	3	1	0	2	1-31	1-42	-9	2
4	Queen's University Belfast (QUB)	3	0	0	3	1-30	4-37	-16	0

Pos = Position; Pld = Matches played; W = Matches won; D = Matches drawn; L = Matches lost; F = Scores for; A = Scores against; SD = Score difference; Pts = Points.
2 points are awarded for a win, 1 point for a draw and 0 points for a lost. The three section winners plus best runner up went through to the semi-finals (shaded in green).

== National Football League ==
Derry competed in Division 1B of the 2007 Allianz National Football League.

=== Group games ===
Date	Home team	Score	Away team	Score	Venue	Report
4 February 2007	Galway	0-07	Derry	0-12	Pearse Stadium, Galway	
11 February 2007	Derry	1-09	Westmeath	3-10	Celtic Park, Derry	
25 February 2007	Kildare	0-10	Derry	0-07	St. Conleth's Park, Newbridge, County Kildare	
11 March 2007	Armagh	1-08	Derry	1-13	St. Oliver Plunkett Park, Crossmaglen	
25 March 2007	Derry	1-11	Laois	1-11	Celtic Park, Derry	
1 April 2007	Down	0-09	Derry	0-12	St. Patrick's Park, Newcastle	
8 April 2007	Derry	3-18	Louth	1-12	Celtic Park, Derry	

== Championship ==
Derry Championship line-ups:

Opposition	Derry team	Ref
Antrim	B. Gillis; M. McGoldrick, K. McCloy, G. O'Kane; P. Cartin, S.M. Lockhart, C. McKeever; F. Doherty, J. Conway; B. McGoldrick, C. Gilligan, J. Diver; R. Wilkinson, E. Muldoon, M. Lynch. Subs used: Patsy Bradley for Cartin (30 mins), C. Devlin for B. McGoldrick (45 mins), Paddy Bradley for Diver (60 mins), L. Hinphey for O'Kane (68 mins).	

=== Ulster Senior Football Championship ===
10 June 2007; 3.30pm Ulster quarter-final	Antrim	0-10 – 1-13	Derry	Casement Park, Belfast; Attendance: 17,500; Referee: Cormac Reilly (Meath)
10 June 2007; 3.30pm Ulster quarter-final	CJ McGourty 0-04; Paddy Cunningham 0-04 (0-04 frees); Michael McCann 0-01 (0-01 free); Kevin Niblock 0-01	RTÉ report	Conleith Gilligan 0-05 (0-03 frees); Enda Muldoon 0-04; Mark Lynch 1-01; James Conway 0-01; Barry McGoldrick 0-01; Joe Diver 0-01	Casement Park, Belfast; Attendance: 17,500; Referee: Cormac Reilly (Meath)

2007	Derry	–

=== All-Ireland Senior Football Championship ===
2007	Derry	–

2007	Derry	–

2007	Derry	–

2007	Derry	–

== Club scene ==
Glenullin won the 2007 Derry Senior Football Championship, the club's first since 1985.
