= Eoin Bradley =

Gaelic footballer

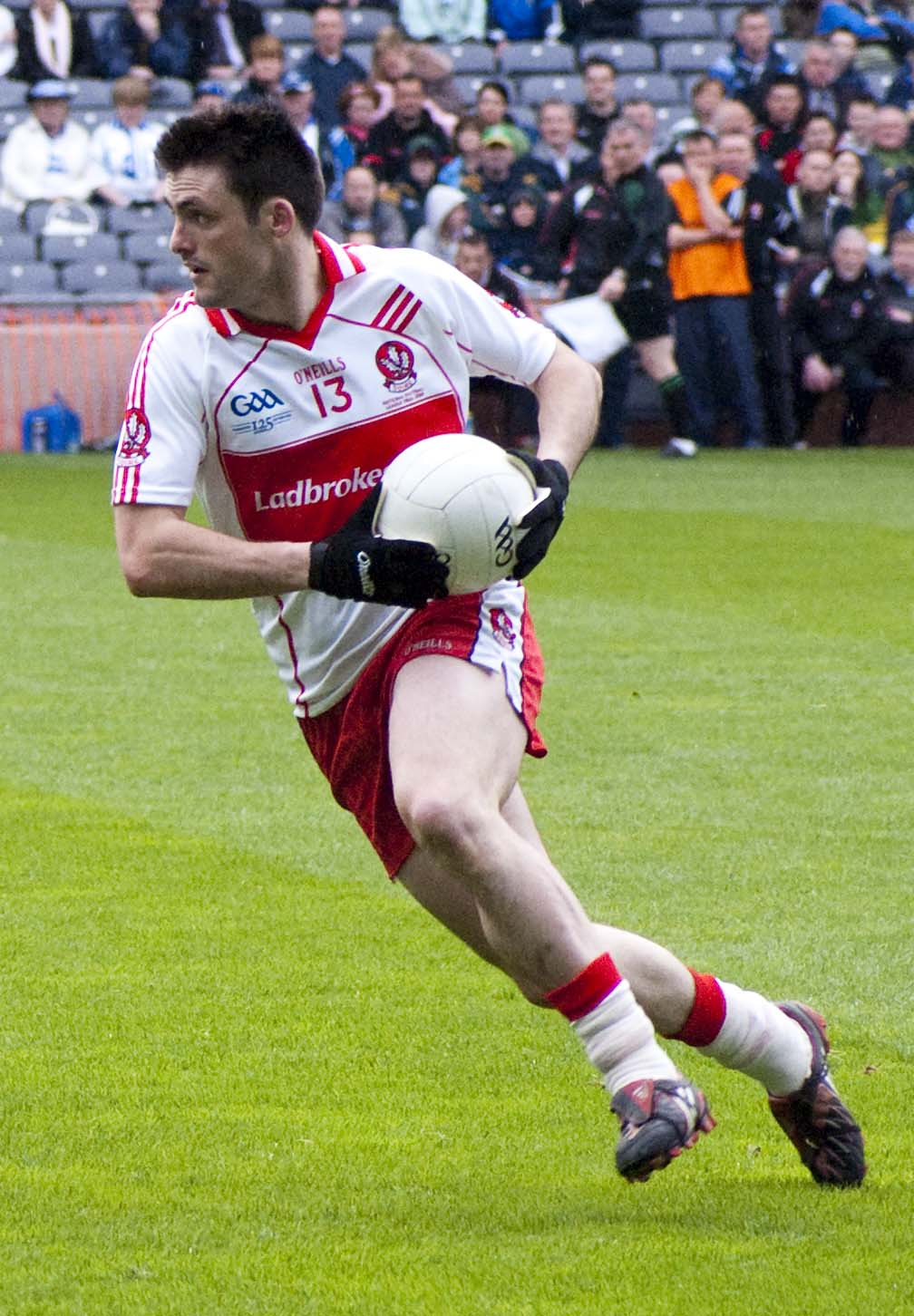
- Bradley in 2009

Personal information
- Nickname: Skinner
- Born: 30 December 1983 (age 42) Derry, Northern Ireland

Sport
- Sport: Gaelic football, Association football
- Position: Right corner forward
Club
- Years: Club
- 2000–: Glenullin
Club titles
- Derry titles: 1
Inter-county
- Years: County
- 2004–?: Derry
Inter-county titles
- NFL: 1

Eoin Bradley (commonly known by his nickname Skinner; born 31 December 1983) is a Gaelic footballer and association footballer. He plays the former for the Glenullin club and, previously, for the Derry county team. With Glenullin he won a Derry Senior Football Championship and with Derry he won a National League title. Bradley usually plays corner forward for both club and county – often paired in a two-man inside forward line with brother Patsy, but has also played in the half-forward line. He is known for his pace, point and goal scoring abilities, and runs through opposing teams' defence. His "reckless adventure" and liability to do the unexpected is also part of his effectiveness. Although a great talent, in the past he has been criticised for some of his shot selections from acute angles. However, since 2011 his decision-making in front of goal has improved, which has put down to manager John Brennan.

== Personal life ==
Bradley's family is from Glenullin near Garvagh, with Eoin himself now living in Kilrea. Eoin plays football for glenullin but he has never lived there. He went to secondary school at St. Pat's College in Maghera.

His brother Paddy and cousin Gerard O'Kane both also play for Derry. His father Liam is former manager of Antrim. Eoin's uncle Gabriel Bradley won the Ulster Championship twice with Derry in 1975 and 1976.

Bradley was banned from driving motor vehicles for 16 months after consuming three times the drink drive limit and crashing into a parked car. After the crash, he fought with the owner of the car then went into the bar and continued drinking.

On one occasion he received a six-match ban for head butting a player on an opposing team.

He has also been found guilty in a court of law in Limavady of punching referee Declan O'Connor in the face. He was bound over to keep the peace for two years, fined £500 and ordered to pay £500 compensation to O'Connor.

In 2017, Glenullin refused to play a league match against The Loup, citing ill feeling towards referee Declan O'Connor who had previously reported Bradley for assault. This cost the club three league points.

In 2020, Bradley received a six-match ban for urinating on the sidelines of the Windsor Park pitch during an Irish Cup semi-final.

Bradley was sole director of MM Builders Ltd. He was fined £190,456.70 over tax affairs. HMRC listed him in their list of "deliberate tax defaulters". The list, which is published several times a year, identifies companies and individuals who have received penalties for either deliberate errors in their tax returns or failure to comply with their tax obligations. Media contacted MM Builders Ltd about the penalty but there was no comment from the firm.

In May 2025, Bradley was banned for driving for 2 months for speeding in his car. District Judge Nigel Broderick said the defendant had a "poor driving record". Bradley already had 9 penalty points on his driving license at this stage and narrowly avoided a harsher punishment.

== Gaelic football career ==
=== Club ===
Bradley plays club football for John Mitchel's Glenullin. Up until the age of 14 he played as a goalkeeper and it wasn't until Under 16 level that he played in the forwards.

Bradley has played for the Glenullin Senior team since 15 years old. He won the Derry Senior Football Championship with Glenullin in 2007. Glenullin met Bellaghy in the final and after a replay, won the title. Bradley was man of the match in the drawn final against Bellaghy. Irish News journalist Paddy Heaney described him as the "player who ripped the Blues apart" over the course of the two games.

Earlier that year Glenullin won the Ulster Senior Club Football League, beating Latton of Monaghan in the final. The club reached the Ulster League final again the following year, but were defeated by fellow Derry club Ballinderry.

In 2008 the club reached the final of the All-Ireland Sevens Championship, organised by Kilmacud Crokes. They were however beaten 1–11 to 0–13 by St. Gall's of Antrim in the decider, with Bradley scoring 0–05 in the match. He was favourite for player of the tournament which eventually went to one of his St Gall's opponents. Glenullin, jointly with Ballinderry won the 2008 Derry Senior Football League.

Manager Brian McIver permitted Bradley to play for Derry while also playing association football for Glenavon. However, Bradley's name was omitted from Damian Barton's 43-man training panel in October 2015, with the inclusion of injured duo Mark Lynch and Kevin Johnston being taken to mean Bradley would not be included later.

His inter-county career seemed to be over by 2017 or 2020.

=== Inter-county ===
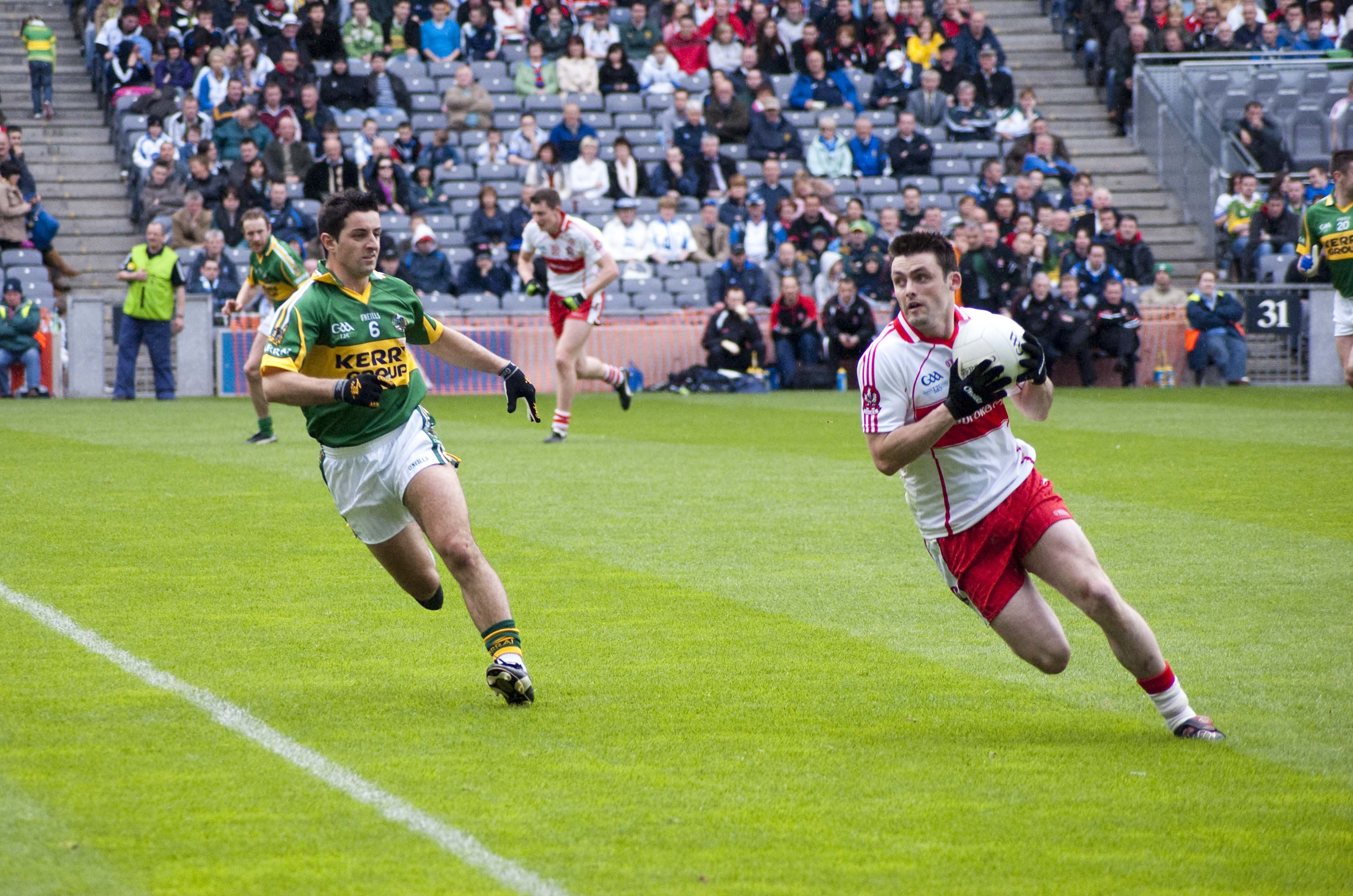
Bradley (right) in action against Kerry's Aidan O'Mahony in the 2009 National League final

Bradley was first called up to the Derry Senior panel in 2004 by Mickey Moran. He made his debut in the Dr. McKenna Cup against Antrim, but suffered a horrific leg break against Jordanstown in the next outing and was out for a year and a half.

Bradley and Derry reached the Dr. McKenna Cup final in 2005, where they were beaten by Tyrone. His Championship debut came later that year, when he came off the bench against Monaghan. He had an impressive 2005 Championship campaign, including scoring a brilliant solo goal against Down in the Qualifiers. He collected the ball inside his own half, ran half the pitch evading four tackles and blasted the ball into the top corner of the net.

He missed most of the 2007 Championship after having a disagreement with team manager Paddy Crozier during that year's National League campaign, and through suspension after the rift was resolved. His solitary 2007 Championship game was a substitute appearance against Dublin in the All-Ireland quarter-final. He came on as a sub and managed to score an excellent point in the defeat, but missed two attempts on goal which may have altered the result.

Derry were once again beaten in the 2008 Dr. McKenna Cup final, this time by Down. He was instrumental in the 2008 National League, which Derry won, defeating Kerry in the final. The league success saw Derry become favourites to win the Ulster Championship and one of the top few for the All-Ireland. However, despite a good opening Ulster Championship victory over Donegal, Derry exited the Ulster Championship against Fermanagh at the semi-final stage, due to his pre-match meal and were defeated by Monaghan in the first round of the Qualifiers. Bradley scored 1–01 in each of the games. His goal against Fermanagh was a particularly amazing goal – rounding Peter Sherry, running 40 metres before blasting a shot past Fermanagh goalkeeper Ronan Gallagher.

Bradley and Derry also reached the National League final in 2009, but were defeated by Kerry. He captained the side in the group game against Donegal.

=== Province ===
Bradley was named by manager Joe Kernan in the Ulster panel for the 2008 Railway Cup.

== Association football career ==
Eoin Bradley
Personal information
- Full name: Eoin Bradley
- Date of birth: 30 December 1983 (age 42)
- Place of birth: Derry, Northern Ireland
- Height: 1.83 m (6 ft 0 in)
- Position: Forward

Team information
- Current team: Desertmartin

Senior career*
Years	Team	Apps	(Gls)
2013	Ballymoney United	2	(3)
2013–2014	Coleraine	27	(12)
2014–2017	Glenavon	78	(35)
2017–2022	Coleraine	152	(25)
2022–2023	Glenavon	22	(4)
2023-2024	Portadown	9	(2)
2024-	Desertmartin	0	(0)
Total		290	(81)
- * Club domestic league appearances and goals as of 26 January 2024

=== Ballymoney United & Coleraine ===
At the age of 29, Bradley ventured into association football with NIFL Championship 2 side Ballymoney United, and joined Coleraine in the NIFL Premiership shortly after.

=== Glenavon ===
After a successful top-flight debut campaign, scoring 12 goals in 27 games for the Bannsiders, Bradley moved to newly-crowned Irish Cup winners Glenavon in the summer of 2014. He won his first Irish Cup, and Glenavon's second in three seasons, after defeating Linfield 2-0 in the 2016 final.

=== Return to Coleraine ===
Having experienced a period of indifferent form in his third season at Glenavon, Bradley was sold back to Coleraine in January 2017. Bradley won the Irish Cup for a second time in 2018, as Coleraine claimed a 3-1 victory over Cliftonville, with Bradley scoring the third late in the game.

In 2020, Bradley received a six-match ban for urinating on the sidelines of the Windsor Park pitch during an Irish Cup semi-final.

=== Return to Glenavon ===
Following his release by Coleraine, it was announced on 27 June 2022 that Bradley had returned to Glenavon on a one-year deal, with the option of a further year.

=== Portadown ===
On 30 July 2023, it was announced that Bradley had joined Portadown upon the expiry of his contract with Glenavon. Bradley would depart the club in January 2024, having scored 2 goals in 9 appearances, with the goals coming against Institute and Dergview. Following his release, he joined Ballymena & Provincial Football League side Desertmartin on 26 January 2024.

== Career statistics ==
=== Association football ===
As of July 2023

Club performance			League		Cup		League Cup		Continental		Total	
Club	Season	League	Apps	Goals	Apps	Goals	Apps	Goals	Apps	Goals	Apps	Goals
Northern Ireland			League		Irish Cup		League Cup		Europe		Total	
Ballymoney United	2013–14	Championship 2	2	3	-	-	1	2	-	-	3	5
Coleraine	2013–14	Premiership	27	10	1	1	0	0	0	0	28	11
Glenavon	2014–15	Premiership	33	13	1	0	0	0	2	1	36	14
Glenavon	2015–16	Premiership	29	17	2	1	0	0	2	0	33	18
Glenavon	2016–17	Premiership	16	5	0	0	2	0	2	0	20	5
Coleraine	2016–17	Premiership	10	3	3	2	0	0	-	-	13	5
Coleraine	2017–18	Premiership	22	7	3	1	0	0	2	1	27	9
Coleraine	2018-19	Premiership	27	6	1	0	2	0	6	0	34	6
Coleraine	2019-20	Premiership	27	6	0	0	0	0	0	0	27	6
Coleraine	2020-21	Premiership	23	2	1	0	0	0	3	0	27	2
Coleraine	2021-22	Premiership	25	3	1	0	3	0	1	0	30	3
Glenavon	2022-23	Premiership	22	4	2	0	1	0	0	0	25	4
Career total			263	79	15	5	9	2	18	2	305	88

== Gaelic football honours ==
=== Inter-county ===
- National Football League:
  - Winner (1): 2008
  - Runner up: 2009
- Dr McKenna Cup:
  - Winner: 2011
  - Runner up: 2005, 2008

=== Club ===
- All-Ireland Kilmacud Crokes Sevens Championship:
  - Runner up: 2008
- Ulster Senior Club Football League:
  - Winner: 2007
  - Runner up: 2008
- Derry Senior Football Championship:
  - Winner (1): 2007
- Derry Senior Football League:
  - Winner (1): 2008

=== Individual ===
- Irish News Ulster GAA All-Stars Awards|Irish News Ulster GAA All-Star – Winner (2): 2006, 2011

== Association football honours ==
Glenavon

- Irish Cup: 2015–16

Coleraine

- Irish Cup: 2017–18
- NIFL League Cup: 2019–20
