= 2008 International Rules Series =

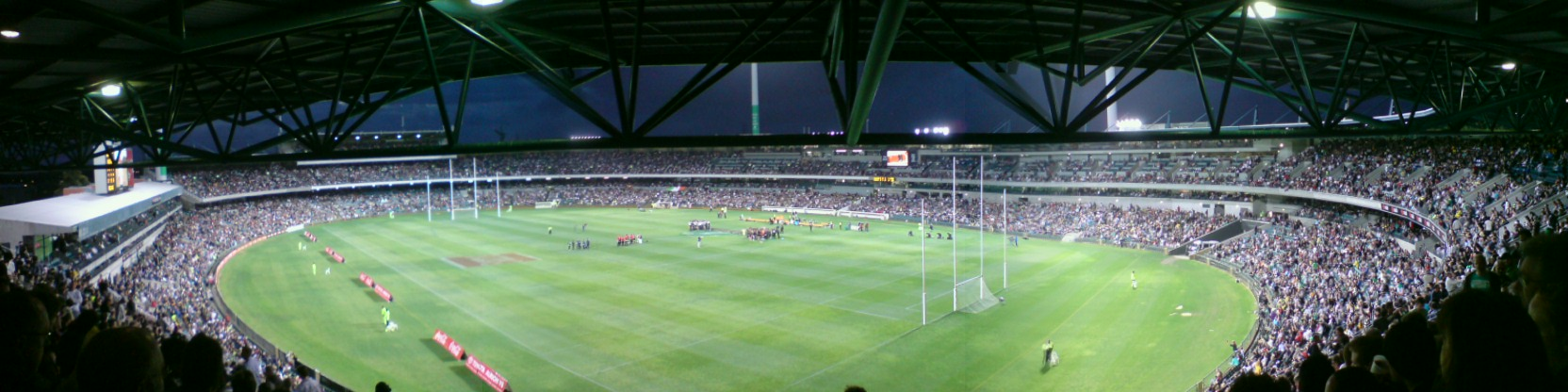
- 2008 international rules series at Subiaco Oval, Perth, Western Australia
- Event: International Rules Series
Australia	Ireland
97	102
- 97–102 on aggregate, Ireland win series 2–0

First test
Australia	Ireland
44	45
- Date: 24 October 2008
- Venue: Subiaco Oval, Perth
- Referee: Pat McEnaney (Ireland); Steve McBurney (Australia)
- Attendance: 35,153

Second test
Ireland	Australia
57	53
- Date: 31 October 2008
- Venue: Melbourne Cricket Ground, Melbourne
- Referee: Pat McEnaney (Ireland); Steve McBurney (Australia)
- Attendance: 42,823

The 2008 International Rules Series was the 14th annual International Rules Series and was played between Ireland and Australia.

After the 2007 series was cancelled by the Gaelic Athletic Association, the Australian Football League and the GAA agreed in 2008 to resume the series.

The matches were played in Australia – 24 October in Perth, Western Australia and 31 October in Melbourne (after the AFL Grand Final and All-Ireland Senior Football Championship).

Ireland won by five points on aggregate after recording victories in both tests.

== Rule changes ==
- Maximum of 14 interchanges per quarter.
- Teams are allowed only four consecutive hand passes (ball must then be kicked).
- Match time reduced from 20 to 18 minutes per quarter (with stoppage time for breaks in play).
- Goalkeeper can no longer kick the ball to himself from the kick-out.
- Suspensions may carry over the GAA and AFL matches if The Match Review Panel see fit.
- A dangerous "slinging" tackle will be an automatic red card.
- A shirtfront endangering the head will result in a red card.
- Physical intimidation can result in a yellow card.
- One-handed tackles result in a free kick.
- An independent referee can cite players for reportable offenses from the stands.
- Yellow cards sin bin reduced to 10 minutes.

== Squads ==
Australia			Ireland		
Name	Team	Position	Name	Team	Position
Nathan Bock	Adelaide		Seán Boylan	Meath	Coach
Matthew Boyd	Western Bulldogs		Seán Cavanagh	Tyrone	Captain
Jared Brennan	Brisbane Lions		Graham Canty	Cork	Vice-captain
Campbell Brown	Hawthorn	Vice-captain	David Gallagher	Meath	
Shaun Burgoyne	Port Adelaide		Colm Begley	Laois/Brisbane Lions	
Matt Campbell	North Melbourne		Paddy Bradley	Derry	
Ryan Crowley	Fremantle		Kevin Reilly	Meath	
Michael Firrito	North Melbourne		Benny Coulter	Down	
Nathan Foley	Richmond		Bryan Cullen	Dublin	
Brent Harvey	North Melbourne	Captain	Kieran Donaghy	Kerry	
Roger Hayden	Fremantle		Leighton Glynn	Wicklow	
Leigh Montagna	St Kilda		Finian Hanley	Galway	
Daniel Motlop	Port Adelaide		John Keane	Westmeath	
Marc Murphy	Carlton		Aaron Kernan	Armagh	
Michael Osborne	Hawthorn		Ciarán Lyng	Wexford	
Scott Pendlebury	Collingwood		Steven McDonnell	Armagh	
Drew Petrie	North Melbourne		Enda McGinley	Tyrone	
David Rodan	Port Adelaide		Ciarán McKeever	Armagh	
Max Rooke	Geelong		Joe McMahon	Tyrone	
Brad Sewell	Hawthorn		Justin McMahon	Tyrone	
Kade Simpson	Carlton		Michael Meehan	Galway	
Adam Selwood	West Coast	Vice-captain	John Miskella	Cork	
Dale Thomas	Collingwood		Aidan O'Mahony	Kerry	
Scott Thompson	Adelaide		Pearse O'Neill	Cork	
Daniel Wells	North Melbourne		Tom Parsons	Mayo	
Mick Malthouse	Collingwood	Coach	Killian Young	Kerry	
			Paul Finlay	Monaghan	
			Martin McGrath	Fermanagh	
			Aidan Carr	Down	On Standby
			Rónán Clarke	Armagh	On Standby
			Conor Gormley	Tyrone	On Standby
			Kevin McCloy	Derry	On Standby

Notes:

- Main sources for squads: BBC Sport Online and Hogan Stand.
- Kerry's Tommy Walsh was named on the original Irish squad, but had to withdraw due to club commitments with Kerins O'Rahilly's. He was replaced by Paul Finlay.
- Dublin's Bernard Brogan was named on the Irish original squad, but had to withdraw due to club commitments with St Oliver Plunketts/Eoghan Ruadh. He was replaced by Martin McGrath.
- The match-day squad for both teams was limited to 24 players each. Thus Australia (who had a 25 man squad) had to drop one player for each test and Ireland (who had a 27 man squad) had to drop three players.

Ireland manager Boylan was criticised for including David Gallagher in his squad, as he was not then playing inter-county football.

=== Irish management team ===
- Coach – Seán Boylan
- Selectors:
  - Anthony Tohill
  - Hugh Kenny
  - Eoin Liston
- Runner – Seán Marty Lockhart
- Backroom team:
  - Trevor Brennan (fitness & tackling)
  - Mike McGurn (fitness & tackling)
- Tour Manager – Seán Walsh
- Assistant Tour Manager – Tommy Kilcoyne
- Team doctor – Owen Clarke
- Physiotherapist – Frank Foley
- Masseur – Martin Regan
- Kit manager – Owen Lynch
- Waterboys – Ciaran Boylan and Pauric Gallagher

Notes:

- Main sources: Hogan Stand

=== Refereeing team ===
- Main referees – Pat McEnaney (Ireland) and Stephen McBurney (Australia)
- Standby referees / linesmen – David Coldrick (Ireland) and Brett Rosebury (Australia)
- Umpires – Gearóid Ó Conámha & John Bannon (Ireland) and Steven Axon & Peter Nastasi (Australia)
- Video match referee – Ian Curlewis (South Africa)

Notes:

- Main source: Hogan Stand

== Matches ==
=== First test ===
Team	1	2	3	4	Total
Australia	0.0.1	0.5.4	0.7.7	0.12.8	0.12.8 (44)
Ireland	0.1.6	1.2.7	3.5.8	3.6.9	3.6.9 (45)
Ireland won by 1 point

Date	Friday 24 October 2008
Scoring (AUS)	Goals: Nil Overs: Marc Murphy 4, Matt Campbell 2, Scott Thompson 2, Leigh Montagna, Brent Harvey, Michael Osborne, David Rodan
Scoring (IRL)	Goals: Seán Cavanagh, Leighton Glynn, Steven McDonnell Overs: Seán Cavanagh 2, Paddy Bradley, Leighton Glynn, Kieran Donaghy, Ciarán Lyng
Best	AUS: Murphy, Selwood, Harvey, Simpson, Thomas, Osborne IRL: Glynn, Cavanagh, Gallagher, Joe McMahon, McKeever, Canty, Hanley
Reports	Campbell Brown (Australia) – yellow card (10-minute sin bin)
Injuries	None
Venue	Subiaco Oval, Perth, Australia
Attendance	35,153
Umpires	Steve McBurney (Australia); Pat McEnaney (Ireland)
Match stats
AFL.com Match overview AFL.com Match report RTÉ Match report Hogan Stand report

=== Second test ===
Team	1	2	3	4	Total
Australia	0.4.3	0.5.5	1.6.9	3.8.11	3.8.11 (53)
Ireland	0.3.3	2.6.6	3.8.8	4.8.9	4.8.9 (57)
Ireland won by 4 points

Date	Friday 31 October 2008
Scoring (AUS)	Goals: Shaun Burgoyne, Marc Murphy, Drew Petrie Overs: Drew Petrie 2, Daniel Wells 2, Jared Brennan, Campbell Brown, Shaun Burgoyne, Michael Osborne
Scoring (IRL)	Goals: Benny Coulter 2, Kieran Donaghy, Enda McGinley Overs: Seán Cavanagh 4, Paddy Bradley, Benny Coulter, Kieran Donaghy, Paul Finlay
Best	AUS: Crowley, Simpson, Boyd, Harvey, Petrie IRL: Canty, Coulter, Cavanagh, Glynn, Bradley
Reports	None
Injuries	None
Venue	Melbourne Cricket Ground, Melbourne, Australia
Attendance	42,823
Umpires	Steve McBurney (Australia); Pat McEnaney (Ireland)
Match stats
AFL.com Match overview AFL.com Match report RTÉ Match report
