= Paddy Bradley =

Derry Gaelic footballer

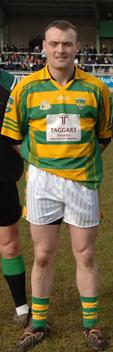

Personal information
- Born: 23 May 1981 (age 45)
- Occupation: Teacher
- Height: 5 ft 11 in (180 cm)

Sport
- Sport: Gaelic football
- Position: Full forward
Club
- Years: Club
- 1997–: Glenullin
Club titles
- Derry titles: 1
- Ulster titles: Ulster
Inter-county*
Years	County	Apps (scores)
1999–2012	Derry	44 (13–177 (216))
Inter-county titles
- Ulster titles: 0
- All-Irelands: 0
- NFL: 2
- All Stars: 1
- *Inter County team apps and scores correct as of 21:28, 14 September 2008 (UTC) (UTC); Includes Championship games only.

Patrick Bradley (born 23 May 1981) is an Irish sportsman who plays Gaelic football for John Mitchel's Glenullin and the Derry county team. With the county he has won two National League titles, and individually an All Stars Award for his performance in the 2007 All-Ireland Senior Football Championship (and has been nominated a further four times).

With his club Bradley has won the Derry Senior Football Championship. He usually plays at full forward for both club and county. Bradley is regarded as one of the best forwards in Ireland, due to his accuracy in front of the posts with both left and right feet - from both open play and frees.

He has consistently been a high scorer for Derry, with a career high of 2-38 (44 points)^{[A1]} during the 2004 All-Ireland Championship. He is third all-time top Ulster scorer in Championship football with a tally of 13-177 (216 points).

== Early and personal life ==
Bradley is from Kilrea, County Londonderry, Northern Ireland. He attended secondary school at St Patrick's College, Maghera. Later he attended the University of Ulster Jordanstown.

Bradley is from a football background. His brother Eoin and cousin Gerard O'Kane both also play for Derry. His father Liam is current manager of Antrim. His uncle, Gabriel Bradley, was part of the Derry team that won back-to-back Ulster Championships in 1975 and 1976.

== Playing career ==
=== Club ===
Bradley plays club football for John Mitchel's Glenullin. He captained the club to success in the 2007 Derry Senior Football Championship.

His ten points (six from open play) against reigning champions Ballinderry in the semi-final was instrumental in Glenullin reaching the final. Glenullin met Bellaghy in the final and after a replay, won the title.

A combination of Bellaghy's defensive screen system and tight man-marking by Michael McGoldrick kept Bradley relatively quiet in both games. However, he scored the winning point in the injury-time to secure the Championship for Glenullin.

Earlier that year, Glenullin won the Ulster Senior Club Football League, beating Latton of Monaghan in the final. The club reached the Ulster League final again the following year, but were defeated by fellow Derry club Ballinderry. In 2008 the club reached the final of the All-Ireland Sevens Championship, organised by Kilmacud Crokes.^{B} However, they were beaten 1–11 to 0–13 by St. Gall's of Antrim in the decider, although Bradley scored 0-05.^{[A2]} Glenullin, jointly with Ballinderry won the 2008 Derry Senior Football League. Bradley was Glenullin captain for four seasons between 2005 and 2008.

While in the United States in the summer of 2003, Bradley played for the Wolfe Tones GAA Club in Chicago. After a replay the Wolfe Tones won the Chicago Senior Football Championship.

=== Inter-county ===
Bradley made his debut for the Derry Senior team in late 1999 aged 18.

In his first season Derry won the 2000 National League, defeating Meath in the final. He made his Championship^{C} debut later that year in the Ulster Championship against Cavan, and Derry reached the Ulster final, but lost to Armagh. The following season he received his first nomination for an All Stars Award, as Derry reached the All-Ireland semi-final but were defeated by Galway.

In 2004, Bradley (2-38) and Enda Muldoon (3-24) contributed nearly 70% of Derry's total of 7-92 (113 points) in that year's Championship. Bradley received another All Star nomination that year.

Bradley was Derry captain in 2005 and received a third All Star nomination that year. Longford knocked Derry out of the 2006 Championship after a suspense-filled game, despite Bradley's scoring 2–07 against them. In addition to another All Star nomination in 2006, he was also nominated for the full forward spot on the inaugural GPA Gaelic Team of the Year, but lost out to Kieran Donaghy of Kerry.

In January 2007 Bradley was named Most Valuable Player in the All Star match between the 2006 and 2005 All Stars.

In April 2007 Bradley was banned for 12 weeks after a "minor physical interference" with a referee in a club game for Glenullin. He appealed the decision to both the Derry County Board and the Ulster Council, but both were rejected. However, the suspension was lifted after an appeal to the Disputes Resolution Authority, held on 29 May.

Bradley had an impressive season in 2007, ending with five points from play in the All-Ireland quarter-final defeat to Dublin. On 19 October 2007, he was announced as full forward on the 2007 All Star team. He was also named in the 2007 GPA Team of the Year.

Derry finished top of Division 1 of the 2008 National League and along with second placed Kerry qualified for the final, which Derry won.

Derry become the favourites to win the Ulster Championship. However, despite a good opening Ulster Championship victory over Donegal, (where Bradley scored 10 points in a man of the match display, Derry exited the Ulster Championship against Fermanagh at the semi-final stage and were defeated by Monaghan in the first round of the Qualifiers. He again received a nomination for a GPA All Star.

Bradley and Derry again reached the National League final in 2009, but were defeated by Kerry. Derry opened their 2009 Championship campaign with a win over Monaghan. However, they were defeated in the next round by Tyrone. Bradley was named captain for that game in the absence of suspended regular captain Fergal Doherty and injured vice-captain Niall McCusker.

Bradley only scored one point against Tyrone and it later emerged he was carrying an injury into the game. They were drawn against Monaghan again in the first round of the Qualifiers. On Monday 6 July 2009, five days ahead of the second clash with Monaghan, shock reports emerged that Bradley had quit the Derry panel. Speculation mounted that he had told the then county manager Damian Cassidy he was leaving after an in-house training game the day before. The Derry County Board released a statement on Monday night stating "Such rumours are totally unfounded and without substance".

Bradley played against Monaghan and scored 2-08 (2-06 from play) in a man-of-the-match performance. Derry's 2009 campaign however ended the following week with defeat to Donegal, with Bradley being forced off injured in the second half. In November 2010, with a new Derry manager in place, it was reported by The Irish News that Bradley would again be available for selection for the 2011 county panel.

==== Championship scoring details ====
Year	Tally	Total	Matches	Average	Notes
2000	1-09	12 points	4	3	
2001	2-17	23	7	3.3	Joint highest Ulster scorer, 10th in Ireland
2002	1-11	14	4	3.5	
2003	2-11	17	4	4.25	
2004	2-38	44	7	6.3	Highest Ulster scorer, 3rd in Ireland
2005	2-29	35	5	7	Second highest Ulster scorer, 2nd in Ireland
2006	2-20	26	4	6.5	Highest Ulster scorer, 6th in Ireland
2007	1-25	28	6	5.6	
2008	0-17	17	3	5.7	

=== Province ===
Bradley won Railway Cup medals with Ulster in 2004 and 2007.

=== International ===
Bradley was overlooked for a place on the Ireland squad for the 2004 International Rules Series against Australia. In 2005, despite scoring 24 points in a trial game he missed out again. He was in contention for a place in the 2006 team, but did not make the final 25-man panel due to injury/fitness concerns. The 2007 series was cancelled, Bradley was however selected for the 2008 Series in Australia.

=== School and college ===
Playing in the half forward line, Bradley reached the 1998 MacRory Cup final with St. Pat's, but they were defeated by St Colman's College, Newry. He also played hurling at school and helped the school win the Mageean Cup.

Bradley was part of the UUJ team that won the Sigerson Cup in 2001. He was top scorer in the final with 0-05. He also won two Ryan Cup medals with the university.

== Media work ==
Bradley has appeared on the BBC's championship coverage.

== Managerial career ==
Bradley managed Newbridge to the Derry Intermediate Football Championship and was an Antrim coach working with his father Liam. Paddy Bradley was then "involved with" the Donegal Gaeltacht club Gaoth Dobhair. In late 2020, he was appointed as Derry under-20 football manager.

In November 2022, Bradley joined the backroom team of the Donegal senior footballers, working under the management of Paddy Carr.

== Honours ==
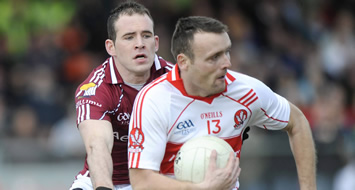
Bradley in action against Galway in a 2009 National League game

=== Inter-county ===
- National Football League:
  - Winner (2): 2000, 2008
  - Runner-up: 2009
- Ulster Senior Football Championship:
  - Runner up: 2000
- Dr McKenna Cup:
  - Runner up: 2005, 2008, more?

=== Club ===
- All-Ireland Kilmacud Crokes Sevens Championship:
  - Runner up: 2008
- Ulster Senior Club Football League:
  - Winner: 2007
  - Runner up: 2008
- Derry Senior Football Championship:
  - Winner (1): 2007
- Derry Senior Football League:
  - Winner (1): 2008
- Chicago Senior Football Championship:
  - Winner (1): 2003

=== School and college ===
- Sigerson Cup:
  - Winner (1): 2001
- Ryan Cup:
  - Winner (2): Years?
- MacRory Cup:
  - Runner up: 1998
- Mageenan Cup (hurling):
  - Winner (at least 1): 1998

=== Province ===
- Railway Cup:
  - Winner (2): 2004, 2007

=== International ===
- International Rules Series:
  - Winner (1): 2008

=== Individual ===
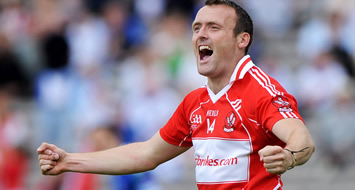
Bradley celebrates scoring against Monaghan in the 2009 Championship

- All Star:
  - Winner (1): 2007
  - Nominated (runner up): 2001, 2004, 2005, 2006
- GPA All Star:
  - Winner (1): 2007
  - Nominated (runner-up): 2006, 2008
- Irish News Ulster GAA All-Star - Winner (5): 2001, 2004, 2005, 2006, 2007
- Derry Senior football captain: 2005
- Derry Senior Football Championship winning captain: 2007

Note: The above lists may be incomplete. Please add any other honours you know of.

== Notes ==
- A. ^{1} ^{2} Scores are recorded in the format {goal total}-{point total}; a goal is where the ball goes under the crossbar and a point is where the ball goes over the crossbar. Each goal equals three points. For example, 2-38 = 2 goals and 38 points, making a total of 2 × 3 + 38 = 44 points. See GAA scoring rules for more information.
- B. Sevens is a form of Gaelic football where teams consist of seven players instead of the normal 15. Games are shorter, faster, more open and higher-scoring than normal football.
- C. The All-Ireland Senior Football Championship is the premier inter-county competition, contested by 31 of Ireland's 32 counties (plus New York and London).

Each county participates in their respective provincial championship (in Derry's case the Ulster Championship) which operate through a knock-out cup competition format. The winners of each of the four Provincial Championships earn one of eight places in the All-Ireland quarter-finals. The 28 teams that fail to win their respective provincial championships receive a second opportunity to reach the All-Ireland quarter-finals via the All Ireland Qualifiers. The counties enter the Qualifiers at different stages (depending on how far they reached in their provincial championship). Four teams come through this system and join the four provincial champions in the All-Ireland quarter-finals.

Gaelic games
Preceded by Seán Marty Lockhart	Derry senior football captain 2005	Succeeded by Johnny McBride
Preceded by Conleith Gilligan (Ballinderry)	Derry Senior Football Championship winning captain 2007	Succeeded by Enda Muldoon (Ballinderry)
