= David Gallagher (Gaelic footballer) =

Irish Gaelic footballer

Personal information
- Native name: Daithí Ó Gallchóir (Irish)
- Born: 7 March 1980 (age 46) Drogheda, Ireland
- Height: 1.91 m (6 ft 3 in)

Sport
- Sport: Gaelic Football
- Position: Goalkeeper
Club
- Years: Club
- 1998-: St Peters Dunboyne
Club titles
- Meath titles: 2
Inter-county
Years	County	Apps (scores)
1999-2012	Meath	38 (0-0)
Inter-county titles
- Leinster titles: 2

David Gallagher (born 7 March 1980) is an Irish sportsperson who currently plays Gaelic football for Meath Senior Football Championship club St Peters Dunboyne and was a member of the senior Meath county squad from 1999 to 2005 but returned in 2009 following the brief retirement of Brendan Murphy but was forced to retire due to injuries. In October 2011 it was announced that Gallagher would seeking return to Goalkeeping following speculations that Murphy was considering retirement. Two months later Gallagher was recalled to the Meath after the second retirement of Brendan Murphy In November 2012 Gallagher confirms his second retirement from Inter County football.

He was selected as part of the Ireland squad for the 2008 International Rules Series, despite not then playing inter-county football, a decision which led to criticism of manager Seán Boylan.

== Honours ==
- Leinster Senior Football Championship (1): 2001
- Leinster Under-21 Football Championship (1): 2001
