= John Brennan (Derry Gaelic footballer) =

Gaelic football player and manager

Personal information
- Native name: Seán Ó Braonáin (Irish)
- Born: 22 August 1942 (age 84)

Sport
- Sport: Gaelic football
Club management
- Years: Club
- Erin's Own Lavey
Inter-county management
- Years: Team
- 2010–2012: Derry

John Brennan (born 22 August 1942) is a Gaelic football manager. Labelled as the 'Godfather' of Derry football, Brennan played for his local club Erin's Own Lavey and at senior level for the Derry county team.

In September 2010, Brennan was appointed as the new Derry manager following Damien Cassidy's departure. In the summer of 2012, Brennan stepped down as manager, being succeeded by Brian McIver.

Preceded by Damien Cassidy	Derry Senior Football Manager; 2010–2012	Succeeded by Brian McIver
