= Barry McGoldrick =

Irish Gaelic footballer (born 1985)

Personal information
- Born: 29 April 1985 (age 41) Portstewart, County Londonderry, Northern Ireland
- Occupation: Student
- Height: 6 ft 2 in (188 cm)

Sport
- Football Position: Half forward / half back
- Hurling Position: ?
Club
- Years: Club
- ?-present: Eoghan Rua
Club titles
	Football	Hurling
Derry titles	2	-
Inter-county
Years	County	Apps (scores)
2006–present ?-?	Derry (F); Derry (H)	? ?
Inter-county titles
	Football	Hurling
Ulster Titles	-	-
All-Ireland Titles	-	-
League titles	1	-

Barry McGoldrick (born 29 April 1985) is an Irish Gaelic footballer who plays for the Derry county team, with whom he has won a National League title. He is also the current team captain. At underage level he won the Ulster Minor and All-Ireland Minor Championships with the county.

McGoldrick plays club football for Eoghan Rua and has won the Derry Senior Football Championship with the club. He is a dual player in that he also plays hurling for Eoghan Rua, and has in the past also hurled for Derry, winning the Nicky Rackard Cup.

== Early and family life ==
McGoldrick is from Portstewart, County Londonderry, Northern Ireland. His father Sean played for Antrim. His brother Sean Leo has also played football and hurling for Derry. His brother Ciaran and cousin Niall Holly are also part of the Derry panel and youngest brother Colm part of the under-21 panel. His sisters play camogie for Derry. His sister Grainne was nominated for Camogie All Stars in both 2006 and 2008.

== Football career ==
=== Inter-county ===
McGoldrick was part of the Derry Minor side that won the 2002 Ulster Minor Championship and All-Ireland Minor Championship. He was a member of the Derry Under-21 team that finished runners-up to Tyrone in the 2006 Ulster Under-21 Football Championship.

McGoldrick was called up to the Derry Senior football panel in November 2005 for the 2006 season. He started in Derry's opening 2006 Championship games against Tyrone and Donegal, but missed the Kildare and Longford games due to a broken hand. He had an injury hit season in 2007, but came back strongly in 2008 starting all Derry's National League games. He was part of the Derry team that won the 2008 National League where Derry beat Kerry in the final.

McGoldrick and Derry also reached the National League final in 2009, but were defeated by Kerry. He missed the final due to injury. In that campaign he mostly played at centre half back, as opposed to his usual role in the forward line and has remained as a defender ever since. He has been named as the Derry captain for the 2011 season by new manager John Brennan.

==== Championship games ====
Score column lists Derry's score first.

Date	Venue	Opponent	Score	Mins	Result	Competition
28 May 2006	Healy Park, Omagh	Tyrone	0-00	70	1-08 – 0-05	Ulster SFC QF
19 June 2006	St Tiernach's Park, Clones	Donegal	0-00	35	0–11 – 1–13	Ulster SFC SF
10 June 2007	Casement Park, Belfast	Antrim	0-01	45	1–13 – 0–10	Ulster SFC QF
24 June 2007	Casement Park, Belfast	Monaghan	0-00	15^{1}	1-09 – 0–14	Ulster SFC SF
8 July 2007	St Tiernach's Park, Clones	Armagh	0-01	70	0–10 – 0-09	Qualifiers R1
15 July 2007	Celtic Park, Derry	Mayo	0-01	29	2–13 – 1-06	Qualifiers R2
11 August 2007	Croke Park, Dublin	Dublin	0-00	?^{1}	0–15 – 0–18	All-Ireland SFC QF

1. Indicates substitute appearance.

=== Club ===
McGoldrick was instrumental in the Eoghan Rua side that won both the 2006 Derry Intermediate and Ulster Intermediate Championships, before losing out in the 2007 All-Ireland Intermediate Club Championship final to Ardfert of Kerry. He was an important member of the Eoghan Rua team which won the 2010 & 2018 Derry Senior Football Championship, beating favourites Ballinderry in the 2010 final and Lavey in the 2018 final.

=== School/college ===
McGoldrick attended Loreto College in Coleraine, and captained the school to the McLarnon Cup semi-final in 2003. McGoldirck attends St. Mary's University College in Belfast and plays football for the college. He won the CAU Indoor 7s Competition with St Mary's in 2008.

=== International ===
McGoldrick represented Ireland in the Under-17 International Rules Series in 2002.

== Hurling career ==
=== Inter-county ===
McGoldrick was part of the Derry minor hurling sides that lost out to Antrim in both the 2002 and 2003 Ulster Minor Hurling Championship finals.

His first taste of senior inter-county action came when he was 18, with the Derry hurling team, when Sean "Roe" McCloskey was manager. He was part of the Derry Senior team that won the 2006 Nicky Rackard Cup, but missed playing in the final due to a hand injury. He no longer hurls with Derry; now concentrating on football.

=== Club ===
McGoldrick won both the Derry Intermediate Hurling Championship and Derry Junior Hurling Championship with Eoghan Rua in 2006.

== Honours ==
=== Country ===
- Under 17 International Rules Series:
  - Winner (1): 2002

=== Inter-county ===
==== Senior ====
- National Football League:
  - Winner (1): 2008
  - Runner-up: 2009
- Nicky Rackard Cup:
  - Winner (1): 2006

==== Under 21 ====
- Ulster Under-21 Football Championship:
  - Runner up: 2004??, 2006

==== Minor ====
- All-Ireland Minor Football Championship:
  - Winner (1): 2002
- Ulster Minor Football Championship:
  - Winner (1): 2002
- Ulster Minor Hurling Championship:
  - Runner up: 2002, 2003

=== Club ===
- Derry Senior Football Championship
  - Winner (2): 2010, 2018
- All-Ireland 7s Club Football Championship: 2017
- Derry Senior Football League: 2017
- Ulster Senior Football League: 2017, 2018
- All-Ireland Intermediate Club Football Championship:
  - Runner up: 2007
- Ulster Intermediate Club Football Championship:
  - Winner (1): 2006
- Derry Intermediate Football Championship:
  - Winner (1): 2006
  - Runner up: 2005
- Derry Intermediate Hurling Championship:
  - Winner (at least 1): 2006, more?
- Derry Junior Hurling Championship:
  - Winner (3): 2006, 2015, 2019
- Ulster Junior Hurling Championship:
  - Winner (2): 2015, 2019
- Underage competitions

=== School/college ===
- CAU Indoor 7s Competition:
  - Winner (1): 2008

Note: The above lists may be incomplete. Please add any other honours you know of.

Gaelic games
Preceded by Gerard O'Kane	Derry senior football captain 2011	Succeeded by Incumbent
