= Blaine Kelly =

Irish Gaelic footballer

Personal information
- Native name: Blaine Ó Ceallaigh (Irish)
- Born: Saggart, County Dublin, Ireland

Sport
- Sport: Gaelic football
- Position: Forward
Club
- Years: Club
- St Mary's
Inter-county
Years	County	Apps (scores)
2009-Present	Dublin	0 (0-00)
Inter-county titles
- Leinster titles: 1
- All Stars: 0

Blaine Kelly is a Gaelic footballer who plays for the St Mary's club and for the Dublin county team. He has already played a few times in the National Football League for Dublin and made his Championship debut against Meath in June 2009.

He won a Leinster football title in 2009.
