= Paul Murphy (Derry Gaelic footballer) =

Derry Gaelic footballer

Personal information
- Native name: Pól Ó Murchú (Irish)
- Born: 20 September 1979 (age 47) Dungiven, County Londonderry, Northern Ireland
- Occupation: Engineer
- Height: 5 ft 11 in (180 cm)

Sport
- Sport: Gaelic football
- Position: Half forward
Club
- Years: Club
- 199x–present: Dungiven
Club titles
- Derry titles: 1
- Ulster titles: 1
Inter-county
- Years: County
- 1998–present: Derry
Inter-county titles
- Ulster titles: 1
- NFL: 1

Paul Murphy (born 20 September 1979) is a Gaelic footballer who plays for the Derry county team, with whom he has won one/two? National League titles.

Murphy plays his club football for St Canice's Dungiven and has won a Derry Senior Football Championship and Ulster Senior Club Football Championship with the club. He usually plays in the half forward line for Derry and midfield for Dungiven.

== Playing career ==
=== Inter-county ===
Murphy made his Derry debut in 1998. He was called up to the team again during the 2000/2001 National Football League.

He was part of the Derry team that won the 2008 National League where Derry beat Kerry in the final.

=== Club ===
Murphy and Dungiven won the Derry Senior Football Championship in 1997 and the club also went on to win that year's Ulster Senior Club Football Championship. They were defeated by Corofin of Galway in the All-Ireland Club Championship semi-final the following February.

== Honours ==
=== Inter-county ===
- National Football League:
  - Winner (at least 1): 2008
- Dr McKenna Cup:
  - Runner up: 2005, 2008, more?

=== Club ===
- Ulster Senior Club Football Championship:
  - Winner: 1997
- Derry Senior Football Championship:
  - Winner (1): 1997
- Derry Senior Football League:
  - Winner (1): 2003

Note: The above lists may be incomplete. Please add any other honours you know of.
