= Paul Cartin =

Derry Gaelic footballer

Personal information
- Native name: Pól Mac Artáin (Irish)
- Born: 20 March 1981 (age 45) Banagher, County Londonderry, Northern Ireland
- Occupation: Metal fixer
- Height: 6 ft 0 in (183 cm)

Sport
- Sport: Gaelic football
- Position: Half-back
Club
- Years: Club
- Banagher
Inter-county
- Years: County
- 2001–Present: Derry
Inter-county titles
- NFL: 1

Paul Cartin (born 20 March 1981) is a Gaelic footballer who plays for St Mary's Banagher and the Derry county team. With his county he has won a National League title. For both club and county Cartin usually plays in the half back line.

== Playing career ==
=== Inter-county ===
Cartin was first called up to the Derry Senior panel in late 2000 ahead of the 2000–2001 National Football League.

Cartin injured his knee in the first half of the 2007 Ulster Championship game against Antrim. An MRI scan revealed he had torn his cruciate ligament and he missed the rest of the Championship. The injury also effected the start of his 2008 season - missing the Dr McKenna Cup and the start of the National League. He did however recover to make the bench for the last few group games of the League plus the final, which Derry won, beating Kerry in the decider.

Cartin and Derry also reached the National League final in 2009, but were defeated by Kerry. He missed the final due to injury.

== Honours ==
=== Inter-county ===
- National Football League:
  - Winner (1): 2008
  - Runner-up: 2009

Note: The above lists may be incomplete. Please add any other honours you know of.
