= Chrissy McKaigue =

Irish hurler and Gaelic footballer

Personal information
- Born: 13 July 1989 (age 37) Derry, Northern Ireland
- Height: 1.87 m (6 ft 2 in)

Sport
- Sport: Gaelic football
- Position: Full Back
Club
- Years: Club
- 2006–present: Slaughtneil
Club titles
| | Football | Hurling |
| Derry titles | 5 | 13 |
| Ulster titles | 3 | 5 |
Inter-county
- Years: County
- 2008–2024: Derry
Inter-county titles
- Ulster titles: 2
- All-Irelands: 0
- NFL: 1
- All Stars: 1

Christopher McKaigue (born 13 July 1989) is an Irish Gaelic footballer who plays for the Derry county team.

McKaigue plays club football and hurling for Slaughtneil Robert Emmet's. He is a defender in football and a half forward in hurling.

He has represented Ireland in the International Rules Series.

== Personal life ==
McKaigue is from Slaughtneil. He went to secondary school at St Patrick's College, Maghera. McKaigue also worked Gaelcholáiste Dhoire as a Physical Education teacher and is a Gaeilge learner.

== Football career ==
=== Club ===
McKaigue has won numerous senior titles in both codes with Slaughtneil.

In hurling he has won the Derry Senior Hurling Championship nine times and the Ulster Senior Club Hurling Championship four times.

In football he is the holder of five Derry Senior Football Championships and three Ulster Senior Club Football Championships.

=== Inter-county ===
==== Minor ====
McKaigue was vice-captain of the Derry Minor team that were runners-up in both the Ulster Minor Championship and All-Ireland Minor Championship in 2007. Earlier that year he won the Ulster Minor Football League with the county, and lifted the cup as captain.

==== Under-21 ====
In 2008 McKaigue reached the Ulster Under 21 Championship final with Derry Under 21s, but they were beaten by Down due to a late goal.

==== Senior ====
2008–2009

Later in 2008 he was drafted into the Derry Senior panel before the Championship meeting with Monaghan. He came on as a substitute in that game to make his Derry Senior debut and scored a point. He was involved from the start of the 2009 season - named in the Dr McKenna Cup, National League and Championship panels. Derry reached that year's National League final, but were defeated by Kerry.

2022

In 2022, he won his first Ulster Senior Football Championship and Derry's first since 1998. They went on to reach the All-Ireland semi final that year, losing out to Galway. McKaigue, aged 33, won an All Star, becoming one of the oldest first time winners of that award.

=== International rules ===
He played twice for Ireland against Australia in the 2013 International Rules Series. He also played in the 2014 International Rules Series.

== Australian rules football career ==
Chrissy McKaigue

Personal information
- Full name: Christopher McKaigue
- Born: 13 July 1989 (age 37)
- Original team: Slaughtneil (club)/Derry (county team)
- Draft: No. 63, 2010 Rookie Draft, Sydney
- Height: 187 cm (74 in)
- Weight: 84 kg (185 lb)
- Position: Defender

In September 2009, it was announced that Australian Football League side Sydney Swans had signed McKaigue as an international rookie. It was anticipated he would play as an attacking defender.

== Honours ==
Slaughtneil

- Ulster Senior Club Football Championship (3): 2014, 2016, 2017
- Ulster Senior Club Hurling Championship (5): 2016, 2017, 2019, 2021, 2025
- Derry Senior Football Championship (5): 2014, 2015, 2016, 2017, 2020
- Derry Senior Hurling Championship (13): 2013, 2014, 2015, 2016, 2017, 2018, 2019, 2020, 2021, 2022, 2023, 2025, 2026

Derry

- Nicky Rackard Cup (1): 2017
- Ulster Senior Football Championship (2): 2022, 2023
- National football league (1): 2024

Individual

- Club Hurling Team of the Year (1): 2020
- Club Football Team of the Year (1): 2018
- All Star (1): 2022

Sporting positions
| Preceded by Enda Lynn | Derry Senior Football Captain; 2019–2022 | Succeeded by Conor Glass |
