= Seán Marty Lockhart =

Dual player of Gaelic games

Seán Marty Lockhart (born Seán Martin Lockhart)
Personal information
- Nickname: Rivaldo
- Born: 22 August 1976 (age 50) Banagher, Northern Ireland
- Occupation: Teacher
- Height: 6 ft 0 in (183 cm)

Sport
- Football Position: Corner back
- Hurling Position: Midfield
Club
- Years: Club
- 1992–: Banagher
Club titles
	Football	Hurling
Derry titles	0	1
Inter-county*
Years	County	Apps (scores)
1995–2009 ?–?	Derry (F); Derry (H)	50
Inter-county titles
	Football	Hurling
Ulster Titles	1	1 (as a sub)
All-Stars	1	0
- *Inter County team apps and scores correct as of 14:55, 17 May 2008 (UTC).

Seán Marty Lockhart (born Seán Martin Lockhart; 22 August 1976) is an Irish dual player of Gaelic games who plays Gaelic football for the Derry county team. He has won an Ulster Senior Football Championship and three National League titles with the county, as well an All-Ireland Under 21 Championship. He also won an All Star for his performances in the 1998 All-Ireland Senior Football Championship. He plays club football for St Mary's Banagher. As a dual player, Lockhart also plays hurling for Banagher, and has in the past also hurled for Derry.

In football, Lockhart is seen as a mobile, very tight marking corner-back, who is also very competent with the ball in his hands going forward, proven by the fact he plays midfield for his club. He won three Irish News Ulster All-Star awards (1998, 1999 and 2001) and was named left-corner back on the Irish News Team of the Decade in 2004. Lockhart holds the record for the highest number of appearances in the International Rules Series, having represented Ireland sixteen times over the course of eight series (1998–2006).

== Personal life ==
Lockhart and his wife, Miriam, are both teachers. The couple has three children. He teaches physical education (PE) and Geography, and is a class tutor, at St Patrick's College, Maghera.

== Football career ==
=== Inter-county ===
Lockhart reached the Ulster Under-21 Football Championship final with Derry Under-21s in 1996, but were defeated by Cavan.

In 1997 Lockhart and Derry won the Ulster Under-21 and All-Ireland Under-21 Football Championships, defeating Fermanagh and Meath in the respective finals. He was already playing for Derry's Senior team, having made his debut in October 1995 in a National League encounter against Kerry. Derry went on to win the 1995/1996 National League with Lockhart playing left half forward in the final against Donegal. He made his Championship debut against Armagh that year.

Lockhart and Derry finished runners-up to Offaly in the 1998 National League decider. Later that year he won the Ulster Senior Championship with Derry, with Lockhart's performance in the Ulster final was described as "outstanding". Derry lost to Galway in the All-Ireland Championship semi-final. He was named full back on the 1998 All-Star team and awarded Footballer of the Year by the Ulster GAA Writers Association.

Lockhart won another National League medal in 2000, playing in his more familiar position in the full back line. He was nominated in 2000 for an All Star, but narrowly missed out. 2001 saw Derry reach the All-Ireland semi-final again and Lockhart was again nominated for an All Star. He was awarded the Ulster Tennent's Monthly Merit Award for May 2003, for his two performances against Tyrone that month. He kept six-time All Star Peter Canavan scoreless from play in both the drawn game and replay. Derry reached the All-Ireland semi-final again in 2004, but were defeated by Kerry.

He was part of the Derry team that won the 2008 National League where Derry beat Kerry in the final. He was injured for the duration of the 2008 Championship.

=== Club ===
Lockhart plays for Banagher. He has represented St Brendan's GFC Chicago in Chicago, and in 2003 after a replay they finished runners-up to Wolfe Tones GFC in the Chicago Senior Football Championship final.

=== International ===
Lockhart played for Ireland in every game since the resumption of the International Rules Series in 1998 until 2006 (except for the 2002 series when he had a broken arm). Of the 16 games he played for Ireland, he was on the winning side eight times, with one draw. During the eight series, Ireland won four of them. In 1998 he was chosen as Irish Player of the Series and in 2004 he was chosen on the Supreme team to mark 20 years of Ireland versus Australia International Rules tests. It has been said part of the reason for him excelling in International Rules is that his fitness levels are as high as the professional Australian Rules athletes. He was selected as a runner for the Irish team for the 2008 Series, with selector Anthony Tohill citing his experience as being helpful. Although his official role was the runner, he "had a significant involvement in coaching the Irish squad". He also took an active part in training, and was impressive, and was on ready to come into the team if the Irish squad suffered a few injuries.

=== School/college ===
Lockhart was captain of the St Patrick's College, Maghera side that won the 1995 MacRory Cup, playing centre half back. He could not go on to compete in the Hogan Cup for the school, as he was nine days over the age limit. For his performances that year he became the first player to win both Ulster Colleges Football and Hurling All Stars. He teaches P.E and Geography at the school, he is also a form tutor to class 8SL1 in year 8 and has managed and trained a number of teams at the school. For example, he, with Martin McConnell and John Downey managed the St. Pat's second year team to success in the 2007 D'Alton Cup. Along with McConnell, he is in charge of the 2009 MacRory side.

== Hurling career ==
=== Inter-county ===
Lockhart was part of the Derry Under-21 side that won the 1997 Ulster Under-21 Hurling Championship. He hurled for the Derry Senior team in the past.

== Honours ==
=== Country ===
- 4 International Rules Series 1998, 1999, 2001, 2004

=== Inter-county ===
Senior

- 3 National Football League 1996 2000 2008
- 1 Ulster Senior Football Championship 1998
- 1 Dr McKenna Cup 1999
- 1 Ulster Senior Hurling Championship 2001 (Sub)

Under-21

- 1 All-Ireland Under-21 Football Championship 1997
- 1 Ulster Under-21 Football Championship 1997
- 1 Ulster Under-21 Hurling Championship 1997

=== Club ===
- 1 Derry Senior Hurling Championship 2005
- 2 Derry Intermediate Football Championship 1996 2002

=== Province ===
- Railway Cup - Winner (1): 2000

=== College ===
- 1 Hogan Cup1995
- 2 MacRory Cup 1994 1995

=== Individual ===
- 1 All Star 1998
- Irish News Ulster All Stars Team of the Decade (1995–2004)
- 3 Irish News Ulster GAA All-Stars Awards 1998 1999 2001
- 1 Ulster GAA Writers Association Footballer of the Year 1998
- 1 Ulster Tennent's Merit Award May 2003
- 1 Ulster Colleges Football All-Star 1995
- 1 Ulster Colleges Hurling All-Star 1995
- 1 Derry Senior football captain 2004
- Supreme International Rules Team (Special 20th anniversary team)
- Irish Player of the Series (International Rules) – Winner (at least once): 1998
- Represented Ireland 16 times in the International Rules Series

Note: The above lists may be incomplete. Please add any other honours you know of.

Gaelic games
Preceded by Enda Muldoon	Derry senior football captain 2004	Succeeded by Paddy Bradley
