= Joe Diver =

Derry Gaelic footballer

Personal information
- Native name: Seosamh Ó Duibhir (Irish)
- Born: Bellaghy, County Londonderry, Northern Ireland
- Occupation: Marketing executive
- Height: 6 ft 5 in (196 cm)

Sport
- Sport: Gaelic football
- Position: Midfield
Club
- Years: Club
- Bellaghy
Club titles
- Derry titles: 3
- Ulster titles: 1
Inter-county
- Years: County
- 2006–: Derry
Inter-county titles
- NFL: 1
- All Stars: 1

Joe Diver is a Gaelic footballer who plays for the Derry county team, with whom he has won a National League title. Diver plays his club football for Bellaghy Wolfe Tones, and won the Derry Senior Football Championship with the club.

For both club and county Diver usually plays in midfield. He has also played in the half forward line on occasion.

== Playing career ==
=== Inter-county ===
In 2000, when Derry won the Ulster Minor Championship, Diver made a late substitute appearance in the All-Ireland Minor semi-final against Cork. That game was shrouded in controversy, because a Cork player who was sent-off did not leave the field of play. Diver did not play Under 21 football with Derry as he was traveling in the United States.

Diver was first called up to the Derry Senior football panel in November 2005 for the 2006 season by Paddy Crozier. He made his competitive Derry debut on 8 January 2006 against Monaghan in that year's Dr McKenna Cup. His Championship debut came that year in a six-point victory over Tyrone at the age of 24.

He was part of the Derry team that won the 2008 National League where Derry beat Kerry in the final.

Diver played at midfield on the Derry team that reached the 2011 Ulster Senior championship final, and was made Vice Captain of Derry for 2012 season.

=== Club ===
In 2005 he won the Derry Championship with Bellaghy and helped the club reach the Ulster Senior Club Football Championship final, in which they were defeated by St. Gall's.

While in America, he helped the Derry club side win the 2003 New York Junior Football Championship.

== Honours ==
=== Inter-county ===
- 1 National Football League 2008
- 1 Dr McKenna Cup 2011
- 1 Ulster Minor Football Championship 2000

=== Club ===
- Ulster Senior Club Football Championship: Runner up: 2005
- Derry Senior Football Championship: Winner: 2005. Runner up: 2004, 2007
- Derry Senior Football League: Winner: 2004
- New York Junior Football Championship: Winner: 2003
