= Patsy Bradley =

Derry Gaelic footballer

Personal information
- Native name: Pádraig Ó Brolcháin (Irish)
- Born: Derry, Northern Ireland
- Height: 2.5 m (8 ft 2 in)

Sport
- Sport: Gaelic football
- Position: Midfield
Club
- Years: Club
- 2002–: Slaughtneil
Club titles
	Football	Hurling
Derry titles	3	
Ulster titles	2	
Inter-county
- Years: County
- Derry
Inter-county titles
- NFL: 1

Patsy Bradley is a Gaelic footballer who plays for the Robert Emmet's Slaughtneil club and the Derry county team. He has won a National League title with his county and the Derry Senior Football Championship with his club. For both club and county Bradley usually plays in midfield.

== Playing career ==
=== Inter-county ===
Bradley was part of the Derry Minor side that won the 2002 Ulster Minor and All-Ireland Minor Championships. He was a member of the Derry Under 21 team that finished runners-up in the 2004 Ulster Under 21 Championship.

He was part of the Derry Senior panel that won the 2008 National League where Derry beat Kerry in the final.

=== Club ===
In 2004 Bradley was part of the first Slaughtneil side to win the Derry Senior Football Championship, defeating Bellaghy in the final. Slaughtneil reached the final again in 2008, but were beaten by Ballinderry Shamrocks. In 2014 Bradley was part of the Slaughtneil side who won both the Derry Senior Football Championship and the Ulster Senior Club Football Championship. He helped Slaughtneil repeat this achievement again in 2016 in a tight contest against Kilcoo from Down.

== Honours ==
Derry

- National Football League (1): 2008
- All-Ireland Minor Football Championship (1): 2002
- Ulster Minor Football Championship (1): 2002

Slaughtneil

- Ulster Senior Club Football Championship (2): 2014, 2016
- Derry Senior Football Championship (3): 2004, 2014, 2016
