= Enda Muldoon =

Gaelic footballer (born 1977)

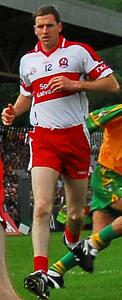

Personal information
- Nicknames: Archie, Big Enda, Big E
- Born: 11 September 1977 (age 49) Ardboe, Northern Ireland
- Occupation: Sports coach
- Height: 6 ft 4 in (193 cm)

Sport
- Sport: Gaelic football
- Position: Forward
Clubs
- Years: Club
- 1995–2017 2002: Ballinderry; Westmeath (New York)
Club titles
- Derry titles: 6
- Ulster titles: 2
- All-Ireland Titles: 1
Inter-county*
Years	County	Apps (scores)
1997–2012	Derry	45
Inter-county titles
- Ulster titles: 1
- NFL: 2
- All Stars: 1
- *Inter County team apps and scores correct as of 10:38, 2 September 2008 (UTC); Includes Championship games only.

Enda Muldoon (born 11 September 1977) is a former Gaelic footballer who played for the Derry county team and has won an Ulster Senior Football Championship and two National League titles with the county, as well as Ulster Minor, Ulster Under 21 and All-Ireland Under-21 Football Championships. He also won an All Star Award for his performances in the 2004 All-Ireland Senior Football Championship.

From Ballinderry, County Tyrone, Northern Ireland, Muldoon announced his retirement from playing club football for Ballinderry Shamrocks on 13 November 2017. He was instrumental in helping Ballinderry win the 2002 All-Ireland Senior Club Football Championship, and he has also won six Derry Championships and an Ulster Senior Club Football Championship with the club.

Muldoon was a versatile player who could play anywhere in the forward line or in midfield. Described by Joe Brolly as "the greatest ever natural talent to have played with Derry", his repertoire of skills include his catching ability, scoring prowess, confidence on the ball, positional awareness and in particular his great passing capabilities.

Despite often playing in the half-forward line or midfield, Muldoon has consistently been a high scorer for Derry. He finished the 2001 All-Ireland Senior Football Championship with 2–10 (16) and the 2004 Championship with 3–24 (33). He finished the 2006 campaign with 1-07 (10) from two matches. His tally of 12 Championship goals is one of the highest ever in Ulster football history.

== Football career ==
=== Playing style ===
Described as "one of the most talented footballers of his generation", Enda Muldoon has played in virtually all positions in the forward line, as well as midfield for both his club and county. He is regarded as the complete footballer in that he has impressive high-fielding skills, is hard to dispossess, is very accurate in front of the posts with both feet and covers a lot of ground often tracking back to help in defence. Muldoon has been praised for his vision and ability to pick out pin-point passes, and he is also regarded as a great reader of the game. Ballinderry and Derry teammate Kevin McGuckin described him as "a magician on the ball and can do anything with it or put it anywhere with his passing". GAA journalist and former Derry player Joe Brolly said of him: "I cannot say I have ever seen a more elegant footballer" and compared him to Kerry football legend Maurice Fitzgerald.

=== Inter-county ===
In 1995, his last year of eligibility, Muldoon was brought into the Derry Minor panel. He was part of the team that won the 1995 Ulster Minor Championship and finished runners-up to Westmeath in that year's All-Ireland Minor final. He was instrumental in Derry's run in that Minor Championship, including scoring 1–07 (10) against Down in the Ulster final and scoring a dramatic last minute goal which helped Derry beat Galway by a point in the All-Ireland semi-final.

Muldoon reached the Ulster Under-21 Football Championship final with Derry Under-21s in 1996, but were defeated by Cavan. In 1997 Muldoon and Derry won the Ulster Under-21 and All-Ireland Under-21 Football Championships, defeating Fermanagh and Meath in the respective finals. Muldoon was also on the team the following year, but Derry were defeated at the Ulster final stage by Armagh.

He made his Derry Senior debut in the 1997 season and reached the Ulster final, where they were beat by Cavan. In 1998, playing in midfield he won the Ulster Senior Championship with Derry. It was his sixth Ulster final in four years—one Minor, three Under-21 and two Senior. Derry lost out to Galway in that year's All-Ireland Championship semi-final. In 2000 he won the National League with Derry, defeating Meath in the final. Derry also reached that year's Ulster final, but lost out to Armagh. He was nominated in 2000 for an All Star, but narrowly missed out. He was however an All Star replacement for the All Star trip to Dubai in January 2001.

Derry lost at the semi-final stage of the 2001 Ulster Championship, but nonetheless reached the All-Ireland semi-final through the qualifiers, where they once again faced Galway. Derry again lost to Galway, despite a goal scored by Muldoon. Muldoon scored 2–10 (16) in that year's Championship. Muldoon was named Derry captain for the 2003 season.

In 2004 Muldoon and Paddy Bradley formed a clinical scoring partnership en route to the All-Ireland semi-final, where they eventually lost to Kerry. Muldoon contributed 3–24 (33) of Derry's total of 7–92 (113) in the 2004 All-Ireland Championship, including a goal in the semi-final and 1-06 (9) in the quarter-final in a man of the match performance against Westmeath. He was named full forward on the 2004 All-Star team for his performances the Championship.

Muldoon had an injury called patellar tendinitis in both his knees. In December 2004, he underwent surgery on one of his knees. The operation was successful and he resumed training in April 2005. Muldoon started the 2006 Ulster Championship campaign very brightly scoring 1–03 (6) in the first round of the Ulster Championship against defending All-Ireland Champions Tyrone and 0–04 against Donegal. However Muldoon, with a previously exemplary disciplinary record at all levels, was red-carded late in that game. Some commentators called for Muldoon's red card to be rescinded after television replays showed he was reacting to "extreme provocation" from Donegal full back Paddy Campbell, who had punched Muldoon in the groin. Muldoon however received a four-week suspension and missed Derry's next two games against Kildare and Longford. Longford produced a shock victory to knock Derry out of the 2006 Championship. He finished the 2006 campaign with 1-07 (10) from two matches.

Muldoon put in some impressive performances in Derry's run to the 2007 All-Ireland quarter-final, where they lost out to Dublin. He was awarded the Ulster Tennent's Monthly Merit Award for July 2007, for his performances against Mayo and Laois that month, including a lobbed goal against Mayo. This was the second time he had received the accolade. He was instrumental in the 2008 National League, which Derry won, defeating Kerry in the final. Joe Brolly described him as "the best player on the field". The league success saw Derry become favourites to win the Ulster Championship and one of the top few for the All-Ireland. However, despite a good opening victory against Donegal, Derry exited the Ulster Championship against Fermanagh at the semi-final stage and were defeated by Monaghan in the first round of the Qualifiers.

Muldoon and Derry also reached the National League final in 2009, but were defeated by Kerry. He missed the final due to injury. Muldoon won a second McKenna Cup medal with Derry in 2011. They also reached that year's Ulster final but lost to Donegal.

=== Club ===
Muldoon won his first Derry Senior Football Championship medal while still a minor in 1995, when Ballinderry defeated Bellaghy in the final. In 1998 Muldoon was part of the Ballinderry team that won the All-Ireland Kilmacud Crokes Sevens Championship.

After losing two finals in a row to Bellaghy in 1999 and 2000, Ballinderry won the 2001 Derry Championship, once again defeating Bellaghy in the decider. The club went on to win the 2001 Ulster Club Championship with victories over St. Gall's in the quarter-final (after a replay), Cavan Gaels in the semi-final and Mayobridge in the final. Muldoon was awarded Ulster Football Award Winner at the AIB GAA Provincial Player Awards 2001 for his role in Ballinderry's march to claim the Ulster Club Championship. He was presented his award by GAA President Seán McCague. Ballinderry went on to represent Ulster in the All-Ireland Senior Club Football Championship, which they won defeating Tír Chonaill Gaels (London) in the quarter-final, Rathnew (Wicklow) in the semi-final and Nemo Rangers (Cork) in the final. Muldoon played through the pain barrier in the Championship, delaying an operation on a troublesome hip injury until after the All-Ireland final.

Ballinderry defended the Derry Championship in 2002, but lost in the semi-final stage of the Ulster Club Championship to Errigal Ciarán. Muldoon won the Ulster Tennent's Monthly Merit Award for October 2002 for his performance against Mayobridge in the Ulster Club quarter-final. His performance in that game was described as a "masterful display", scoring vital points and was the "defensive anchor in a tense final quarter". Muldoon also helped New York club Westmeath reach the semi-final of the New York Senior Football Championship in 2002, but they were defeated by the Kerry club.

Muldoon was runner-up for the third time in the Derry Championship in 2003, losing to local rivals An Lúb in the final. He gained his fourth Derry Championship medal in 2006 with the club, avenging the 2003 loss to An Lúb, with Muldoon having an "impressive game". Ballinderry reached the 2006 Ulster Club final, but lost narrowly to Crossmaglen Rangers. In 2008 Muldoon and Ballinderry won the Ulster Senior Club Football League. Muldoon won his fifth Derry Championship medal in 2008, this time as captain. An achilles injury forced him to miss the quarter-final tie with Bellaghy and he was only fit enough to come on as a substitute in the semi-final clash with Dungiven. However he recovered in time for the final, and his performance, particularly in the second half, proved vital in helping the club defeat Slaughtneil. Ballinderry got to the 2008 Ulster Club final and again faced Crossmaglen. Muldoon put in a brilliant performance in the game, which finished a draw. He broke a bone in his foot two days before the replay and could not play. His absence proved costly and Cross won the replay.

Coleraine defeated Ballinderry in the 2010 Derry Championship final, but Muldoon won his sixth county medal in 2011 with victory over Kilrea in the final. The Shamroks also won the 2010 and 2011 Ulster League titles. He has also won eight Derry Senior League medals with the club (1995, 1996, 1997, 2005, 2006, 2007, 2008 and 2010).

=== Province ===
Muldoon has played for Ulster many times. He was part of the panel in 2000, that won the Railway Cup, but could not play due to an injury picked up in training. He also won the competition with the province in 2003, 2004 and 2007.

== Honours ==
=== County ===
==== Senior ====
- National Football League:
  - Winner (2): 2000, 2008
  - Runner-up: 1998, 2009
- Ulster Senior Football Championship:
  - Winner (1): 1998
  - Runner up: 1997, 2000, 2011
- Dr McKenna Cup:
  - Winner (1): 1999, 2011
  - Runner up: 2008, more?

==== Under-21 ====
- All-Ireland Under-21 Football Championship:
  - Winner (1): 1997
- Ulster Under-21 Football Championship:
  - Winner (1): 1997
  - Runner up: 1996, 1998

==== Minor ====
- All-Ireland Minor Football Championship:
  - Runner up: 1995
- Ulster Minor Football Championship:
  - Winner (1): 1995

=== Club ===
- All-Ireland Senior Club Football Championship:
  - Winner (1): 2002
- All-Ireland Kilmacud Crokes Sevens Championship:
  - Winner (1): 1998
- Ulster Senior Club Football Championship:
  - Winner (1): 2001
  - Runner up: 2006, 2008
- Ulster Senior Club Football League:
  - Winner (3): 2008, 2010, 2011
- Derry Senior Football Championship:
  - Winner (8): 1995, 2001, 2002, 2006, 2008, 2011, 2012, 2013
  - Runner up: 1999, 2000, 2003, 2010
- Derry Senior Football League:
  - Winner (8): 1995, 1996, 1997, 2005, 2006, 2007, 2008, 2010
- Numerous underage awards including U-12 and U-14 Derry Championships

=== Province ===
- Railway Cup:
  - Winner (at least 3): 2000?, 2003, 2004, 2007

=== Individual ===
- All Star:
  - Winner (1): 2004
  - Nominated (runner up): 2000
- Irish News Ulster GAA All Star – Winner (4): 2000, 2001, 2004, 2007
- Ulster Tennent's Merit Award – Winner (2): October 2002, July 2007
- AIB GAA Provincial Player Awards – Ulster Football Award – Winner (1): 2001
- Derry Senior football captain: 2003
- Derry Senior Football Championship winning captain: 2008

Gaelic games
Preceded by Anthony Tohill	Derry senior football captain 2003	Succeeded by Seán Marty Lockhart
Preceded by Paddy Bradley (Glenullin)	Derry Senior Football Championship winning captain 2008	Succeeded by Incumbent
