= Barry Gillis =

Derry Gaelic football goalkeeper

Personal information
- Born: 12 January 1980 (age 46) Magherafelt, County Londonderry, Northern Ireland
- Occupations: Service engineer postman, car wash owner and a postman working from Magherafelt
- Height: 6 ft 1 in (185 cm)

Sport
- Sport: Gaelic football
- Position: Goalkeeper
Club
- Years: Club
- Magherafelt
Inter-county
- Years: County
- 199x–: Derry
Inter-county titles
- NFL: 2

Barry Gillis (born 12 January 1980) is a Gaelic footballer who plays for the Derry county team, with whom he has won the National League twice. He plays his club football for Magherafelt O'Donovan Rossa.

Gillis plays full forward for Magherafelt, but plays as goalkeeper for Derry. He is in the unique position of winning a National League medal as an outfielder (2000), and another National League medal as goalkeeper (2008).

== Playing career ==
=== Inter-county ===
Gillis was originally called up to the Derry panel as an outfielder in the late 1990s and was on the panel for Derry's 2000 National League success. Gillis was part of the panel when Derry reached that year's Ulster Senior Football Championship final, but were defeated by Armagh. He pulled out of the panel for a couple of seasons in the 2000s as he was working in Dublin, but returned again.

He was part of the Derry team that won the 2008 National League where Derry beat Kerry in the final.

== Honours ==
=== County ===
- National Football League:
  - Winner (2): 2000, 2008
- Ulster Senior Football Championship:
  - Runner up: 2000
- Dr McKenna Cup:
  - Runner up: 2005, 2008, more?

Note: The above lists may be incomplete. Please add any other honours you know of.
