= Gerard O'Kane =

Derry Gaelic footballer

Personal information
- Born: 5 October 1984 (age 42) Ballymoney, County Antrim
- Height: 1.78 m (5 ft 10 in)

Sport
- Sport: Gaelic football
- Position: Centre Back
Club
- Years: Club
- 2001–: Glenullin
Club titles
- Derry titles: 1
College
- Years: College
- Queen's University Belfast
College titles
- Sigerson titles: 1
Inter-county
- Years: County
- 2005–: Derry
Inter-county titles
- Ulster titles: 0
- All-Irelands: 0
- NFL: 1
- All Stars: 0

Gerard O'Kane (born 5 October 1984) is a Gaelic footballer who plays for the Derry county team, with whom he has won a National League title.

He plays his club football for John Mitchel's Glenullin and has won a Derry Senior Football Championship with the club. He plays in the half back line for club and county, with his pace and stamina being two of his key attributes.

== Early life and family ==
O'Kane was born in Philadelphia PA but now lives in Glenullin near Garvagh. He is a cousin of fellow Derry and Glenullin players Paddy and Eoin Bradley. The Bradleys' father, Liam (former Antrim manager) is an uncle of O'Kane. O'Kane's father, also called Gerard, has served as chairman of the Derry County Board in the past.

== Playing career ==
=== Club ===
O'Kane plays club football for John Mitchel's Glenullin. O'Kane won the Derry Senior Football Championship with the club in the Derry Senior Football Championship of 2007. Glenullin met Bellaghy in the final, and, after a replay, won the title. He won the man of the match award for his performance in the final replay.

Earlier that year Glenullin won the Ulster Senior Club Football League, beating Latton of Monaghan in the final. The club reached the Ulster League final again the following year, but were defeated by fellow Derry club Ballinderry.

In 2008 the club reached the final of the All-Ireland Sevens Championship, organised by Kilmacud Crokes, but lost 1-11 to 0-13 to St. Gall's, Antrim in the decider, with O'Kane scoring 0-01 in the match. He was Glenullin's goalkeeper during the tournament (often outfielders are used as goalkeepers in sevens football). Glenullin, jointly with Ballinderry, won the 2008 Derry Senior Football League.

=== Inter-county ===
O'Kane captained the Derry Minor side that won the 2002 Ulster Minor Championship and All-Ireland Minor Championship.

He made his Derry Senior debut in 2004. He was part of the Derry team that won the 2008 National League where Derry beat Kerry in the final.

O'Kane and Derry again reached the National League final in 2009, but were defeated by Kerry. Derry opened their 2009 Championship campaign with a win over Monaghan. However, they were defeated in the next round (Ulster semi-final) by Tyrone. They were drawn against Monaghan again in the first round of the Qualifiers and defeated them for the second time that year. Derry's 2009 campaign ended the following week with defeat to Donegal.

=== School/college ===
Gerard O'Kane captained St Pat's, Maghera, to success in the 2003 MacRory Cup and Hogan Cup. These successes came months after winning the All-Ireland Minor title with Derry, becoming the first player since 1949 to captain a winning Hogan Cup team the year after captaining a victorious All-Ireland Minor side. He was awarded Ulster Colleges Football All-Stars in both 2002 and 2003. In 2007 he won the Ryan Cup and Sigerson Cup with Queen's University Belfast. In 2005 and 2007 he was voted onto the Datapac Combined Universities (All Star) team.

== Honours ==
=== Inter-county ===
- Ulster Minor Football Championship (1): 2002
- All-Ireland Minor Football Championship (1): 2002
- National Football League (1): 2008

=== Club ===
- Ulster Senior Club Football League (1): 2007
- Derry Senior Football Championship (1): 2007
- Derry Senior Football League (1): 2008

=== College ===
- MacRory Cup (1): 2003
- Hogan Cup (1): 2003
- Ryan Cup (1): 2007
- Sigerson Cup (1): 2007

=== Individual ===
- Captain Derry minor Ulster and All-Ireland winning side: 2002
- Captain St. Pat's MacRory Cup and Hogan Cup winning side: 2003
- Ulster Colleges Football All-Star - Winner (2): 2002, 2003
- Datapac Combined Universities - Winner (2): 2005, 2007
- Irish News All Star 2009

Note: The above lists may be incomplete. Please add any other honours you know of.
