= Kevin McCloy =

Irish Gaelic footballer

Personal information
- Born: 26 October 1978 (age 48) Lavey, Derry, Ireland
- Occupation: Civil engineer
- Height: 6 ft 2 in (188 cm)

Sport
- Football Position: Full back
- Hurling Position: Midfield
Club
- Years: Club
- 199–present: Lavey
Club titles
	Football	Hurling
Derry titles	0	5
Inter-county
- Years: County
- 2001–2012 ?–2000: Derry (F); Derry (H)
Inter-county titles
	Football	Hurling
Ulster Titles	0	1
All-Ireland Titles	0	0
League titles	1	0
All-Stars	1	0

Kevin McCloy (born 26 October 1978) is a dual player of Gaelic games who plays Gaelic football for the Derry county team, with whom he has won a National League title. He also won an All Star for his performances in the 2007 All-Ireland Senior Football Championship. McCloy plays his club football for Erin's Own's Lavey.

As a dual player, he also plays hurling for Lavey, and has in the past also hurled for Derry - winning an Ulster Senior Hurling Championship medal. He is well known for wearing his candystriped stockings above knee level.

In football, he is seen as a tough, old-fashioned full back, who is also very competent with the ball in his hands going forward and a good reader of the game. Although full back is his usual position, he has said he prefers to play at centre half back and has done so on occasion for Derry and Lavey.

== Football career ==
=== Inter-county ===
McCloy matured late in football terms and he never played at Minor or Under 21 level for Derry. He joined the Senior team during the 2000/2001 National Football League and made his Championship debut in 2001 against Antrim.

McCloy missed the 2004 Championship through injury, but had an exceptional year in 2005. He was nominated for an All Star.

McCloy had another impressive season in 2007. Regular captain Kevin McGuckin got injured in the latter stages of the National League and McCloy became stand-in captain on the field of play that summer until McGuckin's return. After being knocked out of the Ulster Championship by Monaghan at the semi-final stage, Derry advanced through the qualifiers with victories over Armagh, Mayo and Laois. Against Mayo McCloy shattered his little finger in three places while getting an accidental kick from Conor Mortimer. He displaced the bones so bad that they were pushed up beyond his knuckle. He played on and played against Laois two weeks later. Derry were paired with Dublin in the All-Ireland quarter-final. Nine days before the tie McCloy had an operation on the finger. The surgeon told him not to play contact sport for 10 weeks and if he did he would risk never having the full use of his finger again. He contacted 10 doctors to see if any would administer a painkilling injection, but they all refused. McCloy played the game and despite finishing on the losing side in a tight encounter, McCloy was awarded man of the match. On 19 October 2007 McCloy was named at full back on the 2007 All Star team. The award is the fifth All Star from the Lavey club, following in the footsteps of Anthony McGurk (twice), Johnny McGurk and Henry Downey.

McCloy was named new Derry captain for the 2008 season. During the match against Dublin the previous year, he hit Mark Vaughan with a great shoulder tackle, however the tackle left McCloy with whiplash, hurting his other shoulder and also giving him groin problems which limited his appearances in the 2008 National League. The start of McCloy's 2008 season was an injury hit one - making just two substitute appearance in the Dr. McKenna Cup. He played seven games in the 2008 National League, three coming as a substitute. One of these substitute appearances came in the final, where he broke down injured in the warm-up, but came on later in the game. Derry defeated Kerry in the final. The league success saw Derry become favourites to win the Ulster Championship and one of the top few for the All-Ireland. However, despite a good opening victory against Donegal, Derry exited the Ulster Championship against Fermanagh at the semi-final stage and were defeated by Monaghan in the first round of the Qualifiers.

=== Province ===
McCloy was part of Ulster's 2007 Railway Cup winning team.

=== International Rules ===
McCloy was asked to attend trials for the Ireland team for the 2008 International Rules Series. He impressed initially and survived the initial cull of players from the squad, but did not make the final 27-man squad for the trip to Australia, and was instead named as one of six standby players.

== Hurling career ==
=== Inter-county ===
McCloy's first taste of inter-county action was with the Derry hurling team. McCloy won the 2000 Ulster Senior Hurling Championship with Derry, the county's first Ulster hurling title in 92 years. He left the hurling team when the footballers called him up the next season.

=== Club ===
With Lavey McCloy has won the Derry Senior Hurling Championship on 96 occasions.

== Honours ==
=== Inter-county ===
- National Football League:
  - Winner (1): 2008
- Ulster Senior Hurling Championship:
  - Winner (1): 2000
- Dr McKenna Cup:
  - Runner up: 2005, 2008, 2011

=== Club ===
- Derry Senior Hurling Championship:
  - Winner (?): Years?
- Ulster Minor Club Hurling Championship:
  - Winner (1): 199x
- Derry Minor Hurling Championship:
  - Winner (?): Years?

=== Province ===
- Railway Cup:
  - Winner (1): 2007

Gaelic games
Preceded by Kevin McGuckin	Derry senior football captain 2007	Succeeded by Incumbent
