= Fergal Doherty =

Derry Gaelic footballer

Personal information
- Nickname: Ferbie
- Born: 7 October 1981 (age 45) Bellaghy, County Londonderry, Northern Ireland
- Occupations: Roof, cladding contractor Part Half Owner Of Pats Bar Portglenone
- Height: 6 ft 1 in (185 cm)

Sport
- Sport: Gaelic football
- Position: Midfield
Club
- Years: Club
- Bellaghy
Club titles
- Derry titles: 2
- Ulster titles: 1
Inter-county*
Years	County	Apps (scores)
2001–2015	Derry	37
Inter-county titles
- NFL: 1
- *Inter County team apps and scores correct as of 23:14, 8 January 2009 (UTC); Includes Championship games only..

Fergal Doherty (born 7 October 1981) is a former Gaelic footballer who played for the Derry county team, with whom he won a National League title. He was nominated for an All Star four times but narrowly missed out on each occasion.

Doherty played his club football for Bellaghy Wolfe Tones. Doherty won the Derry Senior Football Championship twice with the club, as well as winning the 2000 Ulster Senior Club Football Championship.

For both club and county Doherty usually played in midfield. He was highly regarded for impressive high-fielding skills and work-rate, often helping in attack and also tracking back to help in defence. His ability to win breaking ball, read the game and plug gaps was impressive. Irish News journalist Paddy Heaney says of Doherty "The Bellaghy man does not seek headlines, just victories. He was at one point the Derry captain.

On 3 November 2022 Doherty appeared in court charged with manslaughter over the death of Aaron Law. Father of two Aaron Law, 34, was found lying unconscious on Main Street in the village of Portglenone in the early hours of 30 October 2022. He died later that day in Antrim Area Hospital

== Playing career ==
=== Inter-county ===
Doherty made his Championship debut as a 19-year-old against Antrim in 2001. That year he put in some impressive performances in Derry's run to the 2001 All-Ireland semi-final, where they lost out to Galway. He was awarded the Bass Ulster Monthly Merit Award for August 2001, for his performances against Tyrone and Galway that month. He along with brother Gareth was nominated for an All Star in 2001. Doherty was again nominated for All Stars in 2004 and 2007.

He had instrumental in the 2008 National League, which Derry won, defeating Kerry in the final. He scored a vital goal in the match and was awarded man of the match. He received the Vodafone All Stars Footballer of the Month award for April 2008 for key performances against Tyrone, Donegal and Kerry en route to Derry's National League success. Doherty was Derry's lone All Star nominee in 2008, his fourth in total.

He was appointed Derry captain for the 2009 season. Doherty and Derry again reached the National League final in 2009, but were defeated by Kerry.

He left the county panel for four years, returning in 2014 then retiring from inter-county football in 2015.

=== Club ===
Among his club awards Doherty has won the Derry Championship in 1999??, 2000 and 2005. In 2000 the club also went on to win the Ulster Senior Club Football Championship. He has also won the All-Ireland Kilmacud Sevens in 2002 and the 2002 Castlewellan Sevens with the club.

== Honours ==
=== Inter-county ===
- National Football League:
  - Winner (1): 2008
  - Runner-up: 2009
- Dr McKenna Cup:
  - Runner up: 2005, 2008, more?

=== Club ===
- All-Ireland Kilmacud Crokes Sevens Championship:
  - Winner (1): 2002
- Castlewellan Sevens:
  - Winner (at least 1): 2002, more?
  - Runner up: 2003
- Ulster Senior Club Football Championship:
  - Winner (1): 2000
  - Runner up: 2005
- Derry Senior Football Championship:
  - Winner (2?/3?): 1999??, 2000, 2005
  - Runner up: 2001, 2004, 2007
- Derry Senior Football League:
  - Winner (2/3/4??): 1998??, 1999??, 2000, 2004
- Underage competitions

=== Individual ===
- All Star:
  - Nominated (runner up): 2001, 2004, 2007, 2008
- Irish News Ulster GAA All-Star: – Winner (?): 2007, more?
- Ulster Tennent's Merit Award – Winner (1): August 2001
- National Football League Final man of the match: – 2008

Note: The above lists may be incomplete. Please add any other honours you know of.
