= Damian Cassidy =

Gaelic football

Personal information
- Nickname: Cass
- Born: 22 July 1965 (age 61) Bellaghy, County Londonderry, Northern Ireland
- Occupations: Social worker Pedigree dog breeder
- Height: 5 ft 9 in (175 cm)

Sport
- Sport: Gaelic football
- Position: Half forward
Clubs
- Years: Club
- 1982–1999 1992: Bellaghy; High Moss Sarsfields
Club titles
- Derry titles: 5
- Ulster titles: 1
Inter-county
- Years: County
- 1984–1996: Derry
Inter-county titles
- Ulster titles: 2
- All-Irelands: 1
- NFL: 3

Damian Cassidy (born 22 July 1965), is a Gaelic football manager and former player for the Derry county team in the 1980s and 1990s, who was part of the county's 1993 All-Ireland Championship winning side, starting at left half forward. He also won two Ulster Senior Championship medals, three National League titles, and a range of under-age inter-county medals with the county. Cassidy played his club football for Bellaghy Wolfe Tones and won five Derry Championships and the 1994 Ulster Senior Club Football Championships with the club. For both club and county he usually played as a forward.

Since retiring from playing football he has managed a number of teams. He guided home-club Bellaghy to success in the 2005 Derry Championship, and Tyrone club Clonoe O'Rahilly's to the Tyrone Championship in 2008. He was the manager of the Derry senior team from 2008 to 2010 and Under 21 teams. His brother Joe also played for Derry.

== Playing career ==
=== Style ===
Cassidy played the majority of his career in the forward line (corner-forward for Bellaghy and half-forward for Derry), but also had a spell in the half back line early in his career. Adrian McGuckin, who coached him at St Pat's, Maghera, said he had a superb left foot and was very comfortable on the ball. GAA journalist and former Derry team-mate Joe Brolly said that despite the presence of many other great footballers at the time, Cassidy at his peak "was easily the best club footballer in Derry".

=== Inter-county ===
Cassidy was part of the Derry Minor side that won the 1983 Ulster Minor and All-Ireland Minor Championships. Cassidy scored 2–3 (2 goals and 3 points—each goal equals 3 points; 2 × 3 + 3 = 9 points, see GAA scoring rules) in the Ulster minor final victory over Monaghan. He scored 0–4 from left half forward in the All-Ireland semi-final victory over Galway, before going on to defeat Cork in the decider, playing at left half forward. He also won back-to-back Ulster Under 21 Championships with the Derry Under 21 side in 1985 and 1986. In 1985 Derry Under 21s were defeated by Cork in the All Ireland Under 21 Championship final and by Cork in the 1986 All-Ireland semi-final.

He made his Derry Senior debut straight out of Minors the following year (1984) and was on the 1987 Ulster Senior Football Championship winning team, at right corner forward. The side defeated Armagh in the final. In 1992 Cassidy was part of the Derry panel that won the National League. It was 1992 until Cassidy and Derry got back to an Ulster final, however this time they were beat by Donegal. Derry however defeated Donegal in the 1993 Ulster decider and went on to win the 1993 All-Ireland Championship with a semi-final victory over Dublin and a final victory over Cork. The success was the county's first ever All-Ireland Senior Football Championship. Cassidy won further National League medals in 1995 and 1996.

=== Club ===
At underage level with Bellaghy he won Derry Under 16 (1981) and Derry Minor Championships. He made his Senior debut for the club in 1982. He won his first Derry Senior Football Championship medal with Bellaghy in 1986, with victory over Ballinderry in the final; Bellaghy also won the league that year. Despite Bellaghy not reaching the final, Cassidy was the Derry Championship's top-scorer in 1991, with a total haul of 4–6 (18 points). The club won the Derry Championship again in 1994, and also won that year's Ulster Senior Club Football Championship. The club went on to contest the 1995 All-Ireland Senior Club Football Championship final against Kilmacud Crokes of Dublin. Bellaghy were beat by three points and unfortunately for Cassidy he missed a vital penalty late in the match. Cassidy won further Derry Championship medals with the club in 1996, 1998 and 1999 —winning Derry league medals in the latter two years as well. Bellaghy were also Ulster Club runners-up in 1996 and 1998. He was awarded the man of the match accolade in both the 1994 and 1999 Derry Championship finals. Cassidy won player of the tournament in the All Ireland 7's hosted by Kilmacud in Dublin in 1996. He was also on the 7's team that won the All Ireland 7's in 1986. Cassidy won Player of the Tournament at the 1997 Castlewellan 7's, which Bellaghy won. Cassidy retired in 1999.

Cassidy was also a talented hurler.

=== School ===
Cassidy won three MacRory Cup medals in 1982, 1983 and 1984 whilst at St Patrick's College, Maghera (secondary school). He also played hurling for the college and won a Mageean Cup in 1984.

== Managerial career ==
Damian Cassidy
Sport
Club management
- Years: Club
- 2003 2004–2005 & 2007 2008, 2011–2017 2018: Loughmacrory; Bellaghy Wolfe Tones; Clonoe O'Rahilly's; Cargin Erin's Own
	1; 1; 1	– – –	– – –
Inter-county management
- Years: Team
- 2006 2009–2010: Cavan Coach; Derry; Derry Under 21s

=== Inter-county ===
Cassidy was Derry assistant manager to Eamonn Coleman from 2000 until 2002. Derry won the National League in 2000 and got to the All-Ireland semi-final in 2001. Following the resignation of Coleman in July 2002, Cassidy said he was not interested in becoming Derry manager. Mickey Moran in the end succeeded Coleman. In late 2002, Cassidy was linked with the vacant Antrim manager's job, but rejected it. The post eventually went to PJ O'Hare.

Following illness to then Cavan manager Eamonn Coleman before the start of the 2005 Championship, assistant Martin McElkennon became acting-manager and Cassidy became McElkennon's assistant. He described his position as a "consultancy role", but was assigned an assistant manager / coach's role the following year.

In 2008 he applied for the vacant Derry Senior football manager's job. Cassidy was announced as new Derry boss late on 7 October 2008. His backroom team will include former Antrim star Kevin Madden, as well as Martin McConnell, Brendan McCrory and goalkeeping coach Kevin O'Neill.

=== Club ===
He managed the Senior and Under-21 teams of St Teresa's Loughmacrory in 2003 and led the club to the Tyrone Under 21 Championship title.

Cassidy became Bellaghy manager for the 2004 season and managed them to the county final of 2004 where they lost to Slaughneil by 2 points. He also secured the league title in the same season. They captured 2005 Derry Championship title and they also reached the final of that year's Ulster Club Championship. Then reached the Derry final again in 2007 under his leadership, but lost by a point to Glenullin after a replay. He announced in December 2007 that he was stepping down as Bellaghy boss.

He was appointed manager of Tyrone club Clonoe O'Rahilly's in January 2008. He successfully guided the club to success in the 2008 Tyrone Championship, the club's first title since 1991. They shocked the "big two" of Tyrone club football – Errigal Ciarán and Carrickmore in the first round and quarter-final respectively. Clonoe then defeated Donaghmore to progress to their first Championship final in 17 years. They faced defending champions Dromore in the final, who went in as red-hot favourites. However, Clonoe beat Dromore by a point after extra time. The feat is all the more remarkable, considering Clonoe are a very young team and have no Tyrone county players on the team. They were however beaten by St Eunan's of Donegal in the quarter-final of the 2008 Ulster Club Championship. Cassidy was reappointed manager of Clonoe O'Rahilly's in 2011, where he guided them back into the Tyrone championship final against Dromore, a repeat of the 2008 final, this time Dromore got their revenge winning by a point. In 2012 he guided Clonoe to their first All County Senior League title, defeating Coalisland in the final. In 2013 he once more lead Clonoe O' Rahilly's to senior championship success, beating Carrickmore in the final. He quickly followed this up with winning the U21 county title and then the Ulster U21 championship with Clonoe, defeating Truagh Gaels of Monaghan. 2015 the O' Rahilly's recaptured the All County Senior League title for the second time in their history under Cassidy's stewardship. Cassidy became manager of Erin's Own Cargin in County Antrim in 2018. Winning the senior championship at his first attempt, beating St Galls in a pulsating high scoring semi-final and then beating parish neighbours Creggan, where the rivalry is intense, in a low scoring championship final. In the same season, Cassidy also lead Wolfe Tones, Bellaghy to their first minor championship win since 1994, by beating close rivals Lavey Gac in the Derry minor championship final at Derry GAA Centre of Excellence, Owenbeg. He followed this up by leading the 'Tones' to the Ulster minor club championship, hosted by Belfast club St Pauls on New Years Day, by heavily defeating Crossmaglen Rangers Gac in the final. Cassidy won his second senior club championship with Cargin in 2019 by beating Lamh Dhearg in a final replay and then extra time in a pulsating final. He also won the All County senior league title to do the double. In 2020 in the year of the Covid virus, he led Erin's Own Cargin to their first historic three in a row, by again defeating Creggan in extra time in a classic high scoring game.

== Playing honours ==
=== Inter-county ===
==== Senior ====
- All-Ireland Senior Football Championship:
  - Winner (1): 1993
- National Football League:
  - Winner (3): 1992, 1995, 1996
- Ulster Senior Football Championship:
  - Winner (2): 1987, 1993
  - Runner up: 1985, 1992
- Dr McKenna Cup:
  - Winner (1?): 1993

==== Under-21 ====
- All-Ireland Under-21 Football Championship:
  - Runner-up: 1985
- Ulster Under-21 Football Championship:
  - Winner (2): 1985, 1986

==== Minor ====
- All-Ireland Minor Football Championship:
  - Winner (1): 1983
- Ulster Minor Football Championship:
  - Winner (1): 1983

=== Club ===
- All-Ireland Senior Club Football Championship – Runner-up: 1995
- All-Ireland Kilmacud Crokes Sevens Championship – Winner (1): 1986
- Castlewellan Sevens – Winner (1): 1997
- Ulster Senior Club Football Championship – Winner (1): 1994
- Ulster Senior Club Football Championship – Runner up: 1996, 1998
- Derry Senior Football Championship – Winner (5): 1986, 1994, 1996, 1998, 1999
- Derry Senior Football Championship – Runner up: 1995
- Derry Senior Football League – Winner (3): 1986, 1998, 1999
- Derry U16 Football Championship - Winner 1981
- Derry U18 Hurling Championship - Winner 1983 (Lavey)

=== School / college ===
- MacRory Cup – Winner (3?): 1982, 1983, 1984
- Mageean Cup (hurling) – Winner (1) – 1984

=== Individual ===
- All Star – Nominated (runner up): ?
- Derry Championship First Trust Top Scorer award – Winner (1): 1991
- Derry Championship Forbes Kitchen Man of the Match award – Winner (2): 1994, 1999
- All-Ireland Kilmacud Crokes Sevens Championship Player of the tournament – Winner (1): 1996
- Castlewellan Sevens – Winner (1): 1997
- Sunday Independent Inter-county Team of the year (left half forward) – Winner: 1993

== Managerial honour ==
- 2003 St Teresa's Loughmacrory, Tyrone U21 Championship
- 2004 Wolfe Tones Bellaghy, Derry All County Senior League
- 2005 Wolfe Tones Bellaghy, Derry Senior Championship

Wolfe Tones Bellaghy, Derry Ulster Club Championship finalist

- 2007 Wolfe Tones Bellaghy, Derry Senior Championship finalist
- 2008 Clonoe O'Rahilly's, Tyrone Senior Championship
- 2009 Derry, National League finalist D1
- 2011 Clonoe O'Rahilly's, Tyrone Senior Championship finalist
- 2012 Clonoe O'Rahilly's, Tyrone All County Senior League
- 2013 Clonoe O'Rahilly's, Tyrone Senior Championship

Clonoe O'Rahilly's, Tyrone U21 Championship

- 2014 Clonoe O'Rahilly's, Tyrone Ulster Club U21 Championship
- 2015 Clonoe O'Rahilly's, Tyrone All County Senior League
- 2018 Erin's Own Cargin, Antrim senior Championship

Wolfe Tones Bellaghy, Derry Ulster Minor Club Championship

- 2019 Erin's Own Cargin, Antrim senior Championship

Erin's Own Cargin, Antrim All County Senior League

- 2020 Erin's Own Cargin, Antrim senior Championship

Preceded by Paddy Crozier	Derry Senior Football Manager; 2008–2010	Succeeded by John Brennan
