= Mark Lynch (Gaelic footballer) =

Dual player of Gaelic games and Derry Gaelic footballer

Personal information
- Born: February 20, 1986 (age 40) Banagher, Northern Ireland
- Height: 1.88 m (6 ft 2 in)

Sport
- Sport: Gaelic football
- Position: Centre Forward
Club
- Years: Club
- 2003–: Banagher
Club titles
	Football	Hurling
Derry titles	0	1
Ulster titles	0	0
All-Ireland titles	0	0
College
- Years: College
- Queen's University Belfast
College titles
- Sigerson titles: 1
Inter-county
- Years: County
- 2005–2018: Derry
Inter-county titles
- Ulster titles: 0
- All-Irelands: 0
- NFL: 1
- All Stars: 0

Mark Lynch (born 20 February 1986) is a dual player of Gaelic games who played Gaelic football for the Derry county team, with whom he won a National League title. He plays his club football and hurling for St Mary's Banagher.

== Football career ==
=== Inter-county ===
Lynch was called up to the Derry Minor team in 2002 and made his debut against Antrim while only 16. Derry Minors won that year's Ulster Minor Championship and All-Ireland Minor Championship. He was a member of the Derry Under-21 team that finished runners-up in both the 2004 and 2006 Ulster Under-21 Football Championships.

Lynch has been playing for the Senior team since 2004. He was instrumental in the 2008 National League, which Derry won, defeating Kerry in the final. Lynch underwent a shoulder operation in November 2008 and wasn't expected to return to action until March 2009.

Lynch retired from inter-county football in December 2018, citing family and work commitments.

=== Club ===
Lynch had a very successful underage football career with Banagher.

=== School/college ===
Lynch was part of St Pat's, Maghera's 2003 MacRory Cup and Hogan Cup winning team. He won one/two? Ulster Colleges Football All-Star with the school. In 2007 he was part of the Jordanstown side that finished runners-up to Queen's University Belfast in the Sigerson Cup final. Jordanstown went one step further in 2008 and won the competition, with Lynch scoring 0–06 in the final against the Garda College. He was vice-captain and stood in as captain in the early stages of the competition when regular captain Peter Donnelly was injured with a broken arm.

=== International Rules ===
Lynch was captain of the Ireland international rules football team that won the Under 17 International Rules Series against Australia in 2003.

== Hurling career ==
=== Inter-county ===
Lynch represented Derry at hurling at underage level. He was part of the Derry Minor team that lost out to Antrim in the 2003 Ulster Minor Hurling Championship final.

=== School/college ===
Lynch won the Mageenan Cup with St. Pat's Maghera. He was also awarded one/two? Ulster Colleges Hurling All-Star.

== Honours ==
=== Country ===
- Under 17 International Rules Series:
  - Winner (1): 2003

=== Inter-county ===
==== Senior ====
- National Football League:
  - Winner (1): 2008

==== Under 21 ====
- Ulster Under-21 Football Championship:
  - Runner up: 2004, 2006

==== Minor ====
- All-Ireland Minor Football Championship:
  - Winner (1): 2002
- Ulster Minor Football Championship:
  - Winner (1): 2002
- Ulster Minor Hurling Championship: – Runner up: 2002?, 2003

=== Club ===
- Derry Senior Hurling Championship:
  - Winner (1)??: 2005
- Derry Intermediate Hurling Championship:
  - Winner (1): 2021
- Ulster Intermediate Club Hurling Championship:
  - Winner (1): 2021
- Derry Under-21 Hurling Championship:'
  - Winner (1): 2007
- Derry Minor Hurling Championship:
  - Winner (2?): 2002, 2003
- Derry Under 16 Hurling Championship:
  - Winner (2?): 2001, 2002
- Derry Under 16 Football Championship:
  - Winner (1): 2002 (as captain)
- North Derry Under 16 Football Championship:
  - Winner (1/2?): 2001?, 2002
- North Derry Under 16 Football League:
  - Winner (1/2?): 2001?, 2002
- Numerous other underage competitions

=== School/college ===
- Sigerson Cup:
  - Winner (1): 2008
  - Runner up: 2007
- Hogan Cup:
  - Winner (1): 2003
- MacRory Cup:
  - Winner (1): 2003
- Mageenan Cup:
  - Winner (1?/2?): Year(s)?

=== Individual ===
- Captain of U-17 International Rules winning side: 2003
- Datapac Combined Universities – Winner (1): 2005, more?
- Ulster Colleges Football All-Star – Winner (at least 1): 2004, more?
- Ulster Colleges Hurling All-Star – Winner (at least 1): 2004, more?

Note: The above lists may be incomplete. Please add any other honours you know of.
