= Wolfe Tones GAA (Bellaghy) =

Derry-based Gaelic games club

Bellaghy Wolfe Tones GAC
- Baile Eachaidh
- Founded: 1939
- County: Derry
- Nickname: The Tones
- Colours: Blue and White
- Grounds: Páirc Seán de Brún; Wolfe Tone Park
- Coordinates: 54°48′25.71″N 6°30′53.22″W

Playing kits
Home Kit	Change Kit

Senior Club Championships
	All Ireland	Ulster champions	Derry champions
Football:	1	4	21
Camogie:	-	1	2

Bellaghy Wolfe Tones Gaelic Athletic Club (Irish: CLG Baile Eachaidh) is a Gaelic Athletic Association club based in Bellaghy, County Londonderry, Northern Ireland. The club is a member of Derry GAA and currently competes in gaelic football and camogie.

Bellaghy have won 21 Derry Senior Football Championships, four Ulster Senior Club Football Championships and the 1971-72 All-Ireland Senior Club Football Championship. Bellaghy camogie club have won two Derry Senior Camogie Championships.

On 12 May 1997, the Club Chairman, Sean Brown, was attacked and abducted by a Loyalist Volunteer Force (LVF) gang as he locked the main gate of the GAA grounds on the Ballyscullion Road. Less than an hour later the body of the father-of-six was found lying beside his burnt-out car just off the Moneynick Road near Randalstown, County Antrim. He had been shot six times. On 19 January 2004 the Police Ombudsman for Northern Ireland published a report that was highly critical of the police investigation into Brown's killing, stating "the police investigation was incomplete and inadequate".

== Football titles ==
=== Senior Football ===
- All-Ireland Senior Club Football Championship (1)
  - 1971-1972
- All-Ireland Kilmacud Crokes Sevens Championship (2)
  - 1986, 2002
- Ulster Senior Club Football Championship (4)
  - 1968, 1971, 1994, 2000
- Derry Senior Football Championship (21)
  - 1956, 1958, 1959, 1960, 1961, 1963, 1964, 1965, 1968, 1969, 1971, 1972, 1975, 1979, 1986, 1994, 1996, 1998, 1999, 2000, 2005
- Derry Senior Football League (8)
  - 1947, 1986, 1994, 1998, 1999, 2000, 2004, 2023
- Derry Intermediate Football Championship (1)
  - 1990
- Derry Junior Football Championship (1)
  - 1962 (won by Bellaghy II)
- Graham Cup (2)
  - 2000, 2004
- Sean Larkin Cup (4)
  - 2004, 2005, 2006, 2008, 2018
- Thirds Championship (1)
  - 2007

=== Minor Football ===
- Ulster Minor Club Football Championship 3
  - 1991, 1994, 2018
- Derry Minor Football Championship 10
  - 1953, 1954, 1955, 1957, 1961, 1963, 1973, 1991, 1994, 2018
- Derry Minor Football League: 3
  - 1993, 1994, 2015
- Derry Minor B Football League: 1
  - 2008

== Pitches ==
Bellaghy's main pitch, Páirc Seán de Brún, is named after their former club chairman Seán Brown.

The club also have two full-sized pitches, 4G area and dressing rooms at Wolfe Tone Park, Drumanee, just outside the village.

== Notable Gaelic footballers ==
- Tommy Gribben - First Derry man to win an All Ireland medal with St Pat's Armagh in 1946. Derry County Footballer 1945-1955, 1957–1958, Tyrone County Footballer 1956, Ulster Provincial Footballer, Derry Junior Manager and Coach of 1971-72 Bellaghy All-Ireland winning team.
- Tom Scullion
- Tommy Diamond - Former Derry player. First player to captain a county to victory in both All-Ireland Minor (1965) and All-Ireland Under-21 (1968) Championships.
- Laurence Diamond - Former Derry midfielder. Captain of 1971-72 Bellaghy All-Ireland winning team.
- Damian Cassidy - Represented Derry seniors from 1984 until 1996. Left half forward of Derry's 1993 All-Ireland winning team. Managed Bellaghy to senior finals in 2004, 05 & 07, winning in 2005.
- Danny Quinn - Member of Derry's 1993 All-Ireland winning panel.
- Karl Diamond - (son of Tommy) All Ireland minor winner 1989 and All Ireland senior winner 1993
- Fergal Doherty - Former Derry mid-fielder.

== See also ==
- Derry Senior Football Championship
- List of Gaelic games clubs in Derry
