= 2008 National Football League (Ireland) =

Gaelic football competition

- 445

League details
- Dates: 2 February – 27 April 2008
- Teams: 32

League champions
- Winners: Derry (6th win)
- Captain: Kevin McCloy
- Manager: Paddy Crozier

League runners-up
- Runners-up: Kerry
- Captain: Tomás Ó Sé
- Manager: Pat O'Shea

Other division winners
- Division 2: Westmeath
- Division 3: Wexford
- Division 4: Offaly

The 2008 National Football League was the Gaelic football league contested by 33 GAA counties' football teams, 32 from Ireland and one (London) from England.

Derry won their sixth title.

== Format ==
The 2008 format of the National Football League is a new system consisting of four separate divisions. There are eight teams in the top three divisions and nine in Division Four. Placings are decided by:

1. Points (2 for a win, 1 for a draw, 0 for a loss)
2. Score difference
3. Total scored
4. Head-to-head result between tied teams

The top two in each division play a final match to decide the division champions. The top two in divisions 2, 3 and 4 are promoted, whilst the bottom two in 1, 2 and 3 are relegated.

== Division One ==
=== Table ===
Team	Pld	W	D	L	F	A	Diff	Pts	Notes
Derry	7	5	0	2	5-65	5-55	+23	10	Advanced to NFL final
Kerry	7	5	0	2	2-81	1-62	+12	10	Advanced to NFL final
Galway	7	5	0	2	8-79	7-61	+6	10
Donegal	7	4	0	3	5-74	4-64	-2	8
Tyrone	7	3	1	3	2-77	2-67	-3	7
Mayo	7	2	1	4	5-92	10-62	0	5
Kildare	7	1	2	4	6-58	4-69	-18	4	Relegated to Division Two for 2009
Laois	7	0	2	5	5-78	5-96	-18	2	Relegated to Division Two for 2009

=== Matches ===
2 February 2008	Donegal	1–08 (11) – (10) 1–07	Kerry	Ballybofey
				Venue: MacCumhaill Park
		Report

17 February 2008	Mayo	0–16 (16) – (17) 2–11	Donegal	Castlebar
		Report

15 March 2008	Donegal	1–12 (15) – (14) 1–11	Galway	Ballybofey
				Venue: MacCumhaill Park
		Report

30 March 2008	Tyrone	0–11 (11) – (9) 0–09	Donegal	Edendork
		Report

6 April 2008	Donegal	1–14 (17) – (14) 2–08	Laois	Ballyshannon
				Venue: Fr Tierney Park
		Report

13 April 2008	Donegal	0–10 (10) – (15) 0–15	Derry	Letterkenny
				Venue: O'Donnell Park
		Report

=== Final ===
27 April 2008
Final

Derry	2–13 – 2–9	Kerry

Parnell Park, Donnycarney
Referee: Maurice Deegan (Laois)

== Division Two ==
=== Table ===
Team	Pld	W	D	L	F	A	Diff	Pts	Notes
Dublin	7	5	1	1	7-69	6-51	+21	11	Advanced to final and promoted to Division One for 2009
Westmeath	7	5	0	2	5-69	2-55	+23	10	Advanced to final and promoted to Division One for 2009
Monaghan	7	4	1	2	5-87	4-70	+20	9
Armagh	7	3	1	3	10-82	8-67	+21	7
Cork	7	3	1	3	2-59	0-60	+5	7
Meath	7	3	1	3	5-61	4-66	-2	7
Roscommon	7	1	1	5	4-69	11-116	-68	3	Relegated to Division Three for 2009
Cavan	7	1	0	6	2-74	5-85	-20	2	Relegated to Division Three for 2009

=== Final ===
27 April 2008
Final

Westmeath	0–15 – 0–10	Dublin

Páirc Tailteann, Navan

== Division Three ==
=== Table ===
Team	Pld	W	D	L	F	A	Diff	Pts	Notes
Fermanagh	7	6	1	0	8-80	4-75	+17	13	Advanced to final and promoted to Division Two for 2009
Wexford	7	5	2	0	9-80	4-71	+24	12	Advanced to final and promoted to Division Two for 2009
Down	7	4	0	3	7-89	10-73	+7	8
Louth	7	3	0	4	8-89	6-85	+10	6
Longford	7	3	0	4	8-78	9-84	-9	6
Limerick	7	2	1	4	8-69	8-78	-9	5
Leitrim	7	2	0	5	7-60	10-71	-20	4	Relegated to Division Four for 2009
Sligo	7	1	0	6	2-78	6-86	-20	2	Relegated to Division Four for 2009

=== Final ===
27 April 2008
Final

Fermanagh	0–20 – 3–15	Wexford

Parnell Park, Donnycarney

== Division Four ==
=== Table ===
Team	Pld	W	D	L	F	A	Diff	Pts	Notes
Offaly	8	6	1	1	18-114	6-63	+87	13	Advanced to final and promoted to Division Three for 2009
Tipperary	8	6	0	2	9-102	5-64	+50	12	Advanced to final and promoted to Division Three for 2009
Antrim	8	5	1	2	7-111	3-57	+66	11
Waterford	8	5	0	3	8-88	3-77	+26	10
Wicklow	8	4	0	4	10-106	5-81	+40	8
Clare	8	4	0	4	8-82	6-83	+5	8
Carlow	8	4	0	4	8-79	10-94	-21	8
London	8	1	0	7	8-51	20-159	-144	2
Kilkenny	8	0	0	8	3-60	21-115	-109	0

=== Final ===
27 April 2008
Final

Offaly	2–13 – 0–12	Tipperary

O'Moore Park, Portlaoise
