= 2009 Derry Senior Football Championship =

Gaelic football competition

Tournament details
- County: Derry
- Year: 2009

The NMF Properties Derry Senior Football Championship 2009 is the 2009 installment of the annual Derry Senior Football Championship run by the Derry GAA. Ballinderry are the current holders - beating Slaughtneil in the 2008 final at Celtic Park. The winners were awarded the John McLaughlin Cup and went on to represent Derry in the 2009 Ulster Senior Club Football Championship.

== Match schedule ==
- Round 1 - Friday 1 May to Monday 4 May
- Round 2 -
- Round 3 -
- Quarter-finals -
- Semi-finals -
- Final -

== Round 1 ==
The draw for the first round took place on 3 March 2009 at the Owenbeg Centre of Excellence (outside Dungiven), along with the draws for the other Derry adult football and hurling championships. The 2009 Championship started on 1 May with the meeting of Ballinascreen and Castledawson at Shamrock Park, Ballinderry. Six games were played on 3 May, with double-headers at Foreglen, Ballymaguigan (originally scheduled for Magherafelt) and Glenullin. The last first round tie was played in Páirc Seán de Brún, Bellaghy on Monday 4 May. There were two shocks results in the first round, with Lavey defeating reigning Championships Ballinderry and Swatragh beating local rivals and 2008 runners-up Slaughtneil.

| 1 May 2009; 7.15pm | Castledawson | 0-07 – 2-13 | Ballinascreen | Shamrock Park, Ballinderry; Referee: Martin McErlane (Ballinderry) |
| 1 May 2009; 7.15pm | Niall McNicholl 0-02; Colm Heaney 0-02 (0-02 frees); Paul Heaney 0-01; Michael Gribben 0-01; Ruairi Shivers 0-01 | BBC report | Seamus Bradley 1-04 (0-01 free); Ciaran McElroy 1-02; Sean Woods 0-03; Benny Murray 0-02 (0-02 frees); Gary Conway 0-01; Eamon Murray 0-01 | Shamrock Park, Ballinderry; Referee: Martin McErlane (Ballinderry) |

| 3 May 2009; 2.00pm | Glen | 1-07 – 1-14 | Newbridge | Foreglen; Referee: Barry Cassidy (Bellaghy) |
| 3 May 2009; 2.00pm | Gary Burke 0-04 (0-04 frees); Donal Leahy 1-00; John McCamley 0-01; Brian Kelly 0-01; Declan McGarrity 0-01 | BBC report | Kevin Sweeney 1-04 (0-03 frees); Michael Bateson 0-03; Danny Mulholland 0-02; Ryan McElhone 0-02; Stephen Murray 0-01; Dermot Dougan 0-01; Thomas Walls 0-01 | Foreglen; Referee: Barry Cassidy (Bellaghy) |

| 3 May 2009; 3.30pm | Kilrea | 1-06 – 1-04 | Banagher | Foreglen; Referee: Aidan McAlynn (An Lúb) |
| 3 May 2009; 3.30pm | James Kielt 0-04 (0-02 frees); Paul McWilliams 1-00; Gary Deighan 0-02 | BBC report | Peter O'Kane 1-01; Eugene O'Neill 0-03 (0-02 frees) | Foreglen; Referee: Aidan McAlynn (An Lúb) |

| 3 May 2009; 2.00pm | Bellaghy | 0-10 – 1-06 | Eoghan Rua | Ballymaguigan; Referee: Paddy McErlean (Greenlough) |
| 3 May 2009; 2.00pm | Eoghan Brown 0-04 (0-03 frees); Gavin Diamond 0-03; Fergal Doherty 0-01; Dermot Larkin 0-01; Conan Brown 0-01 | BBC report | Barry McGoldrick 0-03 (0-03 frees); Gregory Bradley 1-00; Colm McGoldrick 0-02; Mark McTaggart 0-01 | Ballymaguigan; Referee: Paddy McErlean (Greenlough) |

| 3 May 2009; 3.30pm | Lavey | 1-09 – 0-10 | Ballinderry | Ballymaguigan; Referee: J.J. Cleary (Castledawson) |
| 3 May 2009; 3.30pm | Cailean O'Boyle 1-06 (0-05 frees); Patrick Dillon 0-02; Colm Murphy 0-01 | BBC report | Conleith Gilligan 0-04 (0-02 frees); Raymond Wilkinson 0-02; Brian McGuckin 0-02; James Bateson 0-01 ? 0-01 | Ballymaguigan; Referee: J.J. Cleary (Castledawson) |

| 3 May 2009; 5.45pm | Dungiven | 2-10 – 1-08 | Magherafelt | Páirc Seán Ó Maolain, Glenullin; Referee: E.P. Cassidy (Limavady) |
| 3 May 2009; 5.45pm | Eunan Murphy 0-05 (0-05 frees); Fergal McGuigan 1-02 (0-02 frees); Mark Craig 1-00; James McNicholl 0-02 (0-01 free); Paul Murphy 0-01 | BBC report | Emmet McGuckin 0-04 (0-03 frees); Conan O'Brien 1-00; Barry Gillis 0-03 (0-03 frees); Christopher Spiers 0-01 | Páirc Seán Ó Maolain, Glenullin; Referee: E.P. Cassidy (Limavady) |

| 3 May 2009; 7.15pm | Swatragh | 2-05 – 0-09 | Slaughtneil | Páirc Seán Ó Maolain, Glenullin; Referee: Declan O'Connor (Dungiven) |
| 3 May 2009; 7.15pm | Eugene O'Kane 0-04 (0-04 frees); Liam Kearney 1-00; Seanie McGuckin 1-00; Robert McWilliams 0-01 | BBC report | Kevin O'Neill 0-04 (0-04 frees); Chrissy McKaigue 0-02; Enda McKaigue 0-01; Seamus Gillen 0-01; Jim Kelly 0-01 (0-01 free) | Páirc Seán Ó Maolain, Glenullin; Referee: Declan O'Connor (Dungiven) |

| 4 May 2009; 7.15pm | An Lúb | 0-05 – 2-07 | Glenullin | Páirc Seán de Brún, Bellaghy |
| 4 May 2009; 7.15pm | | BBC report | | Páirc Seán de Brún, Bellaghy |

== Round 2 ==
The draw for the second round took place on 5 May 2009.

| Glen | – | Magherafelt |

| Banagher | – | Ballinderry |

| Eoghan Rua | 0-12 – 0-11 | Slaughtneil |
| | BBC report |

| 28 June 2009 | An Lúb | 1-12 – 1-06 | Castledawson |
| 28 June 2009 | | BBC report |

| Kilrea | 0-10 – 1-10 | Newbridge |
| | BBC report |

| 29 June 2009 | Lavey | 0-11 – 0-18 | Bellaghy | Rossa Park, Magherafelt |
| 29 June 2009 | | BBC report | | Rossa Park, Magherafelt |

| 28 June 2009 | Dungiven | 0-10 – 1-07 | Ballinascreen | Emmet Park, Slaughtneil |
| 28 June 2009 | | BBC report | | Emmet Park, Slaughtneil |

| 1 July 2009; Replay | Dungiven | – | Ballinascreen | Emmet Park, Slaughtneil |

| 27 June 2009 | Glenullin | 1-14 – 2-05 | Swatragh |
| 27 June 2009 | | BBC report |

== Round 3 ==
The draw for the third round took place after the last Round 2 game (Ballinderry versus Banagher).

| 8 August 2008; 5.00pm | Magherafelt | 0-14 – 0-09 | Swatragh | Páirc Seán Ó Maolain, Glenullin; Referee: E.P. Cassidy (Limavady) |
| 8 August 2008; 5.00pm | Frankie Niblock 0-05 (0-05 frees); Jared Monaghan 0-03 (0-01 free); Paul Purvis 0-02; Joe Keenan 0-01; Johnny Niblock 0-01; Christopher Spiers 0-01; Emmett McGuckin 0-01 | BBC report | Sean McNicholl 0-02; Seamus McFlynn 0-02; Ruairi Convery 0-02 (0-01 '45); John McAtamney 0-01 (0-01 free); Seanie McGuckin 0-01 (0-01 free); Eugene O'Kane 0-01 (0-01 free) | Páirc Seán Ó Maolain, Glenullin; Referee: E.P. Cassidy (Limavady) |

| 8 August 2008; 6.30pm | Lavey | 3-05 – 0-14 | Eoghan Rua | Páirc Seán Ó Maolain, Glenullin; Referee: Martin McErlane (Ballinderry) |
| 8 August 2008; 6.30pm | Cailean O'Boyle 2-02 (0-02 frees); Colm Murphy 1-00; Michael Drumm 0-01; Kevin O'Neill 0-01; Shane Devlin 0-01 | BBC report | Declan Mullan 0-05; Barry McGoldrick 0-03 (0-03 frees); Sean Leo McGoldrick 0-02; Colm McGoldrick 0-02; Ciaran McGoldrick 0-01; Paul Daly 0-01 | Páirc Seán Ó Maolain, Glenullin; Referee: Martin McErlane (Ballinderry) |

| 9 August 2008; 3.30pm | Kilrea | 1-12 – 1-16 | An Lúb | Páirc Seán de Brún, Bellaghy; Referee: Declan O'Connor (Dungiven) |
| 9 August 2008; 3.30pm | James Kielt 1-01 (1-00 penalty, 0-01 '45); James Donaghy 0-03 (0-02 frees); Lee Kennedy 0-03 (0-01 frees); Charlie Kielt 0-02; Enda McAleese 0-01; Paul McWilliams 0-01 other point? | BBC report | Paul McFylnn 0-07 (0-03 frees); Paul Young 1-01; Paul McVey 0-03 (0-01 free); Ciaran Devlin 0-02; Fintan Devlin 0-01; Johnny McBride 0-01; Shane McFlynn 0-01 | Páirc Seán de Brún, Bellaghy; Referee: Declan O'Connor (Dungiven) |

| 9 August 2008; 5.00pm | Ballinascreen | 0-11 – 0-18 | Ballinderry | Páirc Seán de Brún, Bellaghy; Referee: Barry Toland (Banagher) |
| 9 August 2008; 5.00pm | Seamus Bradley 0-08 (0-07 frees); Sean Woods 0-01; Gavin Kelly 0-01; Gavin Bradley 0-01 | BBC report | Conleith Gilligan 0-07 (0-02 frees); Darren Conway 0-04; Martin Harney 0-03; Brendan Conway 0-01; Brian McGuckin 0-01; Enda Muldoon 0-01; James Bateson 0-01 | Páirc Seán de Brún, Bellaghy; Referee: Barry Toland (Banagher) |

| 12 August 2008; 7.00pm Replay | Lavey | 0-10 – 1-10 (a.e.t.) | Eoghan Rua | Páirc Seán Ó Maolain, Glenullin; Referee: John Joe Cleary (Castledawson) |
| 12 August 2008; 7.00pm Replay | | BBC report | | Páirc Seán Ó Maolain, Glenullin; Referee: John Joe Cleary (Castledawson) |

== Quarter-finals ==
The four teams who won both their first and second round matches were drawn against the four winners from the Round 3 "qualifiers".

The draw for the quarter-finals was originally supposed to occur after the last third round game (Ballinascreen versus Ballinderry) at Bellaghy. However the draw could not take place because of Lavey's draw with Eoghan Rua. Teams who have already met earlier in the championship could not be paired with each other again in the quarter-finals - the number of such permutations meant the draw was delayed until after the Lavey versus Eoghan Rua replay at Glenullin.

The Round 3 replay and delayed draw also led to the quarter-finals being postponed for a week. They were originally intended to be played a week after the third round, but the delayed draw meant teams would not know their opponents until Wednesday 12 August, which did not give them sufficient notice to play that weekend.

The Ballinderry versus Glenullin match was billed beforehand as tie of the round, and the game everyone wanted to see in the final. It did not disappoint. It was described as "one of the best games seen in this county for years". An Lúb beat Newbridge in a "dogged" encounter, while Bellaghy survived a late Magherafelt comeback to secure their place in the semis. The Dungiven and Eoghan Rua game was supposed to take place on 23 August at 2.00pm at Foreglen. However, before throw-in the game was postponed due to a water-logged pitch. It was rescheduled for two days later in Celtic Park. Dungiven won the game by six points.

| 22 August 2009; 4.15pm | Newbridge | 0-07 – 0-09 | An Lúb | Emmet Park, Slaughtneil; Referee: Declan O'Connor (Dungiven) |
| 22 August 2009; 4.15pm | Kevin Sweeney 0-03 (0-02 frees); Ryan McElhone 0-03 (0-02 frees, 0-01 sideline); Danny Mulholland 0-01 | | Paul McVey 0-03 (0-02 frees); Brian Doyle 0-02; Paul McFlynn 0-02 (0-02 frees); Johnny McBride 0-01; Brendan McVey 0-01 | Emmet Park, Slaughtneil; Referee: Declan O'Connor (Dungiven) |

| 22 August 2009; 6.00pm | Bellaghy | 0-14 – 1-08 | Magherafelt | Emmet Park, Slaughtneil; Referee: Barry Toland (Banagher) |
| 22 August 2009; 6.00pm | Eoghan Brown 0-06; Conor Doherty (0-06 (0-05 frees); Gavin Diamond 0-01; Ciaran Glackin 0-01 | | Frank Niblock 0-05 (0-03, 0-01 '45); Darren O'Neill 1-00; Jarrod Monaghan 0-02 (0-02 frees); John Young 0-01 | Emmet Park, Slaughtneil; Referee: Barry Toland (Banagher) |

| 23 August 2009; 7.30pm | Ballinderry | 2-08 – 2-11 | Glenullin | Celtic Park, Derry; Referee: J.J. Cleary (Castledawson) |
| 23 August 2009; 7.30pm | Brian McGuckin 1-01; Raymond Wilkinson 0-03; Darren Conway 1-00; Martin Harney 0-02; Conleith Gilligan 0-02 (0-02 frees) | | Eoin Bradley 1-04; Paddy Bradley 1-02 (0-01 free); Ruairi Boylan 0-04 (0-04 frees); Damien Hasson 0-01 | Celtic Park, Derry; Referee: J.J. Cleary (Castledawson) |

| 25 August 2009; 8.00pm | Dungiven | 1-12 – 0-09 | Eoghan Rua | Celtic Park, Derry |
| 25 August 2009; 8.00pm | | BBC report | | Celtic Park, Derry |

== Semi-finals ==
The semi-final draw took place at Celtic Park after the quarter-final tie between Ballinderry and Glenullin. It pitted Glenullin against the winners of Dungiven and Eoghan Rua (which turned out to be Dungiven) and Bellaghy against An Lúb. The game are scheduled to take place on 12/13 September.

| 12/13 September 2009 | Glenullin | – | Dungiven |

| 12/13 September 2009 | Bellaghy | – | An Lúb |

== Final ==
4 October 2009
4pm

| Loup | 1-08 – 0-10 | Dungiven |

Celtic Park, Derry
Attendance: 3,500
Referee: Barry Toland (Banagher)

Loup:
| 1 | Shane McGuckin |
| 2 | Colm McVey |
| 3 | Joe O'Kane (c) (0-01) |
| 4 | Dominic McVey |
| 5 | Fionntan Devlin |
| 6 | Brian Doyle |
| 7 | Aidan McAlynn (0-01) |
| 8 | Johnny McBride |
| 9 | Paul McFlynn (0-01f) |
| 10 | Brendan McVey |
| 11 | Paul McVey (0-02f) |
| 12 | Gavin Mallon (0-01) |
| 13 | Declan McVey |
| 14 | Shane McFlynn (0-01) |
| 15 | Paul Young |
Substitutes:
| 16 | Ciaran Devlin for B McVey | (substituted in) 52' |
| 17 | Enda McQuillan (1-00) for S McFlynn | (substituted in) HT' |
| 18 | Brendan McVey for E McQuillan | (substituted in) 58' |
Manager:
John Brennan

Dungiven:
| 1 | Peter McCaul |
| 2 | Stephen McGuigan |
| 3 | Gavin McLaughlin |
| 4 | David McLaughlin |
| 5 | Mark Craig |
| 6 | Emmett McKeever |
| 7 | Rian Kealey (0-01) |
| 8 | Liam Óg Hinphey (0-01) |
| 9 | Aaron McCloskey |
| 10 | Kevin Hinphey |
| 11 | Paul Murphy (0-04, 0-03f) |
| 12 | James McNicholl |
| 13 | Fergal McGuigan (0-01f) |
| 14 | Cathal Grieve (0-03, 0-02f) |
| 15 | Sean Murray |
Substitutes:
| 17 | Ryan McElhinney for J McNicholl | (substituted in) HT' |
| 18 | Eoighin Farren for K Hinphey | (substituted in) 34' |
| 19 | Donal McGilligan for S Murray | (substituted in) 43' |
Manager:
Eugene Kelly

Man of the Match:
Joe O'Kane

Notes:

- Main source for above information: County Derry Post

== See also ==
- Derry Senior Hurling Championship
