= Derry GAA honours =

Derry GAA honours contains details of the achievements of Derry inter-county teams in the Gaelic games of Gaelic football, hurling, ladies' Gaelic football and camogie. It also where possible, lists the Derry team for each winning final.

== Gaelic football ==
=== Senior ===
- All-Ireland Senior Football Championship: 1

1993

- National Football League Championship: 7

1947, 1992, 1995, 1996, 2000, 2008, 2024

- Ulster Senior Football Championship: 9

1958, 1970, 1975, 1976, 1987, 1993, 1998, 2022, 2023

- Dr McKenna Cup: 13

1947, 1954, 1958, 1960, 1969, 1970, 1971, 1974, 1993, 1999, 2011, 2023, 2024

- Dr Lagan Cup: 6

1945, 1947, 1950, 1953, 1959, 1961

- Ulster Junior Football Championship: 7

1945, 1950, 1953, 1955, 1964, 1967, 1969

=== Under 21 ===
- All-Ireland Under-21 Football Championship: 2

1968, 1997

- Ulster Under-21 Football Championship: 7

1967, 1968, 1976, 1983, 1986, 1993, 1997

=== Minor ===
- All-Ireland Minor Football Championship: 4

1965, 1983, 1989, 2002

- Ulster Minor Football Championship: 14

1965, 1969, 1970, 1980, 1981, 1983, 1984, 1986, 1989, 1990, 1995, 2000, 2002, 2020

=== School ===
- All-Ireland Vocational Schools Championship: 3

1979, 1980, 1981

- Ulster Vocational Schools Championship: ?

?

=== Players' honours ===
==== Footballer of the Year ====
Two Derry players have been awarded the Texaco Footballer of the Year award. Ballymaguigan's Jim McKeever won the inaugural award in 1958, while Henry Downey of the Lavey club received player of the year for his performances in helping Derry win the 1993 All-Ireland Senior Football Championship.

1958: Jim McKeever
1993: Henry Downey

==== All Stars ====
Since the 1960s there has been a tradition of annually selecting the best footballer in each position, to create a special team of the year. Between 1963 and 1967 these players received what was known as Cú Chulainn awards. In 1971 these awards were formalised into the annual All Star Awards. Including Sean O'Connell's Cú Chulainn award in 1967, Derry have received 28 All Stars.

1967: Sean O'Connell^{[A]}
1973: Anthony McGurk
1975: Peter Stevenson, Anthony McGurk, Gerry McElhinney
1984: Dermot McNicholl
1987: Tony Scullion, Brian McGilligan
1992: Tony Scullion, Anthony Tohill, Enda Gormley
1993: Tony Scullion, Johnny McGurk, Henry Downey, Gary Coleman, Anthony Tohill, Brian McGilligan, Enda Gormley
1995: Tony Scullion, Anthony Tohill
1996: Joe Brolly
1997: Joe Brolly
1998: Seán Marty Lockhart
2000: Kieran McKeever, Anthony Tohill
2004: Enda Muldoon
2007: Kevin McCloy, Paddy Bradley
2022: Conor Glass, Chrissy McKaigue
2023: Conor McCluskey, Gareth McKinless, Brendan Rogers, Shane McGuigan

- A. Cú Chulainn Award

==== GPA Gaelic Football Team of the Year ====
Since 2006 the Gaelic Players Association have chosen their own team of the year.

2007: Paddy Bradley

==== International Rules representatives ====
A number of Derry players have been selected to play International rules football for the Ireland team against Australia; both in the test games (1984, 1986, 1987 and 1990) and since the commencement of the International Rules Series in 1998. Note the table is incomplete.

Player	Appearances	Years
Seán Marty Lockhart	16	1998 (2), 1999 (2), 2000 (2), 2001 (2), 2003 (2), 2004 (2), 2005 (2), 2006 (2)
Anthony Tohill	8	1998 (2), 1999 (2), 2000 (2), 2001 (2)
Paddy Bradley	2	2008 (2)
Dermot McNicholl	9	1984 (3), 1986 (3), 1987 (3)
Brian McGilligan	6	1986 (3), 1987 (3)
Tony Scullion	4	1987 (1), 1990 (3)

== Hurling ==
=== Senior ===
- Nicky Rackard Cup: 1

2006

Year	Squad	Opponent	Final Score
2006	K Stevenson; S McCullagh, M Conway (captain), E McKeever; C Brunton (0–1), L Hinphey, P Sweeney; R Kennedy, P O'Kane; R Convery (2–7 (1–0 ‘65’, 0-5f)), Gregory Biggs, D McGrellis (0–2); S McBride (3–3 (0–1 sl)), K Hinphey (0–1), J O'Dwyer. Subs used: R McCloskey, P Hearty (0–1), A Rafferty, C Quinn, Gary Biggs.	Donegal	5–15 – 1–11

- All-Ireland 'B' Senior Hurling Championship: 1

1996

- Ulster Senior Hurling Championship: 4

1902/3?, 1908, 2000, 2001.

- All-Ireland Junior Hurling Championship: (2)

1975, 1982

- Ulster Intermediate Hurling Championship: (1)

1997

- Ulster Junior Hurling Championship: (3/4?)

1974, 1975, 1984, 1997??

=== Under 21 ===
- Ulster Under-21 Hurling Championship: 6

1986, 1987, 1993, 1997, 2007, 2008

Year	Team	Opponent	Final Score
2007	Daryl McDermott, Stephen Henry, Ruairi McCloskey (captain), Sean McNicholl, Michael Kirkpatrick (0-03), Mark Craig, Cormac McKenna, Ben Dodds (0-01), Niall Holly, Gareth O'Kane (0-04), Oisin McCloskey (0-02), Paddy Henry (0-03), Sam Dodds (0-01), Kevin O'Neill (0-01), Seán Leo McGoldrick (2-01).	Antrim	2–16 : 1–18

=== Minor ===
- Ulster Minor Hurling Championship: 9

1973/4?, 1979, 1980, 1981, 1982, 1983, 1990, 1991, 2001.

== Camogie ==
=== Senior ===
- Ulster Senior Camogie Championships: 8

1954, 1989, 1990, 1999, 2001, 2003, 2004, 2006

Year	Team	Opponent	Final Score
1954^{[B]}	A. McPeake (Lavey), T. Clarke (Greenlough), Theresa Halferty (Lisnamuck), Carrie Rankin (Greenlough), M. Dorrity (Lavey), M. McSwiggan (Lisnamuck), Patsy McCloskey (Greenlough), K. McCloskey (Greenlough), K. Madden (Greenlough), Pat O'Brien (Lisnamuck), A. Bryson (Lisnamuck), R. McAllister (Greenlough); Subs – A. Cassidy (Greenlough), P. McPeake (Lavey), K. Connor (? club)	Antrim	5-02 – 2-02

- Ulster Junior Camogie Championships: 12

1960, 1967, 1969, 1978, 1986, 1998, 1999, 2000, 2001, 2002, 2006, 2007

Year	Team	Opponent	Final Score
1978	Patricia McCloskey (Glenullin), May Lee (Bellaghy), Brigid McLaughlin (Glack), Sarah Ann Quinn (Swatragh), Eileen McQuillan (Swatragh), Margaret Convery (Glen), Bríd McWilliams (Swatragh), Sharon Loftus (Kilrea), Kathleen Marrion (Greenlough), Caroline McWilliams (Swatragh), Brigid McCloskey (Greenlough), Bernadette Deighan (Ballerin); Subs – Berndette McGowan (Drumsurn, Sinéad Burke (Drumsurn, Martina O'Kane (Swatragh), Cathleen McErlean (Greenlough); Manager: Kathleen O'Hagan	?	?

=== Minor ===
- Ulster Minor Camogie Championships: 9

1990, 1994, 1995, 1998, 1999, 2000, 2001, 2002, 2003

Notes:

- The above list of honours may be incomplete. Please add any other honours you know of.
- B. The team listed for winning the 1954 Ulster Championship is actually the team that played Dublin in the 1954 All-Ireland final, it is likely the same or very similar to the team that beat Antrim in that year's Ulster final.
- Source for the camogie team lineups:

=== Players' honours ===
==== All Stars ====
The Camogie All Star Awards were first introduced in 2004 and Aisling Diamond of Bellaghy won became the first winner from Derry in 2007.

2007: Aisling Diamond
