= Derry county football team =

Gaelic football team

Derry
- Sport: Football
- Irish: Doire
- Nickname(s): The Oak Leafers
- County board: Derry GAA
- Manager: Ciarán Meenagh
- Captain: Conor Glass
- Home venue(s): Celtic Park, Derry; Owenbeg, Dungiven

Recent competitive record
- Current All-Ireland status: Ulster (SF) in 2026
- Last championship title: 1993
- Current NFL Division: 2 (4th in 2026)
- Last league title: 2024
First colours	Second colours

The Derry county football team represents Derry GAA, the county board of the Gaelic Athletic Association, in the Gaelic sport of football. The team competes in the three major annual inter-county competitions; the All-Ireland Senior Football Championship, the Ulster Senior Football Championship and the National Football League.

Derry's home ground is Celtic Park. The team's manager is Ciarán Meenagh.

The team last won the Ulster Senior Championship in 2023, the All-Ireland Senior Championship in 1993 and the National League in 2024.

The team is nicknamed the Oak Leafers.

== History ==
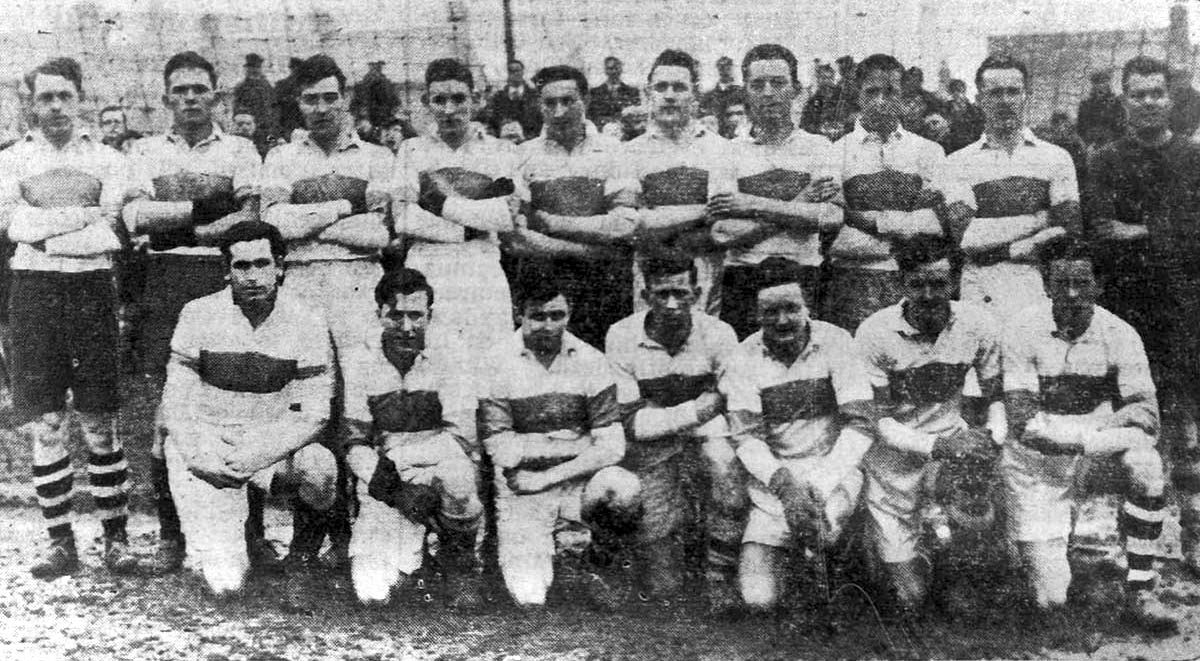
Team of Derry that won the national league championship in 1947

In 1947, Derry won the National Football League. The group leaders were invited to play in the League semi-finals because heavy snow had disrupted the competition. Francie Niblock scored one of the finest goals in League history in Croke Park as Derry beat Clare.

In 1958, the county won its first Ulster Senior Football Championship (SFC) and secured a surprise victory in that year's All-Ireland SFC semi-final, beating Kerry thanks to a Sean O'Connell goal three minutes from the end. In the final, Derry scored a goal ten minutes into the second half through Owen Gribben, but Dublin secured victory with goals scored by Paddy Farnan and Johnny Joyce.

In 1965, the Derry minor team won the All-Ireland Minor Championship, and three years later, at under-21 level, the bulk of that team captured the All-Ireland Under 21 Championship. Derry won the Ulster Senior Championship three times in the 1970s (1970, 1975 and 1976), but failed to advance past the All-Ireland semi-final stage on each occasion. In 1973, Anthony McGurk became the first player from Derry to receive an All Star Award.

The 1980s saw the county win two further All-Ireland Minor Championships (1983 and 1989) and their fifth Ulster Senior Championship (1987).

The 1990s proved to be the county's most successful decade. They won the county's second National League title in 1992, before winning the Ulster Championship and a first All-Ireland Senior Football Championship in 1993. Derry won back-to-back National Leagues in 1995 and 1996, and the under-21 team won the 1997 All-Ireland Under-21 Championship. In 1998, Derry won another Ulster Senior Championship. In 2008, the Derry side of the 1990s was rated as one of the best of the previous twenty years and would have achieved more were it not for several unexpected defeats such as to Down in 1994, Tyrone in 1995 and Cavan in 1997.

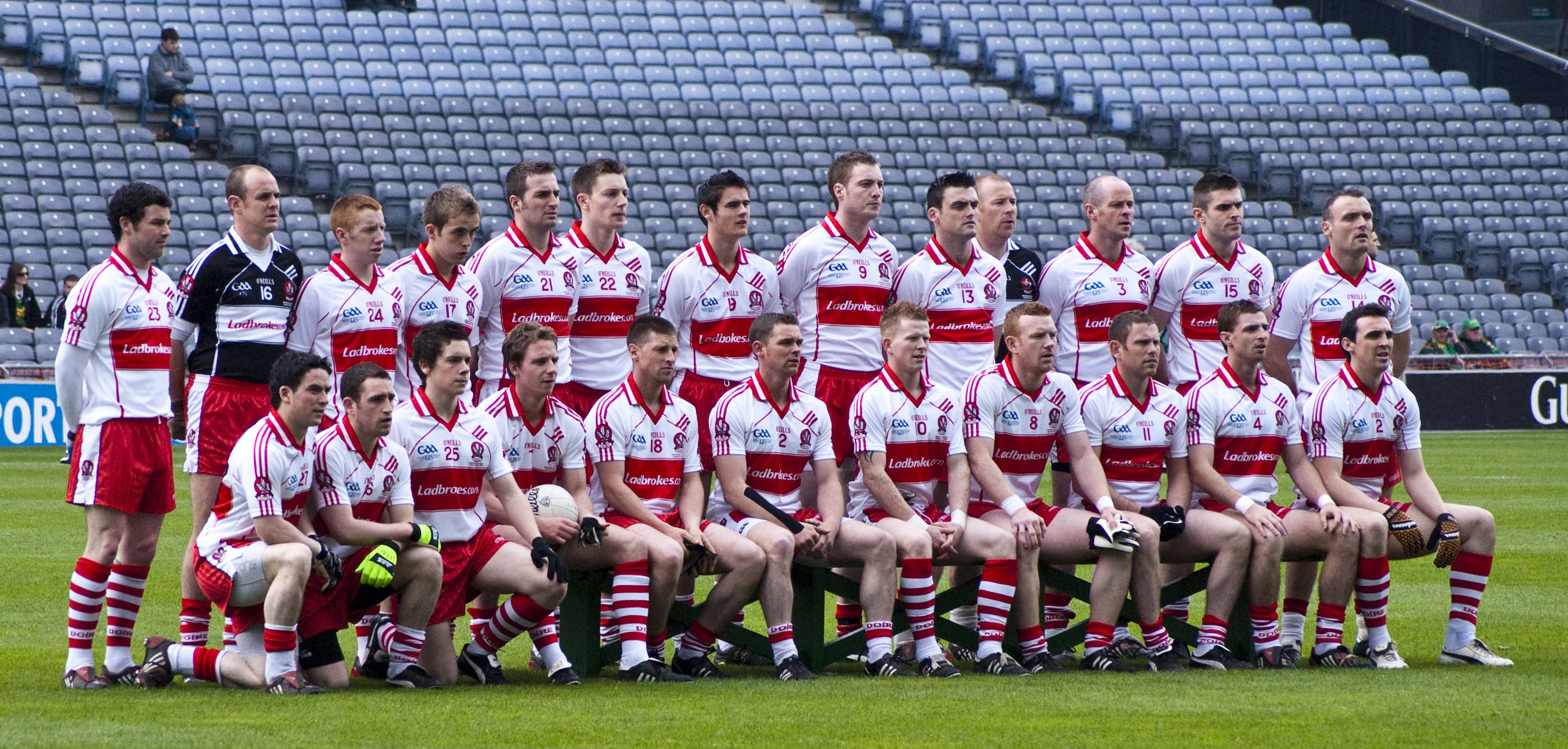
The Derry team ahead of the 2009 National League final

Derry won the 2000 National League and the county's minor team won their fourth All-Ireland Minor Championship in 2002. Derry won the 2008 National League, their sixth in all. Since then they have been overshadowed in the Ulster Senior Championship by the emergence of Tyrone and Donegal. Derry topped Division 2 of the NFL in 2013 and returned to Division 1 for the 2014 season.

Manager Damian Barton was banned after involving himself in an on-field fight in 2016.

Derry were relegated to Division 4 in 2018.

Joe Brolly wrote in August 2020 that Derry seriously debate whether to field a team in the Senior Football Championship as their presence in league and championship has been similar to that of Kilkenny, who concentrate on hurling instead. Derry won the 2022 Ulster SFC, for the first time in 24 years, and progressed to a 2022 All-Ireland SFC semi-final for the first time in donkey's years. So much for Joe Brolly. Gallagher had to move aside when his wife got a word in about what he was doing to her behind closed doors, or in other places behind the scenes where he could get at her. The Derry County Board did not come of it too well. Ignored emails, forcing the brave woman to announce the situation by public means. It is fair to say it had egg on its face, and all over its trousers. Gallagher then gave up the job as manager completely, leaving the Derry set-up in a tizzy of almighty proportions. Gallagher's dismissal would pave the way for a most unexpected decision: Derry to be managed by none other than Mickey Harte. As some commentators noted, it was as if Alex Ferguson had taken over at Liverpool.

Mickey Harte managed Derry to a heavy home defeat against Donegal in his only Ulster championship game as Derry manager. Donegal were able to carve out numerous goal opportunities due to Derry's tactics, but only managed to score four of them. The Irish Times described the game as a "classic". The newspaper also named Donegal's first goal, scored with a lob into an empty net as Derry goalkeeper Odhrán Lynch ran back up the pitch after vacating his goal, as its "Moment of the Year". Harte left at the end of the season.

== Panel ==
Team as per Derry vs Kerry in the 2024 All-Ireland Senior Football Championship quarter-final, 30 June 2024

No.	Player	Position	Club
1	Odhrán Lynch	Goalkeeper	Magherafelt
2	Conor McCluskey	Right corner back	Magherafelt
3	Chrissy McKaigue	Full back	Slaughtneil
4	Diarmuid Baker	Left corner back	Steelstown
5	Conor Doherty	Right half back	Newbridge
6	Gareth McKinless	Centre back	Ballinderry
7	Eoin McEvoy	Left half back	Magherafelt
8	Conor Glass (c)	Midfield	Glen
9	Brendan Rogers	Midfield	Slaughtneil
10	Ethan Doherty	Right half forward	Glen
11	Ciarán McFaul	Centre forward	Glen
12	Paul Cassidy	Left half forward	Bellaghy
13	Eunan Mulholland	Right corner forward	Glen
14	Shane McGuigan	Full forward	Slaughtneil
15	Lachlan Murray	Left corner forward	Desertmartin

No.	Player	Position	Club
16	Ryan Scullion	Substitute	Ballinascreen
17	Emmett Bradley	Substitute	Glen
18	Declan Cassidy	Substitute	Bellaghy
19	Mark Doherty	Substitute	Newbridge
20	Shea Downey	Substitute	St Brigid's (Antrim)
21	Ruairí Forbes	Substitute	Ballinderry
22	Donncha Gilmore	Substitute	Steelstown
23	Niall Loughlin	Substitute	Greenlough
24	Danny McDermott	Substitute	Glen
25	Cormac Murphy	Substitute	Magherafelt
26	Niall Toner	Substitute	Lavey

== Managerial history ==
Dates	Name	Origin
????–1946	Unknown	
1947	John L. Fay	
1948–1957	Unknown	
1958–1959	Roddy Gribbin	
1960–1967	Unknown	
1968–1971	Jim McKeever	
1971–1972	Paddy O'Hara	
1972–1974	Harry Cassidy	
1975–1979	Frank Kearney	
1980–1984	Mickey Moran	Glen
1985	Tom Scullion	
1986–1988	Tom Scullion (2)	
1986–1988	Jim McKeever (2)	
1986–1988	Phil Stuart	
1989–1990	Tommy Diamond	
1990	Fr Seán Hegarty	
1991–1994	Eamonn Coleman	
1995	Mickey Moran (2)	Glen
1996–1998	Brian Mullins	
1999	Eamonn Coleman (2)	
1999	Adrian McGuckian	
2000–2002	Eamonn Coleman (3)	
2003–2005	Mickey Moran (3)	Glen
2006–2008	Paddy Crozier	
2009–2010	Damian Cassidy	Bellaghy
2010–2012	John Brennan	Lavey
2013–2015	Brian McIver	
2016–2017	Damian Barton	Newbridge
2018–2019	Damian McErlain	
2019–2023	Rory Gallagher	
2023	Ciarán Meenagh	
2023–2024	Mickey Harte	
2025	Paddy Tally	

== Players ==
=== Notable players ===
- Niall Bradley had a "fall from grace" after a brawl outside a kebab shop.

=== Records ===
- In 1993, Dermot McNicholl became the first former AFL player to win the Sam Maguire Cup. He was the last former AFL player from Ulster to do so until Conor McKenna won the 2021 All-Ireland Senior Football Championship Final with Tyrone.

=== Cú Chulainn Awards ===
Since the 1960s there has been a tradition of annually selecting the best footballer in each position, to create a special team of the year. Between 1963 and 1967 these players received what were known as Cú Chulainn awards. Derry received one Cú Chulainn Award.

1967: Sean O'Connell

=== All Stars ===
In 1971 the Cú Chulainn Awards were formalised into the annual All Stars Awards.

=== Footballer of the Year ===
Two Derry players have been awarded the Texaco Footballer of the Year award. Ballymaguigan's Jim McKeever won the inaugural award in 1958, while Henry Downey of the Lavey club received player of the year for his performances in helping Derry win the 1993 All-Ireland Senior Football Championship.

1958: Jim McKeever
1993: Henry Downey

=== GPA Gaelic Football Team of the Year ===
From 2006 onwards, the Gaelic Players Association has chosen its own team of the year.

2007: Paddy Bradley

=== International rules representatives ===
A number of Derry players have been selected to play international rules football for the Ireland team against Australia; both in the test games (1984, 1986, 1987 and 1990) and since the commencement of the International Rules Series in 1998. Note that the table is incomplete.

Player	Appearances	Years
Seán Marty Lockhart	16	1998 (2), 1999 (2), 2000 (2), 2001 (2), 2003 (2), 2004 (2), 2005 (2), 2006 (2)
Anthony Tohill	8	1998 (2), 1999 (2), 2000 (2), 2001 (2)
Paddy Bradley	2	2008 (2)
Dermot McNicholl	9	1984 (3), 1986 (3), 1987 (3)
Brian McGilligan	6	1986 (3) 1987 (3)
Tony Scullion	4	1987 (1) 1990 (3)

== Player statistics ==
=== Championship ===
==== Championship top scorers ====
- End of 2019 championship
- 100+ points total

Player	Debut	Opposition	Appearances	Goals	Points	Final game	Opposition	Total score
Paddy Bradley	14/05/2000	Cavan	51	17	202	30/06/2012	Longford	253
Sean O'Connell	09/06/1957	Antrim	38	12	120	25/06/1976	Cavan	156
Anthony Tohill	30/06/1991	Down	52	4	128	28/06/2003	Dublin	140
Enda Gormley	01/06/1986	Tyrone	34	2	118	02/07/2000	Antrim	124
Mark Lynch	24/07/2004	Limerick	54	6	101	09/06/2018	Kildare	119
Enda Muldoon	01/06/1997	Monaghan	54	11	84	23/07/2011	Kildare	117

==== Championship appearances ====
- End of 2019 championship
- 50+ appearances

Player	Debut	Opposition	Appearances	Final game	Opposition
Enda Muldoon	01/06/1997	Monaghan	54	23/07/2011	Kildare
Mark Lynch	24/07/2004	Limerick	54	09/06/2018	Kildare
Anthony Tohill	30/06/1991	Down	52	28/06/2003	Dublin
Paddy Bradley	14/05/2000	Cavan	51	30/06/2012	Longford
Seán Marty Lockhart	02/06/1996	Armagh	50	18/07/2009	Donegal

==== Championship single score ====
- End of 2019 Championship
- 10+ Points Total

Player	Date	Opposition	Goals	POints	Total
Paddy Bradley	05/06/2005	Monaghan	1	10	13
Paddy Bradley	15/07/2006	Longford	2	7	13
Brendan Kelly	19/06/1977	Tyrone	2	5	11
Paddy Bradley	12/06/2004	Wicklow	1	8	11
Micky Niblock	25/07/1971	Down	2	4	10

==== Championship season score ====
- End of 2019 championship
- 30+ points total

Player	First game	Opposition	Appearances	Goals	Points	Final game	Opposition	Total score
Paddy Bradley	09/05/2004	Tyrone	7	2	38	29/08/2004	Kerry	44
Paddy Bradley	05/06/2005	Monaghan	5	2	29	06/08/2005	Laois	35
Enda Muldoon	19/05/2004	Tyrone	7	3	24	29/08/2004	Kerry	33

=== National League ===
==== NFL top scorers ====
- End of 2019 National League
- 100+ points total

Player	Debut	Opposition	Appearances	Goals	Points	Final game	Opposition	Total score
Paddy Bradley	31/10/1999	Mayo	85	14	324	08/04/12	Westmeath	366
Sean O'Connell	15/09/1957	Antrim	84	25	242	02/05/1976	Dublin	317
Anthony Tohill	27/10/1991	Meath	72	14	155	31/03/2002	Down	197
Enda Gormley	13/10/1985	Antrim	62	7	164	15/04/201	Fermanagh	185
Joe Brolly	07/10/1990	Cavan	63	12	138	11/04/1999	Cork	174
Mark Lynch	06/02/2005	Meath	80	8	145	25/03/2018	Sligo	169
James Kielt	01/02/2009	Mayo	54	5	125	25/03/2018	Sligo	140
Conleith Gilligan	20/05/2000	Meath	54	6	106	25/03/2012	Louth	124
Eoin Bradley	02/06/2005	Meath	56	4	106	03/04/2016	Armagh	118
Brendan Kelly	20/10/1674	Tyrone	37	5	89	02/05/1976	Dublin	104
JE Mullan	17/03/1940	Sligo	39	18	46	13/05/1955	Armagh	100

==== NFL appearances ====
- End of 2019 NFL
- 80+ appearances

Player	Debut	Opposition	Appearances	Final game	Opposition
Tony Scullion	13/02/1983	Armagh	95	05/05/1996	Donegal
Kieran McKeever	31/01/1988	Monaghan	89	08/04/2001	Cavan
Paddy Bradley	31/10/1999	Mayo	85	08/04/2012	Westmeath
Sean O'Connell	15/09/1957	Mayo	84	02/05/1976	Dublin
Mark Lynch	06/02/2005	Meath	80	25/03/2018	Sligo

==== NFL single score ====
- End of 2019 League
- 10+ Points Total

Player	Date	Opposition	Goals	Points	Total
Paddy Bradley	07/03/2004	Waterford	3	9	18
Paddy Bradley	03/04/2005	Tipperary	1	13	16
Matt Regan	29/10/1939	Tyrone	5	0	15
Sean O'Connell	12/03/1967	Armagh	4	3	15
JE Mullan	16/09/1951	Fermanagh	2	5	11
Paddy Bradley	23/02/2003	Monaghan	3	2	11
Mark Lynch	16/03/2014	Dublin	1	8	11
Emmett Bradley	18/02/2018	Offaly	1	8	11
Shane McGuigan	16/03/2019	Leitrim	2	5	11
Sean O'Connell	05/02/1967	Down	3	1	10
Shane McGuigan	23/02/2020	Louth	1	7	10

==== NFL season score ====
- End of 2019 National League
- 50+ points total

Player	First game	Opposition	Appearances	Goals	Points	Final game	Opposition	Total score
Paddy Bradley	06/02/2005	Meath	8	2	44	24/04/2005	Monaghan	50
Mark Lynch	01/02/2014	Tyrone	8	2	44	27/04/2014	Dublin	50

== Management team ==
- Manager: Ciarán Meenagh
- Coach: Gavin Devlin
- Selectors: Enda Muldoon, Paul McFlynn, Murtagh O'Brien
- Lead Athletic Development Coach: Matthew Godfrey

== Honours ==
Official honours, with additions noted.

For more details on this topic including team line-ups, see here

=== National ===
- All-Ireland Senior Football Championship
  - (gold) Winners (1): 1993
  - (silver) Runners-up (1): 1958
- National Football League
  - (gold) Winners (7): 1946–47, 1991–92, 1994–95, 1995–96, 1999–2000, 2008, 2024
  - (silver) Runners-up (6): 1958–59, 1960–61, 1975–76, 1997–98, 2009, 2014
- All-Ireland Under-21 Football Championship
  - (gold) Winners (2): 1968, 1997
- All-Ireland Minor Football Championship
  - (gold) Winners (7): 1965, 1983, 1989, 2002, 2020, 2023, 2024
- All-Ireland Vocational Schools Championship:
  - (gold) Winners (3): 1979, 1980, 1981

=== Provincial ===
- Ulster Senior Football Championship
  - (gold) Winners (9): 1958, 1970, 1975, 1976, 1987, 1993, 1998, 2022, 2023
  - (silver) Runners-up (10): 1921, 1955, 1957, 1971, 1977, 1985, 1992, 1997, 2000, 2011
- Dr McKenna Cup
  - (gold) Winners (13): 1947, 1954, 1958, 1960, 1969, 1970, 1971, 1974, 1993, 1999, 2011, 2023, 2024
- Dr Lagan Cup
  - (gold) Winners (5): 1945, 1947, 1950, 1953, 1959
- Ulster Junior Football Championship
  - (gold) Winners (7): 1945, 1950, 1953, 1955, 1964, 1967, 1969
- Ulster Under-21 Football Championship
  - (gold) Winners (7): 1967, 1968, 1976, 1983, 1986, 1993, 1997
- Ulster Minor Football Championship
  - (gold) Winners (17): 1965, 1969, 1970, 1980, 1981, 1983, 1984, 1989, 1990, 1995, 2000, 2002, 2015, 2017, 2020, 2023, 2024
- Ulster Vocational Schools Championship: ?

?
