= Derry Intermediate Football Championship =

Annual Gaelic football competition

- Irish: Craobh Idirmheánach Peile Dhoire
- Trophy: Sheridan, Bateson and Lee Cup
- Title holders: Desertmartin (1st title)
- Most titles: Craigbane
- Sponsors: M&L Contracts

The Derry Intermediate Football Championship (currently also known for sponsorship reasons as the M&L Contracts Derry Intermediate Football Championship) is an annual competition between the mid-tier Gaelic football clubs affiliated to Derry GAA.

== Format ==
The competition traditionally took the structure of an open-draw knock-out.

In 2007 and 2008, the championship was altered to include a round robin, group structure with the 16 teams divided into four groups. Each club in a group played each other once with the top two in each group advancing to the quarter-finals. From the quarter-finals onwards the competition took the format of a knock-out.

The format was changed once again for the 2009 Championship. The Derry Competitions Control Committee accepted a proposal to scrap the group stage and introduce a "backdoor" system. The 16 clubs play in the first round. In the second round the eight first round winners are drawn against each other, with the four winners going into bowl A for the quarter-finals. The eight first round losers are also drawn against each other and the four winners advance to the quarter-finals (in bowl B). Teams in bowl A are drawn out against teams from bowl B to make up the quarter-final draw. Thereafter the competition is an open-draw knock-out.

== Honours ==
The trophy awarded to the Derry IFC winning team is named after John Bateson (aged 19), James Sheridan (20) and Martin Lee (18), all members of the South Derry Brigade of the Provisional Irish Republican Army who died in an explosion in Magherafelt on 18 December 1971. All three men came from Ballymaguigan and played for the St Trea's GFC Ballymaguigan.

The winners of the Derry Intermediate Championship qualify to represent their county in the Ulster Intermediate Club Football Championship. It is the only team from the county to qualify for this competition. The Derry IFC winner may enter the Ulster Intermediate Club Football Championship at either the preliminary round or the quarter-final stage. They often do well there, with Steelstown (January 2022, following 2021 Derry IFC win), Craigbane (2000 and 2011) and Eoghan Rua, Coleraine (2006) all winning Ulster titles since the turn of the century, after winning the Derry Intermediate Football Championship. The winners can, in turn, go on to play in the All-Ireland Intermediate Club Football Championship, at which it would enter at the semi-final stage, providing it hasn't been drawn to face the British champions in the quarter-finals. Steelstown, for instance, won the 2022 All-Ireland title, after winning the Derry Intermediate Football Championship of the previous year.

== List of finals ==
Ulster Finalists
Also won the Ulster Competition in the same season
Also won the Ulster and All-Ireland Competitions in the same season

Year	Winner	Score	Opponent	Score	Venue	Winning captain
1971	Ballymaguigan	1-05	Greenlough	1-02		
1972	Swatragh		Dungiven			
1973	Ballinascreen III					
1974	Glack		Drum			
1975	Kilrea					Sean O'Neill
1976	Greenlough		Faughanvale			
1977	Glenullin		Desertmartin			
1978	Faughanvale	? R 0-10	Ballinascreen B	? R 0-01		Donal McElhinney
1979	Swatragh					
1980	Glen		Drumsurn			
1981	Faughanvale	0-13	Ballymaguigan	2-04		Donal McElhinney
1982	Slaughtneil					
1983	Glen		Drum			
1984	Moneymore		Drum			
1985	Foreglen	1–10	Desertmartin	1-06		
1986	Craigbane	0-11	An Lúb	1-03		
1987	Craigbane	2-05 R 0-11	Claudy	1-08 R 0-09		
1988	Slaughtmanus	0-07 R 0-08	Ballerin	0-07 R 1-04		
1989	Limavady	0-07	Faughanvale	0-06		
1990	Bellaghy	0-06 R 4-09	Faughanvale	0-06 R 0-09		
1991	Drumsurn	1-14	Desertmartin	2-08		
1992	Craigbane	3-11	Magilligan	0-07		
1993	Ballymaguigan	0-09	Dungiven	1-05		
1994	An Lúb	0-13	Desertmartin	1-08		
1995	Craigbane	1-08	Banagher	1-07		
1996	Faughanvale	0-11	Craigbane	0-10		
1997	Craigbane	0-15	Claudy	1-05		
1998	Faughanvale	0-09	Claudy	0-08		
1999	Faughanvale	1-10	Drumsurn	0-10		
2000	Craigbane	1-17	Newbridge	1-08		
2001	Ballymaguigan	1–12	Moneymore	0-06		
2002	Newbridge					
2003	Ballymaguigan	0–13	Desertmartin	0–12		
2004	Foreglen*					
2005	Claudy		Eoghan Rua			
2006	Eoghan Rua		Foreglen			
2007	Newbridge		Foreglen			
2008	Greenlough	1–10	Ballymaguigan	0-09		
2009	Ballymaguigan	2-08	Greenlough	0–12		
2010	Castledawson	0–11	Steelstown	0–10		
2011	Craigbane	0-09	Swatragh	0-08		
2012	Swatragh		Foreglen			
2013	Foreglen	3-09	Glen Maghera	1–11		
2014	Castledawson	0-07	Slaughtmanus	0-06		
2015	Greenlough	2–17	Craigbane	0-09		
2016	Castledawson	0–15	Steelstown	1–11		
2017	Newbridge	1-09	Faughanvale	1-04		
2018	Banagher	1–12	Ballymaguigan	1-08		
2019	Foreglen	0–15	Claudy	0-09		
2020	Greenlough	1–12	Steelstown	1-08		
2021	Steelstown	0-09	Greenlough	0-08		
2022	Glenullin	0–15	Drumsurn	1–11		Brian Mullan
2023	Glenullin	2-11 A.E.T	Banagher	1-11 A.E.T		Neil McNicholl Traglach Bradley
2024	Ballinderry	1-13 R 0-13	Faughanvale	2-10 R 0-10		Gareth McKinless
2025	Glenullin	2-16	Foreglen	2-13		Daniel O'Kane Traglach Bradley
2026	Desertmartin	0-17	Greenlough	1-11	Celtic Park	

- The 2004 final went unplayed, Foreglen were awarded that year's title.

== Wins listed by club ==
#	Club	Wins	Years won	Runner Up	Years Runner Up
1	Craigbane	7	1986 1987 1992 1995 1997 2002 2011	2	1996 2015
2	Faughanvale	5	1978 1981 1996 1998 1999	5	1976 1989 1990 2017 2024
	Ballymaguigan	5	1971 1993 2001 2003 2009	3	1981 2008 2018
3	Foreglen	4	1985 2004 2013 2019	4	2006 2007 2012 2025
	Greenlough	4	1976 2008 2015 2020	3	1971 2009 2021
	Glenullin	4	1977 2022 2023 2025	0	
4	Newbridge	3	2002 2007 2018	1	2000
	Swatragh	3	1972 1979 2012	1	2011
	Castledawson	3	2010 2014 2016	0	
5	Glen	2	1980 1983	1	2013
6	Claudy	1	2005	4	1987 1997 1998 2019
	Drumsurn	1	1991	3	1980 1999 2022
	Steelstown	1	2020	3	2010 2016 2020
	Banagher	1	2018	2	1995 2023
	Loup	1	1994	1	1986
	Moneymore	1	1984	1	2001
	Slaughtmanus	1	1988	1	2014
	Eoghan Rua	1	2006	1	2005
	Ballinascreen III	1	1973	0	
	Glack	1	1974	0	
	Kilrea	1	1975	0	
	Slaughtniel	1	1982	0	
	Limavady	1	1989	0	
	Bellaghy	1	1990	0	
	Ballinderry	1	2024	0	
	Desertmartin	1	2026	5	1977 1985 1991 1994 2003
	Drum	0		3	1974 1983 1984
	Dungiven	0		2	1972 1993
	Ballinascreen B	0		1	1978
	Ballerin	0		1	1988
	Magilligan	0		1	1992
