= Dermot McNicholl =

Irish former Gaelic footballer (born 1965)

Personal information
- Born: 6 November 1965 (age 60) County Londonderry, Northern Ireland
- Occupation: Teacher
- Height: 5 ft 10 in (178 cm)

Sport
- Sport: Gaelic football
- Position: Half forward
Club
Years	Club	Apps (scores)
?–?	Glenullin	?
Club titles
- Derry titles: 1
Inter-county
Years	County	Apps (scores)
1983–?	Derry	?
Inter-county titles
- Ulster titles: 2
- All-Irelands: 1
- NFL: 3
- All Stars: 1

Dermot McNicholl (born 6 November 1965) is an Irish former Gaelic footballer who played for the Derry county team in the 1980s and 1990s. He was part of Derry's 1993 All-Ireland Championship winning side, also winning Ulster Senior Football Championships in 1987 and 1993. An All Star winner, he usually played in the half-forward line and was regarded as one of the best footballers in Ireland at a time.

McNicholl is from Glenullin, County Londonderry, Northern Ireland, and played club football with John Mitchel's GAC Glenullin, where he won a Derry Senior Football Championship in 1985. He was described by former Derry teammate Fergal McCusker as "impossible to mark". He managed home-club Glenullin in 2009.

== Football career ==
=== School/college career ===
McNicholl attended school at St Patrick's College, Maghera. He played in five consecutive MacRory Cup finals (1980–1984), winning four of them. He was only in third year when playing on his first MacRory team. In 1980 and 1984 he was runner-up in the Hogan Cup to Carmelite College, Moate and St Jarlath's College, Tuam respectively. At university he won three Sigerson Cup and two Ryan Cup medals with UUJ. McNicholl was once asked by Adrian McGuckin what did he learn at school, McNicholl replied, "I learned how to kick a ball."

=== Club career ===
Despite being only 19 at the time, McNicholl captained Glenullin to their 1985 Derry Senior Football Championship success. Prior to this he had won two Derry Minor Football Championships with the club in 1981 and 1982. In 2007 he was awarded a Northern Bank Ulster Minor Club Football All Star, being recognised as one of the best players to ever have competed in the Ulster Minor Club Football Championship, in the competition's 25th year. He also won U-14 and U-16 Derry Championships with Glenullin.

McNicholl was in the United States for a short period the early 1990s and while there played with St Columbkille's GFC, Boston. He along with fellow Derry man Éamonn Burns helped the club win a Boston Senior Football Championship in 1991.

=== Inter-county career ===
McNicholl was known as one of Derry GAA's best ever underage players. He played Minor football for Derry for four years from 1980 (when he was 14) to 1983. He won three Ulster Minor Football Championships (1980, 1981 and 1983) and played in All-Ireland Minor Championship finals in those years, winning in 1983, where he was captain. He also won three Ulster Under-21 Football Championships in 1983, 1985 and 1986 and was runner-up in 1983 and 1985 in the All-Ireland Under-21 Championships.

McNicholl made his Senior debut against Louth in the National League in October, 1983, while still a Minor. He won an All Star for his performances in the 1984 Championship, while still at school and is the youngest ever recipient of an All Star.

He won an Ulster Senior Championship in 1987, but was badly affected by a hamstring injury during the All-Ireland semi-final defeat to Meath. He missed the 1989 and 1990 campaigns due to being in Australia playing professional Australian rules football. He was part of Derry's National League winning team in 1992. McNicholl added a second Ulster Senior Championship medal in 1993, before going on to win the 1993 All-Ireland Championship after a semi-final victory over Dublin and final defeat of Cork. Injury prevented him from starting these two games, but came on as a substitute in both. He won a further two National League medals in 1995 and 1996. He was plagued by injury in the latter years of his career, often preventing him from starting matches and was forced to retire soon after.

=== International and Australian rules career ===
Dermot McNicholl represented Ireland in three International Rules Series, firstly in 1984. He was so impressive during the 1987 series that Victoria Football Association (VFA) club Prahran enticed him to move to Melbourne in October 1989. Two weeks later, St Kilda drafted him with the 99th selection in the 1988 VFL draft, one of the first three Irish players to be drafted. He spent the 1989 season playing for Prahran, before injury forced him to miss the first half of the 1990 season, after which he recovered and made his senior debut for St Kilda. He played three senior games before returning to Ireland to complete his university studies.

In 2008 Australian Football League agent Ricky Nixon recruited McNicholl as one of four Irish scouts to look for talented young Gaelic football players for possible recruitment to AFL teams.

== Management career ==
McNicholl teaches at St Patrick's College, Maghera, and has managed many of the school's teams at different age levels since 1994, helping them to four MacRory and three Hogan Cups successes. He was involved with Slaughtneil Minors for two years and during that time they won the Derry Minor Football Championship twice (1998 and 1999) and also won the 1998 Ulster Minor Club Championship (and finished runners up in 1999).

At Senior level he has also been involved with Dungiven and Tyrone club Ardboe. After a three-year break from club management, McNicholl was confirmed as new Glenullin manager at the club's Annual General Meeting on 4 January 2009. He guided the club to victory over reigning champions Ballinderry in the quarter-finals of the 2009 Derry Senior Football Championship. They were however defeated by Dungiven in the semi-final stage. It was announced in December 2009 that he would not be seeking another term with the club.

== Honours ==
=== County ===
- All-Ireland Senior Football Championship - Winner (1): 1993
- National Football League - Winner (3): 1992, 1995, 1996
- Ulster Senior Football Championship - Winner (2): 1987, 1993
- Ulster Senior Football Championship - Runner up: 1985, 1992
- Dr McKenna Cup - Winner (1): 1993
- All-Ireland Under-21 Football Championship - Runner up: 1983, 1985
- Ulster Under-21 Football Championship - Winner (3): 1983, 1985, 1986
- All-Ireland Minor Football Championship - Winner (1): 1983
- All-Ireland Minor Football Championship - Runner up: 1980, 1981
- Ulster Minor Football Championship - Winner (3): 1980, 1981, 1983

=== Club ===
- Derry Senior Football Championship- Winner (1): 1985
- Boston Senior Football Championship - Winner (1): 1991
- Derry Minor Football Championship - Winner (2): 1981, 1982
- Numerous underage awards including U-14 and U-16 Derry Championships

=== Province ===
- Railway Cup - Winner (?): Years?

=== College ===
- Sigerson Cup - Winner (3): 1986, 1987, 1991
- Ryan Cup - Winner (2): Years?
- Hogan Cup - Runner-up: 1980, 1984
- MacRory Cup - Winner (4): 1980, 1982, 1983, 1984
- MacRory Cup - Runner-up: 1981

=== Individual ===
- All Star - Winner (1): 1984
- All Star - Nominated: ?
- Captain Derry Minor Ulster and All-Ireland winning side: 1983
- Captain Glenullin Derry Championship winning side: 1985
- Represented Ireland in three International Rules series: 1984, other years?
