= Faughanvale GAC =

Derry-based Gaelic games club

St Mary's Faughanvale GAA
- CLG Naomh Muire Nuachongbháil
- Founded: 1933
- County: Derry
- Nickname: Vale
- Colours: Green and white
- Grounds: John McLaughlin Park (Páirc An Seán Mac Lochlainn)
- Coordinates: 55°02′10″N 7°06′11″W

Playing kits
Standard colours

Saint Mary's Faughanvale GAA (Irish: CLG Naomh Muire Nuachongbháil) is a Gaelic Athletic Association club based in Greysteel, County Londonderry, Northern Ireland. The club is a member of the Derry GAA and currently cater for Gaelic football, Ladies' Gaelic football.

Faughanvale have won the Derry Intermediate Football Championship five times and the Derry Junior Football Championship once. The club's catchment area includes Greysteel, Eglinton, Ballykelly, Enagh, Highlands and parts of Glack. Underage teams up to U-12's play in North Derry league and championships, from U-14 upwards teams compete in All-Derry competitions.

== History ==
St Mary's GAC Faughanvale was established in 1933. A camogie team was founded in 1946 and affiliated to the club, before folding in 1989.

The club's first major success came in 1943 when they won the North Derry Senior Football Championship, before losing to Lavey in the All-Derry Senior Championship final. In 1975 Faughanvale won the Derry Junior Football Championship. Faughanvale lost the 1976 Intermediate Final to Greenlough. Three years later St Mary's won the Derry Intermediate Football Championship and have won the competition a further four times since (1981, 1996, 1998, 1999) and got to the final a further four times (1989, 1990, 2017, 2024). Faughanvale was awarded "Irish News Rural Club of the Year 2005" by The Irish News. In 2014, Faughanvale were relegated from the Intermediate league. In 2015, for the first time in 40 years, they competed at Junior Level. In 2015 Faughanvale won a treble of Neil Carlin Cup, Division 3 League, and their second Derry Junior Championship. After this Junior Championship win they were promoted to the Intermediate Championship for the 2016 season. In the 2017, season they reached the Intermediate Championship final however they lost out to Newbridge. In the subsequent years, Faughanvale were seen as a "nearly team" with a lot of youth coming through of the back of their U21 teams but never making that push to the final. Their closest run after 2017 came in 2019 where they took eventual champions Foreglen to a replay but subsequently lost. After a relegation scare in 2023 where they played parish rivals Slaughtmanus in a play-off final, new managers were brought in. In the 2024 season, they got promoted to the Senior league for the first time in over 30 years and got to the Intermediate final where they played Ballinderry in the final. After an entertaining final which ended in a draw after a controversial decision, they lost to Ballinderry in the replay. They were promoted to the Derry Senior Football Championship for 2025. They played Steelstown in their first senior championship match in over 30 years which they lost. A win against Drumsurn sequered their status for the 2026 championship however they lost to Bellaghy in the next round.

The club purchased its current grounds in 1982. Before this, football was played at the O'Neill family's field on the Clooney Road. When the new pitch opened in 1983, it was named after one of the founding club members and former chairman of the Derry County Board, John McLaughlin. In May 2007, the club began a £1.2million redevelopment of their playing facilities at John McLaughlin Park and opened the new grounds in May 2009.

In 2008, the club took part in the Celebrity Bainisteoir programme and were managed by journalist Nell McCafferty.

Notable club members include Paul Bradley who won an All-Ireland minor medal with Derry in 1983, captained Derry minors to Ulster success in 1984 and who won a Sigerson medal with St Mary's University College Belfast in 1989. Stephen Mulvenna won an All-Ireland senior medal with Derry in 1993.

== Teams ==
=== Gaelic football ===
Faughanvale fields Gaelic football teams at U8, U10, U12, U14, U16, Minor, Reserve and Senior levels. They currently compete in the Derry Intermediate Championship. Having won Division 4 of the Derry ACFL in 2007, in 2008 they maintained their position in Division 3 in 2009.

=== Ladies' Gaelic football ===
As well as Minor and Senior Ladies' football teams, St Mary's fields U12, U14 and U16 teams.

Faughanvale ladies have won the intermediate championship on 6 occasions 2003, 2006, 2011, 2014, 2018 & 2020.

=== Hurling and camogie ===
The camogie and hurling teams ceased playing in 1989.

== Football titles ==
=== Senior football ===
- Ulster Junior Club Football Championship : 0
  - Runners-up 2015
- Derry Senior Football Championship : 0
  - Runners-up 1943
- North Derry Senior Football Championship: 1
  - 1943
- Derry Intermediate Football Championship: 5
  - 1978, 1981, 1996, 1998, 1999
  - Runners-up 1976, 1989, 1990, 2017, 2024
- Derry Junior Football Championship: 2
  - 1975, 2015
  - Runners-Up 1959
- Dr Kerlin Cup: 3
  - 1943, 1947, 1950 (shared with Dungiven)
- Derry City Junior Football Championship*
  - 1958

=== U21 Football ===
- U21 A Football Championsip
  - Runners-up 2017, 2018
- U21 B Football Championship
  - 2016, 2019

=== Minor Football ===
- Derry City Minor Football Championship: 1
  - 1959
  - Runners-Up 1958
- Derry All County Minor 'B' Championship:
  - 2013

== Ladies' football titles ==
=== Ladies Senior Football ===
- Derry Ladies' Football Championship: 5
  - 2006, 2012, 2014, 2018, 2020.

== See also ==
- Derry Intermediate Football Championship
- List of Gaelic games clubs in Derry
