= Craigbane GAC =

Derry-based Gaelic games club

St Joseph's GAC Craigbane
- CLG Naomh Seosamh An Charraigbhan
- Founded: 1972
- County: Derry
- Nickname: Lily Whites
- Colours: Green and white
- Grounds: Páirc Gheárod Uí Chrosaín
- Coordinates: 54°52′03.76″N 7°08′47.07″W

Playing kits
Standard colours

Saint Joseph's GAC Craigbane (Irish: CLG Naomh Seosamh An Charraigbhan) is a Gaelic Athletic Association club based in Craigbane, County Londonderry, Northern Ireland. The club is a member of the Derry GAA and currently cater for both Gaelic football and Ladies' Gaelic football.

Underage teams up to U-12's play in North Derry league and championships, from U-14 upwards teams compete in All-Derry competitions.

== Gaelic football ==
Craigbane fields Gaelic football teams at U8, U10, U12, U14, U16, Minor, Reserve and Senior levels. The club's biggest success came in 2001 and 2011 when they won the Ulster Intermediate Club Football Championship. They have also won the Derry Intermediate Football Championship on seven occasions. They also won the u15 Feile Na Nog in 2023.

== History ==
The first officially formed Gaelic football club in Craigbane was Lamh Dearg, which was established in 1934. They played in the North Derry League and lost to Claudy in their first game. Lamh Dearg soon folded, but a Craigbane team was reformed in 1959 under the guidance of Ryan Shapman. Their first game was a 4–18 to 0–02 victory over Claudy.

The present club, St Joseph's GAC Craigbane came into existence in 1972 under the leadership of Gerry Crossan. The side played in Division 4 and their first game was a victory away to Coleraine. St. Joseph's were runners up to Drum in the 1973 Derry Junior Football Championship and won Division 4 the following year. At the end of the 1975 season, Craigbane were promoted to Senior football for the first time. Their first game in Division 1 was a defeat against Glen on a 2–09 to 1–09 scoreline. Craigbane were relegated to Division 2 for the 1977 season and were back playing Intermediate football for the next five years.

In 1983 Eddie McElhinney became the first Craigbane player to win an All-Ireland medal went he was Center Half Forward on the Derry minor side that won the All-Ireland Minor Football Championship against Cork. Craigbane first Championship trophy came in 1985 when they beat Claudy in the Derry Intermediate Reserve Championship final. They won the cup again two years later. 1986 was a successful year where they won the Derry Intermediate Football Championship and the Dr Kerlin Cup, beating An Lúb and Faughanvale in the respective finals. They also won the League Division 2. The following year Craigbane became the first ever Derry club to retain the Intermediate Championship when they beat Claudy after a replay. The club finished joint top of Division 2.

St Joseph's current pitch, Páirc Gheárod Uí Chrosaín, was officially opened by GAA President Peter Quinn (GAA President) and blessed by Bishop Daly on 13 May 1990. The club won the Intermediate Championship for a third team in 1992 and the team also won the 1994 Dr Kerlin Cup. Craigbane beat Banagher in the 1995 Intermediate Championship final and in the Bishop's Cup final. 1997 saw Craigbane win five trophies. They defeated Claudy in the Intermediate Championship final at Celtic Park. The club also won the Dr. Kerlin Cup, the Bishops Cup and Division 2. The Reserves also won the Grade B Championship defeating Drumsurn at Claudy. 2000 saw the club win their sixth Derry Intermediate Championship. They went on to win the 2001 Ulster Intermediate Club Football Championship, their greatest success to date, defeating Inniskeen of Monaghan in the final.

== Honours ==
=== Senior ===
- Ulster Intermediate Club Football Championship: 2
  - 2001, 2011
- Derry Intermediate Football Championship: 7
  - 1986, 1987, 1992, 1995, 1997, 2000, 2011
- Derry Intermediate Football League: 3
  - 1986, 1997, 2011
- Derry Football League Division Four: 1
  - 1974
- Bishops Cup 2
  - 1995, 1997
- Dr Kerlin Cup 6
  - 1986, 1994, 1997, 1998, 2006, 2009
- James O'Hagan Cup 1
  - 2003
- Derry Football League Division Three: 1
  - 2022
- Derry Junior Football Championship: 1
  - 2022, 2024

=== Reserves ===
- Derry Intermediate Reserve Football Championship: 4
  - 1985, 1987, 1997, 2026
- Derry Junior Reserve Football Championship: 1
  - 2021
  - 2024

=== Minor ===
- North Derry Minor Football Championship: 1
  - 1994

== See also ==
- Derry Senior Football Championship
- List of Gaelic games clubs in Derry
