= St Malachy's GAA =

St Malachy's GAA may refer to:

- Edendork St Malachy's GAC, a sports club
- Moortown St Malachy's GAC, a sports club

== See also ==
- Armagh Harps GFC, a descendant of a sports club named St Malachy's which existed in the 1940s
- Castledawson GAC, a sports club occasionally referred to as St Malachy's
- Castlewellan GAC, a sports club occasionally referred to as St Malachy's
