= John Mitchel's GAC Claudy =

Derry-based Gaelic games club

- CLG Seán Uí Mhisteil Clóidigh
- Founded: 1888
- County: Derry
- Colours: Blue and White
- Grounds: Páirc Uí Néill
- Coordinates: 54°54′32.48″N 7°08′48.04″W

Playing kits
Standard colours

John Mitchel's GAC Claudy (Irish: CLG Seán Uí Mhisteil Clóidigh) is a Gaelic Athletic Association club based in Claudy, County Londonderry, Northern Ireland. The club is a member of Derry GAA and currently caters for Gaelic football. The club is named after Irish patriot and revolutionary John Mitchel, as is that in Glenullin in the same county. John Mitchel's Claudy GAC is the oldest club in County Londonderry and celebrated its 125th anniversary in 2013.

Claudy fields boys' and girls' football teams at Under-6, U-8 and U-10; boys'/men's teams at U-12, U-14, U-16, Minor, Reserve and Senior levels; and ladies teams at Under-12, U-14, U-16 and Senior levels. Underage teams up to U-12s play in North Derry league and championships, from U-14 upwards teams compete in All-Derry competitions. The club currently competes in the Derry Senior Football Championship and Division 1 of the Derry All-County Football League.

== History ==
The North Derry County Board held a meeting in St Patrick's Hall, Claudy in 1921, but was forced to disperse after coming under gun attack from the A Specials. Many GAA members were interned without trial. This had the effect of bringing Gaelic games in the area to a standstill.

In the early 1930s Alfie Devine from the village tried to encourage the establishment of the GAA in Claudy and also tried to organise a North Derry County Board. John Mitchel's GAC was founded and the opening game was played in July 1934 against Craigbane Lamh Dhearg. The North Derry Board was formed in 1936. After being a member of the North Derry Board for a short while, the club affiliated to the Derry City Board in 1935. In 1946 the club moved back to the North Derry Board.

Mitchel's first major success came in 1957 when they won the Dr Kerlin Cup, defeating Ballerin, who won the Derry Senior Football Championship that year. The club won the North Derry Minor Football Championship two years later, before being beaten by Magherafelt in the All-Derry Minor Championship final.

The 1960s proved to be one of Claudy's most successful decades ever. In that time they won the North Derry Senior Football League a few times, Neal Carlin Cup, Mahon Cup and reached a Derry Senior Championship semi-final, where they were beaten by Newbridge.

The club's biggest success came in 2005 when they defeated Eoghan Rua in the final of the Derry Intermediate Football Championship.

== Football titles ==
=== Adult ===
- Derry Intermediate Football League: 1
  - 2019
- Derry Intermediate Football Championship: 1
  - 2005
- Derry Junior Football Championship: 1
  - 1983
- Dr Kerlin Cup 7
  - 1957, 1970, 1975, 1985, 1990, 2013, 2015

=== Under 21s ===
- Harry O'Kane Cup (North derry) 2
  - 2013, 2014

=== Reserve ===
- Derry Intermediate Reserve Football Championship: 3
  - 2000, 2007, 2019

=== Minor ===
- North Derry Minor 'A' Football Championship: 2
  - 1992, 1999
- North Derry Minor 'A' Football League: 4
  - 1990, 1991, 1999, 2000
- North Derry Minor 'B' Football Championship: 2
  - 2007
- North Derry Minor 'B' Football League: 1
  - 2001
- Carlin Duffy Cup: 1
  - 2012
- Derry Minor 'B' Football league:2
  - 2013,2014
- Derry Minor 'B' Football Championship:2
  - 2014, 2018

== Notable footballers ==
- Patsy Gormley - Goalkeeper on Derry's 1958 All-Ireland Senior Football Championship runners-up side.

== See also ==
- List of Gaelic games clubs in Derry
