= Drumsurn GAC =

Derry-based Gaelic games club

St Matthew's GAC Drumsurn
- CLG Naomh Maitiú Droim Soirn
- Founded: 1927
- County: Derry
- Colours: Red and white
- Grounds: Billy Doran Park, Drumsurn
- Coordinates: 54°59′18.38″N 6°51′54.23″W

Playing kits
Standard colours

Saint Matthew's Gaelic Athletic Club (Irish: CLG Naomh Maitiú Droim Soirn) is a Gaelic Athletic Association club based in Drumsurn, County Londonderry, Northern Ireland. The club is affiliated to Derry GAA and currently competes in gaelic football and camogie.

Underage teams up to U-12s play in North Derry league and championships, from U-14 upwards teams compete in All-Derry competitions. Drumsurn fields Gaelic football teams at U-8, U-10, U-12, U-14 and Senior levels. They currently compete in the Derry Intermediate Championship and Division 1B of the Derry Senior ACFL. Some Notable Players from Drumsurn GAC is Cahir McGowan famously known for scoring 1-12 playing as Corner Forward Against Glenullin in the Intermediate Championship Semi-Final in 1991. The U-16 and Minor teams are amalgamated with Drum and play as St Patrick's.

== History ==
Glenullin won the 1927 North Derry Championship, but were disqualified from the All-County Championship final after their final with Ballinderry was abandoned due to fighting. A team from Drumsurn took their place in the re-played final, but were beaten by Ballinderry in the decider. There were a few stop-starts over the next 13 years before Drumsurn ceased to function as a club in 1940, after players moved to other clubs since Drumsurn did not enter the 1940 championship. In 1947 John Eddie Mullan from Drumsurn won a National Football League medal with Derry.

Interest in Gaelic football in North Derry was once again very high after Derry reached the 1958 All-Ireland Senior Championship final. The current club was founded that year and played in red jerseys, with white collars and a green shamrock on the breast. Their first Senior match came was a victory over Glenullin in the 1959 Neal Carlin Cup. 1960 saw Drumsurn win the North Derry Junior Championship for the first time. They went on to play the Derry City Champions Faughanavale in the All-County Junior Championship semi-final at Celtic Park, but were defeated. The club also won the following year's North Derry Junior Championship.

In 1965 Drumsurn's Seán Moore won an All-Ireland medals with Derry Minors. During this time the club also purchased their current playing field. In 1966 St Matthews's won the Mahon Cup and Neal Carlin Cup with victories over Ardmore and Glenullin respectively.

St Matthew's best ever performance in the Derry Senior Football Championship came in 1968 when they reached the semi-final stage. Joe Chivers from the club was part of the 1968 Derry All-Ireland U21 Football Championship winning team. The club added another Neal Carlin Cup success in 1979. In 1980 the club won Division 2 of the league and were narrowly defeated in the Derry Intermediate Football Championship final by Glen. That year the club were awarded an Allied Irish Bank Club of the Year award.

Joe Irwin, who had returned to the club from Swatragh in 1978, established himself on the Derry side in the 1980s and won Railway Cup medals with Ulster in 1983 and 1984, captaining Derry in 1984. Drumsurn's greatest success came in 1991 went they won the Derry Intermediate Football Championship against St Martins Desertmartin. Drumsurn's Ciarán Mullan was a pillar of the 2002 Derry minor team which won the All-Ireland Minor Championship; notably scoring 1 goal and 5 points in a remarkable 'man of the match' performance in the semi-final against longford. He continues to be one of the most influential members of the club's senior team and is one of the most feared forwards in the intermediate league.

== Football titles ==
- Derry Intermediate Football Championship (1)
  - 1991
- Derry Division 2 league (2)
  - 2021, 1989
- Neal Carlin Cup (3?)
  - 1966, 1979, 2003
- Dr Kerlin Cup
  - 1992
- Derry Junior Reserve Football Championship (1?)
  - 2003
- North Derry Minor 'B' Football League (1)
  - 2004
- Carlin/Duffy Cup (2?)
  - 2004, 2005

=== Notable players ===
- Joe Irwin – Former Derry footballer. Member of Derry's 1987 Ulster Senior Football Championship winning team. Captained Derry in 1984. Won Railway Cup medals in 1983 and 1984.
- Richard Ferris – Member of Derry's 1993 All-Ireland winning squad, featuring in the first two matches in the Ulster Championship.
- Ciarán Mullan, Derry Minor and Senior player
- John Eddie Mullan – Former Derry player. While he played most of his club football for Dungiven, he started out his career with Drumsurn, playing for the club in 1940–1942.
- Eunan Rafferty – Former Derry footballer.

== Facilities ==
Drumsurn moved to their current location in 1962, before this they played on EC O'Connor's field. A new hall was opened in 1988 and a new training pitch opened in 2004.

== See also ==
- Derry Intermediate Football Championship
- List of Gaelic games clubs in Derry
