= Patsy Gormley =

Northern Irish Gaelic footballer (1934–2022)

Personal information
- Native name: Pádraig Ó Garmaile (Irish)
- Born: 8 December 1932 Claudy, Northern Ireland
- Died: 25 August 2022 (aged 89) Wrexham, Wales
- Height: 5 ft 10 in (178 cm)

Sport
- Sport: Gaelic football
- Position: Goalkeeper
Club
- Years: Club
- 1956-1961: Claudy
Club titles
- Derry titles: 0
Inter-county
- Years: County
- Derry
Inter-county titles
- Ulster titles: 1
- All-Irelands: 0
- NFL: 0

Patrick James Gormley (8 December 1932 – 25 August 2022) was a Gaelic footballer from Northern Ireland. At club level he played with Claudy and was also a member of the Derry senior football team. Gormley usually lined out as a goalkeeper.

== Career ==
Gormley first played Gaelic football when he made the school's team as a 14-year-old, before later lining out at adult level with the Claudy club. He first appeared on the inter-county scene with Derry as a member of the minor team in 1952. Gormley claimed his first inter-county silverware when he won an Ulster JFC medal in 1955. This success earned him an immediate call-up to the senior team. Gormley, having earlier won Dr McKenna Cup and Ulster SFC medals, lined out in goal when Derry were beaten by Dublin in the 1958 All-Ireland final.

What was exceptional about Derry’s goalkeeper was that he played at the highest level with only one eye, after losing an eye as a child following an accident on the farm yard.

== Death ==
Gormley died at Wrexham Maelor Hospital in Wales on 25 August 2022, at the age of 89.

== Honours ==
Derry

- Ulster Senior Football Championship: 1958
- Dr McKenna Cup: 1958, 1960
- Ulster Junior Football Championship: 1955
