= Ulster Intermediate Club Football Championship =

Annual Gaelic football tournament

- Irish: Craobh Idirmhéanach Peile Chlub Ulaidh
- Code: Gaelic football
- Founded: 1998 (unofficial); 2004 (official)
- Region: Ulster (GAA)
- Trophy: Patrick McCully Cup
- No. of teams: 9
- Title holders: Glenullin (1st title)
- Most titles: Cookstown Fr. Rock's; Pomeroy; Craigbane (2 titles)
- Sponsors: Allied Irish Banks (AIB)

The Ulster Intermediate Club Football Championship, known for sponsorship reasons as the AIB Ulster Intermediate Club Football Championship and shortened to Ulster Club IFC, is an annual Gaelic football competition organised by Ulster GAA. It is played between the Intermediate championship winners from each of the nine counties of Ulster. The competition has a straight knock-out format. It was first held in 1998 as an unofficial tournament, and was first organised by Ulster GAA in 2004. The winners are awarded the Patrick McCully Cup, named in honour of Clontibret O'Neills stalwart Packie McCully. The winners go on to represent Ulster in the All-Ireland Intermediate Club Football Championship.

Tyrone clubs have won the competition eight times, more than any other county. Craigbane, Pomeroy and Cookstown Fr. Rock's are the only clubs to have won the competition twice. The current champions are Glenullin from Derry.

== List of finals ==
Key to list of winners
†	Winning team reached the final of the All-Ireland Intermediate Club Football Championship
‡	Winning team won the All-Ireland Intermediate Club Football Championship

List of Ulster Intermediate Club Football Championship finals
Year	Winners		Score	Runners-up		Venue	Ref
Year	County	Club	Score	County	Club	Venue	Ref
1998 (Note: Unofficial tournament.)	Down	Liatroim Fontenoys	0–13 – 1–05	Armagh	Culloville Blues	Páirc Uí Néill, Clontibret	
1999	Tyrone	Brackaville	2–10 – 1–13 (aet)	Armagh	St Michael's	Páirc Uí Néill, Clontibret	
1999	Tyrone	Brackaville	1–11 – 1–09 (R)	Armagh	St Michael's	Páirc Uí Néill, Clontibret	
2000	Derry	Craigbane	1–09 – 1–07	Monaghan	Inniskeen Grattans	Páirc Uí Néill, Clontibret	
2001	Donegal	Glenfin	0–13 – 0–10	Tyrone	Dungannon	Páirc Uí Néill, Clontibret	
2002	Monaghan	Sean McDermotts	0–14 – 0–07	Cavan	Drumgoon	Páirc Uí Néill, Clontibret	
2003	Donegal	St Michael's †	1–11 – 0–08	Armagh	Maghery	Páirc Uí Néill, Clontibret	
2004	Tyrone	Pomeroy †	1–13 – 0–07	Antrim	Moneyglass	Casement Park, Belfast	
2005	Monaghan	Inniskeen Grattans ‡	2–05 – 0–10	Donegal	Glenswilly	Brewster Park, Enniskillen	
2006	Derry	Eoghan Rua, Coleraine †	0–08 – 1–05	Armagh	Ballymacnab	O'Neill Park, Dungannon	
2006	Derry	Eoghan Rua, Coleraine †	2–04 – 0–07 (R)	Armagh	Ballymacnab	Casement Park, Belfast	
2007	Cavan	Ballinagh	2–11 – 2–03	Antrim	Dunloy	Healy Park, Omagh	
2008	Tyrone	Trillick	0–08 – 0–07	Derry	Greenlough	Athletic Grounds, Armagh	
2009	Tyrone	Cookstown Fr. Rock's ‡	0–09 – 1–04	Cavan	Lavey	Brewster Park, Enniskillen	
2010	Fermanagh	Lisnaskea Emmetts ‡	0–13 – 1–07	Monaghan	Doohamlet	Breffni Park, Cavan	
2011	Derry	Craigbane	0–06 – 0–05	Armagh	Culloville Blues	Healy Park, Omagh	
2012	Tyrone	Cookstown Fr. Rock's ‡	3–13 – 1–11 (aet)	Down	Warrenpoint	Athletic Grounds, Armagh	
2013	Monaghan	Truagh Gaels ‡	0–17 – 0–12	Tyrone	Eskra	Athletic Grounds, Armagh	
2014	Down	Warrenpoint	1–14 – 1–07	Monaghan	Inniskeen Grattans	Athletic Grounds, Armagh	
2015	Down	Loughinisland	4–01 – 0–07	Donegal	Réalt na Mara	Owenbeg, Dungiven	
2016	Tyrone	Pomeroy	2–16 – 0–10	Monaghan	Donaghmoyne	Páirc Esler, Newry	
2017	Tyrone	Moy ‡	0–09 – 0–08	Down	Rostrevor	Athletic Grounds, Armagh	
2018	Antrim	Naomh Éanna †	2–11 – 1–10	Cavan	Mullahoran	Athletic Grounds, Armagh	
2019	Monaghan	Magheracloone Mitchells †	1–15 – 0–13	Tyrone	Galbally	Athletic Grounds, Armagh	
2020	Competition cancelled due to COVID-19 pandemic						
2021	Derry	Steelstown ‡	0–06 – 0–04	Tyrone	Moortown	Owenbeg, Dungiven	
2022	Tyrone	Galbally †	1–09 – 0–05	Monaghan	Corduff Gaels	Athletic Grounds, Armagh	
2023	Armagh	St Patrick's, Cullyhanna ‡	1–10 – 0–12	Cavan	Ballyhaise	St Tiernach's Park, Clones	
2024	Derry	Ballinderry †	1–12 – 2–08	Cavan	Arva	Healy Park, Omagh	
2025	Derry	Glenullin †	3–15 – 0–19	Cavan	Cuchulainns	St Tiernach's Park, Clones	

== Performances ==
=== By county ===
Performances in the Ulster Intermediate Club Football Championship by county
County	Titles	Runners-up	Years won	Years runners-up
Tyrone	8	4	1999, 2004, 2008, 2009, 2012, 2016, 2017, 2022	2001, 2013, 2019, 2021
Derry	6	1	2000, 2006, 2011, 2021, 2024, 2025	2008
Monaghan	4	5	2002, 2005, 2013, 2019	2000, 2010, 2014, 2016, 2022
Down	3	2	1998, 2014, 2015	2012, 2017
Donegal	2	2	2001, 2003	2005, 2015
Cavan	1	6	2007	2002, 2009, 2018, 2023, 2024, 2025
Armagh	1	5	2023	1998, 1999, 2003, 2006, 2011
Antrim	1	2	2018	2004, 2007
Fermanagh	1	0	2011	—

=== By club ===
Performances in the Ulster Intermediate Club Football Championship by club
Club	Titles	Runners-up	Years won	Years runners-up
Craigbane	2	0	2000, 2011	—
Pomeroy	2	0	2004, 2016	—
Cookstown Fr. Rock's	2	0	2009, 2012	—
Inniskeen Grattans	1	2	2005	2000, 2014
Warrenpoint	1	1	2014	2012
Galbally	1	1	2022	2019
Liatroim Fontenoys	1	0	1998	—
Brackaville	1	0	1999	—
Glenfin	1	0	2001	—
Sean McDermotts	1	0	2002	—
St Michael's (Donegal)	1	0	2003	—
Eoghan Rua, Coleraine	1	0	2006	—
Ballinagh	1	0	2007	—
Trillick	1	0	2008	—
Lisnaskea Emmetts	1	0	2010	—
Truagh Gaels	1	0	2013	—
Loughinisland	1	0	2015	—
Moy	1	0	2017	—
Naomh Éanna	1	0	2018	—
Magheracloone Mitchells	1	0	2019	—
Steelstown	1	0	2021	—
St Patrick's, Cullyhanna	1	0	2023	—
Ballinderry	1	0	2024	—
Glenullin	1	0	2025	—
Culloville Blues	0	2	—	1998, 2011
St Michael's (Armagh)	0	1	—	1999
Dungannon	0	1	—	2001
Drumgoon	0	1	—	2002
Maghery	0	1	—	2003
Moneyglass	0	1	—	2004
Glenswilly	0	1	—	2005
Ballymacnab	0	1	—	2006
Dunloy	0	1	—	2007
Greenlough	0	1	—	2008
Lavey	0	1	—	2009
Doohamlet	0	1	—	2010
Eskra	0	1	—	2013
Réalt na Mara	0	1	—	2015
Donaghmoyne	0	1	—	2016
Rostrevor	0	1	—	2017
Mullahoran	0	1	—	2018
Moortown	0	1	—	2021
Corduff Gaels	0	1	—	2022
Ballyhaise	0	1	—	2023
Arva	0	1	—	2024
Cuchulainns	0	1	—	2025

== See also ==
- Munster Intermediate Club Football Championship
- Leinster Intermediate Club Football Championship
- Connacht Intermediate Club Football Championship
