= St Michael's GAC, Newtownhamilton =

Armagh-based Gaelic games club

- CPG Naomh Micheál, Baile Úr
- Founded: 1932
- County: Armagh
- Colours: Blue and white

Playing kits
Standard colours

St Michael's Gaelic Athletic Club, Newtownhamilton (Irish: CLG Naomh Micheál, Baile Úr) is a GAA club in Armagh. It's playing fields fall within the townland of Tullyvallan, including the village of Newtownhamilton, in south County Armagh. St Michael's plays Gaelic football and is currently in the Armagh Junior Football Championship.

== History ==
The club was founded in 1932.

After a few years of near-misses, the men from Newtown captured the 1939 Junior football championship, marking the beginning of what would go on to be a successful decade. In 1940 St Michael's appeared for the first time in a county Senior final, defeating Crossmaglen by 1-6 to 0-3. The club retained the title in 1941, again defeating Cross. St Michael's added Junior championship titles in 1946 and in 1950 In 1987 St Michael's won the Armagh Junior Football Championship.

St Michael's lost the 1991 Intermediate football final to Granemore. In 1999, St Michael's won its first IFC title, beating CLann Eireann 1-13 to 0-9. The club progressed to the final of the Ulster Intermediate Club Football Championship, losing to Brackaville of Tyrone.

Ten years later, St Michael's regained the county IFC title with a 1-10 to 1-4 victory over Keady.

== Roll of honour ==
- Armagh Senior Football Championship (2)
  - 1940, 1941
- Armagh Intermediate Football Championship (2)
  - 1999, 2009
- Armagh Junior Football Championship (4)
  - 1939, 1946, 1950, 1987
