= Castledawson GAC =

Derry-based Gaelic games club

St Malachy's GAC Castledawson
- An Seanmhullagh
- County: Derry
- Colours: White and Black
- Grounds: The Brough
- Coordinates: 54°46′01.84″N 6°32′13.09″W

Playing kits
Standard colours

Saint Malachy's GAC Castledawson is a Gaelic Athletic Club from Castledawson, County Londonderry, Northern Ireland. The club is a member of Derry GAA and currently competes in gaelic football, hurling and camogie.

== History ==
St Malachy's GAC was set up largely thanks to Paddy Graham from the townland of Tamnadace outside the village. The Graham Cup, a reserve competition for South Derry clubs, is named in his honour. Although a relatively small club, they competed for several years in the Derry senior league.

== Camogie ==
Castledawson fields camogie teams at U10, U12, U14, U16, Minor, and Senior levels.

== Football titles ==
=== Senior ===
- Derry Junior Football Championship: 1
  - 1958
- Larkin Cup: 1
  - 1997
- McGlinchey Cup: 3
  - 2007, 2010, 2013
- Derry Intermediate Football Championship: 3
  - 2010, 2014, 2016
- Graham Cup: 2
  - 2002, 2017

=== Minor ===
- Tommy O'Neill Cup: 1
  - 2006 (shared with Foreglen)
- Minor 'B' Football Championship: 1
  - 2015
- Minor 'B' Football League: 1
  - 2015
- South Derry Minor 'B' Football Championship: 1
  - 2006

== Camogie titles ==
- Derry Senior Camogie Championship: 1
  - 2006

== Notable players ==
- Matt Sonny McCann - Former Derry and Ulster footballer.
- Dermot Heaney - 1993 All-Ireland Championship winning Derry footballer.
- Adrian Heaney - Former Derry Minor, Under 21 and Senior Player who was the Senior team captain
- Seamus Heaney, the 1995 laureate of the Nobel Prize in Literature played as a boy for Castledawson, the club in the area of his birth.

== See also ==
- Derry Senior Football Championship
- List of Gaelic games clubs in Derry
