= Foreglen GAC =

Derry-based Gaelic games club

O'Brien's GAC Foreglen (Irish: CLG Uí Briain Fothaír Ghleann) is a Gaelic Athletic Association club based in Foreglen, County Londonderry, Northern Ireland. The club is a member of the Derry GAA and currently cater for gaelic football. The club is named after Irish nationalist MP and social revolutionary William O'Brien. They are the oldest club within the Derry GAA.

Foreglen have won the Derry Intermediate Football Championship four times and the Derry Junior Football Championship once. Underage teams up to U-12's play in North Derry league and championships, from U-14 upwards teams compete in All-Derry competitions. Foreglen won the Derry Intermediate Football Championship in 2013 after they defeated Glen GAC by 3–09 to 1–11. In November 2013, the club were promoted to the Division 1 of the Derry ACFL after a playoff win against Greenlough GAC. In November 2015 they were relegated, losing to Glenullin GAC in the Division 1 relegation play-off. Foreglen again won the Derry Intermediate Championship beating Claudy, 0-15 - 0-09.

== Gaelic football ==
Foreglen fields Gaelic football teams at U9, U11.5, U13, U15, U17, U19, Reserve and Senior levels. They currently compete in the Derry Intermediate Football Championship (See Above) and Division 2 of the Derry ACFL.

They are the oldest team in County Londonderry since 1888. 1888-2013 125th anniversary

== History ==
O'Brien's first major success came in 1985 when they won the Derry Intermediate Football Championship. They won the competition for a second time in 2004; the final was not played and Foreglen were awarded the title. They then won the competition for a third time in 2012. They then won the competition again in 2019. Foreglen also won the Derry Junior Football Championship in 1990.

Foreglen no longer play 'Down the lane', Over the last few years re-development work has gone on at O'Brien Park. The pitch was officially re-opened in June 2002. Now foreglen has a clubhouse with gym and indoor hall and a stand.

In the early years they also fielded a hurling team

== Camogie ==
Foreglen also used to field Camogie teams at various age-groups.

== Football titles ==
=== Senior ===
- Derry Intermediate Football Championship: 4
  - 1985, 2004, 2013, 2019
- Derry Junior Football Championship: 1
  - 1990
- Dr Kerlin Cup: 5
  - 1958, 1961, 1963, 1965, 2007
- Under 21 All County Football Championship: 1
  - 2009
- Under 21 North Derry Football Championship:
  - 2009

=== Minor ===
- Tommy O'Neill Cup (Derry Minor 'B' Football Championship) 1
  - 2006
- North Derry Minor 'B' Football Championship: 1
  - 2006
- North Derry Minor 'B' Football League: 2
  - 2001, 2006
- Carlin/Duffy Cup: 3
  - 2001, 2007, 2013

== See also ==
- Derry Intermediate Football Championship
- List of Gaelic games clubs in Derry
