= Magilligan GAC =

Derry-based Gaelic games club

St Aidan's GAC Magilligan
- CLG Naomh Aodhán Ard Mhic Giollagain
- Founded: 1969
- County: Derry
- Colours: Red and White
- Coordinates: 55°09′05.20″N 6°54′45.88″W

Playing kits
Standard colours

Saint Aidan's GAC Magilligan (Irish: CLG Naomh Aodhán Ard Mhic Giollagain) is a Gaelic Athletic Association club based in Magilligan, County Londonderry, Northern Ireland. The club is a member of Derry GAA and currently caters for Gaelic football.

Magilligan has won the Derry Junior Football Championship twice. Underage teams up to U-12's play in North Derry GAA league and championships, from U-14 upwards teams compete in All-Derry competitions.

== Gaelic football ==
Magilligan field Gaelic football teams at U8, U10, U12, U14, U16, Minor and Senior levels. They currently compete in the Derry Junior Championship and Division 3 of the Derry ACFL. They most recently won the Junior Championship in 2016 against Drum.

=== Notable players ===
- George McGee - played full-back for Magilligan, Derry and Ulster.
- John Eddie Mullan - former Derry player. While he played most of his club football for Dungiven, he played with Magilligan in 1944.

== History ==
St Aidan's first affiliated in 1938 and the club colours were green and white. In 1944 Magilligan won the North Derry League and Neil Carlin Cup. Magilligan's Anthony J. McGurk in 1945 captained Derry to their first Ulster Championship. In the mid 1960s George Magee was also a regular on the county team. The club won the Dr. Kerlin Cup in 1962.

St Aidan's Magilligan officially reformed in 1969 and wore red and white colours. St Aidan's biggest success came in 1988 when they won the Derry Junior Football Championship. The club has since purchased its own grounds.

== Honours ==
=== Senior ===
- Derry Junior Football Championship: 2
  - 1988 2016
- Dr Kerlin Cup 1
  - 1962*
- Neil Carlin Cup 1
  - 1944*

Note: The above lists may be incomplete. Please add any other honours you know of.
* Before official formation of current club.

== See also ==
- List of Gaelic games clubs in Derry
