= Slaughtmanus GAC =

Derry-based Gaelic games club

St Mary's GAC Slaughtmanus
- CLG Naomh Mhuire Leacht Mhanuis
- Founded: 1978
- County: Derry
- Colours: Red and Green
- Grounds: Pairc an Sean O’Gallcobhair

Saint Mary's GAC Slaughtmanus (Irish: CLG Naomh Mhuire Leacht Mhanuis) is a Gaelic Athletic Association club based in Slaughtmanus on the outskirts of Derry, County Londonderry, Northern Ireland. The club is a member of the Derry GAA and currently caters for Gaelic football and Camogie.

The team serves for the parish of Tamnaherin, drawing players from places such as Lettershendoney, Strathfoyle and Eglinton as well as some players from the Waterside area of Derry. Underage teams up to under-12s play in the North Derry league and championships, while teams from under-14 upwards compete in All-Derry competitions. Slaughtmanus have won the Derry Intermediate Football Championship once.

== History ==
St Mary's GAC Slaughtmanus was founded in 1978 when two local teams, Wolf Tone Slaughtmanus, founded in 1958, and St Mary's Mullabouy, founded in 1976, amalgamated.

On 30 November 1978 Slaughtmanus secretary Edmund Brewster received a letter from the secretary of St Mary's GAC Mullabouy requesting the possibility of the two clubs amalgamating. The two clubs decided to have a public meeting on 20 December 1978. The meeting was chaired by An tAth. Seán Ó Gallchobhair (the curate in Tamnaherin end of the Parish at the time). After much discussion the two clubs decided that the best thing for the future of the GAA in the area was to amalgamate. The new club was to be called St Mary's GAC Slaughtmanus. The club colours were to be Red and Black. These colours had no significance to either club.

The newly formed committee approached The Doire County Board to ask if the senior and reserve teams could play in The All County Division 2 as Drumsurn did not want to be promoted that year to 1st Division. The County Board agreed and St Mary's GAC Slaughtmanus played its first match against Glenullin in March 1979.

In 2000 it was decided to change the club colours to green and red, green representing the old Slaughtmanus and red representing Mullabouy.

Playing numbers have increased since Strathfoyle team Enagh became defunct. The club had a new pitch installed and pending a lottery grant plan further developments such as a training pitch and a new hall.

== Honours ==
=== Senior ===
- Derry Intermediate Football Championship: 1
  - 1988
- Derry Junior Football Championship: 3
  - 1976 (As Mullaghbuoy)
  - 1978 (As Mullaghbuoy)
  - 2025
- Derry Junior Football League: 1
  - 2019

=== Reserve ===
- Derry Intermediate Reserve Football Championship: 2
  - 1991
  - 2022
- Derry Junior Reserve Football Championship: 1
  - 2025

=== Under-21 ===
- Harry O' Kane Football Championship: 1
  - 2007

=== Minor ===
- Tommy O'Neill Cup (All County Minor 'B' Football Championship): 1
  - 2004
- North Derry Minor 'A' Football Championship: 2
  - 2003, 2004
- North Derry Minor 'A' Football League: 1
  - 2005

== See also ==
- Derry Intermediate Football Championship
- List of Gaelic games clubs in Derry
