= Desertmartin GAC =

Derry-based Gaelic games club

St Martin's GAC Desertmartin
- CLG Naomh Mhartain Diseart Mhartain
- Founded: 1933
- County: Derry
- Nickname: Yellas, The Martins
- Colours: Yellow and green
- Grounds: Longfield (Fada Faiche); Hollow Park (Páirc an Cuas)
- Coordinates: 54°46′00.86″N 6°42′02.21″W

Playing kits
Home Kit	2nd Kit

Senior Club Championships
	All Ireland	Ulster champions	Derry champions
Football:	-	1	1

Saint Martin's GAC Desertmartin (Irish: CLG Naomh Mhartain Diseart Mhartain) is a Gaelic Athletic Association club based in Desertmartin, County Londonderry, Northern Ireland. The club is a member of Derry GAA and currently caters for Gaelic football and Ladies' Gaelic football.

The club has won the Derry Senior Football Championship once in its history and appeared in four finals. Underage teams up to U-12s play in South Derry league and championships, the U-14 team and upwards compete in All-Derry competitions.

== History ==
There is a history of the Gaelic Athletic Association in Desertmartin stretching back to June 1885, where Gaelic games were played in the townland of Tirgan. In 1933, Master McLaughlin, a teacher from Derry City proposed a club be founded. It was decided the club's name should be St. Martins and the club played in yellow with a green shamrock. One of the club's first successes came in 1945 when they won the Derry Football League.

It was in 1938 that Camogie began in Desertmartin, with the formation of three teams; St. Bridget's, Brackagh and Tirgan. These teams amalgamated into St. Mary's in 1959, which went on to win the South Derry League in 1961. However camogie went out of existence in the late 1960s before re-forming in 1977, and again going out of existence in the early 1980s.

The 1950s were a successful period for the club. Among honours they won was the 1950 Derry Junior Football Championship, beating Kilrea in the South Derry final before beating Coleraine in the All-Derry decider. They went on to win the Ulster title that year. The club's greatest honour came three years later when it won the 1953 Derry Senior Football Championship, beating Ballerin in the final. St Martin's reached the final again in 1959, but lost out to Bellaghy.

In 1960, the club purchased their current playing field in the townland of Longfield. After falling from the Senior ranks, Desertmartin won the Derry Junior Championship for a second time in 1968. The club entered Scór for the first time in 1971 and have had some successes.

The then GAA President Paddy Buggy opened the club's new "Gaelic Centre" in 1984, the GAA's centenary year. The 1990s saw more development around the new Gaelic Centre in Longfield with the opening of a new re-furbished pitch and the opening of the John O'Hagan memorial stand.

On the field, the senior team had an up and down spell, during which time them won the Division 2 league on 3 occasions, and adding 4 Intermediate Reserve Championships during this time. 1993 also seen the Minor team lift the South Derry Minor Championship, beating Newbridge in the final. In 2002, Desertmartin lifted both the South Derry 'B' and All-Derry B Minor Championships. They also won the South Derry 'B' championship in 2004 and the Derry League in 2007.

== Gaelic football ==
Desertmartin fields Gaelic football teams at U8, U10, U12, U14, U16, Minor, U21, Reserve and Senior levels. The Senior team competes in the Derry Intermediate Football Championship and Division 2 of the Derry ACFL.

== Ladies' Gaelic football ==
The club also has a number of Ladies' Gaelic football groups which range from under 12's to Seniors. The Seniors reached the Derry Junior Final 2008.

== Honours ==
=== Senior ===
- Derry Senior Football Championship: 1
  - 1953, Runner-up 1951, 1952, 1959
- Derry Intermediate Football Championship: 1
  - 2026, Runner-up 1977, 1985, 1991, 1994, 2003
- Derry Junior Football Championship: 4
  - 1950, 1968, 2020, 2021
- South Derry Junior Football Championship: 2
  - 1950, 1968

=== Under-21 ===
- South Derry Under-21 Football Championship: 1
  - 2009

=== Minor ===
- Derry Minor B2 Football Championship 1
  - 2015
- Derry Minor Football League: 4
  - 1945, 1946, 1956, 1981
- Tommy O'Neill Cup (Derry Minor 'B' Football Championship) 1
  - 2002
- Derry Minor 'B' Football League: 1
  - 2007
- South Derry Minor 'B' Football Championship: 3
  - 1993, 2002, 2004

== See also ==
- Derry Intermediate Football Championship
- List of Gaelic games clubs in Derry
