= Steelstown GAC =

Derry-based Gaelic games club

Steelstown Brian Óg's GAC
- CLG Bhriain Óig Baile Stíl
- Founded: 1987
- County: Derry
- Colours: Blue and Gold
- Grounds: Páirc Bríd
- Coordinates: 55°01′59.08″N 7°18′37.70″W

Playing kits
Standard colours

Senior Club Championships
	All Ireland	Ulster champions	Derry champions
Football:	0	0	0
Ladies' football:	0	0	5

Steelstown Brian Óg's GAC (Irish: CLG Bhriain Óig Baile Stíl) is a Gaelic Athletic Association club based in Derry, Northern Ireland. The club is a member of the Derry GAA and currently cater for Gaelic football and Ladies' Gaelic football.

The club's catchment area includes Steelstown and the wider Shantallow area at the edge of the city. Steelstown are one of the most successful Gaelic teams in the Cityside of Derry, with most of the county's footballers coming from rural areas. Underage teams up to U-12's play in North Derry GAA league and championships; from U-14 upwards teams compete in All-Derry competitions. The club play their home games at Páirc Bríd.

== History ==
Established in 1987, Steelstown GAC is one of the youngest clubs in the county. The founding members were mostly people from rural areas of the county who had moved to the city. They included twice All Star Anthony McGurk from Lavey, his wife Mary, Philip and Marion Devlin from Drumsurn and Mickey Doherty from Claudy. The first team was an U-12 team called Steelstown/Pennyburn. They had this name because they drew players from both of the schools, and played at Templemore Sports Complex. The club gained access to the North Derry Board in 1996 and a Senior team was formed for the first time. With an increase in popularity of Gaelic games in Derry City, the club gained more members since the mid-1990s.

In recent years, a number of Steelstown players have represented Derry at Senior, U21 and Minor level. Paul O'Hea and Marty Dunne were part of Derry's 2002 All-Ireland Minor Football Championship winning side, and in 2007, O'Hea became the first Steelstown player to play for Derry in the All-Ireland Championship when he came on as a sub against Mayo in Celtic Park. 15 Steelstown players were part of the St Columb's team that won the McLarnon Cup in 2002. Stephen Cleary, Neil Forrester, Mickey McKinney from the club were part of Derry's 2007 All-Ireland Minor Championship runners-up team. Martin Dunne was part of Damien Cassidy's 2010 intercounty squad and made multiple appearances in the NFL.

In 2003, the club's new home pitch was opened on the Ballyarnet Road. A new £600,000 development of club rooms and changing facilities was completed at Páirc Brid, and was opened in March 2007. Pairc Brid is the home of Steelstown Brian Óg's GAC. It is named after former chairperson, Brid Kelly-McElroy, who taught in Pennburn Primary school, and who was influential in the formative years of Steelstown in the 1990s. Opened in 2003, Pairc Bhird is a "Prunty Pitch", with clubhouse facilities including 4 changing rooms, a meeting room and a sports hall. by then GAA president, Sean Kelly.

In 2005, Steelstown lost to Glen Thirds in the final of the Derry Junior Football Championship. The Seniors achieved promotion to Intermediate Football. Around this time, the club also started a ladies' team. In 2008, Steelstown claimed their first ever senior title by winning against Limavady in the Dr Kerlin Cup final.

In 2010, Steelstown were runners up to Castledawson in the Intermediate Championship final, losing out by a late point on the scoreline of 0–10 to 0–11.

Having finished top of Division 2, Steelstown lost to Craigbane in the 2011 league final by 3 points. With one final chance against Division 1 relegation candidates, Newbridge, Steelstown booked their place in Derry's top flight as the first city side to do so in over 30 years. An injury time goal was the eventual margin as Brian Óg's secured senior status for the first time.

As of May 2026, Luke Harkin, widely considered one of the footballers of all time, plays for the club.

== Gaelic football ==
Steelstown fields Gaelic football teams at U8, U10, U12, U14, U16, Minor, Reserve, and Senior levels. They compete in the Derry Senior Championship and Division 1 of the Derry ACFL having won promotion for the first time in their short history in 2011.

== Ladies' Gaelic football ==
The Ladies teams at the club were founded in June 2002. Since then, a number of coaches have been involved in the development of the LGFA within the club.

Steelstown field has Ladies' football teams from U8 through Senior. The senior ladies won county Junior B title in 2012. The minor ladies won their county championship in 2012.

As of November 2023, the Senior Ladies were the 2023 Derry Senior League Winners, 2023 Derry Senior Champions for the 4th year in a row, and 2023 Ulster Intermediate Champions. Caoimhe O'Kane was awarded Player of the Match in the Ulster final.

== Honours ==
=== Senior ===
- All-Ireland Intermediate Club Football Championship: 1
  - 2021–22
- Ulster Intermediate Club Football Championship: 1
  - 2021
- Derry Intermediate Football Championship: 1
  - 2021
- Dr Kerlin Cup (North Derry 13-a-Side) 1
  - 2008

=== Senior Reserves ===
- Intermediate Football Championship Winners 3
  - 2016, 2018, 2020
- Intermediate Football League 1
  - 2011

=== Ladies ===
- Derry Senior Football Championship 5
  - 2017, 2020, 2021, 2022, 2023
- Ulster Ladies Intermediate Football Championship 1
  - 2023
- Derry Intermediate Football Championship 1
  - 2016
- Ulster Junior Championship 1
  - 2016
- Junior B Championship 1
  - 2012
- Minor County championship 1
  - 2012
- Minor League title 1
  - 2012
- Under 16 county shield 1
  - 2011

=== Minor ===
- Tommy O'Neill Cup (Derry Minor 'A' Football Championship) 1
  - 2005
- North Derry Minor 'A' Football Championship: 1
  - 2005

== See also ==
- Derry Intermediate Football Championship
- List of Gaelic games clubs in Derry
