= Greenlough GAC =

Derry-based Gaelic games club

St Oliver Plunkett's GAC Greenlough
- CLG Naomh Oilibheir Pluinceid Grian Locha
- Founded: 1939
- County: Derry
- Nickname: The Lough
- Colours: Red, White and Black
- Grounds: Saint Oliver Plunkett Park
- Coordinates: 54°52′03.23″N 6°30′46.97″W

Playing kits
Football

Saint Oliver Plunkett's GAC Greenlough (Irish: CLG Naomh Oilibheir Pluinceid Grainlocha) is a Gaelic Athletic Association club based in Clady/Greenlough, County Londonderry, Northern Ireland. The club is a member of Derry GAA and currently caters for Gaelic football and camogie, and also competes in Scór. The club is named after Irish martyr Saint Oliver Plunkett.

Greenlough has won the Derry Intermediate Football Championship three times and the Derry Junior Football Championship three times.

== Gaelic football ==
Greenlough fields Gaelic football teams at U8, U10, U12, U14, U16, Minor, Reserve and Senior levels. They currently compete in the Derry Senior Championship and Division 1 of the Derry ACFL. Their current manager is Niall Conway.

== Camogie ==
Greenlough also fields camogie teams at various age-groups. The camogie teams compete as St Columba's Camogie Club, although they use the Greenlough grounds.

== History ==
St Oliver Plunkett's GAC Greenlough was founded in 1939 by Michael Henry, Patrick Rankin and Louis Madden. Despite a lack of silverware during the period, the 1940s saw arguably the greatest ever Greenlough team. Players such as Thomas Edward McCloskey, Jimmy Cassidy and the McErlean brothers (Eoin and Henry) played on the Derry Senior side of the time. Jimmy Cassidy in November 2007 was voted as the right-corner forward for the All Time Star Derry team. The club's first major success at Senior level came in 1953 when they won the Derry Junior Football Championship and added a second Junior Championship in 1965. In Scór Greenlough has won two All Ireland titles; in Senior Céilí dancing and in Junior Ballad groups.

The club won the Derry Intermediate Football Championship for the first time in 1976. The new park and pavilion were opened in the GAA's centenary year (1984) and are dedicated to Saint Oliver Plunkett. The Derry Senior Football Championship final that year between Dungiven and Castledawson was held at the venue. Two years later, Greenlough won the Derry Junior Championship for a third time.

On Easter Sunday 2002 Greenlough reopened their pavilion which was damaged in an arson attack two years previously. The opening took place after the final of the Ulster U-21 Football Championship final which was hosted by Greenlough. The club won the 2005 Derry Senior Football League Second division and hence were promoted to the First Division and the Derry Senior Championship, however the club were relegated in the following season.

In May 2014, the club celebrated its 75th anniversary with a gala dinner and other commemorative events.

== Football titles ==
=== Senior ===
- Derry Intermediate Football Championship: 3
  - 1976, 2008, 2015
- Derry Intermediate Football League: 1
  - 2005, 2015
- Derry Junior Football Championship: 3
  - 1953, 1965, 1986

=== Minor ===
- Tommy O'Neill Cup (Derry Minor 'B' Football Championship) 1
  - 1999
- South Derry Minor 'B' Football Championship: 4
  - 1994, 1998, 1999, 2005
- South Derry Minor 'B' Football League: 1
  - 2005

== See also ==
- Derry Intermediate Football Championship
- List of Gaelic games clubs in Derry
