= John Mitchel's GAC Glenullin =

Derry-based Gaelic games club

- CLG Seán Mistéil Gleann an Iolair
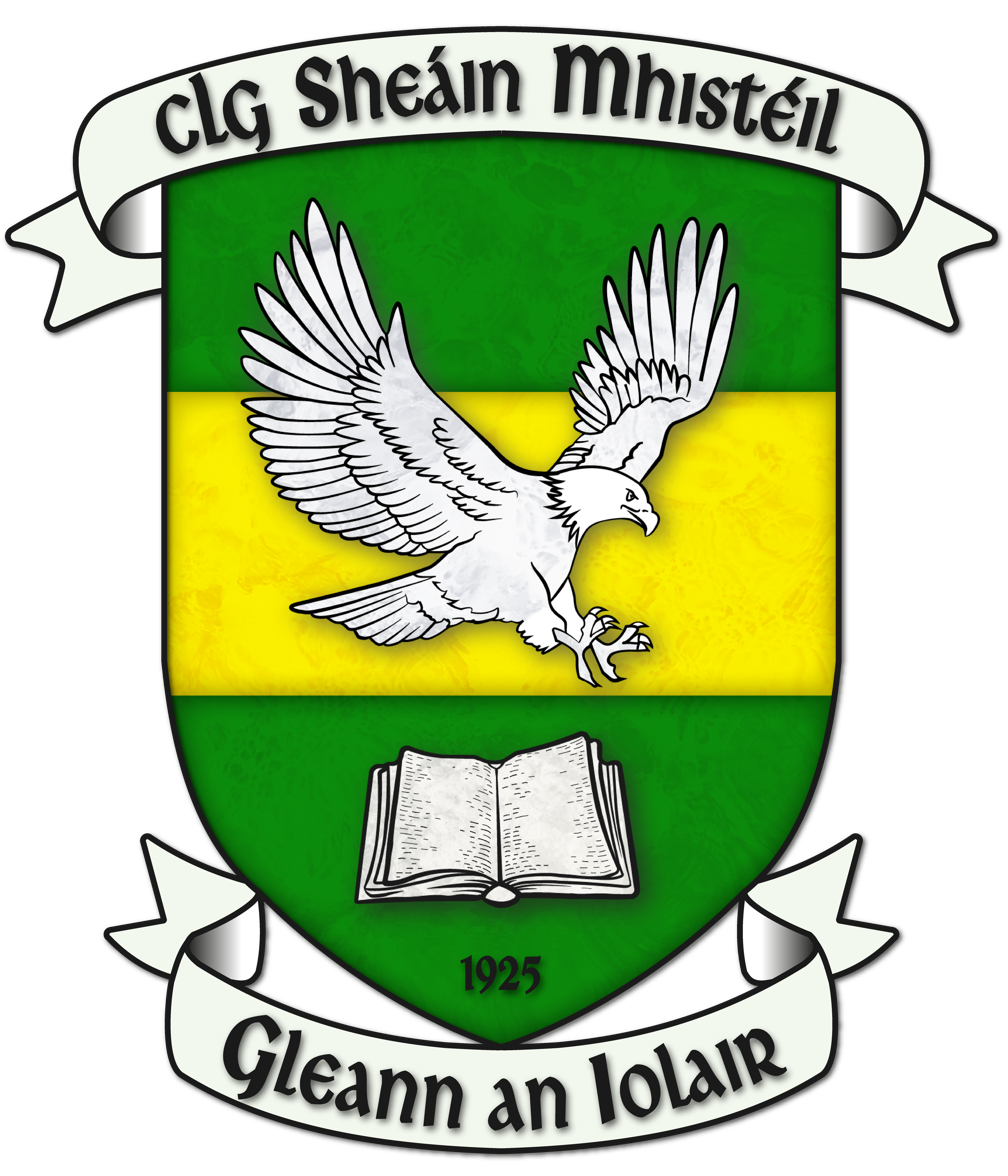
- Founded: 1925
- County: Derry
- Nickname: The Glen
- Colours: Green and gold
- Grounds: Páirc Seán Ó Maolain
- Coordinates: 54°57′13.20″N 6°44′04.89″W

Playing kits
Standard colours

Senior Club Championships
| | All Ireland | Ulster champions | Derry champions |
|---|---|---|---|
| Football: | - | - | 3 |

John Mitchel's GAC Glenullin (Irish: CLG Seán Mistéil Gleann an Iolair) is a Gaelic Athletic Association club based in Glenullin, County Londonderry, Northern Ireland. The club is a member of the Derry GAA. They currently cater for Gaelic football, camogie and Ladies Gaelic football.

Glenullin fields Gaelic football teams at U8, U10, U12, U14, U16, Minor, Reserve and Senior levels. Underage teams up to U-12s play in North Derry league and championships, from U14 upwards teams compete in All-Derry competitions.

== History ==
In May 1925 Johnny Mullan (Seán Ó Maoláin), the local school teacher, called a meeting with the aim of establishing a new Gaelic football club in Glenullin. The club decided to name itself after Irish rebel John Mitchel and wore green and white hooped jerseys. The first ever match took place that summer against a team from Randalstown, County Antrim. The team colours have now changed to green and gold hoops.

Glenullin's original football pitch was Tinker's Park in Coolcoscreghan townland, at the junction of the Lisnascreghog and Glen roads. This field is now livestock grazing. Their original meeting hall is a green metal building with a red roof on the Glenullin Road at the junction with Lisnascreghog Road. Sadly, this piece of their history has been abandoned and allowed to fall into disrepair. Their current pitch beside the housing estate in Curraghmore was opened in 1973.

Glenullin at the time played in South Derry competitions. They were soon successful and won the 1927 Derry Senior Football League and the 1928 Derry Senior Football Championship. They were also victorious in the 1934 South Derry League. A branch of the Gaelic League was also formed in Glenullin around this time.

== Well known players ==
- Dermot McNicholl – All Star winner and member of Derry's 1993 All-Ireland winning team as well as captain of the 1983 All-Ireland minor football winning team. He played in three All-Ireland minor finals, the first when he was only 14. He won three Sigerson and two Ryan cup medals with UUJ. He had a spell in Australia playing Australian Rules football with St Kilda. He represented Ireland in the Compromise Rules series' on many occasions, often as one of the most influential players. He was also captain of the Glenullin team which won the Derry Championship in 1985 and won an Ulster Championship with Derry in 1987 and 1993.
- Paddy Bradley – 2007 All Star.
- John Eddie Mullan – Former Derry player. While he played most of his club football for Dungiven, he played with Glenullin for a year in 1943.

== Football Titles ==
=== Senior ===
- Ulster Senior Club Football League: 3
  - 2007, 2014, 2016
- Ulster Intermediate Football Championship:
  - 2025
- Derry Senior Football Championship: 3
  - 1928, 1985, 2007
- Derry Senior Football League: 2
  - 1927, 2008
- Derry Intermediate Football Championship: 4
  - 1977, 2022, 2023, 2025
- James O'Hagan Cup
  - 1993, 1995, 2005, 2006, 2007, 2016
- Dr. Kerlin Cup 7
  - 1938, 1939, 1942, 1945, 1964, 2005, 2026

=== Minor ===
- Derry Minor Football Championship: 3
  - 1962, 1981, 1982
- Tommy O'Neill Cup 1
  - 1998, 2001
- Derry Minor 'B' Football Championship: 1
  - 2018
- Derry Minor 'C' Football Championship: 1
  - 2015
- North Derry Minor 'B' Football Championship: 2
  - 1989, 2001
- North Derry Minor Football League: 1
  - 1986
- North Derry Minor 'B' Football League: 2
  - 1989, 1993

== See also ==
- Derry Senior Club Football Championship
- List of Gaelic games clubs in Derry
