= Dungiven GAC =

Derry-based Gaelic games club

St Canice's GAC Dungiven
- Cumann Chainnigh Naofa Dún Geimhin
- Founded: 1943
- County: Derry
- Nickname: The Magpies
- Colours: Black and white
- Grounds: Páirc Uí Cáithaín
- Coordinates: 54°55′32.87″N 6°55′06.88″W

Playing kits
Standard colours

Senior Club Championships
	All Ireland	Ulster champions	Derry champions
Football:	-	1	7

St Canice's GAC Dungiven (Irish: Cumann Chainnigh Naofa Dún Geimhin) is a Gaelic Athletic Association club based in Dungiven, County Londonderry, Northern Ireland. It is part of Derry GAA. It currently caters for Gaelic football and Ladies' Gaelic football. The hurling club in the town is Kevin Lynch's.

The club's biggest success was when they won the 1997 Ulster Senior Club Football Championship. They have also won the Derry Senior Football Championship on seven occasions, and the Derry GAA Senior Hurling Championship nine times.

Dungiven GAC was a combined football and hurling club until 1981. Following the death of Kevin Lynch (an Irish National Liberation Army volunteer from Dungiven) on hunger strike the hurling team changed its name as a mark of respect and became a separate club.

== History ==
The club is named after Saint Canice, who was born in 516AD in Cianachta Glenn Geimin, which is now the barony of Keenaght, which includes Dungiven. Although the club, St Canice's, was founded in 1943 there is firm evidence that Gaelic games were played in Dungiven over a century before that. The first record of Gaelic football played by a Dungiven team was a match on 9 April 1922 against Creggan (from Faughanvale Parish). The Dungiven team of that time played under the name of John Mitchel's GFC and they clinched the North Derry League that year.

=== 1930s ===
After a few years there was a dormant period, but during the mid-1930s there was a resurgence of local interest in Gaelic football. The local curate, Father Colm McGoldrick, who in 1936 was made chairman of the refounded North Derry Board, encouraged the Dungiven players to regroup. Consequently, a meeting was called in May 1936, in McKenna's store (Groogans Lower Main Street) to set up a club. A committee was elected: chairman – Fr McGoldrick, secretary – Gerry McCloskey and treasurer – P. Conway.

Bob Hasson kindly donated £5.00 cash to buy jerseys. A set of green and gold quarters jerseys were bought. Matches were played on a field belonging to Joe O'Neill which was situated on the Garvagh Road about one mile from the town. In 1936 two major games were played in this field, a County Final between Loup and Park and a County match between Derry and Fermanagh. St Canice's Hall was used for social events of the club, ceilidhs etc.

On 27 May 1937 St Canice's defeated O'Connor's Limavady, at Claudy Green to win the Kerlin Cup. Dungiven 3–3, Limavady 1–8, the winning point was scored by the captain Frank McCloskey from a '50'. The club acquired Farrens field to play matches, i.e. where Mitchel Park is now situated. This pitch was more convenient to the town.

Father McGoldrick was transferred to Ballinascreen in 1938 and Gerry McCloskey took over as Club chairman, a position he also held in 1939. In 1939 Dungiven won the North Derry Championship, beating Limavady at Drumsurn 1–04 to 0–02. On this occasion Leo Leonard in goals was the star of the game, pulling off several spectacular saves. Dungiven had reached their first ever County Final, the opposition being provided by Magherafelt. Ballinascreen won by 3–07 to 1–02.

In September 1939, with war and the subsequent upheaval worldwide, football locally was forced to take a back seat. Many goods became rationed, petrol in particular became very scarce. Added to this, there was a large presence of troops stationed in and around Dungiven. The local upheaval resulted in tremendous pressure on the club, and in 1939 they were forced to fold.

=== 1940s ===
However, the period of inactivity was short-lived; in late 1943 a small group of young enthusiasts set about revitalising the club. A meeting was held in the primary school and Master Aiden Hegarty was elected as chairman, secretary – Charlie Hasson and treasurer – Robbie Hasson. Dan McCloskey provided a set of jerseys – black and white vertical stripes. George McCloskey was the manager. A few friendlies were played.

St Canice's GAC re-affiliated to the North Derry League in 1944. In 1945 they won the North Derry Championship beating Magilligan. However they were beaten in the County Final by Newbridge.

In 1947 St Canice's won their first Derry Senior Football Championship. After beating Drum in the North Derry Final, by a score line 0–03 to no score, they went on to beat Lavey 2–08 to 2–03 on 15 September 1947 in the County Final.

In 1948 they won the North Derry Championship again by beating Limavady 3–08 to 0–04. In the County Final they lost to Newbridge 1–06 to 0–07.

In 1949 for the fourth time in five years Dungiven won the North Derry Championship, beating Faughanvale by 1–10 to 1–04 at Banagher. However they were beaten by the South Derry Champions Magherafelt in the County Championship Semi-final by 4–08 to 1–04.

=== 1950s ===
In 1950 Joe Beatty was elected chairman; this was to be the first of a record breaking 21 consecutive years in the chair. Joe came to Dungiven in 1928 and hailed from County Fermanagh.

1951 was a memorable year for the St Canice's Club which won its second County Senior Championship at the expense of Bellaghy 1–09 to 4–03. The same year it won the North Derry League and Championship and also won the Dr Kerlin and Neal Carlin Cups.

In 1952 Dungiven were again crowned North Derry Champions after they defeated Magilligan in the Final, but lost the County Semi-final to Desertmartin 2–05 to 0–03. The club was not to contest a County Final for the remainder of the decade, but remained strong in North Derry football.

On 1 August 1953 negotiations commenced and a price of £800 was agreed with Harry Deeny to buy the field (Pat Kane's) which is the present O'Cahan's Park. The pitch was opened on Sunday 29 June 1957.

1955 and 1956 were years perhaps more memorable for Minor football. The Minor team won the North Derry Championships in both seasons. They lost the County Minor Semi-final in 1955 to an excellent Bellaghy team and won the 1956 Final at the expense of Kilrea/Swatragh 0–04 to 2–05.

=== 1960s ===
In the 1960 County Final Dungiven led by 2–01 to 0–02 at half time and had Bellaghy reeling but finished up losing 2–01 to 1–05.

In 1963 after a disagreement with the North Derry board, the club withdrew from all North Derry Competitions. The Senior team still played in the Championship. Underage football suffered and many players went to play with neighbouring clubs. This brought to an end the great run of underage success.

In 1965 Dungiven came back to North Derry football at underage level but the Senior team continued to play in South Derry competitions. At County level Derry Minor Team created a piece of history by winning an All Ireland for the first time ever. Anthony Burke from St Canice's was a member of this team.

In 1966 Dungiven reached the County Minor Final after defeating Ballerin in the North Derry Final, only to be disqualified on a technicality. The Seniors played Newbridge in the County Final but were beat 2–10 to 0–03.

In 1967 Dungiven was relegated; however the following year they won promotion again. The arrival of John Somers as a top class goal-keeper was to prove very significant. He was later chosen at county, interprovincial and All-Star level.

=== 1970s ===
Although never reaching the ultimate goal of winning the County Championship in the 1970s, St Canice's reached the final in 1976. The club had not fared well earlier in the decade, reduced to taking part in the Intermediate Championship in 1972. However, in the 1972 and 1973 seasons St Canice's were undefeated in their League games.

In 1976 Ballerin beat St Canice's in the County Championship at Magherafelt 0–9 to 0–3.

Underage level in St Canice's had many successes in the late '70s in 1977 they won two county titles, one at Under 14 which was against a highly fancied Ballinderry at Swatragh, and the other at Under 16 level against Newbridge.

In 1978 Dungiven reached the Under 16 Final for the second successive year, playing Magherafelt at Swatragh. St Canice's won 1–05 to 0–04. The Reserves won their first title in that year, defeating Ballinderry by a single point.

In 1979 Dungiven won their third Under 16 Championship title in a row by beating Ballinderry 5–05 to 2–01, and bridged a 23-year gap by beating Bellaghy 1–06 to 0–07 to win the Minor Championship.

=== 1980s ===
In 1980 Dungiven Seniors drew with Lavey in the Semi-final of the Championship. However, in the replay at Ballinascreen, Lavey won by seven points 1–11 to 1–04. The Minors won the County Championship by defeating Magherafelt 1–7 to 0–5 at Newbridge. The Reserve team won the County Championship both in 1980 and in 1981. Lavey beat St Canice's in the 1981 Senior Championship this time in the preliminary round.

In 1982 Dungiven Seniors played in the County Championship Final against Ballinderry, it ended in a draw 1–07 to 1–07. The replay probably remembered best for the extremely physical nature of play ended with both teams level 3 points a piece. Extra time was played and Ballinderry won on a score line off 0–7 to 0–5. The aftermath to the 1982 County Final was to be costly to both Clubs. The Derry County Board decided that both clubs must be disciplined for 'gross misconduct on the field' and the punishment meted out to Dungiven was a six-month suspension. This measure was to have harsh repercussions as it meant that St Canice's were unable to complete their league programme, and this resulted in the Senior team being relegated from the Premier League. Ballinderry were stripped of the Championship, but were reinstated as champions in 2006. Two Underage County Titles came to Dungiven in 1982. The Under 14s beat Glen convincingly 3–06 to 1–01 in the Final. At Under 16 level Dungiven beat a highly fancied Lavey team at Swatragh by 2–3 to 0–4.

However, in 1983 St Canice's Seniors bounced back. The battle for league honours developed into a three-horse race between Glenullin, Ballinderry and Dungiven and it was obvious from the early stages that every point was vital. Indeed, so keen was the competition that the placings were not decided until the very last game when Dungiven defeated Glenullin to clinch the title. In the Championship semi-final Dungiven left it very late to snatch the equaliser as the teams drew Dungiven 1–07, Bellaghy 0–10. In the replay at Swatragh, Dungiven outplayed the Blues in all departments to win by a three-point margin, 0–08 to 0–05. St Canice's were back in their second successive County Final, this time facing the Rossas, Magherafelt at Ballinscreen and in an amazing Final snatched the title from Magherafelt's grasp in the dying minutes of the game. At last a 32-year gap had been bridged and Dungiven had won their third Senior Championship. In 1983 St Canice's also won the reserve Championship defeating Ballinderry by 2–08 to 0–08 at Ballinscreen – a unique double. This was the Reserves' fourth success in six years. The Under 16s played Ballinderry at Ballinscreen in the County Final, winning by 3–04 to 3–03.

In 1984 St Canice's won their fourth Senior Championship. In the Centenary County Final St Canice's defeated Castledawson at Greenlough.

== Football titles ==
=== Senior ===
- Ulster Senior Club Football Championship: 1
  - 1997
- Derry Senior Football Championship: 7
  - 1947, 1951, 1983, 1984, 1987, 1991, 1997
- Derry Senior Football League: 5
  - 1976, 1983, 1990, 1991, 2003
- North Derry Senior Football Championship: 8
  - 1939, 1945, 1947, 1948, 1949, 1950, 1951, 1952
- Derry Junior Football Championship: 2
  - 1987 (won by Dungiven Thirds team), 1992 (won by Dungiven Thirds team)
- Dr Kerlin Cup 27
  - 1937, 1944, 1946, 1949, 1950 (shared), 1951, 1953, 1954, 1956, 1959, 1977, 1982, 1983, 1988, 1989, 1991, 1992, 1993, 1999, 2000, 2001, 2002, 2003, 2004, 2010, 2011, 2012
- Neil Carlin Cup 1
  - 1951, 2002 (won by Dungiven Thirds)

=== Reserves ===
- Derry Reserve Football Championship: 9
  - 1978, 1979, 1980, 1983, 1985, 1986, 1990, 1992, 2015

=== Under 21 ===
- Derry Under 21 Football Championship: 2
  - 2011, 2019

=== Minor ===
- Ulster Minor Club Football Championship: 2
  - 1990, 2023
- Derry Minor Football Championship: 10
  - 1956, 1979, 1980, 1985, 1986, 1990, 2006, 2009, 2022, 2025
- Carlin/Duffy Cup 5
  - 2000, 2003, 2006, 2009, 2011, 2014, 2015, 2016

== Notable players ==
- Liam Og Hinphey – Current Derry hurler
- Kieran McKeever – Member of Derry's 1993 All-Ireland winning team. Won an All Star in 2000.
- Brian McGilligan – Member of Derry's 1993 All-Ireland winning team. Won All Stars in 1987 and 1993.
- Joe Brolly – Member of Derry's 1993 All-Ireland winning team. Won All Stars in 1996 and 1997.
- Geoffrey McGonagle – Former Derry dual player.
- John Eddie Mullan – Former Derry player.

== See also ==
- Derry Senior Football Championship
- List of Gaelic games clubs in Derry
