= 1993 All-Ireland Senior Football Championship =

Football championship

Championship details
- Dates: 16 May 1993 – 19 September 1993
- Teams: 32

All-Ireland Champions
- Winning team: Derry (1st win)
- Captain: Henry Downey
- Manager: Éamonn Coleman

All-Ireland Finalists
- Losing team: Cork
- Captain: Mick McCarthy
- Manager: Billy Morgan

Provincial Champions
- Munster: Cork
- Leinster: Dublin
- Ulster: Derry
- Connacht: Mayo

Championship statistics
- No. matches played: 35
- Top Scorer: Colin Corkery (3–26)
- Player of the Year: Henry Downey

The 1993 All-Ireland Senior Football Championship was the 107th staging of the All-Ireland Senior Football Championship, the Gaelic Athletic Association's premier inter-county Gaelic football tournament. The championship began on 16 May 1993 and ended on 19 September 1993.

Donegal entered the championship as the defending champions; however, they were defeated by Derry in the Ulster final played during a deluge in Clones.

Derry went on to win the Sam Maguire Cup for the first time, beating Dublin in the All-Ireland semi-final and then Cork in the All-Ireland final by 1–14 to 2–8. Seamas Downey scored Derry's only goal, with his Lavey club mate, John McGurk, being named RTÉ man of the match.

== Provincial championships ==
=== Munster Senior Football Championship ===
Quarter-finals

16 May 1993 Quarter-final	Tipperary	3–18 – 3–8	Limerick	Semple Stadium, Thurles
	P Lambert 0–9, B Burke 2–1, D Hogan 1–0, A Crosse 0–3, P Maguire 0–3, D Foley 0–1, J Costelloe 0–1.		N O'Donnell 3–2, T Cummins 0–2, P Murray 0–2, D Fitzgerald 0–1, J Quane 0–1.	Referee: T Sugrue (Kerry)

30 May 1993 Quarter-final	Clare	1–10 – 2–14	Cork	Cusack Park, Ennis
	M Daly 1–2, A O'Keeffe 0–3, G Killeen 0–3, T Morrissey 0–1, J Enright 0–1.		C Corkery 2–5, J Kavanagah 0–3, T McCarthy 0–2, J Cleary 0–2, C O'Sullivan 0–1, M McCarthy 0–1.	Referee: P Russell (Tipperary)

Semi-finals

20 June 1993 Semi-final	Kerry	0–10 – 1–10	Cork	Fitzgerald Stadium, Killarney
	M Fitzgerald 0–7, E Breen 0–1, K O'Dwyer 0–1, D Hannifin 0–1.		C Corkery 0–6, J Kavanagh 1–2, L Tompkins 0–1, J Cleary 0–1.	Attendance: 42,874; Referee: B White (Wexford)

20 June 1993 Semi-final	Waterford	0–13 – 3–10	Tipperary	Walsh Park, Waterford
	L Dalton 0–4, J Maher 0–4, G Walsh 0–1, M O'Brien 0–1, P Quaelly 0–1, E O'Brien 0–1, P Ferncombe 0–1.		P lambert 2–4, M Sheehan 1–1, D Foley 0–3, A Crosse 0–2.	Attendance: 3,080; Referee: L O'Mahony (Limerick)

Final

18 July 1993 Final	Tipperary	1–8 – 1–16	Cork	Semple Stadium, Thurles
	P Lambert 0–4, D Hogan 1–0, M Sheehan 0–1, P Maguire 0–1, K Coonan 0–1, J Owens 0–1.		C Corkery 0–9, M McCarthy 1–2, J O'Driscoll 0–3, B Coffey 0–1, C O'Sullivan 0–1.	Attendance: 22,140; Referee: T Sugrue (Kerry)

=== Leinster Senior Football Championship ===
Preliminary round

16 May 1993 Preliminary round	Longford	0–10 – 0–22	Offaly	Pearse Park, Longford
	B O'Connor 0–4, P Farrell 0–2, R Culhane 0–2, D Barry 0–1.		P Brady 0–8, K Guing 0–4, T Coffey 0–3, P Moran 0–3, V Claffey 0–2, V Byrne 0–1, C Ryan 0–1.	Attendance: 11000; Referee: T Howard (Kildare)

23 May 1993 Preliminary round	Wexford	0–7 – 0–11	Dublin	Wexford Park, Wexford
	B Dodd 0–3, S Doran 0–3, N Guinan 0–1.		P Clarke 0–4, D Farrell 0–2, N Guiden 0–2, V Murphy 0–2, J Sheedy 0–1.	Referee: P Russell (Tipperary)

23 May 1993 Preliminary round	Laois	3–10 – 1–13	Louth	O'Moore Park, Portlaoise
	M Turley 1–7, M Lalor 1–1, L Turley 1–1, C Maher 0–1.		C Kelly 0–7, C O'Hanlon 1–0, K Reilly 0–1, B Kerins 0–1, D McDonnell 0–1, P Butterly 0–1, E Judge 0–1, D Reilly 0–1.	Referee: P Power (Dublin)

Quarter-finals

6 June 1993 Quarter-final	Kildare	2–13 – 2–11	Wicklow	Croke Park, Dublin
	M Lynch 2–0, N Buckley 0–6, P McLoughlin 0–3, J McDonald 0–2, D Doyle 0–1, A Rainbow 0–1.		C Daye 1–6, T Allan 1–0, R McHugh 0–3, F Daly 0–1, K Cunningham 0–1.	Referee: P Casserly (Westmeath)

7 June 1993 Quarter-final	Offaly	0–13 – 0–11	Carlow	O'Connor Park, Tullamore
	P Brady 0–5, V Claffey 0–3, S Grennan 0–1, D Kelly 0–1, C Ryan 0–1, R Mooney 0–1, D Foley 0–1.		J Nevin 0–6, S Kavanagh 0–2, W Quinlan 0–2, J Hayden 0–1.	Attendance: 14000; Referee: P O'Toole (Longford)

7 June 1993 Quarter-final	Dublin	2–11 – 0–8	Westmeath	O'Connor Park, Tullamore
	K Barr 1–2, V Murphy 1–1, P Clarke 0–3, P Curran 0–1, M Deegan 0–1, J Sheedy 0–1, D Farrell 0–1, J Gavin 0–1.		G Heavin 0–7, T Ormsby 0–1.	Referee: N Whelan (Wexford)

13 June 1993 Quarter-final	Laois	0–7 – 1–12	Meath	O'Moore Park, Portlaoise
	M Turley 0–6, L Irwin 0–1.		B Stafford 1–4, PJ Gillic 0–3, J Devine 0–2, L McCormack 0–1, C O'Rourke 0–1, C Brady 0–1.	Referee: B White (Wexford)

Semi-finals

27 June 1993 Semi-final	Kildare	2–14 – 0–9	Offaly	O'Moore Park, Portlaoise
	N Buckley 1–6, D Doyle 1–1, A Rainbow 0–2, P McLoughlin 0–2, L Miley 0–1, M Lynch 0–1, G Ryan 0–1.		P Brady 0–3, P Spollen 0–3, P Dunne 0–2, P Moran 0–1.	Attendance: 24000; Referee: J Woods (Dublin)

4 July 1993 Semi-final	Dublin	1–10 – 0–12	Meath	Croke Park, Dublin
	C Redmond 1–7, J Sheedy 0–1, N Guiden 0–1, V murphy 0–1.		C O'Rourke 0–5, B Stafford 0–3, PJ Gillic 0–2, J McDermott 0–1, T Dowd 0–1.	Referee: T Howard (Kildare)

Final

25 July 1993 Final	Dublin	0–11 – 0–7	Kildare	Croke Park, Dublin
	C Redmond 0–5, V Murphy 0–1, P Bealin 0–1, D Farrell 0–1, P Gilroy 0–1, M Galvin 0–1, J Barr 0–1.		N Buckley 0–4, D Kerrigan 0–1, J McDonald 0–1, S McGovern 0–1.	Referee: T McDermott (Cavan)

=== Ulster Senior Football Championship ===
Preliminary round

16 May 1993 Preliminary round	Fermanagh	1–9 – 1–9	Armagh	St. Molaise Park, Irvinestown
	C McCreesh 1–3, M O'Rourke 0–2, M Gallagher 0–2, C Curran 0–1, P Brewster 0–1.		G Houlihan 1–3, S McConville 0–2, B O'Hagan 0–1, J Rafferty 0–1, J Toner 0–1.	Attendance: 8,000; Referee: G McClorey (Antrim)

23 May 1993 Preliminary round replay	Armagh	4–8 – 1–16	Fermanagh	Athletic Grounds, Armagh
	D Hollywood 2–1, B O'Hagan 0–4, J Grimley 1–0, G Houlihan 1–0, O Reel 0–2, G Smyth 0–1.		R Gallagher 1–6, M Gallagher 0–3, M O'Rourke 0–2, G McGovern 0–1, C Curran 0–1, R Curran 0–1, B Carty 0–1, B Bradley 0–1.	Referee: G McClorey (Antrim)

Quarter-finals

23 May 1993 Quarter-final	Monaghan	2–9 – 0–15	Cavan	St. Mary's Park, Castleblayney
	R McCarron 2–3, D Byrne 0–1, K Hughes 0–1, S McGinnity 0–1, N Marron 0–1, G Moen 0–1.		R Carolan 0–10, S King 0–1, T Smyth 0–1, S Donohoe 0–1, F Cahill 0–1, D Keoghan 0–1.	Referee: D Campbell (Fermanagh)

30 May 1993 Quarter-final replay	Cavan	2–8 – 3–10	Monaghan	Breffni Park, Cavan

30 May 1993 Quarter-final	Down	0–9 – 3–11	Derry	Páirc an Iúir, Newry
	R Carr 0–5, G Mason 0–2, M Linden 0–1, P Withnell 0–1.		E Burns 1–1, A Tohill 0–4, R Ferris 1–0, D Heaney 1–0, D cassidy 0–3, E Gormley 0–2, D Barton 0–1.

6 June 1993 Quarter-final	Donegal	0–12 – 0–9	Antrim	MacCumhaill Park, Ballybofey
	M Boyle 0–4, M McHugh 0–3, J McGuinness 0–2, B Murray 0–2, N Hegarty 0–1.		F Wilson 0–4, D Armstrong 0–2, J Kennedy 0–2, B Drake 0–1.	Referee: P McEneaney (Monaghan)

13 June 1993 Quarter-final	Armagh	0–13 – 1–10	Tyrone	Athletic Grounds, Armagh
	J Toner 0–8, G Houlihan 0–2, N Smyth 0–1, K McGurk 0–1, J Grimley 0–1.		M McGleenan 1–2, E McCaffrey 0–5, C Corr 0–2, K Loughran 0–1.	Referee: T McDermott (Cavan)

20 June 1993 Quarter-final replay	Tyrone	0–12 – 2–8	Armagh	Healy Park, Omagh
	C Corr 0–3, A McCaffrey 0–2, H Douglas 0–2, K Loughran 0–2, P Donaghy 0–1, M McGleenan 0–1, P Canavan 0–1.		K McGurk 1–3, G Houlihan 1–1, J Toner 0–2, D Marsden 0–1, D Macken 0–1.	Attendance: 15,000; Referee: T McDermott (Cavan)

Semi-finals

20 June 1993 Semi-final	Derry	0–19 – 0–11	Monaghan	Casement Park, Belfast
	E Gormley 0–7, A Tohill 0–5, J Brolly 0–3, K Diamond 0–1, B McGilligan 0–1, D Cassidy 0–1, D Heaney 0–1.		R McCarron 0–3, G Moen 0–2, E Murphy 0–2, M Slowey 0–1, S McGinnity 0–1, G Flanagan 0–1, G Hoey 0–1.	Referee: G McClory (Antrim)

27 June 1993 Semi-final	Donegal	0–15 – 1–12	Armagh	Breffni Park, Cavan
	D Bonner 0–7, M Boyle 0–3, J Duffy 0–2, N Hegarty 0–1, D Reid 0–1, M McShane 0–1.		J Toner 0–6, K McGurk 1–0, M McQuillan 0–2, G Houlihan 0–2, D Mackin 0–1, J Burns 0–1.	Referee: M Cranny (Down)

4 July 1993 Semi-final replay	Donegal	2–16 – 1–7	Armagh	Breffni Park, Cavan
	M Boyle 0–4, M McShane 1–0, J Duffy 1–0, M McHugh 0–3, D Bonner 0–3, D Boyle 0–1, P Carr 0–1, B Murray 0–1, J McGuinness 0–1.		J Toner 0–5, G Houlihan 1–1, C Hannratty 0–1.	Referee: M Cranny (Down)

Final

18 July 1993 Final	Derry	0–8 – 0–6	Donegal	St. Tiernach's Park, Clones
	E Gormely 0–3, D Cassidy 0–2, A Tohill 0–1, D Barton 0–1, D Heaney 0–1.		M Boyle 0–2, D Bonner 0–1, J McMullan 0–1, M McHugh 0–1, J Duffy 0–1.	Attendance: 27,000; Referee: T McDermott (Cavan)

=== Connacht Senior Football Championship ===
Quarter-finals

30 May 1993 Quarter-final	Galway	1–11 – 1–12	Leitrim	Tuam Stadium, Tuam
	J Fallon 0–5, F Galvin 1–1, F O'Neill 0–3, V Daly 0–1, T Wilson 0–1.		L Conlon 1–1, B Breen 0–3, G Dugdale 0–3, P Kenny 0–2, A Rooney 0–2, J Ward 0–1.	Attendance: 7,000; Referee: J Kearney (Roscommon)

6 June 1993 Quarter-final	London	0–9 – 0–12	Sligo	Emerald GAA Grounds, Ruislip
	E Prenter 0–4, J Landy 0–2, T Maguire 0–2, G Feeron 0–1.		F Feeney 0–8, T Deignan 0–1, B Mulhern 0–1, B Kilcoyne 0–1, D Hannon 0–1.	Attendance: 2,000; Referee: S McHale (Mayo)

Semi-finals

20 June 1993 Semi-final	Sligo	1–6 – 1–13	Mayo	Markievicz Park, Sligo
	F Feeney 1–2, S Tully 0–2, T Deignan 0–1, P Seevers 0–1.		R Dempsey 1–6, T Morley 0–3, J Jennings 0–2, L McHale 0–1, P Fallon 0–1.	Referee: S Prior (Leitrim)

27 June 1993 Semi-final	Leitrim	1–10 – 1–12	Roscommon	Páirc Sheáin Mhic Dhiarmada, Carrick-on-Shannon
	A Rooney 0–4, L Conlon 1–0, D Darcy 0–2, P Kenny 0–2, B Breen 0–2.		P Earley 1–1, D Duggan 0–4, T Ryan 0–3, L Dowd 0–2, D Connellan 0–1, E McManus 0–1.	Attendance: 14,000; Referee: M Curley (Galway)

Final

25 July 1993 Final	Roscommon	0–7 – 1–5	Mayo	Dr. Hyde Park, Roscommon
	D Duggan 0–5, D Donlon 0–1, T Grehan 0–1.		R Dempsey 1–1, K O'Neill 0–3, K Staunton 0–1.	Attendance: 26,000; Referee: M Curley (Galway)

== All-Ireland Senior Football Championship ==
Semi-finals; 15/22 August
Cork	5–15
Mayo	0–10
Derry	0–15
Dublin	0–14

Final; 19 September
Derry	1–14
Cork	2–08

Semi-finals

15 August 1993 Semi-final	Cork	5–15 – 0–10	Mayo	Croke Park, Dublin
	C Corkery 1–6, J O'Driscoll 1–3, J Kavanagh 1–1, B Coffey 1–1, M McCarthy 1–0, D Culloty 0–2, D Davis 0–2.		K O'Neill 0–5, L McHale 0–2, R Dempsey 0–1, R Golding 0–1, P Brogan 0–1.	Attendance: 30,523; Referee: B White (Wexford)

22 August 1993 Semi-final	Derry	0–15 – 0–14	Dublin	Croke Park, Dublin
	E Gormley 0–7, A Tohill 0–2, H Downey 0–2, G Coleman 0–1, B McGilligan 0–1, J Brolly 0–1, J McGurk 0–1.		C Redmond 0–8, P Gilroy 0–2, P Clarke 0–1, P Bealin 0–1, P Curran 0–1, E Heery 0–1.	Attendance: 62,643; Referee: T. Sugrue (Kerry)

Final

19 September 1993 Final	Derry	1–14 – 2–8	Cork	Croke Park, Dublin
	E Gormley 0–6, S Downey 1–0, T Tohill 0–3, J McGurk 0–2, J Brolly 0–1, B McGilligan 0–1, D McNicholl 0–1.		C Corkery 0–5, J Kavanagh 1–1, J O'Driscoll 1–0, S Fahy 0–1, T Davis 0–1.	Attendance: 65,500; Referee: T Howard (Kildare)

== Championship statistics ==
=== Scoring ===
Overall

Rank	Player	County	Tally	Total	Matches	Average
1	Colin Corkery	Cork	3–31	40	5	8.00
2	Enda Gormley	Derry	0–25	25	5	5.00
3	Peter Lambert	Tipperary	2–17	23	3	7.66
3	Charlie Redmond	Dublin	1–20	23	3	7.66
3	John Toner	Armagh	0–23	23	5	4.60
6	Ger Houlahan	Armagh	4–8	20	5	4.00
6	Niall Buckley	Kildare	1–17	20	3	6.66

Player	County	Scores	Total
Ray McCarron	Monaghan	3-09	18
Mick Turley	Laois	1–13	16
Peter Brady	Offaly	0–16	16

=== Miscellaneous ===
- On 30 May 1993, in Tuam Stadium, Tuam, Leitrim recorded their first win over Galway since 1949.
- On 20 June 1993, the Munster semi-final game between Tipperary vs Waterford was the first game to be played at Walsh Park, Waterford for 36 years.
- Tipperary reached their first Munster final since 1944 and was first without Kerry since 1957.
- The All Ireland between Dublin and Derry was Derry's first championship wins over Dublin after Dublin having win in the 1958 All Ireland final and 1975 All Ireland semi-final.
- The All-Ireland final between Cork and Derry was a unique occasion as it was the first ever championship meeting between the two teams. Derry, who were appearing in only their second All-Ireland final and their first since 1958, won the championship for the first and only time in their history. Prime Minister of Australia Paul Keating was a guest of Taoiseach Albert Reynolds at the match. A crowd control gate at the Canal End had to be opened during the match to allow 120 people, mainly women and children, onto the sideline. It was the last All-Ireland final to be played before the complete renovation of Croke Park.
