= Jim McKeever =

Derry Gaelic footballer (1930–2023)

Personal information
- Nickname: Gentleman Jim
- Born: 6 December 1930 Ballymaguigan, County Londonderry, Northern Ireland
- Died: 5 April 2023 (aged 92)
- Occupation: Teacher/lecturer (retired)
- Height: 5 ft 10 in (178 cm)

Sport
- Sport: Gaelic football
- Position: Midfield
Clubs
- Years: Club
- 1957–≈1970 Late 1940s–Mid1950s 1953–1956 ?–?: Ballymaguigan; Newbridge; Downpatrick; Leicester Young Irelands
Club titles
- Derry titles: 3
Inter-county
Years	County	Apps (scores)
1948–1962	Derry	?
Inter-county titles
- Ulster titles: 1

James McKeever (6 December 1930 – 5 April 2023) was a Northern Irish Gaelic footballer who played for the Derry county team in the late 1940s, 1950s and early 1960s and played club football for St Trea's GFC Ballymaguigan and Seán O'Leary's GAC Newbridge. He was captain of the Derry side that finished runners-up to Dublin in the 1958 All-Ireland Senior Football Championship.

== Career ==
McKeever was a very versatile player as evidenced by his playing in all positions with the exception of goalkeeper and wing half-back during his Derry career. He started out his inter-county career as a half-forward, but is chiefly remembered as a midfielder for both club and county and has been frequently described as "one of the greatest midfielders of all time". He was renowned for his high-fielding ability – described by Kerry legend Mick O'Connell as the best catcher he ever played against. Other skills in his repertoire include his surging runs forwards from midfield, shooting accuracy and free taking ability. McKeever was named in the Football Team of the Century comprising players who never won an All-Ireland. He played an "inspirational role" in helping put Derry on the GAA map.

After retiring from playing, he served as manager of a number of teams. In 2009 he was named in the Sunday Tribune's list of the 125 Most Influential People in GAA History. Former Tyrone manager Art McRory said of McKeever: "That man has done more to promote the GAA than any other person I know."

== Background and personal life ==
McKeever was born in 1931 into a GAA interested home, in the small townland of Ballymaguigan on the western shores of Lough Neagh. He went to the local St Trea's primary school where he helped develop his football skills, before boarding at St Malachy's College, Belfast. The first inter-county football game he attended was Derry versus Leitrim in a 1938 National League playoff game with his father, and the quarter-final defeat to Roscommon a week later. He looked up to players who played for local team Newbridge at the time (the Ballymaguigan team hadn't been formed yet), such as Barney Murphy and John McGrogan. McKeever said: "To me they were heroes at that stage". He also admired Mick Higgins of Cavan.

After finishing school at St Malachy's, he continued his studies at St Mary's Training College in Belfast. He completed his studies at Loughborough College in England. After returning to Ireland, he taught PE and other subjects in Downpatrick, County Down. In 1957 he returned to St Mary's in Belfast, this time as a lecturer, and would spend the rest of his working life at the college until his retirement in 1992. McKeever later lived in Magherafelt with his wife Teresa, whom he married in 1958. They had three daughters, Ann, Maeve and Deirdre, and two sons, Éamonn and Jim.

McKeever died on 6 April 2023, at the age of 92.

== Football career ==
=== Inter-county ===
McKeever's first inter-county football came as a member of the Antrim minor team in 1947. He recalled "Organised minor football was only really getting started in Derry at the time and the first experience I had of playing intercounty football was with the Antrim minors". The following year he lined out for Derry minors, losing to eventual All-Ireland Minor Champions at the Ulster semi-final stage. Some of that Derry minor side would graduate to the senior team and would be an integral part of the big upwards strides Derry would make in the 1950s.

As a 17-year-old, McKeever made his Derry senior debut in a challenge match in 1948, and was a first-team regular by the following year. He played at half forward in the early part of his Derry career, later changing to midfield. In 1950 he flew back from England to play a significant role in Derry's Dr Lagan Cup success. That year Derry were also victorious in the Ulster Junior Championship. They beat Limerick in the All-Ireland Junior Championship semi-final, a game in which he marked Kerry legend Eoin Liston's father, a fact McKeever didn't find out until 50 years later. Derry met Mayo in the final, but lost a close game by two points on a scoreline of 4–03 to 2–07.

1955 proved to be a turning point for Derry as they reached their first Ulster Senior Championship final in 34 years. They were beaten by Cavan by three points, and reached the decider again two years later, only to be beaten by two points to Tyrone. Before the 1958 Championship, Derry played in the inaugural Wembley Tournament (an exhibition competition to allow Irish emigrants in England a chance to see Gaelic football) in Wembley Stadium in London, England. They beat reigning Ulster Champions Tyrone in a play-off to decide who would go to the tournament, but were defeated by Galway in the tournament itself. In 1958, McKeever captained Derry to the county's first ever Ulster Senior Championship success, beating Down in the final by four points (1–11 to 2–04). He said in a 1993 book that the team had been together for three or four years and "when you get to a final for the third time it is time to win it". On 24 August, Derry caused one of the biggest shocks in the history of Gaelic football when the first-time Ulster champions beat Kerry in the All-Ireland semi-final 2-06 to 2–05. They met Dublin in that year's All-Ireland final and, despite McKeever being "by far and away the outstanding player on view", Derry were defeated. It has been claimed a series of poor refereeing decisions in that game cost Derry greatly, but McKeever himself refuses to make any excuses saying in a 2002 interview, "It was an exceptionally good Dublin team". For his performances in the 1958 Championship, he was awarded the inaugural Texaco Footballer of the Year award. Along with Meath's Colm O'Rourke in 1991, he is the only player who has won the award, despite not being part of that year's All-Ireland winning team. His brother Dennis also played for Derry and was alongside Jim in the 1958 team.

The 1950s was a decade of very high standards of football and was a very difficult era to win an All-Ireland, with the likes of Mayo, Galway, Kerry, Louth, Cavan, Meath and Dublin having very strong teams at the time. Unfortunately for Derry, they never quite managed to keep that team together, and failed to win another Ulster title during McKeever's (who was 27 at the time of the final) career. They did, however, reach the National League final in both 1958/59 and 1960/61, but they lost out to Kerry on both occasions, partly due to key forward Sean O'Connell being suspended for both deciders.

=== Club ===
In the late 1940s he was asked to play an important game for the Newbridge minor team and despite Ballymaguigan having recently been set up he decided to stay with the Newbridge club for the time being. He won the first two of his three Derry Senior Football Championship medals with the club in 1948 and 1950. While at college in England he lined out for the Leicester Young Ireland's club and during his time in Downpatrick (1953–1956), he played for the Downpatrick club.

From 1957 onwards he played for his native Ballymaguigan. Winning the South Derry Championship in 1957 (where McKeever excelled in the final), Ballymaguigan qualified for the Derry Championship final (the Derry Championship was not open-draw until 1958, up to then separate South Derry, North Derry and Derry City Championships were played with the three winners then battling it out for the [All-]Derry Senior Football Championship). They were beaten by Ballerin in the Derry decider, also finishing Derry Championship runners-up to Bellaghy in 1958 and 1961. The 1961 final did not take place, Ballymaguigan had asked the County Board to delay the match, as some players were unavailable, the County Board refused and awarded the title to Bellaghy. In 1958, the club however did win the Seán Larkin Cup, which had replaced the South Derry Championship – and retained it the following year. Despite the disappointment of losing three Championship finals in a few years, the club won their only Derry Senior Championship to date in 1962 against Castledawson, with McKeever being an important part of the team. His brothers Dennis, Eddie and Frank also won county medals with the club that year, while another brother, Seán, also played for The 'Quiggan at the time. Ballymaguigan also won the Derry Senior League in 1962, giving the club a famous double. They went that year's league undefeated. Ballymaguigan's fortunes took a downturn as the 1960s progressed and were a Junior club by the end of the decade. Despite being 39/40?, in 1970 McKeever (who converted seven frees in the last 20 minutes) put in a man of the match display as Ballymaguigan won the South Derry Junior Championship, defeating Greenlough in the final. They went on to win the [All-]Derry Junior Championship, beating Drum in the semi-final and Seán Dolans in the final.

=== Province ===
McKeever was a regular of the great Ulster team of the 1950s – playing for Ulster on 11 consecutive years. He won two Railway Cups with the province – starring at midfield on the 1956 team that beat Munster in the final, and at centre half forward on the 1960 victorious side, also against Munster.

=== International ===
McKeever represented Ireland against the Combined Universities team regularly during his career. Before the commencement of the GAA All Stars Awards in 1971, being picked to represent your country was the equivalent. When 19, he was a sub on the team and went on to be selected for five of the next six years (with the competition not held the other year).

=== School/college ===
Underage football wasn't very well organised when McKeever was young and it was at St. Malachy's College in Belfast that his career started to flourish. He captained the school to two consecutive MacRory Cup finals in 1948 and 1949, but they lost out on both occasions to St. Patrick's, Cavan and St. Colman's, Newry respectively. While there, he made the Ulster intercolleges team for two seasons, saying "I was on the team for two years and making that side really lifted my aspirations a lot. The intercolleges competition was a very big one at the time and I felt privileged to be there."

While at St Mary's Training College, he played with them in the Antrim leagues.

=== Basketball ===
McKeever also represented Ulster at basketball.

== Post-playing career ==
=== Management ===
After retiring from football, he had a long coaching career. McKeever was manager of the Derry senior team on three separate occasions. In 1964, along with Joe Lennon and Jim McDonnell, McKeever ran the first-ever residential GAA coaching course in Gormanston. He led St Mary's for 35 years (i.e. his whole teaching career there from 1957 onwards) and along with Peter Finn, he guided the college to their only Sigerson Cup triumph in 1989, and is credited with greatly improving the standard of football at the college during his time there. That Sigerson success was viewed as a major surprise, the club having only entered the competition from 1988. The college also won five Ryan Cups during his time there (1970, 1971, 1978, 1981 and 1983). His coaching at St Mary's influenced other coaches and players, such as Art McRory, Mickey Harte, Peter Canavan and Peter McGinnity. He is the only man ever to hold the roles of captain, chairman, president and manager of St Mary's and was elected Life President in 1999. As manager he led Ulster to Railway Cups in 1970 and 1987. He also trained the Derry Under 21 hurlers to victory in the 1993 Ulster Under-21 Hurling Championship.

=== Other ===
McKeever was elected Chairman of the Derry County Board in December 1997 and was in the position when Derry won the 1998 Ulster Championship. He has also been a Central Council delegate. McKeever won the Services to GAA award at the 1993 Ulster GAA Writer's Association Awards.

== Honours ==
=== County ===
- All-Ireland Senior Football Championship:
  - Runner up: 1958
- National Football League:
  - Runner up: 1958–1959, 1960–1961
- Ulster Senior Football Championship:
  - Winner (1): 1958
  - Runner up: 1955, 1957
- Dr Lagan Cup:
  - Winner (4): 1950, 1953, 1959, 1961
- All-Ireland Junior Football Championship:
  - Runner up: 1950
- Ulster Junior Football Championship:
  - Winner (1): 1950

=== Province ===
- Railway Cup – Winner (2): 1956, 1960

=== Club ===
- Derry Senior Football Championship – Winner (3): 1948, 1950, 1962
- Derry Junior Football Championship – Winner (1): 1970
- Underage awards

=== College ===
- MacRory Cup – Runner up: 1948, 1949

=== Individual ===
- Texaco Footballer of the Year: 1958
- Captain Derry All-Ireland runners up side: 1958

Note: The above lists may be incomplete. Please add any other honours you know of.
