= Drum GAC =

Derry-based Gaelic games club

St Colm's GAC Drum
- CLG Naomh Colm An Droim
- Founded: 1937
- County: Derry
- Colours: Orange, green and green
- Grounds: St Colm's Park
- Coordinates: 54°57′28.23″N 6°59′09.89″W

Playing kits
Standard colours

Saint Colm's GAC Drum (Irish: CLG Naomh Colm An Droim) is a Gaelic Athletic Association club based in the rural area of Drum and Gortnahey, near Dungiven, County Londonderry, Northern Ireland. The club is a member of Derry GAA.

Drum fields Gaelic football teams at U8, U10, U12, U14 and Senior levels. They currently compete in the Derry Junior Football Championship and Division 2 of the Derry ACFL. The U16 and Minor teams are amalgamated with Drumsurn and play as St Patrick's.

Drum has won the Derry Junior Football Championship seven times. Underage teams up to U-12s play in North Derry league and championships, from U-13 upwards teams compete in All-Derry competitions.

The club also has a number of camogie sides at various age groups. Drum won the 2003 Derry Intermediate Hurling Championship but no longer competes in hurling.

== History ==
A club was set up in the area around 1918 and was known as O'Carolan's Gortnaghey. St Colms's GAC Drum was officially founded in 1937. The club's first major honour came in 1940 when it won the Dr Kerlin Cup and in 1941 it won the club's biggest honour to date; the Derry Senior Football League. Five years later, after winning the North Derry Senior Football Championship, the club reached the Derry Senior Football Championship final, only to be denied by Magherafelt in a close encounter. Drum reached another Derry Senior Championship final in 1956, but was defeated by Bellaghy. In that year Eugene McCaul and Séamus McCloskey from Drum were part of Derry's first ever All-Ireland Minor Football Championship winning side.

In the late 1960s and early 1970s Drum and rivals Foreglen combined to play as Muldonagh, but soon went their separate ways again. Peter Stevenson from the club won an All Star in 1975 for his performance for Derry in that year's Championship. Having slipped down to the Junior ranks, in 1977 Drum won the Derry Junior Football Championship, Division 3 of the League and the Neil Carlin Cup. In 1974 Drum reached the first of their four Derry Intermediate Football Championship finals, losing out to Glack. Greenlough denied them in the 1976 decider, Glen in 1983 and Moneymore in 1984.

In 1989 St Colm's opened their new pitch at a cost of £75,000. It was opened by Bishop Francis Lagan at an Antrim versus Kilkenny hurling match followed by a Derry versus Meath football match. In the same year the club received the Gerry Crossan Memorial Cup for North Derry Club of the Year.

In 1992 Drum's Neil Farren, Seán More, Shauna McCaul and Julie Colgan all won Derry handball titles. St Colm's became Derry Junior Football Champions again in 1994, with a victory over Eoghan Rua in the final. A new pavilion was completed in May 1995 and Drum won the following year's Neil Carlin Cup with victory over Doire Colmcille CLG, and won the club's fifth Derry Junior Championship. Cousins Neil and Eoighin Farren were rewarded with Bank of Ireland Colleges All Stars following their performances for St. Patrick's College, Maghera. Drum retained the Neil Carlin Cup in 1997 with victory over Ardmore.

In 2000 St Colm's won the Fair Play League, rewarding their sporting conduct both on and off the field. Drum hurler Shane McCartney claimed consecutive Ulster Senior Hurling Championships with Derry in 2000 and 2001. The club won the Derry Intermediate Hurling Championship in 2003 and the club's sixth Junior Football Championship came in 2006 after a comeback against Lissan. Drum also made it to the final in 2007 but lost to Lissan. In 2008, under the management of former Derry captain Joe Irwin, they lost a promotion playoff to Limavady.

In August 2012 Drum won its seventh JFC title, defeating Ardmore by 2–16 to 1–8.

In 2016, Drum won the junior league for the first time in 13 years, going through the season with just one defeat. They lost that year's junior championship final to Magilligan, having lost the previous year's decider to Faughanvale after a replay.

=== Camogie ===
Shauna McCaul added her name to the growing list of Drum players to claim All-Ireland honours as she helped the Derry Camogs clinch a memorable victory over Cork in the Junior All-Ireland Championship. Ann O’Reilly joined the Derry team in 2003 to clinch a Senior Ulster championship title as did her younger sibling Shona, who won an Ulster Minor Championship title with Derry Camogie team in 2002.

== Honours ==
=== Gaelic football ===
==== Senior ====
- Derry Senior Football League: 1
  - 1941
- Derry Junior Football League:
  - 2000, 2016
- Neal Carlin Cup Winners
  - 2016
- Derry Junior Football Championship: 7
  - 1973, 1977, 1982, 1994, 1996, 2006, 2012
- Dr Kerlin Cup: 1
  - 1940

==== Minor ====
- North Derry Minor 'B' Football Championship: 1
  - 1994
- Neil Carlin Cup: 5
  - 1977, 1996, 1997, 2007, 2016

=== Hurling ===
==== Senior ====
- Derry Intermediate Hurling Championship: ?
  - 2003

==== Camogie ====
- Junior League & Championship Winners 2011

== Notable players ==
- Peter Stevenson – All Star winning Derry footballer. Also played hurling for Drum and Dungiven.

== See also ==
- List of Gaelic games clubs in Derry
