= Kieran McKeever =

Personal information
- Native name: Ciarán Mac Íomhair (Irish)
- Born: 12 March 1968 (age 58) County Londonderry, Northern Ireland
- Occupation: Joiner
- Height: 5 ft 8 in (173 cm)

Sport
- Football Position: Right Corner Back
- Hurling Position: Half forward
Clubs
- Years: Club
- Dungiven & Kevin Lynch's
Club titles
	Football	Hurling
Derry titles	3	5/6/7/8?
Ulster titles	1	-
Inter-county
- Years: County
- 1988–2001: Derry
Inter-county titles
	Football	Hurling
Ulster Titles	2	2
All-Ireland Titles	1	-
League titles	4	-
All-Stars	1	-

Kieran McKeever (born 12 March 1968) is a former dual player of Gaelic games who played Gaelic football and hurling for Derry during the late 1980s, 1990s and early 2000s. He is chiefly known as a footballer and was part of Derry's 1993 All-Ireland Senior Football Championship winning side, also won Ulster Senior Football Championships in 1993 and 1998. With Derry footballers he usually played at corner-back and is regarded as one of the best defenders and tightest markers to have played the game.

In 2000 McKeever became the first Ulster player to be nominated for All Stars in both football and hurling in the same season. He won the football All Star, but narrowly missed out on the hurling accolade. Had he have won the double All Star, he would have become only the second player ever after Cork legend Ray Cummins to win both awards in the same year.

He has won Irish News Ulster All-Star awards and was named right-corner back on the Irish News Team of the Decade in 2004. The public voted him onto the All-Time Derry Football Team via an online poll in 2007. McKeever played club football with St. Canice's GAC Dungiven and club hurling with Kevin Lynchs.

== Early life ==
Kieran McKeever was born into a footballing household. His father Thomas was a Derry minor panelist in the mid-1960s and his brothers Emmet and Cathal have both represented Derry and New York at hurling and football. In 2008 Cathal transferred to Tyrone side Carrickmore.

His abilities as a dual player were nurtured at St Patrick's Secondary School by former Derry footballers Seán O'Connell, Fintan McCloskey and Francie Brolly and Kilkenny born hurling coach Liam Hinphey. He also excelled at athletics at school, particularly the high jump.

== Football career ==
=== Inter-county ===
He captained quite a few successful underage teams including the Derry minor side that were runners up to Down in the Ulster Championship team in 1986. He played the game at Right half back, despite having a fractured arm.

McKeever made his Derry senior debut in February 1988 against Monaghan in the Dr McKenna Cup at Greenlough. McKeever was Right Corner Back on Derry's 1993 All-Ireland winning team, which beat Cork in the final. McKeever also won an Ulster Championship medal that year and won a second in 1998, where he captained the team.

He won four National Football League medals with Derry in 1992, 1995, 1996, 2000. He was corner back on three of those sides and Centre half back on the 2000 team. McKeever and Derry finished runners-up to Offaly in the 1998 National League decider, with McKeever as captain. Having been previously nominated three times for an All Star (1991, 1992 and 1996), McKeever finally received one in 2000. McKeever also won numerous Interprovincial Championship/Railway Cup medals with Ulster.

=== Club ===
McKeever won his first senior county football medal as Dungiven won the 1987 Derry Championship. and added a second in 1991. In 1997 McKeever was part of the Dungiven side that won another Derry Championship and Ulster Club Championship.

Among his underage achievements, McKeever has won an Under-14, Under-16, and two Derry Minor Football Championships. He has also won two All-Ireland special medals.

== Hurling career ==
=== Inter-county ===
Among McKeever's hurling honours was winning the Ulster Under 21 Hurling Championship with Derry in 1986, defeating Antrim and Down along the way. They beat Down in the final after a reply; 3-09 to 1-02. In the drawn final McKeever suffered a serious injury.

McKeever started his senior inter-county hurling career in 1987 and played until 1992, when he decided to concentrate on football. He returned to the Derry hurling team in 1999 and for his performances in helping Derry win the 2000 Ulster Hurling Championship, he was nominated as an All Star. McKeever won a second Ulster Hurling Championship in 2001 also represented and captained Ulster in hurling in the Railway Cup.

=== Club ===
McKeever was part of the Kevin Lynchs U-14 side that captured the B section of 1982 Féile na nGael in Dublin and won county medals at all possible grades.

== Honours ==
=== Football ===
==== County ====
- All-Ireland Senior Football Championship - Winner (1): 1993
- National Football League - Winner (4): 1992, 1995, 1996, 2000
- National Football League - Runner up: 1998
- Ulster Senior Football Championship - Winner (2): 1993, 1998
- Ulster Senior Football Championship - Runner up: 1992, 1997, 2000
- Dr McKenna Cup - Winner (1): 1993, 1999
- Ulster Minor Football Championship - Runner up: 1986

==== Club ====
- Ulster Senior Club Football Championship - Winner (1): 1997
- Derry Senior Football Championship - Winner (3): 1987, 1991, 1997
- Derry Senior Football Championship - Runner up: 1996
- Derry Senior Football League - Winner (2): 1990, 1991
- Derry Minor Football Championship - Winner (2): 1985, 1986
- Derry U-16 Football Championship - Winner (1): 1983
- North Derry U-16 Football Championship - Winner (1): 1983
- Derry U-14 Football Championship - Winner (1): 1982
- Other underage awards

==== Province ====
- Railway Cup - Winner (5/6?) – 1992?, 1993, 1994, 1995, 1998, 2000?

==== Individual ====
- All Star - Winner (1): 2000
- All Star - Nominated (runner up): 1991, 1992, 1996
- Irish News Ulster All Stars Team of the Decade (1995–2004) - Winner
- Irish News Ulster GAA All-Star - Winner (?): Years?
- Derry Senior football captain: 1997–1998
- Derry Minor football captain: 1986

=== Hurling ===
==== County ====
- Ulster Senior Hurling Championship - Winner (2): 2000, 2001
- Ulster Senior Hurling Championship - Runner up: 1998?, 1999?, 2003?
- Ulster Under 21 Hurling Championship - Winner (1): 1986, 1987?????

==== Club ====
- Ulster Senior Club Hurling Championship - Runner up: 2003?, 2006?, 2007?
- Derry Senior Hurling Championship - Winner (9??): 1984, 1987, 1989, 1996, 1998, 2003?, 2004?, 2006?, 2007?
- Derry Senior Hurling Championship - Runner up: 1986?, 1991, 1999, 2005?
- 'B' Féile na nGael - Winner (1): 1982
- Numerous underage awards including U-14 Derry Hurling Championship

==== Individual ====
- All Star - Nominated (runner up): 2000
- Ulster Railway Cup captain: Years?

Note: The above lists may be incomplete. Please add any other honours you know of.

Gaelic games
Preceded by Henry Downey	Derry senior football captain 1997–1998	Succeeded by Anthony Tohill
