= Enda Gormley =

Derry Gaelic footballer

Personal information
- Born: 8 March 1966 (age 60) County Londonderry, Northern Ireland
- Occupation: Businessman
- Height: 5 ft 10 in (178 cm)

Sport
- Sport: Gaelic football
- Position: Forward
Clubs
- Years: Club
- Glen; Bredagh
Inter-county
- Years: County
- 1985–2000: Derry
Inter-county titles
- Ulster titles: 3
- All-Irelands: 1
- NFL: 3
- All Stars: 2

Enda Gormley (born 8 March 1966) is a Gaelic footballer who played for the Derry county team in the 1980s, 1990s and early 2000s. He played club football with Maghera club Glen, and currently plays with Belfast club Bredagh.

Gormley was part of Derry's 1993 All-Ireland Championship winning side and is one of the county's highest ever scorers. Enda Gormley is one of only six Derry players who have won two All Stars. He was named at Left corner forward on the 1992 and 1993 All Star teams. He is an expert free-taker.

Gormley has had to overcome two serious knee injuries in his career. He developed cruciate ligament trouble after suffering an injury against Fermanagh in 1989 and had blood poisoning in his leg in late 1991.

== Personal life ==
Enda Gormley was born in Maghera, County Londonderry, Northern Ireland, and is one of four sons born to Joe and Bridie Gormley. His father Joe was part of the Desertmartin side which won the 1953 Derry Senior Football Championship, the club's first and so far only Derry Senior Championship title. Enda attended school at St Patricks College, Maghera, before going onto college at University of Ulster at Jordanstown (UUJ). He commentates on football matches for BBC.

== School and college football ==
While at school St Pat's, Maghera, Gormely won a MacRory Cup medal. He was also on two Sigerson Cup winning sides (1986 and 1987) with Jordanstown and two victorious Ryan Cup teams (1987 and 1988). He was also top scorer in 1986 and 1987 Sigerson finals with 0-05 and 0-03 respectively.

== Inter-county career ==
Gormley first made his inter-county mark as a member of the Derry minor team that claimed the 1984 Ulster Minor Championship.

He made his Derry senior debut in 1985 against Antrim in the National Football League. Having won Ulster Football Championships in 1987, and 1993, he went on to play left corner forward on Derry's 1993 All-Ireland winning team, which beat Cork in the final.

He won three National Football League medals with Derry in 1992, 1995, 1996. He started left corner forward on all three of those sides.

Gormley also won Interprovincial Championship/Railway Cup medals with Ulster. He was top scorer in the Ulster Championship in 1987 with a total score of 0–20 and again in 1992 with 0–25. He won a third Ulster medal in 1998.

He stills plays on occasion for the Derry Over 40 team.

== Club career ==
Gormley was part of Glen's 1983 Derry Intermediate Football Championship winning team. He also won a Derry Senior League medal with the club in 1987. He won a Derry Junior Football Championships in 2005 with Glen Thirds.

Gormley was in the United States for a short period the 1980s and while there played with St. Columbkille's GFC, Boston. He along with fellow Glen man Damien McCusker helped the club win a Boston Senior Football Championship in 1986. Recently he moved club to Bredagh, as he lives in Belfast. As a 42-year-old, 23 years after first playing senior football for Derry, he is still playing.

Gormley is known for being a committed clubman and even travels from his home in Belfast to help train the Glen Under-14 team.

== Honours ==
=== County ===
- 3 Ulster Senior Football Championship 1987 1993 1998
- 3 National Football League Division 1 1992 1995 1996
- 1 All-Ireland Senior Football Championship 1993
- 1 Ulster Minor Football Championship 1984

=== Awards ===
- 2 GAA GPA All Stars Awards 1992 1993

=== School/College ===
- 2 Sigerson Cup 1986 1987
- 2 Ryan Cup 1987 1988
- 2 MacRory Cup 1983 1984

=== Club ===
- Derry Senior Football League – Winner (1): 1987
- Derry Intermediate Football Championship – Winner (1): 1983
- Derry Junior Football Championship – Winner (2): 2004, 2005
- Down Junior Football Championship – Winner (1) 2006
- Boston Senior Football Championship – Winner (1): 1986
