= CLG Ógra Colmcille =

Derry-based Gaelic games club

Ogra Colmcille
- Ógra Colm Cille CLG
- Founded: 1974
- County: Derry
- Nickname: Ógra
- Colours: Green and yellow
- Grounds: Ógra Park
- Coordinates: 54°38′37.79″N 6°39′55.87″W

Playing kits
Ógra Colmcille	Ógra Mór

CLG Ógra Colmcille is a Gaelic Athletic Association club based in Drummullan, County Londonderry, Northern Ireland. The club is a member of Derry GAA and currently competes in gaelic football.

On 12 February 2019 the club withdrew from Division 2 of the Derry Senior Football League but announced their intention to compete in the 2019 Derry Junior Football Championship. They subsequently also withdrew from the Derry Junior Football Championship.

The club has won the Derry Junior Football Championship once. Underage teams up to U-12's play in South Derry league and championships, from Under 13 upwards teams compete in All-Derry competitions.

== Gaelic football ==
Ógra fields Gaelic football teams at Senior level. Underage teams (Under 8, Under 10, Under 12, Under 14, Under 16 and Minor) are amalgamated with Moneymore and form the Ógra Mór team. Sides up to U-12's play in South Derry league and championships, from U-14 upwards teams compete in All-Derry competitions.

== Ladies' Gaelic football ==
Ógra Colmcille ladies' players play along with An Lúb players in the Ardtrea team. The team also draws players from Ballinderry, Lissan, Moneymore and other South Derry clubs along the border with County Tyrone.

== History ==
In 1935 a Drummullan side competed in the South Derry League. They soon however switched league to the East Tyrone League and stayed there until 1946. They won the 1941 Tyrone Junior Football Championship defeating Brackaville in the final. They re-entered the South Derry League in 1947, named Drummullan Sarsfields. In 1954 players from Drummullan and Killybearn reassembled to form Littlebridge Kevin Barrys and reached consecutive Derry Junior Football Championship finals in 1964 and 1965, but lost out to Greenlough and Glen respectively. They did however win the Derry Junior League in 1964.

Kevin Barry's folded in 1974 and amalgamated with St. Patrick's Windmill of Tyrone to form the current Ógra Colmcille club. They won the Junior League in their first year 1975. The current club's biggest success came in 2001 when they won the Derry Junior Championship defeating Ardmore in the final. 2000 saw the club open their new playing field and clubhouse. The club gained promotion to Intermediate football in 2004 after defeating Ardmore in a relegation/promotion playoff and also were runners up in the Junior Championship. However the club was relegated to Junior football the following season. In 2007 they won promotion to Intermediate football in Division 4 after beating local rivals Lissan in the Derry Division 5 Junior league final. Following promotion Ógra Colmcille remained comfortably in Intermediate football finishing mid table in Division 4 in 2008 and 2009. In 2010 the Derry County Board restructured the senior leagues and Ogra Colmcille found themselves competing in Division 2 in Derry and once again the Ógs comfortably retained their intermediate status for 2011.

== Honours ==
=== Senior ===
- Derry Junior League Champions: 3
  - 1964 (as Littlebridge Kevin Barrys), 1975, 2007
  - Runner Up 2004
- Derry Junior Football Championship: 1
  - 2001
  - Runner Up 1964, 1965 (as Littlebridge Kevin Barrys), 2004
- Graham Cup
  - Winner 2011, 2012, 2016
  - Runner Up 2002, 2010, 2017
- Tyrone Junior Football Championship: 1
  - 1941 (as Drummullan)

=== Minor ===
South Derry 9-aside cup Winners 1988

- South Derry Minor 'B' Football Championship: 1
  - 2000
- Tommy O'Neill Cup (All County Derry Minor 'B' Football Championship)
  - Runner Up 2000

=== Ladies ===
- Derry Junior Football Championship: 1
  - 2002 (Ardtrea Ladies)
- All Ireland Junior 7s Champions: 1
  - 2009 (Ardtrea Ladies)

== See also ==
- List of Gaelic games clubs in Derry
