= Damien McCusker =

Irish Gaelic footballer

Personal information
- Native name: D. Mac Oscair (Irish)
- Born: 21 October 1966 (age 60) County Londonderry, Northern Ireland
- Occupation: Civil servant
- Height: 6 ft 2 in (188 cm)

Sport
- Sport: Gaelic football
- Position: Goalkeeper
Club
- Years: Club
- 1983-2007: Glen
Inter-county
| Years | County | Apps (scores) |
| 1984-2000 | Derry | 0-1 |
Inter-county titles
- Ulster titles: 2
- All-Irelands: 1
- NFL: 3

Damien McCusker (born 21 October 1966) is a Gaelic footballer who played for the Derry county team in the 1980s, 1990s and early 2000s. He still plays club football with Watty Graham's GAC Glen. With the exception of the 1989 season, he played as goalkeeper for all his Derry career, while he has played the vast majority of his football out-field for Glen.

McCusker was part of Derry's 1993 All-Ireland Championship winning side, as well as the 1987, 1993 and 1998 Ulster Championship winning teams. The public voted him onto the All-Time Derry Team via an online poll in 2007.

== Early life ==
McCusker was born in Maghera and attended school at St Patricks College in the town. His brother Fergal was also in the 1993 Derry team that won the All-Ireland.

== Career ==
=== School and college football ===
While at St Patrick's College school McCusker won Ulster Colleges Championship medals in 1982, 1983 and 1984.

=== Inter-county ===
McCusker won an Ulster Minor Championship medal in 1984 as part of the successful Derry minor team. He joined the senior team during the 1984/1985 National Football League when 17 years old and made his Derry senior début in late 1984 against Sligo. Having won Ulster Football Championships in 1987 and 1993, he went on to play on Derry's 1993 All-Ireland winning team, which beat Cork in the final and added a third Ulster Championship medal in 1998.

He won National Football League medals with Derry in 1992, 1995, and 1996 and has also won Interprovincial Championship/Railway Cup medals with Ulster. McCusker initially retired from inter-county football in 1998, but returned in 1999, and again in 2000 after then-goalkeeper Eoin McCloskey was suspended.

McCusker has also played on the Derry Masters (Over-40s) team.

=== Club career ===
He was part of the Glen team that won the 1983 Derry Intermediate Championship. McCusker won a Derry Senior League medal with Glen in 1987 and claimed back-to-back Derry Junior Football Championships in 2004 and 2005 with Glen Thirds playing in midfield.

McCusker was in the United States for a short period the 1980s and while there played with St Columbkille's GFC, Boston. He along with fellow Glen man Enda Gormley helped the club win a Boston Senior Football Championship in 1986.

He along with Eamonn Higgins is managing Glen for the 2008 season.

=== Soccer ===
Damien McCusker also had a brief stint playing association football for Ballyclare Comrades F.C. He achieved a then club record of four consecutive clean sheets in 1997.

== Honours ==
=== County ===
- All-Ireland Senior Football Championship - Winner (1): 1993
- National Football League - Winner (3): 1992, 1995, 1996.
- Ulster Senior Football Championship - Winner (2): 1987, 1993.
- Ulster Senior Football Championship - Runner up: 1992.
- Dr McKenna Cup - Winner (1/2?): 1993.
- Ulster Minor Football Championship - Winner (1):1983,1984.

=== Club ===
- Derry Senior Football League - Winner (1): 1987
- Derry Intermediate Football Championship - Winner (1): 1983
- Derry Junior Football Championship - Winner (2): 2004, 2005
- Boston Senior Football Championship - Winner (1): 1986

=== Province ===
- Railway Cup - Winner (?): Years?

=== College ===
- 3 Ulster Colleges medals: 1982, 1983, 1984

=== Individual ===
- All Star - Nominated (runner up)?: ????
- Captain Glen Derry Junior Football Championship winning sides: 2004, 2005

=== Soccer ===
- Ulster Cup 1997/98 Season with Ballyclare Comrades

Note: The above lists may be incomplete. Please add any other honours you know of.
