= James Kielt =

Derry Gaelic footballer

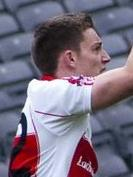

Personal information
- Native name: Séamus Ó Caoilte (Irish)
- Born: 1989 (age 36–37) Derry, Northern Ireland
- Height: 1.9 m (6 ft 3 in)

Sport
- Sport: Gaelic football
- Position: Right Half Forward
Club
- Years: Club
- 2006-: Kilrea
Inter-county
- Years: County
- 2009–2018: Derry
Inter-county titles
- Ulster titles: 2
- All-Irelands: 0
- NFL: 0
- All Stars: 0

James Kielt is a Gaelic footballer who plays for the Pádraig Pearse's Kilrea club and previously for the Derry county team. He played as a forward for both club and county.

== Playing career ==
=== Club ===
Kielt had a very successful underage career with Kilrea.

=== Inter-county ===
Kielt was captain of the Derry Minor team which were runners-up in both the Ulster Minor Championship and All-Ireland Minor Championship in 2007. Earlier that year he won the Ulster Minor Football League with the county. The following year he reached the Ulster Under 21 Championship with Derry Under 21s, but they were also defeated.

In 2009 he was drafted into the Derry Senior side. Derry reached that year's National League final, but were defeated by Kerry. Kielt made his Championship^{A} debut later that year in the Ulster Championship against Monaghan.

After missing the 2012 season and opting out of the 2015 championship, Kielt retired from inter-county football in October 2018.

=== College ===
Kielt started playing for Queen's University Belfast from 2007/08. The university finished runners-up to Donegal in the 2009 Dr McKenna Cup.

== Honours ==
=== Inter-county ===
==== Senior ====
- National Football League:
  - Runner-up: 2009
- Dr McKenna Cup
  - Winner 2011 (Derry)
  - Runners-up: 2009 (with QUB)
  - Ulster Senior football championship

winner (0) runner up (!) 2011

==== Under-21 ====
- Ulster Under-21 Football Championship:
  - Runner up: 2008

==== Minor ====
- All-Ireland Minor Football Championship:
  - Runner up: 2007
- Ulster Minor Football Championship:
  - Runner up: 2007
- Ulster Minor FootballLeague:
  - Winner (1): 2007

== Notes ==
- A. The Championship is the premier inter-county competition, made up of the four provincial Championships (in Derry's case the Ulster Championship) which are knock-out and the All-Ireland Championship (see current format)
