= Lissan GAC =

Derry-based Gaelic games club

St Michael's GAC Lissan
- CLG Naomh Mhichil Lios Áine
- Founded: 1910
- County: Derry
- Colours: Red and Black
- Grounds: Tullynure
- Coordinates: 54°41′25.89″N 6°45′23.84″W

Playing kits
Standard colours

Saint Michael's GAC Lissan (Irish: CLG Naomh Mhichil Lios Áine) is a Gaelic Athletic Association located in the Catholic parish of Lissan, County Londonderry, Northern Ireland. It is a part of Derry GAA and currently caters for Gaelic football, Rounders and handball. St Michael's teams compete in Derry championships, although part of the parish is located in County Tyrone.

Lissan has won the Derry Junior Football Championship three times. Underage teams up to Under-12's play in South Derry league and championships, from Under-14 upwards teams compete in All-Derry competitions.

== Gaelic football ==
Lissan fields Gaelic football teams at U8, U10, U12, U14, U16, Minor and Senior levels. It currently competes in the Derry Intermediate Championship and Division 2 of the Derry ACFL.

== History ==
The club was first founded in 1910 as Ruairi Ógs, and matches were played on a pitch known as "The Waterside" in Tullynure. The club officially became St. Michael's in 1962 when it was affiliated to the South Derry Board. In 1977, the club laid a new playing field. Work on a new pavilion commenced in 1986 and was officially opened in August 1990 by GAA President-elect Peter Quinn.

St Michael's reached the Derry Junior Football Championship on seven occasions. In 1987, they were defeated by Dungiven Thirds, in 1990 by Foreglen, in 1997 by Eoghan Rua and 2006 by Drum. The club's Junior successes came in 1998 when they beat Seán Dolans, in 2007 when they beat Drum, and in 2008 when they beat Glack.

In September 2007, another new pavilion was unveiled in Lissan. Like 17 years beforehand it was officially opened by Peter Quinn. The main feature of the afternoon was a challenge match between Ballinderry and St Gall's.

=== Club crest ===
The crest designed by club secretary Michael McCrory with the artwork produced by local artist Mary Monaghan. Lios Aine means Aine's Fort; The crest shows the Irish goddess Áine her fort, Slieve Gallion, the Sperrin Mountains and Lough Fea. A Gaelic football and goalposts are also shown representing the games and activities of the club.

== Honours ==
- Derry Junior Football Championship (3): 1998, 2007, 2008
- South Derry Junior Football League (2): 1998, 2008
- Ulster Junior Club Football Championship (0): (Finalist in 2008)
