= John Deighan =

Derry Gaelic footballer

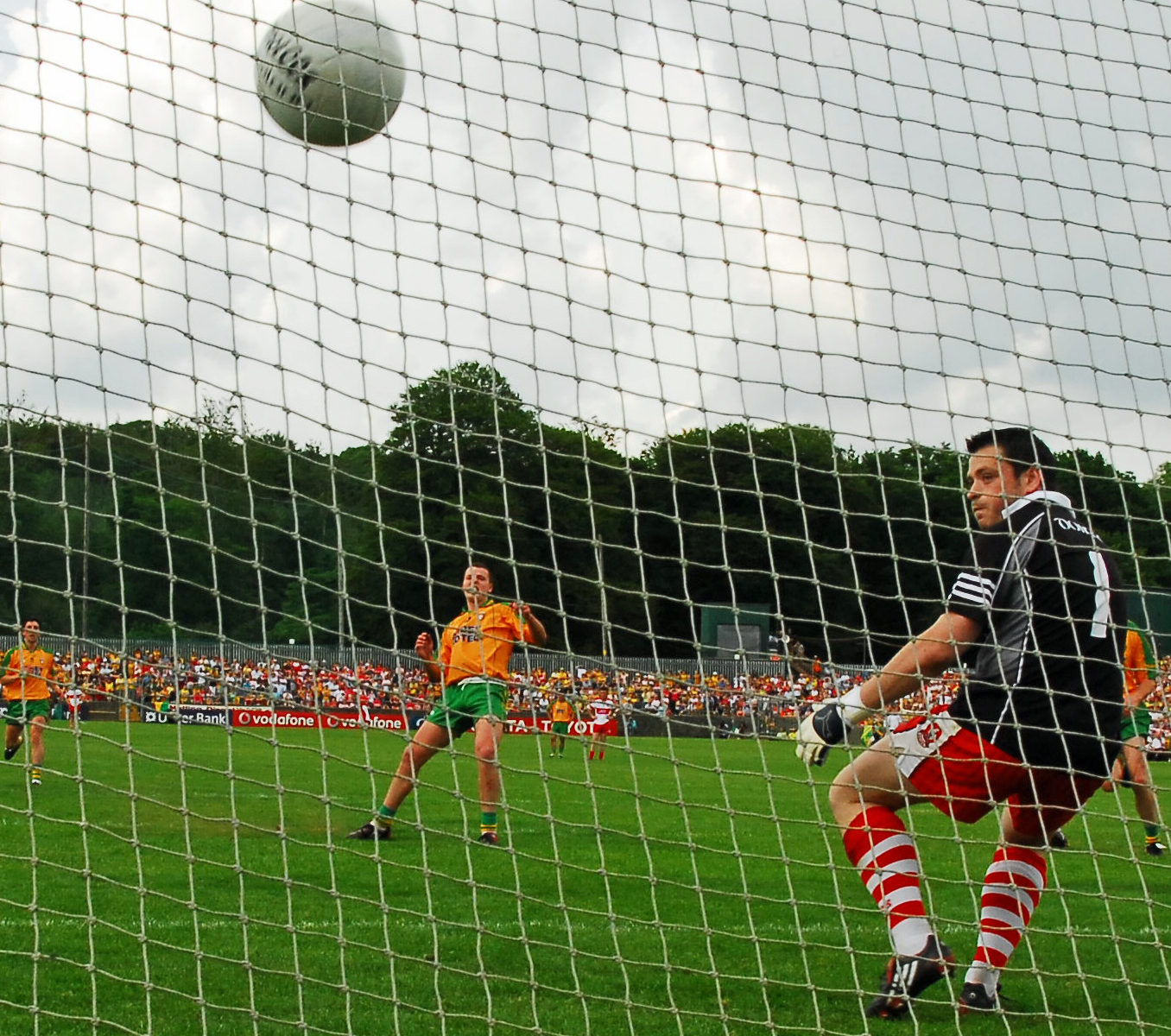

Personal information
- Nickname: Diggsy
- Born: 19 December 1982 (age 43) Limavady, County Londonderry, Northern Ireland
- Occupation: Chartered Accountant
- Height: 6 ft 0 in (183 cm)

Sport
- Sport: Gaelic football
- Position: Goalkeeper
Club
- Years: Club
- ?–present: Limavady
Inter-county*
Years	County	Apps (scores)
2008–present	Derry	2 (0–00)
Inter-county titles
- NFL: 1
- *Inter County team apps and scores correct as of 02:58, 18 January 2009 (UTC).

John Deighan (born 19 December 1982) is a Gaelic footballer who plays for the Derry county team, with whom he has won a National League title. He plays his club football for Limavady Wolfhounds GAC. He plays as goalkeeper for Derry.

== Playing career ==
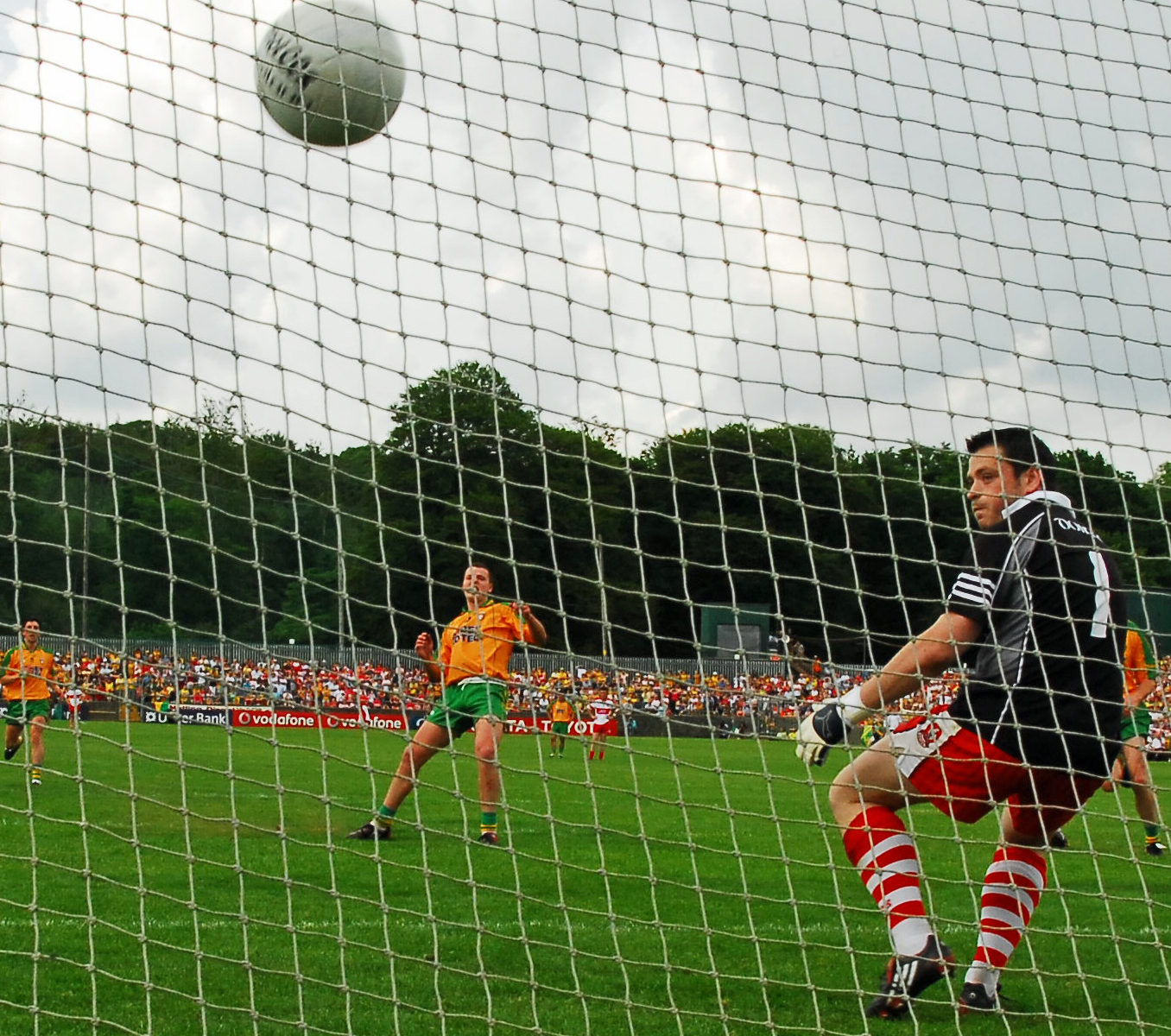
Donegal's Michael Murphy scores a penalty against Deighan in the 2008 Ulster Championship

=== Inter-county ===
Deighan was called up to the Derry Senior panel in 2008. He helped Derry reach the 2008 Dr McKenna Cup final, where they were defeated by Down. He was part of the Derry panel that won that year's National League where Derry beat Kerry in the final. The league success saw Derry become favourites to win the Ulster Championship and one of the top few for the All-Ireland. However, despite a good opening victory over Donegal, Derry exited the Ulster Championship against Fermanagh at the semi-final stage and were defeated by Monaghan in the first round of the Qualifiers. The Donegal match saw Deighan make his Championship debut. He missed the Fermanagh game through injury, but returned for the Monaghan match.

==== Championship matches' details ====
#	Date	Competition	Venue	Opponent	Result^{[A]}	Score	Match report
1	1 June 2008	Ulster SFC QF	MacCumhaill Park, Ballybofey	Donegal	1-14 : 1-12	0-00	RTÉ, BBC, Derry GAA
2	19 July 2008	Qualifiers Round 2	St Tiernach's Park, Clones	Monaghan	1-12 : 1-13	0-00	RTÉ, BBC, Derry GAA

- A. Result column lists Derry's score first
- Statistics accurate as of 17 January 2009

Limavady Wolfounds G.A.C.

== Honours ==
=== Inter-county ===
- National Football League:
  - Winner (1): 2008
- Dr McKenna Cup:
  - Runner up: 2008

Note: The above lists may be incomplete. Please add any other honours you know of.
