= Peter Stevenson =

Derry Gaelic footballer

Personal information
- Nickname: The Damper
- Born: County Londonderry, Northern Ireland
- Occupation: Teacher
- Height: 5 ft 10 in (178 cm)

Sport
- Sport: Gaelic football/Hurler
- Position: Half back / Corner back / Corner forward
Club
- Years: Club
- ?–?: Ballerin/Drum
Club titles
- Derry titles: 10 derry
- Ulster titles: 1 Ulster
Inter-county
- Years: County
- Derry
Inter-county titles
- Ulster titles: 3
- All Stars: 1

Peter Stevenson is a former Gaelic footballer who played for the Derry county team in the 1960s and 1970s. Described as a "tower of strength", he won the Ulster Senior Football Championships on three occasions. He was awarded an All Star in 1975. Stevenson played club football with a number of clubs throughout his career including St Colm's GAC Drum and Ballerin Sarsfields.

== Playing career ==
=== Inter-county career ===
Stevenson won Ulster Senior Championships with Derry including back-to-back successes in 1975 and 1976 when he was captain. He won an All Star for his performances in the 1975 championship. He was also captain of the 1977 side that lost to Armagh. Stevenson won two all-Ireland junior hurling championships in 1975 and 1982. the Ulster decider, lining out at left corner forward.

=== Club career ===
Stevenson played his club football with Ballerin. He won a county championship in 1976 and an Ulster club medal the same year with Ballerin but they lost the all-Ireland club final to Austin Stacks Tralee.

Stevenson also played for Kevin Lynch's Hurling Club|Dungiven. He won nine county hurling championships with Dungiven and played hurling for Ulster in 1976, on the same day that he played football for Ulster at Croke Park, marking Eddie Keher in hurling and Mickey O'Sullivan in the football.

He was part of St Columb's College 1965 MacRory Cup and Hogan Cup winning side.
