= Moneymore GAC =

Derry-based Gaelic games club

Henry Joy McCracken's GFC Moneymore
- Muine Mór
- Founded: 1911
- County: Derry
- Colours: Black and Amber
- Grounds: McCracken Park
- Coordinates: 54°41′25.50″N 6°39′34.15″W

Playing kits
McCracken's GFC	Ógra Mór

Henry Joy McCracken's GFC Moneymore (Irish: CLG Mhic Reachtáin, Muine Mór) is a Gaelic Athletic Association club based in Moneymore, County Londonderry, Northern Ireland. The club is a member of Derry GAA and currently caters for Gaelic football. The club is named after the 18th-century Irish republican leader Henry Joy McCracken.

Underage teams play in the South Derry league and championships. Moneymore have won the Derry Intermediate Football Championship once and the Derry Junior Football Championship twice.

== Gaelic football ==
Moneymore fields Gaelic football teams at Reserve and Senior levels. Underage teams (U8, U10, U12, U14, U16 and Minor) are amalgamated with Desetmartin GAC and form the Callan Gaels team. Sides up to U-12s play in South Derry league and championships, from U-14 upwards teams compete in All-Derry competitions.

== Ladies' Gaelic football ==
Moneymore ladies play together with An Lúb players in the Ardtrea team. The team also draws players from Ballinderry, Lissan, Ógra Colmcille and other South Derry clubs along the border with County Tyrone.

== History ==
There was a presence of Gaelic games in Moneymore in the early 1900s. O'Cahan Moneymore played in the Cookstown and District Football League in 1911. Moneymore won the South Derry Handball League in 1991 and 1912. The next records of O'Cahan's were in 1934 when they played in the South Derry League, but lasted only one season, before competing again in 1938 and 1939. The club played as Henry Joy McCracken's in 1945, before becoming defunct decades later.

McCracken's reformed in 1976 and chose to wear black and amber colours. The first President was Charlie Teague, an old O'Cahan's clubman. Managed by Brendan O'Neill and Patsy Breen, the club's first major success came in 1984 when they won the Derry Intermediate Football Championship, were runners up in 2001 senior Intermediate and in 2000 reserve intermediate championships. McCracken's won the 1995 and 2014 Derry Junior Football Championship and runners up in 1999, 2018 & 2023.

== Honours ==
=== Senior ===
- Derry Intermediate Football Championship: 1
  - 1984 runner-up 2001
- Derry Junior Football Championship: 2
  - 1995 2014 runner up 1999 2018 2023
- Derry Football League Division 3: 3
  - 1995 1999 2014
- Derry Senior Football League Division 1B: 1
  - 2001 topped league in 2002 but did not win league as play off system was used

=== Reserve ===
- Graham Cup 2
  - 1978 2014

=== Minor ===
- (Runners up) South Derry Minor B Championship
  - 1997
- Derry Minor B Championship
  - 2017 (Callan Gaels)
- Derry Minor B League
  - 1998, 2017 (Callan Gaels)
  - Derry U16 League & Championship
    - 2017.

=== Handball ===
- South Derry Handball League: 2
  - 1911, 1912

== See also ==
- Derry Intermediate Football Championship
- List of Gaelic games clubs in Derry
