= Derry Championship =

Derry Championship may refer to:

- Derry Senior Football Championship
- Derry Minor Football Championship
- Derry Senior Hurling Championship

== See also ==
- Derry club football competitions
- Derry club hurling competitions
- Derry GAA
