= Séamus Lagan =

Derry Gaelic footballer

Personal information
- Born: James Francis Lagan; 1947 Maghera, County Londonderry, Northern Ireland
- Died: 5 May 2018 (aged 71) Maghera, County Londonderry, Northern Ireland

Sport
- Sport: Gaelic football
- Position: Forward
Club
- Years: Club
- Glen
Club titles
- Derry titles: 0
Inter-county
- Years: County
- Derry
Inter-county titles
- Ulster titles: 3
- All-Irelands: 1
- NFL: 0
- All Stars: 0

James Francis Lagan (1947 – 5 May 2018), better known as Séamus Lagan, was a Gaelic footballer whose league and championship career at senior level with the Derry county team spanned two decades.

Born in Maghera, County Londonderry, Northern Ireland, Lagan played competitive Gaelic football with St Columb's College in Derry, and won a Hogan Cup medal in 1965. Lagan also had a lengthy club career with Glen.

Lagan made his debut on the inter-county scene when he was selected for the Derry minor team in 1965. He enjoyed one championship season with the minor team, culminating with the winning of an All-Ireland medal in 1965. Lagan subsequently joined the Derry under-21 team, winning an All-Ireland medal in 1968. By this stage he had also joined the Derry senior team. Over the course of the next decade, Lagan won Ulster SFC medals in 1970, 1975 and 1976.
