= CLG Doire Trasna =

Derry-based Gaelic games club

Derry Waterside Parish
- CLG Na Piarsaigh Doire Trasna
- County: Derry
- Nickname: Pearse's
- Colours: Green and Red
- Grounds: Pairc na Piarsaigh
- Coordinates: 54°59′04.80″N 7°18′08.23″W

Playing kits
Standard colours

Na Piarsaigh CLG Doire Trasna is a Gaelic Athletic Association club based in the Waterside area of Derry, County Londonderry, Northern Ireland. They play in the Derry GAA league and championships, and currently cater for Gaelic football.

Doire Trasna fields Gaelic football teams at U8, U10, U12, U14, U16, Minor, and Senior levels. Underage teams up to U-12's play in North Derry league and championships, from U-14 upwards teams compete in All-Derry competitions.

== See also ==
- Derry Intermediate Football Championship
- List of Gaelic games clubs in Derry
