= Drummullan =

Village in County Londonderry, Northern Ireland

Coordinates: 54°38′47″N 6°39′33″W

Drummullan: Irish: Druim Maoláin
- Location within Northern Ireland
- Population: 174
- District: Mid-Ulster
- County: County Londonderry
- Country: Northern Ireland
- Sovereign state: United Kingdom
- Post town: MAGHERAFELT
- Postcode district: BT45
- Dialling code: 028
- UK Parliament: Mid Ulster
- NI Assembly: Mid Ulster

Drummullan (from Irish Druim Maoláin meaning "ridge of the bare hill") is a small village and townland in County Londonderry, Northern Ireland. It is 1 1/2 miles (2.4 km) west of Coagh, 3 1/2 miles (5.6 km) east of Cookstown, 3 1/4 miles (5.2 km) south of Moneymore and 5 miles (8 km) north of Stewartstown in County Tyrone. Most of the village lies on the Moneymore to Stewartstown road, and is in the Mid-Ulster District.

== Sport ==
Drummullan is home to Derry GAA club CLG Ógra Colmcille.

== Notable people ==
Drummullan's most famous son is the "Irish Giant" Charles Byrne, who was born in Littlebridge in 1761. His 7'7" frame made him a celebrity in England, and his skeleton was put on display at London's Royal College of Surgeons after his death.
