= Sean O'Connell =

Derry Gaelic footballer and manager

Personal information
- Nickname: The Big Fellow
- Born: 1930s Garvagh, County Londonderry, Northern Ireland
- Died: July 2003
- Occupation: School teacher / principal

Sport
- Sport: Gaelic football
- Position: Full forward
Club
- Years: Club
- 1953–1978: Ballerin
Club titles
- Derry titles: 2
- Ulster titles: 1
Inter-county
Years	County	Apps (scores)
1957–?	Derry	?apps 11–118 (151)
Inter-county titles
- Ulster titles: 4
- All Stars: 1

Sean O'Connell (1930s – July 2003) was a Gaelic football manager and player who featured for the Derry county team in the late 1950s, 1960s and 1970s and was on the Derry side that finished runners-up to Dublin in the 1958 All-Ireland Championship – winning an Ulster Championship with the county that year, and three more in 1970, 1975 and 1976. For his performances in the 1967 All-Ireland Senior Football Championship, O'Connell won a Cú Chulainn Award (the awards which ran between 1963 and 1967 were the forerunner to the modern day All Star Awards).

O'Connell played his club football for Ballerin Sarsfields. He was instrumental in helping Ballerin reach the 1976–77 All-Ireland Senior Club Football Championship final, where they were defeated by Austin Stacks of Kerry. He also won two Derry Championships and an Ulster Senior Club Football Championship with the club.

He is regarded as a Derry legend, and an all-time great of the game. He was in particular known for scoring exploits – he is ninth in the all-time list of top Ulster scorers in Championship football with a tally of 11–118 (11 goals and 118 points—each goal equals 3 points; 11 × 3 + 118 = 151 points, see GAA scoring rules). In the centenary year of the Gaelic Athletic Association (1984), O'Connell was named in the Football Team of the Century comprising players who never won an All-Ireland. Former Derry County Board chairman Gerard O'Kane said of O'Connell "everyone growing up when Sean O'Connell was playing wanted to be Sean O'Connell".

== Background and early life ==
Sean O'Connell was born in Garvagh in the 1930s; his father Pat was a farmer and a talented soccer player. His mother Brigid (née McKenna), originally from Slaughtneil, was a school teacher. He had four brothers and four sisters. His elder brother Seamus was a priest and played with Derry in the 1950s. His other brothers Paddy and Gerard played at Under 21 level for Derry, while Cahir was a decent club player in the 1960s and early 1970s.

His cousin Seamus O'Connell played soccer for the likes of Chelsea F.C. in England where he helped the club win their first ever League title in 1954–55.

Sean boarded at St Columb's College in Derry. O'Connell tried his hand at boxing in his youth and was a member of Garvagh Boxing Club. He worked as a teacher and was principal of St Patrick's College in Dungiven for many years. He lived in Limavady for many years and he and his wife Margaret had four children. He died in July 2003 and is buried in Limavady.

== Playing career ==
=== Playing style ===
One of O'Connell main attributes was his amazing and consistent scoring tallies. He frequently scored double-figures in games for both Ballerin and Derry, and was top scorer in both the 1974 and 1975 All-Ireland Championships. He was particularly known for being able to evade his marker by his incredible use of the sidestep dummy. He was also an extremely reliable free-taker. His tally of 11 Championship goals is one of the highest ever in Ulster football history.

=== Inter-county ===
O'Connell along with some of his Ballerin club-mates represented Derry at Minor level, – breaking into the Minor in 1955 and made his Senior debut two years later.

In 1958 he played for Derry against Galway in the Wembley Tournament (a tournament played in Wembley Stadium, London, England, for Irish people in the city to watch). He scored the first ever Gaelic football point scored in the stadium, but Derry lost out to Galway. That year O'Connell as was part of Derry's first ever Ulster Senior Football Championship winning team, beating Down in the final by four points (1–11 to 2–04). On 24 August, Derry caused one of the biggest shocks in the history of Gaelic football when the first-time Ulster Champions beat Kerry in the All-Ireland semi-final 2-06 to 2–05 – O'Connell's "brilliant solo goal" proving decisive. They met Dublin in the All-Ireland final but Derry were defeated. It has been claimed a series of poor refereeing decisions in that game cost Derry greatly, but Derry captain Jim McKeever said in a 2002 interview that it should also be noted that "It was an exceptionally good Dublin team".

The 1950s was a decade of very high standards of football and was a very difficult era to win an All-Ireland, with the likes of Mayo, Galway, Kerry, Louth, Cavan, Meath and Dublin having very strong teams at the time. Unfortunately for Derry, they never quite managed to keep that team together, and only O'Connell from that starting 15 would ever win another Ulster title and play in another All-Ireland semi-final. They did however reach the National League final in both 1958/59 and 1960/61, but they lost out to Kerry on both occasions, partly due to O'Connell being suspended for both deciders – he was suspended because he played soccer, which was against GAA rules at the time (Rule 27).

O'Connell won a Cú Chulainn Award (forerunner to the All Star Awards) in 1967 and won further Ulster Championships in 1970, 1975 and 1976 – and was captain for the 1970 triumph. In addition to being top scorer in the 1971 Ulster Championship, he was top scorer in both the 1974 and 1975 All-Ireland Championships. O'Connell's goal in the 1975 All-Ireland semi-final against Dublin has been called one of the greatest ever scored in Croke Park. He was a replacement All Star in 1976. In the 1976 Ulster decider replay against Cavan, he came off the bench in extra-time and played a vital role in securing the title for Derry. He was 37 years old when he played in 1975–76 National League final against Dublin – Derry lost by a point in what has been described as the "greatest ever League final".

=== Club ===
O'Connell made his debut for the Ballerin Senior team in 1953. That year, as a fifteen-year-old year he played for Ballerin in both the Derry Minor and Derry Senior Championship finals – both on the same day in Magherafelt. Ballerin however, were defeated in both finals – by Bellaghy and Desertmartin respectively. In 1957 however, Ballerin won their first ever Derry Championship, beating Ballymaguigan in the final on a scoreline of 3–08 to 2–06. Playing for Ballymaguigan that day was fellow Derry footballing legend Jim McKeever. O'Connell, now a 19-year-old, scored four points in that decider.

Ballerin won their second ever Derry Championship in 1976, this time defeating Dungiven in the final by 0–09 to 0–03, with O'Connell playing a starring role. They went on to win that year's Ulster Senior Club Football Championship – defeating St. Joseph's (Donegal) in the quarter-final, Enniskillen Gaels (Fermanagh) in the semi-final and Clan na Gael of Armagh in the decider – O'Connell's performances once again proving vital to the club's success. The team easily beat Killererin of Galway in the 1976–77 All-Ireland Senior Club Football Championship semi-final, setting up a final clash with Austin Stacks of Kerry. The two teams were very closely matched the whole match, with Austin Stacks effectively winning the game in the last three minutes – the game finishing 1–13 to 2–07. Such was the esteem in which O'Connell was held that virtually all the Austin stacks players rushed to commiserate with him after the match. His role in bringing Ballerin to the All-Ireland final cannot be underestimated – with two seventeen-year-olds, an eighteen-year-old and a nineteen-year-old among the six forwards, his experience and ability were irreplaceable.

He retired from club football in 1978, bringing an end to an incredible playing career.

=== Province ===
O'Connell played for Ulster for many years and won five Railway Cup medals with the province (1965, 1966, 1968, 1970 and 1971). He was captain for the 1971 success.

=== School ===
While O'Connell was at St Columb's, the school didn't compete in open competitions, such as the MacRory Cup, therefore his football at the school was confined to house and class matches.

=== Other sports ===
O'Connell played some soccer with Irish League side Coleraine F.C., playing in the centre half position. Other smaller soccer clubs he lined out for included Park and Dungiven Celtic. He was an outspoken critic of the GAA's Rule 27 which prohibited its players from playing foreign sports, and received a ban for playing the sport. He was also a decent golfer and in his youth participated in boxing as well as basketball.

== Managerial career ==
O'Connell was manager when Derry Minors won the Ulster Minor and All-Ireland Minor Championships in 1965. He was also manager of the Derry Under 21 team who won Ulster Under 21 and All-Ireland Under 21 Championships three years later in 1968. Many were surprised that he was never given the job of Derry Senior manager. He also served five years as manager of Ballerin and was also Chairman of the club for five years.

== Honours ==
=== County ===
- All-Ireland Senior Football Championship:
  - Runner up: 1958
- National Football League:
  - Runner up: 1958–1959, 1960–1961, 1975–76
- Ulster Senior Football Championship:
  - Winner (4): 1958, 1970, 1975, 1976
  - Runner up: 1957, 1971
- Dr McKenna Cup:
  - Winner (5): Years?
- Dr Lagan Cup:
  - Winner (1): Year?

=== Club ===
- All-Ireland Senior Club Football Championship:
  - Runner up: 1976–77
- Ulster Senior Club Football Championship:
  - Winner (1): 1976
- Derry Senior Football Championship:
  - Winner (2): 1957, 1976
  - Runner up: 1953, 1964, 1965, 1972

=== Province ===
- Railway Cup – Winner (5): 1965, 1966, 1968, 1970, 1971

=== Individual ===
- All Star:
  - Winner (1): 1967
  - Replacement: 1976
  - Nominated (runner up): ??
- Derry Senior football captain: Ye
- Captain of Derry Ulster Championship winning team: 1970
- Captain of Ulster Railway Cup winning team: 1971
- Top scorer in All-Ireland Championship: 1974, 1975

=== Manager / coach ===
==== Derry Under 21s ====
- All-Ireland Under-21 Football Championship:
  - Winner (1): 1968
- Ulster Under-21 Football Championship:
  - Winner (1/2??): 1967??, 1968

==== Derry Minors ====
- All-Ireland Minor Football Championship:
  - Winner (1): 1965
- Ulster Minor Football Championship:
  - Winner (1): 1965

==== St Patrick's College, Dungiven ====
- Ulster title:
  - Winner (1): 1965
