= Una Harkin =

Northern Irish footballer (born 1983)

Personal information
- Full name: Una Matilda Harkin
- Date of birth: 2 January 1983 (age 43)
- Place of birth: Derry, Northern Ireland
- Position: Centre-back

Senior career*
Years	Team	Apps	(Gls)
2007	Keflavík	9	(2)

International career^{‡}
2006–	Northern Ireland		
- * Club domestic league appearances and goals ‡ National team caps and goals as of 14:05, 6 April 2012 (UTC)

Una Matilda Harkin (born 20 January 1983) is an Irish Gaelic and association football player. In Gaelic football, she is known for her time as a Derry player, reaching the 2008 All-Ireland Junior Ladies' Football Championship final with them, and in soccer for her career with Keflavík and Northern Ireland.

== Gaelic football ==
In August 2008 Harkin emigrated to Sharjah in the United Arab Emirates to take up a teaching position at Sharjah English School. She flew back the following month to play for Derry in their All-Ireland Junior Ladies' Football Championship final defeat to London at Croke Park. Harkin had played her club football with Doire Colmcille CLG.

Harkin had represented Ulster in inter–provincial competition during 2005. She won an Ulster All Star award.

== Association football ==
Harkin played club soccer with Institute, and in November 2006 was called into the Northern Ireland team for a UEFA Women's Euro 2009 pre–qualifier tournament in Turkey. Harkin's debut for the Irish team came against the host nation. In summer 2007 Harkin played semi–professional football in Iceland, scoring twice in a total of 12 games for Keflavík.

Harkin was unfortunate to score an own goal as Northern Ireland crashed 4–0 to England at Gillingham in March 2007. She was listed as a Drumahoe YMCA player, but also played some games for Crewe Alexandra Ladies in the English FA Women's Premier League Northern Division during 2006 – 07 and 2007–08.

In March 2008 Harkin overcame an ankle injury to play the return fixture against England at Mourneview Park, described as the biggest game of her career. National team coach Alfie Wylie said of Harkin: "Una has worked very hard and is fully committed to the cause. She is a powerful centre half who likes to go and win the ball and competes for everything; she is strong in the air and in the tackle and gives us a lot of strength in defence." An improved defensive display saw Ireland restrict their opponents to a 2–0 win.

When Harkin departed to Sharjah in 2008, she had been playing for the women's section of Linfield. She had already left by the time of their IFA Women's Challenge Cup final defeat to Glentoran Belfast United.
