= Limavady GAC =

Derry-based Gaelic games club

Limavady Wolfhounds GAC
- CLG Na Cúnna, Léim an Mhadaidh
- Founded: 1980
- County: Derry
- Nickname: The Wolfhounds
- Colours: Blue and Yellow
- Grounds: Páirc na gCúnna
- Coordinates: 55°03′00.59″N 6°56′10.50″W

Playing kits
Standard colours

Limavady Wolfhounds GAC (Irish: CLG Na Cúnna, Léim an Mhadaidh) is a Gaelic Athletic Association club based in Limavady, County Londonderry, Northern Ireland. The club is a member of Derry GAA and currently caters for Gaelic football.

The club fields teams from U6 up to Senior level. U14 teams and above play in their respective (County) Derry leagues and championships. Limavady have won the Derry Intermediate Football Championship once and the Derry Junior Football Championship four times.

== History ==
Wolfhounds GAC Limavady was officially established in 1980. However, there had a been a history of Gaelic games in the area before the founding of the current club. In 1903 St Patrick's Limavady hurling club was set up; its star player Henry Patton won an Ulster medal as part of the Derry team that defeated Antrim in the 1903 Ulster Senior Hurling Championship final.

Football was also played in Limavady, in the form of O'Connor's Limavady. They won the 1936 and 1941 Dr. Kerlin Cups beating Park (forerunner to the modern-day Banagher team) and Magilligan in the respective finals. The club also contested the Derry Senior Football Championship final in 1937??. Having won the 1938 North Derry Senior Football Championship, they were defeated by Lavey in the 1938 All-Derry Senior Championship semi-final. They reached the All-Derry final in 1941, but were defeated by Ballinascreen. In the late 1960s the St. Michaels GAC club was formed on the banks of the River Roe, from an amalgamation of players from the Limavady, Magilligan, and Glack areas, but later folded.

Success came relatively soon for the Wolfhounds club, when in 1985 five years after their formation they won the Derry Junior Football Championship, Derry Junior League and Neil Carlin Cup. After moving up to Intermediate grade, the club won the 1989 Derry Intermediate Football Championship. The club were relegated to Junior level again in the 1990s and won the Derry Junior Championship twice more, in 1999 and 2003. Following on from this success the club are currently trying to maintain their position amongst the Intermediate ranks.

In 2025 the club won the Derry Intermediate Football League, in the same season they made it to the semi-final of the Derry Intermediate Football Championship losing to Foreglen, as of 2026 they play in the Derry Senior Football League and Derry Intermediate Football Championship.

== Codes ==
=== Gaelic football ===
This club caters for both male and female Gaelic football.

=== Camogie ===
The Camogie club was re-established in 2004 after a long absence in the parish. There were U14, and Senior Camogie teams. The Senior Team played in the intermediate Derry League. The club no longer fields any Camogie teams.

=== Hurling ===
After a gap of decades, there have been efforts to re-establish hurling in the area. Limavady fielded an U10 team, athlough, the club no longer fields any hurling teams.

== Notable people ==
- John Deighan - former goalkeeper with Derry inter-county football team.
- Callum Brown - former Derry midfielder who later played Australian rules football for the GWS Giants in Sydney

== Football titles ==
=== Senior ===
- Derry Intermediate Football Championship: 1
  - 1989
- Derry Intermediate Football League: 2
  - 1989, 2025
- James O'Hagan Cup: 3
  - 2010, 2021, 2023
- Derry Junior Football Championship: 4
  - 1985, 1999, 2003, 2018
- Derry Junior Football League: 3
  - 1985, 2010, 2018
- Neil Carlin Cup: 5
  - 1985, 1999, 2004, 2010, 2018

=== Minor ===
- Minor 'B' Football Championship: 4
  - 1993, 1995, 2020, 2021
- Carlin/Duffy Cup: 1
  - 2010

== See also ==
- Derry Intermediate Football Championship
- List of Gaelic games clubs in Derry
