= Watty Graham's GAC, Glen =

Derry-based Gaelic games club

- CLG Watty Graham, An Ghleann
- Founded: 1948
- County: Derry
- Nickname: Wattys
- Colours: Green, Gold and White
- Grounds: Watty Graham Park, Maghera
- Coordinates: 54°50′23.44″N 6°41′17.98″W

Playing kits
Men's	Ladies'

Senior Club Championships
	All Ireland	Ulster champions	Derry champions
Football:	1	2	3
Ladies' football:	0	0	19

Watty Graham's Gaelic Athletic Club, Glen (Irish: An Ghleann), is a Gaelic Athletic Association (GAA) club based outside Maghera in the south of County Londonderry in Northern Ireland. Players are drawn from Maghera and some surrounding townlands. The club competes in Gaelic football, ladies' Gaelic football and camogie.

== Name ==
The club is named after Watty (Walter) Graham, who was a resident of Maghera in the 18th century. He was an educated Presbyterian who became an Elder of his church. Frustrated at the many restrictions on his liberty, he joined the United Irishmen. At the time of the 1798 rebellion he was captured and subsequently hanged in Maghera.

== Camogie ==
Glen fields Camogie teams at U12, U14, U16, Minor and Senior levels. The senior team competes in the Credit Union Derry Premier League.

== Ladies' football ==
Glen Ladies' football club was formed in 1995. The club has won the Derry Senior Ladies' Football Championship 19 times and the Ulster Intermediate championship three times.

== Watty Graham Park ==
The club's home ground is Watty Graham Park. It was opened in 1982 by then GAA President Paddy Buggy. The first game was an over-35s game, which was followed by an inter-county match between Derry and Armagh. Celtic Park in Derry City is officially recognised as Derry's main county ground, but Watty Graham Park has hosted a number of National League and Dr McKenna Cup games. Watty Graham Park currently has a capacity of six thousand.

== History ==
The Watty Graham club evolved from the Pearse's club formed around 1933, when Fr Anthony Doherty, amongst others, arranged a South Derry league. The club reached the 1944 South Derry final and a few of their players represented Derry.

After the folding of the Pearse's club, Watty Graham's GAC, Glen, was officially formed in 1948. In the early 1950s, it competed in a number of South Derry Finals and in 1953 they defeated St John's, Mullan (a townland of Ballinderry), to win the South Derry Junior Championship. They won the same title six years later defeating The Loup in the final. 1959 also saw their first all county success defeating Faughanvale in the final.

In 1964, they won the South Derry Junior and Derry Junior Football Championship by beating Littlebridge (part of the modern day Ógra Colmcille club) and Sarfield's respectively. The side repeated this feat in 1966 by beating The Loup in the South Derry Junior final before going on to win the Derry Junior final. The 1970s proved a barren decade for Watty Graham's and they have little apart from a McGlinchey Cup success in 1974 to show for it. Glen opened a new social club in Maghera in April 1976.

The club won its first Derry Intermediate Football Championship in 1980. They overcame Drumsurn in the final by 0–06 to 0–03. Glen won a second Intermediate Championship in 1983 defeating Drum in the final.

In 1985, Watty Graham's won the All-Ireland Óg Sport title. They competed in county, provincial and All Ireland phases to come out winners. Two years later they won the Derry Minor Football Championship with a success over Ballinascreen. The same year Glen won the Larkin Cup and also the Senior Division 1 League. The side added another Larkin Cup in 1995. Glen won their fourth and fifth Junior Championship in 2004 and 2005, the competitions this time won by the Glen Thirds team. This same Thirds team went on to win three in a row by winning the Thirds Championship in 2006.

After a prolonged period of dominance in underage football, Glen won a fourth successive Ulster Minor Championship on 1 January 2015.

In 2021, with Malachy O'Rourke as manager, Glen won a first Derry Senior Football Championship; in 2022, the club won the county championship again, and then added the Ulster Senior Club Football Championship after wins over Errigal Ciarán (Tyrone), Erin's Own, Cargin (Antrim), and Kilcoo (Down). In 2023 Glen won a third consecutive Derry Senior Football Championship, beating Magherafelt in the final.

On 21 January 2024, Glen won the All-Ireland Senior Club Football Championship for the first time after a 2-10 to 1-12 win against St Brigid's in the final at Croke Park.

== Notable players ==
- Ethan Doherty – two-time Ulster SFC-winning Derry inter-county footballer
- Conor Glass – All Star-winning, two-time Ulster SFC-winning Derry inter-county footballer
- Enda Gormley – two-time All Star-winning, 1993 All-Ireland SFC-winning Derry inter-county footballer (Gormley managed Glen to the club's first ever Ulster Minor Championship at St Paul's Belfast on 1 January 2012, defeating Armagh Harps.)
- Séamus Lagan – former Derry inter-county footballer who won All-Ireland MFC and All-Ireland U21FC titles, as well as the Hogan Cup with St Columb's College
- Damien McCusker – 1993 All-Ireland SFC-winning Derry inter-county football golakeeper
- Fergal McCusker – 1993 All-Ireland SFC-winning Derry inter-county footballer

== Managers ==
- Malachy O'Rourke – led Glen to the 2023–24 All-Ireland Senior Club Football Championship title

== Football titles ==
=== Senior ===
- All Ireland Senior Club Football Championship: 1
  - 2024
- Ulster Senior Club Football Championship: 2
  - 2022, 2023
- Derry Senior Football Championship: 3
  - 2021, 2022, 2023
- Derry Senior Football League: 2
  - 1987, 2021
- Derry Senior Reserve Football Trophy: 1
  - 2008
- Derry Intermediate Football Championship: 2
  - 1980, 1983
- Derry Intermediate Football League: 1
  - 2014
- Derry Junior Football Championship: 5
  - 1959, 1964, 1966, 2004 (won by Glen Thirds team), 2005 (won by Glen Thirds team)
- South Derry Junior Football Championship: 4
  - 1953, 1959, 1964, 1966
- Derry Thirds Football Championship: ?
  - 2006
- Larkin Cup 3
  - 1987, 1995, 2005
- McGlinchey Cup 1
  - 1974
- Derry Senior Football championship (division 1):21
  - 1924–31
  - 1945
  - 1951–55
  - 1979–84
  - 1988–92

=== Under 21 ===
- South Derry Under-21 Football Championship: 1
  - 2014
- Derry Under-21 Football Championship: 3
  - 2014, 2015, 2016
- Ulster Under-21 Football Championship: 3
  - 2014–15, 2015–16, 2016–17

=== Minor ===
- Derry Minor Football Championship: 5
  - 1987, 2011, 2012, 2013, 2014
- Ulster Minor Club Football Championship: 4
  - 2011, 2012, 2013, 2014
- Derry Minor Football League: 3
  - 2011, 2012, 2013

== Ladies' football titles ==
- Derry Football Championship: 19
  - 1996, 1997, 1999, 2000, 2001, 2002, 2003, 2004, 2005, 2006, 2007, 2008, 2009, 2010, 2012, 2013, 2014, 2015, 2016
- Derry Football League: ?
  - 1999, 2000, 2001
- Ulster Intermediate Football Championship: 3
  - 2003, 2007, 2013
- All Ireland Intermediate Sevens: 1
  - 2007
- Powerscreen Sevens: 1
  - 2000
- Antrim 7-a-side Shield: 1
  - 2002
