= Ballerin GAC =

Derry-based Gaelic games club

Ballerin Sarfields GAC
- Baile Iarainn Na Sairsealaigh CLG
- Founded: 1944
- County: Derry
- Colours: Red and white
- Grounds: Páirc Sheamróg
- Coordinates: 55°00′43.38″N 6°44′04.44″W

Playing kits
Standard colours

Senior Club Championships
| | All Ireland | Ulster champions | Derry champions |
|---|---|---|---|
| Football: | - | 1 | 2 |

Ballerin Sarfields GAC (Irish: Baile Iarainn Na Sairsealaigh CLG) is a Gaelic Athletic Association club based in Ballerin, Northern Ireland. They are a member of the Derry GAA and currently cater for Gaelic football, Ladies' Gaelic football and Camogie. The club have also had hurling teams in various stages in their history.

Ballerin fields Gaelic football teams at U8, U10, U12, U14, U16, Minor, Reserve and Senior levels. Underage teams up to U-12's play in North Derry league and championships, from U-14 upwards teams compete in All-Derry competitions. In addition to drawing players from Ballerin, the club's catchment area includes Ringsend, Garvagh, Aghadowey, Macosquin and parts of Limavady.

The club's biggest success came in 1976 when they won the Ulster Senior Club Football Championship. They have also won the Derry Senior Football Championship twice. In recent decades the football team has been less successful and currently compete in the Derry Intermediate Football Championship and Division 4 of the Derry ACFL.

== History ==
=== Gaelic football ===
Ballerin Sarsfields GAC was formed in 1944 under the guidance of Barney McNicholl, Paddy Deighan and Harry Mullan. In January 1945 the club leased the land for a pitch, Shamrock Park Irish: Páirc Sheamróg) remains their pitch to this day. The club played their first ever match on 25 March 1945 in Faughanvale. The club's first home match was played a month later. Inside a few years, the club became a major force in Derry football and won the 1947 Derry Minor Championship. The club's first ever Derry Senior Football Championship came in 1957 when they defeated Ballymaguigan in the final. The club won a second Derry Senior Championship in 1976, this time at the expense of Dungiven and went on to win that year's Ulster Senior Club Football Championship, defeating Clan na Gael of Armagh in the final. Sarfields went on to reach the 1977 All-Ireland Senior Club Football Championship final, but were defeated by Austin Stacks of Kerry.

Derry reached the 1958 All-Ireland Senior Football Championship final. Brian Mullan, Sean O’Connell and Brendan Murray all of Ballerin played in that match. The club started work on redeveloping the pitch and adjoining hall in 1969 and was officially opened in August 1970. Between 1965 and 1975, the senior team played in eleven successive Dr. Kerlin Cup finals winning eight.

Ballerin won the 2002 Derry Junior Football Championship before being beat in that year's Ulster Junior Club Football Championship. The club were awarded North Derry Club of the Year award in 2002.

=== Camogie ===
An interest was shown in Ballerin for Camogie, so in 1944 a team was set up. The club only lasted four years before folding. After another short stint in the 1950s, the club permanently reformed in 1971. The club won the Derry Intermediate Camogie Championship in 1989. They also won the Intermediate League that year and again in 2006. Three Ballerin players have been awarded Ulster Colleges All Star Awards.

== Grounds ==
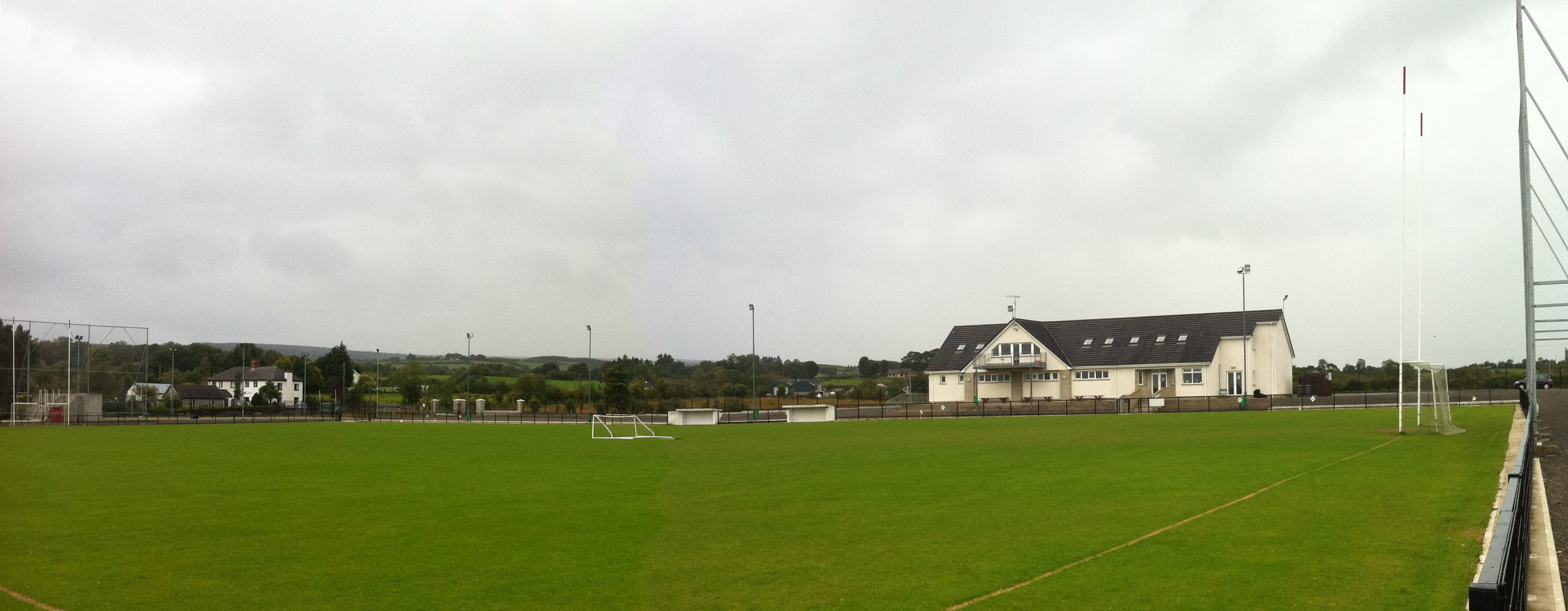
Club house and main pitch

Shamrock Park is the club's pitch and has been since it was leased in 1945.

A second floodlit pitch, costing £500,000 was officially opened on Saturday 30 July 2011.

== Notable players ==
- Sean O'Connell – Former Derry footballer. Twice finished highest scorer in the All-Ireland Senior Football Championship. Winner of four Ulster Championship medals with Derry and five Railway Cup medals with Ulster. Won a Cú Chulainn award in 1967.
- Peter Stevenson – All Star winning Derry footballer.

== Honours ==
=== Gaelic football ===
==== Senior ====
- Ulster Senior Club Football Championship: 1
  - 1976
- Derry Senior Football Championship: 2
  - 1957, 1976
- Derry Junior Football Championship: 1
  - 2002
- Dr Kerlin Cup 10
  - 1952, 1960, 1966, 1967, 1968, 1969, 1971, 1972, 1973, 1974

==== Minor ====
- Derry Minor Football Championship: 4
  - 1947, 1965, 1974, 1976

=== Camogie ===
==== Senior ====
- Derry Intermediate Camogie Championship: 1
  - 1989
- Derry Intermediate Camogie League: 2
  - 1989, 2006
- Ulster Gael Linn Representatives: 3
  - 2004, 2005, 2006
- Na Magha Cup: 2
  - 2005, 2006

==== Minor ====
- Derry Minor Camogie Championship: 1
  - 1982

== See also ==
- Derry Intermediate Football Championship
- List of Gaelic games clubs in Derry
