= Gortnahey =

Hamlet in County Londonderry, Northern Ireland

Coordinates: 54°57′20″N 6°58′07″W

Gortnahey: Irish: Gort na hÁithe
- Hamlet and Townland
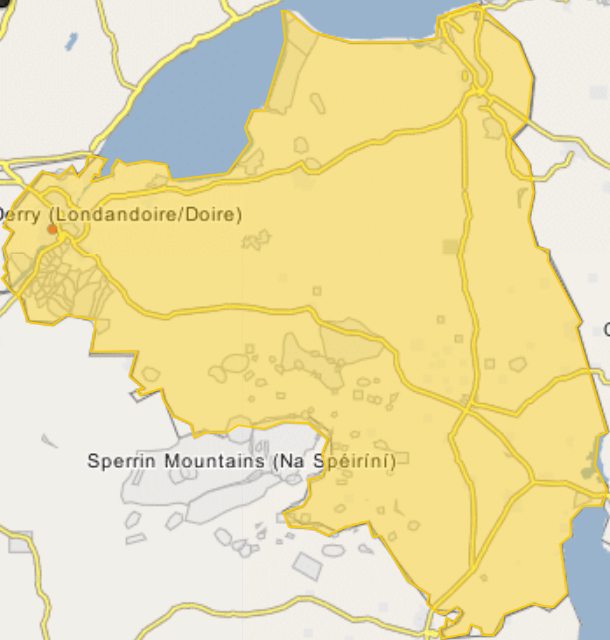
- Location within Northern Ireland
- District: Causeway Coast and Glens
- County: County Londonderry
- Country: Northern Ireland
- Sovereign state: United Kingdom
- Post town: LONDONDERRY
- Postcode district: BT47
- Police: Northern Ireland
- Fire: Northern Ireland
- Ambulance: Northern Ireland
- UK Parliament: East Londonderry
- NI Assembly: East Londonderry

Gortnahey (from Irish Gort na hÁithe 'enclosed field of the kiln'), also transliterated as Gortnaghey, is a townland and small hamlet in County Londonderry, Northern Ireland. It is made up of two smaller townlands, Gortnahey Beg (Irish: Gort na hÁithe Beag) and Gortnahey More (Irish: Gort na hÁithe Mór).

It is 5 km northwest of Dungiven and 13 km south of Limavady. In the 2001 Census its population was 285. It is situated within Causeway Coast and Glens district.

== Features ==
Altahullion Hill lies west of the hamlet, and there are extensive views to the east over the River Roe to Benbradagh. Gortnahey has grown as two clusters of housing, with an area of mainly public housing at Gortnahey Road and private housing at Beech Road. There is a primary school and Roman Catholic church, but there are no commercial services. There are proposals to provide a community hall and two retail units on the site of the existing McCartney Memorial Hall.
