= Rule 27 =

Former Gaelic sports rule

Rule 27 of the Gaelic Athletic Association (GAA), also known as "the Ban", was a rule in force from 1905 to 1971 that banned members of the GAA from playing or watching other sports such as rugby, soccer or hockey.

== The rule ==
The text of Rule 27 originally read:

Any member of the Association who plays or encourages in any way rugby, football, hockey or any imported game which is calculated to injuriously affect our National Pastimes, is suspended from the Association.

While potentially applying to any non-Irish sport, in practice the rule was mostly applied to English sports: rugby, football (soccer) and hockey were named initially, with cricket being added shortly afterward. GAA members were prohibited from playing, watching or attending any event associated with these sports. In some areas, "vigilance committees" were sent to football and rugby matches to check for any GAA members: any member who was found watching or playing could be expelled from the GAA.

=== Douglas Hyde ===
On 13 November 1938 Douglas Hyde, then President of Ireland and a patron of the GAA, attended an association football match at Dalymount Park between Ireland and Poland with the Taoiseach, Éamon de Valera.

As a result, he was removed from his patronage and banned from the GAA, despite Hyde's being a founder of the Gaelic League and staunch supporter of the GAA. The GAA did not accept the principle that the President should be allowed to attend any sporting event until 1945.

== Abolition ==
During the late 1960s, Rule 27 had become not only increasingly outdated, since football and rugby had come to be increasingly popular in Ireland, but also unenforceable, as GAA members had been able to watch these sports on television for some years. Even at an administrative level it was selectively enforced: while Antrim GAA authorities prevented the 1970 MacRory Cup final featuring Martin O'Neill, who had already gained renown in soccer, from going ahead at Casement Park, administrators in Tyrone allowed O'Neill to play after the game was moved. It was finally abolished at the GAA's annual congress in Belfast in 1971.

== See also ==
- Paddy Andrews
- Jimmy Cooney (Tipperary hurler)
- Gerry Culliton
- Frank Lynch
- Leonard McGrath
- Con Martin
- Paddy Neville
- Sean O'Connell
- Kevin O'Flanagan
- Con Roche
- Joe Stynes

== Bibliography ==
- The GAA v Douglas Hyde: The Removal of Ireland’s First President as GAA Patron, Cormac Moore, The Collins Press
