= Glack GAC =

Derry-based Gaelic games club

O'Connor's GAC Glack
- CLG Ó Conchobhair, An Glaic
- Founded: 1921
- County: Derry
- Colours: Maroon and Blue
- Grounds: Brolly Park (Páirc Ó Bhrolaigh)
- Coordinates: 55°01′23.87″N 7°01′50.31″W

Playing kits
Football	Camogie

O'Connor's GAC Glack (Irish: CLG Uí Chonchúir, An Glaic) is a Gaelic Athletic Association club based in the Glack/Ballykelly area in County Londonderry, Northern Ireland. The club is a member of Derry GAA and currently caters for Gaelic football and Camogie.

Underage teams up to U-12's play in North Derry league and championships, from U-14 upwards teams compete in All-Derry competitions. Glack have won the Derry Intermediate Football Championship once and the Derry Junior Football Championship three times.

== Gaelic football ==
Glack fields Gaelic football teams at Under-8, Under-10, Under-12, Under-14, Under-16, Minor, Reserve and Senior levels. The Senior team competes in the Derry Junior Football Championship and Division 2 of the Derry ACFL.

== Camogie ==
The camogie club is called St Finlough’s Camogie Club Glack (Irish: Chlub an Camógaíocht Naomh Fionnloch Glaic) and fields teams at various age-groups. Notably, Glack is the home club of Junior All-Ireland crowned camogie player and captain Brigid Carmichael (née McLaughlin)

== History ==
The club was founded in 1921. One of the club's major honours came in 1971 when it won the Derry Minor Football Championship. They won the Derry Junior Football Championship a year later before winning the Derry Intermediate Football Championship in 1974. After dropping back down to Junior grade, Glack won the Derry Junior Championship for a second time in 1981. In 2019 the club won their third Derry Junior Championship defeating Drum to end a 39 year wait for a County Championship.

== Honours ==
=== Senior ===
- Derry Intermediate Football Championship: 1
  - 1974
- Derry Junior Football Championship: 3
  - 1972, 1981, 2019
- H&A Mechanical Services Division 3: 1
  - 2012
- Neal Carlin Cup: 3
  - 2014, 2016, 2019

=== Minor ===
- Derry Minor Football Championship: 1
  - 1971

== See also ==
- Derry Intermediate Football Championship
- List of Gaelic games clubs in Derry
