= Ballerin =

Village in County Londonderry, Northern Ireland

Coordinates: 55.019808°N 6.738°W

Ballerin: Irish: Baile Uí Shírín / Baile Iarainn
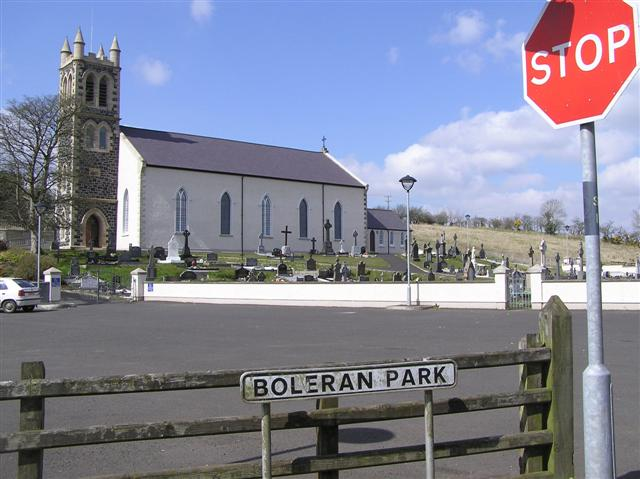
- Ballerin Catholic church

- Location within Northern Ireland
  - Belfast: 54 mi (87 km)
- District: Causeway Coast and Glens
- County: County Londonderry
- Country: Northern Ireland
- Sovereign state: United Kingdom
- Post town: COLERAINE
- Postcode district: BT51
- Dialling code: 028, +44 28

Ballerin is a small village between Garvagh and Ringsend in County Londonderry, Northern Ireland. It is located within Causeway Coast and Glens district. It includes Saint Columba's Catholic primary school and Saint Mary's Catholic church.

== Name ==
The village lies within a townland that has a similar name. The village's name is usually spelt Ballerin, while the townland's name is usually spelt Boleran. Earlier spellings of these names include Ballyerin (1654) and Ballyirin (1613). All are believed to come from Irish Baile Uí Shírín 'Ó Shírín's townland/settlement'. However, the local Gaelic Athletic Association club uses the Irish name Baile Iarainn, meaning "townland/settlement of iron".

== Parish ==
Ballerin is in Errigal civil parish and St Mary's is in the Derry Diocese, covering about half the Catholic parish of Garvagh.

== Sport ==
Ballerin is the focal point for a number of sports in the area including Errigal Boxing Club, Irish Dancing, indoor bowling, Camogie and Gaelic games.

- Ballerin GAC
