= Seán Dolans GAC =

Derry-based Gaelic games club

Seán Dolan's GAC
- CLG Seán Ó Dubhláin
- Founded: 1942
- County: Derry
- Nickname: Dolan's
- Colours: Red and White
- Grounds: Piggery Ridge, Creggan
- Coordinates: 54°59′38.83″N 7°21′10.01″W

Playing kits
Football

Seán Dolan's GAC (Irish: CLG Seán Ó Dubhláin) is a Gaelic Athletic Association club based in Derry, County Londonderry, Northern Ireland. The club is a member of the Derry GAA and fields both Gaelic football and Ladies' Gaelic football teams.

Underage teams up to Under-12's play in North Derry league and championships, from Under-14 upwards teams compete in All-Derry competitions.

== History ==
The club are named after IRA member Séan Dolan (Irish: Seán Ó Dubhláin). He was active in the IRA during the Northern Campaign. A fluent Irish speaker, Dolan was interned and imprisoned on a number of occasions for his activities in support of a United Ireland. While holding the position of secretary of the Derry City Board, Dolan was involved in the establishment of the Pearse's GAA club on the Waterside and played for them on a number of occasions. Seán Dolan died in the Waterside Hospital on 25 October 1941 at the age of 28. Seán Dolan's GAC was set up the following year in his honour.

In 2000, the club became the first Junior club to be awarded All-Ireland Club of the Year. In 2002, Séan Dolans GAC also won Derry Club of the Year.

The club's new premises was officially opened on 5 July 2023.

== Gaelic football ==
Seán Dolans fields Gaelic football teams at Under 8, Under 10, Under 12, Under 14, Under 16, Minor and Senior levels. As of 2022, they were competing in the Derry Junior Football Championship and the Junior All-County Football League.

The club also field Ladies' Gaelic football teams at a number of under-age levels.

== Honours ==
- Neil Carlin Cup (5): 1987, 2006, 2009, 2012, 2021
- Derry Junior Football League (1): 2009
- Derry Junior Football Championship (1): 2009

== See also ==
- List of Gaelic games clubs in Derry
