= Derry Minor Football Championship =

- Current season or competition: 2025 Derry Minor Football Championship
- Irish: Craobh mionaoiseach Peile Dhoire
- Founded: 1946
- Title holders: Dungiven (10th Title)
- Most titles: Bellaghy and Dungiven (10 titles)

The Derry Minor Football Championship is an annual gaelic football competition between the top Derry GAA clubs. The winners qualify to represent Derry in the Ulster Minor Club Football Championship.

Bellaghy and Dungiven have won the competition more than any other club with 10 titles. Glen are the only club to win 4 consecutive titles. Bellaghy, Ballinascreen, Ballinderry and Slaughtneil all won 3 county titles in a row.

Dungiven are the current champions, winning their 10th title beating The Loup

2-11 to 0-05.

== Wins Listed By Club ==
	Team	Wins	Winning years
1	Bellaghy	10	1953, 1954, 1955, 1957, 1961, 1963, 1973, 1991, 1994, 2018
1	Dungiven	10	1956, 1979, 1980, 1985, 1986, 1990, 2006, 2009, 2022, 2025
3	Ballinascreen	9	1958, 1960, 1964, 1966, 1967, 1968, 1978, 2005, 2017
4	Ballinderry	7	1989, 1996, 1997, 2001, 2002, 2003, 2008
4	Magherafelt	7	1959, 1972, 1992, 2010, 2021, 2023, 2024
6	Glen	5	1987, 2011, 2012, 2013, 2014
6	Lavey	5	1975, 1983, 1984, 2019, 2020
8	Kilrea	4	1970, 2004, 2007, 2016
8	Slaughtneil	4	1998, 1999, 2000, 2015
8	Ballerin	4	1947, 1965, 1974, 1977
11	Glenullin	3	1962, 1981, 1982
11	Banagher	3	1952, 1969, 1976
13	An Lub	2	1993, 1995
13	Eire Óg	2	1948, 1951
15	Swatragh	1	1988
15	Glack	1	1971
15	Sarsfields	1	1946

Notes:

- 1946 Sarsfields are now defunct. They were a Derry City club, a fore-runner to the modern-day Doire Colmcille club.
- 1948,1951 - Éire Óg club are now defunct.

== Finals Listed By Year ==
Year	Winner	Score	Runners-up	Score	Venue
2025	Dungiven	1-22	Loup	2-17	Bellaghy
2024	Magherafelt	2-11	Dungiven	0-05	Owenbeg
2023	Magherafelt	2-05	Lavey	1-06	Owenbeg
2022	Dungiven	1-11	Magherafelt	0-11	Glen
2021	Magherafelt	0-15	Lavey	1-09	Loup
2020	Lavey	1-15	Magherafelt	1-09	Bellaghy
2019	Lavey	0-15	Glen	1-08	Celtic Park
2018	Bellaghy	1-14	Lavey	2-09	Owenbeg
2017	Ballinascreen	0-11	Bellaghy	0-09	Celtic Park
2016	Kilrea	2-11	Dungiven	0-10	Owenbeg
2015	Slaughtneil	2-16	Glen	2-07	Owenbeg
2014	Glen	7-14	Magherafelt	3-09	Celtic Park
2013	Glen	2-14	Slaughtneil	2-11	Owenbeg
2012	Glen	0-09	Slaughtneil	0-08	Ballinderry
2011	Glen	1-12	Magherafelt	0-06	Slaughtneil
2010	Magherafelt	3-08	Ballinderry	1-07	Celtic Park
2009	Dungiven		Kilrea		Celtic Park
2008	Ballinderry				
2007	Kilrea	1-13	Slaughtneil	1-09	Celtic Park
2006	Dungiven	1-11	Steelstown	1-06	Celtic Park
2005	Ballinascreen	0-11	Bellaghy	1-07	Lavey
2004	Kilrea	W/0	Ballinderry		Final not played
2003	Ballinderry		Banagher		
2002	Ballinderry				
2001	Ballinderry		Glen		
2000	Slaughtneil		Bellaghy		
1999	Slaughtneil		Glen		
1998	Slaughtneil		Glen		
1997	Ballinderry		Glenullin		
1996	Ballinderry				
1995	Loup				
1994	Bellaghy		Ballinderry		
1993	Loup				
1992	Magherafelt		Dungiven		
1991	Bellaghy				
1990	Dungiven				
1989	Ballinderry	0-12	Bellaghy	0-10	Magherafelt
1988	Swatragh	2-05	Ballinderry	1-05	Dungiven
1987	Glen		Ballinascreen		
1986	Dungiven				
1985	Dungiven				
1984	Lavey				
1983	Lavey				
1982	Glenullin				
1981	Glenullin				
1980	Dungiven	1-07	Magherafelt	0-05	Newbridge
1979	Dungiven	1-06	Bellaghy	0-07	
1978	Ballinascreen				
1977	Ballerin				
1976	Banagher				
1975	Lavey				
1974	Ballerin				
1973	Bellaghy				
1972	Magherafelt				
1971	Glack				
1970	Kilrea				
1969	Banagher				
1968	Ballinascreen				
1967	Ballinascreen				
1966	Ballinascreen				
1965	Ballerin				
1964	Ballinascreen				
1963	Bellaghy				
1962	Glenullin				
1961	Bellaghy				
1960	Ballinascreen				
1959	Magherafelt				
1958	Ballinascreen				
1957	Bellaghy				
1956	Dungiven				
1955	Bellaghy				
1954	Bellaghy				
1953	Bellaghy				
1952	Banagher				
1951	Eire Óg				
1950					
1949					
1948	Eire Óg				
1947	Ballerin				
1946	Sarsfields				

== See also ==
- Derry GAA club football competitions
