= Doire Colmcille CLG =

Derry-based Gaelic games club

- Doire Colm Cille
- Founded: 1968
- County: Derry
- Colours: Amber and black
- Grounds: Páirc Colmcille
- Coordinates: 55°00′32.26″N 7°20′17.33″W

Playing kits
Standard colours

Doire Colmcille CLG is a Gaelic Athletic Association club based in Derry, Northern Ireland. The club is a member of Derry GAA and currently caters for Gaelic football and Ladies' Gaelic football.

Doire Colmcille have won the Derry Junior Football Championship title once. Underage teams up to U-12's play in North Derry North Derry league and championships, from U-14 upwards teams compete in All-Derry competitions.

== History ==
Doire Colmcille CLG was established in 1969 following the amalgamation of 3 city clubs – Daire Óg, Éire Óg and Sarsfields. Doire Colmcille was born out of humble beginnings, with only representation being a Men's Senior Football team.

The club won the Derry Junior Football Championship in 1974 and is the only Derry City side to have played in Intermediate ranks for the majority of its existence. Over the past 35 years Doire Colmcille CLG has continuously grown to serve the local Gaelic community, and now is represented by no fewer than 10 individual footballing teams spanning both men's and ladies from U-12 right through to senior. Doire Colmcille CLG is governed by an elected executive committee comprising 11 officers from chairman right through to ladies and men's playing representatives. All officers are elected by full members at the club's annual general meeting.

== Gaelic football ==
Doire Colmcille fields Gaelic football teams at U8, U10, U12, U14, U16, Minor and Senior levels. They currently compete in the Derry Junior Championship and Division 2 (tier 3) of the Derry ACFL.

== Ladies' Gaelic football ==
The club also has had a number of Ladies' Gaelic football sides. Starting from Under 16s to Ladies Senior teams. In 2008, three of Doire Colmcille senior ladies represented Derry in the All-Ireland Junior football final against London at Croke Park.

After having problems with numbers, there is now a ladies and underage girls teams.

== Honours ==
- Derry Junior Football Championship (1): 1974
- North Derry Minor 'A' Football League (1): 1997
- North Derry Minor 'B' Football League (1): 1996

== Notable players ==
- Shane Duffy – played with Doire Colmcille in his youth before signing a professional contract with Everton.
- Phil Friel – Played for Doire Colmcille's forerunners Sarsfields and played on Derry's 1965 All-Ireland Minor Football Championship winning team.
- Una Harkin – played with Doire Colmcille in her youth and also played soccer for Northern Ireland.

== See also ==
- List of Gaelic games clubs in Derry
