= Kilrea GAC =

Derry-based Gaelic games club

Pádraig Pearse's GAC Kilrea
- Cumann Padraig Mhic Pharais, Cill Ria
- Founded: 1956
- County: Derry
- Nickname: The Pearses
- Colours: Red and white
- Grounds: Pearse Park, Gortmacrane
- Coordinates: 54°55′45.43″N 6°34′47.12″W

Playing kits
Football	Camogie

Pádraig Pearse's GAC Kilrea (Irish: CLG Pádraig Mhic Piarais Cill Ria) is a Gaelic Athletic Association club based in Kilrea, County Londonderry, Northern Ireland. The club is a member of the Derry GAA and currently caters for both Gaelic football and camogie. The club is named after Irish patriot Pádraig Pearse.

Underage teams up to U-12s play in South Derry league and championships, from U-14 upwards teams compete in All-Derry competitions.

== Crest ==
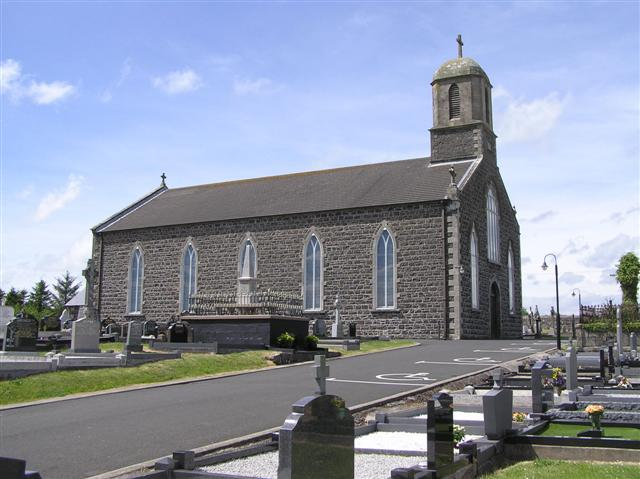
Drumgarner's Catholic church features on the club crest

The club crest resembles the head of a Celtic cross, featuring images of oak leaves (symbol of Derry), a footballer, the Flag of Ulster, crossed camogie sticks and a sliotar, and at the centre is the Catholic church of St Mary, Drumgarner, which is directly north of the club's grounds.

== History ==
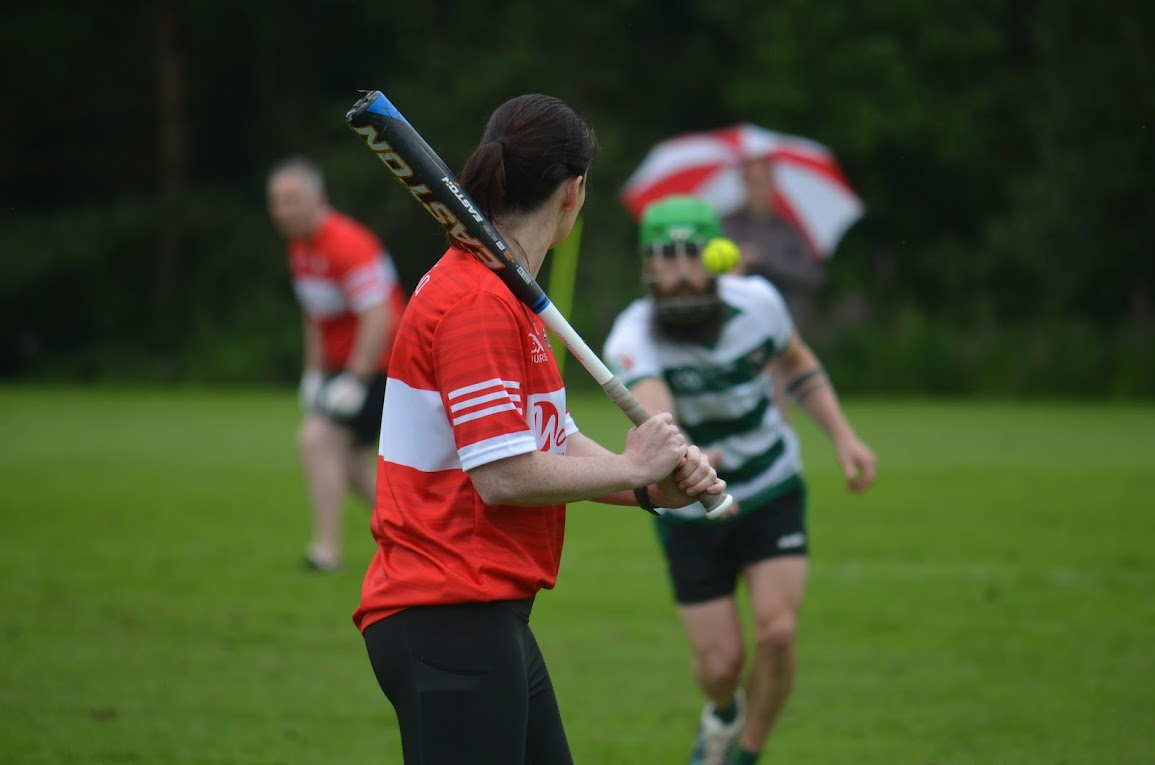
A Wolfe Tones player pitches to a Kilrea player (red and white) in a rounders game, 2024.

The first Kilrea Gaelic football club was established on 15 November 1943. The club was named O'Cahan's Kilrea and played in blue and gold jerseys. Many of the inaugural Minor team of 1946 went on to help Kilrea win the Junior Championship in 1951. In the early 1950s the club changed its name to the Kevin Barry's, named after the patriot Kevin Barry and played in black and amber colours. Its nickname was "the B's".

Soon after, in 1956, the current club, Pádraig Pearse's GAC Kilrea, was formed, and chose to play in red and white jerseys. The club won Junior League and South Derry Championships before moving to compete in Senior football in 1958.

In 1966 the Pearses won the inaugural Under 16 Championship. Part of that team was Martin O'Neill, who would later go onto play professional soccer and manage Glasgow Celtic and Aston Villa. Members of this team went on to win the County Minor title in 1970. The club won the 1971 Derry Junior Football Championship and won the Derry Intermediate Championship four years later.

== Pearse Park ==
Work was commenced on Pearse Park in late 1977 and opened two years later. A second training pitch which was completed in 2001. A new club pavilion opened, with a dedicated club gym and four changing rooms, along with an upstairs function room, in 2004. Pearse Park has remained at the same site on the Drumagarner Road since the club was founded. The grounds are located in the townlands of Moneysallin ('heath of willows') and Gortmacrane ('stony field').

== Honours ==
=== Senior ===
- Derry Intermediate Football Championship: 1
  - 1975
- Division 1 Senior Football League:1
  - 1981, 2024
- Derry Junior Football Championship: 1
  - 1971
- Derry Senior Reserve Football Championship: 1
  - 2013

=== Under-21 ===
- Derry Under-21 Football Championship:1
  - 2010

=== Minor ===
- Ulster Minor Club Football Championship: 1
  - 2008
- Derry Minor Football Championship: 4
  - 1970, 2004, 2007, 2016
- Derry Minor Football League: 2
  - 2006, 2007, 2016
- South Derry Minor Football Championship: 2
  - 1970, 1990
- South Derry Minor Football League: 2
  - 1970, 1990

=== Camogie ===
- Senior Derry Intermediate Camogie Championship: 2
  - 2008,2010,2024

== Notable players ==
- James Kielt

== See also ==
- Derry Senior Football Championship
- List of Gaelic games clubs in Derry
