= Derry Junior Football Championship =

- Current season or competition: Derry Senior Football Championship 2026
- Irish: Craobh Soísear Peile Dhoire
- Founded: 1950
- Title holders: Slaughtmanus (1st title)
- First winner: Desertmartin
- Most titles: Drum (7 titles)
- Sponsors: Premier Electrics

The Derry Junior Football Championship (known for sponsorship reasons as the Premier Electrics Derry Junior Football Championship) is an annual Gaelic football competition contested by lower-tier Derry clubs.

The competition receives coverage in the national media.

Slaughtmanus are the title holders (2025) defeating Doire Trasna Na Piarsaigh in the Final.

== History ==
It was once (around 2011) The Derry Credit Union Derry Junior Football Championship for sponsorship reasons but no more. It had, by 2015 at the latest, become the Premier Electrics Derry Junior Football Championship.

The final has been played at Celtic Park and at Owenbeg.

== Honours ==
The trophy presented to the winners is the Joe Brolly Cup. The winners of the Derry Junior Football Championship qualify to represent their county in the Ulster Junior Club Football Championship. They often do well there, with the likes of Craigbane (2024), Limavady (2018), Faughanvale (2015), Lissan (2008), Limavady (2003) and Ballerin (2002) among the clubs from Derry to play in at least one Ulster Championship final after winning the Derry Junior Football Championship. However, so far no team from Derry has won the Ulster Junior Championship and moved on to play in the All-Ireland Junior Club Football Championship.

== List of finals ==
Year	Winner	Score	Opponent	Score
1950	Desertmartin		Eoghan Rua	
1951	Ballymaguigan			
1952	Banagher			
1953	Greenlough			
1954	Ballinascreen			
1955	Swatragh			
1956	Slaughtneil			
1957	Sarsfields			
1958	Castledawson		An Lúb	
1959	Glen	2-09	Faughanvale	1-07
1960	Magherafelt		An Lúb	
1961	Swatragh			
1962	Bellaghy II			
1963	Magherafelt			
1964	Glen		Ógra Colmcille	
1965	Greenlough		Ógra Colmcille	
1966	Glen		An Lúb	
1967	Sarsfields			
1968	Desertmartin			
1969	Aghadowey			
1970	Ballymaguigan		Greenlough	
1971	Kilrea			
1972	Glack			
1973	Drum		Craigbane	
1974	Doire Colmcille			
1975	Faughanvale			
1976	Mullaghbuoy		An Lúb	
1977	Drum			
1978	Mullaghbuoy			
1979	Ballinascreen B			
1980	Ardmore			
1981	Glack			
1982	Drum			
1983	Claudy			
1984	An Lúb			
1985	Limavady		Glack	
1986	Greenlough			
1987	Dungiven Thirds		Lissan	
1988	Magilligan			
1989	An Lúb			
1990	Foreglen		Lissan	
1991	Ballinascreen Thirds			
1992	Dungiven Thirds			
1993	Ballinderry Thirds			
1994	Drum		Eoghan Rua	
1995	Moneymore			
1996	Drum			
1997	Eoghan Rua		Lissan	
1998	Lissan		Seán Dolan's	
1999	Limavady		Moneymore	
2000	Ardmore		Eoghan Rua	
2001	Ógra Colmcille		Ardmore	
2002	Ballerin		Limavady	
2003	Limavady		Drumsurn	
2004	Glen Thirds		Ógra Colmcille	
2005	Glen Thirds		Steelstown	
2006	Drum		Lissan	
2007	Lissan		Drum	
2008	Lissan		Glack	
2009	Seán Dolan's		Drum	
2010	Ardmore	2–07	Doire Trasna Na Piarsaigh	1–08
2011	Doire Trasna Na Piarsaigh		Drum	
2012	Drum			
2013	Ardmore		Doire Trasna Na Piarsaigh	
2014	Moneymore	1-09	Glack	0-11
2015	Faughanvale	2–09	Drum	1–05
2016	Magilligan	0-12	Drum	0-11
2017	Doire Trasna Na Piarsaigh	2-11	Limavady	0-09
2018	Limavady	1-19	Moneymore	2-06
2019	Glack	1–14	Drum	1–06
2020	Desertmartin	1–11	Craigbane	1–09
2021	Desertmartin	0–12	Seán Dolans	0–02
2022	Craigbane	1–11	Ballerin	1–06
2023	Ballymaguigan	2-15	Moneymore	0-07
2024	Craigbane	1-11	Ballymaguigan	0-10
2025	Slaughtmanus	2-15	Doire Trasna Na Piarsaigh	1-10

== Wins listed by club ==
#	Club	Wins	Years won
1	Drum	7	1973, 1977, 1982, 1994, 1996, 2006, 2012
2	Glen	5	1959, 1964, 1966, 2004, 2005
3	Limavady	4	1985, 1999, 2003, 2018
3	Ardmore	4	1980, 2000, 2010, 2013
3	Desertmartin	4	1950, 1968, 2020, 2021
4	Lissan	3	1998, 2007, 2008
4	Ballinascreen	3	1954, 1979, 1991
4	Greenlough	3	1953, 1965, 1986
4	Glack	3	1972, 1981, 2019
4	Ballymaguigan	3	1951, 1970, 2023
5	Doire Trasna Na Piarsaigh	2	2011, 2017
5	Faughanvale	2	1975, 2015
5	Swatragh	2	1955, 1961
5	Dungiven	2	1987, 1992
5	An Lúb	2	1984, 1989
5	Mullaghbuoy	2	1976, 1978
5	Sarsfields	2	1957, 1967
5	Magilligan	2	1988, 2016
5	Moneymore	2	1995, 2014
5	Magherafelt	2	1960, 1963
5	Craigbane	2	2022, 2024
6	Doire Colmcille	1	1974
6	Ógra Colmcille	1	2001
6	Kilrea	1	1971
6	Ballerin	1	2002
6	Banagher	1	1952
6	Slaughtneil	1	1956
6	Castledawson	1	1958
6	Aghadowey	1	1969
6	Bellaghy	1	1962
6	Eoghan Rua	1	1997
6	Claudy	1	1983
6	Foreglen	1	1990
6	Ballinderry	1	1993
6	Seán Dolan's	1	2009
6	Slaughtmanus	1	2025
