= Glossary of Gaelic games terms =

The following is an alphabetical list of terms and jargon used in relation to Gaelic games.

== Abbreviations ==
Competitions usually have long names, so an abbreviation system is used:

Level	Sport	Tournament type
M: Minor; U-20 or U20: Under-20; U-21 or U21: Under-21; J: Junior; I: Intermediate; S: Senior; N: National	C: Camogie; F: Gaelic football; H: Hurling; LF: Ladies' Gaelic football	L: League; C: Championship; S: Shield

For example:

- Leinster MHC: Leinster Minor Hurling Championship
- U20 FL Div 2: Under-20 Football League, Division 2
- Westmeath JBHC: Westmeath Junior "B" Hurling Championship
- Cork SCC: Cork Senior Camogie Championship
- AI JLFC: All-Ireland Junior Ladies' Football Championship

The term "GAA" is not normally used in competition names, particularly in GAA-only sports.

Other abbreviations include:

- ACL = All-County League, sometimes used in counties that also have regional leagues
- AI = All-Ireland
- CLG = Cumann Lúthchleas Gael, Irish for "Gaelic Athletic Association" or "Gaelic Athletic Club", e.g. CLG Naomh Anna, Leitir Móir
- CPG = Cumann Peil Gaelach, Irish for "Gaelic Football Club"
- GAA = Gaelic Athletic Association
- GAC = Gaelic Athletic Club, e.g. Kilcoo GAC
- GF = Gaelic football
- GFC = Gaelic Football Club, e.g. St Grellan's GFC
- GH = Gaelic handball
- HC = Hurling Club
- IAHA = Irish Amateur Handball Association
- ICHA = Irish Collegiate Handball Association
- LGFC = Ladies' Gaelic Football Club
- Pk = Park

== A ==
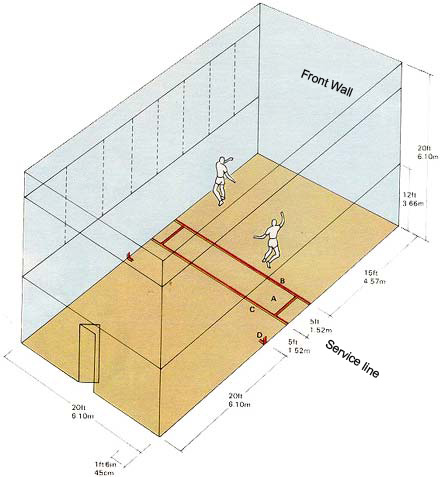
A typical handball "alley"

- A chara: Irish meaning literally "Dear friend". Often used to start official communications, even in English.
- Alley: the court in Gaelic handball, often measuring 12.2 m by 6.1 m (40 feet by 20 feet).
- All-Ireland: Adjective describing a competition, such as the All-Ireland Senior Football Championship, run by the GAA and whose winners become national champions at the grade of that competition. The All-Ireland can refer to an already mentioned All-Ireland championship; more generally it can refer to the All-Ireland Senior Football or Hurling Championship.
- All Star: An annual award, one of which is given to the best player in each of the fifteen positions in Gaelic football, hurling, ladies' football, and camogie.
- Áras: Irish, meaning a sports centre, or club (i.e. building).

== B ==
- Bainisteoir: Irish word meaning manager.
- Backdoor: Adjective describing a "knockout" championship in which defeated teams are not immediately eliminated from the competition, and remain eligible to win (e.g. Offaly in the 1998 All-Ireland Senior Hurling Championship). Such teams are said to re-enter the championship through the back door.
- Barracks games: (derogatory) nickname for "foreign sports" (see below) from their supposed connection with the British military. Also "the barracks" as in "go to the barracks" (i.e. watch one of the foreign sports).
- Bas: The flattened, curved end head of a hurley, or camán.
- Big Alley: the 60x30 foot court, the indigenous handball alley.
- Black card: Card shown to a player who has committed a "cynical" foul. The player is sent off to a sin bin for 10 minutes and can return to the field after that.
- Block: where one player prevents an opponent's strike by trapping the ball between his hurley and the opponent's swinging hurley.
- Book: See tick. Where the referee notes the name of a player, without giving a black, yellow, or red card. Akin to a warning.

== C ==
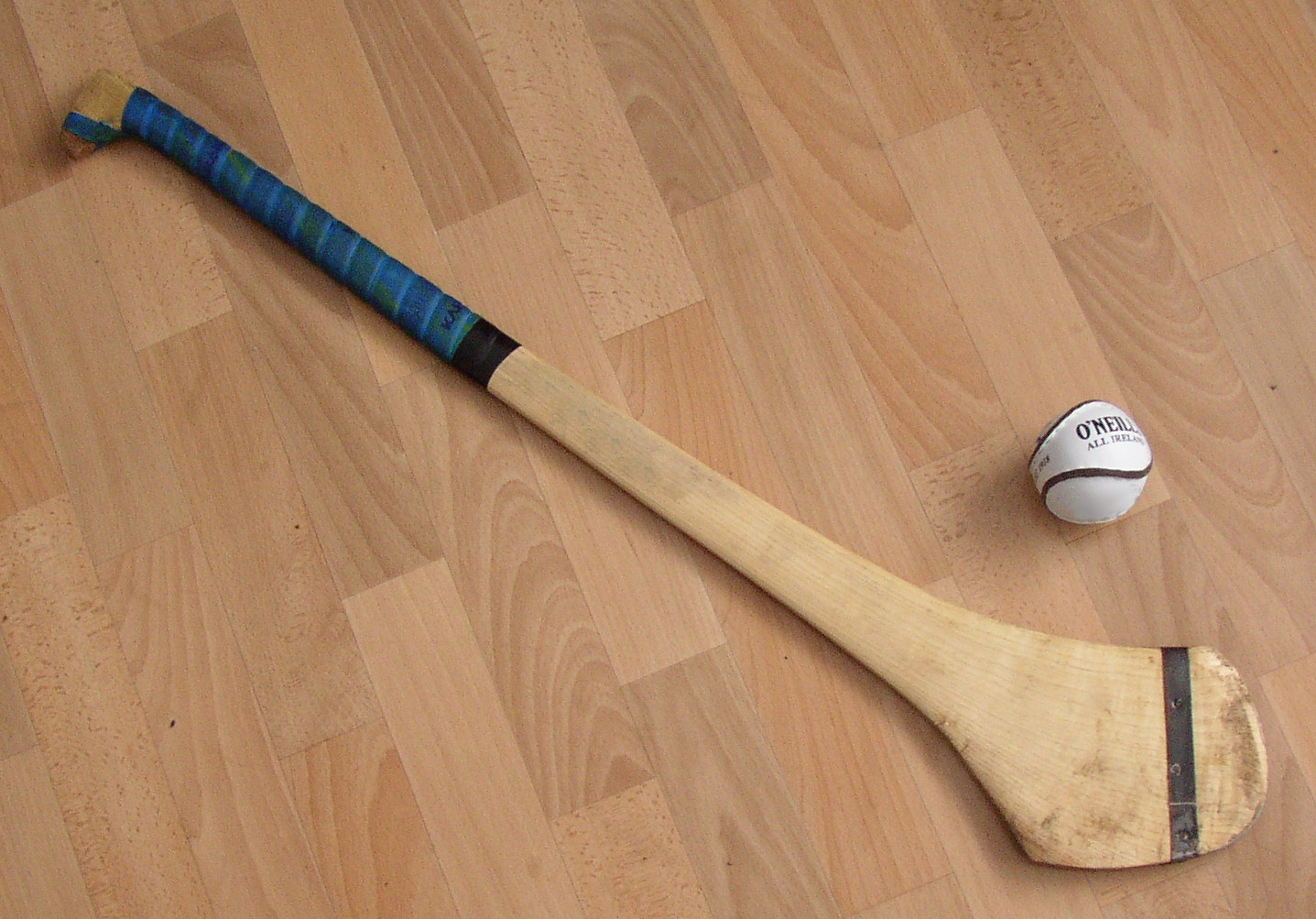
Camán (hurley), with sliotar (ball)

- Caid: Another name for Gaelic football, usually referring to precodified varieties in the south west of Ireland.
- Camán: Hurley or hurling stick.
- Camóg: A stick as used in camogie. Shorter than the similar implement (hurley) used in hurling.
- Camogie (camógaíocht): aversion of hurling, modified to suit women. A GAA coinage, from the Irish.
- Captain: a player assigned additional responsibilities before, during and after a match.
- Central Appeals Committee (CAC): Committee to which a unit or individual may bring their case if they are unsuccessful at the first hearing by the Central Hearings Committee (CHC).
- Central Competitions Control Committee (CCCC): Committee which organises fixtures for competitions above provincial level and proposes suspensions, fines, etc. on units and individuals who, in their view, have broken the rules.
- Central Hearings Committee (CHC): Committee to which a unit or individual first bring their case if they do not accept a penalty proposed by the Central Competitions Control Committee (CCCC).
- Challenge match: A type of game, usually played independent of any organised tournament.
- Cic Fada: A competition for Gaelic footballers based on accuracy of long kicking.
- Club: the basic organisational unit of the GAA, at least one of which exists in most parishes throughout Ireland. Clubs are commonly named after either the home district, or a saint or national hero associated with that district. If the club fields teams only in Gaelic football, that name is followed by GFC (Gaelic Football Club); for hurling-only clubs it is HC (Hurling Club), but for clubs involved in two or more Gaelic sports the usual term is GAC (Gaelic Athletic Club). All clubs are controlled by locally elected volunteer committees.
- Cluiche corr: rounders, the one Gaelic game widely adopted outside Ireland.
- An Coiste Náisiunta: The National Executive.
- Comhairle Cluiche Corr na hÉireann: Rounders Council of Ireland.
- An Comhdháil Náisiúnta: The National Council.
- Compromise rules/Composite rules: Games held between hurlers, and shinty players under modified rules. Not to be confused with "international rules".
- Corner back: Players who stand on either side of the full back, and who are defenders.
- County: a geographic region within the GAA, controlled by a County Board (sometimes called County Committee). In Ireland, there are 32 of these, corresponding closely to the boundaries of counties currently or formerly used for administrative purposes (but not the newer administrative counties in the Republic). However, counties as used in Gaelic games sometimes admit into their competitions clubs from neighbouring administrative counties, so that the Gaelic games county boundaries are more fluid than those used for government purposes. Most Gaelic games county names in Ireland are shared with current or former administrative counties, the sole exception at present being County Derry (the largely coterminous administrative county, abolished in 1973, was County Londonderry). Outside Ireland, for GAA purposes "county" often refers to places which are not otherwise termed counties, e.g. entire countries such as Scotland or American states such as New York. Many county boards have subsidiary boards or committees for different regions within the Gaelic games county.
- County colours: the colours of the kit worn by that county's representative team in inter-county competition.
- County championship: A championship in football or hurling in a specific grade contested by clubs within a county.
- Croke Park (in Irish Páirc an Chrócaigh; colloquially "Croker" or "Headquarters"): The principal stadium and headquarters of the Gaelic Athletic Association.
- Cúige: Irish for a province, plural cúigí.
- Cumann: Irish for club, society or association, can be found in various compounds.
- Cumann Camógaíochta na nGael: Irish for Camogie Association of Ireland.
- Cumann Lúthchleas Gael: the Irish language name of the Gaelic Athletic Association as a whole; also means "Gaelic Athletic Club".
- Cumann na mBunscol: the voluntary organisation of primary school teachers who coach GAA.
- Cumann Peil Gael na mBan: Irish for the Ladies' Gaelic Football Association

== D ==
Counties contesting the All-Ireland Senior Football Championship (yellow), All-Ireland Senior Hurling Championship (blue), or both (green)

- Disputes Resolution Authority (DRA): An external independent quasi-legal body which is the final arbiter in GAA disputes.
- Double, The: When a county wins the All-Ireland Senior Football Championship and the All-Ireland Senior Hurling Championship in the same year. It is very rare.
- Dual county: A county which plays both football and hurling at a similar level. Most counties specialise in one sport or the other.
- Dual player: A person who plays both football and hurling at a high level.

== E ==
- End line: The two shorter sides – the ends – of a football or hurling pitch, at the centre of which the goalposts are situated.
- Extra time: If the score is level in a match after normal time, extra time may be played. Initially two ten minute periods of extra time are played each way. If the score is still level, a further two five minute periods of extra time may be played each way.

== F ==
- Féile na nGael: literally "Festival of the Gaels", an annual tournament comprising the sports of hurling, camogie and handball.
- Féile Peile na nÓg: literally Festival of Youth Football, national festival of football for boys and girls under 14 years of age and is based on the GAA club unit.
- Fetch: To catch the ball above one's head.
- Football: Always Gaelic football. Association football is referred to as "soccer" in GAA terms – see foreign sports.
- Foreign sports: A phrase in common usage used to describe non-gaelic field games such as association football, rugby union, rugby league, field hockey and cricket, particularly in the sense that they rivalled Gaelic games for popularity in Ireland during the formative years of the GAA. Officially, the GAA does not use this phrase – specific sports (such as association football and horse racing) are banned from GAA grounds.
- Forty-five: Kick awarded in football to the attacking side 45 metres from the defending side's goal when a player for the defending side last touches the ball before it goes over that side's end line. Formerly known as a fifty (45 metres is roughly equivalent to 50 yards).
- 40x20: The international code of handball, introduced from the USA.
- Four Codes: the four types of handball administered by the GAA, aka 40x20, 60x30, One Wall and Hardball.
- Free, Free-in or Free-out: normal means of restarting play by the non-offending team after a foul.
- Free Taking Competition: If the score is level in a match after the two normal halves, two ten minute periods of extra time played each way may be played (depending on the rules for the relevant competition). If the score is still level after the first two halves of extra time, a further two five minute periods of extra time may be played. If the winner has not been determined by extra time, a free-taking competition may be held. Each team will nominate five players to take frees from their chosen position in front of the posts and with no defenders – on the forty five metre line in football and from the hands or from the ground, on the sixty five metre line in hurling. If the teams score an equal number of points from their five frees, the outcome of the match is decided by sudden death frees using the same nominated players in the same order.
- Full-back: a defender in the number 3 position. Has a very important role, normally playing directly in front of the goal, and is the last line of defence in front of the goalkeeper.

== G ==
- Gaelic games: The sports of Gaelic football, hurling, camogie, Gaelic handball and rounders.
- Goal: A score in football, hurling and camogie – worth three points, awarded when the ball legally crosses the goal line under the bar and between the posts.
- Goalkeeper: a defender in the number 1 position. The last line of defence in football and hurling, part of whose role it is to prevent the opposition from scoring goals.
- Golden score: A tie-breaking mechanism used in some knockout competitions. After a drawn game, play continues until one team scores a goal or a point; that team is the winner.
- Grade: A level at which a game or competition is played, based on age (e.g., Senior, Minor), ability (e.g. Senior, Junior), gender, etc. See Senior, Under-21 and Minor. A grade can also be split further, e.g. Senior A, Senior B.

== H ==
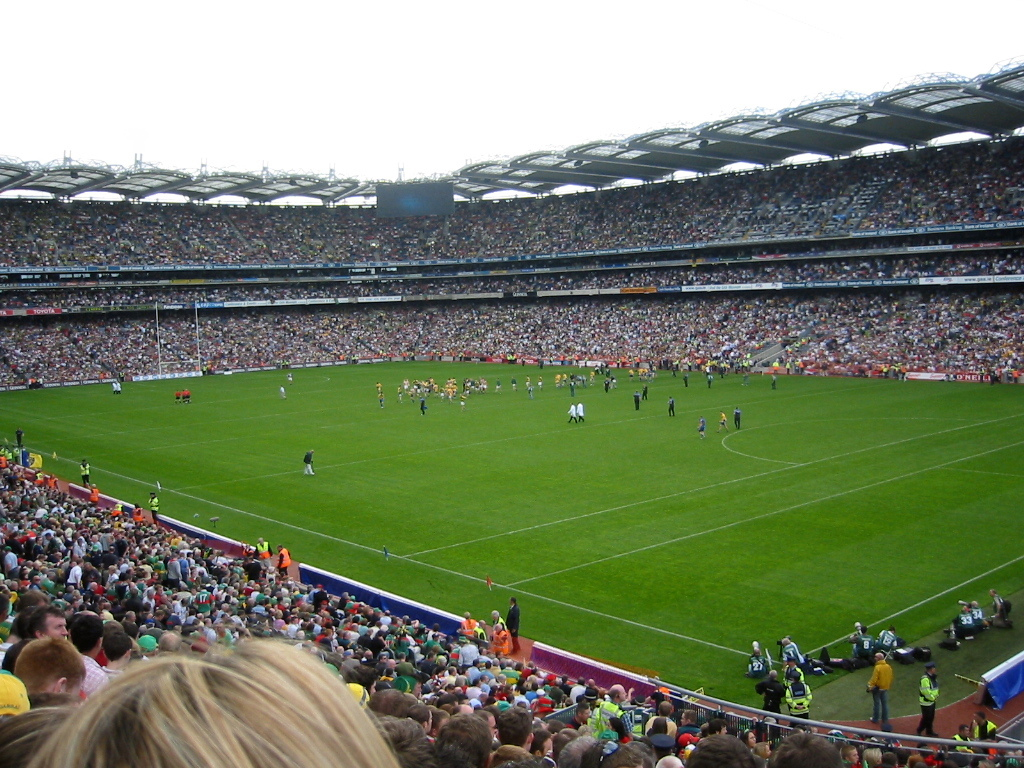
"HQ" aka Croke Park

- Hand-pass: In hurling, football and camogie, when a ball is slapped with the palm of the hand, rather than throwing (which is illegal). Hand-passing may not be used to score goals, but may be used to score points.
- Hardball: the most ancient form of handball. It is also the fastest of the Four Codes.
- Headquarters/HQ: Colloquial term for Croke Park, also known as "Croker".
- Home final: In competitions in which an overseas team gets a bye to the final, a final played between two teams from the island of Ireland. The winning team then plays the overseas team in the final proper. For example, the 1908 All-Ireland Senior Football Championship saw Dublin beat Kerry in the home final, before becoming All-Ireland champions by beating London in the actual final, which was London's only game in that year's championship.
- Hook: where a player approaches another player from a rear angle and attempts to catch the opponent's hurley with his own at the top of the swing.
- Hurley: The stick or bat used in hurling, also known as a camán.

== I ==
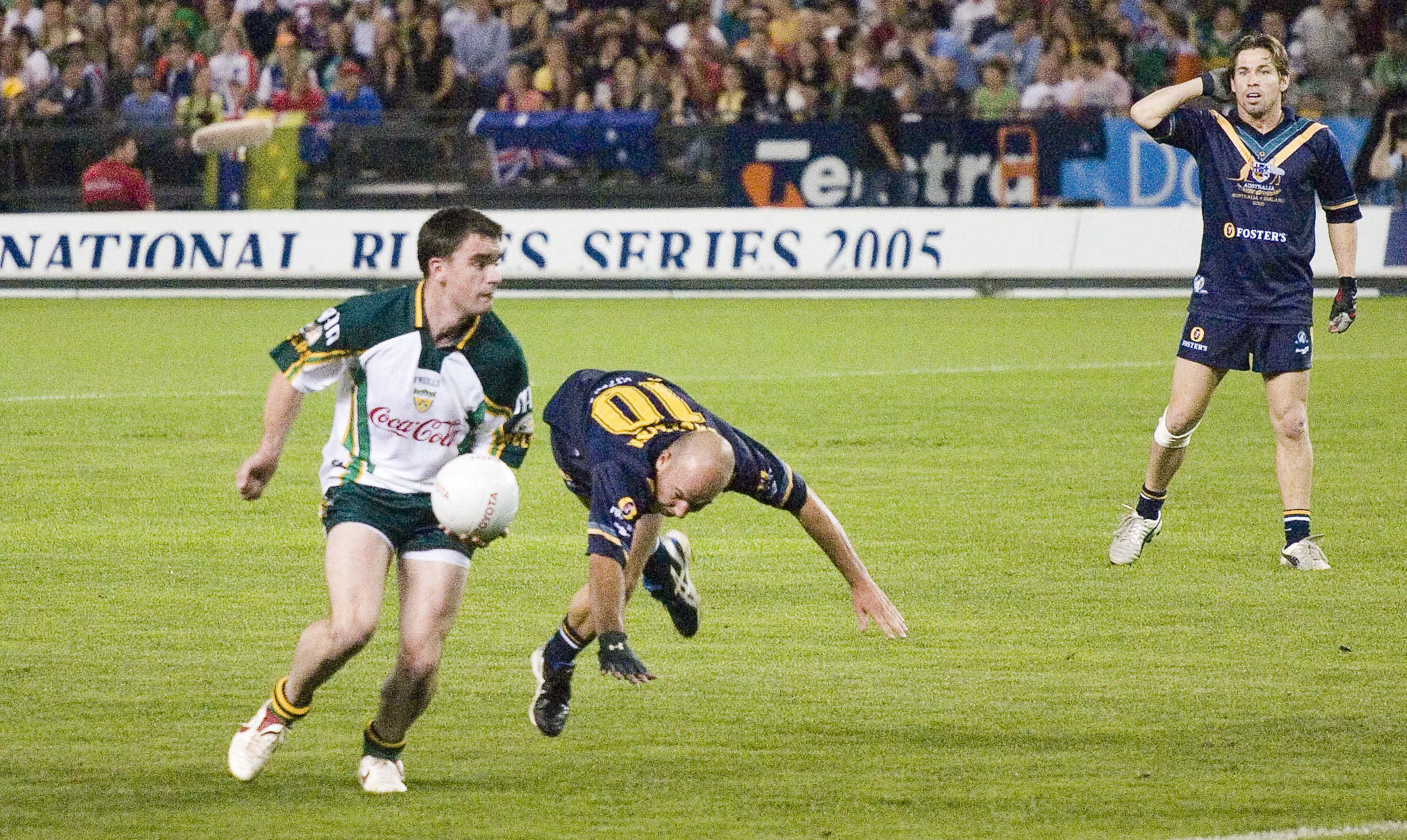
A game of international rules football in Melbourne, between Australia and Ireland

- Intermediate: A grade, higher than junior, of competition for players not quite good enough to play at senior level. Some championships have senior and junior – but no intermediate – equivalents, for example the All-Ireland Football Championships.
- Inter-county: Inter-county is Gaelic Athletic Association terminology which refers to competitions or matches between two county teams. The term can also be used to refer to players on the teams.
- International rules: Games played between Gaelic footballers, and Australian rules footballers under modified rules. Not to be confused with "compromise rules".
- Intervarsity: portmanteau of "Inter-university".
- Irish experiment: efforts by the Australian Football League to entice Gaelic footballers to Australia to play Australian rules football professionally.
- Irish handball: another name for Gaelic handball.
- Irish Handball Union or IHU: the non GAA handball body.

== J ==
- Junior: A grade of competition for players not quite good enough to play at senior level, or at intermediate level where the three levels exist.

== K ==
- Kick Fada (from Irish Cic Fada): A kicking competition for Gaelic footballers.
- Kickout: The kick, usually taken by the goalkeeper, which restarts a football match after the opposition has scored a goal or point or kicked a wide.

== L ==
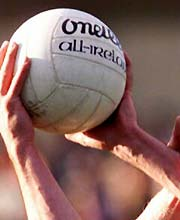
A liathróid being used for a Gaelic football match

- Liam: The Liam MacCarthy Cup, awarded to the winning team in the All-Ireland Senior Hurling Championship.
- Liathróid: Irish word for football, or handball, i.e. the ball itself. See also peil (below). A hurling ball is a sliotar.
- Liathróid láimhe: Irish for Gaelic handball.

== M ==
- Mark: A free-kick designed to encourage kicking in Gaelic football. It is available to a player who catches a ball cleanly which has travelled 20m without touching the ground in two circumstances –
  Kickout Mark: when the kickout travels beyond the 45m line
  Advanced Mark: when an attacking player in play (ie. not from a free-kick) on or beyond the opposition's 45m line kicks a ball over the opposition's 45m line
  The player who catches the ball, either an attacker or defender, can signal his intent to stop and take the free-kick resulting from the mark by raising an arm or playing on immediately.
- Manager: See bainisteoir.
- Minor: A grade for under-17 or under-18 players (depending on the competition rules); also, a person who qualifies to play in that grade.

== O ==
- Official Guide (Treoraí Oifigiúil): The playing and organisational rules of the GAA. Part 1 contains the Association's constitution and rules, while Part 2 contains the playing rules of hurling and football.
- One Wall: the most basic form of handball.
- Overhand stroke: A stroke in handball, similar to pitching in baseball.
- Overseas unit: GAA bodies outside Ireland.

== P ==
- Panel: The Gaelic games equivalent of a squad.
- Páirc: Irish for "park", this Irish word appears in the names of some sports grounds, e.g. Páirc Esler and Páirc Tailteann
- Páirc an Chrócaigh: Irish for Croke Park.
- Park: (see also) Páirc, a common element in the names of GAA grounds.
- Peil: Irish word for football, i.e. the game of Gaelic football. See also liathróid (above).
- Peil (Ghaelach) na mBan: Ladies' Gaelic football.
- Penalty shoot-out: Penalties may be taken in order to determine the winners if a game is level at the end of normal or extra time. Only goals count. Initially up to five penalties are taken by each team. If the number of goals scored from the five penalties are equal, sudden-death penalties are taken. A penalty shoot-out is sometimes used instead of a free-taking competition to determine the winners on the day.
- Poc Fada: A national competition in hurling and camogie, won by striking (pucking) the ball the fewest times to cover a set distance.
- Point: A score in football, camogie, ladies' football and hurling, awarded when the ball legally passes over the bar, between the posts. See also goal (above).
- Pre-shoot position: In handball, this is a position six foot deeper into the court than where the ball was contacted.
- Province: run by a Provincial council, these are collections of counties. They correspond to the provinces of Ireland with the addition of Britain. Provincial championships are the next level below All-Ireland.
- Puck, puckout: in hurling and camogie "puck" is an anglicisation of the onomatopoeic Irish word poc, meaning striking the ball with the stick. A puckout is when a goalkeeper pucks the ball back into play.

== Q ==
- Qualifiers: Name given to a separate system from the main competition in a double-elimination tournament where beaten teams are given another chance.

== R ==
- Red card: Card shown to a player who has been sent off for committing a serious foul, or who has been shown two yellow cards or a yellow card followed by a black card.
- Réiteoir: A referee.
- Right corner-back: a defender in the number 2 position.
- Roghnóir: A selector, who helps to pick a team. Usually a team has three of these, as well as a manager.
- Rule 21: A former rule in the GAA's Official Guide which forbade members of the British military or RUC from participation; abolished in 2001.
- Rule 27: A former rule in the GAA's Official Guide which forbade members from playing or attending foreign sports; abolished in 1971.
- Rule 42: A rule in the GAA's Official Guide which prevents foreign sports being played on GAA-controlled property. See List of non-Gaelic games played in Croke Park for exceptions to this rule (as from 2005).

== S ==
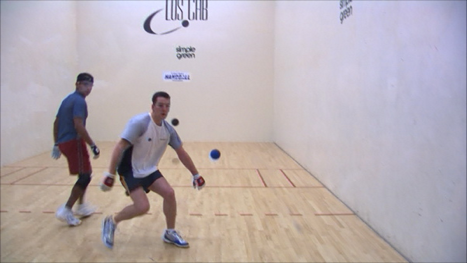
Tony Healy attempts a sidearm stroke

- Sam: The Sam Maguire Cup, awarded to the winning team in the All-Ireland Senior Football Championship.
- Scór: a division of the GAA charged with promotion of cultural activities, and the name of a series of annual competitions in such activities.
- Selector: See Roghnóir.
- Senior: The highest grade which a player can play at, not limited by age or ability.
- Shinty-hurling: composite rules
- Shot anticipation: in handball, this is where you work out where the ball will bounce back to.
- Sidearm stroke: A stroke in handball, where the ball is hit from around waist level.
- Sideline: The two longer sides of a football or hurling pitch.
- Sideline ball: A kick (football) or puck (hurling) awarded when the ball passes over the sideline. It is awarded to the opposite team to that of the player who last touched the ball.
- Sidepull/Side-pull: where two players running together for the sliotar will collide at the shoulders and swing together to win the tackle and "pull" (name given to swing the hurley) with extreme force.
- Sixty-five: Puck awarded in hurling to the attacking side 65 metres from the defending side's goal when a player for the defending side last touches the ball before it goes over that side's end line. Formerly known as a seventy (65 metres is roughly equivalent to 70 yards). A 45-metre puck is used in camogie.
- 60x30: the "Big Alley" court form of handball indigenous to Ireland.
- Sliotar: the hard leather ball used in hurling; slightly larger than a tennis ball, it has a cork core and a stitched rib. A football or handball is known as liathróid in Irish.
- Solo: In hurling, to run with the sliotar balanced or bouncing on the end of the hurley (also known as a solo run). In football, to drop the ball onto the toe and kick it back into the hands.
- Square: usually "the square", the small rectangle surrounding the goal in hurling, camogie and football.
- Square ball: A type of foul in hurling and football -
  - In football
    - For an attacking player to enter opponents' small rectangle during play before the final play of the ball into the small rectangle
    - For an attacking player to enter opponents' small rectangle during set play (free kicks) before the ball enters the small rectangle
  - In hurling
    - For an attacking player to enter opponents' small rectangle before the ball enters the small rectangle
- Stroke: a method of hitting the ball with the hand in handball.
- The Sunday Game: RTÉ's main Gaelic games television programme, on air since 1979.
- Super 8s: Common term used to describe the two four-team groups introduced in the All-Ireland Senior Football Championship in 2018 to replace the previous knock-out quarter-finals. Officially they are known as the All-Ireland Quarter-Final Groups.

== T ==
- Tailteann Games: Both a pre-Norman Gaelic sports and religious festival and a modern sports and cultural revival held 1924–32.
- Throw-in: the starting of a game, or restarting after half-time, by the referee throwing the ball between two players from each team.
- Tick: a mark made by the referee in their notebook against a player who has committed a certain type of foul, but not so serious as to warrant a yellow card (see below). If a player who is ticked in a match commits a second similar foul, they are shown a yellow card.
- Treoraí Oifigiúil: Official Guide.

== U ==
- Umpire: One of four officials in a game of football or hurling, identifiable by their white coat, whose responsibilities include to signal a point by waving a white flag, to signal a goal by waving a green flag, to indicate which side last touched the ball before it crossed the end-line, and to alert the referee to certain foul play.
- Underhand stroke: A stroke in handball, where the hand hits the ball from below the waist.
- Under-21: A grade of competition for players under 21 years of age.
- Up for the Match: An RTÉ One television programme shown twice a year on the eve of, respectively, the All-Ireland SHC and All-Ireland SFC finals.

== W ==
International rules football field

- Weak hand: In handball, this is the left hand for right-handed people (and right for left-handers). It is often exploited by opponents.
- Wide: When the ball passes over the end line having last been touched by a player on the attacking side. The defending side is awarded a kickout (football) or puckout (hurling).
- Winner on the day: If the score is level at the end of a match, the competition rules may require that a winner is determined on the day. Extra time may be played though the match could still be level at the end of this extra time. A tie-breaker in the form of a free-taking competition or penalty shoot-out will then be held.

== Y ==
- Yellow card: Card shown to a player who has been cautioned ("booked") for committing certain types of fouls, or who has been ticked twice (see Tick above). A player who is cautioned twice in a match (either two yellows or a yellow followed by a black) is immediately also shown a red card, sent off and cannot be replaced.
