= 2018 Down county football team season =

Down county football team
2018 season
- Manager: Éamonn Burns
- Stadium: Páirc Esler, Newry
- NFL D2: 7th (relegated)
- All-Ireland SFC: Round 2 qualifier
- Ulster SFC: Semi-finalist
- Dr McKenna Cup: Group stage (3rd)

The following is a summary of Down county football team's 2018 season.

== Kits ==
Home	Away

== Competitions ==
Win Draw Loss Postponed/Cancelled

=== Dr McKenna Cup ===
The draw for the 2018 Dr McKenna Cup was made in November 2017.

==== Fixtures ====
Down's tie against the University of Ulster was postponed due to an unplayable pitch.

Date	Round	Home	Score	Away	Ground	Ref
3 Jan	Group	Down	0-13 v 2-12	Armagh	Páirc Esler, Newry	
7 Jan	Group	Down	v	University of Ulster	St. Mary's Park, Burren	
10 Jan	Group	Derry	1-14 v 2-10	Down	Owenbeg, Dungiven	
14 Jan	Group	Down	1-14 v 0-09	University of Ulster	St. Mary's Park, Burren	

==== Table ====
Pos	Team	Pld	W	D	L	PF	PA	PR	Pts	Qualification
1	Armagh	3	2	1	0	47	38	1.237	5	Advance to semi-final
2	Derry	3	2	0	1	50	52	0.962	4	
3	Down	3	1	0	2	46	44	1.045	2	
4	Ulster University	3	0	1	2	40	49	0.816	1	

Updated to match(es) played on 14 January 2018. Source: Ulster GAA

=== National Football League Division 2 ===
Down played in Division Two of the National Football League in 2018.

==== Fixtures ====
Fixtures for the 2018 National League were announced on 13 October 2017. Down's fifth fixture against Cavan was postponed due to 2018 Great Britain and Ireland cold wave. The game was rescheduled for 10 March 2018. Due to further snow in March the fixture against Tipperary on 18 March was also postponed.

Despite a victory on the final day of the campaign, Down were relegated to Division 3 following a win for Meath over Louth on the same day.

Date	Round	Home	Score	Away	Ground	Ref
Sunday 27 January	Group	Louth	0-11 v 1-14	Down	Drogheda Park	
Sunday 4 February	Group	Down	0-10 v 1-13	Cork	Páirc Esler, Newry	
Sunday 11 February	Group	Roscommon	0-07 v 0-12	Down	Dr. Hyde Park, Roscommon	
Sunday 25 February	Group	Down	1-10 v 1-12	Clare	Páirc Esler, Newry	
Saturday 3 March	Group	Cavan	P v P	Down	Kingspan Breffni Park, Cavan	
Saturday 10 March	Group	Cavan	0-17 v 0-14	Down	Kingspan Breffni Park, Cavan	
Sunday 18 March	Group	Down	P v P	Tipperary	Páirc Esler, Newry	
Sunday 25 March	Group	Meath	4-14 v 1-14	Down	Páirc Tailteann, Navan	
Saturday 31 March	Group	Down	2-10 v 1-10	Tipperary	Páirc Esler, Newry	

==== Table ====
Pos	Team	Pld	W	D	L	PF	PA	PD	Pts	Qualification or relegation
1	Roscommon	7	5	1	1	126	105	+21	11	Advance to Division 2 Final
2	Cavan	7	5	1	1	122	99	+23	11	Advance to Division 2 Final
3	Clare	7	3	2	2	101	111	−10	8	
4	Tipperary	7	3	1	3	128	106	+22	7	
5	Meath	7	3	1	3	126	112	+14	7	
6	Cork	7	3	0	4	111	108	+3	6	
7	Down	7	3	0	4	100	106	−6	6	Relegation to Division 3
8	Louth	7	0	0	7	76	143	−67	0	Relegation to Division 3

Updated to match(es) played on 25 March 2018. Source: GAA.ie
Rules for classification: 1) League points 2) Where only two teams are involved, the outcome of the meeting of the two teams in the competition 3) Scoring Difference 4) Highest Total Score For 5) A Play-Off.

==== Results ====
28 January 2018
14:00
Round 1

Louth	0-11 - 1-14	Down
William Woods 0-6 (5fs), Tommy Durnin 0-2, Derek Maguire 0-2, Andy McDonnell 0-1.	Report	Connaire Harrison 1-3, Darragh O’Hanlon 0-3 (3fs), Aaron Morgan and Caolan Mooney 0-2 each, Niall Donnelly, and Shay Millar, Donal O'Hare and Kevin McKernan 0-1 each.

Drogheda Park, Drogheda
Referee: Cormac Reilly (Meath)
4 February 2018
14:00
Round 2

Down	0-10 - 1-13	Cork
A Doherty (0-3, 3f); D O'Hanlon (0-2, 2f), C Mooney, C Maginn, S Millar (0-1); C Harrison, K McKernan (all 0-1).	Report	M Collins (1-5, 2f), C O'Neill (0-5, 4f), S White (0-2), P Kelleher (0-1).

Páirc Esler, Newry
Referee: Fergal Kelly (Longford)
11 February 2018
14:00
Round 3

Roscommon	0-07 - 0-12	Down
Cian McKeon (2fs), Diarmuid Murtagh (2fs) and Donie Smith (1 '45) 0-2 each, Conor Devaney 0-1.	Report	Donal O'Hare 0-3 (2fs), Niall Donnelly, Caolan Mooney, Ryan Johnston, Colm Flanagan, Anthony Doherty ('45), Darren O'Hagan, Darragh O’Hanlon (f), Barry O'Hagan, Niall Madine 0-1 each

Dr Hyde Park, Roscommon
Referee: Sean Hurson (Tyrone)
25 February 2018
14:00
Round 4

Down	1-10 - 1-12	Clare
Donal O'Hare 1-4 (3f), Anthony Doherty 0-2 (1f, one '45'), Shay Millar 0-1, Darragh O'Hanlon 0-1, Caolan Mooney 0-1, Aaron Morgan 0-1	Report	Eoin Cleary 0-7 (6f), Sean O'Donoghue 1-0, Cian O'Dea 0-1, Kieran Malone 0-1, Keelan Sexton 0-1, Eoghan Collins 0-1, David Tubridy 0-1

Pairc Esler, Newry
Referee: James Molloy (Galway)
10 March 2018
19:00
Round 5

Cavan	0-17 - 0-14	Down
Gearoid McKiernan 0-4, Caoimhin O'Reilly 0-3 (2fs), Cian Mackey 0-2, Conor Bradley 0-2, Raymond Galligan 0-1 (45), Bryan Magee 0-1 (f), Dara McVeety 0-1, Conor Moynagh 0-1, Oisin Kiernan 0-1	Report	Donal O'Hare 0-4 (3fs), Connaire Harrison 0-3 (1f), Anthony Doherty 0-2 (2fs), Shay Millar 0-1, Ryan Johnston 0-1, Caolan Mooney 0-1, Ruairi Wells 0-1, Kevin McKernan 0-1

Breffni Park, Cavan
Referee: Padraig O’Sullivan (Kerry)
25 March 2018
15:00
Round 6

Meath	4-14 - 1-14	Down
Donal Lenihan 1-5 (1-0 pen, 3fs, 1'45); Graham Reilly 1-2, Padraig McKeever 1-1, Sean Tobin 1-0, Cillian O'Sullivan 0-3, Ben Brennan 0-1, Bryan Menton 0-1, Paddy Kennelly 0-1	Report	Donal O'Hare 0-5 (5fs), Anthony Doherty 1-1, Connaire Harrison 0-2, Darragh O'Hanlon 0-2 (2fs), Kevin McKernan 0-1, Darren O'Hagan 0-1, Caolan Mooney 0-1, Ryan McAleenan 0-1

Páirc Tailteann, Navan
Referee: Barry Tiernan (Dublin)
31 March 2018
15:00
Round 7

Down	2-10 - 1-10	Tipperary
Donal O'Hare 1-2 (pen, 2f), Sean Dornan 1-1, Caolan Mooney 0-3, Conor Maginn 0-2, Peter Turley 0-1, Anthony Doherty 0-1 ('45'), Ryan Johnston 0-1	Report	Michael Quinlivan 1-1, Jack Kennedy 0-3 (2f), Conor Sweeney 0-3 (1f), Kevin O'Halloran 0-2 (1f), Kevin Fahey 0-1, Josh Keane 0-1 (f).

Páirc Esler, Newry
Referee: Barry Cassidy (Derry)

=== Ulster Senior Football Championship ===
The draw for the 2018 Ulster Senior Football Championship took place on 19 October 2017, with Down being drawn at home to Antrim in the quarter-final stage. Down progressed to the Ulster semi-finals but lost to Donegal in Clones on 10 June.

==== Fixtures ====
Date	Round	Team 1	Score	Team 2	Ground	Ref
Saturday 26 May 2018	Quarter Final	Down	1-18 v 0-14	Antrim	Pairc Esler, Newry	
Sunday 10 June 2018	Semi Final	Down	1-12 v 2-22	Donegal	St Tiernach's Park, Clones	

==== Bracket ====
Preliminary round
Donegal	2-20
Cavan	1-15

Quarter-finals
Fermanagh	0-12
Armagh	0-7
Tyrone	1-16
Monaghan	1-18
Down	1-18
Antrim	0-14
Derry	0-16
Donegal	2-16

Semi-finals
Fermanagh	1-8
Monaghan	0-10
Down	1-12
Donegal	2-22

Final
Fermanagh	0-12
Donegal	2-18

==== Results ====
26 May 2018
19:00
Quarter Final

Down	0-11 - 1-14	Antrim
D O'Hare 7 (5f), A Doherty 3 (3f), S Millar 2, S Dornan 2, B McArdle 1, C Mooney 1, K McKernan 1-1, C Harrison 1	Report	P McBride 4 (2f), C Murray 4 (1f), R Murray 2 (1f), M Fitzpatrick 1, C Duffin 1

Páirc Esler, Newry
Attendance: 5,589
Referee: Derek O'Mahony (Tipperary)
10 June 2018
16:00
Semi Final

Down	1-12 - 2-22	Donegal
D O'Hare 0-4 (3f), C Harrison 0-4, C Maginn 0-2, C Mooney 0-1, N Donnelly 1-1	Report	P McBrearty 0-6 (3f), M Murphy 0-5 (3f), J Brennan 0-3, P Brennan 1-2, R McHugh 0-2, C Ward 0-1, C Thompson 0-1, S McMenamin 0-1, M McHugh 0-1, L McLoone 1-0

St Tiernach's Park, Clones
Attendance: 12,051
Referee: Anthony Nolan (Wicklow)

=== All-Ireland Senior Football Championship ===
==== Fixtures ====
Date	Round	Team 1	Score	Team 2	Ground	Ref
Saturday 23 June	Round 2	Cavan	1-14 v 0-15	Down	Brewster Park, Enniskillen	

==== Results ====
23 June 2018
19:00
Round 2

Cavan	1-14 - 0-15	Down
Padraig Faulkner (0-1), Enda Ciaran Brady (0-2), Sean McCormack (0-1), Oisin Kiernan (0-1), Gearoid McKiernan (1-2), Niall Murray (0-2), Conor Bradley (0-1), Dara McVeety (0-1), Sean Johnston (0-3f)	Report	Anthony Doherty (0-4f), Peter Turley (0-1), Ronan Millar (0-4, 3f), Kevin McKernan (0-1), Conor Maginn (0-1), Sean Dornan (0-2), Connaire Harrison (0-1), David McKibbin (0-1)

Brewster Park, Enniskillen
Referee: Cormac Reilly (Meath)
