= 2018 Donegal county football team season =

Donegal county football team
2018 season
- Manager: Declan Bonner
- Stadium: MacCumhaill Park, Ballybofey
- NFL D1: 7th (relegated)
- All-Ireland SFC: Quarter-finalist
- Ulster SFC: Winners
- Dr McKenna Cup: Winners

The following is a summary of Donegal county football team's 2018 season.

== Personnel changes ==
Declan Bonner began his second spell in charge of the team. John McElholm was appointed team trainer and Gary Boyle coach. Paul Fisher led the strength and conditioning team, Ronan Doherty joined as nutritionist and Cathal Ellis was there as physiotherapist, psychologist Anthony McGrath and video analyst Chris Byrne. Karl Lacey also became part of the coaching team ahead of the 2018 season.

Nathan Mullins, son of former Dublin player Brian, played for Donegal during the 2018 season. He made his debut against Queen's in the 2018 Dr McKenna Cup.

Kevin McBrearty, who had first been called up ahead of the 2015 Dr McKenna Cup, played in the 2018 National Football League.

Goalkeeper Shaun Patton came into the team versus Kildare in the National Football League. He began training in January 2018. Peter Boyle quit in a dispute over Patton replacing him in the team. Mark Anthony McGinley, the other goalkeeper, also quit the county panel — and the sport entirely.

Eoin McHugh was not involved for the 2018 season, electing to go to Boston instead. Michael Carroll also left the panel.

Jason McGee and Niall O'Donnell both missed the 2018 championship after deciding to play for the under-20 team instead.

Karl Lacey retired at the end of the previous season.

Leo McLoone returned after voluntarily departing the previous year. Likewise Odhrán Mac Niallais. And Anthony Thompson.

== Competitions ==
=== Dr McKenna Cup ===
Donegal won the McKenna Cup in 2018.

=== National Football League Division 1 ===
Fixtures for the 2018 National League were announced on 13 October 2017.

==== Table ====
Possible problem: 875 total for != 873 total against

Pos	Team	Pld	W	D	L	PF	PA	PD	Pts	Qualification
1	Galway	7	6	1	0	106	83	+23	13	Advance to Division 1 Final
2	Dublin	7	5	1	1	131	99	+32	11	Advance to Division 1 Final
3	Monaghan	7	5	0	2	106	100	+6	10	
4	Tyrone	7	4	0	3	114	98	+16	8	
5	Kerry	7	3	0	4	114	127	−13	6	
6	Mayo	7	2	1	4	94	110	−16	5	
7	Donegal	7	1	1	5	109	126	−17	3	Relegation to Division 2
8	Kildare	7	0	0	7	101	130	−29	0	Relegation to Division 2

Updated to match(es) played on 25 March 2018. Source: GAA.ie
Rules for classification: 1) League points 2) Where only two teams are level, the winner of the game between the two teams is ranked first 3) Scoring Difference 4) Highest Total Score For 5) A Play-Off.

==== Fixtures ====
Sunday, 28 January	Kerry	2-18 (24) – 3-14 (23)	Donegal	Fitzgerald Stadium, Killarney
2:00pm	Seán O'Shea 0-7 (0-4f), Paul Geaney 1-2 (0-1 pen), Stephen O'Brien 1-1, Barry John Keane 0-2, Gavin Crowley, Ronan Shanahan, Micheál Burns, David Clifford (0-1f), Daithi Casey, Killian Spillane 0-1 each	Report	Paddy McBrearty 0-10 (0-8f), Odhran MacNiallais 1-2, Tony McCleneghan and Darach O'Connor 1-0 each, Jamie Brennan and Stephen McBrearty 0-1 each	Referee: Paddy Neilan (Roscommon); Man of the Match: Paddy McBrearty (Kilcar)

Sunday, 4 February	Donegal	0-14 (14) – 1-12 (15)	Galway	O'Donnell Park, Letterkenny
2:30pm	Paddy McBrearty 0-9 (0-6f), Stephen McBrearty 0-2, Ryan McHugh, Paul Brennan, Ciaran McGinley 0-1 each	Report	Shane Walsh 0-6 (0-4f), Eamonn Brannigan 1-0, Damien Comer 0-3, Johnny Heaney, Paul Conroy, Sean Armstrong 0-1 each	Referee: Padraig Hughes (Armagh)

Saturday, 10 February	Dublin	0-20 (20) – 0-15 (15)	Donegal	Croke Park, Dublin
7:00pm	Niall Scully and Colm Basquel (0-1f) 0-4 each, Brian Fenton, Ciarán Kilkenny, Paul Mannion (0-1f) 0-2 each, Eric Lowndes, Brian Howard, Paddy Andrews, Eoghan O'Gara, Ciaran Reddin, Paddy Small 0-1 each	Report	Paddy McBrearty 0-7 (0-3f), Ryan McHugh, Stephen McBrearty, Jamie Brennan 0-2 each, Mark McHugh and Ciarán Thompson 0-1 each	Attendance: 21,400; Referee: Joe McQuillan (Cavan); Man of the Match: Colm Basquel (Ballyboden St Enda's)

Sunday, 25 February	Donegal	1-15 (18) – 3-07 (16)	Kildare	Fr Tierney Park, Ballyshannon
2:00pm		Report

Saturday, 10 March	Tyrone	2-13 (19) – 1-10 (13)	Donegal	Healy Park, Omagh
7:00 pm	Lee Brennan 0-5 (0-4f), Niall Sludden and Mark Bradley 1-1 each, Conor McAliskey 0-3f, Niall Morgan (0-1f), Cathal McShane, Peter Harte 0-1 each	Report	Odhran Mac Niallais 1-2, Michael Murphy 0-3f, Eoghan Bán Gallagher, Eamonn Doherty, Hugh McFadden, Mark McHugh, Stephen McBrearty 0-1 each	Attendance: 5,850; Referee: David Coldrick (Meath)

Sunday, 18 March	Monaghan	1-16 (19) – 1-10 (13)	Donegal	St Tiernach's Park, Clones
2:00pm		Report

Sunday, 25 March	Donegal	0-13 (13) – 0-13 (13)	Mayo	MacCumhaill Park, Ballybofey
3:00pm	Paddy McBrearty 0-4 (0-2f), Eoghan Bán Gallagher, Jamie Brennan, Michael Murphy (0-1f) 0-2 each, Frank McGlynn, Ciarán Thompson, Odhran MacNiallais 0-1 each	Report	Conor Loftus 0-6 (0-5f), Andy Moran 0-3, Kevin McLoughlin 0-2, Eoin O'Donghue and Joason Doherty 0-1 each	Attendance: 11,250; Referee: Anthony Nolan (Wicklow); Man of the Match: Eoghan Bán Gallagher (Killybegs)

=== Ulster Senior Football Championship ===
The draw for the 2018 Ulster Senior Football Championship took place on 19 October 2017. Donegal won their first Ulster title for four years.

==== Bracket ====
Preliminary round
Donegal	2-20
Cavan	1-15

Quarter-finals
Fermanagh	0-12
Armagh	0-7
Tyrone	1-16
Monaghan	1-18
Down	1-18
Antrim	0-14
Derry	0-16
Donegal	2-16

Semi-finals
Fermanagh	1-8
Monaghan	0-10
Down	1-12
Donegal	2-22

Final
Fermanagh	0-12
Donegal	2-18

==== Fixtures ====
BBC
deferred

13 May 2018
4:00 pm
Preliminary Round

Report

Donegal	2-20 (26) – (18) 1-15	Cavan
(HT: 1-10 – 1-06)
Gls: R. McHugh 1, C. Mulligan 1 Pts: M. Murphy 6 (3f), P. McBrearty 4, C. Thompson 3, M. Langan 3, J. Brennan 2, C. Ward 1, L. McLoone 1		Gls: C. O'Reilly 1 Pts: G. McKiernan 7 (2f), C. O'Reilly 3 (3f), C. Mackey 2 (1f), N. Murray 1, B. Magee 1, A. Cole 1

Páirc MacCumhaill, Ballybofey
Referee: David Gough (Meath)
Attendance: 9,612

BBC
deferred

27 May 2018
4:00 pm
Quarter-Final D

Report

Derry	0-16 (16) – (22) 2-16	Donegal
(HT: 0-07 – 1-10)
Pts: E Bradley 8 (5f), M Lynch 5 (4f), J Kielt 2, N Toner 1		Gls: H McFadden 1, C Mulligan 1 Pts: P McBrearty 8 (3f), L McLoone 3, M Murphy 2 (1 ’45), R McHugh 2, J Brennan (0-01)

Celtic Park, Derry
Referee: Maurice Deegan (Laois)
Attendance: 9,356

BBC
deferred

10 June 2018
4:00 pm
Semi-Final 2

Report

Down	1-12 (15) – (28) 2-22	Donegal
(HT: 0-07 – 1-12)
Gls: N Donnelly 1 Pts: D O’Hare 4 (3f), C Harrison 4, C Maginn 2, C Mooney 1, N Donnelly 1		Gls: L McLoone 1, J Brennan 1 Pts: P McBrearty 6 (3f), M Murphy 5 (3f), J Brennan 3, P Brennan 2, R McHugh 2, C Ward 1, C Thompson 1, S McMenamin 1, M McHugh 1

St Tiernach's Park, Clones
Referee: Anthony Nolan (Wicklow)
Attendance: 12,051

RTÉ
BBC

24 June 2018
2:00pm
Ulster Final

Report

Fermanagh	0-12 (12) – (24) 2-18	Donegal
(HT: 0-05 – 2-07)
Pts: Sean Quigley 5 (5f), Seamus Quigley 3 (1f), B Mulrone 1, E Donnelly 1, C Jones 1, C Corrigan 1		Gls: EB Gallagher 1, R McHugh 1 Pts: M Murphy 4 (3f), C Thompson 3 (1f), P Brennan 2, P McGrath 1, EB Gallagher 1, O MacNiallais 1, M Langan 1, P McBrearty 1, J Brennan 1, M McHugh 1, D O’Connor 1

St. Tiernach's Park, Clones
Referee: David Gough (Meath)
Attendance: 28,150

=== All-Ireland Senior Football Championship ===
==== Quarter-finals Group 2 table ====
Pos	Team	Pld	W	D	L	PF	PA	PD	Pts	Qualification
1	Dublin	3	3	0	0	74	52	+22	6	Advance to semi-finals
2	Tyrone	3	2	0	1	73	51	+22	4	Advance to semi-finals
3	Donegal	3	1	0	2	52	57	−5	2	
4	Roscommon	3	0	0	3	53	92	−39	0	

Updated to match(es) played on 5 August 2018. Source: GAA.ie

==== Fixtures ====
14 July 2018 Phase 1	Dublin	2-15 (21) – (16) 0-16	Donegal	Dublin
19:00 IST (UTC+1)		(HT: 1-09 – 0-08)		Venue: Croke Park
	Gls: N Scully 2 Pts: D Rock 7 (5f, 1 '45'), B Howard 2, C Costello 2, P Flynn 2, C Kilkenny 1, J McCarthy 1	Report	Pts: M Murphy 6 (3f, 1 '45'), J Brennan 3, M Langan 2, R McHugh 2, C Thompson 1, F McGlynn 1, É Doherty 1	Referee: Conor Lane (Cork); Attendance: 53,501 (double header); TV: RTÉ

21 July 2018 Phase 2	Roscommon	0-13 (13) – (20) 0-20	Donegal	Roscommon
17:00 IST (UTC+1)		(HT: 0-05 – 0-10)		Venue: Dr Hyde Park
	Pts: C Murtagh 5 (3f), D Murtagh 2, B Stack 2, C Lennon 2, C Compton 1, E Smith 1	Report	Pts: M Murphy 9 (3f, 1'45), OM Niallais 4, C Thompson 2 (1f), M Langan 1, L McLoone 1, J Brennan 1, R McHugh 1, M Reilly 1	Referee: Ciaran Branagan (Down); Attendance: 9,583; TV: Sky Sports

5 August 2018 Phase 3	Donegal	1-13 (16) – (23) 2-17	Tyrone	Ballybofey
15:30 IST (UTC+1)		(HT: 1-06 – 0-06)		Venue: MacCumhaill Park
	Gls: M Murphy 1 Pts: J Brennan 3, M Murphy 2 (1f, 1 45’), OM Niallais 2, P McGrath 1, EB Gallagher 1, M Langan 1, R McHugh 1, C Thompson 1, N O’Donnell 1	Report	Gls: H Loughran 1, D McClure 1 Pts: L Brennan 4 (1f), C McAliskey 2 (2f), P Hampsey 2, M Donnelly 2, N Morgan 1 (1f), R McNamee 1, T McCann 1, P Harte 1 (1f), C Cavanagh 1, M Bradley 1, K McGeary 1	Referee: Joe McQuillan (Cavan); Attendance: 16,242; TV: RTÉ

== Management team ==
Confirmed in November 2017:

- Manager: Declan Bonner
- Assistant manager: Paul McGonigle, not listed among November 2017 appointments
- Head coach: John McElholm
- Coach: Gary Boyle
- Selector: Karl Lacey until end of 2018 season but Lacey actually carried on until the end of 2020
- Goalkeeping coach: Andrew McGovern
- Strength and conditioning coach: Paul Fisher
- Nutritionist: Ronan Doherty
- Team physician: Kevin Moran
- Physio: Cathal Ellis
- Psychology and performance manager: Anthony McGrath, previously involved with the minor team
- Video analysis: Chris Byrne
- Logistics: Packie McDyre
- Kitman: Barry McBride

== Awards ==
=== Player of the Year ===
Eoghan Bán Gallagher

=== GAA.ie Football Team of the Week ===
- 29 January: Patrick McBrearty
- 12 February: Patrick McBrearty
- 26 February: Ryan McHugh, Patrick McBrearty
- 14 May: ?
- 28 May: ?
- 11 June: Paul Brennan, Ryan McHugh, Jamie Brennan
- 25 June: Eoghan Bán Gallagher, Ryan McHugh, Michael Murphy; McHugh nominated for Footballer of the Week
- 23 July: ?
- 6 August: ?

=== Donegal News Sports Personality of the Month ===
Eoghan Bán Gallagher: June

=== The Irish News Ulster All Stars ===
Eoghan Bán Gallagher (first appearance), Michael Murphy (sixth appearance) and Ryan McHugh (fourth appearance) were all included.

=== The Sunday Game Team of the Year ===
The Sunday Game selected Eoghan Bán Gallagher at left corner-back on its Team of the Year.

=== All Stars ===
Ryan McHugh won an All Star. Eoghan Bán Gallagher and Michael Murphy were also nominated.

Pos.	Player	Team	Appearances
GK	Rory Beggan	Monaghan	1
RCB	Jonny Cooper	Dublin	2
FB	Colm Cavanagh	Tyrone	2
LCB	Pádraig Hampsey	Tyrone	1
RWB	Karl O'Connell	Monaghan	1
CB	James McCarthy	Dublin	3
LWB	Jack McCaffrey	Dublin	3
MD	Brian Fenton^{FOTY}	Dublin	3
MD	Brian Howard	Dublin	1
RWF	Paul Mannion	Dublin	2
CF	Ciarán Kilkenny	Dublin	3
LWF	Ryan McHugh	Donegal	2
RCF	David Clifford	Kerry	1
FF	Conor McManus	Monaghan	3
LCF	Ian Burke	Galway	1

County breakdown

- Dublin = 7
- Monaghan = 3
- Tyrone = 2
- Kerry = 1
- Donegal = 1
- Galway = 1
