= Nathan Mullins =

Irish Gaelic footballer

Personal information
- Born: 1989/90

Sport
- Sport: Gaelic football
- Position: Midfield
Club
- Years: Club
- 201?–: St Vincents
Club titles
- All-Ireland Titles: 1
Inter-county
- Years: County
- 201?–: Donegal
- Ulster titles: 1

Nathan Mullins (born 1989/90) is an Irish Gaelic footballer who plays for St Vincents and also, formerly, the Donegal county team.

== Early life ==
Nathan Mullins is the youngest of three sons fathered by former Dublin midfielder Brian Mullins. When Mullins Snr was made principal of Carndonagh Community School in 1991, the family moved to Inishowen, where they lived for a decade. They then returned to Dublin, though one of Mullins Jnr's brothers later moved to Clonmany and Mullins Jnr maintained links with his adopted county.

== Playing career ==
Jim McGuinness was aware of this and persuaded Mullins to move north-west in 2011. Mullins played for the Donegal under-21 team.

He sustained numerous injuries early in his career, including hamstring issues and breaking both legs, so did not make much progress with his club St Vincents until he was aged 26. He made a substitute appearance in the last seconds of the 2013–14 All-Ireland Senior Club Football Championship final. Three years later he was awarded the title of Dublin club footballer of the year.

The newly appointed Donegal manager Declan Bonner expressed interest in his services ahead of the 2018 season. Mullins scored a first-half goal on his debut against Queen's in the 2018 Dr McKenna Cup. Mullins became seen as potentially advantageous, in that Michael Murphy could be moved further forward during games. In the opening fixture of the National Football League away to Kerry, Mullins started alongside Hugh McFadden in midfield; his league debut lasted twenty minutes before he was shown a red card. In his second league start for Donegal Mullins was sent onto the pitch to mark Brian Fenton (whom he was familiar with from playing against Raheny with St Vincents) in a game against Dublin at Croke Park; Mullins was substituted after 26 minutes.

He appeared as a late substitute for Niall O'Donnell against Kildare in Ballyshannon and was also a second-half substitute for Leo McLoone in the away match against Monaghan.

Mullins did not feature at all on the field of play during the 2018 Ulster Senior Football Championship, which Donegal won. However, he received a medal. Shortly after Donegal's season ended, Mullins sustained two broken ribs in a club game.

He linked up again with Donegal ahead of the 2019 season. Bonner suggested he return to his club to rediscover his form. Mullins left.

Mullins has since expressed the wish to play for Donegal again.

== Personal life ==
He lives in the coastal suburban settlement of Portmarnock.

Mullins Senior was displeased that Mullins Jnr chose to represent Donegal over Dublin. Mullins Jnr said: "People thought I lived in Donegal a few years and that I was using the county for a chance to play county football, but that couldn't be any further from the truth. Although the accent, and I'm living, working, playing down here [in Dublin], I'd be in Donegal as much as possible".

== Honours ==
Donegal

- Ulster Senior Football Championship: 2018

St Vincent's

- All-Ireland Senior Club Football Championship: 2013–14

Individual

- Dublin club footballer of the year: ?
