= Dungiven Castle =

19th century castle in County Londonderry, Northern Ireland

Coordinates: 54.9248°N 6.9210°W

- Northern Ireland
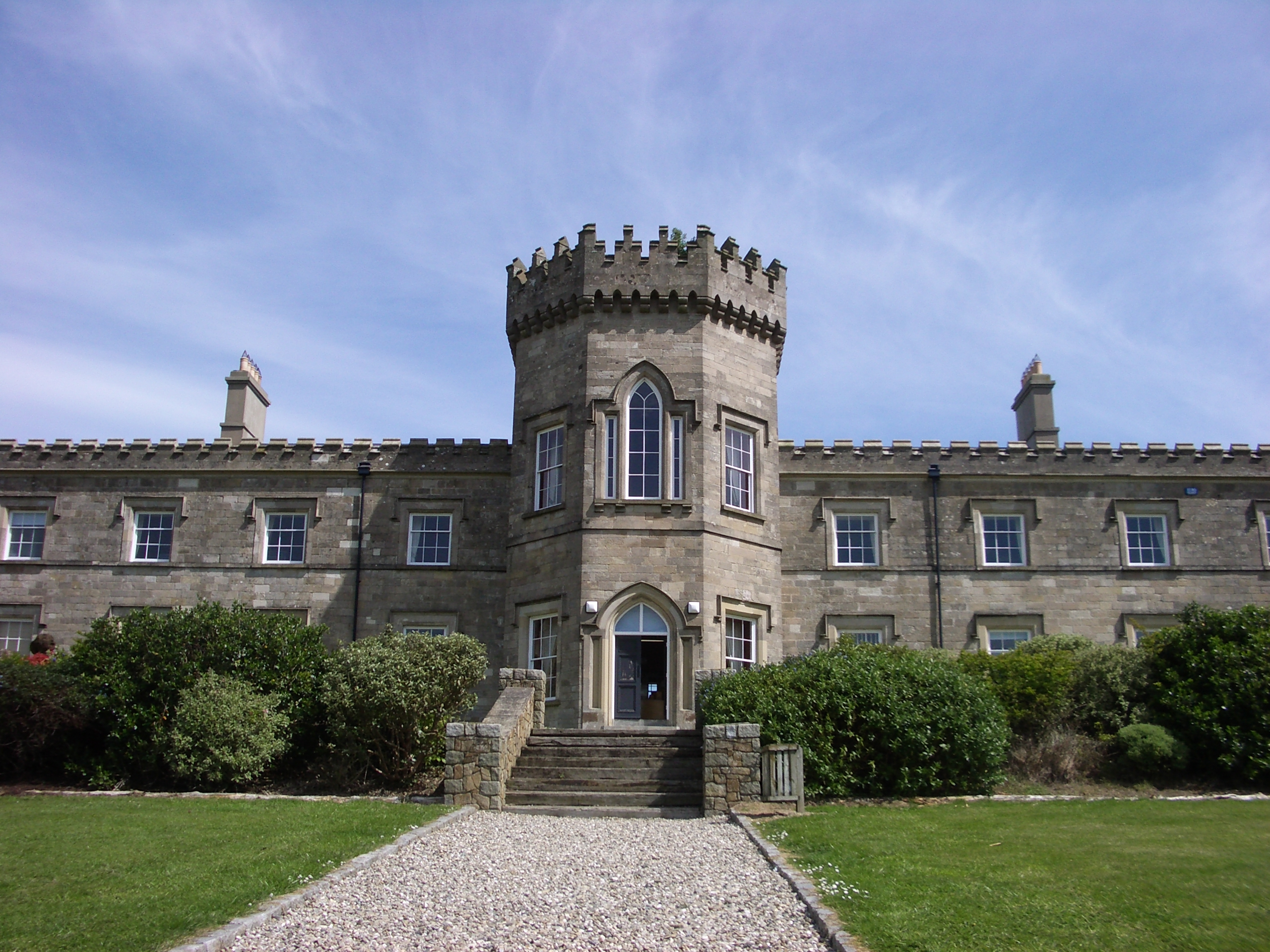

Site information
- Type: Castle
- Open to the public: Yes

Site history
- Materials: Stone

Dungiven Castle is a 19th century castle in Dungiven, County Londonderry, Northern Ireland.

== Plantation of Ulster ==
In 1610 James I ordered the Great Twelve Livery Companies to undertake the settlement, or plantation, of the Ulster counties of Londonderry and Tyrone. Of the livery companies, the Great Twelve Livery Companies are:

The lands to be settled were divided into lots. The Skinners' Company drew lot number 12. Its lands came to be known as the Manor of Pellipar. They, in turn, leased their estate to Sir Edward Doddington in 1616 who built a castle in Dungiven of "22 foot broad, four stories high whereof some part of the walls were standing before; and is now by him well finished and slated". When Sir Edward died in 1618 the lease passed to his widow, Lady Doddington (née Beresford) who later married Sir Francis Cooke and on her death, she demised the Manor of Pellipar to Edward Carey, her grand-nephew. Captain Edward Carey constructed the basis for Dungiven Castle in the mid-17th century as a simple single-story courtyard castle. At this time, castles were falling out of favour so it could be viewed as a manor house with castle-like features. From 1696, the Carey family lived in this property. Edward's son, Henry Carey, got a new lease on 11 January 1742 at a rent of £500 following a down payment of £5,637. Only the bawn walls of it remain on the grounds of Dungiven Castle today. The Carey family continued to hold the estate throughout the rest of the 18th century until 1794, when Robert Ogilby, of Pellipar House, paid Carey £10,000 for his interest in the remainder of the lease before securing a new lease from the Skinners Company on a down payment of £25,000 and a yearly rent of £1,500 with a deposit of £10,000 as security for the rent.

== The Ogilbys ==
The Ogilvy clan suffered much in the service of the Stewart monarchs, supporting the Jacobite cause and fighting for the Stewart family in both 1715 and 1745. A regiment of Ogilvy's also took part in the Battle of Culloden in 1746. After the defeat, the chief of the Ogilvy clan escaped to France and entered royal service there. By this time, the title of Earl of Ogilvy had been tainted and it was not until 1896 that an Act of Parliament restored the earldom to the family.

Alexander's son, Robert Ogilby, a lessee of the estates of the Skinners Company, bought the lease of the Dungiven estate from the Careys in 1794 and built the castle which we see today on top of Carey’s castle which had been badly damaged in a fire between 1836 and his death in 1839. Robert Ogilby (1762-1839), of Pellipar House, Dungiven, wedded firstly, in 1782, Mary, daughter of John Marland, of Dublin; and secondly, in 1809, Joice, eldest daughter of James Scott, of Willsboro', County Londonderry. Whilst the structure had been completed prior to his death in 1839, the interior had not and his nephew, whom his estate passed to, had no interest in completing it. Upon his death, the Skinners Company resumed direct control and drew up plans to restore it, however they never advanced these and instead put the castle up for sale when it was again purchased by the Ogilby family.

== The McCloskeys ==
James McCloskey, an American, purchased Dungiven Castle from the Ogilbys in 1925 and converted it into four flats. which provided homes for a number of families. However during World War II, the Castle became the home for some of the troops from the second increment of the MAGNET force US Army. MAGNET was a code name for the movement of troops during the second world war with three infantry divisions, one armoured division, supporting service troops and air forces forming the original plan for the Northern Ireland Sub-Theatre consisting of approximately 158,700 men There was an American base on nearby Benbradagh. Following the Castles occupation by the US Army during the 2nd World War it was later used as a dance hall during the 1950s and 1960s, A new Castle Ballroom extension was added and soon attracted the top showbands to what became one of the top venues in the whole of Ireland. Joe Dolan, Tom Jones and the Dubliners were among some of the acts to take the stage here. This extension burned down in 2001.

In 1971, The Assembly of the Northern Irish People held its first meeting at the castle on the afternoon of October 26. This assembly was set up in protest at the then government sitting in Stormont. Its Chairman was Gerry Lennon and its President, John Hume

== Glenshane Community Development Limited ==
Following this mixed history, the castle fell into a state of disrepair. In the 1980s, The National Trust turned down the chance to purchase the building as the cost of restoration was estimated to be circa £500,000. Limavady Borough Council then purchased it for £45,000 in order to demolish it. A local pressure group fought these plans and got it graded as a B1-listed building which protected it statutorily from demolition. In 1989 Glenshane Community Development bought the lease from Limavady Borough Council, planning to redevelop the property. In consultation with the local community, it was agreed that budget accommodation was needed in order to support the local tourism industry. In addition to investing their own monies, they applied for funding from various bodies and were successful in their applications to the Heritage Lottery Fund, Limavady Borough Council and the International Fund for Ireland.

In March 2001 Dungiven Castle was re-opened to provide budget accommodation.

Following on from the Northern Ireland peace process, there was a demand for more upmarket accommodation and so Glenshane Community Development Limited sought proposals to meet this demand. In 2009 Dungiven Castle Boutique Hotel emerged after the Castle underwent redevelopment and redecoration. When this venture closed Glenshane Community Development let it to another two hoteliers before entering into conversations with Irish language activists in respect of the Castle's latest incarnation with it now housing the second Irish-language-medium secondary school in Northern Ireland and the first outside of Belfast, Gaelcholáiste Doire. The school welcomed its first intake of students in September 2015
