= The Troubles in Dungiven =

Incidents in Dungiven, Northern Ireland during the Troubles

The Troubles in Dungiven recounts incidents during, and the effects of the Troubles in Dungiven, County Londonderry, Northern Ireland.

In total, seven people were killed in or near Dungiven during the Troubles. Four were British Army soldiers, two were Royal Ulster Constabulary (RUC), and one was a civilian. The civilian, Francis McCloskey, was killed under disputed circumstances, with many blaming the RUC; all the other deaths were the responsibility of republican paramilitary groups, with the Irish Republican Army killing three soldiers and a RUC officer, and the Irish National Liberation Army killing one RUC officer and one soldier. Both RUC officers were Protestant; McCloskey was Roman Catholic.

== Francis McCloskey ==
McCloskey, who died on 14 July 1969 aged 67, is considered to be the first fatality of the Troubles. An elderly farmer, he was found unconscious on 13 July near the Dungiven Orange Hall following a police baton charge against a crowd who had been throwing stones at the hall. Witnesses later said they had seen police batoning a figure in the doorway where McCloskey was found, although police claimed he had been unconscious before the baton charge and may have been hit with a stone. He was taken to hospital, where he died the next day. A later inquest found he suffered a brain hemorrhage as a result of a blow to the head.

== Other noteworthy incidents ==
The most lethal violence in the area occurred on 24 June 1972, when three British Army soldiers were killed by an IRA landmine while on patrol in Crebarkey, near Dungiven.
