= Geraldine Keegan =

Northern Irish headteacher and academic

Dame Geraldine Keegan (born 1941) is a Northern Irish former headteacher, former teacher and former academic.

== Background ==
Keegan was born in January 1941. Keegan spent at least part of her childhood in Aghadowey, County Londonderry. She attended Thornhill College, St Mary’s University College, Belfast, the University of Ulster, the University of Warwick and the University of Manchester.

== Career ==
Keegan began her teaching career as a teacher of history, English and music. As of 1982, Keegan was Lecturer in Education at St Mary's Training College, Belfast.

In 1987, Keegan became the headteacher of St Mary's College, Derry. She served as headteacher of the school until 2006. While Keegan was headteacher of St Mary's College, Derry, pupils' examination results improved considerably. As of 2000, the school was noted for creating cross-community links. As of 2003, the school's pupils achieved much higher grades in their exams than comparable schools, and the school had received several awards for its curriculum and the European Quality award. In a 2004 interview, Keegan described how members of the local community were volunteering to be classroom helpers at the school, and described the school's extensive extracurricular offering to pupils. During Keegan's time in charge of St Mary's College, Derry, the school received the award twice, and as of 2008 the school was the only public sector body to have received the award twice.

Following Keegan's retirement from the headship of St Mary's College, Derry, she continued to speak at conferences around the world.

In 1997, Keegan took up the position of pro-vice-chancellor of Ulster University. In 2002, she became a Visiting Professor at the University.

Keegan's holding of positions within larger education-related bodies has included several senior positions. As of 2003, she was a member of the Board of Investors in People UK. She is a member of the Council for Catholic Maintained Schools in Northern Ireland. As of 2012, she was a member of the Board of National Museums and Galleries of Northern Ireland. As of 2013, she was a member of the advisory committee of Talent Tribe.

== Honours ==
Keegan was awarded an OBE in 1995 for her services to education. In 2000, she was elevated to Dame Commander of the Order of the British Empire.

In 2006, Dame Geraldine received an honorary doctorate from Ulster University.
