= John Eddie Mullan =

Derry Gaelic footballer

Personal information
- Born: 27 April 1923 Galvin (outside Dungiven), County Londonderry, Northern Ireland
- Died: 14 December 2008 (aged 85)

Sport
- Sport: Gaelic football
- Position: Forward
Clubs
- Years: Club
- 1939–1942 1943 1944 1945–1957: Drumsurn; Glenullin; Magilligan; Dungiven
Club titles
- Derry titles: 2
Inter-county
- Years: County
- 19xx–1955: Derry
Inter-county titles
- NFL: 1

John Eddie Mullan (27 April 1923 – 14 December 2008) was a Gaelic footballer who played for the Derry county team in the 1940s and 1950s. He was part of the first Derry side to win the National Football League and also won two Dr McKenna Cups and three Dr Lagan Cups with the county.

For most of his career he played club football for St Canice's Dungiven and won two Derry Championships with the club.

Mullan has been described as "one of Derry's greatest forwards" and one of Derry's best ever players.

== Personal life ==
Mullan was born in the townland of Galvin, between Dungiven and Drumsurn on 27 April 1923. In the latter half of his life he was a publican in Portrush. He died peacefully on 14 December 2008 at his home in Portrush, County Antrim at the age of 85.

== Playing career ==
=== Inter-county ===
John Eddie Mullan was a permanent feature on Derry teams throughout the 1940s and 1950s and was full forward when Derry won the county's first National Football League title in 1947, defeating Clare in the final at Croke Park. He scored 1-01 in that game (1 goals and 1 point—each goal equals 3 points; 1 x 3 + 1 = 4 points, see GAA scoring rules).

He also won two Dr McKenna Cup medals (1947 and 1954) and three Dr Lagan Cup medals with Derry. A particularly memorable game was a 1951 McKenna Cup game against Fermanagh in which he scored 3-05. His last county game was against Tyrone in the 1955 Ulster Senior Football Championship.

=== Club ===
Mullan started out his football career with Drumsurn in 1939, where he played for a couple of years. He played for Glenullin in 1943 and Magilligan in 1944, before joining Dungiven in 1945, where he spent the rest of his career. With Dungiven he won Derry Senior Football Championships in 1947 and 1951. Mullan's last game for the club came in the 1957 North Derry Championship final against Ballerin.

== Honours ==
=== County ===
- National Football League:
  - Winner (1): 1947
- Ulster Senior Football Championship:
  - Runner up: 1955
- Dr McKenna Cup:
  - Winner (2): 1947, 1954
- Dr Lagan Cup:
  - Winner (3): 19xx, 19xx, 19xx

=== Club ===
- Derry Senior Football Championship:
  - Winner (2): 1947, 1951

Note: The above lists may be incomplete. Please add any other honours you know of.
