= Aloysius McVeigh =

Irish artist, iconographer and teacher

Sister Aloysius McVeigh, R.S.M., (April 10, 1923 – December 25, 2008) was an artist, iconographer and teacher. She was from Dungiven, County Londonderry, Northern Ireland.

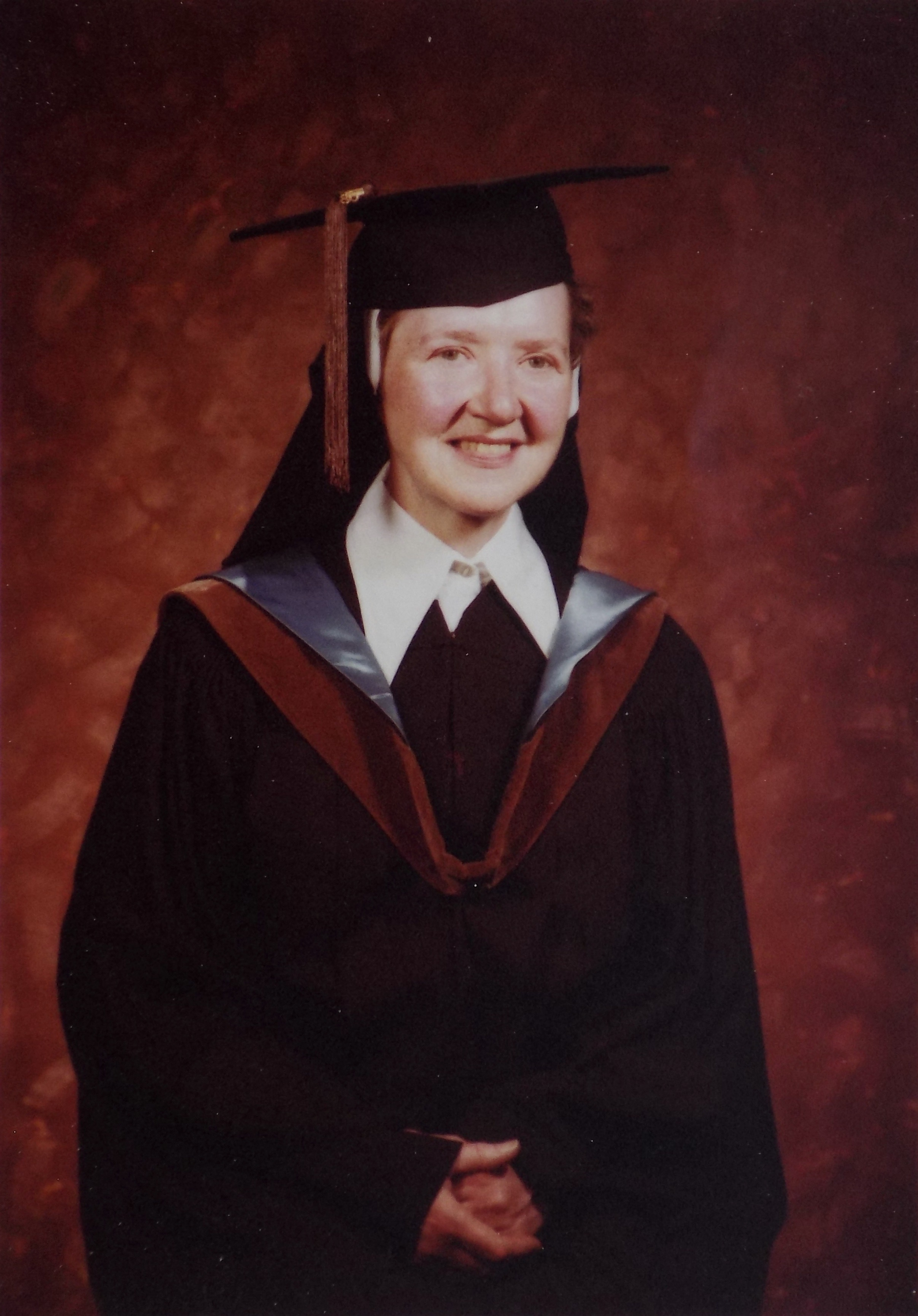
Sister Aloysius McVeigh wearing her MFA graduation robes, 1980.

Bridie entered the Sisters of Mercy convent in Derry in 1940, taking the religious name Aloysius in 1943. She taught art in several schools in the city. She was most noted for the 20 years she taught at St Mary's College, Derry. Initially this was an art teacher and then subsequently as principal. After studying painting and obtaining a Master of Fine Arts degree in 1980 from the Yale School of Art, Yale University, she returned to Belfast, where she taught art at St Mary's University College.

Sr. Aloysius was a founding member of the Association of Irish Iconographers. She stated that her iconography is an act of prayer. She is buried at St. Patrick's Roman Catholic Church alongside family members in Dungiven.

There is an Annual Sister Aloysius Religious Art competition in her honour. It is open to young people who are studying Art and Design at GCSE and A Level in schools in the Roman Catholic Derry Diocese.

There is a tribute to Sr. Aloysius McVeigh in the Winding Roe magazine Edition 8, 2009.

== Works in public places ==
- Trinity, Thornhill Parish Chapel, Culmore Road, Derry, Northern Ireland 1988
- Our Lady of the Sign (Stained Glass Window) Blessed Sacrament Chapel, Letterkenny, County Donegal, Northern Ireland 1988
- Our Lady of Perpetual Succour, Castlefin Church, County Tyrone, Northern Ireland 1989
- St Patrick, Parish Church, Greencastle, County Tyrone, Northern Ireland 1989
- Mother of Perpetual Succour, Parish Church, Clogher, County Tyrone, Northern Ireland 1989
- Stations of the Cross, Rosslea Parish Church, County Fermanagh, Northern Ireland 1990
- Mother of Perpetual Succour, Castlederg Church, County Tyrone, Northern Ireland 1990
- Mother of Perpetual Succour, Basilica in Lough Derg, County Donegal, Ireland 1991
- Crucifixion Cross, Poor Clare Monastery, Clifden Street, Belfast, County Antrim, Northern Ireland 1992
- Annunciation, Psychiatric Hospital, Limerick City, Ireland 1993
- Our Lady of Mercy, Mercy International Centre, 64 Lr. Baggot St., Dublin 2, Ireland 1993
- Christ, Source of Life, Pantocrator. Coolaney Parish Church, Coolaney, County Sligo, Ireland 1993
- Queen of All Saints, All Saints Parish Church, Newtowncunningham, County Donegal, Ireland 1995
- Pantocrator, St, Catherine's Nursing Home, Culmore Road, Derry, Northern Ireland 1995
- Mother of Perpetual Succour, Church of the Irish Martyrs, Letterkenny, County Donegal, Ireland 1996
- Baptism of Our Lord, Church of the Immaculate Conception, Strabane, County Tyrone, Northern Ireland 1996
- St Brendan, the Navigator, Church of Our Lady & St Brendan, Ireland 1996
- St Kevin, Glendalough Parish Church, Glendalough, County Wicklow, Ireland 1998
- St Coca, Parish Church of St Coca, Kilcock, County Kildare, Ireland 1999
- Lorcan O Toole, Glendalough Parish Church, Glendalough, County Wicklow, Ireland 1999
- St Gabriel, Linsfort Retreat House, Linsfort, County Donegal, Ireland 2001
- Nativity, Church of the Nativity, Poleglass, Belfast, 2001
- St Brigid, St Brigid's Parish Church, Kildare, County Kildare, Ireland 2001
- St Michael, All Saints Parish Church, Newtowncunningham, County Donegal, Ireland 2004
- St Michael, Linsfort Retreat House, Linsfort, County Donegal, Ireland 2005
- The Mercy Window, The Playhouse, 5-7 Artillery St, Derry, Northern Ireland. Unveiled posthumously, 2009

Works with no verified date -

- St John Payne, St John Payne Parish Church, Greenstead, Colchester, England.
- Stations of the Cross (14 Paintings), Our Lady of Lourdes Church Stations of the Cross at 11 Steelstown Road, Derry, BT48 8EU.
- Our Lady of Derry Private Collection, Drogheda, Co. Louth. Ireland. (1971 aprox).
- Star of the Sea Painting, Star of the Sea Church, Malin Head, Co. Donegal
- Portrait of John Colgan, Sacred Heart Church, Carndonagh, Co. Donegal, Ireland.
