= Frances Molloy =

Novelist and short story writer from Northern Ireland

- Born: 12 January 1947
- Died: 28 March 1991 (aged 44)

Ann Brady (née McGill; wrote as Frances Molloy) (12 January 1947 – 28 March 1991), was a novelist and short story writer from Northern Ireland.

== Biography ==
Born in 1947 in Dungiven, Northern Ireland, Ann McGill left school when she was just fifteen. She got a job working in a factory but left to become a nun. On later leaving the convent, she moved to Great Britain where she married Gerard Brady. They had two children. Adopting the pseudonym of "Frances Molloy" in her writing career, her biggest work was No Mate for the Magpie (1985). Although not a direct autobiography, it was based on Molloy's own life and experiences of growing up in Northern Ireland. The story focuses on Ann Elizabeth McClone, and is narrated by her in a Derry dialect. In 1971 Molloy and her husband moved back to Northern Ireland for two years, later settling at Lancaster, Lancashire. She died of a stroke on 28 March 1991.

Over the course of her career, Molloy wrote a play with Ruth Hooley and Nell McCafferty, and contributed short stories to various British magazines.

== Bibliography ==
- No Mate for the Magpie (1985)
- The Last Thing
- An Irish Fairy Tale ( 1985)
- Women are the Scourge of the Earth ( 1989)
