= Gaelcholáiste Dhoire =

Location
- Dungiven, County Londonderry, BT47 4LF; Northern Ireland; 54.9248°N 6.9212°W

Information
- School type: Irish Medium
- Opened: 2015
- School board: Education Authority (Western)
- Principal: Diarmaid Ua Bruadair
- Staff: 33
- Gender: Co-educational
- Age: 11 to 19
- Enrollment: 400 approx
- Sports: Gaelic Football, Hurling, Camogie, Basketball, Table Tennis
- Website: gaelcholaistedhoire.com

The Gaelcholáiste Dhoire is a multi-denominational, 11–19, all-ability, coeducational, Irish-medium, post-primary school in Dungiven, County Londonderry, Northern Ireland. It is located inside Dungiven Castle.

== History ==
The college was established in 2015. It is the second Irish medium post-primary school to be established in Northern Ireland. In 2012, before planning and purchasing of land for the school in Dungiven, Diarmaid Ua Bruadair (Principal of Gaelcholáiste Dhoire) and his colleagues reportedly tried to purchase land from the then-recently deestablished Maghera High School, which had closed in 2009, however this fell through.

== Academics ==
The college offers instruction in a total of 16 subjects that meet the revised Northern Ireland Curriculum requirements at Key Stage 3: English, Irish, Mathematics, Science, History, Religion, French, ICT, Technology and Design, Home Economics, Physical Education, Art, Music, Drama and Learning for Life and Work. English is taught through the medium of English, and the 15 other subjects are delivered through the medium of Irish (the target language). The school also has just recently joined the Roe Valley Learning Community along with St Patrick's College Dungiven, St Mary's High School Limavady and the North West Regional College. Pupils from Gaelcholáiste Dhoire are given the choice to choose A Level subjects at any of these schools if the school itself can not offer the subject the students want to study. Students travel to and from these schools and are able to immerse themselves in subjects that would have not been available to them at Gaelcholáiste Dhoire.

== Sport ==
Initially, due to limited numbers, the school fielded teams consisting of both male and female students playing on the same team. In the 2016/17 school year, the school collaborated with nearby schools to form amalgamated teams such as Gleann na Ró, incorporating students from Gaelcholáiste Dhoire, St Patrick's College Dungiven and St Mary's High School, Limavady. In 2018/19, as enrollment increased, the school established its own teams across various sports, including Gaelic football, hurling, and camogie. They participate in Ulster Schools' GAA competitions. In 2021, the school started to feature in regular Ulster Schools' GAA fixtures, this only helped student interest and participation continue to grow rapidly across both boys’ and girls’ sports. In 2022, the school established its first Senior Hurling team as it had enough senior pupils to do so. Cian de Bhaldraithe's (a teacher in the school) influence extends beyond the classroom into the hurling field, where he has been pivotal in developing the school's hurling program alongside Conor Mac Alasdair of Slaughtneil. They first participated in the Casement Shield, which they won on their first try. This helped them gain promotion to the Casement Cup, the Senior B Hurling competition in Ulster Schools' GAA. They eased through the group stages and earned a spot in the semi final against, at the time holders, St. Mary's Grammar School. Gaelcholáiste Dhoire won the semi final and advanced to the final against Aquinas Diocesan Grammar School. Heroically, the Gaelcholáiste won this final by a scoreling of 2–11 to 0–11. This marked the first major sporting title in the school's history and it was seen as a landmark achievement, proving the school's growing strength in Gaelic games.

The college has been praised for its leadership and pupil achievements by the inspectors from the Education and Training Inspectorate.
