= St Mary's College, Derry =

Coordinates: 55.009°N 7.327°W

St. Mary's College, Derry

Location
- 35 Northland Road; Derry, BT48 0AN; Northern Ireland

Information
- Type: Secondary School
- Religious affiliation: Roman Catholic
- Established: 1959
- Local authority: Education Authority (Western)
- Principal: Brendan McGinn
- Staff: 90
- Gender: All-Female
- Age: 11 to 19
- Enrollment: 1000
- Colour
- Website: www.stmarysderry.com

St. Mary's College, opened in 1959, is an all-girls Catholic-maintained secondary school and Specialist Science School located in Derry, Northern Ireland. It attracts pupils from a wide catchment area, with an enrolment of nearly one thousand pupils aged 11–18 and a staff of 92.

The school was formerly situated in the heart of Creggan, but moved to a newly built campus on the Northland Road. St Cecilia's College moved to a newly built campus on the grounds of where St. Marys was formerly based in Creggan.

== History ==
It was announced in early around 2001 onwards that St. Marys and St Cecilia's College would compete for a new school in the grounds of the former Templemore Secondary school on the Northland Road. St. Marys got the grounds but St Cecilia's College is currently located in the old Templemore School while their new school is being rebuilt on Blighs Lane. Although it was first thought that the new school would be ready for 2007, this date has been changed to 2009.

The school has achieved much success throughout the world. It was the first school in the UK to receive three charter marks for excellence, the government's public service "gold medal". Dame Geraldine Keegan had been Principal of the school for many years but in 2006 Mrs Marie Lindsay a Science Teacher in the school became the new Principal and served as Principal until her retirement in August 2020. Following Mrs Lindsay’s retirement Brendan McGinn then Vice Principal served as Acting Principal until a newly appointed Principal is announced. In June 2021 it was announced that Mr Brendan McGinn had been appointed the first Male Principal of the school.

Notable alumnae and staff

- Bronagh Gallagher, (born 1972) singer and actress
- Aloysius McVeigh, (1923 – 2008) former teacher and principal.
