= Benbradagh =

Mountain in Northern Ireland

- Binn Bhradach
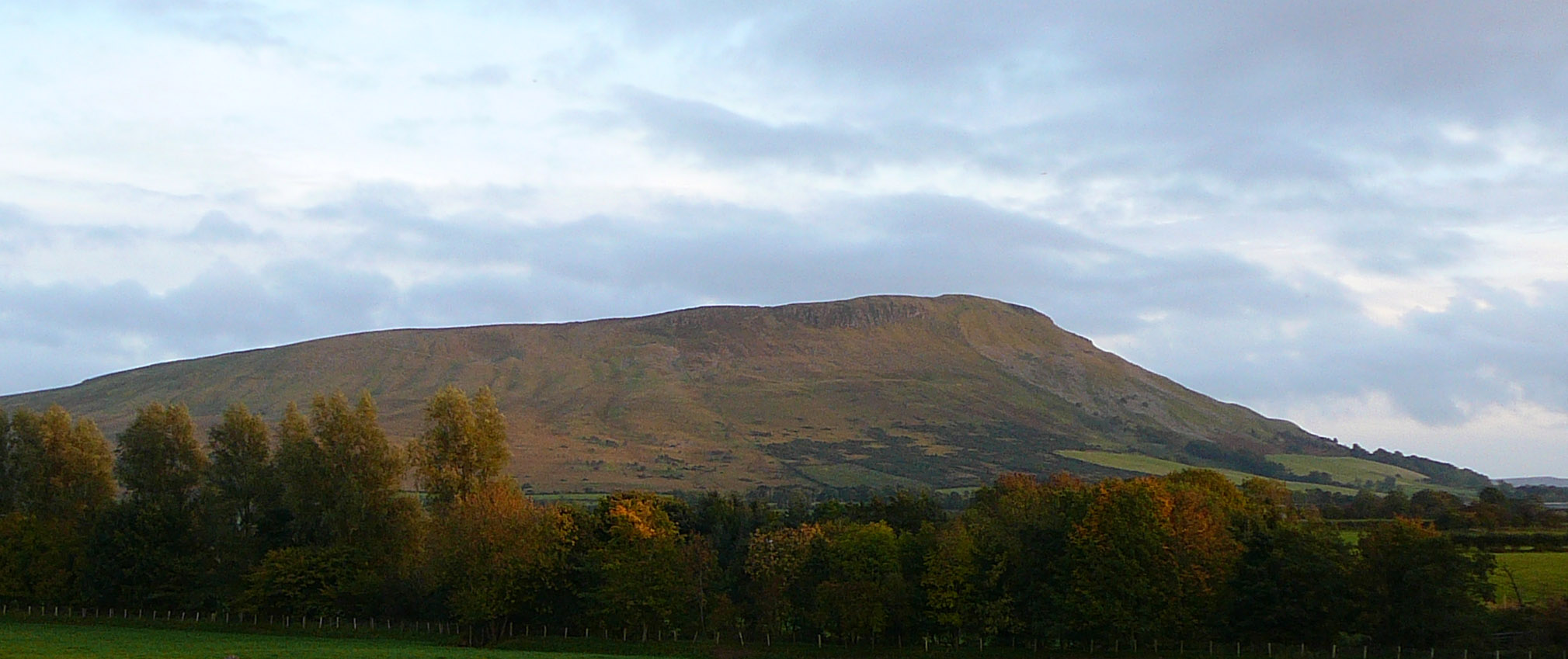
- Benbradagh as seen from Derryork, in October 2008

Highest point
- Elevation: 465 m (1,526 ft)
- Prominence: 171 m (561 ft)
- Coordinates: 54°56′40″N 6°52′27″W

Geography
- Location within Northern Ireland Location within island of Ireland Location within the United Kingdom
- Location: County Londonderry, Northern Ireland
- Parent range: Sperrin Mountains
- OSI/OSNI grid: C7219411337
- Topo map(s): OSNI Discoverer Series 13 The Sperrins (1:50000), OSNI Activity Map Sperrins (1:25000)

Benbradagh (from Irish Binn Bhradach 'treacherous peak') is a large hill near Dungiven in County Londonderry, Northern Ireland. It rises to 465 metres (1,526 ft) and is north of the Sperrin Mountains.

Benbradagh was used from the 1940s to the early 1970s as a United States Military communications base for its North Atlantic fleet. US forces also built underground stores for high explosives at Benbradagh. In the early 1980s, Col Buckley, of the Directorate of Military Intelligence (Ireland), believed the UK could use the facility to store nuclear weapons. Col Buckley complained that he did not have "the monitoring or surveillance systems" to confirm whether nuclear weapons were being kept there, but the British strongly denied having nuclear weapons in Northern Ireland.
