= Dungiven =

Town in County Londonderry, Northern Ireland

Coordinates: 54.928°N 6.925°W

Dungiven: Irish: Dún Geimhin
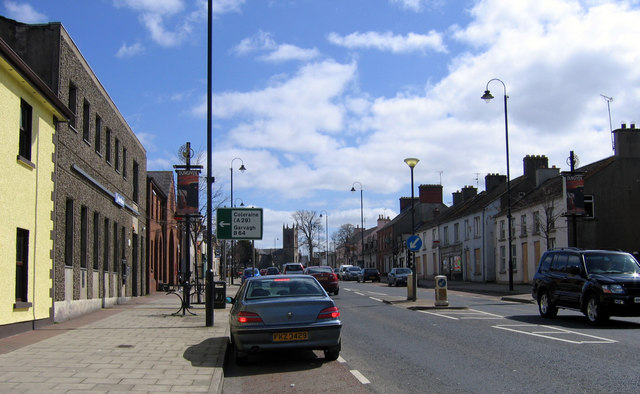

- Location within Northern Ireland
- Population: 3,346 (2021 census)
- Irish grid reference: C689024
  - Belfast: 53 miles (85 km)
- District: Causeway Coast and Glens
- County: County Londonderry
- Country: Northern Ireland
- Sovereign state: United Kingdom
- Post town: LONDONDERRY
- Postcode district: BT47
- Dialling code: 028
- Police: Northern Ireland
- Fire: Northern Ireland
- Ambulance: Northern Ireland
- UK Parliament: East Londonderry
- NI Assembly: East Londonderry

Dungiven (from Irish Dún Geimhin, meaning 'Gevin's fort') is a small town, townland and civil parish in County Londonderry, Northern Ireland. It is near the main A6 Belfast to Derry road, which bypasses the town. It lies where the rivers Roe, Owenreagh and Owenbeg meet at the foot of the 1,525 ft (465 m) Benbradagh. Nearby is the Glenshane Pass, where the road rises to over 1,000 ft (300 m). It had a population of 3,346 people in the 2021 census. It is within Causeway Coast and Glens district council area.

== History ==
There is evidence of settlement in the area for at least 1000 years. The Boviel Wedge cairn is located two miles east of Dungiven. Excavations in 1938 uncovered cremated bones from the Neolithic period, pottery sherds, scrapers, an arrowhead and a polished stone axe. There may have been an abbey in the area around 700AD. The Augustinian abbey of St Mary's was built in the 11th century. Its ruins contain the tomb of O'Cahan (Cooey na Gall O' Cahan), laid to rest in 1385. A thicket of thorn bushes hung with rags conceals a bullaun stone, visited for wart cures.

Between the 12th and 17th centuries the area was ruled by the Ó Catháin clan, one of the most influential clans in Ulster

The town sprang up around Dungiven Castle and the Church of Ireland (Anglican church), later spreading westwards along Chapel Road and Main Street towards the bridging point on the River Roe.

== Dungiven Priory ==
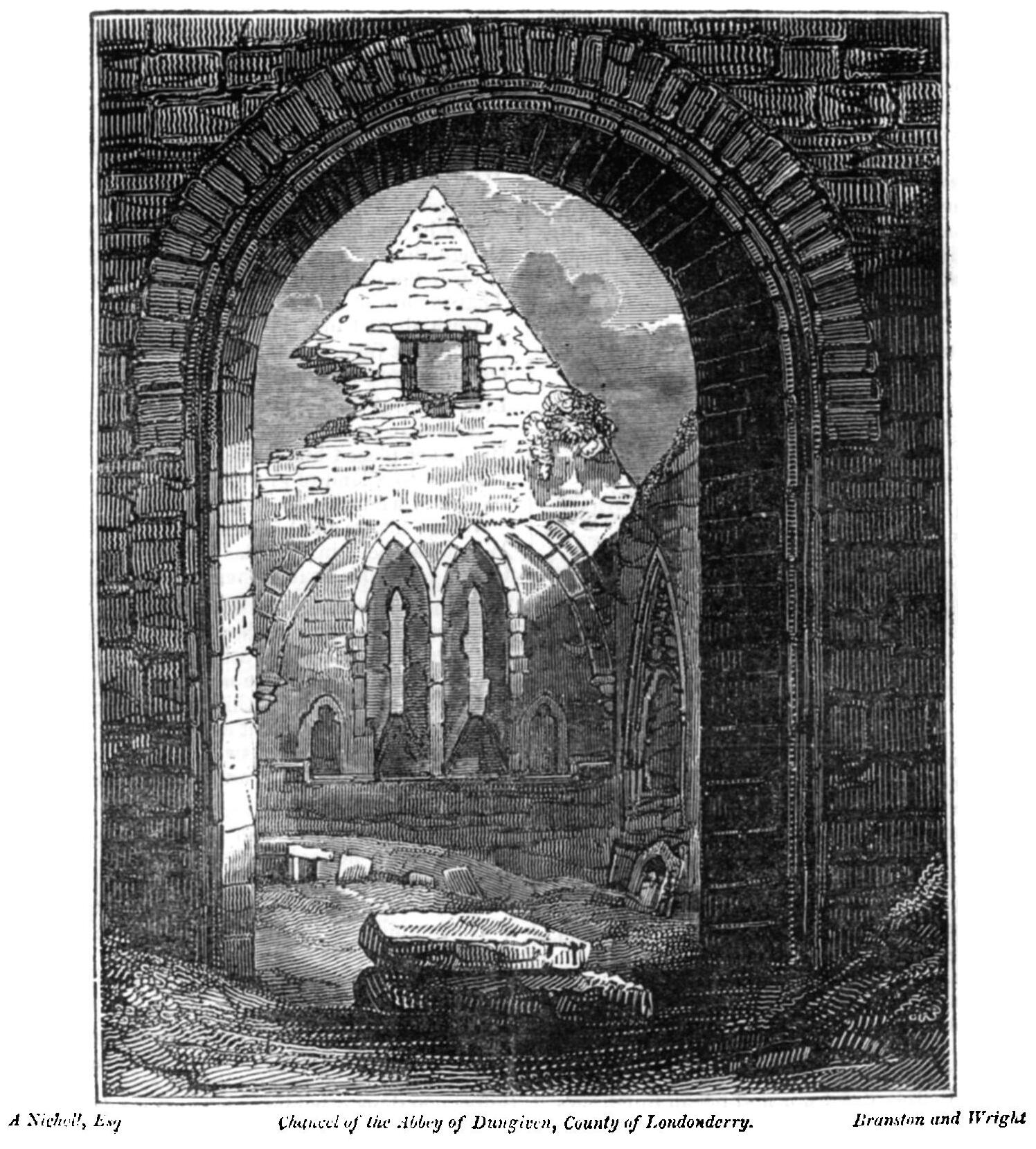
The Priory in 1832, Dublin Penny Journal

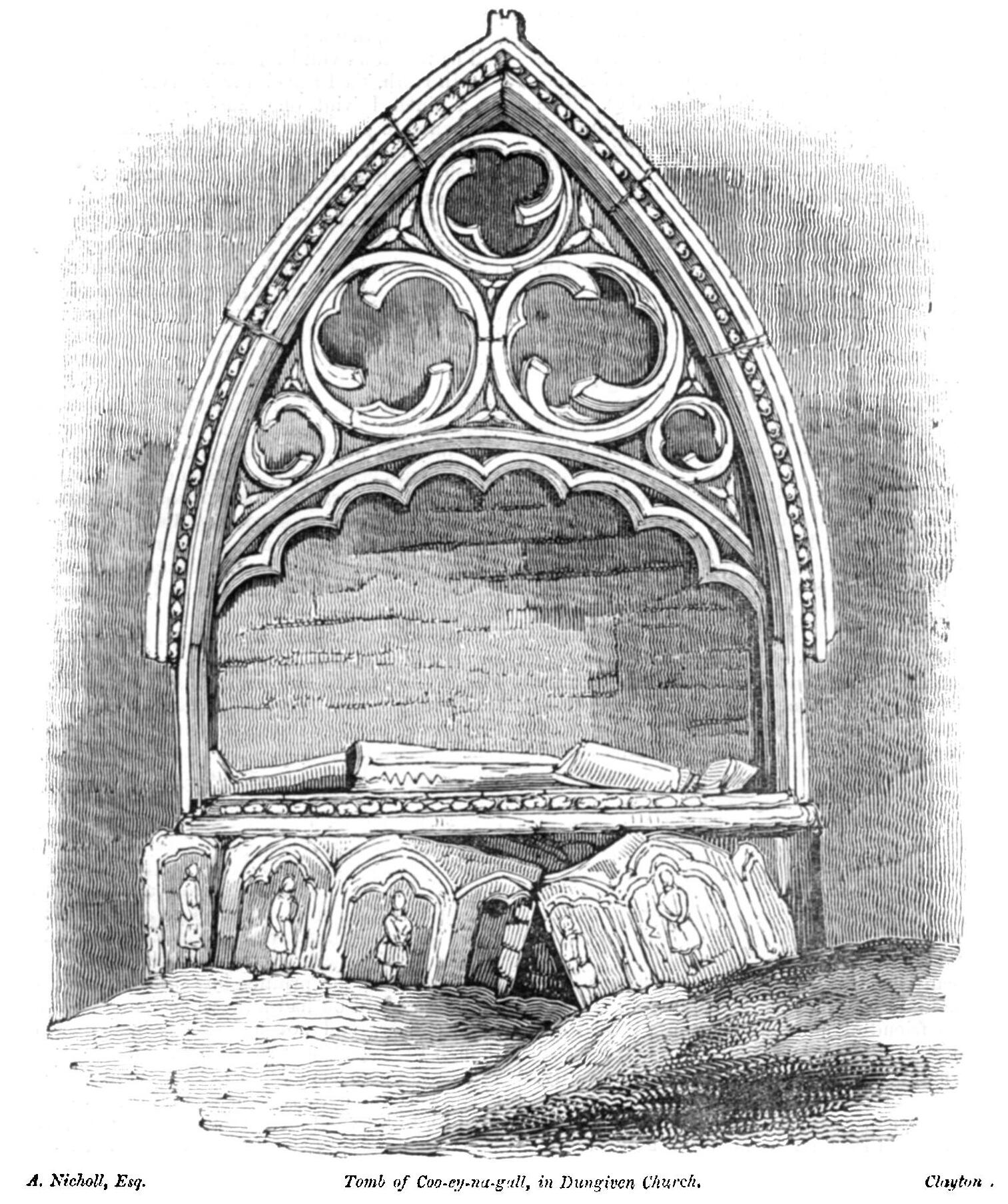
An O'Cahan tomb in the priory.

The Augustinian priory built in the 1100s stands on the foundations of earlier churches. St Nechtan died 679 may have established the first, and St Patrick the second in the 5th century.

== Politics ==
The town is part of the East Londonderry UK Parliamentary constituency. The MP for the constituency since 2001 has been Gregory Campbell of the DUP. The UK constituency is coterminous with the Northern Ireland Assembly constituency of the same name. The five MLAs elected in 2017 were 2 DUP, 1 independent unionist, 1 Sinn Féin and 1 SDLP. It forms part of the Benbradagh district electoral area of Causeway Coast and Glens Borough Council. In 2019 this area elected 3 Sinn Féin, 1 SDLP and 1 DUP councillors.

=== The Troubles ===
During The Troubles in Northern Ireland, seven people were killed in or near Dungiven in connection with the conflict, six of whom were members of the security forces. The one civilian, Francis McCloskey, was found beaten to death in disputed circumstances during street riots, in which the police were called to respond. He has sometimes been deemed as the first person killed in the last installment of the Troubles (1969-1997).

== Education ==
There are two secondary schools in the town, Gaelcholáiste Dhoire and St. Patrick's College. Located on Main Street and Curragh Road respectively. There are also two primary schools in the town, Gaelscoil Neachtain and St. Canice's Primary School. Gaelcholáiste Dhoire and Gaelscoil Neachtain are both co-educational, interdenominational Irish-medium secondary and primary schools.

== Sport ==
Gaelic games are the most popular sports in the area. St Canice's Dungiven is the local Gaelic football club; the team plays at O'Cahan Park and have won the Derry Senior Football Championship 7 times, and won the Ulster Senior Football Championship once, in 1997.

Kevin Lynch's is the local hurling club; they have won the Derry Senior Hurling Championship a record 22 times. The team plays at Kevin Lynch Park.

Dungiven Celtic F.C. is an association football club playing in the C&DL Premier League.

== Demography ==
=== 2021 census ===
On census day in 2021 (21 March 2021), there were 3,346 people living in Dungiven. Of these:

- 24.65% were aged under 16, 63.04% were aged between 16-65, and 12.31% were aged 66 or over.
- 51.02% of the population were female, and 48.98% were male.
- 94.32% were from a Catholic background, 2.93% were from a Protestant or other Christian background, 0.42% were from an 'other' religious background, and 2.33% did not adhere to or weren't from any religious background.
- 72.8% identified as Irish, 24.1% identified as Northern Irish, 5.9% identified as British, 3.08% identified as 'other'.
- 28.10% had some knowledge of the Irish language and .3.08% had some knowledge of Ulster Scots

=== 2011 census ===
According to the Northern Ireland Statistics and Research Agency (NISRA), on census day in 2011 (27 March 2011) there were 3,288 people living in Dungiven, an increase of 10% over the 2001 population of 2,993. Of these:

- 24.57% were aged under 16 and 10.55% were aged 65 and over
- 48.87% of the population were male and 51.13% were female
- 95.41% were from a Catholic background and 3.65% were from a Protestant or other Christian background
- 8.63% of people aged 16–74 were unemployed

== Transport ==
Dungiven sits beside the main A6 road and has road links to Derry (29 km to the west) and Limavady (13 km to the north). A bypass for Dungiven, which follows a route to the south west of the town, was originally marked-out in the 1973 Limavady Area Plan, and was opened to traffic in 2022.

Dungiven was the terminus of the Limavady railway, which closed in 1950. Dungiven railway station opened on 4 July 1883, closed for passenger traffic on 1 January 1933 and closed altogether on 3 July 1950.

== Rivers ==
The River Roe is a major river in Northern Ireland and the largest river in the town. The river can be seen at the western end of Dungiven at Dungiven Bridge. It starts up the Glenshane Pass and flows in a northwestern way towards the town and then north through Burnfoot and then Limavady.

The Owenbeg River is a large tributary to the Roe it starts near Feeny and flows into the river downstream from Buttermilk Bridge.

The Owenreagh River is also a major tributary which starts up in Banagher Glen and flows into the river downstream from the new A6 Bridge.

The Pellipar Burn is a small river or stream which flows through the heart of the town mainly a polluted urban stream and parts flowing underground in culverts. The burn can be seen below New Bridge beside the Church on New Street. it flows into the Roe a short distance downstream from Pellipar Bridge. The burn is named after Pellipar House.

The Derryware Burn is another small stream that flows at the northern end of the town this burn is around the same size as the Pellipar and flows into the River Roe above Pellipar House Estate.

== People ==
- Francis Brolly (1938-2020), Musician and Sinn Féin MLA for East Londonderry
- Joe Brolly (b. 1969), lawyer and member of Derry's 1993 All-Ireland winning team; won All Stars in 1996 and 1997
- Mary Dillon (b. 1964), folk singer
- Cara Dillon (b. 1975), folk singer
- Kevin Lynch (1956-1981), hunger striker who died in 1981; the Dungiven hurling team was renamed Kevin Lynch's Hurling Club for him after his death
- Paul McCloskey (b. 1979), professional boxer, former British and European light welterweight champion
- Brian McGilligan (b. 1963), member of Derry's 1993 All-Ireland winning team; won All Stars in 1987 and 1993
- Geoffrey McGonagle (b. 1974), former Derry dual player
- Jamie McGonigle (b.1996), professional footballer
- Kieran McKeever (b. 1968), member of Derry's 1993 All-Ireland winning team; won an All Star in 2000
- Sister Aloysius McVeigh (1923-2008), Artist, iconographer and teacher
- John Mitchel (1815-1875), a 19th-century Irish patriot who inspired the Young Ireland Movement, was born at Camnish, between Dungiven and Burnfoot; the Mitchel Park area is named for him
- Frances Molloy (1947-1991), novelist
- John Eddie Mullan (1923-2008), former Derry player
- Eoghan Quigg (b. 1992), musician, singer

== Popular culture ==
Dungiven is mentioned in the Brian Friel play Making History, as the place where Mabel Bagnel goes after the Siege of Kinsale.

'Banagher old church' is said to be the resting place of Saint Murrough O'Heaney. He is said to have tamed the dragon Paiste.

== See also ==
- List of civil parishes of County Londonderry
