= 2018 Dr McKenna Cup =

Tournament details
- Province: Ulster
- Year: 2018
- Sponsor: Bank of Ireland
- Dates: 3 January — 17 February
- Teams: 12
- Defending champions: Tyrone

Winners
- Champions: Donegal (11th win)
- Manager: Declan Bonner
- Captain: Hugh McFadden

Runners-up
- Runners-up: Tyrone
- Manager: Mickey Harte
- Captain: Mattie Donnelly

Other
- Matches played: 21
- Website: Ulster GAA

The 2018 Dr McKenna Cup, known for sponsorship reasons as the Bank of Ireland Dr McKenna Cup, was a Gaelic football competition in the province of Ulster for county and university teams. It is normally held at the beginning of the GAA season.

Twelve teams take part – the nine Ulster county teams and three university teams, i.e. St Mary's University College, Belfast, Queen's University Belfast and Ulster University at Jordanstown (UUJ).

The draw took place on Thursday 30 November in the Balmoral Hotel, Belfast with the fixtures confirmed following a meeting of Comhairle Uladh CCC on Tuesday 5 December 2017.

After many postponements due to bad winter weather, the tournament ended on 17 February 2018 with Donegal the winners, ending a six-year Tyrone winning streak.

== Format ==
Group Stage

The twelve teams are drawn into three sections of four teams, with each section containing three county teams and one university team. Each team plays the other teams in its section once, earning 2 points for a win and 1 for a draw. A "scoring-average/points-ratio" method is used to determine the ranking of teams who are level on section points (as opposed to "scoring differential").

Knock-out Stage

The winners of the three sections and the best runner-up compete in the semi-finals with the two winners meeting in the final.

== Group stage ==
=== Section A ===
Pos	Team	Pld	W	D	L	PF	PA	PR	Pts	Qualification
1	Tyrone	3	3	0	0	79	38	2.079	6	Advance to semi-final
2	St Mary's	3	1	0	2	46	49	0.939	2	
3	Antrim	3	1	0	2	55	71	0.775	2	
4	Cavan	3	1	0	2	41	63	0.651	2	

Updated to match(es) played on 14 January 2018. Source: Ulster GAA

3 January 2018 Round 1	Tyrone	4-20 (32) – (17) 2-11	Antrim	Armagh
8:00pm		(HT: 1-10 – 0-04)		Venue: Athletic Grounds
				Referee: Enda McFeely (Donegal)

3 January 2018 Round 1	Cavan	0-15 (15) – (12) 0-12	St. Mary's	Cavan
8:00pm		(HT: 0-05 – 0-08)		Venue: Breffni Park 3G
				Referee: Kevin Faloon (Down)

7 January 2018 Round 2	Antrim	4-11 (23) – (19) 2-13	Cavan	Belfast
2:00pm		(HT: 2-06 – 1-06)		Venue: Woodlands
				Referee: Joseph Corcoran (Fermanagh)

7 January 2018 Round 2	Tyrone	1-16 (19) – (14) 1-11	St. Mary's	Coalisland
2:15pm		(HT: 1-07 – 1-05)		Venue: Fr Peter Campbell Park
				Referee: Barry Cassidy (Derry)

10 January 2018 Round 3	Cavan	0-07 (07) – (28) 2-22	Tyrone	Cavan
8:00pm		(HT: 0-01 – 0-11)		Venue: Breffni Park
				Referee: Niall Cullen (Fermanagh)

10 January 2018 Round 3	Antrim	0-15 (15) – (20) 4-08	St. Mary's	Belfast
8:00pm		(HT: 0-04 – 1-04)		Venue: Woodlands
				Referee: Paul Faloon (Down)

=== Section B ===
Pos	Team	Pld	W	D	L	PF	PA	PR	Pts	Qualification
1	Armagh	3	2	1	0	47	38	1.237	5	Advance to semi-final
2	Derry	3	2	0	1	50	52	0.962	4	
3	Down	3	1	0	2	46	44	1.045	2	
4	Ulster University	3	0	1	2	40	49	0.816	1	

Updated to match(es) played on 14 January 2018. Source: Ulster GAA

3 January 2018 Round 1	Down	0-13 (13) – (18) 2-12	Armagh	Newry
8:00pm		(HT: 0-05 – 0-09)		Venue: Páirc Esler
				Referee: Sean Laverty (Antrim)

3 January 2018 Round 1	Derry	2-14 (20) – (19) 3-10	Ulster University	Derry
8:00pm		(HT: 1-06 – 0-08)		Venue: Celtic Park
				Referee: Kieran Mooney (Down)

14 January 2018 Round 2	Armagh	1-15 (18) – (13) 0-13	Derry	Armagh
2:00pm		(HT: 1-08 – 0-05)		Venue: Athletic Grounds
		Report		Referee: Martin McNally (Monaghan)
Note: This game was originally scheduled to take place on 7 January, but was postponed due to a frozen pitch.

14 January 2018 Round 2	Down	1-14 (17) – (09) 0-09	Ulster University	Burren
2:00pm				Venue: St. Mary's Park
				Referee: Karol Doherty (Antrim)
Note: This game was originally scheduled to take place on 7 January, but was postponed due to a frozen pitch.

10 January 2018 Round 3	Derry	1-14 (17) – (16) 2-10	Down	Derry
8:00pm		(HT: 0-08 – 2-07)		Venue: Celtic Park
		Report		Referee: Anthony Marron (Monaghan)

10 January 2018 Round 3	Armagh	0-12 (12) – (12) 1-09	Ulster University	Armagh
8:00pm		(HT: 0-04 – 1-06)		Venue: Athletic Grounds
				Referee: Conor Dourneen (Cavan)

=== Section C ===
Pos	Team	Pld	W	D	L	PF	PA	PR	Pts	Qualification
1	Fermanagh	3	3	0	0	46	37	1.243	6	Advance to semi-final
2	Donegal	3	2	0	1	63	41	1.537	4	Advance to semi-final (best runner-up)
3	Monaghan	3	1	0	2	50	53	0.943	2	
4	Queen's University Belfast	3	0	0	3	25	53	0.472	0	

Updated to match(es) played on 14 January 2018. Source: Ulster GAA

3 January 2018 Round 1	Donegal	2-15 (21) – (06) 0-06	Queen's University Belfast	Ballybofey
8:00pm		(HT: 2-05 – 0-02)		Venue: Páirc MacCumhaill
				Referee: James Lewis (Fermanagh)

3 January 2018 Round 1	Fermanagh	2-11 (17) – (12) 0-12	Monaghan	Enniskillen
8:00pm		(HT: 0-05 – 0-06)		Venue: Brewster Park
				Referee: Sean Hurson (Tyrone)

7 January 2018 Round 2	Fermanagh	1-10 (13) – (12) 1-09	Queen's University Belfast	Enniskillen
2:15pm		(HT: 0-06 – 1-04)		Venue: Brewster Park
				Referee: Stephen Campbell (Tyrone)

14 January 2018 Round 2	Monaghan	0-19 (19) – (29) 4-17	Donegal	Clones
2:00pm		(HT: 0-10 – 2-09)		Venue: St Tiernach's Park
		Report		Referee: Joe McQuillan (Cavan)

10 January 2018 Round 3	Monaghan	2-13 (19) – (07) 0-07	Queen's University Belfast	Castleblayney
8:00pm		(HT: 2-08 – 0-02)		Venue: St Mary's Park
				Referee: Pat Clarke (Cavan)

10 January 2018 Round 3	Donegal	1-10 (13) – (16) 1-13	Fermanagh	Ballybofey
8:00pm		(HT: 1-05 – 0-05)		Venue: Páirc MacCumhaill
				Referee: Dan Mullan (Derry)

=== Ranking of second-placed teams ===
Pos	Grp	Team	Pld	W	D	L	PF	PA	PR	Pts	Qualification
1	C	Donegal	3	2	0	1	63	41	1.537	4	Advance to semi-final
2	B	Derry	3	2	0	1	50	52	0.962	4	
3	A	St. Mary's	3	1	0	2	46	49	0.939	2	

Updated to match(es) played on 14 January 2018. Source: Ulster GAA

== Knock-out Stage ==
=== Semi-finals ===
14 January 2018 Semi-Final	Fermanagh	0-04 (04) – (08) 0-08	Tyrone	Enniskillen
2:00pm		(HT: 0-03 – 0-06)		Venue: Brewster Park
	Pts: Ryan Jones, Barry Mulrone, Aidan Breen, Seamus Quigley (f)	Report	Pts: Darren McCurry (3, 3f), Conor McAliskey (2, 1f), Richard Donnelly, Declan McClure, Ronan O'Neill	Referee: Ciaran Branagan (Down)

20 January 2018 Semi-Final	Donegal	0-20 (20) – (13) 1-10	Armagh	Derry
6:00pm		(HT: 0-09 – 1-06)		Venue: Celtic Park
	Pts: Patrick McBrearty (8, 3f), Darach O'Connor (3, 1f), Niall O’Donnell (3), Stephen McBrearty (3), Nathan Mullins (2), Ciarán Thompson	Report	Gls: Eamon McGeown; Pts: Eamon McGeown (3), Michael Stevenson (3, 1 '45), Stephen Sheridan, Edward English, Conor White, Oisin Mac Íomhair	Referee: Niall McKenna (Monaghan)

=== Final ===
17 February 2018
6:00pm
Final

Report

Donegal	1-16 (19) – (15) 1-12	Tyrone
(HT: 1-09 – 1-06)
Gls: M McElhinney; Pts: N O'Donnell (3), M Murphy (3, 2f), M Reilly (2, 1f), D Ó Baoill (2), P Brennan (2), M McElhinney, F McGlynn, O MacNiallais, C Thompson		Gls: H Loughran; Pts: R O'Neill (6, 5f), H Loughran, C McCarron, K McGeary, C McCann, D McClure, D McCurry

Athletic Grounds, Armagh
Referee: Barry Cassidy (Derry)
Attendance: 4,287
