= 2018 National Football League (Ireland) =

Gaelic football competition

League details
- Dates: 27 January – 1 April 2018
- Teams: 32

League champions
- Winners: Dublin (13th win)
- Captain: Stephen Cluxton
- Manager: Jim Gavin

League runners-up
- Runners-up: Galway
- Captain: Damien Comer
- Manager: Kevin Walsh

Other division winners
- Division 2: Roscommon
- Division 3: Armagh
- Division 4: Laois

The 2018 National Football League, known for sponsorship reasons as the Allianz National Football League, was the 87th staging of the National Football League (NFL), an annual Gaelic football tournament for Gaelic Athletic Association county teams. Thirty-one county teams from the island of Ireland, plus London, compete. Kilkenny do not participate.

The first six rounds in all four divisions were scheduled to have been played before 24 March 2018, allowing the final round seven matches to be played on that date. Due to poor winter weather, some fixtures in Division 2 (round 6) and Division 4 (rounds 5 and 6) had not been played by that date. The GAA decided to proceed with the final round seven matches in the four divisions before the completion of the earlier rounds. This decision proved controversial - for instance, in the rescheduled Division 2 match between Louth and Meath which was played on 31 March 2018, Meath needed to win to avoid relegation while Louth had nothing to play for as they were already relegated irrespective of the result. Meath beat Louth by 1-12 to 0-07, thereby ensuring that Down were relegated.

Eir Sport and TG4 provide live TV coverage of the league on Saturday nights and Sunday afternoons respectively. The highlights programmes are RTÉ2's League Sunday on Sunday evenings and TG4's GAA 2018 on Monday evenings.

The league concluded on 1 April 2018 with Dublin defeating Galway in the division 1 final. It was their fifth Division 1 title in six years.

== Format ==
=== League structure ===
The 2018 National Football League consists of four divisions of eight teams. Each team plays every other team in its division once, usually four home and three away or three home and four away. Two points are awarded for a win and one point for a draw.

Teams by Province and Division
| Province | Division 1 | Division 2 | Division 3 | Division 4 | Total |
|---|---|---|---|---|---|
| Connacht | 2 | 1 | 1 | 1 | 5 |
| Leinster | 2 | 2 | 4 | 3 | 11 |
| Munster | 1 | 3 | 0 | 2 | 6 |
| Ulster | 3 | 2 | 3 | 1 | 9 |
| Britain | 0 | 0 | 0 | 1 | 1 |
| Total | 8 | 8 | 8 | 8 | 32 |

=== Tie-breaker ===
If only two teams are level on league points -

- The team that won the head-to-head match is ranked first
- If this game was a draw, score difference (total scored minus total conceded in all games) is used to rank the teams
- If score difference is identical, total scored is used to rank the teams
- If still identical, a play-off is required

If three or more teams are level on league points, score difference is used to rank the teams.

=== Finals, promotions and relegations ===
==== Division 1 ====
The top two teams in Division 1 contest the National Football League final. The bottom two teams are relegated to Division 2.

==== Division 2, Division 3 & Division 4 ====
The top two teams in Divisions 2, 3 and 4 are promoted and contest the finals of their respective divisions. The bottom two teams in Divisions 2 and 3 are relegated.

== Division 1 ==
=== Division 1 table ===
Possible problem: 875 total for != 873 total against

| Pos | Team | Pld | W | D | L | PF | PA | PD | Pts | Qualification |
|---|---|---|---|---|---|---|---|---|---|---|
| 1 | Galway | 7 | 6 | 1 | 0 | 106 | 83 | +23 | 13 | Advance to Division 1 Final |
| 2 | Dublin | 7 | 5 | 1 | 1 | 131 | 99 | +32 | 11 | Advance to Division 1 Final |
| 3 | Monaghan | 7 | 5 | 0 | 2 | 106 | 100 | +6 | 10 | |
| 4 | Tyrone | 7 | 4 | 0 | 3 | 114 | 98 | +16 | 8 | |
| 5 | Kerry | 7 | 3 | 0 | 4 | 114 | 127 | −13 | 6 | |
| 6 | Mayo | 7 | 2 | 1 | 4 | 94 | 110 | −16 | 5 | |
| 7 | Donegal | 7 | 1 | 1 | 5 | 109 | 126 | −17 | 3 | Relegation to Division 2 |
| 8 | Kildare | 7 | 0 | 0 | 7 | 101 | 130 | −29 | 0 | Relegation to Division 2 |

Updated to match(es) played on 25 March 2018. Source: GAA.ie
Rules for classification: 1) League points 2) Where only two teams are level, the winner of the game between the two teams is ranked first 3) Scoring Difference 4) Highest Total Score For 5) A Play-Off.

=== Division 1 Rounds 1 to 7 ===
==== Round 1 ====
| Saturday, 27 January | Dublin | 2-17(23) – 2-10(16) | Kildare | Croke Park, Dublin |
| 7:00pm | Brian Fenton 1-3 Dean Rock 1-2 (0-2f), Colm Basquel 0-3, Brian Howard, Ciarán Kilkenny, Niall Scully 0-2 each, John Small, Bernard Brogan, Kevin McManamon 0-1 each | Report | Daniel Flynn 1-2, Luke Flynn 1-0, Eamonn Callaghan 0-3f, Kevin Felly 0-2f, Mark Donnellan (0-1f), Paul Cribbin, Neil Flynn (0-1f) 0-1 each | Referee: Conor Lane (Cork); Man of the Match: Brian Fenton (Raheny) |

| Sunday, 28 January | Kerry | 2-18 (24) – 3-14 (23) | Donegal | Fitzgerald Stadium, Killarney |
| 2:00pm | Seán O'Shea 0-7 (0-4f), Paul Geaney 1-2 (0-1 pen), Stephen O'Brien 1-1, Barry John Keane 0-2, Gavin Crowley, Ronan Shanahan, Micheál Burns, David Clifford (0-1f), Daithi Casey, Killian Spillane 0-1 each | Report | Paddy McBrearty 0-10 (0-8f), Odhran MacNiallais 1-2, Tony McCleneghan and Darach O'Connor 1-0 each, Jamie Brennan and Stephen McBrearty 0-1 each | Referee: Paddy Neilan (Roscommon); Man of the Match: Paddy McBrearty (Kilcar) |

| Sunday, 28 January | Monaghan | 0-12 (12) – 0-13 (13) | Mayo | St Tiernach's Park, Clones |
| 2:00pm | Conor McCarthy (0-2f) and Jack McCarron (0-2f) 0-3 each, Karl O'Connell, Niall Kearns, David Garland 0-2 each | Report | Evan Regan 0-5 (0-4f), Neil Douglas 0-4 (0-2f, 2 '45), Patrick Durcan 0-2, Eoin O'Donoghue and Andy Moran 0-1 each | Referee: David Gough (Meath); Man of the Match: Eoin O'Donoghue (Belmullet) |

| Sunday, 28 January | Galway | 1-09 (12) – 0-08 (08) | Tyrone | St Jarlath's Park, Tuam |
| 2:30pm | Damien Comer 1-2, Shane Walsh 0-4 (0-3f), Eamon Brannigan 0-2, Patrick Sweeney 0-1 | Report | Peter Harte (0-1f) and Conor McAliskey (0-1f) 0-2 each, Tiernan McCann, Mattie Donnelly, Cathal McShane, Ronan O'Neill (0-1f) 0-1 each | Referee: Ciaran Branagan (Down) |

==== Round 2 ====
| Saturday, 3 February | Mayo | 2-09 (15) – 1-15 (18) | Kerry | MacHale Park, Castlebar |
| 7:00pm | Diarmuid O'Connor 2-1 (1-0 pen), Jason Doherty 0-3f, Cillian O’Connor 0-2f, Barry Moran, Evan Regan (0-1f), Andy Moran (0-1f) 0-1 each | Report | Seán O'Shea 0-4 (1 '45), Gavin Crowley 1-0, Paul Geaney 0-3, Mícheál Burns and Barry John Keane 0-2, Paul Murphy, Barry O'Sullivan, David Clifford, Brendan O'Sullivan 0-1 each | Referee: Derek O'Mahoney (Tipperary); Man of the Match: Paul Murphy (Rathmore) |

| Saturday, 3 February | Tyrone | 1-11 (14) – 2-13 (19) | Dublin | Healy Park, Omagh |
| 7:00pm | Lee Brennan 0-6 (0-3f), Cathal McShane 1-1, Conor McAliskey 0-2, Peter Harte and Niall Sludden 0-1 each | Report | Ciarán Kilkenny 1-2, Dean Rock 0-4f, Colm Basquel 0-3 (0-1f), Eoghan O'Gara 1-0, Kevin McManamon 0-2, James McCarthy and Brian Fenton 0-1 each | Referee: Maurice Deegan (Laois); Man of the Match: Ciarán Kilkenny (Castleknock) |

| Sunday, 4 February | Kildare | 0-12 (12) – 1-10 (13) | Monaghan | St Conleth's Park, Newbridge |
| 2:00pm | Kevin Feely (0-3f), Paul Cribbin, Ben McCormack 0-3 each, Niall Kelly 0-2, Paddy Brophy 0-1 | Report | Conor McCarthy 1-1 (0-1f), Dessie Ward and Jack McCarron (0-1f) 0-2 each, Rory Beggan (0-1f), Kieran Duffy, Darren Hughes, Niall Kearns (0-1f), Conor McManus (0-1f) 0-1 each | Referee: Joe McQuillan (Cavan) |

| Sunday, 4 February | Donegal | 0-14 (14) – 1-12 (15) | Galway | O'Donnell Park, Letterkenny |
| 2:30pm | Paddy McBrearty 0-9 (0-6f), Stephen McBrearty 0-2, Ryan McHugh, Paul Brennan, Ciaran McGinley 0-1 each | Report | Shane Walsh 0-6 (0-4f), Eamonn Brannigan 1-0, Damien Comer 0-3, Johnny Heaney, Paul Conroy, Sean Armstrong 0-1 each | Referee: Padraig Hughes (Armagh) |

==== Round 3 ====
| Saturday, February 10 | Dublin | 0-20 (20) – 0-15 (15) | Donegal | Croke Park, Dublin |
| 7:00pm | Niall Scully and Colm Basquel (0-1f) 0-4 each, Brian Fenton, Ciarán Kilkenny, Paul Mannion (0-1f) 0-2 each, Eric Lowndes, Brian Howard, Paddy Andrews, Eoghan O'Gara, Ciaran Reddin, Paddy Small 0-1 each | Report | Paddy McBrearty 0-7 (0-3f), Ryan McHugh, Stephen McBrearty, Jamie Brennan 0-2 each, Mark McHugh and Ciarán Thompson 0-1 each | Attendance: 21,400; Referee: Joe McQuillan (Cavan); Man of the Match: Colm Basquel (Ballyboden St. Enda's) |

| Sunday, February 11 | Galway | 1-13 (16) – 0-11 (11) | Mayo | Pearse Stadium, Salthill |
| 2:00pm | | Report | | Attendance: 9,850; Referee: Anthony Nolan (Wicklow) |

| Sunday, February 11 | Kildare | 0-18 (18)– 1-16 (19) | Tyrone | St Conleth's Park, Newbridge |
| 2:00pm | | Report | | Referee: Paddy Neilan (Roscommon) |

| Sunday, February 18 | Monaghan | 1-13 (16) – 0-14 (14) | Kerry | Páirc Grattan, Inniskeen |
| 2:30pm | | Report | | Referee: Cormac Reilly (Meath) |

==== Round 4 ====
| Saturday, February 24 | Mayo | 0-12 (12) – 2-10 (16) | Dublin | MacHale Park, Castlebar |
| 7:00pm | Jason Doherty and Conor Loftus 0-3f each, Kevin McLoughlin 0-2, Rob Hennelly (0-1f), Lee Keegan, Stephen Coen, Andy Moran 0-1 each | Report | Dean Rock 0-6 (0-4f), Paul Mannion 1-1, Niall Scully 1-0, Ciarán Kilkenny 0-2, Brian Fenton 0-1 | Referee: Paddy Neilan (Roscommon); Man of the Match: Dean Rock (Ballymun Kickhams) |

| Saturday, February 24 | Monaghan | 0-15 (15) – 0-14 (14) | Tyrone | St Mary's Park, Castleblayney |
| 7:00pm |

| Sunday, February 25 | Donegal | 1-15 (18) – 3-07 (16) | Kildare | Fr Tierney Park, Ballyshannon |
| 2:00pm | | Report |

| Sunday, February 25 | Kerry | 0-14 (14) – 1-14 (17) | Galway | Austin Stack Park, Tralee |
| 2:30pm | | Report |

==== Round 5 ====
| Saturday, March 10 | Tyrone | 2-13 (19) – 1-10 (13) | Donegal | Healy Park, Omagh |
| 7:00 pm | Lee Brennan 0-5 (0-4f), Niall Sludden and Mark Bradley 1-1 each, Conor McAliskey 0-3f, Niall Morgan (0-1f), Cathal McShane, Peter Harte 0-1 each | Report | Odhran Mac Niallais 1-2, Michael Murphy 0-3f, Eoghan Bán Gallagher, Eamonn Doherty, Hugh McFadden, Mark McHugh, Stephen McBrearty 0-1 each | Attendance: 5,850; Referee: David Coldrick (Meath) |

| Sunday, March 11 | Galway | 0-17 (17) – 1-10 (13) | Monaghan | Pearse Stadium, Salthill |
| 12:30pm | Barry McHugh 0-5f, Damien Comer 0-3, Johnny Heaney, Paul Conroy, Adrian Varley 0-2 each, Shane Walsh, Eamonn Brannigan, Sean Armstrong (0-1f) 0-1 each | Report | Kieran Hughes 1-3, Conor McManus 0-4 (0-3f), Jack McCarron 0-2 (0-1f), Rory Beggan (1 '45) 0-1 | Referee: Barry Cassidy (Derry); Man of the Match: Sean Armstrong (Salthill-Knocknacarra) |

| Sunday, March 11 | Kildare | 1-12 (15) – 1-19 (22) | Mayo | St. Conleth's Park, Newbridge |
| 2:00pm | | Report | Aidan O'Shea 1-1, Cillian O'Connor 0-4 (0-3f), Andy Moran 0-3, Rob Hennelly (0-2f), Diarmuid O'Connor, Adam Gallagher, Conor Loftus (0-1f) 0-2 each, Eoin O'Donoghue, Kevin McLoughlin, Jason Doherty 0-1 each | Referee: Martin McNally (Monaghan); Man of the Match: Jason Doherty (Burrishoole) |

| Sunday, March 11 | Dublin | 2-17 (23) – 0-11 (11) | Kerry | Croke Park, Dublin |
| 4:00pm | Ciarán Kilkenny 1-3, Niall Scully 1-1, Dean Rock 0-4 (0-3f), Paddy Andrews 0-3, Colm Basquel 0-2, Jonny Cooper, Paddy Small, Philly McMahon, Cormac Costello 0-1 each | Report | David Clifford 0-4 (0-2f), Micheál Burns and Kevin McCarthy 0-2 each, Sean O'Shea, Paul Geaney, Michael Geaney 0-1 each | Attendance: 24,026; Referee: Ciaran Branagan (Down); Man of the Match: Ciaran Kilkenny |

==== Round 6 ====
| Saturday, March 17 | Kerry | 0-19 (19) – 0-14 (14) | Kildare | Austin Stack Park, Tralee |
| 7:00 pm | | Report | | Referee: David Coldrick |

| Sunday, March 18 | Mayo | 0-8 (08) – 2-14 (20) | Tyrone | MacHale Park, Castlebar |
| 2:00 pm | Conor Loftus 0-5 (0-4f), Tom Parsons, Fergal Boland, Neil Douglas 0-1 each | Report | Lee Brennan 1-3 (0-2f), Matthew Donnelly 0-4, Connor McAliskey 0-3f, Conal McCann 1-0, Conor Meyler, Frank Burns, Niall Sludden, Declan McClure 0-1 each | Referee: Maurice Deegan (Laois); Man of the Match: Mattie Donnelly (Trillick) |

| Sunday, March 18 | Galway | 0-13 (13) – 0-13 (13) | Dublin | Pearse Stadium, Salthill |
| 2:00 pm | Barry McHugh 0-5 (0-3f, 1 '45), Peter Cooke and Johnny Heaney 0-2 each, Gary O'Donnell, Adrian Varley, Shane Walsh, Damien Comer 0-1 each | Report | Ciarán Kilkenny 0-5, Dean Rock (0-2f) and Cormac Costello (0-2f) 0-2 each, Jonny Cooper, Paddy Andrews, Paddy Small (0-1f), Conor McHugh (0-1f) 0-1 each | Attendance: 10,050; Referee: Joe McQuillan (Cavan) |

| Sunday, March 18 | Monaghan | 1-16 (19) – 1-10 (13) | Donegal | St Tiernach's Park, Clones |
| 2:00pm | | Report |

==== Round 7 ====
| Sunday, March 25 | Donegal | 0-13 (13) – 0-13 (13) | Mayo | MacCumhaill Park, Ballybofey |
| 3:00pm | Paddy McBrearty 0-4 (0-2f), Eoghan Bán Gallagher, Jamie Brennan, Michael Murphy (0-1f) 0-2 each, Frank McGlynn, Ciarán Thompson, Odhran MacNiallais 0-1 each | Report | Conor Loftus 0-6 (0-5f), Andy Moran 0-3, Kevin McLoughlin 0-2, Eoin O'Donghue and Joason Doherty 0-1 each | Attendance: 11,250; Referee: Anthony Nolan (Wicklow); Man of the Match: Eoghan Ban Gallagher (Killybegs) |

| Sunday, March 25 | Dublin | 0-17 (17) – 2-12 (18) | Monaghan | Croke Park, Dublin |
| 3:00pm | Dean Rock 0-7 (0-5f), Philly McMahon, Brian Fenton, Brian Howard 0-2 each, David Byrne, John Small, Niall Scully, Colm Basquel 0-1 each | Report | Vincent Corey and Jack McCarron 1-1 each, Conor McCarthy 0-3 (0-2f), Conor McManus 0-2 (0-1f), Karl O'Connell, Dessie Mone, Ryan McAnespie, Kieran Hughes, Fintan Kelly 0-1 each | Attendance: 22,085; Referee: David Gough (Meath); Man of the Match: Drew Wylie (Ballybay) |

| Sunday, March 25 | Kildare | 0-10 (10) – 0-16 (16) | Galway | St Conleth's Park, Newbridge |
| 3:00pm | | Report |

| Sunday, March 25 | Tyrone | 1-16 (19) – 0-14 (14) | Kerry | Healy Park, Omagh |
| 3:00pm | | Report |

=== Division 1 Final ===
| Sunday, April 1; 4:00 pm Final | Dublin | 0-18 – 0-14 | Galway | Croke Park; Attendance: 36,572; Referee: A Nolan (Wicklow); Man of the Match: Ciaran Kilkenny (Castleknock) |
| Sunday, April 1; 4:00 pm Final | Dean Rock 0-7 (0-5f, 1 '45), Paul Mannion 0-3, Ciaran Kilkenny and Colm Basquel 0-2, Philly McMahon, John Small, Niall Scully, Eric Lowndes 0-1 each | Report | Barry McHugh 0-6 (0-5f), Damien Comer 0-3, Johnny Heaney and Shane Walsh (0-1f) 0-2 each, Paul Conroy 0-1 | Croke Park; Attendance: 36,572; Referee: A Nolan (Wicklow); Man of the Match: Ciaran Kilkenny (Castleknock) |

== Division 2 ==
=== Division 2 table ===
| Pos | Team | Pld | W | D | L | PF | PA | PD | Pts | Qualification or relegation |
|---|---|---|---|---|---|---|---|---|---|---|
| 1 | Roscommon | 7 | 5 | 1 | 1 | 126 | 105 | +21 | 11 | Advance to Division 2 Final |
| 2 | Cavan | 7 | 5 | 1 | 1 | 122 | 99 | +23 | 11 | Advance to Division 2 Final |
| 3 | Clare | 7 | 3 | 2 | 2 | 101 | 111 | −10 | 8 | |
| 4 | Tipperary | 7 | 3 | 1 | 3 | 128 | 106 | +22 | 7 | |
| 5 | Meath | 7 | 3 | 1 | 3 | 126 | 112 | +14 | 7 | |
| 6 | Cork | 7 | 3 | 0 | 4 | 111 | 108 | +3 | 6 | |
| 7 | Down | 7 | 3 | 0 | 4 | 100 | 106 | −6 | 6 | Relegation to Division 3 |
| 8 | Louth | 7 | 0 | 0 | 7 | 76 | 143 | −67 | 0 | Relegation to Division 3 |

Updated to match(es) played on 25 March 2018. Source: GAA.ie
Rules for classification: 1) League points 2) Where only two teams are involved, the outcome of the meeting of the two teams in the competition 3) Scoring Difference 4) Highest Total Score For 5) A Play-Off.

=== Division 2 Rounds 1 to 7 ===
==== Round 1 ====
| Saturday, January 27 | Clare | 1-12 – 2-09 | Cavan | Cusack Park, Ennis |
| 2:00pm | | Report | | Referee: Anthony Nolan (Wicklow) |

| Saturday, January 27 | Cork | 1-16 – 3-16 | Tipperary | Páirc Uí Chaoimh, Cork |
| 5:00pm | | Report | | Referee: Padraig O'Sullivan (Kerry) |

| Sunday, January 28 | Louth | 0-11 – 1-14 | Down | Gaelic Grounds, Drogheda |
| 2:00pm | | Report | | Referee: Cormac Reilly (Meath) |

| Sunday, January 28 | Roscommon | 2-12 – 2-12 | Meath | Dr. Hyde Park, Roscommon |
| 2:30pm | | Report | | Referee: Barry Cassidy (Derry) |

==== Round 2 ====
| Saturday, February 3 | Cavan | 3-17 – 0-13 | Louth | Breffni Park, Cavan |
| 7:00pm | | | | Referee: Jerome Henry (Mayo) |

| Sunday, February 4 | Down | 0-10 – 1-13 | Cork | Páirc Esler, Newry |
| 1:30pm | | Report | | Referee: Fergal Kelly (Longford) |

| Sunday, February 4 | Meath | 0-21 – 0-07 | Clare | Páirc Tailteann, Navan |
| 2:00pm | | Report | | Referee: Sean Hurson (Tyrone) |

| Sunday, February 4 | Tipperary | 3-09 – 1-17 | Roscommon | Semple Stadium, Thurles |
| 2:00pm | | Report | | Referee: Noel Mooney (Cavan) |

==== Round 3 ====
| Sunday, February 11 | Clare | 0-11 – 0-11 | Tipperary | Cusack Park, Ennis |
| 2:00pm |

| Sunday, February 11 | Cork | 2-11 – 0-10 | Louth | Páirc Uí Rinn, Cork |
| 2:00pm |

| Sunday, February 11 | Roscommon | 0-07 – 0-12 | Down | Dr. Hyde Park, Roscommon |
| 2:00pm |

| Sunday, February 18 | Cavan | 2-14 – 1-12 | Meath | Breffni Park, Cavan |
| 7:00pm | | | | Referee: Niall Cullen (Fermanagh) |

==== Round 4 ====
| Saturday, February 24 | Tipperary | 2-15 – 1-10 | Meath | Semple Stadium, Thurles |
| 7:00pm |

| Sunday, February 25 | Cork | 0-11 – 0-14 | Cavan | Páirc Uí Chaoimh, Cork |
| 1:00pm |

| Sunday, February 25 | Down | 1-10 – 1-12 | Clare | Páirc Esler, Newry |
| 2:00pm |

| Sunday, February 25 | Louth | 0-12 – 1-21 | Roscommon | Gaelic Grounds, Drogheda |
| 2:00pm |

==== Round 5 ====
| Saturday, March 10 | Cavan | 0-17 – 0-14 | Down | Breffni Park, Cavan |
| 7:00pm |

| Sunday, March 11 | Tipperary | 2-17 – 0-09 | Louth | Semple Stadium, Thurles |
| 12:30pm |

| Sunday, March 11 | Clare | 2-12 – 2-19 | Roscommon | Cusack Park, Ennis |
| 2:00pm |

| Sunday, March 11 | Meath | 1-15 – 2-16 | Cork | Páirc Tailteann, Navan |
| 3:00pm |

==== Round 6 ====
| Saturday, March 17 | Cork | 0-12 – 0-14 | Clare | Páirc Uí Rinn, Cork |
| 7:00pm |

| Sunday, March 18 | Roscommon | 0-15 – 0-13 | Cavan | Dr. Hyde Park, Roscommon |
| 2:00pm |

| Saturday, March 31 | Down | 2-11 – 1-11 | Tipperary | Páirc Esler, Newry |
| 3:00 pm |

| Saturday, March 31 | Louth | 0-7 – 1-12 | Meath | Gaelic Grounds, Drogheda |
| 3:00 pm | | Report | | Referee: Noel Mooney (Cavan) |

==== Round 7 ====
| Sunday, March 25 | Cavan | 0-17 – 2-10 | Tipperary | Breffni Park, Cavan |
| 3:00pm |

| Sunday, March 25 | Clare | 3-12 – 1-11 | Louth | Cusack Park, Ennis |
| 3:00pm |

| Sunday, March 25 | Meath | 4-14 – 1-14 | Down | Páirc Tailteann, Navan |
| 3:00pm |

| Sunday, March 25 | Roscommon | 0-17 – 1-11 | Cork | Dr. Hyde Park, Roscommon |
| 3:00pm |

=== Division 2 Final ===
| Sunday, April 1; 2:00 pm Final | Roscommon | 4-16 – 4-12 | Cavan | Croke Park; Referee: Sean Hurson (Tyrone); Man of the Match: Conor Devaney (Kilbride) |
| Sunday, April 1; 2:00 pm Final | Cathal Cregg 2-1, Niall Kilroy 1-1, Diarmiud Murtagh 0-4 (0-2f), David Murray 1-0, Conor Devaney and Donie Smith 0-3 each, Ciaran Murtagh (0-1f), Niall McInerney, Enda Smith, Ian Kilbride 0-1 each | Report | Dara McVeety 1-3, Seanie Johnston 0-4 (0-2f), Enda Flanagan, Martin Reilly (1-0 pen), Conor Bradley 1-0 each, Raymond Galligan (1 '45), Padraig Faulkner, Ciaran Brady, Gearoid McKiernan (0-1f), Caoimhin O’Reilly (0-1f) 0-1 each | Croke Park; Referee: Sean Hurson (Tyrone); Man of the Match: Conor Devaney (Kilbride) |

== Division 3 ==
=== Division 3 table ===
| Pos | Team | Pld | W | D | L | PF | PA | PD | Pts | Qualification or relegation |
|---|---|---|---|---|---|---|---|---|---|---|
| 1 | Armagh | 7 | 5 | 1 | 1 | 114 | 81 | +33 | 11 | Advance to Division 3 Final |
| 2 | Fermanagh | 7 | 5 | 1 | 1 | 97 | 78 | +19 | 11 | Advance to Division 3 Final |
| 3 | Longford | 7 | 4 | 1 | 2 | 120 | 94 | +26 | 9 | |
| 4 | Westmeath | 7 | 4 | 0 | 3 | 119 | 124 | −5 | 8 | |
| 5 | Sligo | 7 | 2 | 2 | 3 | 96 | 116 | −20 | 6 | |
| 6 | Offaly | 7 | 2 | 1 | 4 | 97 | 118 | −21 | 5 | |
| 7 | Derry | 7 | 2 | 0 | 5 | 122 | 126 | −4 | 4 | Relegation to Division 4 |
| 8 | Wexford | 7 | 1 | 0 | 6 | 91 | 119 | −28 | 2 | Relegation to Division 4 |

Updated to match(es) played on 28 February 2018. Source: GAA.ie
Rules for classification: 1) League points 2) Where only two teams are involved, the outcome of the meeting of the two teams in the competition 3) Scoring Difference 4) Highest Total Score For 5) A Play-Off.

=== Division 3 Rounds 1 to 7 ===
==== Round 1 ====
| Sunday, January 28 | Armagh | 2-17 – 0-09 | Sligo | Athletic Grounds, Armagh |
| 2:00pm | | Report | | Referee: Brendan Cawley (Kildare) |

| Sunday, January 28 | Derry | 2-14 – 2-17 | Westmeath | Celtic Park, Derry |
| 2:30pm | | Report | | Referee: James Molloy (Galway) |

| Sunday, January 28 | Fermanagh | 3-07 – 2-05 | Wexford | Brewster Park, Enniskillen |
| 2:00pm | | Report | | Referee: Liam Devenney (Mayo) |

| Sunday, January 28 | Offaly | 1-13 – 3-18 | Longford | O'Connor Park, Tullamore |
| 2:30pm | | Report | | Referee: Niall Mc Kenna (Monaghan) |

==== Round 2 ====
| Sunday, February 4 | Fermanagh | 2-11 – 1-06 | Offaly | Brewster Park, Enniskillen |
| 2:00pm | | Report | | Referee: Eamon O'Grady (Leitrim) |

| Sunday, February 4 | Longford | 1-13 – 1-06 | Derry | Pearse Park, Longford |
| 2:00pm | | Report | | Referee: Paul Faloon (Down) |

| Sunday, February 4 | Sligo | 1-16 – 1-13 | Wexford | Markievicz Park, Sligo |
| 2:00pm | | Report | | Referee: Sean Laverty (Antrim) |

| Sunday, February 4 | Westmeath | 1-11 – 2-17 | Armagh | Cusack Park, Mullingar |
| 2:30pm | | Report | | Referee: Martin McNally (Monaghan) |

==== Round 3 ====
| Sunday, February 11 | Armagh | 1-11 – 1-10 | Longford | Athletic Grounds, Armagh |
| 2:00pm |

| Sunday, February 11 | Wexford | 1-10 – 0-16 | Westmeath | Wexford Park, Wexford |
| 2:00pm |

| Sunday, February 18 | Derry | 1-15 – 0-13 | Offaly | Celtic Park, Derry |
| 2:30 pm |

| Sunday, February 18 | Sligo | 0-08 – 0-13 | Fermanagh | Markievicz Park, Sligo |
| 2:00 pm |

==== Round 4 ====
| Saturday, February 24 | Fermanagh | 1-16 – 3-08 | Derry | Brewster Park, Enniskillen |
| 7:00 pm | | | | Referee: Padraig Hughes (Armagh) |

| Sunday, February 25 | Westmeath | 0-20 – 0-14 | Sligo | Cusack Park, Mullingar |
| 2:00pm |

| Sunday, February 25 | Longford | 1-12 – 0-09 | Wexford | Pearse Park, Longford |
| 2:30pm |

| Sunday, February 25 | Offaly | 1-09 – 1-15 | Armagh | O'Connor Park, Tullamore |
| 2:30pm |

==== Round 5 ====
| Saturday, March 10 | Wexford | 1-10 – 1-13 | Offaly | Wexford Park, Wexford |
| 3:00pm |

| Saturday, March 10 | Armagh | 1-15 – 0-14 | Derry | Athletic Grounds, Armagh |
| 7:00pm |

| Sunday, March 11 | Sligo | 0-18 – 2-12 | Longford | Markievicz Park, Sligo |
| 2:00pm |

| Sunday, March 11 | Westmeath | 0-14 – 1-09 | Fermanagh | Cusack Park, Mullingar |
| 3:00pm |

==== Round 6 ====
| Sunday, March 18 | Derry | 2-20 – 3-08 | Wexford | Celtic Park, Derry |
| 1:00 pm | | | | Referee: Eamonn O'Grady |

| Sunday, March 18 | Fermanagh | 0-07 – 0-07 | Armagh | Brewster Park, Enniskillen |
| 2:00pm |

| Sunday, March 18 | Longford | 1-16 – 1-12 | Westmeath | Pearse Park, Longford |
| 2:00pm |

| Monday, March 19 | Offaly | 0-08 – 0-08 | Sligo | O'Connor Park, Tullamore |
| 2:00pm | | | | Referee: J Molloy |

==== Round 7 ====
| Sunday, March 25 | Longford | 1-09 – 1-10 | Fermanagh | Pearse Park, Longford |
| 3:00 pm |

| Sunday, March 25 | Sligo | 3-11 – 2-12 | Derry | Markievicz Park, Sligo |
| 3:00 pm | | | | Referee: Patrick Maguire (Longford) |

| Sunday, March 25 | Westmeath | 1-14 – 1-20 | Offaly | Cusack Park, Mullingar |
| 3:00 pm |

| Sunday, March 25 | Wexford | 0-12 – 1-08 | Armagh | Wexford Park, Wexford |
| 1:00 pm |

=== Division 3 Final ===
| Saturday, March 31; 5.00 pm Final | Armagh | 1-16 – 0-17 | Fermanagh | Croke Park; Referee: James Molloy (Galway); Man of the Match: Andrew Murnin (St Paul's Lurgan) |
| Saturday, March 31; 5.00 pm Final | Andrew Murnin 1-3, Niall Grimley 0-4 (0-3f), Patrick Burns, Aidan Forker, Ryan McShane 0-2 each, Niall Rowland, Gregory McCabe, Ben Crealey 0-1 each | Report | Seamus Quigley 0-9f, Conall Jones 0-3, Ryan Jones 0-2, Barry Mulrone, Declan McCusker, Tomas Corrigan 0-1 each | Croke Park; Referee: James Molloy (Galway); Man of the Match: Andrew Murnin (St Paul's Lurgan) |

== Division 4 ==
=== Division 4 table ===
| Pos | Team | Pld | W | D | L | PF | PA | PD | Pts | Qualification or relegation |
|---|---|---|---|---|---|---|---|---|---|---|
| 1 | Laois | 6 | 6 | 0 | 0 | 106 | 75 | +31 | 12 | Advance to Division 4 Final |
| 2 | Carlow | 7 | 6 | 0 | 1 | 115 | 81 | +34 | 12 | Advance to Division 4 Final |
| 3 | Antrim | 6 | 4 | 1 | 1 | 90 | 67 | +23 | 9 | |
| 4 | London | 7 | 2 | 1 | 4 | 93 | 97 | −4 | 5 | |
| 5 | Leitrim | 6 | 2 | 0 | 4 | 74 | 79 | −5 | 4 | |
| 6 | Limerick | 6 | 1 | 1 | 4 | 76 | 104 | −28 | 3 | |
| 7 | Waterford | 6 | 1 | 1 | 4 | 85 | 99 | −14 | 3 | |
| 8 | Wicklow | 6 | 0 | 2 | 4 | 66 | 103 | −37 | 2 | |

Updated to match(es) played on 24 February 2018. Source: GAA.ie
Rules for classification: 1) League points 2) Where only two teams are involved, the outcome of the meeting of the two teams in the competition 3) Scoring Difference 4) Highest Total Score For 5) A Play-Off.
- Three games (Laois v Antrim, Waterford v Leitrim and Wicklow v Limerick) were postponed due to poor weather. The CCCC decided to cancel them as the results were irrelevant to determining the league finalists. Several managers and the Gaelic Players Association criticised the decision as undermining the integrity of the division, arguing that Division 1 games would not be cancelled in the same fashion.

=== Division 4 Rounds 1 to 7 ===
==== Round 1 ====
| Saturday, January 27 | London | 2-9 – 2-14 | Carlow | McGovern Park, Ruislip |
| 1:00pm | Liam Gavaghan 1-4 (0-4f), Eoin Murray 1-0 pen, Adrian Moyles (0-1f) and Killian Butler 0-2 each, Ryan Elliot 0-1 | Report | Paul Broderick 0-6 (0-5f), Jordan Morrissey and Eoghan Ruth 1-1 each, Darragh Foley 0-2f, Daniel St. Ledger, Ciaran Moran, Sean Murphy, Gary Kelly 0-1 each | Referee: James Bermingham (Cork) |

| Saturday, January 27 | Laois | 2-12 – 0-09 | Limerick | O'Moore Park, Portlaoise |
| 7:00pm | Gary Walsh 1-6 (0-4f), Paul Kingston 1-0, Eoin Lowry 0-3, Daniel O'Reilly 0-2, Aaron Dowling 0-1 | Report | Jamie Lee 0-4 (0-1f), Sean O'Dea, Jim Liston, Seamus O'Carroll, Sean McSweeney, Kieran Daly 0-1 each | Referee: Patrick Maguire (Longford); Man of the Match: Gary Walsh (Ballylinan) |

| Sunday, January 28 | Antrim | 0-15 – 0-05 | Leitrim | Corrigan Park, Belfast |
| 2:00pm | | Report | | Referee: Barry Tiernan (Dublin) |

| Sunday, January 28 | Wicklow | 0-12 – 0-12 | Waterford | Joule Park, Aughrim |
| 2:30pm | | Report | | Referee: Seamus Mulhare (Laois) |

==== Round 2 ====
| Sunday, February 4 | London | 1-16 – 0-10 | Wicklow | McGovern Park, Ruislip |
| 1:00pm | | Report | | Referee: Alan Kissane (Waterford) |

| Sunday, February 4 | Leitrim | 3-10 – 3-16 | Laois | Páirc Seán Mac Diarmada, Carrick-on-Shannon |
| 2:00pm | Keith Beirne 0-8 (0-4f), Darragh Rooney 2-1 (1-0 pen), Ryan O'Rourke 1-0, Brendan Gallagher 0-1 | Report | Gary Walsh 1-8 (0-6f), Eoin Lowry 1-1 (1-0 pen), Trevor Collins 1-0, Evan O'Carroll 0-3, Paul Kingston and Ross Munnelly 0-2 each | Referee: Barry Judge (Sligo); Man of the Match: John O'Loughlin (St. Brigid's) |

| Sunday, February 4 | Limerick | 0-13 – 2-11 | Carlow | Newcastlewest, Limerick |
| 2:00pm | Jamie Lee 0-4 (0-2f), Danny Neville 0-2, Garrett Noonan, Sean O'Dea, Jim Liston, Darragh Treacy, Peter Nash, Seamus O'Carroll, Josh Ryan (0-1f) 0-1 each | Report | Paul Broderick 1-6 (0-5f), John Murphy 1-0, Daniel St. Ledger, Ciaran Moran, Brendan Murphy, Sean Murphy, Darragh Foley (0-1f) 0-1 each | Referee: John Gilmartin (Sligo); Man of the Match: Brendan Murphy (Rathvilly) |

| Sunday, February 4 | Waterford | 0-10 – 2-12 | Antrim | Fraher Field, Dungarvan |
| 2:00pm | | Report | | Referee: Sean Lonergan (Tipperary) |

==== Round 3 ====
| Saturday, February 10 | Carlow | 2-11 – 0-5 | Leitrim | Dr. Cullen Park, Carlow |
| 5:00pm | John Murphy 2-0 (1-0 pen), Brendan Murphy 0-5, Paul Broderick 0-4 (0-3f), Darragh Foley (0-1f) and Darragh O'Brien 0-1 each | Report | Keith Beirne 0-2f, Damien Moran, Darragh Rooney, Noel Plunkett 0-1 each | Referee: Alan Kissane (Waterford); Man of the Match: Brendan Murphy (Rathvilly) |

| Saturday, February 10 | Laois | 0-18 – 1-11 | Waterford | O'Moore Park, Portlaoise |
| 7:00pm | Gary Walsh 0-10 (0-8f), Kieran Lillis, Ross Munnelly (0-1f), Donie Kingston 0-2 each, Alan Farrell and Paul Kingston 0-1 each | Report | JJ Hutchinson 1-4 (0-1f), Jason Curry 0-4 (0-2f), Conor Murray, Paul Whyte, Donie Breathnach 0-1 each | Referee: James Bermingham (Cork); Man of the Match: Gary Walsh (Ballylinan) |

| Sunday, February 11 | London | 2-8 – 2-8 | Limerick | McGovern Park, Ruislip |
| 1:00pm |

| Sunday, February 11 | Antrim | 0-12 – 0-12 | Wicklow | Corrigan Park, Belfast |
| 2:00pm |

==== Round 4 ====
| Saturday, February 24 | Waterford | 2-9 – 2-12 | Carlow | Fraher Field, Dungarvan |
| 7:00pm | | Report | | Referee: Brendan Cawley (Kildare); Man of the Match: Brendan Murphy (Rathvilly) |

| Sunday, February 25 | Leitrim | 2-18 – 1-09 | Limerick | Páirc Seán Mac Diarmada, Carrick-on-Shannon |
| 2:00pm |

| Sunday, February 25 | Wicklow | 0-10 – 1-16 | Laois | Joule Park, Aughrim |
| 2:00pm |

| Sunday, February 25 | London | 0-13 – 0-17 | Antrim | McGovern Park, Ruislip |
| 2:30pm |

==== Round 5 ====
| Saturday, March 10 | Carlow | 1-17 – 0-12 | Wicklow | Netwatch Cullen Park, Carlow |
| 7:00pm | | Report |

| Saturday, March 10 | Limerick | 2-10 – 2-09 | Waterford | Kilmallock, Limerick |
| 7:00pm |

| Not played | Laois | Cancelled by the CCCC | Antrim | O'Moore Park, Portlaoise |

| Sunday, April 1 | London | w/o - scr | Leitrim | McGovern Park, Ruislip |
| | | Report |

==== Round 6 ====
| Sunday, March 11 | London | 2-9 – 0-17 | Laois | McGovern Park, Ruislip |
| 1:00pm |

| Sunday, March 18 | Antrim | 0-12 – 1-12 | Carlow | Fr. McGuigan Park, Ahogill |
| 2:00pm | | Report |

| Not played | Waterford | Cancelled by the CCCC | Leitrim | Fraher Field, Dungarvan |
| 2:00pm |

| Not Played | Wicklow | Cancelled by the CCCC | Limerick | Joule Park, Aughrim |
| 2:00pm |

==== Round 7 ====
| Sunday, March 25 | Carlow | 0-08 – 1-06 | Laois | Netwatch Cullen Park, Carlow |
| 1:00pm |

| Sunday, March 25 | Leitrim | 2-15 – 0-10 | Wicklow | Páirc Seán Mac Diarmada, Carrick-on-Shannon |
| 1:00pm |

| Sunday, March 25 | Limerick | 0-12 – 1-13 | Antrim | Gaelic Grounds, Limerick |
| 1:00pm |

| Sunday, March 25 | London | 1-14 – 1-16 | Waterford | McGovern Park, Ruislip |
| 1:00pm |

=== Division 4 Final ===
| Saturday, March 31; 3:00 pm | Laois | 0-15 – 0-11 | Carlow | Croke Park; Referee: Martin McNally (Monaghan); Man of the Match: Graham Brody (Portlaoise) |
| Saturday, March 31; 3:00 pm | Donie Kingston 0-5 (0-2f), Ross Munnelly 0-4 (0-2f), Eoin Lowry 0-3 (0-1f), John O'Louglin, Kieran Lillis, Alan Farrell 0-1 each | Report | Sean Gannon and Darragh Foley (0-1f) 0-3 each, Paul Broderick 0-2, Shane Redmond, Brendan Murphy, Sean Murphy 0-1 each | Croke Park; Referee: Martin McNally (Monaghan); Man of the Match: Graham Brody (Portlaoise) |

== League statistics ==
- All scores correct as of 3 April 2018

=== Top scorer: Overall ===
| Rank | Player | County | Tally | Total | Matches | Average |
|---|---|---|---|---|---|---|
| 1 | Gary Walsh | Laois | 4-41 | 53 | 6 | 8.8 |
| 2 | Paul Broderick | Carlow | 2-46 | 52 | 8 | 6.5 |
| 3 | Seamus Quigley | Fermanagh | 4-37 | 49 | 7 | 7 |
| 4 | Conor Sweeney | Tipperary | 3-31 | 40 | 6 | 6.7 |
| 5 | John Heslin | Westmeath | 1-36 | 39 | 6 | 6.5 |
| 6 | Keith Beirne | Leitrim | 3-28 | 37 | 5 | 7.4 |
| 7 | Lee Brennan | Tyrone | 2-30 | 36 | 7 | 5.1 |
| 7 | Diarmuid Murtagh | Roscommon | 3-27 | 36 | 8 | 4.5 |
| 9 | Dean Rock | Dublin | 1-32 | 35 | 8 | 4.4 |
| 10 | Patrick McBrearty | Donegal | 0-34 | 34 | 5 | 6.8 |
| 11 | Nigel Dunne | Offaly | 0-32 | 32 | 7 | 4.6 |
| 11 | Colm O'Neill | Cork | 2-26 | 32 | 7 | 4.6 |
| 13 | Mark Collins | Cork | 1-28 | 31 | 7 | 4.4 |
| 13 | Donie Smith | Roscommon | 1-28 | 31 | 8 | 3.9 |
| 13 | Robbie Smyth | Longford | 2-25 | 31 | 7 | 4.4 |
| 16 | Barry McHugh | Galway | 1-27 | 30 | 5 | 6 |

=== Top Scorer: Single game ===
| Rank | Player | County | Tally | Total | Opposition |
|---|---|---|---|---|---|
| 1 | Keith Beirne | Leitrim | 2-08 | 14 | Limerick |
| 2 | Jason Curry | Waterford | 1-09 | 12 | London |
| 3 | Gary Walsh | Laois | 0-11 | 11 | London |
| 3 | Seamus Quigley | Fermanagh | 1-08 | 11 | Derry |
| 3 | Gary Walsh | Laois | 1-08 | 11 | Leitrim |
| 3 | Liam McGrath | Tipperary | 2-05 | 11 | Cork |
| 7 | Patrick McBrearty | Donegal | 0-10 | 10 | Kerry |
| 7 | Gary Walsh | Laois | 0-10 | 10 | Waterford |
| 7 | Paul Broderick | Carlow | 1-07 | 10 | Wicklow |
| 7 | Liam Gavaghan | London | 1-07 | 10 | Wicklow |
| 7 | John Heslin | Westmeath | 1-07 | 10 | Derry |
| 7 | Conor Sweeney | Tipperary | 2-04 | 10 | Roscommon |

=== Scoring events ===
- Widest winning margin: 14
  - Armagh 2-17 – 0-09 Sligo (Division 3)
  - Meath 0-21 – 0-07 Clare (Division 2)
  - Tipperary 2-17 – 0-09 Louth (Division 2)
- Most goals in a match: 8
  - Cavan 4-12 – 4-16 Roscommon (Division 2 final)
- Most points in a match: 35
  - Dublin 0-20 – 0-15 Donegal (Division 1)
- Most goals by one team in a match: 4
  - Cavan 4-12 – 4-16 Roscommon (Division 2 final)
  - Meath 4-14 – 1-14 Down (Division 2)
- Highest aggregate score: 52 points
  - Cavan 4-12 – 4-16 Roscommon (Division 2 final)
- Lowest aggregate score: 14 points
  - Fermanagh 0-07 – 0-07 Armagh (Division 3)
