= 2017 Armagh Senior Football Championship =

Armagh SFC
- Season: 2017
- Champions: Armagh Harps (21st title)
- Relegated: Wolfe Tones (7th in the SBFL); Culloville Blues (8th in the SBFL)
- Winning Captain: Conor White
- Man Of The Match: Ultan Lennon
- Winning Manager: John Toner
- Ulster SCFC: ???

The 2017 Armagh Senior Football Championship is the 117th official edition of Armagh GAA's premier gaelic football competition for senior clubs and was won by Armagh Harps. The tournament consisted of 16 teams with the winner, Armagh Harps receiving the Gerry Fegan Cup and representing Armagh in the Ulster Senior Club Football Championship.

The championship has a backdoor format for the first two rounds where any team to lose two matches will be eliminated before proceeding to a knock-out format.

Maghery Seán McDermott's were the defending champions after they defeated St. Patrick's Cullyhanna in the 2016 final.

This was Culloville Blues and Whitecross' return to the senior grade after they claimed the 2016 I.A.F.L. and I.F.C. titles respectively.

Wolfe Tones and Culloville Blues are relegated to the I.F.C. and I.A.F.L. for 2018 after they finished 7th and 8th in the S.B.F.L. respectively. They will be replaced by the I.F.C. champions Killeavy St Moninna's as well as the I.A.F.L. champions Silverbridge Harps.

== Changes from 2016 season ==
=== Promoted To S.F.C. from I.F.C. ===
- Whitecross – (IFC Champions)
- Culloville Blues – (IAFL Champions)

=== Relegated to I.F.C. from S.F.C. ===
- Forkhill – (7th SBFL)
- Grange – (8th SBFL)

== Rounds 1 to 3 ==
=== Round 1 ===
All 16 teams play in this round. The 8 winners progress to Round 2A while the 8 losers progress to Round 2B.

- Ballymacnab 2-16, 1-9 Culloville Blues, Silverbridge, 11/8/2017,
- Granemore 1-20, 2-11 Tír na nÓg, Maghery, 12/8/2017,
- Crossmaglen Rangers 0-17, 1-13 Whitecross, Cullyhanna, 12/8/2017,
- Armagh Harps 1-21, 0-9 Annaghmore, Pearse Óg Park, 12/8/2017,
- Maghery 1-19, 1-10 Madden, Abbey Park, 13/8/2017,
- Dromintee 2-20, 2-12 Sarsfields, Abbey Park, 13/8/2017,
- Cullyhanna 3-17, 1-10 Wolfe Tones, Athletic Grounds, 13/8/2017,
- Clann Éireann 2-12, 1-10 Pearse Óg's, Athletic Grounds, 13/8/2017,

=== Round 2 ===
==== Round 2A ====
The 8 winners from Round 1 enter this round. The 4 winners enter the draw for the quarter-finals while the 4 losers play in Round 3.

| 8/25/17; 8:30 pm | Maghery | 3-7 – 1-8 | Crossmaglen Rangers | Athletic Grounds; Referee: Oliver Hearty |
| 8/25/17; 8:30 pm | Aidan Forker 1-1 (0-1f, 1 sl), James Lavery and Daniel Higgins 1-0 each, Stefan Forker 0-2 (0-1f), Johnny Montgomery (1 '45), Stephen Cusack, David Lavery, Ben Crealey 0-1 each | Report | Jamie Clarke 1-0, Aaron Kernan (0-1f) and Rian O'Neill 0-2 each, Paul Hughes, Stephen Kernan, Kyle Carragher, Paul McKeown 0-1 each | Athletic Grounds; Referee: Oliver Hearty |

| 8/26/17; 6:30 pm | Armagh Harps | 4-14 – 4-9 | Cullyhanna | Crossmaglen; Referee: Kevin Faloon |
| 8/26/17; 6:30 pm | Ryan McShane 3-0, Tom O'Kane 0-4, Charlie Vernon 1-0, Ultan Lennon 0-3 (0-2f), Conor Coulter 0-1 | | Shea Hoey 2-2, Jason Duffy 1-2, Eugene Casey 0-4 (0-3f), Kieran Hoey 1-0, Aidan Nugent 0-1f | Crossmaglen; Referee: Kevin Faloon |

| 8/28/17; 6:45 pm | Clann Éireann | 2-9 – 1-10 | Dromintee | Athletic Grounds; Referee: Philip Conway |
| 8/28/17; 6:45 pm | Conor McConville 1-6 (0-6f), Daniel McKavanagh 1-0, Conor Turbitt 0-3 (1 '45, 0-1f) | Report | Aidan Morgan 1-2 (0-2f), Shane McCoy (0-2f), Cathal McKenna (0-2f), Conor Martin 0-2 each, Aaron Boyle (0-1f) and Shane Carroll 0-1 each | Athletic Grounds; Referee: Philip Conway |

| 8/28/17; 8:30 pm | Ballymacnab | 2-18 – 1-6 | Granemore | Athletic Grounds; Referee: Padraig Hughes |
| 8/28/17; 8:30 pm | Rory Grugan 1-5 (0-2f), Ryan Kennedy 1-1 (1-0 pen), Jack Grugan 0-3, Finnen Maguire and Brian McCone (0-1f) 0-2 each, Michael Beagan, Pauric Gribben, Paul Kennedy, Gavin McParland, Damien McGeown 0-1 each | Report | Eoghan O’Neill 1-0, Jason O'Neill 0-3 (0-2f), Kieran Toner, Pete Carr, Liam Doyle 0-1 each | Athletic Grounds; Referee: Padraig Hughes |

==== Round 2B ====
The 8 losers from Round 1 enter this round. The 4 winners advance to Round 3 while the 4 losers exit the Championship.

- Annaghmore 2-15, 3-12 Sarsfields, Athletic Grounds, 25/8/2017,
- Whitecross 1-8, 0-10 Culloville Blues, Silverbridge, 25/8/2017,
- Wolfe Tones 3-14, 2-11 Pearse Óg's, Portadown, 26/8/2017,
- Madden 4-14, 2-8 Tír na nÓg, Granemore, 27/8/2017,
- Sarsfields 1-14, 0-13 Annaghmore, Davitt Park, 30/8/2017, (Replay)

=== Round 3 ===
The 4 losers from Round 2A (who won a match and lost a match) play the 4 winners from Round 2B (who lost a match and won a match). The 4 winners qualify for the quarter-finals.

| 9/8/17; 8:30 pm | Madden | 1-15 – 1-9 | Dromintee | Athletic Grounds; Referee: Ruan McKinstry |
| 9/8/17; 8:30 pm | Niall Grimley 0-7 (0-6f, 1 '45), Aron McKenna 1-2 | | Shane McCoy 0-3 (0-1f), Ryan Gaskin 0-2, Aidan Morgan and Cathal McKenna 0-1 each | Athletic Grounds; Referee: Ruan McKinstry |

| 9/9/17; 5:45 pm | Sarsfields | 2-10 – 0-13 | Granemore | Abbey Park; Referee: Philip Conway |

| 9/10/17; 2:45 pm | Cullyhanna | 2-12 – 2-7 | Whitecross | Crossmaglen; Referee: Christopher Lennon |
| 9/10/17; 2:45 pm | Aidan Nugent 0-6 (0-3f), Eugene Casey 0-4 (0-1f), Aodhan Conlon (1-0 pen) and Jason Duffy 1-0 each, Sean Connell and Pearse Casey (0-1f) 0-1 each | | Conor Malone 1-1, Barry Og McKeown 1-0, Kieran McNulty 0-2, Cathal McSherry, Ryan McSherry, Colm O'Hanlon, Mark Shields (0-1f) 0-1 each | Crossmaglen; Referee: Christopher Lennon |

| 9/10/17; 7:00 pm | Crossmaglen Rangers | 1-19 – 1-7 | Wolfe Tones | Athletic Grounds; Referee: Paul Boylan |
| 9/10/17; 7:00 pm | Rian O'Neill 0-6 (0-3f), Aaron Kernan 0-5 (0-4f), Oisin O'Neill 0-3, Kyle Carragher 1-0, Paul Hughes and Stephen Morris 0-2 each, Martin Aherne 0-1 | | James Lavery 1-2 (0-2f), Paudie Judge 0-3f, James Doyle and Niall Geoghan 0-1 each | Athletic Grounds; Referee: Paul Boylan |

== Knock-Out Stage ==
=== Last Eight Draw ===
| Quarter-Finals | | Semi-Finals | | Final |
| Armagh Harps | 1-10 (1-10 R) |
| Cullyhanna | 1-10 (0-9 R) | Armagh Harps | 1-13 |
| Ballymacnab | 2-14 | Ballymacnab | 0-11 |
| Madden | 4-7 | | | Armagh Harps | 2-9 |
| Maghery | 1-17 | | | Maghery | 0-11 |
| Sarsfields | 3-7 | Maghery | 2-13 |
| Crossmaglen Rangers | 1-23 | Crossmaglen Rangers | 0-16 |
| Clann Éireann | 0-10 |

=== Quarter-finals ===
The four winners from Round 2A play the four winners from Round 3. The 4 winners advance to the semi-finals.

| 9/15/17; 8:30 pm | Armagh Harps | 1-10 – 1-10 | Cullyhanna | Athletic Grounds; Referee: Stephen Murray |
| 9/15/17; 8:30 pm | Ultan Lennon 0-6 (0-4f), Gareth Swift 1-1, Declan McKenna 0-2, Simon McCoy 0-1 | Report | Aidan Nugent 1-5 (1-0 pen, 0-4f), Eugene Casey 0-3 (0-1f), Sean Connell and Ciaran McKeever 0-1 each | Athletic Grounds; Referee: Stephen Murray |

| 9/16/17; 5:00 pm | Ballymacnab | 2-14 – 4-7 | Madden | Athletic Grounds; Referee: Kevin Faloon |
| 9/16/17; 5:00 pm | Jack Grugan 2-4, Rory Grugan and Gavin McParland 0-3 each, Paul Kennedy and Brian McCone 0-2 each | Report | Aaron McKenna 2-2 (1-0 pen), Conor Grimley 1-3, Donal Rafferty 1-0, Niall Grimley (0-1f) and Kyle Morgan 0-1 each | Athletic Grounds; Referee: Kevin Faloon |

| 9/16/17; 6:45 pm | Crossmaglen Rangers | 1-23 – 0-10 | Clann Éireann | Athletic Grounds; Referee: Stephen McKinley |
| 9/16/17; 6:45 pm | Rian O'Neill 0-7 (0-3f), Kyle Carragher 1-3, Aaron Kernan (0-3f) and Oisin O'Neill 0-4 each, Stephen Morris 0-3, Seanie McConville and Padraig Stuttard 0-1 each | | Ryan Henderson and Conor McConville (0-2f) 0-2 each, Conor Turbitt, Ryan Owens, Jonny Terrode, Adam Kelly, Jack Wilson, Shea Heffron (0-1f) 0-1 each | Athletic Grounds; Referee: Stephen McKinley |

| 9/18/17; 8:30 pm | Maghery | 1-17 – 3-7 | Sarsfields | Athletic Grounds; Referee: Padraig Hughes |
| 9/18/17; 8:30 pm | Stefan Forker 0-4 (0-1f), Stephen Cusack, Conor Mackle, Aidan Forker (0-1f) 0-3 each, Ronan Lappin 1-0, Ben Crealey, Brian Fox, Seamus Forker, Shea Tennyson 0-1 each | Report | Eamon McGeown 2-1 (1-0 pen), Michael McGeown 1-0, Chris McGaughey (0-2f) and Michael Stevenson 0-2 each, Sean McAlinden and Caoimhin Robinson 0-1 each | Athletic Grounds; Referee: Padraig Hughes |

| 9/22/17; 8:30 pm | Armagh Harps | 1-10 – 0-9 | Cullyhanna | Athletic Grounds; Referee: Kevin Faloon |
| 9/22/17; 8:30 pm | Ultan Lennon 0-5 (0-3f), Simon McCoy 1-1, Declan McKenna, Ryan McShane, Joe McElroy, Lorcan Oliver 0-1 each | | Eugene Casey (0-1f) and Aidan Nugent (0-3f) 0-3 each, Pearse Casey 0-2 (1 '45), Jason Duffy 0-1 | Athletic Grounds; Referee: Kevin Faloon |

=== Semi-finals ===
| 29 September 2017; 8:30 pm Semi-final | Armagh Harps | 1-13 – 0-11 | Ballymacnab | Athletic Grounds; Referee: Jake Magill |
| 29 September 2017; 8:30 pm Semi-final | Conor Coulter 1-0, Declan McKenna and Gareth Swift (0-2f) 0-3 each, Joe McElroy and Tom O'Kane 0-2 each, Josh Loughran, Ultan Lennon, Conor Murphy (0-1f) 0-1 each | Report | Rory Grugan 0-7 (0-3f), Ryan Kennedy, Jack Grugan (0-1f), Paul Kennedy, Brian McCone (0-1f) 0-1 each | Athletic Grounds; Referee: Jake Magill |

| 30 September 2017; 6:00 pm Semi-final | Maghery | 2-13 – 0-16 | Crossmaglen Rangers | Athletic Grounds; Referee: Kevin Faloon; Man of the Match: Stephen Cusack |
| 30 September 2017; 6:00 pm Semi-final | Stephen Cusack 1-2 (0-1f), Stefan Forker (0-2f) and Aidan Forker (0-2f) 0-4 each, Ronan Lappin 1-0, Ciaran Higgins, Ben Crealey, Paul Forker 0-1 each | Report | Oisin O'Neill (0-1f) and Rian O'Neill (0-2f) 0-4 each, Aaron Kernan 0-3f, Stephen Kernan and Padraig Stuttard 0-2 each, Paul Hughes 0-1 | Athletic Grounds; Referee: Kevin Faloon; Man of the Match: Stephen Cusack |

=== Final ===
| 15 October 2017; 5:00 pm Final | Armagh Harps | 2-9 – 0-11 | Maghery | Athletic Grounds; Attendance: 7,061; Referee: Kevin Faloon; Man of the Match: Ultan Lennon |
| 15 October 2017; 5:00 pm Final | Ultan Lennon 1-5 (0-3f), Ryan McShane 1-1, Conor White, Joe McElroy (0-1f), Conor Murphy 0-1 each | Report | Stefan Forker (0-1f) and Aidan Forker (0-2f) 0-3 each, James Lavery, Connor Mackle, Ronan Lappin, David Fox, Seamus Forker 0-1 each | Athletic Grounds; Attendance: 7,061; Referee: Kevin Faloon; Man of the Match: Ultan Lennon |
