= 2016 Armagh Senior Football Championship =

Armagh SFC
- Season: 2016
- Champions: Maghery (1st S.F.C. Title)
- Relegated: Forkhill (7th in the IFL); Grange (8th in the IFL)
- Ulster SCFC: Maghery
- Winning Captain: ??? Ben Crealy=Man Of The Match
- ???

The 2016 Armagh Senior Football Championship is the 116th official edition of the Armagh GAA's premier club Gaelic football tournament for senior club in County Armagh. The tournament consists of 16 teams with the winner going on to represent Armagh in the Ulster Senior Club Football Championship. The championship has a back-door format for the first two rounds before proceeding to a knock-out format. Generally, any team to lose two matches will be knocked out of the championship.

Crossmaglen Rangers are the defending champions after they defeated Armagh Harps 2-22 to 0-10 in the 2015 final, however they were knocked out at the semi-final stage this season by close rivals St. Patrick's Cullyhanna. This was only Crossmaglen's second loss in 20 years of Armagh Senior championship football.

This was Clann Éireann, Madden and Grange's return to the senior grade.

Forkhill and Grange were relegated to the I.F.C. for 2017 after finishing 7th and 8th respectively in this year's Senior 'B' Football League. They will be replaced next year by Whitecross and Culloville Blues after they claimed the 2016 I.F.C. and I.A.F.L. titles respectively.

On 16 October 2016, Maghery Sean MacDermott's claimed their first ever S.F.C. title when defeating St. Patrick's Cullyhanna in the Athletic Grounds on a score line of 1-13 to 0-13.

== Promoted to SFC from IFC in 2015 ==
- Clann Éireann – (IFC & IFL Champions)
- Madden – (2nd in IFL)
- Grange – (3rd in IFL)

== Relegated from SFC to IFC in 2015 ==
- Killeavy – (16th SFL)
- Carrickcruppen – (15th SFL)
- St. Paul's – (14th SFL)

== Group stage ==
=== Round 1 ===
All 16 teams play in this round. The 8 winners progress to Round 2A while the 8 losers progress to Round 2B.

- Maghery 1-15 0-9 Annaghmore, Athletic Grounds, 19/8/2016
- Crossmaglen Rangers 2-13 1-10 Dromintee, Cullyhanna, 21/8/2016
- Clann Éireann 3-15 3-9 Madden, Pearse Óg Park, 21/8/2016
- Sarsfields 3-11 1-16 Forkhill, Ballymacnab, 21/8/2016
- Tír na nÓg 1-14 0-15 Granemore, Maghery, 21/8/2016
- Ballymacnab 1-15 0-16 Armagh Harps, Athletic Grounds, 26/8/2016
- Cullyhanna 2-20 1-5 Pearse Óg, Ballymavnab, 28/8/2016
- Wolfe Tones 3-15 2-16 Grange, Maghery, 28/8/2016

=== Round 2 ===
==== Round 2A ====
The 8 winners from Round 1 enter this round. The 4 winners enter the draw for the quarter-finals while the 4 losers play in Round 3.

- Clann Éireann 4-11 0-13 Ballymacnab, Athletic Grounds, 9/9/2016
- Maghery 0-12 0-7 Wolfe Tones, Clann Éireann Park, 10/9/2016
- Crossmaglen Rangers 6-20 0-8 Tír na nÓg, Athletic Grounds, 11/9/2016
- Cullyhanna 1-15 1-9 Sarsfields, Athletic Grounds, 11/9/2016

==== Round 2B ====
The 8 losers from Round 1 enter this round. The 4 winners advance to Round 3 while the 4 losers exit the Championship.

- Armagh Harps 2-16 0-9 Grange, Athletic Grounds, 9/9/2016
- Dromintee 0-15 0-11 Annaghmore, Abbey Park, 10/9/2016
- Pearse Óg 3-16 3-9 Madden, Ballymacnab, 10/9/2016
- Forkhill 4-8 0-9 Granemore, Silverbridge, 11/9/2016

=== Round 3 ===
The 4 losers from Round 2A play the 4 winners from Round 2B. The 4 winners enter the draw for the quarter-finals.

- Armagh Harps 3-17 3-14 Sarsfields, Athletic Grounds, 16/9/2016
- Ballymacnab 2-18 1-8 Pearse Óg, Athletic Grounds, 16/9/2016
- Dromintee 1-16 1-6 Tír na nÓg, Athletic Grounds, 19/9/2016
- Wolfe Tones 1-9 0-7 Forkhill, Athletic Grounds, 19/9/2016

== Knock-Out Stage ==
=== Last Eight Draw ===
Quarter-Finals		Semi-Finals		Final
Cullyhanna	1-13
Wolfe Tones	1-7	Cullyhanna	1-15
Crossmaglen Rangers	1-16	Crossmaglen Rangers	0-17
Armagh Harps	1-13			Cullyhanna	0-13
Maghery	1-15			Maghery	1-13
Dromintee	2-5	Maghery	2-17
Clann Eireann	0-11	Clann Eireann	1-9
Ballymacnab	0-10

=== Quarter-finals ===
The four winners from Round 2A play the four winners from Round 3. The 4 winners advance to the semi-finals.

- Clann Éireann 0-11, 0-10 Ballymacnab, Ballycrummy Road, 24/9/2016
- Crossmaglen Rangers 1-16, 1-13 Armagh Harps, Keady, 25/9/2016
- Maghery 1-15, 2-5 Dromintee, Athletic Grounds, 25/9/2016
- Cullyhanna 1-13, 1-7 Wolfe Tones, Ballymacnab, 25/9/2016

=== Semi-finals ===
- Maghery 2-17, 1-9 Clann Éireann, Athletic Grounds, 30/9/2016 Report
- Cullyhanna 1-15, 0-17 Crossmaglen Rangers, Athletic Grounds, 2/10/2016 Report

=== Final ===
16 October 2016
16:00
Final

Maghery	1-13 – 0-13	Cullyhanna
Aidan Forker 0-4 (0-2f), Ciaran Higgins 1-0, Stefan Forker 0-2 (0-1f), Gerard Campbell, Steven Fox, Conor Mackle,Ronan Lappin, Stephen Cusack, David Lavery, Seamus Forker 0-1 each	Report	Aidan Nugent 0-9 (0-6f), Barry McConville, Shea Hoey, Mal Mackin, Pearse Casey 0-1 each

Athletic Grounds
Attendance: 6,390
Referee: Padraig Hughes (Crossmaglen)
