= 2015 Armagh Senior Football Championship =

Armagh S.F.C.
- Season: 2015
- Champions: Crossmaglen Rangers; 43rd Senior Championship Title
- Relegated: Killeavy (16th S.F.L.); Carrickcruppen (15th S.F.L.); St. Paul's (14th S.F.L.)
- Ulster SCFC: Crossmaglen Rangers
- All Ireland SCFC: n/a
- Winning Captain: ???
- Man of the Match: ???
- Matches: ??

The 2015 Armagh Senior Football Championship is the 115th official edition of the Armagh GAA's premier club Gaelic football tournament for senior graded teams in County Armagh. The tournament consists of 16 teams with the winner going on to represent Armagh in the Ulster Senior Club Football Championship. The championship has a back-door format for the first two rounds before proceeding to a knock-out format. Generally, any team to lose two matches will be knocked out of the championship.

Crossmaglen Rangers were the defending champions after they defeated Armagh Harps in the previous years final, and they successfully defended their title and also claimed a six-in-a-row of titles (their 43rd altogether & their 19th in 20 years) when beating Armagh Harps again in the final at the Athletic Grounds on 11 October 2015 by 2-22 to 0-10.

This was St. Paul's, Wolfe Tones' and Forkhill's return to the senior grade.

Killeavy, Carrickcruppen and St. Paul's were relegated to the Intermediate grade for 2016.

== Team changes ==
The following teams have changed division since the 2015 championship season.

=== To S.F.C. ===
Promoted from I.F.C.

- St. Paul's - (I.F.C. & I.F.L. Champions)
- Wolfe Tones - (2nd in I.F.L.)
- Forkhill - (3rd in I.F.L.)

=== From S.F.C. ===
Relegated to I.F.C.

- Shane O'Neill's - (16th in S.F.L.)
- Whitecross- (15th in S.F.L.)
- Madden - (14th in S.F.L.)

== Round 1 ==
All 16 teams enter the competition in this round. The 8 winners progress to Round 2A while the 8 losers progress to Round 2B.

- Annaghmore 2-8, 0-11 Tír na nÓg, 8/5/2015,
- Pearse Óg 0-21, 4-4 Sarsfields, 8/5/2015,
- Killeavy 2-13, 0-8 Carrickcruppen, 9/5/2015,
- Ballymacnab 1-16, 1-11 Dromintee, 9/5/2015,
- Armagh Harps 1-15, 2-8 Wolfe Tones, 9/5/2015,
- Cullyhanna 2-12, 0-8 St. Paul's, 10/5/2015,
- Maghery 1-14, 0-9 Forkhill, 10/5/2015,
- Crossmaglen Rangers 4-15, 1-7 Granemore, 10/5/2015,

== Round 2 ==
=== Round 2A ===
The 8 winners from Round 1 enter this round. The 4 winners will enter the draw for the quarter-finals while the 4 losers will play in Round 3.

- Maghery 2-13, 0-8 Pearse Óg, 14/8/2015,
- Armagh Harps 0-13, 1-10 Cullyhanna, 17/8/2015,
- Annaghmore 1-12, 0-14 Ballymacnab, 22/8/2015,
- Crossmaglen Rangers 4-10, 0-10 Killeavy, 22/8/2015,
- Armagh Harps 3-14, 2-12 Cullyhanna, 22/8/2015, (Replay)

=== Round 2B ===
The 8 losers from Round 1 enter this round. The 4 winners will go into the Round 3 while the 4 losers will exit the Championship.

- Granemore 4-15, 4-8 Carrickcruppen, 16/8/2015,
- Wolfe Tones 4-15, 2-16 Tír na nÓg, 22/8/2015,
- Sarsfields 6-19, 2-14 Forkhill, 23/8/2015,
- Dromintee 1-14, 3-6 St. Paul's, 23/8/2015,

== Round 3 ==
The 4 losers from Round 2A enter this round and they play the 4 winners from Round 2B. The 4 winners will go into the draw for the quarter-finals.

- Granemore 1-11, 0-13 Cullyhanna, 28/8/2015,
- Killeavy 2-9, 1-11 Wolfe Tones, 29/8/2015,
- Ballymacnab 2-16, 1-17 Sarsfields, 30/8/2015,
- Pearse Óg 2-12, 1-5 Dromintee, 5/9/2015,

== Quarter-finals ==
The 4 winners from Round 2A enter this round and play the 4 winners from Round 3. The 4 winners will proceed to the semi-finals.

Quarter-Finals		Semi-Finals		Final
Ballymacnab	1-10
Annaghmore	1-9	Ballymacnab	2-10
Killeavy	1-9	Armagh Harps	2-16
Armagh Harps	0-22			Armagh Harps	0-10
Crossmaglen Rangers	1-14			Crossmaglen Rangers	2-22
Pearse Óg	2-6	Crossmaglen Rangers	1-18
Maghery	2-13	Maghery	0-9
Granemore	2-5

- Ballymacnab 1-10, 1-9 Annaghmore, 11/9/2015,
- Crossmaglen Rangers 1-14, 2-6 Pearse Óg, 13/9/2015,
- Maghery 2-13, 2-5 Granemore, 15/9/2015, Report
- Armagh Harps 0-22, 1-9 Killeavy, 19/9/2015, Report

== Semi-finals ==
- Crossmaglen Rangers 0-12, 0-9 Maghery, 26/9/2015,
- Armagh Harps 2-16, 2-10 Ballymacnab, 27/9/2015,

== Final ==
11 October 2015
16:00
Final

Armagh Harps	0-10 - 2-22	Crossmaglen Rangers
Gareth Swift 0-5f, Ultan Lennon 0-2, Karl Loughran, Declan McKenna, Ryan McShane 0-1 each	Report	Tony Kernan 0-5 (0-2f, 2 '45), Michael McNamee (0-1f) and Kyle Carragher 0-4 each, David McKenna 1-1, Rico Kelly 1-1, Paul Hughes and Martin Aherne 0-2 each, Johnny Hanratty, Stephen Kernan, Oisin O'Neill 0-1 each

Athletic Grounds
Referee: Oliver Hearty
