= List of Armagh senior Gaelic football team captains =

This article lists players who have captained the senior Armagh county football team in the Ulster Senior Football Championship and the All-Ireland Senior Football Championship. The captain, unlike some other counties, is not necessarily chosen from the club that has won the Armagh Senior Football Championship.

== List of captains ==
Year	Player	Club	National titles	Provincial titles
1999	Jarlath Burns	Silverbridge		Ulster Football Final winning captain
2000	Kieran McGeeney	Na Fianna		Ulster Football Final winning captain
2001	Kieran McGeeney	Na Fianna		
2002	Kieran McGeeney	Na Fianna	All-Ireland Football Final winning captain	Ulster Football Final winning captain
2003	Kieran McGeeney	Na Fianna		
2004	Kieran McGeeney	Na Fianna		Ulster Football Final winning captain
2005	Kieran McGeeney	Na Fianna		Ulster Football Final winning captain
2006	Kieran McGeeney	Na Fianna		Ulster Football Final winning captain
2008	Paul McGrane	Ballyhegan		Ulster Football Final winning captain
2007	Kieran McGeeney	Na Fianna		
2009	Ciarán McKeever	St Patrick's, Cullyhanna		
2010	Steven McDonnell	Killeavy	National Football League Division 2	
2011	Steven McDonnell	Killeavy		
2012	Ciarán McKeever	St Patrick's, Cullyhanna		
2013	Ciarán McKeever	St Patrick's, Cullyhanna		
2014				
2015				
2016				
2017				
2018				
2019				
2020				
2021				
2022	Aidan Nugent/Rian O'Neill			
2023				
2024	Aidan Forker	Sean MacDermott's, Maghery	All-Ireland Football Final winning captain	
