= 2018 Armagh Senior Football Championship =

Armagh S.F.C.
- Season: 2018
- Champions: Crossmaglen Rangers (44th SFC Title)
- Relegated: Whitecross St. Killian's (7th in the SBFL); Tír na nÓg Portadown (8th in the SBFL)
- All Ireland SCFC: n/a
- Winning Captain: ???
- Man of the Match: ???
- Winning Manager: ???
- Ulster SCFC: Crossmaglen Rangers

The 2018 Armagh Senior Football Championship is the 118th edition of Armagh GAA's premier gaelic football tournament for senior clubs in County Armagh, Northern Ireland. The winners represent Armagh in the Ulster Senior Club Football Championship.

The championship begins with sixteen teams competing in four groups of four teams before proceeding to a knock-out format. Prior to 2018 the competition had a back-door format. The winners receive the Gerry Fegan Cup.

Armagh Harps were the defending champions after they defeated Maghery Seán McDermott's in the 2017 final.

This was Killeavy St. Moninna's and Silverbridge Harps' return to the senior grade after they claimed the 2017 I.F.C. and I.A.F.L. titles respectively.

Whitecross St. Killian's and Tír na nÓg Portadown were relegated to the I.F.C. and I.A.F.L. for 2019 after they finished 7th and 8th in the S.B.F.L. respectively. They will be replaced by the I.F.C. & I.A.F.L. champions Lurgan St. Peter's as well as I.A.F.L. runners-up Culloville Blues.

Crossmaglen Rangers claimed their 44th S.F.C. title and their 20th in 23 years when defeating Ballymacnab 0–24 to 1–15 in the decider at the Athletic Grounds on 21 October 2018.

== Team changes ==
The following teams have changed division since the 2017 championship season.

=== Promoted To S.F.C. from I.F.C. ===
- Killeavy St Moninna's - (IFC Champions)
- Silverbridge Harps - (IAFL Champions)

=== Relegated to I.F.C. from S.F.C. ===
- Culloville Blues - (7th SBFL)
- Wolfe Tones - (8th SBFL)

== Group stage ==
All 16 teams enter the competition at this stage. The top 2 teams in each group go into the quarter-finals while the bottom team of each group enter the relegation playoffs. The team named first in each round listed below received home advantage.

=== Group A ===
Team	Pld	W	L	D	PF	PA	PD	Pts
Ballymacnab Round Towers	3	3	0	0	75	31	+44	6
Dromintee St. Patrick's	3	2	1	0	53	44	+9	4
High Moss Sarsfields	3	1	2	0	57	55	-2	2
Whitecross St. Killian's	3	0	3	0	19	74	-55	0

Round 1

- Whitecross 0–7, 1-13 Dromintee, 24/8/2018,
- Sarsfields 1–11, 3-14 Ballymacnab, 25/8/2018,

Round 2

- Whitecorss 0–2, 5-17 Ballymacnab, 31/8/2018,
- Dromintee 2-16, 1-14 Sarsfields, 1/9/2018,

Round 3

- Sarsfields 3-17, 1-7 Whitecross, 8/9/2018,
- Ballymacnab 2-14, 2-9 Dromintee, 8/9/2018,

=== Group B ===
Team	Pld	W	L	D	PF	PA	PD	Pts
Crossmaglen Rangers	3	3	0	0	61	39	+22	6
Silverbridge Harps	3	1	2	0	39	34	+5	2
Madden Rapparees	3	1	2	0	51	56	-5	2
Clann Éireann	3	1	2	0	41	63	-22	2

Round 1

- Silverbridge 0–11, 0-12 Crossmaglen, 24/8/2018,
- Madden 2–12, 4-12 Clann Éireann, 25/8/2018,

Round 2

- Clann Éireann 0–10, 1-15 Silverbridge, 1/9/2018,
- Madden 2–15, 2-16 Crossmaglen, 1/9/2018,

Round 3

- Silverbridge 0–10, 1-9 Madden, 8/9/2018,
- Crossmaglen 4-15, 0-7 Clann Éireann, 8/9/2018,

=== Group C ===
Team	Pld	W	L	D	PF	PA	PD	Pts
Maghery Seán McDermott's	3	2	0	1	44	29	+15	5
Armagh Harps	3	2	1	0	46	37	+9	4
Killeavy St. Moninna's	3	1	2	0	32	45	-13	2
Annaghmore Pearses	3	0	2	1	26	37	-11	1

Round 1

- Annaghmore 0–8, 0-16 Armagh Harps, 24/8/2018,
- Killeavy 0–6, 2-14 Maghery, 25/8/2018,

Round 2

- Annaghmore 0–12, 1-9 Maghery, 31/8/2018,
- Armagh Harps 3-10, 1-14 Killeavy, 1/9/2018,

Round 3

- Maghery 0-12, 0-11 Armagh Harps, 9/9/2018,
- Killeavy 0-9, 0-6 Annaghmore, 9/9/2018,

=== Group D ===
Team	Pld	W	L	D	PF	PA	PD	Pts
St. Patrick's Cullyhanna	3	3	0	0	75	31	+44	6
Pearse Óg's	3	2	1	0	53	44	+9	4
Granemore St. Mary's	3	1	2	0	57	55	-2	2
Tír na nÓg Portadown	3	0	3	0	19	74	-55	0

Round 1

- Tír na nÓg 0–5, 1-12 Granemore, 24/8/2018,
- Pearse Óg 2–11, 3-16 Cullyhanna, 25/8/2018,

Round 2

- Granemore 0–15, 2-16 Pearse Óg, 31/8/2018,
- Tír na nÓg 0–7,2-18 Cullyhanna, 1/9/2018,

Round 3

- Pearse Óg 2-12, 0-10 Tír na nÓg, 9/9/2018,
- Cullyhanna 3-17, 0-7 Granemore, 9/9/2018

== Knock-Out Stage ==
=== Quarter-finals ===
21 September 2018	Ballymacnab	1-10 - 0-3	Killeavy	Athletic Grounds; Referee: ??? Man of the Match: ???

22 September 2018	Crossmaglen Rangers	2-22 - 1-15	Armagh Harps	Athletic Grounds; Referee: ??? Man of the Match: ???

23 September 2018	Cullyhanna	2-13 - 0-7	Silverbridge	Crossmaglen; Referee: ??? Man of the Match: ???

24 September 2018	Maghery	2-15 - 0-4	Madden	Athletic Grounds; Referee: ??? Man of the Match: ???

=== Semi-finals ===
5 October 2018	Ballymacnab	1-9 – 0-9	Maghery	Athletic Grounds; Referee: ??? Man of the Match: ???

7 October 2018	Crossmaglen Rangers	0-19 - 1-11	Cullyhanna	Athletic Grounds; Referee: ??? Man of the Match: ???

=== Final ===
21 October 2018	Crossmaglen Rangers	0-24 - 1-15	Ballymacnab	Athletic Grounds
