= 2019 Armagh Senior Football Championship =

Armagh S.F.C.
- Season: 2019
- Champions: Crossmaglen Rangers (45th S.F.C. Title)
- Relegated: Sarsfields (7th in the SBFL); Culloville Blues (8th in the SBFL)
- All Ireland SCFC: n/a
- Winning Captain: Andy Kernan
- Man of the Match: Rian O'Neill
- Winning Manager: Kieran Donnelly
- Ulster SCFC: ???

The 2019 Armagh Senior Football Championship is the 119th edition of Armagh GAA's premier gaelic football tournament for senior clubs in County Armagh, Northern Ireland. The winners represent Armagh in the Ulster Senior Club Football Championship.

The championship begins with sixteen teams competing in four groups of four teams before proceeding to a knock-out format with the overall winners receiving the Gerry Fegan Cup.

Crossmaglen Rangers were the defending champions after they defeated Ballymacnab in the 2018 final. They successfully defended their title when defeating the same opposition in the final on 20 October at the Athletic Grounds to claim their record 45th title.

This was St. Peter's Lurgan's and Culloville Blues' return to the senior grade after they claimed the 2017 I.F.C./I.A.F.L. titles and second in I.A.F.L., respectively.

High Moss Sarsfields and Culloville Blues were relegated to the I.F.C. and I.A.F.L. for 2020 after they finished seventh and eighth in the S.B.F.L. respectively. They will be replaced by the I.F.C. champions Grange St. Colmcille's as well as I.A.F.L. champions Mullaghbawn Cuchulainn's.

== Team changes ==
The following teams have changed division since the 2019 championship season.

=== Promoted To S.F.C. from I.F.C. ===
- St. Peter's Lurgan - (IFC & IAFL Champions)
- Culloville Blues - (2nd IAFL)

=== Relegated to I.F.C. from S.F.C. ===
- Whitecross St. Killian's - (7th SBFL)
- Tír na nÓg Portadown - (8th SBFL)

== Group stage ==
All 16 teams enter the competition at this stage. The top 2 teams in each group go into the quarter-finals while the bottom team of each group enter the relegation playoffs. The team named first in each round listed below received home advantage.

=== Group A ===
Team	Pld	W	L	D	PF	PA	PD	Pts
Crossmaglen Rangers	3	3	0	0	75	47	+28	6
Ballymacnab Round Towers	3	2	1	0	76	48	+28	4
High Moss Sarsfields	3	0	2	1	56	69	-13	1
Clann Éireann Lurgan	3	0	2	1	41	84	-43	1

Round 1

- Sarsfields 2-8, 2-17 Ballymacnab, 16/8/2019,
- Clann Éireann 0-9, 3-18 Crossmaglen Rangers, 17/8/2019,

Round 2

- Ballymacnab 5-20, 0-10 Clann Éireann, 23/8/2019,
- Crossmaglen Rangers 2-18, 3-11 Sarsfields, 25/8/2019,

Round 3

- Crossmaglen Rangers 3-15, 2-12 Ballymacnab, 8/9/2019,
- Clann Éireann 1-19, 2-16 Sarsfields, 8/9/2019,

=== Group B ===
Team	Pld	W	L	D	PF	PA	PD	Pts
Granemore St. Mary's	3	3	0	0	42	35	+7	6
Silverbridge Harps	3	2	1	0	56	41	+15	4
Armagh Harps	3	1	2	0	53	48	+5	2
St. Peter's Lurgan	3	0	3	0	24	50	-26	0

Round 1

- St. Peter's 0-6, 2-13 Silverbridge, 17/8/2019,
- Granemore 0-15, 1-11 Armagh Harps, 17/8/2019,

Round 2

- Silverbridge 0-14, 1-12 Granemore, 23/8/2019,
- St. Peter's 1-8, 0-19 Armagh Harps, 24/8/2019,

Round 3

- Armagh Harps 4-8, 1-19 Silverbridge, 8/9/2019,
- Granemore 1-9, 0-7 St. Peter's, 8/9/2019,

=== Group C ===
Team	Pld	W	L	D	PF	PA	PD	Pts
Maghery Seán McDermott's	3	2	1	0	41	28	+13	4
Madden Rapparees	3	2	1	0	42	37	+5	4
Dromintee St. Patrick's	3	2	1	0	37	43	-6	4
Annaghmore Pearses	3	0	3	0	31	43	-12	0

Round 1

- Annaghmore 1-6, 0-12 Dromintee, 16/8/2019,
- Madden 1-9, 0-6 Maghery, 17/8/2019,

Round 2

- Annaghmore 0-8, 0-12 Maghery, 23/8/2019,
- Dromintee 1-14, 0-11 Madden, 24/8/2019,

Round 3

- Maghery 4-11, 0-8 Dromintee, 7/9/2019,
- Madden 1-16, 1-11 Annaghmore, 7/9/2019,

=== Group D ===
Team	Pld	W	L	D	PF	PA	PD	Pts
Pearse Óg	3	3	0	0	63	40	+23	6
St. Patrick's Cullyhanna	3	2	1	0	43	38	+15	4
Killeavy St. Moninna's	3	1	2	0	48	39	+9	2
Culloville Blues	3	0	3	0	38	75	-37	0

Round 1

- Culloville Blues 0-8, 1-11 Cullyhanna, 16/8/2019,
- Pearse Óg 0-11, 0-9 Killeavy, 19/8/2019,

Round 2

- Cullyhanna 0-14, 3-13 Pearse Óg, 25/8/2019,
- Culloville Blues 1-10, 6-13 Killeavy, 26/8/2019,

Round 3

- Killeavy 1-5, 1-12 Cullyhanna, 7/9/2019,
- Pearse Óg 4-18, 2-11 Culloville Blues, 7/9/2019,

== Knock-Out Stage ==
=== Quarter-finals ===
21 September 2019	Ballymacnab Round Towers	2-12 - 0-10	Pearse Óg	Athletic Grounds; Referee: ??? Man of the Match: ???

21 September 2019	Granemore St. Mary's	0-11 - 0-10	Madden Rapparees	Athletic Grounds; Referee: ??? Man of the Match: ???

22 September 2019	Crossmaglen Rangers	1-15 - 0-7	Silverbridge Harps	Cullyhanna; Referee: ??? Man of the Match: ???

23 September 2019	Maghery Seán McDermott's	2-9 - 1-9	St. Patrick's Cullyhanna	Athletic Grounds; Referee: ??? Man of the Match: ???

=== Semi-finals ===
5 October 2019	Ballymacnab Round Towers	0-16 – 0-13 (a.e.t)	Granemore St. Mary's	Athletic Grounds; Referee: ??? Man of the Match: ???

5 October 2019	Crossmaglen Rangers	2-9 - 0-8	Maghery Seán McDermott's	Athletic Grounds; Referee: ??? Man of the Match: ???

=== Final ===
20 October 2019; 16:00	Crossmaglen Rangers	2-18 - 2-9	Ballymacnab Round Towers	Athletic Grounds; Referee: Jake Magill
