= 2020 Armagh Senior Football Championship =

Armagh S.F.C.
- Season: 2020
- Champions: Maghery Seán MacDermott's (2nd S.F.C. Title)
- Relegated: ??? (7th in the SBFL) ??? (8th in the SBFL)
- All Ireland SCFC: n/a
- Winning Captain: David Lavery
- Man of the Match: Aidan Forker
- Winning Manager: ???
- Ulster SCFC: ???

The 2020 Armagh Senior Football Championship is the 120th edition of Armagh GAA's premier gaelic football tournament for senior clubs in County Armagh, Northern Ireland. The winners will not represent Armagh in the Ulster Senior Club Football Championship as the Club Championships were cancelled for 2020 due to the COVID-19 pandemic.

The original championship format was for all sixteen teams to compete in four groups of four teams before proceeding to a knock-out format with the overall winners receiving the Gerry Fegan Cup. Due to the emergence of the COVID-19 pandemic however, clubs were asked by the Armagh County Board to back the proposal to run a straight-knockout championship, which was passed.

Crossmaglen Rangers were the defending champions after they defeated Ballymacnab Round Towers in the 2019 final.

This was Grange St. Colmcille's and Mullaghbawn Cuchulainns' return to the senior grade after they claimed the 2019 I.F.C./I.A.F.L. titles and second in I.A.F.L. respectively.

Maghery Seán MacDermott's won their second Armagh Senior Football Championship by defeating Crossmaglen Rangers 4–9 to 0–17 in the final.

== Team changes ==
The following teams have changed division since the 2019 championship season.

=== Promoted To S.F.C. from I.F.C. ===
- Grange St. Colmcille's - (I.F.C. Champions)
- Mullaghbawn Cuchulainns - (I.A.F.L. Champions)

=== Relegated to I.F.C. from S.F.C. ===
- Sarsfields - (7th S.B.F.L.)
- Culloville Blues - (8th S.B.F.L.)

== Round 1 ==
7 August 2020; Round 1	Clann Éireann Lurgan	2-8 - 1-10	Granemore St. Mary's

7 August 2020; Round 1	Mullaghbawn Cuchulainns	4-13 - 0-13	Annaghmore Pearses

8 August 2020; Round 1	Killeavy St. Moninna's	2-15 - 0-14	Grange St. Colmcille's

8 August 2020; Round 1	Maghery Seán McDermott's	1-13 - 1-9	Dromintee St. Patrick's

8 August 2020; Round 1	Madden Rapparees	2-16 - 2-12	Ballymacnab Round Towers

9 August 2020; Round 1	Armagh Harps	2-21 - 2-11	St. Peter's Lurgan

9 August 2020; Round 1	Crossmaglen Rangers	3-10 - 1-8	Silverbridge Haprs

9 August 2020; Round 1	Pearse Óg	1-11 - 0-12	St. Patrick's Cullyhanna

== Quarter-finals ==
- Pearse Óg win 5 - 3 on penalties.

15 August 2020; Quarter-Final	Pearse Óg	0-17 - 2-11 (a.e.t.)	Madden Raparees	Athletic Grounds

16 August 2020; Quarter-Final	Crossmaglen Rangers	4-18 - 0-10	Mullaghabawn Cúchulainns	Athletic Grounds

16 August 2020; Quarter-Final	Killeavy St. Moninna's	0-17 - 0-9	Armagh Harps	Athletic Grounds

17 August 2020; Quarter-Final	Maghery Seán McDermott's	0-13 - 0-12	Clann Éireann Lurgan	Athletic Grounds

== Semi-finals ==
29 August 2020; 19:00; Semi-Final	Maghery Seán MacDermott's	1-12 - 0-10	Pearse Óg	Athletic Grounds

30 August 2020; 17:30; Semi-Final	Crossmaglen Rangers	0-15 - 0-13	Killeavy St. Moninna's	Athletic Grounds

== Final ==
13 September 2020; 16:00; Final	Crossmaglen Rangers	0-17 - 4-9	Maghery Seán MacDermott's	Athletic Grounds
