= Clann Éireann GAC =

Armagh-based Gaelic games club

- CLG Clann Éireann
- Founded: 1910
- County: Armagh
- Colours: Orange and White
- Grounds: Clann Éireann Park
- Coordinates: 54.47091°N 6.330786°W

Playing kits
Standard colours

Senior Club Championships
| | All Ireland | Ulster champions | Armagh champions |
|---|---|---|---|
| Football: | - | - | 4 |
| Ladies' football: | – | 2 | ? |

Clann Éireann GAC is a Gaelic Athletic Association club based in Lurgan, in County Armagh, Northern Ireland. Clann Éireann GAC, part of Armagh GAA, incorporates a youth club. With a total membership of 1,500, the youth club and GAC provide a wide range of sporting, social and developmental activities throughout the year. The GAC provides Gaelic football and handball for boys and girls of all age groups from under 8s to senior level.

== History ==
Formed in 1910, the club was only officially named "Clann Éireann" ([klˠan̪ˠ ˈiːɾʲən̪ˠ], "Children/Clan of Ireland") in 1937 after numerous name changes.

== Gaelic football ==
Clann Éireann won the Armagh Junior Football Championship in 1945.

In the 1954 Armagh Senior Football Championship final, Clann Éireann secured its first Senior title by defeating the neighbouring club, Clan na Gael, by 2–04 to a single point. The dismal performance of Clan na Gael was despite its hosting the match. After a frustrating sequence of SFC final losses in 1959-62 (including the replay of the drawn 1960 decider), Clann Éireann again won the Senior title in 1963, defeating Crossmaglen 3–06 to 1-04.

The club won the Armagh Intermediate Football Championship in 1977, defeating Culloville 1–13 to 1-05. The IFC title returned to the club in 2002, when they beat Carrickcruppen by 1–11 to 0-09. In 2015 the IFC title was again Clann Éireann's as they defeated Whitecross 2–13 to 2–8.

In 2021 the club won the Armagh Senior Football Championship for the third time defeating Crossmaglen 2-12 to 0-16 at the Athletic Grounds in Armagh.

== Facilities ==
The associated youth club, founded in 1954, celebrated its 50th anniversary in 2004.

== Notable players ==
- Barry McCambridge
- Tiernan Kelly
- Alf Murray
- Conor Turbitt

== Honours ==
- Armagh Senior Football Championship (4)
  - 1954, 1963, 2021,2024; Runners-up 1959, 1960, 1961, 1962, 1965, 1968
- Armagh Intermediate Football Championship (3)
  - 1977, 2002, 2015; Runners-up 1976
- Armagh Junior Football Championship (2)
  - 1945, 2023
- Ulster Ladies' Senior Club Football Championship (2)
  - 2023, 2024
