= Armagh Junior Football Championship =

Annual Gaelic football competition

- Irish: Craobh Sóiseareach Peile Ard Mhacha
- Founded: 1925
- Trophy: Sean Quinn Perpetual Cup
- Title holders: Ballyhegan (5th title)
- Most titles: Keady Collegeland (5 titles)
- Sponsors: Cormac Leonard Commercials

Armagh Junior B Football Championship
- Irish: Craobh Sóiseareach Peile B
- Founded: 2025
- Trophy: Junior B trophy,
- Sponsors: Cormac Leonard Commercials

The Armagh Junior Football Championship is an annual Gaelic football competition contested by lower-tier Armagh GAA clubs. The Armagh County Board of the Gaelic Athletic Association has organised it since 1925. The national media covers the competition.

Clonmore are the title holders (2025) defeating Middletown in the final

== History ==
From the launch of the Junior Championship in 1925 until 2013, five clubs won the title four times, with 42 other clubs winning it at least once.

The 2020 final went to a replay.

In 2025 a new competition was added the Junior B championship to cater for the growing number of second teams competing at junior level. Currently the two best positioned teams in the league who are a seconds team are able to compete in the main Junior Football Championship

== Honours ==
The trophy presented to the winners is the Sean Quinn Perpetual Cup. The Armagh JFC winners qualify for the Ulster Junior Club Football Championship. It is the only team from County Armagh to qualify for this competition. The Armagh JFC winners may enter the Ulster Junior Club Football Championship at either the preliminary round or the quarter-final stage. 2005's winning club Clonmore advanced to that year's Ulster Club JFC final. 2012's winning club An Port Mór went on to win the 2012 Ulster Club JFC.

The Armagh JFC winners — by winning the Ulster Junior Club Football Championship — may qualify for the All-Ireland Junior Club Football Championship, at which they would enter at the semi-final stage, providing they haven't been drawn to face the British champions in the quarter-finals.

== List of finals ==
Year	Winner	Score	Opponent	Score
1925	Keady			
1926	Crossmaglen Rangers			
1927	Keady			
1928	Young Irelands			
1929	Young Irelands			
1930	Wolfe Tone			
1931	Clan na Gael			
1932	Killeavy			
1933	Keady			
1934	Jonesborough			
1935	Whitecross			
1936	Bessbrook			
1937	Maghery		Silverbridge	
1938	Bessbrook			
1939	Newtownhamilton			
1940	Whitecross			
1941	Shane O'Neill's	0-10	Ballyhegan	1-02
1942	Mullaghbawn			
1943	Crossmaglen Rangers			
1944	Crossmaglen Rangers			
1945	Clann Éireann			
1946	Newtownhamilton		Ballymacnab	
1947	St Peter's			
1948	Clan na Gael			
1949	Sarsfields			
1950	Newtownhamilton			
1951	Culloville Blues			
1952	Pearse Óg			
1953	Madden			
1954	Blackwatertown			
1955	Ballyhegan			
1956	Collegeland			
1957	Harps			
1958	Maghery			
1959	Silverbridge		Ballyhegan	
1960	Mullaghbawn			
1961	Ballyhegan			
1962	Maghery			
1963	Derrynoose			
1964†	Thomas Williams†			
1965	Tír na nÓg			
1966	Dromintee			
1967	St Peter's			
1968	Clan na Gael II			
1969	Whitecross		Ballymacnab	
1970	Annaghmore			
1971	Granemore		Ballymacnab	
1972	Grange		Ballymacnab	
1973	Derrynoose			
1974	Middletown			
1975	Culloville Blues			
1976	Keady			
1977	Clady			
1978	St Paul's, Lurgan			
1979	Grange			
1980	Killeavy			
1981	Forkhill			
1982	Corrinshego	2-09	Clonmore	1-06
1983	Mullaghbrack			
1984	Dromintee			
1985	Éire Óg			
1986	Mullaghbawn			
1987	St Michael's			
1988	Collegeland			
1989	Annaghmore			
1990	Granemore			
1991	An Port Mór		Madden	
1992	Clady			
1993	Madden		Ballymacnab	
1994	Shane O'Neill's	1-13	Ballymacnab	2-08
1995	Ballyhegan			
1996	Whitecross			
1997	O'Hanlon's		Wolfe Tone	
1998	Granemore			
1999	Ballymacnab	2-05	Belleeks	0-07
2000	Wolfe Tone		Tullysaran GAC	
2001	Belleeks			
2002	Crossmaglen II			
2003	Annaghmore			
2004	Lissummon			
2005	Clonmore		An Port Mór	
2006	An Port Mór		Collegeland	
2007	Collegeland		Clady	
2008	Middletown		Grange	
2009	Shane O'Neill's	0-13 (0-12)	Belleeks	0-07 (2-06)
2010	Grange		Tullysaran	
2011	Éire Óg	3-07	Clonmore	1-06
2012	An Port Mór	2-11	Annaghmore	2-08
2013	Annaghmore	0-12	Clonmore	1-05
2014	Keady	2-10	Collegeland	0-06
2015	Tullysaran	1-13	Clonmore	0-08
2016	Clonmore	1-10 (0-12)	St Patrick's II	0-10 (1-09)
2017	Ballyhegan	1-14	Corrinshego	1-11
2018	Keady	0-18	An Port Mór	0-13
2019	Collegeland	1-12	Derrynoose St Mochua's	1-09
2020	Forkhill	3-10 (1-12)	Belleeks	1-10 (2-09)
2021	Belleeks	0-12	Crossmaglen II	0-09
2022	Derrynoose St Mochua's	2-14	Lissummon	0-07
2023	Clann Eireann II	4-12	Ballyhagen	1-08
2024	Collegeland	0-11	An Port Mór	0-11
2025	Clonmore	0-14 (0-10)	Middletown	0-10 (0-10)
2026	Ballyhegan	5-13	Collegeland	2-05

Notes

† The 1964 winner was probably an amalgamated Dorsey and Cullyhanna team, Tom Williams GFC.
