= Kieran McGeeney =

Irish Gaelic footballer and manager

Personal information
- Native name: Ciarán Mac Géibheannaigh (Irish)
- Nickname: Geezer
- Born: 18 October 1971 (age 55) Mullaghbawn, County Armagh
- Occupation: Gaelic football manager
- Height: 6 ft 0 in (183 cm)

Sport
- Sport: Gaelic football
- Position: Centre half-back
Club
- Years: Club
- 1980s–2000s: Mullaghbawn
Club titles
- Armagh titles: 1 & 3 Dublin
- Ulster titles: 1 & 1 Leinster
Inter-county
- Years: County
- 1992–2007: Armagh
Inter-county titles
- Ulster titles: 6
- All-Irelands: 1
- NFL: 1
- All Stars: 3

Kieran McGeeney (born 18 October 1971) is an Irish Gaelic football manager and former player, who currently manages his native county team, Armagh, having previously managed the senior Kildare county team from 2007 until 2013.

McGeeney played football with his local club Mullaghbawn Cúchullain's in Armagh and also for Na Fianna club in Dublin. He played at senior level for the Armagh county team from 1992 until 2007, captaining the county to the 2002 All-Ireland Senior Football Championship, their first title. In 2024, he managed Armagh to their second title.

== Playing career ==
=== Club ===
Born at Mullaghbawn, County Armagh, McGeeney was a member of Mullaghbawn's 1995 Armagh Senior Football Championship and Ulster Senior Club Football Championship winning side. He later moved to Na Fianna on the northside of Dublin. With them he won the 1999 Leinster Senior Club Football Championship and three Dublin Senior Football Championships.

=== Inter-county ===
McGeeney captained Armagh to a first All-Ireland SFC title in the team's history in 2002.

He won three All Stars Awards (1999, 2000 and 2002) and six Ulster Senior Football Championship medals (1999, 2000, 2002, 2004, 2005, 2006).

He also received the 2002 Texaco Footballer of the Year award.

=== International rules ===
McGeeney represented Ireland on a number of occasions against Australia, captaining his country in the 2006 International Rules Series. He led the Irish team who faced Australia in the first test at Pearse Stadium and in the second test at Croke Park. Since his debut in 1998, McGeeney made twelve appearances for his country.

== Managerial career ==
McGeeney managed the Kildare senior football team from 2007 until 2013. He was appointed shortly after retiring as an inter-county player.

He led the county to a Leinster final appearance in 2009. The team also reached the 2010 All-Ireland SFC semi-final in 2010, losing narrowly to Down. In 2013, McGeeney managed the Kildare under-21 team to the Leinster Under-21 Football Championship title.

He was axed after losing a ballot by county delegates by one vote, 29 to 28 in September 2013.

In October 2013, McGeeney joined the management team of the Armagh senior football team under Paul Grimley.

In November 2013, it was announced that McGeeney would be involved with the Tipperary hurling team for 2014 as a member of the back room team.

McGeeney took over from Paul Grimley as manager of his native Armagh in 2015.

By 2023, he had become the longest serving inter-county manager after Colm Collins stepped down as Clare manager when his team exited the championship in June.

In 2024, McGeeney managed Armagh to their second ever All-Ireland Championship victory making him both an All-Ireland winning captain and manager.

In 2026, Kieran finally overcame the county's 19 year wait of accomplishing Ulster glory after beating Monaghan in the 2026 Ulster Senior Football Championship Final to claim the Anglo Celt cup. Armagh's last Anglo Celt cup win was 2008.

McGeeney has been backed by the county board to continue his leadership in the 2027 season

== Personal life ==
He is fond of the MMA fighting. and jiu jitsu.

According to Peter Queally in November 2021: "Kieran McGeeney, this Armagh [Gaelic] footballer, was training there [at the Straight Blast Gym in Dublin] at the time and he was good at jiu jitsu. At the end of the night I was wrecked and ready to pack up and John [Kavanagh, Straight Blast Gym founder] said get back on the mat and points at McGeeney. I'll never forget that 10 minutes. It was the most horrific 10 minutes of my life. I cannot describe to you how bad it was. There's one thing I can vividly remember. Kieran was on top of me and I'm not messing, he started putting his hand underneath my rib cage and I am not messing, his hand was inside my body. He was pulling on my ribs. I thought I was going to break my ribs and I was going to tap, but I didn't. I couldn't bring myself to do it. I kind of knew what was going on, even though John didn't say anything, it felt like a big set-up". According to the BBC, "It was just that. Kavanagh had told Kieran McGeeney — a legend in the GAA world — to 'torture' Queally, to see if he was serious about becoming an MMA fighter".

== Honours ==
- In May 2020, the Irish Independent named McGeeney as one of the "dozens of brilliant players" who narrowly missed selection for its "Top 20 footballers in Ireland over the past 50 years".

Sporting positions
Preceded by Jarlath Burns	Armagh Senior Football Captain; 2000–2005	Succeeded by Paul McGrane
Preceded by John Crofton	Kildare Senior Football Manager; 2007–2013	Succeeded by Jason Ryan
Preceded by Paul Grimley	Armagh Senior Football Manager; 2015–	Succeeded by Incumbent
Achievements
Preceded by Gary Fahey (Galway)	All-Ireland Senior Football Championship winning captain 2002	Succeeded by Peter Canavan (Tyrone)
Awards
Preceded by Declan Meehan (Galway)	Vodafone Footballer of the Year; 2002	Succeeded by Steven McDonnell (Armagh)
Preceded by Pádraic Joyce (Galway)	Texaco Footballer of the Year; 2002	Succeeded by Peter Canavan (Tyrone)
Preceded by Pádraic Joyce (Galway)	Gaelic Players' Association; Footballer of the Year; 2002	Succeeded by Steven McDonnell (Armagh)
