= Mullaghbawn Cúchullain's GFC =

Armagh-based Gaelic games club

Mullaghbawn Cúchulainn's GFC
- Cúchulainn CLG, Mullach Bán
- Founded: 1934
- County: Armagh
- Colours: Green and gold
- Grounds: Cuchulainn Park (Páirc Chú Chulainn)

Playing kits
Standard colours

Mullaghbawn Cúchulainn's Gaelic Football Club (Irish: Cúchulainn CLG, Mullach Bán) is a GAA club in Mullaghbawn, southern County Armagh, Northern Ireland. It is part of Armagh GAA, and plays at Chucullain Park (Irish: Páirc Chú Chulainn). It plays Gaelic football in the Armagh Senior Football Championship.

== History ==
A team from Mullaghbawn lost the 1917 Armagh Senior championship final (played in March 1918) to Young Irelands of Armagh.

The club was founded in 1934, winning the Junior county league in 1938 and Junior championship in 1942. Also in 1942, Mullaghbawn reached the Senior final, losing to Armagh St Malachy's.

The Mullaghbawn club ceased to exist in 1947 but was reformed some years later. It won the Junior championship in 1960, and the club's first Senior title in 1964, beating Wolfe Tone. Mullaghbawn reached the final of the Armagh Intermediate championship in 1968, losing heavily to St Peter's GAC, Lurgan. Two years later it lost the IFC by a single point to Madden.

The club reformed again in 1979. In that year it again made it to the IFC final, losing to St Patrick's, Cullyhanna. After winning the Junior title in 1986, Mullaghbawn returned to the Intermediate level. Further IFC final losses came in 1988, again to Cullyhanna, and 1989, to Dromintee, but in 1992 Mullaghbawn at last won the IFC, beating Middletown Eoghan Rua by 2–8 to 1–5.

Promoted to the Senior ranks again, the Cúchulainns lost the 1994 SFC final to Lurgan's Clan na Gael, but its high point to date came in 1995, when it beat Armagh Harps in the county final, and went on to win the Ulster Senior Club championship, defeating Bailieborough Shamrocks of Cavan. Since then Mullaghbawn has appeared in the 1997 and 2005 SFC finals, falling on both occasions to Crossmaglen. Mullaghbawn would spend 10 years in the Intermediate ranks, from 2007 to 2017, reaching an Intermediate Championship Final appearance in 2018, ultimately losing to St Peters Lurgan. Mullaghbawn would reach Senior status again in 2018. They soon reached 1A status in 2022 but were relegated to 1B for the 2023 season but soon bounced back in 2024 by again reaching 1A status.

== Notable players ==
- Kieran McGeeney, Armagh player 1992–2007, captained Armagh to the All-Ireland title in 2002, winner of three All Stars and 2002 Footballer of the Year, subsequently manager of Kildare. Currently manager of Armagh, managing them to the All-Ireland title in 2024.
- Justin McNulty, Armagh player 1995–2005, subsequently manager of Laois. All-Ireland winner in 2002.
- Enda McNulty, Armagh player 1996–2010, All Star 2002. All-Ireland winner in 2002.
- Benny Tierney, former Armagh goalkeeper, member of 2002 All-Ireland team

== Roll of honour ==
- Ulster Senior Club Football Championship (1)
  - 1995
- Armagh Senior Football Championship (2)
  - 1964, 1995
- Armagh Senior Football League 1B (1)
  - 2024
- Armagh Intermediate Football Championship (1)
  - 1992
- Armagh Junior Football Championship (3)
  - 1942, 1960, 1986
- Armagh Junior All-County Football League (1)
  - 1938
- Armagh Under-21 Football Championship
  - 1990, 2017
