= Jarlath Burns =

Armagh Gaelic footballer and administrator

- Iarlaith Ó Broin
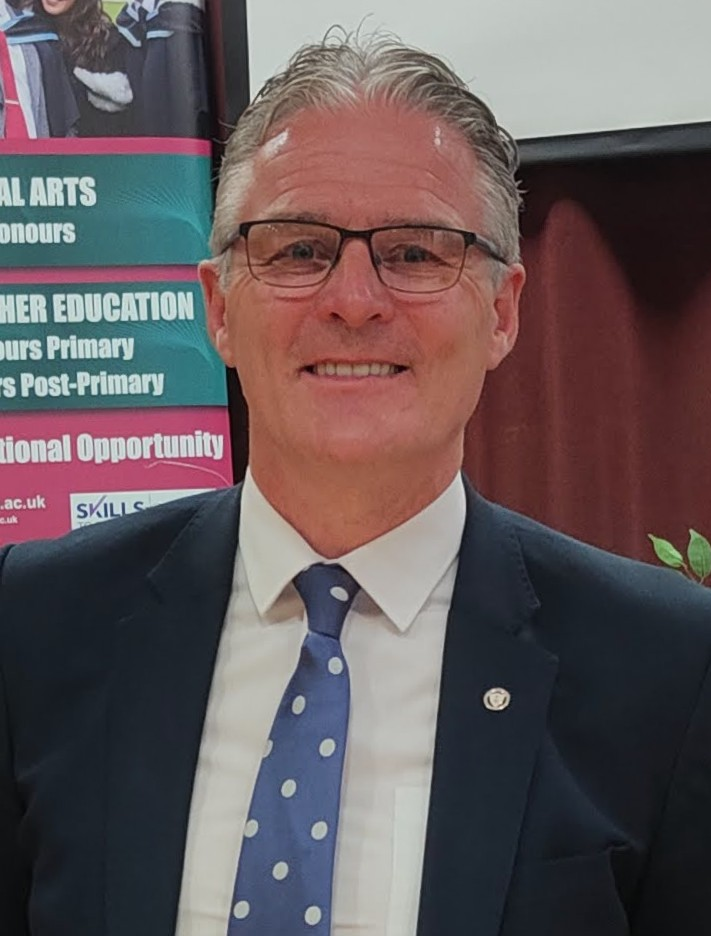

President of the Gaelic Athletic Association
- Incumbent
- Assumed office 24 February 2024
- Preceded by: Larry McCarthy

Personal details
- Born: 1968 (age 57–58) Silverbridge, County Armagh, Northern Ireland
- Gaelic games career
- Height: 6 ft 3 in (191 cm)
- Sport: Gaelic football
- Position: Midfield
Club
- Years: Club
- Silverbridge Harps
Club titles
- Armagh titles: 0
Inter-county
- Years: County
- 1987–1999: Armagh
Inter-county titles
- Ulster titles: 1
- All-Irelands: 0
- NFL: 0
- All Stars: 0

Jarlath Burns (Irish: Iarlaith Ó Broin; born 1968) is an Irish former Gaelic footballer and current president of the Gaelic Athletic Association (GAA). His league and championship career at inter-county level with the Armagh senior team spanned thirteen seasons from 1987 until 1999.

== Pre-GAA presidency ==
Burns made his senior inter-county debut for Armagh in 1987. He captained Armagh to an Ulster SFC title in 1999. As a player, he also won two McKenna Cup titles.

Burns managed Ireland to victory against Australia in the 2006 Ladies' International Rules Series.

After retiring from playing, he became involved in the administrative affairs of the GAA. He served as an underage manager, club chairman and secretary with his local club. At county level, Burns was Armagh's Central Council delegate from 2010 to 2015. His involvement with the GAA at national level began in 2000 when he was appointed as the first players' representative to Central Council. Since then, he has been involved in Scór, the GAA's medical and welfare committee, the GAA 125 anniversary committee and the pitch presentations committee, and he chaired the standing committee on playing rules. In 2012, he was in charge of a committee to decide when inter-provincial competitions should be played.

He has worked for the media as a television analyst on The Championship on the BBC, and on TG4.

In September 2019, the Armagh County Board formally proposed Burns as GAA president.

== GAA Presidency ==
In February 2023, Burns was elected to succeed Larry McCarthy as President of the Gaelic Athletic Association. Burns' three-year presidential term began on 24 February 2024.

In a wide-ranging interview on BBC Northern Ireland's Talkback on 17 April 2024, Burns spoke to William Crawley over many issues the GAA faces.

In January 2025, after Naas GAA announced Rory Gallagher was to be appointed a coach, Burns sent an email to Naas GAA expressing concern about Gallagher's appointment, and the offer was withdrawn.

He personally attended a special meeting of the Mayo County Board in May 2025.

== Personal life ==
Burns, fluent in Irish, is married to Suzanne and they have five children. Megan, Fionnan, Jarly Óg, Conall and Ellen.Jarly Óg, has played for Armagh, as has a nephew, Paddy. In 2013, he became the principal of St Paul's High School, Bessbrook.

Sporting positions
Preceded by	Armagh Senior Football Captain; 1998–1999	Succeeded by Kieran McGeeney
Preceded by Larry McCarthy	President of the Gaelic Athletic Association; 2024–present	Succeeded by Incumbent
