= Aidan O'Rourke =

Aidan O'Rourke may refer to:

- Aidan O'Rourke (musician) (born 1975), fiddle player and member of Lau
- Aidan O'Rourke (footballer) (born 1984), Gaelic football player
