= Shane O'Neill's GAC =

Armagh-based Gaelic games club

- CLG Sheáin Uí Néill
- Founded: 1905
- County: Armagh
- Nickname: The Shanes
- Colours: Green and white
- Grounds: Páirc Sheáin Uí Néill
- Coordinates: 54°10′45.73″N 6°2′2.04″W

Playing kits
Standard colours

Senior Club Championships
	All Ireland	Ulster champions	Armagh champions
Football:	0	0	2

Shane O'Neill's Gaelic Athletic Club (Irish: CLG Sheáin Uí Néill) is a GAA club from Camlough, County Armagh. It is part of Armagh GAA and its grounds are known as Páirc Sheáin Uí Néill.

Shane O'Neill's currently plays Gaelic football in the Armagh Intermediate Championship. In addition to its senior and reserve team, it fields youth teams at Under-6, U-8, U-10, U-12, U-14, U-16, Minor and U-21. Ladies' Gaelic football is played at senior and juvenile levels. The associated camogie club is Méabh O'Neill's. In all, the club fields 14 teams at all age levels, involving over 250 players.

== History ==
Camloch (also spelt Camlough) was one of the earliest places in Armagh to organise a GAA club, the first having affiliated in 1888, and despite its small population, currently has three GAA clubs (the others being St Patrick's Carrickcruppen GFC and Craobh Rua GAA hurling club).

The 1888 club, William O'Brien's GFC, named after Land League agitator and nationalist MP William O'Brien (1852–1928), was affected by the political rifts that followed the death of Parnell in 1891, and the name William O'Brien's was dropped. Shane O'Neill's, founded in 1905 and named after the 16th-century Ulster king Seán an díomais Ó Néill, is essentially a continuation of the first club.

In 1944 the formation of the Carrickcruppen club led to a number of players leaving Shane O'Neill's. This weakened the club and eventually, hit by emigration, the club was unable to sustain its activities, and disbanded in 1967.

However a group of locals decided in 1984 to relaunch the club, and the Shanes reaffiliated in 1985.

== Gaelic football ==
Having lost the replayed 1906 Armagh Senior Football Championship final to Cross Red Hands, Shane O'Neill's won the 1907 final, defeating Bessbrook Geraldines by 2–01 to 1–03. The Shanes next appeared in an SFC final in 1910, defeating Crossmaglen by the same scoreline of 2–01 to 1–03, but lost the 1911 final to Crossmaglen.

In 1941, Shane O'Neill's won the Armagh Junior Football Championship, defeating Ballyhegan by 0–10 to 1–02. No more titles were won before the club disbanded in 1967.

After the 1985 reformation, the club's U-14 side won the All-Ireland Féile title in 1987. Many of that team had graduated to the senior team by 1994, when Shane O'Neill's won the county Junior Championship, beating Ballymacnab by 1–13 to 2–08. The club was promoted to the Intermediate championship, but had no success and returned to the Junior level in 2001. The club again won the JFC in 2009, defeating neighbouring Belleeks by 0–13 to 0–07. This took the Shanes into the Ulster Junior Club Football Championship, where they reached the semi-finals.

In 2010, the club won its first Division 3 league title, winning promotion for the first time to Division 2. The Minor team won the 2010 county championship. In 2012 the Shanes won the renamed Intermediate League (the old Division 2), so that in 2013 the club would for the first time be playing in the Senior League (former Division 1).

=== Notable players ===
- Greg McCabe

=== Honours ===
- Armagh Senior Football Championship (2)
  - 1907, 1910; runners-up 1906, 1911
- Armagh Intermediate Football Championship(1)
  - 2022
- Armagh Junior Football Championship (3)
  - 1941, 1994, 2009
- Armagh All-County Intermediate League (A) (2)
  - 2012, 2022
- Armagh All-County Intermediate League B (1)
  - 2018
- Armagh All-County League Division 3 (1)
  - 2010
- Armagh All-County League Division 4 (2)
  - 2004, 2008
- Armagh Minor Football Championship (1)
  - 2010
- Armagh All-County shield (1)
  - 2011

== Ladies' football ==
The Under-14 Girls team formed in the early 2000s won the Armagh championship in 2009. In the same year they were runners-up in the All-County League, and participated in the Kilmacud 7s and Ulster and All-Ireland Féile competitions. In 2010, the U-12 and U-14 teams won their respective county League and Championship titles, and the U-14s were runners-up in the All-Ireland Féile. The club also has U-16, U-18 and Senior Ladies teams.

== Camogie ==
Méabh O'Neill's Camogie Club was founded in 1919. Little is known of its early years, but from 1940 the club participated in the Newry and District Camogie League, reaching the final in 1943. In 1941 it reached the final of the Armagh Camogie Championship, and in 1943 the South Armagh divisional final. However, as on the football side, the formation of Carrickcruppen led to defections, and the disbandment of the Méabhs in 1945.

After camogie was successfully introduced to the local primary school, Méabh O'Neill's Camogie Club was revived in Camloch in 2001. The under-age teams had a number of early successes, and the Méabhs currently field teams at all age levels up to Senior.

== Facilities ==
In the club's centenary year, 2005, a new clubhouse and pitch were opened at Páirc Sheáin Uí Néill, on the south side of the Newry Road just outside the village, with a challenge match between Armagh and Louth. The club is currently raising funds for extensions and improvements to the playing fields and clubhouse, estimated to cost £500,000.
