= St Killian's GAC =

Armagh-based Gaelic games club

St Killian's, Whitecross
- Naomh Cillian, Crois Bán
- Founded: 1904
- County: Armagh
- Colours: Green and White
- Grounds: Páirc Naomh Cillian
- Coordinates: 54°13′09.16″N 6°29′57.85″W

Playing kits
Standard colours

Senior Club Championships
	All Ireland	Ulster champions	Armagh champions
Football:	-	-	1

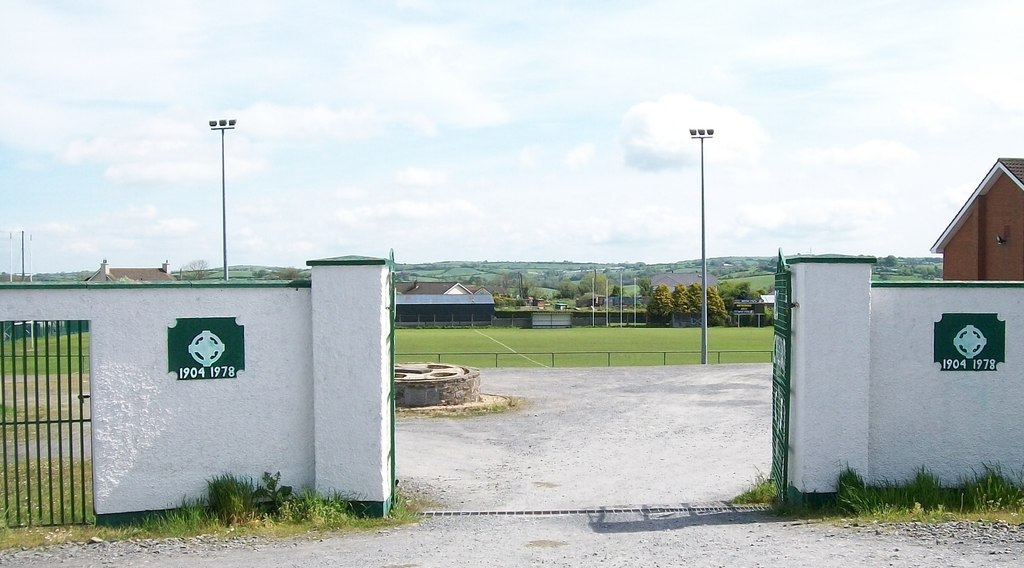
St Killian's grounds

St Killian's Gaelic Athletic Club (Irish: CLG Naomh Cillian, Crois Bán), Whitecross is a Gaelic Athletic Association club in Armagh, Northern Ireland.

== History ==
The club was formed in 1904 when local parish rivals, Ballymoyer Emmetts and Tullywinney Sarsfields, came together to form a team at Whitecross which is the centre of the parish of Loughgilly, in south Armagh. They had not long to wait for their first success on the field when in January 1906 they travelled to Abbey Park, Armagh, to take on the local Armagh Young Irelands (now known as Armagh Harps) - in the final of the county football championship. The newly formed St Killian's emerged victorious by a goal on a score line of 2-4 to 1-4. This was to be their only success in the senior championship.

They had to wait until 1935 for their next championship success when they annexed the Junior title by defeating near neighbours, Clady, in the final. Six years later in 1941, they defeated the famed Clan na Gael from Lurgan to win the Junior title for a second time. Their opponents included within their ranks two Ulster and county stars in Eddie McLoughlin and a future President of the Association, Alf Murray.

Whitecross had to wait until 1969 for their next victory in the Junior Championship when they defeated Ballymacnab by two points 0-4 to 0-2 in the final at the Athletic Grounds, Armagh. Nine years later they won the Intermediate Championship defeating Culloville Blues after a replay which took place at Carrickcruppen.

Another highlight of 1978 and indeed in the history of the club was the official opening of St Killian's' very own football pitch - Pairc Naomh Cillian - which was opened by Con Short, the then President of the Ulster Council of the GAA. Armagh played Down in the opening match and afterwards both teams, guests and friends were entertained in the Ardmore Hotel, Newry.

The Club had its new hall and changing room complex opened by GAA President Jack Boothman, on 4 November 1995, and a club history was launched at the Annual Dinner in their new premises during February 1996.

Whitecross were beaten in the 1995 Junior Football Championship Final by Ballyhegan in what became known as one of the best finals at any grade in Armagh football for several decades. They reached the final again in 1996.

The St Killian's Senior team won promotion from the 2nd Division in 2005 and successfully fought off relegation in 2006. In 2007 the team was relegated back to Division 2, but won the Intermediate Championship.

Whitecross won the 2016 Armagh Intermediate Football Championship.

== Achievements ==
- Armagh Intermediate Football Championship: (3)
  - 1978, 2007, 2016
- Armagh Junior Football Championship: (4)
  - 1935, 1941, 1969, 1995

== St Killian's ladies ==
St Killian's have fielded ladies' teams from under-14 to minor level and, from 2020, a senior ladies' team.
