= Kevin McElvanna =

Armagh Gaelic footballer

Personal information
- Born: County Armagh, Northern Ireland

Sport
- Sport: Gaelic football
- Position: Corner-back
Club
- Years: Club
- Madden Raparees GAC
Inter-county
- Years: County
- 2001-2006: Armagh
Inter-county titles
- Ulster titles: 4
- All-Irelands: 1
- NFL: 1
- All Stars: 0

Kevin McElvanna is an Irish Gaelic footballer from the small club of Madden south-west of Armagh city. He played at senior level for the Armagh county team from 2001 to 2006 as a defender.

== Football career ==
McElvanna attended Queen's University Belfast. He won a Sigerson Cup in 2000 and received a Full Blue award for his football achievements. He also captained Armagh's U21 team to an Ulster Under-21 Football Championship. McElvanna was selected for the Armagh senior panel in 2001. In his six years as a panel member, he won four Ulster Senior Football Championship medals and one All-Ireland Senior Football Championship medal. Although he wasn't always in the Armagh first team, McElvanna played an important role in games such as the 2004 Ulster semi-final.
