= Joe O'Hare =

Irish Gaelic footballer (1929–2015)

Patrick Joseph O'Hare (1929 – 21 September 2015) was an Irish Gaelic footballer who played for the Ballymacnab Round Towers club and at senior level for the Armagh county team. He was the only Ballymacnab man to have played in an All-Ireland Senior Football Championship final, after coming on for captain Sean Quinn in the second half of the 1953 final, until Rory Grugan emulated him in the 2024 final for Armagh against Galway.
