= Armagh Intermediate Football Championship =

Annual Gaelic football competition

- Irish: Craobh Idirmheánach Peile Ard Mhacha
- Founded: 1964
- Title holders: St Peters, Lurgan (4th title)
- Most titles: Madden / Whitecross (4 titles)

The Armagh Intermediate Football Championship is an annual Gaelic football competition contested by mid-tier Armagh GAA clubs. The national media covers the competition.

== History ==
The 2014 Armagh IFC winning club was St Paul's, which defeated the Grange by a scoreline of 2-13 to 2-10. Andrew Murnin gave a match-winning performance in the final.

The competition is often contested by senior inter-county players, for example, Clan na Gael's Stefan Campbell (who was captain of Armagh at the time) contested the 2020 final, a game in which he went up against another of Armagh's leading full-forwards, Andrew Murnin of St Paul's.

== Honours ==
The trophy presented to the winners is the Atty Hearty Cup The Armagh IFC winner qualifies for the Ulster Intermediate Club Football Championship. It is the only team from County Armagh to qualify for this competition. The Armagh IFC winner may enter the Ulster Intermediate Club Football Championship at either the preliminary round or the quarter-final stage.

The Armagh IFC winners — by winning the Ulster Intermediate Club Football Championship — may qualify for the All-Ireland Intermediate Club Football Championship, at which it would enter at the semi-final stage, providing it hasn't been drawn to face the British champions in the quarter-finals.

== List of finals ==
Year	Winner	Score	Opponent	Score
1964	Madden		Ballyhegan	
1965†	Clan na Gael, Lurgan		Dorsey†	
1966	Tír na nÓg		Killeavy	
1967	Pearse Óg		Silverbridge	
1968	St Peter's, Lurgan		Mullaghbawn	
1969	Sarsfields		Ballyhegan	
1970	Madden		Mullaghbawn	
1971	Whitecross		St Patrick's	
1972	Silverbridge		Oliver Plunkett's	
1973	Pearse Óg		Whitecross	
1974	Armagh Harps		Oliver Plunkett's	
1975	Ballyhegan		Oliver Plunkett's	
1976	Middletown		Clann Éireann	
1977	Clann Éireann		Culloville	
1978	Whitecross		Culloville	
1979	St Patrick's		Mullaghbawn	
1980	Tír na nÓg		Granemore	
1981	St Peter's, Lurgan		Keady	
1982	Culloville		Ballyhegan	
1983	Keady		Killeavy	
1984	St Paul's, Lurgan		Grange	
1985	Derrynoose		Dromintee	
1986	Killeavy		Grange	
1987	Grange		Middletown	
1988	St Patrick's		Mullaghbawn	
1989	Dromintee		Mullaghbawn	
1990	Collegeland		Annaghmore	
1991	Granemore		St Michael's	
1992	Mullaghbawn		Middletown	
1993	Grange		Keady	
1994	Madden		Middletown	
1995	Keady		Culloville	
1996	Dromintee		Middletown	
1997	Ballyhegan		Collegeland	
1998	Culloville		Tír na nÓg	
1999	St Michael's		Belleeks	
2000	Éire Óg		Collegeland	
2001	Tír na nÓg		An Port Mór	
2002	Clann Éireann		Carrickcruppen	
2003	Maghery		Madden	
2004	Carrickcruppen		Ballyhegan	
2005	Granemore		Whitecross	
2006	Ballymacnab	0-11	Madden	0-07
2007	Whitecross		Culloville	
2008	St Patrick's		Culloville	
2009	St Michael's		Keady	
2010	Sarsfields		Culloville	
2011	Culloville		Tír na nÓg	
2012	Killeavy	0-13	St Peter's	0-08
2013	Madden	0-15	Tír na nÓg	2-06
2014	St Paul's Lurgan	2-13	Grange	2-10
2015	Clann Éireann	2-13	Whitecross	2-08
2016	Whitecross	2-14	Tullysaran	1-14
2017	Killeavy	1-13	Silverbridge	0-11
2018	St Peter's Lurgan	1-11	Mullaghbawn	1-10
2019	Grange		Shane O'Neill's	
2020	Clan na Gael		St Paul's	
2021	Carrickcruppen, St Patrick's	1-12	Culloville	0-12
2022	Shane O’Neills	2.11	St pauls	1.13
2023	St. Patrick’s Cullyhanna	4-21	St. Paul’s Lurgan	1-08
2024	Carrickcruppen	2-09	St. Paul’s Lurgan	1-11
2025	Sarsfields	2-15	St. Paul's Lurgan	1-15
2026	St Peters,Lurgan	1-9	Keady	1-8

Notes

† The 1965 runner-up may have been Tom Williams GFC, an amalgamation of Dorsey and Cullyhanna.
