= Aidan O'Rourke (footballer) =

Armagh Gaelic footballer; coach and manager

Personal information
- Born: 1971 (age 54–55) County Armagh
- Height: 5 ft 10 in (178 cm)

Sport
- Sport: Gaelic football
- Position: Half-Back
Club
- Years: Club
- ?–?: Dromintee
Inter-county
- Years: County
- 2001–2009: Armagh
Inter-county titles
- Ulster titles: 5
- All-Irelands: 1
- NFL: 1
- All Stars: 1

Aidan O'Rourke (born 1984) is a manager and former Gaelic footballer. He played from 2001 to 2009, winning an All Star and an All-Ireland Senior Football Championship as a player for the Armagh county team in 2002.

== Playing career ==
Born in County Armagh, O'Rourke played football with his local club Dromintee St Patrick's GAC. A member of the Armagh senior football team between 2001 and 2006, and again in 2008 and 2009, he won one All-Ireland Senior Football Championship in 2002, the same year as he won his only All Star award. He was also on the team that won the National Football League in 2005.

== Management career ==
On 8 October 2012, O'Rourke was named Louth manager for a two-year term, after previous involvement with Kildare and Down as a selector. O'Rourke left the role in mid-2014.

In January 2015, he was appointed manager of the Armagh minor Gaelic football team.

After Kevin McStay stood aside as Roscommon senior manager in 2018, O'Rourke was the preferred replacement; however, he withdrew and Anthony Cunningham was appointed instead.

In October 2022, O'Rourke was appointed as head coach of the Donegal senior footballers, under the management of Paddy Carr.

O'Rourke was named as Lead Coach, part of Kildare's backroom staff under new manager Brian Flanagan.

== Honours ==
Team

- 1 All-Ireland Senior Football Championship (2002)
- 7 Ulster Senior Football Championships (1999, 2000, 2002, 2004, 2005, 2006, 2008)
- 1 National Football League Division 1 (2005)
- 2 Ulster Minor League & Championships (1992, 1994)

Individual

- 1 Irish News Ulster All Stars Award (2003)
- 1 All Stars Award (2002)

Sporting positions
Preceded by Peter Fitzpatrick	Louth Senior Football Manager; 2012–2014	Succeeded by Colin Kelly
