= High Moss Sarsfields GFC =

Armagh-based Gaelic games club

- CLG Sáirséiligh na Móinte Arda
- Founded: 1926
- County: Armagh
- Nickname: The Hoops
- Colours: Green and white
- Coordinates: 54°30′11.13″N 6°27′32.84″W

Playing kits
Standard colours

Senior Club Championships
	All Ireland	Ulster champions	Armagh champions
Football:	-	-	1

High Moss Sarsfields Gaelic Football Club (Irish: CLG Sáirséiligh na Móinte Arda) is a Gaelic Athletic Association club based in Derrytrasna, County Armagh, Northern Ireland. In addition to having numerous Gaelic football teams it is also a centre for Ladies' Gaelic football and other sports and activities. Sarsfields currently play in the Armagh Senior Football Championship and other Armagh GAA competitions.

== History ==
The club was founded in 1926 and its highest achievement to date came in 1990, when it won the county Senior Football Championship, defeating Armagh Harps 0-09 to 0-06. It reached the final again in 1992, losing to Pearse Óg.

In 2007 the Men's Senior team was promoted to Division 2; the Ladies' team also won promotion. This returned the Senior team to Division One of the All-County League. In 2010, in their second season back in Division One, the Sarsfields lifted the Armagh Intermediate Football Championship title. Following a successful run in the IFC against Shane O'Neill's, Keady and Silverbridge, the Hoops defeated South Armagh side Culloville Blues at Crossmaglen on 3 October; Sarsfields 1-15, Culloville 0-11. Thomas McAlinden struck a goal within the opening 13 seconds of the game, possibly the quickest goal in any Armagh Championship Final. The Atty Hearty cup was lifted by captain Mark Reynolds.

=== Honours ===
- Armagh Senior Football Championship: (1)
  - 1990; Runners-up 1992
- Armagh Intermediate Football Championship: (3)
  - 1969, 2010, 2025
- Armagh Junior Football Championship: (1)
  - 1949
