= Dromintee St Patrick's GAC =

Armagh-based Gaelic games club

- CLG Naomh Pádraig, Dromainn Tí
- Founded: 1887
- County: Armagh
- Colours: White and blue
- Grounds: Páirc Uí Luachra agus Mhic Cathmhaoil

Playing kits
Standard colours

Dromintee St Patrick's Gaelic Athletic Club (Irish: CLG Naomh Pádraig, Dromainn Tí) is a GAA club in Armagh. It represents the Dromintee and Jonesborough parish on the southern border of County Armagh. Dromintee plays Gaelic football and, as of 2020, was playing in the Armagh Senior Football Championship.

== History ==
Dromintee Gaelic Football Club was established in 1886 or 1887, becoming the first Armagh club to affiliate to the Gaelic Athletic Association (GAA). The Dundalk Democrat reported a match played on 27 February 1887 between Dromintee and Kilcurry (County Louth). The Dromintee team, which may have been known as "Gap of the North", seems to have disappeared within a year.

In the 1920s, Gaelic games underwent a revival, with the formation in the parish of Jonesboro Border Rangers GAC. The high point of this club's existence was winning the Armagh Junior Football Championship in 1934, defeating High Moss by 1-7 to 2-2. This club broke up in 1937, but were again active in 1941–1946. (In the interim, a club called Faughil Emmets operated in the parish in 1940–41.)

The present club, Dromintee St Patrick's, was founded in 1952, when it won the South Armagh League. Dromintee won the South Armagh Junior Championship in 1954 and the Armagh Junior League in 1963.

Dromintee's first victory in a county championship final was in 1966, when it secured the Junior title. While the club had limited successes in the 1970s, its fortunes revived with league victories in 1983 (Division 4) and 1984 (Div. 3). It won the JFC again in 1984, and was promoted to the Intermediate ranks.

In 1985, Dromintee lost the Armagh Intermediate Football Championship final to Derrynoose. The club opened its new grounds, Páirc Uí Luachra agus Mhic Cathmhaoil (Lochrie and Campbell Park), in 1988. In 1989, it secured its first IFC title, defeating Mullaghbawn 0-10 to 0-7. Another IFC title came in 1996, when Dromintee beat Middletown Eoghan Rua by 1-9 to 0-6.

The club did not reach a Senior county final until 2001, when it lost to Crossmaglen Rangers. It faced Crossmaglen again in the 2002, 2003, 2005 and 2010 finals, losing on each occasion.

Dromintee was the home of a former GAA President, Pádraig MacNamee. He served as president from 1938 to 1943 as a representative of Antrim.

== Hurling and camogie ==
Hurling and camogie teams were formed in 1987, but the former was short-lived. The camogie team has won two county championships and several league titles.

== Notable players and former players ==
- Aidan O'Rourke, Armagh county player 2001–09, All Star, former Louth manager
- Kevin Dyas, Armagh county player and Australian rules footballer

== Honours ==
- Armagh Junior Football Championship (2): 1966, 1984
- Armagh Intermediate Football Championship (2): 1989, 1996
- Armagh Under-21 Football Championship (1): 2003
- Armagh Junior Camogie Championship (1): 1994
- Armagh Intermediate Camogie Championship (1): 1996
- Armagh Senior Football League A (1): 2020/2021
- Armagh Minor Football Championship (1):2025
- Ulster Minor Football Championship (1):2025
