= Steven McDonnell (Gaelic footballer) =

Armagh Gaelic footballer

Personal information
- Born: 13 July 1979 (age 47) Newry, County Armagh, Northern Ireland
- Height: 6 ft 0 in (183 cm)

Sport
- Sport: Gaelic football
- Position: Forward
Club
- Years: Club
- ? -Present: Killeavy St Moninna's GAC
Club titles
- Armagh titles: 1 Intermediate
- Ulster titles: 0
Inter-county**
Years	County	Apps (scores)
1999-2012	Armagh	161 53-504 (663)
Inter-county titles
- Ulster titles: 7
- All-Irelands: 1
- NFL: 1 Division 1 2005 & 1 Division 2 2010
- All Stars: 3 Irish News Allstars = 6; 3 International Rules 1 Armagh Intermediate championship 2012
- **Inter County team apps and scores correct as of 15:11, 17 May 2008 (UTC).

Steven McDonnell (born 13 July 1979) is an Irish former Gaelic footballer who played in the full-forward line for his home club Killeavy St Moninna's and at senior level for the Armagh county team.

McDonnell is his county's top scorer in National Football League history, finishing his career with 33–282 (381) in that competition.

== Playing career ==
Raised in Killeavy, near Newry, Northern Ireland, the highlight of his career was his county's All-Ireland SFC winning victory over Kerry by a scoreline of 1–12 to 0–14 in the 2002 All-Ireland Senior Football Championship Final at Croke Park, where he kicked the winning point. He also received the first of his three All-Stars for his performances that year. In 2003 he was named GPA Footballer of the Year, and the Ulster GAA Writers' Player of the Year.

In 2006 he secured an Ulster Senior Football Championship winning medal for his part in Armagh's easily won victory over rivals Donegal. In 2010 he captained Armagh to a National Football League Division 2 title after beating Down in the final in Croke Park.

In 2010 he was also named captain of the Ireland International rules team. In 2011 he became the first ever player in the history of the International rules to score over 100 points. He finished his International career with a tally of 118 points.

On 12 April 2012, McDonnell announced his retirement.

He has been involved in both coaching and management.
