= Silverbridge Harps GFC =

Armagh-based Gaelic games club

- Cláirsigh Bhéal Atha an Airgid
- Founded: 1887
- County: Armagh
- Colours: Gold with blue hoop
- Grounds: Keeley Park (Páirc Uí Chaollaí)

Playing kits
Standard colours

Silverbridge Harps Gaelic Football Club (Irish: Cláirsigh Bhéal Atha an Airgid) is a Gaelic football club in southern County Armagh, Northern Ireland. It is based in the parish of Upper Creggan, including the village of Silverbridge and surrounding townlands. Silverbridge plays at Keeley Park (Irish: Páirc Uí Chaolla), as part of the Armagh GAA and is currently in the Armagh Senior Football Championship.

== History ==
The first GAA club in the parish, the Carnally William Orr's, was established in 1887, as one of the earliest in Armagh. This club dissolved after the 1888 Annual Congress and the Parnell split. A revived team, Silverbridge, played for one season in 1906, but although football continued in the locality, it was not until about 1920 that the club reformed. This club reached the semi-final of the Armagh Senior Football Championship in 1924.

A new Silverbridge Harps club was organised in September 1935, and in 1937 reached the county Junior Championship Final. The club then disappeared but was again reformed in 1942. In 1945, a Silverbridge selection including players from two other Junior clubs, Whitecross and Mullaghbawn, reached the Senior Championship Final only to lose to St Malachy's of Armagh city.

In 1953 Silverbridge lost the Junior Championship Final to Mullaghbawn, but the Harps' first county title came in 1959, when they won the Armagh Junior Football Championship, defeating Ballyhegan.

In 1972 Silverbridge won the Armagh Intermediate Football Championship, defeating Oliver Plunkett's by 3-04 to 1-06. In the same year the club won Division 2 of the All County League, and did so again in 1984, 1989 and 1991. Promoted to Division One, Silverbridge won that title in 1992 and 1994, but was relegated to Division Two in 2002.

== Notable players ==
- Jarlath Burns, captained Armagh to 1999 Ulster Senior Football Championship title
- Jarly Óg Burns, son of Jarlath
- Jemmy McCreesh, scored the winning goal for Armagh in the 1926 Ulster Senior final

== Honours ==
- Armagh Senior Football Championship
  - runners-up 1945
- Armagh Intermediate Football Championship (1)
  - 1972; runners-up 1967
- Armagh Junior Football Championship (1)
  - 1959; runners-up 1937, 1953
- Armagh All-County League Division One (2)
  - 1992, 1994
- Armagh All-County League Division Two (4)
  - 1972, 1984, 1989, 1991, won 2017
- ’’’Armagh minor football Championship Division 1
    - 2019
