= Wolfe Tone GAA (Armagh) =

Armagh-based Gaelic games club

Wolfe Tone GAC
- De Bhulbh Ton CLG
- Founded: 1917
- County: Armagh
- Nickname: Tones or The Cash
- Colours: Green and white
- Grounds: Raparee Park (Páirc na Ropairí)

Playing kits
Standard colours

Wolfe Tone Gaelic Athletic Club (Irish: De Bhulbh Ton CLG) is a Gaelic Athletic Association (GAA) club in County Armagh, Northern Ireland. It is based in the townland of Derrymacash, on the southern shore of Lough Neagh, close to Lurgan. It is part of Armagh GAA and plays at Raparee Park (Irish: Páirc na Ropairí. The club takes its name from the republican leader of the 1798 revolution, Wolfe Tone.

The club plays Gaelic football in the Armagh Senior Championship, and fields teams at all age levels from Under-8 to Senior. The associated camogie club is St Enda's. Wolfe Tone and St Enda's GAC is located in Derrymacash in north Armagh.

== History ==
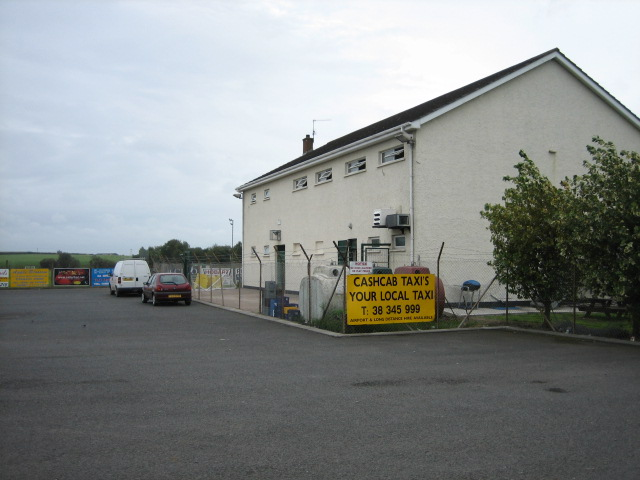
Páirc na Ropairí clubhouse

The club was founded in 1917. Gaelic football has been played in Doire Mhic Cais from the very inception of the GAA and the Wolfe Tone club came into existence in 1911. The early teams competed in the South West Antrim League up until 1920, when the fight for independence had a negative impact on the Association across the country. The club was revived in 1924, when J.J. Murray, along with Charles McConville, John McCorry and Paddy McCann, entered the club into numerous local competitions and Murray formed the Lurgan League for teams from the north Armagh area. The Tones club was based at a practice field on Aghacommon Lane and competed in various leagues including the mid-Armagh League, the Lurgan and District League and the Armagh All-County League.

In 1930, the Tones affiliated with the Armagh County Board and later that year, they defeated Armagh Tír na nÓg, to bring the Armagh Junior Championship to north Armagh for the first time. In 1938 the Tones won the North Armagh League and the Mac Oscar Cup followed in 1939. In 1943, a Wolfe Tones selection became the first team to bring the Armagh Senior Championship to north Armagh. In 1954, the Tones won the Armagh Senior League. In 1964, an amalgamated Tones and Sarsfields team won the Armagh Minor Championship under the name St Patrick's, which was a forerunner for the current Under 14 Doire Emmets team. The Tones senior football team competed in that year's County Senior Final but lost out to Mullaghbane and in 1966, the Tones finished runners-up in the All-County League to Crossmaglen. In 1967, the Tones once again reached the County Senior Final, but lost again, but that year saw the club go undefeated through the All-County League. The Tones claimed the Armagh Junior Championship back in 2000 and any success on the football field has come from the club's underage teams since then. The country received some fame, due to the club's more illustrious footballers with two Wolfe Tones greats, the late John McCarron and the late Bill McCorry providing the backbone for the county team who claimed the All-Ireland Junior Football Final in 1948. Bill went on to become the first Tones man to play for Armagh in an All-Ireland senior final in 1953, accompanied by panel member Seán Quinn, but it was the men from the Kingdom who got the upper hand that day. The late Noel Greene was the first Tones man to line out for the county minors in an All-Ireland final, back in 1957. It took a Tones man to bring the first All-Star award to the Orchard County, with Paddy Moriarty winning his first in 1972 and claiming a second in 1977 for his exploits in Armagh's run to the All-Ireland final.

A number of players also have the distinction of representing Ulster in the Railway Cup with Bill McCorry and Seán Quinn being members of a victorious Ulster side, while Leo McAlinden won a Railway Cup medal for Connacht. Eddie McLaughlin and Alf Murray were also playing for the Tones when selected on Ulster teams and Paddy Moriarty represented the province, as well as a Combined Universities side and the All-Stars’ teams which travelled to America.

== Rivalries ==
As with most clubs in around the Lurgan area there are quite a lot of rivalries. The two county clubs rival each other, Wolfe Tone GAC and Sarsfields GAA..

== Gaelic football ==
Apart from the victory of a Tones-led selection in the 1943 Armagh Senior Football Championship final, defeating Crossmaglen, the club's highest point in sporting terms came in 1964, when the Tones lost by three points to Mullaghbawn in the SFC final. They had two other SFC final appearances, losing in 1967 to Crossmaglen by 9 points, and in 1973 to Clann na nGael by 15 points. The Tones have also won two JFC championships, in 1930 and 2000. In 2026, the Tones senior team won the Armagh Intermediate Football League Division 2B.

=== Notable players ===
- Bill McCorry, Armagh player, played in the 1953 All-Ireland final
- Paddy Moriarty, Armagh's first All Star, played in Armagh's second All-Ireland Final in 1977
- Jamie “The Prodigy” Halfpenny Scored an Impressive 11-33 In His First U16 Season And Played Up at Minor. His Career Was Cut Short At The End Of His Last Minor Season Due To Complications With Managers.

=== Honours ===
- Armagh Senior Football Championship (0):
  - Runners-up 1964, 1967, 1973
- North Armagh League (1):
  - 1938
- Mac Oscar Cup (1):
  - 1939
- Armagh Junior Football Championship (2):
  - 1930, 2000
- Armagh Football Minor Championship (1):
  - 2020
- Armagh Intermediate Football League Division 2B (1):
  - 2026
