= Madden Raparees GAC =

Armagh-based Gaelic games club

- Ropairí na Madán
- Founded: 1933
- County: Armagh
- Colours: Red and Black
- Grounds: Páirc na Ropairí
- Coordinates: 54°19′02″N 6°42′49″W

Playing kits
Standard colours

Senior Club Championships
	All Ireland	Ulster champions	Armagh champions
Football:	-	-	1

Madden Raparees Gaelic Athletic Club (Irish: Ropairí na Madan) is a Gaelic Athletic Association club located southwest of Milford, County Armagh, Northern Ireland. The club is part of Armagh GAA and plays Gaelic football in the Armagh Senior Championship. They play at Raparee Park (Irish: Páirc na Ropairí), located just 2.6 miles to the northeast of Madden.

The club takes its name from the raparees (pikemen), a term applied to guerrilla fighters on the Jacobite side during the 1690s Williamite war in Ireland, and subsequently to bandits and highwaymen.

== History ==
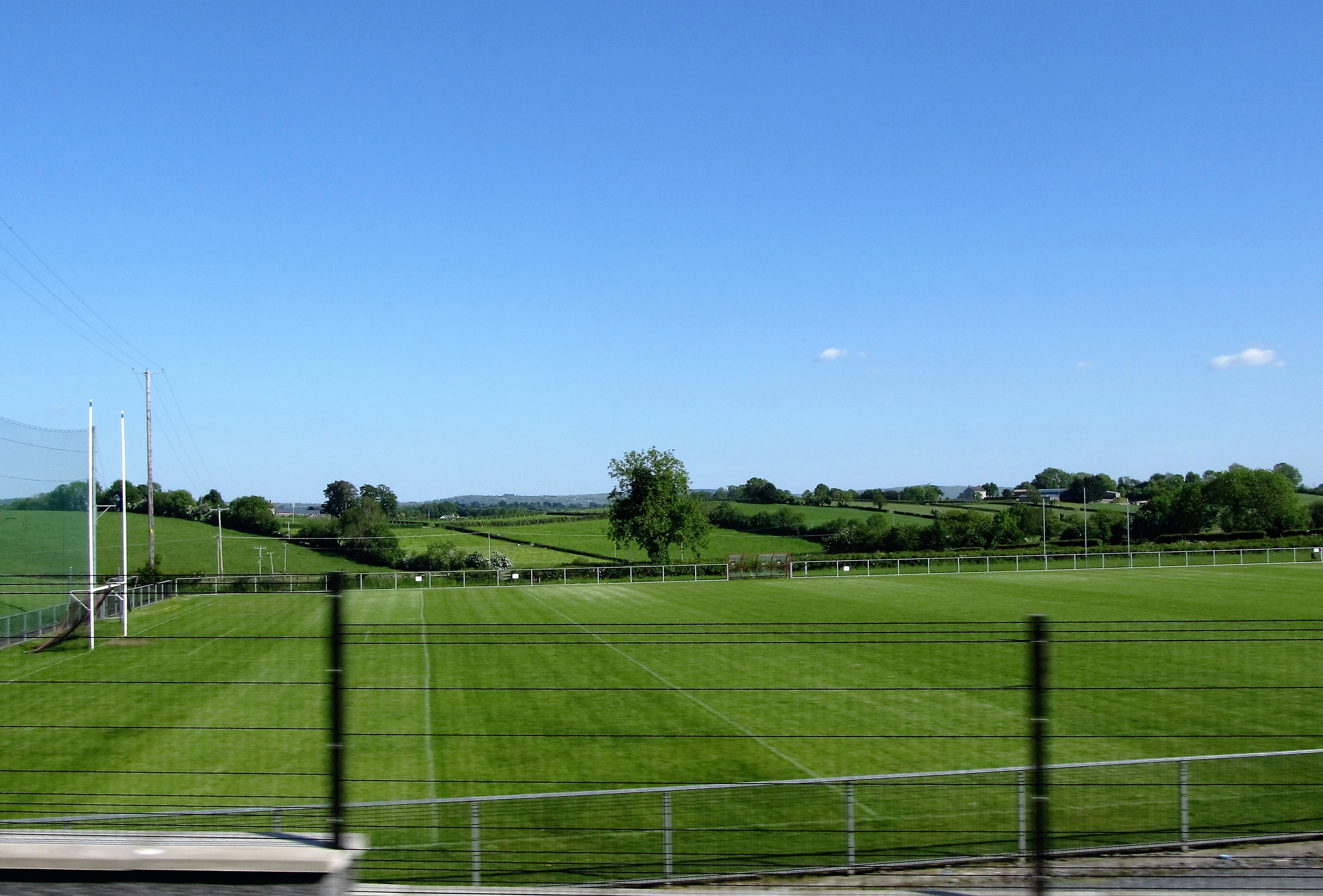
Páirc na Ropairí, in the townland of Maghery Kilcrany

Founded in 1931, but not officially affiliated until 1934, Madden initially adopted green-and-black colours and played at a pitch near Brootally crossroads. The club ceased to operate during the Second World War, but returned in 1946, adopting green jerseys with gold hoops and moving to a new field at Lisglyn.

Maddens first official recorded game was played against Keady in 1934 beating Keady by a score of 1-8 to 0-7, with inside forward Joe Feeney scoring four points.

The club's first county title came in 1953 when the Raparees won the Junior Championship, defeating St Peter's of Lurgan by 4-5 to 1-1. These were the years of the club's greatest player, Jimmy Whan, one of the winners of the inaugural Cú Chulainn Awards, precursors of the All Stars. After a time in the Senior ranks, in 1964 Madden won the inaugural Intermediate Championship final, defeating Blackwatertown 1-8 to 0-8. In the following year, in which its Senior team briefly featured in Division 1 of the All-County League, Madden reached the county Minor final, losing the replay. Madden won Division 2 of the ACL in 1969. The present red and black strip in the 1960s.

The Intermediate title came back to Madden in 1970 (beat Mullaghbawn 0-6 to 0-5) in 1994 (beat Middletown 2-4 to 0-8) and in 2013 (beat Tir Na Nog 0-15 to 2-6). The club lost the Junior final to Collegeland in 1988, lost again in 1990 to Granemore but won the title in 1993. The club lost the Intermediate finals of 2003 and 2006.

The high point of Madden's history to date came in 1998 when it featured in the Senior Championship final, having the misfortune to meet Crossmaglen Rangers in the third year of that club's 13-year run of Senior titles.Another high point was Madden’s victory over Tir Na Óg in the intermediate final in 2013.

The club's secretary Patrick Grimley, a brother of Niall Grimley, was killed in a traffic collision in November 2023.

== Honours ==
- Armagh Senior Football Championship: (1)
  - 2025
- Armagh Intermediate Football Championship: (4)
  - 1964, 1970, 1994, 2013
- Armagh Feile 2026
- Armagh Junior Football Championship: (2)
  - 1953, 1993

== Notable players ==
- Kevin McElvanna, Armagh defender 2001-06 All Ireland winner in 2002 and Anglo Celt winner on four occasions
- Niall Grimley, All Ireland winning midfielder 2024
- Rioghan Grimley, living legend and won the Armagh Feile in 2026
- Micky Rover played a key role in winning the 2013 Intermediate Championship Final scoring 0-4

== Camogie ==
Madden also fields camogie teams, which play as St Joseph's, Madden. In 2011 the Madden camógs reached the Division 4 final of the Féile na nGael.
