= Armagh Senior Football Championship =

Annual Gaelic football competition

- Founded: 1889
- Trophy: Gerry Fagan Cup
- Title holders: Crossmaglen Rangers (48th title)
- Most titles: Crossmaglen Rangers (48 titles)

The Armagh Senior Football Championship is an annual Gaelic football competition contested by top-tier Armagh GAA clubs. The Armagh County Board of the Gaelic Athletic Association has organised it since 1889.

Crossmaglen Rangers are the current title holders defeating Killeavy in the 2026 final.

== History ==
The first official football champions of Armagh, following the creation in 1889 of the County Board, were Armagh Harps, in the 1889 final which saw the defeat of Blackwatertown in Armagh by a scoreline of 4-14 to 0-03. Crossmaglen Rangers have won the Armagh senior football championship on most occasions, with 48 victories since 1906, including a run of 13 wins from 1996 to 2008. During the 1997-2000 victorious seasons, Crossmaglen went on to claim three All-Ireland Club Championships in four years. They have since added All-Ireland titles in 2007, 2011 and 2012.

== Honours ==
The trophy presented to the winners is the Gerry Fagan Cup. The winners of the Armagh Championship qualify to represent their county in the Ulster Senior Club Football Championship. The winners can, in turn, go on to play in the All-Ireland Senior Club Football Championship.

== List of finals ==
(r) = replay

Year	Winner	Score	Opponent	Score
1887 (unofficial - pre-County Board)	Crossmaglen Red Hands	w/o	Keady Dwyer's	scr
1888 (unofficial - pre-County Board)	No competition			
1889	Armagh Harps	4-14	Blackwatertown Shamrocks	0-03
1890	Armagh Harps			
1891	Armagh Harps			
1892–1900	No competition			
1901	Armagh Harps			
1902	Armagh Harps			
1903	Armagh Harps			
1904	Armagh Tir-na-nÓg	w/o	Culloville William O'Brien's	scr
1905	Whitecross	2-04	Armagh Harps	1-04
1906	Crossmaglen Red Hands	1-04, 1-07 (r)	Shane O'Neill's	0-06, 0-04 (r)
1907	Shane O'Neill's	2-01	Bessbrook Geraldines	1-03
1908	Creggan Rovers	1-03	Armagh Harps	1-02
1909	Bessbrook Geraldines		Armagh Harps	
1910	Shane O'Neill's	2-01	Crossmaglen Rangers	1-03
1911	Crossmaglen Rangers		Shane O'Neill's	
1912	Crossmaglen Rangers		Armagh Harps	
1913	Crossmaglen Rangers	2-02	Culloville Sons of O'Connell	0-01
1914	Killeavy	3-02	Crossmaglen Rangers	1-01
1915	Killeavy	0-04	Bessbrook Geraldines	0-02
1916	Bessbrook Geraldines		Culloville Blues	
1917	Armagh Young Irelands	1-12	Mullaghbawn	0-05
1918	Armagh Young Irelands	1-06	Crossmaglen Plunketts	0-05
1919–1922	No competition			
1923	Crossmaglen Rangers	0-09	Crossmaglen Geraldines	0-02
1924	Crossmaglen Rangers	1-01	Killeavy	0-03
1925	Crossmaglen Rangers	1-04	Armagh Young Irelands	0-04
1926	Crossmaglen Rangers		Armagh Young Irelands	
1927	Crossmaglen Rangers	1-08	Armagh Young Irelands	1-03
1928	Armagh Young Irelands		Forkhill Red Hugh O'Donnell's	
1929	No competition			
1930	Armagh Young Irelands		Crossmaglen Rangers	
1931	Armagh Young Irelands	3-06	Culloville Blues	0-03
1932	Armagh Young Irelands	3-02	Crossmaglen Rangers	0-05
1933	Crossmaglen Rangers	1-01	Armagh Young Irelands	0-02
1934	Armagh Young Irelands	2-05	Keady Dwyer's	0-04
1935	Armagh Tír-na-nÓg 0-04	(won on objection)	Crossmaglen Rangers	1-02
1936	Crossmaglen Rangers	1-08	Armagh Young Irelands	1-02
1937	Crossmaglen Rangers	0-08	Keady Dwyer's	1-00
1938	Keady Dwyer's	w/o	Armagh Tir-na-nÓg	scr
1939	Bessbrook Geraldines	2-05	Armagh Young Irelands	1-04
1940	St Michael's	1-06	Crossmaglen Rangers	0-03
1941	St Michael's		Crossmaglen Rangers	
1942	Armagh St Malachy's		Mullaghbawn	
1943	Wolfe Tone (selection)		Crossmaglen Rangers	
1944	St Peter's (selection)	2-08	Crossmaglen Rangers	1-03
1945	Armagh St Malachy's	0-07	Silverbridge (selection)	0-05
1946	Armagh Harps	0-07	Crossmaglen Rangers	0-02
1947	Crossmaglen Rangers	3-06	Armagh Harps	4-02
1948	Killeavy	2-04	Lurgan St Peter's	0-03
1949	Clan na Gael	0-06	Crossmaglen Rangers	0-02
1950	Clan na Gael	1-03	Lurgan St Peter's	0-03
1951	Lurgan St Peter's	2-07	Killeavy	1-09
1952	Armagh Harps	1-03	Clan na Gael	0-03
1953	Keady Dwyer's	0-10	Armagh Harps	2-03
1954	Clann Éireann	2-04	Clan na Gael	0-01
1955	Armagh Harps	3-09	Killeavy	1-02
1956	Keady Dwyer's	2-07	Armagh Harps	0-11
1957	Armagh Harps	2-02	Keady Dwyer's	0-05
1958	Armagh Harps	1-02	Keady Dwyer's	0-04
1959	Carrickcruppen	2-07	Clann Éireann	0-05
1960	Crossmaglen Rangers	1-11, 4-08 (r)	Clann Éireann	3-05, 3-03 (r)
1961	Collegeland O'Rahilly's	4-11	Clann Éireann	4-07
1962	Crossmaglen Rangers	2-03	Clann Éireann	0-04
1963	Clann Éireann	3-06	Crossmaglen Rangers	1-04
1964	Mullaghbawn	0-10	Wolfe Tone	1-04
1965	Crossmaglen Rangers	2-05	Clann Éireann	1-03
1966	Crossmaglen Rangers	4-11	Carrickcruppen	0-05
1967	Crossmaglen Rangers	0-12	Wolfe Tone	0-03
1968	Clan na Gael	2-06	Clann Éireann	0-04
1969	Clan na Gael	2-06	Crossmaglen Rangers	0-04
1970	Crossmaglen Rangers	1-06	Clan na Gael	0-06
1971	Clan na Gael	w/o	Carrickcruppen	scr
1972	Clan na Gael	0-08	Crossmaglen Rangers	0-07
1973	Clan na Gael	3-14	Wolfe Tone	0-08
1974	Clan na Gael	3-13	Carrickcruppen	0-07
1975	Crossmaglen Rangers	1-06, 0-09 (r)	Armagh Harps	0-09, 0-04 (r)
1976	Clan na Gael	1-08	Maghery Sean MacDermott's	0-07
1977	Crossmaglen Rangers	1-11, 1-07 (r)	Clan na Gael	3-05, 0-05 (r)
1978	Carrickcruppen	0-11	Clan na Gael	1-07
1979	Carrickcruppen	2-13	Crossmaglen Rangers	1-08
1980	Clan na Gael	3-07	Carrickcruppen	1-08
1981	Clan na Gael	0-10	Carrickcruppen	0-07
1982	Carrickcruppen	0-06	Crossmaglen Rangers	0-04
1983	Crossmaglen Rangers	2-09	Maghery Sean MacDermott's	1-06
1984	Keady Dwyer's	0-07	Armagh Harps	0-02
1985	Pearse Óg GAC	0-07	Armagh Harps	0-03
1986	Crossmaglen Rangers	3-08	Pearse Óg GAC	0-11
1987	Clan na Gael	2-06	Armagh Harps	0-06
1988	Pearse Óg GAC	1-10	Killeavy	0-05
1989	Armagh Harps	3-09	St Paul's, Lurgan	2-08
1990	Sarsfields	0-09	Armagh Harps	0-06
1991	Armagh Harps	0-11	Maghery Sean MacDermott's	1-07
1992	Pearse Óg GAC	0-13	Sarsfields	0-03
1993	Clan na Gael	2-15	Maghery Sean MacDermott's	1-06
1994	Clan na Gael	2-05	Mullaghbawn	0-06
1995	Mullaghbawn	0-10	Armagh Harps	1-05
1996	Crossmaglen Rangers	3-12	Clan na Gael	1-04
1997	Crossmaglen Rangers	0-07	Mullaghbawn	0-06
1998	Crossmaglen Rangers	2-16	Madden	0-09
1999	Crossmaglen Rangers	1-11	Pearse Óg GAC	0-06
2000	Crossmaglen Rangers	0-14	Pearse Óg GAC	1-06
2001	Crossmaglen Rangers	2-08	Dromintee	1-07
2002	Crossmaglen Rangers	2-10	Dromintee	1-08
2003	Crossmaglen Rangers	0-13	Dromintee	0-11
2004	Crossmaglen Rangers	1-09	Mullaghbawn	0-06
2005	Crossmaglen Rangers	0-12	Dromintee	0-09
2006	Crossmaglen Rangers	1-14	Clan na Gael	0-08
2007	Crossmaglen Rangers	0-12	Pearse Óg GAC	0-06
2008	Crossmaglen Rangers	0-13	Pearse Óg GAC	0-08
2009	Pearse Óg GAC	0-08	Armagh Harps	0-04
2010	Crossmaglen Rangers	1-11	Dromintee	1-08
2011	Crossmaglen Rangers	2-22	Ballymacnab	0-03
2012	Crossmaglen Rangers	3-09	Pearse Óg GAC	0-11
2013	Crossmaglen Rangers	0-17	St. Patrick's, Cullyhanna	0-08
2014	Crossmaglen Rangers	4-14	Armagh Harps	0-09
2015	Crossmaglen Rangers	2-22	Armagh Harps	0-10
2016	Maghery	1-13	St. Patrick's, Cullyhanna	0-13
2017	Armagh Harps	2-09	Maghery	0-11
2018	Crossmaglen Rangers	0-24	Ballymacnab	1-15
2019	Crossmaglen Rangers	2-18	Ballymacnab	2-09
2020	Maghery	4-09	Crossmaglen Rangers	0-17
2021	Clann Éireann	2-12	Crossmaglen Rangers	0-16
2022	Crossmaglen Rangers	1-19	Granemore	0-10
2023	Crossmaglen Rangers	2-16	Clan na Gael	1-07
2024	Clann Éireann	3-13	Clan na Gael	0-15
2025	Madden Raparees	0-20	St. Patrick's, Cullyhanna	0-09
2026	Crossmaglen Rangers	1-19	Killeavy St Monnina's	0-17

More information:

== Wins listed by club ==
#	Club	Wins	Years won
1	Crossmaglen Rangers	48	1906, 1908, 1911, 1912, 1913, 1923, 1924, 1925, 1926, 1927, 1933, 1936, 1937, 1947, 1960, 1962, 1965, 1966, 1967, 1970, 1975, 1977, 1983, 1986, 1996, 1997, 1998, 1999, 2000, 2001, 2002, 2003, 2004, 2005, 2006, 2007, 2008, 2010, 2011, 2012, 2013, 2014, 2015, 2018, 2019, 2022, 2023, 2026
2	Armagh Harps	21	1889, 1890, 1891, 1901, 1902, 1903, 1917, 1918, 1928, 1930, 1931, 1932, 1934, 1946, 1952, 1955, 1957, 1958, 1989, 1991, 2017
3	Clan na Gael	14	1949, 1950, 1968, 1969, 1971, 1972, 1973, 1974, 1976, 1980, 1981, 1987, 1993, 1994
4	Keady Dwyer's	4	1938, 1953, 1956, 1984
4	St Patrick's Carrickcruppen	4	1959, 1978, 1979, 1982
4	Pearse Óg GAC	4	1985, 1988, 1992, 2009
4	Clann Éireann	4	1954, 1963, 2021, 2024
8	Bessbrook Geraldines / An Sruthán	3	1909, 1916, 1939
8	Killeavy St Monnina's	3	1914, 1915, 1948
10	Shane O'Neill's	2	1907, 1910
10	Armagh Tír na nÓg	2	1904, 1935
10	St Michael's	2	1940, 1941
10	Mullaghbawn	2	1964, 1995
10	Maghery	2	2016, 2020
15	Whitecross	1	1905
15	Crossmaglen Red Hands	1	1906
15	Creggan Rovers	1	1908
15	Armagh St Malachy’s	1	1942
15	Wolfe Tones	1	1943
15	St Peter’s Sel	1	1944
15	St Malachy’s	1	1945
15	St Peter's	1	1951
15	Collegeland	1	1961
15	Sarsfields	1	1990
15	Madden Raparees	1	2025
