= St Paul's GFC, Lurgan =

Armagh-based Gaelic games club

St Paul's GFC
- Naomh Pól CLG
- Founded: 1971
- County: Armagh
- Colours: Green, white and gold
- Grounds: The Playing Fields (Na Páirceanna Imearthea)

Playing kits
Standard colours

St Paul's Gaelic Football Club (Irish: Naomh Pól CLG) is a GAA club in Lurgan, County Armagh, Northern Ireland. It plays Gaelic football at various age levels in Armagh GAA competitions, and is currently in the Armagh Intermediate Football Championship. Its ground is The Playing Fields (Irish: Na Páirceanna Imearthea).

== History ==
St Paul's was founded in 1971 in the Taghnevan housing estate in Lurgan, and seven years later won the county Junior Championship. The high point of the club's footballing history came in 1984, when it won the county Intermediate title.

== Facilities ==
St Paul's new playing fields were opened on 20 May 2012, with a challenge match between Armagh and Down. The Social Club hosts many community and cultural events.

== Notable players ==
- Andrew Murnin
- Mark Wilson

== Honours ==
- Armagh Intermediate Football Championship (2)
  - 1984, 2014
- Armagh Junior Football Championship (1)
  - 1978
- Armagh Intermediate Football League (1)
  - 2014
