= St Patrick's GFC, Cullyhanna =

Gaelic football club in County Armagh, Northern Ireland

St Patrick's, Cullyhanna
- Naomh Pádraig, Coilleach Eanach
- Founded: 1886
- County: Armagh
- Nickname: The Pats
- Colours: Black, Amber and Red
- Grounds: Páirc Pádraig, Cullyhanna

Playing kits
Standard colours

St Patrick's Gaelic Football Club (Irish: Naomh Pádraig, Coilleach Eanach) is a Gaelic Athletic Association club in southern County Armagh, Northern Ireland. It is part of the Armagh GAA, and is based in the townland and village of Cullyhanna.

The club plays Gaelic football in the Armagh Senior Championship, and the Senior and Junior All-County Leagues. It also fields ladies' Gaelic football and camogie teams.

== History ==
Having reached its first Armagh Intermediate Football Championship final in 1971, the club moved for a time into the Senior ranks, reaching the semi-final in 1974. In 1979 St Patrick's won the IFC, defeating Mullaghbawn by 0-7 to 0-5. The same clubs met again in the 1988 IFC final, St Pat's winning by 2-9 to 1-5. Twenty years later St Pat's again won the IFC, defeating Culloville by 13 points to 5. They beat Crossmaglen Rangers on 2 October 2016 to reach the Armagh Senior Championship final for the first time in their history.

The club acquired a 7-acre site on the Tullynavall Road, outside Cullyhanna, for £15,500 in the 1980s. A new pitch opened in 1986. A social club has since been erected on the site, using voluntary labour.

== Notable players ==
- Jason Duffy
- Ciarán McKeever, Armagh U21 and Senior player, member of 2008, 2010 and 2011 Ireland international rules football teams
- Ross McQuillan
- Aidan Nugent

== Honours ==
- Armagh Senior Football Championship (0)
  - Runners-up 2013, 2016
- All-Ireland Intermediate Club Football Championship (1)
  - 2023–24
- Ulster Intermediate Club Football Championship (1)
  - 2023
- Armagh Intermediate Football Championship (4)
  - 1979, 1988, 2008, 2023
- Armagh Under-21 Football Championship (5):
  - 1992, 2011, 2013, 2014, 2015
