= Middletown GAA =

Armagh-based Gaelic games club

Middletown GAC
- Coillidh Chanannáin
- Founded: 1900
- County: Armagh
- Colours: Black and White
- Grounds: P. J. O'Neill Park
- Coordinates: 54°17′48″N 6°50′50″W

Playing kits
Standard colours

Senior Club Championships
	All Ireland	Ulster champions	Armagh champions
Hurling:	-	-	20

Middletown Eoghan Rua Gaelic Athletic Club, also known as Eoghan Ruadh (Owen Roe's), is a GAA club from Middletown, County Armagh, Northern Ireland. The club fields teams from under-6 level to senior level in Gaelic football, hurling and camogie; all teams use the club colours of black and white with the males playing with vertical stripes. Middletown has won many county championship and league titles, and has been successful in All Ireland club championships. The club plays at P.J. O'Neill Park (Irish: Páirc P.J. Uí Néill).

== History ==
The club was founded in the early 1900s. It was disbanded for a time in the 1960s, but was refounded in 1969. PJ O'Neill Park on Tullybrick Lane was founded in 1984.

== Hurling ==
The club plays as Na Fianna in hurling, and has won the Armagh Senior Hurling Championship 20 times. They completed an historic 7 in a row in September 2025 with a win against Keady in the final.

=== Honours ===
- All-Ireland Intermediate Club Hurling Championship Runners-up 2012
- Ulster Intermediate Club Hurling Championship (2)
  - 2011, 2017
- Armagh Senior Hurling Championship (20)
  - 1981, 1985, 1986, 1991, 1995, 1999, 2000, 2006, 2009, 2011, 2012, 2015, 2016 2017, 2019, 2020, 2021, 2022, 2023, 2024, 2025

== Gaelic football ==
The club plays as Eoghan Ruadh in football.

=== Honours ===
- Armagh Intermediate Football Championship (1)
  - 1976
- Armagh Junior Football Championship (2)
  - 1974, 2008

== Camogie ==
The club's camogie teams play as St John's.

== Facilities ==
Middletown's GAA pitch is called P.J. O'Neill Park, named after P.J. O'Neill who was prominent in the establishment of the club. A new pitch named Barret Field was opened beside it in 2009, to keep with the high demand of training space for Middletown's various teams and to encourage younger members' involvement in Gaelic games.
