= Clan na Gael GAA (Armagh) =

Armagh-based Gaelic games club

Clan na Gael Gaelic Athletic Club
- CLG Clan na Gael
- Founded: 1922
- County: Armagh
- Nickname: The Clans, The Blues
- Coordinates: 54°27′44.01″N 6°20′55.13″W

Playing kits
Standard colours

Clan na Gael Gaelic Athletic Club (Irish: CLG Clan na Gael) is a Gaelic Athletic Association club situated in the town of Lurgan, County Armagh, Northern Ireland. The club's pitch, Davitt Park, is named in honour of Michael Davitt, also the original club name.

== History ==
The club, as Clan na Gael, was formed in 1922 in the Francis Street area following the demise of its long standing predecessor, The Michael Davitts. The club has been quite successful over the decades, bettered only in Armagh by Crossmaglen Rangers. Clan na Gael's height of dominance came in the 1970s, when the club won the Ulster Club Championship three times, and reached the final of the All-Ireland Club Championship, only to be beaten in a replay by University College Dublin, who had a high number of inter-county players in their squad. However, recently championship success has been minimal at senior level, the last Armagh Senior Championship was won by the club was in 1994, but winning the Armagh Intermediate Championship in 2021, has allowed the club to return to Senior level.

The club came to its lowest point for a long time when it was relegated in 2004 from the Armagh All County League Division I to the All County League Division II, for only the second time in the history of the club (and the League). Things however improved with the club retaining ACL Division I status in 2005 and also having a run in the Armagh Championship, reaching the semi-final only to be beaten after a replay with Dromintee. In 2006 Clan na Gael was beaten by Crossmaglen in the final. They reached the 2008 quarter-finals but were beaten by Crossmaglen and again in 2009 by Armagh Harps after a replay. Since 2013 the club was competing in the county's Intermediate Championship, returning to Senior Championship in 2021.

== Achievements ==
- Armagh Senior Football Championship: (14)
  - 1949, 1950, 1968, 1969, 1971, 1972, 1973, 1974, 1976, 1980, 1981, 1987, 1993, 1994
- Ulster Senior Club Football Championship: (3)
  - 1972, 1973, 1974
- All-Ireland Senior Club Football Championship: Runner-Up 1974
- Armagh Intermediate Football Championship: (2)
  - 1965, 2020

== Notable players ==
- Stefan Campbell
- Diarmaid Marsden, Ulster Championship Winner, All-Ireland winner with Armagh in 2002, and an ex All-star
- Barry O'Hagan, Ulster Championship winner, All-Ireland winner with Armagh in 2002
- Hugh Kelly, Northern Ireland soccer international goalkeeper
- Jimmy Smyth, 1977 All Star, captained Armagh in the 1977 All-Ireland Senior Football Championship final, later a BBC commentator
