= St Patrick's Carrickcruppen GFC =

Armagh-based Gaelic games club

Carrickcruppen St Patrick's GAA
- CLG Naomh Pádraig, Carraig Chrupáin
- Founded: 1944
- County: Armagh
- Nickname: Cruppen
- Colours: Red and white
- Grounds: Páirc Naomh Pádraig

Playing kits
Standard colours

St Patrick's Carrickcruppen Gaelic Football Club (GAA, Irish: CPG Naomh Pádraig, Carraig Chrupáin) is a Gaelic Athletic Association club within Armagh GAA. It is one of three GAA clubs in the village of Camlough, near Newry, in the south-east of Armagh (the others being Shane O'Neill's and Craobh Rua Camlocha hurling club).

It currently plays Gaelic football in the Armagh Senior Championship, and in the Armagh Senior League.

== History ==
The club was founded in 1944. The founding members were Oliver Loughran, Colin Crilly, Paddy Carlisle, Bobby Browne and James Galloghly. Magill's field was the club's pitch for many years, before its relocation to the current grounds on Lowes Lane.

To date Carrickcruppen has won four Armagh Senior Championships.

In 1979 Carrickcruppen lost the Ulster Senior Club Football Championship to Scotstown of Monaghan.

The camogie team associated with the club has produced players who have represented Armagh and Ulster.

== Notable players ==
- Blaine Hughes
- Billy Joe Padden, former Mayo and Armagh player

== Honours ==
- Armagh Senior Football Championship (4)
  - 1959, 1978, 1979, 1982
- Armagh Intermediate Football Championship (3)
  - 2004, 2021, 2024
- Armagh Under-21 Football Championship (2)
  - 2007, 2008
- Armagh Under-21 Intermediate Football Championship (1)
  - 2019
- Armagh Under-16 Championship (1)
  - 1993
- Armagh Minor Division 3 Championship (1)
  - 2017
