= Maghery Sean MacDermott's GAC =

Armagh-based Gaelic games club

- CLG Sheáin Mhic Diarmada, An Mhachaire
- Founded: 1906
- County: Armagh
- Nickname: Loughshore Club
- Colours: Blue with Gold Hoop
- Grounds: Felix Hamill Park
- Coordinates: 16 Dudley Hill 54°30′47.93″N 6°34′30.91″W

Playing kits
Standard colours

Maghery Sean MacDermott's GAC (Irish: CLG Sheáin Mhic Diarmada, An Mhachaire) is a Gaelic Athletic Association (GAA) club from Maghery, County Armagh, Northern Ireland. The club's home ground is Felix Hamill Park which opened in 2003 (formerly St Mary's GAA Park, opened 1956)

== History ==
The club was founded in 1906 and plays in blue with a gold hoop. The club fields football teams at senior, u-21, minor, u-16, u-14, u-12 u-10, u-8 and u-6 levels.

Maghery Sean MacDermott's GAC won their first Armagh Senior Football Championship on 16 October 2016 beating St. Patrick's Cullyhanna at the Athletic Grounds in Armagh.

== Facilities ==
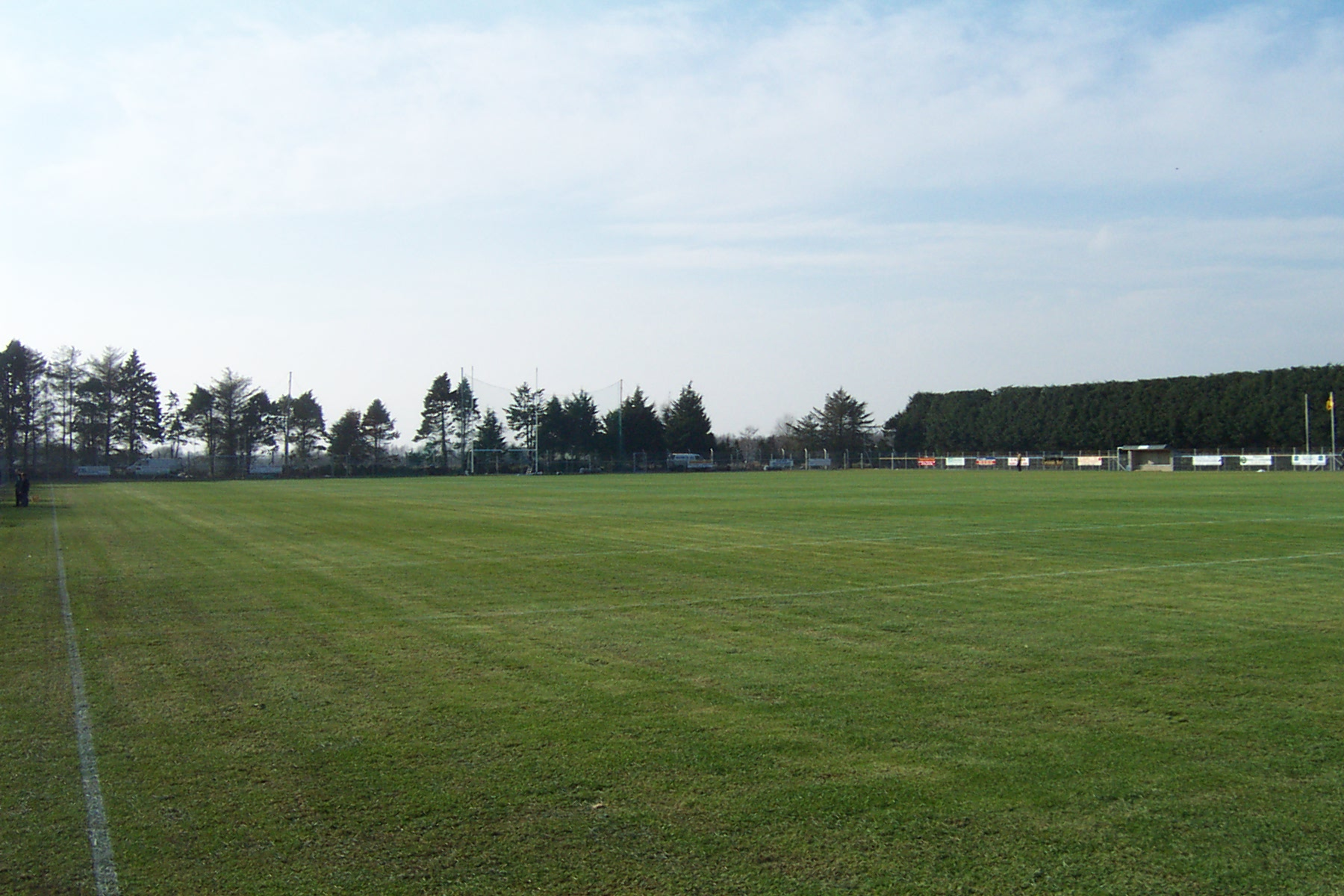
Felix Hamill Park, taken in March 2003 just before the official opening

The home ground of Maghery GAC is Felix Hamill Park. It was officially opened on Sunday 13 April 2003. Prior to this the ground was known as St Mary's GAA Park (opened 1956).

The first match to be played on Felix Hamill Park was between Armagh and Westmeath and took place on Sunday 16 March 2003. The official opening took place on Sunday 13 April 2003 with a blessing by Most Reverend Sean Brady Archbishop of Armagh. Other guests at the official opening were: Sean Kelly (GAA President), John O'Reilly (Ulster GAA President), Peter Quinn (Former GAA President), Joe Jordan (Armagh County Board)

As well as hosting all home games of all Maghery GAC teams, Felix Hamill Park also hosts Armagh club championship games and Ulster Colleges games.

Felix Hamill park is located on Derrywarragh Island and is flanked along its south side by Maghery Canal and along its west side by the River Blackwater.

== Notable players ==
- Ben Crealey

== Football titles ==
- Armagh Senior Football Championship (2)
  - 2016, 2020
- Armagh Intermediate Football Championship (1)
  - 2003
- Armagh Junior Football Championship (3)
  - 1937, 1958, 1961
- Armagh Under 21 Football Championship (1)
  - 1982
- Armagh Minor Football Championship (3)
  - 1974, 1978, 1988
- Armagh Minor League (1)
  - 1988
- Armagh All County League Division 1 (7)
  - 1970, 1982, 1987, 1993, 2012, 2013,2019
- Armagh All County League Division 2 (1)
  - 2004
- North Armagh Football Championship (1)
  - 1989
