= Killeavy St Moninna's GAC =

Armagh-based Gaelic games club

Killeavy St Moninna's GAC/CAOLIN MACCA GAC
- CLG Naomh Moninne, Cill Shléibhe
- Founded: 1888
- County: Armagh
- Colours: Green and black
- Grounds: Killeavy Memorial Park (Páirc Chuimhneacháin Chill Shléibhe)

Playing kits
Standard colours

Killeavy Saint Moninna's Gaelic Athletic Club (Irish: CLG Naomh Moninne, Cill Shléibhe) is a Gaelic Athletic Association club based in Killeavy, County Armagh, near Newry, Northern Ireland. Killeavy won the 2012 Armagh Intermediate Football Championship and participates in other Armagh GAA football, ladies' football, hurling and camogie competitions. It is one of the largest clubs in the county, fielding upwards of 20 teams from Under-8 to Senior levels, and has been Ulster Club of the Year. The club's ground is Killeavy Memorial Park (Irish: Páirc Chuimhneacháin Chill Shléibhe).

== History ==
The club is one of the oldest in Armagh, having been founded in 1888. It marked its 125th anniversary in 2011 with a series of celebrations.

== Gaelic football ==
It is one of a small number of clubs to have won the county Junior, Intermediate and Senior titles.

Killeavy defeated Crossmaglen in 1914 to win the Armagh Senior Football Championship by 3-02 to 1-01. It retained the title in 1915, beating Bessbrook Geraldines 0-04 top 0-02. The club won the Armagh Junior Football Championship in 1932. In the 1948 Senior final Killeavy was leading St Peter's of Lurgan by 2-04 to 3 points when the match had to be abandoned.

Killeavy won the Armagh Junior title again in 1980. In 1986 the club lifted the Armagh Intermediate Football Championship title, defeating Grange 1-15 to 1-11 in a reply. The club appeared again in the 2012 IFC final, defeating St Peter's by 0-15 to 2-08.

In 2009 Killeavy provided three players - James Donnelly, Kealan Downey and Conor King - for the Armagh team that won the All-Ireland Minor Football Championship.

=== Notable players ===
- Stevie McDonnell, Armagh player 1999-2012, triple All Star
- Paul Watters, Armagh player, 2005 NFL winning team

=== Honours ===
- Ulster Minor Club Football Championship (1)
  - 1987; Runners-up 1996, Runners-up 2012.
- Armagh Senior Football Championship (3)^{†}
  - 1914, 1915, 1948^{†}; Runners-up 1924, 1951, 1955, 1988
- Armagh Intermediate Football Championship (2)
  - 1986, 2012, 2017; Runners-up 1966, 1983
- Armagh Junior Football Championship (2)
  - 1932, 1980
- Armagh Minor Football Championship (5)
  - 1954, 1987, 1996, 1997, 2012,

^{†} 1948 SFC final abandoned with Killeavy in lead

== Hurling ==
Eddie Fearon was the Armagh captain when they won the Allianz National Hurling League Division 3 Final on 30 April 2006, beating Longford in Kingspan Breffni Park, County Cavan - the first Armagh man to lift hurling silverware for the county in a long time.

Niall Benedict Oneill, midfield when playing for the Armagh junior championship winning team and put in man of the match display. With a score 0-0 from play (0-0f).

== Ladies' Gaelic football ==
=== Notable players ===
- Aileen Matthews, member of Armagh's 2005 All-Ireland Junior Championship winning team

== Camogie ==
There are under-8, under-10, under-12, under-14, under-16 and senior teams.

== Facilities ==
GAA President Seán Kelly opened Killeavy's new pitch in 2005, when Armagh beat Meath in a challenge match.

Activities organised by the social club include céilí dancing and whist.
