= Ballymacnab Round Towers GAC =

Armagh-based Gaelic games club

- Na Cloighthithe Baile Mhic an Aba
- Founded: 1925
- County: Armagh
- Nickname: The ‘Nab
- Colours: Maroon and White
- Grounds: Páirc na nGael

Playing kits
| Standard colours | Goalkeeper Colours |

Ballymacnab Round Towers Gaelic Athletic Club (Irish: CLG na gCloigthithe, Baile Mhic an Aba) is a Gaelic Athletic Association club within Armagh GAA. It is based in the townland and village of Ballymacnab in County Armagh, Ireland, in the parish of Cill Chluana, four miles south of the city of Armagh.

The club plays Gaelic football in the Armagh Intermediate Championship.

== History ==
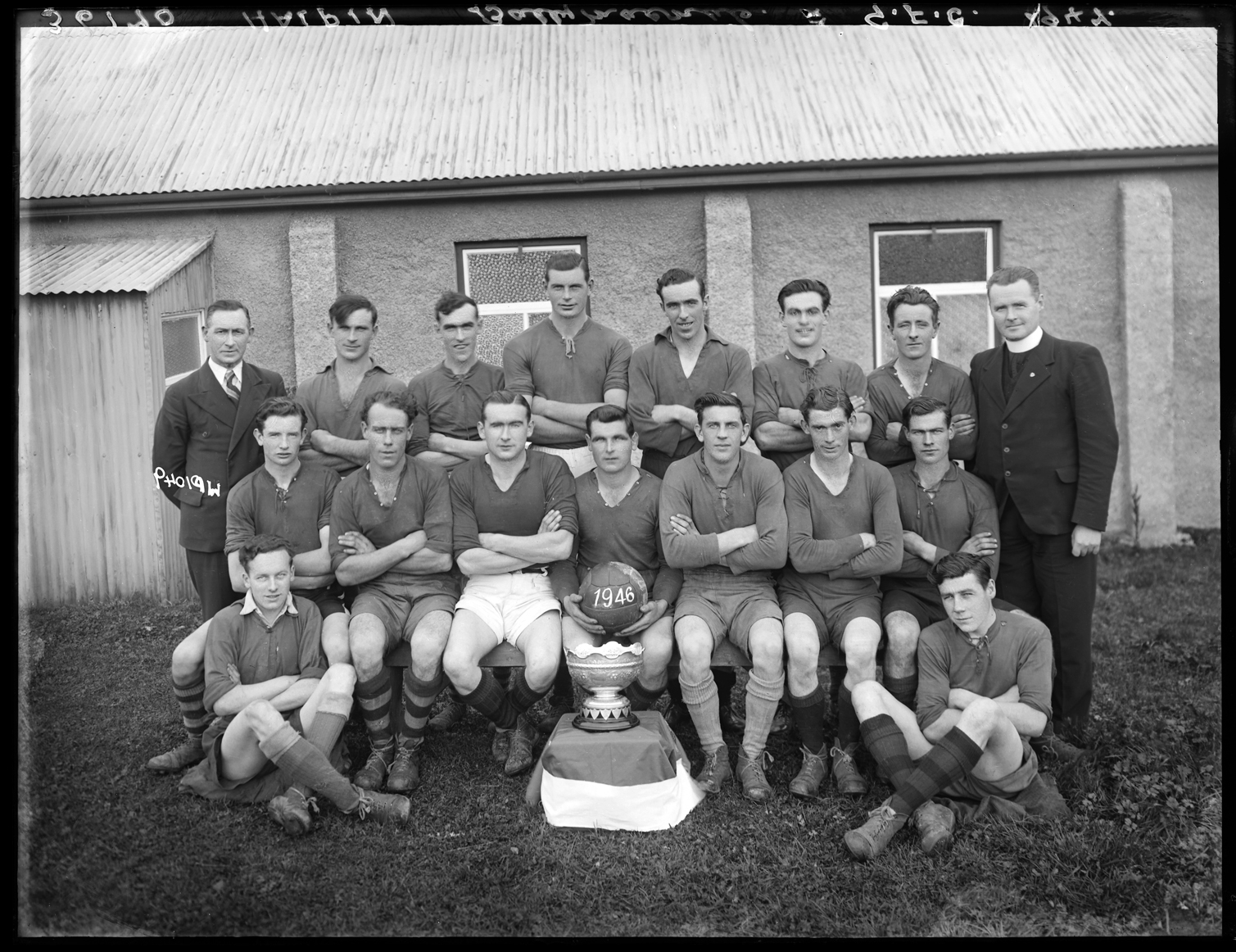
Mid Armagh Divisional Champions team, 1946.

In 1925 a short-lived Ballymacnab team, Brian Ógs, affiliated to the Armagh GAA Junior League. In the early 1930s a parish league was organised within Cill Chluana, out of which three clubs emerged over the following decades: Ballymacnab, Granemore and Clady. In the 1940s and 1950s the Ballymacnab Shamrocks participated in the Mid Armagh Junior League and Championships, reaching some championship and league finals, but winning only the Mid Armagh Divisional Championship in 1946.

In 1960 Ballymacnab had to amalgamate with Granemore to field a team known as Kilcluney. This team lasted only two years. After a hiatus, the Ballymacnab club was reformed as the Round Towers in 1967, and competed in Division IV of the Armagh League. The club reached Division II by 1969 but lost in the Junior Championship finals of 1969, 1971 and 1972.

In 1975 the club purchased the playing field where it had long been based, and redeveloped the grounds as Páirc na nGael, officially opened in 1981.

Ballymacnab won Division IV of the All-County League in 1980 and Division III in 1982. The club reached the Junior Finals of 1984, 1993 and 1994 and eventually won it in 1999. In 2005 the club won the Mid Armagh Shield and League Division III, and in 2006, the Intermediate Championship, going on to the Ulster Intermediate final. In 2010 the seniors won the ACL Division II, were promoted to Division 1 for the first time, retained that status in 2011 and reached their first County Senior Final. However, in the final they were comprehensively beaten by the favourites Crossmaglen Rangers, one of Ireland's most famous clubs who were making their 55th appearance in an Armagh Senior Final.

The club had All-Ireland wins in Scór competitions in 1996 and 1997.

Ballymacnab is also home to St Brenda's camogie club. They are the most successful club in Armagh with 18 County Championship titles.

== Honours ==
- Armagh Senior League Division 1B (1): 2022
- Armagh Senior League Division 1A (1): 2018
- Armagh Intermediate Football Championship (1): 2006
- Armagh Junior Football Championship (1): 1999

== Notable players ==
- Joe O'Hare, played on the Armagh team that reached the 1953 All-Ireland Final; also played for Minors
- Rory Grugan played a key role in Armagh’s 2009 All-Ireland Minor Football Championship victory over Mayo, with club teammate Gavin McPartland also featuring in the final. He has played senior football for Armagh since 2011 and captained the county in 2018, leading them to victory in the NFL Division 3 final, defeating Fermanagh 1-16 to 0–17. At club level, Grugan was instrumental in Ballymacnab Round Towers’ Division 1A league success in 2018. In 2022, he scored the second-fastest goal in All-Ireland Championship history against Donegal. He later won the 2024 All-Ireland Senior Football Championship with Armagh and briefly captained the team during the 2025 Ulster Championship.
