= Culloville Blues GAC =

Armagh-based Gaelic games club

- CLG Na Gormacha, Baile Mhic Cholla
- Founded: 1888
- County: Armagh
- Nickname: The Blues
- Colours: Blue and white

Playing kits
Standard colours

Culloville Blues Gaelic Athletic Club (Irish: CLG Na Gormacha, Baile Mhic Cholla) is a Gaelic Athletic Association club within Armagh GAA. It is based in the village of Culloville (often spelled Cullaville, possibly anglicised) in south County Armagh, Northern Ireland.

The club plays Gaelic football in the Armagh Senior Championship. The club has two playing fields. The main field is just south of the village, close to the Fane bridge, which marks the border with County Monaghan. A sister club competes in camogie.

== History ==
The present club is the successor to one of the earliest GAA clubs in Ireland, Culloville William O'Brien's, founded in 1888, and named after the then-imprisoned agrarian agitator and Member of Parliament. In 1910 a club named Culloville Sons of O'Connell was formed, named after the 19th-century Irish political leader Daniel O'Connell.

The present name, Culloville Blues, was registered in 1916, when the blue and white colours were adopted in place of the previous green and black. In 1918, political divisions in the district disrupted both the Blues and nearby Crossmaglen Rangers GAC, leading to the creation of Crossmaglen Plunketts, supported by republicans, and Clonalig Dillons, supported by Redmondites.

At various times other clubs or teams operated in or around Culloville, including the Corlis Mitchels, Creggan Red Hands, the Crievekiernan Harps and Mobane, all long defunct.

== Gaelic football ==
Culloville failed to field against Armagh Tír na nÓg in the 1904 Armagh Senior Football Championship final. Culloville lost other SFC finals in 1913 and 1916.

In 1931 the Blues again made the SFC final, the last occasion on which the club reached that level. Reduced to the lower ranks, Culloville won the Junior Championship in 1950 and 1975.

The Blues beat Ballyhegan by a point to win the Armagh Intermediate Football Championship in 1982, having been runners-up in 1977 and 1978. They drew the 1995 IFC final with Keady, but lost the replay. The IFC title returned to Culloville in 1998, with a 3-5 to 2-6 win over Portadown Tír na nÓg. Defeats in the 2007, 2008 and 2010 Intermediate finals were followed with a 4-13 to 1-9 win over Tír na nÓg in the 2011 final, allowing Culloville into the Senior ranks. The club lost the 2011 Ulster Intermediate Club Football Championship by a single point to Craigbane of Derry GAA.

=== Honours ===
- Armagh Intermediate Football Championship (3)
  - 1982, 1998, 2011
- Armagh Intermediate Football League (3)
  - 2001, 2016, 2023
- Armagh Junior Football Championship (2)
  - 1950, 1975

== Camogie ==
The Culloville Camogie Club fields teams at senior and under-8, U-10, U-12 and U-14 age levels.

== Facilities ==
Together with Cullaville Development Association, the club has secured planning permission for the construction of a community centre and clubhouse to include meeting rooms, a main hall, a fitness suite and changing rooms.
