= Armagh Harps GFC =

Armagh-based Gaelic games club

Armagh Harps
- Cláirsigh Ard Mhacha
- Founded: 1888
- County: Armagh
- Nickname: The Harps
- Colours: White and blue
- Grounds: Páirc na Mainistreach
- Coordinates: 54°21′32.93″N 6°39′38.66″W

Playing kits
Standard colours

Senior Club Championships
	All Ireland	Ulster champions	Armagh champions
Football:	0	0	21

Armagh Harps Gaelic Football Club is a Gaelic Athletic Association (GAA) club in the city of Armagh, County Armagh, Northern Ireland. It plays exclusively Gaelic football in the Senior competitions of Armagh GAA. Its home ground is Páirc na Mainistreach, also known as Abbey Park, in the north of Armagh city.

The club has won the Armagh Senior Football Championship 21 times.

== History ==
Founded in 1888 by Charles O’Neil 1846-1940, the Harps represented Armagh in the 1890 Ulster Final, beating Cookstown's Owen Roes, but losing to All-Ireland Champions Midleton of Cork in the All-Ireland Semi-Final. Football declined somewhat in the period 1910-1915, but revived in 1916 when it appears that the Harps reformed under a new name, Young Ireland. Another Armagh City club, St Malachy's, was active in the 1940s.

The Armagh Harps were recreated under the original name in 1945.

== Honours ==
- Armagh Senior Football Championship (21)
  - 1889, 1890, 1891, 1901, 1902, 1903, 1917, 1918, 1928, 1930, 1931, 1932, 1934, 1946, 1952, 1955, 1957, 1958, 1989, 1991, 2017

== Notable players ==
- Joe McElroy, Armagh senior player
- Charlie Vernon - Armagh player 2006-2019, 2 time ulster title winner.
- Colin Holmes - Tyrone player 1996-2009, club captain
- Declan McKenna - 2009 All Ireland minor winning captain

== Facilities ==
The club acquired its present grounds, Páirc na Mainistreach, in 1979, and the development of the pitch was completed in 1984. Since then the club has developed dressing rooms, an all-weather pitch, car parking area, a covered stand for 500 spectators and floodlighting. In 1980 the Harps opened a social club on Loughgall Road, Armagh.

== Website ==
- Harps website
