= Brian Mac Giolla Phádraig =

Brian Mac Giolla Phádraig (c. 1580 – 1653) was an Irish poet and priest. He is not to be confused with any of the Barons of Upper Ossory, his relations, several of whom bore the same name in Irish.

== Background ==
Mac Giolla Phádraig was descended from a dynasty of the Gaelic nobility of Ireland that had ruled Ossory since before the 8th century. Only a handful of his works of Irish bardic poetry are extant. A cry of despair against the Cromwellian conquest of Ireland, and its consequences for the world and class to which he belonged, his Faisean Chláir Éibhir bears a striking resemblance to the poetry of the great Dáibhí Ó Bruadair: "A trick of this false world has laid me low: servants in every home with grimy English but no regard for one of the poet class save "Out! and take your precious Gaelic with you!"

Mac Giolla Phádraig was ordained a priest in 1610. In 1622 he made a copy of the Leabhar Branach, a book of Irish poetry in praise of four of the O'Byrne chieftains of Ranelagh; it is thanks to this copy that the poems survive. Around the year 1651 he was appointed vicar general and apostolic vicar of the diocese of Ossory, which covers County Kilkenny and western County Laois. He was killed by Oliver Cromwell's forces shortly afterwards.

In Threnodia Hiberno-Catholica, his death is described: "He was pursued into a cave by the heretics, who there cut off his head, placed it on a pole at the gates of a certain town and left his body to be devoured by the wild beasts." The historian William Carrigan writes that according to local oral tradition, a slaughter was committed at a Mass rock in Tinwear, a quarter of a mile from Durrow. According to Fearghus Ó Fearghail in Kilkenny History and Society, "Bernard Fitzpatrick, who had administered the díocese after Bishop Rothe’s death from his hiding place in his ancestral home in County Laois, was tracked down and killed in 1653."

A memorial to Mac Giolla Phádraig stands in the square in Durrow.

== Faisean Chláir Éibhir ==
The full title comes from its first line: Och mo chreachsa faisean chláir Éibhir. Mac Giolla Phádraig's most famous work deplored the anglicisation of ordinary poor Irish farm labourers, pejoratively known as churls, in the 1600s. He considered that formerly they were poorer and more respectful of his Church and Gaelic culture, but were now starting to adopt materialism and the English language. Extracts give a flavour:

‘… each beggarwoman’s son has curled locks, bright cuffs about his paw, and a golden ring like a prince of the blood of Cas.. each churl or his son is starched up around the chin, a scarf thrown around him and a garter on him, his tobacco-pipe in his gob.. his knuckles bedecked with bracelets.. a churl in each house that is owned by a speaker of horrible English and no-one paying any heed to a man of the poetic company, save for "Get out, and take your precious Gaelic with you".'

Is cor do leag mé cleas an phlás-tsaoile:
mogh i ngach teach ag fear an smáil-Bhéarla
's gan scot ag neach le fear den dáimh éigse
ach 'hob amach is beir leat do shár-Gaeilgsa'

== See also ==
- Fitzpatrick/Mac Giolla Phádraig
- Piaras Feiritéar
- Dáibhí Ó Bruadair
- Cathal Buí Mac Giolla Ghunna
- Peadar Ó Doirnín
- Séamas Dall Mac Cuarta
- Art Mac Cumhaigh
- Aogán Ó Rathaille
- Eoghan Rua Ó Súilleabháin
- Seán Clárach Mac Dónaill
