= Donnchadh Mac an Caoilfhiaclaigh =

17th century Irish poet

Donnchadh Mac an Caoilfhiaclaigh was a 17th-century Irish poet. The poem Do frith, monuar an uain si ar Éirinn is attributed to him. Do frith links the disunity among Irish, which led to their defeat in the Irish Confederate Wars, with God's displeasure. Part of the poems states:

"Not this, I think, but God's revenge ... and not two of the group submitting one to the other, or yet to an individual who would be a support with whom to make a stand."

== See also ==
- Cathal Buí Mac Giolla Ghunna
- Peadar Ó Doirnín
- Séamas Dall Mac Cuarta
- Art Mac Cumhaigh
- Seán Clárach Mac Domhnaill
- Eoghan Rua Ó Súilleabháin
