= Raghnall Dall Mac Domhnaill =

Irish poet

Raghnall Dall Mac Domhnaill (fl. c. 1681–c. 1715) was an Irish poet.

== Biography ==
Mac Domhnaill was an associate and friend to other local poets such as "Art Mac Cumhaigh ... Pádraig Mac a Liondain, Feargas Mac a' Bheatha, Bobby Bán Mac Gránna or Grant, James Woods of Loughross, and ... Séamus Mór Mac Murchaidh", all buried in Creggan graveyard (Trimble, 2018, p. 92).

Mac Domhnaill is principally known through only two surviving poems, Brian Ó Cuagáin and A Chreagáin Uaibhrigh ('O Proud Creggan'). The popularity of the latter poem was expressed by its survival "in the manuscripts of the local scribal tradition, of which there are 6 known copies to-date in existence ranging from the earliest transcribed in 1759 up to the most recent in 1856 which was penned by one of our last local professional Gaelic scribes, Art Bennet of Ballykeel" (Trimble, 2018, p. 93).

The subject of this poem was the large tree that was planted by Art the son of Hugh O'Neill in the year 1390 [actually 1490] on the south side of Creggan old church opposite the Altar. Its spreading branches extended over the vault of that proud family. It was cut down ... on the 7th January 1715 to the great dissatisfaction and bitter mortification of the survivors of that once Arrogant family, but Rector Atkinson closed up the vault since and one tombstone only points out where it once stood.

Mac Domhnaill was incorrectly cited by both Rev. Paul O'Brien of Maynooth and Henry Morris as a native of Donegal, yet Art Mac Cumhaigh, "clearly identifies Mac Domhnaill as a major local poet of the same stature of Séamas Dall Mac Cuarta and Pádraig Mac a Liondan." (Trimble, 2018, p. 99).

Trimble attributes much of this to "the absence of details on the poet himself in the extant manuscripts ... because no communal memory at all of Mac Domhnaill or his poetry was transmitted or preserved in the all-important oral tradition of the remaining native Irish speakers of the area." (Trimble, 2018, p. 100). The kindred had settled "in the Fews area by the beginning of the 17th century with 20 recorded families of the surname as well as over 20 other settled kinsmen using the alternative family surnames of McKeever/McIvor and McKeown." (101) Furthermore, a "Roland MacDonnell" was recorded in the Hearth Money Rolls of 1664 "as a tenant in the townland of Knockavannon" (Trimble, 2018, p. 103)

The Omeath poet Niall óg Mha' Mhurchaidh ... composed a panegyric poem on his friend Raghnall Dall Mac Domhnaill entitled Admhuighim Ós Árd ('I Publicly Acknowledge') ... preserved in a manuscript dating from 1759"; a scribal notes that Mac Domhnaill "went away to Co Down". (104). He may also have spent time abroad to avoid persecution around the time of the trial of Archbishop Oliver Plunkett in 1681.

Mac Domhnaill's only other known surviving poem was co-written with Pádraig Mac a Liondain. Titled Brian Ó Cuagáin, it is "a bitter satirical poem ... on a rival poet from Co. Meath." (Trimble, 2018, p. 109), which Trimble dates to about 1691. Summing him up, Trimble wrote:

Mac Domhnaill's ability as a master poet was clearly appreciated, not just by Mac Cumhaigh and that later generation of poets, but also by his own contemporaries, and in addition to his joint-composition by Mac a liondain, his other good friend Niall og Mha' Mhurchaidh [who] lauds him with the title Oide na nDán ('Tutor of the Poems'). We can determine that Mha' Mhurchaidh's poem in praise of Mac Domhnaill .... coincides with his departure from the Fews around the beginning of the 18th century. A line in the poem Chuaigh a thaisteal na bóchna roughly translates as 'travelling across the ocean', and is suggestive that the poet may have ventured to the Continent where many of his exiled kinsmen would have fled in previous years.

Mha' Mhurchaidh's poem was written by Pádraig Ó Pronntaigh, himself a young apprentice to Pádraig Mac a Liondain from the 1720s onwards and from whom he obtained this poem and the poems of Raghnall Dall Mac Domnaill. Niall og Mha' Murhcaidh died in 1714 and this event itself may be the reason for the return of Mac Domhnaill to the Fews. His pom on Creggan ... firmly places him in the area in the 1715 however it would appear in the following years that he no longer composed any more poetry and likely had left the area once more. We can assume from the scribe Ó Pronntaigh, whilst regularly in Mac a Liondain's house during the 1720s, that he did not personally encounter Mac Domhnaill. It is important also to note that Mac Domhnaill was not part of the delegation of local poets which welcomed the famed poet and harper Toirealach Dall Ó Cearullain ... to the area in 1732. More significantly, there is no evidence of a customary eulogy ever having been composed for Mac Domhnaill by any of his brother-poets but with the death of his old friend Padraig Mac a Liondain in 1732, his reputation among both the local community and the local Gaelic literati would continue to fade further into obscurity. (Trimble, 2018, p. 111-112)

== See also ==
- Randal MacDonnell, 1st Marquess of Antrim (1645 creation)
- Diarmuid Mac Muireadhaigh
- Peadar Ó Doirnín
- Florence MacMoyer
- Clandeboye
