= Séafraidh Ó Donnchadha =

17th century Irish poet

Ó Donnchadha an Ghleanna
- Reign: 1643 – 1678
- Predecessor: Tadhg Ó Donnchadha an Ghleanna
- Successor: Domhnall Ó Donnchadha an Ghleanna
- Born: c. 1620; County Kerry, Kingdom of Ireland
- Died: c. 1678; County Kerry, Kingdom of Ireland
- Burial: Muckross Abbey, County Kerry
- Religion: Roman Catholic

Séafraidh Ó Donnchadha an Ghleanna anglicised as Geoffrey O’Donoghue of the Glens (c.1620–1678), was a seventeenth century Irish clan chief and Irish language poet. He was one of the Four Kerry Poets, a collective name given to four 17th and 18th century poets from County Kerry.

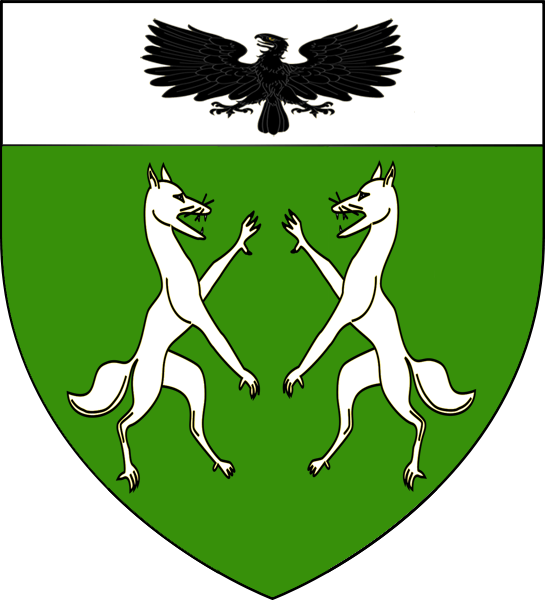
Ó Donnchadha

== Early life ==
He was the son of Tadhg Ó Donnchadha an Ghleanna, who was the chief of lands centered around Glenflesk which contained 20 ploughlands. His mother was Eibhlín, daughter of Tadhg Óg Ó Cruadhlaoich. The family seat was Killaha Castle which was built in the 15th century. It overlooked the Flesk valley and the river below. It was a five-storey tower-house that commanded the approaches to the Glen. There was a cellar, part of which acted as a dungeon, with another area containing the family burial vault. The castle, long derelict, still stands, with the N22 road between Killarney and Cork now adjacent to it.

== Rebellion, accession to chieftaincy, and destruction of castle ==
The poet together with his father and two brothers were amongst the Irish rebels who from 14 February 1642 laid siege to Tralee Castle. The English settlers fled for safety into Tralee Castle. The siege lasted about 6 months. The settlers surrendered and the rebels captured the castle around 20 August 1642.

Later, the poet acceded to the chieftaincy around 1643 following his father's death. The poet's house was described as “a safe haven for persecuted bards”. A grateful poet left a vivid picture of life in Killaha Castle during the days of the Revolution when the poet extended an open-hearted welcome to his brother bards:

The house of Geoffrey - short seems the night to hundreds; House of accomplishments, in which songs are sung to harps; House of festivity and hospitality, in which wines are drunk; House of bestowing, in which bards are rewarded substantially; Stronghold of the clergy, where Latin is fluently read; Stronghold, where the maidens embroider silken robes; Stronghold, liberal in dispensing gems to sons of princes; Stronghold of gifts unceasingly given to guests, Mansion of heroes, unsubdued by wicked threats; Mansion of wonders, of the valiant man who stored not jewels; Mansion of verses freely running to honour nobles; Mansion of airiness is the Gaelic dwelling, roomy and delightful.

In 1652 Kilaha Castle was hit with newly employed cannon by General Ludlow’s army during the Cromwellian conquest of Ireland. The castle was partially destroyed.

With the Castle ruined “[t]he Glen became the home of Tories, Robbers, and Rapparees, Persons of the Romish Religion, out in arms and upon their keeping. It was these tories that made it secure to carry on the crime of school teaching in Killarney. A few extracts from the correspondence with Dublin Castle, of some Kerry magistrates and others, gives some idea of the part played by Glenflesk and its Chieftain, in the social struggle; whose centre was Killarney, and in whose vortex the years of our poet's manhood were passed.”

== Family and death ==
The poet married first (a.1643) Siobhán, second daughter of Domhnall Mac Fínghin and Elizabeth Stephenson, and later Alice, eldest daughter of Dominick Coppinger of Cork and Mary Coppinger (née Comine).

He managed to hold on to his lands during even during the years of the Commonwealth of England, Scotland and Ireland he lived through. Burke's The Landed Gentry of Ireland refers to him. He had three sons Domhnall, Fionán, Séafraidh. He made a will on 19 January 1677 which was proved 22 March 1678.

He died in 1678 and was survived by Alice and three children, one of whom, Domhnall, was his heir. He is believed to be buried in the O'Donoghue tomb in the chancel of Muckross Abbey near Killarney.

== Legacy ==
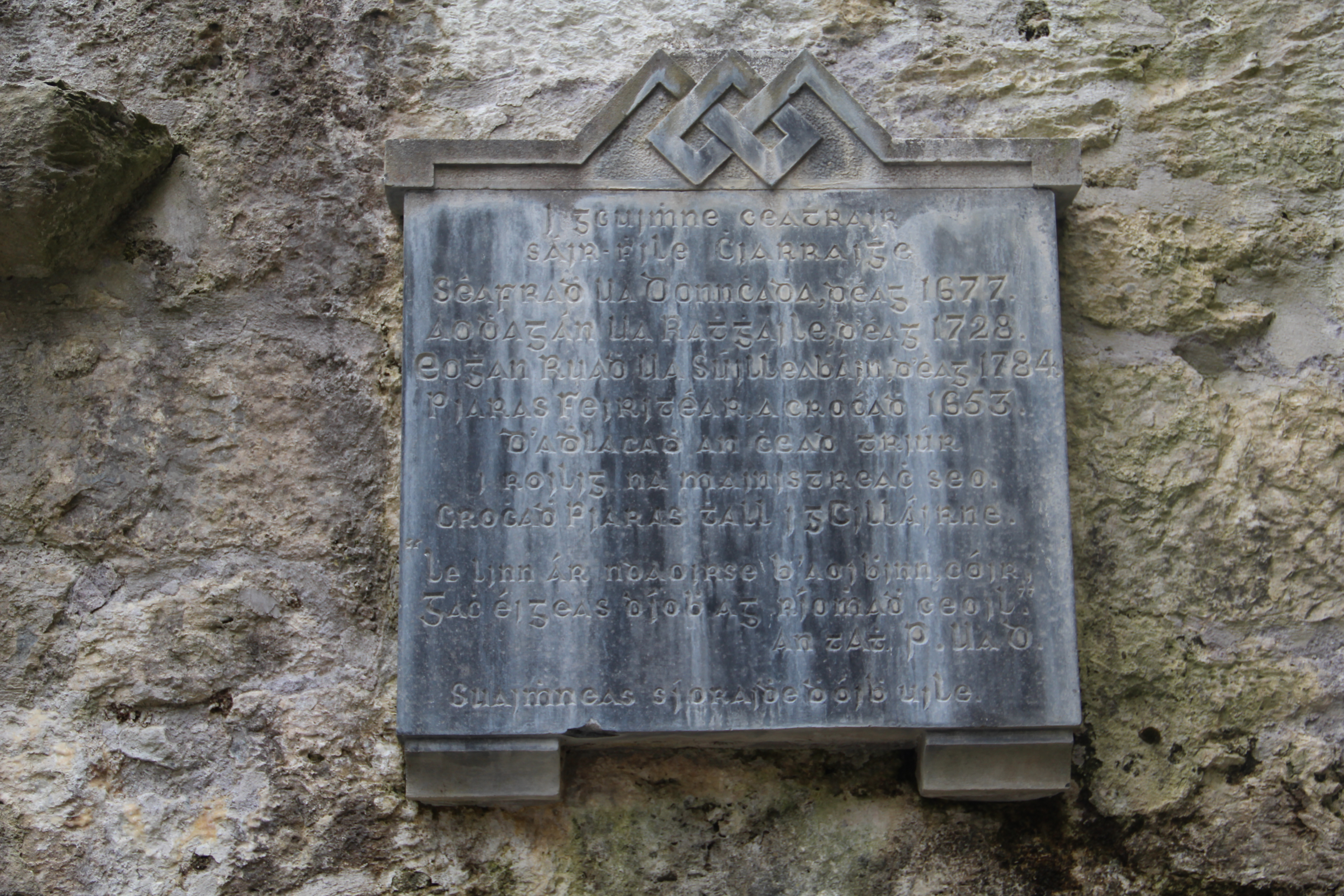
Memorial to the "Four Kerry Poets" (Piaras Feiritéar, Séafraidh Ó Donnchadha, Aogán Ó Rathaille, and Eoghan Rua Ó Súilleabháin) in Muckross Abbey, Killarney.

Dánta Shéafraidh Uí Dhonnchadha an Ghleanna edited by Pádraig Ua Duinnín and published in 1902 contains a compendium of the works of the poet. A translation into English by John Minahane was published in 2008.

There is a memorial to Séafraidh Ó Donnchadha an Ghleanna and the other three of the Four Kerry Poets from the Early Modern period, Piaras Feiritéar, Aodhagan Ó Rathaille and Eoghan Rua Ó Súilleabháin in the form of a sculpture of a spéirbhean (a dream woman, symbol of Ireland) with the names of all four poets carved into it in Killarney town.

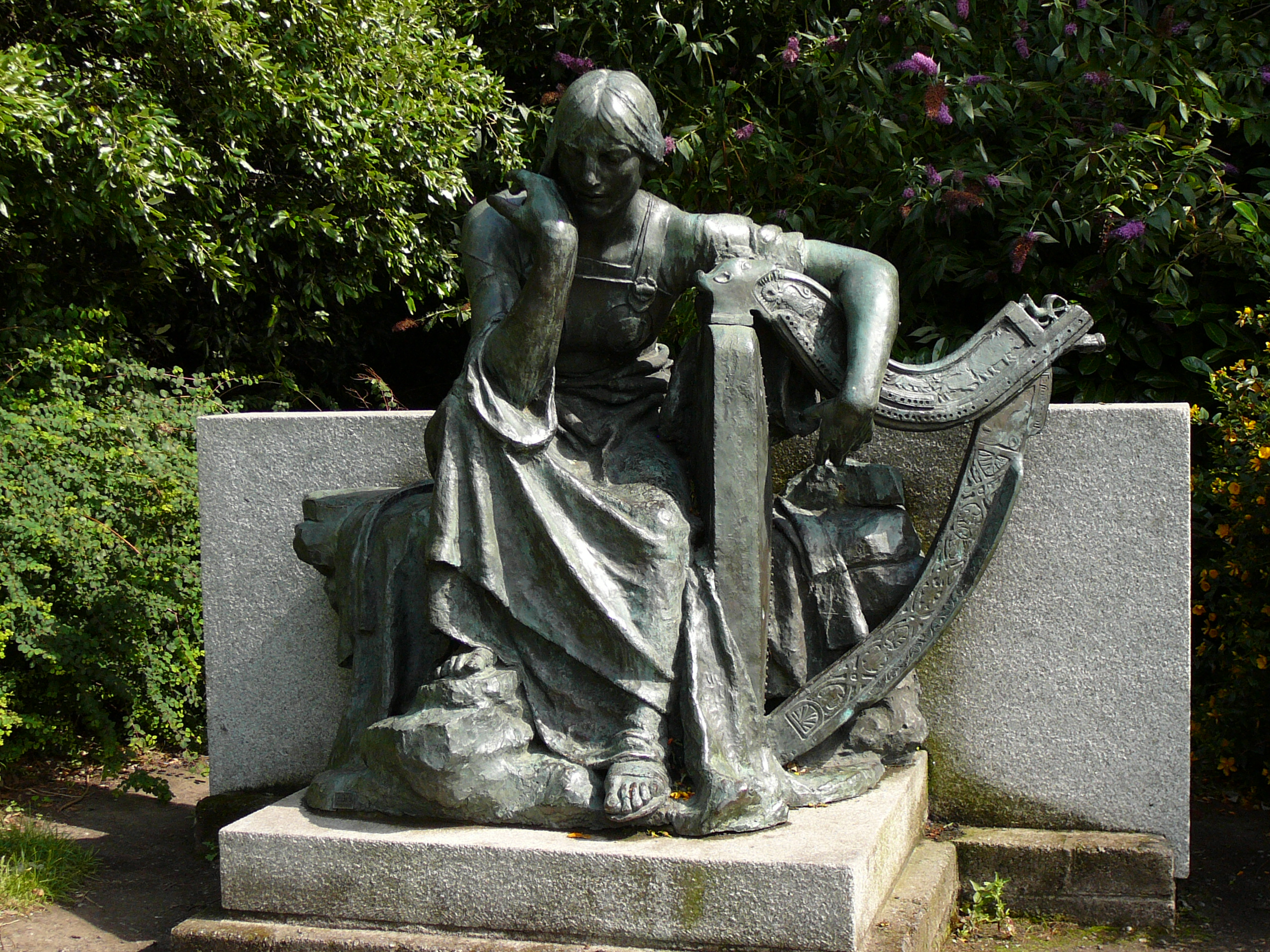
Memorial to the "Four Kerry Poets", Éire, in Merrion Square, Dublin

Another memorial to the Four Kerry Poets, originally intended for Killarney, can today be seen in Merrion Square, Dublin is the work of Jerome Connor. It is a seated figure of Éire, the warrior queen, and her harp, sad but strangely defiant.

There is also a memorial to the Four Kerry Poets at Muckross Abbey.
