= Red Hanrahan =

Red Hanrahan may refer to:

- Owen Red Hanrahan, a fictional character in several works by William Butler Yeats
- Peter Red Hanrahan, a fictional character in Anne McCaffrey's novel Dragonsdawn
