= Leabhar Cloinne Aodha Buidhe =

17th century Irish poem book

Leabhar Cloinne Aodha Buidhe, or Book of the Clandeboy O'Neill's, is the title of a dunaire, or poem-book, of the Clandeboye branch of the O'Neill dynasty. It was written by the scribe Ruairí Ó hUiginn of Sligo, at the request of Cormac Ó Neill, in 1680.

It contains some late medieval content, such as the "Ceart Uí Néill" which includes a list of tributes claimed by the clan throughout Ulster. Poems include those authored by members of the bardic families of Ó Gnímh, Mac an Bhaird, Ó Maolconaire and Mac Muireadhaigh.

David Sellar, who was the Lord Lyon King of Arms in Scotland, stated that it dates from 1680.

== See also ==
- Irish annals

== Sources ==
- Oxford Concise Companion to Irish Literature, Robert Welsh, 1996. ISBN 0-19-280080-9
- Duffy, Seán (2005). Medieval Ireland: An Encyclopedia. Taylor & Francis. ISBN 9781135948245.

== External Source ==
- Leabhar Cloinne Aodha Buidhe Edited by Thadhg O' Donnchadha, D.Litt. (Dublin, 1931) at the Internet Archive
