= Suantraí dá Mhac Tabhartha =

Irish language poem

Suantraí dá Mhac Tabhartha, also known as Lullaby to his Illegitimate Son, is an Irish-language poem by Eoghan Rua Ó Súilleabháin (c. 1748 – 29 June 1782).
