= An Bonnán Buí =

Irish poem by Cathal Buí Mac Giolla Ghunna

"An Bonnán Buí" (pronounced [ənˠ ˈbɔn̪ˠaːnˠ ˈbˠiː]; "The yellow bittern") is a classic poem in Irish by the poet Cathal Buí Mac Giolla Ghunna. In addition to the conventional end-rhyme, it uses internal rhyme ("A bhonnán bhuí, is é mo léan do luí / Is do chnámha sínte tar éis do ghrinn") – in the Irish language all the italicised elements have the same /iː/ sound, a technique characteristic of Gaelic poetry of the era.

The poem is in the form of a lament for a bittern that died of thirst, but is also a tongue in cheek defence by the poet of his own drinking habit. It has been translated into English by, among others, James Stephens, Thomas MacDonagh, Thomas Kinsella, and Seamus Heaney. The Irish words have been used as lyrics by the band Clannad on their album Crann Ull (as Bunan Bui) and the English words (MacDonagh version) on Cathie Ryan's album The Music Of What Happens (1998), and also on Al O'Donnell's album "Ramble Away" (2008). Anne Brigg's song "Bonambuie", from her album Sing a Song for You, is based on the MacDonagh version, though using something close to the original Irish title.

Len Graham has also recorded a version translated by Pádraigín Ní Uallacháin which poet Paul Muldoon regarded as the closest to the original in translation and rhyming scheme and also the most singable.

The Yellow Bittern is also the name of a 1917 play about the death of Mac Giolla Ghunna by Daniel Corkery.

The version by Thomas MacDonagh is especially notable because in addition to keeping close to the original wording, MacDonagh attempts with considerable success to replicate in English the internal rhyme technique ("His bones are thrown on a naked stone / Where he lived alone like a hermit monk."), and the surreal humour of the Irish version.

A version is published in A Hidden Ulster -people, songs and traditions of Oriel (Four Courts Press) 2003 and the most recently restored variant of the air found in Oriel, with a translation is by singer Pádraigín Ní Uallacháin

== Translations ==
- Version by Thomas MacDonagh
- Version by Thomas Kinsella
- Updated version by Seamus Heaney

== Sources ==
Pádraigín Ní Uallacháin, A Hidden Ulster - people, songs and traditions of Oriel. Four Courts Press 2003.

- Robert Welch (ed.), The Oxford Companion to Irish Literature. Oxford: the Clarendon Press, 1996.
