= Forkhill Peadar Ó Doirnín GAC =

Armagh-based Gaelic games club

- Cumann Pheadar Uí Dhoirnín, Foirceal
- Founded: 1888
- County: Armagh
- Colours: Green and red
- Grounds: Pairc Peadar Ó Doirnín
- Coordinates: 54°05′04″N 6°27′23″W

Playing kits
Standard colours

Senior Club Championships
	All Ireland	Ulster champions	Armagh champions
Football:	-	-	1

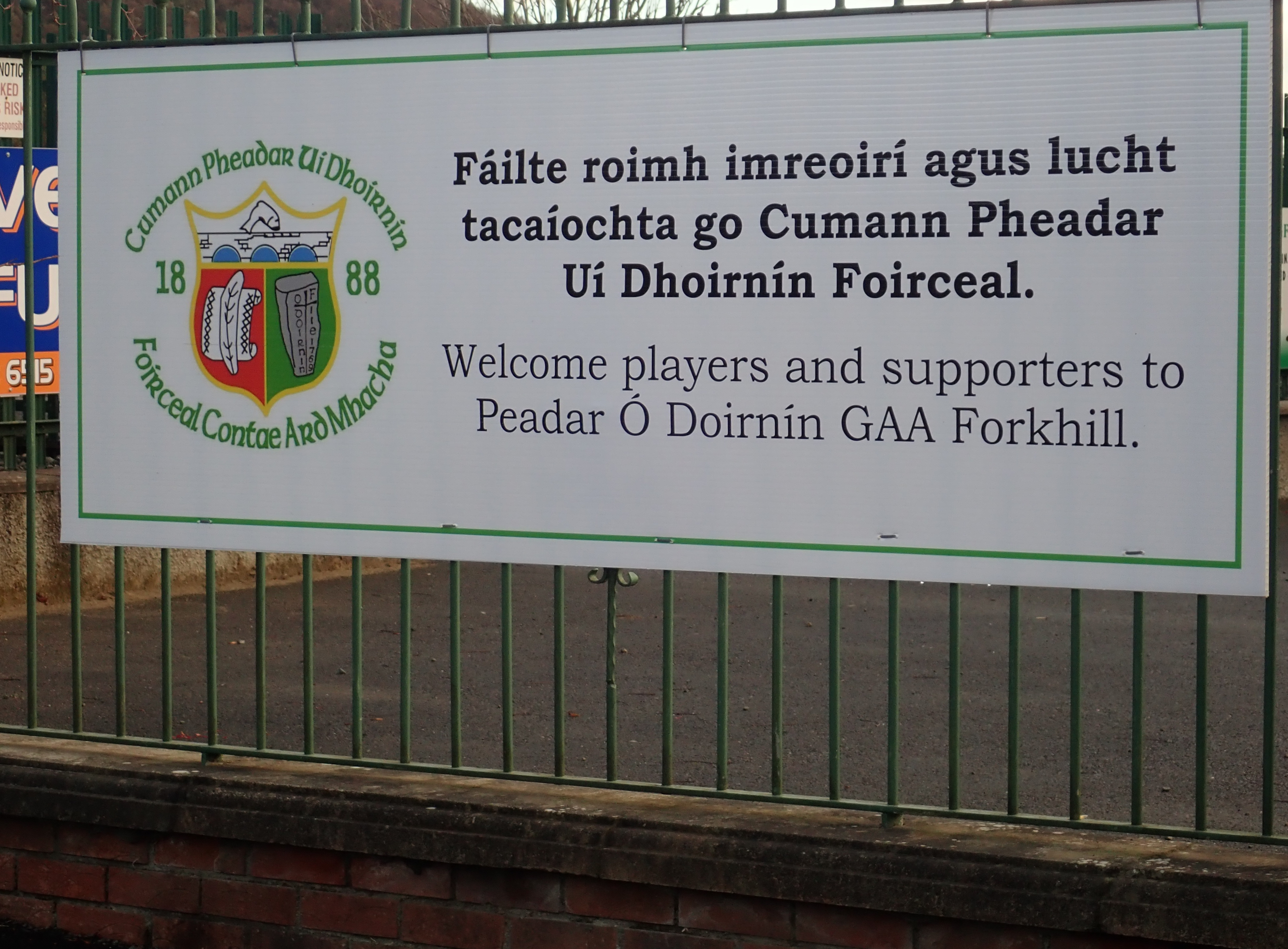
Welcome sign

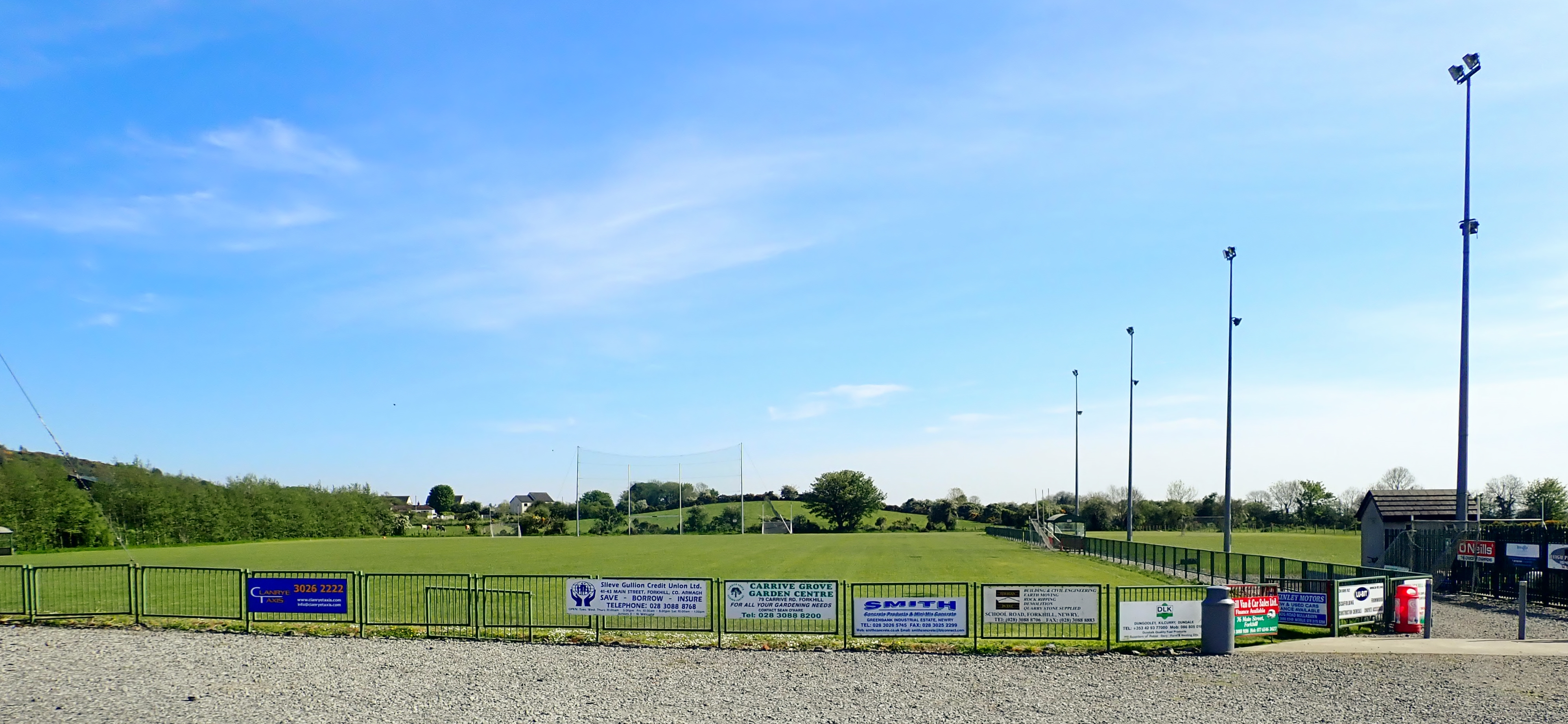
Playing fields

Forkhill Peadar Ó Doirnín Gaelic Athletic Club (Irish: CLG Peadar Ó Doirnín, Foirceal) is a Gaelic Athletic Association club within Armagh GAA. It is based in the village of Forkhill in south Armagh, Northern Ireland, on the border with County Louth, and is named in honour of the 18th-century Airgíalla poet Peadar Ó Doirnín. The club is one of the oldest in the county; having been founded in 1888, it marked its 125th anniversary in 2013.

It currently plays Gaelic football at Intermediate level.

== History ==
Four Forkhill players were members of the Armagh squad which won the All-Ireland Junior Football Championship in 1926.

Forkhill Senior men reached Division 1A for the first time in club history in 2015 and spent 2 years in Armagh club footballs top tier before relegation every year ending up in Junior league.

In the same year of 2015 Forkhill senior ladies captured the Armagh junior championship.

Forkhill witnessed partial success at underage level in 2019 with the under 14 side reaching the championship final but were defeated. The under 16 side captured division 2 league glory defeating Mullaghabawn.

In 2020 Forkhill seniors captured the junior championship defeating Bellek 3–10 to 1–10 in the final and doing so captured there first championship glory at senior level in 39 years.

=== Notable players ===
- Stephen Sheridan, Armagh county team (Armagh County Player of the Year 2017)
- Patrick Burns, Armagh county team (Armagh County Player of the Year 2018)
- Jemar Hall, Armagh county team

== Honours ==
- Armagh Senior Football Championship (1)
  - 1928
- Armagh Junior Football Championship (2)
  - 1981, 2020
