= Muckross Abbey =

Ruined friary in the Killarney National Park, Ireland

Coordinates: 52°01′34″N 9°29′44″W

- Mainistir Locha Léinand Mainistir Mhucrois
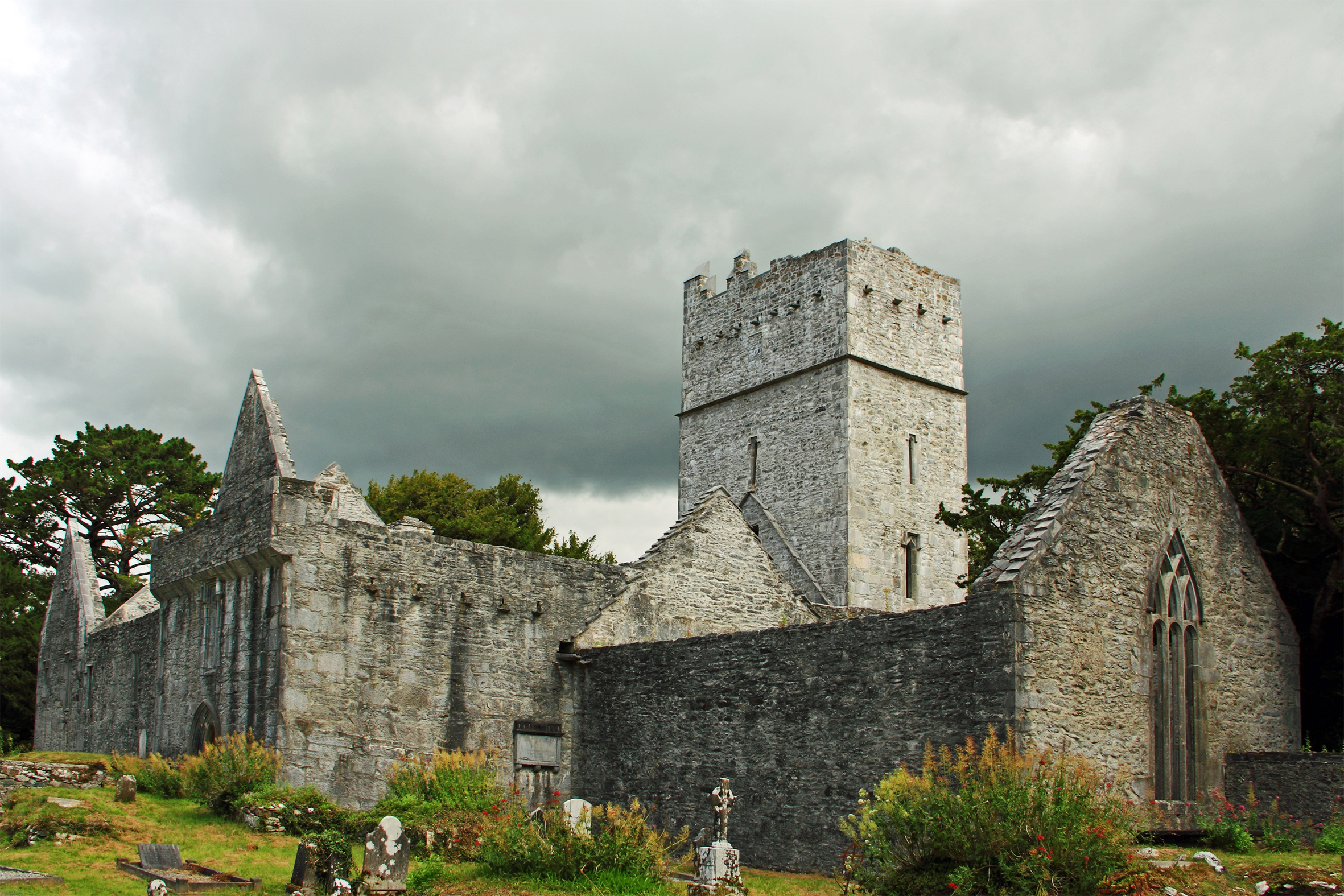
- Muckross Abbey, 2014
- Interactive map of Muckross Abbey

Monastery information
- Other name: Friary of Irrelagh
- Denomination: Franciscan
- Established: 1448

Muckross Abbey (Irish: Mainistir Locha Léinand Mainistir Mhucrois) is a ruined Franciscan friary located in the Killarney National Park, County Kerry, Ireland. Previously known as the "Friary of Irrelagh", the abbey was founded in 1448 for the Observantine Franciscans by Donal McCarthy Mor. Today the abbey is largely roofless, but retains most of its original walls.

== History ==
The friary was originally known as the "Friary of Irrelagh", the abbey was founded in 1448 for the Observantine Franciscans by Donal McCarthy Mor

During the late 16th century, the friary was attacked during the Desmond Rebellions under Elizabeth I In 1652, the friary was again targeted, this time by troops from a unit of Cromwell’s New Model Army, under the command of Edmond Ludlow. The soldiers deliberately removed the roof, leaving the friary uninhabitable. Several Franciscans were killed during the assault, while others fled abroad, primarily to France. The friary was subsequently abandoned.

Muckross Abbey served as a burial place for local chieftains and poets during the 17th and 18th centuries, including Séafraidh Ó Donnchadha, Ó Rathaille and Ó Súilleabháin. Piaras Feiritéar, executed in 1653, is buried in the burial grounds surrounding the Abbey.

== Description ==
The ruins are located on the east side of Lough Leane, approximately three miles south of Killarney.

The abbey consists of a rectangular nave and chancel, separated by a central tower, with a south transept. Adjoining the church is a cloister, around which were arranged the friary’s domestic buildings, including the dormitory, refectory, kitchen, and the prior’s residence.

The chancel is lit by a large east window. It also contains several medieval architectural features, including a piscina, a sedilia, and multiple tomb recesses set into the walls. The friary’s most striking feature is its central cloistered courtyard, which contains a large yew tree traditionally believed to be several centuries old.

== Gallery ==
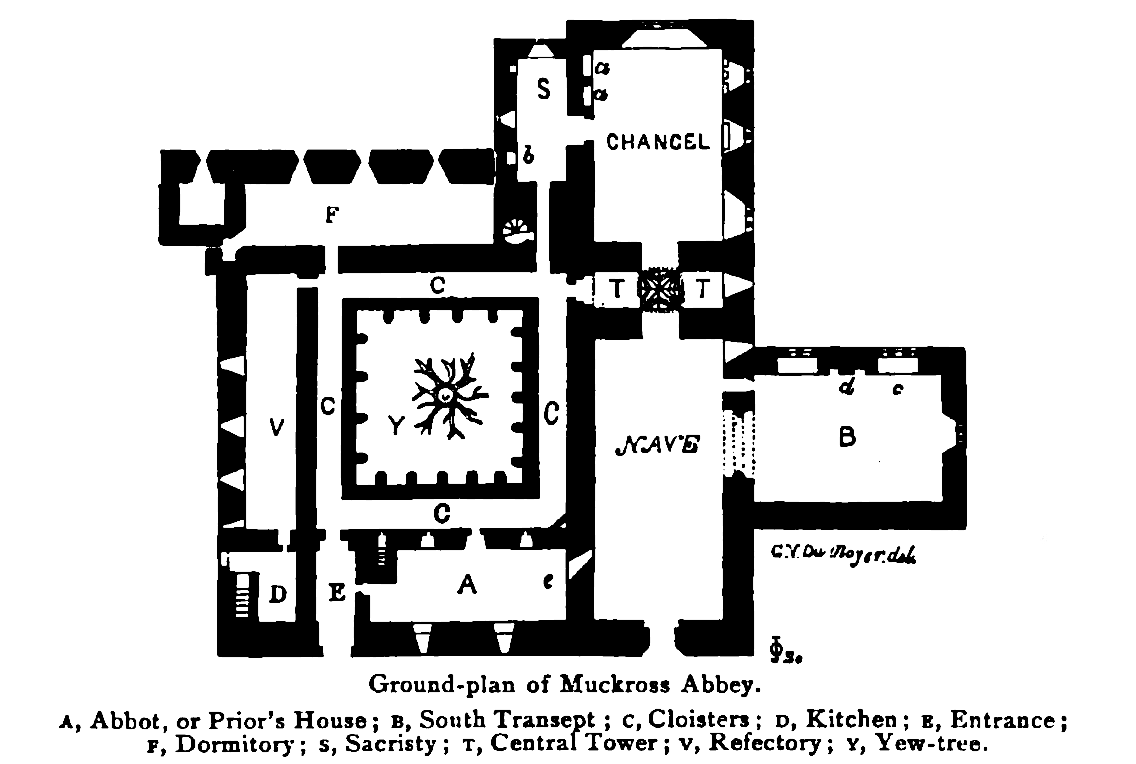
Layout of the Abbey

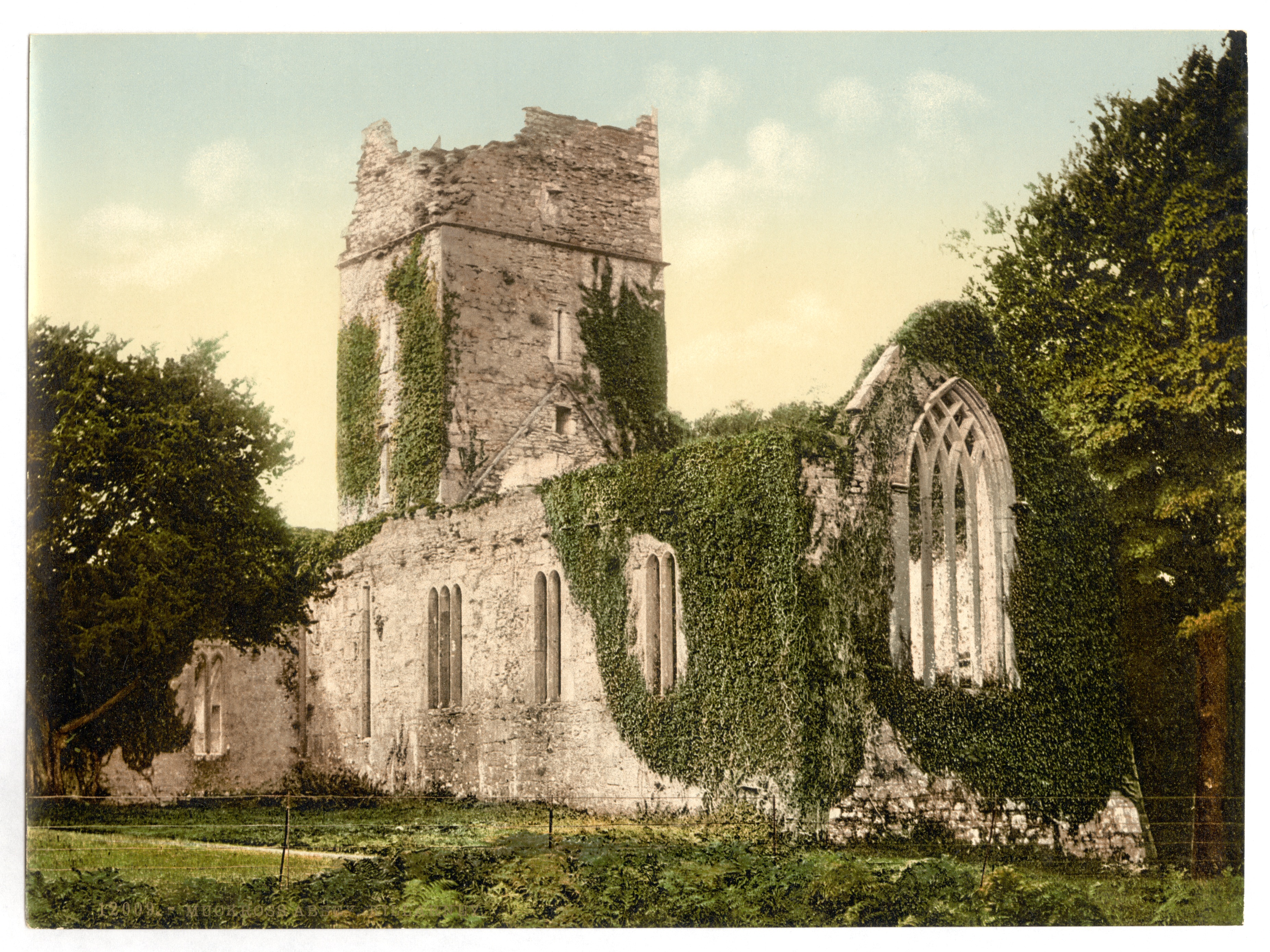
The abbey in the 1890s

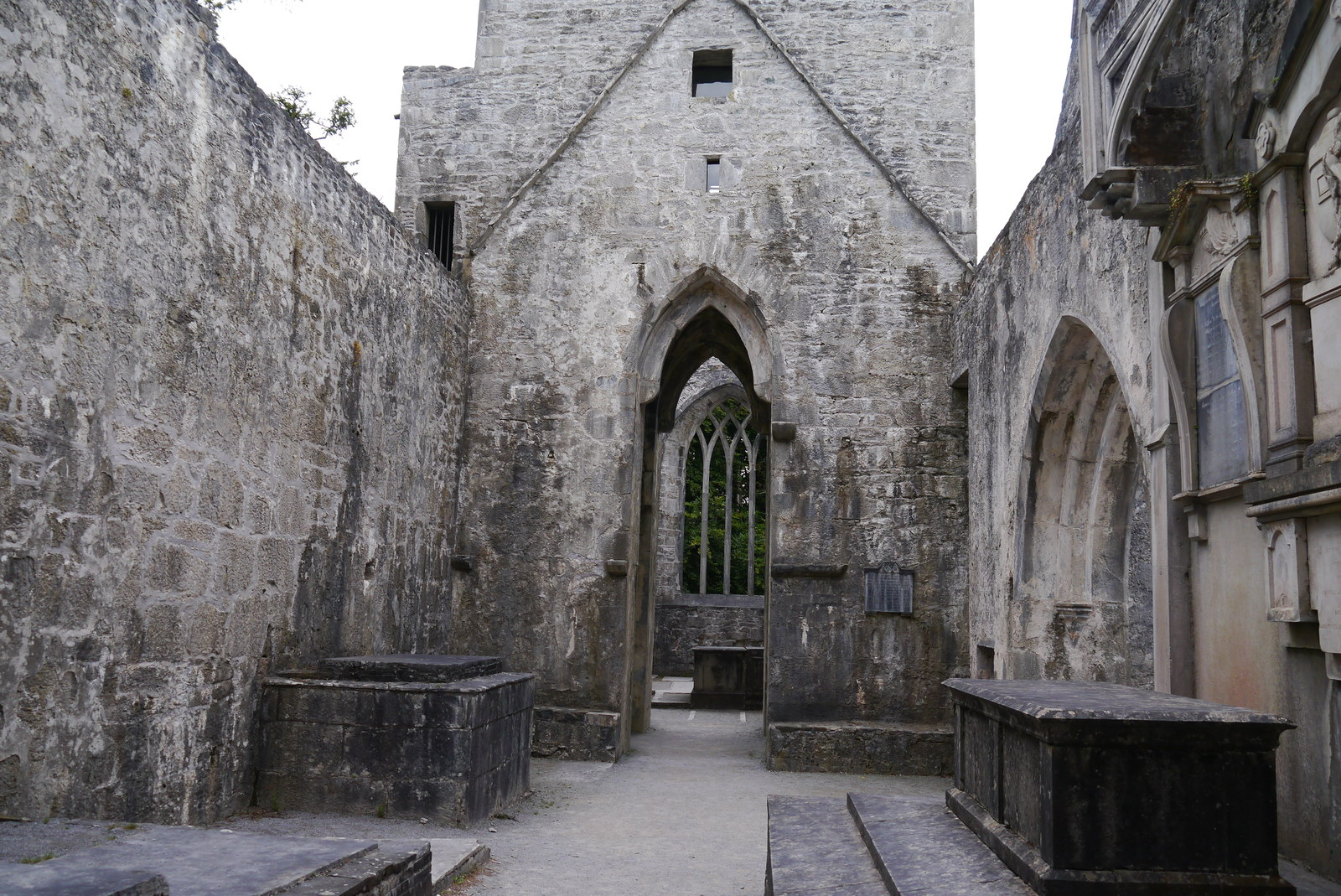
Nave interior

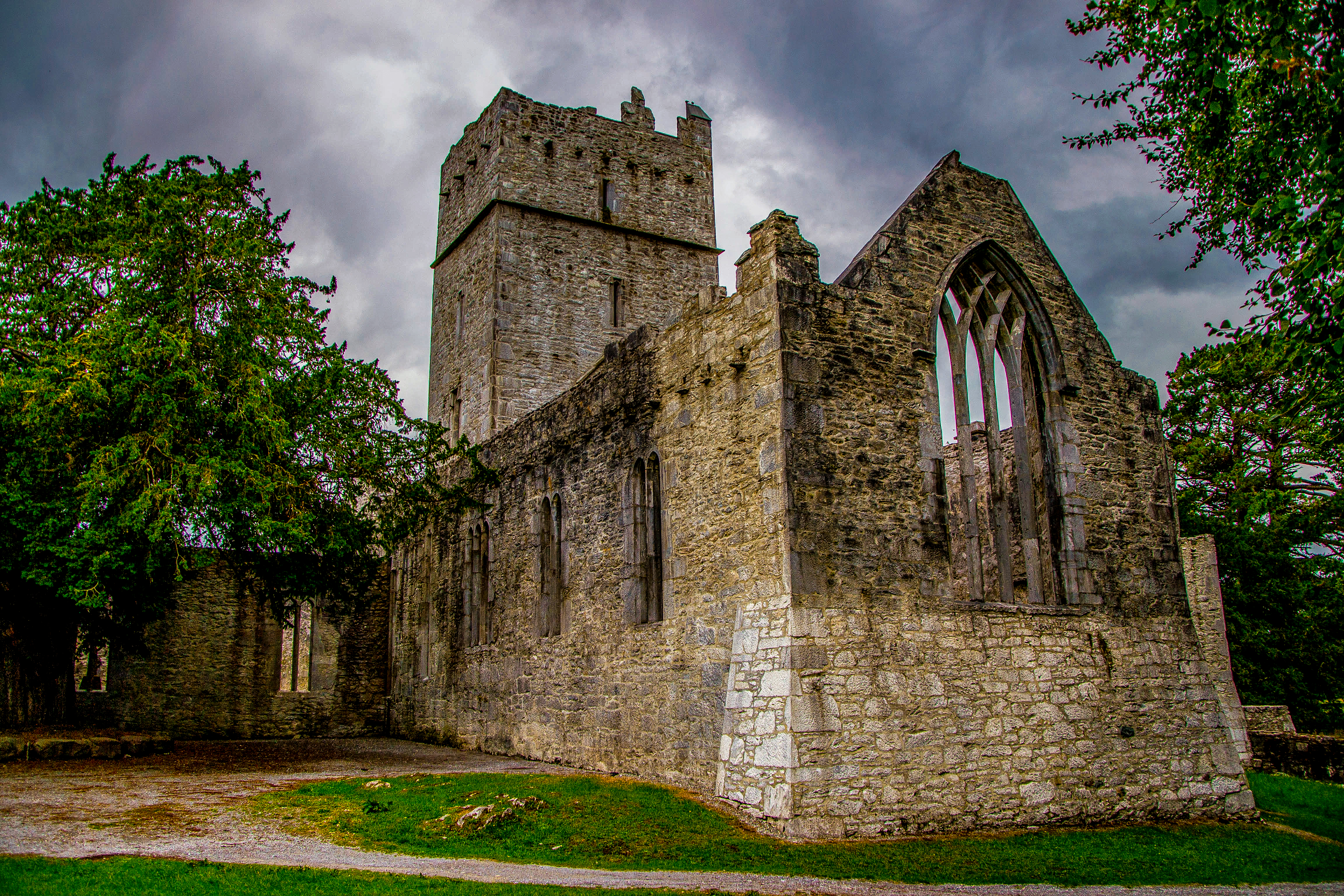
Abbey exterior view

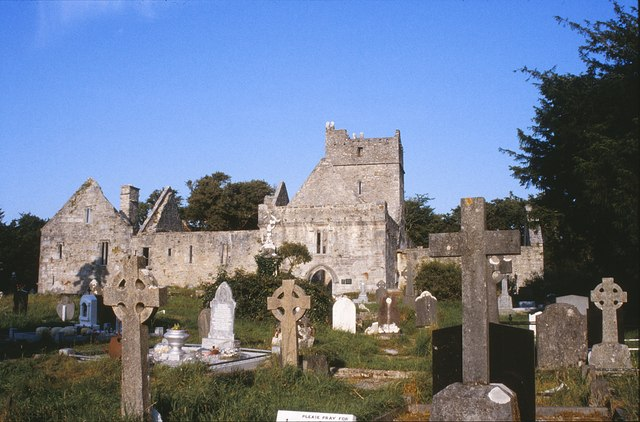
Abbey and cemetery

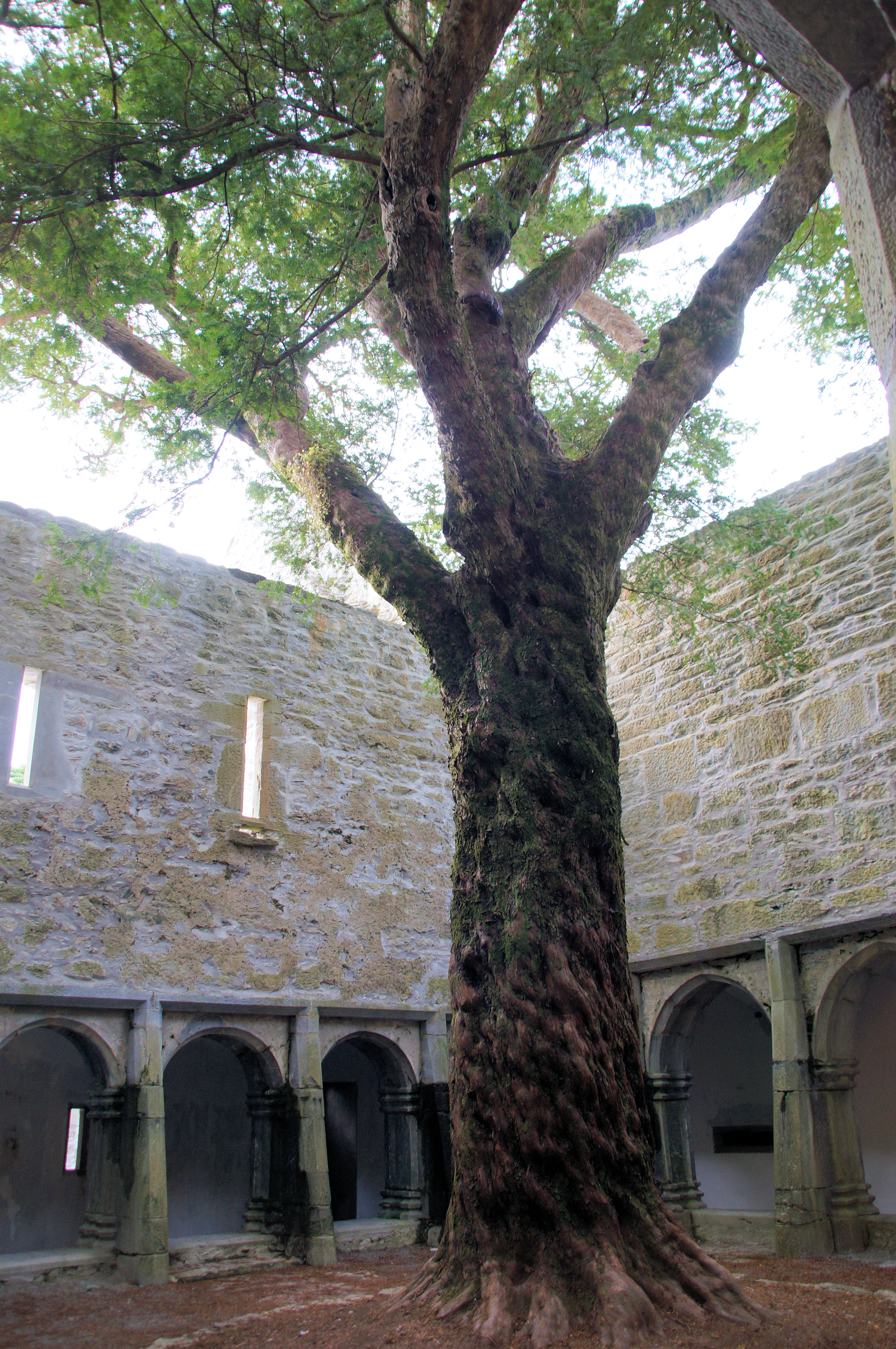
Courtyard with cloister and yew tree.

== See also ==
- Muckross House
- List of abbeys and priories in Ireland (County Kerry)
