= Aogán Ó Rathaille =

Irish poet

Aodhagán Ó Rathaille (Note: Variant Irish spellings of his name include Aogán and Ua Rathaille) or Egan O'Rahilly (c.1670–1726), was an Irish language poet. He is credited with creating the first fully developed Aisling.

== Early life ==
It is thought that Ó Rathaille was born in Scrahanaveal (Irish: Screathan an Mhíl), Gneeveguilla, in the Sliabh Luachra region of County Kerry, into a relatively prosperous family. Patrick S. Dinneen tells us that "his father died while he was still young, leaving his widow in good circumstances. She owned at one time half the townland of Scrahanaveal, which, however, under the stress of circumstances, she relinquished, and came to dwell at Cnoc an Chorrfhiaidh, also called Stagmount... Here Egan lived a long time." It may also have been here that Ó Rathaille was trained in the bardic arts. He acquired an excellent education in the bardic school of the MacEgan family (ollamhs to the Mac Cárthaigh Mór) and was taught Latin and English as well as Irish literature and history. He became a respected ollamh and travelled to the homes of the Old Irish chiefs where he was treated as an honoured guest. He also worked as a scribe.

== Later life ==
Ó Rathaille lived through a time of major political and social upheaval in Ireland which was ultimately to result in the crushing of the Irish language and the death of the bardic tradition. The changes in Irish society directly impacted Ó Rathaille's life and resulted in his social status being reduced from that of a respected ollamh to a destitute pauper. This transition was a source of huge bitterness to Aodhagán and it was this pathos that drove him to pen much of his poetry.

Aodhagán Ó Rathaille was related to the brehons to the Mac Cárthaigh Mór family (and would have seen them as his chiefs and patrons). Due to the Munster plantation, however, the Browne family (later known as Kenmare) had succeeded to the MacCarthy lands under English occupation. Unlike most of the English settlers, the Brownes soon reverted to their Catholic faith, and made matches with the leading Catholic families in Munster and Leinster—Ó Suilleabháin Mór (O'Sullivan Mor), Fitzgerald of Desmond, MacCarthys, Butlers, O'Briens, Plunketts and many others.

Sir Valentine Browne, 3rd Baronet, 1st Viscount (1638–1694) was a supporter of James II, King of England and was given the title Viscount Kenmare in the Jacobite peerage. He was the landlord and patron of Aodhagán Ó Rathaille. However, after the Treaty of Limerick in 1691, Valentine Browne was attainted for his loyalty to the House of Stuart and his property was declared forfeit to King William in 1691. His son Nicholas Browne, 4th Baronet, 2nd Viscount was also a Jacobite supporter and attainted and could not claim the estates. Nicholas Browne's children were still to inherit, so the commissioners of the estate were instructed not to let the estate out for more than 21 years. However, it was let to John Blennerhasset and George Rogers (two members of parliament) for a contract of 61 years. Blennerhasset and Rogers claimed they planned to plant the estate with Protestants when their illegal contract was questioned by the English Commission in 1699.

The contract was quashed, and in 1703 the estate was sold to John Asgill, who had married a daughter of Nicholas Browne. Under his management, two ruthless and greed-driven men, Timothy Cronin and Murtagh Griffin, collected the hearth money tax from tenants and felled the woods for quick profit. Aodhagán composed a vitriolic mock-eulogy upon the death of Griffin, and another in "honour" of Cronin. It is likely that as a consequence of the loss of the estate by the Brownes, Ó Rathaille had to leave his native district and lived in poverty close by Tonn Tóime, at the edge of Castlemaine Harbour, some 12 miles west of Killarney.

On the death of Nicholas Browne in 1720, the Kenmare estates were again placed under the ownership of a Browne – Nicholas' son Valentine (5th Baronent, 3rd Viscount). Having been destitute for so long (even composing a poem on his gratitude at receiving the gift of a pair of shoes) Ó Rathaille clearly hoped for a restoration of his position as ollamh, and celebrated Valentine's marriage to Honora Butler in 1720 in an Epithalamium.

However, society had changed vastly in the intervening time; also, the estates had suffered under the mismanagement of John Asgill and were taking a severely reduced income. Valentine Browne either could not or would not restore Ó Rathaille's position. It seems that the refusal of this request was sufficiently devastating for Ó Rathaille to compose the poem in which he launches a vitriolic attack on the new English gentry like Valentine Browne and makes reference to the failure of the Jacobites as being a primary cause for his own situation.

Little historical biographical reference has been found concerning Ó Rathaille's personal circumstances during his life, and the above details are mostly based on a literal interpretation of his surviving poems. Breandán Ó Buachalla warns against putting too much stock in literal interpretation of the poems, especially regarding his final poem, written on his deathbed.

== Legacy ==
Aodhagán Ó Rathaille is credited with creating the first fully developed Aisling poem (a type of coded poem where Ireland is portrayed as a beautiful woman who bewails the current state of affairs and predicts an imminent revival of fortune, usually linked to the return of a Stuart King to the English throne). This style of poetry became a standard in Ireland, where it was dangerous to speak overtly of politics, but a poem disguised as a love song could reveal the singer's and listeners' true feelings. His best-known and most popular poem is the great aisling Gile na Gile (Brightness Most Bright), which has been called one of the miracles of Irish literature.

Dinneen's work on Ó Rathaille, published in 1900, was the first published scholarly edition of the complete works of any of the Irish poets. In 1924, Daniel Corkery devoted a chapter of his groundbreaking book The Hidden Ireland to Ó Rathaille.

The final poem composed by Ó Rathaille on his deathbed is one of the finest of Irish literature and the ultimate expression of the rage and loss that Ó Rathaille had been presenting in poetry during most of his life. William Butler Yeats later made reference to this work in his poem The Curse of Cromwell. Ó Rathaille's life can be seen as a microcosm of the changes in culture and society which occurred in Ireland during the end of the 17th century. His loss of status and resultant destitution are direct parallels to the death of the bardic tradition and the subsequent near-extinction of the Irish language.

Ó Rathaille is buried in Muckross Abbey near Killarney in County Kerry.

== In popular culture ==
Poet Seamus Heaney and piper Liam O'Flynn perform Gile na Gile on the album The Poet and the Piper.

A traditional slow air called Ó Rathaille's Grave is performed by Matt Molloy on the album Stony Steps. It has also been recorded by Denis Murphy and Julia Clifford on the album The Star Above the Garter and by Joe Burke on the album The Tailor's Choice.

In 2023, Marcella O’Connor directed a short documentary titled Brightness of Brightness. It featured actor John Kelly as Ó Rathaille and was narrated by Sarah Tully.

In January 2025 Eile Press published Wave: Poems of Aogán Ó Rathaille - 18 poems translated by Brian O'Connor, with a foreword by Declan Kiberd.

== See also ==
- Piaras Feiritéar
- Dáibhí Ó Bruadair
- Cathal Buí Mac Giolla Ghunna
- Peadar Ó Doirnín
- Séamas Dall Mac Cuarta
- Art Mac Cumhaigh
- Brian Mac Giolla Phádraig
- Seán Clárach Mac Dónaill
- Eoghan Rua Ó Súilleabháin
