= Seán "Clárach" Mac Domhnaill =

Irish poet (1691-1754)

- Born: 1691; Churchtown, County Cork, Ireland
- Died: 1754 (aged 62–63); Charleville, County Cork, Ireland
- Occupation: Poet
- Writing career
- Notable work: Mo Ghile Mear
- Literary movement: The Maigue Poets

Seán "Clárach" Mac Domhnaill (modern spelling Seán Clárach Mac Dónaill, anglicized John Mac Donnell Claragh; 1691–1754) was an Irish language poet in the first half of the 18th century.

== Early life ==
Seán Clárach Mac Domhnaill was born in 1691 in Churchtown, County Cork and lived all of his adult life at Kiltoohig (Cill Tuathaigh), a townland in the Electoral Division of Rathluirc (Charleville, County Cork) in the Civil Parish of Ballyhay, within the Barony of Orrery and Kilmore. Little or nothing is reliably recorded about his youth or family, but it is known that, despite the penal laws in force in Ireland, he received a comprehensive education, either in the home or in a hedge school, but most likely in both. He was proficient in Latin, Ancient Greek and English literature as well as in his native Irish language.

== Career ==
Mac Domhnaill was convenor of the "Maigue Poets" (Filí na Máigh, refer to the basin of the River Maigue), a circle of 18th century Gaelic poets based in County Limerick and the adjacent borders of County Cork during the middle decades of the 1700s. Under his chairmanship, they sometimes met in the ancient ringfort of Lios Ollium, in Bruree. His own house near Ráth Luirc Charleville was a frequent meeting place, as were the homes of the others in the group. In Croom, County Limerick, he frequented the tig táirne public house of Seán Ó Tuama, a good friend and another Maigue poet. Nicknamed "Clárach" (one with a wide face), Mac Domhnaill was highly respected by his peers, even though his output was insignificant. His fellow Munster poets gave him the title Príomh-Éigeas na Mumhan (Chief Poet of Munster). Mac Domhnaill was unable to sustain a living entirely from poetry, as others did, but was obliged to supplement his income by farm labouring and teaching from time to time.

His song Mo Ghile Mear has been recorded by Sting with the Chieftains, Mary Black and sean-nós singer songwriter Sibéal.

== Death ==
Mac Domhnaill died in 1754 and buried in Holy Cross Cemetery, Charleville in the centre of the graveyard, on the site of the medieval parish church.

== Works ==
Mo Ghile Mear is Mac Domhnaill's best known work. It is a lament or caoineadh written after the defeat of the Bonnie Prince Charles at the Battle of Culloden, in 1746. The Irish poets had pinned their hopes on Charles, and his flight was a crushing blow to the long-suffering Gaels of both Ireland and Scotland. Their exasperation and despair is vividly portrayed in this poem. Like all other Gaelic poems of the time, Mo Ghile Mear would have been sung rather than recited; indeed, the melody is well-known today. This is the chorus:

'Sé mo laoch, mo ghile mear,
'Sé mo Shaesar, gile mear;
Ní bhfuaireas féin aon tsuan ná séan
Ó chuaigh i gcéin mo ghile mear.

— Mo Ghile Mear by Seán "Clárach" Mac Dónaill

In 1723, on the death of Philippe II, Duke of Orléans, Mac Domhnaill wrote a poem reproaching him for his indifference towards Ireland. His other works include: De Bharr na gCnoc and Gráinne Mhaol.

== Poetic style ==
While not a true bardic poet like Dáibhí Ó Bruadair, Mac Domhnaill adhered to the complex rhyming methodology of the bards. His language could be ornate but not as flowery as the Classical Irish of the bardic schools. By the 18th century, this cloyingly ornate language had been abandoned in favour of modern dialect. The highly embellished language fell into disuse after the strict bardic schools closed down and a literary standard became impossible to maintain evenly across the country.

== See also ==
- Aogán Ó Rathaille
- Piaras Feiritéar
- Cathal Buí Mac Giolla Ghunna
- Peadar Ó Doirnín
- Séamas Dall Mac Cuarta
- Art Mac Cumhaigh
- Brian Mac Giolla Phádraig
- Eoghan Rua Ó Súilleabháin
