= Murcha Crúis =

Murcha Crúis, Irish Jacobite, fl. 1688–1691?

== Biography ==
Murcha Crúis was a Jacobite soldier praised and lamented in the poem, Tuireamh Mhurcha Crúis by Séamas Dall Mac Cuarta. Cruise (originally de Cruys) or de Crúis, were an Anglo-Norman who settled in County Meath and County Dublin in the aftermath of the 1169–1171 arrival of the Normans in Ireland.

Bridget Cruise, for whom Turlough Carolan composed four airs, was of this family, but it is unknown of what relationship. Mac Cuarta knew both Murcha Crúis and Carolan.
