= Patrick S. Dinneen =

Irish lexicographer and historian

Father Patrick Dinneen S.J.
- Pádraig Ua Duinnín
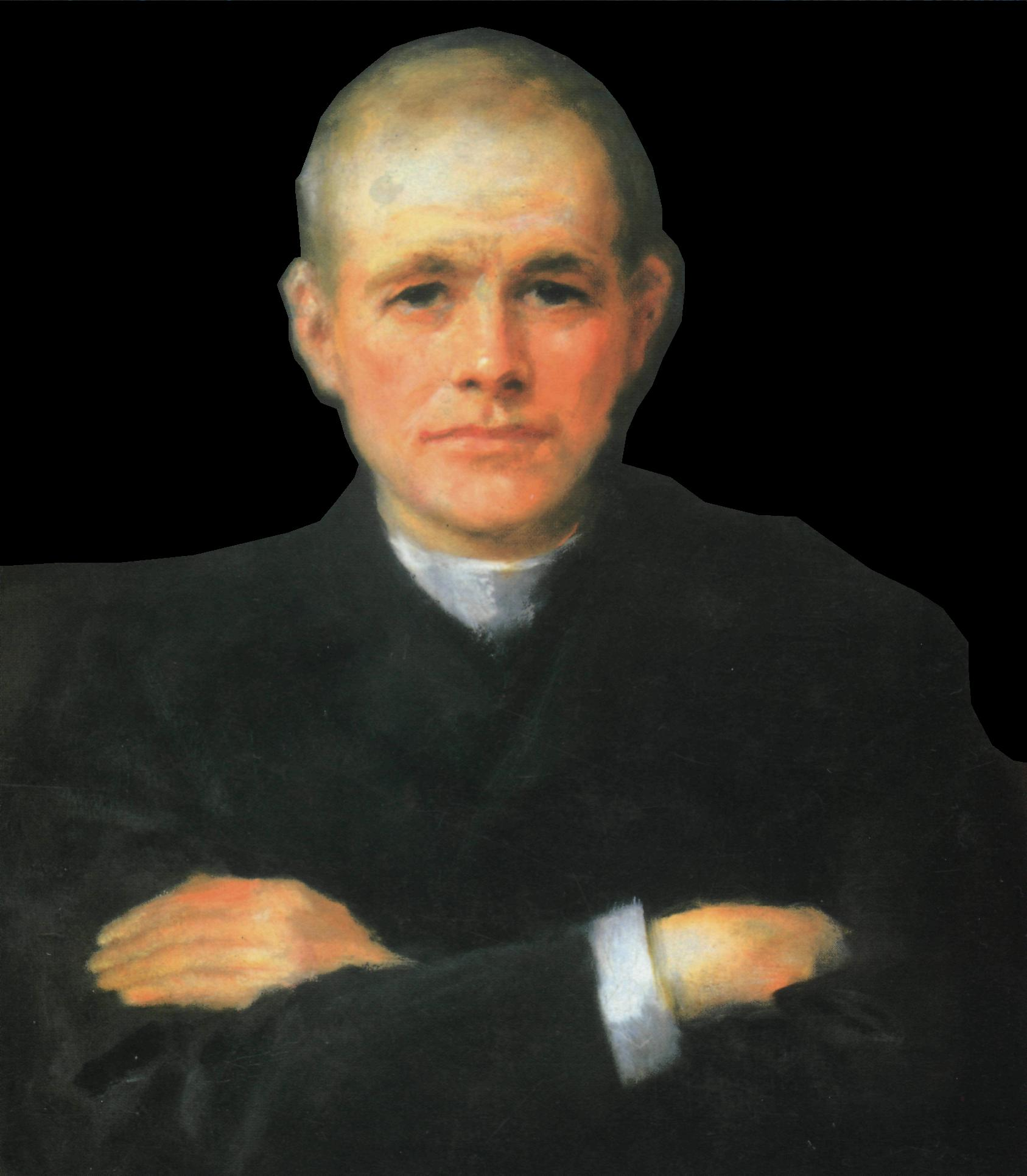
- Portrait by John Butler Yeats
- Born: 25 December 1860; Rathmore, County Kerry, Ireland
- Died: 29 September 1934 (aged 73); Dublin, Ireland
- Resting place: Glasnevin Cemetery, Dublin
- Education: Royal University of Ireland
- Occupations: Lexicographer, historian, Catholic priest, teacher, author, columnist
- Writing career
- Language: Irish
- Movement: Gaelic revival

Fr. Patrick Stephen Dinneen (Irish: Pádraig Séamus Ua Duinnín; 25 December 1860 – 29 September 1934) was an Irish lexicographer and historian, and a leading figure in the Gaelic revival.

== Life ==
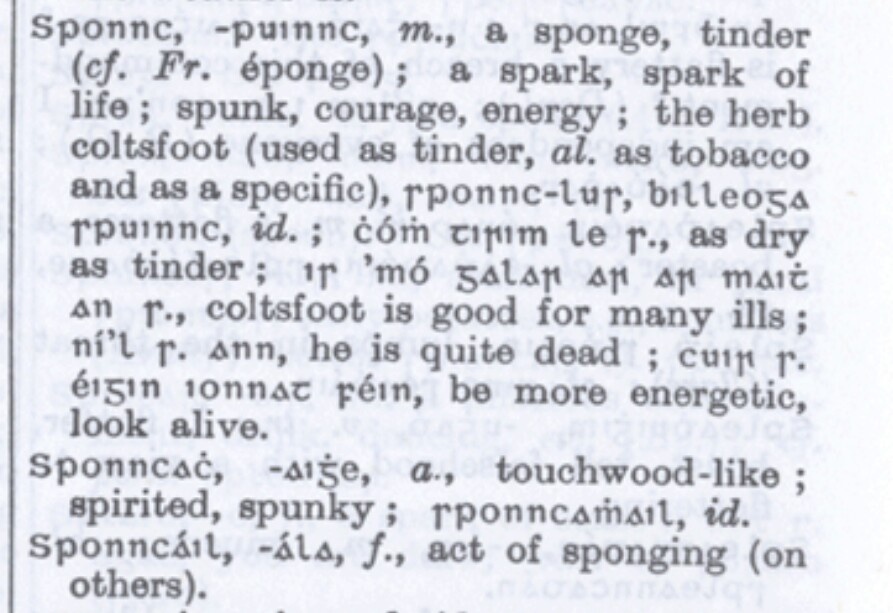
Sample entry for sponnc in Dinneen's dictionary.

Dinneen was born near Rathmore, County Kerry. He was educated at Shrone and Meentogues National Schools and at St. Brendan's College in Killarney. He earned second class honours bachelor's and master's degrees from the Royal University of Ireland. The BA (1885) was in classics and mathematical science, the MA (1889) was in mathematical science. He joined the Society of Jesus in 1880 and was ordained a priest in 1894, but left the order in 1900 to devote his life to the study of the Irish language while still remaining a priest. After his ordination, he taught Irish, English, classics, and mathematics in three different Jesuit colleges, including Clongowes Wood College, a Jesuit boarding school near Clane, County Kildare.

P. S. Dinneen's dictionary Foclóir Gaedhilge agus Béarla, 1904

He was a leading figure in the Irish Texts Society, publishing editions of Geoffrey Keating's Foras Feasa ar Éirinn, poems by Aogán Ó Rathaille, Piaras Feiritéar, Tadhg Gaelach Ó Súilleabháin, and other poets. He also wrote a novel and a play in Irish, and translated such works as Charles Dickens's A Christmas Carol into Irish. His best known work, however, is his Irish–English dictionary, Foclóir Gaedhilge agus Béarla, which was first published in 1904. The stock and plates of the dictionary were destroyed during the Easter Rising of 1916, so Dinneen took the opportunity to expand the dictionary. A much larger second edition, compiled with the assistance of Liam S. Gógan, was published in 1927. Dinneen's request to the Irish Texts Society to include Gogan's name on the title page was refused. Gogan continued to work on the collection of words up to his death in 1979. This complementary dictionary was published online in 2011.

Fr. Dinneen died in Dublin at the age of 73 and is buried in Glasnevin Cemetery, Dublin.

== Bibliography ==
Works of Fr. Patrick S. Dinneen
Title	Publication	Type
Poems of Aodhagán Ó Rathaille	Irish Texts Society, 1900	Poetry
Poems of Eogan Rua Ó Suilleabháin	Irish Texts Society, 1901	Poetry
Foras Feasa ar Éirinn	Irish Texts Society, 1902	History
Foclóir Gaedhilge Agus Béarla	Irish Texts Society, 1904	Irish-English Dictionary
Me Guidhir Fhearmanach	Irish Texts Society, 1917	Translation
The Queen of the Hearth	Irish Texts Society,	Classics Of Irish History
Irish Prose: An Essay In Irish	Irish Texts Society, 1923	Irish language
Aistí ar Litriḋeaċt Ġréigise is Laidne	Oifig an tSoláṫair, 1929	Essays on Greek and Roman classics
Comhairle Fithil: Urchluiche Dhá Ghníomh	N/A	N/A
An Tobar Draoidheachta: Dráma Leis an Athair Pádraig Ua Duinnín	N/A	Play
Lectures on the Irish Language Movement Delivered Under the Auspices of Various Branches of the Gaelic League	N/A	Collection of Lectures

== See also ==
- Dinneen
