= Piaras Feiritéar =

17th century Irish poet

Piaras Feiritéar (Irish pronunciation: [ˈpʲiəɾˠəsˠ fʲɛɾʲəˈtʲeːɾˠ]; 1600 – 1653), or Pierce Ferriter, was an Irish clan Chief, and poet. Although best known for his many works of Bardic poetry in the Irish language, Feiritéar is also a widely revered folk hero in the Dingle Peninsula for his role as a leader of the nascent Irish Confederacy, which led to his 1653 summary execution at Killarney for resisting the Cromwellian conquest of Ireland.

== Early life ==
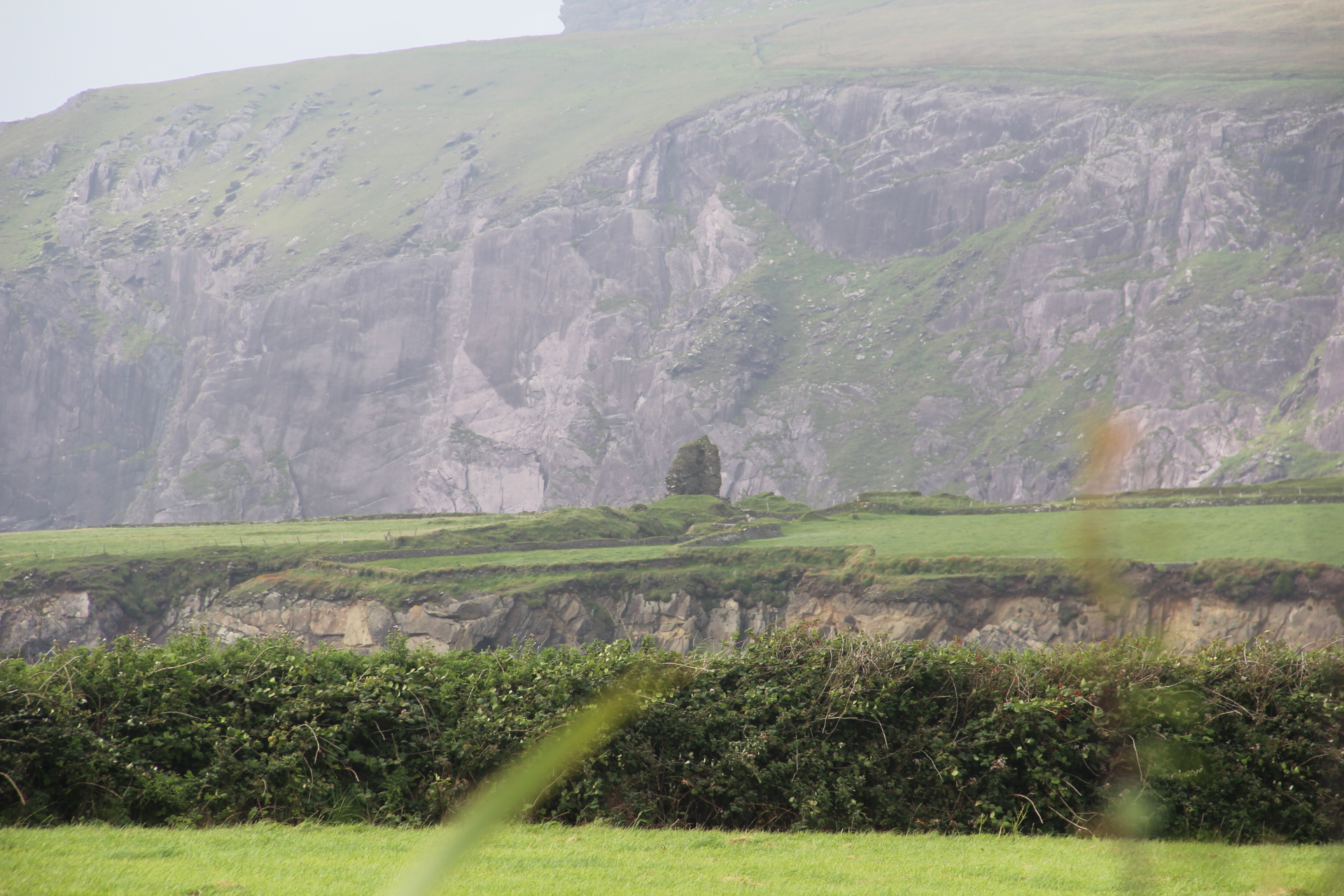
The ruins of Castle Sybil at Ferriter's Cove, where Piaras Feiritéar was born.

Feiritéar was the last Chief of the Name of the completely Gaelicized Norman Clan Feiritéar and Lord of Ballyferriter in Corca Dhuibhne.

Feiritéar was a harpist as well as an extremely sophisticated multilingual poet in the Irish language. He was known for his blend of laments, eulogies and satires in the Bardic tradition and for composing love poetry with much wider European influences. His best known work, Leig díot t’airm, a mhacoimh mná ("Lay aside thy arms, maiden"), is a poem about a beautiful woman. It is believed that he may have written poetry in English, but none of this has survived. Some critics have argued that his Irish poetry shows the influence of the English Elizabethans.

== Warrior ==
A leader during the Confederate Ireland wars, Feiritéar was wounded during an attack by Oliver Cromwell's Roundheads on Clan Feiritéar's stronghold of Tralee Castle in 1641. Feiritéar and his Clansmen held the castle until the fall of Ross Castle in Killarney to the Cromwellians in June 1653. Granted safe passage by Cromwellian commander Brigadier Nelson, Feiritéar travelled to arrange surrender terms. Instead, he was seized at Castlemaine and hanged alongside others, including his brother-in-law, Dominican friar Tadhg Ó Muircheartaigh, on Cnocán na gCaorach in Killarney on 15 October 1653.

== Legacy ==
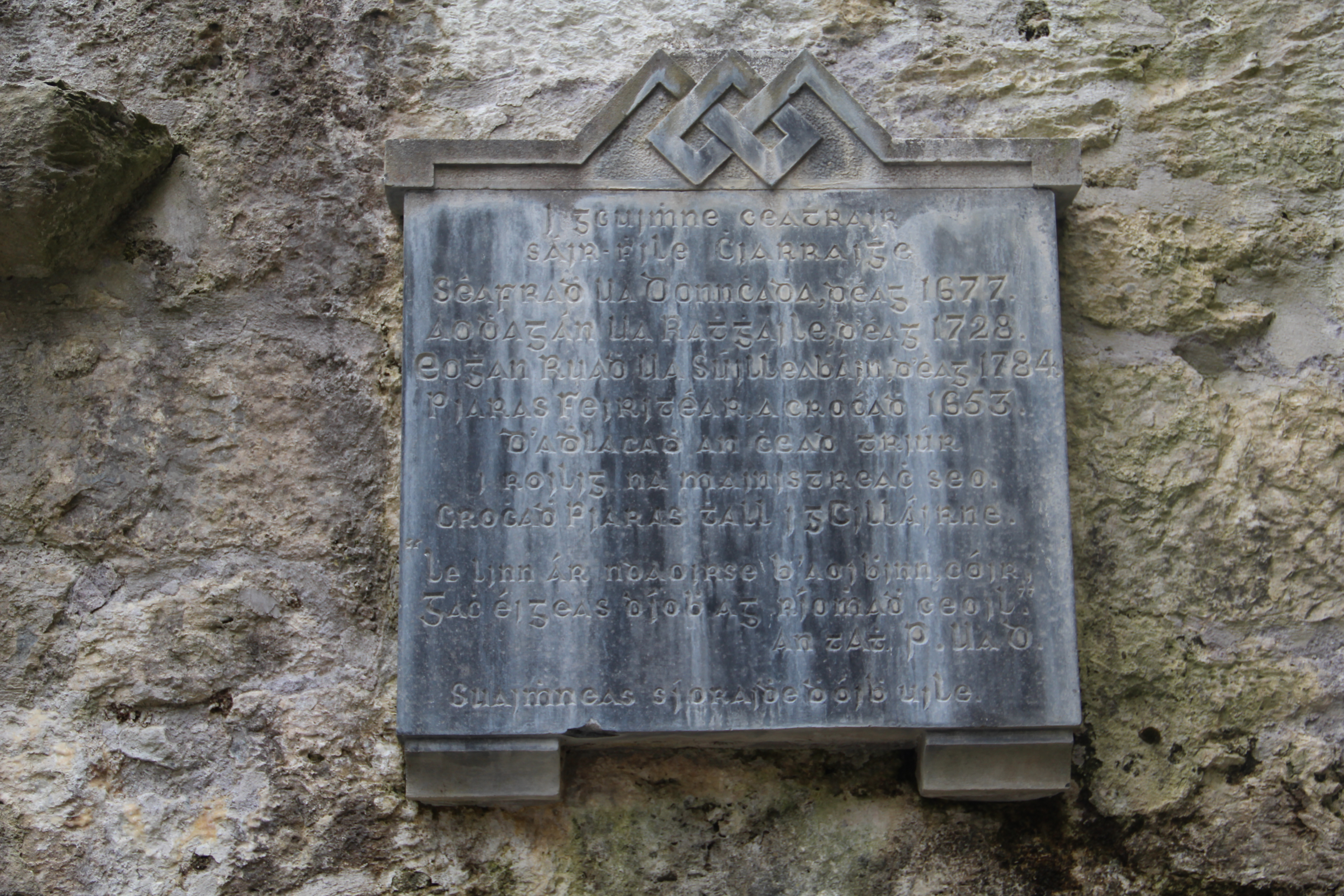
Memorial to the "Four Kerry Poets" (Piaras Feiritéar, Seafradh Ó Donnchadha, Aogán Ó Rathaille, and Eoghan Rua Ó Súilleabháin) in Muckross Abbey, Killarney.

Piaras Feiritéar remains a folk hero for the Irish-speaking people of the Dingle Peninsula, particularly in his native Ard na Caithne, where the ruins of his family's castle can still be seen, and his poetry still lives as the oral literature.

Writing in 1926, Daniel Corkery revealed that Piaras Feiritéar's 1653 execution helped give birth to the Aisling tradition within Irish poetry, in which a spéirbhean (a beautiful and queenly woman from the Otherworld, symbolizing Ireland) laments her state and, in later versions, prophesies a better future. In 1653, an anonymous County Kerry Bard composed a lament in verse over Feiritéar's death. The lament, which begins, Do chonnac aisling are maidin an lar ghil ("I saw a vision on the morning of the bright day"). The vision was the Pre-Christian goddess Erin bewailing the death of a man who had overthrown hundreds.

In The Western Island Robin Flower relates a story told by Seanchai Tomás Ó Criomhthain, who alleged that Piaras had a stronghold upon Great Blasket Island that he used to evade the English.

In 1934, Pádraig Ó Duinnín edited a book entitled Dánta Phiarais Feiritéir: maille le réamh-rádh agus nótaí which contained 23 of Piaras's surviving poems. In the book, Ó Duinnín devotes a chapter to the influence of Feiritéar's poetry and life on the folklore of the area.

In 2001, Munster Irish poet and writer Máire Mhac an tSaoi published an award-winning novel A Bhean Óg Ón... about the relationship between Piaras and Meg Russell, for whom he wrote much of his love poetry in the Irish language.

There is a memorial to Piaras Feiritéar and three other Kerry poets from the Early Modern period, Séafraidh Ó Donnchadha an Ghleanna, Aodhagan Ó Rathaille and Eoghan Rua Ó Súilleabháin in the form of a sculpture of a spéirbhean (a dream woman, symbol of Ireland) with the names of all four poets carved into it in Killarney town.

== See also ==
- Aogán Ó Rathaille
- Dáibhí Ó Bruadair
- Cathal Buí Mac Giolla Ghunna
- Peadar Ó Doirnín
- Séamas Dall Mac Cuarta
- Art Mac Cumhaigh
- Seán Clárach Mac Domhnaill
- Eoghan Rua Ó Súilleabháin
