= Owen Red Hanrahan =

Fictional character created by William Butler Yeats

Owen Red Hanrahan is a fictional character who appears in several works by William Butler Yeats.

Yeats based the character largely on the real-life bard Owen Roe O'Sullivan (Eoghan Ruadh Ó Súilleabháin). In his first appearances, in fact, Hanrahan's name is O'Sullivan the Red, with Yeats later altering the name to Hanrahan the Red and ultimately Owen "Red" Hanrahan and making him more of an amalgam of the bardic tradition and a heavily folkloric character. Hanrahan first appears in Yeats' work in the mid-1890s as the author of various poems and songs. He is the central figure of a half-dozen short stories, collectively titled Stories of Red Hanrahan, published in book form in 1897.

In the first of these short stories, Hanrahan is described at the outset as "the hedge schoolmaster, a tall, strong, red-haired young man," who first appears as he enters a "barn where some of the men of the village were sitting on Samhain Eve." This description identifies Hanrahan with Irish folklore in several ways; schoolmasters were often nationalistic poets; red-headed men often possess magical powers; and supernatural occurrences often take place on Samhain. In later stories, Hanrahan, in his wandering, is confounded both by women and by several supernatural experiences.

== See also ==
- Gayatri Chakravorty Spivak, "Principles of the Mind": Continuity in Yeats's Poetry," MLN, Vol. 83, No. 6, Comparative Literature (Dec., 1968), pp. 882-899
