= Creggan, County Armagh =

Village in County Armagh, Northern Ireland

Coordinates: 54°05′04″N 6°34′30″W

Creggan (from Irish an Creagán) is a small village, townland and civil parish near Crossmaglen in County Armagh, Northern Ireland. In the 2001 Census it had a population of 246 people. It lies within the Newry and Mourne District Council area.

== Places of interest ==
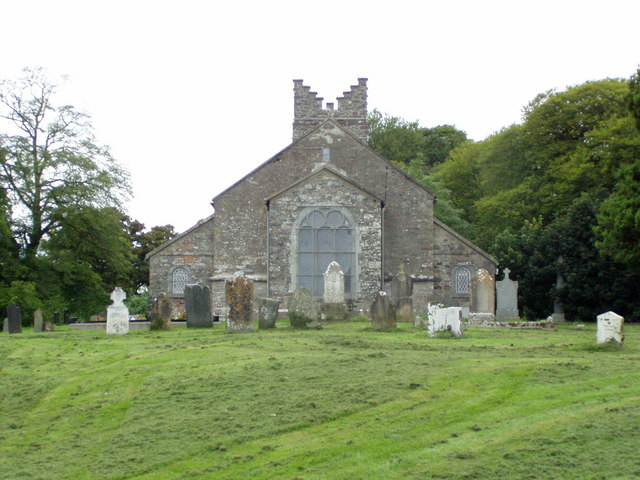
Creggan Church of Ireland

Creggan Church Yard, near Crossmaglen is home to some of Ireland's best known Gaelic poets. The current Church of Ireland church dates back to 1731 but there is evidence to suggest an earlier Catholic church preceded it. This is the burial place of three 18th-century Irish poets: Art Mac Cumhaigh, Pádraig Mac Aliondain and Séamus Mór MacMurphy. It is also the burial place of the clan O’Neill. The O’Neills of Tyrone attempted to retake South Armagh from the invading English during the middle of the 15th century. The burial place was re-discovered in 1971 during a cleanup of the cemetery for the proposed bi-centennial celebrations of Art MacCooey. It is reputed the O’Neills arrived in Creggan in 1447 and the burial place currently contains approximately 70 skulls.

On the banks of the River Creggan overlooking the rolling green hills of South Armagh stands Church of Ireland Creggan Church and graveyard. This is now a listed historical building and the grounds are surrounded by an ancient stone wall: her old gravestones stand in stark contrast to the small cluster of modern houses just beyond those walls. According to local folklore Creggan dates back to the 14th century. A congregation of mourners nearby were lowering their deceased loved one into the ground at Killyloughrain when they heard a distant tolling bell. This was read as a sign from God and they followed to the source of the ringing. It was here they buried their dead and that place, Creggan, became hallowed and the site of their Church. The present Church is believed to have been built in 1758 with the tower being added in 1799. The building itself might incorporate part of an earlier pre-schism Church. The O’Neill Vault is believed to have been situated under the altar of the latter. Now the vault lies outside the present Church building. The most famed of recent rectors was the Rev Mervyn Kingston.

== History ==
On 10 April 1921, during the Irish War of Independence, the Irish Republican Army (IRA) ambushed a five-man Royal Irish Constabulary (RIC) patrol in Creggan. The RIC men were called to investigate unusual activity at a public house, but were attacked by a fifteen-strong IRA unit. One RIC man was killed and two wounded.

Creggan, along with the rest of South Armagh, would have been transferred to the Irish Free State had the recommendations of the Irish Boundary Commission been enacted in 1925.

=== The Troubles ===
Brendan Burns (30) and Brendan Moley (30), both Catholic members of the Provisional Irish Republican Army, were killed in a premature explosion while loading a bomb into a van on 29 February 1988.

== See also ==
- List of civil parishes of County Armagh

== Links ==
- NI Neighbourhood Information System
- Enjoy Ireland
- Culture Northern Ireland
