= Seamus McMurphy =

Irish poet and rapparee

Seamus McMurphy (Irish: Séamus Mór Mac Murchaidh) was an Irish poet and rapparee, who lived c. 1720–1750.

== Early life ==
He was born at Carnally, Creggan parish, near Crossmaglen, in County Armagh about 1720. His father's name is unknown although his mother was Aine. A grandfather was said to have been killed at the Battle of Aughrim in 1691 (see Diarmuid Mac Muireadhaigh). McMurphy had four sisters; one of whom, Aillidh, was married to Mr. Duffy, a nephew of the poet Niall McMurphy (Niall Óge Mac Murchadha) to whom he was closely related.

== Rapparee ==
He was noted as a handsome man, and used to introduce himself to his victims by saying, "My name is Seamus Mac Murphy, the handsomest man in Ireland." (Mise Seumus 'A' Mhurchaidh is deise 'bhfuil in Eirinn). He had a reputation as a great drinker and a charming companion of many women. Yet it was alcoholism and promiscuity that were to lead to his downfall.

His close friend was Peadar Ó Doirnín, a fellow-poet with whom he founded a hedge school teaching Irish bardic poetry. They held regular sessions at Dunreavy Wood and Mullaghbane.

The two were actively involved in the planning for the Jacobite rising of 1745; McMurphy had also been an active rapparee since at least 1740. His main adversary was John Johnston of Roxborough, known as Johnston of the Fews, an infamous local tory- and priest hunter.

In the summer of 1744, Mac Murchaidh and O'Doirnin organised a monster meeting on Slieve Gullion to motivate the local people for the imminent arrival of Prince Charles Edward Stuart. As a result of the unrest caused by the Slieve Gullion meeting, Johnston was attacked and very seriously wounded. Though he survived, he met with McMurphy and Ó Doirnín, where they agreed to "an uneasy truce."

McMurphy and Ó Doirnín often attended a sibín or inn at Flagstaff (or Upper Fathom?), a mountain route to Omeath, owned by Patsy MacDecker, known as Paddy of the Mountain. The area remains particularly remote even in the 21st century, and in the 1740s was the perfect hideaway for rapparees.

McMurphy also took Paddy Mac Decker's daughter, Molly, as his mistress. However, their affair was stormy; after a heated argument and breakup, Molly allegedly vowed revenge on McMurphy. To this end, she gave Ó Doirnín alcohol one evening and persuaded him to compose a satirical poem about Johnston called The Heretic Headhunter. Molly then showed the poem to Johnston, claiming McMurphy was the author. Johnston was angered by this violation of their truce. In return, Molly was offered £50 by Johnston to help entrap McMurphy.

However, another version places the blame on one of Mac Murchaidh's lieutenants, Art Fearon, who wanted to win Molly’s favour. According to this account, he told her detailed stories about McMurphy’s numerous affairs with other women. Equally angered, Paddy MacDecker decided to claim the £50 that had already been offered as a reward, and joined the plan. On the Saturday night before the Pattern Day of Killeavy, McMurphy was scheduled to stay at the inn; the MacDeckers got him extremely drunk and off-guard.

However it came about, Johnston and his men caught McMurphy at MacDecker's sibín, sometime in late 1749 or early 1750.

== Trial and aftermath ==
McMurphy spent eight months in prison in Newry, County Down, before being tried, found guilty, and sentenced to execution. It is said that he had no fear on the day of his execution and forgave all those who helped capture him, including Molly. His body was left hanging for three days before it was taken down, laid out for two nights at his mother's barn in Carnally, and then buried in Creggan churchyard.

== Legacy ==
Paddy MacDecker is said to have received his bounty in copper coins at Armagh, so disgusted were the authorities with him. Folk legend has it that the effort of carrying the reward twenty miles home caused him to die just short of his house.

For violating the traditional Irish code of silence regarding both the police and the courts, Molly MacDecker was ostracised by her community, and became mentally ill. She eventually drowned herself at Narrow Water.

In 1973, Jem Murphy, a relation of the rapparee's family, erected a headstone to Seamus McMurphy in Creggan churchyard.
