= Art Mac Cumhaigh =

- Born: c.1738
- Died: 1773
- Resting place: Creggan Church Yard
- Writing career
- Language: Gaelic
- Notable work: Úr-Chill An Chreagáin

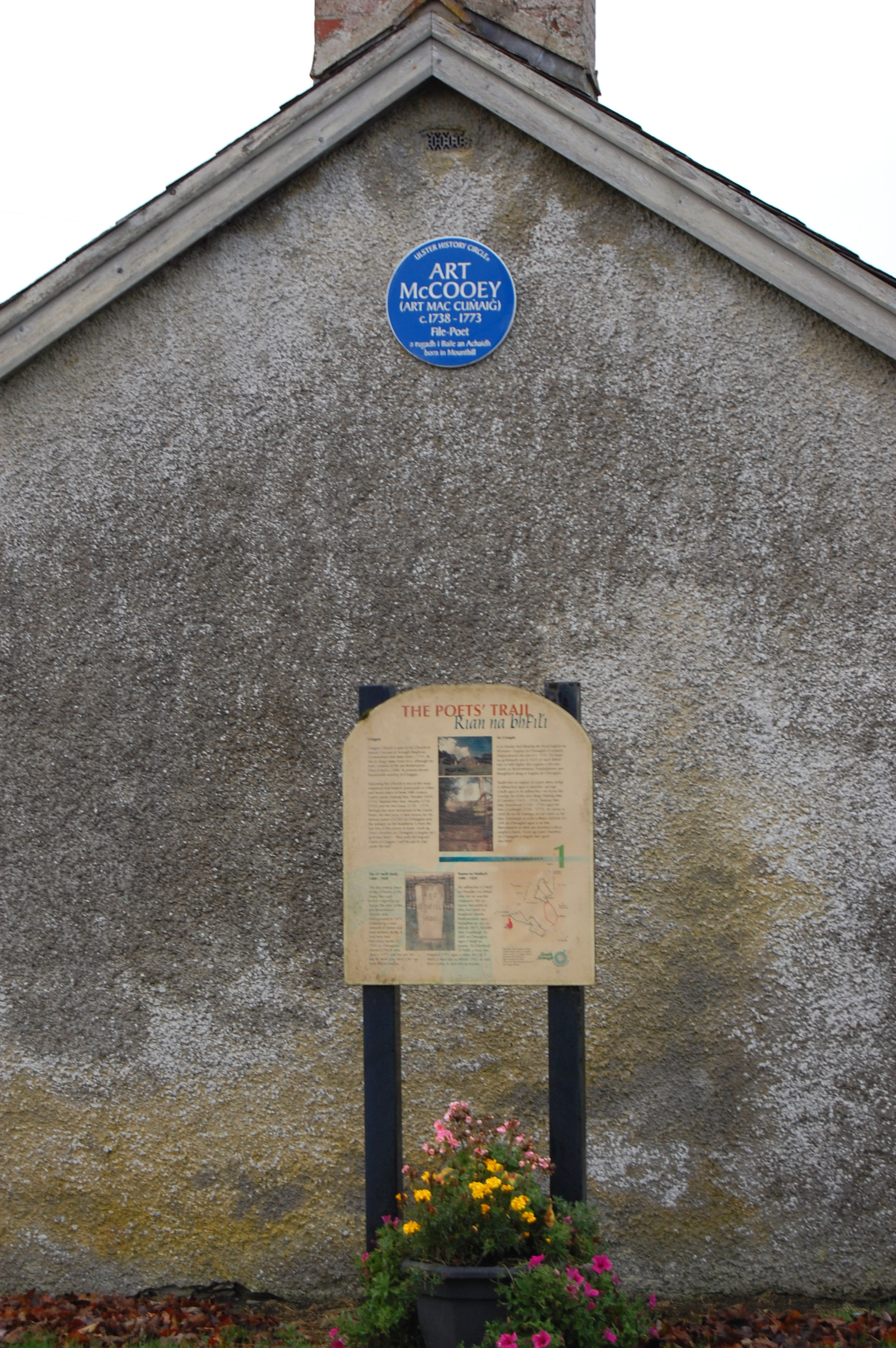
Memorial to Art McCooey at Creggan churchyard

Art Mac Cumhaigh (or Mac Cobhthaigh) (c. 1738–1773), or Art McCooey, was among the most celebrated of the south Ulster and north Leinster poets in the eighteenth century. He was part of the Airgíalla tradition of poetry and song.

== Origin ==
It is commonly believed that Mac Cumhaigh was born in Creggan, County Armagh, where a branch of the Uí Néill had been the traditional patrons of the poets under the old order. However, the most comprehensive research into Mac Cumhaigh's life and works could only suggest a birthplace on or near the Louth/Armagh border in or near the parish of Creggan.

== Poetry ==
Mac Cumhaigh (along with Cathal Buí Mac Giolla Ghunna, Peadar Ó Doirnín and Séamas Dall Mac Cuarta) was among the most celebrated of the south Ulster and north Leinster poets in the eighteenth century, and perhaps the best known. As with the latter two he was part of the Airgíalla (Oriel) tradition of poetry and song. All his known works appear to have been written in the 1760s or the early 1770s.

A 20th century history of the Parish of Creggan notes that, "the 18th century poets of Creggan—O Doirnin, MacAlinden, Oldr, MacArdle, MacCooey, MacVeigh and Dr. Woods — had already begun carving for themselves that niche in the Literary History of Ireland from which they are not likely to be dislodged by any other group of singers."

Seán Ó Tuama and Thomas Kinsella remark about Mac Cumhaigh's most famous poem, Úr-Chill An Chreagáin, that 'in its simple innocence is a more attractive aisling, perhaps, than some more polished vision-songs by the late eighteenth century Munster poets'. Unlike other works of aisling poetry, that poem does not mention the Stuart Pretender, nor does it hold out hope of foreign help coming to free Ireland. Úr-Chill An Chreagáin has been called the national anthem of South Ulster. According to legend, the poem was written while Mac Cumhaigh was on the run from John Johnston, Constable of the Fews, however Johnston died in 1749, so this is unlikely. Another legend is that it was written after he dreamed about a fair maiden inviting him to visit a far off land while he was in the O'Neill's vault, sleeping off the effects of heavy drinking. "It is one of two or three songs of which a popular version survived in the unbroken oral tradition in Oriel after the loss of the Irish language as the vernacular of the locality".

According to Julie Henigan, MacCumhaigh would also "compose bawdy songs, some of which were censored in anthologies but many of which entered community tradition". Some scholars (such as Breandán Ó Buachalla and Marianne Elliott have used his poems to illustrate society and politics in South Armagh in the eighteenth century. The poems reveal political history, the sufferings caused by the imposition of the penal laws and the social life of the people of the district. Patrick Cavanagh criticised his "whimsey and lack of specificity".

Mac Cumhaigh eked out a living as a spailpín, or travelling labourer. It is said that while working as a labourer for a local farmer, he took the same cartload of dung up and down a hill several times while engrossed in composing a poem or song.

No known written manuscripts his works survive; According to folklore, some of his manuscripts were used packing in a shop in Glasgow, while others may have been destroyed.

== Personal life ==
Little is known about his family life, except that he had a brother, Terence. He spent much of his life as a gardener and general labourer and at one time worked for the (Church of Ireland) Rector of Creggan.

Mac Cumhaigh wanted to marry Mary Lamb, but Father Quinn (the local priest) refused to marry them; perhaps because they were second cousins or perhaps because Mac Cumhaigh had written uncomplimentary verses about the priest's sister who was his housekeeper. The couple then chose to be married by a Protestant priest. As a result, Mary and Mac Cumhaigh were excommunicated by Father Quinn. Mac Cumhaigh and Father Quinn became reconciled when Mac Cumhaigh wrote another poem, this time in praise of the housekeeper and the couple were then re-married in the Catholic church.

Mac Cumhaigh died in 1773, aged 34. Mary went to bed leaving Mac Cumhaigh drinking with a visiting friend. She was awakened by fumes from his burning hat which had fallen in the fire. She returned and found him slumped dead in his chair. An alternative version of his death is that he had been drinking at a public house on the Castleblayney Road (close to a chapel known as "Mullens Cross" and was found dead by people going to mass. He was buried in Creggan churchyard, although there was no headstone and the location was known only to the family.

== Commemoration ==
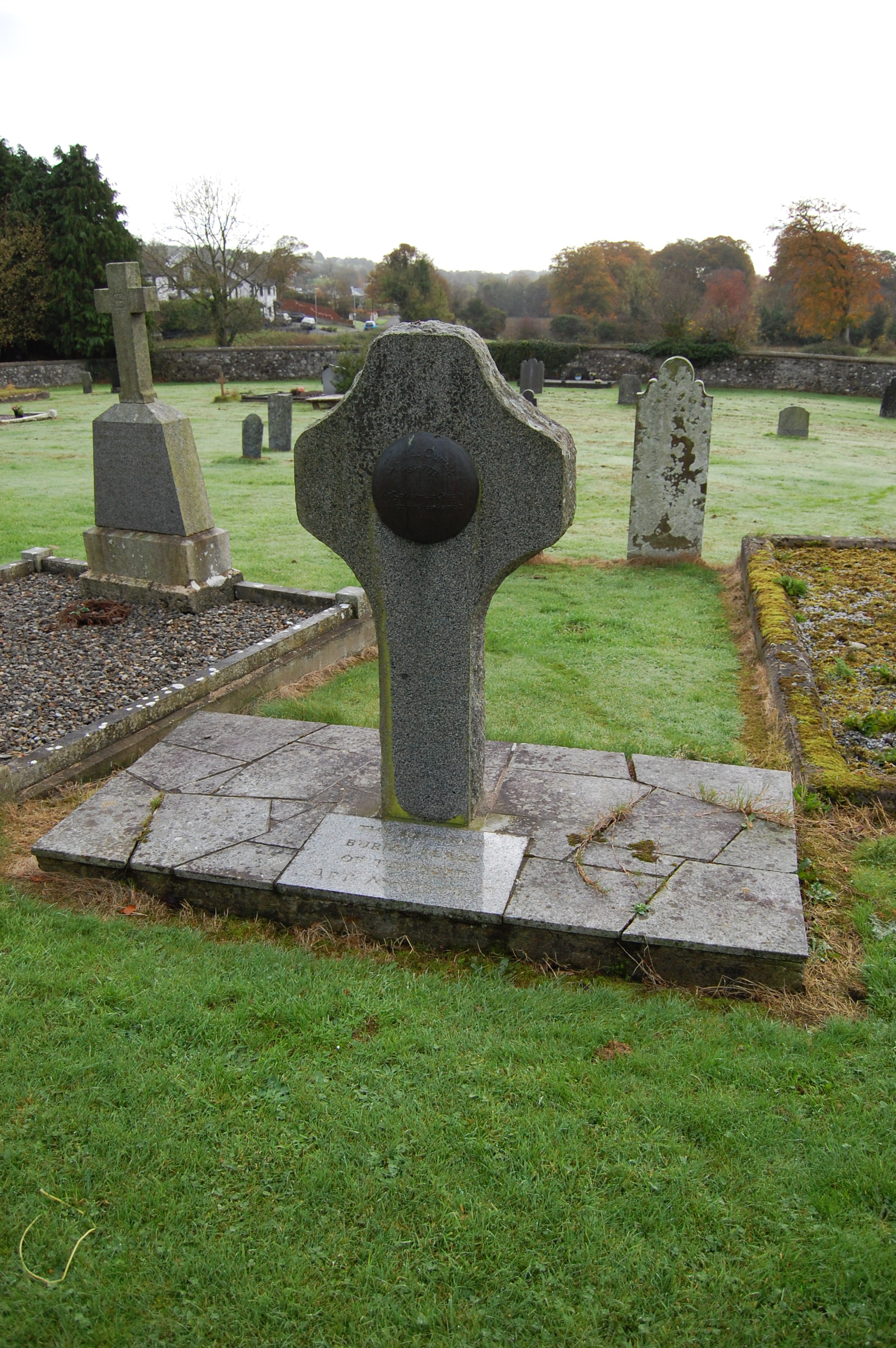
Stone erected close to the grave of Art McCooey

A headstone was erected in 1973 in Creggan churchyard. It carries a line from his best known poem "that with the fragrant Gaels of Creggan I will be put in clay under the sod". The headstone was unveiled by Senorita Conchita O’Neill from Seville in Spain.

On 14 May 2014, the Ulster History Circle unveiled a blue plaque to Mac Cumhaigh at the entrance to Creggan Church (using the name Art McCooey). Mac Cumhaigh also gives his name to Art McCooey Park in Glassdrummond.

== Name ==
The anglicised version of his name is usually given as Art MacCooey. His Gaelic surname is sometimes given as Mac Cobhthaigh (McCoffy). The published edition of his works gives his name as Airt mhic Cubhthaigh. His blue plaque uses the Anglicised name Art McCooey and Gaelic name Art Mac Cumaig.

== Publications ==
- Abhraín Airt mhic Cubhthaigh agus abhraín eile. Dundalgan Press. 1916.

== See also ==
- Piaras Feiritéar
- Dáibhí Ó Bruadair
- Cathal Buí Mac Giolla Ghunna
- Peadar Ó Doirnín
- Séamas Dall Mac Cuarta
- Aogán Ó Rathaille
- Seán Clárach Mac Dónaill
- Eoghan Rua Ó Súilleabháin
- Ceol Cheann Dubhrann
