= Cathal Buí Mac Giolla Ghunna =

Irish poet

Cathal Buí Mac Giolla Ghunna (c. 1680 – 1756; Anglicised as Yellow-haired Charles McElgunn) was an Irish poet.

== Biography ==
Cathal Buí Mac Giolla Ghunna is one of the four most prominent south Ulster and north Leinster poets in the seventeenth and eighteenth centuries. He has been described as an incisive ballad singing entertainer for a totally Irish-speaking community of poor people living at or below subsistence in the early 18th century. He was one of a school of ballad poetry that included Peadar Ó Doirnín, Art Mac Cumhaigh, and Séamas Dall Mac Cuarta.

Mac Giolla Ghunna was probably born in County Fermanagh and, having initially studied to be a Catholic priest, settled for a career as a rake-poet. It has been remarked about his poetry that 'of the handful of poems attributed to him, most are marked by a rare humanity, but none can match An Bonnán Buí (The Yellow Bittern) with its finely-judged blend of pathos and humour'. Although "Cathal Buí", as he is still affectionately termed in the folklore of Bréifne, is now little known in Ireland, his masterpiece An Bonnán Buí is one of the best known songs in Irish. "An Bonnán Buí" was based at Lough MacNean, which is situated between Fermanagh, Cavan and Leitrim. A monument in his honour, on the shores of Lough MacNean, was unveiled by Cearbhall Ó Dálaigh in 1975. He is buried in Donaghmoyne, Co. Monaghan.

A study of the Bréifne school of poetry is forthcoming from Pádraigín Ní Uallacháin.

The memory of Cathal Buí Mac Giolla Ghunna is celebrated annually in his homeland – Blacklion (Cavan) and Belcoo (Fermanagh). The latest iteration of this celebration is the Macnean Hedge School - The Cathalbui summer school was founded in 1998 and became the Cathalbui Festival in 2008. The current celebration of Cathalbui's memory, the Macnean Hedge School, incorporates the annual Cathalbui poetry competition and a study of James Joyce's work, Finnegans Wake. The Hedge School programme will not change.

== See also ==
- Piaras Feiritéar
- Dáibhí Ó Bruadair
- Aogán Ó Rathaille
- Peadar Ó Doirnín
- Séamas Dall Mac Cuarta
- Art Mac Cumhaigh
- Eoghan Rua Ó Súilleabháin
- Seán Clárach Mac Dónaill
