= Spailpín =

A spailpín (Irish: [ˈsˠpˠalʲpʲiːnʲ]), anglicised as spailpeen or spalpeen, or "wandering landless labourer" was an itinerant or seasonal farmworker in Ireland from the 17th to the early 20th century. The term derived from the Irish spailp, meaning "turn, spell, bout."

Conditions for such workers were very harsh. They endured hard physical labour, low wages and maltreatment by landowners. According to the Encyclopedia of Irish History and Culture, "(t)heir numbers were greatest during the difficult years of the 1820s and 1830s. On the whole, the seasonal workers were people who had close ties to the land: small farmers, cottiers, agricultural laborers, and generally poor people with family responsibilities and no means of earning a living at home. Women began to participate as workers to an important degree only in the middle of the nineteenth century, in the Scottish potato fields. Even before this, they provided support for the men by traveling with them; they begged for food and money to keep themselves and their children alive until the men returned home, and they undertook and organized essential farm work back in Ireland, thereby maintaining the small holding of land as the family home".

The difficult life of the landless labourer found ample echo in the arts. An example in folk tradition of exactly how harsh life for a spailpín was can be sensed in the song; "An Spáilpín Fánach" a lament of a man who had to become a spailpín because of his family's eviction. To avoid this terrible life, he joined the French army to fight overseas. The melody of An Spáilpín Fánach was used for the traditional song The Girl I Left Behind Me.

Some spailpíní found comfort and catharsis in the arts. Several were reputed scholars, musicians and poets. To reflect the misery and hardship in their everyday lives, many of their songs and poems were laments. For an excellent example of such a lament, see Matt Cranitch, The Irish Fiddle Book, Ossian Pub, page 114 and recording number 47.

Irish-language writer Máirtín Ó Cadhain's writing featured "dark ambiguities, seething resentments and petty humiliations" endured by spailpíní.

== See also ==
- History of Ireland
