= Peadar Ó Doirnín =

18th century Irish language poet

Peadar Ó Doirnín (c. 1700 – 1769), also known in English as Peter O'Dornin, was an Irish schoolteacher, Irish language poet and songwriter who spent much of his life in south-east Ulster.

== Biography ==
Ó Doirnín was born c.1700 possibly near Dundalk in County Louth. He was a teacher and the master of a number of hedge schools in Counties Louth and Armagh. He died at Forkill in 1769 and his elegy was composed by fellow poet Art Mac Cumhaigh. Ó Doirnín is buried in Urnaí graveyard in north County Louth. The Forkhill Peadar Ó Doirnín GAA club was named to commemorate the poet.

== Works ==
As a poet, and along with Art Mac Cumhaigh, Cathal Buí Mac Giolla Ghunna and Séamas Dall Mac Cuarta, Ó Doirnín was part of the Airgíalla tradition of Modern literature in Irish, particularly in poetry and song. His poetry and writings were collected from the local oral tradition and first published in the 19th and 20th centuries.

One of his poems, Mná na hÉireann, was later set to music composed by Seán Ó Riada and has been recorded by a number of 20th century artists including Kate Bush and Sinéad O'Connor. Other songs, such as Úrchnoc Chéin mhic Cáinte, make classic Gaelic appeals for a return to the solitude of nature.

Reputedly, due to the erotic poetry of Úrchnoc Chéin mhic Cáinte, Ó Doirnín was removed from one of his teaching jobs. Other poems by Ó Doirnín are described (for example in his Dictionary of Irish Biography entry) as humorous, bawdy and satirical, sometimes targeting other poets, Roman Catholic priests and fellow hedge school teachers.

== Collections ==
- Breandán Ó Buachalla (1969). Peadar Ó Doirnín: Amhráin. ISBN 9781851826858. OCLC 246066974.
- Seán de Rís (1969). Peadar Ó Doirnín, a bheatha agus a shaothar. ISBN 9781851826858. OCLC 5119451.

== See also ==
- Séamus Mór Mac Murphy
- Piaras Feiritéar
- Dáibhí Ó Bruadair
- Aogán Ó Rathaille
- Seán Clárach Mac Dónaill
- Eoghan Rua Ó Súilleabháin
