= Diarmuid Mac Muireadhaigh =

Diarmuid Mac Muireadhaigh, sometimes known in English as Dermot McMurray, was an Irish poet, alive in the late 17th century.

== Biography ==
Mac Muireadhaigh is believed to be the composer of a 23 verse poem in honour of Gordon O'Neill, an officer who fought for the army of King James II during the Jacobite War in Ireland. It is typically known by its opening line of "Gluaisigh ribh a ghlac rannsa ...". The poem is described by Paul Walsh as being "addressed to him [O'Neill] before the stirring times of his last years in Ireland", suggesting that it was written sometime in the 1680s.

No other details of Mac Muireadhaigh appear to be known, although a man of his surname was killed in action at the Battle of Aughrim in 1691, and was grandfather of Séamus Mór Mac Mhurchaidh, poet and outlaw, who was executed in 1750.

== Poem ==
The first four verses of the Gluaisigh ribh a ghlac rannsa poem commence as:

Gluaisigh ribh a ghlac rannsa
(ná fuirghe a bfad agamsa)
go hO Néill na ngruadh ngarrtha
do féin sdual gach deaghtarrtha
Abruidh uaim re a fholt tais
gur end sibh don chrann iomhais
do bhean me (sa taoibh re tuinn)
don chraoibh go ngé ^ núir náluinn
Innsigh dhósan do shúr suilt
doighre Cuind et Cormuic
go bfuil im sdórsa lámh libh
lán cóffra dona cnóaibh
Mac Sir Féidhlim flaith Eamhna
gion go labhair Gaoidhealga X.
do dhéin gáire gléghlan ruibh
ní náire dhó féin bhar bféuchuin

Go, ye handful of verses —
stay not long with me —
to Néill of the fine cheeks,
to him everything good is due.
Say to his soft hair, from me,
that ye are a nut from the tree
which I plucked — its side was towards the ground —
from the branch with fresh beautiful appearance.
Tell him, to excite mirth,
Conn's and Cormac's heir,
that in my store with ye
there is a cofferful.
Sir Féidhlim's son, Emhain's prince,
though he speaks not Irish, shall bestow
on ye a clear-bright laugh, no shame for
him it is to look upon ye.
