= Eoghan Rua Ó Súilleabháin =

Irish poet (1748-1784)

Eoghan Rua Ó Súilleabháin (1748 – 29 June 1784), anglicized as Owen Roe O'Sullivan ("Red Owen"), was an Irish poet. He is known as one of the last great Gaelic poets. A recent anthology of Irish-language poetry speaks of his "extremely musical" poems full of "astonishing technical virtuosity", and also notes that "Eoghan Rua is still spoken of and quoted in Irish-speaking districts in Munster as one of the great wits and playboys of the past."

Although previously known to speakers of Irish, especially in Munster, Ó Súilleabháin was relatively unknown to English speakers until the early 20th century. The Gaelic League published an Irish-language collection of his poems, with editorial apparatus in English, in 1901. In a 1903 book, Douglas Hyde, an Irish scholar from Roscommon who had learned Irish, referred to him as "a schoolmaster named O'Sullivan, in Munster" in his book The Songs of Connacht (which includes a drinking song by Ó Súilleabháin). The Encyclopædia Britannica Eleventh Edition (1911) mentioned Eoghan Rua in an article on "Celt" § Celtic Literature, calling him "the cleverest of the Jacobite poets" and noting that "his verses and bons mots are still well known in Munster."

In 1924, Daniel Corkery devoted a chapter of his groundbreaking book The Hidden Ireland (1924) to Ó Súilleabháin. The book was the first comprehensive look at the world of Irish-speakers during the 18th century, a period which had been considered completely barren except for English-language literature.

Corkery writes, "'What Pindar is to Greece, what Burns is to Scotland... that and much more is Eoghan Ruadh to Ireland.' Alas! it is by no means so; but were Father Dinneen to write: "That and much more was Eoghan Ruadh to Gaelic Munster," he would have understated rather than overstated the matter." He then discussed at length the way country people came alive at the mention of Ó Súilleabháin's name, and could recite long poems and a hundred stories about him.

"Eoghan Rua's life was ... tragic, but then he was a wastrel with a loud laugh." Ó Súilleabháin is most famous for his aisling poems, in which the vision of a beautiful woman comes to the poet in his sleep—the woman also often symbolizing the tragic Ireland of his time. Most of the following information comes from Corkery's work. Corkery in his turn depended on a book in the Irish language, Amhráin Eoghain Ruaidh Uí Shúilleabháin, or Songs of Eoghan Rua Ó Súilleabháin, written by the priest An t-Athair Pádraig Ua Duinnín (Father Dinneen).

== Early life ==
Eoghan Rua was born in 1748 in Meentogues, Gneeveguilla, Sliabh Luachra, a mountainous part of County Kerry, in southwestern Ireland. He was from a once-prominent Irish clan, but like so many others, it gradually lost its land and its Chiefs during the Tudor conquest of Ireland. By the time of his birth, most of the native Irish in the southwest had been reduced to landless poverty in a "houseless and unpeopled", mountainous region. However, the landlord was MacCarthy Mór, one of the few native Irish Chiefs of the Name to have retained some power and was a distant relative of the Clan Ó Súilleabháin, and in Sliabh Luachra, there was at the time one of the last "classical schools" of Irish poetry, descended from the ancient rigorous schools that had trained bards and poets in the days of Irish domination. In the last few remnants of the bardic schools, Irish poets competed for attention and rewards, and learned music, English, Latin and Greek.

Eoghan Rua (the Rua refers to his red hair) was witty and charming but had the misfortune to live at a time that an Irish Catholic had no professional future in his own country because of the anti-Catholic Penal Laws. He also had a reckless character and threw away the few opportunities he was given. At eighteen, he opened his own school, and "all his life through, whenever his fortunes were hopeless, on this empty trade Eoghan was to fall back." However, "an incident occurred, nothing to his credit, which led to the break-up of his establishment."

Eoghan Rua then became a spalpeen [Irish spailpín], or itinerant farm worker, until he was 31 years old. He then was conscripted into the British Armed Forces under interesting circumstances. Ó Súilleabháin was then working for the Nagles, a wealthy Anglo-Irish but Catholic and Irish-speaking, family in Fermoy, County Cork. (The Nagles were themselves an unusual family. The mother of the Anglo-Irish politician Edmund Burke was one of the Nagles, as was Nano Nagle, the founder of the charitable Presentation order of nuns.) Corkery writes, "I have had it told to myself that one day in their farmyard he heard a woman, another farm-hand, complain that she had need to write a letter to the master of the house, and had failed to find anyone able to do so. "I can do that for you", Eoghan said, and though doubtful, she consented that he should. Pen and paper were brought him, and he sat down and wrote the letter in four languages: in Greek, in Latin, in English, in Irish. "Who wrote this letter?" the master asked the woman in astonishment;/and the red-headed young labourer was brought before him; questioned, and thereupon set to teach the children of the house.....Owing to his bad behavior he had to fly the house, the master pursuing him with a gun". Legend says he was forced to flee when he got a woman pregnant: some say that it was Mrs. Nagle. (see Suantraí dá Mhac Tabhartha, which may relate to this incident).

== Later years ==
Ó Súilleabháin escaped to the British Army barracks in Fermoy. The British Empire was then in the midst of the American Revolutionary War and used impressment to fill its dire need for sailors. Ó Súilleabháin soon found himself aboard a Royal Navy ship in the West Indies, "one of those thousands of barbarously mistreated seamen". He sailed under Admiral Sir George Rodney and took part in the famous 1782 sea Battle of the Saintes against French Admiral Comte de Grasse. The British won, and to ingratiate himself with the Admiral, Ó Súilleabháin wrote an English-language poem, Rodney's Glory, about the battle and presented it to the Admiral, who offered to promote him. Ó Súilleabháin asked to be set free from service, but "an officer named MacCarthy, a Kerryman... interposed and said: 'Anything but that; we would not part from you for love or money'. Eoghan turned away, saying, Imireaochaimíd beart eigin eile oraibh ('I will play some other trick upon you'). MacCarthy, who understood his remark, replied: 'I'll take good care, Sullivan, you will not'".

Corkery writes of the odd contrast between the English view of Eoghan Rua, who must have seemed an awkward rascally fellow to the Admiral, and the Irish author of "perfect lyrics, with the intuitional poet in every line of them!"

Much of Eoghan Rua's life is unknown. He returned after the wars to Kerry and opened a school again. Soon afterwards, at 35, he died from fever that set in after he was struck by a pair of tongs in an alehouse quarrel by the servant of a local Anglo-Irish family. "The story of how, after the fracas in Knocknagree in which he was killed, a young woman lay down with him and tempted him to make sure he was really dead, was passed on with relish". He was buried in midsummer 1784, near or possibly in Muckross Abbey.

Memorial to Eoghan Rua Ó Súilleabháin at Knocknagree, County Cork, Ireland. The Irish words above the English are the last poem of Eoghan Rua on his deathbed: "Weak indeed is the poet when the pen falls out of his hand".

== Long-lived reputation ==
In spite of his luckless life, Eoghan Rua was well-beloved and legendary in his own time, and his songs and poems have passed down in the Gaeltacht, or Irish-speaking regions, of Munster, by word of mouth right up to the present day. Yeats used aspects of Ó Súilleabháin's reputation in his stories of Red Hanrahan, his invented alter ego, whose given name is "Owen", who carries a copy of Virgil in his pocket, "the hedge schoolmaster, a tall, strong, red-haired young man." In John Millington Synge's 1907 The Playboy of the Western World, the main female character Pegeen Mike compares the titular character (named Christy) to O'Sullivan:

"If you weren't destroyed travelling, you'd have as much talk and streeleen, I'm thinking, as Owen Roe O'Sullivan or the poets of the Dingle Bay, and I've heard all times it's the poets are your like, fine fiery fellows with great rages when their temper's roused."

Synge had spent much time in West Kerry and spoke Irish and so he had certainly heard the legends of Owen Roe. Christy's character resembles that of Owen Roe in many points.

Thanks in part to Corkery's book, Ó Súilleabháin has become more widely known in English over the years. The Irish musician Seán Ó Riada wrote a play based on the life of Owen Roe, called A Spailpín a Rún ("My Darling Spalpeen"). The song of the same name is part of the "Lament" in the music of Titanic. There is a memorial to him at Knocknagree, County Cork.

According to the Irish writer Frank O'Connor, Eoghan Rua's songs are as popular among Irish-speakers as those of Robert Burns are in Scotland. One of the most popular drinking songs in Ireland today is attributed to him: Bímíd ag ól is ag pógadh na mBan (Let us be drinking and kissing the women"). Translated into English in a book by Petrie (1855), one of its verses goes:

My name is Ó Súilleabháin, a most eminent teacher;
My qualifications will ne'er be extinct;
I'd write as good Latin as any in the nation;
No doubt I'm experienced in arithmetic.

"Owen Roe lived at the worst time in history for an Irish poet, when the Penal Laws were killing the ancient way of life and when Catholics had no legal way to make a professional living. He was a brilliant, red-haired, hard-living brawler, called "Owen of the Sweet Mouth" [Eoghan an Bhéil Bhinn], and in Munster I have myself still met Irish speakers who passed down the folk memory of his great charm.

== Literary works ==
According to Dinneen, none of Ó Súilleabháin's poems was printed in his lifetime. He wrote his poems, and they spread through song. He was most famous for his Aisling poems, set to popular music, about beautiful women, symbolizing Ireland in degradation at a time when the country's fortunes were at its nadir. The woman is described in great physical detail, and at least one of the poems is pornographic.

The Aisling, or vision of Erin... became in the hands of Eoghan a powerful means of instructing and delighting the popular mind. His was a time in which the study of Irish history and historical legend was rapidly on the wane.... The Aisling... served to keep alive the leading traditions of the past. The uneducated peasant... did not advert to the fact that he was receiving a lesson in history.... Perhaps there never was a poet so entirely popular-- never one of whom it could be more justly said volitar vivus per ora virum [He soars, alive in the mouths of the people]. His songs were sung everywhere.... Munster was spellbound for generations.... The present generation, to whom the Irish language is not vernacular, in reading these poems should bear in mind that they were all intended to be sung, and to airs then perfectly understood by the people, and that no adequate idea can be informed of their power over the Irish mind, unless they are heard sung by an Irish-speaking singer to whom they are familiar.

An example of the first verse of one of his poems (set to the tune "John O'Dwyer of the Glen"):

Mo chás! mo chaoi! mo cheasna!
An fáth thug claoidhte i n-easbaidh
fáide, draoite, sagairt,
dáim agus cléir,
gan dán dá ríomh le haiteas,
gan ráidte grinn dá n-aithris,
gan sám-chruit bhinn dá spreagadh,
i mbán-bhrogaidh réidhe!
's gach ráib d'fhuil Mhíleadh ceannais,
l'áidir, laochda, tapa,
ba ghnáthach rinnceach, reathach,
lán-oilte ar faobhar.
Gan stát, gan mhaoin, gan fearann,
ár is míle measa
'ná Seán Ua Duibhir an Ghleanna
fástha gan game.

My trouble! My lament! My torment!
The cause which left broken, in want,
prophets, poets, and priests,
the scholars and the clergy,
--no more poems composed with pleasure,
no more telling of witty stories,
no more lively musical harp-playing,
in tranquil fair mansions!
Every scion of the Milesian chiefs,
strong, courteous, quick,
used to dancing and racing,
skilful with weapons,
now without state, without wealth, without land,
slaughter and a thousand things worse
than John O'Dwyer of the Glens*
left without game.

- (The ballad of John O'Dwyer sings of the felling of Irish forests by the English rulers of Ireland in the 18th century.)

== See also ==
- Aogán Ó Rathaille
- Dáibhí Ó Bruadair
- Cathal Buí Mac Giolla Ghunna
- Peadar Ó Doirnín
- Séamas Dall Mac Cuarta
- Art Mac Cumhaigh
- Seán Clárach Mac Domhnaill
- Piaras Feiritéar
