= Séamas Dall Mac Cuarta =

Irish poet

Séamas Dall Mac Cuarta (c. 1647? – 1733) was an Irish poet. He was the originator of a seventeenth and eighteenth century Irish language school of poets, centred on the Oirialla region of the south-east of the province of Ulster and north of Leinster. Mac Cuarta's work emerged from a region in which there was no previous strong poetic tradition, unlike in north-western Ulster, and inspired a number of followers such as Peadar Ó Doirnín and Art Mac Cumhaigh: the emergence of the work of Mac Cuarta and his followers may have been a conscious response to local pressures of anglicisation, and the collapse of the traditional Gaelic social order.

Older English translations of his works often use the English form of his name, James McCuairt, or occasionally James Courtney.

== Background ==
Mac Cuarta was possibly born in Omeath in County Louth, although Kilkerley to the north-west of Dundalk is also mentioned as bearing links to his life; he appears to have spent most of his life moving around this area and the Boyne Valley. (Note: In Oxford Dictionary National Biography, it says that Mac Cuarta 'may have been born in the area known as Créamhainn (the tribal territory of Creamhthainn or Uí Chreamhthainn in early medieval times), on the borders of County Louth and County Monaghan, although some authorities have argued for a birthplace in the vicinity of Dundalk, others for one in County Meath, and still others—with perhaps greater probability—in the district of Omeath, County Louth, with which he is most closely identified.') As his name suggests, he was either blind or had seriously impaired vision and, at a time when gentry patronage of the poetic class was on the wane, this placed more emphasis on his literary skills rather than the traditional poetic tools of flattery towards their patrons. He was, by all accounts, very sociable and among his friends were fellow musicians and poets Niall Óg Mac Mhurchaidh, Pádraig Mac Giolla Fhiondáin (1665–1733), and Toirdhealbhach Ó Cearbhalláin (1670–1738).

== Works ==
His works display a close affiliation with the older literary traditions, as well as the influence of contemporary popular song and balladry. In the words of Nollaig Ó Muraíle, "Mac Cuarta's poetry reflects a familiarity with Irish literature and history, the classics (Greek and Latin), and the Bible."

=== Political influences ===
His poems also bear a very strong resonance to the political turmoil of the period or, as Ó Muraíle put it, 'Much of Mac Cuarta's work echoes the political events of his time, such as the catastrophic battle of Aughrim (1691)—which inspired Tuireamh Shomhairle Mhic Dónaill (a lament for a Catholic leader who fell in that battle)—and the subsequent subjugation of his people by the English, who are condemned both as foreigners and heretics.' Tuireamh Mhurcha Cruis is about a Jacobite soldier, one of the first Normans to settle in Ireland.

Among Séamas's patrons were chieftains of Gaelic and Norman origin, and he dedicated poems to, among others, Toirealach Ó Néill, Brian Mac Naois, Brian Mac Eoghain, Mac Airt Uí Néill, Baron Slane. He lamented in particular the overthrow of the Ó Néill chiefs of the Fews in south Armagh, whose castle in Glasdrummond lay deserted at the time of his writing. However, despite his praise of these nobles, Séamas dismissed nobles who he believed did not resist the English sufficiently; instead, he promoted men without noble lineage but who resisted the English conquest.

=== Nature influences ===
His poetry also displays a great love of nature, despite his blindness—a love most poignantly shown in 'Fáilte don éan' from c. 1707. His best poems are those in the form of Trí Rainn agus Amhrán: three stanzas in loose syllabic verse and one stanza in song form, where both traditions are finely merged. Unlike the classic poetry of most of his contemporaries, Mac Cuarta's work displays a strong feeling for nature, a tendency which marked the Early Irish poets. Other poems praise women, although these are not considered to be among his most passionate poems. Some fifty of Mac Cuarta's poems still survive. They are contained in about 130 manuscripts, the earliest of which is from c. 1690.

== Death ==
Séamas Dall Mac Cuarta died in 1733, and is buried in an unmarked grave in the old graveyard at Monknewton, County Meath.

== See also ==
- Piaras Feiritéar
- Dáibhí Ó Bruadair
- Cathal Buí Mac Giolla Ghunna
- Peadar Ó Doirnín
- Aogán Ó Rathaille
- Art Mac Cumhaigh
- Eoghan Rua Ó Súilleabháin
- Seán Clárach Mac Dónaill
