= Dáibhí Ó Bruadair =

Irish poet (1625–1698)

Dáibhí Ó Bruadair (1625 – January 1698) was a 17th-century Irish language poet who was probably received his training in a Bardic school . He lived through a period of change in Irish history, and his work reflects the demise of the old Irish cultural and political order and the decline in position of poets in Irish society. His ode, D'Aithle Na bhFileadh ("The High Poets are Gone"), written upon the death of a fellow poet, laments this decline and reflects that Ireland was now a far less educated place due to it.

== Biography ==
Ó Bruadair was born in Barrymore, County Cork and spent much of his adult life in County Limerick, receiving the patronage of both Irish and Anglo-Irish landowners. This patronage was vital, as Ó Bruadair was the first of the 17th-century poets to attempt to live purely from his poetry, in the manner of the professional bards of the medieval period. It would seem that this attempt was not particularly successful, as his poem Is mairg nár chrean le maitheas saoghalta indicates that he was reduced to working as a farm labourer. He died in poverty and, as poems such as Mairg nach fuil 'na Dhubhthuata ("O It's best be a total boor") show, with bitterness on him towards the 'blind ignorant crew' that was the uneducated peasantry. This view was also reflected by poets such as Brian Mac Giolla Phádraig.

As well as Irish, Ó Bruadair knew Latin and English. As a poet, he wrote on historical and political subjects, as well as producing elegies on a number of his patrons, satires on Cromwellian planters, religious poems and, almost uniquely amongst Gaelic poets, at least two epithalamia. His versification was also varied, and he wrote in both syllabic and assonantal metres.

== Bibliography ==
- MacErlean, John C., ed. (1910). The poems of David Ó Bruadair; Part I: to 1666. ITS main series (in Irish and English). Vol. XI. London: Irish Texts Society.
- MacErlean, John C., ed. (1913). The poems of David Ó Bruadair; Part II: 1667–1682. ITS main series (in Irish and English). Vol. XIII. London: Irish Texts Society.
- MacErlean, John C., ed. (1917). The poems of David Ó Bruadair; Part III: 1682–1698. ITS main series (in Irish and English). Vol. XVIII. London: Irish Texts Society.
