= 2008 Ulster Senior Club Football Championship =

Tournament details
- County: Ulster
- Year: 2008

Winners
- Champions: Crossmaglen (7th win)
- Manager: Donal Murtagh
- Captain: John Donaldson

The 2008 Ulster Senior Club Football Championship was the 41st staging of the annual Ulster Senior Club Football Championship which is administered by Ulster GAA. Nine GAA county boards compete for the Séamus McFerran Cup. The championship started on 19 October 2008 and concluded with the final replay on 14 December 2008.

Crossmaglen Rangers won the competition, beating Ballinderry Shamrocks in the final, after a replay. Crossmaglen therefore went on to compete in the 2009 All-Ireland Senior Club Football Championship.

== Draw ==
Preliminary Round
Mayobridge (Down)	2–05
St Gall's (Antrim)	0–12

Quarter-finals
St Gall's (Antrim)	0–07
Cavan Gaels (Cavan)	1–07
Latton (Monaghan)	0–10
Ballinderry (Derry)	1–11
St Eunan's (Donegal)	2–10
Clonoe (Tyrone)	1–08
Crossmaglen (Armagh)	0–13
St Patrick's Donagh (Fermanagh)	0–06

Semi-finals
Cavan Gaels (Cavan)	0–07
Ballinderry (Derry)	0–17
St Eunan's (Donegal)	0–08
Crossmaglen (Armagh)	0–11

Final
Ballinderry (Derry)	1–10; R:
Crossmaglen (Armagh)	1–10; R:

- Source: Hogan Stand website.

== Preliminary round ==
19 October 2008; 3.30pm	Mayobridge (Down)	2–05 – 0–12	St Gall’s (Antrim)	Páirc Esler, Newry; Referee: Martin Sludden (Tyrone)
19 October 2008; 3.30pm	Ronan Sexton 1-01; Brendan Coulter 1-01; Noel Sexton 0-03 (0-01 free)	BBC report Belfast Telegraph report	CJ McGourty 0-04 (0-01 free); Kevin Niblock 0-02; Karl Stewart 0-02 (0-01 free); Sean Kelly 0-01; Anto Healy 0-01; Terry O'Neill 0-01; Kevin McGourty 0-01	Páirc Esler, Newry; Referee: Martin Sludden (Tyrone)

== Quarter-finals ==
2 November 2008; 2.30pm	St Gall's (Antrim)	0–07 – 1–07	Cavan Gaels (Cavan)	Casement Park, Belfast; Referee: Michael Hughes (Tyrone)
2 November 2008; 2.30pm	CJ McGourty 0-03; Sean Kelly 0-01; Kevin McGourty 0-01; S O'Neill 0-01; Karl Stewart 0-01 (frees?)	BBC report Hoganstand report Belfast Telegraph report	Seánie Johnston 0-05; Micheál Lyng 1-00; E Reilly 0-01; N Murray0-01 (frees?)	Casement Park, Belfast; Referee: Michael Hughes (Tyrone)

2 November 2008; 2.30pm	Ballinderry (Derry)	1–11 – 0–10	Latton (Monaghan)	Dean McGlinchey Park, Ballinascreen; Referee: Jimmy White (Donegal)
2 November 2008; 2.30pm	Conleith Gilligan 0-06 (0-04 frees); Raymond Wilkinson 1-02; Enda Muldoon 0-02; Kevin 'Moss' McGuckin 0-01	BBC report Hoganstand report Belfast Telegraph report	Bernard O'Brien 0-03 (0-01 free); Hugh McElroy 0-02 (0-02 frees); Hughie Lennon 0-01; Aidan Farmer 0-01; Eoin Duffy 0-01; Noel Coyle 0-01; Martin O'Brien 0-01	Dean McGlinchey Park, Ballinascreen; Referee: Jimmy White (Donegal)

2 November 2008; 2.30pm	Clonoe (Tyrone)	1–08 – 2–10	St Eunan's (Donegal)	Fr. Peter Campbell Park, Coalisland; Referee: J McKee (Armagh)
2 November 2008; 2.30pm	R.R. O'Neill 1-01; R.T. O'Neill 0-03; S McNulty 0-02; D Burke 0-01; Colm Doris 0-01 (frees?)	BBC report Hoganstand report Belfast Telegraph report	Brendan Devenney 0-04; K Sharkey 1-01; D McGinley 1-00; Ross Wherity 0-02; Conall Dunne 0-01; Rory Kavanagh 0-01; Kevin Rafferty 0-01 (frees?)	Fr. Peter Campbell Park, Coalisland; Referee: J McKee (Armagh)

9 November 2008; 2.30pm	Crossmaglen (Armagh)	0–13 – 0–06	St Patrick's Donagh (Fermanagh)	St. Oliver Plunkett Park, Crossmaglen; Referee: Brian Crowe (Cavan)
9 November 2008; 2.30pm	Oisín McConville 0-03 (0-02 frees); Aaron Kernan 0-03 (0-02 frees); David McKenna 0-02; Martin Aherne 0-02; Tony Kernan 0-02; Kyle Carragher 0-01	BBC report Hoganstand report Belfast Telegraph report	Shane McDermott 0-01; Patrick Cadden 0-01 (0-01 free); Gary Maguire 0-01; Eamon Maguire 0-03 (0-01 free)	St. Oliver Plunkett Park, Crossmaglen; Referee: Brian Crowe (Cavan)

== Semi-finals ==
16 November 2008; 2.30pm	Cavan Gaels (Cavan)	0–07 – 0–17	Ballinderry (Derry)	Athletic Grounds, Armagh; Referee: Pat McEnaney (Monaghan)
16 November 2008; 2.30pm	Micheál Lyng 0-02 (0-01 free); R Maloney Derham 0-01; Enda King 0-01; Niall Murray 0-01; Seanie Johnston 0-01; C McClarey 0-01	BBC report Hogan Stand report Belfast Telegraph report	Coilin Devlin 0-05 (0-03 frees); Raymond Wilkinson 0-03; Martin Harney 0-02; Enda Muldoon 0-02 (0-01 '45); James Bateson 0-02; Darren Conway 0-01; Conleith Gilligan 0-01; Michael Bell 0-01	Athletic Grounds, Armagh; Referee: Pat McEnaney (Monaghan)

16 November 2008; 2.30pm	St Eunan's (Donegal)	0–08 – 0–11	Crossmaglen (Armagh)	Brewster Park, Enniskillen; Referee: Joe McQuillan (Cavan)
16 November 2008; 2.30pm	Ross Wherity 0-03 (0-01 '45); Conall Dunne 0-03 (0-02 frees); Rory Kavanagh 0-01; P McGowan 0-01	BBC report Hogan Stand report Belfast Telegraph report	Oisín McConville 0-06 (0-05 frees); John McEntee 0-02; Aaron Kernan 0-01 (0-01 free); Tony Kernan 0-01; John Murtagh 0-01	Brewster Park, Enniskillen; Referee: Joe McQuillan (Cavan)

== Final ==
30 November 2008 ?.??pm	Crossmaglen (Armagh)	1–10 – 1–10	Ballinderry (Derry)	Brewster Park, Enniskillen; Referee: Martin Sludden (Tyrone)
30 November 2008 ?.??pm	Oisín McConville 1-02 (0-01/2 frees); Aaron Kernan 0-02 (0-02 frees); David McKenna 0-01; Michael McNamee 0-02; Stephen Kernan 0-01; Tony Kernan 0-01; Johnny Murtagh 0-01	BBC report Hogan Stand report Belfast Telegraph report	Coilin Devlin 0-06 (0-03/4 frees); Niall McCusker 1-00; James Conway 0-01; Darren Conway 0-01; Enda Muldoon 0-01; Conleith Gilligan 0-01	Brewster Park, Enniskillen; Referee: Martin Sludden (Tyrone)

Ballinderry Shamrocks	Crossmaglen Rangers

Ballinderry Shamrocks:
1	Michael Conlan
2	Declan Bell
3	Niall McCusker
4	Conor Wilkinson	(yellow card) 2' (yellow-red card) 30'
5	Michael McIver
6	Kevin McGuckin	(yellow card) 24'
7	Conor Nevin		(substituted off) 39'
8	James Conway	(yellow card) 8'
14	Enda Muldoon (c)
10	Martin Harney		(substituted off) 33'
11	Darren Conway
?	Coilin Devlin
13	Raymond Wilkinson
?	Brian McGuckin		(substituted off) 48'
15	Conleith Gilligan		(substituted off) 60'
Substitutes:
??	Ronan McGuckin	(yellow card) 60'	(substituted on) 33'
??	Michael Bell		(substituted on) 39'
??	James Bateson		(substituted on) 48'
??	Gerard Cassidy		(substituted on) 60'
Manager:
Martin McKinless

Crossmaglen Rangers:
1	Paul Hearty
2	Brendan McKeown
7	Paul Kernan
4	P McKeown
5	Aaron Kernan	(yellow card) 2'
3	Francie Bellew	(yellow card) 40'	(substituted off) 52'
6	John Donaldson (c)
8	Tony McEntee
9	David McKenna
10	Michael McNamee	(yellow card) 9' (yellow-red card) 39'
11	John McEntee	(red card) 53'
12	Stephen Kernan		(substituted off) 55'
13	Tony Kernan	(yellow card) 30'	(substituted off) 44'
14	Cathal Short		(substituted off) 40'
15	Oisín McConville
Substitutes:
??	Johnny Murtagh		(substituted on) 40'
??	Jamie Clarke		(substituted on) 44'
??	Stephen Finnegan		(substituted on) 52'
??	Rico Kelly		(substituted on) 55'
Manager:
Donal Murtagh

MATCH RULES

- 60 minutes.
- Replay if necessary.
- Nine named substitutes.
- Maximum of 5 substitutions.

=== Replay ===
14 December 2008 ?.??pm	Crossmaglen (Armagh)	0–12 – 1–04	Ballinderry (Derry)	Brewster Park, Enniskillen; Referee: Brian Crowe (Cavan)
14 December 2008 ?.??pm	Oisín McConville 0-05 (0-02 frees, 0-01 penalty); Michael McNamee 0-02; P. McKeown 0-01; Aaron Kernan 0-01 (0-01 free); Jamie Clarke 0-01; Johnny Murtagh 0-01		James Bateson 1-00; Conleith Gilligan 0-02 (0-01 free); James Conway 0-01; Martin Harney 0-01	Brewster Park, Enniskillen; Referee: Brian Crowe (Cavan)

Ballinderry Shamrocks	Crossmaglen Rangers

Ballinderry Shamrocks:
Michael Conlan
Declan Bell	(substituted off) 54'
Niall McCusker
Conor Wilkinson
Kevin McGuckin
Ronan McGuckin
Michael Bell
James Conway
Kevin 'Moss' McGuckin	(substituted off) 45 to 48 (blood sub)' (substituted off) 57'
Darren Conway (c)
Conleith Gilligan
Raymond Wilkinson
Coilin Devlin
Martin Harney
Brian McGuckin	(substituted off) ht'
Substitutes:
James Bateson	(substituted on) ht'
Paul Wilson	(substituted on) 54'
Ryan Scott	(substituted on) 57'
Shane Rocks	(substituted on) 45 to 48 (blood sub)'
Manager:
Martin McKinless

Crossmaglen Rangers:
Paul Hearty
Brendan McKeown
Paul Kernan
P McKeown
Aaron Kernan
Francie Bellew
John Donaldson (c)
Tony McEntee
David McKenna
Stephen Kernan	(substituted off) 42'
John McEntee
Michael McNamee
Jamie Clarke	(substituted off) 51'
Johnny Murtagh	(substituted off) 55'
Oisín McConville
Substitutes:
Tony Kernan	(substituted on) 42'
Kyle Carragher	(substituted on) 51'
Johnathon Hanratty	(substituted on) 55'
Manager:
Donal Murtagh

MATCH RULES

- 60 minutes.
- Extra-time if necessary.
- Further replay if scores still level.
- Nine named substitutes.
- Maximum of 5 substitutions.
