= List of Armagh inter-county footballers =

This is a very incomplete list of Gaelic footballers who have played at senior level for the Armagh county team.

== List of players ==
=== A–L ===
- Francie Bellew: Until 2009
- Jarlath Burns
- Rónán Clarke
- Brendan Donaghy: for 17 years, until 2022
- Paul Hearty: For 12 years, until 2012
- Ger Houlahan
- Aaron Kernan: For a decade, until 2014
- Joe Kernan

=== M ===
- Oisín McConville
- Jim McCorry
- Steven McDonnell: 1999–2012
- John McEntee
- Tony McEntee
- Kieran McGeeney: For 17 years, until 2007
- Paul McGrane: Until 2009
- Colum McKinstry
- Enda McNulty
- Justin McNulty
- Andy Mallon: For 14 years, until 2017
- Seamus Mallon
- Diarmaid Marsden: 1993–2005, 117 appearances
- Paddy Moriarty
- Alf Murray

=== N–Z ===
- Aidan O'Rourke: Until 2006
- Benny Tierney
- Jimmy Whan 1955-1968
