= 2012 Ulster Senior Club Football Championship =

2012 Ulster Club Senior Football Championship
Tournament details
- Province: Ulster
- Year: 2012
- Trophy: Seamus McFerran Cup
- Sponsor: Allied Irish Banks
- Date: 21 October - 2 December 2012
- Teams: 9 (one from each of the 9 counties)
- Defending champions: Crossmaglen Rangers

Winners
- Champions: Crossmaglen Rangers (10th win)
- Manager: Tony McEntee; Gareth O'Neill
- Captain: David McKenna
- Qualify for: All-Ireland Club SFC

Runners-up
- Runners-up: Kilcoo
- Manager: Jim McCorry
- Captain: Gary McEvoy

Other
- Matches played: 8
- Total scored: 17-162
- Top Scorer: Oisín McConville (Crossmaglen Rangers) (1-11)
- Website: Ulster GAA

The 2012 Ulster Senior Club Football Championship was the 45th instalment of the annual competition organised by Ulster GAA. It was one of the four provincial competitions of the 2012–13 All-Ireland Senior Club Football Championship.

Crossmaglen Rangers of Armagh were the defending champions, having defeated Down champions Burren in the 2011 final.

Crossmaglen successfully defended their title after beating Down's Kilcoo in the final.

== Teams ==
The Ulster championship is contested by the winners of the nine county championships in the Irish province of Ulster. Ulster comprises the six counties of Northern Ireland, as well as Cavan, Donegal and Monaghan in the Republic of Ireland.

County	Team	Last win
Antrim	St Gall's	2009
Armagh	Crossmaglen Rangers	2011
Cavan	Mullahoran	
Derry	Ballinderry Shamrocks	2001
Donegal	St Eunan's	
Down	Kilcoo	
Fermanagh	Tempo Maguires	
Monaghan	Ballybay Pearse Brothers	
Tyrone	Errigal Ciarán	2002

== Bracket ==
Preliminary Round
Mullahoran (Cavan)	1-7
Errigal Ciarán (Tyrone)	4-15

Quarter-Finals
Errigal Ciarán (Tyrone)	0-11
Ballinderry Shamrocks (Derry)	0-10
Crossmaglen Rangers (Armagh)	3-11
St Eunan's (Donegal)	1-7
Ballybay Pearse Brothers (Monaghan)	0-7
Kilcoo (Down)	0-13
Tempo Maguires (Fermanagh)	0-9
St Gall's (Antrim)	1-15

Semi-Finals
Errigal Ciarán (Tyrone)	0-10
Crossmaglen Rangers (Armagh)	2-10
Kilcoo (Down)	1-9
St Gall's (Antrim)	0-10

Final
Crossmaglen Rangers (Armagh)	3-9
Kilcoo (Down)	1-9

== Preliminary round ==
21 October 2012
15:30 GMT (UTC+0)
Preliminary Round

Mullahoran (Tyrone)	1-7 – 4-15	Errigal Ciarán (Tyrone)
Enda O'Reilly 0-4 (0-4f), Fergal Brady 1-0, Eddie O'Reilly 0-2 (0-2f), Dermot Sheridan 0-1	Report	Damien McDermott 1-2 (0-2f), Tommy Canavan 1-2, Brian Horisk 1-1, Peter Harte 1-0, Ronan McRory 0-3, Davy Harte 0-2, Stefan Tierney 0-2, Darren Canavan 0-2, Enda McGinley 0-1

Breffni Park, Cavan
Referee: Pádraig Hughes

== Quarter-finals ==
4 November 2012
14:30 GMT (UTC+0)
Quarter-final

Tempo Maguires (Fermanagh)	0-9 – 1-15	St Gall's (Antrim)
Daryl Keenan 0-4 (0-3f), Ciaran McElroy 0-4, Thomas Campbell 0-1	Report	Aodhan Gallagher 1-0, CJ McGourty 0-3 (0-1f), Sean Burke 0-2, Kevin McGourty 0-2, Kevin Niblock 0-2, Mark Kelly 0-1, Sean Kelly 0-1, Terry O'Neill 0-1, Kieran McGourty 0-1, Michael Pollock 0-1, Karl Stewart 0-1

Brewster Park, Enniskillen
Referee: Cathal O'Hagan

4 November 2012
14:30 GMT (UTC+0)
Quarter-final

Ballybay Pearse Brothers (Monaghan)	0-7 – 0-13	Kilcoo (Down)
Thomas Kerr 0-2 (0-2f), Shane McGuinness 0-2 (0-1f), Brian McCabe 0-1, Hugh Malone 0-1, Paul Stuart 0-1	Report	Jerome Johnston 0-4, Darragh O'Hanlon 0-3 (0-2f), Paul Devlin 0-2 (0-1f), Niall Branagan 0-1, Paul Greenan 0-1, Donal Kane 0-1, Ryan Johnston 0-1

St Tiernach's Park, Clones
Referee: Barry Cassidy

4 November 2012
14:30 GMT (UTC+0)
Quarter-final

Errigal Ciarán (Tyrone)	0-11 – 0-10	Ballinderry Shamrocks (Derry)
Tommy Canavan 0-5 (0-3f), Brian Horisk 0-3, Davy Harte 0-1, Ciaran McGinley 0-1, Caolan Tierney 0-1,	Report	Coilin Devlin 0-4, Conleith Gilligan 0-2, Dermot McGuckin 0-2, Enda Muldoon 0-1 (0-1f), Kevin McGuckin 0-1

Healy Park, Omagh
Referee: Ciaran Branagan

11 November 2012
14:30 GMT (UTC+0)
Quarter-final

Crossmaglen Rangers (Armagh)	3-11 – 1-7	St Eunan's (Donegal)
Aaron Kernan 1-2 (0-2f), Oisín McConville 0-4 (0-3f), Kyle Carragher 1-0, Paul Grant 1-0, David McKenna 0-2, Tony Kernan 0-1 (0-1f), Callum Cumiskey 0-1, Paul Hughes 0-1	Report	John Haran 1-0, Ross Wherity 0-3, Mark McGowan 0-1 (0-1f), Conor Gibbons 0-1 (0-1f), Conall Dunne 0-1, Lee McMonagle 0-1

Athletic Grounds, Armagh
Referee: Martin Higgins

== Semi-finals ==
18 November 2012
14:15 GMT (UTC+0)
Semi-final

Errigal Ciarán (Tyrone)	0-10 – 2-10	Crossmaglen Rangers (Armagh)
Darren Canavan 0-3 (0-1f), Tommy Canavan 0-3, Ronan McRory 0-2, Cormac McGinley 0-1, Peter Harte 0-1	Report	Oisín McConville 0-5 (0-3f), Jamie Clarke 1-1, David McKenna 1-0, Stephen Kernan 0-1 (0-1f), Padraig Hughes 0-1, Tony Kernan 0-1, Aaron Kernan 0-1

St Tiernach's Park, Clones
Referee: Joe McQuillan

18 November 2012
14:30 GMT (UTC+0)
Semi-final

Kilcoo (Down)	1-9 – 0-10	St Gall's (Antrim)
Sean Devlin 1-0, Paul Devlin 0-3 (0-2f), Darragh O'Hanlon 0-3 (0-1f), Gerard McEvoy 0-1, Conor Laverty 0-1, Ryan Johnston 0-1	Report	Karl Stewart 0-4, Kevin Niblock 0-3, CJ McGourty 0-1 (0-1f), Sean Kelly 0-1, Michael Pollock 0-1

Athletic Grounds, Armagh
Referee: Martin Sludden

== Final ==
2 December 2012
14:00 GMT (UTC+0)
Final

Crossmaglen Rangers (Armagh)	3-9 – 1-9	Kilcoo (Down)
Oisín McConville 1-2 (1-0 pen, 0-2f), Aaron Kernan 1-1 (0-1f), Kyle Brennan 1-0, Stephen Kernan 0-2, Martin Aherne 0-1, Aaron Cunningham 0-1, Tony Kernan 0-1	Report	Darragh O'Hanlon 0-4 (0-3f), Paul Devlin 0-3 (0-3f), Anthony Devlin 1-0, Donal Kane 0-1, Ryan Johnston 0-1

Athletic Grounds, Armagh
Attendance: 8,264
Referee: Joe McQuillan

== Championship statistics ==
=== Top scorers ===
Overall

Rank	Player	Club	Tally	Total	Matches	Average
1	Oisín McConville	Crossmaglen Rangers	1-11	14	3	4.67
2	Tommy Canavan	Errigal Ciarán	0-13	13	3	4.33
3	Aaron Kernan	Crossmaglen Rangers	2-4	10	3	3.33
3	Darragh O'Hanlon	Kilcoo	0-10	10	3	3.33
5	Paul Devlin	Kilcoo	0-8	8	3	2.33
6	Brian Horisk	Errigal Ciarán	1-4	7	3	2.33
7	David McKenna	Crossmaglen Rangers	1-2	5	3	1.67
7	Damien McDermott	Errigal Ciarán	1-2	5	2	2.50
7	Ronan McRory	Errigal Ciarán	0-5	5	3	1.67
7	Kevin Niblock	St Gall's	0-5	5	2	2.50
7	Karl Stewart	St Gall's	0-5	5	2	2.50

In a single game

Rank	Player	Club	Tally	Total	Opposition
1	Oisín McConville	Crossmaglen Rangers	1-2	5	Kilcoo
1	Aaron Kernan	Crossmaglen Rangers	1-2	5	St Eunan's
1	Tommy Canavan	Errigal Ciarán	1-2	5	Mullahoran
1	Damien McDermott	Errigal Ciarán	1-2	5	Mullahoran
1	Oisín McConville	Crossmaglen Rangers	0-5	5	Errigal Ciarán
1	Tommy Canavan	Errigal Ciarán	0-5	5	Ballinderry Shamrocks
7	Brian Horisk	Errigal Ciarán	1-1	4	Mullahoran
7	Jamie Clarke	Crossmaglen Rangers	1-1	4	Errigal Ciarán
7	Aaron Kernan	Crossmaglen Rangers	1-1	4	Kilcoo
7	Oisín McConville	Crossmaglen Rangers	0-4	4	St Eunan's
7	Jerome Johnston	Kilcoo	0-4	4	Ballybay Pearse Brothers
7	Darragh O'Hanlon	Kilcoo	0-4	4	Crossmaglen Rangers
7	Enda O'Reilly	Mulahoran	0-4	4	Errigal Ciarán
7	Daryl Keenan	Tempo Maguires	0-4	4	St Gall's
7	Ciaran McElroy	Tempo Maguires	0-4	4	St Gall's
7	Karl Stewart	St Gall's	0-4	4	Kilcoo
7	Coilin Devlin	Ballinderry Shamrocks	0-4	4	Errigal Ciarán
