= Niall McCusker =

Derry Gaelic footballer

Personal information
- Native name: Niall Mac Oscair (Irish)
- Nickname: Big Niall
- Born: 8 December 1980 (age 45) Ballinderry, County Londonderry, Northern Ireland
- Occupation: Flooring contractor

Sport
- Sport: Gaelic football
- Position: Full back
Club
- Years: Club
- 199x–present: Ballinderry
Club titles
- Derry titles: 4
- Ulster titles: 1
- All-Ireland Titles: 1
Inter-county
Years	County	Apps (scores)
1999–present	Derry	?
Inter-county titles
- NFL: 2

Niall McCusker (born 8 December 1980) is a Gaelic footballer who plays for the Derry county team, with whom he has won two National League titles. He is the current Derry vice-captain.

McCusker plays his club football for Ballinderry Shamrocks. He was instrumental in helping Ballinderry win the 2002 All-Ireland Senior Club Football Championship. He has also won four Derry Championships and an Ulster Senior Club Football Championship with the club.

He is seen as a tough, old-fashioned full-back, but is versatile and can play in almost any position. Adrian McGuckin said of McCusker "He has a great footballing brain, his positional sense is unreal and he never wastes a ball". Fellow Derry full back and captain Kevin McCloy says "I'd rather run into a train than run into Niall McCusker".

== Playing career ==
=== Inter-county ===
McCusker made his Derry Senior debut in 1998. In 2000 he won the National League with Derry, defeating Meath in the final. McCusker was named Derry vice-captain for 2005. He sat out the 2006 and 2007 campaign, but was recalled for the 2008 campaign. He was part of the Derry team that won the 2008 National League where Derry beat Kerry in the final. He was instrumental in the final where he marked Kieran Donaghy and kept him scoreless, and in fact outscored him when he scored a great 50-metre point.

McCusker has been appointed Derry vice-captain for the 2009 season.

=== Club ===
McCusker has been on the Ballinderry senior team since he was 17. In 1998 McCusker was part of the Ballinderry team that won the All-Ireland Kilmacud Crokes Sevens Championship. After losing two finals in a row to Bellaghy in 1999 and 2000, Ballinderry won the 2001 Derry Senior Championship defeating Bellaghy in the decider. The club went on to win the 2001 Ulster Club Championship with victories over St. Gall's, Cavan Gaels and Mayobridge. Ballinderry went on to represent Ulster in the All-Ireland Senior Club Football Championship, which they won defeating Tír Chonaill Gaels (London) in the quarter-final, Rathnew (Wicklow) in the semi-final and Nemo Rangers (Cork) in the final. McCusker played a great game in that final, marking Nemo's main scoring threat Colin Corkery.

Ballinderry defended the Derry Championship in 2002, but lost in the semi-final stage of the Ulster Club Championship to Errigal Ciarán. McCusker was once again runner-up in the Derry Championship in 2003, losing to An Lúb in the final. He gained his third Derry Championship medal with the club in 2006. Ballinderry once again reached the Ulster Club final, but lost narrowly to Crossmaglen Rangers. For the 2007 season McCusker was captain of Ballinderry. In 2008 McCusker and Ballinderry won the Ulster Senior Club Football League and the Derry Championship again, and again were runners-up in the Ulster Senior Club Championship.

== Honours ==
=== Inter-county ===
- National Football League:
  - Winner (2): 2000, 2008
- Dr McKenna Cup:
  - Runner up: 2005, 2008, more?

=== Club ===
- All-Ireland Senior Club Football Championship:
  - Winner (1): 2002
- All-Ireland Kilmacud Crokes Sevens Championship:
  - Winner (1): 1998
  - Runner up:? 1999?
- Ulster Senior Club Football Championship:
  - Winner (1): 2001
  - Runner up: 2006, 2008
- Ulster Senior Club Football League:
  - Winner (1): 2008
- Derry Senior Football Championship:
  - Winner (4): 2001, 2002, 2006, 2008
  - Runner up: 1999, 2000, 2003
- Derry Senior Football League:
  - Winner (4?/5?/6?): 1996?, 1997?, 2005, 2006, 2007, 2008
- Numerous underage competitions

=== Province ===
- Railway Cup:
  - Winner (at least 1):' 200x

=== Individual ===
- Ballinderry Senior football captain: 2007

Note: The above lists may be incomplete. Please add any other honours you know of.
