= 1998–99 All-Ireland Senior Club Football Championship =

Irish Football Championship

- Dates: 4 October 1998 – 17 March 1999
- Teams: 33
- Sponsor: Allied Irish Bank
- Champions: Crossmaglen Rangers (2nd title); John McEntee (captain); Joe Kernan (manager)
- Runners-up: Ballina Stephenites; Brian Heffernan (captain); Noel O'Dowd (manager)

Tournament statistics
- Matches played: 39
- Top scorer(s): Oisín McConville (1-31)

The 1998–99 All-Ireland Senior Club Football Championship was the 29th staging of the All-Ireland Senior Club Football Championship since its establishment by the Gaelic Athletic Association in 1970-71. The championship began on 4 October 1998 and ended on 17 March 1999.

Corofin entered the championship as the defending champions, however, they were beaten by Ballina Stephenites in the Ulster Club Championship.

On 17 March 1999, Crossmaglen Rangers won the championship following a 0-09 to 0-08 defeat of Ballina Stephenites in the All-Ireland final at Croke Park. It was their second championship title overall and their first title since 1997.

Crossmaglen's Oisín McConville was the championship's top scorer with 1-31.

== Connacht ==
=== Quarter-finals ===
21 November 1998 Quarter-final	Ballina Stephenites	0-09 - 1-06	Corofin	James Stephens Park
	B McStay 0-2, M McGrath 0-2, K Lynn 0-2, L McHale 0-1, D Brady 0-1, P McGarry 0-1.		D Reilly 0-6, M Donnellan 1-0.

22 November 1998 Quarter-final replay	Ballina Stephenites	0-11 - 0-09	Corofin	James Stephens Park
	B McStay 0-5, M McGrath 0-4, G Brady 0-1, K Lane 0-1.		D Reilly 0-6, T Burke 0-2, K Treacy 0-1.

=== Semi-finals ===
8 November 11998 Semi-final	Roscommon Gaels	0-11 - 0-07	Melvin Gaels	Dr Hyde Park
	A Nolan 0-4, F O'Donnell 0-2, R Shannon 0-2, C Heneghan 0-1, L McNeill 0-1, J Comiskey 0-1.		L Gilmartin 0-4, G Foley 0-2, M McCarron 0-1.

6 December 1998 Semi-final	Eastern Harps	0-10 - 0-11	Ballina Stephenites	Markievicz Park
	P Taylor 0-6, R Hannon 0-3, K Canty 0-1.		G Brady 0-2, B McStay 0-2, D Barrett 0-2, M McGrath 0-2, L McHale 0-1, D Bardy 0-1, D Coen 0-1.

=== Final ===
13 December 1998 Final	Ballina Stephenites	1-10 - 0-06	Roscommon Gaels	James Stephens Park
	M McGrath 0-5, P McGarry 1-0, L McHale 0-1, L Bardy 0-1, D Coen 0-1, C Deasy 0-1, B McStay 0-1.		A Nolan 0-5, G Kelly 0-1.

== Leinster ==
=== First round ===
24 October 1998 First round	Fethard	1-04 - 0-08	Athlone	Bellefield Road
	P Rice 1-0, P Turbrett 0-3, J Byrne 0-1.		S Garahy 0-4, N Dolan 0-2, T Stuart-Traynor 0-1, J Fallon 0-1.

25 October 1998 First round	Éire Óg	0-12 - 1-07	Rathnew	Dr. Cullen Park
	P Kingston 0-4, B Carbery 0-3, J Morrissey 0-2, J Hayden 0-1, L Turley 0-1, JJ Eyre 0-1.		T Doyle 1-0, D Coffey 0-3, R Coffey 0-2, P Doyle 0-1, M Doyle 0-1.

25 October 1998 First round	Fr Manning Gaels	0-09 - 2-03	Rhode	Pearse Park
	P Davis 0-6, M Mulleady 0-1, J Breslin 0-1, C Hanniffy 0-1.		D Gorman 1-1, R Malone 1-0, P Keelaghan 0-1, E Byrne 0-1.

25 October 1998 First round	Kilmacud Crokes	1-16 - 0-05	James Stephens	Páirc de Búrca
	M O'Keeffe 0-7, P Burke 1-3, J Costello 0-2, P Ward 0-2, G Duffy 0-1, R Cosgrove 0-1.		L O'Connor 0-1, T O'Dowd 0-1, D Fitzpatrick 0-1, P Barry 0-1, B Leahy 0-1.

31 October 1998 First round replay	Rhode	0-06 - 0-09	Fr Manning Gaels	O'Connor Park
	P Kellaghan 0-2, P Daly 0-2, R Malone 0-1, E Byrne 0-1.		P Davis 0-5, D Hanniffy 0-1, J Tully 0-1, J Breslin 0-1, S Gallagher 0-1.

=== Quarter-finals ===
7 November 1998 Quarter-final	St Peter's Dunboyne	1-09 - 2-07	Kilmacud Crokes	Páirc Tailteann
	B Reilly 1-0, A McEntee 0-3, K Gannon 0-2, G McGovern 0-1, D Gallagher 0-1, N Crawford 0-1, T Byrne 0-1.		R Cosgrove 1-2, P Ward 1-0, R Brennan 0-1, M O'Keeffe 0-1, M Dillon 0-1, P Burke 0-1, J Costello 0-1.

8 November 1998 Quarter-final	Clan na nGael	0-09 - 1-14	Éire Óg	Dundalk
	C O'Hanlon 0-2, D Staunton 0-2, S Dixon 0-1, S O'Hanlon 0-1, P McEnaney 0-1, B O'Connor 0-1.		L Turley 0-5, G Ware 0-4, B Carbery 0-4, B Hennessy 1-0, B Hayden 0-1.

14 November 1998 Quarter-final	Fr Manning Gaels	0-13 - 0-10	Clane	Pearse Park
	P Davis 0-7, J Breslin 0-3, M Mulleady 0-1, C Hanniffy 0-1, D Hanniffy 0-1.		M Lynch 0-5, P McCormack 0-2, P McLoughlin 0-2, B O'Donovan 0-1.

14 November 1998 Quarter-final	Athlone	0-10 - 1-08	Stradbally	Páirc Chiaráin
	N Dolan 0-4, J Fallon 0-4, P Allen 0-1, A Collins 0-1.		G Ramsbottom 0-5, J Kavanagh 1-0, T Bowe 0-2, D Delaney 0-1.

=== Semi-finals ===
22 November 1998 Semi-final	Éire Óg	1-07 - 0-09	Fr Manning Gaels	O'Connor Park
	L Turley 1-2, J Morrissey 0-2, A Keating 0-1, W Quinlan 0-1, G Ware 0-1.		P Davis 0-6, M Muleady 0-1, J Tully 0-1, C Hanniffy 0-1.

22 November 1998 Semi-final	Kilmacud Crokes	1-10 - 1-07	Stradbally	O'Connor Park
	R Cosgrove 1-4, M O'Keeffe 0-2, P Ward 0-1, M Dillon 0-1, R Leahy 0-1, M Leahy 0-1.		G Kavanagh 1-0, G Ramsbottom 0-3, D Delaney 0-2, T Bowe 0-1, T Maher 0-1.

=== Final ===
6 December 1998 Final	Éire Óg	1-06 - 0-09	Kilmacud Crokes	St Conleth's Park
	J Morrissey 1-0, B Carmody 0-3, L turley 0-1, G Ware 0-1, A Keating 0-1.		M O'Keeffe 0-4, P Ward 0-3, P Burke 0-1, M Leahy 0-1.

13 December 1998 Final replay	Éire Óg	0-07 - 0-07	Kilmacud Crokes	O'Connor Park
	L Turley 0-3, J Hayden 0-1, K Haughney 0-1, P Kingston 0-1, A Keating 0-1.		R Cosgrove 0-5, P Burke 0-1, J Costello 0-1.

31 January 1999 Final second replay	Éire Óg	1-11 - 0-11	Kilmacud Crokes	St Conleth's Park
	W Quinlan 1-1, A Keating 0-4, J Morrissey 0-3, B Carbery 0-2, L Turley 0-1.		R Brennan 0-3, M O'Keeffe 0-3, J Costello 0-2, C Deegan 0-1, J McGee 0-1, R Cosgrove 0-1.

== Munster ==
=== Quarter-finals ===
18 October 1998 Quarter-final	Bantry Blues	0-14 - 0-07	Laune Rangers	Wolfe Tone Park
	P Clifford 0-3, P O'Riordan 0-2, D O'Shea 0-2, G Canty 0-2, M Moran 0-2, S McCarthy 0-1, D O'Neill 0-1, E Sheehan 0-1.		MF Russell 0-3, B O'Shea 0-1, L Hassett 0-1, M Hasssett 0-1, J Lynch 0-1.

25 October 1998 Quarter-final	University of Limerick	2-15 - 1-08	St Saviour's	FitzGerald Park, Kilmallock
	J McCarthy 1-4, R O'Rahilly 1-3, J Daly 0-2, C Daly 0-2, D O'Driscoll 0-2, A Mac Gearailt 0-1, D O'Sullivan 0-1.		B Arrigan 1-1, T Corcoran 0-4, D Wyse 0-2, P Corcoran 0-1.

=== Semi-finals ===
22 November 1998 Semi-final	Bantry Blues	0-07 - 1-07	Moyle Rovers	Sam Maguire Park
	D O'Shea 0-2, J Canty 0-2, P Clifford 0-2, S McCarthy 0-1.		D Browne 0-6, Donal Foley 1-0, S McGrath 0-1.

28 November 1998 Semi-final	University of Limerick	0-09 - 1-09	Doonbeg	FitzGerald Park, Kilmallock
	A Mac Gearailt 0-2, D O'Sullivan 0-1, J Daly 0-1, J McCarthy 0-1, D Lyons 0-1, M O'Sullivan 0-1, G McGrath 0-1, J Sugrue 0-1.		G Killeen 1-0, P Hehir 0-3, S Hehir 0-3, B Shanahan 0-1, B Lynch 0-1, D Conway 0-1.

=== Final ===
13 December 1998 Final	Doonbeg	1-08 - 2-05	Moyle Rovers	Gaelic Grounds
	F McInerney 1-1, S Hehir 0-3, P Hehir 0-2, B Shanahan 0-2.		D Browne 1-3, N Lane 1-0, Donal Foley 0-1, Derry Foley 0-1.

20 December 1998 Final replay	Doonbeg	0-07 - 0-04	Moyle Rovers	Gaelic Grounds
	P Hehir 0-2, K Nugent 0-2, B Shanahan 0-2, G Killeen 0-1.		D Browne 0-2, J Shanahan 0-1, J Williams 0-1.

== Ulster ==
=== Preliminary round ===
4 October 1998 Preliminary round	Bellaghy	2-14 - 1-08	Castlblayney Faughs	Dean McGlinchey Park
	C Scullion 2-2, G Diamond 0-6, J Cassidy 0-4, B Lee 0-1, D Cassidy 0-1.		P McDonald 1-3, M O'Connor 0-3, A Tavey 0-1.

=== Quarter-finals ===
4 October 1998 Quarter-final	Enniskillen Gaels	0-10 - 1-05	Rostrevor	Brewster Park
	T Brewster 0-7, A Burns 0-1, R Judge 0-1, P Brewster 0-1.		S Caulfield 1-1, C Daly 0-2, A Cole 0-1, A Farrell 0-1.

4 October 1998 Quarter-final	Ardboe O'Donovan Rossa	1-07 - 1-07	St John's	Plunkett Park
	F McGuigan 0-5, A Quinn 1-0, B McGuigan 0-1, P McElroy 0-1.		E McAtamney 0-4, C Heatley 1-0, P Curran 0-1, A McGowan 0-1, B Mackin 0-1.

4 October 1998 Quarter-final	Crossmaglen Rangers	0-11 - 1-08	Mullahoran	Oliver Plunkett Park
	A Cunningham 0-4, O McConville 0-4, J McEntee 0-2, J McConville 0-1.		D Brady 1-2, D Gannon 0-2, E Reilly 0-2, C Brady 0-1, P Brady 0-1.

11 October 1998 Quarter-final	Aodh Rua	1-07 - 0-13	Bellaghy	Fr Tierney Park
	M Ward 1-1, V Murray 0-2, B Ward 0-1, J Duffy 0-1, C O'Donnell 0-1, D Conlon 0-1.		G Diamond 0-4, E Cassidy 0-2, B Lee 0-2, D Quinn 0-2, J Cassidy 0-1, P Diamond 0-1, D Cassidy 0-1.

11 October 1998 Quarter-final replay	St John's	2-08 - 1-05	Ardboe O'Donovan Rossa	Corrigan Park
	E McAtamney 1-5, B Macken 1-0, D Kennedy 0-2, J Wilson 0-1.		G Wylie 1-0, F McGuigan 0-3, P McElroy 0-1, A Quinn 0-1.

11 October 1998 Quarter-final replay	Mullahoran	0-08 - 2-08	Crossmaglen Rangers	Breffni Park
	D Bardy 0-4, S Brady 0-1, E Reilly 0-1, D Gannon 0-1, M Fagan 0-1.		J McConville 2-0, J McEntee 0-4, A Cunningham 0-1, O McEntee 0-1, C Short 0-1, O McConville 0-1.

=== Semi-finals ===
8 November 1998 Semi-final	Bellaghy	0-12 - 0-09	Ennisillen Gaels	Healy Park
	B Lee 0-3, J Cassidy 0-2, C Scullion 0-2, G Diamond 0-2, D Cassidy 0-1, D Quinn 0-1, E Cassidy 0-1.		T Brewster 0-4, R McCabe 0-2, S Bradley 0-1, C Bradley 0-1, P Brewster 0-1.

8 November 1998 Semi-final	Crossmaglen Rangers	3-10 - 0-11	St John's	St Tiernach's Park
	C Shortt 1-2, O McConville 0-5, M Moley 1-1, J McConville 1-0, F Shields 0-1, A Cunningham 0-1.		E McAtamney 0-4, G Adams 0-2, E McKenna 0-1, G Heaney 0-1, C McKnight 0-1, J Wilson 0-1, P Nolan 0-1.

=== Final ===
22 November 1998 Final	Crossmaglen Rangers	1-11 - 1-10	Bellaghy	St Tiernach's Park
	O McConville 1-1, J McEntee 0-3, A Cunningham 0-3, C Short 0-2, G Comiskey 0-1, M Moley 0-1.		G Diamond 0-5, C Scullion 1-0, D Cassidy 0-2, J Cassidy 0-1, D Quinn 0-1, C McNally 0-1.

== Quarter-final ==
13 December 1998 Quarter-final	Tír Chonaill Gaels	0-08 - 1-18	Crossmaglen Rangers	Emerald GAA Grounds
	T Maguire 0-4, P Coggins 0-1, J Grimes 0-1, M Somers 0-1, K Hickey 0-1.		O McConville 0-9, A Cunningham 1-1, T McEntee 0-2, J McConville 0-2, C Short 0-2, G Cummiskey 0-1, J Fitzpatrick 0-1.

== Semi-finals ==
21 February 1999 Semi-final	Crossmaglen Rangers	1-10 - 1-05	Éire Óg	Páirc Tailteann
	O McConville 0-5, J McEntee 1-1, A Cunningham 0-4.		L Turley 1-0, J Hayden 0-2, W Quinlan 0-1, T Nolan 0-1, B Carbery 0-1.

21 February 1999 Semi-final	Ballina Stephenites	0-08 - 0-04	Doonbeg	Dunlo GAA Grounds
	P McGarry 0-2, B McStay 0-1, S Sweeney 0-1, D Coen 0-1, K Lynn 0-1, M McGrath 0-1, D Brady 0-1.		P Hehir 0-2, P Gallagher 0-1, G Killeen 0-1.

== Final ==
17 March 1999 Final	Crossmaglen Rangers	0-09 - 0-08	Ballina Stephenites	Croke Park
	O McConville 0-6, G Cummiskey 0-1, J McConville 0-1, J McEntee 0-1.		B McStay 0-1, M McGrath 0-1, D Coen 0-1, P McGarry 0-1, L McHale 0-1, D Brady 0-1, G Brady 0-1, C Deacy 0-1.

== Statistics ==
=== Top scorers ===
Overall

Rank	Player	Club	Tally	Total	Matches	Average
1	Oisín McConville	Crossmaglen Rangers	1-31	34	7	4.85
2	Pádraic Davis	Fr Manning Gaels	0-24	24	4	6.00
3	Ray Cosgrove	Kilmacud Crokes	2-13	19	6	3.16
3	Leo Turley	Éire Óg	2-13	19	7	2.71
4	Anthony Cunningham	Crossmaglen Rangers	1-14	17	7	2.42
4	Gavin Diamond	Bellaghy	0-17	17	4	4.25
4	Mick O'Keeffe	Kilmacud Crokes	0-17	17	6	2.83
5	Enda McAtamney	St John's	1-13	16	3	5.33
6	Martin McGrath	Ballina Staphenites	0-15	15	5	2.50
7	Declan Browne	Moyle Rovers	1-11	14	3	4.66
7	John McEntee	Crossmaglen Rangers	1-11	14	7	2.00

In a single game

Rank	Player	Club	Tally	Total	Opposition
1	Oisín McConville	Crossmaglen Rangers	0-09	9	Tír Chonaill Gaels
2	Cathal Scullion	Bellaghy	2-02	8	Castleblayney Faughs
2	Enda McAtamney	St John's	1-05	8	Ardboe O'Donovan Rossa
3	Jonathan McCarthy	University of Limerick	1-04	7	St Saviour's
3	Ray Cosgrove	Kilmacud Crokes	1-04	7	Stradbally
3	Mick O'Keeffe	Kilmacud Crokes	0-07	7	James Stephens
3	Pádraic Davis	Fr Manning Gaels	0-07	7	Clane
3	Tom Brewster	Enniskillen Gaels	0-07	7	Rostrevor

=== Miscellaneous ===
- Doonbeg became the first team from Clare to win the Munster Club Championship.
- Ballina Stephenites won the Connacht Club Championship title for the first time in their history.
