= James Conway (Gaelic footballer) =

Derry Gaelic footballer

Personal information
- Native name: Séamas Ó Conbhuí (Irish)
- Born: 31 March 1981 (age 45) Ballinderry, County Londonderry, Northern Ireland
- Occupation: Plasterer
- Height: 6 ft 3 in (191 cm)

Sport
- Sport: Gaelic football
- Position: Midfield
Club
- Years: Club
- 199x–present: Ballinderry
Club titles
- Derry titles: 4
- Ulster titles: 1
- All-Ireland Titles: 1
Inter-county
Years	County	Apps (scores)
200x–present	Derry	?
Inter-county titles
- NFL: 1

James Conway (born 31 March 1981) is a Gaelic footballer who plays for the Derry county team, with whom he has won a National League title. He plays his club football for Ballinderry Shamrocks. He was part of the Ballinderry team that won the 2002 All-Ireland Senior Club Football Championship, and he has also won four Derry Championships and an Ulster Senior Club Football Championship with the club. For club and county he plays in midfield.

== Playing career ==
=== Inter-county ===
He was first called up to the Derry Senior panel by then-manager Eamonn Coleman in late 2000 ahead of the 2000–2001 National Football League. He was instrumental in Derry winning the 2008 National League, where Derry beat Kerry in the final. He however could not play in the final due to a work related injury.

=== Club ===
Conway struggled to make both the Ballinderry and school (St Pat's, Maghera) team at underage level, even being forced to play as goalkeeper as a couple of seasons around Under 16 level for Ballinderry. He however made the Ballinderry senior panel when he was 17. He won his first Derry Senior Football Championship in 2001 and Ballinderry went on to win that year's Ulster Senior Club Football Championship, and the All-Ireland Senior Club Football Championship the following March. He has won further Derry Championship medals with the club in 2002, 2006 and 2008.

== Honours ==
=== Inter-county ===
- National Football League:
  - Winner (1): 2008
- Dr McKenna Cup:
  - Winner (1): 2011

=== Club ===
- All-Ireland Senior Club Football Championship:
  - Winner (1): 2002
- Ulster Senior Club Football Championship:
  - Winner (1): 2001
  - Runner up: 2006, 2008
- Ulster Senior Club Football League:
  - Winner (1): 2008
- Derry Senior Football Championship:
  - Winner (4): 2001, 2002, 2006, 2008
  - Runner up: 1999?, 2000?, 2003
- Derry Senior Football League:
  - Winner (at least 4): 2005, 2006, 2007, 2008
- Numerous underage competitions

Note: The above lists may be incomplete. Please add any other honours you know of.
