= 2009 Ulster Senior Club Football Championship =

Tournament details
- County: Ulster
- Year: 2009

The 2009 Ulster Senior Club Football Championship was the 42nd staging of the annual Ulster Senior Club Football Championship which is administered by Ulster GAA. Nine GAA county boards compete for the title. The winners were awarded the Séamus McFerran Cup and went on to compete in the 2010 All-Ireland Senior Club Football Championship. The championship started on 18 October 2009 and concluded with the final on 29 November 2009.

Crossmaglen were the current holders – beating Ballinderry in the 2008 final at Brewster Park in Enniskillen, County Fermanagh.

== Format ==
The championship took the structure of an open-draw knock-out.

== Competing teams ==
Each county in Ulster holds its own County Championship. The winner of the nine championships qualify for the Ulster Club Championship.

Team	Qualified as	Last appearance	Notes
St Gall's	Antrim Champions	2008	
Pearse Óg	Armagh Champions	1992	Knocked out at the quarter final stage by St Galls of Antrim.
Cavan Gaels	Cavan Champions	2008	Knocked out in the first round by St Galls of Antrim.
An Lúb	Derry Champions	2003	
St Eunan's	Donegal Champions	2008	
Derrygonnelly Harps	Fermanagh Champions	2004	Knocked out at the quarter final stage by An Lúb of Derry.
Clontibret O'Neills	Monaghan Champions	2007	
Dromore	Tyrone Champions	2007	Knocked out at the quarter final stage by Clontibret of Monaghan.
Kilcoo	Down Champions	First Club Championship	

== Draw ==
The draw for the (whole) competition took place in August 2009, along with the draws for the Ulster Senior Hurling, Intermediate Football and Junior Football championships.

== Match schedule ==
- Preliminary round – 18 October
- Quarter-finals – 1 November
- Semi-finals – 15 November
- Final – 29 November

== Preliminary round ==
18 October 2009	Cavan Gaels (Cavan)	1–10 – 1–12 (a.e.t.)	St Gall's (Antrim)	Kingspan Breffni Park; Referee: Marty Duffy (Sligo)
18 October 2009		BBC report		Kingspan Breffni Park; Referee: Marty Duffy (Sligo)

== Quarter-finals ==
The quarter-finals were originally schedules to take place on 1 November, but they were all postponed for a week due to adverse weather conditions.

8 November 2009	An Lúb (Derry)	1–10 – 1–06	Derrygonnelly Harps (Fermanagh)	Celtic Park, Derry
8 November 2009		BBC report		Celtic Park, Derry

8 November 2009	Kilcoo (Down)	0–13 – 0–09	St Eunan's (Donegal)	Páirc Esler, Newry
8 November 2009		BBC report		Páirc Esler, Newry

8 November 2009	Clontibret O'Neills (Monaghan)	0–10 – 0–08	Dromore (Tyrone)	St Tiernach's Park, Clones
8 November 2009		BBC report		St Tiernach's Park, Clones

8 November 2009	Pearse Óg (Armagh)	0–08 – 0–10	St Gall's (Antrim)	Casement Park, Belfast
8 November 2009		BBC report		Casement Park, Belfast

== Semi-finals ==
15 November 2009	An Lúb (Derry)	1–12 – 1–11	Kilcoo (Down)	Casement Park, Belfast
15 November 2009		BBC report		Casement Park, Belfast

15 November 2009	Clontibret O'Neills (Monaghan)	0–11 – 2–15	St Gall's (Antrim)	Athletic Grounds, Armagh
15 November 2009		BBC Report		Athletic Grounds, Armagh

== Final ==
29 November 2009; 1430 GMT	An Lúb (Derry)	0–05 – 0–16	St Gall's (Antrim)	Páirc Esler, Newry
29 November 2009; 1430 GMT		BBC Report		Páirc Esler, Newry
