= John McEntee (Gaelic footballer) =

Armagh Gaelic footballer (born 1977)

Personal information
- Born: 30 June 1977 (age 49) Crossmaglen, County Armagh
- Height: 6 ft 0 in (183 cm)

Sport
- Sport: Gaelic football
- Position: Centre half forward
Club
- Years: Club
- 1995–2011: Crossmaglen
Club titles
- Armagh titles: 14
- Ulster titles: 8
- All-Ireland Titles: 5
Inter-county
- Years: County
- xxxx–2007: Armagh
Inter-county titles
- Ulster titles: 6
- All-Irelands: 1
- NFL: 1

John McEntee is a former Gaelic footballer who played at senior level for the Armagh county team until 2007. He was part of the 2002 All-Ireland Senior Football Championship-winning team. McEntee also won six Ulster Senior Football Championships and a National Football League title with the county.

McEntee played club football for Crossmaglen Rangers and had a highly successful career with the club. He helped Cross win the All-Ireland Senior Club Football Championship four times, the Ulster Senior Club Football Championship seven times and the Armagh Senior Football Championship on 13 occasions.

He usually played as a centre half forward. McEntee is known as one of the Armagh's best ever footballers.

== Personal life ==
McEntee is from Crossmaglen, County Armagh. His twin brother Tony played alongside him for all of his Crossmaglen and Armagh career.

== Playing career ==
=== Club ===
McEntee was part of the Crossmaglen team that has won 13 Armagh Senior Football Championships in a row between 1996 and 2008. This equals the national record for consecutive county football championships set by Ballina Stephenites of Mayo between 1904 and 1916. He has also won the Ulster Senior Club Football Championship seven times (1996, 1998, 1999, 2004, 2006, 2007, 2008) and 2010 and the All-Ireland Senior Club Football Championship five times (1997, 1999, 2000, 2007 and 2011) with the club. McEntee, along with twin brother Tony, Oisín McConville, Paul Hearty, Francie Bellew and Cathal Short is one of six Cross players to have shared in all these successes since 1996. John came on as a sub in the 2011 All-Ireland Club final that was his last game for Cross.

=== Inter-county ===
McEntee made his inter-county senior debut for Armagh against Louth. He was noted for establishing himself in the central midfield/half-forward berth around the 2000 season, with his former manager Joe Kernan praising the "telepathic understanding" he shared with his twin brother, Tony McEntee, on the field. His contribution to the 2002 All-Ireland final victory included scoring a crucial point in the historic win over Kerry.
