= Kevin McGuckin =

Irish Gaelic footballer

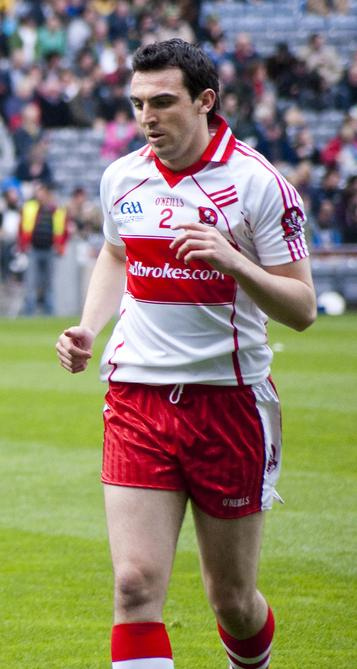

Personal information
- Nickname: Slith
- Born: 21 February 1981 (age 45) Ballinderry, County Londonderry, Northern Ireland
- Occupation: Chartered Accountant
- Height: 6 ft 2 in (188 cm)

Sport
- Sport: Gaelic football
- Position: Defender
Club
- Years: Club
- Ballinderry Shamrocks
Club titles
- Derry titles: 6
- Ulster titles: 1
- All-Ireland Titles: 1
Inter-county
- Years: County
- 2002–2012: Derry
Inter-county titles
- NFL: 1

Kevin "Slith" McGuckin (born 21 February 1981) is a Gaelic footballer who plays for the Derry county team, with whom he has won a National League title. McGuckin was captain of the Derry team for 2007 and is currently the vice-captain.

McGuckin plays his club football for Ballinderry Shamrocks. He was part of the Ballinderry team that won the 2002 All-Ireland Senior Club Football Championship, and he has also won four Derry Championships and an Ulster Senior Club Football Championship with the club.

== Playing career ==
=== Inter-county ===
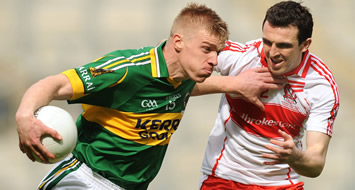
McGuckin (right) in action against Kerry's Tommy Walsh in the 2009 National League final

McGuckin made his Championship debut against Donegal in the 2002 Ulster Championship semi-final. He was named Derry captain for 2007, but missed most of the season after breaking his leg in a National League against Louth in April of that year. He returned to come on as a substitute against Laois and started against Dublin in the All-Ireland quarter-final.

He was instrumental in the 2008 National League, which Derry won, defeating Kerry in the final. McGuckin and Derry also reached the National League final in 2009, but were defeated by Kerry.

=== Club ===
McGuckin lead Ballinderry Shamrocks to victory in October 2011 when he captained the side to their 11th County Derry title.

McGuckin won his first Derry Senior Football Championship in 2001 and Ballinderry went on to win that year's Ulster Senior Club Football Championship, and the All-Ireland Senior Club Football Championship the following March. He has won further Derry Championship medals with the club in 2002, 2006, 2008 and 2012.

=== Province ===
McGuckin has been selected to play for Ulster and won a Railway Cup medal with the province in 2004. He was also part of the team that finished runners-up to Leinster in the 2005 Railway Cup final.

== Honours ==
=== Inter-county ===
- National Football League:
  - Winner (1): 2008
  - Runner up: 2009
- Dr McKenna Cup:
  - Runner up: 2005, 2008, 2011
  - Ulster Senior Football Championship:
  - Winner (0)
  - Runner Up (1) 2011

=== Club ===
- All-Ireland Senior Club Football Championship:
  - Winner (1): 2002
- All-Ireland Kilmacud Crokes Sevens Championship:
  - Winner (1): 1998??
  - Runner up: 1999??
- Ulster Senior Club Football Championship:
  - Winner (1): 2001
  - Runner up: 2006, 2008
- Ulster Senior Club Football League:
  - Winner (1): 2008
- Derry Senior Football Championship:
  - Winner (6): 2001, 2002, 2006, 2008, 2011 (c), 2012
  - Runner up: 1999??, 2000, 2003
- Derry Senior Football League:
  - Winner (4): 2005, 2006, 2007, 2008, 2011 C
- Numerous underage competitions

=== Province ===
- Railway Cup:
  - Winner (1):' 2004
  - Runner up: 2005

=== Individual ===
- Derry Senior football captain: 2007

Note: The above lists may be incomplete. Please add any other honours you know of.

Gaelic games
| Preceded by Johnny McBride | Derry senior football captain 2007 | Succeeded by Kevin McCloy |
