= Ulster Senior League =

This is a disambiguation page. The Ulster Senior League may refer to:

- Ulster Senior League (association football)
- Ulster Senior League (men's hockey)
- Ulster Senior League (rugby union)
- Ulster Senior Club Football League - Gaelic football
- Ulster Senior Club Hurling League
