= Derrycrin =

Village in County Tyrone, Northern Ireland

Coordinates: 54°39′12″N 6°33′39″W

Derrycrin or Derrychrin (perhaps from Irish Doire Críon, meaning 'withered oak-grove'), is a small village in County Tyrone, Northern Ireland. It is part of the parish of Ballinderry and is near the western shore of Lough Neagh. The Ballinderry River is a short distance north of the village and marks the boundary between counties Tyrone and Londonderry.

== Education ==
Derrycrin Primary is the local Catholic primary school which caters to children aged four to 11.

Nearby secondary schools include:

- St. Mary's, Magherafelt
- Rainey Endowed, Magherafelt
- St Pius', Magherafelt
- Sperrin Integrated, Magherafelt
- Holy Trinity, Cookstown
- Cookstown High School
- Magherafelt High School

== Sport ==
Gaelic football and camogie are the biggest sports in Derrycrin and Ballinderry. The local GAA club is the Ballinderry Shamrocks.

== See also ==
- Derrycrin (Conyngham)
- Derrycrin (Eglish)
