= Ballylifford =

Townland in County Londonderry, Northern Ireland

- Townland
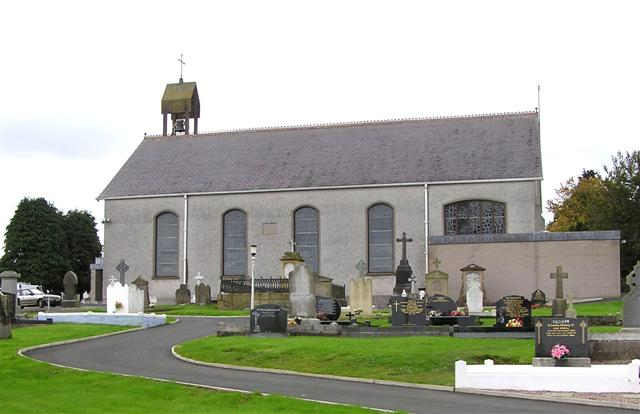
- Ballylifford Roman Catholic Church in 2006

- Location within Northern Ireland
- Coordinates: 54.667°N 6.555°W
- Country: United Kingdom
- Province: Northern Ireland
- County: Londonderry

Ballylifford (from Irish Baile Leithearr 'townland of the short turn') is a townland in County Londonderry, Northern Ireland. It is within the civil parish of Ballinderry, on the western shores of Lough Neagh, and is part of Mid-Ulster District. Many of the houses in the area have been built along Ballinderry Bridge Road.

A notable person from the parish is IRA Brigadier-Commandant Sean Larkin, who fought on the anti-Treaty side in the Irish Civil War and was one of those executed at Drumboe Castle on 14 March 1923 by firing squad, ordered by the Free State Government.

== Education ==
The only school in the area, Ballylifford Primary School (formerly Ballylifford National School), is a Catholic primary school for children between the ages of four and 11.

== Sport ==
The local Gaelic Athletic Association club is Ballinderry Shamrocks GAC who have won the Derry Senior Football Championship thirteen times, second only to Bellaghy GAC who have won it 21 times.

== See also ==
- List of townlands in County Londonderry
