= Johnny McBride =

Derry Gaelic footballer

Personal information
- Born: 9 May 1977 (age 49) County Londonderry, Northern Ireland

Sport
- Sport: Gaelic football
- Position: Forward / midfield
Club
- Years: Club
- ?–present: An Lúb
Club titles
- Derry titles: 2
- Ulster titles: 1
Inter-county
- Years: County
- 1995–2006: Derry
Inter-county titles
- Ulster titles: 3
- All-Irelands: 1
- NFL: 2

Johnny McBride (born 9 May 1977) is a Gaelic footballer who played for the Derry county team in the 1990s and 2000s. He won an Ulster Senior Football Championship and two National Leagues with the county, as well as Ulster Minor, Ulster Under 21 and All-Ireland Under-21 Football Championships.

McBride continues to play club football for Naomh Pádraig An Lúb. As captain, he was instrumental in helping An Lúb win the 2003 Ulster Senior Club Football Championship and Derry Championships.

== Playing career ==
=== Inter-county ===
McBride played three years of Minor football for Derry (1993–1995). He reached the Ulster Minor Championship final against Tyrone in 1993, and despite McBride putting in a man of the match display, Derry were defeated. They however won the 1995 Ulster Minor Championship, with McBride as captain and finished runners-up to Westmeath in that year's All-Ireland Minor final. In 1997 he captained Derry when they won the Ulster Under-21 and All-Ireland Under-21 Football Championships, defeating Fermanagh and Meath in the respective finals.

He made his Derry Senior debut in late 1995 (in the 1996 National League) against Kerry. Derry went on to win that year's competition. In 1998, Derry won the Ulster Senior Championship, but lost to Galway in that year's All-Ireland Championship semi-final. In 2000 he won another National League with Derry, defeating Meath in the final. Derry also reached that year's Ulster final, but lost out to Armagh. Derry reached two more All-Ireland semi-finals in 2001 and 2004, but were defeated by Galway and Kerry respectively.

McBride was named Derry captain for the 2006 season, he first An Lúb player to hold the honour. He announced his retirement from inter-county football at the end of the 2006 campaign.

=== Club ===
McBride had a successful underage club career including winning two Derry Minor Championships and two Ulster Minor Club Football Championships in 1993 and 1995, and was captain of the 1995 side. In 2003, he captained the club to their first Derry Senior Football Championship in 67 years, and they also went on to win the Ulster Senior Club Football Championship.

=== School/college ===
McBride won an All-Ireland Colleges title with his school. He captained the University of Ulster Coleraine team in the Sigerson Cup while a student.

== Honours ==
=== County ===
==== Senior ====
- National Football League:
  - Winner (2): 1996, 2000
  - Runner-up: 1998
- Ulster Senior Football Championship:
  - Winner (1): 1998
  - Runner up: 1997, 2000

==== Under-21 ====
- All-Ireland Under-21 Football Championship:
  - Winner (1): 1997
- Ulster Under-21 Football Championship:
  - Winner (1): 1997
  - Runner up: 1996, 1998

==== Minor ====
- All-Ireland Minor Football Championship:
  - Runner up: 1995
- Ulster Minor Football Championship:
  - Winner (1): 1995
  - Runner up: 1993

=== Club ===
- Ulster Senior Club Football Championship:
  - Winner (1): 2003
- Derry Senior Football Championship:
  - Winner (2): 2003, 2009
  - Runner up: 2002, 2005, 2006
- Derry Senior Football League:
  - Winner (1): 2002
- Ulster Minor Club Football Championship:
  - Winner (2): 1993, 1995
- Derry Minor Football Championship:
  - Winner (2): 1993, 1995
- Derry Minor Football League:
  - Winner (2): 1992, 1995
- Other underage awards including Under 14 Derry League, Under 16 Derry League & Championship and Ulster Óg Sport

=== School ===
- Hogan Cup:
  - Winner (1): 1995
- McLarnon Cup:
  - Winner (1): 1994 (Captain)

=== Individual ===
- Derry Senior football captain: 2006

Note: The above lists may be incomplete. Please add any other honours you know of.

Gaelic games
Preceded by Paddy Bradley	Derry senior football captain 2006	Succeeded by Kevin McGuckin
Preceded by Gerard Cassidy (Ballinderry)	Derry Senior Football Championship winning captain 2003	Succeeded by Shane Kelly (Slaughtneil)
