= Conleith Gilligan =

Derry Gaelic footballer

Personal information
- Native name: Conláed Mac Giollagáin (Irish)
- Nickname: Deets
- Born: 17 December 1979 (age 46) Derry, Northern Ireland
- Occupation: Business Development Manager
- Height: 1.75 m (5 ft 9 in)

Sport
- Sport: Gaelic football
- Position: Right corner forward
Club
- Years: Club
- 1996–: Ballinderry Shamrocks
Club titles
- Derry titles: 7
- Ulster titles: 2
- All-Ireland Titles: 1
Inter-county
- Years: County
- 1999–2012: Derry
Inter-county titles
- NFL: 2

Conleith "Deets" Gilligan (born 17 December 1979) is a Gaelic footballer who played for the Derry county team, with whom he won two National League titles.

Gilligan plays his club football for Ballinderry Shamrocks. He was involved in Ballinderry's win in the 2002 All-Ireland Senior Club Football Championship, and he has also won four Derry Championships and an Ulster Senior Club Football Championship with the club.

Gilligan usually plays as a playmaker in the forward line.

== Playing career ==
=== Inter-county ===
Gilligan was a late addition to the Derry panel that won the 2000 National League. He joined the panel after the NFL final against Meath, which finished a draw and came on as a substitute in the final replay.

He was instrumental in the 2008 National League, which Derry won, defeating Kerry in the final.

He announced his retirement from inter-county football in November 2012.

=== Club ===
Gilligan won his first Derry Senior Football Championship in 2001 and Ballinderry went on to win that year's Ulster Senior Club Football Championship, and the All-Ireland Senior Club Football Championship the following March. He has won further Derry Championship medals with the club in 2002, 2006 (as captain) and 2008. He has also won seven Derry Senior League medals with the club (1995, 1996, 1997, 2005, 2006, 2007 and 2008).

== Post-playing career ==
Having assisted Mickey Moran to bring an All Ireland club title to Kilcoo in 2022 He joined the Armagh backroom management team in October 2023, ahead of the 2024 season, and was a key part of the set up that brought the Sam Maguire trophy to Armagh in July 2024 when they defeated Galway by one point.

== Honours ==
=== Inter-county ===
- National Football League:
  - Winner (2): 2000, 2008
- Dr McKenna Cup:
  - Runner up: 2005, more?

=== Club ===
- All-Ireland Senior Club Football Championship:
  - Winner (1): 2002
- All-Ireland Kilmacud Crokes Sevens Championship:
  - Winner (1): 1998
  - Runner up: 1999??
- Ulster Senior Club Football Championship:
  - Winner (1): 2001
  - Runner up: 2006, 2008
- Ulster Senior Club Football League:
  - Winner (1): 2008
- Derry Senior Football Championship:
  - Winner (4): 2001, 2002, 2006, 2008
  - Runner up: 1999, 2000, 2003
- Derry Senior Football League:
  - Winner (7): 1995, 1996, 1997, 2005, 2006, 2007, 2008
- Numerous underage competitions

=== Individual ===
- Derry Senior Football Championship winning captain: 2006

Note: The above lists may be incomplete. Please add any other honours you know of.

Gaelic games
Preceded by Joe Cassidy (Bellaghy)	Derry Senior Football Championship winning captain 2006	Succeeded by Paddy Bradley (Glenullin)
