= Derrycrin (Eglish) =

Townland in County Tyrone, Northern Ireland

Coordinates: 54°39′17″N 6°33′44″W

Derrycrin (Eglish) is a townland in County Tyrone, Northern Ireland. It is situated in the historic barony of Dungannon Upper and the civil parish of Ballinderry and covers an area of 444 acres.

The name derives from the Irish: Doire Críon (withered) or doire chaorthainn (Grove of the mountain ash).

The population of the townland declined during the 19th century:

Year	1841	1851	1861	1871	1881	1891
Population	251	260	251	227	198	174
Houses	53	41	43	38	38	37

== See also ==
- Derrycrin
- Derrycrin (Conyngham)
- List of townlands of County Tyrone
