= Crossmaglen =

Village in County Armagh, Northern Ireland

Coordinates: 54.0773°N 6.6088°W

Crossmaglen: Irish: Crois Mhic Lionnáin; Cross/The Cross
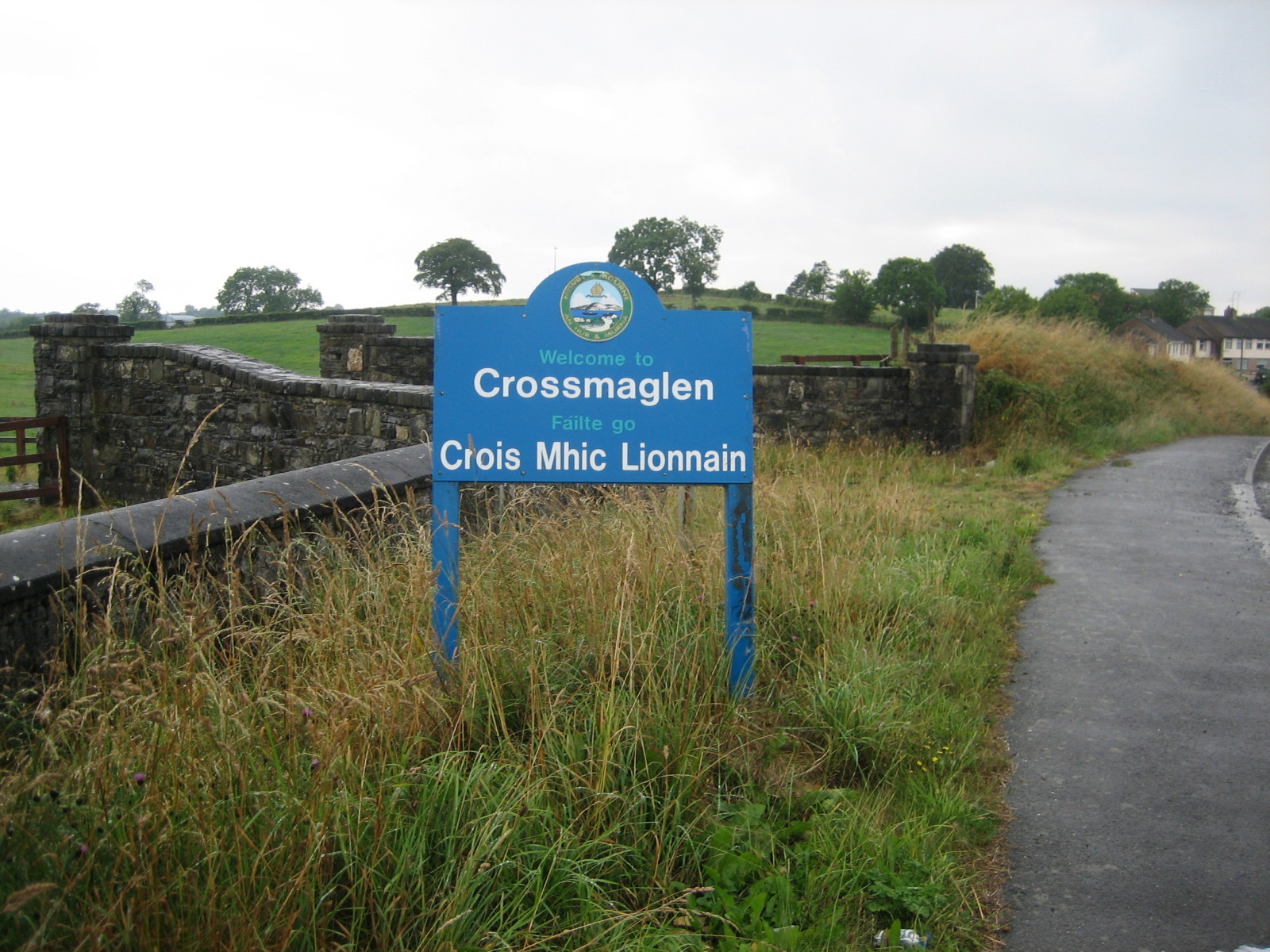
- Road leading into the village

- Location within Northern Ireland
- Population: 1,610 (2011 Census)
- Irish grid reference: H910152
  - Belfast: 52 mi (84 km)
- District: Newry, Mourne and Down
- County: County Armagh
- Country: Northern Ireland
- Sovereign state: United Kingdom
- Post town: NEWRY
- Postcode district: BT35
- Dialling code: 028
- UK Parliament: Newry & Armagh
- NI Assembly: Newry & Armagh

Crossmaglen (from Irish Crois Mhic Lionnáin, meaning 'Mac Lionnáin's cross', IPA: [ˈkɾˠɔʃˈvʲɪcˈlʲɪn̪ˠaːnʲ]) is a village and townland in County Armagh, Northern Ireland. It had a population of 1,610 in the 2011 Census and is the largest village in the south of County Armagh. The village centre is the site of a large Police Service of Northern Ireland base and formerly of an observation tower (known locally as the "look-out post").

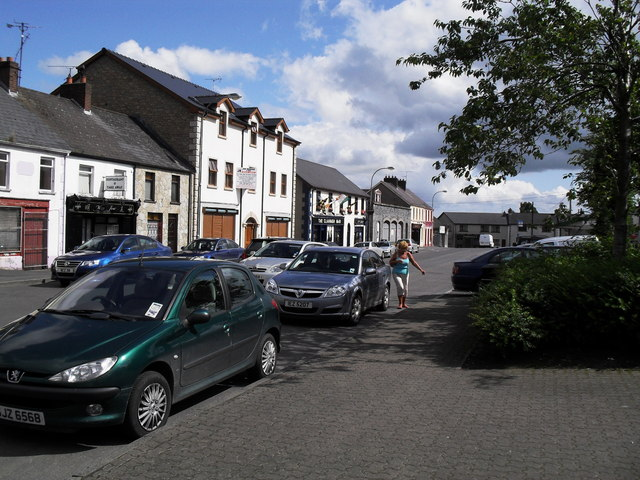
Cardinal Ó Fiach Square, Crossmaglen

The square's name commemorates Cardinal Tomás Ó Fiaich, a local man who became Primate of All Ireland (head of the Catholic Church in Ireland), and who died in 1990. However, the Cardinal originated from Crossmaglen's close neighbour, Cullyhanna. Crossmaglen has its own GAA team, Crossmaglen Rangers GAC.

Travelling by road, Crossmaglen is 61.6 miles (99.1 km) to the north of Dublin, 15.8 miles (25.4 km) to the west of Newry, and 51.6 miles (83.0 km) to the south of Belfast.

== History ==
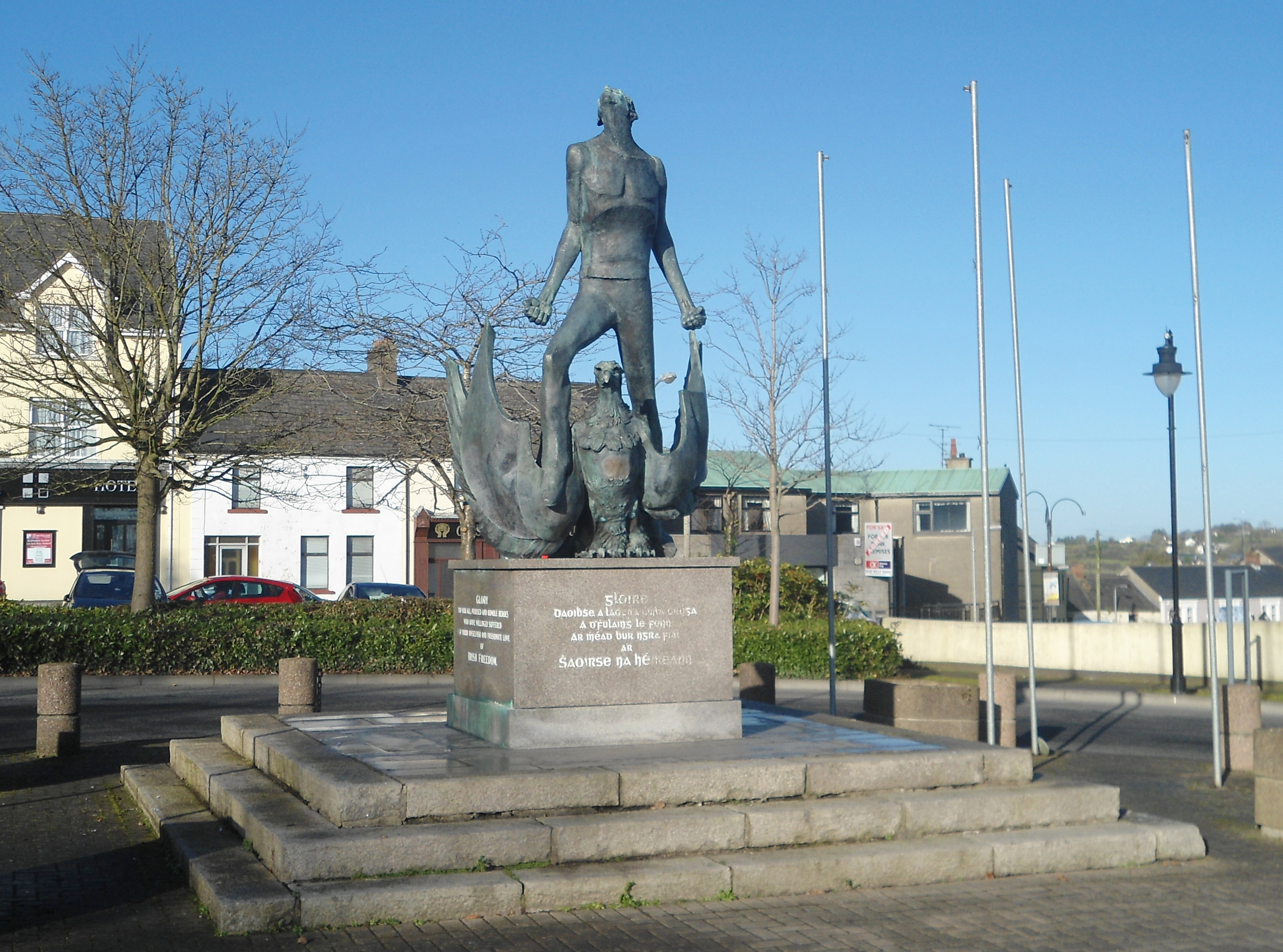
Republican Memorial, Crossmaglen

On 13 January 1921, during the Irish War of Independence, the Irish Republican Army (IRA) shot dead an Ulster Special Constabulary (USC) constable in Crossmaglen. He was the first member of the USC to be killed whilst on duty.

Crossmaglen, along with the rest of South Armagh, would have been transferred to the Irish Free State had the recommendations of the Irish Boundary Commission been enacted in 1925.

=== The Troubles ===
The British Army had a major presence in the area during the Troubles. Crossmaglen and the wider South Armagh/South Down area was a republican stronghold and republican paramilitaries were very active, earning the area the nickname "Bandit Country." Labour Party MP Clare Short said in 1983 "It is ridiculous that British troops are here in Crossmaglen. The claim is that they're in Ireland keeping the peace between the two communities. But there is only one community in South Armagh, so what the heck are they doing here?" During the Troubles, at least 58 police officers and 124 soldiers were killed by the Provisional Irish Republican Army in South Armagh, many in Crossmaglen itself.

== Education ==
- Clonalig Primary School
- St Brigid's Primary School
- St Patrick's Primary School
- Gael Scoil Phadraig Naofa
- St Joseph's High School

== Governance ==
Crossmaglen forms part of the Newry & Armagh constituency for elections to the Westminster Parliament. The Member of Parliament is Dáire Hughes of Sinn Féin. He won the seat at the 2024 United Kingdom general election.

For Local Government purposes it belongs to Newry, Mourne and Down (which was created on 1 April 2015 by merging Newry and Mourne District and Down District).

== Transport ==
Crossmaglen is served by Ulsterbus, route no. 42.

== Gaelic games ==
Crossmaglen in recent years has become known for its Gaelic football team, Crossmaglen Rangers, who won the All-Ireland Senior Club Football Championship in 1997, 1999, 2000, 2007, 2011 and again in 2012. The manager and several players of Rangers went on to win the All-Ireland Senior Football Championship with their county team in 2002 and reached the final again in 2003, only to lose to neighbours Tyrone. One of Crossmaglen's most notable players is Oisín McConville, who is also Ulster's top scoring player. The county team were also in the All-Ireland Senior Football Championship final in 1953; local players Gene Morgan and Frank Kernan were on the team but they were defeated by Kerry. Armagh also made it to the 1977 All-Ireland Senior Football Championship Final, but were beaten by Dublin.

There was an ongoing dispute for years between Crossmaglen Rangers, the Morgan family of Crossmaglen, and the British Army over the positioning of the army base which was placed on the Rangers pitch and on the back garden of the Morgan family home on Cardinal Ó Fiaich Square. This was remedied, beginning in April 1999.

Crossmaglen Rangers hold the national record of 39 county titles, including 13 in a row. They also hold the record of nine Ulster club titles.

== People ==
- Charles Armstrong - Forced disappearance victim
- Francie Bellew - Gaelic footballer
- Gerard Evans - Forced disappearance victim
- Sir Thomas Jackson, 1st Baronet - The third Chief Manager of The Hongkong and Shanghai Banking Corporation (HSBC)
- Cardinal Tomás Ó Fiaich - Primate of All Ireland (head of the Roman Catholic Church in Ireland)
- Aaron Kernan - Gaelic footballer
- Joe Kernan - Gaelic footballer and Manager
- Jim McAllister - Politician, Sinn Féin
- Oisín McConville - Gaelic footballer
- John McEntee - Gaelic footballer
- Edward George Richardson - Member of Parliament for South Armagh, Nationalist Party and Independent Nationalist

== Demographics ==
=== 2001 Census ===
Crossmaglen is classified as a village by the NI Statistics and Research Agency (NISRA) (i.e. with population between 1,000 and 2,250 people). On Census day (29 April 2001) there were 1,459 people living in Crossmaglen. Of these:

- 27.0% were aged under 16 and 14.8% were aged 60 and over
- 48.6% of the population were male and 51.4% were female
- 97.0% were from a Catholic background and 0.8% were from a Protestant background
- 6.5% of people aged 16–74 were unemployed.

=== 2011 Census ===
On Census Day (27 March 2011) the usually resident population of Crossmaglen Settlement was 1,610 accounting for 0.09% of the NI total.

On Census Day 27 March 2011, in Crossmaglen Settlement, considering the resident population:

- 99.88% were from the white (including Irish Traveller) ethnic group;
- 96.27% belong to or were brought up in the Catholic religion and 3.17% belong to or were brought up in a 'Protestant and Other Christian (including Christian related)' religion; and
- 4.66% indicated that they had a British national identity, 73.04% had an Irish national identity and 21.43% had a Northern Irish national identity.

Respondents could indicate more than one national identity

On Census Day 27 March 2011, in Crossmaglen Settlement, considering the population aged 3 years old and over:

- 22.38% had some knowledge of Irish;
- 1.42% had some knowledge of Ulster-Scots; and
- 3.56% did not have English as their first language.

== See also ==
- Annaghmare Court Tomb
