= St Joseph's High School, Crossmaglen =

St Joseph's High School Crossmaglen Ardscoil Naof Iosaif, Crois Mhic Lionnain

Location
- 77 Dundalk Road; Crossmaglen, Newry, County Down, BT35 9HP; Northern Ireland
- Coordinates: 54.071944°N 6.603052°W

Information
- Religious affiliation: Roman Catholic
- Established: 1961
- Local authority: Education Authority (Southern)
- Principal: Marie Millar
- Gender: Male/Female
- Age: 11 to 18
- Enrolment: 729
- Colour
- Website: http://stjosephscrossmaglen.com/

St Joseph's High School Crossmaglen (Irish: Ardscoil Naomh Iosaif, Cros Mhic Lionnain) is a non selective, Catholic co-educational secondary school located in the town of Crossmaglen in the south of County Armagh, Northern Ireland.

== Catchment area ==
The school attracts students from the parishes of Upper Creggan, Lower Creggan (except Newtownhamilton) and Forkhill / Mullaghbawn in County Armagh. There are seven feeder primary schools (PS) in County Armagh - St. Patrick's PS, Crossmaglen; St. Patrick's PS, Cullyhanna; Clonalig PS; St. Brigid's PS, Glassdrummond; St. Oliver's PS, Carrickrovaddy; St. Oliver Plunkett PS, Forkhill; St. Mary's PS, Mullaghbawn - as well as Shelagh NS, Hacksballcross, County Louth.

== Facilities ==
In 2023, a £20m new school building opened. The new facilities include arts and science classrooms, sports, gym and multi-purpose halls, a separate Learning Resource Centre, administrative block, dedicated school meals kitchen, car parking and bus set-down. The new school is located on the site of the old school’s playing fields. On the site of the demolished buildings are the new 3G games pitches and tennis courts. Influences in the design of the new building include the town square, the traditional Irish round tower, ancient local cairns and graves, local granite and basalt rock formations, Irish bog oak, and the strong local tradition for poetry.

== Academics ==
At Key Stage 3 the subjects offered include English and Literacy, Mathematics and Numeracy, Modern Languages (Irish and French), Arts (Art and Design, Music), Environment and Society (Geography, History), Science and Technology (Science, Technology and design), Learning for Life, Physical Education, Religious Education.

In the 2017–18 GCSE examinations, 72% of students at the school achieved five or more GCSEs at grades A* to C, including the core subjects English and Maths.

The school is a partner in the Newry and Mourne Area Learning Community. Through this partnership, it collaborates with St Paul's High School, Bessbrook in the provision of GCSE and A-Level courses.
