= Annaghmare Court Tomb =

Court tomb in County Armagh, Northern Ireland

- Achadh na Marbh (Irish)
- The Black Castle
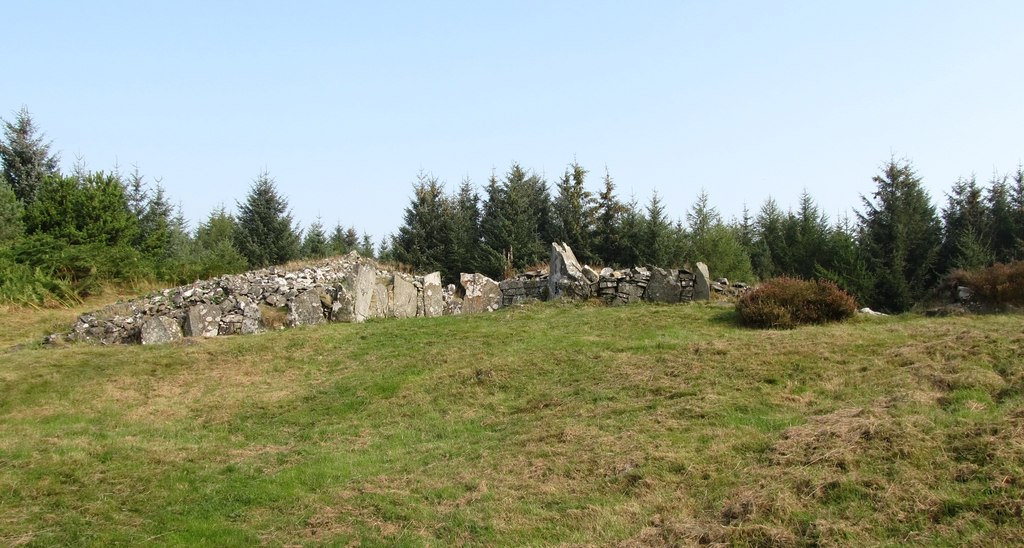

- Location within Northern Ireland
- 54.10179°N 6.61723°W
- Type: court cairn
- Location: Annaghmare, Crossmaglen, Newry, County Armagh, Northern Ireland, BT35 9BJ

Site notes
- Height: 1.9 m (6 ft 3 in)

Annaghmare Court Tomb, also known as The Black Castle, is a chamber tomb located near to the town of Crossmaglen in County Armagh, Northern Ireland. It is one of many megalithic tombs on the island of Ireland.

== Location ==
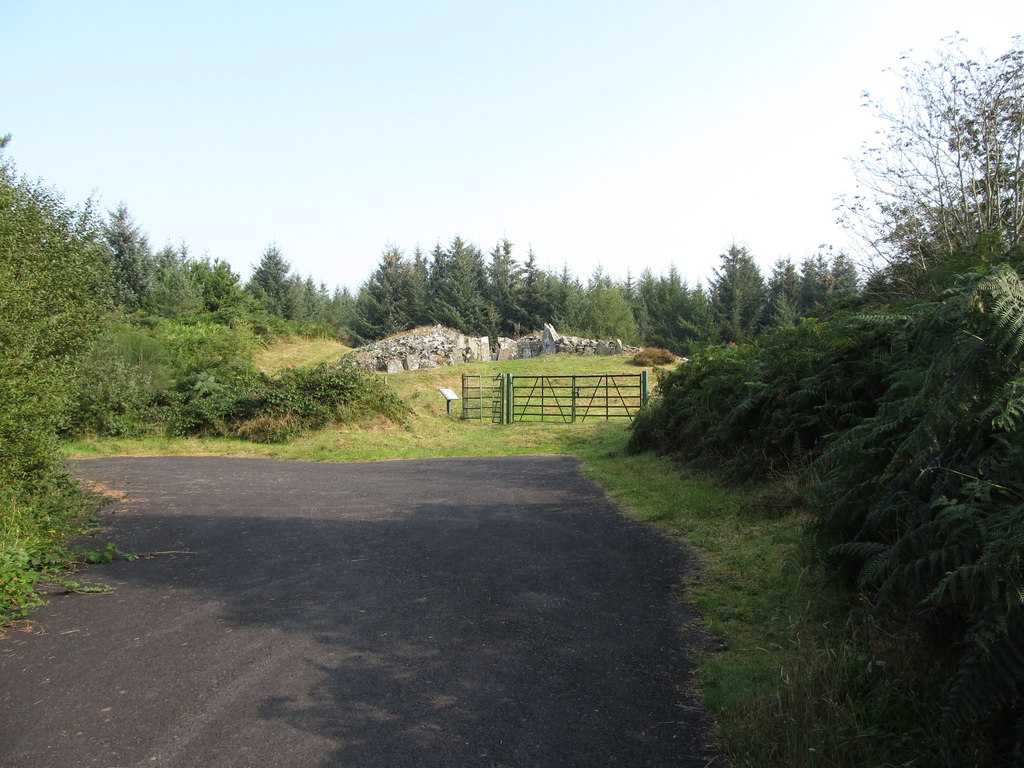
Visitors car parking available at the tomb

Annaghmare Court Tomb is situated 1.73 miles (2.78 km) north-west of the town of Crossmaglen.

== History ==
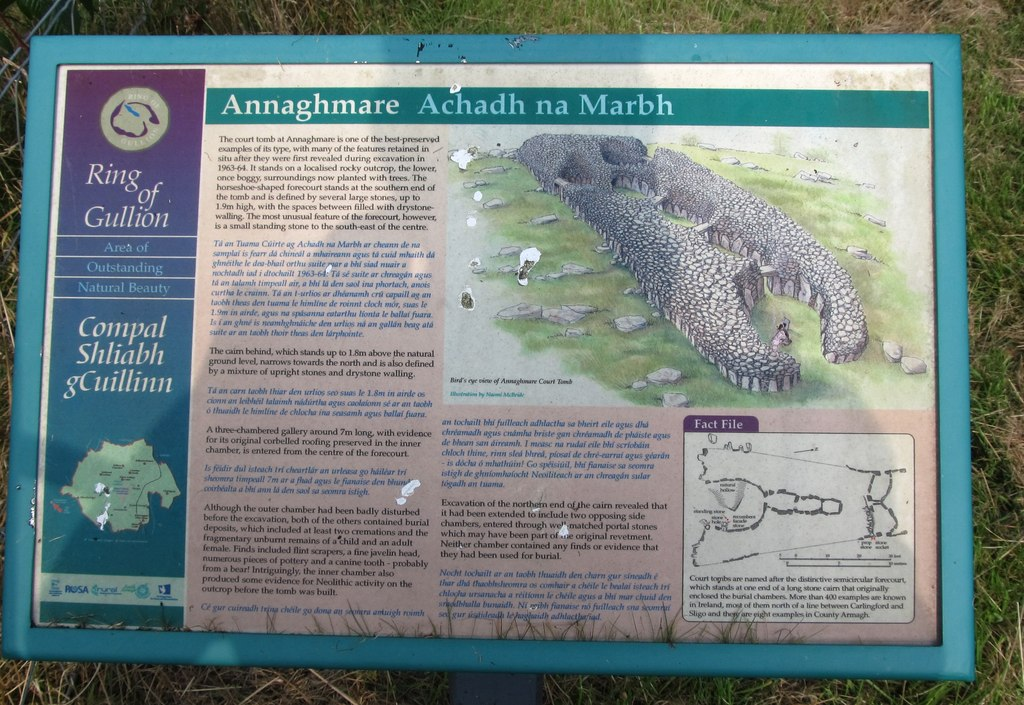
Information panel onsite

The site was excavated in 1963–64, with many of its features preserved in situ. Items recovered from the excavation include cremated bones of at least two individuals, animal teeth, flint tools and pottery from the Neolithic period. It is regarded as "one of the best preserved examples of its type", as other court tombs in Ireland were damaged during the course of their excavations.

The archaeologist and author Peter Harbison described the monument in his 1970 work "Guide to the National and Historic Monuments of Ireland":

Annaghmare is one of the best built of all the court tombs in Ulster. High-quality masonry can be seen in the horizontal drystone walling between the uprights of the more than semi-circular forecourt, which leads into a long triple-chambered burial gallery. The stone mound surrounding this gallery was later extended to enclose two further burial chambers entered from the side of the cairn. Careful excavations in 1963-64 produced the inhumed remains of two individuals and the cremated bones of two more, along with Neolithic pottery, flints - and teeth which probably belonged to a bear.

== Description ==
The forecourt of the tomb is horse-shoe shapes and features several large stones up to 1.9m high. The spaces between were filled with dry stone walling.

The tourist information website visitmournemountains.co.uk notes that the "most unusual feature of the forecourt, however, is a small standing stone to the south-east of the centre".

There is an information board onsite.
