= Gene Morgan (Gaelic footballer) =

Armagh Gaelic footballer

Gene Morgan (1926 – 15 June 2010) was a Gaelic footballer who played as a right corner-back for the Crossmaglen Rangers club, at senior level for the Armagh county team and at inter-provincial level for Ulster.
