= 2007 Ulster Senior Club Football Championship =

The 2007 Ulster Senior Club Football Championship was the 2007 installment of the annual Ulster Senior Club Football Championship which is administered by Ulster GAA. The holders were Crossmaglen Rangers of Armagh. They defeated St Galls of Antrim in the final. Crossmaglen received the Séamus McFerran Cup and went on to represent Ulster in the All-Ireland Senior Club Football Championship.

== Preliminary round ==
Game	Date	Venue	Team A	Score	Team B	Score	Report
Ulster Club SFC; Preliminary round	October 21	Kingspan Breffni Park	Cavan Gaels (Cavan)	0-08	St Eunan's (Donegal)	0-07	

== Quarter-finals ==
Game	Date	Venue	Team A	Score	Team B	Score	Report
Ulster Club SFC; Quarter-finals	November 4	Celtic Park	Glenullin (Derry)	1-15	Newtownbutler (Fermanagh)	1-07	
Ulster Club SFC; Quarter-finals	November 4	St Tiernach's Park (Clones)	Clontibret (Monaghan)	1-07	Crossmaglen (Armagh)	1-08	
Ulster Club SFC; Quarter-finals	November 4	Healy Park	Dromore (Tyrone)	1-10	Mayobridge (Down)	0-13	
Ulster Club SFC; Quarter-final Replay	November 11	Newry	Mayobridge (Down)	1-7	Dromore (Tyrone)	1-9	
Ulster Club SFC; Quarter-finals	November 4	Casement Park	St Gall's (Antrim)	0-13	Cavan Gaels (Cavan)	0-08	

== Semi-finals ==
Game	Date	Venue	Team A	Score	Team B	Score	Report
Ulster Club SFC; Semi-finals	November 18	Healy Park	Glenullin (Derry)	0-07	St Gall's (Antrim)	0-11	
Ulster Club SFC; Semi-finals	November 18	St Tiernach's Park (Clones)	Dromore (Tyrone)	0-11	Crossmaglen (Armagh)	2-06	

== Final ==
Game	Date	Venue	Team A	Score	Team B	Score	Report
Ulster Club SFC; Final	November 25	Páirc Esler	Crossmaglen (Armagh)	1-09	St Gall's (Antrim)	1-06	
