= Coilin Devlin =

Irish Gaelic footballer (born 1985)

Personal information
- Native name: Coilín Ó Doibhilin (Irish)
- Nickname: Dook
- Born: 19 February 1985 (age 41) Ballinderry, County Londonderry, Northern Ireland
- Occupation: Quantity surveyor
- Height: 5 ft 11 in (180 cm)

Sport
- Sport: Gaelic football
- Position: Corner forward
Club
- Years: Club
- 200x–present: Ballinderry
Club titles
- Derry titles: 2
Inter-county
- Years: County
- 2005–present: Derry
Inter-county titles
- NFL: 1

Coilin "Dook" Devlin (born 19 February 1985) is a Gaelic footballer who plays for the Derry county team, with whom he has won a National League title. He plays his club football for Ballinderry Shamrocks and has won two Derry Senior Football Championships with the club.

== Playing career ==
=== Inter-county ===
Devlin made his Derry Senior debut in 2005. He was part of the Derry panel that won the 2008 National League where Derry beat Kerry in the final.

=== Club ===
Devlin has won Derry Championship medals with Ballinderry in 2006 and 2008.

== Honours ==
=== Inter-county ===
- National Football League:
  - Winner (1): 2008
- Dr McKenna Cup:
  - Runner up: 2008
- Ulster U-16 - Winner (2): years?
