= Ulster Senior Club Hurling League =

Hurling league

- Title holders: Dunloy (Division 1)

The Ulster Senior Club Hurling League is an annual hurling tournament played between a number of clubs administered by Ulster GAA. It is played in the early part of the year and is far less prestigious than the Ulster Senior Club Hurling Championship and many sides see it as a warm-up to their respective county leagues and championships. The current Ulster League holders are Dunloy of Antrim.

== Roll of honour ==
| Year | Division 1 winner | Division 2 winner | Division 3 winner | Division 4 winner | Division 5 winner |
|---|---|---|---|---|---|
| 2010 | Cuchullians, Dunloy (Antrim) | Ballinascreen (Derry) | Glen Rovers (Antrim) | McCumhaills (Donegal) | Davitts (Antrim) |

== See also ==
- Ulster Senior Club Hurling Championship
- Ulster Senior Club Football League
