= Oisín McConville =

Armagh Gaelic footballer

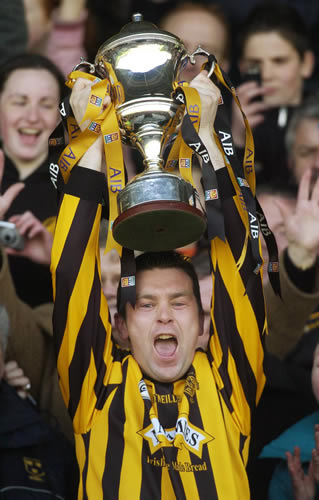

Personal information
- Native name: Oisín Mac Conmhaoil (Irish)
- Born: 13 October 1975 (age 51) Crossmaglen, County Armagh, Northern Ireland
- Height: 6 ft 0 in (183 cm)

Sport
- Sport: Gaelic football
- Position: Left half forward
Club
- Years: Club
- 1993–2013: Crossmaglen
Club titles
- Armagh titles: 16
- Ulster titles: 10
- All-Ireland Titles: 6
Inter-county**
Years	County	Apps (scores)
1994–2008	Armagh	52 (11–197) (230)
Inter-county titles
- Ulster titles: 7
- All-Irelands: 1
- NFL: 1
- All Stars: 2
- **Inter County team apps and scores correct as of 23:27, 7 April 2009 (UTC); Championship games only.

Oisín McConville (Irish: Oisín Mac Conmhaoil; born 13 October 1975) is an Irish Gaelic football manager and former player. He has been manager of the Wicklow county team since 2022. McConville played at senior level for the Armagh county team in the 1990s and 2000s. He won an All-Ireland Senior Football Championship medal, seven Ulster Championships and a National League title with the county. He was also awarded two All Stars.

McConville played club football for Crossmaglen Rangers and won six All-Ireland Senior Club Football Championships, ten Ulster Senior Club Football Championships and 16 Armagh Senior Football Championships with the club.

McConville played as forward. He was one of the game's best point-scorers and an expert free-taker. He was consistently a high scorer for Armagh and is the all-time top Ulster scorer in Championship football with a tally of 11–197 (230). He is widely considered one of Armagh's best ever players. In 2009, to mark the 125th anniversary of the Gaelic Athletic Association, he was named by The Irish News as one of the all-time best 125 footballers from Ulster.

Despite his success on the field, McConville's personal life has been plagued by gambling problems. He now works as an addiction counsellor.

== Background ==
McConville was born in Crossmaglen, South Armagh. His uncle Gene Morgan played for Armagh and played in the 1953 All-Ireland final. McConville's brother Jim is also regarded as one of Armagh's best ever footballers. He also appeared in a New Year's Eve Celebrity Jigs n' Reels special.

== Playing career ==
=== Inter-county ===
McConville made his Armagh Senior debut in the Dr McKenna Cup final at Clones on 25 September 1994.

He played in the half forward line for Armagh in their 2002 All-Ireland winning year. In the 2002 All Ireland Final against Kerry, he overcame the setback of having his first half penalty saved, to step up and score the vital second half goal that was instrumental in Armagh winning a tight contest. As well as his All Ireland Senior medal, McConville holds two All Star awards (2000 and 2002), seven Ulster Senior Championship medals (1999, 2000, 2002, 2004, 2005, 2006 and 2008) and a National League Winners medal (2005). He also holds the record for the highest individual score in an Ulster Final, when he notched 2-07 against Down in the 1999 Ulster Final. He has also won Under 12, Under 14, Under 16, Minor League and Championship, and two U-21 Championships. During his schooldays at Abbey CBS in Newry, he won D'Alton, Corn na nÓg, and Rannafast Cups, and was a MacRory Cup runner up whilst at Saint Patrick's Grammar School, Armagh.

He won six All-Ireland Club titles with Crossmaglen in 1997, 1999, 2000, 2007, 2011 and 2012, and was top scorer in four of those years.

McConville retired from inter-county football after the 2008 season.

=== Club ===
McConville was part of the Crossmaglen team that won 13 Armagh Senior Football Championships in a row between 1996 and 2008. This equalled the national record for consecutive county football championships set by Ballina Stephenites of Mayo between 1904 and 1916. He also won the Ulster Senior Club Football Championship seven times (1996, 1998, 1999, 2004, 2006, 2007 and 2008), and the All-Ireland Senior Club Football Championship six times (1997, 1999, 2000, 2007, 2011 and 2012) with the club. McConville, along with Paul Hearty, John McEntee, Tony McEntee, Francie Bellew and Cathal Short is one of six Cross players to have shared in all these successes since 1996. When McConville missed the 2009 Armagh Championship semi-final against Armagh Harps through injury, it ended a run of 103 consecutive Championship games for Crossmaglen.

McConville announced his retirement from Crossmaglen Rangers after their All-Ireland Club SFC semi-final defeat to St Brigid's on 16 February 2013.

=== School ===
McConville attended the Abbey Christian Brothers' Grammar School, Newry before taking his A-levels at St. Patrick's Grammar School, Armagh.

== Media career ==
He has interviewed people who are involved in Gaelic games for the Sunday Life newspaper, including Barry Cassidy and Tomás Corrigan.

== Managerial career ==
McConville managed Crossmaglen, Meath GAA club Seneschalstown and Dundalk IT, and was managing Monaghan GAA club Inniskeen Grattans when he was appointed manager of the senior Wicklow county team ahead of the 2023 season. His term as Wicklow manager was extended by a further two seasons in July 2025.

In 2026, he led Wicklow to the Tailteann Cup, defeating Down.

== Honours ==
Club

- 17 Armagh Senior Football Championship 1996, 1997, 1998, 1999, 2000, 2001, 2002, 2003, 2004, 2005, 2006, 2007, 2008, 2010, 2011, 2012, 2013
- 10 Ulster Senior Club Football Championship 1996, 1998, 1999, 2004, 2006, 2007, 2008, 2010, 2011, 2012
- 6 All-Ireland Senior Club Football Championship 1997, 1999, 2000, 2007, 2011, 2012

As manager

- 2 Armagh Senior Football Championship 2014, 2015
- 1 Ulster Senior Club Football Championship 2015
- 1 Tailteann Cup 2026

Inter-county

- 1 All-Ireland Senior Football Championship 2002
- 7 Ulster Senior Football Championship 1999, 2000, 2002, 2004, 2005, 2006, 2008
- 1 National Football League 2005

Individual

- 2 All Star 2000, 2002
- Amongst highest scoring players in All-Ireland Senior Football Championship history.

Awards
Preceded by Pádraic Joyce (Galway)	All-Ireland SFC final Man of the Match; 2002	Succeeded by Kevin Hughes (Tyrone)
