= Aaron Kernan =

Armagh Gaelic footballer (born 1983)

Aaron Kernan (born 16 December 1983) is an Irish Gaelic football coach and former player for the Crossmaglen Rangers club and the Armagh county team.

== Playing career ==
=== Club ===
Kernan joined the Crossmaglen Rangers senior team in 2001 and retired following the 2023 Ulster quarter final defeat to Trillick. Throughout his playing career he won 18 Armagh County medals, 8 Ulster club medals and 3 All-Ireland club medals in 2007, 2011 & 2012. In 2007 he received Man of the Match for his performance in the match.

=== Inter-county ===
In 2004 Kernan joined the Armagh senior panel, it wasn't until 2005 that he made the breakthrough onto the Armagh senior team, with his father Joe as manager. In 2005 Armagh won the National Football League and his second Ulster Senior Football Championship. Kernan has won the Ulster championship 4 times in total 2004, 2005, 2006, and 2008 as well as Ulster Under-21 Football Championship in 2004 and an All-Ireland Under-21 Football Championship in 2004.

Kernan was named All Stars Young Footballer of the Year in 2005.

He retired from the inter county game following the 2014 All Ireland quarter final defeat to Donegal.

=== International rules ===
Kernan was a member of the successful Irish team to tour Australia in the 2008 International Rules Series.

== Coaching career ==
In November 2024, Kernan joined Sligo as a defence coach under the management of former teammate Tony McEntee. In September 2025, Kernan joined Robbie Brennan's Meath management team as a defence coach.

== Honours ==
Crossmaglen Rangers

- 18 Armagh Senior Football Championships (2001, 2002, 2003, 2004, 2005, 2006, 2007, 2008, 2010, 2011, 2012, 2013, 2014, 2015, 2018(c), 2019(c), 2022, 2023)
- 8 Ulster Senior Club Football Championships (2004, 2006, 2007, 2008, 2010, 2011, 2012, 2015)
- 3 All-Ireland Senior Club Football Championships (2007, 2011, 2012)

Armagh

- 4 Ulster Senior Football Championships (2004, 2005, 2006, 2008)
- 1 National Football League Division 1 (2005)
- 1 National Football League Division 2 (2010)
- 1 Ulster Under-21 Football Championship (2004)
- 1 All-Ireland Under-21 Football Championship (2004)

Ulster

- 3 Railway Cups (2007, 2009, 2013)

Ireland

- 1 International Series Win (2008)

Individual Awards

- 1 All Stars Young Footballer of the Year (2005)
- 2 Irish News Ulster All-Stars (2005, 2006)
- 1 Gaelic Life Ulster Club All Star (2015)
- 2 Armagh Club All Stars (2018, 2022)
- 1 Armagh Club Footballer of the Year (2018)

== Personal life ==
Kernan is the son of former Crossmaglen and Armagh player and manager Joe Kernan, his brothers Stephen, Tony and Paul were also Crossmaglen and Armagh panel members, and their younger brother Ross played for Crossmaglen also.

Kernan runs his own estate agency in his home town of Crossmaglen.
