= Paul Hearty =

Armagh Gaelic footballer

Personal information
- Born: 1 May 1978 (age 48) Armagh, Northern Ireland
- Height: 1.93 m (6 ft 4 in)

Sport
- Sport: Gaelic football
- Position: Goalkeeper
Club
- Years: Club
- 1995–2018: Crossmaglen Rangers
Club titles
- Armagh titles: 19
- Ulster titles: 11
- All-Ireland Titles: 6
Inter-county
- Years: County
- 2000–2012: Armagh
Inter-county titles
- Ulster titles: 5
- All-Irelands: 1
- NFL: 2
- All Stars: 0

Paul Hearty is an Irish Gaelic footballer who played as goalkeeper for the Armagh county team. He was named in goal for the 2006 Irish News Ulster Allstars team for his performances in Armagh's 2006 Uster championship win.

== Club ==
Hearty was part of the Crossmaglen team that won 13 Armagh Senior Football Championships in a row between 1996 and 2008. This equals the national record for consecutive county football championships set by Ballina Stephenites of Mayo between 1904 and 1916. The 2008 win was Crossmaglen's 37th in all, also drawing them level with Castleblayney Faughs's record of most county football championships ever. Hearty has also won the Ulster Senior Club Football Championship seven times and the All-Ireland Senior Club Football Championship four times with the club. Hearty, along with Oisín McConville, John McEntee, Tony McEntee, Francie Bellew and Cathal Short is one of six Crossmaglen players to have shared in all these successes since 1996.

Hearty retired from the Crossmaglen Rangers in 2017 at the age of 39 but came out of retirement in 2018 for one game at the age of 40 as an emergency goalkeeper a year later in a league match against Armagh harps. He also filled-in as substitute goalkeeper for Crossmaglen in the 2020 county final against Maghery at the age of 42 but did not play. Crossmaglen lost the match 0-17 to 4-09. This was the first time they had lost a county final in 38 years.

== County ==
Hearty also was substitute goalkeeper on the 2002 All-Ireland winning football team, and played on the losing side the following year against Tyrone. He has 6 ulster championship medals a national league and was nominated for an all-star in 2005.

== Honours ==
- Ulster Senior Football Championship (5): 2002, 2004, 2005, 2006, 2008
- National Football League, Division 1 (1): 2005
- National Football League, Division 2 (1): 2010
- Ulster Under-21 Football Championship (1): 1998
- Armagh Senior Football Championship (19): 1996, 1997, 1998, 1999, 2000, 2001, 2002, 2003, 2004, 2005, 2006, 2007, 2008, 2010, 2011, 2012, 2013, 2014, 2015
- Ulster Senior Club Football Championship (11): 1996, 1998, 1999, 2004, 2006, 2007, 2008, 2010, 2011, 2012, 2015
- All-Ireland Senior Club Football Championship (6): 1997, 1999, 2000, 2007, 2011, 2012
- Irish News Ulster All-Stars (2): 2005 2006
