= Ballinderry, Mid Ulster =

Parish in Counties Londonderry/Tyrone, Northern Ireland

Coordinates: 54°39′12″N 6°33′39″W

Ballinderry (from Irish Baile an Doire 'town of the oak wood') is a small civil and ecclesiastical parish on both sides of the County Londonderry / County Tyrone border in Northern Ireland. It is a rural parish of about 350 houses and lies on the western shores of Lough Neagh.

The parish contains two small villages: Ballylifford and Derrychrin, which are of relatively close proximity to Cookstown, Coalisland, Magherafelt and Dungannon. They are also very close to the settlements of Ardboe, Moortown, The Loup, and Ballyronan.

== Places of interest ==
The Ballinderry River flows into Lough Neagh at Ballinderry. The river has formed the border between the two counties of Londonderry and Tyrone since the creation of the former. It is regarded by anglers as one of the best trout rivers in Ulster, and is also good for salmon. One variety of trout, known as dollaghan, is native to the Lough Neagh area. Canoeing is also popular along the river and canoe steps have been built at several points to aid the sport's participants.

Owing to its location on the shores of Lough Neagh, fishing was historically the primary source of income for many local people.

== Notable people ==
- Enda Muldoon - All Star Former Derry GAA footballer.
- Kevin McGuckin - Former Derry GAA player and vice-captain.
- Conleith Gilligan - Former Derry GAA player
- James Conway - Former Derry GAA player
- Suspected serial killer John Bodkin Adams lived in Ballinderry from 1903 to 1911. He became a general practitioner and worked in Eastbourne, England, from 1922. He was charged in 1957 with the murder of two patients but was acquitted. He was however, suspected of causing the death of 163 other patients.

== Sport ==
- Gaelic games are the most popular sports in the area, with Ballinderry Shamrocks GAC being the local club. Páirc na Seamróg is the team's grounds. Ballinderry GAC is best known for winning the All-Ireland Senior Club Football Championship in 2002. They field Gaelic football teams at U8, U10, U12, U14, U16, Minor, Reserve, Thirds and Senior levels. Ballinderry also fields Camogie teams from U6, U8, U10, U12, U14, U16, U18 and Seniors.
- Angling is also popular in the area, judging by the growing membership of "Ballinderry Bridge Angling Club".

== Education ==
- Ballylifford Primary School - Catholic primary school
- Derrychrin Primary School - Catholic primary school

== Townlands ==
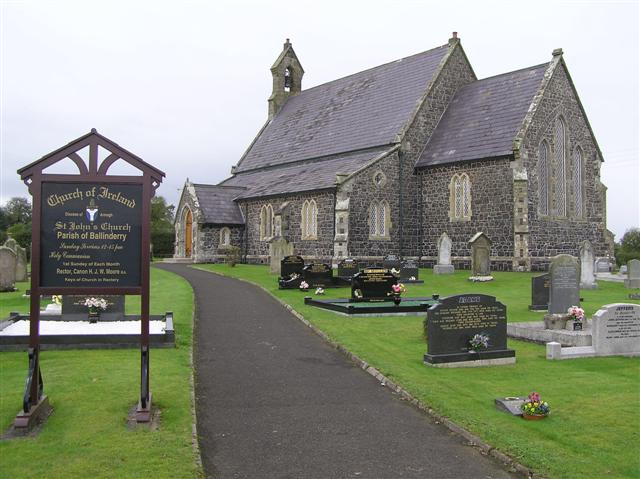
St John's Anglican church in Killymuck

Ballinderry consists of 12 townlands. Below is a list of these townlands along with their Irish origin and meaning.

- Ardagh (from Irish Ard achadh, meaning 'high field')
- Ballinderry (from Irish Baile an Doire, meaning 'town of the oakwood')
- Ballydonnell (from Irish Baile Uí Domhnaill, meaning 'townland of the O'Donnells')
- Ballylifford
- Ballymultrea (from Irish Baile Uí Maoiltrea, meaning 'O'Multrea's townland')
- Ballyronan Beg (from Irish Baile Uí Ronáin Beag, meaning 'O'Ronans town (little)')
- Belagherty
- Killymuck (from Irish Coill a Muc, meaning 'the wood of the pigs')
- Lanaglug (from Irish Lann na gClog, meaning 'church of the bells')
- The Gort alias Eglish (from Irish Eaglais, meaning 'church')
- Mullan Upper (from Irish Mullán, meaning 'small summit')
- Mullan Lower (from Irish Mullán, meaning 'small summit')

== See also ==
- List of villages in Northern Ireland
