= Francie Bellew =

Armagh Gaelic footballer (born 1976)

Personal information
- Nicknames: Francie; Big Francie
- Born: 25 March 1976 (age 50) Crossmaglen, County Armagh, Northern Ireland
- Height: 6 ft 0 in (183 cm)

Sport
- Sport: Gaelic football
- Position: Full back
Club
- Years: Club
- 199x-: Crossmaglen
Club titles
- Armagh titles: 13
- Ulster titles: 7
- All-Ireland Titles: 5
Inter-county**
| Years | County | Apps (scores) |
| 2002-2009 | Armagh | 44 (?) |
Inter-county titles
- Ulster titles: 5
- All-Irelands: 1
- NFL: 1
- All Stars: 1
- **Inter County team apps and scores correct as of 17:20, 22 April 2017 (UTC); Championship games only.

Francis "Francie" Bellew (born 25 March 1976) is a Gaelic footballer who played for the Armagh county team. He has won an All-Ireland Senior Football Championship medal, five Ulster Championships and a National League title with the county. He was also awarded an All Star for his performances in 2003.

Bellew plays club football for Crossmaglen Rangers and has won four All-Ireland Senior Club Football Championships, seven Ulster Senior Club Football Championships and 13 Armagh Senior Football Championships with the club.

Bellew usually plays as full back for both club and county. He is known as a hard-hitting and tough old-fashioned full back and these attributes along with his quiet demeanor and reluctance to talk to the media has resulted in him having a cult following among Armagh and Crossmaglen fans. He features in 24 reasons "Why GAA is better than soccer" under #6: John Terry would run a mile if he came up against Francie Bellew.

== Playing career ==
=== Inter-county ===
Bellew made his Senior inter-county debut for Armagh against Louth in early 2002, and subsequently made his Championship debut against Tyrone later that year. That year he helped Armagh win the Ulster Senior Football Championship as well as the county's first ever All-Ireland Senior Football Championship.

In 2003 Armagh once again reached the All-Ireland final, but were defeated by neighbours Tyrone. He received an All Star award for his performances that year. 2004 saw Bellew and Armagh again win the Ulster Championship.

In 2005 Bellew helped Armagh win the National League, beating Wexford in the final. Later that year he helped Armagh win another Ulster Championship.

Armagh completed a three-in-a-row of Ulster Championships in 2006. Bellew won another Ulster Championship medal with Armagh in 2008, his fifth in all.

Bellew retired from inter-county football in April 2009.

=== Club ===
Bellew is part of the Crossmaglen team that has won 13 Armagh Senior Football Championships in a row between 1996 and 2008. This equals the national record for consecutive county football championships set by Ballina Stephenites of Mayo between 1904 and 1916. He has also won the Ulster Senior Club Football Championship eight times (1996, 1998, 1999, 2004, 2006, 2007, 2008 and 2010 and the All-Ireland Senior Club Football Championship five times (1997, 1999, 2000, 2007 and 2011) with the club. Bellew, along with Paul Hearty, John McEntee, Tony McEntee, Oisín McConville is one of six Cross players to have shared in all these successes since 1996.
