= Tony McEntee =

Gaelic footballer and manager

Personal information
- Born: 30 June 1977 (age 49)
- Height: 6 ft 0 in (183 cm)

Sport
- Sport: Football
Club
- Years: Club
- Crossmaglen Rangers
Inter-county
- Years: County
- Armagh
Inter-county titles
- All-Irelands: 1
- NFL: 1

Tony McEntee (born 30 June 1977) is a Gaelic football manager and former player. He managed the senior Sligo county team between 2020 and 2025.

McEntee played for the Crossmaglen Rangers club and at senior level for the Armagh county team. He won All-Ireland Club SFC titles as a player and joint-manager of Crossmaglen Rangers and an All-Ireland Senior Football Championship and National Football League title while playing for Armagh.

== Career ==
As a player McEntee won the All-Ireland Senior Football Championship in 2002.

McEntee co-led (with Gareth O'Neill) Crossmaglen Rangers to consecutive All-Ireland Senior Club Football Championship titles in 2011 and 2012, alongside three Armagh Senior Football Championships and three Ulster Senior Club Football Championships. However, McEntee and O'Neill left their managerial roles when the club's attempt to win a third consecutive All-Ireland Club SFC failed in 2013. Later that year, McEntee was appointed as manager of the St Brigid's GAA (Dublin) senior football team, succeeding Gerry McEntee and Mark Byrne.

McEntee was a selector with Mayo under the management of Stephen Rochford. He was appointed as Sligo senior manager in November 2020 for a three-year term. He stayed as Sligo manager for the 2022 season.

He led Sligo to the 2022 Tailteann Cup semi-final, narrowly missing an appearance in the final after a three-point defeat. Afterwards it was announced that he would continue as Sligo manager for the 2023 season. The possibility of an extension as Sligo manager was reported upon. McEntee quit his role as manager following Sligo's June quarter-final exit from the 2025 Tailteann Cup to Fermanagh.

McEntee has described his managerial style as "direct". He excludes a player for only four reasons: "injury, application, attitude or ability."

He is the twin brother of John McEntee.

Preceded by Paul Taylor	Sligo Senior Football Manager; 2020–2025	Succeeded by Dessie Sloyan & Eamonn O'Hara
Achievements
Preceded by Lenny Harbinson (St Gall's)	All-Ireland Club SFC winning manager 2011 & 2012	Succeeded by Kevin McStay (St Brigid's)
