= 2006 Ulster Senior Club Football Championship =

Gaelic games competition, Ireland

The 2006 Ulster Senior Club Football Championship was the 2006 installment of the annual Ulster Senior Club Football Championship ran by the Ulster GAA. St. Gall's of Antrim were the defending champions, but they were knocked out of their own county championship by Cargin, who went on to win Antrim. The winners, Crossmaglen Rangers, were awarded the Séamus McFerran Cup after beating Ballinderry Shamrocks in the final and went on to represent Ulster in the All-Ireland Senior Club Football Championship.

== Preliminary round ==
Game	Date	Venue	Team A	Score	Team B	Score	Report
Ulster Club SFC; Preliminary round	October 29	Ballybofey	Gaoth Dobhair (Donegal)	1–04	Crossmaglen Rangers (Armagh)	0–12	

== Quarter-finals ==
Game	Date	Venue	Team A	Score	Team B	Score	Report
Ulster Club SFC; Quarter-finals	November 12	Casement Park	Cargin (Antrim)	0–12	Clontibret O'Neills (Monaghan)	1–09	
Ulster Club SFC; Quarter-final Replay	November 19	Clones	Clontibret O'Neills (Monaghan)	3–08	Cargin (Antrim)	0–10	
Ulster Club SFC; Quarter-finals	November 12	Omagh	Errigal Ciarán (Tyrone)	0–07	Enniskillen Gaels (Fermanagh)	0–06	
Ulster Club SFC; Quarter-finals	November 12	Maghera	Ballinderry (Derry)	0–15	Mayobridge (Down)	0–01	
Ulster Club SFC; Quarter-finals	November 12	Crossmaglen	Crossmaglen Rangers (Armagh)	2–13	Mullahoran (Cavan)	1–07	

== Semi-finals ==
Game	Date	Venue	Team A	Score	Team B	Score	Report
Ulster Club SFC; Semi-finals	November 19	Casement Park	Errigal Ciaran (Tyrone)	0–10	Ballinderry (Derry)	0–10	report
Ulster Club SFC; Semi-final Replay	November 26	Casement Park	Errigal Ciaran (Tyrone)	3–7	Ballinderry (Derry)	1–15	report
Ulster Club SFC; Semi-final	November 26	Kingspan Breffni Park	Crossmaglen Rangers (Armagh)	1–9	Clontibret O'Neills (Monaghan)	0–11	report

== Final ==
Game	Date	Venue	Team A	Score	Team B	Score	Report
Ulster Club SFC; Final	December 3	Casement Park	Crossmaglen Rangers (Armagh)	0–5	Ballinderry (Derry)	0–3	report

== Last 9 Layout ==
Preliminary
Gaoth Dobhair	1–04
Crossmaglen Rangers	0–12

Quarter-finals
Mullahoran	1–07
Crossmaglen Rangers	2–13
Clontibret O'Neills	3–08*
Cargin	0–10
Errigal Ciarán	0–07
Enniskillen Gaels	0–06
Ballinderry Shamrocks	0–15
Mayobridge	0–01

Semi-finals
Clontibret O'Neills	0–11
Crossmaglen Rangers	1–9
Errigal Ciarán	3–7
Ballinderry	1–15

Final
Crossmaglen Rangers	0–5
Ballinderry	0–3
