= Ulster Senior Club Football League =

- Irish: Sraith Sinsir Peile Ulaidh na gClub
- Founded: 2004
- Title holders: Glenullin (3rd title)
- Most titles: Glenullin (3 titles)
- Sponsors: SportTracker

The Ulster Senior Club Football League is an annual Gaelic football tournament played in Ulster GAA between clubs who choose to enter. It starts with a group stage, with the group winners (and for 2008 the best group runner-up) advancing to the knockout stage. It is played in the early part of the year and is far less prestigious than the Ulster Senior Club Football Championship, with many sides viewing it as a warm-up to their respective county leagues and championships. However winning the Ulster Club League has proved a stepping stone for county championship success for several clubs.

== History ==
The competition was the brainchild of former Gaelic Athletic Association President Seán Kelly who asked each province to come up with a cross-county club league competition. The tournament was first held in 2004 with Cavan Gaels emerging victorious.

== Finals listed by year ==
Year	Winner	County	Opponent	County
2016	Glenullin	Derry	Coalisland	Tyrone
2015				
2014	Glenullin	Derry		
2011	Ballinderry	Derry	Burren	Down
2010	Ballinderry	Derry	Mullahoran	Cavan
2009	Ballinascreen	Derry	Dromore	Tyrone
2008	Ballinderry	Derry	Glenullin	Derry
2007	Glenullin	Derry	Latton	Monaghan
2006	Carrickmore	Tyrone	Clontibret O'Neills	Monaghan
2005	Ballinderry and Errigal Ciarán didn't play their final			
2004	Cavan Gaels	Cavan	Carrickmacross	Monaghan

== See also ==
- Ulster Senior Club Football Championship
- Ulster Senior Club Hurling League
