= Crossmaglen Rangers GAC =

Armagh-based Gaelic games club

- Raonaithe na Croise
- Founded: 1887
- County: Armagh
- Nickname: Cross or Rangers
- Colours: Black and amber
- Grounds: St Oliver Plunkett Park (Páirc Oilibhéir Pluincéid)
- Coordinates: 54°04′29.68″N 6°36′32.86″W

Playing kits
Home Kit	Change Kit

Senior Club Championships
	All Ireland	Ulster champions	Armagh champions
Football:	6	11	48

Crossmaglen Rangers Gaelic Athletic Club (Irish: Raonaithe na Croise) is a GAA club in Crossmaglen, County Armagh, Northern Ireland. They cater for Gaelic football and camogie. Their home football ground is St. Oliver Plunkett Park, which was opened in 1959. In 1971 the British Army took possession of a portion of the ground despite opposition from the club and the Irish Government, and this led to a controversy regarding the British Army's conduct.

The club have won the All-Ireland Senior Club Football Championship on six occasions. They have won the Ulster Senior Club Football Championship 11 times and won the Armagh Senior Football Championship 48 times.

== History ==
Founded in 1887 as Crossmaglen Red Hands, the club did not acquire its present name until 1909. The Red Hands claimed the Armagh Senior Football Championship in 1887 through default by Keady Dwyers. After a period of inactivity due to political differences, the Red Hands reaffiliated in 1905, when Owney Martin became the first Crossmaglen player to join the county team. In 1906 the Red Hands won their first contested Championship final, defeating Shane O'Neill's by 1–4 to 6 points. They also won the All-County League. After further political controversy, the Red Hands split, and a new club called Creggan Rovers emerged to win the 1908 championship, defeating Armagh Harps GFC by a point.

The modern Crossmaglen Rangers club started only in 1909. Rangers soon made their presence felt, however, winning the Championship in 1911, 1912 and 1913, overcoming, respectively, Shane O'Neill's, the Harps and Culloville Sons of O'Connell.

In 1918, political divisions in the district disrupted both the Rangers and nearby Culloville Blues GAC, leading to the creation of Crossmaglen Plunketts, supported by republicans, and Clonalig Dillons, supported by Redmondites. The Armagh championship was not played from 1919 to 1922, at the time of the Irish War of Independence. When it resumed, however, Rangers won five successive Armagh senior championships, completing the first five-in-a-row in the competition. This feat went unequalled until Crossmaglen achieved it again in 2000.

In 1929 the Rangers' Jamesy Kernan (uncle of Joe Kernan) died in hospital from injuries sustained in an on-field clash with Cavan Garda Jim Smith during an Ulster semi-final at Belturbet. Smith was charged with murder, but the case was dismissed.

Rangers won further titles in 1933, 1936 and 1937. The 1940s were to prove a more frustrating decade for Crossmaglen, their only county senior title being in 1947. The 1950s were still more difficult for Crossmaglen, being the only decade of the twentieth century in which they did not win an Armagh Championship.

After this, however, the club's fortunes revived considerably. Rangers captured five Championships in the 1960s (1960, 1962, 1965, 1966 and 1967), in addition to several league titles. Further Armagh Championships were won in 1970, 1975, 1977, 1983 and 1986.

Crossmaglen Rangers regained the County title in 1996 after a lapse of ten years, beating Clan na nGael 3–12 to 1–4. Since then, they have been completely dominant in the tournament, retaining the title every year since, with the only exception being 2009. In this period, they have won eleven Ulster Senior Club Football Championships (1996, 1998, 1999, 2004, 2006, 2007, 2008, 2010, 2011, 2012 and 2015). They have gone on to win the All-Ireland Senior Club Football Championship six times, in 1997, 1999, 2000, 2007, 2011 and 2012.

The club fields underage teams from U-10 to U-21 as well as Senior, Junior and 'B' teams. Ladies football and camogie are played in the club, with the camogie teams in particular achieving much success in recent years. The seniors play in the Armagh Senior Leagues and Armagh Senior Football Championship.

On 19 October 2008 the club won their 13th Armagh Senior Club Football Championship in a row by defeating Pearse Óg. This was a national record. This unbeaten run came to an end in 2009 when they were defeated by eventual champions Pearse Óg at the quarter-final stage.

In 2010 a new look Crossmaglen team emerged and regained the Armagh Senior title, they then went on and regained the Ulster Championship before completing the season with yet another All Ireland Title in 2011 defeating St Brigid's from Roscommon in the final to claim their fifth All Ireland club title. In 2012 they retained the title by defeating Garrycastle from Westmeath after a replay to claim their sixth championship.

== St Oliver Plunkett Park ==
Crossmaglen Rangers homeground is St. Oliver Plunkett Park (Irish: Páirc Oilobheir Pluinceid), which was officially opened on 19 April 1959. The Armagh GAA county team have played inter-county games there.

In 1971, in the early years of The Troubles, part of Crossmaglen's property at St. Oliver Plunkett's Park was requisitioned by the British Army for a military base despite attempts by the club and the Irish Department of Foreign Affairs to prevent it. The club grounds were subsequently damaged by the movement of vehicles. With the end of The Troubles in 1998, the club regained possession of the grounds and have embarked upon a series of development programs.

In recent times, the club has purchased more land to develop additional senior standard playing facilities. Extensive renovations on the Rangers Hall were completed, and the then GAA President Jack Boothman opened the new Social Club Complex.

== Notable players ==
- Francie Bellew, Armagh county team player, 2003 All Star All Ireland Winner Armagh 2002, National League 2005
- Paul Hearty, Armagh county team player, 19 County Senior Club Championships, All Ireland County Championship Winner Armagh 2002, National League 2005
- Aaron Kernan, Armagh county team player, All Ireland U21 County Winner 2004, National League 2005
- Joe Kernan, winner of two GAA All Stars 1977 & 1980 - replacement 1982, Armagh manager, Ulster Manager, Ireland Manager
- Seamus Mallon
- Oisín McConville, winner of two All Stars, the all-time top scorer in Ulster Senior Championship history; also holds a national record for playing 103 Armagh Senior Football Championship games in succession
- John McEntee, All-Ireland winner Armagh 2002, National League 2005
- Tony McEntee, All-Ireland winner Armagh 2002, National League 2005
- Gene Morgan All-Ireland team 1954,
- Oisín O'Neill
- Rian O'Neill

== Football titles ==
=== Senior ===
- All-Ireland Senior Club Football Championship (6 times):
  - 1997, 1999, 2000, 2007, 2011, 2012
- Ulster Senior Club Football Championship (11 times):
  - 1996, 1998, 1999, 2004, 2006, 2007, 2008, 2010, 2011, 2012, 2015
- Armagh Senior Football Championship (48 times):
  - 1906, 1908, 1911, 1912, 1913, 1923, 1924, 1925, 1926, 1927, 1933, 1936, 1937, 1947, 1960, 1962, 1965, 1966, 1967, 1970, 1975, 1977, 1983, 1986, 1996, 1997, 1998, 1999, 2000, 2001, 2002, 2003, 2004, 2005, 2006, 2007, 2008, 2010, 2011, 2012, 2013, 2014, 2015, 2018 2019 2022, 2023, 2026

=== Under-21 ===
- Armagh Under-21 Football Championship (12 times):
  - 1977, 1979, 1991, 1993, 1994, 1995, 1996, 2006, 2009, 2010, 2016, 2017

=== Minor ===
- Ulster Minor Football Championship (1 time):
  - 2015
- Armagh Minor Football Championship (11 times):
- 1971, 1977, 1989, 1993, 2001, 2005, 2006, 2014, 2015, 2016, 2018

== Ladies football titles ==
Started in 1996

=== Armagh Ladies Senior Championship ===
Intermediate (6 times)

- 1999, 2000, 2001, 2002, 2003, 2004

=== Junior ===
- 1997 (RU), 1998

=== Minor ===
- 2018 (Cross 7:15 Granemore 1:04)

== Camogie titles ==
- All-Ireland Junior Club Camogie Championship (1 time):
  - 2003
- Ulster Junior Club Camogie Championship (1 times):
  - 2003
- Armagh Senior Camogie Championship (1 times):
  - 2003
- Armagh Intermediate Camogie Championship (1 times):
  - 2018
