= Ballinderry Shamrocks GAC =

Derry-based Gaelic games club

- Baile an Doire na Seamróga CLG
- Founded: 1926
- County: Derry
- Nickname: Shamrocks
- Colours: White and Blue
- Grounds: Shamrock Park (Páirc na Seamróga)
- Coordinates: 54°39′30.51″N 6°33′32.02″W

Playing kits
Home Kit	Change Kit

Senior Club Championships
	All Ireland	Ulster champions	Derry champions
Football:	1	3	13

Ballinderry Shamrocks GAC (Irish: Baile an Doire na Seamróga CLG) is a Gaelic Athletic Association club based in Ballinderry, County Londonderry, Northern Ireland. The club is a member of the Derry GAA and caters for gaelic football and camogie.

The club's biggest success was winning the 2002 All-Ireland Senior Club Football Championship. They have won the Ulster Senior Club Football Championship three times and won the Derry Senior Football Championship on 11 occasions.

== History ==
=== Gaelic football ===
Records show that by 1896 Gaelic football and the Gaelic League were organised in Ballinderry. In 1915 Ballinderry competed in what was then known as the Killybearn League. Other teams competing were Moneymore, Mullinahoe (part of Ardboe), Drumaney (part of Ardboe), Drummullan, Killybearn and Stewartstown. Up to 1919 Bellagherty (Irish: Baile Uí Facharthaigh), a townland of Ballinderry had their own team.

1924 witnessed a revival of Gaelic football in South Londonderry through the efforts of Father Downey C.C., who was assisted by Master Wallace (Ballinderry), Master O’Brien (Magherafelt), Hugh A. Mullan and J.J. McNally. Other teams in South Londonderry at the time included Lissan, Magherafelt, Newbridge, Gulladuff and Glenullin (now a North Derry club).

By 1926 Ballinderry officially formed as one team representing all the townlands of Ballinderry. The club was named Ballinderry Shamrocks GAC (Irish: Baile an Doire na Seamróga CLG). A year later the side claimed their first Derry Championship, after a final victory over Drumsurn.

In the late 1920s and early 1930s Ballinderry competed in the Tyrone league and Championship. Gaelic football was once again revived in South Londonderry in 1933 and Ballinderry returned to compete in Derry competitions.

From 1933 to 1936 Ballylifford (Irish: Baile Leithearr), another townland of Ballinderry competed as a separate team. When Ballylifford and Ballinderry met this meant brother against brother in some cases. In 1938 a parish league was formed (between five Ballinderry teams): Bellagherty, St. John's, Ballinderry, Derrychrin and Mullan Fianna. Mullan were the eventual winners, the prize being a trip to the All-Ireland Final. Mullan Fianna competed as Ballinderry's sole team for a few years, but the Ballinderry Shamrocks side restarted in the early 1940s.

The club moved to their current ground (Shamrock Park) in 1971. It was officially opened in 1979 with an Ulster U-21 Football Championship semi-final between Derry and Down. After a gap of 47 years, 1974 saw Ballinderry win their second Derry Senior Championship, defeating Banagher in the final.

The early 1980s were a glory period for the club and became only the second side after Bellaghy to win the Derry Championship three consecutive seasons (1980 to 1982). The club beat Burren of Down to claim the 1981 Ulster Senior Club Football Championship, before losing by a point to Garrymore (Mayo) in the All-Ireland Club Championship semi-final.

The club won another county championship in 1995, defeating rivals Bellaghy at Watty Graham Park, Maghera. The Shamrocks met Bellaghy in the Derry final in 1999, 2000 and 2001; the Shamrocks won in the final year and went on to victory over Mayobridge in the Ulster Senior Club Football Championship decider. Ballinderry went on to reach the 2001/02 All-Ireland Senior Club Football Championship, which they won defeating Tír Chonaill Gaels (London) in the quarter-final, Rathnew (Wicklow) in the semi-final and Nemo Rangers (Cork) in the final on a scoreline of 2-10 (16 points) to 0-9 (9 points). The club were awarded Derry Club of the Year in 2001 under the AIB GAA Club of the Year Awards scheme. Club Chairman Michael Donnelly was presented the award by GAA President Seán McCague. Ballinderry also won Club of the Year at the 2002 Ulster GAA Writer's Association Awards.

The club defended the Derry Championship in 2002, with victory over An Lúb in the final, but lost to Errigal Ciarán in the Ulster semi-final.

Ballinderry won their ninth Derry Championship in 2006 after a gap of four years and reached the Ulster Club final.

In 2007, the journalist and former Derry player Joe Brolly described Ballinderry as "one of the great communities of Ireland".

Derry played St. Mary's University College at Shamrock Park in the 2008 Dr. McKenna Cup, believed to be the first inter-county competition game played at the venue. The Shamrocks regained the Derry Championship in 2008 - the club's tenth title.

=== Camogie ===
In 2003 the under-age teams won the Under 14, 16 and 18 county championships.

In 2004 the club was awarded the Irish News Ulster Club award for commitment to under-age teams and coaching.

In 2022, the team won their first national title.

== Football titles ==
=== Senior ===
- All-Ireland Senior Club Football Championship: 1
  - 2002

Year	Squad	Opponent
2001–2002	M Conlon, K McGuckin, N McCusker, J Bell, P Wilson, R McGuckin, D Crozier, S Donnelly, E Muldoon 0–1, B McOscar 0–1, C Gilligan 0–1, D Conway 0–2, D Bateson 1–1, A McGuckin, G Cassidy 1–4. Subs – M Harney for B McOscar. Manager: B McIver	Nemo Rangers

- All-Ireland Kilmacud Crokes Sevens Championship: 1
  - 1998.

Year	Squad	Opponent
1998	D Bateson, J Bell, G Cassidy, D Conway, S Donnelly (Capt.), C Gilligan, B McOscar, N McCusker, E Muldoon, F Muldoon.	

- Ulster Senior Club Football Championship: 3
  - 1981, 2001, 2013

Year	Squad	Opponent
2001	M Conlon, K McGuckin, N McCusker, J Bell, P Wilson, R McGuckin, D Crozier, S Donnelly 0–1, E Muldoon 1–0, B McOscar, C Gilligan 0–2, D Conway 0–3, D Bateson 0–2, A McGuckin 0–2, G Cassidy. Subs – J Conway for McOscar, S McGeehan for G Cassidy.	Mayobridge

- Ulster Senior Club Football League: 3
  - 2008, 2010, 2011
- Derry Senior Football Championship: 12
  - 1927, 1974, 1980, 1981, 1982, 1995, 2001, 2002, 2006, 2008, 2011, 2012, 2013

Year	Squad	Opponent
2001	M Conlon, K McGuckin, N McCusker, S Mullan, P Wilson, R McGuckin, D Crozier, E Muldoon 0–1, R Bell, C Gilligan 0–2, S Donnelly, D Conway 0–1, D Bateson 1–0, A McGuckin, G Cassidy 0–5. Subs – J Conway for R Bell, J Bell for S Mullan, B McOscar for D Conway, M Harney for D Conway, D McGeehan for D Bateson.	Bellaghy

Year	Squad	Opponent
2002	M Conlon, K McGuckin, N McCusker, J Bell, P Wilson, R McGuckin, D Crozier, S Donnelly, J Conway 0–1, M Harney, C Gilligan 0–1, D Conway 1–3, D Bateson, E Muldoon, G Cassidy 0–6. Subs – A McGuckin for M Harney.	An Lúb

Year	Squad	Opponent
2006	M Conlon, K McGuckin, N McCusker, D Crozier, P Wilson, R McGuckin, M McIver, J Conway, S Donnelly, D Conway, C Gilligan (Capt.), M Harney, J Bateson, E Muldoon, R Wilkinson. Subs – C Devlin for M Harney, K 'Moss' McGuckin for S Donnelly, B Conway for P Wilson, M Muldoon for R Wilkinson, R Devlin for J Bateson.	An Lúb

- Derry Senior Football League: 11
  - 1974, 1975, 1980, 1992, 1993, 1995, 1996, 1997, 2005, 2006, 2007
- Derry Junior Football Championship: 1
  - 1993 (won by Ballinderry Thirds team)
- Larkin Cup ?*
  - 2006, 2007, 2008, 2017
- McGlinchey Cup ?*
  - 2004.
- Bishops Cup ?*
  - 1989.

=== Reserves ===
- Derry Reserve Football Championship: 9
  - 1976, 1996, 1997, 1999, 2001, 2003, 2005, 2006, 2007, 2017
- Derry Reserve Football League: 9
  - 1976, 1977, 1978, 1996, 1997, 1999, 2001, 2003, 2006, 2018, 2024
- Graham Cup 3*
  - 1976, 1977, 2006. 2009

=== Under-21 ===
- Derry Under-21 Football Championship: 1
  - 1999.

=== Minor ===
- Ulster Minor Club Football Championship: 4
  - 1996, 1997, 2001, 2008.
- Derry Minor Football Championship: 7
  - 1989, 1996, 1997, 2001, 2002, 2003, 2008.
- Derry Minor Football League: 7*
  - 1952, 1997, 1998, 2001, 2002, 2005, 2008

== Notable players ==
- Declan Bateson - member of Derry's 1993 All-Ireland winning panel.
- Coilin Devlin - winner of National Football League with Derry in 2008.
- Conleith Gilligan - winner of two National Football League titles with Derry.
- Enda Muldoon - All Star winning Derry footballer.
- Gareth McKinless - All Star winning Derry footballer.

== See also ==
- Derry Senior Football Championship
- List of Gaelic games clubs in Derry
