= 2003 All-Ireland Senior Football Championship final =

2003 All-Ireland Football Championship final
- Event: 2003 All-Ireland Senior Football Championship
Tyrone	Armagh
0–12	0–9
- Date: 28 September 2003
- Venue: Croke Park, Dublin
- Referee: Brian White (Wexford)
- Attendance: 79,391

The 2003 All-Ireland Senior Football Championship final was the 116th final of the All-Ireland Senior Football Championship (SFC), a Gaelic football tournament. It was held on 28 September 2003 at Croke Park, Dublin, and featured defending champions Armagh against Tyrone. With both finalists located in the northern province of Ulster, this was the first All-Ireland SFC final to be contested by sides from the same province. Tyrone won a first title when the match finished 0–12 – 0–9 in their favour.

== Competition structure ==
Each of the 32 traditional counties of Ireland is represented in the sport by a county team. Apart from Kilkenny, they all participated in the 2003 All-Ireland Senior Football Championship. Teams from the "overseas counties" of London and New York were also involved. Every county team in Ireland is located in one of four provinces; London and New York were allocated to the western province of Connacht for the purpose of this competition. The All-Ireland SFC was preceded by four provincial championships – knock-out competitions contested by county teams in the same province. The four winning teams progressed to the All-Ireland SFC quarter-finals. The remaining sides, apart from New York, entered the All-Ireland SFC qualifiers, with the last four remaining teams there also contesting the All-Ireland SFC quarter-finals. Then followed the semi-finals, and then the final, Joey Mccann

== Background ==
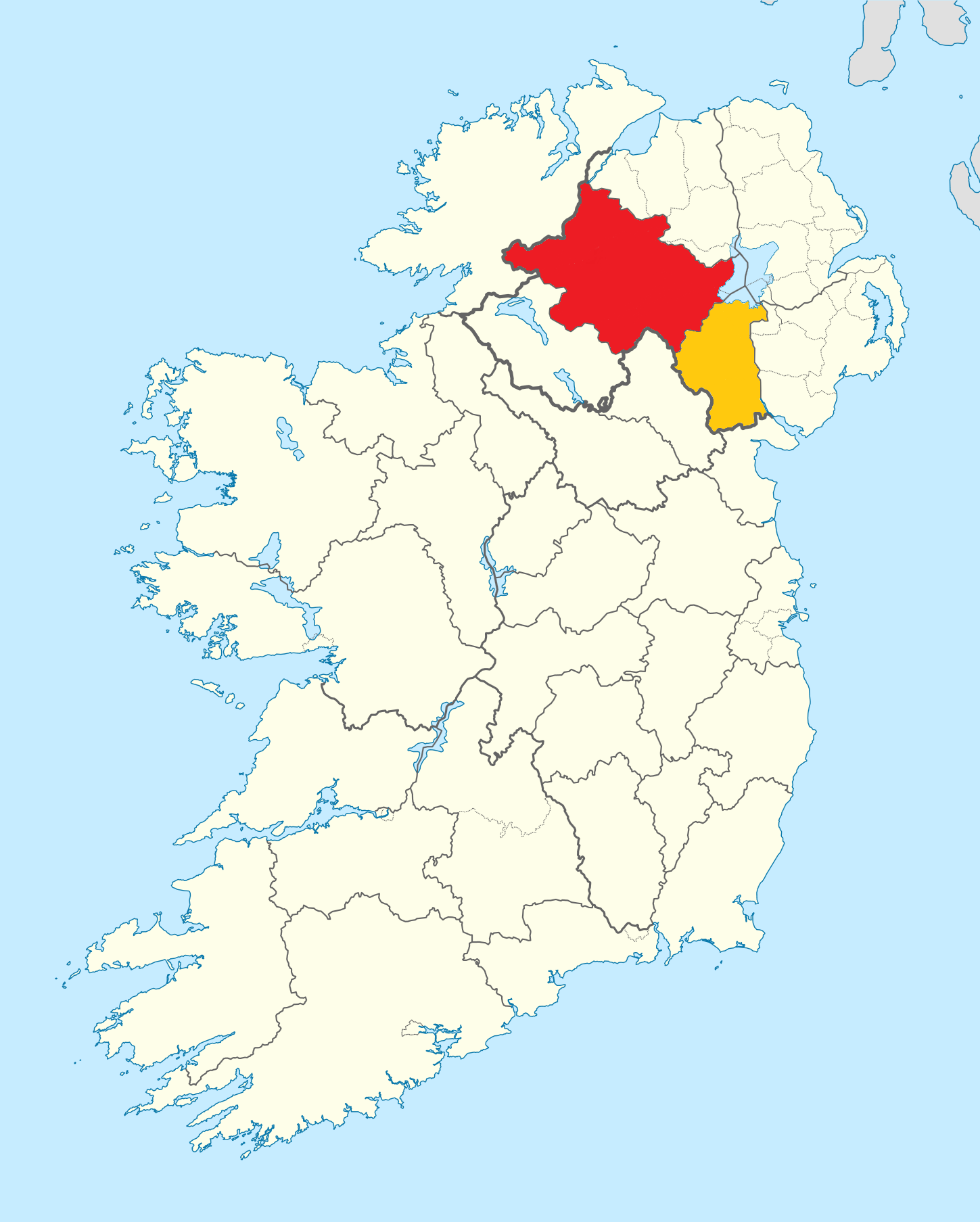
County Armagh (orange) and County Tyrone (red) shown within Ireland

This was the first final between two counties from the same province; in this case, Ulster. This was only possible because of the qualifying system introduced in the 2001 championship. Previously, the All-Ireland SFC was only contested by the four winners of the provincial championships, so a final between two counties from the same province was impossible.

Tyrone had contested the final in 1986 and 1995 but lost on both occasions, against Kerry and Dublin respectively. Armagh were the defending champions, having won their first title the year previously. They had lost the final in 1953 and 1977. No side had won consecutive titles since Cork in 1989 and 1990, while no side from Ulster had done so since Down, who won in 1960 and 1961.

Tyrone had already won the 2003 National Football League and the year's Ulster Championship, in what was manager Mickey Harte's first year in charge.

== Routes to the final ==
Tyrone progressed directly to the All-Ireland SFC quarter finals as they won the 2003 Ulster Senior Football Championship, through victories against Derry, Antrim and Down. Armagh lost to Monaghan in the preliminary round of the Ulster Senior Football Championship (SFC) and therefore entered the All-Ireland SFC qualifiers at the first round. They defeated Waterford, Antrim, Dublin and Limerick to join Tyrone at the quarter-final stage; the ties were played whilst Tyrone were competing in the latter stages of the Ulster SFC.

Sides that had played each other in the provincial championships could not be drawn together in the All-Ireland SFC quarter-finals but this restriction did not affect Armagh or Tyrone. Tyrone were drawn against Fermanagh, who had unexpectedly defeated Meath and Mayo in the qualifiers, while Armagh were drawn against Leinster Senior Football Championship winners Laois. Tyrone won their game by 1–21 (24 points) to 0–5. Armagh defeated Laois by 0–15 to 0–13, although the sides were level on points on nine occasions. Even before Donegal's win over Galway, which meant three of the four semi-finalists were from the province of Ulster, there was intense media speculation about the possibility of an all-Ulster final.

Tyrone's semi-final was against Kerry. Despite their captain Peter Canavan suffering an injury early on, Tyrone won by 0–13 to 0–6. Much of the match analysis focused on the manner in which it was played. It was characterised by persistent fouling (73 frees were awarded in total) and Tyrone's defensive tactics. While many commentators expressed frustration about the quality of the game, some appreciated the skill with which Tyrone employed their tactics. Mickey Harte countered the criticism by saying: "There's no use in us playing flamboyantly and losing."

Donegal were Armagh's opposition in an all-Ulster All-Ireland SFC semi-final. Armagh were behind at half-time, but took advantage of Raymond Sweeney's dismissal just after the interval to finish with a 2–10 (16 points) – 1–9 (12 points) victory. Armagh may have had a larger winning margin had they not amassed 21 wides. A death threat was allegedly made against referee Michael Monahan in the closing minutes.

== Pre-match ==
Brian White, who had previously refereed two All-Ireland SFC finals, was announced as the match referee in early September. He had once previously refereed a game between Armagh and Tyrone – an Ulster SFC quarter-final replay in 2002.

The final was highly anticipated, particularly as Armagh and Tyrone are neighbouring counties. Police Service of Northern Ireland Deputy Chief Constable Paul Leighton estimated that 40,000 fans would travel from Northern Ireland to Dublin, despite each competing county only being allocated approximately 10,000 match tickets. Declan Martin, policy director for Dublin Chamber of Commerce, expected the revenue generated in the city as a result of the final to double because two sides from Ulster were involved.

Road signs in the Pomeroy area were painted in Tyrone colours leading up to the match. This was condemned by the Roads Service, who said the signs would cost thousands of pounds to replace. In Strabane, a sculpture was covered in Tyrone kit. Ulster Unionist Party councillor for the town, Derek Hussey, responded by saying: "I know it is a unique sporting occasion, an all-British All-Ireland final, but the hysteria that has developed around the whole event is intimidatory to some people."

John Boyle, a native of Armagh and owner of Boylesports, expressed an interest in placing a £250,000 bet with nine other businessmen, each of whom would contribute £25,000, on Armagh winning the championship. The winnings and the stake would have been given to the Armagh squad. GAA president Seán Kelly denounced the idea: "Playing is a voluntary activity and should have nothing to do with gambling. Such bets put too much pressure on the players and are somewhat obscene." The GAA was also critical of tickets for the final being sold in newspaper columns and on online auction sites.

== Match ==
Martin McGuinness of Sinn Féin and Ian Pearson of the Northern Ireland Office were at the match, as were eight family members of victims of the Omagh bombing, who sat in the Hogan Stand as guests of the GAA. Donegal musician Mickey Joe Harte sang Ireland's national anthem, "Amhrán na bhFiann", before the match. In the All-Ireland Minor Football Championship final, held just before the senior game, Laois and Dublin drew, each side scoring 1–11 (14 points).

The starting line-ups for the senior game were released several days before the match; both sides chose to start with the same fifteen players that had started their respective semi-final wins. Peter Canavan had recovered sufficiently from the ankle injury he sustained during Tyrone's semi-final to captain them. He was the only player in their starting line-up who had played in the county's last All-Ireland final. Ciaran Gourley, who was also an injury concern for Tyrone, was deemed fit enough to play. Brian McGuigan was suffering from the flu but started. Armagh had no injury concerns and twelve of their starting fifteen had played in the final the previous year – only Paul Hearty, Andy Mallon and Philip Loughran were debutants,

=== Summary ===
Both sides played defensively which led many commentators to bemoan the poor quality of the match. There were frequent pauses for injuries and accusations of diving. However, some analysts commented on the genuine desire to win both teams displayed. Numerous goal opportunities were missed, most notably by Tyrone, although only a block from Conor Gormley prevented Steven McDonnell from equalising for Armagh in the 68th minute. Tyrone led 0–8 – 0–4 at half-time; five of their points were scored by Peter Canavan from frees. He was replaced during the interval due to a relapse of his ankle injury during training, although he did return to the pitch for the final few minutes. Diarmaid Marsden was controversially sent off in the second half following an off-the-ball incident, leaving Armagh with only fourteen players. Marsden was approached by Philip Jordan. Jordan fell to the ground feigning injury to have his opponent sent off. Marsden was subsequently cleared by Central Council when video evidence proved that Jordan had feigned injury. Armagh managed to stay within two points of Tyrone at times, but were ultimately unable to catch Tyrone. At the final whistle, Tyrone fans invaded the pitch and remained there for an hour. In his speech after lifting the trophy, Peter Canavan dedicated the victory to every Tyrone team he had played on, the 1986 team (beaten in the final by Kerry) and every player who had played on teams without success. He also spoke of his father, who had died over the summer, and of Paul McGirr, who had played alongside many of the Tyrone team before he died in a freak accident aged 18.

=== Details ===
28 September 2003

Armagh	0–9 – 0–12	Tyrone
Diarmaid Marsden (0-1); Oisín McConville (0-3, 3 frees); Steven McDonnell (0-2); John McEntee (0-1); Paddy McKeever (0-2, 2 frees)		Peter Canavan (0-5, 5 frees); Gerard Cavlan (0-1); Enda McGinley (0-1); Brian McGuigan (0-1); Owen Mulligan (0-2, 2 frees); Stephen O'Neill (0-2)

Croke Park, Dublin
Attendance: 79,391
Referee: Brian White (Wexford)

Armagh	Tyrone

Armagh:
1	Paul Hearty
2	Francie Bellew		Booked
3	Enda McNulty
4	Andy Mallon	Substituted off
5	Aidan O'Rourke
6	Kieran McGeeney (c)		Booked
7	Andy McCann
8	Philip Loughran		Booked
9	Paul McGrane
10	Rónán Clarke	Substituted off
11	John McEntee	Substituted off
12	Oisín McConville
13	Steven McDonnell
14	Diarmaid Marsden	Substituted off Substituted on	Sent off (straight red)
15	Tony McEntee
Substitutes:
	Paddy McKeever	Substituted on	Booked
	Kieran Hughes	Substituted on
	Barry O'Hagan	Substituted on
Manager:
Joe Kernan

Tyrone:
1	John Devine
2	Ciaran Gourley	Substituted off
3	Cormac McAnallen		Booked
4	Ryan McMenamin
5	Conor Gormley	Substituted off	Booked
6	Gavin Devlin
7	Philip Jordan
8	Kevin Hughes		Booked
9	Sean Cavanagh
10	Brian Dooher
11	Brian McGuigan	Substituted off Substituted on	Booked
12	Gerard Cavlan	Substituted off
13	Enda McGinley
14	Peter Canavan (c)	Substituted off Substituted on	Booked
15	Owen Mulligan
Substitutes:
	Stephen O'Neill	Substituted on
	Colin Holmes	Substituted on
	Chris Lawn	Substituted on
Manager:
Mickey Harte

== Post-match ==
Northern Ireland Secretary of State Paul Murphy congratulated Tyrone on their victory. The Ulster Council of the GAA congratulated both sets of fans, in particular the Tyrone fans who formed a guard of honour for the Armagh players as they returned to their team bus. Joe Kernan, manager of Armagh, also praised the opposition fans: "...when the final whistle went and all the Tyrone supporters came running past me there wasn't one bad word said. To me that was great."

Crowds gathered across Tyrone the following day to celebrate the arrival of the Sam Maguire Cup. The players' homecoming began at Aughnacloy, before moving on to Ballygawley and Omagh, where upwards of 40,000 fans gathered. Despite their defeat, Armagh were greeted by hundreds of fans on the Louth–Armagh border on their return.

In the early hours of the Tuesday after the final, Tyrone footballers sought refuge in Donegal, a town in a neighbouring county across the border. Tyrone manager Mickey Harte had planned this in advance of the final to give his players a reprieve from the fuss that would occur in the event of a victory. They left the Sam Maguire Cup in Aghyaran, home to team sponsor Willie John Dolan; Dolan was given charge of the trophy.

Armagh manager Joe Kernan claimed he would have resigned had his side won, but defeat encouraged him to continue. He lauded his players for their effort nonetheless, saying: "..we've won an All-Ireland, and got back to the final. I think that's a phenomenal achievement." He added that he was confident Armagh would win another title in the future. Of the match itself, Kernan said: "I think if Steven McDonnell had got that goal towards the end, even with the man down I think we would have won the game. Big matches hinge on certain things and that was one of them." McDonnell applauded Conor Gormley's tackle which prevented him from scoring: "...I'd say it was one of the best tackles ever."

The match received extensive media coverage in Northern Ireland, especially from the predominantly nationalist Irish News. The Belfast Telegraph dedicated several pages to the match the following day, including the front and back covers, whereas The News Letter, a largely unionist publication, had sparse coverage, highlighting traditional attitudes to Gaelic games in Northern Ireland.

About a week after the final, a family in Coleraine were targeted in an allegedly sectarian attack, thought to be because they were flying a Tyrone GAA flag from their home.

Two years later, Peter Canavan's return from injury as a substitute in the final ten minutes finished 14th in RTÉ's 2005 series Top 20 GAA Moments.

=== Match controversies ===
Joe Kernan was adamant that Diarmaid Marsden did not deserve to be sent off and criticised players for pretending to be injured during the game. The player himself also disagreed with the decision: "The umpire said I struck him but I just saw the man coming towards me and it was more a case of getting myself out of the way or protecting myself." He added: "I'd never been sent off for Armagh before and to be sent off in an All-Ireland final is hard to take. Hopefully I won't be remembered for that. And I wouldn't like to end the career on that note." Kernan and Marsden contested the decision and subsequent ban, but the GAA's Games Administration Committee upheld the penalty. However, after taking their case to the Central Council, the ban was overturned.
