= 2002 All-Ireland Senior Football Championship final =

2002 All-Ireland Football Championship final
- Event: 2002 All-Ireland Senior Football Championship
Armagh	Kerry
1–12 (15)	0–14 (14)
- Date: 22 September 2002
- Venue: Croke Park, Dublin
- Man of the Match: Oisín McConville
- Referee: John Bannon (Longford)
- Attendance: c. 80,000

The 2002 All-Ireland Senior Football Championship final was the 115th All-Ireland Final and showpiece game of the 2002 All-Ireland Senior Football Championship which began on 5 May 2002. It took place at Croke Park on 22 September 2002.

The game, which was a replay of the 1953 All-Ireland Senior Football Championship final, involved the county teams of Kerry and Armagh. Kerry were attempting to win their 33rd All-Ireland whilst Armagh, competing in a final on only the third occasion were trying to capture the championship for the first time.

Appearing in the county's third All-Ireland SFC decider and having lost the previous two, the team was the first from Ulster to win an All-Ireland SFC since Down won the 1994 All-Ireland Senior Football Championship final. Kerry had a four-point lead at half-time.

In 2018, Martin Breheny listed this as the fifth greatest All-Ireland Senior Football Championship Final.

== Route to the final ==
=== Provincial ===
Kerry were at the time, and remain, the most successful county in terms of number of championships won. Armagh on the other hand, whilst having dominated Ulster for the last number of years, had never gone the whole way to capturing the Sam Maguire Cup. The previous championship meeting of the two counties was in the 2000 All-Ireland semi-final, the first game ending in a draw and the Kerry going on to win the replay and subsequently the Championship.

Armagh's campaign started at St Tiernach's Park in Clones, where they drew Tyrone 1–12 each, Armagh won the replay a week later 2–13 to 0–16. In the Ulster Semi-final they overran Fermanagh by double scores 0–16 to 1–05 and the Ulster Final saw them play Donegal on 7 July, a match which they won 1–14 to 1–10.

Kerry's provincial campaign was not as successful however, losing to Cork in the semi-final 0–15 to 1–09. As a result, they entered Round 2 of the All-Ireland Qualifiers and subsequently dismissed Wicklow 5–15 to 0–07. The next round saw them face Fermanagh, who had already been defeated by Armagh. Fermanagh again proved impotent as Kerry steamrolled them 2–15 to 0–04. Kildare, their opponents in the fourth and final Qualifier game were beaten double scores 2–10 to 1–05.

=== All-Ireland Series ===
Armagh faced Sligo, the beaten Connacht finalists, in the All-Ireland quarter-final. The first game in Croke Park ended in a 2–09 to 0–15 draw leading many pundits, especially Pat Spillane to believe that Armagh would continue to falter on the Croke Park stage. This was not helped by the fact that Armagh won the replay in Navan.

Meeting Dublin, the Leinster champions, in the semi-final on 1 September would be Armagh's biggest test to date. With the game level 0–06 to 0–06 at the interval[] Armagh and Dublin traded scores throughout the second half with neither team having more than a two-point lead at any time, except the brief thirty or so seconds between Armagh's goal and Dublin's almost immediate response. With the game hanging in the balance Armagh's fragile lead was threatened by a free-kick, taken by Dublin star Ray Cosgrove, which ultimately hit the post sending Dublin crashing out and Armagh through to their first final since 1977 by a score of 1–14 to 1–13.

Kerry faced reigning All-Ireland and Connacht Champions Galway in their quarter finals, dismissing the holders 2–17 to 1–12. In a replay of the Munster semi-final Kerry again faced Cork in the All-Ireland equivalent, this time beating the Lee-siders convincingly 3–19 to 2–07.

== Match ==
=== First half ===
Stephen McDonnell opened the scoring for Armagh in the second minute and Kerry forward Mike Frank Russell replied a minute later. McDonnell scored again for Armagh and Rónán Clarke added a third. With Kerry two points down scores from Colm Cooper, Eoin Brosnan and Russell gave Kerry a one-point lead after 15 minutes. Rónán Clarke pulled the game level for Armagh before two points from Dara Ó Cinnéide and a point apiece for Eamonn Fitzmaurice and Liam Hassett put some daylight between the teams. After trading scores for a while Armagh were five points down when Armagh forward Óisin McConville was pulled down by three Kerry defenders under the Canal End and given a penalty however Armagh hopes were dashed as a poor kick was saved by Kerry 'keeper Declan O'Keeffe. A point from Armagh man Diarmaid Marsden gave the Orchard Boys a small glimmer of hope but they went in trailing at the break 0–11 to 0–07.

=== Second half ===
Armagh were late to arrive on the pitch and kept the Kerry team waiting almost 5 minutes as they received a spirited team talk from manager and defeated 1977 finalist Joe Kernan. Kernan showed the team the memento he had received as a player in the 1977 final after Armagh were defeated by Dublin and warned the players that they would face a similar fate if they failed to turn the game around.

Marsden and Ó Cinnéide again traded points and a free kick from McConville reduced the deficit to three. Hassett and McConville scored and the Armaghman converted a 45-metre free, Kerry's last score of the day came as Ó Cinnéide pointed again on 54 minutes.

In the 55th minute McConville charged through the Kerry back-line, played a one-two with teammate Paul McGrane and buried the ball past O'Keeffe in the Kerry net sending Hill 16 into uproar and reducing Kerry's lead to a solitary point. Scores from Rónán Clarke and Steven McDonnell, who had scored the first point of the day, were enough to give Armagh the lead for the first time since the opening stages of the game. Armagh held on for the last ten minutes and that was enough to give the Orchard County their first Championship.

Having scored 14–90 in their previous 390 minutes of play, Kerry managed to score only three points in the second half.

=== Details ===
22 September 2002

Armagh	1–12 – 0–14	Kerry
Oisín McConville 1–2 (0–1f, 0–1 45), Steven McDonnell 0–3, Rónán Clarke 0–3, Diarmaid Marsden 0–3, John McEntee 0–1	Report	Dara Ó Cinnéide 0–5 (0–3f, 0–1 45), Mike Frank Russell 0–3, Colm Cooper 0–2, Liam Hassett 0–2, Éamonn Fitzmaurice 0–1, Eoin Brosnan 0–1

Croke Park, Dublin
Referee: John Bannon (Longford)

Armagh	Kerry

1	Benny Tierney
2	Enda McNulty	(yellow card) 31'
3	Justin McNulty
4	Francie Bellew
5	Aidan O'Rourke	(yellow card) 37'
6	Kieran McGeeney (c)
7	Andy McCann
8	John Toal
9	Paul McGrane	(yellow card) 48'
10	Paddy McKeever		(substituted off) 44'
11	John McEntee		(substituted off) 24'
12	Oisín McConville
13	Steven McDonnell
14	Rónán Clarke
15	Diarmaid Marsden
Substitutes:
16	Paul Hearty
17	Kieran Hughes
18	Cathal O'Rourke
19	Philip Loughran
20	Barry O'Hagan		(substituted in) 24'
21	John Donaldson
22	Barry Duffy
23	Gerard Reid
24	Paul McCormack
25	Simon Maxwell
26	Pádraig Duffy
27	Colm O'Neill
28	Kevin McElvanna
29	Shane Smith
30	Tony McEntee		(substituted in) 44'
Manager:
Joe Kernan

1	Declan O'Keeffe
2	Marc Ó Sé		(substituted off) 57'
3	Seamus Moynihan
4	Mike McCarthy
5	Tomás Ó Sé	(yellow card) 56'
6	Éamonn Fitzmaurice
7	John Sheehan
8	Darragh Ó Sé (c)
9	Donal Daly		(substituted off) 71'
10	Seán Ó'Sullivan		(substituted off) 48'
11	Eoin Brosnan
12	Liam Hassett	(yellow card) 62'	(substituted off) 64'
13	Mike Frank Russell
14	Dara Ó Cinnéide
15	Colm Cooper
Substitutes:
16	Diarmuid Murphy
17	Aodán Mac Gearailt		(substituted in) 48'
18	Johnny Crowley		(substituted in) 64'
19	Tom O'Sullivan		(substituted in) 57'
20	Barry O'Shea		(substituted in) 71'
21	Séamus Scanlon
22	Declan O'Sullivan
23	Mossie Lyons
24	Ian Twiss
25	Fionnán Kelliher
26	Declan Quill
27	Ronan O'Connor
28	Michael Finn
29	Enda Galvin
30	Michael D. Cahill
Manager:
Páidí Ó Sé

== Post-match ==
Two weeks previously at the Hurling Final the Liam MacCarthy Cup was awarded to Kilkenny on a podium in the centre of the pitch whilst Cliff Richard's "Congratulations" was played over the public address system. On John Bannon's final whistle Armagh fans were determined that their first All-Ireland win would not be celebrated in the same way and thousands encroached onto the pitch, many climbing the fences from the Hill 16 end where McConville had scored his goal until stewards relented and opened the gates. Armagh captain Kieran McGeeney lifted the Sam Maguire from the Hogan Stand to a sea of orange and white and dedicated the win to the long-suffering Armagh fans whose hopes had been dashed on so many occasions over the years.
