= Éire Óg Craigavon GAA =

Armagh-based Gaelic games club

Éire Óg GAC
- Éire Óg
- Founded: 1969
- County: Armagh
- Nickname: Ógs
- Colours: Orange and green
- Grounds: Pinebank (Pairc)

Playing kits
Standard colours

Éire Óg Craigavon GAC is a Gaelic Athletic Association (GAA) club based in Craigavon, County Armagh, Northern Ireland. It was founded in 1969 to promote Gaelic games and Irish culture in the then new city of Craigavon. It currently plays Gaelic football in the Armagh leagues, the senior team is currently in the Junior division of the Armagh Senior Leagues and the Armagh Junior Football Championship. Previously the club fielded Senior Camogie and Ladies football teams. The club plays at Pinebank (Irish: Pairc).

== History ==
Membership was small in the early days with only a few housing estates in the area and the first set of (second-hand) jerseys was received from a local club in Portadown. By 1970 six housing estates had been built in Craigavon and Éire Óg's membership and teams grew with the newly developed area.

In 1970 Éire Óg entered the Armagh All County Leagues, and with two new primary schools in the area, it began to field senior, under-12 and under-14 teams in the North Armagh Leagues.

In 1972 the new Senior football strip of green, orange and amber was registered. By early 1973, when Lismore Comprehensive School was established in the community, Éire Óg GFC was fielding teams at all under age levels including U10s and Minors.

During the 1980s the club flourished, and although it was a tumultuous time in Ireland's recent history Éire Óg started to move up the Divisions.In 1977 they experienced their first success when the U14 team won the N. Armagh football league.

== Gaelic football ==
In 1985 Éire Óg had its first championship success winning the Junior Championship. The club moved up to the Intermediate Championship. Also during the 1980s Éire Óg won the U16 and U18 championships, and U12, U16 and Minor Leagues.

In the 1990s the Senior team briefly appeared in Division 1 of the Armagh All-County League where it faced the top clubs of Armagh – Crossmaglen, Clan na Gael, Armagh Harps and Pearse Óg.

In 2000 Éire Óg won the Armagh Intermediate Championship for the first time, defeating Collegeland 0-09 to 1-05.

In 2011 Éire Óg experienced one of its most successful years to date. The club completed an All-County League Division 4 and Junior Championship double, then went on to represent Armagh in the Ulster Junior Football Championship, where they were beaten in the Ulster semi-final to eventual champions Derrytresk of Tyrone. The same year also brought success with the underage teams, notably an U16 All-County Title and an U12 All-County Title.

A decade later in 2022, the club’s u15 squad won the Armagh féile shield and competed in the Ulster féile competition, eventually losing in the semifinals to John Mitchel's GAC Glenullin of Derry.

=== Honours ===
- Armagh Intermediate Football Championship (1)
  - 2000
- Armagh Junior Football Championship (2)
  - 1985, 2011
- Armagh All-County League Division 3 (1)
  - 2000
- Armagh All-County League Division 4 (1)
  - 2011

=== Notable players ===
- Ger Reid, member of Armagh's 2002 All-Ireland winning team

== Camogie ==
1974 saw the formation of a ladies' sub-committee at Éire Óg, and the first camogie team in the club was formed. Teams were fielded in County Armagh Senior Camogie League and in both U11 and U13 leagues.

== Culture ==
Éire Óg has won Armagh and Ulster Scór titles and in 2005 its Irish music instrumental group represented the club at the All-Ireland Scor finals in County Kerry.

Éire Óg continues to promote the Irish language and Irish traditional music throughout the club and within the Craigavon Community.

== Facilities ==
The first matches were played on a rugby field in Monbrief, Craigavon as there were no Gaelic football facilities in the area. By 1972 Craigavon Borough Council had built a Community Hall at Tullygally and Gaelic pitches in Taghnevan. This helped the club in that it provided a nearby venue for home games. A bus was purchased to bring the teams to games. In the 1970s the club had erected goal posts in a field between Carrigart and Pinebank housing estates, and in 1979 was in a position to level out and develop this land to a full pitch for its football and camogie teams.

In 1999 the Department of Environment (DoE) agreed to sell the lease of the Éire Óg pitch; the Éire Óg club embarked on providing the state of the art, modern facilities that exist to this day.
