= Clonmore, County Armagh =

Village in County Armagh, Northern Ireland

Coordinates: 54°29′00″N 6°38′27″W

Clonmore: Irish: Cluain Mór
- Location within Northern Ireland
  - Belfast: 29 mi (47 km)
  - Dublin: 79 mi (127 km)
- District: Dungannon
- County: County Armagh
- Country: Northern Ireland
- Sovereign state: United Kingdom
- Post town: DUNGANNON
- Postcode district: BT71
- UK Parliament: Fermanagh and South Tyrone
- NI Assembly: Fermanagh and South Tyrone

Clonmore (from Irish Cluain Mór 'large meadow') is a hamlet and townland in County Armagh, Northern Ireland. It is 5 miles (8 km) east of Dungannon, close to the banks of the River Blackwater.

== Clonmore shrine ==
The Clonmore shrine was found on the banks of the Blackwater river which runs along the big meadow, and is Ireland's earliest Christian metal artifact. It is housed in the Ulster Museum in Belfast.

== Sport ==
The local Gaelic football club is Clonmore Robert Emmet's GFC, which competes in Armagh GAA competitions at Junior level. Underage boys' football is organised through an amalgamation with neighbors Collegeland and Annaghmore. The teams play as Naomh Eoin. Girls and Ladies football is offered through the sister club Naomh Labhaoise.

== Former railway ==
In 1858 the Portadown, Dungannon and Omagh Junction Railway opened Vernersbridge railway station, 0.7 miles (1.1 kilometres) south of Clonmore. The Great Northern Railway Board closed the station in 1954 and the Ulster Transport Authority closed the railway in 1965.
