= 2015 Down county football team season =

Down county football team
2015 season
- Manager: Jim McCorry
- Stadium: Páirc Esler, Newry
- NFL D2: 1st (runner-up)
- All-Ireland SFC: Round 1 qualifier
- Ulster SFC: Quarter-finalist
- Dr McKenna Cup: Group stage (2nd)

The following is a summary of Down county football team's 2015 season. It was the first and last season for newly appointed Down manager Jim McCorry in charge.

== Kits ==
McKenna Cup and National League Kits

Home	Away

== Competitions ==
Win Draw Loss Postponed/Cancelled

=== Dr McKenna Cup ===
The draw for the 2015 Dr McKenna Cup took place on 5 November 2014.

==== Fixtures ====
Date	Round	Home	Score	Away	Ground
4 Jan	Group	Down	1-09 v 2-11	Cavan	Páirc Esler, Newry
11 Jan	Group	Monaghan	0-11 v 1-12	Down	St. Tiernach's Park, Clones
14 Jan	Group	Down	1-13 v 1-07	UUJ	Páirc Esler, Newry

==== Table ====
Qualification for next round

Team	Pld	W	D	L	F	A	Diff	Pts
Cavan	3	2	0	1	3-34	2-30	7	4
Down	3	2	0	1	3-34	3-29	5	4
Monaghan	3	1	0	2	0-44	4-35	-3	2
UUJ	3	1	0	2	4-25	1-43	-9	2

==== Results ====
4 January 2015
14:00
Group

Down	1-09 — 2-11	Cavan
C Laverty (1-1), P Devlin (0-4, 1f, 1 '45'), G Collins (0-1), C McKay (0-1), A McConville (0-1), D O'Hare (0-1, f)	Report	M Reilly (2-1, one pen, 1 '45'), G McKiernan (0-3), B Reilly (0-3, 2f), D McVeety (0-1), J Brady (0-2, 1f), T Hayes (0-1)

Páirc Esler, Newry
Referee: Barry Cassidy (Derry)
11 January 2015
14:00
Group

Monaghan	0-11 — 1-12	Down
D McKenna (0-3, 2f), D Hughes (0-2), P Finlay (0-2, 1f), P Kierans (0-1), N McAdam (0-1), T Connolly (0-1), P Meegan (0-1)	Report	D O'Hare (1-2, 0-1f), P Devlin (0-3, 1f, 1'45), K McKernan (0-2), N Madine (0-1), P Downey (0-1), A McConville (0-1), C Garvey (0-1), K Anderson (0-1)

St Tiernach's Park, Clones
Referee: Barry Cassidy (Derry)
14 January 2015
20:00
Group

Down	1-13 — 1-07	University of Ulster GAA
C Laverty (1-1), D O'Hare (0-4, 2f), P Devlin (0-2f), D McKay (0-1); N Madine (0-1), P Fitzpatrick (0-1), C Maginn (0-1), A McConville (0-1), C Crilly (0-1)	Report	N McKeever (1-1), C O'Connor (0-3f), P McBrearty (0-2), C Mooney (0-1)

Páirc Esler, Newry
Referee: S Laverty

=== National Football League Division 2 ===
Down played in Division Two of the National Football League in 2015. The fixtures were announced on 18 September 2014.

==== Fixtures ====
Date	Round	Home	Score	Away	Ground
1 Feb	Group	Kildare	1-15 v 3-13	Down	St. Conleth's Park, Newbridge
7 Feb	Group	Down	1-11 v 1-15	Roscommon	Páirc Esler, Newry
28 Feb	Group	Cavan	0-08 v 1-09	Down	Kingspan Breffni Park, Cavan
8 Mar	Group	Down	1-17 v 1-16	Galway	Páirc Esler, Newry
15 Mar	Group	Westmeath	0-10 v 2-17	Down	Cusack Park, Mullingar
28 Mar	Group	Down	0-10 v 2-11	Meath	Páirc Esler, Newry
5 Apr	Group	Down	3-18 v 1-15	Laois	Páirc Esler, Newry
26 Apr	Final	Down	0-15 v 1-17	Roscommon	Croke Park, Dublin

==== Table ====
Compete in Division 2 final and automatic promotion to Division 1
Automatic relegation to Division 3

Team	Pld	W	D	L	F	A	Diff	Pts
Down	7	5	0	2	11-89	6-90	14	10
Roscommon	7	4	1	2	7-99	6-94	8	9
Meath	7	4	1	2	7-87	4-80	16	9
Galway	7	4	0	3	9-88	8-85	6	8
Cavan	7	3	1	3	1-85	7-66	1	7
Laois	7	2	1	4	8-80	5-92	-3	5
Westmeath	7	2	0	5	4-75	11-83	-29	4
Kildare	7	2	0	5	7-87	7-100	-13	4

^{1}Roscommon are placed ahead of Meath because they won the head-to-head game between the teams (2-10 to 0-14).

^{2}Westmeath are placed ahead of Kildare because they won the head-to-head game between the teams (0-15 to 0-12).

==== Results ====
1 February 2015 Round 1	Kildare	1-15 — 3-13	Down	St Conleth's Park, Newbridge
14:00	N Kelly (1-1), E O’Flaherty (0-4, 3f); D Mulhall (0-4, 2f), F Dowling (0-4), P Fogarty (0-2)	Report	D O'Hare (1-6, 0-4f), P Devlin (0-6, 2f), D O'Hagan (0-1), C Mooney (1-0), A McConville (1-0)	Referee: A Nolan

7 February 2015 Round 2	Down	1-11 — 1-15	Roscommon	Páirc Esler, Newry
19:00	A McConville (1-1), D O'Hare (0-3, 1f), J Johnston (0-3), P Devlin (0-2, 1'45, 1f), P Fitzpatrick (0-1); C Maginn (0-1)	Report	D Murtagh (1-4, 0-2f), C Cregg (0-3), C Murtagh (0-2), N Daly (0-1), C Cafferky (0-1), M Nally (0-1), D Shine (0-1f), S Kilbride (0-1), D Smith (0-1)	Referee: Barry Cassidy (Derry)

28 February 2015 Round 3	Cavan	0-08 — 1-09	Down	Kingspan Breffni Park, Cavan
19:00	J McLoughlin (0-1), M Reilly (0-2f), M Dunne (0-1), N McDermott (0-4f)	Report	D O'Hare (1-3, 0-2f), K McKernan (0-2), L Howard (0-1), D Turley (0-1), C McGovern (0-1), J Johnston (0-1)	Referee: P Hughes

8 March 2015 Round 4	Down	1-17 — 1-16	Galway	Páirc Esler, Newry
14:00	D O'Hare (1-5, 0-3f), P Devlin (0-4, 2f, 1'45), C Laverty (0-3, 1f), M Poland (0-2), R McGarry (0-1), K McKernan (0-1), D O'Hanlon, C Mooney (0-1)	Report	M Martin (0-5, 4f), D Cummins (0-4, 2f), A Varley (0-2), S Denvir (0-2), G Bradshaw (0-1), P Sweeney (1-0), D Comer (0-1), P Conroy (0-1)	Referee: Paddy Neilan (Roscommon)

15 March 2015 Round 5	Westmeath	0-10 — 2-17	Down	Cusack Park, Mullingar
14:00	R Connellan (0-1f); C McCormack (0-2, 1'45), J Heslin (0-4, 3f, 1sl), S Dempsey (0-3)	Report	D O'Hare (1-4, 0-1f), A McConville (1-2), C Laverty (0-4), M Poland (0-3), D O'Hanlon (0-2), P Devlin (0-1f), K McKernan (0-1)	Referee: J Hickey

28 March 2015 Round 6	Down	0-10 — 2-11	Meath	Páirc Esler, Newry
19:00	P Devlin (0-3, 2f), K McKernan (0-2), D O'Hare (0-2f), D O'Hanlon (0-1), C Mooney (0-1), J Johnston (0-1)	Report	B Menton (1-2), P Harnan (1-1), M O'Sullivan (0-3f), P O'Rourke (0-1'45), C Gillespie (0-1), J McEntee; E Wallace (0-1), S O'Rourke (0-1), J Wallace (0-1)	Referee: Barry Cassidy (Derry)

6 April 2015 Round 7	Down	3-12 — 1-15	Laois	Páirc Esler, Newry
15:00	P Devlin (1-2, 0-2f), C Laverty (1-1), G Collins (0-1), C McGovern (0-2), C Maginn (0-2), C Mooney (0-2), D O'Hare (0-1f), A McConville (1-0), M Poland (0-1)	Report	R Munnelly (1-4, 1-0pen, 0-3f), E O'Carroll (0-7, 5f, 2'45), D Strong (0-1), R Kehoe (0-1), J O'Loughlin (0-1), N Donoher (0-1	Referee: R Hickey

26 April 2015 Final	Down	0-15 — 1-17	Roscommon	Croke Park, Dublin
14:00	D O'Hare (0-5, 3f), K McKernan (0-2), B McArdle (0-1), P Devlin (0-1); C Maginn (0-1), C Laverty (0-1), C Mooney (0-1), P Fitzpatrick (0-1), R Johnston (0-1), J Johnston (0-1f)	Report	C Murtagh (1-2, 0-1f), C Connolly (0-5, 4f), S Kilbride (0-4), C Cregg (0-1), D Murtagh (0-1), U Harney (0-1), D Shine (0-1f), Cafferkey (0-1), D Smith (0-1)	Referee: Maurice Deegan (Laois)

=== Ulster Senior Football Championship ===
The draw for the 2015 Ulster Senior Football Championship took place on 9 October 2014.

==== Fixtures ====
Date	Round	Team 1	Score	Team 2	Ground
7 June 2015	Quarter Final	Derry	0-12 v 0-11	Down	Celtic Park, Derry

==== Bracket ====
Preliminary round
Donegal	1-13
Tyrone	1-10

Quarter-finals
Cavan	0-15
Monaghan	0-16
Fermanagh	1-13
Antrim	0-08
Derry	0-12
Down	0-11
Armagh	0-08
Donegal	2-11

Semi-finals
Monaghan	1-20
Fermanagh	0-13
Derry	0-10
Donegal	1-09

Final
Monaghan	0-11
Donegal	0-10

==== Results ====
7 June 2015
14:00
Quarter-Final

Derry	0-12 - 0-11	Down
	Report

Celtic Park, Derry
Attendance: 10,541
Referee: Eddie Kinsella (Laois)

=== All-Ireland Senior Football Championship ===
Following defeat to Derry in the Ulster Championship quarter-finals, Down entered the All-Ireland in Round 1 of the qualifiers.

==== Fixtures ====
Date	Round	Team 1	Score	Team 2	Ground
27 June 2015	Round 1B	Wexford	2-16 v 2-11	Down	Wexford Park, Wexford

== Notable events ==
- On Saturday 19 September 2014, Kilcoo manager Jim McCorry was named as the new Down boss on a three-year deal.
- On Monday 24 November 2014, former Down All Star Benny Coulter retired from inter-county football following a 15-year career.
- On 20 August 2015, Jim McCorry resigned as Down manager.
