= Brian Canavan (Gaelic footballer) =

Irish Gaelic footballer

Brian Canavan (born 1956/1957) is an Irish Gaelic footballer and manager. He played as a wing-back.

== Career ==
Canavan joined the inter-county competition in 1978, shortly after many of his teammates had contested the 1977 All-Ireland SFC Final. He played inter-county for 14 years, winning two Ulster Senior Football Championship (SFC) titles. Canavan ended his inter-county playing days in 1990, saying "I was marking a young fella called Declan Bonner and I could see at times that he was a wee bit sharper than I was and I knew rightly that the next year, he'd be getting a bit quicker and I'd be getting a bit slower, so I had a good innings and I thought it was time to move on". Also during his playing days, he featured on the Ulster University and Ulster Railway Cup teams.

Canavan played his club football for Redmond O'Hanlon's in Poyntzpass and he won a Junior Championship with them in 1997 when he was 40. He also took up refereeing.

From 1995 to 2001, Canavan helped manage his county team alongside Brian McAlinden. Cananavan agreed only to take on the role if McAlinden would join him, and they became known as the "Two Brians". The story of the Two Brians was documented in Kings for a Day by Niall McCoy. Canavan helped manage the team to successive Ulster SFC titles in 1999 and 2000. With the first of those wins, in 1999, Canavan and McAlinden became the first people to win Ulster SFC titles with their county as both player and manager. Canavan and McAlinden resigned in August 2001.

Canavan played in two All-Ireland SFC semi-finals and managed teams for three All-Ireland SFC semi-finals; however he neither played in nor managed a team in an All-Ireland SFC final.

== Personal life ==
In 2000, Canavan was appointed as full time Community Games Development Officer in Armagh and Louth after getting an injection of 170,000 Irish Pounds. His uncle, Tom Canavan, was previously an SDLP Mayor of Armagh.

Sporting positions
Preceded by Jim McCorry	Armagh Senior Football Joint Manager (with Brian McAlinden); 1995–2001	Succeeded by Joe Kernan
