= Barry O'Hagan =

Armagh Gaelic footballer

John Toal
Personal information
- Born: 1983–1984

Sport
Club
- Years: Club
- Clan na Gael
Inter-county
- Years: County
- 1993–2003: Armagh
Inter-county titles
	Football	Hurling
League titles	1	

Barry O'Hagan (born 1983–1984) is a Gaelic footballer who played for the Clan na Gael club and at senior level for the Armagh county team. He played for his county for ten years, making his league debut against Kerry in 1993, during the 1992–93 season, shortly after playing in the 1992 All-Ireland Minor Football Championship final.

A forward, O'Hagan appeared as a substitute in the 2002 All-Ireland Senior Football Championship final, when Armagh won a first title, having been brought back from retirement by manager Joe Kernan. He retired again after the 2003 All-Ireland Senior Football Championship final, due to the level of travel required as he lived outside the county.
