= Barry O'Shea =

Irish Gaelic footballer

Personal information
- Born: Tralee, County Kerry

Sport
- Sport: Gaelic football
- Position: Full Back
Club
- Years: Club
- 1990's- 2010's: Kerins O'Rahilly's
Club titles
- Kerry titles: 1
Inter-county
Years	County	Apps (scores)
1995 - 2002	Kerry	17 (0-00)
Inter-county titles
- Munster titles: 3
- All-Irelands: 1
- All Stars: 0

Barry O'Shea is a Gaelic footballer from Tralee, County Kerry, Ireland. He played with the Kerins O'Rahilly's club Tralee. He mostly played Full Back on the Kerry and Kerins O'Rahilly's teams.

== Club ==
O'Shea played with the Kerins O'Rahilly's club Tralee. He was full back on the team that won the 2002 Kerry Senior Football Championship, the clubs first since 1957. He also won two Kerry Club Football Championship titles in 2009 and 2010, as well as Kerry County League Div 1 titles three times in 1999, 2006 and 2013.

== Schools ==
Despite being from Tralee went to secondary school in St Brendan's College, Killarney. He won a Corn Uí Mhuirí title in 1992, the schools first since 1986, and later won a Hogan Cup title.

== Colleges ==
After finishing with secondary school he went on to study in Institute of Technology, Tralee. He played on the college football team that won the Sigerson Cup for the first time in 1997. He won a second title with the college in 1998.

== Underage ==
O'Shea joined the Kerry minor team in 1994. He was full back on the team that beat Clare to win the Munster championship for the first time since 1990.He was again full back as Kerry faced Galway in the All-Ireland final. A 0–16 to 1-07 gave Kerry the title and an All-Ireland medal for O'Shea.

He moved on to the Under 21 team in 1995 and had more success. He was Right Corner Back when Kerry beat Waterford to win the Munster title. He later lined out in the All-Ireland final where Kerry faced Mayo. The sides ended level 2–12 to 3-09 and a re-play was needed. Kerry made no mistake second time around winning 3–10 to 2–12. It was O'Sheas first Under 21 All-Ireland medal.

He missed out on the 1996 All-Ireland winning season but was back in 1997. He was at full back when he won his second Munster title after a win over Cork in a replay. A point loss to Meath in the All-Ireland semi-final was his last game at Under 21 level.

== Senior ==
O'Shea joined the Kerry senior team during the 1995 All-Ireland Senior Football Championship. He lined out in Kerry's]first two Munster Senior Football Championship games, as the Kingdom overcame Limerick and Tipperary. He played no part in the Munster final loss to Cork.

He missed out on the 1995/96 National League and the 1996 All-Ireland Senior Football Championship.

He returned during the 1996/97 National League, as Kerry overcameCork in the final and O'Shea picked up a league winners medal. He played his first championship game since 1995 as Kerry beat Tipperary]and Clare to give O'Shea his first Munster Senior Football Championship. He later linedout as Kerry overcame Cavan in the All-Ireland semi-final to book a first All-Ireland final for Kerry since 1986. In the final they faced Mayo in Croke Park. O'Shea played the full game as Kerry won out 0–13 to 1-07 and he added an All-Ireland senior medal to his hall.

He played in all of Kerry's 1997/98 National League games, including the famous game with Cavan in New York. He played Kerry's Munster Senior Football Championship wins over Cork and Tipperary as O'Shea won a second Munster title. In the All-Ireland semi-final faced Kildare and were expected to make a return to the All-Ireland final. However the Leinster champions had a surprise one point win.

By 1999 O'Shea was Kerry's first choice full back and again played in all of that seasons National League games. He was at number 3 once more as wins over Tipperary and Clare seen O'Shea qualify for a third Munster Senior Football Championship final in a row. In the final they faced Cork. On a wet day in Páirc Uí Chaoimh, Kerry only managed four points in a disappointing loss for O'Shea and Kerry.

O'Shea lined out in two of Kerry's National League games in the 1999/00 season before picking up a second knee injury. He missed out on Kerry's 2000 All-Ireland Senior Football Championship winning campaign.

He made his return during the 2001 All-Ireland Senior Football Championship, playing in the Munster Senior Football Championship first round win over Tipperary. It was his only game of the season, and would be his last championship start.

He played his first National League games since 2000 during the 2002 season. He made four appearances during the 2002 All-Ireland Senior Football Championship all as a sub. His last championship game was when Kerry faced Armagh in the 2002 All-Ireland Senior Football Championship Final. Despite Kerry leading at half-time, the Ulster champions won out by a point.

On the back of Kerins O'Rahilly's winning the 2002 Kerry Senior Football Championship, O'Shea was made captain of the Kerry team. He led the team during three National League games that spring. Losses to Cork and Galway and a win over Roscommon. The game with Galway was his last with Kerry, despite being only 27 years old.
