= Colum McKinstry =

Armagh Gaelic footballer (1949–2021)

Personal information
- Born: 1949 Lurgan, Northern Ireland
- Died: 8 August 2021 (aged 71) Armagh, Northern Ireland
- Height: 6 ft 3 in (191 cm)

Sport
- Sport: Gaelic football
- Position: Midfield
Club
- Years: Club
- 1967–1985: Clan na Gael
Club titles
- Armagh titles: 9
- Ulster titles: 3
- All-Ireland Titles: 0
Inter-county
- Years: County
- 1968–1982: Armagh
Inter-county titles
- Ulster titles: 3
- All-Irelands: 0
- NFL: 0
- All Stars: 1

Colum McKinstry (1949 – 8 August 2021) was a Gaelic football manager and player. At club level he played with Clan na Gael and also played at senior level for the Armagh county team throughout the 1970s and 1980s. He usually lined out at midfield.

== Career ==
McKinstry had several successes with the Lurgan-based club Clan na Gael who he represented at senior level between 1967 and 1985. The side won three Ulster Club Championship titles in that period, while he was also on the side that lost the 1974 All-Ireland club final to University College Dublin.

McKinstry joined the Armagh senior football team in 1968 and made his debut in a pre-season tournament involving Armagh, Antrim, Dublin and Sligo. He subsequently established himself on the team where he collected three Ulster Championships, including one as captain of the side in 1982. McKinstry also lined out at midfield in the 1977 All-Ireland final defeat by Dublin. He received an All-Star Award in 1980 and also represented Ulster in the Railway Cup.

McKinstry turned to management after his retirement from playing, beginning with his home club of Clan na Gael. He also had spells in managing the Middletown and Tullysaran.

== Death ==
McKinstry died suddenly at his home on 8 August 2021, aged 71.

== Honours ==
Clan na Gael

- Ulster Senior Club Football Championship: 1972, 1973, 1974
- Armagh Senior Football Championship: 1968, 1969, 1971, 1972, 1973, 1974, 1976, 1980, 1981

Armagh

- Ulster Senior Football Championship: 1977, 1980, 1982 (c)

Sporting positions
Preceded by	Armagh senior football team captain 1982	Succeeded by
