= John Bannon (referee) =

Gaelic football referee

Personal information
- Born: 1963/1964
- Occupation: Sales executive
- Employer: GAA

Sport
- Sport: Gaelic football
- Position: Referee
- Club: Legan Sarsfields

John Bannon (born 1963/1964) is a former inter-county Gaelic football referee, who refereed two All-Ireland SFC finals during the 1990s and 2000s.

He refereed the 1998 All-Ireland Senior Football Championship Final between Galway and Kildare. He also officiated the 2002 All-Ireland Senior Football Championship Final between Armagh and Kerry.

Bannon is a member of the Legan Sarsfields club in County Longford, where he played in midfield - as of 2006 he had won one Senior B Championship, one Intermediate Championship and two Junior Championships. By 2006 he had refereed three Longford Senior Football Championship finals. He is a Vodafone All Star Award winner. Married and a father he is teetotal and was working as a sales executive in Mullingar in 2006. He is interested in all sports and watches cricket. As well as the two All-Ireland SFC finals, he did two All-Ireland Club finals in 1998 and 2000 and the 1997 All-Ireland Minor Football Championship decider. He had done games in 31 counties (except Down) in 2006, as well as in London and Amsterdam, San Diego and Chicago, as well as Hong Kong. Just ahead of half-time in a 2005-round three All-Ireland qualifier, Derry up against Limerick at MacHale Park, he injured himself against Seán Marty Lockhart and had to leave the game and was unable to recover for six weeks.

A former inter-county referee but still doing club games in 2012, Bannon has served as a Leinster Council delegate. By 2004, he was twice Vodafone Referee of the Year, he had also did one Leinster and one Munster final, and played SFC for Legan Sarsfields. Tyrone's manager Mickey Harte criticised him after the 2009 All-Ireland Senior Football Championship semi-final.

Bannon has been outspoken about the treatment of referees. He has also written about refereeing for the Irish Examiner.
