= Clonmore Robert Emmet's GFC =

Armagh-based Gaelic games club

- Roibeard Eiméid CLG, Cluain Mhór
- Founded: 1966
- County: Armagh
- Colours: Green and gold
- Coordinates: 54°28'43"N 6°38'31"W

Playing kits
Standard colours

Clonmore Robert Emmet's Gaelic Football Club (Irish: CLG Roibeard Eiméid, An Chluain Mhór) is a Gaelic Athletic Association club from County Armagh, Northern Ireland. It is part of the Armagh GAA. It is based in the hamlet and townland of Clonmore, in the north-west of County Armagh. It is named in honour of the Irish revolutionary Robert Emmet.

== History ==
A Gaelic football team has existed in the area around from at least 1916, becoming a founding member of the first North Armagh League in 1917. From this time up until 1953 Clonmore's participation in organised Gaelic football was sporadic due to the limited availability of players. However throughout this time there were many successful periods particularly during the 1930s. During these years Clonmore also retained an import role within the administration of the GAA in North Armagh, providing the North Armagh Board with office bearers. The leanest years for the club came between the early 50s and mid 60s when, for more than a decade, Clonmore did not field a team.

The club was reformed in 1966, and adopted the Kerry colours of green and gold, while the earlier Clonmore teams had played in Cavan's blue and white. As of 2016, Clonmore have now fielded for 50 consecutive years of league football in Armagh.

== Gaelic football ==
The men's senior team competes in Junior League (Division 3) of the Armagh All County League. The club competes in the Junior Championship.

Having been defeated in two Junior finals, Clonmore eventually won the county Championship for the first time in 2005, going on to reach the final of the Ulster GAA Junior Club Football Championship. It competed in the Intermediate Championship from 2006-2010. In 2011, the club returned to Junior ranks and was beaten in finals by Éire Og (2011), Annaghmore (2013) and Tullysaran (2015). The Club won the 2016 Junior A League on 12 August 2016 securing a return to Intermediate football for 2017. On 16 October 2016 Clonmore beat Cullyhanna to win the Armagh Junior final for the second time.

Clonmore also provide girls' football from U-14 to Seniors as an amalgamation with Annaghmore Pearses under the name Naomh Labhaoise. In 2019, two Clonmore players, Emma Conlon and Sarah Quigley, were called up to the Senior Armagh Ladies County team.

Underage boys' football is organised through an amalgamation with neighbours Collegeland and Annaghmore. The teams play as Naomh Eoin and have competed well at various levels, usually in division 2, providing a number of County minors and under-21s.

=== Notable players ===
- Brendan Donaghy, player for Armagh (2007–present), and for Ireland in the 2010 International Rules series

=== Honours ===
- Armagh Junior Football Championship (3)
  - 2005
  - 2016
  - 2025

== Facilities ==
The club opened a new building and pitch on 23 May 2010, with a challenge match between Armagh and Galway. GAA President Christy Cooney was guest of honour.
