= Gaelic Football Laochra =

2026 sports video game

- Cover featuring Aidan Forker
- Developer: Buck Eejit
- Publisher: Home Entertainment Suppliers
- Platforms: PlayStation 5; Windows; Xbox Series X/S
- Release: 28 May 2026
- Genre: Sports
- Modes: Single-player, multiplayer

Gaelic Football Laochra is a sports video game developed by independent studio Buck Eejit. The game, which features Gaelic football, was released on PlayStation 5, Windows and Xbox Series X/S on 28 May 2026.

The game is the first Gaelic games video game released on major platforms since 2007. Unlike the previous games, Gaelic Football Laochra is not licensed by the Gaelic Athletic Association (GAA) and does not feature realistic county kits or stadiums. Player names and likenesses are also unlicensed. All-Ireland winning captain and Armagh player Aidan Forker appears in-game and on the cover art.

== Development ==
Buck Eejit Games first announced that it was developing a Gaelic football game slated for release in 2024. The game was developed at its studio in Belfast, Northern Ireland. Originally titled "Gaelic Football '25" and partially funded via a Kickstarter campaign, it was billed as the first GAA-based video game released since 2007.

In May 2025, it was proposed that the game could be released in "summer 2025". In July 2025, the game's developer stated that it was then in its "second round of playtesting". In April 2026, the developers announced that the game was due to be released on 28 May 2026 with Armagh footballer Aidan Forker being the cover star.

== Gameplay ==
There is a career mode, which allows players to choose their own team.

The game also features tournaments and matches for solo play or local competition, along with multiplayer. It also has a creation suite, which allows players to create custom players, kits and clubs. Speaking with BreakingNews.ie in 2023, Peadar McMahon said: "There are over 2,000 clubs in Ireland so getting all of their approval would have been a logistical nightmare".

Commentary in the game is provided by the MidWest Radio presenter Michael D McAndrew.

== Reception ==
Ed Power of The Irish Times gave the game a negative review.
