= Pearse Óg Park =

Stadium in Northern Ireland

- Páirc na Piarsagh Óga
- Location: Armagh, County Armagh, Northern Ireland
- Owner: Armagh GAA
- Field size: 144.5 m x 88 m
- Opened: 2006

Pearse Óg Park (Irish: Páirc na Piarsagh Óga) is a Gaelic Athletic Association stadium in Armagh, Northern Ireland.

== Development of the Park ==
In 2007 Pearse Óg GAC, a Gaelic football club in Armagh City, secured a 30-year lease on a site at Ballycrummy, on the western outskirts of the city. It has developed this area with a playing field the same size as Croke Park, training facilities, floodlighting and changing rooms. The club has plans to build an indoor sports hall costing £500k.

The founding members of Pearse Og, Charlie McQuade, Felix McStravick, Sam Johnson, Gene McStravick, Eugene McKenna, Gerry Cush and the legendary Ulster footballer Big Jim McCullagh, had chosen the club's home ground to be at the Athletic Grounds at Drumarg in the west of the city. However the Athletic Grounds were eventually taken on by the County Board and the Pearse Óg Club moved to its new home.
