= Grange St Colmcille's GAC =

Armagh-based Gaelic games club

St Colmcille's GAC, Grange
- Naomh Colmcille CLG, An Ghráinseach
- Founded: 1943
- County: Armagh
- Colours: Green and white
- Grounds: St Colmcille's Park, Grange (Páirc Naomh Colmcille, An Ghráinseach)

Playing kits
Standard colours

St Colmcille's GAC, Grange (Irish: Naomh Colmcille CLG, An Ghráinseach) is a Gaelic Athletic Association club near Loughgall, County Armagh, Northern Ireland. It is part of Armagh GAA and takes its name from the local Roman Catholic parish. Their ground is St Colmcille's Park, Grange (Irish: Páirc Naomh Colmcille, An Ghráinseach).

The club plays Gaelic football in the Armagh Senior Championship, and also has Ladies' and underage teams.

== History ==
The club was formed at a meeting in 1943. It became inactive in the 1950s, but was revived in 1961 and reorganised in 1965. The club purchased its present playing fields in 1979 and built a clubhouse, substantially extended in the late 1980s. A new floodlit training field was opened in 2011.

== Gaelic football ==
Just after its formation in 1943 Grange joined the North Armagh League. The club won the league in 1947 and 1948, and were runners up in 1949. There was a close rivalry with the Madden club, and disorder during a match in 1947 led to both teams being briefly suspended.

In 1972, the Grange won the County Junior Championship and the 4th Division league title, later being named Armagh Club of the Year. In 1973, they gained promotion to the Intermediate championship and Division 3. The club slipped back but won the Junior Championship again in 1979, also claiming the Division 3 league title. The Grange rose to Division Two and featured in three 1980s Intermediate Championship finals, lifting the Atty Hearty Cup in 1987.

In 1988, the Grange had to amalgamate under-age teams initially with Collegeland and An Port Mór, and from 1989 with Tullysaran O'Connell's GAC and An Port Mór to form St Enda's.

In 1990 the Grange won the 3rd Division league title, and St Enda's the Under-16 Championship. The club won its only Senior Championship match in 1992 before dropping back to and winning the IFC again in 1993 with a 3-point victory over Keady. In 1998 the Seniors again topped League Division 3.

Relegated to the 4th Division in 2004, the Grange returned to the Junior Championship, regaining 3rd Division status in 2007. In 2008 the Seniors reached the Junior Final but were relegated to the 4th Division.

In 2010, Grange won the JFC final and the Sean Quinn Cup, before winning promotion to the Intermediate. The Grange represented Armagh in the Ulster Junior Club Football Championship. The minor team reached the all county final in 2012 only to be defeated by a strong Killeavy team by four points. The men's senior team will compete in the Intermediate League and Championship in 2013. In 2014 the U18 boys amalgamated with both Tullysaran O'Connell's GAC and An Port Mór to form St Enda's this team remained undefeated up until their second last league game against Clann Eireann where the difference was left to the minimum, following this defeat the boys faced Clann Eireann in the championship final which they then turned the defeat around claiming the Div.2 Championship

=== Honours ===
- Armagh Junior Football Championship (3)
  - 1972, 1979, 2010
- Armagh Intermediate Football Championship (3)
  - 1987, 1993, 2019

== Ladies' Gaelic football ==
Ladies' football has been played in the Grange since 1989. St Colmcille's Ladies GAC (colours: blue and white) joined the Armagh All County League in 1991 and in 1996 won Division 2, also reaching the Junior Championship Final, where they were defeated by Clann Éireann. The under-age teams then amalgamated with Tullysaran to form St Enda's, and reached several county finals.

In 2001, the Ladies won the County Junior Championship, defeating Ballyhegan and progressing to the Ulster Club championships. The club also won the 2001 Second Division title.

=== Notable players ===
- Paula Keegan, former Armagh player, County Board officer, Ulster Club Volunteer of the Year 2010
- Patricia McArdle, Former Armagh player
- Dervla Mallon, Former Armagh player and 2 time All Star nominee
- Siobhan Mackle, County Minor player, Ulster Schools All Star

=== Honours ===
- Armagh Ladies' Junior Championship (1)
  - 2001; runners-up 1996
- Armagh Ladies' All-County League Division 2 (2)
  - 1996, 2001
- Armagh Ladies' Intermediate Championship (1)
  - 2013
