= 1977 All-Ireland Senior Football Championship final =

1977 All-Ireland Football Championship final
- Event: 1977 All-Ireland Senior Football Championship
Dublin	Armagh
5–12 (27)	3–6 (15)
- Date: 25 September 1977
- Venue: Croke Park, Dublin
- Referee: John Moloney (Tipperary)
- Attendance: 66,542

The 1977 All-Ireland Senior Football Championship final was the ninetieth All-Ireland Final and the deciding match of the 1977 All-Ireland Senior Football Championship, an inter-county Gaelic football tournament for the top teams in Ireland.

This was one of the 13 consecutive All-Ireland SFC finals contested by either Dublin or Kerry between 1974 and 1986, a period when one of either team always contested the decider.

The game was contested by Armagh and Dublin. Dublin retained the Sam Maguire Cup.

== Pre-match ==
This was Armagh's second ever All-Ireland SFC final. Their previous appearance was in 1953. Dublin had appeared in the previous three finals, winning two of those (1974 and 1976).

== Match ==
This year's final was played on 27 September.

=== Summary ===
Jimmy Keaveney scored 2–6, which was the amount Dublin won by. This final's eight goals is joint most scored in a final, a record shared with the 1948 match.

Joe Kernan scored two of Armagh's goals. Jimmy Smyth captained Armagh.

An early goal by Keaveney and Dublin led by 3–6 to 1–3 at half-time and by 4–8 to 1–3 at one point in the second half before the two Kernan goals; in 2022, Martin Breheny listed it among "five of the worst" All-Ireland SFC finals since 1972.

Armagh would not return to an All-Ireland football decider until 2002.

=== Details ===
==== Dublin ====
- 1 P. Cullen
- 2 G. O'Driscoll
- 3 S. Doherty
- 4 R. Kelleher
- 5 T. Drumm
- 6 K. Moran
- 7 P. O'Neill
- 8 B. Mullins
- 9 B. Brogan
- 10 A. O'Toole
- 11 T. Hanahoe (c)
- 12 D. Hickey
- 13 B. Doyle
- 14 J. Keaveney
- 15 J. McCarthy

Subs used
17 P. Reilly for P. O'Neill
16 A. Larkin for B. Brogan
18 J. Brogan for R. Kelleher

Subs not used
19 P. Gogarty
20 B. Pocock
21 F. Ryder
22 N. Bernard
23 M. Hickey
24 L. Egan
25 D. Maher

Manager
T. Hanahoe

==== Armagh ====
- 1 B. McAlinden
- 2 D. Stevenson
- 3 T. McCreesh
- 4 J. McKerr
- 5 K. Rafferty
- 6 P. Moriarty
- 7 J. Donnelly
- 8 J. Kernan
- 9 C. McKinstry
- 10 L. Kearns
- 11 J. Smyth (c)
- 12 N. Marley
- 13 S. Devlin
- 14 P. Trainor
- 15 P. Loughran

Subs used
J. Loughran for J. Donnelly
S. Daly for N. Marley
F. Toman for J. McKerr
