= Brian McAlinden =

Irish Gaelic footballer

Brian McAlinden (1954 or 1955 (age 71–72)) is an Irish Gaelic footballer who played as the goalkeeper in the 1977 All-Ireland Senior Football Championship Final. He is reputed to be the first goalkeeper to ever use placed kickouts.

== Playing career ==
McAlinden played for the Sarsfields Football Club. He made his inter-county debut in 1975 and played until 1990, under manager Peter Makem. His first appearance was in a challenge match against Longford. Armagh lost the game, with McAlinden conceding several goals. McAlinden was featured in the squad in 1977 when they won the Ulster Senior Football Championship (SFC) final. They then faced Roscommon in the 1977 All-Ireland Senior Football Championship (SFC) semi-final, a game which went to a replay, which McAlinden's team won, sending them into the 1977 All-Ireland SFC Final. McAlinden made a save from John O'Gara that led him to receive an award for "Save of the Season". However, Dublin, the opponent in the final, won that game.

McAlinden would win three Ulster SFC titles before retiring in 1990.

In addition to his inter-county and club involvement, McAlinden played for Ulster in the Railway Cup. He also played for Ireland in the International Rules Series.

He played once for Glenavon against Larne in the Irish League, a game in which his team was defeated by a score of 4–2. He was named as the fifth greatest footballer never to have received a All Star Award.

== Managerial career ==
After his retirement, McAlinden began his management career with Sarsfields. McAlinden quit the role at the end of 1995.

He was appointed joint-manager of his county team from 1995 until 2001, with the help of Brian Canavan, who had retired from Armagh around the same time as McAlinden. They were known as "The Two Brians". Canavan was asked first but would only accept if McAlinden was alongside him. McAlinden was not keen to be involved so soon after finishing with Sarsfields, but Canavan was a close friend, so he accepted.

During this time, Armagh defeated Down in the 1999 Ulster SFC Final. When victory was assured, Oisín McConville tried to chip Down keeper Mickey McVeigh, and McVeigh collected the ball in his arms. McAlinden was furious at McConville for this piece of showmanship and had an argument with him afterward. The win, though, meant they had a game at Croke Park; Armagh lost, however.

Armagh won another Ulster SFC title in 2000, achieving back-to-back title wins. Armagh faced Derry in the final, managed by another of McAlinden's friends, Eamonn Coleman. When he discovered Coleman always liked the dressing room on the left side of St Tiernach's Park, McAlinden put together a plot to get it off him. McAlinden said: "We went up on the Saturday before the final for a dry run. I got talking to the groundsman. I gave him 20 quid and asked him to put our name on the dressing room on the left-hand side and keep the door locked until we arrived on the Sunday. I said: 'See me after the match and I'll give you another 20'". Armagh arrived at St Tiernach's Park and the door was locked, with Derry there before them trying to get in. Coleman objected to McAlinden, and McAlinden pointed out that their name was on the door. The Armagh GAA chairman suggested they head to the opposing dressing room instead, but both Brians stood their ground. There were punches, and then when the door opened, Armagh took the room off Derry. Derry then lost the game as Armagh won the final.

After losing to Kerry in the 2000 All-Ireland SFC semi-final, the squad voted to get rid of the "Two Brians". They resigned in August 2001. McAlinden later returned as a goalkeeping coach under the management of Paul Grimley and Kieran McGeeney. He also managed underage teams.

== Personal life ==
McAlinden grew up in the village of Derrytrasna. He has had a kitchen company in Derrytrasna since 1978. He is married and has children. His son Thomas won an All Ireland Minor Championship medal in 2009 when he was playing for Armagh.

Sporting positions
Preceded by Jim McCorry	Armagh Senior Football Joint Manager (with Brian Canavan); 1995–2001	Succeeded by Joe Kernan
