= Ger Houlahan =

Armagh Gaelic footballer

Personal information
- Native name: Gearóid Ó hUallacháin (Irish)
- Nickname: Houlie
- Born: Armagh, Northern Ireland
- Occupation: Sports Massage Therapist
- Height: 6 ft 2 in (188 cm)

Sport
- Sport: Gaelic football
- Position: Full Forward
Club
- Years: Club
- 198?-200?: Pearse Óg
Club titles
- Armagh titles: 3
Inter-county*
Years	County	Apps (scores)
1984-2000	Armagh	? (13-43)
Inter-county titles
- Ulster titles: 2
- All Stars: 1
- *Inter County team apps and scores correct as of 17:54, 7 April 2009 (UTC); Championship games only..

Gerard Houlahan is an Irish former Gaelic footballer who played at senior level for the Armagh county team from 1984 to 2000. He won two Ulster Senior Football Championship medals and an All Star award. Houlahan played club football for Pearse Óg and won the Armagh Senior Football Championship on three occasions. He was a prolific forward, particularly renowned for his left-foot. Houlahan was also a crowd favourite with the Armagh fans. In 2009 to mark the 125th anniversary of the Gaelic Athletic Association he was named by The Irish News as one of the all-time best 125 footballers from Ulster.

Houlahan played soccer for Sligo Rovers.

== Playing career ==
=== Inter-county ===
Houlahan made his Championship debut for Armagh in 1984. That year he helped Armagh reach the Ulster Senior Football Championship final, but they were beaten by Tyrone. He also suffered Ulster final defeats with the county in 1987 and 1990. Houlahan was awarded an All Star for his performances in the 1993 Championship and was also named best player of that year's Ulster Championship.

Houlahan finally won an Ulster Championship medal in 1999 - making a substitute appearance in the decider against Down. He won a second Ulster title the following year. The subsequent All-Ireland semi-final defeat to Kerry proved to be Houlahan's last appearance in an Armagh jersey. He announced his retirement in January 2001, aged 34. Houlahan has since settled down with his wife, Deirdre and his three children, Caleigh (the oldest), Odhran and the Kyran.

=== Club ===
Houlahan had a successful underage career with Pearse Óg. In 1985 he helped the club win their first-ever Armagh Senior Football Championship, beating local rivals Armagh Harps in the final. He won further Armagh Championships with the club in 1988 and 1992. He also reached the 1988 Ulster Club Championship final with the club, where they were defeated by Burren.

=== Province ===
Houlahan won two Railway Cup medals with Ulster.

=== School / college ===
Houlahan, playing centre half forward, helped University of Ulster Jordanstown (UUJ) win the 1986 Sigerson Cup and was named Player of the Tournament.

=== Soccer ===
Houlihan played one season for Sligo Rovers in the League of Ireland.

== Post-playing career ==
In late 2001 Houlahan was called in to help the Ulster rugby team with their handling skills. He had also previously helped Ulster fly-half David Humphreys with his kicking.

Houlahan managed Loughmacrory GFC for one season.

He was appointed Armagh minor manager in late 2002 alongside James Byrne and Alan O'Neill.

Houlihan worked on UTV's Gaelic football coverage in the mid-1990s.
