= Andy McCann (Gaelic footballer) =

Armagh Gaelic footballer

Andrew McCann
Sport
Inter-county
- Years: County
- Armagh
Inter-county titles
- All-Irelands: 1
	Football	Hurling
League titles	1	

Andrew McCann is a Gaelic footballer who played at senior level for the Armagh county team. He was a defender. He wore the number seven jersey during Armagh's appearances in the 2002 and 2003 All-Ireland Senior Football Championship finals.
