= John Toal (Gaelic footballer) =

Armagh Gaelic footballer

Personal information
- Born: 1978–1979
- Occupation: Engineer

Sport
Club
- Years: Club
- Keady
Inter-county
- Years: County
- Armagh
Inter-county titles
- All-Irelands: 1
	Football	Hurling
League titles	1	

John Toal (born 1978–1979) is a Gaelic footballer who played for the Keady club and at senior level for the Armagh county team. A midfielder, he played for seven seasons with Armagh. Philip Loughran displaced him from the team in 2003 but was then injured in early 2005, allowing Toal to return for the 2005 National League campaign. However, Toal then suffered a gruesome leg injury during the 2005 Ulster final, which left him unable to walk, or to work as a quantity surveyor.
