= Aidan Forker =

Armagh Gaelic footballer (born 1992)

Personal information
- Native name: Aodhán Mac Fearchair (Irish)
- Born: 6 April 1992 (age 34)
- Occupation: Teacher

Sport
- Sport: Gaelic football
- Position: Defender
Clubs
- Years: Club
- Sean MacDermott's GAC, Maghery
Club titles
- Armagh titles: 2
Inter-county
- Years: County
- 2012–2026: Armagh
Inter-county titles
- All-Irelands: 1

Aidan Forker (born 6 April 1992) is a Gaelic footballer who plays for Sean McDermott's, Maghery, and previously with the Armagh county team.

Forker captained Armagh to the 2024 All-Ireland Senior Football Championship, with Galway defeated in the final. He appears on the cover art of the video game Gaelic Football Laochra.

== Inter-county ==
Forker made his inter-county debut against Down in the 2012 Dr McKenna Cup.

He made his championship debut in the 2012 Ulster SFC quarter-final loss to Tyrone.

Armagh manager Kieran McGeeney appointed Forker as team captain in 2024. Thus, Forker was captain when Armagh won the 2024 All-Ireland Senior Football Championship, with a 1–11 to 0–13 win over Galway in the final. He won an All Star at the end of the 2024 season.

At the time Armagh won the 2024 All-Ireland SFC, Forker was vice-principal of Our Lady's Primary School, Tullsaran, and he brought the Sam Maguire Cup there to show the children who were under his care.

In the 2025 National League meeting of Armagh and Donegal at MacCumhaill Park, Forker headbutted Michael Murphy in the 44th minute. This was within moments of Murphy's reintroduction (as a substitute) to inter-county football, and referee Sean Hurson sent Forker off. Forker's headbutt of Michael Murphy was widely compared to Zinedine Zidane's headbutt during the 2006 FIFA World Cup final, though — unlike Zidane's opponent — Murphy stood firm and did not even move.

In October 2026, Forker announced his retirement from inter-county football.

== Honours ==
Armagh

- All-Ireland Senior Football Championship (1): 2024 (c)

Individual

- All Star (1): 2024

Achievements
Preceded by James McCarthy	All-Ireland SFC winning captain 2024	Succeeded by Incumbent
