= 2005 National Football League (Ireland) =

Gaelic football competition

League details
- Dates: 4 February – 2 May 2005
- Teams: 32

League champions
- Winners: Armagh (1st win)
- Captain: Kieran McGeeney
- Manager: Joe Kernan

League runners-up
- Runners-up: Wexford
- Manager: Pat Roe

Other division winners
- Division 2: Monaghan

The 2005 National Football League, known for sponsorship reasons as the Allianz National Football League, was the 74th staging of the National Football League (NFL), an annual Gaelic football tournament for the Gaelic Athletic Association county teams of Ireland.

Armagh beat Wexford in the final to win their first title after losing three previous finals.

Division 2 was won by Monaghan who beat Meath in the final.

== Format ==
The top 16 teams are drawn into Divisions 1A and 1B. The other 16 teams are drawn into Divisions 2A and 2B. Each team plays all the other teams in its section once: either home or away. Teams earn 2 points for a win and 1 for a draw.

The top two teams in Divisions 2A and 2B progress to the Division 2 semi-finals and are promoted. The bottom two teams in Divisions 1A and 1B are relegated. The top two teams in Divisions 1A and 1B progress to the NFL semi-finals.

== Division 1 ==
=== Division 1A Table ===
Compete in Division 1 semi-finals Automatic relegation to Division 2A

Team	Pld	W	D	L	F	A	Diff	Pts
Tyrone	7	5	0	2	8-94	5-83	20	10
Mayo	7	5	0	2	8-98	8-81	17	10
Kerry	7	5	0	2	10-87	7-79	17	10
Dublin	7	4	0	3	7-74	6-84	-7	8
Cork	7	2	2	3	6-77	7-73	-1	6
Offaly	7	2	1	4	8-78	7-93	-12	5
Donegal	7	2	0	5	6-79	8-71	2	4
Westmeath	7	1	1	5	6-67	11-90	-38	3

=== Division 1B Table ===
Compete in Division 1 semi-finals Automatic relegation to Division 2B

Team	Pld	W	D	L	F	A	Diff	Pts
Armagh	7	6	0	1	8-73	4-68	17	12
Wexford	7	5	0	2	12-88	7-82	21	10
Kildare	7	4	0	3	6-88	6-65	23	8
Down	7	4	0	3	7-73	3-84	1	8
Galway	7	3	0	4	8-81	5-71	19	6
Laois	7	3	0	4	2-94	9-76	-3	6
Limerick	7	2	0	5	5-64	5-83	-19	4
Sligo	7	1	0	6	3-70	12-102	-59	2

=== Final ===
1 May 2005

Armagh	1-21 – 1-14	Wexford

Croke Park, Dublin
Referee: Gerry Kinneavy

== Division 2 ==
=== Division 2A Table ===
Compete in Division 2 semi-finals and automatic promotion to Division 1A

Team	Pld	W	D	L	F	A	Diff	Pts
Fermanagh	7	6	0	1	7-90	3-66	36	12
Monaghan	7	4	2	1	6-114	10-59	43	10
Longford	7	3	3	1	9-77	2-78	20	9
Leitrim	7	3	1	3	2-88	4-77	5	7
Carlow	7	3	1	3	6-84	3-102	-9	7
Roscommon	7	2	2	3	2-97	8-75	4	6
Clare	7	1	3	3	7-62	2-75	2	5
London	7	0	0	7	1-39	8-119	-101	0

=== Division 2B Table ===
Compete in Division 2 semi-finals and automatic promotion to Division 1B

Team	Pld	W	D	L	F	A	Diff	Pts
Derry	7	6	1	0	6-114	5-49	68	13
Meath	7	6	1	0	6-103	3-72	40	13
Cavan	7	5	0	2	12-84	4-69	39	10
Antrim	7	4	0	3	7-95	7-79	16	8
Louth	7	2	1	4	4-74	5-82	-11	5
Wicklow	7	2	1	4	6-70	9-86	-25	5
Waterford	7	1	0	6	4-56	12-99	-67	2
Tipperary	7	0	0	7	4-40	4-100	-60	0

=== Final ===
1 May 2005

Monaghan	3-13 – 3-12	Meath

Croke Park, Dublin
Referee: Aidan Mangan
