= Benny Tierney =

Armagh Gaelic footballer

Brendan "Benny" Tierney (Irish: Breandan Ó Tiarnaigh) is a former Gaelic football goalkeeper who played at senior level for the Armagh county team between 1989 and 2002, and also for the Mullaghbawn club.

In the later part of his career, Tierney was known for his colorful goalkeeper shirts.

He is a sports opinion journalist for The Irish News.

== Honours ==
Inter-county

- All-Ireland Senior Football Championship (1) - 2002
- Ulster Senior Football Championship (3) - 1999, 2000, 2002

Club

- Ulster Senior Club Football Championship (1) - 1995
- Armagh Senior Football Championship (1) - 1995
- Armagh Intermediate Football Championship (1) - 1992

== Personal life ==
Tierney is a headmaster of St Peter's primary school in Cloughreagh (close to Newry).
