= Peter Trainor =

English footballer

Personal information
- Full name: Peter Trainor
- Date of birth: 2 March 1915
- Place of birth: Cockermouth, England
- Date of death: 14 October 1979 (aged 64)
- Place of death: Whitehaven, England
- Position: Centre half

Senior career*
Years	Team	Apps	(Gls)
- Workington
1937–1938	Preston North End	0	(0)
1938–1948	Brighton & Hove Albion	71	(4)
1948–19??	Workington		
- * Club domestic league appearances and goals

Peter Trainor (2 February 1915 – 14 October 1979) was an English professional footballer who made 71 Football League appearances for Brighton & Hove Albion playing at centre half or occasional centre forward.

== Life and career ==
Trainor was born in Cockermouth, Cumberland, in 1915. He began his football career with Workington of the North Eastern League and joined Preston North End in 1937, but never played for their first team. He moved on to Brighton & Hove Albion of the Third Division South a few months later, and soon established himself in the team, but the outbreak of the Second World War and consequent abandonment of competitive football for the duration meant he was into his thirties before the resumption. He played occasionally at centre forward after the war, but then lost his place entirely and went back to Workington at the end of the 1947–48 season. Trainor died in Whitehaven, Cumbria, in 1979 at the age of 64.
