= Andy Mallon =

Armagh Gaelic footballer

Personal information
- Native name: Aindriú Ó Mealláin (Irish)
- Born: Armagh, Northern Ireland
- Height: 1.83 m (6 ft 0 in)

Sport
- Sport: Gaelic Football
- Position: Left Corner Back
Club
- Years: Club
- 2001-: Pearse Óg
Club titles
- Armagh titles: 1
Inter-county
- Years: County
- 2003-: Armagh
Inter-county titles
- Ulster titles: 4
- All-Irelands: 0
- NFL: 1
- All Stars: 1

Andy Mallon (Irish Aindriu Ó Maoileoin) is an Irish Gaelic footballer who plays at senior level for the Armagh county team. He plays club football for Pearse Óg.

== Playing career ==
=== Inter-county ===
Mallon made his Armagh senior debut in a 2003 National League game against Donegal. In 2004 he won the Ulster Senior Football Championship with the county.

In 2005 Mallon helped Armagh win the National League – with Mallon playing an excellent game in the final against Wexford. That year Armagh also defended the Ulster Championship. Mallon was awarded an All Star for his performances that season.

2006 saw Mallon earn a third Ulster Championship medal with Armagh. He won the Ulster Championship for a fourth time in 2008.

=== Club ===
Mallon has reached the Armagh Senior Football Championship final on a number of occasions with Pearse Óg, but they have been beaten by Crossmaglen each time. That is until this year, 2009, when Pearse Óg beat Armagh Harps in the final 0.4 v 0.8. They went on to play St Gall's of Belfast in the Ulster Championship. He is now playing for St Finians Swords . His direct influence has brought them to a Championship final and he was instrumental in securing the Junior Championship for them for the first time in 23 years.

== Honours ==
=== County ===
- Ulster Senior Football Championship (4): 2004, 2005, 2006, 2008
- National Football League, Division 1 (1): 2005
- National Football League, Division 2 (1): 2010
- Ulster Under-21 Football Championship (1): 2004
- All-Ireland Under-21 Football Championship (1): 2004

=== Club ===
- Armagh Senior Football Championship (1): 2009

=== Individual ===
- All-Star (1): 2005
- Irish News Ulster All-Star (1): 2005
