= Ballyhegan Davitts GAC =

Armagh-based Gaelic games club

Ballyhegan Davitts GAA Club
- Founded: 1902
- County: Armagh
- Nickname: The Davitts
- Colours: Blue and navy
- Grounds: Ballyhegan Park (Páirc Baile Uí hÁgáin)

Playing kits
Standard colours

Ballyhegan Davitts GAA Club (also "Ballyhegan Davitts Cumann Luthchleas Gael") is a Gaelic Athletic Association club located in central County Armagh, Northern Ireland. It is affiliated with the Armagh GAA and is based in the parish of Kilmore which has two ends: Mullavilly and Stonebridge. It currently competes in football, and Ladies Gaelic Football, at Under 8 to Minor levels. Its Senior Men team competes in the Armagh Junior Football Championship and in the Junior Division of the All-County League.

== History ==
Ballyhegan Davitts was founded in 1902, which makes it one of the oldest clubs in Armagh.

== Football ==
The Senior team featured in the first-ever Armagh Intermediate Football Championship final, in 1964, losing by a goal to Madden. The Davitts have since won the IFC twice, in 1975 (beating Oliver Plunkett's 0–13 to 0-06) and 1997 (beating Collegeland 1–09 to 1-08). The Davitts are also four-time winners of the Junior Championship, in 1955, 1961, 1995 and 2017.

In 2010, the club's Minor team won the Armagh Division 3 County Championship, becoming the club's first ever under-age All-County Champions.

=== Honours ===
Senior Men's Team
- Armagh Intermediate Football Championship (2)
  - 1975, 1997 (runners-up 1964, 1967, 1982, 2004)
- Armagh Junior Football Championship (4)
  - 1955, 1961, 1995, 2017 (runners-up 1950, 1959, 2023)
- Armagh All-County Football League Division 2 (2)
  - 1973, 1996
- Armagh All-County Football League Division 3 (1)
  - 1966
- North Armagh Football League (1)
  - 1941
- McOscar Cup (1)
  - 1941
- Trodden Cup (1)
  - 1941

Senior B team

- North Armagh Football Championship (1)
  - 1975
- Mid Armagh Football Championship (1)
  - 2007
- North Armagh Football League (1)
  - 2000

U18/Minor Boys

- Armagh Junior Football Championship (1)
  - 2010
- Armagh All County Football Championship (1)
  - Runners-Up 1999
- North Armagh Football League (3)
  - 1999, 2003 & 2004
- Mid Armagh Division 3 Football League (1)
  - 2006
- Mid Armagh Division 4 Football League
  - Runners-up 2007, 2008

U16 / Juvenile Boys

- North Armagh Football Championship (1)
  - 1998
- North Armagh Football Championship
  - runners up 2004
- Mid Armagh Football League Division 3 (1)
  - 2007
- Mid Armagh Football League Division 4 (2)
  - 2008, 2009
- Stanley Headley Cup (1)
  - 2001
- Mid Armagh Football Shield (1)
  - 2008 (runners-up 2006, 2007)

U14 Boys

- North Armagh Football Championship (2)
  - 1999, 2004
- North Armagh Football League (1)
  - 2000
- Féile (1)
  - 1999
- Mid Armagh Division 4 Football League (1)
  - 2007 (runners-up 2006)
- Mid Armagh Football Shield
  - runners-up 2007

=== Notable players ===
- Paul McGrane, All-Ireland winner with Armagh in 2002

== Ladies' Gaelic football ==
Ballyhegan Senior Ladies compete in the Armagh Senior League Division 2 and the Senior Championship. The Ladies Team have won the Junior Championship twice, in 2004 and 2017. In 2022, the Ladies won their first ever Intermediate Championship, defeating Mullabrack 6–20 to 1-07.

== Culture ==
The club offers Irish language classes for all ages.

== Facilities ==
The clubrooms host a wide variety of community events.
