= Enda McNulty =

Armagh Gaelic footballer

Personal information
- Native name: Enda Mac an Ultaigh (Irish)
- Born: 1977 (age 48–49) Mullaghbawn, County Armagh
- Occupation: Sport Psychologist
- Height: 5 ft 10 in (178 cm)

Sport
- Sport: Gaelic football
- Position: Full-Back
Clubs
- Years: Club
- Mullaghbawn; Ballyboden St Enda's; Na Fianna
Inter-county
- Years: County
- 1996-2010: Armagh
Inter-county titles
- Ulster titles: 7
- All-Irelands: 1
- NFL: 1
- All Stars: 1

Enda McNulty (born 1977) is a performance coach and former Gaelic footballer.

He played at senior level for the Armagh county team, and won an All Star Award. He played football with his local club Mullaghbawn Cúchullain's in Armagh and at senior level for the Armagh county team from 1996 to 2010. He earned his only All-Ireland medal in 2002, the same year in which he won his All Star award.

He is currently a performance coach. He has worked with athletes and teams including the Leinster and Ireland rugby teams.

== Playing career ==
Born in Mullaghbawn, McNulty played for Mullaghbawn alongside his brother Justin in his early years. Following a move to Dublin, he later played for Ballyboden St Enda's and Na Fianna. He made his debut on the Armagh senior inter-county in 1996, and helped them to their first All-Ireland title in 2002, when they defeated Kerry in the final. He won his only All Star for his efforts that season.

== Performance coach ==
Having received a degree in psychology, McNulty has become a mental performance coach. He has advised a number of athletes and rugby players, including 400m runner David Gillick, and several members of the Ireland rugby union team.
