= Pearse Óg GAC =

Armagh-based Gaelic games club

- CLG Na Piarsaigh Óga
- Founded: 1950
- County: Armagh
- Nickname: The Ógs
- Colours: Green and gold
- Grounds: Pearse Óg Park
- Coordinates: 54°21′07.62″N 6°40′39.05″W

Playing kits
Standard colours

Pearse Óg Gaelic Athletic Club (Irish: Na Piarsaigh Óga) is a Gaelic Athletic Association club in County Armagh, Northern Ireland. 'Na Piarsaigh Óga', which translates as 'the Young Pearses', takes its name from the Irish revolutionaries Pádraic and Willie Pearse. The club's crest includes a sword in flames, a symbol associated with Pádraic Pearse since his editorship of the nationalist newspaper An Claidheamh Soluis, surrounded by the green and gold club colours and a skyline of Armagh city.

== History ==
The club was formed in 1950 as a result of the popular street leagues that were running at the time. The founder members met in Dougan's Loft, Navan Street, Armagh. They included Charlie McQuade, Felix McStravick, Sam Johnson, Gene McStravick, Eugene McKenna, Gerry Cush and the legendary Ulster footballer Big Jim McCullagh, who became the Pearse Ógs' inaugural chairman. The club's name was suggested by Seamy Trainor. Their home ground for many years was the Athletic Grounds at Drumarg in the west of the city.

Pearse Óg won their first Armagh Senior Football Championship title in 1985 defeating local rivals Armagh Harps in the final. The backbone of this team was formed by players who had won the County U-21 Championship in 1976 and back-to-back Minor titles from 1981 to 1983. Prominent members of this team were future All-star Gerard Houlahan, his county teammates Colin Harney and Brian Hughes and team captain Sean Gordon.

In 2002 the Ógs had four players on the Armagh All-Ireland winning panel, Simon Maxwell, Pauric Duffy, Kieran Hughes and Rónán Clarke. Former senior player Eamon Mackle was heavily involved in Armagh's success along with Armagh coach Paul Grimley. In 2007, the Armagh panel added Ógs players Andy Mallon, Ciaran McKinney and Paul Duffy, with Maxwell and Pauric Duffy stepping down.

The club acquired a new ground in 2007, and has developed the site, at Ballycrummy on the western outskirts of the city, as Pearse Óg Park. In 2007 Pearse Óg under-14 had a memorable year winning five trophies including the Mid-Armagh League, Championship and Feile. In 2020 the under-16 girls team went undefeated the whole year winning both the league and championship.

In 2009 Pearse Óg again beat Armagh Harps in the county final by 0–8 to 0–4.

The club reached the 2012 Senior final but lost to the club that had dominated county football for many years, Crossmaglen Rangers.

=== Honours ===
- Armagh Senior Football Championship (4)
  - 1985, 1988, 1992, 2009
- Armagh Intermediate Football Championship (2)
  - 1967, 1973
- Armagh Junior Football Championship (1)
  - 1952

=== Notable players ===
- Rónán Clarke
- Ger Houlahan, Armagh forward 1984–2000, All Star 1993
- Andy Mallon
- Paul Grimley
