= Diarmaid Marsden =

Armagh Gaelic footballer

Sport
- Sport: Gaelic Football
- Position: Forward
Club
- Years: Club
- 1980s-2000s: Clan na Gael
Club titles
- Armagh titles: 2
College
- Years: College
- Queen's University Belfast
College titles
- Sigerson titles: 1
Inter-county
- Years: County
- 1993-2007: Armagh
Inter-county titles
- Ulster titles: 6
- All-Irelands: 1
- NFL: 1
- All Stars: 1

Diarmaid Marsden is a retired Gaelic footballer who played at senior level for the Armagh county team and won an All-Ireland Senior Championship medal in 2002. He was also an All-Star. Marsden won two county titles with his club Clan na Gael and a Sigerson Cup medal with Queen's University Belfast.

== Playing career ==
Marsden was born in Lurgan, County Armagh, and was a member at senior level of the Armagh county team from 1993 until 2007. This was a very successful time for Armagh. He was part of the team to bring Armagh its first All-Ireland title in 2002. He played in the 2003 final, in which he was sent off. He also won six Ulster Senior Football Championships in 1999, 2000, 2002, 2004, 2005 and, 2006. He also won an All Star in 1999 when Armagh made it to the All Ireland semi final for the first time since 1982.

Before joining the senior team, he won an Ulster Minor Football Championship in 1992 and also played in that year’s All-Ireland Minor Football Championship final but lost out to Meath.

In 2000, he was captain of the Queen's University Belfast team that won the Sigerson Cup.

He played football with his local club Clan na Gael in Armagh with whom he won Armagh Senior Football Championships in 1993 and 1994.
