= Jim McCorry =

Gaelic footballer and manager

Sport
- Sport: Football
Inter-county
- Years: County
- Armagh

Jim McCorry is a Gaelic football manager and former player who played at senior level for the Armagh county team. He later managed both Armagh and Down, as well as several club teams, including Mayobridge and Kilcoo, reaching an Ulster Senior Club Football Championship final with both clubs.

== Career ==
McCorry managed Mayobridge to a Down Senior Football Championship (SFC) title in 1999 (the club's first for more than eight decades) and then to an Ulster Senior Club Football Championship (SFC) final in 2001 but the club dispensed with him shortly after that game. He led Kilcoo to a Down SFC and then to victory against Crossmaglen in the Ulster Club SFC. He won an Ulster Club SFC while managing Kilcoo in 2012. He also had a good record while managing Kilcoo in county finals.

The Down County Board appointed McCorry as manager of the county team in 2015 after Tony McEntee turned the role down. Under McCorry's management, Down gained promotion to Division 1 of the National Football League but slipped out of a All-Ireland Senior Football Championship qualifier to Wexford (of Division 4) and McCorry quit as Down manager in 2015. He said his position was "untenable". He quit Down in 2015.

McCorry became involved with the Kieran McGeeney-managed Armagh in 2017, returning to the team he played for and later managed to a National League Final in 1994. In January 2019, he criticised college teams playing in the Dr McKenna Cup. He spent three years back with Armagh, where he was assistant manager, before suddenly departing for personal and family reasons in January 2021.

He was appointed Burren manager in 2022 where he wants to play a more hand passing game and slow things down .

== Personal life ==
McCorry is from Lurgan. He had kidney cancer in 2017 but had recovered by 2020.

Sporting positions
Preceded by ?	Armagh Senior Football Manager; 1991–1995	Succeeded by Brian McAlinden & Brian Canavan
Preceded by James McCartan Jnr	Down Senior Football Manager; 2014–2015	Succeeded by Éamonn Burns
