= Philip Loughran =

Armagh Gaelic footballer

Personal information
- Born: 1980–1981

Sport
Club
- Years: Club
- Clady
Inter-county
- Years: County
- Armagh
Inter-county titles
- All-Irelands: 1
	Football	Hurling
League titles	1	

Philip Loughran (born 1980–1981) is an Irish Gaelic footballer who played for the Clady club and at senior level for the Armagh county team. He displaced John Toal from the Armagh team in 2003. Injury caused him to lose his place to Toal again during the 2005 National League campaign, but then Toal was himself injured during the Ulster final.

Loughran was named in the Ireland squad for the 2004 International Rules Series. By 2006 he was suffering the effects of an Achilles tendon injury. He has a civil engineering degree.
