= Paddy McKeever =

Armagh Gaelic footballer

Sport
Inter-county
- Years: County
- Armagh
Inter-county titles
- All-Irelands: 1
	Football	Hurling
League titles	1	

Paddy McKeever is a Gaelic footballer who played as a forward at senior level for the Armagh county team. By the time he was 23 he had featured in more than 60 games for his county. An All-Ireland winner in 2002, after retiring McKeever became a selector with Armagh.

McKeever received a four-week ban in 2003 following a straight red card offence during a game.
