= Annaghmore Pearses GFC =

Armagh-based Gaelic games club

- CPG Na Piarsaigh Eanach Mór
- Founded: 1915
- County: Armagh
- Colours: Red and white

Playing kits
Standard colours

Annaghmore Pearses Gaelic Football Club (Irish: CPG Na Piarsaigh Eanach Mór) is a Gaelic Athletic Association club from County Armagh, Northern Ireland. It is based in the village and townland of Annaghmore, near Portadown, and is part of Armagh GAA. The club is named in honour of the Irish revolutionaries Pádraic and Willie Pearse.

Annaghmore currently plays Gaelic football in the Armagh Senior Championship. The club's underage teams are amalgamated with Clonmore and Collegeland O'Rahilly's, and play as Naomh Eoin.

== History ==
Annaghmore won the Armagh Junior Football Championship in 1970 and again in 1989. On both occasions this earned promotion to the Intermediate ranks. The high point in Annaghmore's footballing history to date came in 1990, when it reached the final of the Armagh Intermediate Football Championship, only to lose heavily to near neighbours Collegeland.

The club secured another JFC title in 2003, and in 2012 it again reached the JFC final, losing by three points to An Port Mór. Annaghmore won their fourth JFC title in 2013, defeating neighbours Clonmore on a scoreline of 0–12 to 1-05. In the same year, the club attained promotion to the senior ranks for the first time with a second-placed finish in Division Two of the restructured Armagh All County League.

== Honours ==
- Armagh Junior Football Championship (4)
  - 1970, 1989, 2003, 2013
