= Rónán Clarke =

Armagh Gaelic footballer (born 1982)

Personal information
- Native name: Rónán Ó Cléirigh (Irish)
- Born: 5 October 1982 (age 44) County Armagh
- Occupation: Sales executive
- Height: 6 ft 3 in (191 cm)

Sport
- Sport: Gaelic football
- Position: Full Forward
Club
- Years: Club
- ?-present: Pearse Óg GAC
Club titles
- Armagh titles: 1
Inter-county
- Years: County
- 2002–2010: Armagh
Inter-county titles
- Ulster titles: 5
- All-Irelands: 1
- NFL: 1
- All Stars: 2

Rónán Clarke is an Irish Gaelic football manager and former player who represented Armagh. His club football career has been with Armagh city's Pearse Óg GAC.

Ross Carr, the former Down manager, said: "Armagh have the best forward in the country in Rónán Clarke".

== Playing career ==
=== Inter-county ===
Clarke was called up to the Armagh senior panel at a young age and made his inter-county debut against Antrim in 2002. He made his Championship debut in May 2002. That year he helped Armagh win the Ulster Senior Football Championship as well as the county's first ever All-Ireland Senior Football Championship. He scored in seven out of Armagh's eight Championship games that year and contributed three points in the All-Ireland Final. For his performances he was named 2002 Young Footballer of the Year.

In 2003 Armagh once again reached the All-Ireland final, but were defeated by neighbours Tyrone. 2004 saw Clarke and Armagh again win the Ulster Championship.

In 2005 Clarke helped Armagh win the National League, beating Wexford in the final. Later that year he helped Armagh win another Ulster Championship.

Clarke helped Armagh win the 2006 Ulster Championship and was named Irish News Ulster All-Stars Player of the Year. It was the second time he had been selected on the Ulster All-Stars team. He was awarded an All Star award for his 2006 performances with Armagh. He was also named in the 2006 GPA Team of the Year and nominated for GPA Footballer of the Year.

Clarke missed the 2007 season due to a cruciate ligament injury suffered in the 2006 season. He won another Ulster Championship medal with Armagh in 2008 and was awarded another All Star for his performances throughout that year's Championship.

=== Club ===
Clarke helped Pearse Óg win the 2000 Ulster Minor Club Football Championship, which he described as his greatest moment in sport. Clarke has reached the Armagh Senior Football Championship final with Pearse Óg on a number of occasions, but they have been defeated by Crossmaglen each time until 2009, when Clarke helped Pearse Óg defeat Crossmaglen in the quarter-final of the Armagh Senior Football Championship ending Crossmaglens 13-year win streak in the competition. Pearse Óg went on to win the Championship defeating city rivals Armagh Harps on a scoreline of 0–8 to 0–4 earning Clarke his first Senior County medal.

=== International rules ===
Clarke has in the past represented Ireland in the International Rules Series.

=== School ===
Clarke attended St Brigid's High School, moving to Saint Patrick's Grammar School, Armagh where he was on the team that won the Ulster Colleges Championship, the MacRory Cup in 2000. His teammates included Sean Cavanagh, Peter Quigley and Brian Mullen.

== Managerial career ==
In January 2021, having previously managed the Cavan Gaels and Silverbridge clubs in Cavan and Armagh, the Antrim senior football club St James' Aldergrove announced Clarke as their new manager. He currently manages St.Paul's Lurgan

== Honours ==
Armagh

- 5 Ulster Senior Football Championship 2002 2004 2005 2006 2008
- 1 All-Ireland Senior Football Championship 2002
- 1 National Football League Division 1 2005

Pearse ÓG

- 3 Armagh Minor Football Championship 1998 1999 2000
- 1 Ulster Minor Club Football Championship 2000
- 1 Armagh Senior Football Championship 2009
- 1 Armagh Under-21 Football Championship 2001

Awards

- 3 Irish News Ulster All-Star 2005 2006 2008
- 2 GAA GPA All Stars Awards 2006 2008
- 1 All Star Young Footballer of the Year 2002
- 1 Irish News Footballer of the Year 2006

Ireland

- 1 International Rules 2008

School

- 1 MacRory Cup 2000
