= Armagh county football team =

Gaelic football team

Armagh
- Sport: Football
- Irish: Ard Mhacha
- Nickname(s): The Orchard men
- County board: Armagh GAA
- Manager: Kieran McGeeney
- Captain: Aidan Forker
- Home venue(s): Athletic Grounds, Armagh

Recent competitive record
- Current All-Ireland status: Preliminary QF in 2026
- Last championship title: 2024
- Current NFL Division: 1 (6th in 2026)
- Last league title: 2005
First colours	Second colours

The Armagh county football team (/ɑːrˈmɑː/ ar-MAH) represents the Armagh GAA, a county board of the Gaelic Athletic Association, in Gaelic football. The team competes in the three major annual inter-county competitions; the All-Ireland Senior Football Championship, the Ulster Senior Football Championship and the National Football League.

Armagh's home ground is the Athletic Grounds, Armagh. The team's manager is Kieran McGeeney. Their longest-standing rivalry is with Tyrone, another Ulster-based team and one of Armagh's geographic neighbors.

The team last won the Ulster Senior Championship in 2026, the All-Ireland Senior Championship in 2024 and the National League in 2005.

== Colours and crest ==
Armagh's county colours are orange and white. Originally they wore black and amber striped shirts until 1926 when Dominican nuns from Omeath, in County Louth knitted the team a pair of orange and white kits ahead of a Junior clash with Dublin which they have kept since. However, the team wore a predominantly black strip against Kerry in the 2024 All-Ireland Senior Football Championship semi-final.

=== Playing kit ===
Armagh are one of only four GAA counties whose strip is not provided by O'Neills; their playing kit is manufactured by Portadown-based McKeever Sports.

=== Team sponsorship ===
Team sponsors
Years	Sponsor
1991–1993	Carna Transport
1994–1996	Newry Building Supplies
1997–2011	Morgan Fuels
2012–2016	Rainbow Communications
2017–	Simply Fruit

== History ==
=== Foundation ===
Armagh, represented by Armagh Harps, were the second county to win the Ulster Senior Football Championship in 1890, defeating neighbours Tyrone in the provincial final. A subsequent victory in 1903 marked their second Ulster title; however, this would be their last such success for several decades. Between 1904 and 1949, Armagh appeared in 13 further Ulster finals but failed to secure another title, as Antrim and Cavan emerged as dominant forces in the province, although the county did win the 1926 Junior All Ireland title.

The long-awaited breakthrough occurred in 1950, when Armagh defeated Cavan by four points to claim the Ulster Championship. Their journey ended in the All-Ireland semi-final, where they were defeated by eventual champions Mayo. In 1953, Armagh captured another Ulster title, again defeating Cavan. They advanced to the All-Ireland final after overcoming Connacht champions Roscommon in the semi-final but were defeated by Kerry, losing by four points..

Following their 1953 success, Armagh endured a period of decline. They lost the 1954 Ulster final to Cavan and did not return to the final stage until 1961, where they were defeated by All-Ireland champions Down. This marked the beginning of a particularly challenging era for the county.

During this time, the team faced significant difficulties in maintaining player commitment and assembling a competitive panel. Challenges included poor attendance at training sessions and repeated managerial resignations. The struggles culminated in 1973 with a disastrous National League match against Leitrim in Carrick-on-Shannon, where Armagh suffered a humiliating defeat with barely enough players to field a team. The manager and the entire county board resigned shortly afterward, marking the lowest point in the county’s football history.

In response to this crisis, efforts were made to rebuild the team’s structure and instil a renewed sense of commitment among players. By 1975, these measures began to show results, and in 1977, Armagh reached the All-Ireland final. The 1977 All-Ireland Senior Football Championship final marked Armagh’s second appearance at this stage. Under the captaincy of Jimmy Smyth, they faced a formidable Dublin team. Joe Kernan scored two goals for Armagh, but Dublin’s Jimmy Keaveney contributed 2–6, leading Dublin to a decisive victory.

Subsequently, Armagh captured Ulster titles in 1980 and 1982. However, the county experienced another barren spell, enduring a 17-year wait before claiming their next provincial championship.

=== The Two Brians ===
Brian McAlinden and Brian Canavan led Armagh to back-to-back Ulster Championships in 1999 and 2000, before dropping out at the semi-final stage on both occasions to eventual winners Meath and Kerry respectively. This era also saw the emergence of players like Oisín McConville, Kieran McGeeney and Steven McDonnell.

=== 2002–2006: Joe Kernan's golden era ===
Following Armagh's loss to Galway in the 2001 Championship, the County Board appointed Crossmaglen man Joe Kernan to the managerial post.Kernan instantly delivered, securing the Ulster and All-Ireland titles in his first year.

Kernan resigned in 2007 having won one All-Ireland title and four Ulster Championships.

=== 2007–2014 ===
Peter McDonnell was appointed Armagh managed for the 2007–2009 seasons. During his time as Armagh manager, McDonnell won one Ulster SFC. After a disappointing 2009 campaign which resulted in Armagh being defeated by Tyrone, Peter McDonnell stepped down as Armagh manager.

Paddy O'Rourke, from the neighbouring county of Down, replaced McDonnell as Armagh manager between 2010 and 2012. During this time O'Rourke won the National Football League Division 2 title.

Paul Grimley replaced O'Rourke as Armagh manager for the 2013 and 2014 seasons. Grimley resigned following a one-point defeat to Donegal in the 2014 All-Ireland SFC quarter-final.

=== 2015–present: Kieran McGeeney era ===
Kieran McGeeney became Armagh manager in 2014, starting with NFL promotion to Division 2. In his first Ulster Championship, they lost to Donegal and exited the All-Ireland qualifiers in Round 2.

Armagh were relegated to NFL Division 3 in 2016 and fell to Cavan in the Ulster SFC. In 2017, they narrowly missed NFL promotion but had a strong qualifier run before losing to Tyrone in the All-Ireland quarter-final.

By 2018, Armagh returned to NFL Division 2 but exited the Ulster SFC and All-Ireland qualifiers early. In 2019, McGeeney secured his first Ulster SFC win as manager, beating Down, but they lost the semi-final replay to Cavan and were eliminated by Mayo in the All-Ireland qualifiers. His term was extended by two years.

In 2020, Armagh beat Derry in the Ulster SFC but lost to Donegal in the semi-final. The 2021 NFL saw Armagh retain Division 1 status, but they exited the Ulster SFC after a heavy loss to Monaghan. McGeeney’s term was extended for the 2022 season.

In 2023, Armagh were relegated from Division 1 of the National League and lost both the Ulster final and the All-Ireland Quarter Final on penalties, but McGeeney retained the backing of the county board and was reappointed for 2024.

2024 saw promotion back to Division 1, though Armagh lost both the Division 2 final and the Ulster Final to Donegal. In the All-Ireland Series, they defeated Roscommon in the quarter final and Kerry in the semi-final before beating Galway in the final to secure their second All-Ireland Championship.

In 2025, Armagh retained their Division One status with wins against Dublin, Tyrone and Derry, a draw with Mayo and a loss to Galway.

== Management team ==
Appointed in August 2014, given a two-year extension with a one-year extra option in August 2019, given further extension in 2023, some additions noted.

- Manager: Kieran McGeeney
- Assistant manager: Ciarán McKeever
  - Assistant manager until end of 2020 season: Jim McCorry
- Goalkeeping coach: Ciaran McKinney
- Others in backroom team: Kieran Donaghy (from December 2020 until July 2025) Conleith Gilligan (from October 2023)
- Strength and conditioning coach: Julia O'Neill

== Panel ==
Team vs Kerry in the 2025 All-Ireland Senior Football Championship Quarter-Final, 29 June 2025

No.	Player	Position	Club
1	Ethan Rafferty	Goalkeeper	Grange
2	Paddy Burns	Right corner-back	Burren
3	Barry McCambridge	Full-back	Clann Éireann
4	Peter McGrane	Left corner-back	Ballyhegan Davitts
5	Ross McQuillan	Right half-back	Cullyhanna
6	Tiernan Kelly	Centre-back	Clann Éireann
7	Jarly Óg Burns	Left half-back	Silverbridge
8	Niall Grimley	Midfield	Madden
9	Ben Crealey	Midfield	Maghery
10	Darragh McMullan	Right half-forward	Madden
11	Rory Grugan	Centre-forward	Ballymacnab
12	Joe McElroy	Left half-forward	Armagh Harps
13	Oisín Conaty	Right corner-forward	Tír na nÓg
14	Andrew Murnin	Full-forward	St Paul's
15	Rian O'Neill	Left corner-forward	Crossmaglen Rangers

No.	Player	Position	Club
16	Blaine Hughes	Goalkeeper	Carrickcruppen
17	Greg McCabe	Centre-back	Shane O'Neill's
18	Aaron McKay	Full-back	Dromintee
19	Aidan Forker (c)	Corner-back	Maghery
20	Connaire Mackin	Wing-back	Shane O'Neill's
21	Shane McPartlan	Midfield	Clan na Gael
22	Conor Turbitt	Corner-forward	Clann Éireann
23	Cian McConville	Corner-forward	Crossmaglen Rangers
24	Jason Duffy	Midfield	Cullyhanna
25	Tomás McCormack	Substitute	Annaghmore
26	Callum O'Neill	Midfield	Belleeks

== Managerial history ==
The era of the two Brians
1995–2001

	NFL	Provincial	All-Ireland	Total
Games played	38	13	5	56
Games won	18	7	2	27
Percentage won	47.37%	53.85%	40.00%	48.22%

Joe Kernan's Golden Era
2002–2006

	NFL	Provincial	All-Ireland	Total
Games played	38	18	14	70
Games won	23	14	10	47
Percentage won	60.53%	77.77%	71.43%	67.14%

Peter McDonnell
2007–2009

	NFL	Provincial	All-Ireland	Total
Games played	21	6	3	30
Games won	10	3	0	13
Percentage won	47.62%	50.0%	0.0%	43.33%

Paddy O'Rourke
2010–2012

	NFL	Provincial	All-Ireland	Total
Games played	22	5	7	34
Games won	10	2	1	13
Percentage won	45.45%	40.00%	14.29%	38.23%

Paul Grimley
2013–2014

	NFL	Provincial	All-Ireland	Total
Games played	14	4	7	25
Games won	4	1	5	10
Percentage won	28.57%	25.00%	71.43%	40.00%

Kieran McGeeney
2015–present

	NFL	Provincial	All-Ireland	Total
Games played	46	8	14	68
Games won	25	2	9	36
Percentage won	54.6%	25%	64.29%	53%

[As of 13 June 2021]

== Players ==
=== Records ===
- Stevie McDonnell is the team's top scorer in National Football League history, finishing his career with 33–282 (381) in that competition.

== Competitive record ==
The following teams won national titles.

Year and competition	Panel	Scoreline
2002 All-Ireland SFC final	Benny Tierney, Enda McNulty, Justin McNulty, Francis Bellew, Aidan O'Rourke, Kieran McGeeney, Andy McCann, Paul McGrane, John Toal, Paddy McKeever, John McEntee, Oisín McConville, Stevie McDonnell, Rónán Clarke, Diarmaid Marsden. Subs: Barry O'Hagan for John McEntee, Tony McEntee	Armagh 1–12 Kerry 0–14

Year and competition	Panel	Scoreline
2005 National League	Paul Hearty; Andy Mallon, Francis Bellew, P. McCormack 0–1; Aaron Kernan 0–1, Kieran McGeeney, Ciarán McKeever; John Toal, Paul McGrane; M. O'Rourke, John McEntee 0–1, Oisín McConville 0–2; Stevie McDonnell 0-10, Rónán Clarke 0–2, B. Mallon 0–4. Subs - Paddy McKeever 1–0, Andy McCann, Justin McNulty, Philip Loughran, Aidan O'Rourke.	Armagh 1–21 Wexford 1–14

Year and competition	Panel	Scoreline
1926 All-Ireland JFC final	C. Morgan, H. Cumiskey, Gene Hanratty, J. Vallely, Joe Harney, J. Maguire, Owen Connolly, J. Corrigan, F. McAvinchey, F. Toner, P. Fearon, J. Kernan, H. Arthurs, J. Donaghy, J. McCusker. Sub - J. McEntee for McAvinchey.	Armagh 4–11 Dublin 0–4

Year and competition	Panel	Scoreline
2004 All-Ireland Under-21 FC final	G. Wilson, G. Smyth, F. Moriarty, Andy Mallon, Aaron Kernan, Ciarán McKeever, B. McDonald, M. Mackin, G. Swift, G. Loughran, S. Kernan, P. Toal, M. McNamee, R. Austin, B. Mallon. Subs - P. Duffy, B. Toner, J. Murtagh, M. Moore, S. O'Neill.	Armagh 2–8 Mayo 1–9

Year and competition	Panel	Scoreline
1949 All-Ireland MFC final	L. McCorry, E. McCann, J. Brattan, J. McKnight, F. Kernan, B. O’Neill, T. McConville, E. Mee, S. Collins, T. Connolly, S. Blaney, J. Cunningham, S. Smith, P.J. McKeever, B. McGrane. Sub - M. McKnight for Collins.	Armagh 1–7 Kerry 1–5
2009 All-Ireland MFC final	S. O'Reilly, K. Downey, R. Finnegan, K. Nugent, D. McKenna, N. Rowland, J. Morgan, P. Carragher (0-1), J. Donnelly, R. Grugan (0-1, 0-1f), A. Murnin (0-1), C. King, R. Tasker (0-3), E. McVerry (0-3, 0-1f), G. McParland. Sub - C. McCafferty for Finnegan '53, T. McAlinden (0-1) for McVerry '54.	Armagh 0–10 Mayo 0–7

== Honours ==
Official honours, with additions noted.

=== National ===
- All-Ireland Senior Football Championship
  - (gold) Winners (2): 2002, 2024
  - (silver) Runners-up (3): 1953, 1977, 2003
- National Football League
  - (gold) Winners (1): 2005
  - (silver) Runners-up (3): 1982–83, 1984–85, 1993–94
- All-Ireland Junior Football Championship
  - (gold) Winners (1): 1926
- All-Ireland Under-21 Football Championship
  - (gold) Winners (1): 2004
- All-Ireland Minor Football Championship
  - (gold) Winners (2): 1949, 2009

=== Provincial ===
- Ulster Senior Football Championship
  - (gold) Winners (15): 1890, 1902, 1950, 1953, 1977, 1980, 1982, 1999, 2000, 2002, 2004, 2005, 2006, 2008, 2026
  - (silver) Runners-up (23): 1891, 1901–02, 1904, 1912, 1917, 1920, 1927, 1928, 1931, 1932, 1934, 1938, 1939, 1949, 1954, 1961, 1981, 1984, 1987, 1990, 2023, 2024, 2025
- Ulster Under-21 Football Championship
  - (gold) Winners (2): 1998, 2004, 2007
- Ulster Minor Football Championship
  - (gold) Winners (11): 1930, 1949, 1951, 1953, 1954, 1957, 1961, 1968, 1992, 1994, 2005, 2009
- Ulster Junior Football Championship
  - (gold) Winners (6): 1925, 1926, 1935, 1948, 1951, 1985
- Dr McKenna Cup
  - (gold) Winners (9): 1929, 1931, 1938, 1939, 1949, 1950, 1986, 1990, 1994
- Dr Lagan Cup
  - (gold) Winners (3): 1954, 1955, 1956
