= Joe Kernan (Gaelic footballer) =

Armagh Gaelic footballer and manager

Personal information
- Nickname: Big Joe
- Born: 8 April 1954 (age 72) Crossmaglen, County Armagh, Northern Ireland

Sport
- Sport: Gaelic football
- Position: Forward
Club
- Years: Club
- 1971–1988: Crossmaglen Rangers
Club titles
- Armagh titles: 5
Inter-county
- Years: County
- 1971–1987: Armagh
Inter-county titles
- Ulster titles: 3
- All-Irelands: 0
- NFL: 0
- All Stars: 2

Joe Kernan (born 8 April 1954) is an Irish former sportsman who played Gaelic football for his local club Crossmaglen Rangers and at senior level for the Armagh county team. in the 1970s and 1980s. Awarded All Stars in 1977 and 1982, he later served as manager of Armagh's senior team, and led them to the 2002 All-Ireland Senior Football Championship title, their first, before retiring in July 2007 after the team lost to Derry. He later managed Ulster and the Ireland international rules team. A biography of his story, titled Joe Kernan: Without a Shadow of Doubt, was published in 2011.

== Early and private life ==
Joe Kernan was born in Dublin, in 1954. The second son in a family of three boys and two girls, his father died when he was just 11 years old and his mother died in late 2007. Kernan was educated locally and later boarded in Omeath and then attended the Abbey Christian Brothers Grammar School in Newry. Following his secondary education there were few employment prospects in Northern Ireland and Kernan considered emigrating to Australia where three of his siblings had already gone. In the end he decided to stay in Crossmaglen and in the 1980s he ran a bar in the town. He closed the pub in the early 1990s and currently works as a self-employed estate agent and mortgage broker. In December 1976 Joe married Patricia Morgan, in 1983 the first of their five sons was born, they are Stephen, Aaron, Tony, Paul & Ross. The four eldest boys are well known due to their successes in football with Crossmaglen Rangers and the Armagh panel.

== Playing career ==
=== Club ===
Kernan played his club football with the Crossmaglen Rangers team and, in time, would become one of the most celebrated players with the club. He won five senior county championship titles between 1971 and 1988. Kernan retired from club football in 1988.

=== Inter-county ===
Kernan made his senior Armagh playing debut in a Dr McKenna Cup game against Donegal in 1971. It took until 1977 for Kernan to have his first major success when he won his first Ulster title. Armagh later played Dublin in the All-Ireland final; however, in spite of Kernan scoring two goals, he still ended up on the losing side. Kernan earned an All-Star award for his performances that year.

In 1980 Kernan won another Ulster medal with Armagh; however, his side were later beaten by Roscommon in the All-Ireland semi-final. A third provincial medal was claimed by Kernan in 1982; however, Armagh fell at the All-Ireland semi-final stage once again. In spite of this he was still presented with a second All-Star award. Kernan continued playing until 1987 when he retired after an Ulster final defeat to Derry. It was his sixth provincial final appearance overall. Kernan also won two National Football League Division 2 in 1976 and 1979.

== Managerial career ==
Joe Kernan
Sport
Club management
- Years: Club
- 1993–2000: Crossmaglen Rangers
	5	4	3
Inter-county management
- Years: Team
- 2001 – 2007 2009 – 2010: Armagh; Galway
Inter-county titles as manager
County	League	Province	All-Ireland
Armagh	1	4	4

=== Crossmaglen Rangers (1) ===
In 1993 Kernan became manager of Crossmaglen Rangers. At the time Crossmaglen football was at an all-time low. Three years later in 1996, after the club had won four under-21 county titles in-a-row, Kernan guided the senior side to a first county championship in 11 years. Crossmaglen went on to claim the Ulster club title before defeating Knockmore to win the 1997 All-Ireland club title. In 1997 and 1998 Kernan guided Crossmaglen to two further county titles. The latter win was later converted into a second set of Ulster and All-Ireland titles. In 1999 Cross captured a fourth county title in-a-row as well as a second successive Ulster title. On St. Patricks Day, 2000 Kernan's side went on to win a third All-Ireland title in four years. Following this victory Kernan decided to retire from club management. He would later return in 2013.

=== Armagh ===
In 1989 Kernan got a first taste of inter-county management when he served as assistant to the Armagh manager, Paddy Moriarty. After Armagh were beaten by the eventual Ulster champions in 1989, 1990 and 1991 Moriarty decided to resign as manager and Kernan also walked away.

In November 2001, Kernan was appointed manager of the Armagh senior football team. No stone was left unturned in preparing the team.

Eight months later Kernan's side later went on to win the 2002 Ulster title. This win allowed them to advance to an All-Ireland quarter-final meeting with Sligo; however, no Armagh team had won a championship game in Croke Park in twenty-five years. Kernan's side defeated Sligo after a replay before disposing of Dublin in the All-Ireland semi-final. At half-time during that match Kernan pulled the first of two famous stunts designed to inspire the team. He produced the old Armagh jersey that he wore in the 1977 All-Ireland final, and told his players that this would be their reward.

In the subsequent 2002 All-Ireland final, Kerry were leading Armagh at the interval. During his half-time speech he pulled the second of those famous stunts when he produced his runners-up plaque from the 1977 All-Ireland final and smashed it in the dressing room. Armagh later went on to defeat Kerry by a single point to win their first All-Ireland title ever.

In the 2003 Championship Armagh reached the All-Ireland final once again, however this time they were beaten by Tyrone.

Kernan's Armagh side recaptured the Ulster Senior Football Championship in 2004 against Donegal in the first ever Ulster final to be held at Croke Park.

In 2005 he guided the county to their first ever National League title, before successfully defending the Ulster Championship against Tyrone. The following year Armagh became the first team since the 1959–1961 Down side to win the Ulster Championship three years in a row.

In Kernan's five seasons in charge, Armagh played 36 Championship games and lost just seven of them, winning 23 and drawing six. The side never lost a Championship replay under him.

His record as manager of Armagh is unequalled and he has confirmed his status as a legend as both a player and manager.

=== Ulster ===
In August 2008, Kernan was announced the new manager of Ulster for the Railway Cup campaign. He replaced Donegal man Brian McEniff who had held the role since 1982.

=== Galway ===
In September 2009, Kernan was announced as the new manager of the Galway senior football team. However, in August 2010, he resigned after a very unsuccessful year with the result of Galway getting knocked out of the championship early by being defeated by Wexford.

=== Crossmaglen Rangers (2) ===
On 27 March 2013, Kernan was reappointed manager of Crossmaglen Rangers.

=== Ireland ===
In late March 2015, Kernan was appointed manager of the Ireland international rules football team for the 2015 Series against Australia.

== Media work ==
Kernan has worked on the BBC's championship coverage.

== Honours ==
Manager

Ireland

1 Compromise Rules Series 2015

Ulster

1 Interprovincial 2013

Armagh

1 All-Ireland Senior Football Championship 2002 5 Ulster Senior Football Championship 2002 2004 2005 2006 2008 1 National Football League Division 1 2005

Club

3 All-Ireland Senior Football Club Championship 1997 1999 2000 3 Ulster Senior Football Club Championship 1996 1998 1999 6 Armagh Senior Football Club Championship 1996 1997 1998 1999 2000 2013 4 Armagh Under-21 Football Club Championship 1993 1994 1995 1996

Achievements
Preceded by John O'Mahony (Galway)	All-Ireland SFC winning manager 2002	Succeeded by Mickey Harte (Tyrone)
Sporting positions
Preceded by Brian McAlinden & Brian Canavan	Armagh Senior Football Manager; 2001–2007	Succeeded by Peter McDonnell
Preceded by Brian McEniff	Ulster Senior Football Manager; 2008	Succeeded by Incumbent
Preceded by Liam Sammon	Galway Senior Football Manager; 2009–2010	Succeeded by Tomás Ó Flatharta
