= Collegeland O'Rahilly's GAA =

Armagh-based Gaelic games club

Collegeland O'Rahilly's GAC
- Uí Raithiligh CLG, An Choláiste
- County: Armagh
- Colours: Royal blue, white

Playing kits
Standard colours

Collegeland O'Rahilly's Gaelic Athletic Club (Irish: Uí Raithiligh CLG, An Choláiste) is a Gaelic football club from County Armagh, Northern Ireland. It is located on the Armagh-Tyrone county border just outside Charlemont and the Moy. Collegeland is part of the Armagh GAA and participates in Naomh Eoin CLG, the joint underage team fielded along with Annaghmore and Clonmore clubs.

== History ==
A club of the same name existed in the early 1900s, playing in black and amber colours, and in the 1930s in green and gold. It went out of existence in the 1940s, but the club was reformed and has remained in existence since 1949. It adopted royal blue as its colour due to the prominence of Cavan football at the time. A driving force in the reformation of the club was Fr William McKnight after whom the current playing facility is named.

The Club won the Armagh Junior championship in 2007, defeating Clady in Armagh. In 1997 and again 2000 it lost the Intermediate final, on each occasion by a single point. The club has reached the county Senior final only once, in 1961 when it defeated Clann Éireann by 4-11 to 4-07.

The clubhouse was attacked by arsonists on 11 January 2008. A hole was drilled in the door of the club and flammable liquid poured inside before being set alight, This form of attack was believed to be a sectarian attack causing smoke damage. The club has since been restored.

In 2014, Collegeland won the division 3 league and were beaten in the junior championship final.

In 2019, Collegeland won the Junior championship beating Derrynoose in the final. They made history with their first ever Ulster championship win.

== Honours ==
- Armagh Minor Football Championship (1): 1956
- Armagh Junior Football Championship (5): 1956, 1988, 2007, 2019, 2024
- Armagh Senior Football Championship (1): 1961
- Armagh Intermediate Football Championship (1): 1990
