= Armagh GAA =

Governing body of the Gaelic games

- Irish: Ard Mhacha
- Nickname(s): The Orchard County
- Province: Ulster
- Dominant sport: Gaelic football
- Ground(s): Athletic Grounds, Armagh
- County colours: Tangerine White

County teams
- NFL: Division 1
- NHL: Division 2B
- Football Championship: Sam Maguire Cup
- Hurling Championship: Nicky Rackard Cup
- Ladies' Gaelic football: Brendan Martin Cup
- Camogie: Nancy Murray Cup

The Armagh County Board (Irish: Cumann Lúthchleas Gael Coiste Chontae Ard Mhacha) or Armagh GAA is one of the 32 county boards of the Gaelic Athletic Association (GAA) in Ireland, and is responsible for the administration of Gaelic games in County Armagh, Northern Ireland.

The county board is responsible for preparing the Armagh GAA teams in the various sporting codes; football, hurling, camogie and handball.

The county football team has won two All-Ireland Senior Football Championships in 2002 and 2024.

== Football ==
=== Clubs ===
The county's most successful football club is Crossmaglen Rangers. Crossmaglen have won the Armagh Senior Football Championship on 45 occasions, the Ulster Senior Club Football Championship on 11 occasions, and All-Ireland Senior Club Football Championship on six occasions.

List of football clubs

Club Name	Irish Name	Senior Armagh Titles	Provincial Titles	All-Ireland	Home stadium
Annaghmore Pearses GFC	CPG Na Piarsaigh Eanach Mór	0	0	0	Páirc an Phiarsaigh/Pearse Park
Armagh Harps GFC	Cláirsigh Ard Mhacha	21	0	0	Páirc na Mainistreach/Abbey Park
Ballyhegan Davitts GAC	Baile Uí hÁgáin	0	0	0	Páirc Baile Uí hÁgáin/Ballyhegan Park
Ballymacnab Round Towers GAC	CLG na gCloigthithe, Baile Mhic an Aba	0	0	0	Páirc na nGael
St Patrick's Carrickcruppen GFC	CLG Naomh Padraig Carraig an Chropain	4	0	0	Pairc Naomh Padraig / St Patrick’s Park
Clady Sean South	CLG Cladaigh Sheáin Sabhat	0	0	0	Clady Sean South Playing Fields
Clan na Gael GAA (Armagh)	CLG Clan na Gael	14	3	0	Davitt Park/Davitt Park
Clann Éireann GAC	CLG Clann Éireann	3	0	0	Páirc Chlann Éireann/Clann Éireann Park
Clonmore Robert Emmet's GFC	Cluain Mhor Roibeard Eimeid	0	0	0	Páirc Roibeaird Emmet/Robert Emmet Park
Collegeland O'Rahilly's GAA	Cluain Mhor Roibeard Eimeid	1	0	0	Páirc an Athar Mhic Neachtain/Father McKnight Park
Crossmaglen Rangers GAC	Raonaithe Crois Mhic Lionnáin	45	11	6	Páirc Naomh Oilibhéar Pluincéid/St Oliver Plunkett Park
Culloville Blues GAC	CLG Na Gormacha, Baile Mhic Choll	0	0	0	Páirc na nGael/Gaelic Park
St Mochua Derrynoose GAC	Naomh Mochua, Doire Núis	0	0	0	Páirc Naomh Mochua/St Mochua’s Park
Dorsey Emmet's GFC	Eiméid na nDoirse	0	0	0	Páirc Ruairí Mhig Aoidh
Dromintee St Patrick's GAC	CLG Naomh Pádraig, Droim an Tí	0	0	0	Páirc Uí Luachra agus Mhic Cathmhaoil
Éire Óg Craigavon GAA	Éire Óg	0	0	0	Bruach na bPéine/Pinebank
Forkhill Peadar Ó Doirnín GAC	CLG Pheadar Uí Dhoirnín, Foirceal	1	0	0	Páirc Pheadair Uí Dhoirnín/Peadar Ó Doirnín Park
Granemore GFC	An Ghraínseach Mhór	0	0	0	Páirc Naomh Muire/Pairc Mhuire
Grange St Colmcille's GAC	Naomh Colmcille CLG, An Ghráinseach	0	0	0	Páirc na Gráinsí/Grange Park
Keady Michael Dwyer's GFC	Ceide Micheal Mac Dubhurs	4	0	0	Páirc Ghearóid Mhic Giolla Fhinnéin/Gerard McGleenan Park
Killeavy St Moninna's GAC	Naomh Moninne, Cill Shléibhe	3	0	0	Páirc Chuimhneacháin Chill Shléibhe/Killeavy Memorial Park
Lissummon GAA	Lios Iomána	0	0	0	Entry needed
Madden Raparees GAC	Ropairí na Madan	0	0	0	Páirc na Ropairí/Raparee Park
Maghery Sean MacDermott's GAC	Seán Mac Diarmaida an Mhachaire	2	0	0	Páirc Fheilimí Uí Adhmaill/Felix Hamill Park
Middletown GAA	Eoghan Rua	0	0	0	Páirc P.J. Uí Néill/P.J. O'Neill Park
Mullabrack O'Donovan Rossa GFC	Ó Donnabháin Rossa an Mhullaigh Bhric	0	0	0	O’Donovan Rossa Park
Mullaghbawn Cúchullain's GFC	Cú Chullain an Mhullaigh Bháin	2	1	0	Páirc Chú Chulainn/Cúchulainn Park
Pearse Óg GAC	Na Piarsaigh Óga	4	0	0	Páirc na Piarsaigh Óga, Baile Chromhtha/Pearse Óg Park, Ballycrummy
Phelim Bradys	CLG Féilim Uí Brádaigh	0	0	0	Páirc Scoile Dhearclaí/Darkley school field
Redmond O'Hanlon's	CLG Réamann Uí hAnluain	0	0	0	Páirc Uí Anluain/O’Hanlon Park
High Moss Sarsfields GFC	CLG Sáirséiligh na Móinte Arda	1	0	0	Páirc an Athar Dónal Mac Eoghain/Father Dan McGeown Park
Shane O'Neill's GAC	CLG Sheáin Uí Néill	2	0	0	Páirc Sheáin Uí Néill/Shane O'Neill's Park
Silverbridge Harps GFC	Clársigh Bhéal Átha an Airgid	0	0	0	Páirc Uí Chaollaí/Keeley Park
St Michael's Killean GFC	Naomh Micheál, An Cillín	0	0	0	McKeever Park Killean, Armagh LGFA County board
St Michael's GAC, Newtownhamilton	CLG Naomh Micheál, Baile Úr	2	0	0	Páirc Naomh Micheál/St Michael’s Park
St Patrick's GFC, Cullyhanna	Naomh Pádraig, Coilleach Eanach	0	0	0	Páirc Padraig/Park Padraig
St Paul's GFC, Lurgan	Naomh Pól CLG	0	0	0	Na Páirceanna Imearthea/The Playing Field
St Peter's	Naomh Peadar's	1	0	0	Páirc Naomh Peadar/St Peter’s Park
Tir na nÓg	Tír na nÓg	0	0	0	Páirc an Athar Uí Raifeartaigh/Father Rafferty Park
Thomas Davis, Corrinshego	CLG Tomás Dáibhis, Cor Fhuinseoige	0	0	0	Cnoc Uí Dheoráin/Doran's Hill
O'Connell's GAC, Tullysaran	Tulach Saráin	0	0	0	Páirc Uí Chonaill/O’Connell Park
St Killian's GAC	CLG Naomh Cillian, Crois Bán	1	0	0	Páirc Naomh Cillian/St Killian’s Park
Wolfe Tone GAC, Derrymacash	De Bhulbh Ton Dhoire Mhic Cais agus Naomh Éanna	0	0	0	Páirc na Ropairí/Raparee Park

=== County team ===
Armagh has a long tradition of football. Several clubs were already in existence before the formation of the County Board in 1889.

Armagh became only the second team to win the Ulster Senior Football Championship in 1890. In the early years of the GAA, a club that won its county championship went on to represent the county and would also wear the county colours. Armagh Harps represented Armagh in the Ulster final, beating Tyrone (Cookstown's Owen Roes), but losing to All-Ireland Champions Cork (Midleton) in the All-Ireland Semi-Final.

Despite early success at provincial level, national success at junior and minor level and All-Ireland final appearances in 1953 and 1977, it took until 2002, under manager Joe Kernan, for the Armagh county team to win a first All-Ireland Senior Football Championship title. The county won the All-Ireland Minor Football Championship, in 1949 and again in 2009, but lost the 1957 All-Ireland Minor Football Championship final to Meath.

Kieran McGeeney took over as manager of Armagh in 2015. In 2024, he led them to a first All-Ireland Senior final since 2003. Armagh won the final to secure the Sam Maguire Cup for the second time, beating Galway 1-11 to 0-13.

== Hurling ==
=== County team ===
Like most counties outside of the game's heartland of Munster and south Leinster, hurling has tended to live in the shadow cast by Gaelic football in Armagh, with the exception of border areas such as Keady, Middletown and Armagh City.

Armagh won the 2010 Nicky Rackard Cup, defeating London by a scoreline of 3–15 to 3–14 at Croke Park on 3 July. The county's minor team won the Ulster Minor Hurling League Division One title and reached the final of the Ulster Minor Hurling Championship. The county's under-21 team also reached the final of the Ulster Under-21 Hurling Championship. In 2011, Armagh reached the Ulster Senior Hurling Championship final for the first time since 1946 and advanced to the Ulster Under-21 Hurling Championship final for a second consecutive year, the first time in team history. Armagh won the 2012 Nicky Rackard Cup, its second time to lift the trophy, defeating Louth by a scoreline of 3–20 to 1–15 at Croke Park on 9 June.

== Camogie ==
The high point in Armagh's camogie history was an appearance in the National Camogie League final of 1995 against Cork, beating Galway and Wexford's first teams en route to the final. It came just one year after they qualified for senior status having won the All-Ireland Intermediate Camogie Championship in 1994, the "Premier Junior" championship for the Kay Mills Cup just twelve months earlier in 1993. The bulk of that team had emerged from an under-16 squad who reached the All Ireland final of 1988.

Armagh won Division 2 of the National Camogie League four times, 1980, 1988, 1993 and 1994, and the Nancy Murray Cup in 2006. Armagh qualified for the All Ireland Minor B final of 2003 and won the Minor C championship in 2011.

Crossmaglen won the 2005 All Ireland junior club title. Keady Lámh Dhearg qualified for the finals in 2006 and 2007. Keady Lámh Dhearg and St Brenda's Ballymacnab have won divisional honours at Féile na nGael. Notable players include young player of the year for 2005 Colette McSorley.

Under Camogie's National Development Plan 2010-2015, "Our Game, Our Passion", five new camogie clubs were to be established in the county by 2015.

Michael Murphy and Pauric Dowdall resigned as managers of the county camogie team; Mattie Lennon was appointed manager in March 2021.

Armagh have the following achievements in camogie.

- All-Ireland Intermediate Camogie Championship (1994)
- All-Ireland Junior Camogie Championship (1993)
- National Camogie League Division 2 (1980, 1988, 1993, 1994)
- Nancy Murray Cup (2006)
- Minor C championship (2011)

== Ladies' football ==
Armagh has a ladies' football team. They have reached one all-Ireland final, losing to Cork in 2006. They won the 2024 national league final against Kerry.
