= 60 Minutes season 57 =

Season of television series

60 Minutes
- Season 57
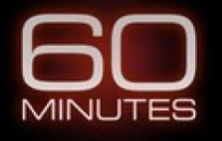
- Logo of 60 Minutes, a CBS news magazine television show broadcast continuously since 1968

Release
- Original network: CBS
- Original release: September 15, 2024 – May 18, 2025

Season chronology
- ← Previous; Season 56 Next → Season 58

60 Minutes' 57th season aired from September 15, 2024, to May 18, 2025. Full-time hosts included Lesley Stahl, Scott Pelley and Bill Whitaker. Reporters include Sharyn Alfonsi, Anderson Cooper, Cecilia Vega and Jon Wertheim. Additional coverage is provided by Norah O'Donnell in Washington, D.C. for episode 2, Holly Williams in Kyiv for episode 9, and Margaret Brennan on cryptocurrencies for episode 13.

The seventh episode on October 27, 2024 received the highest ratings of the season.

== Reception ==
=== Neilsen ratings ===
Season 57 was ranked 49th with U. S. average viewership of 8.7 million. Tied with Law & Order: Special Victims Unit. Starting with the 2024–2025 reason, Nielsen changed from a seven-day to 35-day, cross-platform rating system that measures viewers who may stream or watch linear programming.

== Episodes ==
No. in season	Title	Original release date	Viewers (millions)
1	"The Prosecution of January 6th; Danger in the South China Sea; Dua Lipa"	September 15, 2024	10.477
"The Prosecution of January 6th" Aftermath of the January 6 United States Capitol attack with interview of U.S. Attorney Matthew M. Graves, report by Scott Pelley; "Danger in the South China Sea" interactions between the Philippine Coast Guard and the China Coast Guard in the South China Sea, report by Cecilia Vega. The CBS News crew record the ramming of the Philippine ship BRP Cape Engaño in Sabina Shoal by a Chinese ship.; Interview of Dua Lipa, pop singer, by Anderson Cooper
2	"Scourge of Our Time; The Trustbuster; Inside the Archives"	September 22, 2024	6.601
"Scourge of Our Time" fentanyl deaths in Opioid epidemic in the United States, interviews with Drug Enforcement Administration Administrator Anne Milgram, former Attorney General of New Jersey and Commissioner Troy A. Miller of U.S. Customs and Border Protection at port of San Ysidro, story report by Bill Whitaker; "The Trustbuster" interview of Lina Khan, Federal Trade Commission Chair by Lesley Stahl; "Inside the Archives" report on National Archives and Records Administration with interviews of Colleen Joy Shogan, the Archivist of the United States and Trevor Plante, National Archives Director of Textual Records, by Norah O'Donnell
3	"After the Hurricane; Vladimir Kara-Murza; Welcome to the W; The Mezcaleros"	September 29, 2024	9.565
"After the Hurricane" whistleblowers on insurance fraud claims in Florida after Hurricane Ian, report by Sharyn Alfonsi; Interview with Vladimir Kara-Murza, who won 2024 Pulitzer Prize for Commentary while serving time in prison, by Scott Pelley; "Welcome to the W" report on WNBA players and the league's success with interviews of Caitlin Clark, Napheesa Collier and Aliyah Boston, by Jon Wertheim; "The Mezcaleros" tradition of Mezcal in Oaxaca, Mexico with interviews of brothers Armando Hernandez and Alvaro Hernandez and their father Silverio Hernandez with John Rexer and Gilberto Marquez, report by Cecilia Vega
4	"Election Special"	October 7, 2024	5.7
Interview with Vice President Kamala Harris by correspondent Bill Whitaker; Interview with Gov. Tim Walz running as Vice Presidential candidate for the Democratic Party, correspondent Bill Whitaker; "Belief in the Ballot" Maricopa County influence for Presidential election for the swing state of Arizona; "Last Minute" one year anniversary of October 7 attacks report by Lesley Stahl; The CBS News invitation to President Donald Trump for an interview was declined after initial acceptance. Correspondent Scott Pelley shared behind-the-scenes coverage on attempts to schedule President Trump for this episode. The show moved to Monday night to allow for the American Music Awards 50th anniversary special to air on October 6, 2024. After airing, there was controversy about the preview of the Harris interview shown on "Face the Nation" which used a different edit from one used during the broadcast show. On October 31, 2024, Trump sued CBS in the Amarillo Division of United States District Court for the Northern District of Texas accusing the broadcaster of deceptive trade practices. In February 2025, CBS turned over to the Federal Communications Commission and the public unedited transcripts from the Harris interviews.
5	"Pennsylvania Counts; The Vatican's Orphans; Ballmer's Ballgame"	October 13, 2024	6.975
"Pennsylvania Counts" - Pennsylvania election security with interview with Al Schmidt, Secretary of the Commonwealth of Pennsylvania by Cecilia Vega; "The Vatican's Orphans" - author Maria Laurino on her book, Price of Children, on forced adoptions by the Vatican of Italian children sent to the United States during the 1950s to 1970s. Report by Bill Whitaker; "Ballmer's Ballgame" interview with Steve Ballmer, owner of Los Angeles Clippers, with features of the Intuit Dome interior on display, report by Jon Wertheim
6	"Relief, N.C.; Navalny; The Swingiest County; The Cap Arcona"	October 20, 2024	7.284
"Relief, N.C." clean up efforts after Hurricane Helene in Relief, North Carolina, report by Sharyn Alfonsi; "Navalny" - interview with Yulia Navalnaya, wife of Alexei Navalny with reference to her husband's book Patriot: A Memoir, by Leslie Stahl; "The Swingiest County" - Door County, Wisconsin impact on 2024 United States elections, report by Jon Wertheim; "The Cap Arcona" sinking of SS Cap Arcona in 1945 with interview of historian Bill Niven in Bay of Lübeck, by Bill Whitaker
7	"Deportation; Sanctions; Surfmen"	October 27, 2024	11.193
"Deportation" Trump's position on immigration and proposal for Deportation and removal from the United States with look at operations of Immigration and Customs Enforcement officers in Maryland, interview of Tom Homan, report by Cecilia Vega; "Sanctions" - interview with Daleep Singh on Economy of Russia and Shadow fleet used by Russia to evade sanctions, report by Sharyn Alfonsi; "Surfmen" U.S. Coast Guard surfmen training at National Motor Lifeboat School, Coast Guard Station Cape Disappointment using waters of "Graveyard of the Pacific" at mouth of Columbia River by Bill Whitaker
8	"Election Truth; Unintended Consequences; The Land of Novo"	November 3, 2024	8.168
"Election Truth" - Georgia election officials plan to prevent election fraud and protect poll workers with interviews of Gabriel Sterling, chief operating officer in the office of the Georgia Secretary of State and Brad Raffensperger, the Georgia Secretary of State, correspondent Scott Pelley; "Unintended Consequences" changes to abortion laws with interviews of clinicians in Texas and the impact of Texas Senate Bill 8 including changes to OB-GYN training practices, reported by Sharyn Alfonsi; "The Land of Novo" - growth of Novo Nordisk, maker of Ozempic and Wegovy and impact on Economy of Denmark, report by Jon Wertheim
9	"The Shift; The War Reporter; Robo; Mysterious Russian Deaths"	November 10, 2024	9.039
"The Shift" - 2024 United States presidential election in Pennsylvania support President-elect Trump with interviews of voters from Northampton County, Pennsylvania a region that supported President Biden in the 2020 elections, reported by Scott Pelley; "The War Reporter" Ukrainian reporter Andriy Tsaplienko records events from war with Russia for the news outlet channel 1+1 with part of the segment filmed at Wall of Remembrance in Kyiv, reported by Holly Williams; "Robo" marble-sculpting robots impacting art world with artist Richard Erdma, Giacomo Massari, CEO of commercial company Robotor, and artist Michael Monfroni, a critic of using the technology for sculpting, report by Bill Whitaker; "Mysterious Russian Deaths" violent deaths of Putin foes including Maxim Kuzminov in Spanish resort town Villajoyosa with interview of Michael Weiss, editor for The Insider, report by Cecilia Vega
10	"The Promise; Aussiewood; Bhutan"	November 17, 2024	10.369
"The Promise" identification of 9/11 victims' remains using DNA forensic technologies like cryogenic grinding with interview of Jason Graham, New York City Office of Chief Medical Examiner, and additional evidence like human remains found in 2006 on the roof of Deutsche Bank Building, report by Scott Pelley; " Aussiewood " - Australian actors in American productions with interviews of actor Sarah Snook, who is planning a Broadway production of "The Picture of Dorian Gray" and filmmaker Baz Luhrmann on the National Institute of Dramatic Art in Sydney, report by Jon Wertheim; " Bhutan" Bhutan is building Mindfulness City, report by Lesley Stahl
11	"Disruptor U.; Humans in the Loop; Lowriders of New Mexico"	November 24, 2024	6.786
"Disruptor U." segment on University of Austin with students thoughts on seminar-style classes with open debates, interview with founder Niall Ferguson, report by Jon Wertheim; "Humans in the Loop" workers in Nairobi, Kenya train Artificial intelligence algorithms, report by Lesley Stahl; "Lowriders of New Mexico" lowriders in Española, New Mexico proudly embrace Hispanic American culture and promote a positive community spirit, report by Bill Whitaker
12	"Notre Dame; Smith Island; Kate Winslet; Welcome to the Wedding"	December 1, 2024	9.057
"Notre Dame" reopening of Notre-Dame de Paris after 2019 fire, report by Bill Whitaker; "Smith Island" Threat of climate change on Smith Island, Maryland due to sea level rise, report by Jon Wertheim; Interview with Kate Winslet with actor's portrayal of Lee Miller in the film Lee, report by Cecilia Vega; "Welcome to the Wedding" Fake Afghan wedding to save Afghan citizens after 2021 Taliban offensive, planned by Jason Kander, called "Operation Bella", report by Jon Wertheim (double length segment); Special 90-minute edition
13	"Boeing's Whistleblowers; Big Crypto; A Tutor for Every Student; Thai Elephants"	December 8, 2024	5.655
"Boeing's Whistleblowers" Whistleblower Sam Mohawk discusses Boeing manufacturing and design issues after Boeing 737 MAX groundings and crash of Alaska Airlines Flight 1282, report by Sharyn Alfonsi; "Big Crypto" business of Cryptocurrency and political influence during the 2024 US elections with interview of Brad Garlinghouse, CEO Ripple Labs by correspondent Margaret Brennan; "A Tutor for Every Student" online education opportunities from Khan Academy and OpenAI with reporting by Anderson Cooper; "Thai Elephants" Elephants in Thailand with increasing human-animal conflicts, report by Sharyn Alfonsi; Special 90-minute edition
14	"Road to Damascus; Unveiling; The House of Hermès"	December 15, 2024	7.975
"Road to Damascus" aftereffects of fall of Damascus, report by Scott Pelley; "Unveiling" deceptive use of generative artificial intelligence harmed minors' reputation and privacy with interview of victim, their parent and a lawyer from National Center for Missing & Exploited Children, report by Anderson Cooper; "The House of Hermès" look inside Hermès with Pierre-Alexis Dumas, artistic director for the company, including coverage of Birkin bag, report by Sharyn Alfonsi
15	"The Pager Plot; The Iron River; Joy to the World"	December 22, 2024	8.736
"The Pager Plot" 2024 Lebanon electronic device attacks with interview of agent from Mossad, report by Lesley Stahl; "The Iron River" Smuggling of firearms into Mexico with interviews of former President of Mexico López Obrador and a former agent of the Bureau of Alcohol, Tobacco, Firearms and Explosives who worked in Mexico, report by Sharyn Alfonsi; "Joy to the World" interview of Samara Joy, jazz performer, by Bill Whitaker
16	"The Fires; The FBI Director; The Gaza Policy"	January 12, 2025	6.099
"The Fires" wildfires in Los Angeles, report by Bill Whitaker; "The FBI Director" Interview of Christopher A. Wray, Director of the Federal Bureau of Investigation by Scott Pelley; "The Gaza Policy" interview of former U. S. State Department officials who resigned in protest over the Biden administration's support of Israel in Gaza war, report by Cecilia Vega
17	"What Will Mitch Do?; Robert Lighthizer; A Psychedelic Journey"	February 2, 2025	6.938
"What Will Mitch Do?" Interview of Mitch McConnell on his political positions with input from Michael Tackett, McConnell's biographer, report by Lesley Stahl; Interview of Robert Lighthizer, former Office of the United States Trade Representative on trade policy and tariffs, report by Scott Pelley; "A Psychedelic Journey" veterans with PTSD visit psychedelic retreat in Mexico. Trips paid for by Heroic Hearts Project, report by Anderson Cooper
18	"28 Days; Policing the Internet; Timothée Chalamet"	February 16, 2025	5.592
"28 Days" - U. S. Constitutional challenge to recent changes at the United States Agency for International Development (USAID) with interviews of Andrew Natsios, former administrator of USAID, Senator Chris Coons of Delaware and Steve Vladeck, professor at Georgetown University Law Center, report by Scott Pelley.; "Policing the Internet" - Internet censorship in Germany with interviews of Josephine Ballon, CEO of HateAid, and Renate Künast, German politician, report by Sharyn Alfonsi.; Interview with Timothée Chalamet on his role as Bob Dylan in the film A Complete Unknown with James Mangold, director of the film, report by Anderson Cooper.
19	"The Justice Department; CFPB; John Oliver"	February 23, 2025	6.826
"The Justice Department" - recent resignations at the United States Department of Justice with interview of Peter Keisler, former acting United States Attorney General, report by Scott Pelley; "CFPB" - efforts to halt work at the Consumer Financial Protection Bureau with interview of Rohit Chopra, former CFPB director, former employees and, Norbert Michel at the Cato Institute, report by Lesley Stahl; Interview of John Oliver, host of "Last Week Tonight" with additional input from the show's producers Tim Carvell and Liz Stanton, by Bill Whitaker
20	"Allies and Enemies; Death Flights"	March 2, 2025	5.552 (Note: Broadcast during Super Bowl LIX.)
"Allies and Enemies" - Peace negotiations in the Russian invasion of Ukraine#2025 with interviews of H.R. McMaster, former National Security Advisor and CBS News contributor, U.S. Representative Don Bacon for Nebraska's 2nd District, U.S. Senator Angus King for Maine, report by Scott Pelley; "Death Flights" - Argentine death flights from the 1970s using a short SC.7 Skyvan plane, currently on display at Navy Petty-Officers School, interviews of Giancarlo Ceraudo, photographer and Miriam Lewin, journalist, report by Jon Wertheim (Double length segment)
21	"Firing the Watchdogs; The Settlement; A Method to this Madness"	March 9, 2025	6.076
"Firing the Watchdogs" - dismissals of inspectors general as part of mass layoffs at U. S. federal agencies with interviews of Hampton Dellinger, former Special Council of United States Office of Special Counsel, Paul K. Martin, former Inspector General of the U.S. Agency for International Development, Andrew Bakaj, lawyer, David Kligerman, former U. S. State Department attorney, and Cathy Harris, former board member of United States Merit Systems Protection Board. report by Scott Pelley; "The Settlement" Purdue Pharma in opioid settlement with interviews of Ryan Hampton, member of committee of creditors in lawsuit and activist, and parents of victims, and Rick Mountcastle, former federal prosecutor, report by Cecilia Vega. Purdue Pharma issued a statement to CBS News on the segument.; "A Method to this Madness" - Dan Hurley, head coach of UConn Huskies men's basketball with interviews of Andrea Hurley, wife of coach, report by Jon Wertheim
22	"Under The Radar; America's Own; Werner Herzog"	March 16, 2025	6.917
"Under The Radar" unexplained drone activities over Langley Air Force Base in Virginia, site of many of U.S.’s Lockheed Martin F-22 Raptor stealth fighter jets with interviews of Mark D. Kelly, retired USAF general and former commander of Air Combat Command, Glen D. VanHerck, retired USAF general and former commander of NORAD and NORTHCOM, Senator Roger Wicker representing Mississippi and chairman of the Armed Services Committee, and Gregory Guillot, USAF general and commander of NORAD and NORTHCOM, report by Bill Whitaker; "America's Own", members of The Equity Arc Wind Symphony react to cancellion of concert with the United States Marine Band due to executive order "Ending Illegal Discrimination And Restoring Merit-Based Opportunity" with interviews of student musicians, Stanford Thompson, director of a nonprofit, Cari M. Dominguez, former chair of U. S. Equal Employment Opportunity Commission and former Marine Band members, report by Scott Pelley; "Werner Herzog" - interview with filmmaker Werner Herzog by Anderson Cooper
23	"Death On The Chazy River; Larkin's War; Mr. Clooney Goes To Broadway"	March 23, 2025	8.072
"Death On The Chazy River" - interview with self-described Sinaloa Cartel member claiming responsibility for smuggling migrants across the Canada–United States border with report from Swanton Sector and interviews of David Favro, Sheriff for Clinton County, New York and Kelly Sundberg, research at Mount Royal University, report by Cecilia Vega; "Larkin's War" - Frank J. Larkin, father of former Navy SEAL, Ryan Larkin, on his son's suicide after tours in Iraq and Afghanistan with interview of Brian L Edlow, researcher at Massachusetts General Hospital, and Bryan P. Fenton, U.S. Army General and Commander in Special Operations Command, report by Scott Pelley; "Mr. Clooney Goes To Broadway" interview of George Clooney on his role as Edward R. Murrow in the Broadway adaption of "Good Night, and Good Luck" with interviews of Grant Heslov, collaborator on several projects at Smokehouse Pictures, and Ilana Glazer, actor playing role of Shirley Wershba, report by Jon Wertheim> During the broadcast, Wertheim disclosed that he previously worked with Clooney and Heslov on a film.
24	"Hostages; Voice Of America; Left Behind"	March 30, 2025	8.884
"Hostages" interviews with freed Israeli and American hostages, including Yarden Bibas and Keith Siegel, report by Lesley Stahl; "Voice Of America" recent changes at Voice Of America with interviews of Steven L. Herman and Patsy Widakuswara, two journalists from VOA, and Young Kim, U.S. Representative for California's 40th district, report by Bill Whitaker; "Left Behind" - environmental impact and clean-up of EV batteries damaged from Palisades Fire and Eaton Fire in the Pacific Palisades and Altadena neighborhoods of LA with interviews of a homeowner, a leader of the EPA's Lithium-Ion Battery Emergency Response Team and an officier in the U.S. Army Corps of Engineers, report by Sharyn Alfonsi
25	"The War in Gaza; The Prisoners; Wood to Whiskey"	April 6, 2025	5.669
"The War in Gaza" effect of the Gaza war on children in the Gaza Strip with interviews of Samer Attar, Mansour Ali and Lisa Thornton, doctors, report by Scott Pelley; "The Prisoners" March 2025 American deportations of Venezuelans with interviews of Lindsay Toczylowski, lawyer for detainee, Lee Gelernt, lawyer for American Civil Liberties Union and family member of a detainee, report by Cecilia Vega; "Wood to Whiskey" barrel production with interview of Brad Boswell, executive for a barrel making company, Dan Callaway, master blender at a distillery, Chris Heller, broker for distillers barrels, Jess and Ben Loseke, operators of barrel warehouse, report by Bill Whitaker
26	"Zelenskyy; Greenland; Banana Ball"	April 13, 2025	9.626
President of Ukraine Zelenskyy interview by Scott Pelley; "Greenland" Proposed United States acquisition of Greenland with interviews of Maliina Abelsen, Royal Greenland and former Minister for Finance for Greenland, and Aqqaluk Lynge, president of the Inuit Circumpolar Council, report by Jon Wertheim; "Banana Ball" Savannah Bananas with interviews of Jesse Cole, team owner, and Emily Cole, owner's partner, Tyler Gillum and Adam Virant, coaches, and several team players, report by Leslie Stahl; After the broadcast, President of the United States Trump criticized the CBS News coverage of Ukraine war and Greenland.
27	"Bird Flu; Demis Hassabis; Flight of the Monarch"	April 20, 2025	6.332
"Bird Flu" - Avian influenza being transmitted to cows in recent outbreaks with interviews of Kay Russo, veterinarian, Kamran Khan, infectious disease physician with BlueDot, Keith Poulsen, doctor at USDA Wisconsin Veterinary Diagnostic Lab, and Angela Rasmussen, virologist, report by Bill Whitaker; Demis Hassabis, co-founder and CEO Google DeepMind, interview from 2023 on Project Astra and future of chatbots by Scott Pelley with additional input from Bibo Xu, Google employee, Alex Lee and Giulia Vezzani, researchers; "Flight of the Monarch" monarch butterfly migration with interviews of Jorge Rickards, director at World Wide Fund for Nature (WWF) in Mexico, Court Whelan, guide, Chip Taylor, founder of Monarch Watch, and Eduardo Rendon, also from WWF, report by Anderson Cooper
28	"NIH; Evidence; Land of the Declining Sons"	April 27, 2025	6.689
"NIH" - National Institutes of Health funding freezes with interviews of Francis Collins, former director of NIH, and two researchers, report by Sharyn Alfonsi; "Evidence" - video of the United States Capitol related to September 11 attacks released during lawsuit against the Saudi Arabia government by the families of attacks with interviews of Richard Lambert, retired FBI supervisor and Danny Gonzalez, retired FBI agent, report by Cecilia Vega; "Land of the Declining Sons" - Aging of Japan with interviews of Taro Kono, Japanaese politician, Roland Kelts, writer, Yuriko Koike, Governor of Tokyo, Hanako Okada, Japanese politician, and family that moved to Ichinohe, Iwate, report by Jon Wertheim
29	"The Rule of Law; Freezing the Biological Clock"	May 4, 2025	6.855
"The Rule of Law" targeting of law firms and lawyers under the second Trump administration with interviews of attorneys Marc Elias, Donald B. Ayer, Brenna Frey and John Keker, report by Scott Pelley; "Freezing the Biological Clock" American women freezing unfertilized eggs for future use with interviews of patients, Tomer Singer, Lucky Sekhon and Marcelle Cedars, doctors, and Vardit Ravitsky, researcher, report by Lesley Stahl (double length segment); Last Minute resignation of Bill Owens, executive producer of 60 Minutes
30	"Fraud; To Walk Again; Jamie Lee Curtis"	May 11, 2025	6.097
"Fraud" - Fraud related to U. S. government programs for unemployment insurance, food stamps and diseaster aid with interviews of Linda Miller, investigator, Bryan Vorndran, director of FBI Cyber Division and two victims of freud, report by Cecilia Vega; "To Walk Again" hope for survivors of spinal cord injuries with a method for neuroregeneration at a Swiss lab with interviews of Grégoire Courtine and Jocelyne Bloch, researchers, report by Anderson Cooper, produced by Nichole Marks (duration 13:25); Interview of Jamie Lee Curtis by Sharyn Alfons, produced by Michael Karzis (duration 13:18)
31	"China's Spies; The Future of Warfare; Sounds of Cajun Country"	May 18, 2025	6.415
Season Finale: "China's Spies" Chinese espionage in the United States and China's Ministry of State Security with interviews of Jim Lewis, former U.S. diplomat, Shujun Wang, historian convicted of espionage, Zachary Margulis-Ohnuma and Kevin Tung, lawyers for Wang, Anna Yeung-Cheung and Anna Kwok, activists, report by Norah O’Donnell, produced by Keith Sharman and Roxanne Feitel (duration 13:17); "The Future Of Warfare" - inside Anduril Industries, an American autonomous weapons maker, with founder Palmer Luckey showing the production of the Dive XL submarine and Fury jet fighter, report by Sharyn Alfonsi, produced by Lucy Hatcher (duration 13:28); "Sounds of Cajun Country" Zydeco and Music of Louisiana with interviews of musicians the Savoy family, Chubby Carrier, Jourdan Thibodeaux and Lil' Nate Williams, report by Jon Wertheim, produced by David M. Levine; The segment "The IRS" report by Anderson Cooper and produced by Sarah Koch was not part of the broadcast. This segment was listed before broadcast. The "Sounds of Cajun Country" segment was included.

== Production Staff ==
For most of the season, Bill Owens was the executive producer until he left the show in April 2025. Tanya Simon became the interim executive producer for the remainder of the season. On July 24, 2025, Simon was officially named the executive producer for the show.
