= Sinism =

Sinism may refer to:

- Korean shamanism, from the word sin (Korean: 신; Hanja: 神; lit. god)
- A Chinese worldview, a concept proposed by H. G. Creel

== See also ==
- Cynicism (disambiguation)
