= Political positions of Mitch McConnell =

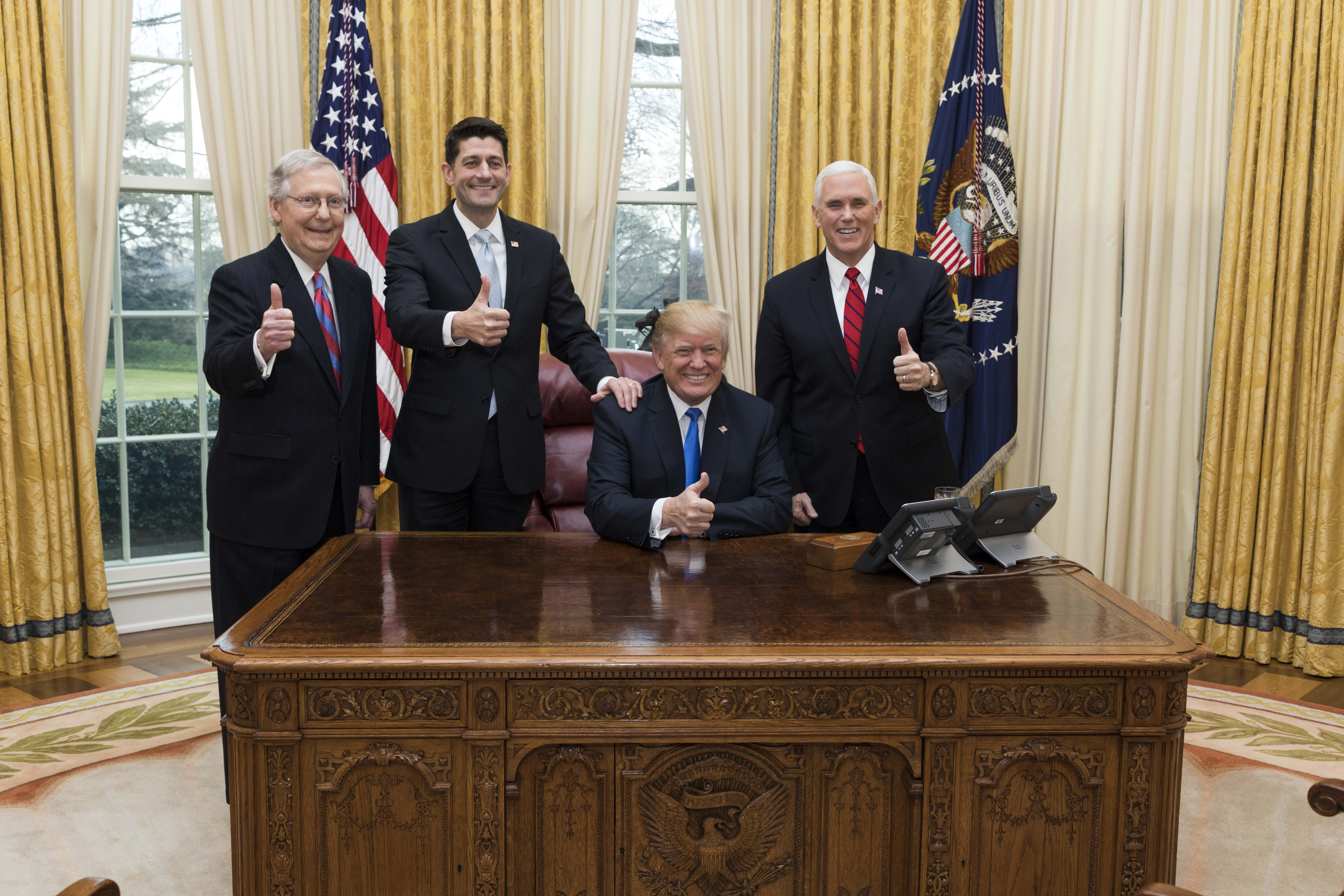
Donald Trump, Mike Pence, Paul Ryan, and McConnell celebrate the passage of the Tax Cuts and Jobs Act of 2017

The political positions of Mitch McConnell are reflected by his United States Senate voting record, public speeches, and interviews, as well as his actions as Senate majority and minority leader. McConnell was known as a pragmatist and a moderate Republican early in his political career, but shifted to the right over time. He led opposition to stricter campaign finance laws, culminating in the Supreme Court ruling that partially overturned the Bipartisan Campaign Reform Act (McCain-Feingold) in 2010 and was influential in opposition to abortion, culminating in the 2022 Supreme Court ruling that overturned Roe V Wade and ended federal abortion protections.

== 9/11 first responders ==
In 2010, McConnell voted against the Zadroga Act, which was designed to provide medical treatment for 9/11 first responders who experienced health complications related to the 9/11 terrorist attacks. McConnell refused to support the bill unless the Bush tax cuts were extended first. In 2015, McConnell blocked legislation seeking to replenish funds for the 9/11 responders, so that it could not go up for a vote in the Senate. McConnell refused to support the bill unless legislation was also passed to lift a U.S. ban on oil exports. Former Daily Show host Jon Stewart, a prominent advocate for the bill, singled out McConnell's role, saying McConnell did not care about anything "other than politics" amid reports that McConnell was holding the bill hostage to get Democrats to meet his demands on unrelated issues.

In 2019, Jon Stewart gave emotional testimony in the House of Representatives, asking for the 9/11 responders' health care funds to be replenished anew. Shortly thereafter, the House approved legislation to renew the health care funds. Stewart subsequently criticized McConnell for not prioritizing passage of the bill in the Senate, saying the issue "has never been dealt with compassionately by Senator McConnell" and that only "under intense lobbying and public shaming has he even deigned to move on it." McConnell responded, saying the legislation would be addressed in the Senate and that "it sounds to me like he is looking for some way to take offense."

== Campaign finance ==
McConnell led opposition to stricter campaign finance regulations, with the Lexington Herald Leader describing it as McConnell's "pet issue." He has argued that campaign finance regulations reduce participation in political campaigns and protect incumbents from competition. In 1990, he led a filibuster against a campaign finance reform bill. He spearheaded the movement against the Bipartisan Campaign Reform Act. His opposition to the bill culminated in the 2003 Supreme Court case McConnell v. Federal Election Commission and the 2010 Citizens United v. Federal Election Commission, the latter of which ruled part of the act unconstitutional. McConnell has been an advocate for free speech at least as far back as the early 1970s when he was teaching night courses at the University of Louisville. "No issue has shaped his career more than the intersection of campaign financing and free speech," political reporter Robert Costa wrote in 2012. In a recording of a 2014 fundraiser McConnell expressed his disapproval of the McCain-Feingold law, saying, "The worst day of my political life was when President George W. Bush signed McCain-Feingold into law in the early part of his first Administration."

On January 2, 2013, the Public Campaign Action Fund, a liberal nonprofit group that backs stronger campaign finance regulation, released a report highlighting eight instances from McConnell's political career in which a vote or a blocked vote (filibuster), coincided with an influx of campaign contributions to McConnell's campaign.

In December 2018, McConnell opposed a Democratic resolution that overturned IRS guidance to reduce the amount of donor information certain tax-exempt groups would have to give the IRS, saying, "In a climate that is increasingly hostile to certain kinds of political expression and open debate, the last thing Washington needs to do is to chill the exercise of free speech and add to the sense of intimidation."

Prior to his Senate run, McConnell favored campaign finance reform, describing money in politics as a "cancer" in 1973.

== Civil rights ==
McConnell attended the 1963 March on Washington for Jobs and Freedom, where Martin Luther King Jr. gave the "I Have a Dream" speech. In 1964, at the age of 22, he attended civil rights rallies, and interned with Senator John Sherman Cooper, a pro-civil rights Republican from Kentucky. He has said his time with Cooper inspired him to run for the Senate later in life. In January 1988, McConnell voted against the Civil Rights Restoration Act of 1987. The bill passed and President Reagan vetoed the bill. McConnell voted against the override attempt by the Senate in March 1988. The veto was overridden and the bill became law regardless.

== Criminal justice reform ==
In late 2018, McConnell stalled the passage of the First Step Act (a bipartisan criminal justice reform bill) in the Senate. As of December 2018, McConnell had yet to endorse the bill, which had been endorsed by President Donald Trump. Democratic Senators Dick Durbin and Kamala Harris stated that McConnell was the only impediment to the bill's passage. The Senate passed the First Step Act on December 18, 2018, and the bill was signed into law by President Donald Trump on December 21, 2018. McConnell voted in favor of the bill. McConnell had been reluctant to call for a vote because the Senate Republican Conference was divided on the bill.

== Economy ==
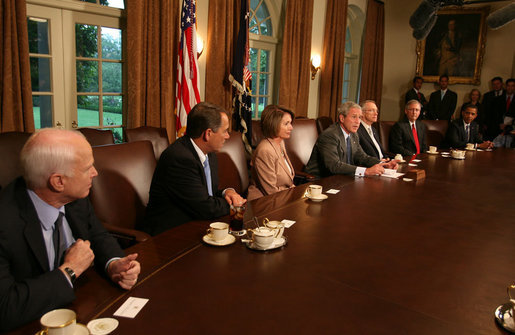
President Bush meets with Congressional members, including McConnell, at the White House to discuss the bailout of the U.S. financial system, September 25, 2008.

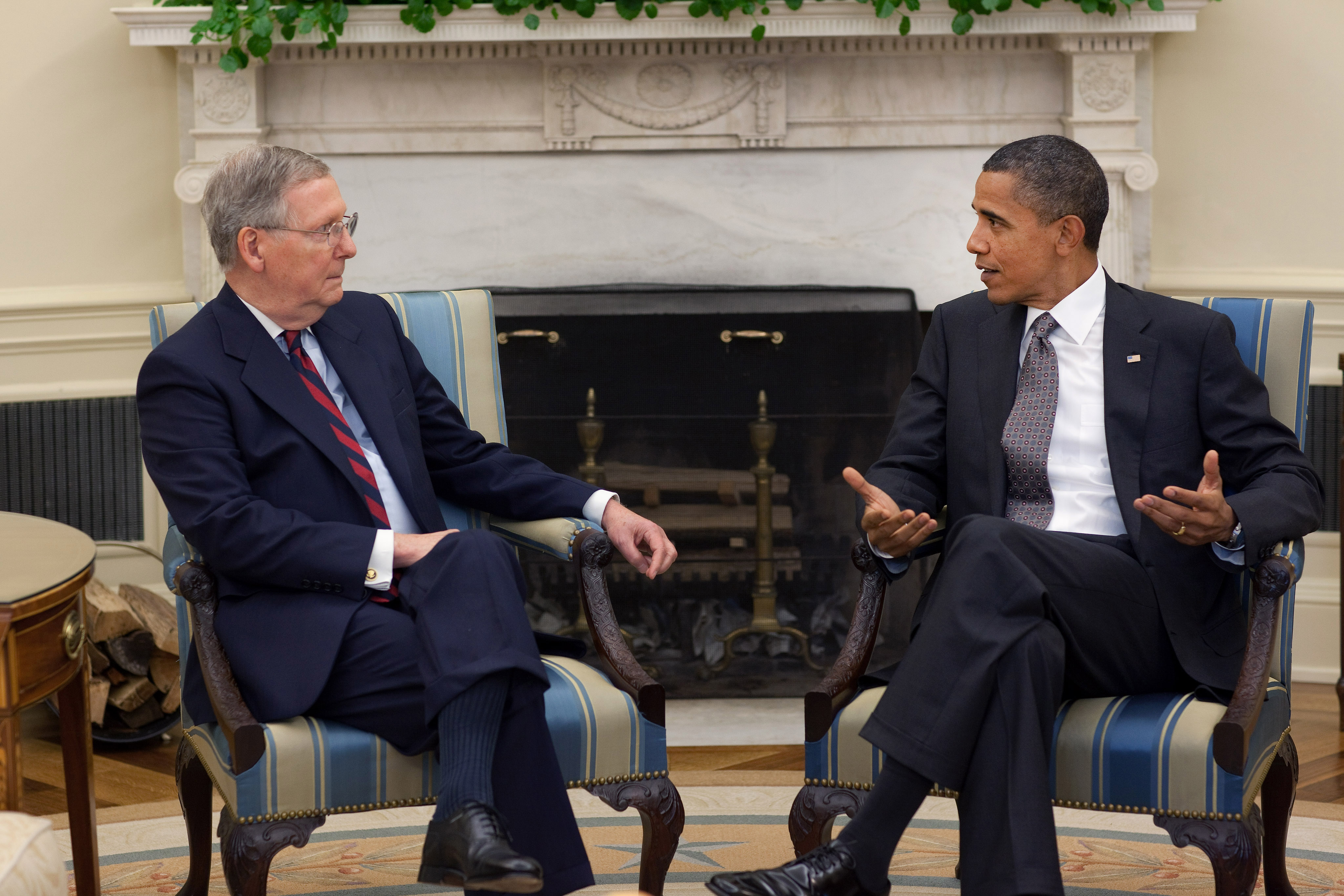
McConnell with President Barack Obama, August 2010

In 2010, McConnell requested earmarks for the defense contractor BAE Systems while the company was under investigation by the Department of Justice for alleged bribery of foreign officials.

In June 2011, McConnell introduced a Constitutional Balanced Budget Amendment. The amendment would require two-thirds votes in Congress to increase taxes or for federal spending to exceed the current year's tax receipts or 18% of the prior year's GDP. The amendment specifies situations when these requirements would be waived.

During the Great Recession, as Congress and the Obama administration negotiated reforms of the banking system, McConnell played an important role in preventing the addition of a provision requiring banks to prefund a reserve intended to be used to rescue insolvent banks in the future. When there appeared to be bipartisan and majority support for such a bank-funded reserve, McConnell criticized the provision, referred to it as a "bailout fund" and turned "opposition to it a litmus test for Senate Republicans", according to one study. According to the study, "McConnell's attack, along with his insistence that opposition would be a matter of party principle, undermined the fragile coalition supporting the prefunded reserve, and the White House – fearing that advocating a bank levy as part of the president's broader reform would enable opponents to kill the whole bill – shelved the idea."

After two intercessions to get federal grants for Alltech, whose president T. Pearse Lyons made subsequent campaign contributions to McConnell, to build a plant in Kentucky for producing ethanol from algae, corncobs, and switchgrass, McConnell criticized President Obama in 2012 for twice mentioning biofuel production from algae in a speech touting his "all-of-the-above" energy policy.

In 2014, McConnell voted to help break Ted Cruz's filibuster attempt against a debt limit increase and then against the bill itself. In 2014, McConnell opposed the Paycheck Fairness Act (a bill that "punishes employers for retaliating against workers who share wage information, puts the justification burden on employers as to why someone is paid less and allows workers to sue for punitive damages of wage discrimination") because it would "line the pockets of trial lawyers", not help women.

In April 2014, under McConnell, Republicans in the Senate voted to kill a minimum wage increase.

In July 2014, McConnell expressed opposition to a U.S. Senate bill that would limit the practice of corporate inversion by U.S. corporations seeking to limit U.S. tax liability.

Under McConnell, the Republican-led Senate voted to pass the Tax Cuts and Jobs Act of 2017.

In 2018, McConnell called for entitlement cuts and raised concern about government deficits. He blamed the deficit on government spending, and dismissed criticisms of the tax cuts bill he passed the year prior, which added more than $1 trillion in debt.

In 2019, McConnell introduced legislation to eliminate the estate tax (which is a tax on inheritances over $11.2 million).

== Election security ==
Prior to the 2016 election, FBI Director James Comey, Secretary of Homeland Security Jeh Johnson, and other officials briefed the leadership of both parties about the Russian interference in the elections. They also urged the leadership to adopt a strong bipartisan statement warning Russia against interference in the election. At the meeting, McConnell "raised doubts about the underlying intelligence and made clear to the administration that he would consider any effort by the White House to challenge the Russians publicly an act of partisan politics." Vice President Joe Biden and Obama's chief of staff later blamed McConnell's opposition for effectively scuttling the proposed bipartisan rebuke; instead they issued a softer, "watered-down" bipartisan joint statement which simply called for additional cybersecurity precautions, and did not mention Russia. Publicly, however, McConnell said in December 2016 that he supported "investigating American intelligence findings that Moscow intervened" in the election.

In November 2017, McConnell opposed legislation that would have protected Special Counsel Robert Mueller while Mueller was conducting an investigation into Russian interference in the 2016 election. In April 2018, McConnell thwarted another bipartisan legislative effort to protect Mueller's job. He said he thought it was unnecessary, as he did not expect the president to fire Mueller. In March 2018, after President Trump criticized Mueller for hiring investigators who were registered as Democrats, McConnell praised Mueller's selection as Special Counsel.

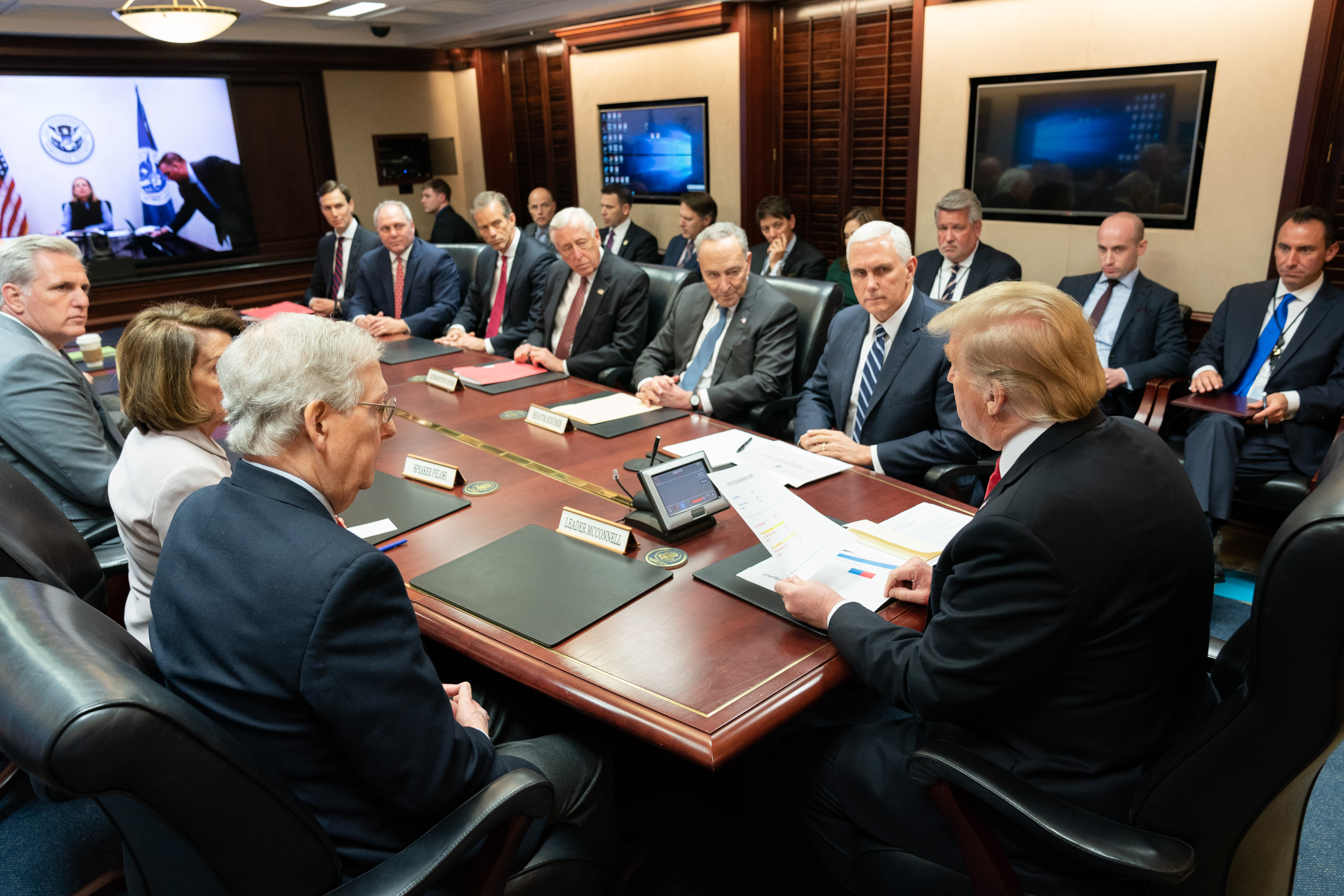
McConnell meets with President Trump and other congressional leaders at the White House in 2019.

After Mueller's Special Counsel investigation concluded that there was "sweeping and systematic" Russian interference in the 2016 elections, several legislative measures were proposed in 2019 to tighten election security, some of which had bipartisan support. McConnell blocked the bills from being voted upon in the Senate, asserting that the sanctions placed against Russia in 2017 and the $380 million Congress had provided to the states in response to Russian interference sufficiently addressed the matter.

== Environment ==
In 1992, after the Intergovernmental Panel on Climate Change had found conclusive evidence that human activities significantly contribute to climate change, McConnell claimed that there was "no conclusive evidence of significant long-term global warming", that there was no scientific consensus on the subject, misleadingly claimed that scientists were alarmed about global cooling in the 1970s, and that climate change mitigation would be "the most expensive attack on jobs and the economy in this country." In 2014, McConnell continued to deny that climate change is a problem, telling the Cincinnati Enquirer editorial board, "I'm not a scientist, I am interested in protecting Kentucky's economy, I'm interested in having low cost electricity." McConnell was the sponsor of the Gas Price Reduction Act of 2008, which would have allowed states to engage in increased offshore and domestic oil exploration. In 2015, McConnell encouraged state governors not to comply with the Obama administration's Clean Power Plan, which was aimed at tackling climate change.

In December 2014, McConnell stated that the incoming Republican-controlled Senate's first priority would be approving the Keystone XL pipeline, announcing his intent to allow a vote on legislation in favor of the pipeline by John Hoeven and his hope "that senators on both sides will offer energy-related amendments, but there will be no effort to micromanage the amendment process." McConnell disputed that the Keystone XL pipeline would harm the environment by citing fellow Republican senator Lisa Murkowski's claim that the US already had 19 pipelines in effect and multiple studies "showing over and over again no measurable harm to the environment." He furthered that the pipeline would create high paying jobs and had received bipartisan support. In February 2015, President Obama vetoed the Keystone XL bill on the grounds that it conflicted "with established executive branch procedures and cuts short thorough consideration of issues that could bear on our national interest". The following month, the Senate was unable to reach a two-thirds majority to override the veto, McConnell afterward stating that the veto represented "a victory for partisanship and for powerful special interests" and "a defeat for jobs, infrastructure, and the middle class."

In November 2016, McConnell requested that President-elect Trump prioritize the approval of the Keystone XL pipeline upon taking office during a meeting and told reporters that President Obama "sat on the Keystone pipeline throughout his entire eight years, even though his own State Department said it had no measurable impact on climate."

McConnell was one of 22 Republican senators to sign a letter urging President Donald Trump to have the United States withdraw from the Paris Agreement. According to OpenSecrets, McConnell has received over $1.5 million from the oil and gas industry since 2012.

== Foreign policy ==
In 1985, McConnell backed anti-apartheid legislation with Chris Dodd. McConnell went on to engineer new IMF funding to "faithfully protect aid to Egypt and Israel," and "promote free elections and better treatment of Muslim refugees" in Myanmar, Cambodia and Macedonia. According to a March 2014 article in Politico, "McConnell was a 'go-to guy' for presidents of both parties seeking foreign aid," but he has lost some of his idealism and has evolved to be more wary of foreign assistance.

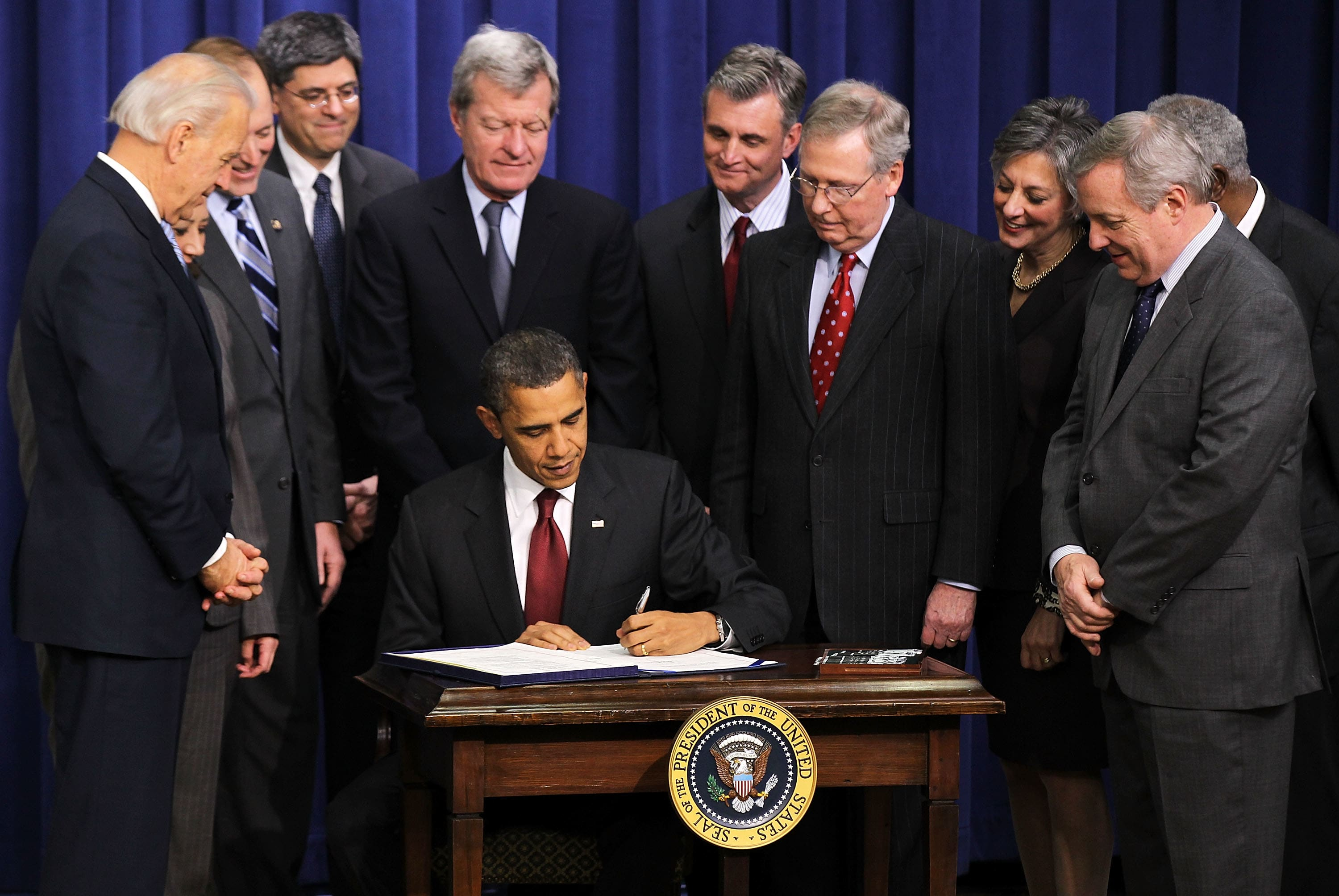
McConnell stands in front and directly to the right of President Obama as he signs tax cut and unemployment insurance legislation on December 17, 2010.

In August 2007, McConnell introduced the Protect America Act of 2007, which allowed the National Security Agency to monitor telephone and electronic communications of suspected terrorists outside the United States without obtaining a warrant.

In April 2017, McConnell organized a White House briefing of all senators conducted by Secretary of State Rex Tillerson. Defense Secretary James Mattis, Director of National Intelligence Dan Coats, and Chairman of the Joint Chiefs of Staff Joseph Dunford regarding threats from the North Korean government. In May 2018, after President Trump called off the North Korea–United States summit, McConnell said that Trump "wanted to make sure that North Koreans understood he was serious, willing to engage, provided they didn't continue to play these kinds of games as they've historically done with other administrations and gotten away with it" and that further progress would be staked on the subsequent actions of North Korea. Trump shortly thereafter announced that the summit could resume as scheduled following a "very nice statement" he received from North Korea and that talks were now resuming. At the Greater Louisville Inc. Congressional Summit, McConnell stated that North Korea would likely pursue "sanctions and other relief" while giving up as little as possible; he added that to achieve a successful negotiation, Trump would "have to not want the deal too much".

In August 2018, McConnell said Myanmar's civilian leader Aung San Suu Kyi, who has been accused of ignoring the genocide of Myanmar's Rohingya Muslim minority, could not be blamed for atrocities committed by the Myanmar's armed forces.

=== Afghanistan ===
McConnell opposed Joe Biden's plan to withdraw all U.S. troops from Afghanistan.

=== Cuba ===
McConnell supported sanctions on Cuba for most of his Senate career, including the trade embargo imposed by the United States during the presidency of John F. Kennedy.

In December 2014, McConnell announced his opposition to the Obama administration's intent to normalize American relations with Cuba, calling it "a mistake" and that Congress would be able to intervene due to multiple sanctions having been implemented into law along with any American ambassador to Cuba requiring Senate approval. McConnell cited the US normalizing relations with Vietnam as its government continued repressing denizens as an example of American engagement sometimes not working.

In a July 2015 interview, McConnell stated that Obama believed that the US would "get a positive result" by merely engaging Cuba and that he saw no evidence that Cuba was changing.

In March 2016, following Obama's travel to Cuba, McConnell said that for Obama "to go down there and act like this is a normal regime, has been embarrassing" while stating that the president believed engagement with Cuba was "going to improve things." After the death of Fidel Castro later that year, McConnell said the passing was an opportunity for the Cuban government to reform itself toward the principles of freedom and democracy, adding that "the oppression" Castro imposed remained in Cuba despite his death.

=== Hungary ===
On 16 May 2024, McConnell blasted the Orban government of Hungary (which was at the time ostensibly a NATO ally) for cozying up to Vladimir Putin's Russia and Xi Jinping's China.

=== Iran ===
In August 2015, McConnell charged President Obama with treating his rallying for support of the Iran nuclear deal "like a political campaign" and stated his preference for senators spending time in their seats while debating the deal: "Demonize your opponents, gin up the base, get Democrats all angry and, you know, rally around the president. To me, it's a different kind of issue." In a September interview, McConnell stated that the battle over the Iran nuclear deal possibly would have to wait until after the Obama administration was over while vowing to tee another vote on the matter to show bipartisan opposition to the matter. He said the Iran nuclear deal would be a defining issue in the following presidential election in the event that the Republicans still did not have enough votes to overcome a filibuster from Democrats and called the deal "an agreement between Barack Obama and the Iranian regime."

In January 2016, as the Senate Foreign Relations Committee weighed consideration of sanctions on North Korea after its test of a nuclear device, McConnell called Iran "an obvious rogue regime with which we have this outrageous deal that they don't intend to comply with" and confirmed the intent of the Senate to look into Iran. In May, McConnell called for Democrats to vote for an underlying spending bill ahead of authorizing the appropriations process to move forward as Democrats opposed the measure on the grounds of a Republican amendment related to Iran. After their third filibuster on the bill, McConnell set up a vote on both the Iran amendment and spending bill.

In May 2018, after President Trump announced the United States was withdrawing from the Iran nuclear deal, McConnell said the deal was "a flawed deal and we can do better" and stated congressional optimism to seeing what Trump would propose in its place.

On 3 January 2020, the high-level Iranian General, Qasem Soleimani, was killed, along with nine others, in a targeted air strike by the United States. The event considerably heightened existing tensions between the two countries. McConnell supported the attack, referring to Soleimani as "Iran's master terrorist".

=== Iraq ===
In October 2002, McConnell voted for the Iraq Resolution, which authorized military action against Iraq. McConnell supported the Iraq War troop surge of 2007. In 2010, McConnell "accused the White House of being more concerned about a messaging strategy than prosecuting a war against terrorism."

In 2006, McConnell publicly criticized Senate Democrats for urging that troops be brought back from Iraq. According to Bush's Decision Points memoir, however, McConnell was privately urging the then President to "bring some troops home from Iraq" to lessen the political risks. McConnell's hometown paper, the Louisville Courier-Journal, in an editorial titled "McConnell's True Colors", criticized McConnell for his actions and asked him to "explain why the fortunes of the Republican Party are of greater importance than the safety of the United States."

Regarding the failure of the Iraqi government to make reforms, McConnell said the following on Late Edition with Wolf Blitzer: "The Iraqi government is a huge disappointment. Republicans overwhelmingly feel disappointed about the Iraqi government. I read just this week that a significant number of the Iraqi parliament want to vote to ask us to leave. I want to assure you, Wolf, if they vote to ask us to leave, we'll be glad to comply with their request."

On April 21, 2009, McConnell delivered a speech to the Senate criticizing President Obama's plans to close the Guantanamo Bay detention camp in Cuba, and questioned the additional 81 million dollar White House request for funds to transfer prisoners to the United States.

In July 2011, following the acquittal of Casey Anthony in the murder of her daughter Caylee, McConnell stated the trial showed "how difficult is to get a conviction in a U.S. court" and advocated for foreign-born terrorists to be sent to Guantanamo Bay.

=== Israel ===
McConnell is a long-standing supporter of Israel. In January 2017, he signed onto a resolution authored by Senators Marco Rubio and Ben Cardin objecting to United Nations Security Council Resolution 2334, which condemned Israeli settlement building in the occupied Palestinian territories as a violation of international law, and calling for all American presidents to "uphold the practice of vetoing all United Nations Security Council resolutions that seek to insert the Council into the peace process, recognize unilateral Palestinian actions including declaration of a Palestinian state, or dictate terms and a timeline for a solution to the Israeli-Palestinian conflict."

McConnell said the Boycott, Divestment and Sanctions movement "is a clear example of rising anti-Israel sentiment in our country which is very disturbing". In 2019, Senator Marco Rubio, who cosponsored the Israel Anti-Boycott Act, introduced the Combating BDS Act, whose original cosponsors include McConnell. The bill is meant to do exactly what the Israel Anti-Boycott Act was meant to do, and enable states to pass anti-boycott legislation with federal blessing.

=== Russia ===
In December 2010, McConnell was one of 26 senators who voted against the ratification of New Start, a nuclear arms reduction treaty between the United States and Russian Federation obliging both countries to have no more than 1,550 strategic warheads as well as 700 launchers deployed during the next seven years along with providing a continuation of on-site inspections that halted when START I expired the previous year. It was the first arms treaty with Russia in eight years.

In 2012, he supported the Magnitsky Act that has allowed the U.S. government to sanction those who it sees as human rights offenders, freezing their assets, and ban them from entering the United States.

On March 27, 2014, McConnell introduced the United States International Programming to Ukraine and Neighboring Regions bill, which would provide additional funding and instructions to Radio Free Europe/Radio Liberty in response to the annexation of Crimea by the Russian Federation.

In September 2016, McConnell was one of 34 senators to sign a letter to United States Secretary of State John Kerry advocating for the United States using "all available tools to dissuade Russia from continuing its airstrikes in Syria" from an Iranian airbase near the city of Hamadan, and stating that there should be clear enforcement by the US of the airstrikes violating "a legally binding Security Council Resolution" on Iran.

In July 2017, McConnell voted in favor of the Countering America's Adversaries Through Sanctions Act that placed sanctions on Russia together with Iran and North Korea.

In January 2018, Senators Marco Rubio and Chris Van Hollen introduced a bipartisan bill that would impose new sanctions on Russia in the event the country attempted interfering in another American election. In July, McConnell mentioned the bill as one option on the table for the Senate and asked the Banking and Foreign Relations panels to hold new hearings on the implementation of the bipartisan Russia sanctions bill from the previous year in addition to suggesting potential further steps lawmakers could pursue as part of efforts to counter Russian malfeasance ahead of that year's midterm elections.

In March 2022, after the 2022 Russian invasion of Ukraine, McConnell stated that Republicans who support Vladimir Putin are “lonely voices” in the Republican party. However, he dodged an invitation to say such Republicans should be ejected from party or face disciplinary measures.

In 2024, McConnell worked "tirelessly for the better part of a year" to move a $95 billion aid bill for Ukraine and Israel in their respective wars. This effort was done despite significant resistance from the far right wing of his party, and in cooperation with Chuck Schumer, the Democratic majority leader at the time.

=== Saudi Arabia ===
In September 2016, the Senate voted 71 to 27 against the Chris Murphy–Rand Paul resolution to block the $1.15 billion arms deal with Saudi Arabia. The Saudi Arabian-led coalition in Yemen has been accused of war crimes. Following the vote, McConnell said: "I think it's important to the United States to maintain as good a relationship with Saudi Arabia as possible." In November 2018, McConnell stated that the killing of Saudi journalist Jamal Khashoggi "is completely abhorrent to everything the United States holds dear and stands for in the world", reasoning that this contrast warranted a response from the US. He later expressed opposition to a complete fracture in relations between the US and Saudi Arabia as not in the "best interest long term" and added that Saudi Arabia had been a "great" ally of the US as it related to Iran. On December 12, McConnell advocated for the Senate to reject a measure authored by Bernie Sanders and Mike Lee that would end American support for the Saudi-led military campaign in Yemen, calling the resolution "neither precise enough or prudent enough." McConnell endorsed a resolution by Foreign Relations Committee Chairman Bob Corker, which if enacted would charge crown prince of Saudi Arabia Mohammed bin Salman with Khashoggi's death, as doing "a good job capturing bipartisan concerns about the war in Yemen and the behavior of Saudi partners more broadly without triggering an extended debate over war powers while we hasten to finish all our other work."

Also in September 2016, both the Senate and the House of Representatives overrode President Obama's veto to pass the Justice Against Sponsors of Terrorism Act (JASTA), which targets Saudi Arabia, into law. Despite McConnell voting to override the President, McConnell would criticize JASTA within a day of the bill's passing, saying that it might have "unintended ramifications". McConnell appeared to blame the White House regarding this as he quoted that there was "failure to communicate early about the potential consequences" of JASTA, and said he told Obama that JASTA "was an example of an issue that we should have talked about much earlier". In vetoing the bill, Obama had provided three reasons for objecting to JASTA: that the courts would be less effective than "national security and foreign policy professionals" in responding to a foreign government supporting terrorism, that it would upset "longstanding international principles regarding sovereign immunity", and that it would complicate international relations.

=== Syria ===
McConnell was the only party leader in Congress to oppose the resolution that would authorize military strikes against Syria in September 2013, citing a lack of national security risk.

In January 2016, McConnell delivered a Senate floor speech endorsing the Senate voting to approve of a bill requiring additional FBI background checks and individual sign-offs from three high-ranking federal officials before refugees from either Syria or Iraq were admitted to the United States.

McConnell supported the 2017 Shayrat missile strike, saying it "was well-planned, well-executed, went right to the heart of the matter, which is using chemical weapons."

In April 2018, following the missile strikes against Syria carried out by the United States, France, and the United Kingdom, McConnell said he found it "an appropriate and measured response to the use of chemical weapons" when asked of the Trump administration's legal justification for the authorization of military action.

In January 2019, McConnell joined Marco Rubio, Jim Risch, and Cory Gardner in introducing legislation that would impose sanctions on the government of President of Syria Bashar al-Assad and bolster American cooperation with Israel and Jordan. McConnell stated that the legislation spoke "directly to some critical American interests in that part of the world" and affirmed "that the United States needs to walk the walk and authorize military assistance, cooperative missile defense as well as loan guarantees." McConnell introduced an amendment warning the Trump administration against "precipitous" withdrawals of American troops in Syria and Afghanistan, saying he chose to introduce it "so the Senate can speak clearly and directly about the importance of our nation's ongoing missions in Afghanistan and Syria."The amendment was approved 70-26 on February 4.

== Guns ==
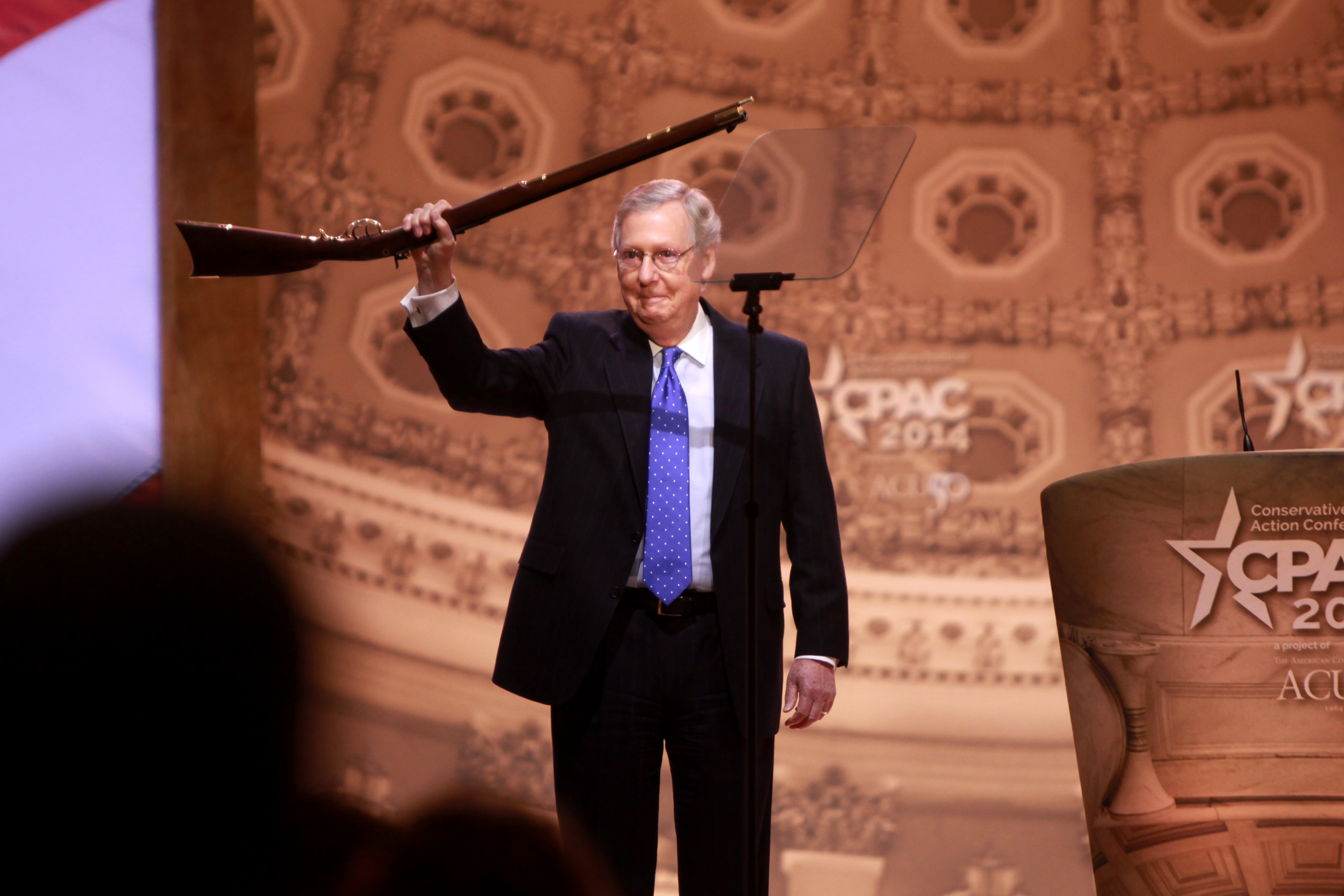
McConnell presenting a rifle at the 2014 Conservative Political Action Conference (CPAC) in National Harbor, Maryland

On the weekend of January 19–21, 2013, the McConnell for Senate campaign emailed and robo-called gun-rights supporters telling them that "President Obama and his team are doing everything in their power to restrict your constitutional right to keep and bear arms." McConnell also said, "I'm doing everything in my power to protect your 2nd Amendment rights." On April 17, 2013, McConnell voted against expanding background checks for gun purchases.

In January 2016, after President Obama announced new executive actions to combat gun violence, McConnell charged Obama with playing politics and panned the administration's record on prosecuting gun law violations as "abysmal". McConnell stated that examinations of the mass shootings "sort of underscores the argument that if somebody there had had a weapon fewer people would have died" and predicted Obama's proposals would fail to keep "guns out of the hands of criminals". In June, after the Orlando nightclub shooting occurred, then the deadliest mass shooting by a lone gunman in American history, four partisan gun measures came up for vote in the Senate and were all rejected. McConnell opined that Democrats were using the shooting as a political talking point while Republicans John Cornyn and Chuck Grassley were "pursuing real solutions that can help keep Americans safer from the threat of terrorism."

In October 2017, following the Las Vegas shooting, McConnell told reporters that the investigation into the incident "has not even been completed, and I think it's premature to be discussing legislative solutions if there are any." He stated that he believed it "particularly inappropriate to politicize an event like this" and the issue of tax reform should remain the priority while the investigation was ongoing.

On Tuesday, August 6, 2019, a group of clergymen appeared outside of McConnell's office urging the Republican Senate majority leader to take action after two mass shootings (in El Paso and Dayton) in 2019 within the past weeks. About two dozen religious leaders called the Coalition of Concerned Clergy prayed and voiced their stand on gun violence. Among those was Reverend Rob Schenck, a founding signer of an evangelical Christian pledge to take action on gun violence and Bishop Mariann Budde, the Episcopal bishop of Washington, D.C., a longtime advocate for gun violence prevention. Other protesters gathered outside of McConnell's Kentucky home chanting death threats and advocating violence against the Senator. One protester asked for bystanders to stab McConnell in the heart. When videos of the protesters were posted on McConnell's Twitter feed by his staff, his account was temporarily suspended for the use of violent imagery.

In June 2022, McConnell confirmed he would support bipartisan gun safety bill drafted by 10 Democratic and 10 Republican senators. He asserted that "the far left falsely claimed that Congress could only address the terrible issue of mass murders by trampling on law-abiding Americans’ constitutional rights" and assessed the bill as "a commonsense package of popular steps that will help make these horrifying incidents less likely while fully upholding the Second Amendment rights of law-abiding citizens."

== Health policy ==
McConnell led efforts against President Obama's health care reform, ensuring that no Republican senator supported Obama's 2009–2010 health care reform legislation. McConnell explained the reasoning behind withholding Republican support as, "It was absolutely critical that everybody be together because if the proponents of the bill were able to say it was bipartisan, it tended to convey to the public that this is O.K., they must have figured it out." McConnell voted against the Affordable Care Act (commonly called ObamaCare) in December 2009, and he voted against the Health Care and Education Reconciliation Act of 2010. In 2014, McConnell repeated his call for the full repeal of Obamacare and said that Kentucky should be allowed to keep the state's health insurance exchange website, Kynect, or set up a similar system. McConnell is part of the group of 13 senators drafting the Senate version of the AHCA behind closed doors. The Senator refused over 15 patient advocacy organization's requests to meet with his congressional staff to discuss the legislation. This included groups like the American Heart Association, March of Dimes, American Lung Association. and the American Diabetes Association.

In 2015, both houses of Congress passed a bill to repeal the Affordable Care Act. It was vetoed by President Obama in January 2016.

After President Trump took office in January 2017, Senate Republicans, under McConnell's leadership, began to work on a plan to repeal and replace the Affordable Care Act. They faced opposition from both Democrats and moderate Republicans, who claimed that the bill would leave too many people uninsured, and more conservative Republicans, who protested that the bill kept too many of the ACA's regulation and spending increases, and was thus not a full repeal. Numerous attempts at repeal failed. On June 27, after a meeting with President Trump at the White House, McConnell signaled improvements for the repeal and replacement: "We're not quite there. But I think we've got a really good chance of getting there. It'll just take us a little bit longer." During a Rotary Club lunch on July 6, McConnell said, "If my side is unable to agree on an adequate replacement, then some kind of action with regard to the private health insurance market must occur."

In October 2018, after the Trump administration joined Texas leaders and 19 other Republican state attorneys general in a lawsuit seeking to overturn the ACA, McConnell said it was no secret Republicans preferred to reboot their efforts in repealing the ACA and that he did not "fault the administration for trying to give us an opportunity to do this differently and to go in a different direction."

In February 2019, when Senator Sherrod Brown and Representative Lloyd Doggett unveiled legislation to allow Medicare to negotiate drug prices, Brown stated that he hoped for a vote in the House that would "put the pressure" on McConnell.

McConnell voted against confirming Robert F. Kennedy Jr. as Secretary of Health and Human Services in February 2025, citing Kennedy's anti-vaccine views.

=== Abortion ===
McConnell is anti-abortion and he supported the 2022 overturning of Roe v. Wade, calling Roe v. Wade a "terrible legal and moral error" and compared the overturning to when Brown v. Board overruled Plessy v. Ferguson. He called the decision "courageous and correct" and "an historic victory for the Constitution and for the most vulnerable in our society." McConnell has also voted for many anti-abortion bills throughout his senate career.

== Immigration ==
During his Senate tenure, McConnell has consistently voiced support for stronger border security. In 2006, he voted for building an improved fence along the Mexican border. Seven years later in 2013, he opposed bi-partisan immigration legislation because it did not include sufficient border security measures. While McConnell has stressed a need for increased vetting of foreigners traveling to the United States, he has also been critical of Trump's travel and immigration proposals that target Muslims. In 2015, he voiced opposition to then candidate Donald Trump's plan to bar Muslim immigration by saying proposals to bar visitors based on religion was "completely inconsistent" with American values. After Trump's election, McConnell warned the administration that they should not impose religious restrictions on those seeking entry to the United States, saying in an interview with ABC's Martha Raddatz, "I don't want to criticize them for improving vetting. I think we need to be careful; we don't have religious tests in this country." Subsequently, in June 2018, after the Supreme Court upheld the Trump administration's travel ban targeting seven countries, five of which were Muslim-majority, McConnell tweeted a picture of him shaking hands with Supreme Court Justice Neil Gorsuch whose vote was instrumental in upholding the administration's travel ban. Multiple news outlets considered the timing of the photo's release to be an endorsement of the Supreme Court's decision.

== Marijuana ==
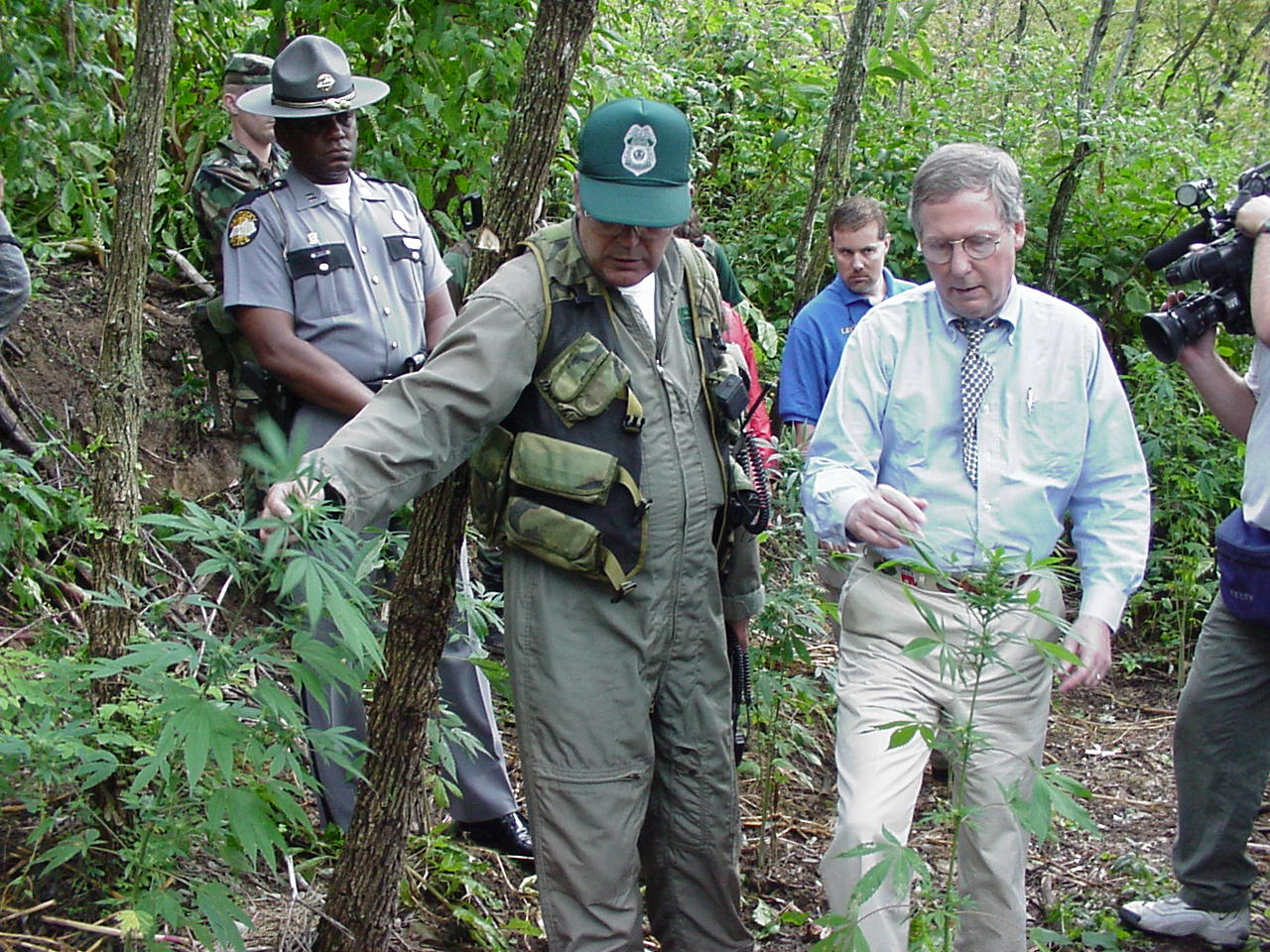
McConnell at an expedition to eliminate cannabis plants from the Daniel Boone National Forest in 1999

In 2018, McConnell stated he does not support the legalization of marijuana.

In 2022, McConnell was also responsible for the failure of the SAFE Banking Act by forcing the Act's removal from the defense bill. That same year, Senator Cory Booker alleged that McConnell used his authority as Republican majority leader to prevent voting on any marijuana-related bills in the senate.

== Net neutrality ==
In December 2010, after the Republicans gained control of the House in the 2010 midterm elections, McConnell delivered a Senate floor speech rebuking the intention of the Federal Communications Commission to instate net neutrality in its monthly commission meeting, saying the Obama administration was moving forward "with what could be a first step in controlling how Americans use the Internet by establishing federal regulations on its use" after having already nationalized healthcare, the auto industry, companies that could be insured, and loans for students and banks and called for the Internet to be left alone as it was "an invaluable resource." McConnell pledged that the incoming 112th United States Congress would push back against additional regulations.

In November 2014, after President Obama announced a series of proposals including regulations that he stated would keep the Internet open and free, McConnell released a statement saying the FCC would be wise to reject the proposal and charged Obama's plan with endorsing "more heavy-handed regulation that will stifle innovation."

In December 2017, after the FCC voted to repeal net neutrality, Senate Minority Leader Chuck Schumer announced his intent to force a vote on the FCC's decision, a spokesman for McConnell confirming that the Majority Leader opposed Schumer's plan and favored the FCC's decision to repeal.

In February 2018, the Internet Association sent a letter to McConnell and Schumer endorsing the retention of net neutrality as "necessitated by, among other factors, the lack of competition in the broadband service market" and calling "for a bipartisan effort to establish permanent net neutrality rules for consumers, startups, established internet businesses, and internet service providers."

== Statehood for Puerto Rico and Washington, D.C. ==
In June 2019, McConnell stated in an interview on The Ingraham Angle that he does not support statehood for Puerto Rico or the District of Columbia. He explained that Democrats in Congress "plan to make the District of Columbia a state – that'd give them two new Democratic senators – Puerto Rico a state, that would give them two more new Democratic senators". McConnell stated concern that this would lead to "full-bore socialism on the march in the House. And yeah, as long as I'm the majority leader of the Senate, none of that stuff is going anywhere".

== Tobacco ==
According to a NPR investigation of McConnell's relationship with the tobacco industry, "McConnell repeatedly cast doubt on the health consequences of smoking, repeated industry talking points word-for-word, attacked federal regulators at the industry's request and opposed bipartisan tobacco regulations going back decades." At the same time, the tobacco industry "provided McConnell with millions of dollars in speaking fees, personal gifts, campaign contributions, and charitable donations to the McConnell Center, which is home to his personal and professional archives."

Despite this however, In 2019, McConnell co-sponsored a bill to raise the minimum age to purchase tobacco products in the United States from 18 to 21. The bill became law in December 2019.

== Trade ==
In January 2018, McConnell was one of 36 Republican senators to sign a letter to President Trump requesting he preserve the North American Free Trade Agreement by modernizing it for the economy of the 21st century. In March, McConnell was asked at a news conference about the Trump administration's intent to impose tariffs on imported aluminum and steel, answering that there was "a lot of concern among Republican senators that this could sort of metastasize into a larger trade war" and that there were discussions between senators and the administration on "just how broad, how sweeping this might be, and there is a high level of concern about interfering with what appears to be an economy that is taking off." McConnell defended NAFTA as having been successful in his state of Kentucky. In July, during a press conference, McConnell said, "I'm concerned about getting into a trade war and it seems like ... we may actually be in the early stages of it. Nobody wins a trade war, and so it would be good if it ended soon." In October, after the United States, Canada, and Mexico concluded talks relating to rearranging NAFTA, McConnell said the subject would "be a next-year issue because the process we have to go through doesn't allow that to come up before the end of this year" along with confirming that the U.S. International Trade Commission would take priority the following year.

== Voting rights and election security ==
McConnell opposes restoring the voting rights of felons. In 2019, McConnell blocked Democrats from bringing a voting reform bill up for a vote in the Senate.

In 2019, he claimed that Democrats were at fault for election fraud in the 2018 North Carolina 9th congressional district election, and that voter ID laws would have prevented the fraud. There was substantial evidence that the operatives working for Republican candidate Mark Harris, not the Democratic candidate, engaged in an illegal ballot harvesting operation. Voter ID laws would not have prevented the ballot harvesting that took place; experts said that McConnell was conflating ballot fraud (where someone manipulates ballots of legitimate voters) with voter fraud (voting by illegitimate voters). The Associated Press and PolitiFact described McConnell's remarks as "misleading."

In 2019, McConnell blocked a range of bipartisan proposals to improve election security amid the threat of foreign election interference. The blocked bills included the Secure Elections Act, the Protecting the Right to Independent and Democratic Elections (PRIDE) Act, the Protecting American Votes and Elections (PAVE) Act, and the Honest Ads Act. He again blocked two election security bills the day after Special Counsel Robert Mueller testified in the House of Representatives that U.S. election security was threatened by foreign powers.

In response to McConnell's blocking election security bills, he has been sarcastically nicknamed "Moscow Mitch," with the hashtag #MoscowMitchMcTreason having trended on Twitter.

== President Trump ==
On October 17, 2024, according to a new book, The Price of Power published by New York Times journalist Michael Tackett, it was discovered that McConnell privately called Trump a "despicable human being", "stupid", and "ill-tempered" after his refusal to accept the results of the 2020 election. In response to this, McConnell stated: "Whatever I have said about President Trump pales in comparison to what JD Vance, Lindsey Graham, and others have said about him. . . but we are all on the same team now". He also stated that the, "MAGA movement is completely wrong,” and that Ronald Reagan, "wouldn’t recognize" the party today.
