= Intuit Dome =

Indoor arena in Inglewood, California, U.S.

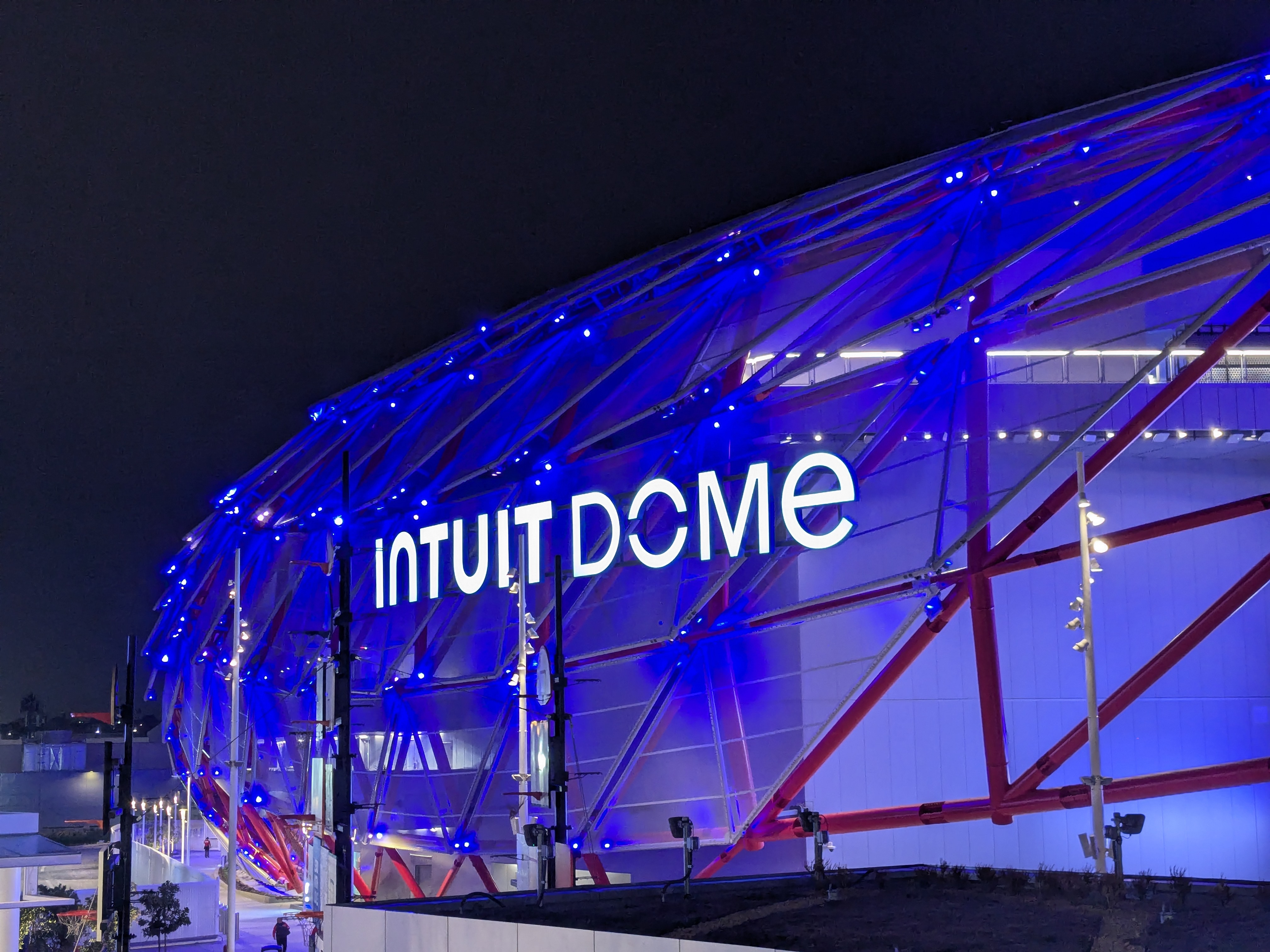
- Intuit Dome in October 2024

- Location in the Greater Los Angeles area Location in California Location in the United States Location in North America
- Interactive map of Intuit Dome
- Former names: Inglewood Basketball and Entertainment Center (planning phase)
- Address: 3930 West Century Boulevard
- Location: Inglewood, California, U.S.
- Coordinates: 33.9451°N 118.3431°W
- Owner: Steve Ballmer (Murphy's Bowl, LLC)
- Capacity: 18,300
- Field size: 915,000 sq ft (85,000 m^{2})
- Public transit: Downtown Inglewood; Metro Local 212 from Hawthorne/Lennox

Construction
- Groundbreaking: September 17, 2021; 5 years ago
- Opened: August 15, 2024; 2 years ago
- Cost: $2 billion
- Architect: AECOM
- Structural engineer: Walter P Moore
- General contractor: AECOM Hunt Turner NBA JV

Tenant
- Los Angeles Clippers (NBA) (2024–present)

Website
- intuitdome.com

Intuit Dome is a multi-purpose indoor arena in Inglewood, California, United States. The arena is located south of the other major Inglewood sports venues, SoFi Stadium and the Kia Forum. It is the home venue of the Los Angeles Clippers of the National Basketball Association (NBA). The Clippers previously played games at Crypto.com Arena, a venue the team shared with the Los Angeles Lakers of the NBA and the Los Angeles Kings of the National Hockey League (NHL), from the 1999–2000 season through the 2023–24 season.

The arena had a groundbreaking ceremony on September 17, 2021. It opened on August 15, 2024, ahead of the 2024–25 NBA season, and it is currently the newest arena in the NBA. The arena will host basketball during the 2028 Summer Olympics. The arena is also known for hosting the debut episode of WWE Monday Night Raw on Netflix.

== History ==
In 2017, the City of Inglewood approved an exclusive negotiating agreement with the Los Angeles Clippers to build a new, basketball-specific arena for the team, which would be located across from the then-under construction SoFi Stadium. The Clippers had not had their own arena since they left the Los Angeles Memorial Sports Arena in 1999 for Staples Center (now Crypto.com Arena), which they shared with the Los Angeles Lakers and the NHL's Los Angeles Kings.

Throughout the team's history, it never had any tangible ownership interest in any of its home arenas. The Clippers instead rented its previous venues in Buffalo's Memorial Auditorium (as the Braves), where it held low priority beneath the Sabres and Canisius College's basketball program, then San Diego's Sports Arena when they became the Clippers, followed by the Los Angeles Memorial Sports Arena.

Its previous deal with Crypto.com Arena (formerly Staples Center) allowed for a different Clipper court, and required a 'neutralization' process before and after each game to cover up and then restore Laker achievements, banners and sponsorships, along with setting its own court lighting pattern. In tightly scheduled weekends, which included Kings games and musical concerts in addition to the Lakers, the process was often completed within a three to four hour window, including cleanup of the seating bowl from the previous event. Clippers owner Steve Ballmer saw the construction of a dedicated arena for the team as being a high priority.

=== Lawsuits ===
Various lawsuits were filed to prevent the construction of the arena. Uplift Inglewood filed a lawsuit alleging that the agreement between the Clippers and Inglewood violated the state Surplus Land Act, which requires that proposals for affordable housing, recreation, and school projects be given preference when a city intends to sell its public land. Mayor James T. Butts Jr. argued that the proposed site had already been deemed unsuitable for residential use due to its proximity to Los Angeles International Airport.

The Madison Square Garden Company—owner of The Forum, a nearby arena in Inglewood that formerly served as the Lakers' home arena—were accused of using litigation to block the new arena, fearing that it would unduly compete with The Forum's live events business. MSG paid the legal fees of Inglewood Residents Against Takings and Evictions (IRATE), another group that filed lawsuits opposing the arena. In December 2018, the Clippers (via its subsidiary Murphy's Bowl, LLC) filed a countersuit against MSG over the matter.

In March 2019, leaked emails revealed that MSG's Irving Azoff attempted to lure the Los Angeles Lakers back to The Forum after their lease of Staples Center was up. Despite nothing coming of the proposal, Azoff's proposal to re-purpose The Forum was seen as a way of preventing the Los Angeles Clippers from building their own arena in Inglewood and ensuring that the Madison Square Garden Company got an unfair advantage over rival AEG, which is a Lakers minority owner. In November 2019, a judge ruled against Uplift Inglewood's lawsuit. In December 2019, the California Air Resources Board (CARB) approved the new arena, after evaluating the arena's environmental impact.

=== Construction and opening ===
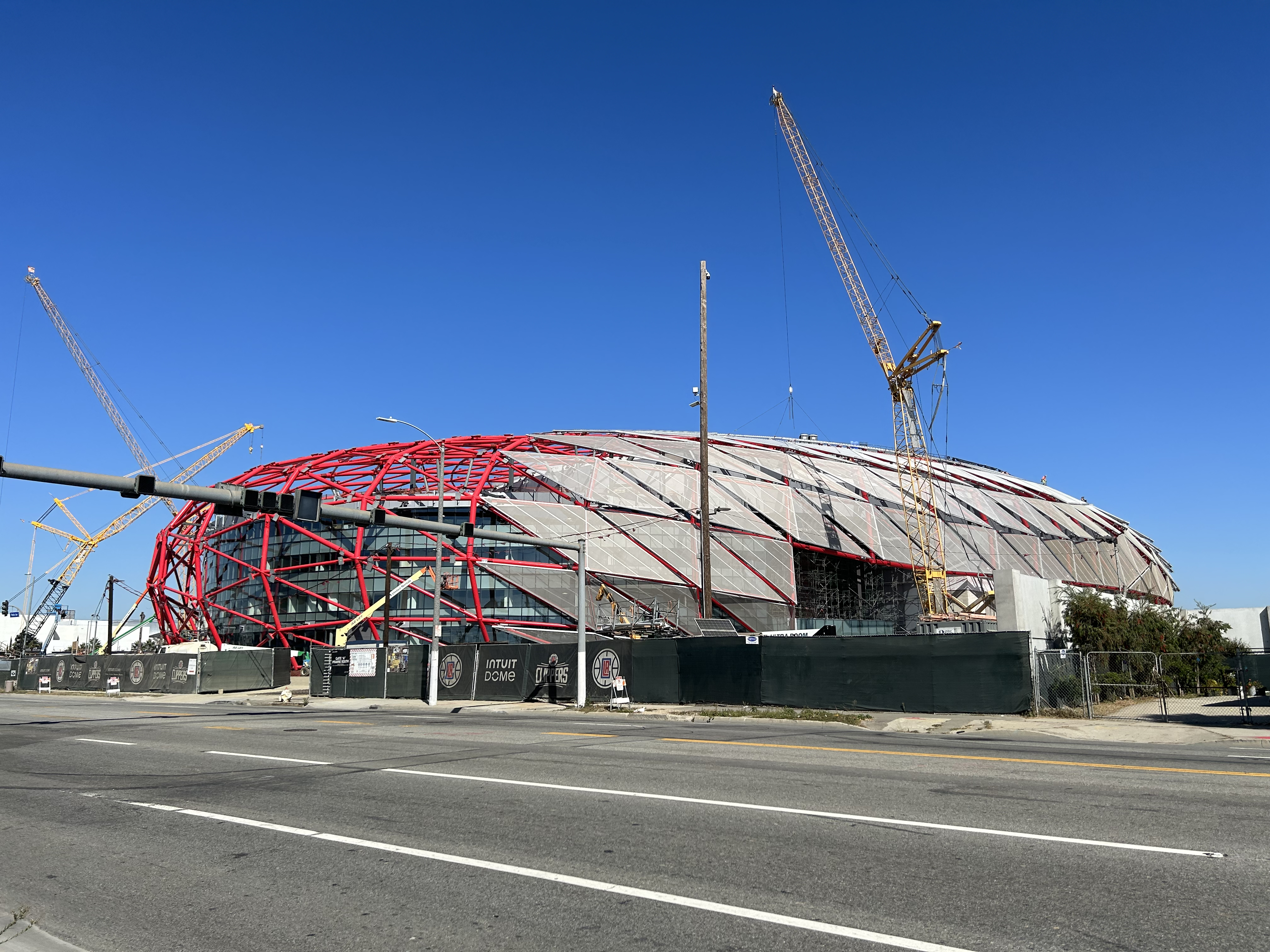
Intuit Dome under construction in October 2023.

In a move to settle the litigation, Ballmer announced in March 2020 that he would acquire The Forum from MSG for $400 million in an all-cash deal. The sale was completed in May, with all existing employees retained under the new ownership. The acquisition of The Forum was considered to be the last major hurdle blocking the construction of the new arena.

A groundbreaking ceremony was held on September 17, 2021. Ballmer described a goal for the new arena to be a "basketball palazzo". A 23-year naming rights deal for at least $500 million was announced with Mountain View, California based financial software company Intuit, naming the arena Intuit Dome. On April 5, 2024, it was announced that Bruno Mars would open Intuit Dome with back-to-back shows on August 15 and 16, 2024. The Clippers played their first preseason game at the arena on October 14, winning 110–96 against the Dallas Mavericks. They played their first regular season game at the arena on October 23, against the Phoenix Suns, losing 116–113 in overtime in front of 18,300 fans. The Clippers would get their first regular season win at the arena on November 4, 2024, when they defeated the San Antonio Spurs 113–104. The UCLA Bruins men's basketball team will occasionally play at the arena starting December 28, 2024 against the Gonzaga Bulldogs.

Intuit Dome hosted its first NBA playoff game on April 24, 2025, against the Denver Nuggets, a 117–83 win in front of 17,927 fans.

== Features ==
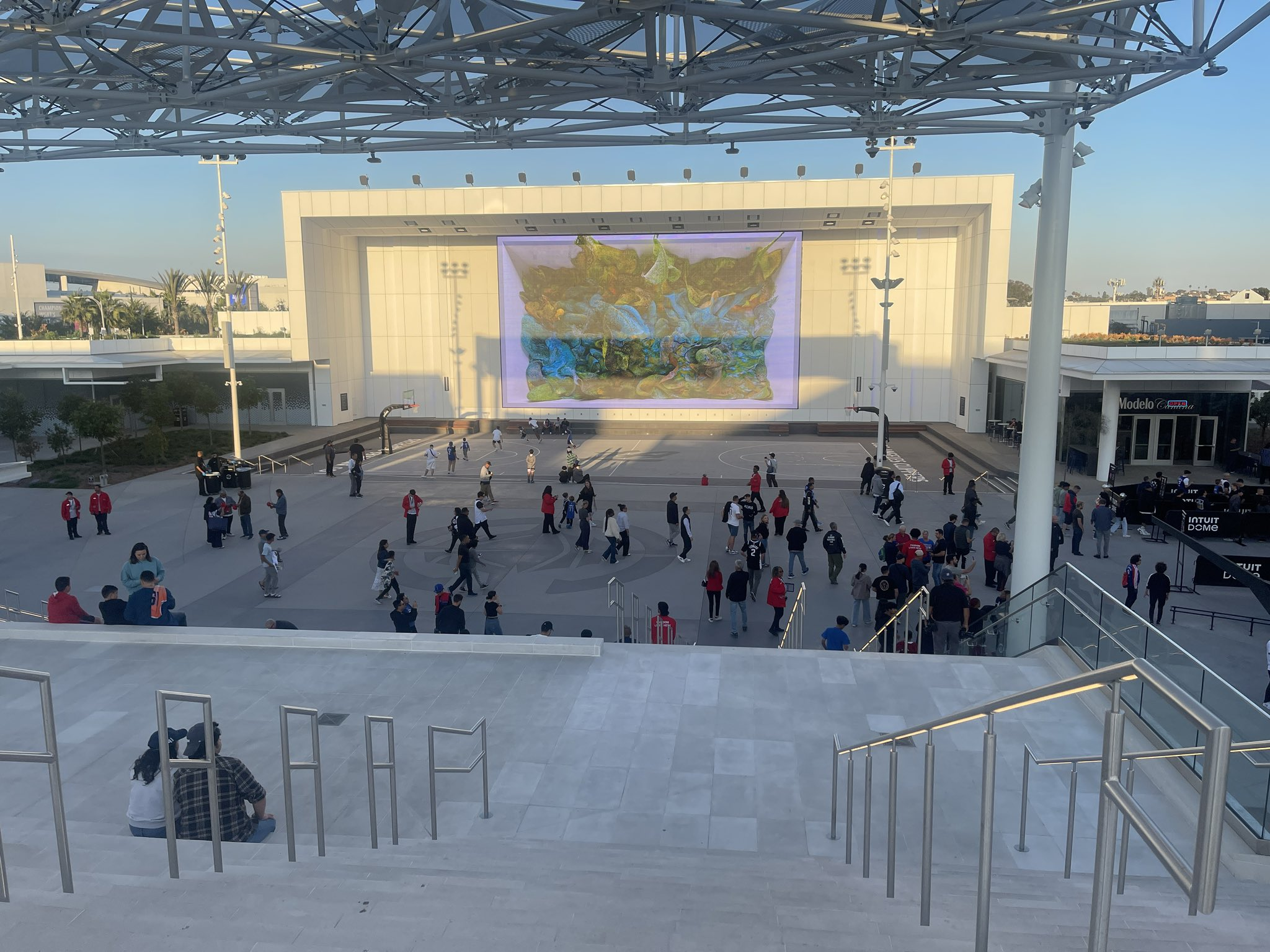
The Outdoor Court at Intuit Dome

On July 25, 2019, the Clippers released renderings of the proposed arena. The 18,000-seat arena was designed by AECOM. It includes a practice facility, sports medicine clinic, team offices, retail space, and a large outdoor plaza with basketball courts open to the public.

The practice facility is 85,000 square feet (7,900 m^{2}), the team offices 55,000 square feet (5,100 m^{2}) and the sports medicine clinic 25,000 square feet (2,300 m^{2}). An additional 40,000 square feet (3,700 m^{2}) are set aside for retail and 260,000 square feet (24,000 m^{2}) for the outdoor plaza.

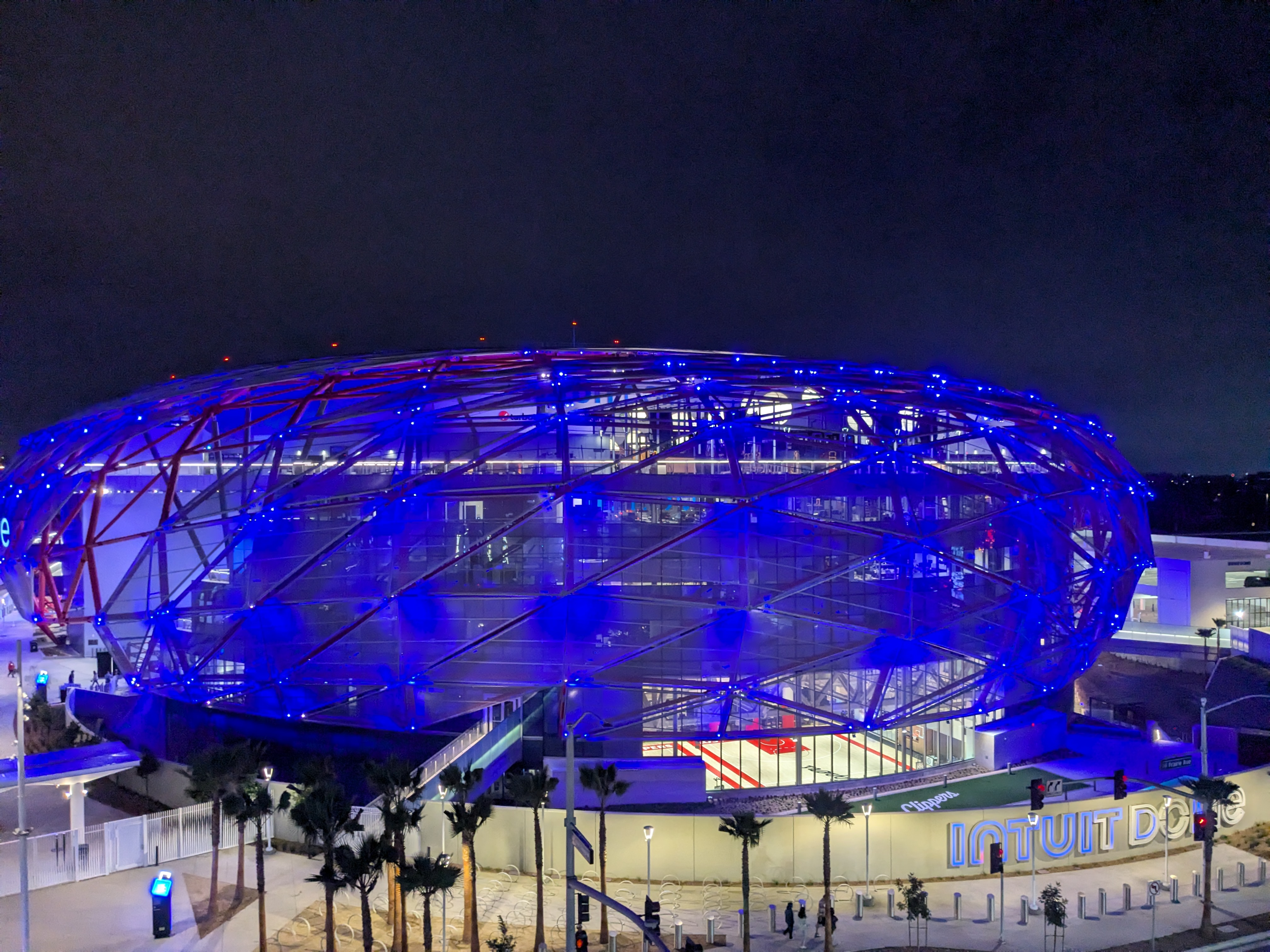
View of Intuit Dome's Eastern Exterior, with the Clippers' team office and practice facility visible

The Clippers have also launched a project where they display basketball jerseys from high schools across the state of California on the arena's rafters.

The arena features a seating section known as "The Wall", 51 consecutive rows with no suites positioned on the baseline adjacent to the visitor's bench exclusively reserved for Clippers fans. The section is similar to the "Yellow Wall" at Borussia Dortmund's Westfalenstadion in Dortmund, Germany.

The arena also has over 1,100 toilets and urinals, three times the league average to allow fans to return to their seats quicker instead of waiting in long lines.

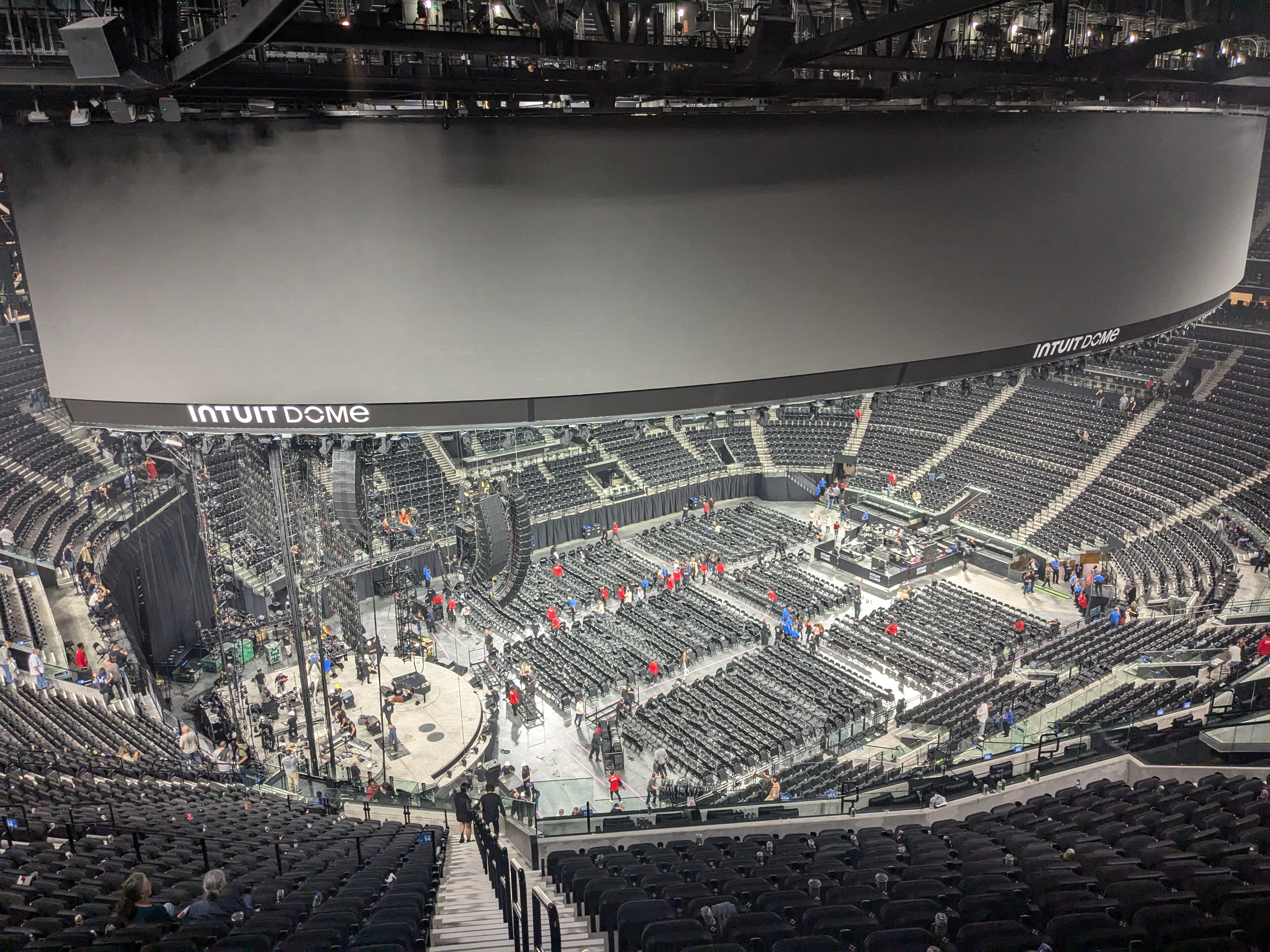
Video board of Intuit Dome, alongside a wide shot of the arena in concert layout

The arena features a double-sided halo board similar to the one at neighboring SoFi Stadium. The video board designed by Daktronics, covers 38,375 square feet (3,565.2 m^{2}) with a 4K resolution display. During an unveiling event on July 19, 2024, Steve Ballmer demonstrated some of the features that are displayed on the screen including "player 360" which shows detailed player profiles and a section called "coaches corner" that displays advanced stats about the game. The Halo Boards are also installed with T-shirt cannons capable of launching merchandise into the upper levels of the arena.

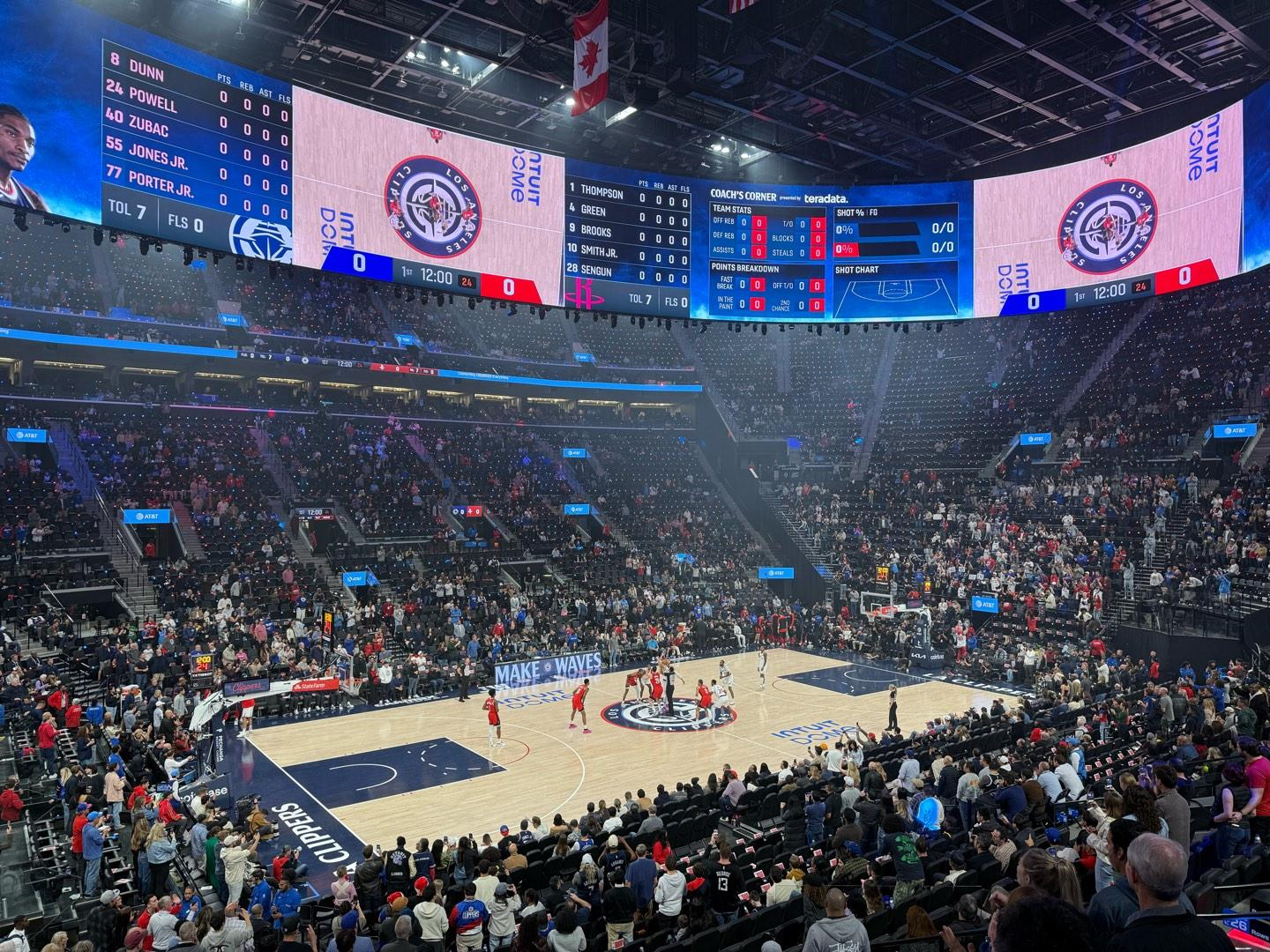
Intuit Dome during a game between the Los Angeles Clippers and Houston Rockets

The arena also has several pieces of public artwork:

- Glenn Kaino's "Sails", a series of clipper ships made of painted steel and wood with sails and masts made of backboards and hoops, which is located at the main entrance.
- Jennifer Steinkamp's digital artwork "Swoosh", a series of light animations which is displayed on the surface of the arena.
- Refik Anadol's digital artwork "Living Arena", featuring live data about flight information at LAX, the weather in Inglewood, player tracking from previous Clippers games, and the national parks of California, which is displayed on an LED screen near the community basketball court.
- Patrick Martinez's sculpture "Same Boat", a neon sign near "Living Arena" featuring Whitney Young's quote "We may have all come on different ships but we’re in the same boat now." which both honors the nautical origins of the Clippers name as well as the diverse background of the Clippers fanbase.
- Kyungmi Shin's stained glass mosaic "Spring to Life", which depicts silhouettes of basketball players on the Centinela Springs, the former water source of the Tongva people who are indigenous to the Los Angeles area.
- Michael Massenburg's mural "Cultural Playground", which depicts the diverse nature of Los Angeles's arts and sports scenes.

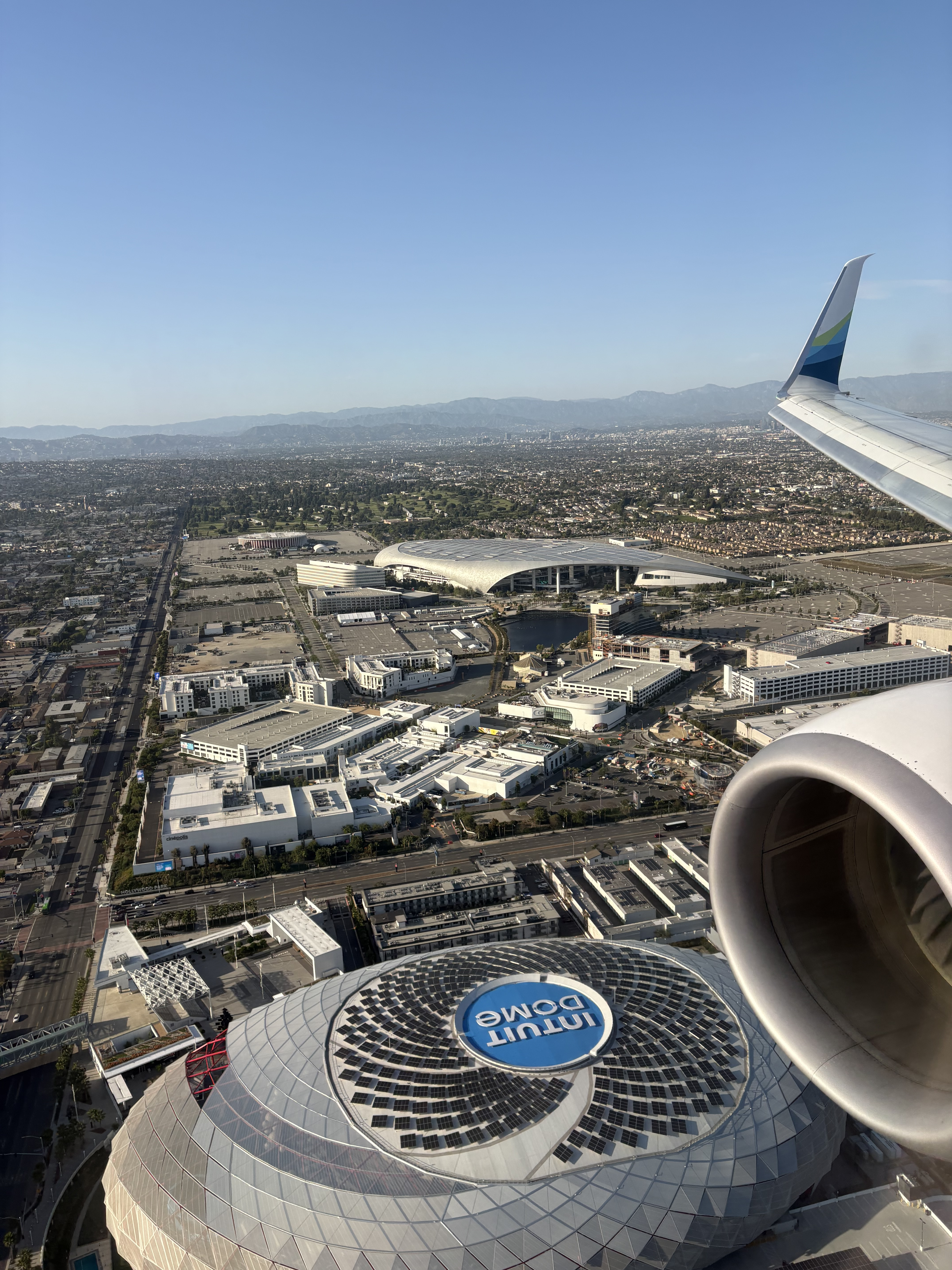
A view of Intuit dome from a plane flying into LAX

Two hotels are expected to open near the arena in June 2026; a five-story Fairfield by Marriott adjacent to Intuit Dome's east garage, and a fifteen-story Arya Hotel south of the arena on 102nd Street.

== Reviews ==
After the first regular season basketball game between the Clippers and Suns at Intuit Dome, Kevin Durant said, "Yeah, it was crazy. I was just staring at it the whole time. You're not used to that," referring to The Wall. Durant also mentioned that he had only experienced something similar once in college and that the noise "sounds a little different. It's going to be a tough road environment for anyone who comes in here." Devin Booker added, "You spend $2 billion, put a wall up."

== Events ==
=== 2026 NBA All-Star Game ===
The arena hosted the 2026 NBA All-Star Game on February 15, 2026.

=== 2028 Summer Olympics ===
The arena will host the basketball competition during the 2028 Summer Olympics.

=== Tennis ===
The arena will host the 2027 Laver Cup from September 24–26, 2027.

=== Concerts ===
Bruno Mars played the venue's inaugural shows on August 15 and 16, 2024 as part of his 2022–24 tour, followed by Marco Antonio Solís on August 18 for his Eternamente Agradecido tour, Olivia Rodrigo for her Guts World Tour on August 20 and 21, Contemporary Christian musicians Brandon Lake and Phil Wickham on August 22 as part of their Summer Worship Nights Tour, Peso Pluma on August 24 for his Éxodo Tour, Twenty One Pilots on August 27 and 28 as part of The Clancy World Tour, Future and Metro Boomin on August 31 for their We Trust You Tour, NCT Dream on September 12 for their The Dream Show 3: Dream( )scape, Slipknot on September 13 and 14 for their Here Comes the Pain Tour, and Grupo Frontera on September 20 for their Jugando a Que No Pasa Nada Tour.

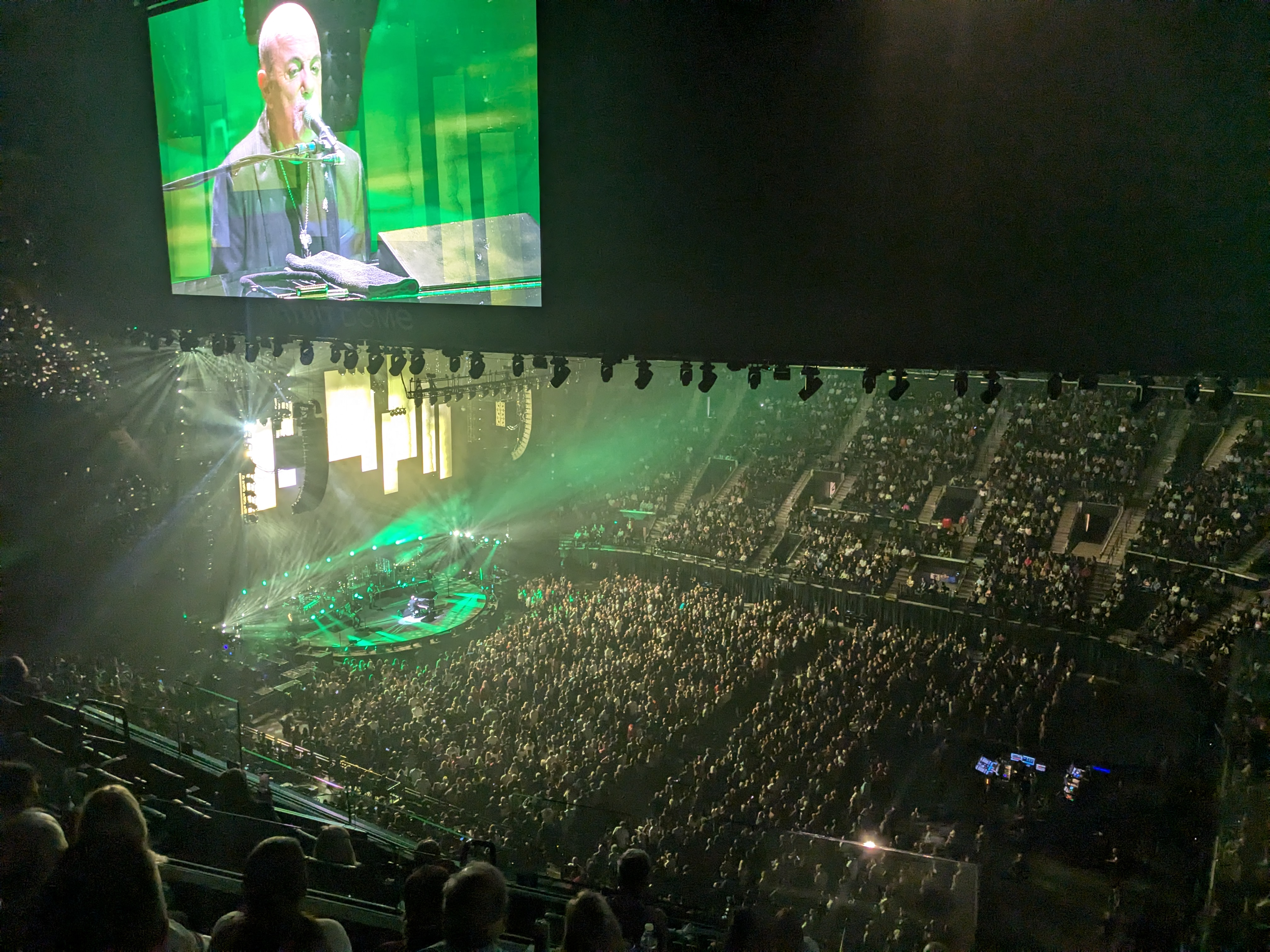
Billy Joel performing in Intuit Dome in October 2024

Usher's Past Present and Future tour performed at the arena from September 21–25. Elevation Worship performed on September 28. Weezer's Voyage to the Blue Planet tour performed at Intuit Dome on October 11, followed by Billy Joel the following night. Ana Gabriel performed on October 19 for her Un Deseo Más tour, followed by David Gilmour on October 25 for his Luck and Strange Tour, and Tyler, the Creator for the listening party of his eighth studio album Chromakopia on October 27. Fuerza Regida performed on November 15 and 16 for their Pero No Te Enamores Tour. Cyndi Lauper performed at Intuit Dome on November 23 during her Girls Just Wanna Have Fun Farewell Tour. Intuit Dome co-hosted FireAid on January 30, 2025, to help relief efforts for the wildfires affecting Southern California.

Rauw Alejandro became the first Latin artist to perform three back-to-back sold-out nights on April 25, 27, and 28, 2025. Alejandro was originally meant to perform from the 25th to the 27th, however the Saturday night show was rescheduled for the following Monday due to the Clippers making the playoffs.

On September 13, 2025, Linkin Park performed a sold-out show at the venue as part of the stadium tour promoting their comeback album From Zero. Footage from the show was used for a live video of their single "Up From The Bottom".

=== Stand-up comedy ===
Sebastian Maniscalco performed at Intuit Dome on August 17, 2024, as part of his It Ain't Right tour. Franco Escamilla performed on September 27, 2024.

=== Professional wrestling ===
Intuit Dome hosted the premiere episode of WWE Raw on Netflix on January 6, 2025, with American rapper Travis Scott also making an appearance.

On June 7, 2025, the arena hosted Money in the Bank.

=== Mixed martial arts ===
The UFC hosted their first event at the arena on January 18, 2025, for UFC 311: Makhachev vs. Moicano.

Most Valuable Promotions presented MVP MMA: Rousey vs. Carano at the venue on May 16, 2026, which aired live on Netflix.

== In the media ==
On October 13, 2024, 60 Minutes reported from the dome in a segment called "Ballmer’s Ballgame". Reporter Jon Wertheim received a tour of the facility by Steve Ballmer during the interview.

== See also ==
- List of indoor arenas by capacity
- List of indoor arenas in the United States
