= Cynic =

Cynic or Cynicism may refer to:

== Modes of thought ==
- Cynicism (philosophy), a school of ancient Greek philosophy
- Cynicism (contemporary), modern use of the word for distrust of others' motives

== Books ==
- The Cynic, an 1875 book by James Gordon Stuart Grant
- The Cynic: The Political Education of Mitch McConnell, a 2014 book by Alec MacGillis

== Music ==
- Cynic (band), a progressive rock/technical death metal band from Miami, Florida
- The Cynics, a rock band from Pittsburgh, Pennsylvania
- The Cynic (album), by Zoe Rahman, 2001
- The Cynic, a 2010 album by Monte Cazazza
- "The Cynic", a single by Kashmir featuring David Bowie, from their 2005 album No Balance Palace

== Other ==
- Cynic epistles, an assorted collection of Roman era letters concerning Cynic philosophy
- Cynical realism, a contemporary movement in Chinese art
- Cynics (film), a 1991 Soviet film
- The Vermont Cynic, a student newspaper of the University of Vermont
