= BlueDot =

Canadian AI software company

BlueDot Inc.
- Formerly: Bio.Diaspora
- Industry: Epidemiological AI software
- Founded: 2009
- Founder: Kamran Khan
- Headquarters: Toronto, Canada
- Products: BlueDot
- Website: bluedot.global

BlueDot Inc. (formerly Bio.Diaspora) is a Canadian artificial intelligence software company based in Toronto, Ontario. The company's flagship product is Insights, a software-as-a-service used to map the spread of infectious diseases.

== Background ==
=== Founding ===
The company was initially founded in 2008 under the project name Bio.Diaspora by Dr. Kamran Khan, a professor at the University of Toronto and infectious disease specialist at St. Michael's Hospital. Initial development took place in collaboration with the Centre for Research on Inner City Health, Ryerson University, the University of Manitoba and several commercial airport and air transport organizations.

According to Khan, the project's initial business concept was inspired by the detrimental effects of the 2002–2004 SARS outbreak on the City of Toronto. The company is said to have “attracted interest from public health, biodefense and industry groups worldwide, all of which are looking for real-time, global epidemic intelligence to protect their interests.”

Bio.Diaspora produced a report in 2009 titled “An Analysis of Canada’s Vulnerability to Emerging Infectious Disease Threats via the Global Airline Transportation Network” with funding from the Public Health Agency of Canada.

In June 2011, St. Michael's Hospital brought Bio.Diaspora to MaRS Innovation for market potential evaluation. By 2011, Bio.Diaspora had helped several countries anticipate and react to the spread of disease at mass gatherings such as the 2010 Winter Olympics in Vancouver, Canada and the 2012 Summer Olympics in London, the FIFA World Cup, and the annual Hajj pilgrimage in Saudi Arabia.

Bio.Diaspora partnered with the Centers for Disease Control and Prevention (CDC) and Harvard University to integrate the program with HealthMap, a technology that monitors public websites and global online media for news of emerging diseases.

=== Relaunch ===
Bio.Diaspora was relaunched as BlueDot in 2013. After Ebola spread across Africa in 2014, BlueDot predicted its migration out of West Africa and published its results in The Lancet. BlueDot then reportedly predicted a Zika virus outbreak in Florida six months before it occurred.

The company secured funding from Horizons Ventures in a Series A round in 2015. This was followed by an additional $9.4 million in 2019, with its primary investors being Horizon Ventures, The Co-operators, and BDC Capital's Women in Technology Venture Fund.

=== COVID-19 ===
BlueDot and its software received significant coverage during the COVID-19 pandemic, with several jurisdictions using BlueDot software to track outbreaks of COVID-19.

According to BlueDot, the company was the first in the world to detect the outbreak of SARS-CoV-2 in Wuhan, China. It sent an alert to its customers on December 31, 2019, and used data on airline tickets to accurately predict the virus' apparent travel to Bangkok, Seoul, Taipei, and Tokyo. This came six days before the World Health Organization sent out its own public warning. In January 2020, the BlueDot team published a rapid communication titled "Pneumonia of unknown aetiology in Wuhan, China: potential for international spread via commercial air travel" in the Journal of Travel Medicine.

On March 23, 2020, Canadian prime minister Justin Trudeau announced that it had contracted BlueDot through the Public Health Agency of Canada for COVID-19 modelling and monitoring.

In May 2022, outbreak intelligence analysts BlueDot prepared reports using anonymized data for the Public Health Agency of Canada (PHAC) to help it understand travel patterns during the pandemic. Canadian citizens' cell phone data accessed under direction from PHAC to view a detailed snapshot of people's behaviour, including visits to the grocery store, gatherings with family and friends, time spent at home and trips to other towns and provinces.
