= Heroic Hearts Project =

Nonprofit organisation

- Abbreviation: HHP
- Established: April 2017; 9 years ago
- Type: Nonprofit
- Purpose: psychedelic therapy
- Headquarters: New Smyrna Beach, Florida, United States
- Region served: United States
- President: Jesse Gould (Founder & CEO)
- Key people: Zach Riggle (Director of Operations), Jared Rinehart (Head of integration coaching), Dr. Grace Blest-Hopley (Director of research)
- Website: www.heroicheartsproject.org

Heroic Hearts Project is a registered 501(c)(3) nonprofit organization, functioning as a support group for US military veterans. The project engages psychedelic therapy to help people suffering a range of psychological maladies, such as PTSD, MST, severe depression, anxiety, etс. The organization has also been instrumental in the ongoing movement to change state and federal drug policies and overcome the stigma around them.

Heroic Hearts Project was founded in 2017 and is headquartered in New Smyrna Beach, Florida. Outside the Americas, the HHP is active in the UK and has a treatment center in the Netherlands.

== Overview ==
Heroic Hearts Project (also known as HHP) was established in 2017 by Jesse Gould, a former Army Ranger. Gould was diagnosed with PTSD and had traumatic brain injury from concussive blasts due to his time as a mortarman with the 75th Ranger Regiment. Gould claims that after completing a course of four indigenous ayahuasca ceremonies in Peru, his mental condition improved, and he decided to help other veterans by organizing and financing their trips for psychedelic treatments abroad.

== Activity ==
The project has already worked with many veterans, and there are hundreds of interested veterans with the PTSD on the waiting list. Applicants who wish to take part in the experience have to be prepped and vetted for months.

Initially, the project raised money to send veterans who have struggled with brain injuries, anxiety, depression, and PTSD to psychedelic retreats in Latin America, where legislation allows the psychedelic therapy. Now HHP helps connect hundreds of veterans with psychedelic-assisted treatments and provides resources for preparation and the after-care phase. It has raised millions of dollars to pay for retreat "scholarships" for military veterans, and sponsored Institutional Review Board approved research with the University of Georgia, the University of Colorado Boulder, and the University of Texas.

=== Legal initiatives ===
The project has been active in promoting legislative initiatives in various U.S. states that propose a change in statewide drug policy, increasing access to psychedelic therapies for veterans, as well as providing funding for research in the area. This includes several bills in New York State, a ballot initiative to make certain psychedelic fungi and plants among the lowest local law enforcement priorities in Washington, D.C., an act increasing access to mental health medication in Connecticut, and another ballot initiative to legalize psilocybin for therapeutic purposes in Oregon. There is also a legalizing psilocybin therapy bill in Pennsylvania.

Since treatment is not legal in the United States, and multi-week trips to Latin America are quite expensive, the HHP has come out in support of a California bill to legalize psychedelic therapy. The bill would permit to those aged 21 and older to possess small quantities of psilocyn, psilocybin, DMT, mescaline, LSD, ibogaine, and MDMA for personal use only. However, it wouldn't decriminalize the selling of such substances. The Senate Bill 519 was drafted by Democrat Senator Scott Weiner.

Since Governor Greg Abbott signed a bill that requires Texas to study the benefits and risks of ketamine, psilocybin, and MDMA for veterans treatment, the Dell Medical School at the University of Texas at Austin announced the start of the Center for Psychedelic Research and Therapy, where Heroic Hearts Project will be among the first program partners.

HHP supported the bill allowing terminally ill patients to have access to Schedule I drugs for which a Phase 1 clinical trial has been completed, that was introduced by Senators Rand Paul and Cory Booker.

== Criticism ==
According to Dr. Itai Danovitch, the chair of the Department of Psychiatry and Behavioral Neurosciences at Cedars-Sinai Medical Center, these drugs can have powerful therapeutic effects, however, be harmful, depending on how it is used. Consuming ayahuasca can be dangerous while taking antidepressants or some hypertension drugs. It can also set off psychotic episodes for people with such serious conditions as schizophrenia. Some retreats have strict protocols and rules that have been developed in consultation with medical professionals, but the ayahuasca boom sometimes has been exploited by charlatans and scammers.

Also, Dr. Matthew Johnson, a professor of psychiatry and behavioral sciences at Johns Hopkins University, worried that psychedelic retreats may be ill-equipped to screen people for whom trips can be dangerous.

== See also ==
- Post-traumatic stress disorder
- Psychedelic therapy
- Psilocybin decriminalization in the United States
- Federal drug policy of the United States
