= Jocelyne Bloch =

Swiss neuroscientist

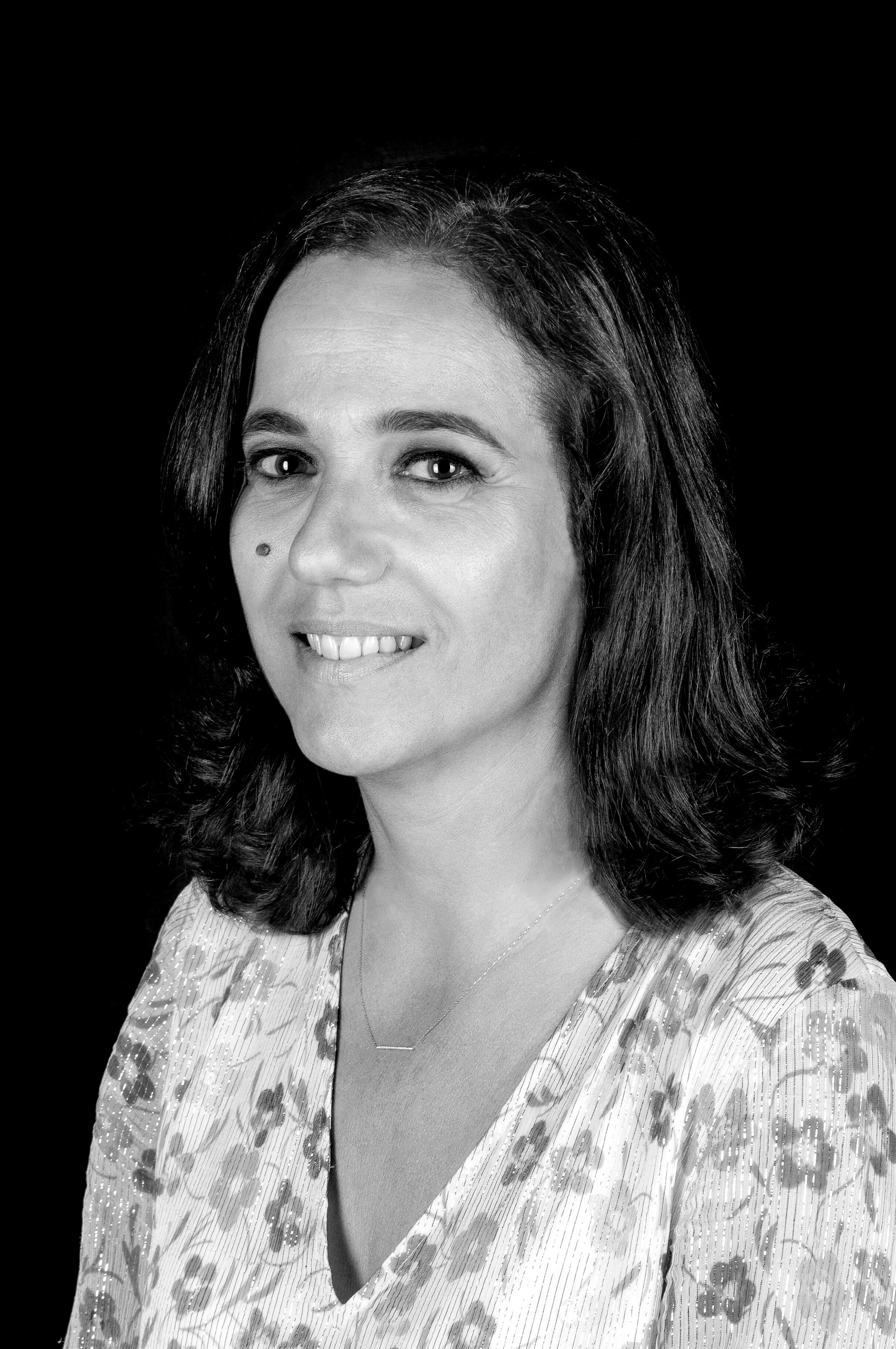
- Jocelyne Bloch in 2019
- Born: 1968 (age 57–58)
- Occupations: Neurosurgeon; Neuroscientist
- Known for: Neurorehabilitation

Academic background
- Education: Medicine
- Alma mater: Lausanne University
- Thesis: (1994)

Academic work
- Discipline: Medicine
- Sub-discipline: Neurosurgery
- Institutions: Lausanne University Hospital; EPFL (École Polytechnique Fédérale de Lausanne)
- Main interests: Neurosurgery; Deep brain stimulation Brain repair for movement disorders
- Website: https://www.neurorestore.swiss

Jocelyne Bloch (born 1968) is a Swiss neuroscientist and a neurosurgeon at Lausanne University Hospital and at EPFL (École Polytechnique Fédérale de Lausanne).

== Life ==
Bloch graduated in the Faculty of Medicine of Lausanne University in December 1994 and she obtained her neurosurgical degree in 2002. Her area of expertise is deep brain stimulation and brain repair in relation to movement disorders. In collaboration with EPFL, she is currently leading a clinical feasibility study that evaluates the therapeutic potential of this spinal cord stimulation technology, without a brain implant, to improve the walking ability in people with partial spinal cord injury affecting the lower limbs.

Since 2019 she has also been an adjunct professor of neuroscience at EPFL. Since 2019, Bloch together with Grégoire Courtine, leads the .Neurorestore Laboratory, jointly managed by the Lausanne University Hospital, the University of Lausanne, the Defitech Foundation and the EPFL.

Bloch was awarded the Ronald Tasker Award (2019) of the World Society for Stereotactic and Functional Neurosurgery for her innovative research in neuromodulation and spinal cord repair.

Jocelyne Bloch and Grégoire Courtine were named in Time 2024 100 influential people in health list.

In 2026, she received the Queen Elizabeth Prize for Engineering jointly with Grégoire Courtine.

== Paralysed but walking: Brain and spine implants help monkeys move again ==
The wireless brain and spine implants used could help paralysed people regain control of their bodies. Monkeys with spinal injuries that have left them paralysed are able to walk again through wireless implants in their brains and spines that bypass the damaged tissue. Scientists developed a brain-spinal interface to transmit neural signals from the brain to a site in the spinal cord downstream of the injury. Neurosurgeon Jocelyne Bloch of the Lausanne University Hospital, who surgically implanted the brain and spinal cord implants, says: "The link between the decoding of the brain and the stimulation of the spinal cord – to make this communication exist – is completely new".
