= The Cynic: The Political Education of Mitch McConnell =

2014 book by Alec MacGillis

- First edition
- Author: Alec MacGillis
- Language: English
- Subject: Mitch McConnell
- Genre: Non-fiction
- Publisher: Simon & Schuster
- Publication date: 2014

The Cynic: The Political Education of Mitch McConnell is a 2014 non-fiction book by Alec MacGillis about the political evolution of Mitch McConnell. The book documents his growing experience with political procedure and the change in his political direction to be more conservative.

Peter Hamby of The Washington Post wrote that the "overriding thesis" is that "the win-at-all-costs McConnell has come to embody everything wrong with a noxious American political system" due to his focus on remaining in office instead of dealing with issues faced by his constituents.

== Background ==
The author was a journalist for The Washington Post and a senior editor of The New Republic. Hamby described the author as "a thorough and well-trained reporter happily unburdened from the dispassionate constraints of he-said-she-said political journalism", one who is not "some liberal hack" despite having a writing style "with all the passion of a convert".

The author conducted 75 interviews.

== Content ==
The book has around 140 pages divided into three chapters. Hamby stated that due to the short length it includes "essentials", with the beginning being 1977, when McConnell successfully campaigned to the county executive position for Jefferson County, Kentucky. One chapter talks about his political campaigning style and the veracity of statements within. Portions also discuss how McConnell wishes for the campaign finance laws to be unchanged. Childhood and family details are not included.

Hamby stated "If it isn't obvious from the book's title, the author ... has a dim view of the senator."

== Reception ==
In his review Hamby stated that the book might have had a more positive tone had McConnell been a Democrat instead of a Republican.

== See also ==
- The Price of Power
