= The Price of Power (book) =

2024 biography of Mitch McConnell

- Author: Michael Tackett
- Publisher: Simon & Schuster
- ISBN: 978-1-66800-584-2
- OCLC: 1458762542

The Price of Power: How Mitch McConnell Mastered The Senate, Changed America, And Lost His Party is a 2024 biography of Mitch McConnell written by Michael Tackett.

The book is the fourth biography of McConnell.

== Reception ==
Reviewing the book for The New York Times, Jennifer Szalai argued that Thackett "tries mightily to make the most of his access" but appears to be "too much in thrall to the material".

== See also ==
- The Cynic: The Political Education of Mitch McConnell
- The Long Game: A Memoir
