= Grégoire Courtine =

French neuroscientist

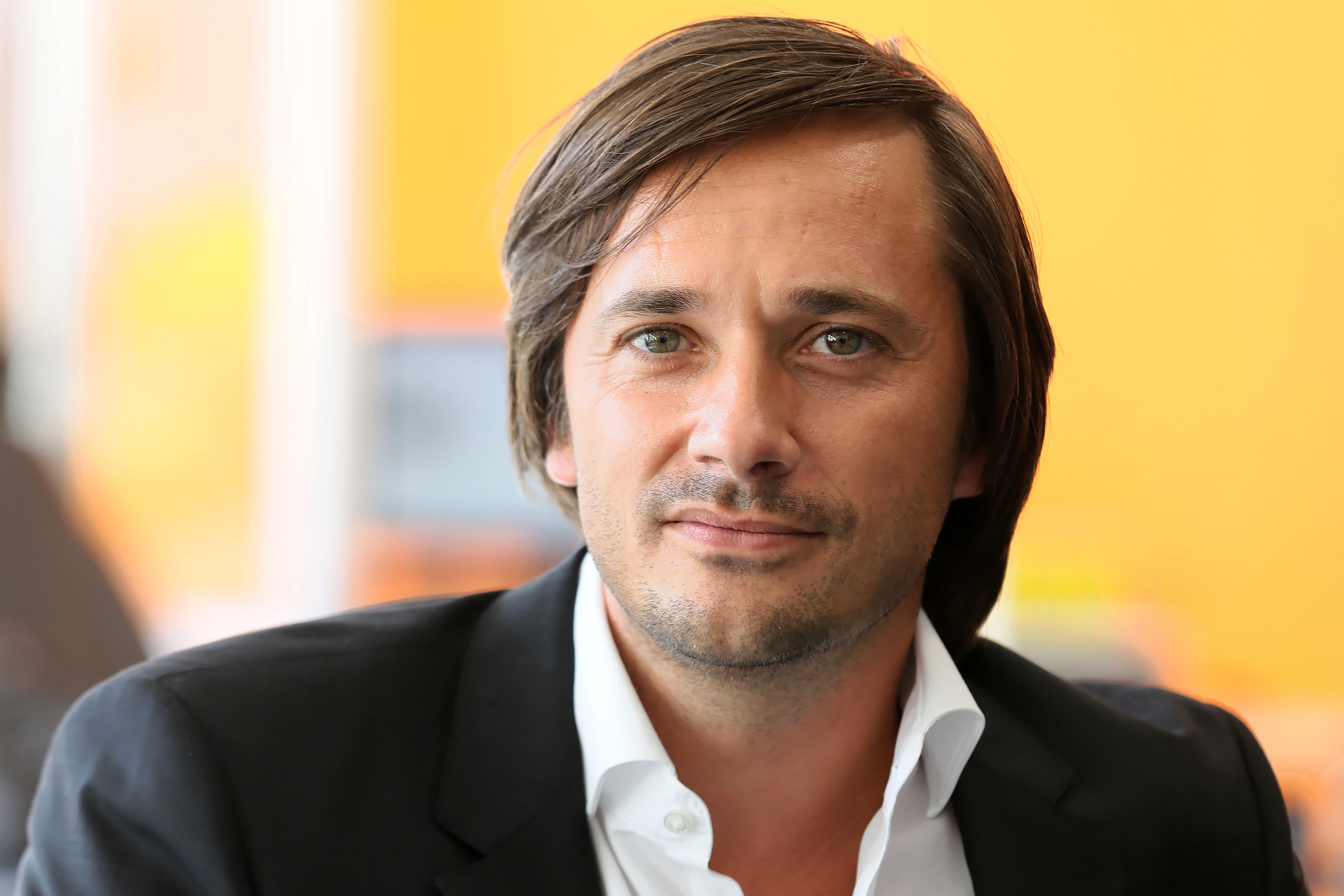
- Grégoire Courtine in 2014
- Born: 9 January 1975 (age 51); Dijon, France
- Known for: Restoration of locomotor functions in paralyzed animals

Academic background
- Education: University of Pavia; University of Burgundy; University of California (UCLA)

Academic work
- Institutions: École Polytechnique Fédérale de Lausanne (EPFL)
- Main interests: Neurorehabilitation
- Website: www.epfl.ch/labs/courtine-lab

Grégoire Courtine (born 9 January 1975) is a French neuroscientist and a professor at the École Polytechnique Fédérale de Lausanne (EPFL), where he is the co-director of the Defitech center for interventional neurotherapies (NeuroRestore). His research focuses on the field of neurotechnology, with the aim to restore locomotor functions in patients with central nervous system disorders such as spinal cord injuries.

== Career ==
After being trained in physics and mathematics, Courtine obtained a PhD in experimental medicine jointly from the University of Pavia and the INSERM at the University of Burgundy in 2003. He then performed post-doctoral work in the laboratory of Reggie Edgerton at UCLA from 2004 to 2007, where he studied the neural basis of spontaneous recovery after spinal cord injuries, and developed novel strategies to restore functional neural networks after spinal cord resection in rats. In 2008, he was appointed associate professor at the University of Zurich, where he established his own group with the aim to restore voluntary control of locomotion in paraplegic rats. He moved to EPFL in 2012 as an associate professor, and was promoted to full professor in 2019.

In 2014, Courtine co-founded the biotechnology venture ONWARD Medical with the aim to develop novel neurostimulation therapies; he currently serves as the company's Chief Science Officer.

Since 2019 Courtine, together with Jocelyne Bloch, leads the .NeuroRestore Laboratory, jointly initiated by the Defitech Foundation, the Lausanne University Hospital, the University of Lausanne and the EPFL.

== Research ==
Courtine heads the G-LAB within the Brain Mind Institute and the Center for Neuroprosthetics at EPFL. Research in the G-LAB aims at restoring motor functions after central nervous system disorders such as spinal cord injuries.

Using targeted spinal cord stimulation neurotechnologies, Courtine and colleagues significantly contributed to the field of neurorehabilitation by publishing a number of studies successively reporting the restoration of voluntary locomotion in rats with partial and complete spinal cord injuries, in primates and in paralyzed human patients, and restoration of blood pressure stability in human patients with spinal cord injuries through the use of biomimetic epidural electrical stimulation (neurostimulation of the spinal cord mimicking the natural activation of the autonomic or somatic nervous system).

== Distinctions ==
Courtine has received several international research and innovation prizes such as the Chancellor's Award for postdoctoral research (2008), the International Foundation for Research in Paraplegia Schellenberg Research prize (2010), the Debiopharm Group Life Science Award (2013), the Rolex Award (2019), and the Leenards Foundation Science Prize (2021).

He was also awarded a starting grant (2010), a consolidator grant (2015) and two proof-of-concept grants (2013 and 2019) from the European Research Council. In 2020, he was awarded the IET A F Harvey Prize. His name was included in Time 2024 list of influential people in health. In 2026, he received the Queen Elizabeth Prize for Engineering jointly with Jocelyne Bloch.
