= Michael Tackett =

American journalist

- Education: Indiana University Bloomington, The John Marshall Law School
- Occupation: Journalist
- Employer: The New York Times
- Awards: Edgar A. Poe Award for National Reporting

Michael Tackett is an American journalist who is currently the Deputy Washington Bureau Chief of the Associated Press. He previously covered national politics for The New York Times. He is a former recipient of the White House Correspondent's Association's Edgar A. Poe Award for National Reporting.

== Early life and education ==
Tackett is a native of Anderson, Indiana. He received a B.A. in Journalism and Political Science from Indiana University Bloomington in 1980. He then attained a Doctor of Law from The John Marshall Law School in 1985.

== Career ==
Tackett entered journalism as a reporter on the city desk of The Chicago Tribune, but had become National Editor at US News & World Report by 2001. He returned to The Tribune in 2005 to serve as the paper's Washington Bureau Chief.

Tackett was appointed Managing Editor of Bloomberg LP in August 2008, a month after he left The Tribune. He remained at Bloomberg until 2013, when he became a national political reporter for The New York Times based in Washington.

While at The Times in 2014, Tackett edited a series on state attorney general by reporter Eric Lipton that won the Pulitzer Prize for investigative reporting. He has also won awards himself, including the White House Correspondent's Association's Edgar A. Poe Award for National Reporting.

Tackett is also author of the nonfiction book The Baseball Whisperer, published by Houghton Mifflin in July 2016, as well as the 2024 biography of Mitch McConnell, The Price of Power.
