= 2025 All-Ireland Under-20 Hurling Championship =

Gaelic games championship

Championship Details
- Dates: 25 March - 31 May 2025
- Teams: 17

All Ireland Champions
- Winners: Tipperary (12th win)
- Captain: Sam O'Farrell
- Manager: Brendan Cummins

All Ireland Runners-up
- Runners-up: Kilkenny
- Captain: Tom McPhillips
- Manager: Mark Dowling

Provincial Champions
- Munster: Tipperary
- Leinster: Kilkenny
- Ulster: Antrim
- Connacht: Not Played

Championship Statistics
- Matches Played: 32
- Total Goals: 89
- Total Points: 1102
- Top Scorer: Fred Hegarty (2-45)

The 2025 All-Ireland Under-20 Hurling Championship was the seventh staging of the All-Ireland Under-20 Championship and the 62nd staging overall of a hurling championship for players between the minor and senior grades. The provincial group stage placings were confirmed in November and December 2024. The championship ran from 25 March to 31 May 2025.

Offaly entered the championship as the defending champions, however, they were beaten by Dublin in the Leinster quarter-finals.

The All-Ireland final was played on 31 May 2025 at UPMC Nowlan Park in Kilkenny, between Tipperary and Kilkenny, in what was their 10th meeting in the final overall and a first meeting in the final in 17 years. Tipperary won the match by 3–19 to 1–16 to claim their 12th championship title overall and a first title in six years.

Clare's Fred Hegarty was the championship's top scorer with 2-45.

== Leinster Under-20 Hurling Championship ==
=== Leinster Tier 1 Group Stage ===
==== Leinster Tier 1 Group 1 Table ====
Advance to Leinster semi-final Advance to Leinster quarter-final Advance to Leinster preliminary quarter-final

Team	Matches				Score			Pts
Team	Pld	W	D	L	For	Against	Diff	Pts
Galway	2	2	0	0	60	27	+33	4
Offaly	2	1	0	1	47	43	+4	2
Laois	2	0	0	2	22	59	-37	0

==== Leinster Tier 1 Group 1 Results ====
29 March 2025 Round 1	Laois	0-08 - 1-28	Galway	Laois Hire O'Moore Park
	J Quinlan 0-3 (one free), R Bannon 0-2, C Byrne 0-1, B Deegan 0-1 (free), E Cuddy 0-1 (free).	Report	R Burke 1-8 (1-0 penalty, 0-3 frees, 0-2 65), A Niland 0-3, C Lawless 0-3, R O’Donnell 0-2, J Rabbitte 0-2, B Callanan 0-2, C Killeen 0-2, C Gilligan 0-2, M Burke 0-1, D Campbell 0-1, C Burke 0-1, P Mac Cartaigh 0-1

8 April 2025 Round 2	Galway	4-17 - 0-19	Offaly	Duggan Park
	R O’Donnell 3-0, R Burke 0-9 (0-7f, 0-2 65s), J Rabbitte 1-2, A Niland 0-2, D Fahy 0-2f, P Mac Cárthaigh 0-1, D Campbell 0-1.	Report	D Ravenhill 0-12 (0-9f, 0-1 65), P Lyons 0-2, S Rigney 0-2, C Doyle 0-1, D Shirley 0-1, E Bailey-O’Brien 0-1.	Attendance: ~3,500

12 April 2025 Round 3	Offaly	1-25 - 0-14	Laois	Glenisk O'Connor Park
	A Screeney (0-5fs, 0-1 65) and P Lyons (0-1f) 0-7 each, S Rigney 0-5, C Egan 1-0, D Shirley, B Kavanagh, N Furlong, L Kavanagh, D Scully and E Bailey-O'Brien 0-1 each.	Report	J Quinlan 0-6 (0-5fs, 0-1 65), R Bannon and J Duggan 0-2 each, C Hill, C Byrne, J Breen and B Deegan 0-1 each.

==== Leinster Tier 1 Group 2 Table ====
Advance to Leinster semi-final Advance to Leinster quarter-final Advance to Leinster preliminary quarter-final

Team	Matches				Score			Pts
Team	Pld	W	D	L	For	Against	Diff	Pts
Kilkenny	2	2	0	0	45	31	+14	4
Wexford	2	1	0	1	29	34	-5	2
Dublin	2	0	0	2	40	49	-9	0

==== Leinster Tier 1 Group 2 Results ====
29 March 2025 Round 1	Wexford	1-06 - 1-13	Kilkenny	St Peter's College Grounds
	S Roche 1-2, D Purcell 0-1, J Nolan 0-1, D McCarthy 0-1, J Dunne 0-1.	Report	A McEvoy 0-6, S Bergin 1-0, E Lyng 0-2, R Glynn 0-1, E McDermott 0-1, M Brennan 0-1, C Hickey 0-1, R Corcoran 0-1.

5 April 2025 Round 2	Kilkenny	3-20 - 2-16	Dublin	UPMC Nowlan Park
	E McDermott (1-5); M Brennan (1-2); A McEvoy (0-5); J Hughes (1-0); E Lyng (0-3); R Glynn (0-2); J Neary, T McPhillips and M Murphy (0-1 each).	Report	D Purcell (1-5, 0-3 f, 0-1 65); D O'Kelly (1-2); S Crosbie, C Ó Riain, N Fitzgerald (0-2 each); J Sheppard, C Kennedy, D Mulqueen (0-1 each).

12 April 2025 Round 3	Dublin	0-18 - 1-17	Wexford	Parnell Park
	D O’Kelly 0-6 (5f); F Murphy, C Ó Riain 0-2 each; C Donovan, O Gaffney, B Kenny, S Crosbie, J Kinnane, N Fitzgerald, D Mulqueen, J Norris 0-1 apiece.	Report	S Roche 1-10 (1-0pen, 0-9f); J Nolan 0-2; P Doyle, C Doyle, C Byrne, R Donohoe, S Hyland 0-1 apiece.

=== Leinster Tier 2 Group Stage ===
==== Leinster Tier 2 Group 1 Table ====
Advance to Leinster preliminary quarter-finals

Team	Matches				Score			Pts
Team	Pld	W	D	L	For	Against	Diff	Pts
Kildare	2	2	0	0	47	33	+14	4
Kerry	2	1	0	1	49	44	+5	2
Carlow	2	0	0	2	31	50	-19	0

==== Leinster Tier 2 Group 1 Results ====
29 March 2025 Round 1	Carlow	2-12 - 2-23	Kerry	Netwatch Cullen Park
	S Kelly 1-3, B Nolan 0-6, J Dalton 1-0, J Kelly 0-1, C Quirke 0-1, TJ Darcy 0-1.		S McElligott 0-10, L Óg O'Connor 1-2, L Rochford 0-4, E O'Flaherty 1-0, C O'Sullivan 0-2, D Corridan 0-2, D Hogan 0-1, H Lenihan 0-1, J Enright 0-1.

5 April 2025 Round 2	Carlow	1-10 - 2-15	Kildare	Netwatch Cullen Park
	S Kelly 1-2 (1 free), J Kelly 0-1, C Kavanagh 0-2, C de Lacey 0-1, B Nolan 0-1 (free), C Quirke 0-1, TJ Darcy 0-1, J Ingram 0-1.	Report	T Power 1-0, A Bell 0-4 (4 frees), T Boran 0-2, C Carroll 0-4 (1 free), O Byrne 0-3, C O'Reilly 0-1, E O Briain 1-1.

12 April 2025 Round 3	Kildare	3-17 - 2-14	Kerry	Manguard Park
	E O Briain 2-1, T Power 0-6 (3 frees, 1'65), A Bell 1-0, C O'Reilly 0-2, C Carroll 0-2 (1f), O Byrne 0-2, A McNiff 0-1, T Boran 0-1, N Cramer 0-1, C Dunne 0-1.	Report	S McElligott 0-11 (7fs), L Og O Connor 2-1, L Rochford 0-1, D Hogan 0-1.

==== Leinster Tier 2 Group 2 Table ====
Advance to Leinster preliminary quarter-finals

Team	Matches				Score			Pts
Team	Pld	W	D	L	For	Against	Diff	Pts
Antrim	2	2	0	0	61	34	+27	4
Westmeath	2	1	0	1	40	44	-4	2
Meath	2	0	0	2	31	54	-23	0

==== Leinster Tier 2 Group 2 Results ====
29 March 2025 Round 1	Westmeath	1-15 - 2-23	Antrim	TEG Cusack Park
	D Corrigan 0-7 (frees), Cormac McKeogh 0-3, I Smyth 1-0, Callum McKeogh and C Ward 0-2 each, C Heffernan 0-1.	Report	F Bradley 1-9 (0-5f), J McCloskey 0-7, A McGarry 1-0, O Donnelly 0-2, C McKeown 0-2, J McLaughlin, T McLaughlin, N Magee 0-1 each.

5 April 2025 Round 2	Westmeath	2-16 - 1-12	Meath	The Downs
	D Corrigan 1-8 (0-5f), Cormac McKeogh 1-2, C Heffernan 0-4 (0-1f), C Ward 0-2	Report	K Ennis 0-8 (0-4f, 0-2‘65’), D Higgins 1-0, D Heffernan, G Douglas, J Christy, M Leavy 0-1 each

15 April 2025 Round 3	Meath	2-10 - 3-23	Antrim	Páirc Naomh Bríd
	D O’Higgins 2-0, K Ennis 0-4 (0-3f), M Leavy (0-2f)G Douglas (0-1 sl) 0-2 each, C Slattery, L Gallagher 0-1 each	Report	F Bradley 1-8 (0-4f, 0-1 '65), J McCloskey 1-4, J McLaughlin 1-2, O Donnelly 0-2, S McKay, B McGarry, L Glackin, A McGarry, R Fitzgerald, L McFerron, O O'Connor 0-1 each

=== Leinster Knockout Stage ===
Preliminary Quarter-Finals
Antrim	4-10
Dublin	2-19
Kildare	2-16
Laois	1-29

Quarter-Finals
Dublin	4-12
Offaly	0-16
Wexford	1-18
Laois	1-24

Semi-Finals
Galway	0-17
Dublin	2-18
Kilkenny	0-26
Laois	1-09

Under-20 Leinster Final
Dublin	0-17
Kilkenny	2-21

==== Leinster Preliminary Quarter-Finals ====
23 April 2025 Preliminary quarter-final	Kildare	2-16 - 1-29	Laois	Cedral St Conleth's Park
	T Power 0-8 (0-5 frees), A Bell 2-1 (2-0 frees), C O'Reilly 0-2, O Byrne 0-2, T Frisby 0-1, T Boran 0-1, CJ Boran 0-1.	Report	R Bannon 0-7, J Quinlan 0-7 (0-4 frees), J Breen 0-5, C Byrne 1-2, B Deegan 0-3 (0-1 sideline), E Cuddy 0-2, C Hill 0-1, T Cuddy 0-1, J Duggan 0-1.

23 April 2025 Preliminary quarter-final	Antrim	4-10 - 2-19	Dublin	Páirc Naomh Bríd
	F Bradley 1-6 (0-4f, 0-1 sideline); J McCloskey 2-1 (1-0f); C McKeown 1-1; J McLaughlin, C McAuley 0-1 apiece.	Report	D O’Kelly 2-5 (0-3f); B Kenny 0-4; O Gaffney 0-2; C Graham, F Murphy, C Kennedy, N Fitzgerald, K Costello, J Kinnane, J Sheppard, B Lynch 0-1 apiece.

==== Leinster Quarter-Finals ====
5 May 2025 Quarter-final	Dublin	4-12 - 0-16	Offaly	Cedral St Conleth's Park
	O Gaffney 2-2; C Graham 2-0; D O’Kelly 0-3 (1f); B Kenny, S Crosbie 0-2 each; C Kennedy, C Ó Riain, J Norris 0-1 apiece.	Report	A Screeney 0-8 (7f, 1 ’65); D Ravenhill 0-4 (1f); S Rigney 0-3; L Kavanagh, D Shirley 0-1 apiece.

5 May 2025 Quarter-final	Wexford	1-18 - 1-24	Laois	Chadwicks Wexford Park
	S Roche 0-10 (0-7 frees, 0-1 65’), C Fanning 1-0, J Nolan 0-2, P Doyle, D McCarthy, P Jones, R Donohoe, C Doyle and E Hughes 0-1 each	Report	B Deegan 0-10 (0-9 frees), J Duggan 1-3, J Breen, R Kavanagh, R Kelly and R Deegan 0-2 each, C Byrne, J Pearson and J Quinlan 0-1 each.

==== Leinster Semi-Finals ====
14 May 2025 Semi-final	Laois	1-09 - 0-26	Kilkenny	Laois Hire O'Moore Park
	B Deegan 0-4 (4 frees); K Cuddy 1-0; T Cuddy, R Deegan, J Quinlan, J Breen, C Hill 0-1 each.	Report	M Brennan 0-8 (4 frees); M Murphy 0-5; A McEvoy (2 frees), A Ireland Wall, E McDermott, E Lyng, S Bergin 0-2 each; E Lauhoff, R Glynn, G Kelly 0-1 each.

14 May 2025 Semi-final	Galway	0-17 - 2-18	Dublin	Glenisk O'Connor Park
	R Burke 0-7 (0-4f), P Mac Cárthaigh 0-2, B Callanan 0-2, J Rabbitte 0-2, C Killeen 0-2, C Lawless 0-1, A Niland 0-1f.	Report	C Graham 2-3, D O’Kelly 0-5f, O Gaffney 0-5 (0-2f, 0-1 pen), S Crosbie 0-3, C Ó Riain 0-1, B Kenny 0-1.

==== Leinster Final ====
21 May 2025 Final	Kilkenny	2-21 - 0-17	Dublin	Laois Hire O'Moore Park
	M Brennan 0-8 (5 frees, 1 65); R Glynn 1-2; A McEvoy 1-1; E Lauhoff 0-4; D Vereker, T McPhillips 0-2 each; E McDermott, A Ireland Wall 0-1 each.	Report	S Crosbie (1 free), D O'Kelly (4 frees) 0-4 each; O Gaffney 0-3 (3 frees); C O Riain, C Graham 0-2 each; J Kinnane, B Kenny 0-1 each.

== Munster Under-20 Hurling Championship ==
=== Munster Group Stage ===
==== Munster Group Stage Table ====
Advance to Munster final Advance to Munster semi-final

Team	Matches				Score			Pts
Team	Pld	W	D	L	For	Against	Diff	Pts
Tipperary	4	3	0	1	97	77	20	6
Cork	4	2	1	1	91	83	8	5
Clare	4	2	1	1	91	89	2	5
Limerick	4	1	1	2	81	85	-4	3
Waterford	4	0	1	3	71	97	-26	1

==== Munster Group Stage Results ====
25 March 2025 Round 1	Tipperary	0-17 - 2-13	Limerick	FBD Semple Stadium
	D McCarthy 0-11 (6fs, 1 65), C Martin, A Daly 0-2 each, C English, P McCormack 0-1 each.	Report	H Flanagan 0-6 (6fs), M Fitzgerald, M O’Brien 1-0; T Boddy, R O’Farrell, F Fitzgerald 0-2 each; D Scully 0-1.	Attendance: 2,768; Referee: C O'Regan (Cork)

26 March 2025 Round 1	Clare	1-16 - 1-16	Cork	O'Garney Park
	F Hegarty 0-5 f, S Boyce 1-2, D Stritch 0-4, R Kilroy, J O’Neill, E McMahon, J Hegarty (0-1 f), J Organ (0-1 f) 0-1 each.	Report	Barry Walsh 0-12 (0-10 f, 0-1 65), J Wigginton Barrett 1-3, M O’Brien 0-1.	Attendance: 2,358; Referee: A Tierney (Tipperary)

2 April 2025 Round 2	Cork	2-11 - 1-20	Tipperary	SuperValu Páirc Uí Chaoimh
	B Walsh (0-6, 0-5 frees), B O’Flynn (1-1), M O’Brien (1-0), D McCarthy (free), T Wilk, D Murnane and R Deasy (0-1 each).	Report	D McCarthy (0-7 frees), P McCormack (1-0), O O’Donoghue (0-3), S O’Farrell, C Martin, C English and J Ormond (0-2 each), J Egan and A Daly (0-1 each).	Referee: N O'Toole (Waterford)

2 April 2025 Round 2	Waterford	0-17 - 2-18	Clare	Cappoquin Logistics Fraher Field
	M Hartley 0-9 (7fs), J Twomey 0-3, C Tobin 0-2, P Cummins, A O'Neill, G Power 0-1 each.	Report	F Hegarty 1-7 (7fs, 1-0 pen), J Organ 1-0, M Collins, J O'Neill 0-3 each, L Crotty, J Moylan, R Kilroy, E McMahon, S Boyce 0-1 each.	Referee: C Doyle (Tipperary)

9 April 2025 Round 3	Waterford	1-13 - 0-16	Limerick	Cappoquin Logistics Fraher Field
	M Hartley 0-6 (5fs, 1 65), J Twomey 0-4 (1 sideline), M Morrissey, P Walsh, C Ryan, C Tobin, J McDonnell, B O'Sullivan 0-1 each.	Report	M O'Brien 1-3 (1-2fs, 1 65), R O'Farrell, H Flanagan (3fs) 0-3 each, S Duff, D Ferland, D Coughlan, R O'Connor 0-1 each.	Referee: J Bugler (Clare)

16 April 2025 Round 3	Clare	0-21 - 3-21	Tipperary	O'Garney Park
	F Hegarty 0-7 (0-6f), J O’Neill 0-3, D Stritch, R Kilroy, J Moylan 0-2 each, M Collins, S Boyce, J Mescall, J Hegarty, R Loftus 0-1 each	Report	D McCarthy 0-9 (0-7f, 0-1 '65), C Martin 2-1, P McCormack 1-2, S O’Farrell 0-3, A Daly, O O’Donoghue 0-2 each, J Hayes, D Costigan 0-1 each	Referee: E Stapleton (Limerick)

23 April 2025 Round 4	Limerick	1-20 - 1-22	Cork	Gaelic Grounds
	M O’Brien 0-5 (0-4 f), R O’Farrell, F Fitzgerald 0-3 each, D Coughlan 1-0, D Ferland 0-2, J Cosgrove, D Langan, M Fitzgerald, J Finn, H Flanagan, S Duff, D Frewen 0-1 each.	Report	Barry Walsh 0-12 (0-10 f), T Wilk 1-2 (0-1 sideline), B O’Flynn 0-2, P O’Shea, R O’Sullivan, M O’Brien, F O’Brien, A O’Sullivan, D O’Connell (0-1 f) 0-1 each.

23 April 2025 Round 4	Tipperary	1-24 - 2-14	Waterford	FBD Semple Stadium
	P McCormack (1-4); O O’Donoghue (0-7, 4 frees); A Daly (0-5); C English, S Butler, J Ormond (0-2 each); J Ryan (free), J Egan (0-1 each).	Report	B O’Sullivan (2-2); M Hartley (2 frees), T Carey (3 frees) (0-3 each); M Morrissey, J Twomey (1s/l) (0-2 each); C Tobin, G Power (0-1 each).

30 April 2025 Round 5	Limerick	1-20 - 0-27	Clare	TUS Gaelic Grounds
	M O'Brien (0-10, 0-8 frees, 0-1 65), R O'Farrell 1-1, D Ferland, R O'Connor and H Flanagan 0-2 each, F Fitzgerald, M Fitzgerald and D Hurley 0-1 each	Report	F Hegarty (0-7, 0-7 frees), J O'Neill 0-6, J Organ and S Boyce 0-3 each, D Stritch and M Collins 0-2 each, J Hegarty (0-2, 0-1 free and 0-1 65), E McMahon and R Kilroy, 0-1 each.

30 April 2025 Round 5	Cork	3-21 - 0-18	Waterford	SuperValu Páirc Uí Chaoimh
	Barry Walsh 2-4 (1-0 pen, 4f), Johnnie Murphy 1-0, F O’Brien, A O’Sullivan 0-3 each, R O’Sullivan, R Deasy, B O’Flynn, 0-2 each, Ben Walsh (sl), John Murphy, D O’Connell (f), J Wiggington Barrett, O Fitzgerald 0-1 each.	Report	T Carey 0-9 (9), J Twomey 0-3, M Hartley 0-2, E Spellman, B O’Sullivan, M Morrissey, P Cummins 0-1 each.

=== Munster Knockout Stage ===
==== Munster Semi-Final ====
7 May 2025 Semi-final	Cork	0-20 - 2-15	Clare	SuperValu Páirc Uí Chaoimh
	Barry Walsh 0-9 (0-6 f, 0-3 65), B O’Flynn, A O’Sullivan 0-3 each, F O’Brien, John Murphy, O Fitzgerald, Ben Walsh, D O’Connell (0-1 f).	Report	F Hegarty 0-7 f, D Stritch, S Boyce 1-1 each, J O’Neill 0-3, D Costelloe, R Kilroy, H Doherty (0-1 f) 0-1 each.

==== Munster Final ====
14 May 2025 Final	Tipperary	3-19 - 1-20	Clare	TUS Gaelic Grounds
	D McCarthy (1-8, 1-0 pen, 0-8 frees); O O’Donoghue (1-3); C English (1-2); C Martin (0-3), P McCormack (0-2); J Egan (0-1).	Report	F Hegarty (1-12, 1-0 pen, 0-9 frees); J Organ, J O’Neill (0-2 each); D Costelloe, R Kilroy, S Boyce, M Collins (0-1 each).	Attendance: 6,476; Referee: C O'Regan (Cork)

== All-Ireland Under-20 Hurling Championship ==
=== All-Ireland final ===
31 May 2025 Final	Kilkenny	1-16 - 3-19	Tipperary	UPMC Nowlan Park
	M Brennan 0-11 (8fs), M Murphy 1-2, J Neary, E McDermott, G Kelly 0-1 each.	Report	P McCormack 2-1, C Martin 1-4, D McCarthy 0-5 (5fs), O O’Donoghue 0-3 (1s/l), S O’Farrell, A Daly, C English 0-2 each.	Attendance: 14,455; Referee: S Hynes (Galway)

== All-Ireland Under-20 'B' Hurling Championship ==
As in the All-Ireland Senior Hurling Championship, there are tiers of competition below the main championship for lower ranked Under-20 teams, the first of which is the 'B' Championship for the second tier teams.

=== Knockout Stage ===
Quarter finals
30 March, Ballina
Mayo	3-14
Tyrone	3-24
29 March, Dr Hyde Park
Roscommon	2-24
Wicklow	5-16
29 March, Owenbeg
Derry	3-22
Sligo	0-07
30 March, Convoy
Donegal	1-11
Down	1-18

Semi finals
5 April, Darver
Tyrone	4-09
Wicklow	2-10
5 April, Owenbeg
Derry	2-16
Down	4-15

All-Ireland U20 'B' Hurling Final
3 May, Breffni Park
Tyrone	4-11
Down	1-22

==== Quarter-Finals ====
29 March 2025 Quarter-Final	Roscommon	2-24 - 5-16	Wicklow	Dr Hyde Park

29 March 2025 Quarter-Final	Derry	3-22 - 0-07	Sligo	Owenbeg

30 March 2025 Quarter-Final	Donegal	1-11 - 1-18	Down	GAA Centre Convoy

30 March 2025 Quarter-Final	Mayo	3-14 - 3-24	Tyrone	Ballina Stephenites

==== Semi-Finals ====
5 April 2025 Semi-Final	Tyrone	4-09 - 2-10	Wicklow	GAA Training Centre,Darver

5 April 2025 Semi-Final	Derry	2-16 - 4-15	Down	Owenbeg

==== Final ====
3 May 2025 Final	Down	1-22 (25) - 4-11 (23)	Tyrone	Kingspan Breffni Park

== All-Ireland Under-20 'C' Hurling Championship ==
=== Knockout Stage ===
Quarter finals
30 March, Cloghan
Monaghan	4-22
Cavan	3-07
29 March, Elphin
Leitrim	0-10
Armagh	2-16
30 March, Lisbellaw
Fermanagh	1-06
Louth	2-10

Semi finals
5 April, Cloghan
Monaghan	4-10
Longford	3-12
5 April, Athletic Grounds
Armagh	4-19
Louth	0-09

All-Ireland U20 C Hurling Final
3 May, Breffni Park
Monaghan	1-10
Armagh	2-21

==== Quarter-Finals ====
29 March 2025 Quarter-Final	Leitrim	0-10 - 2-16	Armagh	Orchard Park, Elphin GAA

30 March 2025 Quarter-Final	Fermanagh	1-06 - 2-10	Louth	St. Patrick's Lisbellaw Hurling Club

30 March 2025 Quarter-Final	Monaghan	4-22 - 3-07	Cavan	Cloghan, Entekra COE

==== Semi-Finals ====
5 April 2025 Semi-Final	Monaghan	4-10 - 3-12	Longford	Cloghan, Entekra COE

5 April 2025 Semi-Final	Armagh	4-19 - 0-09	Louth	BOX-IT Athletic Grounds

==== Final ====
3 May 2025 Final	Armagh	2-21 - 1-10	Monaghan	Kingspan Breffni Park

== Statistics ==
=== Top Scorers ===
Overall

Rank	Player	County	Tally	Total	Matches	Average
1	Fred Hegarty	Clare	2-45	51	6	8.50
2	Barry Walsh	Cork	2-43	49	5	9.80
3	Darragh McCarthy	Tipperary	1-40	43	5	8.60
4	Daniel O'Kelly	Dublin	3-25	34	6	5.60
5	Michael Brennan	Kilkenny	1-30	33	5	6.60
6	Fiontan Bradley	Antrim	3-23	32	3	10.66
7	Simon Roche	Wexford	2-22	28	3	9.33
8	Rory Burke	Galway	1-24	27	3	9.00
9	Paddy McCormack	Tipperary	5-10	25	6	4.16
10	Mark O'Brien	Limerick	2-18	24	4	6.00

Single Game

Rank	Player	County	Tally	Total	Opposition
1	Fred Hegarty	Clare	1-12	15	Tipperary
2	Simon Roche	Wexford	1-10	13	Dublin
3	Fiontan Bradley	Antrim	1-09	12	Westmeath
3	Dan Ravenhill	Offaly	0-12	12	Galway
3	Barry Walsh	Cork	0-12	12	Clare
3	Barry Walsh	Cork	0-12	12	Limerick
7	Rory Burke	Galway	1-08	11	Laois
7	Darragh McCarthy	Tipperary	1-08	11	Clare
7	Dylan Corrigan	Westmeath	1-08	11	Meath
7	Fiontan Bradley	Antrim	1-08	11	Meath
7	Michael Brennan	Kilkenny	0-11	11	Tipperary
7	Seánie McElligott	Kerry	0-11	11	Kildare
7	Darragh McCarthy	Tipperary	0-11	11	Limerick
