= 2025 National Hurling League =

2025 Gaelic hurling competition in Ireland and London

League details
- Dates: 25 January – 6 April, 2025
- Teams: 35

League champions
- Winners: Cork (15th win)
- Captain: Robert Downey
- Manager: Pat Ryan

League runners-up
- Runners-up: Tipperary
- Captain: Ronan Maher
- Manager: Liam Cahill

Other division winners
- Division 1B: Waterford
- Division 2: Down
- Division 3: Mayo
- Division 4: Louth

The 2025 National Hurling League, known for sponsorship reasons as the Allianz Hurling League, was the 94th staging of the National Hurling League (NHL), an annual hurling tournament for county teams. Thirty-two county teams from Ireland, and three from England, competed.

2025 saw a new structure, with the league consisting of five divisions, each containing seven teams, and two teams promoted and relegated from each.

It began on the weekend of 25–26 January 2025. Clare were the reigning champions.

On 6 April, Cork defeated Tipperary by 3–24 to 0–23 to win the final, their first league title since 1998.

Offaly's Brian Duignan finished as the league's top scorer with a tally of 1-68 across his seven appearances for the Faithful.

== Format ==
=== League structure ===
Teams by Province and Division
Province	Division 1A	Division 1B	Division 2	Division 3	Division 4	Total
Connacht	1	0	0	3	1	5
Leinster	2	5	2	1	2	12
Munster	4	1	1	0	0	6
Ulster	0	1	4	2	2	9
Britain	0	0	0	1	2	3
Total	7	7	7	7	7	35

The 2025 National Hurling League consists of five divisions of seven teams. Each team plays every other team in its division once. Two points are awarded for a win and one for a draw.

In the top division, Division 1A, teams compete to become the National Hurling League (NHL) champions. The top two teams qualify for the NHL Final.

Teams compete for promotion and relegation to a higher or lower league. In Divisions 1B, 2, 3 and 4, the first- and second-placed teams play in the divisional final and are both promoted, while the bottom two teams of divisions 1A, 1B, 2 and 3 are relegated.

=== Tiebreakers for league ranking ===
As per the Official GAA Guide - Part 1 - Section 6.21 -

If two teams in the same group are equal on points on completion of the league phase, the following tie-breaking criteria are applied:

1. Where two teams only are involved - the outcome of the meeting of the two teams in the previous game in the Competition;

If three or more teams in the same group are equal on points on completion of the league phase, or two teams are tied and drew the match they played, the following tie-breaking criteria are applied:

1. Scoring Difference (subtracting the total scores against from total scores for);
2. Highest Total Score For;
3. A Play-Off.

In the event that two teams or more finish with equal points, but have been affected by a disqualification, loss of game on a proven objection, retirement or walkover, the tie shall be decided by the following means:

1. Score Difference from the games in which only the teams involved, (teams tied on points), have played each other. (subtracting the total Scores Against from total Scores For)
2. Highest Total Score For, in which only the teams involved, have played each other, and have finished equal in (i)
3. A Play-Off

== Division 1A ==
Locations of the 2025 NHL Division 1A teams

=== Table ===
Pos	Team	Pld	W	D	L	PF	PA	PD	Pts	Qualification
1	Tipperary	6	5	0	1	166	138	+28	10	Advance to NHL Final
2	Cork	6	4	1	1	167	126	+41	9	Advance to NHL Final
3	Galway	6	3	0	3	139	163	−24	6	
4	Kilkenny	6	3	0	3	141	137	+4	6	
5	Limerick	6	2	1	3	135	138	−3	5	
6	Wexford	6	2	0	4	117	135	−18	4	Relegation to 2026 NHL Division 1B
7	Clare	6	1	0	5	129	157	−28	2	Relegation to 2026 NHL Division 1B

Source: GAA.ie
Rules for classification: Tiebreakers

=== Division 1A Results ===
==== Division 1A Round 1 ====
25 January 2025 Round 1	Wexford	0-12 (12) – 2-21 (27)	Cork	Chadwicks Wexford Park
17:00		(HT: 0-05 - 1-12)
	Pts: C Byrne 0-7 (0-7f), C Dunbar, R O’Connor, D Codd, C McGuckin, J Redmond 0-1 each	Report	Pts: D Dalton 1-5 (1-0 pen, 0-2f, 0-1 sl), P Power 1-4, B Hayes, D Fitzgibbon (0-2 f) 0-4 each, E Twomey 0-2, S Kingston, S Harnedy 0-1 each	Referee: M Kennedy (Tipperary)

26 January 2025 Round 1	Clare	0-21 (21) – 0-23 (23)	Kilkenny	Cusack Park
14:00		(HT: 0-12 - 0-10)
	Pts: D Reidy 0-8 (0-7f), D Conroy 0-3, S Rynne, P Donnellan, S Meehan, K Smyth 0-2 each, A Shanagher and C Galvin 0-1 each	Report	Pts: B Drennan 0-7 (0-6f, 0-1 ’65), M Keoghan 0-5, M Carey 0-3, E Cody and P McDonald 0-2 each, L Connellan, L Hogan, C Kenny, G Dunne 0-1 each	Referee: S Hynes (Galway); Attendance: ~5,500; TV: TG4 Player

26 January 2025 Round 1	Galway	2-16 (22) – 3-25 (34)	Tipperary	Pearse Stadium
15:45		(HT: 0-09 - 1-13)
	Pts: R Burke 0-4 (0-4f), C Whelan 0-3, J Fleming, D McLoughlin 1-0 each, O Lohan 0-3, K Cooney 0-2 (0-1 sl), L Collins, T Monaghan, C Fahy, T Brennan 0-1 each	Report	Pts: D McCarthy 1-6 (1-0 pen, 0-5f, 0-1 '65), D Walsh 1-3, G O’Connor 1-2, J Morris, W Connors 0-3 each, A Ormond, S O’Farrell, C Morgan 0-2 each, R Maher, J Fogarty 0-1 each	Referee: C Lyons (Cork); TV: TG4

==== Division 1A Round 2 ====
1 February 2025 Round 2	Cork	1-16 (19) – 1-16 (19)	Limerick	SuperValu Páirc Uí Chaoimh
19:30		(HT: 0-08 - 1-07)
	Pts: D Fitzgibbon 0-10 (0-9f), S Barrett 1-0, B Hayes 0-2, S Kingston, L Meade, E Twomey, T O'Mahony (0-1f) 0-1 each	Report	Pts: P O'Donovan (0-1f), A English (0-3f) 0-4 each, W O'Donoghue 1-0, J Gillane (0-1f), A O'Connor, C Lynch 0-2 each, D Byrnes, S O'Brien 0-1 each	Referee: S Stack (Dublin); Attendance: 23,402; TV: TG4 Player

2 February 2025 Round 2	Kilkenny	1-19 (22) – 2-19 (25)	Galway	UPMC Nowlan Park
13:45		(HT: 0-10 - 1-11)
	Pts: E Cody 1-6 (0-6 f), M Keoghan 0-7, C Kenny 0-3, P Moylan, P McDonald and L Hogan 0-1 each	Report	Pts: D McLoughlin 2-2, G Lee, T Monaghan, J Flynn (0-3f) 0-3 each, P Mannion 0-2, C Fahy, J Cooney, T Killeen, C Whelan, J Fleming, C Cooney (0-1f) 0-1 each	Referee: T Walsh (Waterford); Attendance: 5,460; TV: TG4 Player

2 February 2025 Round 2	Tipperary	1-22 (25) – 0-19 (19)	Wexford	FBD Semple Stadium
15:45		(HT: 0-12 - 0-08)
	Pts: D McCarthy 1-7 (1-0 pen, 0-6f), W Connors 0-3, E Connolly, J Morris 0-2 each, M Breen, G O’Halloran, C Morgan, A Ormond, J Forde, J McGrath, O O’Donoghue, J Ryan 0-1 each	Report	Pts: C Byrne 0-7 (0-6f), J Redmond 0-3 (0-1f), M Fanning (0-2f), Darren Codd 0-2 each, R Lawlor, C Hearne, C Flood, C Byrne-Dunbar, S Roche 0-1 each	Referee: J Murphy (Limerick); Attendance: 5,125

==== Division 1A Round 3 ====
8 February 2025 Round 3	Wexford	0-15 (15) – 2-17 (23)	Kilkenny	Chadwicks Wexford Park
17:30		(HT: 0-4 - 2-10)
	Pts: C Byrne 0-6 (0-6f), M Fanning 0-3 (0-3f), R Lawlor 0-2, S Casey (0-1f), C Dunbar, C Hearne, S Roche 0-1 each	Report	Pts: E Cody 0-8 (0-8f), M Keoghan 2-0, C Kenny 0-3, B Ryan 0-2, M Carey, J Molloy, H Shine, B Drennan 0-1 each	Referee: L Gordon (Galway); Attendance: 4,562; TV: RTÉ 2

8 February 2025 Round 3	Galway	2-21 (27) – 0-20 (20)	Clare	Pearse Stadium
19:30		(HT: 2-15 - 0-11)
	Pts: E Niland 0-9 (0-07f, 0-01 '65), A Burns 2-03, T Monaghan, C Whelan 0-02 each, D Loftus, D Morrissey, P Mannion, J Flynn (0-1f), S Linnane 0-1 each	Report	Pts: A McCarthy 0-11 (0-08f), R Taylor, P Crotty, D Reidy 0-02 each, J O'Neill, C Galvin, T Kelly 0-01 each	Referee: M Kennedy (Tipperary); TV: TG4

9 February 2025 Round 3	Limerick	0-30 (30) – 1-23 (26)	Tipperary	TUS Gaelic Grounds
15:45		(HT: 0-15 - 1-13)
	Pts: D Byrnes 0-7 (0-3f), A O’Connor 0-5, A Gillane 0-4 (0-3f), D Reidy, P O’Donovan, A English 0-3 each, C Lynch, E Hurley 0-2 each, E Stokes 0-1	Report	Pts: D McCarthy 0-9 (0-9f), S Kenneally 1-3, J Morris 0-4, A Tynan 0-2, C Morgan, W Connors, M Breen, B O’Mara, G O’Connor 0-1 each	Referee: C Mooney (Dublin); Attendance: 11,213; TV: TG4

==== Division 1A Round 4 ====
22 February 2025 Round 4	Tipperary	2-22 (28) – 1-21 (24)	Cork	FBD Semple Stadium
19:30		(HT: 1-12 - 1-11)
	Pts: D McCarthy 0-10 (0-5 f), J Morris 1-1, J Forde, G O’Connor 0-3 each, D Walsh 1-0, R Maher (0-1 f), C Morgan, W Connors, A Tynan, O O’Donoghue 0-1 each.	Report	Pts: D Fitzgibbon 0-11 (0-6 f, 0-1 65), B Hayes 1-0, P Horgan 0-3 (0-1 f), R O’Flynn 0-2, M Mullins, C O’Brien, S Barrett, J O’Connor, D Healy 0-1 each.	Referee: L Gordon (Galway); Attendance: 11,357; TV: RTÉ 2

23 February 2025 Round 4	Clare	1-17 (20) – 1-23 (26)	Wexford	Cusack Park
13:45		(HT: 1-09 - 0-15)
	Pts: A McCarthy 0-8 (0-7f, 0-1’65), T Kelly 1-4, R Taylor, I Macnamara, P Crotty, D Reidy, R Mounsey 0-1 each	Report	Pts: C Byrne 0-9 (0-6f, 0-2’65), S Casey 1-3, L Chin 0-5 (0-2f), R Lawlor, C Dunbar 0-2 each, J Redmond, K Foley 0-1 each	Referee: T Gleeson (Dublin); Attendance: 4,641

15 March 2025 Round 4	Kilkenny	0-29 (29) – 0-20 (20)	Limerick	UPMC Nowlan Park
15:30		(HT: 0-18 - 0-07)
	Pts: T.J Reid 0-10 (0-8f), M Keoghan 0-7, F Mackessy 0-3 (0-1f), C Kenny, B Ryan, J Donnelly 0-2 each, P Deegan, J Molloy, T Walsh 0-1 each	Report	Pts: D Reidy 0-8 (0-7f), T Morrissey, C Coughlan, A O’Connor 0-2 each, S O’Brien, E Hurley, P O’Donovan, A English, B Nash, D Ó Dalaigh (0-1 each)	Referee: C Lyons (Cork); Attendance: 6,514; TV: TG4

==== Division 1A Round 5 ====
1 March 2025 Round 5	Cork	1-22 (25) – 2-16 (22)	Kilkenny	SuperValu Páirc Uí Chaoimh
17:00		(HT: 1-10 - 2-09)
	Pts: P Horgan 0-10 (0-6 f, 0-1 65), D Healy 1-5, T O’Mahony, S Barrett 0-2 each, C Joyce, D Fitzgibbon, T O’Connell 0-1 each.	Report	Pts: E Cody 0-6 (0-4 f, 0-1 65), B Ryan 1-1, C Kenny, J Molloy 0-3 each, S Donnelly 1-0, M Keoghan, P Deegan, M Carey 0-1 each.	Referee: J Murphy (Limerick); Attendance: 22,193; TV: TG4

1 March 2025 Round 5	Wexford	1-20 (23) – 2-19 (25)	Galway	Chadwicks Wexford Park
17:00		(HT: 0-10 - 1-09)
	Pts: S Casey 0-7 (0-5f, 0-2 '65), R O'Connor 1-2, L Chin 0-5 (0-5f), C Foley, R Lawlor, C Hearne, C Dunbar, J O'Connor, S Reck 0-1 each	Report	Pts: C Cooney 1-2 (0-2f, 1-0 pen), M Garvey 0-5, (0-3f), A Burns 1-1, David Burke, K Cooney, T Killeen (0-2f) 0-2 each, D Morrissey, C Fahy, T Monaghan, C Molloy, S Linnane 0-1 each	Referee: S Stack (Dublin); Attendance: 4,658

2 March 2025 Round 5	Limerick	0-21 (21) – 1-21 (24)	Clare	TUS Gaelic Grounds
15:45		(HT: 0-09 - 0-12)
	Pts: A Gillane 0-8 (0-6f), D Reidy, S O’Brien, B Nash, D Byrnes (0-1 '65), A O’Connor, J Gillane (0-2f) 0-2 each, C Lynch 0-1	Report	Pts: A McCarthy 0-7 (0-6f), J O’Neill, T Kelly, S Rynne 0-3 each, D Reidy 1-0, D Fitzgerald 0-2, C Malone, C Galvin, M Rodgers 0-1 each	Referee: T Walsh (Waterford); Attendance: 16,789; TV: TG4

==== Division 1A Round 6 ====
8 March 2025 Round 6	Limerick	1-27 (30) – 0-18 (18)	Galway	TUS Gaelic Grounds
19:30		(HT: 1-12 - 0-08)
	Pts: S O’Brien 1-3, A Gillane 0-6 (0-4f), C O’Neill, A O’Connor 0-4 each, B Nash, T Morrissey 0-2 each, C Coughlan, K Hayes, A English, C Lynch, P Casey, D Reidy 0-1 each	Report	Pts: C Mannion 0-7 (0-6f), C Cooney 0-6 (0-3f, 0-1’65), G Lee, T Monaghan, T Killeen, S Linnane, B Concannon 0-1 each	Referee: J Owens (Wexford); TV: TG4

9 March 2025 Round 6	Kilkenny	1-19 (22) – 2-25 (31)	Tipperary	UPMC Nowlan Park
13:15		(HT: 1-10 - 2-13)
	Gls: TJ Reid 0-13 (0-11f, 0-2 '65), G Dunne 1-1, M Keoghan 0-4, D Blanchfield 0-1	Report	Gls: D McCarthy 0-12 (0-11f), S O’Farrell 0-3, C Morgan, O O’Donoghue 1-0 each, J McGrath, R Maher, N McGrath 0-2 each, A Tynan, B O’Mara, J Caesar, W Connors 0-1 each	Referee: S Stack (Dublin); Attendance: 9,563; TV: TG4

9 March 2025 Round 6	Clare	0-23 (23) – 6-20 (38)	Cork	Cusack Park
15:15		(HT: 0-09 - 3-09)
	Gls: A McCarthy 0-12 (0-12f), T Kelly, S Rynne 0-2 each, D Fitzgerald, J O’Neill, M Rodgers, S Meehan, R Mounsey, A Shanagher, R Taylor 0-1 each	Report	Gls: D Dalton 2-6 (0-2f), B Hayes 3-1, S Barrett 1-4, E Twomey, P Horgan (0-3f) 0-3 each, B Roche 0-2, S O’Donoghue 0-1	Referee: L Gordon (Galway); Attendance: 11,410; TV: TG4

==== Division 1A Round 7 ====
22 March 2025 Round 7	Cork	4-22 (34) – 0-22 (22)	Galway	SuperValu Páirc Uí Chaoimh
19:30		(HT: 2-12 - 0-12)
	Pts: P Horgan 1-9 (0-6 f), S Barrett 0-4, D Fitzgibbon, T O’Mahony 1-1 each, B Hayes 1-0, D Dalton 0-2 (0-1 f), E Twomey, B Roche, C O’Brien, S Harnedy, A Connolly 0-1 each.	Report	Pts: E Niland 0-7 (0-5 f, 0-1 65), C Mannion 0-5, C Cooney 0-3 (0-1 f), R Burke 0-2, T Killeen, T Monaghan, C Whelan, D McLoughlin, J Flynn (0-1 f) 0-1 each.	Referee: C Mooney (Dublin); Attendance: 20,010; TV: RTÉ 2

22 March 2025 Round 7	Limerick	1-12 (15) – 1-19 (22)	Wexford	TUS Gaelic Grounds
19:30		(HT: 0-07 - 0-09)
	Pts: A Gillane 0-4 (0-4 frees); S O’Brien 1-0; D Byrnes (0-1 free, 0-1 ’65); T Morrissey (0-1 free) 0-3 each; A English, G Hegarty 0-1; each.	Report	Pts: L Chin 0-5 (0-4 frees); K Foley 1-2; C Dunbar 0-3; C Hearne, R O’Connor, S Casey (0-1 free) 0-2 each; J Redmond, C Molloy, D Reck 0-1 each.	Referee: C McDonald (Antrim); Attendance: 4,800

22 March 2025 Round 7	Tipperary	0-22 (22) – 1-18 (21)	Clare	FBD Semple Stadium
19:30		(HT: 0-08 - 0-10)
	Pts: J Forde 0-9 (7 frees, 1 65); E Connolly 0-3 (1 free); J Morris, D Stakelum 0-2 each; R Maher, B McGrath, N McGrath, C Bowe, D Walsh, G O’Connor 0-1 each.	Report	Pts: M Rodgers 1-5 (0-4 frees); T Kelly 0-5 (2 frees); A Shanagher 0-3; C Cleary, D McInerney, R Mounsey, S Rynne, D Reidy 0-1 each.	Referee: C Lyons (Cork); Attendance: 6,531

=== NHL Final ===
TG4

6 April 2025
16:00
Final

Report

Tipperary	0-23 (23) – (33) 3-24	Cork
(HT: 0-12 - 3-16)
Pts: J Forde 0-7 (0-2 '65, 0-1f), D McCarthy 0-4 (0-4f), J Morris 0-3, S Kenneally, D Stakelum, S O’Farrell 0-2 each, A Ormond, A Tynan, G O’Connor 0-1 each		Pts: P Horgan 0-7 (0-5f), D Fitzgibbon 1-4, A Connolly, E Twomey 1-2 each, S Barrett, T O’Mahony, D Healy 0-2 each, B Hayes, C Joyce, T O’Connell 0-1 each

SuperValu Páirc Uí Chaoimh, Cork
Referee: S Stack (Dublin)
Attendance: 43,243

=== Division 1A Scoring Statistics ===
Overall

Rank	Player	Team	Tally	Total	Matches	Average
1	Darragh McCarthy	Tipperary	2-48	54	6	9.00
2	Aidan McCarthy	Clare	0-38	38	5	7.60
3	Darragh Fitzgibbon	Cork	2-31	37	7	5.29
4	Patrick Horgan	Cork	1-32	35	6	5.83
5	Martin Keoghan	Kilkenny	2-24	30	6	5.00
6	Cian Byrne	Wexford	0-29	29	4	7.25
7	Eoin Cody	Kilkenny	1-22	25	4	6.25
8	Brian Hayes	Cork	5-08	23	7	3.29
8	T.J. Reid	Kilkenny	0-23	23	3	7.67
10	Declan Dalton	Cork	3-13	22	5	4.40
10	Aaron Gillane	Limerick	0-22	22	4	5.50

In a Single Game

Rank	Player	Team	Tally	Total	Opposition
1	T.J. Reid	Kilkenny	0-13	13	Tipperary
2	Declan Dalton	Cork	2-06	12	Clare
2	Patrick Horgan	Cork	1-09	12	Galway
2	Aidan McCarthy	Clare	0-12	12	Cork
2	Darragh McCarthy	Tipperary	0-12	12	Kilkenny
6	Aidan McCarthy	Clare	0-11	11	Galway
6	Darragh Fitzgibbon	Cork	0-11	11	Tipperary
8	Brian Hayes	Cork	3-01	10	Clare
8	Darragh McCarthy	Tipperary	1-07	10	Wexford
8	Darragh McCarthy	Tipperary	0-10	10	Cork
8	Patrick Horgan	Cork	0-10	10	Kilkenny
8	Darragh Fitzgibbon	Cork	0-10	10	Limerick
8	T.J. Reid	Kilkenny	0-10	10	Limerick

== Division 1B ==
=== Table ===
Pos	Team	Pld	W	D	L	PF	PA	PD	Pts	Qualification
1	Waterford	6	5	0	1	184	120	+64	10	Advance to NHL Division 1B Final and promotion to 2026 NHL Division 1A
2	Offaly	6	4	1	1	144	121	+23	9	Advance to NHL Division 1B Final and promotion to 2026 NHL Division 1A
3	Dublin	6	4	0	2	165	124	+41	8	
4	Carlow	6	2	2	2	152	156	−4	6	
5	Antrim	6	2	1	3	131	156	−25	5	
6	Laois	6	1	0	5	131	172	−41	2	Relegation to 2026 NHL Division 2
7	Westmeath	6	1	0	5	132	190	−58	2	Relegation to 2026 NHL Division 2

Source: GAA.ie
Rules for classification: Tiebreakers

=== Division 1B Results ===
==== Division 1B Round 1 ====
25 January 2025 Round 1	Offaly	0-19 (19) – 1-16 (19)	Carlow	Glenisk O'Connor Park
14:00		(HT: 0-13 - 1-07)
	Pts: D Nally 0-9 (0-8f), C Mitchel 0-4, D Bourke 0-3, K Sampson 0-2, C King 0-1	Report	Pts: M Kavanagh 0-12 (0-12f), Jake Doyle 1-0, James Doyle 0-2, K McDonald, C Whelan 0-1 each	Referee: C McDonald (Antrim)

25 January 2025 Round 1	Dublin	1-25 (28) – 0-14 (14)	Antrim	Croke Park
17:00		(HT: 1-14 - 0-09)
	Pts: C O’Sullivan 0-13 (0-10f, 0-1 65), C Ó Riain 1-3, Dara Purcell 0-3, C Crummey, J Hetherton 0-2 each, C Burke, C Hayes 0-1 each	Report	Pts: J McNaughton 0-10 (0-8f), N McKenna 0-2, N Elliott, N O’Connor 0-1 each	Referee: J Owens (Wexford); Attendance: 24,160

16 February 2025 Round 1	Westmeath	1-19 (22) – 4-18 (30)	Laois	TEG Cusack Park
14:30		(HT: 0-09 - 2-06)
	Gls: D Williams 0-8 (0-7f), M Cunningham 0-3, N O’Brien 1-0, P Clarke, D Clinton 0-2 each, S Williams, E Keyes, E Cunneen, R Greville 0-1 each	Report	Gls: PJ Scully 2-2 (0-2f), A Dunphy 0-5 (0-5f), J Quinlan 1-1, M Dowling 1-0, J Walshe, A Corby, P Purcell, W Dunphy 0-2 each, D Dooley, T Keyes 0-1 each	Referee: C Cunning (Antrim)

==== Division 1B Round 2 ====
2 February 2025 Round 2	Laois	1-15 (18) – 1-24 (27)	Offaly	Laois Hire O'Moore Park
14:00		(HT: 0-11 - 0-09)
	Pts: A Dunphy 0-7 (0-5f, 1 '65), E Rowland 1-0 (1-0 pen), J Walshe, D Dooley, C Dwyer 0-02 each, A Corby, P Purcell 0-01 each	Report	Pts: B Duignan 0-13 (0-10f), D Ravenhill 0-5, D Nally 1-0, O Kelly 0-2, D Shirley, C Spain, D Bourke, C Mitchell 0-01 each	Referee: A Kelly (Galway)

2 February 2025 Round 2	Carlow	2-21 (27) – 1-19 (22)	Waterford	Netwatch Cullen Park
14:00		(HT: 1-10 - 0-09)
	Pts: M Kavanagh 0-10 (0-6f, 0-1 '65), C Nolan 2-3, P Boland, J Doyle 0-2 each, K McDonald, J McCullagh, C Whelan, J Nolan 0-1 each	Report	Pts: P Fitzgerald 0-5 (0-4f), J Barron, P Fitzgerald (0-1f) 0-4 each, C Sheahan 0-3, S Walsh 1-0, T Barron, J Prendergast, P Curran 0-1 each.	Referee: C Mooney (Dublin)

2 February 2025 Round 2	Antrim	2-25 (31) – 1-19 (22)	Westmeath	Corrigan Park
14:00		(HT: 0-15 - 0-10)
	Pts: J McNaughton 1-14 (0-12f), N Elliott 1-0, N O'Connor, K Molloy, S Elliott, C Johnston 0-2 each, E Campbell, N McKenna, J Maskey 0-1 each	Report	Pts: D Williams 0-12 (0-10f), D Clinton 0-3, J Gillen 1-0 (1-0 pen), E Keyes, P Clarke, R Greville, M Cunningham 0-1 each	Referee: B Keon (Galway); TV: BBC iPlayer

==== Division 1B Round 3 ====
9 February 2025 Round 3	Offaly	2-26 (32) – 0-17 (17)	Antrim	Glenisk O'Connor Park
13:45		(HT: 1-14 - 0-07)
	Pts: B Duignan 0-12 (0-9f, 0-1 '65), K Sampson 1-4, D Ravenhill 1-2 (0-1f), C Mitchell 0-4, D Bourke, R Ravenhill, O Kelly, S Bourke 0-1 each	Report	Pts: J McNaughton 0-9 (0-7f, 0-1 '65), K Molloy 0-3, S Elliott 0-2, N O'Connor, S Walsh, J Maskey 0-1 each	Referee: S Hynes (Galway); TV: TG4

9 February 2025 Round 3	Waterford	1-27 (30) – 0-20 (20)	Laois	Walsh Park
14:00		(HT: 1-13 - 0-12)
	Pts: Padraig Fitzgerald 0-13 (0-12f, 0-1 '65), Patrick Fitzgerald 1-4 (0-1f), J Barron 0-4, S Bennett (0-1f) K Mahony 0-2 each, M Fitzgerald, P Hogan 0-1 each	Report	Pts: T Keyes 0-6 (0-6f), A Dunphy 0-3 (0-3f), J Walshe, P Purcell, J Quinlan, C Dwyer 0-2 each, E Rowland (0-1f), A Corby, D Dooley 0-1 each	Referee: T Gleeson (Dublin); Attendance: 1,792; TV: TG4 Player

9 February 2025 Round 3	Westmeath	0-18 (18) – 1-22 (25)	Dublin	TEG Cusack Park
14:00		(HT: 0-12 - 1-12)
	Pts: D Williams 0-10 (0-4f, 0-1 '65), E Cunneen 0-3 (0-1sl), G Greville, P Clarke, D McCormack, M Cunningham, D O'Reilly 0-1 each	Report	Pts: D Ó Dúlaing 0-9 (0-7f), C O'Riain 1-1, F Whitely 0-3, D Power, David Purcell 0-2 each, D Gray, C Donohoe, Dara Purcell, J Hetherton, B Kenny 0-1 each	Referee: T Walsh (Waterford)

==== Division 1B Round 4 ====
22 February 2025 Round 4	Dublin	1-23 (26) – 0-27 (27)	Offaly	Croke Park
17:15		(HT: 0-14 - 0-10)
	Gls: D Burke 0-8 (0-5f), C Currie (0-3f), C Burke, F Whitely 0-3 each, B Hayes 1-0, P Smyth 0-2, C Donohoe, D Ó Dúlaing, B Kenny, S Currie 0-1 each	Report	Gls: B Duignan 0-13 (0-10f), O Kelly 0-5, D Ravenhill 0-4 (0-2f), D Bourke 0-2, K Sampson, C Mitchell, C Kiely 0-1 each	Referee: C Cunning (Antrim); Attendance: 18,920

23 February 2025 Round 4	Antrim	0-11 (11) – 2-23 (29)	Waterford	Corrigan Park
13:30		(HT: 0-04 - 2-14)
	Pts: J McNaughton 0-6 (0-6f), K Molloy 0-2, S Elliott, E O'Neill, G Walsh (0-1f) 0-1 each	Report	Pts: S Bennett 1-4 (1-0 pen, 0-1f), P Fitzgerald (0-3f), D Hutchinson 0-4, J Barron 0-3, K Mahony 1-0, C Prunty 0-2, C Treen, M Kiely, M Fitzgerald, K Bennett, P Hogan, P Curran (0-1f) 0-1 each	Referee: C Flynn (Westmeath); TV: BBC iPlayer GAAGO

15 March 2025 Round 4	Laois	0-29 (29) – 2-26 (32)	Carlow	Laois Hire O'Moore Park
13:45		(HT: 0-14 - 1-13)
	Pts: A Dunphy 0-16 (0-12f), PJ Scully, T Keyes, A Corby 0-3 each, J Walshe 0-2, C Byrne, F C Fennell 0-1 each	Report	Pts: M Kavanagh 0-13 (0-10f, 0-1 '65), T Joyce 1-2, P Boland 1-1, J Nolan, C Whelan, C Nolan 0-2 each, E Kealy, John Doyle, James Doyle, D Murphy 0-1 each	Referee: B Keon (Galway)

==== Division 1B Round 5 ====
2 March 2025 Round 5	Offaly	1-22 (25) – 0-19 (19)	Westmeath	Glenisk O'Connor Park
14:00		(HT: 1-09 - 0-14)
	Pts: Brian Duignan 0-14 (0-10f, 0-1 '65), O Kelly 0-3, K Sampson 1-0, D Ravenhill 0-2 (0-1f), C Spain, D Bourke, T Guinan 0-1 each	Report	Pts: K Doyle 0-14 (0-11f), É Cunneen 0-2, M Cunningham, N O’Brien, D Williams 0-1 (0-1f)	Referee: M Kennedy (Tipperary)

2 March 2025 Round 5	Waterford	1-23 (26) – 2-18 (24)	Dublin	Walsh Park
14:00
	Gls: S Bennett 0-11 (0-8f, 0-1 '65), P Curran 1-2, D Hutchinson 0-3, K Bennett 0-2, J Barron, G Fives, P Hogan, M Fitzgerald, P Fitzgerald 0-1 each	Report	Gls: C O'Sullivan 2-2, D Burke 0-8 (0-8f), F Whitely, C Donohue 0-3 each, D Ó Dúlaing, B Kenny 0-1 each	Attendance: 5,481; TV: TG4 Player

2 March 2025 Round 5	Carlow	1-21 (24) – 2-18 (24)	Antrim	Netwatch Cullen Park
14:30		(HT: 1-11 - 0-08)
	Pts: C Nolan 1-4 (0-1 sl), M Kavanagh 0-7 (0-5f, 0-1 '65), James Doyle 0-3, F Fitzpatrick, C Whelan 0-2 each, J Nolan, T Joyce, C Kehoe 0-1 each	Report	Pts: J McNaughton 0-8 (0-6f), C Johnston 1-2, G Walsh 1-0 (1-0f), E Campbell 0-2, R McCambridge, E McFerran, C Bohill, N Elliott, C McKeown, K Molloy 0-1 each	Referee: C Mooney (Dublin)

==== Division 1B Round 6 ====
8 March 2025 Round 6	Dublin	2-29 (35) – 3-17 (26)	Carlow	Parnell Park
18:00		(HT: 2-19 - 2-08)
	Pts: D Burke 0-9 (0-6f), B Hayes 1-2, C Burke 0-5, David Purcell 1-1, C Donohoe (0-1 sl), R Hayes 0-3 each, D Gray 0-2, K Burke, C Crummey, F Whitely, D O Dulaing 0-1 each	Report	Pts: J Doyle 0-5 (0-3f), C Nolan, M Kavanagh 1-1 each, C Whelan 0-3 (0-3f), P Boland 1-0, K McDonald (0-1f), J Nolan, T Joyce, C Kehoe, D Murphy, R Coady 0-1 each	Referee: C McDonald (Antrim)

9 March 2025 Round 6	Antrim	4-22 (34) – 0-21 (21)	Laois	Corrigan Park
12:30		(HT: 2-15 - 0-08)
	Pts: J McNaughton 2-11 (0-9f), C Johnston 1-2, K Molloy 1-1, G Walsh 0-3, R McCambridge 0-2, C McKeown, J Maskey, E Campbell 0-1 each	Report	Pts: A Dunphy 0-9 (0-5f, 0-2 '65), P Purcell, P Delaney (0-2f) 0-2 each, C Dwyer, F C Fennell, D Dooley, M Dowling, C Byrne, J Lennon, T Keyes, J Quinlan 0-1 each	Referee: M Kennedy (Tipperary); TV: TG4 Player

9 March 2025 Round 6	Westmeath	0-24 (24) – 7-34 (55)	Waterford	TEG Cusack Park
14:00		(HT: 4-21 - 0-11)
	Pts: K Doyle 0-11 (0-8f, 0-1 ’65), N O’Brien 0-4, D Williams 0-3 (0-2f), M Cunningham, S Williams 0-2 each, D O’Reilly, E Cunneen 0-1 each	Report	Pts: S Bennett 0-10 (0-8f), C Treen 2-3, K Mahony 1-6, D Hutchinson 1-4, S Walsh 2-0, P Curran 1-2, J Prendergast 0-3, C Sheahan, S Bennett 0-2 each, P Fitzgerald, M Fitzgerald 0-1 each	Referee: T Gleeson (Dublin)

==== Division 1B Round 7 ====
22 March 2025 Round 7	Carlow	3-15 (24) – 3-18 (27)	Westmeath	Netwatch Cullen Park
17:00		(HT: 2-07 - 3-08)
	Pts: M Kavanagh 1-7 (0-6f), C Kehoe 1-1, Jake Doyle 1-0, D Murphy 0-2, Jon Nolan, F Fitzpatrick, F O'Toole, J Treacy, John Nolan 0-1 each	Report	Pts: K Doyle 1-15 (1-7f, 0-2 '65), D Williams 2-1, E Cunneen, J Boyle 0-1 each	Referee: J Owens (Wexford)

22 March 2025 Round 7	Laois	0-13 (13) – 2-21 (27)	Dublin	Laois Hire O'Moore Park
17:00		(HT: 0-09 - 1-09)
	Pts: PJ Scully 0-4 (0-3f), A Dunphy 0-3 (0-1 '65), A Corby, J Duggan 0-2 each, M Dowling, F C Fennell 0-1 each	Report	Pts: D Power 1-2, D O Dulaing 0-4 (0-4f), David Purcell 1-0, S Currie (0-2f), C O’Riain, A Jamieson-Murphy 0-3 each, R Hayes, B Hayes 0-2 each, C Donohoe, J Hetherton 0-1 each	Referee: J Owens (Wexford)

22 March 2025 Round 7	Waterford	0-22 (22) – 1-11 (14)	Offaly	Walsh Park
16:00		(HT: 0-10 - 0-06)
	Pts: Stephen Bennett 0-12 (0-8f), P Leavey, T De Burca, J Barron, J Prendergast, D Hutchinson, Shane Bennett, G Fives, T Barron, C Treen, Padraig Fitzgerald 0-1 each	Report	Pts: B Duignan 1-4 (0-2f, 0-1p), K Sampson 0-4, D Bourke, C Mitchell, T Guinan 0-1 each.	Referee: J Murphy (Limerick); Attendance: 2,294; TV: TG4

=== Division 1B Final ===
TG4

6 April 2025
13:45

Report

Waterford	1-27 (30) – 2-20 (26)	Offaly
(HT: 0-17 - 0-06)
Pts: Stephen Bennett 0-12 (0-7f, 0-1 '65), P Curran 1-3, D Hutchinson 0-4 (0-1f), M Fitzgerald (0-1f), J Barron 0-2 each, G Fives (0-1 '65), D Lyons, S Walsh, Shane Bennett 0-1 each		Pts: B Duignan 0-12 (0-6f), O Kelly 2-1, C Spain, C King, D Bourke, K Sampson, C Mitchell, E Cahill, E Burke 0-1 each

SuperValu Páirc Uí Chaoimh, Cork
Referee: M Kennedy (Tipperary)

=== Division 1B Scoring Statistics ===
Overall

Rank	Player	Team	Tally	Total	Matches	Average
1	Brian Duignan	Offaly	1-68	71	7	10.14
2	James McNaughton	Antrim	3-58	67	6	11.17
3	Martin Kavanagh	Carlow	2-50	56	6	9.33
4	Stephen Bennett	Waterford	1-49	52	5	10.40
5	David Williams	Westmeath	2-42	48	6	8.00
6	Aaron Dunphy	Laois	0-43	43	6	7.17
7	Killian Doyle	Westmeath	1-29	32	3	10.67
7	Donal Burke	Dublin	0-25	25	3	8.33
9	Padraig Fitzgerald	Waterford	0-25	25	7	3.57
10	Chris Nolan	Carlow	4-10	22	5	4.40

In a Single Game

Rank	Player	Team	Tally	Total	Opposition
1	Killian Doyle	Westmeath	1-15	18	Carlow
2	James McNaughton	Antrim	1-14	17	Westmeath
2	James McNaughton	Antrim	2-11	17	Laois
4	Aaron Dunphy	Laois	0-16	16	Carlow
5	Brian Duignan	Offaly	0-14	14	Westmeath
5	Killian Doyle	Westmeath	0-14	14	Offaly
7	Cian O'Sullivan	Dublin	0-13	13	Antrim
7	Brian Duignan	Offaly	0-13	13	Laois
7	Patrick Fitzgerald	Waterford	0-13	13	Laois
7	Brian Duignan	Offaly	0-13	13	Dublin
7	Martin Kavanagh	Carlow	0-13	13	Laois

== Division 2 ==
=== Table ===
Pos	Team	Pld	W	D	L	PF	PA	PD	Pts	Qualification
1	Down (C)	6	5	0	1	197	127	+70	10	Advance to NHL Division 2 Final and promotion to 2026 NHL Division 1B
2	Kildare	6	5	0	1	184	102	+82	10	Advance to NHL Division 2 Final and promotion to 2026 NHL Division 1B
3	Kerry	6	3	0	3	148	142	+6	6	
4	Meath	6	3	0	3	145	150	−5	6	
5	Derry	6	3	0	3	120	147	−27	6	
6	Donegal	6	2	0	4	113	141	−28	4	Relegation to 2026 NHL Division 3
7	Tyrone	6	0	0	6	84	182	−98	0	Relegation to 2026 NHL Division 3

Source: GAA.ie
Rules for classification: Tiebreakers

=== Division 2 Results ===
==== Division 2 Round 1 ====
25 January 2025 Round 1	Down	2-19 (25) – 0-22 (22)	Kildare	McKenna Park
14:00		(HT: 2-08 - 0-10)
	Pts: T McGrattan 0-8 (0-05f, 0-1 '65), D Sands, S Pucci 1-1 each, T Prenter 0-3, P Og McCrickard, P Savage 0-2 each, C Egan, F Turpin 0-1 each	Report	Pts: D Qualter 0-11 (0-10f), D Melville, J Burke, G Keegan 0-2 each, D Guerin, M Curtin, D O'Meara, C Dowling, J Travers 0-1 each	Referee: T Gleeson (Dublin)

25 January 2025 Round 1	Meath	2-12 (18) – 1-14 (17)	Donegal	St. Loman's Park
14:00		(HT: 1-07 - 1-06)
	Pts: J Regan 1-7 (0-5f), Cian Rogers 1-2, James Coole, S Ennis, K Gorman 0-1 each	Report	Pts: G Gilmore 0-7 (0-6f), L White 1-1 (1-0 pen, 0-1f), B McIntyre 0-3, D Cullen, S Ward L McKinney 0-1 each	Referee: C O’Regan (Cork)

25 January 2025 Round 1	Tyrone	0-14 (14) – 1-13 (16)	Derry	O'Neill's Healy Park
16:00		(HT: 0-07 - 1-06)
	Pts: A Kelly 0-10 (0-9f), M McCann 0-2, M Little, A Woods 0-1 each	Report	Pts: C McNaughton 0-5 (0-2f), G Bradley 1-1, S Cassidy 0-3, J Mullan 0-2, J Cassidy, R McGill 0-1 each	Referee: C McCloskey (Antrim)

==== Division 2 Round 2 ====
1 February 2025 Round 2	Kildare	2-28 (34) – 0-17 (17)	Kerry	Cedral St Conleth's Park
13:00		(HT: 1-14 - 0-08)
	Pts: D Qualter 1-12 (0-9f, 2 '65), C Dowling 1-2, J Sheridan 0-3 (0-1f), D Guerin, J Burke 0-2 each, S Leacy, D O’Meara, C Boran, P Dolan, D Melville (0-1f), M Curtin, G Keegan 0-1 each	Report	Pts: S Conway 0-11 (0-9f), R Mahony 0-2, A Segal, T Doyle, S Nolan, S Brosnan 0-1 each	Referee: C Flynn (Westmeath)

1 February 2025 Round 2	Derry	0-13 (13) – 2-26 (32)	Down	Derry CoE
14:00		(HT: 0-07 - 0-14)
	Pts: C McNaughton 0-7 (0-5f), R Mullan 0-2 (0-1f), J Mullan, E Cassidy, D Foley, S Quinn 0-1 each	Report	Pts: T McGrattan 0-15 (0-8f, 0-1 '65), T Prenter 1-1, E Sands 1-0, D Sands, P Óg McCrickard 0-2 each, M Conlan, S Pucci, R Beatty, C Taggart, D Toner, B Trainor 0-1 each	Referee: C Cunning (Antrim)

2 February 2025 Round 2	Donegal	1-20 (23) – 0-13 (13)	Tyrone	O'Donnell Park
14:00		(HT: 0-10 - 0-09)
	Pts: G Gilmore 0-6 (0-4f), L McKinney, S Ward 0-4 each, C Gartland 1-0, B MacIntyre 0-3, R McDermott 0-2, P Kelly 0-1	Report	Pts: A Kelly 0-5 (0-4f), C Magill 0-2, C Munroe, B Gormley, A Woods, K Morgan, M McCann, T Mullin 0-1 each	Referee: J Clarke (Cavan)

==== Division 2 Round 3 ====
9 February 2025 Round 3	Kerry	5-20 (35) – 1-12 (15)	Derry	Austin Stack Park
13:00		(HT: 2-12 - 0-04)
	Pts: S Brosnan 2-4, S Conway 1-7 (0-5f), O Maunsell 2-0, R Mahony 0-3, R Walsh, S Nolan 0-2 each, D Moriarty, L Rochford 0-1 each	Report	Pts: M McGrath 1-2, C McNaughton 0-5 (0-4f), R Mullen 0-2 (0-1f), D Foley, S Cassidy, E Conway 0-1 each	Referee: N Malone ( Clare)

9 February 2025 Round 3	Down	3-17 (26) – 0-17 (17)	Donegal	Ballycran
14:00		(HT: 3-07 - 0-07)
	Pts: R Beatty 2-2, T McGrattan 0-5 (0-5f), C Egan 1-2, P Savage, P Óg McCrickard (0-2f) 0-2 each, C Taggart, N McFarland, F Turpin, M Dorrian 0-1 each	Report	Pts: G Gilmore 0-10 (0-9f), B McIntyre 0-3, C Gartland 0-2, L White (0-1f), L McKinney 0-1 each	Referee: J Owens (Wexford)

9 February 2025 Round 3	Tyrone	2-14 (20) – 2-22 (28)	Meath	Garvaghey Centre
14:00		(HT: 1-09 - 1-08)
	Pts: A Kelly 0-10 (0-10f), C Magill 1-1, K Morgan 1-0, M Little 0-2 (0-2f), T Morgan 0-1	Report	Pts: J Regan 0-11 (0-6f), E Fitzgerald 1-3, N Potterton 1-2, C Rogers 0-2, J Kelly, D Shine, J Cole, D O'Higgins 0-1 each	Referee: C Flynn (Westmeath)

==== Division 2 Round 4 ====
22 February 2025 Round 4	Derry	0-17 (17) – 2-25 (31)	Kildare	Derry CoE
15:00		(HT: 0-06 - 1-16)
	Pts: C McNaughton 0-11 (0-6f), R Mullan (0-1f), T Brady, Shea Cassidy, Seán Cassidy, J Mullan, E Conway 0-1 each	Report	Pts: D Qualter 0-10 (0-5f), D Melville 1-5, J Sheridan 1-3 (0-1f), C Boran, J Dolan 0-2 each, C McCabe, P Dolan, G Keegan 0-1 each	Referee: P Owens (Down)

23 February 2025 Round 4	Donegal	5-14 (29) – 3-16 (25)	Kerry	O'Donnell Park
13:00		(HT: 2-01 - 1-10)
	Pts: L McKinney 2-3, C Gartland 1-2, R Campbell 1-1, G Gilmore 0-3 (0-1f), P Kelly 1-0, S McVeigh, C O’Grady, D Coulter, L White (0-1f), B MacIntyre 0-1 each	Report	Pts: R Walsh 1-5 (0-4f), O Maunsell 1-2 (0-1f), T Doyle 1-0, S Nolan 0-3, S Conway (0-2f), S Brosnan 0-2 each, D Shanahan, L Rochford 0-1 each	Referee: C McCloskey (Antrim)

15 March 2025 Round 4	Meath	2-30 (36) – 4-21 (33)	Down	St. Loman's Park
13:30		(HT: 2-22 - 0-11)
	Pts: M Cole 1-5, J Regan 0-8 (0-5f, 0-1 65’), D Healy 1-4, N Potterton, L Byrne 0-3, S Quigley 0-2, S Coloe, D Kelly, K Gorman, J Toher, S Doyle 0-1 each	Report	Pts: T McGrattan 2-12 (0-10f, 0-2 '65), C Egan, B Taggart 1-0 each, P Sheehan 0-3, D Hughes, D Toner 0-2 each, M Fisher (0-1f), L Savage 0-1 each	Referee: E Furlong (Wexford)

==== Division 2 Round 5 ====
1 March 2025 Round 5	Kerry	1-20 (23) – 0-20 (20)	Meath	Austin Stack Park
15:30		(HT: 1-09 - 0-12)
	Pts: P Boyle 1-10 (0-6f, 0-1 ’65), L Rochford, O Maunsell, R Walsh, L Crowley 0-2 each, T Doyle, S Brosnan 0-1 each	Report	Pts: J Regan 0-11 (0-10f), M Cole 0-4, S Quigley 0-2, E Fitzgerald, N Potterton, D Shine 0-1 each	Referee: P Dunne (Laois)

2 March 2025 Round 5	Down	9-26 (53) – 0-13 (13)	Tyrone	Ballycran
14:00		(HT: 6-14 - 0-08)
	Pts: P Óg McCrickard 2-9 (0-6f), D Hughes, C Egan, T Prenter (0-1f) 2-2 each, P Sheehan 0-4 (0-1f), L Savage 1-0, M Fisher 0-2 (0-1f), M Dorrian, C Taggart, B Trainor, P Savage, R Beatty 0-1 each	Report	Pts: M Little (0-1f), A Kelly (0-3f) 0-4 each, T Mullin, B Gormley, K Morgan, L Devlin, C Magill 0-1 each	Referee: C O'Regan (Cork)

2 March 2025 Round 5	Kildare	3-21 (30) – 1-15 (18)	Donegal	Cedral St Conleth's Park
13:00		(HT: 3-12 - 0-06)
	Pts: D Qualter 0-10 (0-7f), J Dolan 1-4, G Keegan 1-2, D Melville 1-1, J Burke 0-3, C McCabe 0-1	Report	Pts: G Gilmore 0-7 (0-6f), L McKinney 0-3, R McDermott 1-0, L White 0-2 (0-2f), D Coulter, D Cullen, C Gartland 0-1 each	Referee: N O Toole (Waterford)

==== Division 2 Round 6 ====
8 March 2025 Round 6	Kildare	2-34 (40) – 0-08 (8)	Tyrone	Cedral St Conleth's Park
15:00		(HT: 1-21 - 0-04)
	Pts: J Sheridan 1-5 (0-2f), J Burke 0-6, M Curtin 1-3, R Boran, P Dolan, Cian Boran 0-4 each, D Qualter (0-2f), J Higgins (0-1f) 0-2 each, D Guerin, D Melville, James Dolan (Celbridge), K Harrington 0-1 each	Report	Pts: A Kelly 0-5 (0-5f), M Little 0-2 (0-2f), C Magill 0-1	Referee: J Clarke (Cavan)

8 March 2025 Round 6	Derry	1-27 (30) – 1-23 (26)	Meath	Derry CoE
16:00		(HT: 1-16 - 1-09)
	Pts: C McNaughton 1-7 (0-7f, 1-0p), R Mullan (0-2f, 0-1 '65), J Mullan 0-4 each, G Bradley 0-3, R Ó Mianáin, E Conway, C Murray, Shea Cassidy 0-2 each, M McGrath 0-1	Report	Pts: J Regan 0-16 (0-11f, 0-1 '65), M Cole 1-0, S Doyle 0-3, N Potterton 0-2, D Shine, D Kelly 0-1 each	Referee: K Parke (Antrim)

9 March 2025 Round 6	Kerry	1-23 (26) – 0-28 (28)	Down	Austin Stack Park
13:00		(HT: 0-15 - 0-13)
	Pts: P Boyle 0-14 (0-10f), L Crowley 0-4, O Maunsell 1-0, P O’Connor, L Rochford 0-2 each, T Doyle 0-1	Report	Pts: T McGrattan 0-11 (0-7f, 0-1 ‘65), P Óg McCrickard 0-5, P Sheehan 0-3, E Sands, T Prenter 0-2 each, M Fisher, L Savage, D Hughes, R Beatty and F Turpin 0-1 each	Referee: N O’Toole (Waterford)

==== Division 2 Round 7 ====
22 March 2025 Round 7	Donegal	0-09 (9) – 2-23 (29)	Derry	O'Donnell Park
14:30		(HT: 0-03 - 0-15)
	Pts: G Gilmore 0-5 (0-5f), C Gartland 0-2, R Campbell, Declan Coulter 0-1 each	Report	Pts: C McNaughton 0-8 (0-6f), E Conway 0-4, R Mullan 0-3 (0-1f, 0-1 '65), S Cassidy 1-1, T Brady 1-0, R Meenan, C Murray 0-2 each, M McGrath, R McGill, P Turner 0-1 each	Referee: P Owens (Down)

22 March 2025 Round 7	Meath	1-14 (17) – 1-24 (27)	Kildare	St. Loman's Park
14:30		(HT: 0-14 - 0-08)
	Pts: J Regan 1-10 (0-9f), N Potterton 0-2, M Cole, J Kelly 0-1 each	Report	Pts: D Qualter 0-13 (0-10f, 0-1 '65), J Sheridan 1-1, P Dolan, J Burke 0-3 each, R Boran 0-2, C McCabe, C Boran 0-1 each	Referee: C Doyle (Tipperary)

22 March 2025 Round 7	Tyrone	1-13 (16) – 1-19 (22)	Kerry	Garvaghey Centre
14:30		(HT: 0-05 - 1-09)
	Pts: S Duffin 0-5 (0-4f), C Bell 0-3, K Morgan 1-0, M Little 0-2 (0-1f), A Kelly, M McCann, R Weir 0-1 each	Report	Pts: P Boyle 0-11 (0-7f, 0-1 '65), S Nolan 1-2, O Maunsell 0-3, N Mulcahy, L Crowley, T Doyle 0-1 each	Referee: M Connolly (Sligo)

=== Division 2 Final ===
Spórt TG4

29 March 2025
13:30

Report

Down	4-22 (34) – 3-18 (27)	Kildare
(HT: 0-11 - 1-10)
Pts: T McGrattan 2-5 (0-4f), E Sands 0-6, T Prenter 1-3, D Hughes 0-4, M Fisher 1-0, (1-0f), C Egan, P Óg McCrickard 0-2 each		Pts: D Qualter 0-7 (0-5f), J Sheridan 2-0, D Melville 1-0, C Boran, P Dolan, G Keegan, J Burke 0-2 each, D Guerin, R Boran, J Higgins 0-1 each

Inniskeen, Inniskeen Grattans GAC
Referee: B Keon (Galway)

=== Division 2 Scoring Statistics ===
Overall

Rank	Player	Team	Tally	Total	Matches	Average
1	Jack Regan	Meath	1-66	69	6	11.50
2	Tom McGrattan	Down	4-56	68	6	11.33
2	David Qualter	Kildare	1-65	68	7	9.71
4	Christy McNaughton	Derry	1-43	46	6	7.67
5	Gerard Gilmore	Donegal	0-38	38	6	6.33
5	Podge Boyle	Kerry	1-35	38	3	12.67
7	Aidy Kelly	Tyrone	0-35	35	6	5.83
8	Pearse Óg McCrickard	Down	2-22	28	7	4.00
9	Jack Sheridan	Kildare	5-12	27	6	4.50
10	Tim Prenter	Down	4-11	23	6	3.83
10	Shane Conway	Kerry	1-20	23	3	7.67

In a Single Game

Rank	Player	Team	Tally	Total	Opposition
1	Tom McGrattan	Down	2-12	18	Meath
2	Jack Regan	Meath	0-16	16	Derry
3	David Qualter	Kildare	1-12	15	Kerry
3	Tom McGrattan	Down	0-15	15	Derry
3	Pearse Óg McCrickard	Down	2-09	15	Tyrone
6	Podge Boyle	Kerry	0-14	14	Down
7	Podge Boyle	Kerry	1-10	13	Meath
7	David Qualter	Kildare	0-13	13	Meath
7	Jack Regan	Meath	1-10	13	Kildare
10	Shane Conway	Kerry	0-11	11	Kildare
10	David Qualter	Kildare	0-11	11	Down
10	Jack Regan	Meath	0-11	11	Tyrone
10	Jack Regan	Meath	0-11	11	Kerry
10	Christy McNaughton	Derry	0-11	11	Kildare
10	Tom McGrattan	Down	0-11	11	Kerry
10	Tom McGrattan	Down	2-05	11	Kildare

== Division 3 ==
=== Table ===
Pos	Team	Pld	W	D	L	PF	PA	PD	Pts	Qualification
1	London	6	6	0	0	130	94	+36	12	Advance to NHL Division 3 Final and promotion to 2026 NHL Division 2
2	Mayo	6	5	0	1	152	112	+40	10	Advance to NHL Division 3 Final and promotion to 2026 NHL Division 2
3	Wicklow	6	3	0	3	137	123	+14	6	
4	Roscommon	6	3	0	3	115	131	−16	6	
5	Armagh (Note: Armagh are ranked ahead of Cavan as they won the head-to-head game between the teams.)	6	2	0	4	108	144	−36	4	
6	Cavan	6	2	0	4	119	133	−14	4	Relegation to 2026 NHL Division 4
7	Sligo	6	0	0	6	101	125	−24	0	Relegation to 2026 NHL Division 4

Source: GAA.ie
Rules for classification: Tiebreakers

=== Division 3 Results ===
==== Division 3 Round 1 ====
26 January 2025 Round 1	London	1-15 (18) – 1-10 (13)	Roscommon	McGovern Park
13:00		(HT: 1-10 - 0-09)
	Pts: D Devine 1-3 (0-1f), S Glynn 0-6 (0-2f), O Shiel 0-3, P Kennedy, E Egan, C O’Carroll 0-1 each	Report	Pts: C Mulry 1-3, B McGahon 0-4 (0-4f), C Kenny, E Fitzgerald, C Cosgrove 0-1 each	Referee: P Dunne (Laois)

26 January 2025 Round 1	Sligo	2-08 (14) – 1-16 (19)	Wicklow	Markievicz Park
14:00		(HT: 2-03 - 1-08)
	Pts: A Kilcullen 1-4 (0-3f), G O'Kelly-Lynch 1-1, P O'Leary, E O'Donoghue, C Hanniffy 0-1 each	Report	Pts: S Germaine 0-8 (0-5f), P Doyle 0-6 (0-1f), D Maloney 1-0, P Doran, A Kavanagh 0-1 each	Referee: J Clarke (Cavan)

16 February 2025 Round 1	Mayo	1-23 (26) – 2-14 (20)	Cavan	Adrian Freeman Memorial Park
14:30		(HT: 0-13 - 0-07)
	Pts: L Lavin 1-5, S Boland 0-7 (0-3f), J Heraty 0-3, S Kenny (0-2f), C Phillips (0-1f), D Huane 0-2 each, E Collins, S Thomas 0-1 each	Report	Pts: L O’Brien 1-7 (0-3f, 0-1 65’), M Moffet 1-0, C Maher 0-3, N Kenny 0-2, J McGuinness, R Delaney 0-1 each	Referee: M Connolly (Sligo)

==== Division 3 Round 2 ====
1 February 2025 Round 2	Wicklow	1-17 (20) – 1-18 (21)	London	Echelon Park Aughrim
13:00		(HT: 1-08 - 1-10)
	Pts: S Germaine 0-9 (0-9f), P Doyle 1-2, J Toomey 0-2, W Kavanagh, L Evans, P Doran (0-1f), S O’Dowd 0-1 each	Report	Pts: D Devine 1-3 (0-2f), D Dawson 0-5, O Sheil 0-4, E Egan 0-2 (0-1f), N Eames, P Kennedy, D Reale, D Leahy 0-1 each	Referee: N O’Toole (Waterford)

1 February 2025 Round 2	Cavan	1-17 (20) – 1-12 (15)	Sligo	Kingspan Breffni Park
15:00		(HT: 0-11 - 1-05)
	Pts: L O’Brien 0-12 (0-8f), C Maher 1-1, T Leonard, E Og McAllister 0-2 each	Report	Pts: A Kilcullen 0-5 (0-4f), G Kelly Lynch 1-0, C Hanniffy 0-3, P O’Leary, E O’Donoghue 0-2 each	Referee: P Owens (Down)

2 February 2025 Round 2	Roscommon	1-22 (25) – 0-10 (10)	Armagh	Dr Hyde Park
14:00		(HT: 0-14 - 0-06)
	Pts: F Killion 1-2, C Kenny 0-5, R Fallon 0-4 (0-4f), J Hardiman 0-3, C Cosgrave, C Murray, A Donnelly, M Egan (0-1f) 0-2 each	Report	Pts: D Magee 0-2 (0-2f), P McNaughton 0-1, 0-7 Unknown	Referee: A Tierney (Tipperary)

==== Division 3 Round 3 ====
9 February 2025 Round 3	London	1-19 (22) – 1-10 (13)	Cavan	McGovern Park
13:00		(HT: 0-07 - 1-10)
	Pts: D Devine 0-8 (0-4f, 0-2 ‘65), C McCormack 1-0, E Egan, O Shiel, S Glynn (0-2 '65) 0-2 each, N Geoghegan, S Whelan, P Kennedy, D Dawson, E Kelly 0-1 each	Report	Pts: L O’Brien 1-3 (0-1f, 0-1 '65), C Maher 0-5, T Leonard, M Moffett 0-1 each	Referee: E Furlong (Wexford)

9 February 2025 Round 3	Armagh	0-16 (16) – 2-19 (25)	Wicklow	BOX-IT Athletic Grounds
14:00		(HT: 0-11 - 1-06)
	Pts: S Harvey 0-5 (0-2f), C McArdle 0-3, D Magee 0-3 (0-3f), J O’Connor 0-2, P McNaughton, C Reneghan, S Keenan 0-1 each	Report	Pts: S Germaine 2-11 (0-8f), W Kavanagh 0-4, T Mulconry, J Toomey, R McMahon, P Doyle 0-1 each	Referee: K Parke (Antrim)

9 February 2025 Round 3	Sligo	0-13 (13) – 1-12 (15)	Mayo	Markievicz Park
14:00		(HT: 0-10 - 1-04)
	Pts: A Kilcullen 0-7 (0-5f), G O’Kelly-Lynch (0-1 pen), P O’Leary 0-2 each, F Connolly, T O’Kelly-Lynch 0-1 each	Report	Pts: L Lavin 1-4 (0-1 ‘65’), S Boland 0-4 (0-4f), R Duffy 0-2, C Phillips (0-1f), D Huane 0-1 each	Referee: A Tierney (Tipperary)

==== Division 3 Round 4 ====
22 February 2025 Round 4	Mayo	1-17 (20) – 2-16 (22)	London	Hastings Insurance MacHale Park
18:00		(HT: 0-06 - 1-08)
	Pts: S Boland 1-4 (0-4f), C Phillips 0-5 (0-3f), L Lavin 0-5 (0-2f), S Kenny 0-2, D Huane 0-1	Report	Pts: D Devine 0-5 (0-4f), E Egan 1-1 (0-1 sl), E Kelly 1-0, P Kennedy, S Glynn 0-3 each, N Geoghegan 0-2, O Shiel, S Whelan 0-1 each	Referee: M Farrell (Roscommon)

15 March 2025 Round 4	Cavan	2-15 (21) – 2-21 (27)	Armagh	Kingspan Breffni Park
12:00		(HT: 1-07 - 1-12)
		Report

23 February 2025 Round 4	Wicklow	4-19 (31) – 2-13 (19)	Roscommon	Bray Emmets GAA
14:00		(HT: 1-12 - 0-07)
	Pts: J Dowling, C Murray 1-3 each, R Fallon 0-3 (0-3f), B Mulry, C Kennelly, C Mulry, B McGahon 0-1 each	Report

==== Division 3 Round 5 ====
2 March 2025 Round 5	Cavan	2-20 (26) – 1-18 (21)	Wicklow	Kingspan Breffni Park
14:00		(HT: 0-06 - 0-09)
	Pts: L O’Brien 1-11 (0-7f), D Mulligan 1-2, S Keating 0-5, J Barry, E Óg McAllister 0-1 each	Report	Pts: S Germaine 0-6 (0-5f), L Evans 1-2, J Toome, T Mulconry, A Kavanagh 0-2 each, D Maloney, R McMahon, P Doyle, W Kavanagh 0-1 each	Referee: A Tierney (Tipperary)

2 March 2025 Round 5	Mayo	3-25 (34) – 1-12 (15)	Roscommon	Hastings Insurance MacHale Park
14:00		(HT: 0-11 - 1-06)
		Report	Pts: C Kenny 1-2, C Cosgrove 0-4, C Murray 0-3, J Dowling, B McGahon, C Mulry 0-1 each

2 March 2025 Round 5	Sligo	1-19 (22) – 3-15 (24)	Armagh	Markievicz Park
14:30		(HT: 0-10 - 3-06)
	Pts: A Kilcullen 0-11 (0-8f), P O’Leary 1-0, G O’Kelly-Lynch 0-3, T Cawley, C Griffin 0-2 each, J Weir 0-1	Report	Pts: P McNaughton 1-5, S Harvey 0-6 (0-5f, 0-1 ’65), C MacArdle, S Keenan 1-2 each	Referee: M Farrell (Roscommon)

==== Division 3 Round 6 ====
8 March 2025 Round 6	Roscommon	1-19 (22) – 0-19 (19)	Cavan	Dr Hyde Park
14:00		(HT: 1-12 - 0-12)
	Pts: B Mulry 1-2, R Fallon 0-5 (0-4f), F Killion 0-4, C Kenny, C Mulry, J Dowling 0-2 each, E Fitzgerald, M Hussey 0-1 each	Report	Pts: L O’Brien 0-9 (0-7f, 0-2 ’65), N Kenny 0-3, S Keating 0-2, R Delaney, T Leonard, D Martin, J McGuinness, D Mulligan 0-1 each	Referee: J Judge (Mayo)

8 March 2025 Round 6	London	2-20 (26) – 0-18 (18)	Sligo	McGovern Park
13:00		(HT: 1-10 - 0-11)
	Pts: D Devine 2-7 (0-5f), D Leahy 0-5, S Glynn, P Kennedy 0-3 each, E Egan (0-1f), T Millerick 0-1 each	Report	Pts: A Kilcullen 0-11 (0-8f, 0-1 ’65), T Cawley 0-4, G O’Kelly-Lynch 0-3	Referee: K Brady (Louth)

9 March 2025 Round 6	Armagh	1-18 (21) – 3-21 (30)	Mayo	BOX-IT Athletic Grounds
14:00		(HT: 1-10 - 1-11)
	Pts: S Harvey 0-11 (0-9f), P McNaughton 0-4, J O’Connor 1-0, S Renaghan 0-2, C Duffy 0-1	Report	Pts: S Boland 1-7 (0-1f), C Phillips 1-3 (0-3f), L Lavin 0-6, J Burke 1-0, M Farrell 0-2, J Heraty, S Kenny, S Thomas 0-1 each	Referee: A McAleer (Donegal)

==== Division 3 Round 7 ====
22 March 2025 Round 7	Armagh	0-10 (10) – 2-15 (21)	London	BOX-IT Athletic Grounds
14:30		(HT: 0-08 - 0-06)

22 March 2025 Round 7	Roscommon	2-15 (21) – 2-13 (19)	Sligo	Connacht GAA CoE
14:30		(HT: 1-07 - 1-07)
	Pts: C Kenny, C Mulry 1-1 each, B McGahon (0-3f), R Fallon 0-3 each, C Cosgrove, B Mulry 0-2 each, E Fitzgerald, J Dowling, C Murray 0-1 each	Report

22 March 2025 Round 7	Wicklow	2-15 (21) – 4-15 (27)	Mayo	Echelon Park Aughrim
13:00		(HT: 0-06 - 1-09)

=== Division 3 Final ===
29 March 2025
13:30

Report

London	1-08 (11) – 0-14 (14)	Mayo
(HT: 1-05 - 0-04)
Pts: D Devine 0-4 (0-2f), P Kennedy 0-3, C O'Carroll 1-0, S Glynn 0-1 (0-1f)		Pts: S Boland 0-6 (0-4f), L Lavin 0-4, S Kenny, J Coyne, C Phillips (0-1f), E Delaney 0-1 each

Manguard Park, Hawkfield
Referee: P Owens (Down)

=== Division 3 Scoring Statistics ===
Overall

Rank	Player	Team	Tally	Total
1	Liam O'Brien	Cavan	3-41	50
2	Seanie Germaine	Wicklow	2-42	48
2	Shane Boland	Mayo	2-42	48
4	Shea Harvey	Armagh	1-40	43
5	David Devine	London	4-30	42
6	Andrew Kilcullen	Sligo	1-38	41
7	Liam Lavin	Mayo	4-28	40
8	Cormac Phillips	Mayo	4-25	37
9	Padraig Doyle	Wicklow	5-14	29
10	Gerard O'Kelly-Lynch	Sligo	2-12	18

== Division 4 ==
=== Table ===
Pos	Team	Pld	W	D	L	PF	PA	PD	Pts	Qualification
1	Louth	6	5	1	0	144	83	+61	11	Advance to NHL Division 4 Final and promotion to 2026 NHL Division 3
2	Fermanagh	6	5	0	1	118	100	+18	10	Advance to NHL Division 4 Final and promotion to 2026 NHL Division 3
3	Leitrim	6	3	1	2	98	106	−8	7	
4	Longford	6	3	0	3	110	111	−1	6	
5	Warwickshire	6	1	1	4	110	125	−15	3	
6	Lancashire	6	1	1	4	114	137	−23	3	
7	Monaghan	6	1	0	5	110	142	−32	2	

Source: GAA.ie
Rules for classification: Tiebreakers

=== Division 4 Results ===
==== Division 4 Round 1 ====
25 January 2025 Round1	Louth	2-18 (24) – 1-12 (15)	Fermanagh	Páirc Naomh Bríd
14:00		(HT: 0-07 - 1-07)
	Pts: D Geoghegan 0-7 (0-6f), P Fortune 1-1, D Stephenson 1-0, L Fox, A Plunkett, M Gahan 0-2 each, S Kettle, J Casey, J Costello, S Phelan 0-1 each	Report	Pts: J Duffy 0-7 (0-5f), D McKeogh 1-1 (0-1 '65), T Duane, C McShea, J McGarry, A McShea 0-1 each	Referee: M Redmond (Kildare)

25 January 2025 Round 1	Longford	4-14 (26) – 3-11 (20)	Warwickshire	Glennon Brothers Pearse Park
14:00		(HT: 1-11 - 0-05)
	Pts: R Murray 0-9 (0-7f), E Tully 1-1, D Hutchinson, R Courtney, D Hayes 1-0 each, N Hawes 0-2, M Flynn, D Crossan 0-1 each	Report	Pts: J Grealish 2-5 (0-4f, 0-1 '65), A Hands 1-0, L Fahy 0-2, D Doherty, O Slattery, I Dwyer, L Hands (0-1f) 0-1 each	Referee: A Kinahan (Offaly)

25 January 2025 Round 1	Lancashire	2-10 (16) – 0-21 (21)	Leitrim	Abbottstown GAA CoE
14:00		(HT: 1-04 - 0-11)

==== Division 4 Round 2 ====
1 February 2025 Round 2	Monaghan	0-11 (11) – 2-23 (29)	Louth	St Mellan's Park
14:00		(HT: 0-07 - 0-11)
	Pts: N Arthur 0-8 (0-6f), E Flynn 0-2 (0-2f), 0-1 unknown		Pts: D Geoghegan 0-10 (0-5f), P Fortune, S Phelan 1-0 each, S Flynn 0-3, J Costello, M Gahan, B Kieran 0-2 each, A Plunkett, C Murphy, J Casey 0-1 each, 0-1 unknown

2 February 2025 Round 2	Fermanagh	1-14 (17) – 0-14 (14)	Longford	Kinawley GAA Grounds
		(HT: 1-06 - 0-10)
	Pts: C Duffy 1-2, J Duffy (0-2f), C McShea 0-3 each, R Bogue (0-2f), S Corrigan 0-2 each, A McShea, C McManus 0-1 each	Report	Pts: R Murray 0-7 (0-6f), D Crossan, E Tully 0-2 each, D Caslin, A Quinn, G Moore 0-1 each	Referee: A McAleer (Donegal)

2 February 2025 Round 2	Warwickshire	1-18 (21) – 3-12 (21)	Lancashire	Páirc na hÉireann
14:00		(HT: 1-12 - 1-05)

==== Division 4 Round 3 ====
8 February 2025 Round 3	Longford	1-11 (14) – 0-17 (17)	Leitrim	Glennon Brothers Pearse Park
14:00		(HT: 0-07 - 0-10)
	Pts: R Murray 0-8 (0-6f), R Courtney 1-0, A Quinn, M Mulcahy, E Tully 0-1 each	Report	Pts: J Murray 0-6 (0-4f), P Burgess 0-4, S O'Riordan, J McNabola 0-2 each, S Goldrick, G O'Brien, D Keane 0-1 each	Referee: M Redmond (Kildare)

8 February 2025 Round 3	Warwickshire	2-07 (13) – 0-25 (25)	Louth	Páirc na hÉireann
14:00		(HT: 2-03 - 0-09)
	Pts: J Grealish 1-5 (0-2f), K Murphy 1-2, l Brannigan, I Dwyer 0-1 each	Report	Pts: D Geoghegan 0-8 (0-6f), C Murphy 0-5, S Flynn 0-4, L Fox 0-3, A Plunkett 0-2, B Corcoran, M Gahan, B Goss Kieran 0-1 each	Referee: J Clarke (Cavan)

9 February 2025 Round 3	Fermanagh	2-14 (20) – 0-15 (15)	Monaghan	Brewster Park
14:00		(HT: 1-09 - 0-08)
	Pts: J Duffy 0-10 (0-7f), T Keenan 1-1, J Tormey 1-0, B Corrigan, A McShea, S Corrigan 0-1 each	Report	Pts: N Arthur 0-8 (0-5f), J Slevin 0-3 (0-1f), N Garland 0-2, L Moloney, E Flynn 0-1 each	Referee: A Kinahan (Offaly)

==== Division 4 Round 4 ====
22 February 2025 Round 4	Longford	2-12 (18) – 2-10 (16)	Lancashire	Glennon Brothers Pearse Park
14:00		(HT: 1-09 - 1-05)
	Pts: R Murray 1-6 (0-5f), E Tully 0-3, D Hennessy 1-0, A Quinn 0-2, D Hutchinson 0-1	Report	Pts: P Burke 0-6 (0-5f), E Clifford 1-1, C McNamara 1-0, A Morgan, C Levingstone, P Moylan 0-1 each	Referee: A Kinahan (Offaly)

22 February 2025 Round 4	Monaghan	3-19 (28) – 0-15 (15)	Warwickshire	Monaghan GAA CoE
14:00		(HT: 1-09 - 0-07)
		Report

23 February 2025 Round 4	Louth	0-13 (13) – 1-10 (13)	Leitrim	Louth GAA CoE
13:15		(HT: 0-08 - 1-08)
	Pts: D Geoghegan 0-8 (0-7f), A Plunkett 0-2, C Murphy, P Fortune, S Flynn 0-1 each	Report	Pts: J Murray 0-6 (0-6f), J McNabola 1-0, P Burgess 0-2 (0-1f), S O'Riordan, S Goldrick 0-1 each

==== Division 4 Round 5 ====
1 March 2025 Round 5	Lancashire	2-10 (16) – 0-30 (30	Louth	Abbottstown GAA CoE
14:00		(HT: 1-05 - 0-18)
	Pts: P Burke 1-4 (0-4f), P Boylan 1-0, C Livingstone 0-2, D McNamara, S O’Boyle, E Clifford, E Costello 0-1 each	Report	Pts: D Geoghegan 0-9 (0-5f), C Murphy 0-6, T McCreesh, P Fortune 0-4, M Gahan, D Stephenson, Leon Fox 0-2 each, Sean Flynn 0-1	Referee: C Doyle Tipperary

1 March 2025 Round 5	Leitrim	1-18 (21) – 0-16 (16)	Monaghan	Glennon Brothers Pearse Park
14:00		(HT: 0-10 - 0-11)
	Pts: J Murray 1-9 (0-7f), P Burgess 0-6 (0-2f), M O'Brien 0-2, S Goldrick 0-1	Report	Pts: N Arthur 0-11 (0-7f, 0-1 ’65), N Gartland 0-3, J Slevin 0-2

2 March 2025 Round 5	Warwickshire	1-12 (15) – 0-18 (18)	Fermanagh	Páirc na hÉireann
12:00		(HT: 1-05 - 0-11)

==== Division 4 Round 6 ====
8 March 2025 Round 6	Fermanagh	0-21 (21) – 1-16 (19)	Leitrim	Brewster Park
14:00		(HT: 0-10 - 1-06)
	Pts: D McKeogh 0-6 (0-5f, 0-1’65), J Duffy 0-4 (0-1f), F McBrien, S Corrigan, J Tormey 0-2 each, Ciaran Duffy, U O’Reilly, R Bogue (0-f), F McKiernan, D Teague 0-1 each	Report	Pts: J Murray 1-7 (0-4f), S Goldrick 0-3, P Burgess 0-2 (0-1f), S O’Riordan, J McNabola, P Lenehan, D Keane 0-1 each	Referee: C Daly (Kildare)

8 March 2025 Round 6	Louth	0-22 (22) – 2-08 (14)	Longford	Páirc Naomh Bríd
14:00		(HT: 0-07 - 1-07)
	Pts: D Geoghegan 0-12 (0-7f), M Gahan, S Flynn, T McCreesh 0-2 each, A Plunkett, B Corcoran 0-1 each, 0-2 unknown	Report	Pts: R Murray (0-1f), Martin Farrell (1-0p) 1-3 each, J Casey, E Tully 0-1 each	Referee: N Barry (Waterford)

8 March 2025 Round 6	Monaghan	0-20 (20) – 4-20 (32)	Lancashire	Inniskeen GAA
14:00		(HT: 0-10 - 4-06)

==== Division 4 Round 7 ====
22 March 2025 Round 7	Lancashire	1-10 (13) – 2-21 (27)	Fermanagh	Abbottstown GAA CoE
14:00		(HT: 0-08 - 0-15)

22 March 2025 Round 7	Leitrim	0-07 (7) – 4-14 (26)	Warwickshire	Connacht GAA CoE
14:10		(HT: 0-02 - 3-09)
	Pts: J Murray 0-4 (0-3f), C McLoughlin 0-2 (0-2f), M Feeney 0-1	Report	Pts: J Conway 0-6 (0-4f), M Connors 1-3, J Collins, K Murphy, L Hands 1-0 each, O Slattery 0-2, E O'Sullivan, J Grealish, L Fahy 0-1 each	Referee: A Kinahan (Offaly)

22 March 2025 Round 7	Longford	3-15 (24) – 2-13 (19)	Monaghan	Glennon Brothers Pearse Park
14:00		(HT: 2-11 - 0-04)

=== Division 4 Final ===
29 March 2025
13:30

Report

Louth	0-16 (16) – 1-08 (11)	Fermanagh
(HT: 0-10 – 1-04)
Pts: D Geoghegan 0-9 (0-3f, 0-4 '65), M Gahan 0-2, P Fortune, S Flynn, S Conneely, P Lynch, D Stephenson 0-1 each		Pts: S Corrigan 1-1, F McBrien 0-3 (0-2f), J Duffy 0-2 (0-1f), J Tormey, L McCusker 0-1 each

St Mellan's Park, Emyvale
Referee: M Connolly (Sligo)

=== Division 4 Scoring Statistics ===
Overall

Rank	Player	Team	Tally	Total
1	Darren Geoghegan	Louth	0-66	66
2	Reuben Murray	Longford	2-36	42
3	Joe Murray	Leitrim	2-29	35
4	John Duffy	Fermanagh	0-32	32
5	Niall Arthur	Monaghan	0-29	29
6	Jack Grealish	Warwickshire	3-11	20
7	Niall Garland	Monaghan	1-12	15
7	Sean Corrigan	Fermanagh	1-12	15
7	Evan Tully	Longford	2-09	15
10	Peter Fortune	Louth	2-08	14
10	Philip Burgess	Leitrim	0-14	14

== Championship Statistics ==
=== Top Scorers ===
Rank	Player	Team	Division	Tally	Total	Matches	Average
1	Brian Duignan	Offaly	1B	1-68	71	7	10.14
2	Jack Regan	Meath	2	1-66	69	6	11.50
3	Tom McGrattan	Down	2	4-56	68	6	11.33
3	David Qualter	Kildare	2	1-65	68	7	9.71
5	James McNaughton	Antrim	1B	3-58	67	6	11.17
6	Darren Geoghegan	Louth	4	0-66	66	7	9.43
7	Martin Kavanagh	Carlow	1B	2-50	56	6	9.33
8	Darragh McCarthy	Tipperary	1A	2-48	54	6	9.00
9	Stephen Bennett	Waterford	1B	1-49	52	5	10.40
10	Liam O'Brien	Cavan	3	3-41	50	5	10.00
