= 2026 National Hurling League =

Hurling competition in Ireland and England

League details
- Dates: 24 January – 5 April, 2026
- Teams: 35

League champions
- Winners: Limerick (15th win)
- Captain: Cian Lynch
- Manager: John Kiely

League runners-up
- Runners-up: Cork
- Captain: Darragh Fitzgibbon
- Manager: Ben O'Connor

Other division winners
- Division 1B: Clare
- Division 2: Laois
- Division 3: Wicklow
- Division 4: Sligo

The 2026 National Hurling League, known for sponsorship reasons as the Allianz Hurling League, was the 95th staging of the National Hurling League (NHL), an annual hurling tournament for county teams. Thirty-two county teams from Ireland, and three from England, competed.

Cork were the reigning champions, but were defeated in the final by Limerick.

== Format ==
=== League structure ===
Teams by Province and Division
Province	Division 1A	Division 1B	Division 2	Division 3	Division 4	Total
Connacht	1	0	1	1	2	5
Leinster	2	4	3	2	1	12
Munster	4	1	1	0	0	6
Ulster	0	2	1	4	2	9
Britain	0	0	1	0	2	3
Total	7	7	7	7	7	35

The 2026 National Hurling League consists of five divisions of seven teams. Each team plays every other team in its division once. Two points are awarded for a win and one for a draw.

In the top division, Division 1A, teams compete to become the National Hurling League (NHL) champions. The top two teams qualify for the NHL Final.

Teams compete for promotion and relegation to a higher or lower league. In Divisions 1B, 2, 3 and 4, the first- and second-placed teams play in the divisional final and are both promoted, while the bottom two teams of divisions 1A, 1B, 2 and 3 are relegated.

=== Tiebreakers for league ranking ===
As per the Official GAA Guide - Part 1 - Section 6.21 -

If two teams in the same group are equal on points on completion of the league phase, the following tie-breaking criteria are applied:

1. Where two teams only are involved - the outcome of the meeting of the two teams in the previous game in the Competition;

If three or more teams in the same group are equal on points on completion of the league phase, the following tie-breaking criteria are applied:

1. Scoring Difference (subtracting the total scores against from total scores for);
2. Highest Total Score For;
3. A Play-Off.

In the event that two teams or more finish with equal points, but have been affected by a disqualification, loss of game on a proven objection, retirement or walkover, the tie shall be decided by the following means:

1. Score Difference from the games in which only the teams involved, (teams tied on points), have played each other. (subtracting the total Scores Against from total Scores For)
2. Highest Total Score For, in which only the teams involved, have played each other, and have finished equal in (i)
3. A Play-Off

== Division 1A ==
Locations of the 2026 NHL Division 1A teams.
Winners; Relegated.

=== Table ===
Pos	Team	Pld	W	D	L	PF	PA	PD	Pts	Qualification
1	Limerick (C)	6	5	0	1	171	135	+36	10	Advance to NHL Final
2	Cork	6	5	0	1	174	132	+42	10	Advance to NHL Final
3	Tipperary	6	3	1	2	169	165	+4	7	
4	Galway	6	3	0	3	162	134	+28	6	
5	Kilkenny	6	2	1	3	134	157	−23	5	
6	Waterford	6	2	0	4	131	148	−17	4	Relegation to 2027 NHL Division 1B
7	Offaly	6	0	0	6	109	179	−70	0	Relegation to 2027 NHL Division 1B

Source: GAA.ie
Rules for classification: Tiebreakers
(C) Champions

=== Matches ===
==== Round 1 ====
24 January 2026 Round 1	Tipperary	1-21 (24) – (19) 1-16	Galway	Thurles
19:00		(HT: 0-09 - 0-09)		Venue: FBD Semple Stadium
		Report		Referee: S Stack (Dublin); Attendance: 7,762

25 January 2026 Round 1	Kilkenny	0-20 (20) – (16) 0-16	Offaly	Kilkenny
14:00		(HT: 0-09 - 0-06)		Venue: UPMC Nowlan Park
		Report		Attendance: ~3,000

25 January 2026 Round 1	Cork	3-25 (34) – (20) 1-17	Waterford	Cork
15:45		(HT: 2-16 - 0-09)		Venue: Supervalu Páirc Uí Chaoimh
		Report		Attendance: 20,464

==== Round 2 ====
31 January 2026 Round 2	Galway	1-21 (24) – (26) 2-20	Cork	Salthill
19:00		(HT: 1-09 - 0-11)		Venue: Pearse Stadium
		Report		Attendance: 8,464

1 February 2026 Round 2	Offaly	1-19 (22) – (39) 5-24	Tipperary	Tullamore
14:00		(HT: 1-10 - 2-12)		Venue: Glenisk O'Connor Park
		Report		Attendance: 5,897

1 February 2026 Round 2	Waterford	1-21 (24) – (20) 0-20	Limerick	Waterford
14:00		(HT: 0-10 - 0-09)		Venue: Azzurri Walsh Park
	Pts: R Halloran (0-11, 10 frees, 1 65); S Bennett (1-2, 1-0 pen); C Treen (0-3); B Nolan (0-2, frees); B Lynch, C Lyons, J Barron (0-1 each).	Report	Pts: A O’Connor (0-8, 7 frees); S O’Brien (0-4); D Byrnes (2 frees), G Hegarty (0-3 each); C Lynch, D Ó Dalaigh (0-1 each).	Referee: C Lyons (Cork)

==== Round 3 ====
7 February 2026 Round 3	Cork	0-29 (29) – (22) 0-22	Tipperary	Cork
19:30		(HT: 0-16 - 0-12)		Venue: SuperValu Páirc Uí Chaoimh
		Report		Attendance: 30,910

8 February 2026 Round 3	Waterford	1-19 (22) – (16) 0-16	Offaly	Waterford
13:45		(HT: 0-10 - 0-09)		Venue: Azzurri Walsh Park
		Report

8 February 2026 Round 3	Limerick	1-26 (29) – (22) 2-16	Kilkenny	Limerick
15:45		(HT: 0-14 - 1-09)		Venue: TUS Gaelic Grounds
		Report		Attendance: 8,958

==== Round 4 ====
21 February 2026 Round 4	Tipperary	0-21 (21) – (36) 0-36	Limerick	Thurles
17:30		(HT: 0-07 - 0-20)		Venue: FBD Semple Stadium
		Report		Referee: C Lyons (Cork); Attendance: 15,221

22 February 2026 Round 4	Kilkenny	1-21 (24) – (23) 1-20	Waterford	Kilkenny
13:45		(HT: 1-11 - 0-13)		Venue: UPMC Nowlan Park
		Report		Referee: Sean Stack (Dublin); Attendance: 7,466

22 February 2026 Round 4	Offaly	0-18 (18) – (29) 2-23	Galway	Birr
14:00		(HT: 0-06 - 0-09)		Venue: St Brendan's Park
		Report		Referee: Johnny Murphy (Limerick)

==== Round 5 ====
1 March 2026 Round 5	Galway	2-18 (24) – (16) 0-16	Waterford	Salthill
14:00		(HT: 2-11 - 0-11)		Venue: Pearse Stadium
		Report		Referee: J Owens (Wexford); Attendance: 4,134

1 March 2026 Round 5	Offaly	0-17 (17) – (25) 2-19	Limerick	Tullamore
14:00		(HT: 0-07 - 0-12)		Venue: Glenisk O'Connor Park
		Report

1 March 2026 Round 5	Kilkenny	1-15 (18) – (21) 3-12	Cork	Kilkenny
15:15		(HT: 0-06 - 1-09)		Venue: UPMC Nowlan Park
		Report

==== Round 6 ====
7 March 2026 Round 6	Galway	0-35 (35) – (17) 0-17	Kilkenny	Salthill
17:15		(HT: 0-15 - 0-09)		Venue: Pearse Stadium
		Report		Referee: C. Lyons (Cork); Attendance: 5,467

7 March 2026 Round 6	Limerick	3-19 (28) – (20) 0-20	Cork	Limerick
19:00		(HT: 1-09 - 0-11)		Venue: TUS Gaelic Grounds
		Report		Attendance: 18,744

15 March 2026 Round 6	Waterford	1-23 (26) – (30) 2-24	Tipperary	Waterford
14:00		(HT: 1-17 - 1-09)		Venue: Azzurri Walsh Park
				Attendance: 5,689

Waterford's game against Tipperary was postponed due to bereavement.

==== Round 7 ====
21 March 2026 Round 7	Cork	6-26 (44) – (20) 0-20	Offaly	Cork
19:00		(HT: 3-10 - 0-07)		Venue: SuperValu Páirc Uí Chaoimh
		Report		Referee: Johnny Murphy (Limerick); Attendance: 19,653

21 March 2026 Round 7	Limerick	2-27 (33) – (31) 0-31	Galway	Limerick
19:00		(HT: 1-16 - 0-09)		Venue: TUS Gaelic Grounds
		Report		Referee: Chris Mooney (Dublin); Attendance: 14,108

21 March 2026 Round 7	Tipperary	2-27 (33) – (33) 3-24	Kilkenny	Thurles
19:00		(HT: 1-14 - 1-13)		Venue: FBD Semple Stadium
		Report		Referee: J Owens (Wexford); Attendance: 10,240

=== NHL Final ===
TG4

5 April 2026
16:00
Final

Report

Cork	1-21 (24) – (30) 1-27	Limerick
(HT: 1-10 – 1-13)
Gls: Brian Hayes 1 Pts: Alan Connolly 7fs, Brian Hayes 3, William Buckley 3, Darragh Fitzgibbon 2, Tim O’Mahony 2 (1f), Tommy O’Connell 1, Hugh O’Connor 1, Seamus Harnedy 1, Mark Coleman 1		Gls: Aaron Gillane 1 Pts: Aidan O’Connor 8 (7fs, 1 65), Aaron Gillane 7 (3fs), Adam English 3, Diarmaid Byrnes 3 (1f, 1 65), Cathal O’Neill 2, Gearoid Hegarty 2, Shane O’Brien 1, David Reidy 1

TUS Gaelic Grounds, Limerick
Referee: Shane Hynes (Galway)
Attendance: 41,678

=== Division 1A Scoring Statistics ===
Rank	Player	Team	Tally	Total	Matches	Average
1	Aidan O'Connor	Limerick	1-63	66	7	9.42
2	Reuben Halloran	Waterford	1-45	48	6	8.00
3	Adam Screeney	Offaly	0-43	43	6	7.16
4	Cathal Mannion	Galway	1-37	40	6	6.66
5	Alan Connolly	Cork	1-36	39	6	6.50
6	Aaron Niland	Galway	0-37	37	6	6.16
7	Jason Forde	Tipperary	3-26	35	4	8.75
8	Cian Kenny	Kilkenny	0-30	30	5	6.00
9	Brian Hayes	Cork	6-09	27	6	4.50
9	Eoin Cody	Kilkenny	2-21	27	6	4.50

== Division 1B ==
=== Table ===
Pos	Team	Pld	W	D	L	PF	PA	PD	Pts	Qualification
1	Clare	6	6	0	0	194	129	+65	12	Advance to NHL Division 1B Final and promotion to 2027 NHL Division 1A
2	Dublin (Note: Dublin–Wexford was a draw, so the two teams are ranked by score difference.)	6	4	1	1	199	126	+73	9	Advance to NHL Division 1B Final and promotion to 2027 NHL Division 1A
3	Wexford	6	4	1	1	169	138	+31	9	
4	Kildare	6	3	0	3	145	158	−13	6	
5	Antrim (Note: Teams ranked by score difference.)	6	1	0	5	130	159	−29	2	
6	Carlow	6	1	0	5	120	169	−49	2	Relegation to 2027 NHL Division 2
7	Down	6	1	0	5	129	207	−78	2	Relegation to 2027 NHL Division 2

Source: GAA.ie
Rules for classification: Tiebreakers

=== Matches ===
==== Round 1 ====
24 January 2026 Round 1	Carlow	2-18 (24) – (14) 1-11	Down	Carlow
14:30		(HT: 0-08 - 1-09)		Venue: Netwatch Cullen Park
		Report		Referee: N Malone (Clare)

24 January 2026 Round 1	Wexford	1-13 (16) – (15) 1-12	Antrim	Wexford
16:00		(HT: 0-06 - 0-09)		Venue: Chadwicks Wexford Park
		Report		Referee: Thomas Walsh (Waterford); Attendance: 1,831

25 January 2026 Round 1	Clare	3-18 (27) – (25) 1-22	Dublin	Ennis
14:00		(HT: 2-08 - 0-11)		Venue: Zimmer Biomet Cusack Park
		Report		Attendance: 7,553

==== Round 2 ====
31 January 2026 Round 2	Dublin	2-19 (25) – (11) 0-11	Kildare	Dublin
19:30		(HT: 2-08 - 0-05)		Venue: Parnell Park
		Report

1 February 2026 Round 2	Antrim	1-19 (22) – (36) 2-30	Clare	Cushendall
13:00		(HT: 0-07 - 1-13)		Venue: Páirc Mhuire
		Report

1 February 2026 Round 2	Down	0-25 (25) – (27) 0-27	Wexford	Ballycran
14:00		(HT: 0-12 - 0-20)		Venue: McKenna Park
		Report

==== Round 3 ====
7 February 2026 Round 3	Wexford	2-28 (34) – (24) 1-21	Carlow	Wexford
17:15		(HT: 1-14 - 1-11)		Venue: Chadwicks Wexford Park

8 February 2026 Round 3	Clare	3-35 (44) – (15) 0-15	Down	Ennis
13:30		(HT: 0-22 - 0-07)		Venue: ZImmer Biomet Cusack Park
		Report		Attendance: 4,960

8 February 2026 Round 3	Kildare	3-21 (30) – (20) 0-20	Antrim	Newbridge
14:00		(HT: 0-14 - 0-11)		Venue: Cedral St Conleth's Park
		Report

==== Round 4 ====
21 February 2026 Round 4	Dublin	4-19 (31) – (31) 3-22	Wexford	Dublin
17:00		(HT: 2-08 - 1-13)		Venue: Croke Park
				Attendance: 25,027

21 February 2026 Round 4	Kildare	3-14 (23) – (27) 0-27	Clare	Newbridge
18:30		(HT: 2-08 - 0-12)		Venue: Cedral St Conleth's Park

22 February 2026 Round 4	Antrim	0-25 (25) – (12) 0-12	Carlow	Dunloy
13:00		(HT: 0-10 - 0-09)		Venue: Pearse Park

==== Round 5 ====
28 February 2026 Round 5	Carlow	0-18 (18) – (31) 1-28	Clare	Carlow
18:00		(HT: 0-08 - 1-15)		Venue: Netwatch Cullen Park

1 March 2026 Round 5	Down	1-23 (26) – (33) 3-24	Kildare	Ballycran
13:00		(HT: 0-08 - 2-15)		Venue: McKenna Park

1 March 2026 Round 5	Antrim	1-16 (19) – (34) 1-31	Dublin	Dunloy
14:00		(HT: 1-08 - 0-20)		Venue: Pearse Park

==== Round 6 ====
7 March 2026 Round 6	Dublin	6-32 (50) – (18) 0-18	Down	Dublin
17:00		(HT: 3-15 - 0-11)		Venue: Parnell Park

8 March 2026 Round 6	Clare	0-26 (26) – (23) 1-20	Wexford	Ennis
13:15		(HT: 0-15 - 0-09)		Venue: Zimmer Biomet Cusack Park
		Report		Referee: Liam Gordon (Gaillimh); Attendance: 6,575

8 March 2026 Round 6	Kildare	3-22 (31) – (22) 1-19	Carlow	Newbridge
14:00		(HT: 0-17 - 0-08)		Venue: Cedral St Conleth's Park

==== Round 7 ====
21 March 2026 Round 7	Carlow	2-14 (20) – (34) 0-34	Dublin	Carlow
17:00		(HT: 2-09 - 0-18)		Venue: Netwatch Cullen Park

21 March 2026 Round 7	Down	3-22 (31) – (29) 3-20	Antrim	Newry
17:00		(HT: 2-11 - 1-09)		Venue: Páirc Esler

21 March 2026 Round 7	Wexford	3-29 (38) – (17) 1-14	Kildare	Wexford
17:00		(HT: 1-10 - 0-08)		Venue: Chadwicks Wexford Park

=== Division 1B Final ===
TG4

5 April 2026
13:45
Final

Report

Clare	2-26 (32) – (29) 3-20	Dublin
(HT: 2-15 – 2-05)
Gls: S Meehan 1, S O’Donnell 1 Pts: M Rodgers 12 (9fs), P Duggan 4 (3fs), S Meehan 3, D Ryan 3, R Taylor 2, S O’Donnell 1, I Galvin 1		Gls: C O’Sullivan 1, F Whitely 1, J Hetherton 1pen Pts: C O’Sullivan 10 (6fs), C Donohoe 4, D Power 2, D Ó Dúlaing 1f, B Hayes 1, D Purcell 1, F Whitely 1

TUS Gaelic Grounds, Limerick
Referee: Thomas Walsh

=== Division 1B Scoring Statistics ===
Rank	Player	Team	Tally	Total	Matches	Average
1	Mark Rodgers	Clare	1-62	65	7	9.28
2	Seann Elliott	Antrim	1-53	56	6	9.33
3	Simon Roche	Wexford	1-51	54	6	9.00
4	Dónal Burke	Dublin	1-48	51	6	8.50
5	Pearse Óg McCrickard	Down	0-36	36	5	7.20
6	Marty Kavaangh	Carlow	1-32	35	6	5.83
7	David Qualter	Kildre	1-30	33	4	8.25
8	Jack Sheridan	Kildare	2-26	32	5	6.40
9	Cian O'Sullivan	Dublin	2-20	26	5	5.20
10	Shane Meehan	Clare	3-16	25	7	3.57
10	Chris Nolan	Carlow	1-22	25	5	5.00

== Division 2 ==
=== Table ===
Pos	Team	Pld	W	D	L	PF	PA	PD	Pts	Qualification
1	Laois	6	6	0	0	177	100	+77	12	Advance to NHL Division 2 Final and promotion to 2027 NHL Division 1B
2	Kerry (Note: Kerry–Westmeath was a draw, so the two teams are ranked by score difference.)	6	4	1	1	177	107	+70	9	Advance to NHL Division 2 Final and promotion to 2027 NHL Division 1B
3	Westmeath	6	4	1	1	156	124	+32	9	
4	Meath	6	3	0	3	117	126	−9	6	
5	London	6	1	1	4	117	159	−42	3	
6	Derry	6	1	0	5	115	146	−31	2	Relegation to 2027 NHL Division 3
7	Mayo	6	0	1	5	99	196	−97	1	Relegation to 2027 NHL Division 3

Source: GAA.ie
Rules for classification: Tiebreakers

=== Matches ===
==== Round 1 ====
24 January 2026 Round 1	Meath	1-20 (23) – (13) 1-10	London	Trim
12:30		(HT: 1-05 - 0-08)		Venue: St. Loman's Park

24 January 2026 Round 1	Derry	0-12 (12) – (38) 5-23	Kerry	Derry
13:00		(HT: 0-05 - 3-16)		Venue: Celtic Park

25 January 2026 Round 1	Mayo	0-12 (12) – (41) 6-23	Laois	Tooreen
13:00		(HT: 0-01 - 5-15)		Venue: Adrian Freeman Park

==== Round 2 ====
1 February 2026 Round 2	Laois	0-25 (25) – (15) 0-15	Derry	Portlaoise
13:00		(HT: 0-13 - 0-06)		Venue: Laois Hire O'Moore Park

1 February 2026 Round 2	London	0-19 (19) – (19) 1-16	Mayo	Ruislip
13:00		(HT: 0-07 - 0-08)		Venue: McGovern Park

1 February 2026 Round 2	Kerry	2-11 (17) – (17) 0-17	Westmeath	Tralee
14:00		(HT: 2-05 - 0-07)		Venue: Austin Stack Park

==== Round 3 ====
7 February 2026 Round 3	Kerry	5-21 (36) – (24) 1-21	London	Tralee
12:30		(HT: 4-11 - 0-08)		Venue: Austin Stack Park

7 February 2026 Round 3	Derry	2-25 (31) – (21) 0-21	Mayo	Derry
13:00		(HT: 2-12 - 0-11)		Venue: Celtic Park

8 February 2026 Round 3	Westmeath	0-25 (25) – (22) 1-19	Meath	Mullingar
14:00		(HT: 0-15 - 0-10)		Venue: TEG Cusack Park

==== Round 4 ====
21 February 2026 Round 4	Laois	1-18 (21)) – (20 1-17	Kerry	Portlaoise
14:00		(HT: 0-08 - 0-09)		Venue: Laois Hire O'Moore Park

22 February 2026 Round 4	London	0-20 (20) – (31) 3-22	Westmeath	Ruislip
13:00		(HT: 0-07 - 2-14)		Venue: McGovern Park

22 February 2026 Round 4	Meath	1-20 (23) – (21) 1-18	Derry	Trim
13:00		(HT: 0-07 - 1-12)		Venue: St Loman's Park

==== Round 5 ====
28 February 2026 Round 5	Derry	0-14 (14) – (16) 3-07	London	Derry
13:00		(HT: 0-07 - 3-05)		Venue: Celtic Park

28 February 2026 Round 5	Mayo	1-12 (15) – (20) 0-20	Meath	Tooreen
14:00		(HT: 0-03 - 0-16)		Venue: Adrian Freeman Park

1 March 2026 Round 5	Westmeath	0-17 (17) – (26) 1-23	Laois	Mullingar
14:00		(HT: 0-09 - 0-09)		Venue: TEG Cusack Park

==== Round 6 ====
8 March 2026 Round 6	Kerry	6-24 (42) – 0-15 (15)	Mayo	Tralee
14:00		(HT: 4-17 - 0-05)		Venue: Austin Stack Park

8 March 2026 Round 6	Laois	0-28 (28) – (11) 0-11	Meath	Portlaoise
14:00		(HT: 0-11 - 0-07)		Venue: Laois Hire O'Moore Park

8 March 2026 Round 6	Westmeath	1-20 (23) – (22) 3-13	Derry	Mullingar
14:00		(HT: 0-15 - 0-06)		Venue: TEG Cusack Park

==== Round 7 ====
21 March 2026 Round 7	London	1-22 (25) – (36) 3-27	Laois	Ruislip
13:00		(HT: 1-14 - 3-14)		Venue: McGovern Park

21 March 2026 Round 7	Mayo	1-14 (17) – (43) 2-37	Westmeath	Castlebar
13:00		(HT: 1-06 - 0-21)		Venue: Tooreen

21 March 2026 Round 7	Meath	0-18 (18) – (24) 2-18	Kerry	Trim
13:00		(HT: 0-08 - 1-12)		Venue: St Loman's Park

=== Division 2 Final ===
Spórt TG4 YouTube

28 March 2026
14:00 IWT (UTC±0)

Report

Laois	3-18 (27) – (13) 0-13	Kerry
(HT: 2-11 - 0-08)
Pts: Aaron Dunphy 0-11 (0-7 frees), Tomas Keyes 1-2, Cillian Dunne and Fiachra C Fennell 1-0 each, Jack Kelly, Aidan Corby, David Dooley, Cody Comerford, and Ben Conroy 0-1 each		Pts: Liam Óg O’Connor 0-4 (0-3 frees), Ronan Walsh 0-3 (0-2 frees), Jordan Brick 0-2, Tom Doyle, Michael Slattery, Michael Leane, and Padraig Boyle 0-1 each

O'Moore Park, Portlaoise

=== Division 2 Scoring Statistics ===
Overall

Rank	Player	Team	Tally	Total	Matches	Average
1	Ronan Walsh	Kerry	5-36	51	5	10.20
2	David Williams	Westmeath	1-42	45	5	9.00
3	Shea Cassidy	Derry	2-35	41	6	6.83
4	Aaron Dunphy	Laois	0-39	39	5	7.80
5	Fionn Ó Riain Broin	London	1-35	38	5	7.60
6	Tom Shine	Meath	0-37	37	5	7.40
7	Oisín Maunsell	Kerry	5-21	36	5	7.20
8	Ryan Duffy	Mayo	0-33	33	5	6.60
9	Cormac Phillips	Mayo	1-21	24	5	4.80
10	Tomás Keyes	Laois	1-20	23	5	4.60

== Division 3 ==
=== Table ===
Pos	Team	Pld	W	D	L	PF	PA	PD	Pts	Qualification
1	Wicklow	6	5	0	1	160	78	+82	10	Advance to NHL Division 3 Final and promotion to 2027 NHL Division 2
2	Donegal	6	5	0	1	166	94	+72	10	Advance to NHL Division 3 Final and promotion to 2027 NHL Division 2
3	Roscommon	6	4	1	1	129	118	+11	9	
4	Tyrone	6	3	1	2	134	121	+13	7	
5	Louth	6	2	0	4	102	146	−44	4	
6	Fermanagh	6	0	1	5	110	177	−67	1	Relegation to 2027 NHL Division 4
7	Armagh	6	0	1	5	84	151	−67	1	Relegation to 2027 NHL Division 4

Source: GAA.ie
Rules for classification: Tiebreakers

=== Matches ===
==== Round 1 ====
24 January 2026 Round 1	Armagh	1-15 (18) – (23) 1-20	Louth	Armagh
14:00		(HT: 0-08 - 0-13)		Venue: BOX-IT Athletic Grounds

25 January 2026 Round 1	Roscommon	2-15 (21) – (19) 1-16	Wicklow	Roscommon
14:00		(HT: 0-08 - 1-07)		Venue: King & Moffatt Dr Hyde Park

25 January 2026 Round 1	Tyrone	1-18 (21) – (32) 3-23	Donegal	Omagh
14:00		(HT: 1-09 - 1-12)		Venue: O'Neill's Healy Park

==== Round 2 ====
31 January 2026 Round 2	Louth	0-16 (16) – (24) 2-18	Tyrone	Darver
14:00		(HT: 0-10 - 0-13)		Venue: Protection & Prosperity Louth GAA Training Centre

31 January 2026 Round 2	Donegal	2-35 (41) – (9) 0-09	Fermanagh	Letterkenny
14:00		(HT: 0-19 - 0-02)		Venue: O'Donnell Park

1 February 2026 Round 2	Wicklow	2-26 (32) – (10) 0-10	Armagh	Aughrim
14:00		(HT: 1-11 - 0-06)		Venue: Echelon Park

==== Round 3 ====
7 February 2026 Round 3	Armagh	0-12 (12) – (23) 2-17	Roscommon	Armagh
14:30		(HT: 0-08 - 2-11)		Venue: BOX-IT Athletic Grounds

8 February 2026 Round 3	Fermanagh	2-19 (25) – (29) 3-20	Louth	Enniskillen
14:00		(HT: 0-13 - 2-11)		Venue: Brewster Park

8 February 2026 Round 3	Tyrone	0-15 (15) – (23) 3-14	Wicklow	Omagh
14:00		(HT: 0-08 - 2-04)		Venue: O'Neills Healy Park

==== Round 4 ====
21 February 2026 Round 4	Donegal	1-18 (21) – (12) 1-09	Armagh	Letterkenny
14:00		(HT: 1-10 - 1-02)		Venue: O'Donnell Park

21 February 2026 Round 4	Fermanagh	1-17 (20) – (24) 2-18	Tyrone	Enniskillen
14:00		(HT: 0-10 - 0-07)		Venue: Brewster Park

21 February 2026 Round 4	Louth	0-11 (11) – (14) 0-14	Roscommon	Darver
14:00		(HT: 0-06 - 0-05)		Venue: Protection & Prosperity Louth GAA Training Centre

==== Round 5 ====
28 February 2026 Round 5	Roscommon	1-16 (19) – (19) 0-19	Tyrone	Roscommon
14:30		(HT: 1-08 - 0-10)		Venue: King & Moffatt Dr Hyde Park

1 March 2026 Round 5	Louth	1-09 (12) – (29) 3-20	Donegal	Darver
14:00		(HT: 0-04 - 1-11)		Venue: Protection & Prosperity Louth GAA Training Centre

1 March 2026 Round 5	Wicklow	5-14 (29) – (7) 0-07	Fermanagh	Aughrim
14:00		(HT: 2-10 - 0-03)		Venue: Echelon Park

==== Round 6 ====
7 March 2026 Round 7	Tyrone	3-22 (31) – (11) 0-11	Armagh	Garvaghey
14:00		(HT: 3-14 - 0-04)		Venue: Tyrone Centre of Excellence

8 March 2026 Round 6	Donegal	0-14 (14) – (21) 0-21	Wicklow	Letterkenny
14:00		(HT: 0-06 - 0-11)		Venue: O'Donnell Park

8 March 2026 Round 6	Fermanagh	2-22 (28) – (33) 5-18	Roscommon	Enniskillen
14:00		(HT: 0-13 - 5-11)		Venue: Brewster Park

==== Round 7 ====
21 March 2026 Round 7	Armagh	0-21 (21) – (21) 1-18	Fermanagh	Armagh
14:00		(HT: 0-13 - 1-09)		Venue: BOX-IT Athletic Grounds

21 March 2026 Round 7	Roscommon	0-19 (19) – (29) 3-20	Donegal	Roscommon
14:00		(HT: 0-12 - 3-10)		Venue: King & Moffatt Dr Hyde Park

21 March 2026 Round 7	Wicklow	3-27 (36) – (11) 0-11	Louth	Aughrim
14:00		(HT: 2-13 - 0-05)		Venue: Echelon Park

=== Division 3 Final ===
28 March 2026
14:00 IWT (UTC±0)

Wicklow	3-16 (25) – (24) 2-18	Donegal
(HT: 0-09 - 1-11)

Echelon Park, Aughrim

=== Division 3 Scoring Statistics ===
Overall

Rank	Player	Team	Tally	Total	Matches	Average
1	Gerard Gilmore	Donegal	0-44	44	5	8.80
2	Pádraig Doyle	Wicklow	4-28	40	5	8.00
3	Darren Geoghegan	Louth	0-36	36	5	7.20
4	Conor Morris	Roscommon	2-29	35	5	7.00
5	Michael Little	Tyrone	0-30	30	6	5.00
6	Aiden Kelly	Tyrone	1-26	29	6	4.83
7	Liam McKinney	Donegal	0-28	28	5	5.60
8	Jack Loughran	Armagh	0-27	27	5	5.40
9	Richie Ryan	Donegal	5-09	24	5	4.80
10	Seán Corrigan	Fermanagh	1-20	23	5	4.60

== Division 4 ==
=== Table ===
Pos	Team	Pld	W	D	L	PF	PA	PD	Pts	Qualification
1	Sligo	6	6	0	0	205	76	+129	12	Advance to NHL Division 4 Final and promotion to 2027 NHL Division 3
2	Longford	6	4	1	1	129	113	+16	9	Advance to NHL Division 4 Final and promotion to 2027 NHL Division 3
3	Leitrim	6	4	0	2	149	112	+37	8	
4	Cavan	6	3	0	3	111	132	−21	6	
5	Warwickshire	6	2	1	3	92	144	−52	5	
6	Monaghan	6	1	0	5	89	135	−46	2	
7	Lancashire	6	0	0	6	103	166	−63	0	

Source: GAA.ie
Rules for classification: Tiebreakers

=== Matches ===
==== Round 1 ====
24 January 2026 Round 1	Cavan	3-13 (22) – (16) 1-13	Warwickshire	Cavan
13:00		(HT: 1-05 - 1-07)		Venue: Kingspan Breffni Park

24 January 2026 Round 1	Leitrim	0-20 (20) – (23) 2-17	Longford	Carrick-on-Shannon
14:00		(HT: 0-10 - 1-11)		Venue: Heartland Credit Union Páirc Seán MacDiarmada

24 January 2026 Round 1	Monaghan	0-08 (8) – (26) 2-20	Sligo	Inniskeen
14:00		(HT: 0-03 - 0-13)		Venue: Grattan Park

==== Round 2 ====
31 January 2026 Round 2	Leitrim	0-18 (18) – (26) 2-20	Sligo	Carrick-on-Shannon
14:00		(HT: 0-08 - 0-10)		Venue: Heartland Credit Union Páirc Seán MacDiarmada

31 January 2026 Round 2	Longford	1-14 (17) – (15) 1-12	Cavan	Longford
14:00		(HT: 0-06 - 1-08)		Venue: Michael Fay Park

31 January 2026 Round 2	Lancashire	2-16 (22) – (26) 1-23	Monaghan	Abbottstown
13:00		(HT: 0-09 - 0-11)		Venue: Abbottstown GAA CoE

==== Round 3 ====
7 February 2026 Round 3	Sligo	4-21 (33) – (15) 1-12	Lancashire	Quigabar
13:00		(HT: 2-08 - 1-08)		Venue: Enniscrone Kilglass GAA

7 February 2026 Round 3	Monaghan	0-13 (13) – (26) 1-23	Longford	Inniskeen
14:00		(HT: 0-03 - 0-12)		Venue: Grattan Park

8 February 2026 Round 3	Warwickshire	2-11 (17) – (35) 2-29	Leitrim	Birmingham
13:00		(HT: 1-04 - 1-16)		Venue: Páirc na hÉireann

==== Round 4 ====
21 February 2026 Round 4	Cavan	2-20 (26) – (21) 2-15	Lancashire	Cavan
13:00		(HT: 2-14 - 0-09)		Venue: Kingspan Breffni Park

21 February 2026 Round 4	Sligo	2-34 (40) – (3) 0-03	Warwickshire	Tubbercurry
13:00		(HT: 0-16 - 0-02)		Venue: Kilcoyne GAA

21 February 2026 Round 4	Monaghan	1-11 (14) – (22) 1-19	Leitrim	Inniskeen
14:00		(HT: 1-05 - 1-13)		Venue: Grattan Park

==== Round 5 ====
28 February 2026 Round 5	Lancashire	0-12 (12) – (27) 3-18	Longford	Abbottstown
13:00		(HT: 0-05 - 1-10)		Venue: Abbottstown GAA CoE

28 February 2026 Round 5	Leitrim	0-20 (20) – (17) 0-17	Cavan	Carrick-on-Shannon
14:00		(HT: 0-10 - 0-07)		Venue: Heartland Credit Union Páirc Seán MacDiarmada

1 March 2026 Round 5	Warwickshire	3-11 (20) – (13) 0-13	Monaghan	Birmingham
13:00		(HT: 1-08 - 0-04)		Venue: Páirc na hÉireann

==== Round 6 ====
7 March 2026 Round 6	Leitrim	2-28 (34) – (15) 0-15	Lancashire	Carrick-on-Shannon
13:00		(HT: 1-16 - 0-06)		Venue: Heartland Credit Union Páirc Seán MacDiarmada

7 March 2026 Round 6	Sligo	8-19 (43) – (12) 0-12	Cavan	Quigabar
14:30		(HT: 5-14 - 0-05)		Venue: Enniscrone Kilglass GAA

7 March 2026 Round 6	Warwickshire	0-16 (16) – (16) 1-13	Longford	Birmingham
14:30		(HT: 0-04 - 1-04)		Venue: Páirc na hÉireann

==== Round 7 ====
21 March 2026 Round 7	Cavan	1-16 (19) – (15) 0-15	Monaghan	Cavan
14:00		(HT: 1-12 - 0-08)		Venue: Kingspan Breffni Park

21 March 2026 Round 7	Lancashire	2-12 (18) – (20) 1-17	Warwickshire	Birmingham
14:00		(HT: 0-07 - 1-05)		Venue: Páirc na hÉireann

21 March 2026 Round 2	Longford	3-11 (20) – (37) 4-25	Sligo	Longford
14:00		(HT: 3-07 - 1-13)		Venue: Glennon Brothers Pearse Park

=== Division 4 Final ===
28 March 2026
14:00 IWT (UTC±0)

Sligo	2-21 (27) – (24 4-12	Longford
(HT: 1-07 - 1-05)

Markievicz Park, Sligo

=== Division 4 Scoring Statistics ===
Overall

Rank	Player	Team	Tally	Total	Matches	Average
1	Robert O'Kelly Lynch	Sligo	3-51	60	8	7.50
2	Andrew Kilcullen	Sligo	7-30	51	4	12.75
3	Mark Moffett	Cavan	4-28	40	7	5.71
4	Seán O'Riordan	Leitrim	0-38	38	7	5.43
5	Reuben Murray	Longford	1-33	36	8	4.50
6	Gerard O'Kelly Lynch	Sligo	8-11	35	8	4.38
7	Niall Arthur	Monaghan	0-35	35	7	5.00
8	Seán Keating	Cavan	2-25	31	7	4.43
9	Daniel Miller	Leitrim	1-27	30	7	4.29
10	Thomas Cawley	Sligo	3-20	29	8	3.63

=== Scoring events ===
- Widest winning margin: 37 points
  - Sligo 2-34 - 0-03 Warwickshire (Division 4 Round 4)
- Most goals in a match: 7
  - Dublin 4-19 - 3-22 Wexford (Division 1B Round 4)
- Most points in a match: 58
  - Limerick 2–27 – 0-31 Galway (Division 1A Round 7)
- Most goals by one team in a match: 6
  - Cork 6-26 - 0-20 Offaly (Division 1A Round 7)
  - Dublin 6-32 - 0-18 Down (Division 1B Round 6)
  - Mayo 0-12 - 6-23 Laois (Division 2 Round 1)
  - Kerry 6-24 - 0-15 Mayo (Division 2 Round 6)
- Most points by one team in a match: 37
  - Mayo 1–14 – 2–37 Westmeath (Division 2 Round 7)
- Highest aggregate score: 68 points
  - Dublin 6-32 - 0-18 Down (Division 1B Round 6)
- Lowest aggregate score: 25 points
  - Louth 0-11 – 0–14 Roscommon (Division 3 Round 4)
