= Simon Roche =

Irish hurler

Personal information
- Native name: Síomón de Róiste (Irish)
- Born: 2005 (age 20–21) Oulart, County Wexford, Ireland
- Occupation: Student

Sport
- Sport: Hurling
- Position: Full-forward
Club
- Years: Club
- 2023–present: Oulart–the Ballagh
Club titles
- Wexford titles: 0
College
- Years: College
- 2024-present: University College Dublin
College titles
- Fitzgibbon titles: 0
Inter-county*
| Years | County | Apps (scores) |
| 2025–present | Wexford | 2 (0-00) |
Inter-county titles
- Leinster titles: 0
- All-Irelands: 0
- NHL: 0
- All Stars: 0
- *Inter County team apps and scores correct as of 21:47, 15 March 2026.

Simon Roche (born 2005) is an Irish hurler. At club level, he plays with Oulart–the Ballagh and at inter-county level with the Wexford senior hurling team.

== Career ==
Roche played hurling at all grades, including the Leinster PPS SAHC, during his time as a student at St Peter's College in Wexford. He later lined out with University College Dublin in the Fitzgibbon Cup. At club level, Roche first played for Oulart–the Ballagh at juvenile and underage levels, and won a Wexford U18 PHC medal in 2023.

At inter-county level with Wexford, Roche spent two years with the minor team and was a Leinster MHC runner-up in 2021. He later progressed to the under-20 team and was captain in his final year in the grade in 2025. He made his senior team debut during the 2025 National Hurling League.

== Career statistics ==
As of 21 March 2026

| Team | Year | National League | | | Munster | | All-Ireland | | Total | |
| Team | Year | Division | Apps | Score | Apps | Score | Apps | Score | Apps | Score |
|---|---|---|---|---|---|---|---|---|---|---|
| Wexford | 2025 | Division 1A | 4 | 0-02 | 2 | 0-00 | — | | 6 | 0-02 |
| Wexford | 2026 | Division 1B | 6 | 1-51 | 0 | 0-00 | 0 | 0-00 | 6 | 1-51 |
| Career total | | | 10 | 1-53 | 2 | 0-00 | 0 | 0-00 | 12 | 1-53 |

== Honours ==
Oulart–the Ballagh

- Wexford Under-18 Premier Hurling Championship: 2023

Sporting positions
| Preceded by Cian Ó Tuama | Wexford under-20 hurling team captain 2025 | Succeeded by Vacant |
