= Connacht GAA Air Dome =

Gaelic football stadium

- University of Galway Connacht GAA Air Dome
- Interactive map of Connacht GAA Air Dome
- Location: Bekan, County Mayo, Ireland
- Coordinates: 53.774024°N 8.854128°W
- Owner: Connacht GAA
- Capacity: 2000+ (GAA games); 10,000-20,000 (concerts/events)

Construction
- Opened: 2021
- Cost: €3.1 million

The University of Galway Connacht GAA Air Dome is an air-supported Gaelic games venue located at the Connacht GAA Centre of Excellence in Bekan, County Mayo, Ireland. It was the second largest facility of its type in the world when it was built.

The Air Dome hosted games at a variety of levels, including senior intercounty matches. Most notably, it was the primary venue for the FBD Insurance League between 2022 and 2024, until the competition was put on hiatus.

It is also capable of holding conferences and concerts.

== History ==
Connacht GAA began developing a Centre of Excellence at the site in 2007 and the site was officially opened in December 2012. In 2018, Connacht GAA was a successful applicant to the Irish Government's Rural Regeneration and Development Fund, and Minister Michael Ring awarded €2.1 million towards the construction of the dome, which began in October 2019. Additional funding for the project, which cost €3.1 million was provided by the GAA Central Council and Connacht GAA.

The Air Dome was officially opened by former GAA President Larry McCarthy in December 2021.

The Air Dome was severely damaged, to the extent of being described as destroyed, in January 2025 by winds from Storm Éowyn. It was repaired and reinflated in June 2026.

== Matches ==
The first inter-county game held at the venue was the opening round fixture of the 2022 FBD League between Leitrim and Sligo on 3 January 2022, which Sligo won by 1–21 to 1–17.
