= Darver Castle =

Fortified house turned hotel in County Louth, Ireland

Coordinates: 53.925851°N 6.4719525°W

Site information
- Website: https://darvercastle.ie

Site history
- Built: 1171

Darver Castle is a fortified tower and manor house located in Readypenny, Dundalk, County Louth, Ireland, dating back to the 12th century. The name "Darver" is derived from the Gaelic word "Dairbhe" meaning "Oakwood."

== History ==
Following the second stage Norman invasion of Ireland in 1171, King Henry II of England granted 500 acres of land to Patrick Babe, on land formerly owned by the church. These were probably awarded for services rendered during the invasion though the circumstances remain unknown. Patrick would go on to erect a fortified tower on the north hill nestled on the edge of the deep slope that led to the banks of two rivers, these rivers serving both defensive and alimentary roles. In the south hill Patrick built a round watchtower to guard the approach. These original buildings on the site of Darver castle would have been wooden (hence the "Darver" name).

The stone tower visible today was added c. 1432. Despite being on the borders of The Pale and preparations for the possibility of a siege being taken, there is no record of any siege being attempted at Darver castle.

In 1740 the Babe family sold Darver Castle to Randal Booth, and Booths descendants lived at Darver until 1980. In 1997 the castle was sold to the Carville family, who have renovated and refurbished it, turning it into a luxury hotel, wedding venue and restaurant.
