= Owenbeg =

Owenbeg An Abhainn Bheag
- Village
- Location in Ireland
- Coordinates: 54°14′01″N 8°56′48″W
- Country: Ireland
- Province: Connacht
- County: County Sligo
- Elevation: 83 m (272 ft)

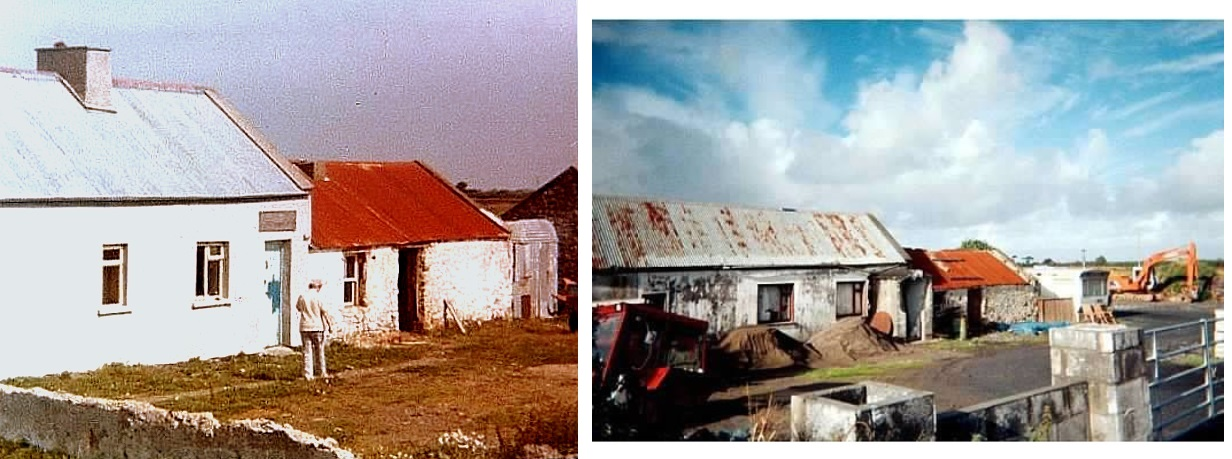
A house in Owenbeg: in 1977 while still occupied and in 2007 after it had been abandoned and was about to be demolished

Owenbeg (Irish: An Abhainn Bheag, meaning 'the little river') is a village and townland in County Sligo, Ireland. It is situated on the N59 national highway section between Ballina, County Mayo, and Sligo Town, near the junction of the road with R297. The name is an anglicisation of the Irish-language words abhainn beag, or "little river", after the river on which it is situated.

The namesake river of the village shares its name with, among others, the Owenbeg Rivers in County Londonderry and County Kerry.

== See also ==
- List of towns and villages in Ireland
- List of townlands of County Sligo
