= 2022–23 All-Ireland Intermediate Club Hurling Championship =

All-Ireland inter-county competition for intermediate clubs

Championship Details
- Dates: 30 October 2022 - 14 January 2023
- Teams: 25

All Ireland Champions
- Winners: Monaleen (1st win)
- Captain: Lorcan Lyons
- Manager: Eoin Brislane

All Ireland Runners-up
- Runners-up: Tooreen
- Captain: Shane Boland
- Manager: Ray Larkin

Provincial Champions
- Munster: Monaleen
- Leinster: Bray Emmets
- Ulster: Liatroim Fontenoys
- Connacht: Tooreen

Championship Statistics
- Matches Played: 24
- Total Goals: 48 (2.00 per game)
- Total Points: 818 (34.08 per game)
- Top Scorer: Christy Moorehouse (0-44)

The 2022–23 All-Ireland Intermediate Club Hurling Championship was the 18th staging of the All-Ireland Intermediate Club Hurling Championship, the Gaelic Athletic Association's intermediate inter-county club hurling tournament. The draws for the respective provincial championships took place at various stages between June and September 2022. The championship ran from 30 October 2022 to 14 January 2023.

The All-Ireland final was played on 14 January 2023 at Croke Park in Dublin, between Monaleen from Limerick and Tooreen from Mayo, in what was their first ever meeting in the final. Monaleen won the match by 1-17 to 1-15 to become the first Limerick club to claim the title.

Christy Moorehouse was the championship's top scorer with 0-44.

== Team Summaries ==
Team	County	Captain(s)	Manager	Most recent success			
Team	County	Captain(s)	Manager	All-Ireland	Provincial	County	#
Abbeyleix St. Lazerian's	Laois	Oisín Carroll	Derek Dunne			2007	
Ballysaggart	Waterford	Chris O'Gorman; Sam Ryan				2019	
Bray Emmets	Wicklow	Marc Lennon	Paul Carley			2021	
Castleblayney Hurling Club	Monaghan	Paddy Finnegan				2021	
Causeway	Kerry	Jason Diggins	Stephen Goggin			2019	
Clooney Gaels	Antrim	Éamonn Brady				2013	
Danesfort	Kilkenny	Des Duane	Niall Bergin			2011	
Eoghan Rua	Derry	Ruairí Mooney	Kieran Lagan			2006	
Eire Óg Carrickmore	Tyrone	Conor McElhatton				2021	
Four Roads	Roscommon	Micheál Kelly	John Cunniffe			2019	
Fr. Dalton's	Westmeath	Pádraig Nestor	Ned O'Connor				
Inniscarra	Cork	Owen McCarthy	Paul McCarthy				
Killimor	Galway	Shane Whelan	Dessie O'Brien			2012	
Liatroim Fontenoys	Down	Pearse Óg McCrickard	Collie Murphy				
Lisbellaw St. Patrick's	Fermanagh				2012	2013	
Middletown na Fianna	Armagh	Cahal Carvill; Ryan Gaffney			2017	2021	
Monaleen	Limerick	Lorcan Lyons	Dermot Gleeson			2016	
Naomh Barróg	Dublin	Nathan Kidd	Paul Carney				
Oulart-the Ballagh	Wexford	Conor O'Leary	Shane O'Brien			1985	
Roscrea	Tipperary	Conor Sheedy; Shane Fletcher	Liam England				
St. Gabriel's	London	Matthew Freaney	Neil Rogers			2018	
St. Joseph's Doora-Barefield	Clare	Tom Hannon	Mike Guilfoyne			2016	
Tooreen	Mayo	Shane Boland	Ray Larkin		2021	2021	
Trim	Meath	James Toher	Jimmy Canty			2020	
Tullamore	Offaly					1989	

== Connacht Intermediate Club Hurling Championship ==
=== Connacht quarter-final ===
30 October 2022 Quarter-final	Four Roads (Roscommon)	0-14 - 2-23	Tooreen (Mayo)	Waldron Park
	C Dolan 0-10 (0-8f), C Mulry 0-1, J Cunniffe 0-1, C Coyle 0-1, M Kelly 0-1f.	Report	S Boland 1-4 (0-3f), S Kenny 0-7 (0-5f), K Feeney 0-5, C Freeman 1-2, F Boland 0-2, J Boyle 0-1, L Lavin 0-1, O Greally 0-1.	Referee: L Gordon (Galway)

=== Connacht semi-final ===
6 November 2022 Semi-final	Tooreen (Mayo)	1-17 - 1-12	St. Gabriel's (London)	Waldron Park
	S Boland (1-2), B Morley (0-3), K Feeney (0-3, 1f), C Freeman (0-2), S Kenny (0-2), E Delaney (0-2), D Harrison (0-1), L Lavin (0-1), C Henry (0-1).	Report	C O’Carroll (1-1), E Kelly (0-4), O Royston (0-2), J Goulding (0-2, 1 sideline), P Mullen (0-1); R Lodge (0-1); N Broderick (0-1f).	Referee: S Hynes (Galway)

=== Connacht final ===
27 November 2022 Final	Killimor (Galway)	1-15 - 0-22	Tooreen (Mayo)	Waldron Park
	K Hanney (1-4), E Horan (0-7), S Treacy (0-1), J Broderick (0-1), R Egan (0-1), A Callaghy (0-1).	Report	S Kenny (0-10), F Boland (0-4); S Boland (0-2), E Delaney (0-2), C Freeman (0-2), D Huane (0-1), L Lavin (0-1).	Referee: S Stack (Roscommon)

== Leinster Intermediate Club Hurling Championship ==
=== Leinster quarter-finals ===
12 November 2022 Quarter-final	Bray Emmets	0-17 - 0-16	Abbeyleix St. Lazerian's	Echelon Park
	C Moorehouse (0-12, 11f), M Boland (0-2), C Lohan (0-1), E McCormack (0-1); R McMahon (0-1).	Report	E Fennelly (0-7, 4f, 1 65); E Rowland (0-3, 3f); S Fitzpatrick (0-2), A Brennan (0-2), C Byrne (0-1), A Dunne (0-1).

12 November 2022 Quarter-final	Danesfort	0-15 - 0-16	Trim	UPMC Nowlan Park
	R Hogan 0-6 four frees; J Mullally 0-1; C Kearney 0-1; B Whitty 0-2; D Dunne 0-2; C Phelan 0-1; P Cooney 0-1; P Murphy 0-1.	Report	J Murray 0-9 seven frees, one '65'; P Ryan 0-2; M Cole 0-2; D Farrell 0-1; I Bermingham 0-1; A Douglas 0-1.	Referee: E Furlong (Wexford)

12 November 2022 Quarter-final	Tullamore	1-17 - 0-10	Fr. Dalton's	Bord na Móna O'Connor Park
	S Dooley (0-11, 0-4 frees, 0-1 '65'), D Fox (1-0), C Martin (0-2), S Kelly, C Egan, G Mann, M Fox (0-1 each).		B Finerty (0-6, all frees), K Martin (0-2), S Maxwell and R McLoughlin (0-1 each).

12 November 2022 Quarter-final	Naomh Barróg	1-25 - 2-22; Penalties: 3-2	Oulart-the Ballagh	Parnell Park
	J Flanagan (0-12, 10 frees), S Doyle (1-1), S Gallagher (0-4); C Costello (0-3), P Doyle (0-2); R McDonald (0-1), C Gallagher (0-1), P Garbutt (0-1).	Report	B Dunne (1-7, 0-7 frees); R Jacob (1-2), G Sinnott (0-4), L Nimmo (0-2), E Moore (0-1 free), S Murphy (0-1); D Buggy (0-1), N Redmond (0-1), D Hayes (0-1); M Óg Storey (0-1), N Kirwan (0-1).	Referee: S Guinane (Offaly)

=== Leinster semi-finals ===
26 November 2022 Semi-final	Bray Emmets	0-14 - 0-07	Naomh Barróg	Echelon Park
	C Moorehouse (0-10, 8 frees, 1 “65”), M Boland (0-3, 1f), E McCormack (0-1).	Report	J Flanagan (0-6, all frees), S Gallagher (0-1).	Referee: G McGrath (Wexford)

26 November 2022 Semi-final	Trim	1-21 - 1-09	Tullamore	Páirc Tailteann
	J Murray 0-10 (five frees; sideline cut, '65'); J Cole 1-1; D Murtagh 0-2; M Cole 0-2; P Ryan 0-2; J Toher 0-1; C Quigley 0-1; D Farrell 0-1; A Douglas 0-1.	Report	S Dooley 1-9 (1-8 frees, one '64').

=== Leinster final ===
10 December 2022 Final	Bray Emmets	0-17 - 0-11	Trim	Bray Emmets Grounds
	C Moorehouse (0-9, 5f), M Boland (0-5), L Maloney (0-2); P Doyle (0-1).	Report	J Murray (0-6, 5f, 1 65), A Douglas (0-2), J Andrews (0-1), P Ryan (0-1); D Murtagh (0-1).	Referee: K Brady (Louth)

== Munster Intermediate Club Hurling Championship ==
=== Munster quarter-finals ===
5 November 2022 Quarter-final	St. Joseph's Doora-Barefield (Clare)	1-23 - 1-16	Causeway (Kerry)	Cusack Park
	D Conroy (0-10, 7f, 1’65); C Ruane (1-4); A O’Neill (0-3, 1f); T Hannan, A Mungovan (0-2 each); D O’Halloran, S Crosbie (0-1 each).	Report	B Barrett (1-7, 1-5f); K Carmody (0-3); Joseph Diggins (0-2); C Harty, G Dooley, E Murphy (sl). D Goggin (0-1 each).	Referee: K Jordan (Tipperary)

6 November 2022 Quarter-final	Roscrea (Tipperary)	4-21 - 0-15	Ballysaggart (Waterford)	FBD Semple Stadium
	C Sheedy(1-6), L Cashin(1-6,2fs), S Conlon(1-2), S Fletcher(1-1), E Fitzpatrick(0-2), A Tynan, D Tynan, D Ryan, J Gilmartin(0-1 each);	Report	Stephen Bennett(0-9,6fs), Shane Bennett, S Mangan(0-2 each), D Meagher, J Roche(0-1 each).	Referee: S Stokes (Cork)

=== Munster semi-finals ===
19 November 2022 Semi-final	Monaleen (Limerick)	2-13 - 0-16	St. Joseph's Doora-Barefield (Clare)	Kilmallock
	M O’Dwyer 1-6 (6f), D Ó Dalaigh 1-2, L Murphy and E Doyle 0-2 each, L Lyons 0-1.	Report	D Conroy 0-6 (4f), T Hannon 0-4, A O’Neill and C Ruane 0-2 each, C Barron and S Crosbie 0-1 each.	Referee: C O'Regan (Cork)

19 November 2022 Semi-final	Roscrea (Tipperary)	1-17 - 3-09	Inniscarra (Cork)	FBD Semple Stadium
	L Cashin 1-8 (0-6f, 0-1 65), A Tynan 0-4, E Fitzpatrick 0-2, C Sheedy, S Conlon, D Ryan (f) 0-1 each.	Report	O McCarthy 0-5 (0-4f), S O’Donoghue 1-1 (1-0f), C Casey, J Roche 1-0 each, J Enright 0-1 (65), F O’Leary 0-1 each.	Referee: N Malone (Clare)

=== Munster final ===
4 December 2022 Final	Roscrea (Tipperary)	0-18 - 1-22	Monaleen (Limerick)	Páirc Uí Rinn
	L Cashin 0-11 (9f); E Fitzpatrick, C Sheedy 0-3 each; S Conlon 0-1.	Report	M O’Dwyer 0-15 (11f); E Doyle 1-1; D Ó Dálaigh 0-2; R Lyons, J Fitzgerald, L McHale, A La Touche Cosgrave 0-1 each.	Referee: C O'Regan

== Ulster Intermediate Club Hurling Championship ==
=== Ulster quarter-finals ===
5 November 2022 Quarter-final	Liatroim Fontenoys	3-22 - 3-15	Castleblayney Hurling Club	Páirc Esler
	P Og McCrickard 1-10 (0-8 fs), C McCrickard 2-5, T Murphy 0-4, S Duggan 0-2, Ruairí McCrickard 0-1 (f).	Report	F Rafter 1-9 (fs), C McHugh 1-1, T Hughes 1-1, E Leonard 0-1, D Crowe 0-1, P Finnegan 0-1, N Garland 0-1.	Referee: J Clarke (Cavan)

5 November 2022 Quarter-final	Eire Óg Carrickmore	2-23 - 2-18 (aet)	Lisbellaw St. Patrick's	Páirc Colmcille
	D Begley 0-9, L Armstrong 0-5, C Munroe 1-1, SP Begley 1-0, A Kelly 0-3, J Kelly 0-2, O Daly 0-1, R Slane 0-1, D Rafferty 0-1.		L McCuskar 0-8, S Corrigan 1-2, C Corrigan 1-1, C Duffy 0-3, JP McGarry 0-2, D Teague 0-2, B Corrigan 0-1.

6 November 2022 Quarter-final	Eoghan Rua	1-13 - 0-19	Middletown na Fianna	Celtic Park
	L Pasmore (0-6,5f), N Holly (1-1), C McGoldrick and D Mooney (0-2) each, SL McGoldrick and L McMllan (0-1) each.	Report	D Gaffney (0-10f), P McBride and B Toal (0-2) each, S Og McGuinnes, K McKernan, O Curry, N Curry and R Gaffney (0-1) each.

=== Ulster semi-finals ===
19 November 2022 Semi-final	Middletown na Fianna	3-19 - 2-20	Eire Óg Carrickmore	Athletic Grounds
	D Gaffney 1-11, R Gaffney 2-0, N Curry 0-2, B Toal 0-2, C Carveill 0-1, S Óg McGuinness 0-1, K McKiernan 0-1, S Gaffney 0-1.		D Begley 0-7, C Munroe 1-1, L Armstrong 0-4, S Óg Grogan 1-0, R Slane 0-3, B McGurk 0-1, A Kelly 0-1, S Sweeney 0-1.

19 November 2022 Semi-final	Liatroim Fontenoys	2-21 - 1-15	Clooney Gaels	Donaghmore Road
	P Og McCrickard (0-6 frees), P Davidson (1-1); C McCrickard (0-4), J McAleenan (1-0), T Murphy (0-3), PJ Davidson (0-2), PJ McComiskey (0-2), S Duggan (0-1), R O’Hare (0-1), R McCrickard (0-1 free).		J O’Connell (1-9, 0-7 free), PJ O’Connell (0-3), D O’Neill (0-1); F O’Neill (0-1), N O’Connell (0-1).

=== Ulster final ===
3 December 2022 Final	Middletown na Fianna	0-20 - 2-20	Liatroim Fontenoys	Corrigan Park
	D Gaffney (0-11, 0-10 frees), N Curry (0-2, 0-1 free), S Gaffney (0-2), R Gaffney (0-2), C Carvill (0-2), B Toal (0-1).	Report	P Og McCrickard (0-11, 0-9 frees), C McCrickard (1-2), PJ Davidson (1-2), S Duggan (0-2), R McCrickard (0-2 frees), T Murphy (0-1).	Referee: K Parke

== All-Ireland Intermediate Club Hurling Championship ==
=== All-Ireland semi-finals ===
18 December 2022 Semi-final	Tooreen (Mayo)	1-18 - 1-14	Liatroim Fontenoys (Down)	Kingspan Breffni Park
	C Freeman (1-2), S Kenny (0-5f), E Delaney (0-4), F Boland (0-4), L Lavin (0-2), S Regan (0-1).	Report	P Óg McCrickard (0-11, 9f); S Duggan (1-0), T Murphy (0-2), C McCrickard (0-1).	Referee: C Mooney (Dublin)

18 December 2022 Semi-final	Monaleen (Limerick)	2-19 - 0-20	Bray Emmets (Wicklow)	Bord na Móna O'Connor Park
	D Ó Dálaigh (0-5, 0-1f); A La Touche Cosgrave 1-1; L Lyons 0-4; D Power 1-0; E Doyle, M O’Dwyer (0-2f) 0-3 each, L Murphy 0-2; L McHale 0-1.	Report	C Moorehouse 0-13 (0-11f); D Masterson, M Boland 0-2 each, P Doyle, M Lennon, B Nesbitt 0-1 each.	Referee: C McDonald (Antrim)

=== All-Ireland final ===
14 January 2023 Final	Tooreen (Mayo)	1-15 - 1-17	Monaleen (Limerick)	Croke Park
	S Boland 0-4 (0-2 frees); L Lavin 1-1, S Regan, F Boland, C Freeman, E Delaney 0-2 each; D Kenny 0-1.	Report	M O’Dwyer 0-7 (0-4 frees); D O Dálaigh 0-5; D Power 1-0; A La Touche Cosgrave 0-2; E Doyle, S Griffin, J Fitzgerald 0-1 each.	Referee: C Cunning (Antrim)

== Championship statistics ==
=== Top scorers ===
Top scorer overall

Rank	Player	Club	Tally	Total	Matches	Average
1	Christy Moorehouse	Bray Emmets	0-44	44	4	11.00
2	Pearse Óg McCrickard	Liatroim Fontenoys	1-38	41	4	10.25
3	Dean Gaffney	Middletown Na Fianna	1-32	35	3	11.66
4	Mark O'Dwyer	Monaleen	1-31	34	4	8.50
5	Luke Cashin	Roscrea	2-25	31	3	10.33
6	James Murray	Trim	0-25	25	3	8.33
7	Seán Kenny	Tooreen	0-24	24	5	4.80
8	Shane Dooley	Tullamore	1-20	23	2	11.50
9	Conor McCrickard	Liatroim Fontenoys	3-12	21	4	5.25
10	Shane Boland	Tooreen	2-12	18	5	3.60
10	Joe Flanagan	Naomh Barróg	0-18	18	2	9.00

In a single game

Rank	Player	Club	Tally	Total	Opposition
1	Mark O'Dwyer	Monaleen	0-15	15	Roscrea
2	Dean Gaffney	Middletown Na Fianna	1-11	14	Eire Óg Carrickmore
3	Pearse Óg McCrickard	Liatroim Fontenoys	1-10	13	Castleblayney Hurling Club
3	Christy Moorehouse	Bray Emmets	0-13	13	Monaleen
6	James O'Connell	Clooney Gaels	1-09	12	Liatroim Fontenoys
6	Shane Dooley	Tullamore	1-09	12	Trim
6	Fergal Rafter	Castleblayney Hurling Club	1-09	12	Liatroim Fontenoys
6	Christy Moorehouse	Bray Emmets	0-12	12	Abbeyleix St. Lazerian's
6	Joe Flanagan	Naomh Barróg	0-12	12	Oulart-the Ballagh
