= 2021–22 All-Ireland Intermediate Club Hurling Championship =

Championship Details
- Dates: 20 November 2021 - 5 February 2022
- Teams: 26

All Ireland Champions
- Winners: Naas (1st win)
- Captain: Brian Byrne
- Manager: Tom Mullally

All Ireland Runners-up
- Runners-up: Kilmoyley
- Captain: Flor McCarthy
- Manager: John Meyler

Provincial Champions
- Munster: Kilmoyley
- Leinster: Naas
- Ulster: Banagher
- Connacht: Tooreen

Championship Statistics
- Matches Played: 26
- Total Goals: 61 (2.34 per game)
- Total Points: 709 (27.26 per game)
- Top Scorer: Daniel Collins (0-41)

The 2021–22 All-Ireland Intermediate Club Hurling Championship was the 17th and current staging of the All-Ireland Intermediate Club Hurling Championship, the Gaelic Athletic Association's intermediate inter-county club hurling tournament. It will be the first club championship to be completed in two years as the 2020-21 series was cancelled due to the COVID-19 pandemic. The championship began on 20 November 2021 and ended on 5 February 2022.

The All-Ireland final was played on 5 February 2022 at Croke Park in Dublin, between Naas from Kildare and Kilmoyley from Kerry, in what was their first ever meeting in a final. Naas won the match by 0-16 to 1-11 to claim their first ever championship title.

Kilmoyley's Daniel Collins was the championship's top scorer with 0-41.

== Team summaries ==
Club	County	#
Athleague	Roscommon	
Ballinakill	Laois	
Cullion	Westmeath	
Bray Emmets	Wicklow	
Carey Faughs	Antrim	
Castleknock	Dublin	
Clodiagh Gaels	Offaly	
Dunhill	Waterford	
Éire Óg Carrickmore	Tyrone	
Glenmore	Kilkenny	
Kildalkey	Meath	
Kilmoyley	Kerry	
Lisbellaw St Patrick's	Fermanagh	
Middletown Na Fianna	Armagh	
Moyne-Templetuohy	Tipperary	
Mungret/St. Paul's	Limerick	
Naas	Kildare	
Naomh Bríd	Carlow	
Oylegate-Glenbrien	Wexford	
Robert Emmetts	London	
Smith O'Brien's	Clare	
Tooreen	Mayo	

== Connacht Intermediate Club Hurling Championship ==
=== Connacht Intermediate Club Hurling Championship ===
==== Quarter-final ====
27 November 2021 Quarter-final	Athleague (Roscommon)	2-07 - 0-28	Tooreen (Mayo)	Dr. Hyde Park
	B McGahon 0-5, R O'Meara 1-0, R Fallon 1-0, A Lyons 0-1, C Kelly 0-1.		S Boland 0-9, F Boland 0-6, E Delaney 0-4, L Lavin 0-3, S Kenny 0-2, C Freeman 0-2, S Regan 0-1, J Cassidy 0-1.

==== Semi-final ====
4 December 2021 Semi-final	Robert Emmetts (London)	1-12 - 1-19	Tooreen (Mayo)	McGovern Park
	K O'Loughlin 0-5, R McGrady 1-0, R Crowley 0-3, C Lordan 0-2, J McCarthy 0-1, A O'Leary 0-1.	Report	E Delaney 1-2, S Kenny 0-5, F Boland 0-4, S Boland 0-4, L Lavin 0-1, C Freeman 0-1, S Coyne 0-1, S Regan 0-1.

==== Final ====
11 December 2021 Final	Moycullen (Galway)	0-14 - 1-15	Tooreen (Mayo)	Waldron Park
	A Whyte 0-9, E Kenny 0-2, N Mannion 0-2, C Cunningham 0-1.	Report	S Boland 0-10, S Regan 1-1, C Freeman 0-3, S Kenny 0-1.

== Leinster Intermediate Club Hurling Championship ==
=== Leinster Intermediate Club Hurling Championship ===
==== First round ====
20 November 2021 First round	Bray Emmets (Wicklow)	0-18 - 0-08	Naomh Bríd (Carlow)	Aughrim County Ground
	C Moorehouse (0-9, 7f), M Boland (0-3), M Lee (0-3), S Lohan (0-2), B McCormack (0-1).	Report	F O’Toole (0-7, 6f), C Byrne (0-1).	Referee: P Dunne (Laois)

20 November 2021 First round	Cullion (Westmeath)	3-11 - 3-12	Ballinakill (Laois)	TEG Cusack Park
	J Galvin 1-5 (one sideline), J Gillen 0-4 (three frees), E Fox and B Stones 1-0 each, R Gillen 0-2	Report	S Fitzpatrick 2-3 (two frees), C O’Shaughnessy 1-0, S Downey (one free), TJ Lalor and E Dwyer 0-2 each, M Kehoe, D Bergin and I Shanahan 0-1 each.	Referee: C Daly (Kildare)

==== Quarter-finals ====
27 November 2021 Quarter-final	Naas (Kildare)	1-21 - 1-06	Castleknock (Dublin)	St. Conleth's Park
	J Sheridan 0-10, S Ryan 1-2, B Byrne 0-3, J Burke 0-2, S Leacy 0-1, K Whelan 0-1, C Tobin 0-1, C Boran 0-1.		C Boyle 1-3, O Ó Flanagáin 0-1, B Hughes 0-1, C Kilkenny 0-1.

27 November 2021 Quarter-final	Ballinakill (Laois)	1-12 - 2-17	Glenmore (Kilkenny)	Fr. Breen Park
	TJ Lalor 0-5 (all frees), C O’Shaughnessy 1-1, S Downey 0-2 (one free), J Drury, L McDonald, N Duggan and I Shanahan 0-1 each.	Report	A Murphy 0-8 (all frees), G Alyward 1-3, D Burke 1-0, B Reid 0-2, P Roche, E Murphy, M Alyward and E Phelan 0-1 each.	Referee: A Kinahan (Offaly)

27 November 2021 Quarter-final	Oylegate-Glenbrien (Wexford)	5-12 - 1-09	Bray Emmets (Wicklow)	Bellefield Park
	S Casey 4-3, J Dunne 1-1, P Doran 0-2, D Reck 0-2, J Reck 0-1, M Kelly 0-1, C Heffernan 0-1, F Hourihane 0-1.		C Moorehouse 0-5, M Lee 0-4, J Henderson 1-0.

4 December 2021 Quarter-final	Clodiagh Gaels (Offaly)	1-14 - 1-13	Kildalkey (Meath)	Bord na Móna O'Connor Park
	D Dunne 0-10, J Keenaghan 1-1, C Langton 0-2, L Langton 0-1.		C Kearney 0-5, N Potterton 1-1, P Potterton 0-3, P Conneely 0-3, J McNally 0-1.

==== Semi-finals ====
11 December 2021 Semi-final	Oylegate-Glenbrien (Wexford)	2-14 - 0-11	Clodiagh Gaels (Offaly)	Bellefield Grounds
	S Casey 1-7, P Doran 1-3, D Reck 0-2, B Dunne 0-1, F Doran 0-1.	Report	L Langton 0-6, D Buckley 0-2, C Langton 0-2, C Brady 0-1.

11 December 2021 Semi-final	Naas (Kildare)	1-16 - 1-10	Glenmore (Kilkenny)	St. Conleth's Park
	B Byrne (0-5, 0-4f, 0-1 65), S Ryan (1-1), J Sheridan (0-3, 0-1f), C Dowling (0-2), K Whelan, S Gainey, R Boran, S Leacy and J Burke (0-1 each)	Report	I Byrne (1-7, 0-7f), S Murphy, L Hennessey and A Murphy (0-1 each)

==== Final ====
16 January 2022 Final	Naas (Kildare)	3-12 - 1-11	Oylegate-Glenbrien (Wexford)	St. Conleth's Park
	J Sheridan 2-4 (2fs), C Dowling 1-2, B Byrne 0-4 (2fs), K Whelan 0-1, S Ryan 0-1.	Report	Seamus Casey 0-5 (5fs), Podge Doran 1-0, Joe Dunne 0-2, Jamie Reck 0-1, Damien Reck 0-1, Jack Reck 0-1; Fergal Doran 0-1.

== Munster Intermediate Club Hurling Championship ==
=== Munster Intermediate Club Hurling Championship ===
==== Quarter-finals ====
27 November 2021 Quarter-final	Smith O'Brien's (Clare)	0-11 - 0-13	Dunhill (Waterford)	Cusack Park
	T Reddan (0-6, 5f), M O’Shea (0-2), J Cusack, M O’Halloran, M Ryan (0-1) each.	Report	S Casey (0-7, 6f, 1 ’65), E Murphy (0-2), C Quinn (0-2), D Murray & B Gallagher (0-1) each.	Referee: K Jordan (Tipperary)

28 November 2021 Quarter-final	Moyne-Templetuohy (Tipperary)	0-14 - 4-12	Kilmoyley (Kerry)	Moyne-Templetuohy GAA Grounds
	G O Connor (0-7, 6f), J Bergin (0-2, 2f), D Fogarty (0-2), P Maher (0-1f); C Bowe (0-1), S Hayes (0-1).	Report	D Collins (0-8, 6f), M O Connor (2-1), A Royle (1-1), D Nolan (1-0), T Murnane (0-1); K McCarthy (0-1).	Referee: N Malone (Cork)

==== Semi-finals ====
11 December 2021 Semi-final	Mungret, St. Paul's (Limerick)	1-17 - 1-18 (aet)	Courcey Rovers (Cork)	TUS Gaelic Grounds
	P O'Brien 0-7 (5 f, 0-1 sl), C Jagana 1-0, N Mulcahy, B Barry 0-3 each, R Duff 0-2, C Hellewell, C O'Brien 0-1 each.	Report	S Twomey 1-2, R Sweetnam 0-4 (0-3 f), J O'Neill 0-3, R Nyhan, S Nyhan (f), J McCarthy, A O'Donovan 0-2 each, T O'Sullivan 0-1.	Referee: J Mullins (Clare)

12 December 2021 Semi-final	Dunhill (Waterford)	2-07 - 1-12	Kilmoyley (Kerry)	Páirc Uí Rinn
	S Casey (1-2, 0-1 65), B Gallagher (1-0), E Murphy (0-3), D Phelan (0-2).		D Collins (0-7, 0-3 frees), M O’Connor (1-3), T Murnane and A Royle (0-1 each).

==== Final ====
9 January 2022 Final	Courcey Rovers (Cork)	0-21 - 0-24 (aet)	Kilmoyley (Kerry)	TUS Gaelic Grounds
	R Sweetnam 0-8f, T O’Sullivan 0-6, J O’Neill, A O’Donovan 0-2 each, S Twomey, R Nyhan, B Ryan 0-1 each.	Report	D Collins 0-10 (0-9f, 0-1 65), M O’Connor 0-4, P O’Connor 0-3, A Royle, J Brick, K McCarthy, T Murnane, R Collins, R Walsh, D McCarthy 0-1 each.	Referee: M Kennedy (Tipperary)

== Ulster Intermediate Club Hurling Championship ==
=== Ulster Intermediate Club Hurling Championship ===
==== Quarter-finals ====
27 November 2021 Quarter-final	Middletown Na Fianna (Armagh)	2-18 - 0-18	Castleblayney Hurling Club (Monaghan)	Athletic Grounds
	R Gaffney 2-3, D Gaffney 0-7, B Toal 0-4, C Carvill 0-2, P McBride 0-1, M Moan 0-1.	Report	F Rafter 0-9, N Garland 0-3, B McGuigan 0-2, D Hughes 0-2, D Crowe 0-1, H Byrne 0-1.

28 November 2021 Quarter-final	Carey Faughs (Antrim)	1-13 - 4-09	Eire Óg Carrickmore (Tyrone)	Páirc Mac Uílín
	C McBride 0-8, J Black 1-1, C McKinley 0-2, J McCouaig 0-1, C McCaughan 0-1.	Report	D Begley 1-2, R Slane 1-1, S Óg Grogan 1-1, C Murray 1-0, J Kelly 0-3, A Crossan 0-1, C Grogan 0-1.

5 December 2021 Quarter-final	Lisbellaw St Patrick's (Fermanagh)	3-15 - 2-08	Newry Shamrocks (Down)	Brewster Park
	J Duffy 1-8, D Teague 1-3, T Keenan 1-1, S Corrigan 0-2, C Duffy 0-1.	Report	E McGuinness 1-2, S McKey 1-0, P Sheehan 0-2, A McGuinness 0-1, R Courtney 0-1, D Young 0-1, J Duggan 0-1.

==== Semi-finals ====
12 December 2021 Semi-final	Eire Óg Carrickmore (Tyrone)	0-10 - 1-17	Lisbellaw St Patrick's (Fermanagh)	St. Tiernach's Park
	D Begley 0-5, O Daly 0-2, J Kelly 0-1, D Grogan 0-1, B McGurk 0-1.		C Corrigan 1-3, S Corrigan 0-6, J Duffy 0-5, T Keenan 0-2, D Teague 0-1.

12 December 2021 Semi-final	Middletown Na Fianna (Armagh)	0-10 - 1-11	Banagher (Derry)	Corrigan Park
	D Gaffney 0-5, N Curry 0-1, D Carvill 0-1, B Toal 0-1, T Nevin 0-1, M Maguire 0-1.	Report	LE Campbell 0-7, P McCloskey 1-0, C Lynch 0-1, J O'Dwyer 0-1, T McCloskey 0-1, C O'Kane 0-1.

==== Final ====
8 January 2022 Final	Lisbellaw St Patrick's (Fermanagh)	0-12 - 2-11	Banagher (Derry)	Healy Park
	D Teague (0-6), C Corrigan (0-2), J Duffy (0-1, 1f), S Corrigan (0-2), C O'Shea (0-1).	Report	C Lynch (1-1), B Og McGilligan (1-0), S McCloskey (0-1), T McCloskey (0-5, 3f), S McCullagh (0-2), LE Campbell (0-2).	Referee: C Cunning (Antrim)

== All-Ireland Intermediate Club Hurling Championship ==
=== All-Ireland Intermediate Club Hurling Championship ===
==== Semi-finals ====
23 January 2022 Semi-final	Tooreen (Mayo)	0-13 - 0-18	Naas (Kildare)	Duggan Park
	S Boland (0-6, 5f ), C Freeman (0-2 ), S Kenny (0-1, 1f ), F Boland (0-1 ), E Delaney (0-1 ), C Henry (0-1 ), J Boyle (0-1 )	Report	J Sheridan (0-9, 6f ), B Byrne (0-3, 3f ), K Aherne (0-2 ), K Whelan (0-1 ), S Ryan (0-1 ), R Kelly (0-1 )	Referee: K ordan (Tipperary)

23 January 2022 Semi-final	Banagher (Derry)	1-12 - 2-15	Kilmoyley (Kerry)	Connacht COE
	S McCloskey (1-2), LE Campbell (0-4f), T McCloskey (0-4, 3f), S Murphy (0-1).	Report	D Collins (0-9, 6f), M O’Connor (2-1), J Brick (0-4), P O’Connor (0-1).

==== Final ====
5 February 2022 Final	Kilmoyley (Kerry)	1-11 - 0-16	Naas (Kildare)	Croke Park
	D Collins (0-7, 5f), D Nolan (1-0), J Brick (0-2), P O’Connor (0-1), M O’Connor (0-1).	Report	J Sheridan (0-4), S Ryan (0-3), B Byrne (0-3), J Burke (0-2), R Boran (0-2), S Leacy (0-2).	Referee: C Mooney (Dublin)

== Championship statistics ==
=== Top scorers ===
Overall

Rank	Player	Club	Tally	Total	Matches	Average
1	Daniel Collins	Kilmoyley	0-41	41	5	8.20
2	Jack Sheridan	Naas	2-30	36	5	7.20
3	Séamus Casey	Oylegate-Glenbrien	5-15	30	3	10.00
4	Shane Boland	Tooreen	0-29	29	4	7.25
5	Mossie O'Connor	Kilmoyley	5-10	25	5	5.00
6	Brian Byrne	Naas	0-18	18	5	3.60
7	John Duffy	Lisbellaw St Patrick's	1-14	17	3	5.66
8	Christy Moorehouse	Bray Emmets	0-14	14	2	7.00
9	Daniel Teague	Lisbellaw St Patrick's	1-10	13	3	4.33
9	Liam Eoin Campbell	Banagher	0-13	13	3	4.33

In a single game

Rank	Player	Club	Tally	Total	Opposition
1	Séamus Casey	Oylegate-Glenbrien	4-03	15	Bray Emmets
2	John Duffy	Lisbellaw St Patrick's	1-08	11	Newry Shamrocks
3	Jack Sheridan	Naas	2-04	10	Oylegate-Glenbrien
3	Séamus Casey	Oylegate-Glenbrien	1-07	10	Clodiagh Gaels
3	Ian Byrne	Glenmore	1-07	10	Naas
3	Shane Boland	Tooreen	0-10	10	Moycullen
3	Jack Sheridan	Naas	0-10	10	Castleknock
3	Dwayne Dunne	Clodiagh Gaels	0-10	10	Kildalkey
3	Daniel Collins	Kilmoyley	0-10	10	Courcey Rovers

== Miscellaneous ==
- Banagher became the first Derry team to win the Ulster title.
- Kilmoyley became the first Kerry team to win the Munster title.
- Naas become the first Kildare team to win the Leinster title since Ardclough in 2006 and Naas also became the first team from Kildare to win a Club All Ireland title.
