= 2014 Ulster Senior Club Football Championship =

2014 Ulster Club Senior Football Championship
Tournament details
- Province: Ulster
- Year: 2014
- Trophy: Seamus McFerran Cup
- Sponsor: Allied Irish Banks
- Date: 19 October - 30 November 2014
- Teams: 9 (one from each of the 9 counties)
- Defending champions: Ballinderry

Winners
- Champions: Slaughtneil (1st win)
- Manager: Mickey Moran
- Captain: Francis McEldowney
- Qualify for: All-Ireland Club SFC

Runners-up
- Runners-up: Omagh
- Manager: Laurence Strain
- Captain: Hugh Gallagher

Other
- Matches played: 8
- Total scored: 9-142
- Top Scorer: Conor McManus (Clontibret) (0-21)
- Website: Ulster GAA

The 2014 Ulster Senior Club Football Championship was the 47th instalment of the annual competition organised by Ulster GAA. It is one of the four provincial competitions of the 2014–15 All-Ireland Senior Club Football Championship.

Derry's Ballinderry Shamrocks were the defending champions, but defeat to Slaughtneil in the county final meant they couldn't defend their title.

Slaughtneil went on to win their first Ulster title, beating Tyrone champions Omagh St Enda's in the final.

== Teams ==
The Ulster championship is contested by the winners of the nine county championships in the Irish province of Ulster. Ulster comprises the six counties of Northern Ireland, as well as Cavan, Donegal and Monaghan in the Republic of Ireland.

County	Team	Last win
Antrim	St Gall's	2009
Armagh	Crossmaglen Rangers	2012
Cavan	Cavan Gaels	
Derry	Slaughtneil	
Donegal	St Eunan's	
Down	Kilcoo	
Fermanagh	Roslea Shamrocks	
Monaghan	Clontibret O'Neills	
Tyrone	Omagh St Enda's	

== Bracket ==
Preliminary round
Kilcoo (Down)	0-11
Clontibret O'Neills (Monaghan)	1-9

Quarter-Finals
St Eunan's (Donegal)	1-9
Roslea Shamrocks (Fermanagh)	0-6
Omagh St Enda's (Tyrone)	2-8
Crossmaglen Rangers (Armagh)	1-9
Slaughtneil (Derry)	0-11
Cavan Gaels (Cavan)	0-9
Clontibret O'Neills (Monaghan)	0-10
St Gall's (Antrim)	0-9

Semi-Finals
St Eunan's (Donegal)	0-8
Omagh St Enda's (Tyrone)	1-8
Slaughtneil (Derry)	1-9
Clontibret O'Neills (Monaghan)	0-7

Final
Omagh St Enda's (Tyrone)	1-9
Slaughtneil (Derry)	1-10

== Preliminary round ==
19 October 2014
15:30 GMT (UTC+0)
Preliminary round

Kilcoo (Down)	0-11 – 1-9	Clontibret (Monaghan)
Darragh O'Hanlon 0-4 (0-3f), Conor Laverty 0-2, Jerome Johnston 0-2, Paul Devlin 0-1 (0-1f), Ryan Johnston 0-1, Donal Kane 0-1	Report	Conor McManus 0-8 (0-8f), Dessie Mone 1-0, Vinny Corey 0-1

Páirc Esler, Newry
Referee: Noel Mooney

== Quarter-finals ==
2 November 2014
14:30 GMT (UTC+0)
Quarter-final

Omagh (Tyrone)	2-8 – 1-9	Crossmaglen Rangers (Armagh)
Ronan O'Neill 1-4 (0-1f), Barry Tierney 1-0, Conan Grugan 0-2 (0-2f), Jason McAnulla 0-1, Connor O'Donnell 0-1	Report	Tony Kernan 0-3 (0-3f), Padraig Stuttard 1-0, Jamie Clarke 0-2 (0-1f), Kyle Brennan 0-2, Martin Aherne 0-1, Johnny Murtagh 0-1

Healy Park, Omagh
Referee: Ciaran Branagan

2 November 2014
14:30 GMT (UTC+0)
Quarter-final

Clontibret (Monaghan)	0-10 – 0-9	St Gall's (Antrim)
Conor McManus 0-7 (0-5f), Brian Greenan 0-1, Vinny Corey 0-1, Aodh Curran 0-1	Report	Michael Pollock 0-4 (0-1f), CJ McGourty 0-2 (0-2f), Jackson McGreevy 0-1, Terry O'Neill 0-1, Aodhan Gallagher 0-1

St Tiernach's Park, Clones
Referee: Sean Hurson

9 November 2014
14:30 GMT (UTC+0)
Quarter-final

St Eunan's (Donegal)	1-9 – 0-6	Roslea Shamrocks (Fermanagh)
Conall Dunne 1-4 (1-0 pen, 0-2f), Kevin Rafferty 0-2, Conor Parke 0-1, Rory Carr 0-1, Conor Gibbons 0-1	Report	Seamus Quigley 0-4 (0-3f), Sean Quigley 0-1 (0-1f), Dermot Reilly 0-1

O'Donnell Park, Letterkenny
Referee: Ronan Barry

9 November 2014
14:30 GMT (UTC+0)
Quarter-final

Slaughtneil (Derry)	0-11 – 0-9	Cavan Gaels (Cavan)
Paul Bradley 0-5 (0-3f), Christopher Bradley 0-3, Ronan Bradley 0-1, Sé McGuigan 0-1, Gerald Bradley 0-1	Report	Seanie Johnston 0-6 (0-5f), Declan Meehan 0-1 (0-1f), Niall Murray 0-1, Paul Graham 0-1

Owenbeg, Dungiven
Referee: Martin McNally

== Semi-finals ==
16 November 2014
14:30 GMT (UTC+0)
Semi-final

St Eunan's (Donegal)	0-8 – 1-8	Omagh (Tyrone)
Cillian Morrison 0-2, Conall Dunne 0-1 (0-1f), Rory Carr 0-1 (0-1f), Conor Morrison 0-1, Rory Kavanagh 0-1, Conor Gibbons 0-1, Sean McVeigh 0-1	Report	Ronan O'Neill 0-3, Conor McMahon 0-3, Barry Tierney 1-0, Jason McAnulla 0-1, Connor O'Donnell 0-1

Celtic Park, Derry
Referee: Noel Mooney

16 November 2014
18:30 GMT (UTC+0)
Semi-final

Slaughtneil (Derry)	1-9 – 0-7	Clontibret (Monaghan)
Paul Bradley 0-6 (0-3f), Christopher Bradley 1-1, Ronan Bradley 0-1, Cormac O'Doherty 0-1	Report	Conor McManus 0-6 (0-5f), Fergal Greenan 0-1

Healy Park, Omagh
Referee: Pádraig Hughes

== Final ==
30 November 2014
15:30 GMT (UTC+0)
Final

Omagh (Tyrone)	1-9 – 1-10	Slaughtneil (Derry)
Barry Tierney 1-1, Ronan O'Neill 0-2 (0-2f), Connor O'Donnell 0-2, Hugh Gallagher 0-1, Cormac O'Neill 0-1, Joe McMahon 0-1, Aaron Grugan 0-1	Report	Cormac O'Doherty 1-2, Christopher Bradley 0-4, Paul Bradley 0-1 (0-1f), Gerald Bradley 0-1, Barry McGuigan 0-1, Ronan Bradley 0-1

Athletic Grounds, Armagh
Attendance: 9,230
Referee: Ciaran Branagan

== Championship statistics ==
=== Top scorers ===
Overall

Rank	Player	Club	Tally	Total	Matches	Average
1	Conor McManus	Scotstown	0-21	21	3	7.00
2	Christopher Bradley	Slaughtneil	2-8	14	3	4.67
3	Ronan O'Neill	Omagh	1-9	12	3	4.00
3	Paul Bradley	Slaughtneil	0-12	12	3	4.00
5	Barry Tierney	Omagh	3-1	10	3	3.33
6	Conall Dunne	St Eunan's	1-5	8	2	4.00
7	Cormac O'Doherty	Slaughtneil	1-3	6	3	2.00
7	Seánie Johnston	Cavan Gaels	0-6	6	1	6.00
9	Darragh O'Hanlon	Slaughtneil	0-4	4	1	4.00
9	Michael Pollock	St Gall's	0-4	4	1	4.00
9	Seamus Quigley	Roslea Shamrocks	0-4	4	1	4.00
9	Connor O'Donnell	Omagh	0-4	4	3	1.33

In a single game

Rank	Player	Club	Tally	Total	Opposition
1	Conor McManus	Clontibret	0-8	8	Kilcoo
2	Ronan O'Neill	Omagh	1-4	7	Crossmaglen Rangers
2	Conall Dunne	St Eunan's	1-4	7	Crossmaglen Rangers
2	Conor McManus	Clontibret	0-7	7	St Gall's
5	Conor McManus	Clontibret	0-6	6	Slaughtneil
5	Seánie Johnston	Cavan Gaels	0-6	6	Slaughtneil
5	Paul Bradley	Slaughtneil	0-6	6	Clontibret
8	Cormac O'Doherty	Slaughtneil	1-2	5	Omagh
8	Paul Bradley	Slaughtneil	0-5	5	Cavan Gaels
10	Barry Tierney	Omagh	1-1	4	Slaughtneil
10	Christopher Bradley	Slaughtneil	1-1	4	Clontibret
10	Christopher Bradley	Slaughtneil	0-4	4	Omagh
10	Darragh O'Hanlon	Kilcoo	0-4	4	Clontibret
10	Michael Pollock	St Gall's	0-4	4	Clontibret
10	Seamus Quigley	Roslea Shamrocks	0-4	4	St Eunan's
