= 2000–01 All-Ireland Senior Club Hurling Championship =

All-Ireland Senior Club Hurling Championship 2000–01
Championship Details
- Dates: 1 October 2000 – 16 April 2001
- Teams: 27

All Ireland Champions
- Winners: Athenry (3rd win)
- Captain: Joe Rabbitte
- Manager: Pat Nally

All Ireland Runners-up
- Runners-up: Graigue-Ballycallan
- Captain: James Young
- Manager: Jim Neary

Provincial Champions
- Munster: Sixmilebridge
- Leinster: Graigue-Ballycallan
- Ulster: Dunloy
- Connacht: Athenry

Championship Statistics
- Matches Played: 30
- Top Scorer: Adrian Ronan (4–27)

The 2000–01 All-Ireland Senior Club Hurling Championship was the 31st staging of the All-Ireland Senior Club Hurling Championship, the Gaelic Athletic Association's premier inter-county club hurling tournament. The championship ran from 1 October 2000 to 16 April 2001.

Athenry of Galway were the defending champions. Fr Murphy's of London, Newtownshandrum of Cork, St Anne's Rathangan of Wexford and University College Dublin made their championship debuts.

The All-Ireland final was played at Croke Park in Dublin on 16 April 2001, between Athenry of Galway and Graigue-Ballycallan of Kilkenny, in what was a first championship meeting between the teams. Athenry won the match by 3–24 to 2–19 and became the third team to win three titles and the second team to win consecutive titles.

Graigue-Ballycallan's Adrian Ronan was the championship's top scorer with 4–27.

== Connacht Senior Club Hurling Championship ==
=== Connacht first round ===
15 October 2000 First round	St Mary's	1–07 – 1–12	Tubbercurry	Páirc Seán Mac Diarmada
	B Beirne 0–5, C Cunniffe 0–1, B Murray 0–1.		P Seevers 1–9, B Walsh 0–1, M Burke 0–1, M Gorman 0–1.

=== Connacht quarter-final ===
21 October 2000 Quarter-final	Tooreen	4–12 – 0–16	Tubbercurry	Ballyhaunis Grounds
	J Cunnane 2–7, D Greally 1–2, S Hunt 0–1, J Henry 0–1, P Hunt 0–1.		P Severs 0–12, R Brennan 0–1, K Killeen 0–1, M Burke 0–1, M Gorman 0–1.

=== Connacht semi-final ===
11 November 2000 Semi-final	Four Roads	0–11 – 1–04	Tooreen	Ballyhaunis Grounds
	T Lennon 0–5, R Mulry 0–2, M Cunniffe 0–1, P Glennon 0–1, J Mannion 0–1, B Mannion 0–1.		F Delaney 1–1, J Cunnane 0–2, P Hunt 0–1.	Referee: J Weldon (Westmeath)

=== Connacht final ===
3 December 2000 Final	Four Roads	1–7 – 2–16	Athenry	Athleague Grounds
	M Cunniffe 0–6, P Glennon 1–0, R Mulry 0–1.	Report	D Moran 0–7, E Cloonan 1–4, D Donoghue 1–1, C Moran, B Higgins, J Rabbitte, D Carroll 0–1 each.	Referee: J Weldon (Westmeath)

== Leinster Senior Club Hurling Championship ==
=== Leinster first round ===
15 October 2000 First round	Slashers Gaels	2–3 – 2–12	St Mullin's	Michael Fay Park
	J Reilly 1–0, C Stakelum 1–0, R Stakelum 0–2, B O'Connor 0–1.		D Doyle 2–1, P Murphy 0–7, C Byrne 0–2, Pat Cody 0–2.

15 October 2000 First round	Castletown	2–10 – 0–11	Coill Dubh	O'Moore Park
	D Cuddy 0–6, E Dooley 1–0, J o'Sullivan 1–0, S O'Hanlon 0–2, M Cuddy 0–1, P Phelan 0–1.		T Carew 0–8, A McAndrew 0–2, C Byrne 0–1.

15 October 2000 First round	Lough Lene Gaels	3–12 – 0–09	Knockbridge	Cusack Park
	J Williams 1–5, D Cunningham 2–0, J Kennedy 0–3, G Briody 0–2, C Williams 0–1, D Carty 0–1.		P Dunne 0–2, C O'Houlihan 0–2, A Hoey 0–2, S Byrne 0–2, T Martin 0–1.

15 October 2000 First round	Carnew Emmets	1–15 – 4–06	Trim	Aughrim County Ground
	Joe Murphy 0–8, JJ Myers 1–2, D Hyland 0–3, E Brennan 0–1, Ted Kennedy 0–1.		Joey O'Toole 3–3, B Murray 1–3.

22 October 2000 First round replay	Trim	0–08 – 1–04	Carnew Emmets	Páirc Tailteann
	J O'Toole 0–5, B Murray, R Fitzsimons, D Murray 0–1 each.	Report	J Murphy 1–3 D Hyland 0–1.	Referee: E Collins (Dublin)

=== Leinster quarter-finals ===
29 October 2000 Quarter-final	Graigue-Ballycallan	5–15 – 0–08	Trim	Nowlan Park
	A Ronan 2–2, E Brennan 1–2, J Hoyne 1–1, James Young 0–4, T Dermody 1–0, E O'Dwyer 0–3, M Hoyne 0–3.	Report	B Murray 0–5, P Gilsenan 0–1, A Smith 0–1, J O'Toole 0–1.	Referee: D Murphy (Wexford)

29 October 2000 Quarter-final	Lough Lene Gaels	1–07 – 2–09	St Anne's Rathangan	St Loman's Park
	G Briody (1–1), P Williams (0–3), G Kennedy (0–2, frees), J Gavigan (0–1).	Report	D O'Connor (1–2), R Doyle (1–2), R Barry (0–5, frees).	Referee: J Guinan (Kilkenny)

29 October 2000 Quarter-final	University College Dublin	2–12 – 1–08	St Mullin's	O'Toole Park
	B Murphy (1–5), P Delaney (1–0), P Fitzgerald (0–3, two frees), J Byrne (0–2), R Moore (0–1), D Gorman (0–1).	Report	S Gahan (1–0), Pat Coady (0–3, 2 frees), D Doyle (0–2), D Kavanagh (0–1), C Byrne (0–1), D Murphy (0–1).	Referee: B Kelly (Westmeath)

4 November 2000 Quarter-final	Castletown	2–10 – 1–08	Birr	O'Moore Park
	P Phelan 1–2, M Butler 1–1, D Cuddy 0–5, F O'Sullivan 0–1, B Ferns 0–1.	Report	Brian Whelehan 1–2, L Power 0–2, G Hannify 0–2, N Claffey 0–1,	Referee: P Aherne (Carlow)

=== Leinster semi-finals ===
11 November 2000 Semi-final	Graigue-Ballycallan	2–12 – 0–7	Castletown	Dr Cullen Park
	T Dermody (1–2), D Byrne (1–1), M Hoyne (0–4), A Ronan (0–3), James Young (0–1), E Brennan (0–1).	Report	D Cuddy (0–5), J Hanlon (0–1), P Phelan (0–1).	Referee: B Kelly (Westmeath)

12 November 2000 Semi-final	St Anne's Rathangan	0–07 – 2–12	University College Dublin	Páirc Uí Shíocháin
	R Barry 0–5, J Berry 0–2, Diarmuid Berry 0–1, F Simpson 1–0.	Report	J Byrne 0–6, P Ormonde, C Everard, R Moore, N Murphy, M Gordon, S O'Neill 0–1 each.	Referee: P Neary (Kilkenny)

=== Leinster final ===
26 November 2000 Final	Graigue-Ballycallan	2–17 – 3–08	University College Dublin	Nowlan Park
	A Ronan 0–5 (3f, 1 65), M Hoyne 0–3, T Comerford, J Young, D Byrne, J Hoyne, T Dermody, E Brennan 0–1 each.	Report	J Byrne 0–5 (4f), B Murphy 1–1, R Moore, P Fitzgerald 0–1 each.

== Munster Senior Club Hurling Championship ==
=== Munster quarter-finals ===
30 October 2000 Quarter-final	Toomevara	0–11 – 0–11	Patrickswell	Semple Stadium
	K Dunne 0–6 (5f), J O'Brien 0–2, P O'Brien, P Hackett, T Carroll 0–1.	Report	G Kirby 0–5 (4f, '65), P O'Grady, A Carmody 0–2 each, T O'Brien, B Foley 0–1.	Referee: G Harrington (Cork)

12 November 2000 Quarter-final	Mount Sion	3–14 – 0–12	Ballyduff	Walsh Park
	E Kelly 2–4, T Browne 0–5, B Browne 1–0, M O’Regan 0–2, P Fanning 0–1, E McGrath 0–1, K McGrath 0–1.		B O’Sullivan 0–6, A Boyle 0–2, P Rourke 0–2, G O’Brien 0–1, K Boyle 0–1.

12 November 2000 Quarter-final replay	Patrickswell	1–13 – 1–11	Toomevara	Gaelic Grounds
	G Kirby 1–8 (0–8 frees), P O'Grady 0–3, D Foley and D O'Grady 0–1 each.	Report	P O'Brien 0–6 (all frees), J O'Brien 1–2, M Bevans, K Dunne and Tommy Dunne 0–1 each.	Referee: P Moore (Waterford)

=== Munster semi-finals ===
23 October 2000 Semi-final	Mount Sion	3–07 – 2–09	Newtownshandrum	Walsh Park
	T Browne (1–5, points from frees), E Kelly (1–1, point from free), K McGrath (1–0, free), E McGrath (0–1).	Report	B O'Connor (1–5, 4 frees), I Kelleher (1–0), J O'Connor (0–3), M Morrissey (0–1).	Referee: S Roche (Tipperary)

19 November 2000 Semi-final	Patrickswell	0–12 – 0–13	Sixmilebridge	Gaelic Grounds
	G Kirby 0–6 (4f), P O'Grady 0–2, P O'Reilly, T O'Brien, E Foley, B Foley 0–1 each.	Report	J Reddan 0–5, N Gilligan 0–3 (1f), M Conlon, B Culbert, S Fitzpatrick, J Chaplin, J O'Meara 0–1 each.	Referee: W Barrett (Tipperary)

=== Munster final ===
26 November 2000 Final	Sixmilebridge	2–17 – 3–08	Mount Sion	Semple Stadium
	N Gilligan 1–8 (3f, 3 '65s'), B Colbert 1–4, C Chaplin, J Reddan 0–2 each, A Mulready 0–1.	Report	K McGrath 2–3 (2-1f), E Kelly 1–1, M White, J O'Meara, T Browne (f), B Browne 0–1 each.	Referee: J Gribbin (Down)

== Ulster Senior Club Hurling Championship ==
=== Ulster semi-finals ===
1 October 2000 Semi-final	Dunloy	4–11 – 1–10	Portaferry	Casement Park
	Greg O'Kane 1–3, P Richmond 1–1, A Elliott 1–1, D McMullan 1–0, L Richmond 0–3, C McGrath 0–2, E McKee 0–1.		P Branniff 0–5, P Mallon 1–0, G McGrattan 0–2, B Milligan 0–1, B Branniff 0–1, R McGrattan 0–1.

15 October 2000 Semi-final	Eoghan Ruadh, Dungannon	2–04 – 3–13	Slaughtneil	O'Neill Park
	B McIntosh 1–1, M Devlin 1–0, E Devlin 0–2, P Lavery 0–1.		M Cassidy 1–3, A Quigg 1–1, D Doherty 0–4, D McMullan 1–0, Fergal McEldowney 0–3, P McKeague 0–2.

=== Ulster final ===
22 October 2000 Final	Dunloy	2–17 – 3–08	Slaughtneil	Casement Park
	S McMullan 1–3, G O'Kane 0–4, L Richmond 1–1, C McGrath and P Richmond 1–0 each, C McGuckian and C Cunning 0–2 each, E McKee and J Elliott 0–1 each.	Report	D Doherty 0–5, A Quigg, F McEldowney, D Cassidy, J Kelly 0–1 each.	Referee: G Devlin (Armagh)

== All-Ireland Senior Club Hurling Championship ==
=== All-Ireland quarter-final ===
3 December 2000 Quarter-final	Sixmilebridge	2–11 – 0–06	Fr Murphy's	Emerald GAA Grounds
	B Culbert 1–3, N Gilligan 0–5 (4f), J Reddan 1–1, M Conlan, J O'Meara 0–1 each.	Report	I Rocks 0–4 (4f), D Howlin, E Roche 0–1 each.	Referee: J Gribbin (Down)

=== All-Ireland semi-finals ===
25 February 2001 Semi-final	Athenry	3–20 – 1–10	Dunloy	Parnell Park
	E Cloonan 1–11 (7f), D Donohue 1–2, C Moran 1–1, P Higgins 0–2, J Rabbitte 0–1, B Keogh 0–1, B Hanley 0–1, D Burns 0–1.	report	S McMullan 1–0, G Kane 0–3 (2f), A Elliott 0–2, C Cunning 0–2, L Redmond 0–1, C McGuckian 0–1, D McMullan 0–1 ('65).	Referee: B Kelly (Westmeath)

25 February 2001 Semi-final	Graigue-Ballycallan	1–16 – 2–13	Sixmilebridge	Semple Stadium
	A Ronan 1–5, E Brennan, T Dermody, M Hoyne 0–3 each, E O'Dwyer, D Byrne 0–1 each.	Report	N Gilligan 1–7 (7f), B Culbert 1–2, C Chaplin, J Reddan 0–2 each.	Referee: P O'Connor (Limerick)

31 March 2001 Semi-final replay	Graigue-Ballycallan	1–13 – 1–12	Sixmilebridge	Semple Stadium
	E Brennan (1–0), M Hoyne (0–3), A Ronan (0–3, all frees), D Byrne (0–3), T Dermody (0–2), J Young (0–1), J Hoyne (0–1).	Report	N Gilligan (0–7, all frees), B Culbert (1–0), D Fitzgerald (0–2), M Conlon (0–2), J Chaplin (0–1).

=== All-Ireland final ===
16 April 2001 Final	Athenry	3–24 – 2–19 (aet)	Graigue-Ballycallan	Croke Park
	E Cloonan 1–11 (8f, 2 '70's), D Donohue 1–3, J Rabbitte 1–1, D Moran 0–4, D Burns 0–2, P Higgins, B Higgins, D Higgins (f) 0–1 each.	Report	A Ronan 1–9 (6f), James Young 1–0, E Brennan 0–4, M Hoyne, J Hoyne 0–2 each, E O'Dwyer, D Hoyne 0–1.	Referee: J McDonnell (Tipperary)

== Championship statistics ==
=== Top scorers ===
Rank	Player	County	Tally	Total	Matches	Average
1	Adrian Ronan	Graigue-Ballycallan	4–27	39	6	6.50
2	Niall Gilligan	Sixmilebridge	2–30	36	5	7.20
3	Eugene Cloonan	Athenry	3–26	35	3	11.66
4	Paul Seevers	Tubbercurry	1–21	24	2	12.00
5	Brian Culbert	Sixmilebridge	4–10	22	5	4.40
5	Gary Kirby	Patrickswell	1–19	22	3	7.33
7	Eoin Kelly	Mount Sion	4–06	18	3	6.00
7	Joey O'Toole	Trim	3-09	18	3	6.00
7	Micheál Hoyne	Graigue-Ballycallan	0–18	18	6	3.00
10	Eddie Brennan	Graigue-Ballycallan	2–11	17	6	2.83
