= Mayo county hurling team =

Hurling team

Mayo
- Sport: Hurling
- Irish: Maigh Eo
- Nickname(s): The Westerners; The Yew County; The Heather County
- County board: Mayo GAA
- Manager: Ray Larkin
- Home venue(s): Castlebar

Recent competitive record
- Last championship title: None
- Current NHL Division: 3 (2nd in 2025; promoted to Division 2)
- Last league title: None
First colours	Second colours

The Mayo county hurling team represents Mayo in hurling and is governed by Mayo GAA, the county board of the Gaelic Athletic Association. The team competes in the Christy Ring Cup and the National Hurling League. It formerly competed in the abolished Connacht Senior Hurling Championship.

Mayo's home ground is MacHale Park, Castlebar. The team's manager is Ray Larkin.

The team last won the Connacht Senior Championship in 1909, but has never won the All-Ireland Senior Championship or the National League.

== History ==
Although not a traditional hurling county, hurling is strong in certain parts of the county especially in the eastern region around Ballyhaunis and Tooreen. Mayo has four senior hurling clubs, each of which provides players for the Mayo senior hurling panel, which participates in the National Hurling League and the All-Ireland Nicky Rackard (Tier 3) Cup.

Mayo has 10 clubs that provide players for the Mayo underage hurling development panels. Mayo has development panels at under-14, under-15, under-16 and minor age-groups, and competes in the All-Ireland 'B' competitions each year.

The Mayo under-21 hurling team competes in the Connacht U-21B Hurling Championship each year alongside Leitrim, Roscommon and Sligo.

Mayo's best performances in the Christy Ring Cup came in 2008 and 2009, when the Mayo side fell at the semi-final stage to Carlow and Down respectively.

Mayo won the 2016 Nicky Rackard Cup, defeating Armagh by a scoreline of 2–16 to 1–15 at Croke Park.

Mayo lost the 2020 Nicky Rackard Cup Final to Donegal by a scoreline of 3–18 to 0–21.

== Panel ==
Team as per Mayo vs Roscommon in the Nickey Rackard Cup Final, 9 July 2025

No.	Player	Position	Club
1	Bobby Douglas	Goalkeeper	Tooreen
2	Conal Hession	Right corner back	Tooreen
3	Oisin Greally	Full back	Tooreen
4	Conor Murray	Left corner back	Castlebar Mitchels
5	Eoghan Collins	Right half back	Ballyhaunis
6	Kieran McDermott	Centre back	Ballyhaunis
7	David Kenny	Left half back	Tooreen
8	Danny Huane	Midfield	Tooreen
9	Sioman Thomas	Midfield	Castlegar
10	Liam Lavin	Right half forward	Tooreen
11	Cormac Phillips	Centre forward	Ballyhaunis
12	Ryan Duffy	Left half forward	Ballyhaunis
13	Shane Boland (c)	Right corner forward	Tooreen
14	Eoin Delaney	Full forward	Tooreen
15	Joe Burke	Left corner forward	Moytura

No.	Player	Position	Club
16	Kevin Duffy	Substitute	Ballina Stephenites
17	Mark Phillips	Substitute	Ballyhaunis
18	Luke Connor	Substitute	Caiseal Gaels
19	Jack Trench	Substitute	Tooreen
20	Eoin Ryan	Substitute	Ballyhaunis
21	Matthew Connor	Substitute	Caiseal Gaels
22	John Heraty	Substitute	Moytura
23	Jason Coyne	Substitute	Ballyhaunis
24	Sean Kenny	Substitute	Tooreen
25	Michael Farrell	Substitute	Ballyhaunis
26	Corey Schaill	Substitute	Castlebar Mitchels

^{INJ} Player has had an injury which has affected recent involvement with the county team.
^{RET} Player has since retired from the county team.
^{WD} Player has since withdrawn from the county team due to a non-injury issue.

== Management team ==
Appointed 4 September 2024:

- Manager: Ray Larkin (Tooreen)
- Head coach: Nigel Shaughnessy (former Galway senior hurler, Loughrea)
- Backroom: Pádraig Mannion

== Managerial history ==
Mark Deeley 1997–2001

Gerry Kilbride 2001

Mattie Murphy Galway 2001–2002

Gerry Spellman or Spelman Galway 2003–2005

Frank Browne Wexford/Ballyhaunis 2005–2006

Martin Brennan Westport 2006–2011

Murt Connolly Galway 2011–2012

Christy Phillips Limerick 2013–2014

J P. Coen 2015–2017

Derek Walsh Ballyhaunis 2018–2022

Dave McConn & Tom Phillips 2022–23

Ray Larkin & Brian Finn 2023–24

Ray Larkin 2024–

Walsh was appointed in 2018, ratified for a fourth year in charge ahead of the 2021 season then resigned at the end of the 2022 season.

== Players ==
=== Captaincy ===
- 2022: Shane Boland

=== Awards ===
- Champion 15:

denotes that a player also won Player of the Year for the year in question.

2005: Keith Higgins
2006: Paddy Barrett
2009: Conor Ryan, Adrian Freeman
2010: Derek McConn
2011: Shane Morley
2012: Donal O'Brien
2013: Derek McDonnell
2014: Ciaran Charlton, David Kenny
2017: Ger McManus
2018: David Kenny^{2nd}
2020: Cathal Freeman, Shane Boland
2021: David Kenny^{3rd}, Cathal Freeman^{2nd}, Keith Higgins ^{2nd}
2022: Keith Higgins^{3rd}
2024: David Kenny^{4th}, Shane Boland^{2nd}
2025: Oisín Greally, Daniel Huane, Liam Lavin

=== Records ===
- Joe Henry (Tooreen) won Railway Cup medals with Connacht in the 1980s
- Keith Higgins (Ballyhaunis), the dual player, played for the county football team in many's an All-Ireland Senior Football Championship final from 2006 onwards
- Shane Boland, 2022 captain, finished as top scorer in the 2022 Christy Ring Cup
- Shane Crinnigan (Tooreen) won four Connacht medals for that club (2017, 2019, 2021, 2022).

== Honours ==
=== National ===
- All-Ireland Senior Hurling Championship
  - (bronze) Semi-finalists (1): 1909
- All-Ireland Senior B Hurling Championship / Joe McDonagh Cup (Tier 2)
  - (silver) Runners-up (1): 2004
- All-Ireland Intermediate Hurling Championship / Christy Ring Cup (Tier 3)
  - (silver) Runners-up (1): 2022
  - (bronze) Semi-finalists (3): 2008, 2009, 2014
- All-Ireland Junior Hurling Championship / Nicky Rackard Cup (Tier 4)
  - (gold) Winners (5): 1980, 1981, 2003, 2016, 2021
  - (silver) Runners-up (3): 1976, 1978, 2020
- All-Ireland Minor C Hurling Championship
  - (gold) Winners (2): 2013, 2014
- National Hurling League Division 2B
  - (gold) Winners (1): 2018
- National Hurling League Division 3
  - (gold) Winners (7): 1966, 1980, 1986, 1988, 2003, 2005, 2024
- National Hurling League Division 4
  - (gold) Winners (2): 1991, 2002

=== Provincial ===
- Connacht Senior Hurling Championship
  - (gold) Winners (1): 1909
  - (silver) Runners-up (1): 1905
- Connacht Intermediate Hurling Championship
  - (gold) Winners (2): 1969, 2014
  - (silver) Runners-up (2): 1968, 2013
- Connacht Junior Hurling Championship
  - (gold) Winners (3): 1936, 1967, 2004
  - (silver) Runners-up (10): 1934, 1935, 1939, 1950, 1959, 1960, 1964, 1965, 1972, 1975
- Jim Hogan Couriers Connacht U21 Hurling Championship
  - (gold) Winners (2): 2015, 2016
- Connacht Minor Hurling Championship
  - (gold) Winners (1): 1964
  - (silver) Runners-up (2): 1935, 1952
