= Justin McMahon =

Irish Gaelic footballer (born 1986)

Personal information
- Nickname: Justy
- Born: 1986 (age 39–40) Omagh, County Tyrone
- Occupation: Student
- Height: 1.91 m (6 ft 3 in)

Sport
- Sport: Gaelic football
- Position: Full Back
Club
- Years: Club
- Omagh St Enda's
Inter-county
Years	County	Apps (scores)
2007-	Tyrone	6 (2)
Inter-county titles
- Ulster titles: 3
- All-Irelands: 1
- NFL: 0
- All Stars: 1

Justin McMahon is an Irish Gaelic footballer who played for the Omagh St Enda's club and for the Tyrone county team.

He is the younger brother of Joe McMahon.

== Playing career ==
Justin McMahon is an All-Ireland Senior Football Championship winner. In 2006, he captained the Tyrone under-21 team in their Ulster Championship-winning campaign, and graduated to the senior squad, joining his older brother, Joe.

He made his senior debut for Tyrone in the National Football League second round against Fermanagh. He scored a point in his debut. He played Full Back for the Tyrone All Ireland winning team in 2008, and managed to mark Kerry's Kieran Donaghy out of the game, rendering him scoreless.

He is also part of the Omagh St Enda's senior team, playing as a forward, and his efforts in 2006 have been rewarded with a nomination for the Tyrone All Stars, one of two Omagh men to meet that standard.

In early 2007, Justin was nominated as the Ulster Herald Sports Personality of the Year for 2006, having been the newspaper's Sports Personality of March, when he had captained Tyrone's U-21 Ulster Championship success.

He played in the MacRory Cup for Omagh CBS in 2004, and captained the team to the semi-final, and while at university, he played for St Mary's in the 2007 Dr McKenna Cup.
