= Pearse Óg McCrickard =

Northern Irish hurler

Personal information
- Native name: Piaras Mac Riocaird (Irish)
- Born: 1996 (age 29–30) Leitrim, County Down, Northern Ireland
- Occupation: Primary school teacher

Sport
- Sport: Hurling
- Position: Full-forward
Club
- Years: Club
- Liatroim Fontenoys
Club titles
	Football	Hurling
Down titles	0	0
College
- Years: College
- St Mary's University College
College titles
- Fitzgibbon titles: 0
Inter-county
- Years: County
- 2018-present: Down
Inter-county titles
- Ulster titles: 0
- All-Irelands: 0
- NHL: 0
- All Stars: 0

Pearse Óg McCrickard (born 1996) is an Irish hurler. At club level he is a dual player with Liatroim Fontenoys and is also a member of the Down senior hurling team.

== Career ==
McCrickard first played hurling as a student at St Colman's College in Newry. He played on the Ulster combined colleges’ hurling team, as well as claiming Ulster Colleges' All-Stars. McCrickard also played hurling during his time at St Mary's University College in Belfast, and was part of the Fergal Maher Cup-winning team in 2018.

At club level, McCrickard first played for Liatroim Fontenoys in the various juvenile and underage grades, before later joining the club's adult teams as a dual player. He captained the team to a Down IHC title in 2022, before later claiming the Ulster Club IHC title. McCrickard won a Down IFC title in 2023.

McCrickard was a dual player at inter-county level with Down from under-14 up to under-21 level. He made his Down senior hurling team debut in 2018. McCrickard was a back-to-back Christy Ring Cup runner-up in 2019 and 2020, however, in spite of those defeats he won a National Hurling League Division 2B medal in 2020. He was named on the Joe McDonagh Cup Team of the Year in 2023, having earlier been called up to the Down senior football team for a trial game.

== Honours ==
=== Team ===
Liatroim Fontenoys

- Ulster Intermediate Club Hurling Championship: 2022
- Down Intermediate Football Championship: 2023
- Down Intermediate Hurling Championship: 2022

Down

- National Hurling League Division 2B: 2020

=== Individual ===
Awards

- Joe McDonagh Cup Team of the Year: 2023
