= 2001 All-Ireland Senior Club Hurling Championship final =

2001 All-Ireland Senior Club Hurling Championship Final
- Event: 2000–01 All-Ireland Senior Club Hurling Championship
Athenry	Graigue-Ballycallan
3-24	2-19
- Date: 16 April 2001
- Venue: Croke Park, Dublin
- Referee: J McDonnell (Tipperary)
- Attendance: 20,025

The 2001 All-Ireland Senior Club Hurling Championship final was a hurling match played at Croke Park on 16 April 2001 to determine the winners of the 2000–01 All-Ireland Senior Club Hurling Championship, the 31st season of the All-Ireland Senior Club Hurling Championship, a tournament organised by the Gaelic Athletic Association for the champion clubs of the four provinces of Ireland. The final was contested by Athenry of Galway and Graigue-Ballycallan of Kilkenny, with Athenry winning by 3–24 to 2-19 after extra time.

The All-Ireland final was a unique occasion as it was the first ever championship meeting between Athenry and Graigue-Ballycallan. It remains their only clash in the All-Ireland series. Athenry were hoping to become only the second team ever to retain the title while Graigue-Ballycallan were hoping to win the All-Ireland title for the first time.

The first half proved a dull affair with neither side settling into their game. A string of frees from Athenry full forward Eugene Cloonan propelled the Westerners into an early lead. But the Kilkenny champions remained in contention, due largely to the sharp shooting of corner forward Adrian Ronan. The wides tally was 7–1 to Athenry at half-time, by which time they held a two-point lead, 0–8 to 0–6.

Athenry stretched their advantage early in the second half with fine points from Cloonan, Donal Moran and captain Joe Rabbitte. Athenry led by 0–12 to 0-7 after 40 minutes, but Graigue dug in and with Adrian Ronan beginning to exploit widening gaps, they bagged an equalizing goal in the 45th minute. Graigue-Ballycallan outscored Athenry by 1–8 to 0–2 in the final 17 minutes of normal time and looked to be on their way. David Donohue cut the gap to a goal, however, it still looked altogether desperate for the defending champions. Athenry launched one final attack and this time Cloonan found a few inches of space to wriggle through and squeeze home the equalising goal to send the game into extra-time.

The first 15-minute period of extra time saw Athenry begin to dominate. Points from Cloonan, Brian Higgins and David Donohoe opened up a three-point lead. Graigue's title ambitions were dealt a crushing blow when Joe Rabbitte latched onto Cloonan's long searching ball to drill home Athenry's second goal. Despite James Young's late goal in the second period of extra time, Graigue-Ballycallan still had a five-point deficit to overcome. A late David Donohoe goal for Athenry killed off the contest.

Athenry's victory secured their third All-Ireland title in five years. They joined Blackrock and Ballyhale Shamrocks in joint first position on the all-time roll of honour.

== Match ==
=== Details ===
16 April 2001

Athenry	3-24 - 2-19	Graigue-Ballycallan
E Cloonan 1-11 (8f, 2 '70's), D Donohue 1-3, J Rabbitte 1-1, D Moran 0-4, D Burns 0-2, P Higgins, B Higgins, D Higgins (f) 0-1 each.		A Ronan 1-9 (6f), James Young 1-0, E Brennan 0-4, M Hoyne, J Hoyne 0-2 each, E O'Dwyer, D Hoyne 0-1.

Croke Park, Dublin
Attendance: 20,025
Referee: J McDonnell (Tipperary)

Athenry	Graigue-Ballycallan
