= Eoghan Ruadh, Dungannon GAA =

Tyrone-based Gaelic games club

Eoghan Ruadh, Dungannon
- Eoghan Ruadh, Dún Geanainn
- Founded: 1944
- County: Tyrone
- Colours: Red and white
- Grounds: Donaghmore Road
- Coordinates: 54°30′32″N 6°46′41″W

Playing kits
Standard colours

Senior Club Championships
	All Ireland	Ulster champions	Tyrone champions
Hurling:	0	0	24

Eoghan Ruadh, Dungannon GAA is a Gaelic Athletic Association club located in Dungannon, County Tyrone, Northern Ireland. The club is solely concerned with the game of hurling.

== History ==
The Eoghan Ruadh club was founded in Dungannon in 1944 and is named for Owen Roe O'Neill (c. 1585–1649). Since then, the club has won several titles in the Tyrone Senior Hurling Championship, and lies second only to Eire Óg Carrickmore on the all-time roll of honour with 24 titles. For most of that time the club had no permanent base and played their matches at O'Neill Park, the home of Dungannon Clarke's GFC, and other neighbouring grounds. In 2015, the club opened their own complex at Donaghmore Road. Further improvements to the club's facilities were undertaken in subsequent years.

== Honours ==
- Tyrone Senior Hurling Championship (24): 1948, 1951, 1952, 1955, 1956, 1957, 1966, 1969, 1975, 1978, 1990, 1992, 1993, 1996, 1997, 1999, 2000, 2001, 2005, 2009, 2012, 2013, 2018, 2019

== Notable players ==
- Damian Casey
