= Shane Boland =

Irish hurler

Personal information
- Native name: Seán Ó Beolláin (Irish)
- Born: 1994 (age 31–32) Tooreen, County Mayo, Ireland

Sport
- Sport: Hurling
- Position: Left corner-forward
Club
- Years: Club
- Tooreen
Club titles
- Mayo titles: 8
Inter-county
- Years: County
- 2014–present: Mayo
Inter-county titles
- NHL: 2

Shane Boland (born 1994) is an Irish hurler. At club level, he plays with Tooreen while at inter-county level he lines out with the Mayo senior hurling team.

== Career ==
Boland plays his club hurling with the Tooreen club. After winning a Mayo JHC title with the club in 2013, he went on to win eight Mayo SHC medals between 2013 and 2024. Boland also won five Connacht Club IHC medals during this period, while he was also part of the Tooreen team beaten by Monaleen in the 2023 All-Ireland IHC club final.

Boland made his Mayo senior hurling team debut in 2014. He had his first success two years later when Mayo won the Nicky Rackard Cup club after a 2-16 to 1-15 defeat of Armagh in the final. Boland claimed a National League Division 2B title two years later before adding a second Rackard Cup medal to his collection in 2021. After moving up a grade, he captained the team when they were beaten by Kildare in the 2022 Christy Ring Cup final. Boland won a National League Division 3A medal in 2024.

== Personal life ==
His brother, Fergal Boland, has also played for Mayo as a dual player.

== Honours ==
Tooreen

- Connacht Intermediate Club Hurling Championship: 2017, 2019, 2021, 2022, 2023
- Mayo Senior Hurling Championship: 2013, 2017, 2018, 2019, 2021, 2022, 2023, 2024
- Mayo Junior Hurling Championship: 2013

Mayo

- Nicky Rackard Cup: 2016, 2021
- National Hurling League Division 2B: 2018
- National Hurling League Division 3A: 2024

Sporting positions
| Preceded by Keith Higgins | Mayo senior hurling team captain 2022 | Succeeded by David Kenny |
