= Joe McMahon =

Irish Gaelic footballer (born 1983)

Personal information
- Born: 3 August 1983 (age 43) Omagh, County Tyrone, Northern Ireland
- Height: 1.92 m (6 ft 4 in)

Sport
- Sport: Gaelic football
- Position: Full Back/Full Forward
Club
- Years: Club
- 2001–: Omagh St Enda's
Inter-county
- Years: County
- 2004–2017: Tyrone
Inter-county titles
- Ulster titles: 3
- All-Irelands: 2

Joe McMahon is an Irish Gaelic football coach and former player. McMahon played for the Omagh St Enda's club and the Tyrone county team.

== Early life ==
McMahon was part of the Omagh CBS MacRory Cup team that shared the title in 2001 (the scheduled replay was abandoned, due to restrictions of crowd gatherings amid a foot-and-mouth disease outbreak), and reached the final in 2002.

His younger brother, Justin, was captain of the Tyrone team that won the 2006 Ulster Under-21 Football Championship.

== Playing career ==
A two-time All-Ireland SFC-winner, McMahon started the 2005 All-Ireland SFC final; though he had to be replaced because of injury, he became the first Omagh man to win an All-Ireland SFC title. He also started the 2008 All-Ireland SFC final at number 12, but played most of the game alongside his brother in the back line, helping to hold Kerry's "Twin Towers" of Donaghy and Walsh to 1 point.

2008 was a career-defining year for McMahon, as he was switched between the forwards and backs on the Tyrone side throughout most of the season. In the quarter-final, while being one of a number of Tyrone players sporting a beard for the occasion, he scored a crucial goal against Dublin.

In October 2005, barely a month after his All-Ireland SFC win, McMahon was part of the Omagh St Enda's team that reached the Tyrone Championship final.

== Post-playing ==
In 2018, McMahon joined the TTM Radio commentary team as match analyst.

McMahon was a coach of the Tyrone team that won the 2021 Ulster SFC and 2021 All-Ireland SFC titles. He joined the backroom management team of Robbie Brennan at Meath in 2024, but left in March 2025.
