= Murt Connolly =

Irish hurler

Personal information
- Native name: Máirtín Ó Conghaile (Irish)
- Born: Castlegar, County Galway, Ireland

Sport
- Sport: Hurling
- Position: Midfield
Club
- Years: Club
- Castlegar
Club titles
- Galway titles: 2
- Connacht titles: 2
- All-Ireland Titles: 1

Murt Connolly is an Irish former hurler who played as a midfielder for the Castlegar senior team.

Born in Castlegar, County Galway, Connolly first played competitive hurling whilst at school in St Mary's College, Galway. At club level he is a one-time All-Ireland medallist with Castlegar. In addition to this he also won two Connacht medals and two championship medals.

As the youngest of the Connolly dynasty, many of his brothers, John, Pádraic, Joe, Michael, Tom and Gerry, played with distinction for Castlegar and Galway.

In retirement from playing, Connolly became involved in team management and coaching, including as manager of the Mayo senior team.

== Honours ==
Castlegar

- All-Ireland Senior Club Hurling Championship (1): 1980
- Connacht Senior Club Hurling Championship (2): 1979, 1984
- Galway Senior Club Hurling Championship (2): 1979, 1984

Sporting positions
Preceded by Martin Brennan	Mayo Senior Hurling Manager; 2011-2012	Succeeded by Christy Phillips
