= Ronan O'Neill =

Gaelic footballer

- Born: Omagh, County Tyrone, Northern Ireland
- Citizenship: Irish
- Education: Omagh CBS
- Occupation: Gaelic football coach
- Employer: Louth GAA
- Known for: Tyrone Gaelic football career

Ronan O'Neill is an Irish Gaelic footballer. He played in the 2018 All Ireland Final. He is working as a coach with the Fermanagh senior football team.

== Career ==
He won the 2014 Tyrone Senior Football Championship with his club Omagh St Enda's, scoring a last-minute goal against Carrickmore St Colmcille's in the final to bring about a scoreline of 1–10 to 0-12 and end a 26-year gap since the club's previous SFC title in 1988. He also won the 2017 Tyrone Senior Football Championship with his club.

O'Neill retired from play after lifting the Sam Maguire Cup after just missing out on the matchday panel for the 2021 Decider and giving ten years of inter-county surface. He plays club football for Omagh St Edna's.

O'Neill was added to the Fermanagh backroom team with Kieran Donnelly as manager to coach forward play.
