= Omagh St Enda's GAA =

Tyrone-based Gaelic games club

Omagh St Enda's
- Naoimh Éanna An Ómaigh
- Founded: 1932
- County: Tyrone
- Colours: White and Black
- Grounds: Healy Park
- Coordinates: 54°36′49.26″N 7°17′46.38″W

Playing kits
Standard colours	Second colours

Senior Club Championships
	All Ireland	Ulster champions	Tyrone champions
Football:	0	0	8
Hurling:	0	0	5

Omagh St Enda's is a Gaelic Athletic Association club from Omagh, County Tyrone, Northern Ireland.

Conor Sally is club chairman.

== History ==
GAA clubs existed in Drumragh parish during 1904-09 (including hurling and camogie), 1917–20 and intermittently in the 1920s. However it wasn't until 1932 when the Omagh St Enda's club was founded. The club's first meeting took place on 28 February in St Patrick's Hall opposite the Sacred Heart Church. Omagh contested the Tyrone Senior Football Championship final on four occasions before eventually winning the cup for the first time in 1948, beating Clogher Éire Óg GAC 1–3 to 0–2.

In early 1962, the Omagh St Enda's club purchased 13 acres (53,000 m^{2}) of land at Lisnelly located near the Gortin Road. By 1968 the club had raised enough money to start construction of the new stadium. The park was eventually opened on 17 September 1972 and was named Healy Park after Micheal Healy.

Since the club's inception, it has claimed 8 Tyrone Senior Football Championships, 3 Tyrone Senior Hurling Championships and Ulster Minor and U21 Championships. The club also has 7 All-Ireland titles in Scór.

In 2005, Joe McMahon became the first Omagh man to lift the Sam Maguire Cup. In 2008, brothers Joe and Justin McMahon were part of the victorious All-Ireland Senior Football Championship team, with Joe McMahon claiming his second All-Ireland medal. Justin McMahon went on to win an All-Star for the full-back position in the same year, the first St Enda's club man to achieve the award.

== Notable players ==
- Joe McMahon
- Justin McMahon
- Conor Meyler
- Ronan O'Neill

== Recent successes ==
St Enda's won the 2014 Tyrone Senior Football Championship against Carrickmore St Colmcille's on a scoreline of 1–10 to 0–12. A last-minute goal from Ronan O'Neill sealed victory and bridged a 26-year gap since the club's last senior championship triumph in 1988.

St Enda's have also had great success at youth level over the last number of years. The highlights being the 2009 Ulster Minor Club Football Championship and the 2011 Ulster U21 Club Football Championship victorys. Since 2007, St Enda's have claimed 3 Juvenile Leagues (2007, 2008, 2009), 3 Juvenile Championships (2007, 2008, 2009), 3 Minor Leagues (2008, 2009, 2010), 2 Minor Championships (2009, 2010) and 3 U21 Championships (2009, 2011, 2014).

In ladies football, St Enda's won the Tyrone Junior Championship and Ulster Championships in 2010. The ladies went on to win the Tyrone Intermediate Championship in 2011 and more recently in 2014.

== Honours ==
=== Men's Football ===
- Tyrone Senior Football Championship (8)
  - 1948, 1952, 1953, 1954, 1957, 1963, 1988, 2014, 2017
- Tyrone All-County League Division 1 (3)
  - 1980, 1988, 1990
- Tyrone Intermediate Football Championship (1)
  - 1977
- Ulster Under-21 Club Football Championship (1)
  - 2011
- Tyrone U-21 Football Championship (3)
  - 2009, 2011, 2014
- Ulster Minor Club Football Championship (1)
  - 2009
- Tyrone Minor Football Championship (9)
  - 1946, 1947, 1949, 1965, 1970, 1971, 1983, 2009, 2010

=== Hurling ===
- Tyrone Senior Hurling Championship (3 times):
  - 1967, 1971, 1973
