= Tyrone Senior Hurling Championship =

Annual hurling competition in northern Ireland

- Current season or competition: 2026 Tyrone Senior Hurling Championship
- Code: Hurling
- Founded: 1905
- Region: Tyrone (GAA)
- No. of teams: 4
- Title holders: Eoghan Ruadh, Dungannon (25th title)
- Most titles: Éire Óg Carrickmore (32 titles)

The Tyrone Senior Hurling Championship (Abbreviated to the Tyrone SHC) is an annual hurling competition contested by top-tier Tyrone GAA clubs. The Tyrone County Board of the Gaelic Athletic Association has organised it since 1905.

Eoghan Ruadh, Dungannon are the title holders, defeating Éire Óg Carrickmore in the 2026 final. This was Eoghan Ruadh, Dungannon’s first title since 2019.

== History ==
In 2008, the county final was decided in a replay, and was the first time the Tyrone Senior Hurling Club Championship final was ever played under floodlights. Carrickmore captured their 19th title, completing 3-in-row, for the second time in 7 years, and putting them one behind the leaders Eoghan Ruadh with 20. Eoghan Ruadh are the longest serving club since 1944. Eoghan Ruadh Dún Geanainn won the 2009 final un-expectedly defeating rivals Éire Óg An Charraig Mhor to claim their 21st title.

In 2010, Éire Óg reclaimed the Benburb Cup over holders Dungannon. In the 2014 championship finals, Éire Óg defeated Eoghan Ruadh in Healy Park to claim the club's 23rd Senior Championship, making them the record holders of the Benburb Cup.

=== Format history ===
Since 2005, the competition involves five clubs playing each other once in a round robin group. After all games are completed, the top two teams play each other in the Tyrone Senior Hurling Championship Final for the Benburb Cup while the teams that finish 3rd and 4th play for the Tyrone Junior Hurling Championship.

==== Format (2005–2023) ====
Group stage: The 4 clubs start in the groups stage. Over the course of the group stage, each team plays once against the others in the group, resulting in each team being guaranteed three group games. Two points are awarded for a win, one for a draw and zero for a loss. The teams are ranked in the group stage table by points gained, then scoring difference and then their head-to-head record. The top two teams in the group qualify for the final.

Final: Teams that finished 1st and 2nd place in the group stage contest the final. The winning team are declared champions.

Tyrone JHC: Teams that finished 3rd and 4th place in the group stage contest the final. The winning team are declared champions.

== Format ==
=== Knockout stage ===
Final: The two participating teams contest the final. The winning team are declared champions.

=== Tyrone JHC ===
Final: The two lower ranked hurling teams in Tyrone contest the final. The winning team are declared champions.

=== Relegation ===
There is no direct relegation to the Tyrone Junior Hurling Championship.

=== Qualification ===
At the end of the championship, the winning team qualify to the subsequent Ulster Intermediate Club Hurling Championship.

== Teams ==
=== 2026 teams ===
The 2 teams competing in the 2026 Tyrone Senior Hurling Championship were:

Club	Location	Colours	Position in 2026	In championship since	Championship titles	Last championship title
Éire Óg Carrickmore	Carrickmore	Black and amber	Champions	1972	32	2025
Eoghan Ruadh, Dungannon	Dungannon	Red and white	Runners-up	1971	25	2026

== Qualification for subsequent competitions ==
At the end of the championship, the winning team qualify to the subsequent Ulster Intermediate Club Hurling Championship, the winner of which progresses to the All-Ireland Intermediate Club Hurling Championship.

== List of finals ==
=== Legend ===
- Gold – Ulster intermediate club champions
- Silver – Ulster intermediate club runners-up
- (R) — replay

=== List of Tyrone SHC finals ===
Year	Winners		Runners-up	
Year	Club	Score	Club	Score
2026	Eoghan Ruadh, Dungannon	1-16	Éire Óg Carrickmore	2-10
2025	Éire Óg Carrickmore	2-15	Eoghan Ruadh, Dungannon	0-18
2024	Éire Óg Carrickmore	3-16	Eoghan Ruadh, Dungannon	3-13
2023	Éire Óg Carrickmore	1-15	Eoghan Ruadh, Dungannon	2-06
2022	Éire Óg Carrickmore	1-28	Naomh Colum Cille	0-04
2021	Éire Óg Carrickmore	0-16	Eoghan Ruadh, Dungannon	0-09
2020	Éire Óg Carrickmore		Eoghan Ruadh, Dungannon	
2019	Eoghan Ruadh, Dungannon	1-20	Éire Óg Carrickmore	2-15
2018	Eoghan Ruadh, Dungannon	1-15	Éire Óg Carrickmore	2-10
2017	Éire Óg Carrickmore	3-11	Eoghan Ruadh, Dungannon	0-12
2016	Éire Óg Carrickmore	3-14	Eoghan Ruadh, Dungannon	2-14
2015	Éire Óg Carrickmore	1-14	Eoghan Ruadh, Dungannon	1-13
2014	Éire Óg Carrickmore	1-19	Eoghan Ruadh, Dungannon	0-09
2013	Eoghan Ruadh, Dungannon		Éire Óg Carrickmore	
2012	Eoghan Ruadh, Dungannon		Éire Óg Carrickmore	
2011	Éire Óg Carrickmore		Naomh Colum Cille	
2010	Éire Óg Carrickmore	1-11	Eoghan Ruadh, Dungannon	1-06
2009	Eoghan Ruadh, Dungannon		Éire Óg Carrickmore	
2008	Éire Óg Carrickmore		Eoghan Ruadh, Dungannon	
2007	Éire Óg Carrickmore		Eoghan Ruadh, Dungannon	
2006	Éire Óg Carrickmore		Eoghan Ruadh, Dungannon	
2005	Eoghan Ruadh, Dungannon		Éire Óg Carrickmore	
2004	Éire Óg Carrickmore		Shamrocks	
2003	Éire Óg Carrickmore		Eoghan Ruadh, Dungannon	
2002	Éire Óg Carrickmore		Eoghan Ruadh, Dungannon	
2001	Eoghan Ruadh, Dungannon		Éire Óg Carrickmore	
2000	Eoghan Ruadh, Dungannon		Éire Óg Carrickmore	
1999	Eoghan Ruadh, Dungannon		Éire Óg Carrickmore	
1998	Éire Óg Carrickmore			
1997	Eoghan Ruadh, Dungannon			
1996	Eoghan Ruadh, Dungannon			
1995	Killyclogher St Mary's			
1994	Killyclogher St Mary's			
1993	Eoghan Ruadh, Dungannon			
1992	Eoghan Ruadh, Dungannon			
1991	Killyclogher St Mary's			
1990	Eoghan Ruadh, Dungannon			
1989	Éire Óg Carrickmore			
1988	Éire Óg Carrickmore			
1987	Éire Óg Carrickmore			
1986	Éire Óg Carrickmore			
1985	Éire Óg Carrickmore			
1984	Éire Óg Carrickmore			
1983	Éire Óg Carrickmore			
1982	Éire Óg Carrickmore			
1981	Eoghan Ruadh, Dungannon			
1980	Éire Óg Carrickmore			
1979	Éire Óg Carrickmore			
1978	Eoghan Ruadh, Dungannon			
1977	Killyclogher St Mary's			
1976	Éire Óg Carrickmore			
1975	Eoghan Ruadh, Dungannon			
1974	Éire Óg Carrickmore			
1973	Omagh St Enda's			
1972	Éire Óg Carrickmore			
1971	Omagh St Enda's			
1970	No competition			
1969	Eoghan Ruadh, Dungannon			
1968	No competition			
1967	Omagh St Enda's			
1966	Eoghan Ruadh, Benburb			
1962–1965	No competition			
1961	St Vincent's, Dungannon			
1958–1960	No competition			
1957	Eoghan Ruadh, Dungannon			
1956	Eoghan Ruadh, Dungannon			
1955	Eoghan Ruadh, Dungannon			
1954	No competition			
1953	Knockmoyle, Cappagh			
1952	Eoghan Ruadh, Dungannon			
1951	Eoghan Ruadh, Dungannon			
1950	Knockmoyle, Cappagh			
1949	Glassmullagh–Dromore			
1948	Eoghan Ruadh, Dungannon			
1947	Knockmoyle, Cappagh			
1927–1946	No competition			
1926	Strabane Lamh Dearg		Omagh	
1907–1925	No competition			
1906	Killyclogher St Patrick's			
1905	Strabane Lamh Dearg			

== Roll of honour ==
=== By club ===
No.	Club	Titles	Runners-up	Championship wins	Championships runner-up
1	Éire Óg Carrickmore	32	10	1972, 1974, 1976, 1979, 1980, 1982, 1983, 1984, 1985, 1986, 1987, 1988, 1989, 1998, 2002, 2003, 2004, 2006, 2007, 2008, 2010, 2011, 2014, 2015, 2016, 2017, 2020, 2021, 2022, 2023, 2024, 2025	1999, 2000, 2001, 2005, 2009, 2012, 2013, 2018, 2019, 2026
2	Eoghan Ruadh, Dungannon	25	15	1948, 1951, 1952, 1955, 1956, 1957, 1969, 1975, 1978, 1981, 1990, 1992, 1993, 1996, 1997, 1999, 2000, 2001, 2005, 2009, 2012, 2013, 2018, 2019, 2026	2002, 2003, 2006, 2007, 2008, 2010, 2014, 2015, 2016, 2017, 2020, 2021, 2023, 2024, 2025
3	Killyclogher St Mary's	4	0	1977, 1991, 1994, 1995	—
4	Knockmoyle, Cappagh	3	0	1947, 1950, 1953	—
4	Omagh St Enda's	3	0	1967, 1971, 1973	—
6	Strabane Lámh Dhearg	2	0	1905, 1926	—
7	Killyclogher St Patrick's	1	0	1906	—
7	Glassmullagh–Dromore	1	0	1949	—
7	St Vincent's, Dungannon	1	0	1961	—
7	Eoghan Ruadh, Benburb	1	0	1966	—
11	Naomh Colum Cille	0	2	—	2011, 2022
11	Shamrocks	0	1	—	2004

=== Notes ===
- Unknown runners-up: 1905, 1906, 1947–53, 1955–57, 1961, 1966, 1967, 1969, 1971–98

== Tyrone Junior Hurling Championship ==
Tyrone Junior Hurling Championship
- Current season or competition: 2026 Tyrone Junior Hurling Championship
- Code: Hurling
- Region: Tyrone (GAA)
- No. of teams: 2
- Title holders: Omagh St Enda's

The Tyrone Junior Hurling Championship (Abbreviated to the Tyrone JHC) is an annual hurling competition organised by the Tyrone County Board of the Gaelic Athletic Association and contested by the junior clubs in the county of Tyrone in Ireland. It is the second tier in the Tyrone hurling championship system.

Omagh St Enda's are the title-holders, defeating Naomh Colum Cille by 2-14 to 2-9 in the 2025 final.

=== Format ===
Final: Teams that finished 3rd and 4th place in the group stage of the Tyrone Senior Hurling Championship contest the final. The winning team are declared champions.

=== Teams ===
Club	Location	Colours	Championship titles	Last championship title
Naomh Colum Cille	Clonoe	Red and black	4	2021
Omagh St Enda's	Omagh	White and black	3	2025

=== Qualification for subsequent competitions ===
At the end of the championship, the winning team qualify to the subsequent Ulster Junior Club Hurling Championship, the winner of which progresses to the All-Ireland Junior Club Hurling Championship.

=== List of finals (2017–present) ===
Year	Winners		Runners-up	
Year	Club	Score	Club	Score
2026	Omagh St Enda's	1-12	Naomh Colum Cille	0-12
2025	Omagh St Enda's	2-14	Naomh Colum Cille	2-9
2024	Omagh St Enda's	3-19	Naomh Colum Cille	2-11
2023	Omagh St Enda's	2-14	Naomh Colum Cille	1-13
2022	Eoghan Ruadh, Dungannon	4-18	Omagh St Enda's	0-05
2021	No championship			
2020	Naomh Colum Cille	3-16	Omagh St Enda's	1-07
2019	Naomh Colum Cille	3-22	Omagh St Enda's	0-06
2018	Éire Óg Carrickmore	0-20	Naomh Colum Cille	1-13
2017	Naomh Colum Cille	7-21	Killyclogher St Mary's	0-00

=== Roll of honour (2017–) ===
#	Club	Titles	Runners-up	Championship wins	Championship runner-up
1	Naomh Colum Cille	4	3	2017, 2019, 2020 ,2021	2018, 2023, 2025
2	Omagh St Enda's	3	3	2023, 2024, 2025	2019, 2020, 2022
3	Éire Óg Carrickmore	1	0	2018	
3	Eoghan Ruadh, Dungannon	1	0	2022	
5	Killyclogher St Mary's	0	1	—	2017

== See also ==
- Tyrone Junior Hurling Championship (Tier 2)
- Tyrone Senior Football Championship
