= Tooreen Hurling Club =

Gaelic games club in County Mayo, Ireland

- Club Iománaíochta Tuarín
- Founded: 1957
- County: Mayo
- Nickname: The Blue Devils / The Village
- Colours
- Grounds: Adrian Freeman Memorial Park
- Coordinates: 53°49′40″N 8°45′38″W

Playing kits
Standard colours

Senior Club Championships
	All Ireland	Connacht champions	Mayo champions
Hurling:	0	0	36

Tooreen Hurling Club is a Gaelic Athletic Association club in Tooreen, County Mayo, Ireland. The club is affiliated to the Mayo County Board and is solely concerned with the game of hurling.

== History ==
Located in the village of Tooreen, approximately four miles (6.4 km) from the town of Ballyhaunis, Tooreen Hurling Club was founded in 1957, with James Horan serving as the club's first president. Tooreen's first major success came in 1966, when the club won it's inaugural Mayo SHC title after beating reigning champions Cong in the final.

Tooreen have dominated every decade since then and won 10 consecutive Mayo SHC titles between 1978 and 1987. A North Mayo amalgamation ended the run of consecutive titles, however, Tooreen returned to win the first of seven consecutive titles in 1989. The club won it's 25th Mayo SHC title in 2000.

Tooreen's dominance continued in the first decades of the 21st century, with the club winning nine Mayo SHC titles in 10 seasons between 2017 and 2026. During this period, the club also won seven Connacht Club IHC titles. Tooreen were beaten by Monaleen and Upperchurch–Drombane in the respective All-Ireland Club IHC finals in 2023 and 2026.

== Grounds ==
Tooreen's home ground is Adrian Freeman Memorial Park. It is named in honour of Adrian Freeman, a club member who was killed in a traffic collision in Australia in May 2010, at the age of 24. The official renaming ceremony took place on 4 June 2017.

== Honours ==
- Connacht Intermediate Club Hurling Championship (7): 2017, 2019, 2021, 2022, 2023, 2025, 2026
- Mayo Senior Hurling Championship (36): 1966, 1972, 1974, 1975, 1978, 1979, 1980, 1981, 1982, 1983, 1984, 1985, 1986, 1987, 1989, 1990, 1991, 1992, 1993, 1994, 1995, 1997, 1998, 1999, 2000, 2003, 2013, 2017, 2018, 2019, 2021, 2022, 2023, 2024, 2025, 2026

== Notable players ==
- Shane Boland: Nicky Rackard Cup-winner (2016, 2021)
- Kenny Feeney: Nicky Rackard Cup-winner (2016, 2021)
