= Fermanagh Senior Hurling Championship =

Hurling competition in County Fermanagh, Ireland

- Code: Hurling
- Founded: 1904
- Region: Fermanagh (GAA)
- No. of teams: 1
- Title holders: Lisbellaw St Patrick's (31st title)
- Most titles: Lisbellaw St Patrick's (31 titles)

The Fermanagh Senior Hurling Championship was an annual Gaelic Athletic Association competition organised since 1904 by Fermanagh GAA among the top hurling clubs in County Fermanagh. The winner qualifies to represent the county in the Ulster Junior Club Hurling Championship or the Ulster Intermediate Club Hurling Championship, the winners of which progress to the respective All-Ireland Club Hurling Championships.

As of 2016, just one club, Lisbellaw St Patricks, represent County Fermanagh in hurling. This has been the case since the Lisnaskea club folded in 2015.

== Teams ==
=== 2025 Teams ===
The 1 team expected to enter the 2025 Fermanagh Senior Hurling Championship is:

Club	Location	Colours	Position in 2024	In championship since	Championship titles	Last championship title
Lisbellaw St Patrick's	Lisbellaw	Green and white	Ulster Intermediate quarter-finals	2025	31	2013

=== 2025 Hurling Grades ===
Championship	Club
Senior
Senior	Lisbellaw St Patrick's
Junior
Reserve	Lisbellaw St Patrick's (2nd team)
Reserve	Erne Gaels

== Format ==
=== Fermanagh Senior Hurling Championship ===
As there is currently only 1 club in the championship, no championship takes place and no title given out but the club still represents Fermanagh in the provincial championship.

=== Fermanagh Reserve Hurling Championship ===
Final: Erne Gaels and Lisbellaw St Patrick's second team contest the final. The winning team are declared champions.

== Qualification for subsequent competitions ==
As Fermanagh’s representatives, Lisbellaw St Patrick's qualify to the subsequent Ulster Intermediate Club Hurling Championship, the winner of which progresses to the All-Ireland Intermediate Club Hurling Championship.

== List of finals ==
Year	Winner		Runners-up	
Year	Club	Score	Club	Score
2014–	No championship			
2013	Lisbellaw St Patrick's	4-14	Lisnaskea Emmets	0-10
2012	Lisbellaw St Patrick's	6-23	Lisnaskea Emmets	2-05
2011	Lisbellaw St Patrick's	2-10	Lisnaskea	0-09
2010	Lisbellaw St Patrick's	3-11	Lisnaskea	0-08
2009	Lisbellaw St Patrick's	3-14	Lisnaskea	0-15
2008	Lisbellaw St Patrick's	3-14	Lisnaskea	0-11
2007	Lisbellaw St Patrick's	1-10	Lisnaskea	0-11
2006	Lisbellaw St Patrick's		Lisnaskea	
2005	Lisnaskea	0-11	Lisbellaw St Patrick's	0-10
2004	Lisbellaw St Patrick's		Lisnaskea	
2003	Lisbellaw St Patrick's		Lisnaskea	
2002	Lisbellaw St Patrick's		Lisnaskea	
2001	Lisbellaw St Patrick's		Lisnaskea	
2000	Lisbellaw St Patrick's	w/o	Lisnaskea	DNF (did not field)
1999	Lisbellaw St Patrick's		Lisnaskea	
1998	Lisbellaw St Patrick's		Lisnaskea	
1997	Lisbellaw St Patrick's		Lisnaskea	
1996	Lisbellaw St Patrick's			
1995	Lisbellaw St Patrick's			
1994	Lisbellaw St Patrick's			
1993	Lisbellaw St Patrick's			
1992	No Championship			
1991	Lisbellaw St Patrick's			
1990	Enniskillen Gaels			
1989	Lisbellaw St Patrick's			
1988	Lisbellaw St Patrick's			
1987	Lisbellaw St Patrick's			
1986	Lisbellaw St Patrick's			
1985	Lisbellaw St Patrick's			
1984	Erne Gaels, Belleek			
1983	Lisbellaw St Patrick's			
1982	Lisbellaw St Patrick's			
1981	Erne Gaels, Belleek			
1980	Lisnaskea Emmetts			
1979	Enniskillen Gaels			
1978	No Championship			
1977	Lisbellaw St Patrick's			
1976	Lisbellaw St Patrick's			
1975	Erne Gaels, Belleek			
1974	Erne Gaels, Belleek			
1973	Erne Gaels, Belleek			
1972	Lisbellaw St Patrick's			
1947–1971	No Championship			
1946	Glasmullagh			
1945	Glasmullagh			
1940–1944	Not Played			
1939	Coa O'Dwyers			
1938	Coa O'Dwyers			
1937	Newtownbutler			
1936	Glasmullagh			
1935	Coa O'Dwyers			
1909–1934	Not Played			
1908	Ashwoods Maguires			
1907	Enniskillen O'Neill's			
1906	Enniskillen O'Neill's			
1905	Ashwoods Maguires			
1904	Enniskillen O'Neill's			

== Roll of honour ==
=== By club ===
#	Club	Titles	Championship wins
1	Lisbellaw St Patrick's	31	1972, 1976, 1977, 1982, 1983, 1985, 1986, 1987, 1988, 1989, 1991, 1993, 1994, 1995, 1996, 1997, 1998, 1999, 2000, 2001, 2002, 2003, 2004, 2006, 2007, 2008, 2009, 2010, 2011, 2012, 2013
2	Erne Gaels	5	1973, 1974, 1975, 1981, 1984
3	Enniskillen O'Neill's	3	1904, 1906, 1907
3	Coa O'Dwyers	3	1935, 1938, 1939
3	Glasmullagh	3	1936, 1945, 1946
6	Ashwoods Maguires	2	1905, 1908
6	Enniskillen Gaels	2	1979, 1990
6	Lisnaskea Emmetts	2	1980, 2005
9	Newtownbutler First Fermanaghs	1	1937

== Fermanagh Junior Hurling Championship ==
Fermanagh Junior Hurling Championship
- Code: Hurling
- Region: Fermanagh (GAA)
- No. of teams: 3
- Title holders: Erne Gaels (4th title)

The Fermanagh Junior Hurling Championship is an annual hurling competition organised by the Fermanagh County Board of the Gaelic Athletic Association and contested by the junior clubs in the county of Fermanagh in Ireland. It is the second tier in the Fermanagh hurling championship system.

Erne Gaels are the title-holders, defeating Belnaleck Art MacMurroughs in the 2026 final.

=== Format ===
3 teams participated in 2026.

Belnaleck Art MacMurroughs and Knocks Grattans contested a semi-final. The winner qualified for the Final.

Final: The winner of the semi-final and Erne Gaels contest the final. The winning team are declared champions.

=== Qualification for subsequent competitions ===
At the end of the championship, the winning team qualify to the subsequent Ulster Junior Club Hurling Championship, the winner of which progresses to the All-Ireland Junior Club Hurling Championship.

=== List of finals (2023–) ===
Year	Winner		Runners-up		#
Year	Club	Score	Club	Score	#
2026	Erne Gaels	2-29	Belnaleck Art MacMurroughs	0-03	
2025	Erne Gaels				
2024	Erne Gaels	0–14	Lisbellaw St Patrick's	0–12	
2023	Erne Gaels	3–11	Lisbellaw St Patrick's	2–10	

=== Roll of honour (2023–) ===
#	Club	Titles	Runners-up	Championship wins	Championship runner-up
1	Erne Gaels	4	0	2023, 2024, 2025, 2026	—
2	Lisbellaw St Patrick's	0	2	—	2023, 2024
	Belnaleck Art MacMurroughs	0	1	—	2026

== See also ==
- Fermanagh Senior Football Championship
- Ulster Intermediate Club Hurling Championship
