= Éire Óg Carrickmore =

Hurling club from County Tyrone, Northern Ireland

Éire Óg, Carrickmore
- Éire Óg An Charraig Mhór
- Founded: 1970
- County: Tyrone
- Colours: Black and Amber
- Grounds: Éire Óg Grounds, 25a Termon Road
- Coordinates: 54°35′39″N 7°02′47″W

Playing kits

Senior Club Championships
	All Ireland	Ulster champions	Tyrone champions
Hurling:	0	1	32

Éire Óg Carrickmore is a hurling club from Carrickmore, County Tyrone, Northern Ireland. Their seniors have won the Tyrone Senior Hurling Championship a record 32 times, with the most recent in 2025, and their first in 1972.

== Founding ==
While memories exist of the ancient game of camán, a precursor to the modern game of hurling, having been played locally in the 19th century, it was not until 1968 that hurling was revived in the parish by Kerryman Gerry Ryle. Gerry had come to teach at Dean Brian Maguirc School and upon coming across unused hurleys in the school gym in 1968, hurling came to life in Carrickmore. From that point Gerry bestowed his passion and enthusiasm for the game hurling upon the youth of the Dean who continued their interest after leaving school to the natural progression of forming Carrickmore's hurling club under the umbrella of St Colmcille's in 1970. However, it was not until 1974 that the club was named Éire Óg and separated from the football club.

== Achievements ==
In 1970, history was made when the Juveniles won the Tyrone Championship, beating Dungannon in the final The club struggled to survive in those early days and only for the determination of people like Oliver Kerr, the club would not have made it. In 1976, the club colours of black and amber, inspired by All Ireland winning champions Kilkenny, were first worn.

The Seniors first won the County Championship and took home the Benburb Cup in 1972, and during the 70s twice again took it back but it was during the 80s that Éire Óg first had its great success with the underage players of the 70s coming of age. They won the County Championship a remarkable 8 times in a row from 1982 to 1989. By 1990 they had appeared in the County final a staggering 13 times in a row. In 1998, the Seniors broke through to the next level and won the Ulster Shield, while in 2001, the Dean won their first Ulster Vocational Schools U16 championship and then the Minors won the Ulster Championship in 2003. Success was had as well in the Armagh League which was won for the first time in 2004, the historic year of the "clean sweep" in which Carrickmore hurlers and footballers won all county titles at all levels, while the U16s won their first Armagh League title in 2006.

In 2025, the Senior Hurlers won their 5th Tyrone Senior Hurling Championship in a row and on November 30, they managed to win the Ulster Intermediate Hurling Championship for the first time ever after losing the 2010, 2015 and 2023 finals.

== Camogie ==
The woman's game Camogie was established in the parish in 1978, and flourished until 1989. During those years the camogs enjoyed a lot of success and participated at U14, Minor, U21 and Senior while a number of the players also represented Tyrone at county level. However, in Camogie's centenary year 2004, Camogie was re-established in Carrickmore under Éire Óg by Bríd Uí Dhonnghaile and they now compete at U10, Post Primary, U14, U16, Minors and seniors.
