= Lisbellaw St Patrick's GAA =

Fermanagh-based Gaelic games club

Lisbellaw St Patrick's
- Naomh Pádraig Lios Béal Átha
- Founded: 1968
- County: Fermanagh
- Colours: Green and White
- Grounds: Cavancarragh Youth Club
- Coordinates: 54°20′45″N 7°33′10″W

Playing kits
Standard colours

Senior Club Championships
	All Ireland	Ulster champions	Fermanagh champions
Hurling:	0	2	29

Lisbellaw St Patrick's are a hurling club from central County Fermanagh, Northern Ireland. They are the only adult hurling club in Fermanagh, the club has won the Fermanagh Senior Hurling Championship on 31 occasions.

== History ==
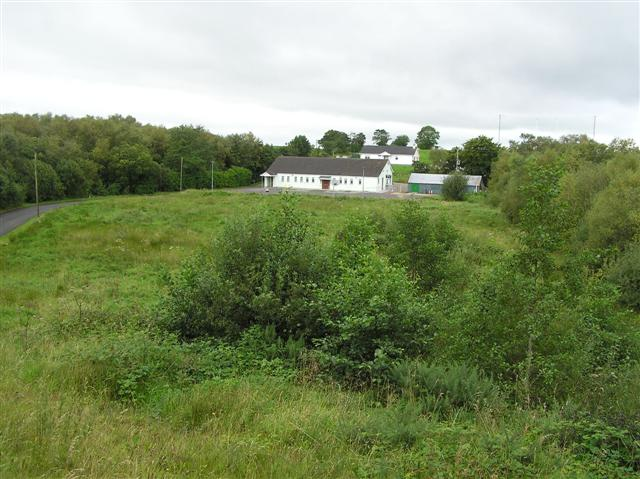
Buildings at Cavancarragh Youth Club

In 1968, a number of locals decided to form a hurling team drawing on players in the Lisbellaw area, and named it for Saint Patrick. Practices began with a number of players in October 1968.

Lisbellaw St Patrick's defeated Lisnaskea in the 2013 Fermanagh Senior Hurling Championship final.

== Facilities ==
The club's grounds are situated outside the town of Lisbellaw at Cavanacarragh in central Fermanagh. Its facilities include a hurling field with ballstops and a fence around the pitch. There are also changing rooms, a meeting room, showers and toilets.

== Honours ==
- Fermanagh Senior Hurling Championship (31): 1972, 1976, 1977, 1982, 1983, 1985, 1986, 1987, 1988, 1989, 1991, 1993, 1994, 1995, 1996, 1997, 1998, 1999, 2000, 2001, 2002, 2003, 2004, 2006, 2007, 2008, 2009, 2010, 2011, 2012, 2013
- Ulster Junior Club Hurling Championship (1): 2008
- Ulster Intermediate Club Hurling Championship (1): 2012
