= Adrian Freeman =

Irish hurler and Gaelic footballer

- Adrian Freeman, photographed as he prepared for a match in the sport of hurling

Personal information
- Native name: Adrian Ó Saoire (Irish)
- Nickname: Twink
- Born: 13 March 1986 Tooreen, Ballyhaunis, County Mayo, Ireland
- Died: 29 May 2010 (aged 24) Melbourne, Victoria, Australia
- Occupation: Engineer
- Height: 5 ft 10 in (178 cm)

Sport
- Sport: Gaelic football, hurling, shinty
- Position: Corner forward
Clubs
- Years: Club
- 2002–2010: Tooreen, Aughamore
Club titles
- Mayo titles: 2003
Inter-county
- Years: County
- Mayo

Adrian Freeman (13 March 1986 – 29 May 2010) was an Irish sportsman from Tooreen, Ballyhaunis, County Mayo. He played Gaelic football and hurling.

Freeman played hurling for Mayo and was a member of the county's 2009 hurling team, which participated in both the National Hurling League (NHL) and the Christy Ring Cup. He played for Connacht in the Interprovincial Championship. He played club football for Aghamore.

His international career consisted of one hurling/shinty Under 21 international appearance in Inverness, Scotland. Freeman also played in England (four times) and toured North America during his career, whilst he was a member of the losing Connacht side from the Interprovincial Championship Final played in Abu Dhabi, Dubai, Middle East in March 2009.

Freeman's death at the age of 24 in a traffic collision in Australia on 31 May 2010 led to an outpouring of public grief in Ireland's GAA circles.

== Early life ==
Freeman was born in March 1986. He was educated in Tooreen NS from 1991 onwards. There he developed his interest in sport. Freeman played hurling for Tooreen Hurling Club from the age of seven and played football for Aghamore. He also played association football, attracting interest from Leeds United in 2000. Freeman progressed to Ballyhaunis Community School in 1999 and graduated as a civil engineer from Limerick Institute of Technology (2004–2009).

== Career ==
The Western People said Freeman's "free-scoring exploits helped win several matches". He was nicknamed "Twink" on account of his "twinkle-toes". Freeman achieved two Connaught Under 21 B hurling championship medals with Mayo, and many underage club titles with Tooreen. In 2007 he played in a hurling/shinty Under 21 international encounter in Inverness, Scotland. He performed twice each in the English cities of London and Birmingham.

He toured North America with the Connaught Colleges hurling touring party when he was 16. He accompanied several future inter-county hurlers for Galway. In 2002, Freeman made his senior debut for the Tooreen team while still under 16. The following year, at the age of 17, he won a championship medal with the Mayo senior hurling team. This ultimately proved to be the only championship medal he would ever win. Freeman's debut for Mayo's senior hurling team came at Croke Park in a defeat to Kildare in the All-Ireland Senior B Hurling Championship Final.

Gerry Spellman, Frank Browne and Martin Brennan all played Freeman regularly whilst in charge of Mayo teams. According to the Connaught Telegraph, he was the most consistent performer for Mayo in both 2008 and 2009, when they reached the semi-finals stage of the Christy Ring Cup and Freeman received a Christy Ring All-Star. The same publication said he would be "best remembered for Aghamore's third goal in their 3-5 to 1-9 win over Kilmaine [in 2008] - as his famous twinkle toes chipped the ball over the advancing Kilmaine custodian to seal victory for Aghamore". His career peaked in March 2009 when he played against Leinster in the final in Abu Dhabi, Dubai of the Interprovincial Championship as part of the losing Connaught hurling team during a week-long tour of the Middle East.

Like many others at Tooreen Hurling Club, due to the 2008 financial crisis, Freeman emigrated in search of a better life. He went to Australia in October 2009, where he gained employment as a sub-contractor on the Barwon Heads bridge.

== Death ==
Freeman was killed at the age of 24 in a traffic collision whilst in Connewarre, Victoria, Melbourne at 2:40 pm local time (5:40 am Irish time) on 29 May 2010. He was driving a Toyota Camry with Robbie Twomey from Ballahadigue, Listowel, County Kerry, when a Volvo struck the pair of them. Freeman was thought to be driving at his death. Twomey was also killed in the same crash, whilst two others were also in the same car. The men were coming from work when they met their deaths. Freeman's family travelled to Melbourne, arriving by 3 June. Police in Australia investigated the circumstances.

=== Response ===
Spokesperson for Tooreen Hurling Club, Jackie Coyne, said Freeman's death had brought "heart wrenching emptiness" throughout the entire region.

There was a minute's silence at the Galway versus Wexford tie in the Leinster Senior Hurling Championship quarter-finals at Nowlan Park on 29 May 2010. Other matches were called off.

The Gaelic Players Association issued a tribute, with its CEO Dessie Farrell saying the following: "Adrian was a leading player in Mayo hurling and was honoured for his contribution in last year's Christy Ring Cup as well as being chosen for the Connacht interprovincial hurling panel. The death of a young player and his friend is deeply shocking and on behalf of the GPA I would like to pass on our sincere sympathies to the families and friends of Adrian and Robbie (Twomey) and to all Adrian's playing colleagues".

A book of condolence was opened on http://www.mayogaa.com, with hundreds leaving tributes in the first few days. 11.30 a.m. Mass was said for Freeman in Tooreen Church on 31 May, and many teammates attended.

A book of Condolence is also open on the Tooreen Hurling Club website https://web.archive.org/web/20080509124008/http://www.tooreenhurlers.com/ which features messages of sympathy and support.

Freeman was expected to come back to Ireland in August 2010 but he died in Australia before he could return.

== Personal life ==
Freeman's parents were Seamus and Ita Freeman. He had a sister, Louise, and a brother, Cathal. Louise is a doctor in Galway. Cathal is also an intercounty hurler and footballer.
