= Healy Park =

GAA stadium in Omagh, Northern Ireland

O'Neills Healy Park
- Páirc Uí hEilí
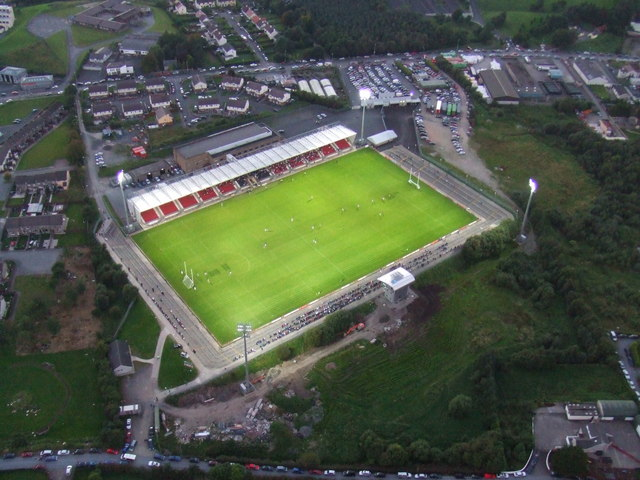

- Location within Northern Ireland
- Address: Omagh, County Tyrone BT79 7HX
- Location: Northern Ireland
- Coordinates: 54°36′50″N 7°17′46″W
- Owner: Omagh St. Enda's
- Capacity: 17,636
- Field size: 147 m × 88 m (482 ft × 289 ft)
- Public transit: Omagh Ulsterbus depot

Construction
- Opened: 1972
- Renovated: 2001
- Cost: €2 million (2001 renovation)

Tenant
- Tyrone county football team

Healy Park (known as O'Neills Healy Park for sponsorship reasons) is a GAA stadium in Omagh, County Tyrone, Northern Ireland and is named after a GAA clubman from Omagh, Michael Healy.

Healy Park is the home ground of Omagh St. Enda's and the Tyrone county football team.

The stadium is located on the Gortin Road, approximately a 10-minute walk from the town centre. It is one of the largest stadiums in Northern Ireland with a ticketed capacity of approximately 17,636.

== History ==
In early 1962, Omagh St. Enda's club purchased 13 acres (5.3 ha) of land for £1,300 at Lisanelly located near the Gortin Road. By 1968, the club had raised enough money to start construction of the new stadium. Work began in the middle of 1968 with the clearance of 10 feet of soil and bog and its replacement with tens of thousands of tons of gravel, stones, and topsoil, coupled with an elaborate drainage system. The field was sown early in 1969 and fenced a few months later.

The ground known then as New Park was opened on 17 September 1972 by then GAA President Alf Murray. On 19 October 1980, the new park was renamed to Healy Park in memory of Michael Healy. The two years between 1980 and 1982 saw the fruition of the new clubrooms and social centre at Healy Park, which added further to the infrastructure of Healy Park. 1994 saw the terracing added to three sides of the pitch.

Work began in September 2001 to build a new all-seated covered stand with a capacity of 5,000. The stand was opened in 2004.

In April 2006, Healy Park became the first Gaelic football stadium in Ulster to have floodlighting installed.

In December 2006, Tyrone GAA unveiled plans for a £5 million redevelopment scheme. Included in the plans were a second covered stand, a new control tower, a press box, the installation of a lift in the stand, and a new changing and referee's room. They also planned to expand the ends behind both goals.

Construction of the Press Box and Control Tower was completed in October 2007 with new changing rooms and disabled facilities also having been installed. However, the plan to construct the second covered stand at Healy Park has yet to materialise.

In January 2020, Tyrone GAA announced a pitch refurbishment project costing upwards of £1 million for Healy Park. This project was to begin in May 2020 and would have resulted in the closure of the stadium for a year. However, this project failed to materlise due to the outset of the COVID-19 pandemic.

In September 2023, Tyrone GAA unveiled a new £280,000 floodlighting system for Healy Park in a Tyrone Senior Football Championship meeting between Errigal Ciaran and Killyclogher. This major upgrade involved an energy-efficient LED system replacing the existing halogen lamps.

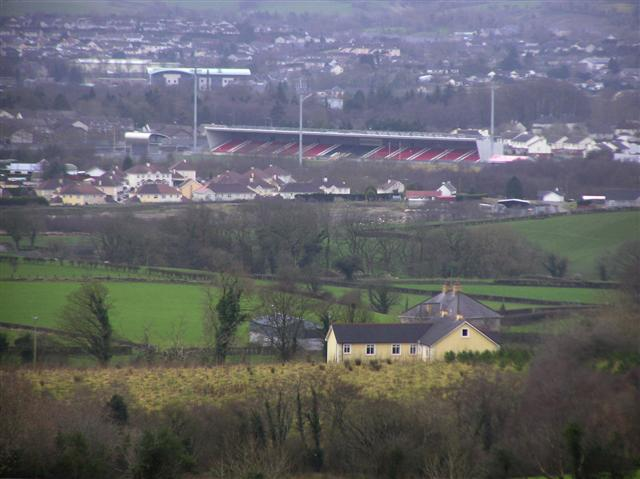
Healy Park seen from the Rylagh Road

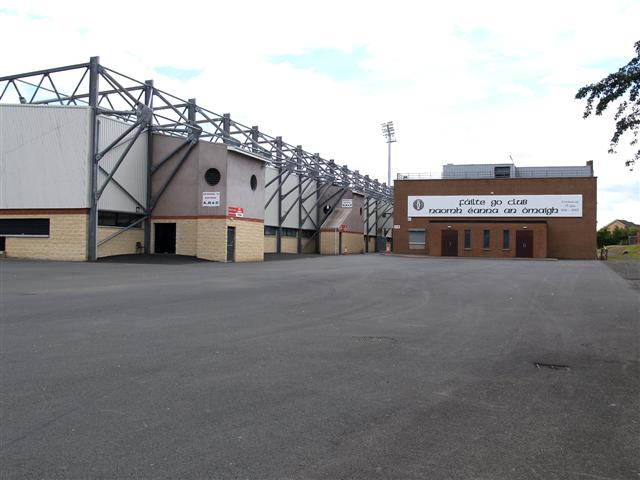
Healy Park club house

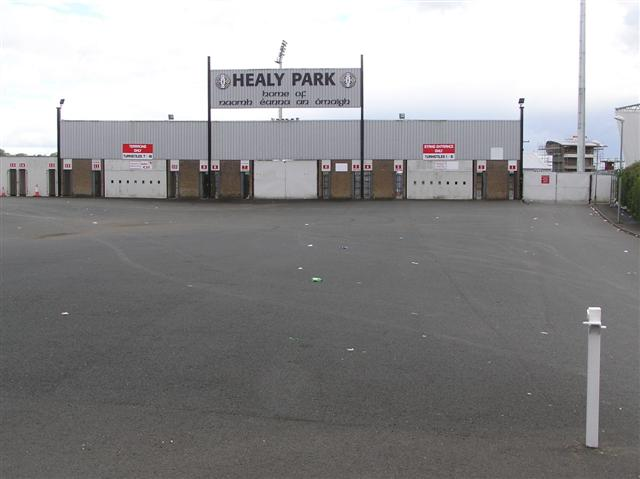
Healy Park Entrance

== See also ==
- List of Gaelic Athletic Association stadiums
- List of stadiums in Ireland by capacity
