= Tyrone GAA =

Gaelic games governing body

- Irish: Tír Eoghain
- Nickname(s): The O'Neill County; The Red Hands
- Province: Ulster
- Dominant sport: Gaelic football
- Ground(s): Healy Park, Omagh
- County colours: White Red
- Website: tyronegaa.ie

County teams
- NFL: Division 1
- NHL: Division 3B
- Football Championship: Sam Maguire Cup
- Hurling Championship: Nicky Rackard Cup
- Ladies' Gaelic football: Brendan Martin Cup
- Camogie: Nancy Murray Cup

The Tyrone County Board (Irish: Cumann Lúthchleas Gael, Coiste Chontae Tír Eoghain), or Tyrone GAA, is one of the 32 county boards of the Gaelic Athletic Association (GAA) in Ireland, and is responsible for the administration of Gaelic games in County Tyrone, Northern Ireland.

The county board is responsible for preparing the Tyrone county teams in the various Gaelic sporting codes; football, hurling, camogie and handball.

The county football team was the sixth from the province of Ulster to win the Sam Maguire Cup, leaving only Antrim, Fermanagh and Monaghan to still win the trophy and become All-Ireland champions.

According to a 2015 TUD study by Shane Mangan, Tyrone had 10,500 players.

== Football ==
=== Clubs ===
The county's most successful football club is Carrickmore. Carrickmore has won the Tyrone Senior Football Championship on fifteen occasions. Errigal Ciarán has won the Tyrone Senior Football Championship on eleven occasions and the Ulster Senior Club Football Championship three times, in 1994, 2002 & 2024.

Two Tyrone clubs have won the men's All-Ireland Intermediate Club Championship: Cookstown Fr. Rock's GAC in 2010 and 2013, and Moy Tír Na nÓg GAC in 2018.

Greencastle GAA men won the All-Ireland Junior Club Championship in 2007. The Ladies (Sperrin Óg) won the All-Ireland Junior Club Championship in 2011.

Rock St Patrick’s won the Ulster Junior Club Football Championship in 2016 after winning the Tyrone Junior Championship.

=== County team ===
Tyrone won its first Ulster Senior Football Championship (SFC) in 1956, defending it successfully in 1957. The county did not win a third Ulster SFC title until 1973.

The Tyrone team of the mid-eighties won a fourth Ulster SFC title in 1984, and followed its fifth title in 1986 with a first ever final of the All-Ireland Senior Football Championship (SFC), where Kerry defeated it by a scoreline of 2–15 to 1-10. Tyrone added a sixth Ulster SFC (after a replay of the final) in 1989.

However, All-Ireland SFC success eluded Tyrone and the county watched as its Ulster rivals won an unprecedented four consecutive national titles in the early 1990s (two titles for Down bookending one title for Donegal, as well as Derry's only title).

Tyrone reached the 1994 Ulster SFC final but lost to eventual All-Ireland winners Down; however, Tyrone's forward Peter Canavan was Ulster's top scorer, winning his first All Star Award. The following year Tyrone were Ulster champions and, in keeping with the recent form of the winners of that competition, reached the 1995 All-Ireland Senior Football Championship Final (only the county's second ever). Dublin emerged as victors by a scoreline of 1–10 to 0–12, Canavan scoring 11 of Tyrone's 12 points. Tyrone won another Ulster SFC in 1996.

In 2003 a new Tyrone manager, Mickey Harte was appointed. Harte took Tyrone to another Ulster SFC title and victory in the All-Ireland Senior Football Championship (SFC) in his first year. The 2003 All-Ireland SFC final was Tyrone's third and had the county pitted against rival and neighbouring county Armagh, the reigning All-Ireland SFC champions (Armagh had also beaten Tyrone to the title). It was the first All-Ireland SFC final between sides from the same province.

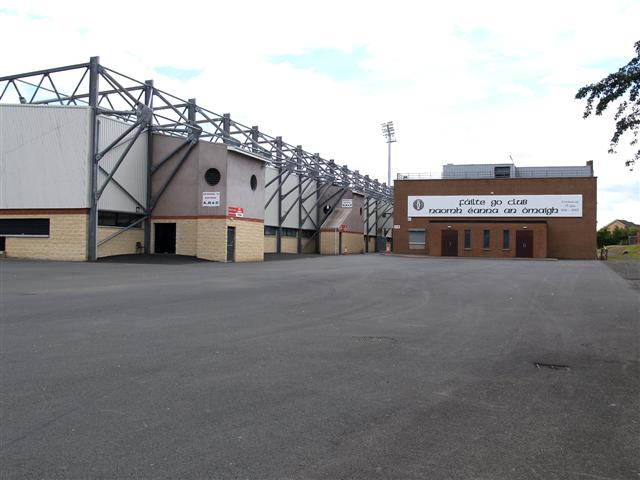
Healy Park in Omagh is the home ground of Tyrone GAA

Tragedy struck the following year with the sudden death of Cormac McAnallen, at the age of 24. Tyrone, however, came back the following year to win the All-Ireland SFC for a second time. The county played a total of ten matches, including three replays, which was a record for any winning team. Tyrone played five matches in the Ulster SFC, including replays against Cavan in the semi-final and against Armagh in the final, which they lost.

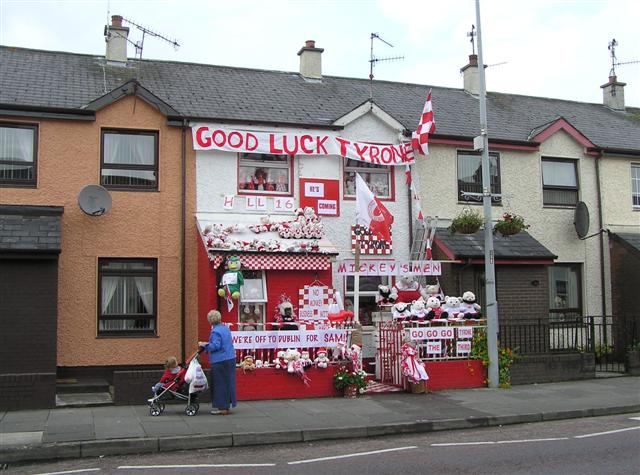
A house in Strabane showing support before 2008 All-Ireland final. Tyrone has a large support around the county.

Having to contest an All-Ireland SFC qualifier as a result of that loss, Tyrone overcame Monaghan to reach an All-Ireland SFC quarter-final against Dublin. Tyrone had yet another drawn game, a match notable for Owen Mulligan's stunning solo goal. In the All-Ireland SFC semi-final, the county met Armagh for a third time; two points behind with only six minutes of play left, Seán Cavanagh scored a solo point, substitute Shane Sweeney levelled the game and Peter Canavan converted an injury-time free. Tyrone won by a scoreline of 1–13 to 1–12. In the 2005 All-Ireland SFC final, the county defeated Kerry for the second time in three years to win the Sam Maguire Cup, sparking emotional scenes among the Tyrone team and fans, in remembrance of Cormac McAnallen.

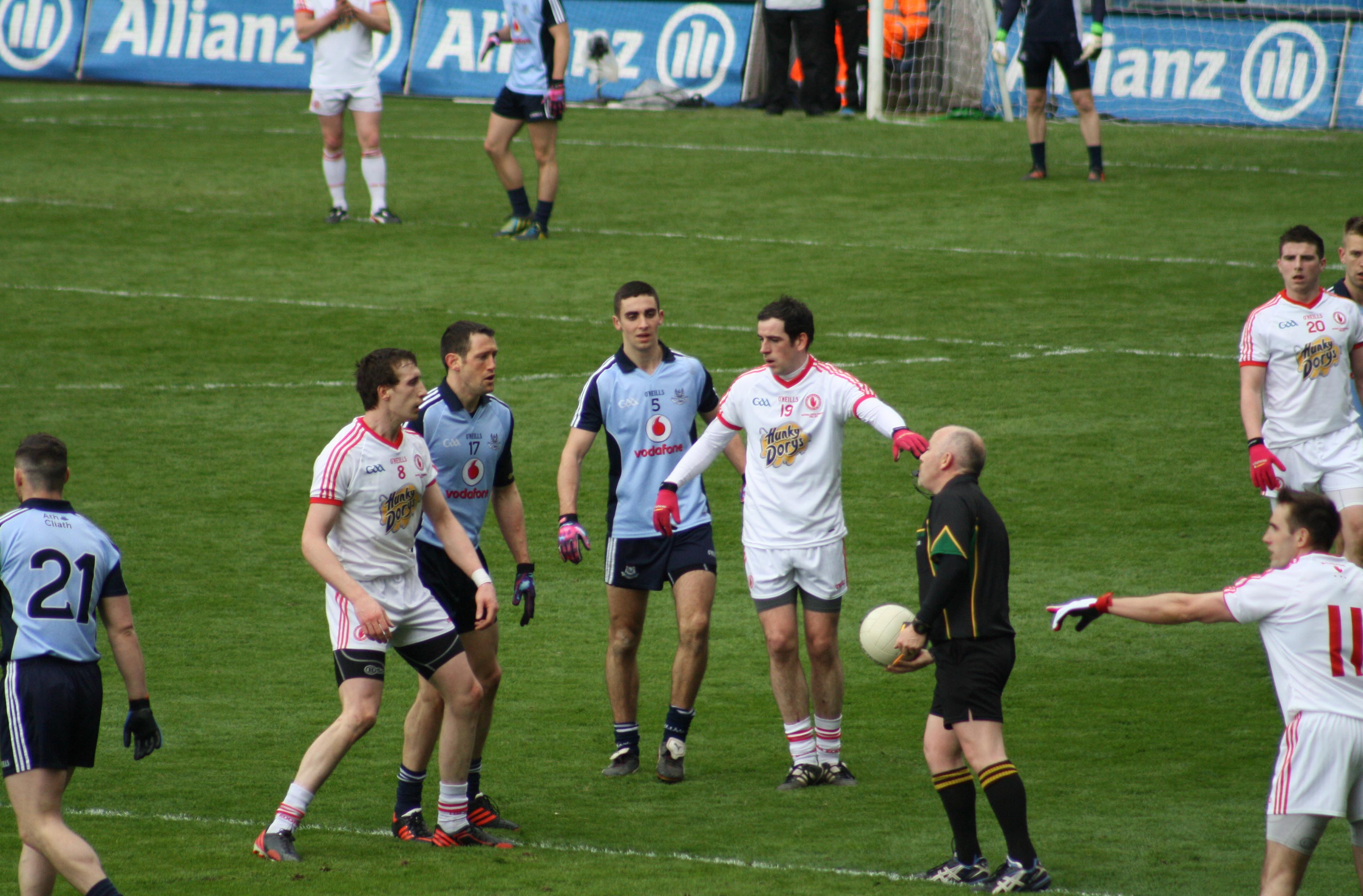
Tyrone vs Dublin match in 2013

Tyrone won its eleventh Ulster SFC title in 2007. The county lost its opening game of the 2008 Ulster SFC, a quarter-final to Down. Entering the All-Ireland SFC qualifiers again, the county's progress went largely unnoticed until it reached the All-Ireland SFC quarter-final, where Tyrone hammered Dublin by 12 points. The team advanced to the All-Ireland SFC semi-final against Wexford but did not impress against the Strawberries, appearing in at that stage for the first time since 1945. Tyrone did enough though, but entered 2008 All-Ireland SFC final against a Kerry team intent on winning three consecutive titles. Kerry did not. Despite Peter Canavan's retirement, Owen Mulligan's disciplinary problems and Stephen O'Neill's on-off retirement through injury, Tyrone prevailed to win a third All-Ireland SFC title. Tyrone defeated Kerry by a scoreline of 1–15 to 0–14.

Tyrone reached the 2018 All-Ireland Senior Football Championship Final but were unable to deny Dublin a fourth consecutive All-Ireland SFC title. Dublin's six-year hold on the Sam Maguire Cup came to an end on 11 September 2021 as Tyrone defeated Mayo in the final by a scoreline of 2–14 to 0–15.

Healy Park) is the Tyrone GAA stadium, named after a GAA clubman from Omagh, Michael Healy. Apart from the Tyrone county team, Healy Park is also the home ground of Omagh St. Enda's.

County Tyrone GAA team is currently sponsored by Cookstown based construction company McAleer & Rushe, who announced they would extend the main sponsorship deal until the end of 2025.

== Hurling ==
Clubs contest the Tyrone Senior Hurling Championship.

Gerry Goodwin of Tyrone won the 1982 All-Ireland Poc Fada Championship.

Damian Casey is widely regarded as the county's greatest hurler and played in every game for his county at senior level from his debut in 2012 untiil the 2022 Nicky Rackard Cup final, after which he died at the age of 29. He also scored in every game he played for Tyrone at senior level.

Mattie Lennon managed Tyrone for many years in the 2010s.

Michael McShane succeeded Mattie Lennon as Tyrone hurling manager in January 2021, combining it with his existing role as manager of Slaughtneil's hurling team. Receiving a three-year term, his backroom team included coach Stephen McGarry and strength specialist Tommy Stevenson. McShane said in 2021 he thought Tyrone should be competing at a higher level in hurling; in the 2022 season, Tyrone's hurlers secured promotions in both the league and the championship, topping Division 3A and winning the Nicky Rackard Cup.

Tyrone have the following achievements in hurling.

=== National ===
- Christy Ring Cup
  - 4th place (1): 2024
- Nicky Rackard Cup
  - (gold) Winners (2): 2014, 2022
  - (silver) Runners-up (1): 2021
- Lory Meagher Cup
  - (gold) Winners (2): 2009, 2012
  - (silver) Runners-up (1): 2011
- All-Ireland Minor C Hurling Championship
  - (gold) Winners (2): 1990, 2010

=== Provincial ===
- Ulster Senior Hurling Championship
  - Second round (2): 2008, 2010
- Ulster Senior Hurling Shield
  - (silver) Runners-up (1): 2017
- Ulster Junior Hurling Championship
  - (gold) Winners (3): 1995, 1996, 1999
  - (silver) Runners-up (2): 1951, 1993

=== Leagues ===
- National Hurling League Division 3A
  - (gold) Winners (1): 2015, 2022
- National Hurling League Division 4
  - (gold) Winners (1): 2011
- National Hurling League Division 3B
  - (gold) Winners (1): 2014
- National Hurling League Division 3 Shield
  - (gold) Winners (1): 2006

== Camogie ==
Camogie peaked in Tyrone with the run of Eglish to the 1991 All-Ireland Senior Club Camogie Championship final. Led by the Jordan sisters, they pulled off two of the shocks of the century in defeating Loughgiel in the Ulster final by 3–7 to 2–4 and then defeating Celtic of Dublin in the All-Ireland semi-final, but lost the final heavily against Mullagh from Galway.

Tyrone qualified for the All Ireland junior final of 1980 against Cork, defeating Armagh, Antrim and Louth in their path to the final. Ursula Jordan was the outstanding player of the era and in the history of camogie in the county, and was selected for Ulster's Gael Linn Cup inter-provincial team. Ann Jordan, Sheila Burke and Paula Vallely were other notable players from the 1980s. Vera Campbell refereed the All Ireland senior finals of 1939, 1940 and 1943.

Tyrone won the Máire Ní Chinnéide Cup in 2008 and the fourth division of the National Camogie League in 2010.

Under Camogie's National Development Plan 2010–2015, "Our Game, Our Passion", five new camogie clubs were established in the county in 2015.

== Ladies' football ==
Tyrone have the following achievements in Ladies Football.

=== National ===
All-Ireland Senior Ladies' Football Championship

- (silver) Runners Up (2010)

All-Ireland Intermediate Ladies' Football Championship

- (gold) Winners (2018, 2025)
- (silver) Runners Up (2017, 2024)
