= Atwar Bahjat =

Iraqi journalist (1976–2006)

- Born: 7 June 1976; Samarra, Iraq
- Died: 22 February 2006 (aged 29); Samarra, Iraq
- Occupation: journalist
- Organization(s): Al Jazeera, Al Arabiya
- Known for: television journalism, 2006 murder
- Awards: CPJ International Press Freedom Award (2006); Louis Lyons Award (2006)

Atwar Bahjat (Arabic: أطوار بهجت, romanized: Aṭwār Bahjat; 7 June 1976 – 22 February 2006) was an Iraqi journalist. Initially a reporter for Iraq's state-controlled television under Saddam Hussein, Bahjat became a popular television correspondent for al-Jazeera and later al-Arabiya following the US invasion of Iraq. On 22 February 2006, Bahjat was shot dead along with her colleagues Adnan Al Dulaimi and Khalid Al Fellahi while covering a story in Samarra.

== Life and career ==
Bahjat was born in Samarra. Her mother was a Shia and her father a Sunni. Bahjat began her career working as a reporter in the culture department at Iraqi Satellite Television during the rule of Saddam Hussein.

Following the US invasion of Iraq, she began work at al-Jazeera. Initially assigned to culture stories, she persisted in her reporting and was eventually assigned to political coverage of the Governing Council. She was the first to report from the scene about the 2003 looting of the National Museum of Iraq. On another occasion, she was detained overnight by the US military. She later persuaded her editors to send her to cover the 2004 fighting in Najaf, broadcasting live shots from rooftops even after the killing of her colleague Rasheed Wali on a rooftop by US military gunfire.

In the last three weeks of her life she became a television reporter for al-Arabiya. Prior to her death, she was one of the best-known television journalists in the country.

== Murder ==
On 22 February 2006, the Shia Al Askari Mosque in Samarra was hit by a bomb attack, which triggered waves of retaliatory violence between Sunnis and Shias. Bahjat persuaded her editors to let her travel to the scene.

Bahjat and a four-man crew were broadcasting outside of Samarra, surrounded by a crowd of civilians when, according to the sole survivor of the team, two gunmen arrived in a pickup truck and fired shots in the air, chasing away the crowd. One of the attackers shouted, "We want the correspondent" and the two began immediately firing on the journalists who fled as they were being shot at with heavy gunfire.

The official government story of what happened next and who the perpetrators were has changed three times in the last decade and is fiercely contested by both Atwar's family and the families of her colleagues. According to the government's official story Bahjat, Al Dulaimi and Al Fellahi were then abducted by three Sunni brothers—Yasser, Abdallah and Mohsen al-Takhi— and driven to a side street, where Mohsen and Abdallah shot Mahmoud and Khairallah, and Yasser raped and shot Bahjat. The bodies were found later that day. The victims' families, who retrieved the bodies from Samarra and interviewed the sole survivor and local police, say the government's account is contradicted by eyewitnesses and medical reports, they state categorically that Atwar was not raped, and say the tragedy is being politicized to further divide Iraq.

On 25 February, Atwar's funeral procession was attacked twice, first by gunmen who opened fire on Interior Ministry Commandos accompanying the procession, and later by a roadside bomb targeting the Commandos as the funeral cortege returned from the cemetery. At least three security personnel were killed in the attacks while four people were injured.

== Investigation ==
On 7 May 2006, the British Sunday Times published an article by Hala Jaber, in which she describes watching a video of Bahjat being stripped of her clothing and beheaded. The video was later proven to show the murder of a Nepalese man by The Army of Ansar al-Sunna in August 2004. On 28 May 2006 The Sunday Times retracted the story, saying it had been the victim of a hoax.

In 2009, Yasser al-Takhi was captured along with his brothers and forced to make a videotape confession to Bahjat's rape and murder which was then broadcast on Iraqi Television. He was sentenced to death by hanging in a trial criticized by Amnesty International as falling short of international standards given the Iraqi government's routine use of torture to extract confessions. On 16 November 2011 Al Takhi was hanged.

== Posthumous recognition ==
In 2006, the Committee to Protect Journalists posthumously awarded an International Press Freedom Award to Bahjat. Bahjat was also recognized posthumously by the Nieman Foundation for Journalism of Harvard University, which awarded her its Louis Lyons Award.

Megan K. Stack's Every Man in This Village Is a Liar: An Education in War, a finalist for the 2010 National Book Award for Nonfiction, has a section devoted to Bahjat.
