= All-Ireland Under-20 B Hurling Championship =

GAA Hurling All-Ireland Under-20 B Championship
- Current season or competition: 2026 All-Ireland Under-20 B Hurling Championship
- Irish: Craobh Iomána Fé-20 B na hÉireann
- Code: Hurling
- Founded: 1998
- Region: Ireland (GAA)
- Trophy: Richie McElligott Cup
- No. of teams: 6
- Title holders: Derry (2nd title)
- First winner: Kerry
- Most titles: Kerry (10 titles)
- Sponsors: Bord Gáis Energy
- TV partner: TG4
- Official website: http://www.gaa.ie/

The GAA Hurling All-Ireland Under-20 (previously Under-21) B Championship, the second tier competition in hurling is an annual series of games for male players under the age of 20 and is organized by the Gaelic Athletic Association (GAA). The 2019 competition was the first at the Under 20 age level.

The final is currently played in April or May and the winning county receives the Richie McElligott Cup, which is named in honour of the late great Kerry stalwart Richie McElligott of the Lixnaw club and was first presented in 2015. The 2020 competition was not held due to the COVID-19 pandemic, but otherwise has been held every year since.

The championship is played on a straight knockout basis whereby once a team loses they are eliminated.

Teams that are deemed ineligible or "too weak" for the GAA Hurling All-Ireland Under-20 Championship participate in the B championship. It is one of the few All-Ireland championships not to be run on a provincial basis.

Derry are the current holders having beaten Roscommon in the 2026 final at Breffni Park, on a 1-17 to 1-11 scoreline. It is Derry's second at this grade, and second in four years.

== Teams ==
=== 2026 Championship ===
Six counties will compete in the 2026 All-Ireland Under-20 B Hurling Championship.

County	Stadium	Province	Position in 2025 Championship	Championship Titles	Last Championship Title
Derry	Celtic Park	Ulster	Semi-Finals	1	2023
Donegal	MacCumhaill Park	Ulster	Quarter-Finals	0	—
Mayo	MacHale Park	Connacht	Quarter-Finals	0	—
Roscommon	Dr Hyde Park	Connacht	Quarter-Finals	2	2012
Tyrone	Healy Park	Ulster	Runners-up	0	—
Wicklow	Aughrim County Ground	Leinster	Semi-Finals	1	2015

== List of Finals ==
=== List of All-Ireland Finals ===
Year	Date	Winners		Runners-up		Venue	Winning captain(s)	Winning margin
Year	Date	County	Score	County	Score	Venue	Winning captain(s)	Winning margin
2026	2 May	Derry	1-17	Roscommon	1-11	Breffni Park, Cavan		6
2025	3 May	Down	1-22	Tyrone	4-11	Breffni Park, Cavan		2
2024	25 May	Down	0-20	Roscommon	0-11	Croke Park	Michael Dorrian	9
2023	6 May	Derry	3-17	Roscommon	2-14	Croke Park	Keelen Doherty	6
2022	30 April	Down	2-15	Roscommon	0-15	Breffni Park, Cavan	Lukas Boyd	6
2021	11 August	Meath	2-19	Derry	0-19	Páirc Esler, Newry	Cian Kelly	6
2020	No championship							
2019	3 August	Kerry	3-22	Down	0-12	Páirc Tailteann, Navan	Adam O'Sullivan	19
2018	4 August	Kerry	2-20	Derry	0-11	Nowlan Park, Kilkenny	Jason Diggins	15
2017	9 September	Kerry	2-12	Wicklow	2-08	Semple Stadium	Darragh Shanahan	4
2016	10 September	Meath	1-20	Mayo	0-15	Semple Stadium	Jack Regan	8
2015	12 September	Wicklow	2-17	Meath	2-15	Semple Stadium	Gavin Weir	2
2014	13 September	Kildare	1-14	Roscommon	1-11	Semple Stadium	Gerry Keegan	3
2013	14 September	Kerry	1-21	Kildare	4-10	Semple Stadium	Brendan O'Leary	2
2012	15 September	Roscommon	3-17	Kildare	3-16	Semple Stadium	Peter Kellehan	1
2011	10 September	Kerry	0-16	Westmeath	1-09	Semple Stadium	Jason Bowler	4
2010	11 September	Kerry	0-22	Meath	0-12	Semple Stadium	Shane Nolan	10
2009	12 September	Kerry	2-18	Roscommon	1-15	Cusack Park, Ennis	Alan Kelly	6
2008	13 September	Carlow	2-14	Kerry	0-07	MacDonagh Park, Nenagh		13
2007	5 August	Roscommon	0-13	Kerry	0-08	Semple Stadium	Michael Kelly	5
2006	22 July	Laois	6-10	Mayo	1-11	Athleague, County Roscommon		14
2005	10 September	Meath	1-17	Kerry	0-16	MacDonagh Park, Nenagh		4
2004	3 July	Laois	5-18	Donegal	0-08	Páirc Seán Mac Diarmada, Carrick-on-Shannon	James Walsh	25
2003	23 August	Westmeath	3-10	Mayo	0-11	Dr. Hyde Park, Roscommon	Brendan Murtagh	8
2002	24 August	Kerry	3-16	Carlow	2-10	Semple Stadium	Garry O'Brien	9
2001	28 October	Kerry	0-12	Carlow	0-10	Tipperary, County Tipperary	David Slattery	2
2000	7 August	Westmeath	3-19	Kerry	4-15	MacDonagh Park, Nenagh		1
1999	21 August	Meath	3-10	Kerry	2-11	Toomevara, County Tipperary		2
1998	30 August	Kerry	3-09	Kildare	0-17	Croke Park	Willie Joe Leen	1

== Roll of Honour ==
=== Performance by County ===
#	Team	Wins	Years won
1	Kerry	10	1998, 2001, 2002, 2009, 2010, 2011, 2013, 2017, 2018, 2019
2	Meath	4	1999, 2005, 2016, 2021
3	Down	3	2022, 2024, 2025
4	Westmeath	2	2000, 2003
4	Laois	2	2004, 2006
4	Roscommon	2	2007, 2012
4	Derry	2	2023, 2026
8	Carlow	1	2008
8	Kildare	1	2014
8	Wicklow	1	2015

=== Performance by Province ===
#	Province	Titles	Most recent year won
1	Leinster	11	2021
2	Munster	10	2019
3	Ulster	5	2026
4	Connacht	2	2012

== Team Records and Statistics ==
=== By Decade ===
The most successful team of each decade, judged by number of All-Ireland titles, is as follows:

- 1990s: 1 for Kerry and Meath
- 2000s: 3 for Kerry
- 2010s: 6 for Kerry
- 2020s: 2 for Down

== See also ==
- All-Ireland Under-20 Hurling Championship (Tier 1)
- All-Ireland Under-20 C Hurling Championship (Tier 3)
