= All-Ireland Under-20 C Hurling Championship =

GAA Hurling All-Ireland Under-20 C Championship
- Current season or competition: 2026 All-Ireland Under-20 C Hurling Championship
- Irish: Craobh Iomána Fé-20 C na hÉireann
- Code: Hurling
- Founded: 2015
- Region: Ireland (GAA)
- Trophy: Andrew O'Neill Cup
- No. of teams: 7
- Title holders: Armagh (2nd title)
- First winner: Donegal
- Most titles: Donegal (3 titles)
- Sponsors: Fulfil
- TV partner: TG4
- Official website: http://www.gaa.ie/

The GAA Hurling All-Ireland Under-20 (previously Under-21) C Championship, the third tier competition in hurling is an annual series of games for male players under the age of 20 and is organized by the Gaelic Athletic Association (GAA). The 2024 competition was the first at the Under 20 age level.

The final is currently played in early May and the winning county receives the Andrew O'Neill Cup, a young hurler from the Naomh Colm Chille club in Clonoe, Co. Tyrone who died tragically in Liverpool in 2010 and was first presented in 2015.

The championship is played on a straight knockout basis whereby once a team loses they are eliminated.

Teams that are deemed ineligible or "too weak" for the All-Ireland Under-20 Championship and the All-Ireland Under-20 B Championship participate in the C championship. It is one of the few All-Ireland championships not to be run on a provincial basis.

Armagh are the current holders having beaten Fermanagh in the 2026 Final at Breffni Park, on a 2-17 to 0-13 scoreline.

== Teams ==
=== 2026 Championship ===
Seven counties will compete in the 2026 All-Ireland Under-20 C Hurling Championship.

County	Stadium	Province	Position in 2025 Championship	First year in championship	Championship Titles	Last Championship Title
Armagh	Athletic Grounds	Ulster	Champions	2025	1	2025
Cavan	Breffni Park	Ulster	Quarter-Finals	2015	0	—
Fermanagh	Brewster Park	Ulster	Quarter-Finals	2015	0	—
Leitrim	Páirc Seán Mac Diarmada	Connacht	Quarter-Finals	2024	1	2024
Louth	Drogheda Park	Leinster	Semi-Finals	2015	0	—
Monaghan	St Tiernach's Park	Ulster	Runners-Up	2015	0	—
Sligo	Markievicz Park	Connacht	Quarter-Finals (Under-20 B)	2015	0	—

== List of Finals ==
=== List of All-Ireland Finals ===
Year	Date	Winners		Runners-up		Venue	Winning captain(s)	Winning margin
Year	Date	County	Score	County	Score	Venue	Winning captain(s)	Winning margin
2026	2 May	Armagh	2-17	Fermanagh	0-13	Breffni Park		10
2025	3 May	Armagh	2-21	Monaghan	1-10	Breffni Park	Liam Farrell	14
2024	25 May	Leitrim	0-17	Monaghan	0-17	Breffni Park	Brian Goldrick and Dylan McDermott	0 (Note: Score was 0-17 - 0-17 after extra time. Leitrim won the penalty shoot-out 2–1.)
2023	No Championship							
2022	No Championship							
2021	No Championship							
2020	No Championship							
2019	No Championship							
2018	No Championship							
2017	22 July	Donegal	1-14	Sligo	0-12	Markievicz Park		5
2016	23 July	Donegal	3-07	Fermanagh	1-02	Healy Park		11
2015	26 July	Donegal	1-11	Tyrone	0-11	Celtic Park		3

== Roll of Honour ==
=== Performance by County ===
County	Title(s)	Runners-up	Winning years	Losing years
Donegal	3	0	2015, 2016, 2017	—
Armagh	2	0	2025, 2026	—
Leitrim	1	0	2024	—
Monaghan	0	2	—	2024, 2025
Fermanagh	0	2	—	2016, 2026
Tyrone	0	1	—	2015
Sligo	0	1	—	2017

=== Performance by Province ===
Province	Title(s)	Runners-up	Total
Ulster	5	5	10
Connacht	1	1	2
Leinster	0	0	0
Munster	0	0	0

== Team Records and Statistics ==
=== By Decade ===
The most successful team of each decade, judged by number of All-Ireland titles, is as follows:

- 2010s: 3 for Donegal
- 2020s: 2 for Armagh

== See also ==
- All-Ireland Under-20 Hurling Championship (Tier 1)
- All-Ireland Under-20 B Hurling Championship (Tier 2)
