= Edwin A. Lahey =

20th-century American journalist

- Born: Edwin Aloysius Lahey; November 1, 1902; Chicago, Illinois, US
- Died: July 17, 1969 (aged 66); Washington, D.C., US
- Occupation: Journalist
- Employer(s): Chicago Daily News, Knight Newspapers
- Spouse: Grace Seidcheck
- Parent(s): Alice Burns, James F. Lahey
- Awards: Nieman Fellowship, Elijah Parish Lovejoy Award

Edwin A. Lahey (1902–1969) was an American journalist, known for his coverage of Al Capone and John Dillinger, the labor beat, and personal knowledge of Philip Murray, Lee Pressman, James Carey, John L. Lewis, Robert A. Taft, and Thomas E. Dewey. US Representative William H. Ayres called him "a crusader for all of us in these United States of America," while Knight Newspapers's John S. Knight, called him "the best newspaper reporter in my profession."

== Background ==
Edwin Aloysius Lahey was born on January 11, 1902, in Chicago. His parents were Alice Burns and machinist James F. Lahey. He dropped out of school at an early age, possibly by fourth grade.

== Career ==
Lahey as an office boy, shipping clerk, railroad yard clerk, and dishwasher. In 1927, he joined The Glen Ellyn, Illiniois, Beacon, followed by The East St. Louis Journal and Associated Press.

=== Chicago ===
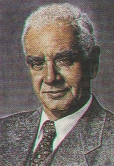
Lahey first met CIO leader Philip Murray during labor strikes in the late 1930s

In 1929, he joined Chicago Daily News, which he later said was "the only paper I ever wanted to work."

In 1936, the Chicago Daily News assigned Lahey to the labor beat. In 1937, he covered sit-down strikes in the Automobile and Steel industries. These included the Little Steel Strike. In 1959, Lahey recalled for oral history:

In my association with the C.I.O., which was very, very close and intimate, more so than—I'm not immodest when I say so, but I was closer to the operation of the C.I.O. than most of the people in the C.I.O., not to mention the newspapermen, because my best friends after I moved to Washington, were Philip Murray, the president of the C.I.O., and Lee Pressman, the general counsel of the C.I.O.

Shortly after a Nieman Fellowship at Harvard 1939, Lahey investigated an Illinois state auditor, which resulted in the official's imprisonment.

=== Washington ===
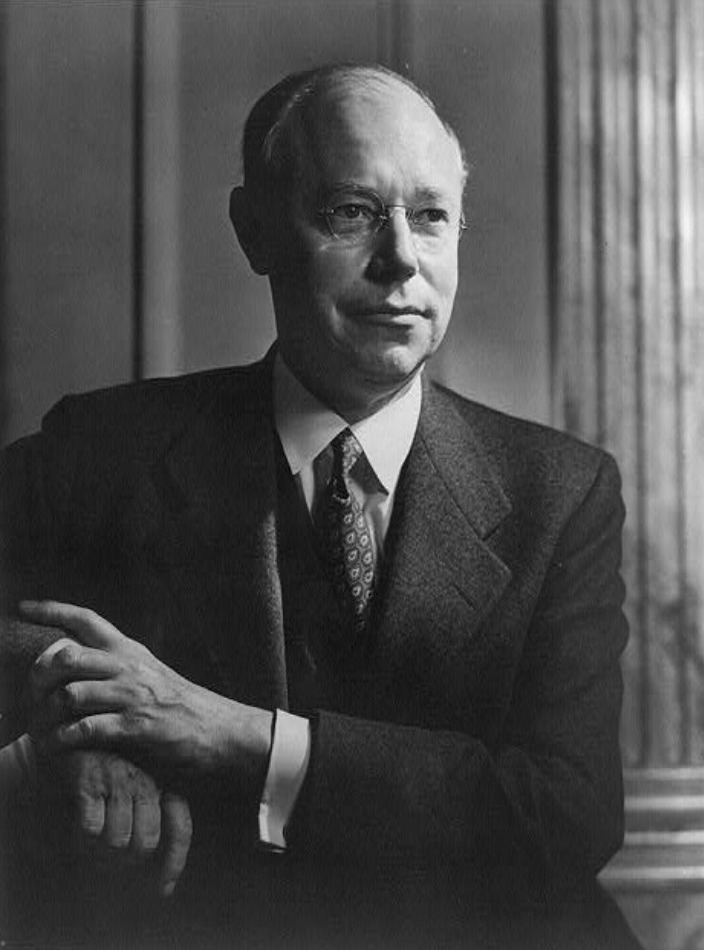
Lahey's reportage helped reconcile Robert A. Taft (here) with Dwight D. Eisenhower during the 1952 Republican Party presidential primaries.

In 1941, the Chicago Daily News assigned Lahey to Washington, DC. There, he met with Murray and Pressman twice a week.

During World War II, he covered first the China-Burma-India front and later Europe, Africa, and Latin America. In 1956, the Chicago Daily News made Lahey bureau chief there. In 1959, when Chicago Daily News sold to Marshall Field III, Lahey remained with Knight Newspapers as chief correspondent. He spent 28 years covering news in the nation's capital.

Famous stories include the resignation of Martin Durkin (former labor leader and President Dwight D. Eisenhower's first Secretary of Labor and an interview with US Senator Robert A. Taft (which led to reconciliation between Taft and Eisenhower following Taft's defeat for the 1952 Republican Party presidential primaries.

In 1951, during tense negotiations between Walter Reuther of the United Auto Workers and George Meany of the AFL–CIO, Lahey wrote, "the final act of complete labor unity awaits only the retirement or passing of three onetime cronies, Green, Murray, and John L. Lewis" and "competitive civil war" in labor organizing.

== Personal life and death ==
Lahey married Grace Seidcheck and had two children and several grandchildren.

He was a heavy drinker early but gave it up early and in 1940 joined Alcoholics Anonymous.

He was a member of the National Press Club, Harvard Club, and Gridiron Club.

He befriended Felix Frankfurter while a Nieman Fellow at Harvard.

Edwin A. Lahey died age 67 on July 17, 1969, of complications of emphysema at the Washington Hospital Center.

== Awards ==
- 1939: Nieman Fellowship for Journalism at Harvard University
- 1967: Elijah Parish Lovejoy Award, Colby College

== Legacy ==
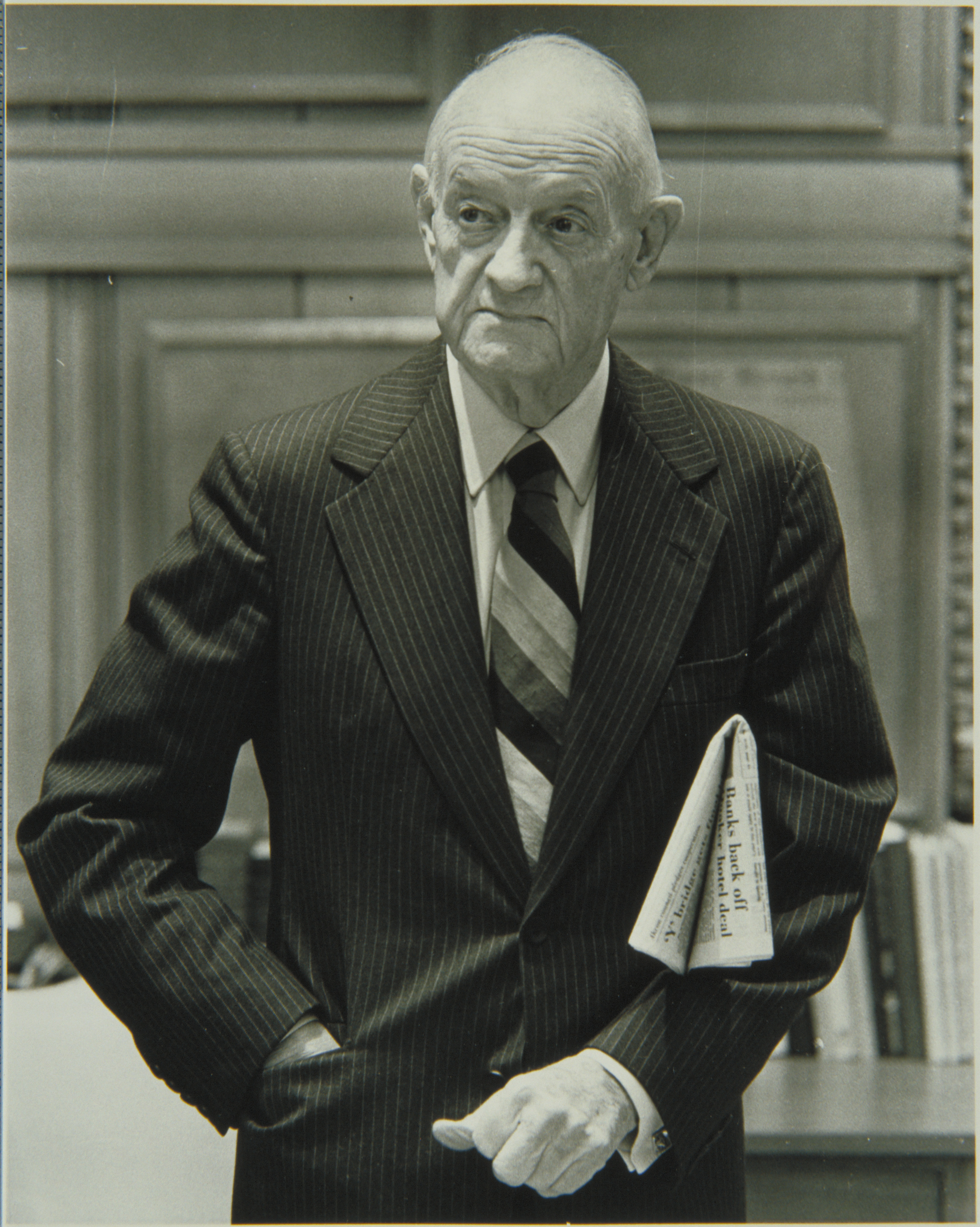
John S. Knight of Knight Newspapers called Lahey "the best newspaper reporter in my profession"

On July 22, 1969, US Representative William H. Ayres extolled Lahey before the United States House of Representatives. His last employer, John S. Knight, founder of Knight Newspapers said of him, "During my time as editor and publisher of the Chicago Daily News, the only man of whom I stood in awe was Ed Lahey, the best newspaper reporter in my profession."

In 1978, when the Chicago Daily News closed, the New York Times listed Lahey among the newspaper's top "reporting talent."

In 1996, the New York Times noted Lahey's reluctance to use news leaks: "The background interview is a vicious device because it lets officials escape responsibility."

In 2008, M. A. Lyons published a collection of writings by parent Louis M. Lyons, which included a chapter entitled, "Edwin A. Lahey: Chicago Daily News."

Lahey remains known for his sardonic summaries and statements:

- "Write for people who move their lips when they read."
- "Richard Loeb, who graduated with honors from college at the age of fifteen and who was a master of the English language, today ended his sentence with a preposition."

== Works ==
Articles:

- "Anything Can Happen in Chicago," The Nation (January 1, 1936)
- "What's Ahead for American Labor," The New Republic (July 26, 1943)
- "Is Pegler Right?" The New Republic (September 20, 1943)
- "The AFL and Lewis," The New Republic (February 7, 1944)
- "Bedaux and His Friends," The New Republic (March 6, 1944)
- "Fascism's Day in Court," The New Republic (June 5, 1944)
- "A Reporter at Bretton Woods," The New Republic (July 17, 1944)
- "Mayor Lausche of Cleveland," The New Republic (July 31, 1944)
- "The CIO Comes of Age," The New Republic (December 4, 1944)
- "Detroit's Got 'Em Again," The New Republic (October 1, 1945)
- "Reuther Takes Over," The New Republic (April 8, 1946)
- "Kefauver: Underworld Nemesis," The New Republic (February 19, 1951)
- "The Gangs Go Legitimate," The New Republic (May 14, 1951)
- "Fattening on Futures," The New Republic (May 21, 1951)
- "The AFL Will Absorb the CIO," Collier’s Magazine (September 1, 1951)
- "The Steelworkers State Their Case," The New Republic (May 26, 1952)
- "Ike: An Innocent at Home," The New Republic (June 30, 1952)
- "Labor, Adlai and Ike," The New Republic (August 25, 1952)
- "Perspective on Guatemala," The New Republic (July 19, 1954)
- "UAW Ties Stand For Annual Wage To Principle," Detroit Free Press (March 8, 1955)
- "Reuther Is Sure That He'll Win Wage Crusade," Detroit Free Press (March 9, 1955)
- "Industry's View On GAW Pact: It's Too Costly," Detroit Free Press (March 10, 1955)
- "Powerful Teamwork: Dulles Brothers Cope With Reds From Sunny, Dark Sides of Street," Chicago Daily News (October 6, 1955)
- "Right-to-Work Forces Outspent 3-1 by Labor," The Washington Post and Times-Herald (October 28, 1958)
- "–At the Cost of Only One U.S. Fighter," The Challenge of Ideas: An Essay Reader (1958)
- "Richard Nixon: An Obituary of a Career," Boston Globe (November 8, 1962)

Television, film:

- Meet the Press:
  - September 17, 1949
  - August 27, 1950
  - September 1, 1957
  - June 28, 1958
  - August 31, 1958
  - February 4, 1962
- The Press and the People on WGBH-TV (1958–1959)
- The Today Show (October 4, 1962)

Books, pamphlets:

- Memo to Congress : if you really want to cut the budget... with David J. Kraslow (1957)
