= Yury G. Kronn =

Soviet radio-physicist (1935–2021)

Yury Kronn, Ph.D.
- Yury Georgievich Khronopulo
- Born: April 22, 1935; Tashkent, Uzbekistan, Soviet Union
- Died: April 9, 2021 (aged 85); Eagle Point, Oregon, U.S.
- Citizenship: United States
- Education: Gorky State University
- Known for: Theory of Resonant Non-Linear Interaction of Light with Matter
- Scientific career
- Fields: Physics
- Thesis: Theory of Nonlinear Processes Wherein Laser Beams Interact with Matter (1967)
- Doctoral advisor: Rem Victorovich Khokhlov
- Other academic advisors: Maria Tikhonovna Grekhova

Yury Kronn (April 22, 1935 – April 9, 2021), was a Soviet-born American radio-physicist and academic. He is known for developing a theory of resonant non-linear interaction of light with matter, which was the basis for a physics text book, Resonant Nonlinear Interactions of Light with Matter.

In 1982, Kronn and ten other Russian dissidents organized a movement to foster trust and promote peace between the Soviet Union and the West. Kronn chaired the Disarmament Section of the first Moscow International Symposium for Humanitarian Problems in 1987.

In 2013, Kronn was appointed a faculty member of Quantum University in Honolulu, Hawaii, a school that is not accredited in the United States. Kronn died on April 9, 2021, at the age of 85. Later in 2022 after his death a book titled the Science of Subtle Energy was published writtten by Kronn.

== Soviet dissident activities ==
In June 1982, with ten other dissidents, Kronn helped organize the Group to Establish Trust Between the U.S. and the USSR, a non-official movement for trust and peace between the Soviet Union and the West.

The Trust Group avoided criticizing their own government's policies, both because they believed that criticism would generate opposition, and because it was illegal to do so. Instead, they suggested ways to improve relations between the superpowers based on the belief that improved trust could slow or stop the arms race. Their proposals included ideas for conversion of the military-industrial complexes on both sides by shifting to joint work on peaceful, humanitarian projects.

As a result of these and other actions, Soviet authorities applied pressure on Kronn. New York Times Moscow correspondent John F. Burns reported that Kronn, then known as Yury Khronopulo, had been warned at the institute where he was employed that he faced dismissal and possible prosecution for treason if his dissident activities continued.

In the summer of 1982, while an international peace march was taking place in Moscow, assault charges were fabricated against Kronn and an associate, Yuri V. Medvedkov. The two were arrested on July 16 and held in prison by the Soviet security department, the KGB, until July 31, 1982. Despite attempts to silence him, Kronn persisted with his unsanctioned political activities. In 1987 he chaired the Disarmament Section of the first Moscow International Symposium for Humanitarian Problems.

== Patents ==
Five patents have been granted to Kronn; four in the Soviet Union and one in the US:

- Method of Obtaining Holograms, USSR Patent No. 508142, (1975)
- Method of Transformation and Intensification of an Object's Image, USSR Patent No. 533254, (1976)
- A Method of Amplifying Superpower Laser Impulses, USSR Patent No. 2768756 (1979)
- A Method of Obtaining Light Impulses with a Steep Front, USSR Patent No.2876505 (1980)
- US patent 4933679, Khronopulo, Yury & Gorbusky, Philip, "Antenna", issued 12 June 1990
