= 2026 All-Ireland Under-20 Hurling Championship =

Irish hurling tournament

Championship Details
- Dates: 22 March - 31 May 2026
- Teams: 17

All Ireland Champions
- Winners: Clare (5th win)
- Captain: Eoghan Gunning
- Manager: Terence Fahy

All Ireland Runners-up
- Runners-up: Galway
- Captain: Donnacha Campbell
- Manager: Gavin Keary

Provincial Champions
- Munster: Clare
- Leinster: Galway
- Ulster: Antrim
- Connacht: Not Played

Championship Statistics
- Top Scorer: Fred Hegarty (2–56)

The 2026 All-Ireland Under-20 Hurling Championship was the eighth staging of the All-Ireland Under-20 Championship and the 63rd staging overall of a hurling championship for players between the minor and senior grades. The championship ran from 22 March to 31 May 2026.

Tipperary were the defending champions, however, they were beaten by Clare in the Munster final.

The All-Ireland final was played on 31 May 2026 at FBD Semple Stadium in Thurles, between Clare and Galway, in what was their first ever meeting in the final. Clare won the match by 4–20 to 2–16 to claim their fifth championship title overall and a first title in 12 years.

Clare's Fred Hegarty was the championship's top scorer with 2–56.

== Ulster Under-20 Hurling Championship ==
=== Ulster Group Stage ===
Pos	Team	Pld	W	D	L	SF	SA	Diff	Pts	Qualification
1	Antrim	5	5	0	0	145	48	+97	10	Advance to Final
2	Down	5	4	0	1	129	97	+32	8	Advance to Final
3	Tyrone	5	3	0	2	96	117	-21	6	
4	Derry	5	2	0	3	98	98	+0	4	
5	Donegal	5	0	1	2	67	117	-50	1	
6	Wicklow	5	0	1	4	74	132	-58	1	

Round 1

23 January 2026 Round 1	Derry	2-17 (23) – (24) 3-15	Tyrone	Derry
				Venue: Celtic Park
				Referee: James Connors

24 January 2026 Round 1	Wicklow	3-11 (20) – (20) 1-17	Donegal	Darver
				Venue: Darver Pitch 1
				Referee: Ruán McKinstry

25 January 2026 Round 1	Antrim	3-23 (32) – (13) 1-10	Down	Mallusk
				Referee: Tarlach Conway

Round 2

30 January 2026 Round 2	Donegal	1-12 (15) – (27) 5-12	Derry	Convoy
				Referee: James Clarke

31 January 2026 Round 2	Down	2-20 (26) – (18) 1-15	Wicklow	Newry
				Venue: Abbey CBS Newry
				Referee: David Hurson

2 February 2026 Round 2	Tyrone	0-06 (6) – (26) 3-17	Antrim	Garvaghey
				Referee: Peter Owens

Round 3

6 February 2026 Round 3	Derry	1-11 (14) – (19) 0-19	Antrim	Derry
				Venue: Find Insurance Celtic Park
				Referee: James Callaghan

7 February 2026 Round 3	Donegal	1-10 (13) – (22) 2-16	Down	Convoy
				Referee: Tarlach Conway

7 February 2026 Round 3	Tyrone	1-15 (18) – (17) 2-11	Wicklow	Garvaghey
				Referee: James Clarke

Round 4

15 February 2026 Round 4	Down	6-19 (37) – (21) 3-12	Tyrone
				Referee: Tarlach Conway

15 February 2026 Round 4	Antrim	2-15 (21) – (5) 0-05	Donegal	Cushendun
				Venue: Robert Emmets GAC
				Referee: Terence Masterson

15 February 2026 Round 4	Derry	1-18 (21) – (9) 1-06	Wicklow	Owenbeg
				Venue: Find Insurance Owenbeg
				Referee: John Dornan

Round 5

21 February 2026 Round 5	Down	2-25 (31) – (13) 0-13	Derry
				Referee: Colin Thompson

21 February 2026 Round 5	Antrim	8-23 (47) – (10) 0-10	Wicklow	Belfast
				Venue: Davitt Park
				Referee: Peter Owens

22 February 2026 Round 5	Tyrone	3-18 (27) – (14) 1-11	Donegal	Garvaghey
				Referee: John Dornan

=== Ulster Final ===
4 March 2026 Final	Antrim	3-25 (34) – (16) 2-10	Down	Belfast
				Venue: The Dub
	Pts: O McCallin 1-7 (0-4f), F Bradley & C Crawford 1-2 each; C Donnelly 0-3, T McLaughlin, C McAuley & J McAlonan 0-2 each; N Magee, O O’Connor, O McCamphill, R Fitzgerald & R McGarry 0-1 each	Report	Pts: B Taggart 2-0 (1-0f); C Coleman 0-9 (0-5f); R Breen 0-1	Referee: James Callaghan

Antrim advance to Leinster Phase 1.

== Leinster Under-20 Hurling Championship ==
=== Leinster Phase 1 ===
==== Round 1 ====
22 March 2026 Round 1	Meath	2-21 (27) – (20) 1-17	Antrim	Kilmessan
14:00
	Pts: L McIvor 0-11, K Ennis 1-4, J Christie 1-0, M Leavy and C Barron 0-2 each, F Conroy 0-1, P Jordan 0-1	Report	Pts: O McCallin 0-8, F Bradley 1-0, T McLoughlin 0-2, O O’Connor 0-2, C McAuley 0-1, C Mooney 0-1, L McEnhill 0-1, C Donnelly 0-1, O McCamphill 0-1

22 March 2026 Round 1	Kildare	2-24 (30) – (15) 0-15	Kerry	Hawkfield
16:00				Venue: Manguard Park
	Pts: O Byrne 0-7, T Power 0-6, M Kiernan 1-1, T Ryan 0-4, R Curran 1-0, T Boran 0-2, C Carroll 0-1, C Power 0-1.	Report

==== Round 2 ====
29 March 2026 Round 2	Meath	3-14 (23) – (9) 0-09	Carlow	Kilmessan
12:00
	Pts: L McIvor 0-5, K Ennis 1-2, P Jordan 1-1, J Christie 1-0, M Leavy and A Healy 0-2 each, D O’Higgins and C Barron 0-1 each	Report

29 March 2026 Round 2	Kildare	3-14 (23) – (17) 1-14	Westmeath	Hawkfield
16:00				Venue: Manguard Park
	Pts: T Power 0-7 (5f), C Carroll 1-2, M Kiernan, T Ryan 1-0 each, O O’Neill, T Boran 0-2 each, M Owens 0-1.	Report	Pts: K Loughlin 1-4 (all frees), R Williams 0-3, D Smith, C McKeogh 0-2 each, D Corrigan (f), D Kenny, C Ward 0-1 each.

=== Leinster Tier 1 ===
==== Leinster Tier 1 Group 1 ====
Pos	Team	Pld	W	D	L	SF	SA	Diff	Pts	Qualification
1	Galway	3	3	0	0	71	42	+29	6	Advance to Semi-Finals
2	Wexford	3	1	1	1	75	66	+9	3	Advance to Quarter-Finals
3	Kilkenny	3	1	1	1	62	55	+7	3	Advance to Quarter-Finals
4	Kildare	3	0	0	3	39	84	-45	0	

==== Leinster Tier 1 Group 1 Matches ====
Round 1

4 April 2026 Round 1	Kildare	0-10 (10) – (19) 1-16	Kilkenny	Hawkfield
14:00				Venue: Manguard Park
	Pts: T Power 0-8 (7 frees), T Ryan 0-1, O O'Neill 0-1.	Report	Pts: P Lacey 1-3 (3 frees), J Mullen 0-3, G Kelly 0-2, E Murphy 0-1, F Mahony 0-1, K Bubby 0-1, O O'Donovan 0-1, K Buggy 0-1, D Barcoe 0-1, C Donavan 0-1, E Lauhoff 0-1.

4 April 2026 Round 1	Wexford	1-08 (11) – (25) 4-13	Galway	Portlaoise
16:00				Venue: Laois Hire O'Moore Park
	Pts: S O'Brien 1-6, P Doyle 0-1, J Nolan 0-1.	Report	Pts: A Niland 3-8, H Holmes 1-0, B Callanan 0-2, D Counihan 0-2, C Leen 0-1.

Round 2

11 April 2026 Round 2	Kildare	0-09 (9) – (22) 1-19	Galway	Hawkfield
14:00				Venue: Manguard Park
	Pts: T Power 0-7 (6 frees), A Bell 0-1, O O'Neill 0-1.	Report	Pts: V Morgan 1-0, C Leen 0-4 (2 frees), B Callanan 0-3, L Kennedy 0-2, D Couninhan 0-2, S Moran 0-2, C Cahalan 0-2, M Burke 0-1, T Lohan 0-1, J Donnellan 0-1, J Shaughnessy 0-1 (free).

11 April 2026 Round 2	Kilkenny	1-18 (21) – (21) 2-15	Wexford	Kilkenny
13:30				Venue: UPMC Nowlan Park
	Pts: P Lacey (0-8, 7fs); J Mullen (0-4); O O'Donovan (1-0); G Kelly, K Buggy (0-2 each); E Lauhoff, E McDermott (0-1 each)	Report	Pts: D Ryan (0-7, 5fs); S O'Brien (1-1); C Fanning (1-0); J Nolan (0-2, 1f); C Carley, R Doran (0-2 each); R Shannon (0-1)

Round 3

22 April 2026 Round 3	Wexford	5-28 (43) – (20) 2-14	Kildare	Wexford
19:30				Venue: Chadwicks Wexford Park
	Pts: R Doran 2-5, S O'Brien 1-5 (0-1 frees), D Ryan 0-6 (0-3 frees, 1 x '65), D Daly O'Toole 1-2, J Nolan 0-4, (0-1 frees), T Dempsey 1-0, C Carley 0-3, R Shannon 0-1, P Doyle 0-1, C Fanning 0-1.	Report	Pts: T Power 1-9 (0-5 frees, 2 x '65), T Ryan 1-0, T Boran 0-1, M Kiernan 0-1, O Byrne 0-1, O Conaty 0-1, C Doolan 0-1.

22 April 2026 Round 3	Kilkenny	1-19 (22) – (24) 2-18	Galway	Portlaoise
19:30				Venue: Laois Hire O'Moore Park
	Pts: P Lacey 1-7, J Mullen 0-3, E Lauhoff 0-2, E McDermott 0-2, K Buggy 0-1, J Dollard 0-1, J Conlon 0-1, O O'Donovan 0-1, S Bergin 0-1.	Report	Pts: B Callanan, D Counihan (1-2 each); J Shaughnesy (0-4, 2fs); C Leen (0-3, 3fs); L Kennedy (0-3); J Donnellan (0-2); C Killeen, J Rabbitte (0-1 each)

==== Leinster Tier 1 Group 2 ====
Pos	Team	Pld	W	D	L	SF	SA	Diff	Pts	Qualification
1	Dublin	3	3	0	0	84	42	+42	6	Advance to Semi-Finals
2	Offaly	3	2	0	1	62	77	-15	4	Advance to Quarter-Finals
3	Laois	3	1	0	2	63	67	-4	2	Advance to Quarter-Finals
4	Meath	3	0	0	2	49	72	-23	0	

==== Leinster Tier 1 Group 2 Matches ====
Round 1

4 April 2026 Round 1	Dublin	3-15 (24) – (10) 0-10	Meath	Dublin
14:00				Venue: Parnell Park
	Pts: C Graham 2-0; D Kilduff 1-3 (0-1f); D O’Kelly (2f), A Gargan 0-3 each; R Duffy, F Murphy, M Tierney, C Dillon, H Curley (f), T Cullen 0-1 apiece.	Report	Pts: L McIvor 0-5 (3f, 1 ’65); M Leavy 0-3 (1f); C Barron, D O’Higgins 0-1 apiece.

4 April 2026 Round 1	Laois	2-16 (22) – (23) 1-20	Offaly	Portlaoise
14:00				Venue: Laois Hire O'Moore Park
	Pts: C Byrne 1-3 (2f)), E Murphy 0-4 (4f), J Duggan and E Delaney 0-3 each, C Headen 1-0, H Whelan, R Deegan and T Mahony 0-1 each.	Report	Pts: O Fletcher 0-6 (4f), M Mulrooney 0-5, S Carey and L O'Riordan 0-3 each, P Lyons 1-0, A Hogan (f), G Maher and C Egan 0-1 each.

Round 2

9 April 2026 Round 2	Meath	3-11 (20) – (24) 2-18	Offaly	Kildalkey
18:30
	Pts: L McIvor 1-8 (goal from a penalty and 5f), P Jordan and K Ennis 1-1 each, D O'Higgins 0-1.	Report	Pts: O Fletcher 0-8 (7f), L O'Riordan 1-2, A Hogan 0-3 (1f), P Lyons 1-1, M Mulrooney, G Maher, D Scully and S Carey 0-1 each.

11 April 2026 Round 2	Dublin	1-22 (25) – (17) 1-14	Laois	Dublin
14:00				Venue: Parnell Park
	Pts: D Kilduff 0-9 (7f); A Gargan 1-2; M Tierney, C Graham, D O’Kelly 0-2 each; F Donohoe (f), C O’Flynn, C Dillon, J Norris, J Sheppard 0-1 apiece.	Report	Pts: E Murphy 1-1 (1-0pen, 0-1f); C Byrne 0-4 (2f); H Whelan, E Delaney, T Mahony 0-2 each; R Deegan (sideline), D Deegan, J Duggan 0-1 apiece.

Round 3

22 April 2026 Round 3	Meath	2-13 (19) – (24) 2-18	Laois	Trim
18:30				Venue: St Loman's Park
	Pts: L McIvor 0-10 (0-9 frees, 0-1 65), J Christy 1-1, F Flynn 1-0, D O’Higgins and F Conroy 0-1 each.	Report	Pts: C Byrne 1-6 (0-3 frees), P O’Callaghan 1-0, E Murphy (0-1 free, 0-1 65) and J Duggan 0-3 each, R Kavanagh 0-2, J Kennedy, C Mortimer, H Whelan and C Headen 0-1 each.

22 April 2026 Round 3	Offaly	0-15 (15) – (35) 4-23	Dublin	Tullamore
18:30				Venue: Glenisk O'Connor Park
	Pts: O Fletcher (0-10, 0-6 frees, 0-1 '65'), D Scully (0-2), G Maher (0-2, 0-1 free), J O'Sullivan (0-1).	Report	Pts: D Kilduff (1-3), S Bolger (2-0), D O'Kelly (0-5, 0-4 frees, 0-1 '65'), T Cullen (1-1), C Graham, A Gargan, J Norris (0-3 each), M Tierney (0-2), C O'Flynn, L Hayes, G O'Toole (0-1 each).

=== Leinster Knockout Stage ===
Quarter-Finals; 4 May
Offaly	1-10
Kilkenny	5-23
Wexford	5-16
Laois	0-10

Semi-Finals; 13 May
Dublin	2-13
Kilkenny	1-22
Galway (a.e.t.)	2-23
Wexford	1-16

Leinster Final; 20 May
Kilkenny	2-11
Galway	2-20

==== Leinster Quarter-Finals ====
4 May 2026 Quarter-Final	Laois	0-10 (10) – (31) 5-16	Wexford	Portlaoise
14:00				Venue: Laois Hire O'Moore Park
	Pts: C Byrne 0-5 (0-3 frees), R Deegan and E Murphy 0-2 each, D Carroll 0-1 (65)	Report	Pts: S O’Brien 2-3 (0-1 free), J Nolan 0-6, R Shannon 1-1, T Dempsey and J Dunne 1-0 each, P Doyle 0-2, C Carley, O Moore, A O’Connell Byrne and C Mooney 0-1 each.

4 May 2026 Quarter-Final	Kilkenny	5-23 (38) – (13) 1-10	Offaly	Kilkenny
14:00				Venue: UPMC Nowlan Park
	Pts: P Lacey 3-5, R Sweeney 1-4 (2 x '65', 1 f), A Clifford 0-4, G Kelly 1-0, D Barcode 0-3, M Rohan and J Mullen 0-2 each, J Dollard, E Lauhoff and K Buggy 0-1 each	Report	Pts: S Carey 0-4, A Hogan 1-0 (penalty), O Fletcher and D Scully 0-2 each, M Mulrooney and L O'Riordan 0-1 each.

==== Leinster Semi-Finals ====
13 May 2026 Semi-Final	Dublin	2-13 (19) – (25) 1-22	Kilkenny	Dublin
19:30				Venue: Parnell Park
	Pts: D O’Kelly 0-6 (1f, 1 ’65); G O’Toole 1-1; L Hayes 1-0; A Gargan 0-3; J Kennedy, J Norris, T Cullen 0-1 apiece.	Report	Pts: P Lacey 1-10 (0-6f); E Lauhoff, K Buggy, J Mullen 0-2 each; D Vereker, J Conlon, J Dollard, G Kelly, E McDermott, R Sweeney 0-1 apiece.

13 May 2026 Semi-Final	Galway	2-23 (29) – (19) 1-16 (a.e.t.)	Wexford	Portlaoise
19:30				Venue: Laois Hire O'Moore Park
	Pts: C Leen (0-8, 0-5f 0-1 65), J Shaughnessy (0-7, 0-6 f); R Cahalan (1-1), B Callanan (1-0), J Rabbitte (0-3), D Counihan (0-2), T Blake (0-1), L Kennedy (0-1).	Report	Pts: S O’Brien (0-6, 0-5 f), R Doran (1-0), J Nolan (0-3, 0-2f); D Ryan (0-2, 0-2f), C Carley (0-2), D Daly O’Toole (0-1), R Donohue (0-1), C Fanning (0-1).

==== Leinster Final ====
20 May 2026 Final	Kilkenny	2-11 (17) – (26) 2-20	Galway	Portlaoise
19:35				Venue: Laois Hire O'Moore Park
	Pts: E Lauhoff 1-2, P Lacey 0-5 (3fs, 1 '65); R Sweeney 1-0, J Conlon 0-2, A Clifford, S Bergin 0-1 each.	Report	Pts: J Shaughnessy 1-7 (5f, 1 '65), V Morgan 1-0, B Callanan 0-3, C Leen 0-2 (1f), D Counihan, C Killeen, R Cahalan 0-2 each, J Rabbitte, M Burke 0-1 each.

=== Leinster Tier 2 ===
Pos	Team	Pld	W	D	L	SF	SA	Diff	Pts	Qualification
1	Carlow	4	3	0	1	91	73	+18	6	Qualify for Leinster Tier 2 Final
2	Antrim	4	3	0	1	110	69	+41	6	Qualify for Leinster Tier 2 Final
3	Kerry	2	1	0	1	38	43	-5	2	
4	Westmeath	3	1	0	2	64	58	+6	2	
5	Down	3	0	0	3	34	94	-60	0	

==== Leinster Tier 2 Matches ====
Round 1

4 April 2026 Round 1	Westmeath	1-12 (15) – (31) 3-22	Antrim	Mullingar
14:00				Venue: Dovida Lakepoint Park

5 April 2026 Round 1	Carlow	1-09 (12) – (23) 1-20	Kerry	Carlow
14:00				Venue: Netwatch Cullen Park

Round 2

8 April 2026 Round 2	Antrim	2-21 (27) – (16) 1-13	Down	Belfast
19:30				Venue: Pitch 10 Queens

Round 3

17 April 2026 Round 3	Carlow	0-20 (20) – (18) 0-18	Westmeath	Fennagh
19:30

Round 4

2 May 2026 Round 4	Antrim	3-22 (31) – (15) 0-15	Kerry	Ratheniska
14:00

2 May 2026 Round 4	Carlow	4-27 (36) – (11) 0-11	Down	Carlow
14:00				Venue: Netwatch Cullen Park

Round 5

9 May 2026 Round 5	Westmeath	5-16 (31) – (7) 1-04	Down	Mullingar
14:00				Venue: TEG Cusack Park

10 May 2026 Round 5	Carlow	3-14 (23) – (21) 1-18	Antrim	Carlow
11:45				Venue: Carlow Town Hurling Club

==== Leinster Tier 2 Final ====
20 May 2026 Final	Carlow	v	Antrim	TBC
TBC

== Munster Under-20 Hurling Championship ==
=== Munster Group Stage ===
Pos	Team	Pld	W	D	L	SF	SA	Diff	Pts	Qualification
1	Tipperary	4	3	0	1	92	72	+20	6	Advance to Final
2	Cork	4	3	0	1	99	85	+14	6	Advance to Semi-Final
3	Clare	4	3	0	1	79	78	+1	6	Advance to Semi-Final
4	Waterford	4	1	0	3	61	65	-4	2	
5	Limerick	4	0	0	4	70	101	-31	0	

==== Munster Group Stage Matches ====
Round 1

25 March 2026 Round 1	Clare	1-10 (13) – (12) 0-12	Waterford	Sixmilebridge
19:00				Venue: O'Garney Park
	Pts: F Hegarty 1-4 (4f); D Costelloe 0-2; D Moroney, R Hayes, J Mescall, R Kilroy 0-1 each.	Report	Pts: D Comerford 0-5 (3f, 1’65); S Mackey 0-4; G O’Shea, S Power, F Cooney 0-1 each.	Referee: Shane Scanlon (Cork)

25 March 2026 Round 1	Tipperary	1-21 (24) – (22) 0-22	Cork	Thurles
19:00				Venue: FBD Semple Stadium
	Pts: C Fitzpatrick 0-11 (0-8 f), S Tobin 0-6, J Ormond 1-0, O O’Donoghue 0-2, E Doughan, D Costigan 0-1.	Report	Pts: Barry Walsh 0-14 (0-13 f), Z Biggane, Johnny Murphy 0-2 each, B O’Flynn, F O’Brien, MT Brosnan, John Murphy 0-1 each.	Referee: Nicky O'Toole (Waterford)

Round 2

1 April 2026 Round 2	Cork	4-18 (30) – (21) 0-21	Limerick	Cork
19:00				Venue: SuperValu Páirc Uí Chaoimh
	Pts: Barry Walsh 2-9 (1-7 f, 1-0 penalty), B O’Flynn 1-2, Johnny Murphy 1-0, C Garde 0-2, MT Brosnan, C Noonan, Jack O’Brien, Z Biggane 0-1 each.	Report	Pts: H Flanagan 0-6 (0-4 f), D Ferland 0-4, E Brosnan, J O‘Connor, R O’Farrell, T Boddy 0-2 each, J Cosgrave, C Ryan, A O’Connell 0-1 each.	Referee: Alan Tierney (Tipperary)

1 April 2026 Round 2	Waterford	0-15 (15) – (16) 0-16	Tipperary	Dungarvan
19:00				Venue: Cappoquin Logistics Fraher Field
	Pts: D Comerford (0-6, 6 frees); M Hartley (1 free), C Tobin (0-3 each); G O’Shea (0-2); S Power (0-1).	Report	Pts: C Fitzpatrick (0-9, 6 frees, 1 65); J Ormond, S Tobin (0-2 each); S Cleary, O O’Donoghue, D Costigan (0-1 each).	Referee: Ciarán O'Regan (Cork)

Round 3

8 April 2026 Round 3	Clare	0-18 (18) – (15) 0-15	Limerick	Sixmilebridge
19:35				Venue: O'Garney Park
	Pts: F Hegarty 0-10 (7f); Jamie Moylan 0-2; Darren Moroney, Ronan Kilroy, Michael Collins, Graham Ball, Thomas O’Connor, Paul Rodgers 0-1 each.	Report	Pts: H Flanagan 0-9 (6f, 3’65); C Ryan, E Brosnan, M Fitzgerald, E Richardson, D Hurley, J O’Connor 0-1 each.	Referee: Ciarán O'Donovan (Tipperary)

15 April 2026 Round 3	Waterford	0-13 (13) – (16) 0-16	Cork	Dungarvan
19:35				Venue: Cappoquin Logistics Fraher Field
	Pts: D Comerford 0-5 (0-2 f), M Hartley 0-4, C Tobin 0-3, S Power 0-1.	Report	Pts: James O’Brien 0-10 (0-4 f, 0-1 65), B O’Flynn 0-2, Johnny Murphy, F O’Brien, C Noonan, C O’Sullivan 0-1 each.

Round 4

22 April 2026 Round 4	Tipperary	2-14 (20) – (21) 2-15	Clare	Thurles
19:00				Venue: FBD Semple Stadium
	Pts: C Fitzpatrick (1-6, 0-6 frees); J Ormond (0-4); T Ryan (1-0); C Ryan (0-2); S Cleary, S Tobin (0-1 each).	Report	Pts: D Costello (1-2); F Hegarty (0-5, 4 frees); M Cleary (1-0); M Collins (0-3); R Kilroy, S Boyce, T O’Connor, P Rodgers (free), S Arthur (0-1 each).

22 April 2026 Round 4	Limerick	1-17 (20) – (21) 1-18	Waterford	Limerick
19:00				Venue: TUS Gaelic Grounds
	Pts: H Flanagan 0-5 (3f); E Brosnan 1-2; Jack Cosgrove 0-3; M Fitzgerald 0-2 (1 s/l); R O’Farrell, D Gleeson, J Coughlan, D Ferland, P Kearney 0-1 each.	Report	Pts: D Comerford 0-10 (0-6 f; 1 ‘65); C Tobin 1-3; M Hartley 0-2; H Quann, J Power, G O’Shea 0-1 each.

Round 5

29 April 2026 Round 5	Cork	4-19 (31) – (27) 2-21	Clare	Cork
19:00				Venue: SuperValu Páirc Uí Chaoimh
	Pts: Barry Walsh 1-5 (0-1 f), James O’Brien 0-6 (0-5 f), Johnny Murphy 1-2, B O’Flynn, F O’Brien 1-0 each, Z Biggane 0-2, D Heavin, C Garde, Ben Walsh, C Noonan 0-1 each.	Report	Pts: F Hegarty 0-8 (0-5 f), T O’Connor 2-2, M Collins, R Kilroy 0-4 each, R Hayes, D Costello, P Rodgers 0-1 each.

29 April 2026 Round 5	Limerick	2-08 (14) – (32) 4-20	Tipperary	Limerick
19:00				Venue: TUS Gaelic Grounds
	Pts: R O'Farrell 0-4 (2f), J Cosgrove 1-0, D Ferland 1-0, J Coughlan 0-2 (2f), C Dennehy, E Brosnan 0-1 each	Report	Pts: C Fitzpatrick 1-9 (8f), D Costigan 2-2, J Ormond 1-3, S Cleary 0-2, R Ryan, S Tobin, E Doughan 0-1 each

=== Munster Knockout Stage ===
==== Munster Semi-Final ====
6 May 2026 Semi-Final	Cork	2-17 (23) – (29) 3-20	Clare	Cork
19:35				Venue: SuperValu Páirc Uí Chaoimh
	Pts: B O’Flynn 1-3, Johnny Murphy 1-2, James O’Brien 0-4 (0-1 f), Z Biggane, Barry Walsh (0-1 f) 0-2 each, D Heavin, C Noonan, F O’Brien, J Counihan 0-1 each.	Report	Pts: F Hegarty 0-8 (0-6 f), M Cleary 2-0, T O’Connor, R Kilroy 0-3 each, P Rodgers 1-0, D Costello 0-2, R Keane, M Collins, R Hayes, H Doherty 0-1 each.	Referee: Alan Tierney (Tipperary)

==== Munster Final ====
13 May 2026 Final	Tipperary	2-24 (30) – (30) 2-24 (a.e.t.) (3-4 pen)	Clare	Limerick
19:35				Venue: TUS Gaelic Grounds
	Pts: J Ormond (1-5); C Fitzpatrick (0-6, 0-5 frees); S Tobin (1-3); D Costigan (0-3); C Ryan, R Ryan (0-2 each); S Cleary, O O’Donoghue, E Doughan (0-1 each).	Report	Pts: F Hegarty (1-14, 1-0 pen, 0-11 frees); M Collins (0-3); M Cleary (1-0); D Costello, R Kilroy (0-2 each); T O’Connor, P Rodgers, S Arthur (0-1 each).
		Penalty shootout

== All-Ireland Under-20 Hurling Championship ==
=== All-Ireland Final ===
31 May 2026 Final	Clare	4-20 (32) – (22) 2-16	Galway	Thurles
14:00				Venue: FBD Semple Stadium
	Gls: F Hegarty (0-7, 0-3 frees, 0-1 ‘65); T O’Connor (2-0); M Cleary (1-2); J Moylan (1-1); P Rodgers (0-4, 0-1 sc); R Kilroy, M Collins (0-2); S Boyce, G Ball (0-1 each).	Report	Gls: B Callanan, J Rabbitte (1-2 each); J Shaughnessy (0-5, 0-3 frees, 0-1 ‘65); A Niland (0-4, 0-2 frees, 0-1 ‘65); M Burke, C Killeen, C Leen (0-1 each).

== Championship statistics ==
=== Top scorers ===
Rank	Player	County	Tally	Total	Matches	Average
1	Fred Hegarty	Clare	2-56	62	7	8.85
2	Patrick Lacey	Kilkenny	6-38	56	6	9.33
3	Cormac Fitzpatrick	Tipperary	2-41	47	5	9.40
4	Louis McIvor	Meath	1-39	42	5	8.40
5	Tom Power	Kildare	1-37	40	5	8.00
6	Barry Walsh	Cork	3-30	39	4	9.75
7	Seán O'Brien	Wexford	5-21	36	5	7.20
8	Jack Shaughnessy	Galway	1-24	27	6	4.50
9	Davy Comerford	Waterford	0-26	26	4	6.50
9	Odhran Fletcher	Offaly	0-26	26	4	6.50

== All-Ireland Under-20 'B' Hurling Championship ==
=== Knockout Stage ===
Quarter-Finals
29 March, Ballyforan
Roscommon	2-20
Mayo	3-11
29 March, Abbotstown
Tyrone	5-11
Wicklow	4-11

Semi-Finals
4 April, Owenbeg
Derry	1-19
Donegal	1-05
4 April, Garvaghey
Tyrone	1-18
Roscommon (a.e.t.)	5-10

All-Ireland U20 'B' Hurling Final
2 May, Cavan
Derry	1-17
Roscommon	1-11

==== 'B' Quarter-Finals ====
29 March 2026 Quarter-Final	Tyrone	5-11 (26) – (23) 4-11	Wicklow	Abbotstown
15:00				Venue: Abbotstown GAA CoE
				Referee: James Heavey

29 March 2026 Quarter-Final	Roscommon	2-20 (26) – (20) 3-11	Mayo	Roscommon
15:30				Venue: King & Moffatt Dr Hyde Park
				Referee: John Cahill

==== 'B' Semi-Finals ====
4 April 2026 Semi-Final	Derry	1-19 (22) – (8) 1-05	Donegal	Owenbeg
14:00				Venue: Find Insurance Owenbeg
				Referee: Barry Winters

4 April 2026 Semi-Final	Tyrone	1-18 (21) – (25) 5-10 (a.e.t.)	Roscommon	Garvaghey
14:00				Venue: Tyrone GAA COE
				Referee: Gerard McLaughlin

==== 'B' All-Ireland Final ====
2 May 2026 Final	Derry	1-17 (20) – (14) 1-11	Roscommon	Cavan
13:00				Venue: Kingspan Breffni
				TV: Spórt TG4

== All-Ireland Under-20 'C' Hurling Championship ==
=== Knockout Stage ===
Quarter-Finals
29 March, Cavan
Cavan	1-12
Fermanagh	3-12
28 March, Carrick-on-Shannon
Leitrim	1-11
Louth	1-10
29 March, Bekan
Sligo	0-03
Armagh	6-05

Semi-Finals
5 April, Castleblayney
Monaghan	0-11
Fermanagh	1-10
4 April, Carrick-on-Shannon
Leitrim	1-04
Armagh	1-14

All-Ireland U20 'C' Hurling Final
2 May, Cavan
Fermanagh	0-13
Armagh	2-17

==== 'C' Quarter-Finals ====
28 March 2026 Quarter-Final	Leitrim	1-11 (14) – (13) 1-10	Louth	Carrick-on-Shannon
11:30				Venue: Heartland Credit Union Páirc Seán MacDiarmada
				Referee: Aaron Clogher

29 March 2026 Quarter-Final	Cavan	1-12 (15) – (21) 3-12	Fermanagh	Cavan
11:00				Venue: Kingspan Breffni
				Referee: John Dornan

29 March 2026 Quarter-Final	Sligo	0-03 (3) – (23) 6-05	Armagh	Bekan
17:00				Venue: Connacht GAA CoE

==== 'C' Semi-Finals ====
4 April 2026 Semi-Final	Leitrim	1-04 (7) – (17) 1-14	Armagh	Carrick-on-Shannon
15:00				Venue: Heartland Credit Union Páirc Seán MacDiarmada

5 April 2026 Semi-Final	Monaghan	0-11 (11) – (13) 1-10	Fermanagh	Castleblayney
15:00				Venue: VBC Cloghan
				Referee: Liam Ilvenna

==== 'C' Final ====
2 May 2026 Final	Armagh	2-17 (23) – (13) 0-13	Fermanagh	Cavan
15:00				Venue: Kingspan Breffni
				TV: Spórt TG4
