= 2024 All-Ireland Under-20 B Hurling Championship =

- Dates: 30 March - 25 May 2024
- Teams: 8
- Sponsor: oneills.com
- Champions: Down (2nd title); Michael Dorrian (captain); Conor O'Prey (manager)
- Runners-up: Roscommon; James Dillon (captain); Kevin Sammon (manager)

Tournament statistics
- Matches played: 7
- Goals scored: 25 (3.57 per match)
- Points scored: 212 (30.29 per match)
- Top scorer(s): Paddy Fallon (1-21)

The 2024 All-Ireland Under-20 B Hurling Championship was the 26th staging of the All-Ireland Under-20 B Hurling Championship since its establishment by the Gaelic Athletic Association in 1998. The championship ran from 30 March to 25 May 2024.

Derry were the defending champions, however, they earned the right to take part in the Leinster Under-20 Championship after beating Antrim in the 2024 Ulster U20HC final.

The All-Ireland final was played on 25 May 2023 at Croke Park in Dublin, between Down and Roscommon, in what was their second meeting in the final overall and a first meeting in two years. Down won the match by 0-20 to 0-10 to claim their second All-Ireland title overall and a first title in two years.

Roscommon's Paddy Fallon was the championship's top scorer with 1-21.

== Results ==
=== Quarter-finals ===
30 March 2024 Quarter-final	Sligo	2-15 - 3-15	Roscommon	Markievicz Park
	R O'Kelly-Lynch 2-8, C Keenan 0-2, A Rolston 0-2, P O'Brien 0-1, D O'Brien 0-1, N Kelly 0-1.	Report	S Canning 1-8, P Fallon 1-4, G Mears 1-0, B Mannion 0-1, R Coyle 0-1, M Hussey 0-1.

30 March 2024 Quarter-final	Donegal	0-14 - 2-10	Mayo	O'Donnell Park
	B Gaffey 0-11 (8f, 1’65); D Tully 0-2; A McKinney 0-1.	Report	R Fallon 1-3; J Byrne 0-1; C Enright 1-5 (1f); S McGhee 0-1.

30 March 2024 Quarter-final	Down	7-19 - 0-07	Armagh	Páirc Tomás Ruiséil
	F Turpin 2-4, M Dorrian 2-2, N Rodgers 2-1, C O'Neill 0-4, B Christie 0-4, C Leneghan 1-0, T Connelly 0-3, D Mallon 0-1.	Report	R Monahan 0-3, M Rice 0-1, P Lynch 0-1, P McVerry 0-1, R Grimes 0-1.

30 March 2024 Quarter-final	Tyrone	0-13 - 5-17	Wicklow	Darver COE
	A Woods 0-8, L Hughes 0-3, C Bell 0-2.	Report	D Redmond 4-1, J O'Toole 1-7, C Byrne 0-2, L Kinsella 0-1, F Darcy 0-1, M Óg O'Neill 0-1, J Ffrench 0-1.

=== Semi-finals ===
5 May 2024 Semi-final	Wicklow	0-08 - 3-23	Down	Darver Centre of Excellence
	C Byrne (0-2, 1f); F D’Arcy (0-2), J O’Toole (0-2, 1 65, 1f), B Molloy (0-1, f); K Cullen (0-1); D Redmond (0-1).	Report	M Dorrian (1-3), B Christie (0-6, 1 65), F Turpin (1-2), F Gilmore (1-0), S McCarthy (0-3); N Rogers (0-2), C Leneghan (0-2), B Taggart (0-1), D Mallon (0-1), P Smyth (0-1, f); C O’Neill (0-1, f), R McCamphill (0-1).

6 May 2024 Semi-final	Mayo	1-10 - 2-30	Roscommon	Hastings MacHale Park
	C Enright (1-2), R Fallon (0-4f), K Gallagher (0-2), E Ryan (0-1); J Byrne (0-1).	Report	P Fallon (0-12, 0-5f, 0-1 sideline), S Canning (1-6), B Mannion (1-3), R Lyons (0-3), L Óg Coyle (0-3), K Ryan (0-1); M Hussey (0-1); G Meares (0-1).

=== Final ===
25 May 2024 Final	Down	0-20 - 0-11	Roscommon	Croke Park
	B Christie 0-6 (0-5f), M Dorrian 0-4, F Turpin 0-3, N Rogers 0-3, S McCarthy 0-2, P Smyth 0-1f, O Birt 0-1.	Report	P Fallon 0-5f, S Canning 0-3, R Conlon 0-1, R Coyle 0-1, T Fleming 0-1.	Referee: P Dunne (Laois)

== Championship statistics ==
=== Top scorers ===
Overall

Rank	Player	Team	Tally	Total	Matches	Average
1	Paddy Fallon	Roscommon	1-21	24	3	8.00
2	Seán Canning	Roscommon	2-17	23	3	8.00
3	Michael Dorrian	Down	3-09	18	3	6.00
3	Finn Turpin	Down	3-09	18	3	6.00
5	Ben Christie	Down	0-16	16	3	5.33
6	Dan Redmond	Wicklow	4-02	14	2	7.00
6	Robert O'Kelly-Lynch	Sligo	2-08	14	1	14.00
8	Colm Enright	Mayo	2-07	13	2	6.50
9	Noah Rogers	Down	2-06	12	3	4.00
9	Jack O'Toole	Down	1-09	12	2	6.00
