= Eisaya Hosuwan =

Thai actress and model (born 1996)

- อิษยา ฮอสุวรรณ
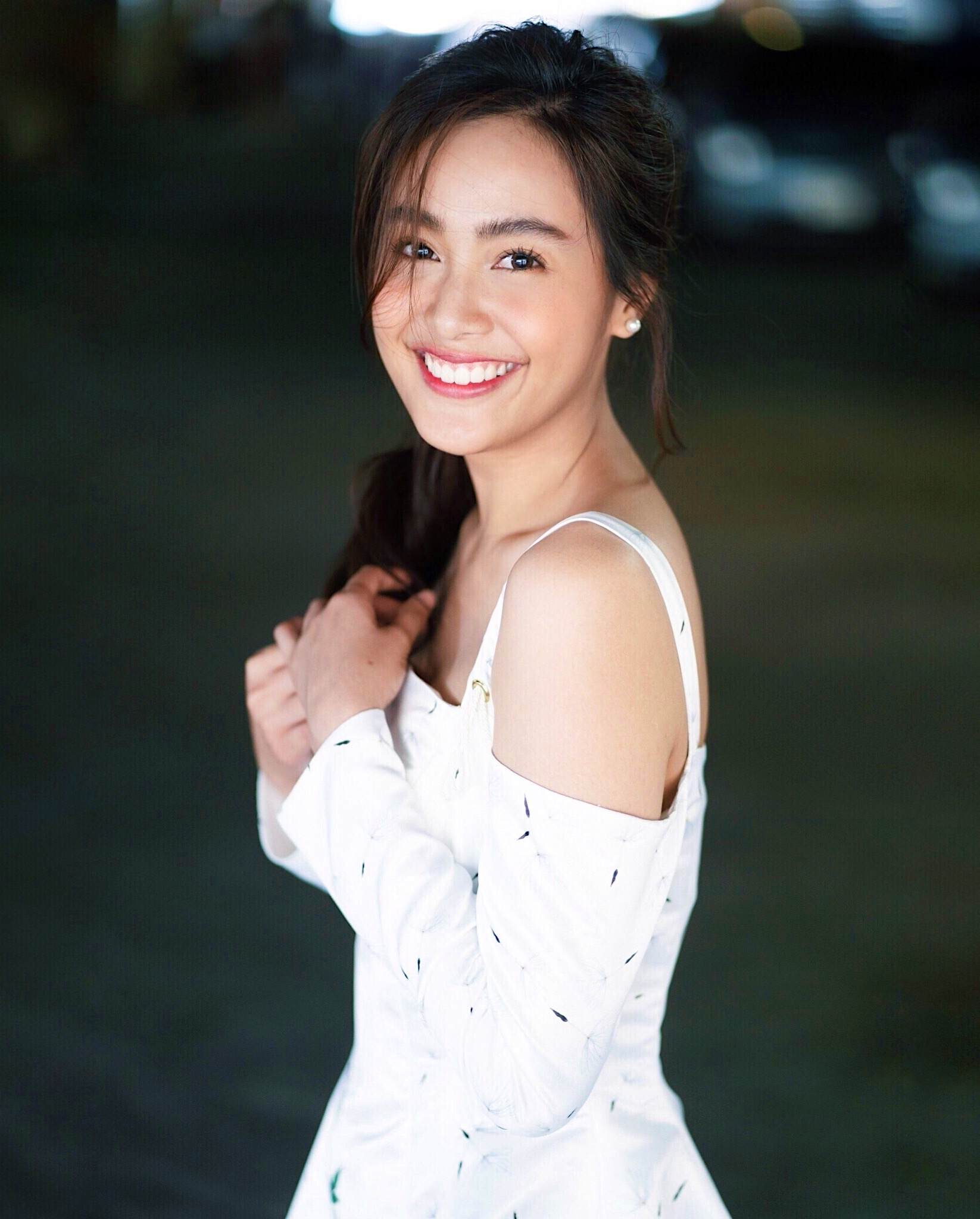
- Born: 4 July 1996 (age 30); Udon Thani, Thailand
- Other name: Oom (อุ้ม)
- Education: Silpakorn University Visual Communication Design
- Occupations: Actress; model
- Years active: 2015–present
- Notable work: Bad Genius, Jaiphisut, The Undertaker 2, Fulfill
- Height: 5 ft 5 in (1.65 m)

Eisaya Hosuwan (Thai) (born July 4, 1996), nicknamed Oom, is a Thai actress under Channel 3. She is known for her role as "Grace" from the film Bad Genius and the TV series Duangjai Dhevaprom, episode Jaiphisut. In 2026, She became a commercially successful leading actress after The Undertaker 2 grossed over 300 million baht at the box office. In total, she has appeared in three films that each surpassed 100 million baht in revenue, with her cumulative box office earnings exceeding 2.4 billion baht.

== Early life and education ==
Eisaya Hosuwan was born on July 4, 1996 in Nong Han District, Udon Thani Province. She is the youngest daughter with one older brother. She completed her secondary education at Satri Rachinuthit School and graduated with a bachelor's degree in the Faculty of Decorative Arts, Department of Visual Communication Design in Silpakorn University.

She entered the entertainment industry when she was in her 5th year of secondary school. She was invited by her manager who happened to meet her in Udon Thani Province. He then recommended that she try casting until she signed a contract to become an actress under Channel 3.

== Filmography ==
=== Film ===
Year	Title	Role
2017	Siam Square	May
2017	Bad Genius	Grace
2017	ของขวัญ ตอน เมฆฝนบนป่าเหนือ (Gift)	
2021	ส้ม ปลา น้อย (Som Pla Noi)	Som
2022	Faces of Anne	Anne
2023	The Murderer	Sai
2024	Haunted Universities	Koi
2026	The Undertaker 2	Khwan Khao
2026	Possessed	Nat

=== Television series ===
Year	Title	Role
2015	Tai Ngao Jan	Borana
2015	Miracle of Love Over the Horizon	Thara
2016	Duang Jai Pisuth	Dr. June
2017	Tieng Narng Mai	Vana
2019	The Man Series: Petch	Sirin / "Rin"
2020	Thung Saneha	Jinda
2020	Singha Na Ka	Cattleya
2021	Love Under the Moonlight	Khaohom
2022	อ้ายข่อยฮักเจ้า (Ai, Khoi Hak Jao)	Chattawa
2022	Spirits of the Mekong River	Buaphan (Princess Kaewbuathong)
2024	Dhevaprom: Jaipisut	"Nuphuk" Jaipisut Waithawi
2025	Stepmother	Miang
2026	Fulfill	Aioon
2026	THE RUNNING	Fueang
2026	Motherland	Punpatsa
2026	An Affair of Life	Phuangkaeo

== Music Video Appearance ==
Year	Song	Artist
2017	Love Is Now รักอยู่ตรงหน้า	เดอะทอยส์
2018	เสือหมอบ	สิงโต นำโชค
2019	NGÀY CHỜ THÁNG NHỚ NĂM THƯƠNG	OSAD
2020	ลบเลือน	Fool Step
2020	เป็นแฟนหรือแค่แทนเขา	นิว จิ๋ว,สิงโต ปราชญา
2026	โลกหลังความเศร้า (ost.The Undertaker 2)	โจอี้ ภูวศิษฐ์ Feat.ก้อง ห้วยไร่
2026	เธอคือโลกทั้งใบ (You are My World) (ost. FulFill รักเติมเต็ม)	Oom Eisaya

== Fan Meeting and Concert ==
Year	Title	Date	Place	
2024	ดวงใจเทวพรหม Sports Day รู้แพ้ รู้ชนะ รู้ใจคุณ	June 2	Union Hall ชั้น 6, Union Mall	-
2024	Dhevaprom Fan Con After Party	August 25	PARAGON HALL ชั้น 5, SIAM PARAGON	-
2025	OOMEISAYA B-DAY PARTY: Special Carbs Intake!	July 19	Union co-event studio, Union Mall	-
2025	Girls Cup Presented By มาม่า	August 30	Island Hall 3RD Floor, Fashion Island	-
2025	HER & HERS LINGORM 1st FANCON	November 8	IMPACT ARENA	Guest
2026	LENAMIU Born to Shine Fan Meeting	February 1	Phenix, Grand Ballroom	Guest
2026	Fulfill รักเติมเต็ม First Premiere with OomBam	April 24	Theater 13 Major Cineplex Ratchayothin	-
2026	OomBam First Fan Meeting in Taipei	May 3	Zepp New Taipei	-
2026	Fulfill รักเติมเต็ม Final Episode with OomBam	June 12	SiamPic Hall, Siam Square One	-
2026	OOM Eisaya Birthday Charity 2026	July 4	Tharnnukroh Foundation, Bang Khen Nursing Home for the Elderly	-
2026	Fansign Photobook Official OOMBAM “Blooming With You”	July 11	Maleenont Tower	-
2026	Girls Cup Presented By มาม่า	August 1	Bitec Live	-
2026	OomBam 1st Fansign in Shanghai	August 15	-	-

== Commercials ==
- Eversense UV Powder (2017)
- Sulwhasoo Snowise Brightening (2017)
- หมอนยางพารา “รอยัลออร์คิด" (2019)
- Vivo V20 Pro 5G (2020)
- Carebeauexpress (2021)
- Esteelauder Pure color Whipped Matte Lip Color (2021)
- Hada Labo น้ำตบสูตรเซรั่ม (2022)
- SB Design square ตู้เสื้อผ้า รุ่น Wardrobe Plus (2023)
- OSM Brand Ambassador in China (2026)

== Song ==
- เธอคือโลกทั้งใบ (You are My World) (ost. FulFill รักเติมเต็ม) Artist: Oomeisaya

== Awards and nominations ==
Year	Awards	Category	Result	Nominated work
2017	รางวัลชมรมวิจารณ์บันเทิง	Best Supporting Actress	Nominated	Bad Genius
2017	รางวัลภาพยนตร์แห่งชาติ สุพรรณหงส์ ครั้งที่ 27	Best Supporting Actress	Nominated	Bad Genius
2017	รางวัลภาพยนตร์แห่งชาติ สุพรรณหงส์ ครั้งที่ 27	Best Actress	Nominated	สยามสแควร์
2017	Kazz Awards 2017	Top Young Idols of the Year 2017	Nominated	-
2018	Thai Film Directors Association Awards 8	Best Actress	Nominated	สยามสแควร์
2018	Thai Film Directors Association Awards 8	Best Supporting Actress	Nominated	Bad Genius
2018	Daradaily Awards 2017	Rising Female Star of the Year	Won	เตียงนางไม้
2018	รางวัล Thailand Headlines Person Of The Year Awards 6	Culture and Entertainment Category	Won	Bad Genius
2018	รางวัลพระราชทานพระสุรัสวดี (รางวัลตุ๊กตาทอง) ครั้งที่ 31	Silver Doll Award for Outstanding Rising Actress	Won	สยามสแควร์ ฉลาดเกมส์โกง Bad Genius ของขวัญ ตอน เมฆฝนบนป่าเหนือ
2019	Kazz Awards 2019	Favorite Young Female Star of the Year 2019	Nominated	-
2020	Kazz Awards 2020	Hottest Young Female Star of the Year	Nominated	แก้วกลางดง
2020	Kazz Awards 2020	Favorite Young Female Star of the Year 2020	Nominated	-
2025	Thai Film Directors Association Awards 14	Best Actress	Nominated	เทอม 3
2025	ดาราอินไซด์ อวอร์ด (รางวัลนาคราช ครั้งที่ 7)	Best Actress	Won	Stepmother
2025	Lifestyle Asia Thailand 50 ICONS 2025	Entertainment Leaders	Won	-
2025	MAYA TV AWARDS 2025	Favorite Couple of the Year (ร่วมกับ เทศน์ เฮนรี ไมรอน)	Nominated	-
2026	SUPERSTAR IDOL AWARDS 2026	BEST ACTRESS OF THE YEAR (film)	Won	The Undertaker 2
2026	TCCANDLER TOP100 MOST BEAUTIFUL FACES OF 2026	The Most Beautiful Face	Nominated	-
2026	MAYA TV AWARDS 2026	Favorite Couple of the Year(ร่วมกับ สราลี ประสิทธิ์ดำรง)	Nominated	Fulfill
2026	Y Entertain Awards 2026	Best GL Series of the Year	Nominated	Fulfill
2026	Y Entertain Awards 2026	Rising Star Couple(ร่วมกับ สราลี ประสิทธิ์ดำรง)	Nominated	Fulfill
2026	FEED x KHAOSOD AWARDS 2026	BEST ACTRESS OF THE YEAR (film)	Nominated	Possessed
2026	The Viral Hits Awards 2026	GL Couple of the Year	TBA	Fulfill
