= Alfredo Corchado =

American journalist

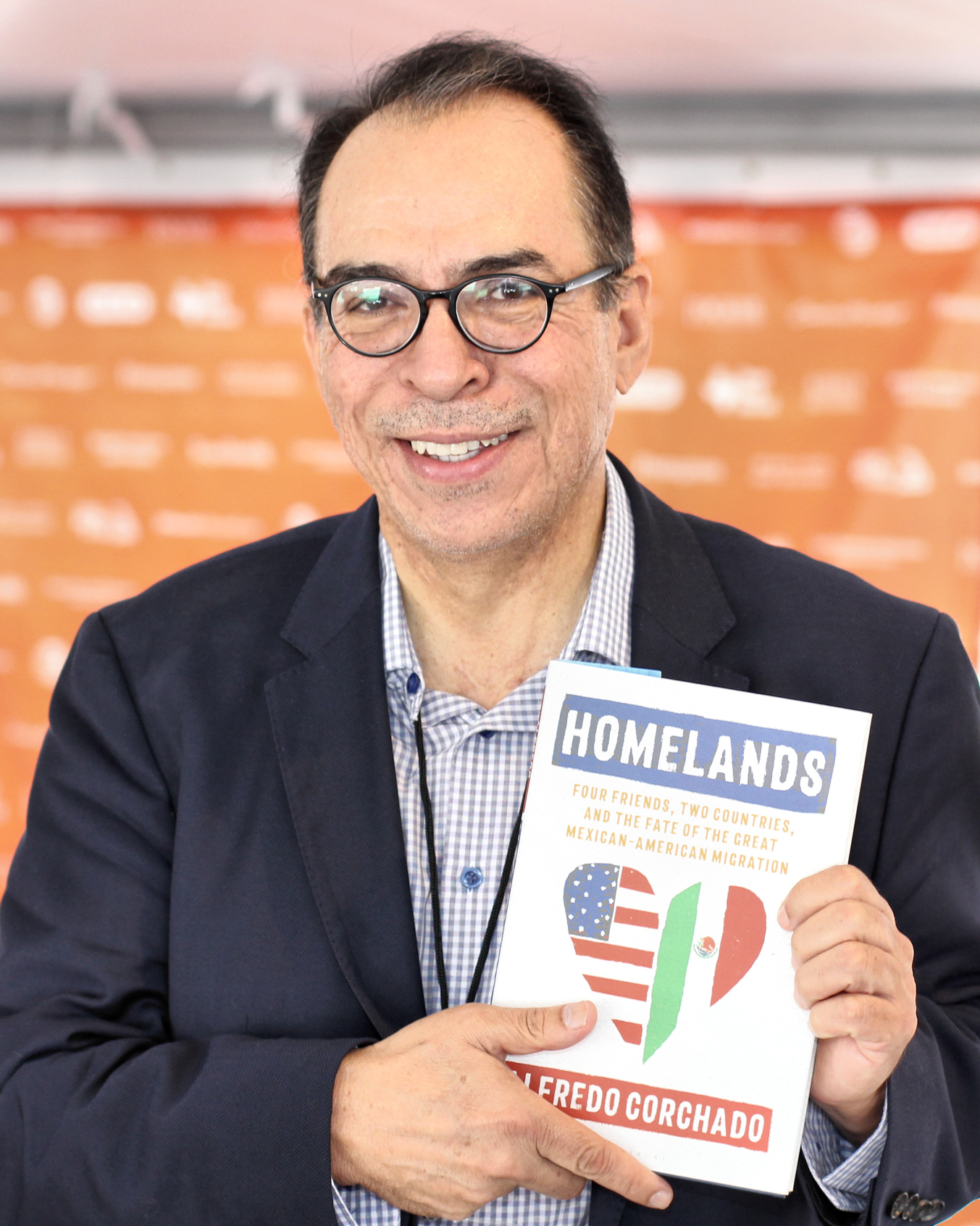
- Corchado at the 2018 Texas Book Festival
- Born: Alfredo Corchado Jiménez; Durango, Mexico
- Education: University of Texas at El Paso (BA)
- Occupations: Journalist; Author
- Years active: 1994–present

Alfredo Corchado Jiménez is a Mexican-American journalist and author who has covered the U.S.-Mexico Border for decades. He is currently the executive director of Puente News Collaborative, an El Paso-based non-profit focused on journalism from the border region, and previously served as the Mexico City bureau chief of The Dallas Morning News. He specializes in covering the drug wars, immigration, and the U.S.-Mexico border, writing stories on topics such as drug cartels and organized crime, corruption among police and government officials, and the spread of drug cartels into U.S. cities.

The Nieman Foundation for Journalism has noted that he has "described mass shootouts that no one else writes about, obtained and described videos of revenge executions, and revealed how the few arrested for the mass murder of women in Juárez are often innocent stooges." Howard Campbell, author of Drug War Zone, has called Corchado "the top American journalist covering Mexico today" whose "knowledge of the Mexican political system, the drug trade, and modern Mexican society is non-pareil." Corchado currently lives between El Paso and Mexico City.

== Early life and education ==
Corchado was born in Durango, Mexico as the oldest of eight children, and was raised in California and Texas. When he was five years old, his mother, in despair over an accident in which his younger sister died, decided to leave Mexico. Taking him and his siblings, she and his father migrated legally to the United States when he was six to the San Joaquin Valley in California, where Corchado's parents became migrant farm workers. He worked the fields alongside his parents, who were members of the United Farm Workers union led by Cesar Chavez. When he was thirteen, PBS interviewed him for a piece on the lives of migrant workers.

Corchado later recalled "the fact that there were people interested in our situation, and how we lived, and the fact that the fields had no water, there were no toilets...just the fact that anybody cared, and they were interested in giving us a voice―I think that always kind of stayed with me as a kid." He has also written, however, that before his interest in journalism he had aspiration of becoming a songwriter.

Corchado's family later moved to El Paso, Texas, where they ran a restaurant called Fred's Cafe. He graduated from El Paso Community College in 1984 and graduated from the University of Texas at El Paso in 1987 with a Bachelor of Arts in Journalism. Corchado later said that his parents felt that he, as the oldest child, should set an example for his younger siblings, and that UT at El Paso was the perfect place to prepare for a career as a foreign correspondent because it is situated "right on the border, so that when you park your car and walk to the campus you're looking at another country right before your eyes." He has stated that most Americans "don't really know Mexico," but UT at El Paso was a "unique place" that provided "a bridge between these two countries," which he desired in his journalism.

Corchado credited his mother with having encouraged him to return to school and making it possible for him "to leave the fields." When told that he was not cut out for journalism, he had considered becoming the manager of his parents' restaurant. "But I realized how much I loved being a journalist." And so he continued his pursuit of journalism.

== Career ==
Corchado also stated that his dream of a career in journalism was largely based on the hopes of finding the roots of his homeland. According to different accounts, Corchado's parents were supportive of his journalism, but did not want him to report on drug trafficking. Corchado has said that he tried to avoid writing about the drug wars "until the issue was something you couldn't ignore anymore."

Corchado worked on the U.S.-Mexico border for Public Radio, later becoming a reporter for the Standard-Examiner in Ogden, Utah; the El Paso Herald-Post; and The Wall Street Journal, based in its Philadelphia and Dallas bureaus. Because the Journal would not send him to Mexico, he eventually decided to take a job at the Dallas Morning News.

He went to work for the Morning News in 1994, based in Mexico. He traveled around Cuba extensively on many occasions, reporting on a range of topics, before helping to open the newspaper's Havana bureau, which was one of the first U.S. news bureaus to be established in that country.

He left Mexico for Washington in 2000, convinced "that the election of an opposition government, the end of 71 years of one party rule, signaled the automatic birth of democratic institutions" in Mexico. However, he later remarked that organized crime took power and began buying off agencies ranging from police to the media, becoming the de facto rulers of the country.

Accordingly, after working from 2000 to 2003 out of the Morning News’s Washington, D.C., bureau, he returned to Mexico to serve as the newspaper's Mexico City bureau chief. He was the Morning News's lead reporter during Mexico's 2000 presidential election, was the first to interview the newly elected President Vicente Fox, and was one of a small group of experts who briefed then Secretary of State Hillary Clinton before her first trip to Mexico. But the abiding preoccupation of his journalism has been with the U.S.-Mexico border and the drug wars.

Late in 2003, he began covering a series of killings of women in Ciudad Juárez. His discovery that the Juárez cartel and a U.S. informant had played roles in the killings led to an internal U.S. inquiry and to the removal of high-ranking officials in the Immigration Customs Enforcement agency. In 2005, his reporting on drug violence led him to the discovery that crimes had been committed in Texas on the orders of the Zetas, a Mexican paramilitary group.

Corchado wrote in May 2012 that with the U.S. economy in a downturn, "Mexicans are increasingly staying in their hometowns, finding jobs and carving out a livelihood, or...migrating inside Mexico in search of work." Largely thanks to a successful tourism campaign, he noted, Mexico's south is "booming" – so prosperous that, according to one Mexican working there, it "doesn't feel like Mexico." He wrote an article in November 2012 celebrating the fact that the city of Juárez "is indeed moving forward". In November 2012, he wrote that Enrique Peña Nieto, who was about to be sworn in as president, "takes over a nation of nearly 117 million with a resurgent economy that has become one of the most competitive in the world, surpassing Brazil in annual growth rate. Drug killings, which have been the top priority for Mexicans, aren’t over by any means, but they appear to be receding."

Interviewed on NPR in November 2012, shortly after the presidential election in Mexico, Corchado described the country as "very divided. They have very high expectations that Pena Nieto will somehow bring down the violence, somehow the economy will grow. I mean there is, at this point, zero migration to the United States, but they're hoping that even if the United States economy picks up, that Mexicans will still be able to stay in Mexico and build – keep building on that middle class society and transform into a country of rule of law."

== Books ==
Corchado is the author of Midnight in Mexico: A Reporter’s Journey, which was published in 2013 by Penguin.

Corchado has explained that "shortly after returning to Mexico, I received an offer to write a book, with the working title, Midnight in Mexico, which would mean more time away from work." Although concerned his editors would not want him to write it, they fully supported it, and expressed to him the importance of writing the book.

His book Homelands: Four Friends, Two Countries, and the Fate of the Great Mexican-American Migration, was published on June 5, 2018, by Bloomsbury. The book covers the story of the great Mexican American migration spanning the late 1980s to today, drawing from the experiences of Alfredo and three of his closest friends: David Suro Piñera, a restaurant owner and tequila connoisseur, Ken, a successful litigator involved in the Philadelphia political scene, and Primo, a human rights activist fighting for causes on both sides of the border. "That night we began a conversation that has lasted more than thirty years, turning on a fundamental and deeply personal question," writes Corchado, "How do we fit in? What does it mean to be American and become part of its diverse mainstream, integrate into its colorful tapestry, its noble ideals and timeless democratic principles?" Corchado's book has been praised by many including David Axelrod, who commented, "This personal, moving tale illuminates the very heart of the polarizing immigration debate that is roiling America today." Publishers Weekly praised Homelands, stating, "In addition to providing historical context for the current debate on immigration, this book is a timely and personal meditation on the concept of "migrant" in the United States."

== Other professional activities ==
Corchado has participated in many symposia and other such events in both the U.S. and Mexico, and has appeared on television and radio a number of times in both countries.

He took part in the U.S.-Mexico Forum in February 2008 at the University of California, Berkeley, sponsored by the Rockefeller Foundation in collaboration with the International Studies Department at the Instituto Tecnológico Autónomo de México (ITAM). He spoke on "How to Report in Mexico Without Being Jailed, Kidnapped or Killed."

In 2009, he took part in a forum on the Mexican drug war at Stanford University.

In 2010 he took part in a panel discussion at the Woodrow Wilson Center in Washington on the press freedom crisis in Mexico. He told the audience that "I was recently in Ciudad Juárez with a photojournalist who covered Bosnia, Baghdad, and Kabul and she said, this is worse than covering those places. At least there you had a sense of who's who. Here you're covering ghosts."

At a 2012 Logan Symposium on investigative journalism at UC Berkeley, Corchado took part in a panel discussion on the topic "When the Story Bites Back."

Corchado has discussed the drug war several times on WBUR radio and on The World, a co-production of the BBC World Service, PRI and WGBH Boston.

== Danger and death threats ==
Corchado has had his life threatened on numerous occasions, and has had to leave Mexico for short periods of time to ensure his safety. Despite this, he has continued to his work, Corchado has also stated that Ciudad Juárez, the city in which he covered his first story, was also the place he received death threats due to his journalism work in the city.

"Every journalist in Mexico," he has written, "wakes up to ask the following questions: How far should I go today, what questions should I ask, or not ask, where should I report, or what place should I avoid?....Mexico today is among the most dangerous places to do journalism in the world....This is especially true for those of us who cover the U.S.-Mexico border....Whatever danger we U.S. correspondents face pales in comparison to the dangers faced by our Mexican colleagues." He explains, "I've always had the luxury of calling my editor in Dallas and saying 'Hey, things are kind of crazy here―get me out of here.'" He has expressed gratitude that his parents, by emigrating to the U.S., had made it possible for him "to obtain a little blue passport that says I am a citizen of the United States of America," saying that "I have perhaps a naïve, but unwavering belief that if something is to happen to me, there would be consequences to pay. That our newspapers, our media companies, our colleagues would stand up and demand answers and justice, that our deaths wouldn’t become just another number. Someone would seek justice....My Mexican colleagues...don’t have that kind of solidarity among themselves; they don’t share that trust with their own editors, less so with their own government.".

While in Laredo, Texas, to investigate a story on organized crime in 2005, Corchado was ordered to drop the story by a stranger at a restaurant. The stranger said that there was a van parked outside waiting to pick him up, after which Corchado would be chopped into pieces, a videotape of which would then be sent to his mother in El Paso. Corchado did not drop the story, but did briefly consider becoming an entertainment reporter. Later in the year, he did decide to flee Mexico temporarily after reporting on a leaked video that revealed drug-cartel secrets and revealed government involvement in the cartels.

In 2007, Corchado received a tip from a "trusted U.S. intelligence source" that the Zetas, a paramilitary group spun off from the Gulf Cartel, would be killing an American journalist within 24 hours. The tipster believed that Corchado was the target, and urged that he leave Mexico at once. Corchado phoned some "colleagues who were preparing a celebration dinner for me that evening" – he had just been awarded the Maria Moors Cabot Prize – and "said, there's a death threat and I think we should cancel dinner. Dudley Althaus from the Houston Chronicle insisted, 'If they're going to kill you, he said, they will have to kill us, too. So come on over and have some tequila.'"

== Memberships ==
Corchado has been a member of the National Association of Hispanic Journalists since 1985.

== Honors and awards ==
Corchado received a 2007 Maria Moors Cabot prize from the School of Journalism at Columbia University in 2007, which cited his "extraordinary bravery and enterprise."

He has been a visiting fellow at the David Rockefeller Center for Latin American Studies at Harvard University since 2008.

He was a 2009 Nieman Fellow at Harvard University, and in the same year won the Gold Nugget from the University of Texas at El Paso.

Due to Corchado's work, the Dallas Morning News was a finalist for a prize awarded by the Center for Public Integrity in Washington.

He was named as part of the 2014 International Latino Book Awards Finalists.

For his coverage of drug trafficking and government corruption along the border, Corchado received the Elijah Parish Lovejoy Award for courage in journalism, bestowed annually by Colby College in Waterville, Maine. In announcing the award, which was presented on September 26, 2010, Colby College reported that Corchado "is regarded as the most intrepid reporter on that beat, according to members of the Lovejoy Selection Committee."

Corchado was also a Woodrow Wilson Scholar in June and July 2010, working on a project entitled "A Blood Curse: A Personal Account of Mexico's Descent into Darkness," which later became Midnight in Mexico.

In 2017, Corchado was named one of Americas Quarterly's Top 5 "Border Ambassadors" for his work bringing Mexico and the United States together. He also was a visiting Fellow in the spring of 2017 at the Institute of Politics at the University of Chicago leading a seminar series, "Borderlands: The U.S., Mexico, and the Ties that Bind."

He was inducted into the Texas Institute of Letters in 2018, and is also a former director of the Borderlands Program at the Walter Cronkite School of Journalism at Arizona State University.

== Personal life ==
Corchado is in a long-term relationship with Angela Kocherga, the border bureau chief for Belo TV, a Texas-based television corporation owned by the same company as the Morning News. "I do worry [about him], but we also can't be paralyzed by fear," she has said. "If I wasn't doing this myself, maybe I'd be more worried."
