= 2015 All-Ireland Under-21 B Hurling Championship =

Details of the 2015 All-Ireland Under-21 B Hurling Championship.

== Overview ==
Kildare are the defending champions, having beaten Roscommon in the 2014 All-Ireland final.

== Fixtures/results ==
=== Quarter-finals ===
8 August 2015 Quarter-final	Roscommon	w/o - scr.	Armagh

8 August 2015 Quarter-final	Meath	2-15 - 1-17	Kerry	St. Loman's Park
	J Regan (0-6, 3f, 1'65), F Flattery (1-2), G McGowan (1-0), L Martyn (0-3), S McGrath (0-2), J Wall (0-1), C O'Shea (0-1).		P McGrath (0-9, 7f, 1'65), R Heffernan (1-0), P Lucid (0-3), B O'Leary (0-2), M O'Leary (0-2), J Brick (0-1).	Referee: G McGrath

8 August 2015 Quarter-final	Donegal	1-6 - 1-14	Mayo	O'Donnell Park
				Referee: É Hassan

8 August 2015 Quarter-final	Wicklow	2-14 - 0-18	Kildare	Pearse Park
	G Weir (0-7f), P Doran (1-0), P Doyle (1-0), C O'Byrne (0-3), A Kavanagh (0-2), A Byrne (0-1), J Cranley (0-1).		G Keegan (0-14, 10f), D Keane (0-1), R Whelan (0-1), C Egan (0-1), R Casey (0-1).	Referee: J Heffernan

=== Semi-finals ===
22 August 2015 Semi-final	Meath	4-12 - 1-11	Mayo	St. Loman's Park
14:00	G McGowan (1-3), F Flattery (1-2), J Andrews (1-1), S Doyle (1-1), J Regan (0-3f), L Martyn (0-1), S Quigley (0-1).	Report	S Regan (1-2, 0-2f), F Boland (0-4, 2f), A O Suilleabhean (0-2), C Scahill (0-2), J Gallagher (0-1).	Referee: C Cunning

22 August 2015 Semi-final	Roscommon	0-11 - 1-14	Wicklow	Athleague GAA Park
14:00	D Glynn (0-2f), C Dolan (0-4f), W Boyle (0-1), C Duignan (0-1), G Egan (0-1f), M Beirne (0-1), G Downey (0-1).	Report	G Weir (0-7, 4f), C O'Byrne (1-2), P Doran (0-3), P Doyle (0-1), J Cranley (0-1).	Referee: J Clarke

=== Final ===
12 September 2015 Final	Meath	2-15 - 2-17	Wicklow	Semple Stadium
17:15
