= Elijah Parish Lovejoy Award =

Colby American College Award

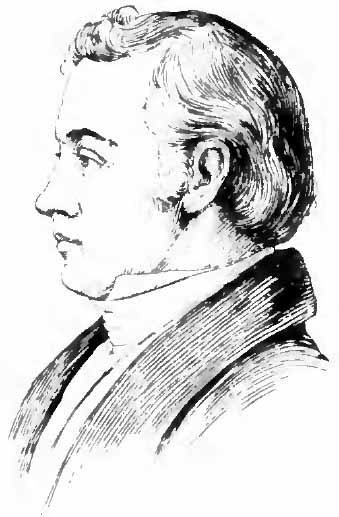
- Awarded for: A member of the newspaper profession who has contributed to the country's journalistic achievement.
- Country: USA
- Presented by: Colby College
- First award: 1952
- Website: Official website

The Elijah Parish Lovejoy Award is presented annually by Colby College to a member of the newspaper profession who has contributed to the country's journalistic achievement. The award is named for Elijah Parish Lovejoy, and established in 1952.

== Award criteria ==
The award was established to:

1. Stimulate and honor the kind of achievement in the field of reporting, editing, and interpretive writing that continues the Lovejoy heritage of fearlessness and freedom.
2. Promote a sense of mutual responsibility and cooperative effort between a newspaper world devoted to journalistic freedom and a liberal arts college dedicated to academic freedom.

The recipient is chosen, based on a selection committee's judgement of a journalist's integrity, craftsmanship, character, intelligence, and courage.

== Recipients ==
Year	Recipient	References
2024	Jacqueline Charles	
2023	Evan Gershkovich	
2018	Chuck Plunkett	
2017	Alec MacGillis	
2016	Alissa Rubin	
2015	Katherine Boo	
2014	James Risen	
2013	A. C. Thompson	
2012	Bob Woodward	
2011	Soraya Sarhaddi Nelson	
2010	Alfredo Corchado Jimenez	
2009	Paul Salopek	
2008	Anne Hull	
2007	John F. Burns	
2006	Jerry Mitchell	
2005	Cynthia Tucker	
2004	Louis "Studs" Terkel	
2003	Steve Mills and Maurice Possley	
2002	Daniel Pearl	
2001	Pat and Tom Gish	
2000	Bill Kovach	
1999	William Raspberry	
1998	Ellen Goodman	
1997	David Halberstam	
1996	John Seigenthaler	
1995	Murray Kempton	
1994	Eugene Patterson	
1993	Eileen Shanahan	
1992	Sydney Schanberg	
1991	Robert C. Maynard	
1990	David S. Broder	
1989	Eugene L. Roberts, Jr.	
1988	John Kifner	
1987	Paul Simon	
1985	Mary McGrory	
1984	Thomas Winship	
1983	Anthony Lewis	
1982	W. E. Chilton III	
1981	A. M. Rosenthal	
1980	Roger Tatarian	
1979	Katherine "Kay" Fanning	
1978	Jack C. Landau, Clayton Kirkpatrick	
1977	Donald Bolles	
1976	Vermont C. Royster	
1975	William Davis Taylor	
1974	James Reston	
1973	Katharine Graham	
1972	Dolph C Simons, Jr	
1971	Erwin D. Canham	
1969	John S. Knight	
1968	Carl Rowan	
1967	Edwin A. Lahey	
1966	Otis Chandler	
1965	Colbert Augustus McKnight	
1964	John Hay Whitney	
1963	Louis M. Lyons	
1962	Thomas M. Storke	
1961	Bernard Kilgore	
1960	Ralph McGill	
1959	Clark R. Mollenhoff	
1958	John N. Heiskell	
1957	Buford Boone	
1956	Arthur Hays Sulzberger	
1955	Charles A. Sprague	
1954	James Russell Wiggins	
1953	Irving Dilliard	
1952	James S. Pope	

== See also ==
- Elijah Parish Lovejoy Award (to editors)
