= Soraya Sarhaddi Nelson =

American journalist

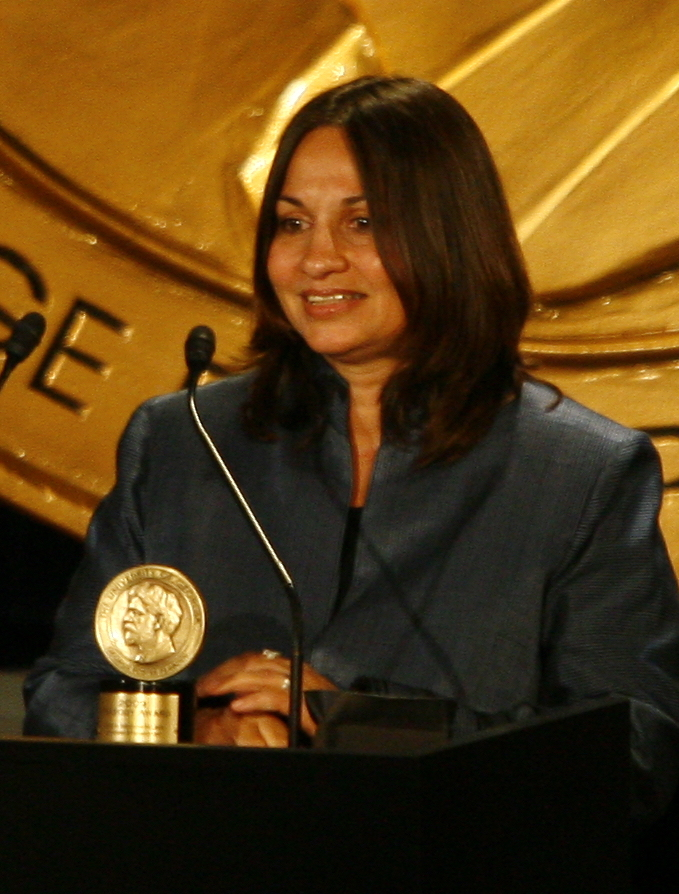
- Soraya Sarhaddi Nelson
- Born: Milwaukee, Wisconsin, U.S.
- Education: University of Maryland, College Park
- Occupation: Journalist
- Years active: 1985—
- Employer: National Public Radio
- Spouse: Erik Nelson
- Children: 1 son
- Awards: Pulitzer Prize (shared); Gracie Award; Overseas Press Club Award; Elijah Parish Lovejoy Award

Soraya Sarhaddi Nelson (/soʊˈraɪə sɑːrˈhɑːdi/) is an American journalist. She was previously an international correspondent for NPR, heading up bureaus in Kabul, Cairo and Berlin during her 13 years with the network.

== Early life and education ==
Nelson grew up in Milwaukee, Wisconsin, as the daughter of a German mother and Iranian father. She also spent some of her childhood in Iran, where her family resided for several years. She graduated high school in 1981 from Fallston High School in Maryland.

She received her undergraduate degree from the College of Journalism at University of Maryland, College Park in 1985.

== Career ==
=== 1985–2006: Newspapers ===
Nelson began her career at The Star Democrat in Easton, Maryland. After working at other newspapers in New York and Virginia, she served three years as editor and reporter at Newsday in New York. She shared the 1997 Pulitzer Prize for coverage of the 1996 TWA Flight 800 crash.

She subsequently joined the Los Angeles Times as a reporter, and following the September 11 attacks went on extended assignment in Iran and Afghanistan.

From 2002 to 2005, she worked as Knight Ridder's Middle East Bureau Chief. Nelson also worked for the Orange County Register covering California Governor Arnold Schwarzenegger.

In total, she was a newspaper reporter for more than 20 years.

=== 2006–2020: NPR ===
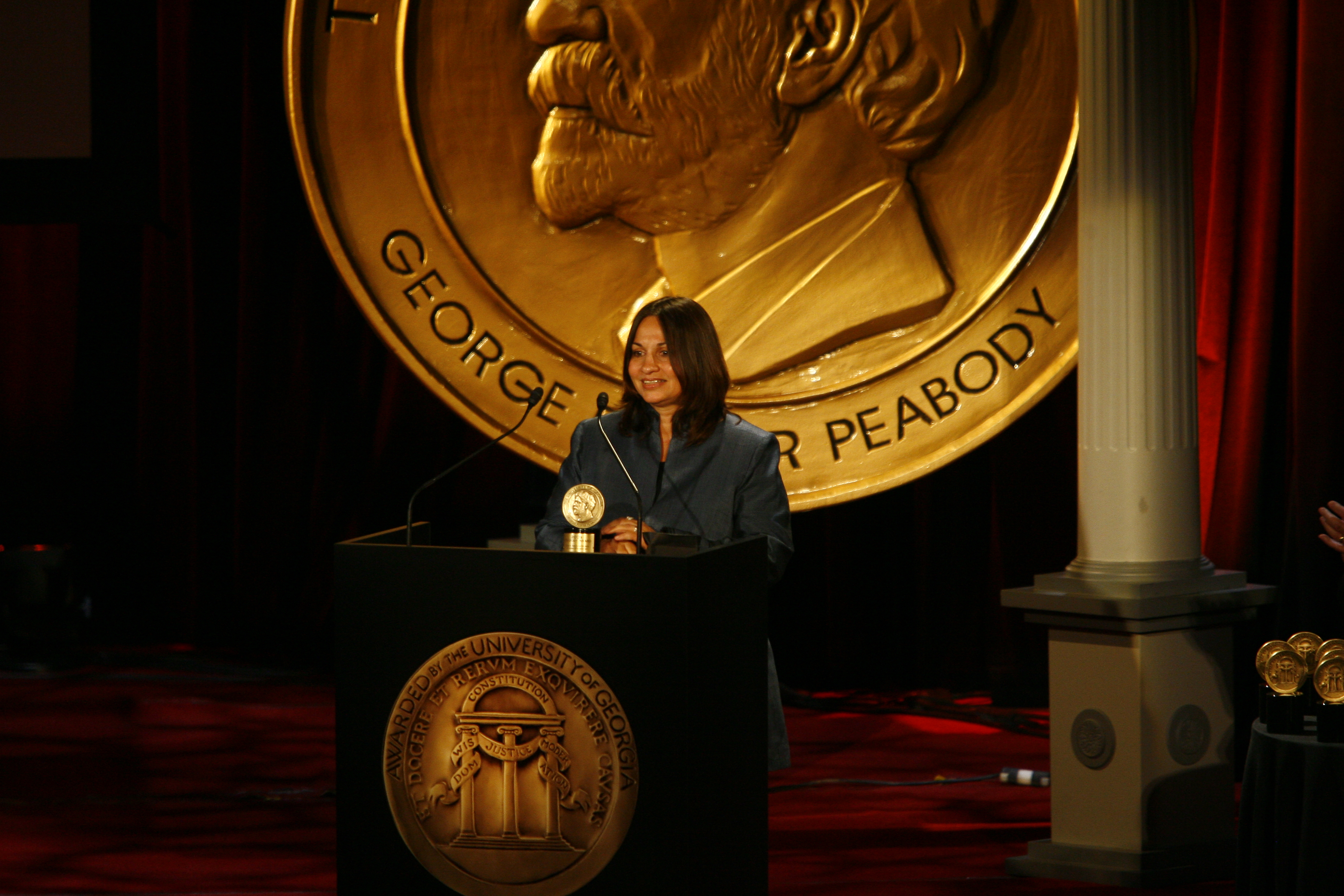
Soraya Sarhaddi Nelson at the 69th Annual Peabody Awards for Covering Afghanistan

Nelson joined NPR in 2006. Her reports are featured on several NPR programs, including Morning Edition, All Things Considered, and Weekend Edition. In 2006, she founded the NPR's permanent bureau in Kabul, which was the first permanent presence in Afghanistan for a U.S. broadcast network.

For her coverage of Afghanistan, Nelson received a Peabody Award in 2009. The award recognized Nelson's efforts over the previous year, which included a series on Afghan citizens turning to drugs to escape everyday miseries and the country's limited ability to offer rehabilitation; the story of determined girls breaking societal taboos and facing dangers to pursue an education; and a detailed account of how US Marines struggle to establish trust with locals in order to combat the Taliban. Peabody judges concluded that "No reporter in any medium gives us a better sense of the variety of life inside Afghanistan."

In June 2010, Nelson was assigned to cover the Arab World from NPR's Cairo, Egypt, bureau.

She received the Gracie Award and Overseas Press Club Award in 2010. In 2011, she received the 59th Elijah Parish Lovejoy Award for courageous journalism, the first non-newspaper journalist to receive the award. She has received an honorary Doctor of Laws degree from Colby College. Nelson's reporting on the wars in Iraq and Afghanistan, the Arab Spring uprisings, and subsequent developments in the Middle East were credited for her receiving these honors.

=== 2020: KCRW Berlin ===
Nelson joined English-language radio station KCRW Berlin as program director in spring 2020. The difficult economic headwinds of the early COVID pandemic led to the shuttering of the station in November 2020, marking the signoff of Berlin’s last U.S. radio broadcaster, a long-running tradition since the end of World War II in 1945.

== Personal life ==
Nelson lives in Berlin. She speaks Persian, Dari and German in addition to her native English.

Nelson is married to Erik Nelson, a fellow alum of the University of Maryland. They have one son.
