= Alec MacGillis =

American journalist

Alec MacGillis is an American journalist whose work has appeared in newspapers, magazines, an on-line news source, and books. Currently, he is a senior reporter for ProPublica and an editor-at-large for the Baltimore Banner. MacGillis is a resident of Baltimore, Maryland.

== Career ==
MacGillis’ father is Donald MacGillis, the former Boston Globe editorial writer and former executive editor of The Berkshire Eagle.

Alec MacGillis received a BA in history and English from Yale University. He has worked for six newspapers including The Baltimore Sun and The Washington Post. In 1997, he started working at The Brooklyn Paper. In 2011, he switched from newspaper journalism to writing for magazines. He wrote for The New Republic. In 2015, he began writing for Pro Publica.

MacGillis has also written several non-fiction books. In 2014, he published The Cynic: The Political Education of Mitch McConnell, a biography of Mitch McConnell. In 2021, MacGillis published Fulfillment: Winning and Losing in One-Click America.

== Awards and honors ==
In 2016, MacGillis won the Toner Prize for Excellence in Political Reporting.

In 2017, MacGillis won the George Polk Award.

In 2017, MacGillis received the Elijah Parish Lovejoy Award for his body of reporting on a wide range of issues including corporate influence on public policy, and aspects of the opioid crisis. The President of Colby college David A. Greene celebrated MacGillis for his “courageous and unyielding efforts to reveal truths that have been carefully shielded from public scrutiny.”

In 2017, MacGillis won the Topic of the Year award at the Scripps Howard Awards for his ProPublica story “The Breakdown" which was the culmination of spending 2016 exploring middle America to understand "the mounting wave of discontent, frustration and anger."
