= Megan K. Stack =

American journalist

Megan K. Stack is a contributing opinion writer to the New York Times. She has been a foreign correspondent in China, Russia, Egypt, Israel, Afghanistan and the U.S.-Mexico border area.

She covered the post 9/11 wars in Pakistan and Afghanistan and wrote a book, Every Man in This Village is a Liar: An Education in War. Her second book, Women's Work: A Personal Reckoning with Labor, Motherhood, and Privilege, is about her experiences giving up reporting to raise her first child.

== Early life ==
Stack studied Spanish language and literature at The George Washington University, where she earned a Bachelor of Arts degree between 1994 and 1998.

She was an editor on the school newspaper, The GW Hatchet, while at George Washington University.
