= 2023 All-Ireland Under-20 B Hurling Championship =

- Dates: 25 March - 6 May 2023
- Teams: 9
- Sponsor: oneills.com
- Champions: Derry; Ruairí Ó Mianáin (captain); Rian O'Neill (manager)
- Runners-up: Roscmmon; James Dillon (captain)

Tournament statistics
- Matches played: 8
- Goals scored: 43 (5.38 per match)
- Points scored: 245 (30.63 per match)
- Top scorer(s): Seán Canning (5-09); Ruairí Ó Mianáin (2-18)

The 2023 All-Ireland Under-20 B Hurling Championship was the most recent staging of the All-Ireland Under-20 Championship. The championship ran from 25 March to 6 May 2023.

Down entered the championship as defending champions, however, they were beaten by Roscommon in the All-Ireland semi-final.

The All-Ireland final was played on 6 May 2023 at Croke Park in Dublin, between Derry and Roscommon, in what was their first ever meeting in the All-Ireland final. Derry won the match by 3-17 to 2-14 to claim their first ever All-Ireland title.

Seán Canning and Ruairí Ó Mianáin were the championship's top scorers.

== Results ==
=== All-Ireland first round ===
25 March 2023 First round	Derry	5-21 - 2-09	Sligo	Owenbeg COE
	K Doherty (1-4), C Murtagh (1-3, 2f), R Henry (1-2), S Melaugh (1-1), E Cassidy (1-1), J Cassidy (0-4f), C Bradley (0-2), C Curley (0-2), C O’Kane (0-1) and A Duffin (0-1) .	Report	C Keenan (1-5, 1-5f), R O’Kelly-Lynch (1-0), D Flynn (0-1), R Gillespie (0-1), A Roslton (0-1), C Flynn (0-1).	Referee: A McAteer (Donegal)

=== All-Ireland quarter-finals ===
1 April 2023 Quarter-final	Armagh	2-06 - 1-16	Mayo	Glennon Brothers Pearse Park
	L Murtagh 0-5, J Toal 1-0, R McAllister 1-0, J Fox 0-1.		P Mooney 1-3, D Murray 0-5, S McGhee 0-3, M MacEvilly 0-2, J Byrne 0-1, C Enright 0-1, E Ryan 0-1.

2 April 2023 Quarter-final	Down	3-26 - 1-12	Wicklow	Darver COE
	F Turpin (1-8, 1f), E Pucci (1-4); J Duggan (1-3); M Dorian (0-4), E Bell (0-3), T Connelly (0-2), R O’Neill (0-1), R McCamphill (0-1).	Report	J O’Toole (0-5, 5f), D Byrne (1-1), C Byrne (0-2), M Óg O’Neill (0-1, f), O Harty (0-1), C Harmon (0-1), R Waters (0-1).	Referee: K Bray (Louth)

2 April 2023 Quarter-final	Roscommon	12-20 - 3-07	Tyrone	Dr. Hyde Park
	S Canning 3-2, B Mannion 2-5, F Killion 2-2, P Fallon 1-5, C Dowd 2-1, K Ryan 1-1, C Mulry 1-1, M Hussey 0-2, M Dillon 0-1.		T Mullin 3-1, AJ McCann 0-3, J McAteer 0-1, F Corry 0-1, C McKee 0-1.	Referee: J Judge (Mayo)

5 April 2023 Quarter-final	Derry	3-21 - 1-08	Donegal	Owenbeg COE
	R Ó Mianáin 1-6, S Melaugh 1-3, E Cassidy 1-2, J Friel 0-4 (frees), R Henry 0-2, C O’Kane, J Cassidy, A McBride, R McLaughlin 0-1 each	Report	L McKinney 1-4, 1-3f, K McNulty 0-2, O Marley 0-1, K Curran 0-1

=== All-Ireland semi-finals ===
15 April 2023 Semi-final	Mayo	1-07 - 1-24	Derry	Kingspan Breffni Park
	D Murray 0-4, R Fallon 1-0, C Enright 0-2, P Mooney 0-1.		R Ó Mianáin 0-7, E Cassidy 1-2, O McElhinney 0-4, S Melaugh 0-2, C Murtagh 0-2, J Friel 0-2, N McGonagle 0-2, J Cassidy 0-2, R Hendry 0-1.	Referee: A McAleer (Donegal)

15 April 2023 Semi-final	Down	0-20 - 3-17	Roscommon	Darver COE
	T McGrattan 0-9, F Turpin 0-5, S Milligan 0-2, M Dorrian 0-2, E Pucci 0-1, C Savage 0-1.		S Canning 1-6, C Murly 1-2, C Dowd 1-2, P Fallon 0-3, M Lohan 0-2, L Coyle 0-1, T Morris 0-1.	Referee: K Parke (Antrim)

=== All-Ireland final ===
6 May 2023 Final	Derry	3-17 - 2-14	Roscommon	Croke Park
	R Ó Mianain 1-5, J Friel 0-5 (3fs, 2 65s), K Doherty 1-1, R Henry 0-3, S Melaugh 1-0, J Cassidy 0-2, E Cassidy 0-1.	Report	P Fallon 0-9 (7fs), S Canning 1-1, L Coyle 1-1, C Dowd 0-2, R Conlon 0-1.	Referee: N Malone (Clare)

== Championship statistics ==
=== Top scorers ===
Overall

Rank	Player	Team	Tally	Total	Matches	Average
1	Seán Canning	Roscommon	5-09	24	3	8.00
1	Ruairí Ó Mianáin	Derry	2-18	24	3	8.00
3	Paddy Fallon	Roscommon	1-17	20	3	6.66
4	Finn Turpin	Down	1-13	16	2	8.00
5	Sedgae Melaugh	Derry	3-06	15	3	5.00
5	Eamon Cassidy	Derry	3-06	15	4	3.75
7	Chulainn Dowd	Roscommon	3-05	14	3	4.66
8	Keelan Doherty	Derry	2-05	11	3	3.33
8	Brian Mannion	Roscommon	2-05	11	2	5.50
8	James Friel	Derry	0-11	11	3	3.33

In a single game

Rank	Player	Team	Tally	Total	Opposition
1	Seán Canning	Roscommon	3-02	11	Tyrone
1	Brian Mannion	Roscommon	2-05	11	Tyrone
1	Finn Turpin	Down	1-08	11	Wicklow
4	Turlough Mullin	Tyrone	3-01	10	Roscommon
5	Ruairí Ó Mianáin	Derry	1-06	9	Donegal
5	Seán Canning	Roscommon	1-06	9	Down
5	Paddy Fallon	Roscommon	0-09	9	Derry
5	Tom McGrattan	Down	0-09	9	Roscommon
9	Finn Killion	Roscommon	2-02	8	Tyrone
9	Ruairí Ó Mianáin	Derry	1-05	8	Roscommon
9	Patrick Fallon	Roscommon	1-05	8	Tyrone
9	Ciarán Keenan	Sligo	1-05	8	Derry
