= Hawkfield =

Townland in County Kildare, Ireland

Hawkfield Gort an tSeabhaic
- Townland
- Location in Ireland
- Coordinates: 53°11′48″N 6°49′55″W
- Country: Ireland
- Province: Leinster
- County: County Kildare
- Elevation: 89 m (292 ft)
- Time zone: UTC+0 (WET)
  - Summer (DST): UTC-1 (IST (WEST))
- Irish Grid Reference: N780168

Hawkfield (Irish: Gort an tSeabhaic) is a townland in County Kildare, Ireland. It is located on the R416 regional road north of Newbridge. It lies between Newbridge town and Milltown village. It is positioned between Pollardstown Fen and the Bog of Allen - both of which are abundant with rare flora and fauna. It is home to Kildare GAA "centre of excellence".
