= John F. Burns =

British journalist (1944–2026)

- Born: 4 October 1944; Nottingham, England
- Died: 12 March 2026 (aged 81); Cambridgeshire, England
- Education: McGill University
- Occupation: Journalist
- Years active: 1970s–2015
- Spouses: Jane Peque Gnat (m. 1972; div. 1989) Jane Scott-Long (m. 1991)

John Fisher Burns (4 October 1944 – 12 March 2026) was a British journalist, and the winner of two Pulitzer Prizes. He was the London bureau chief for The New York Times, where he covered international issues until March 2015. Burns also frequently appeared on PBS. He was sometimes referred to as "the dean of American foreign correspondents".

== Early life and education ==
Burns was born in Nottingham, England, on 4 October 1944. His father was a South African who served as an officer and pilot in the Royal Air Force. He was educated at private schools including Stowe School. His family moved to Canada, where he received a degree in political science and economics at McGill University.

== Career ==
In the early 1970s, Burns wrote for The Globe and Mail of Canada, as a local and later parliamentary reporter. During this stint, Burns completed a master's in political science at McGill University. He was sent to the People's Republic of China in 1971 to be one of a few Western journalists in the PRC during the Cultural Revolution, after a confusion that led to his brief ban from the precincts of the Parliament of Canada by the Commons Speaker. Burns joined The New York Times in 1975, reporting, at first, for the paper's metropolitan section, and wrote ever since for the newspaper in various capacities.

He was assigned to and headed several of the Times foreign bureaus. Burns and fellow Times journalists John Darnton and Michael T. Kaufman won the 1978 George Polk Award for foreign reporting for coverage of Africa. Burns was the Times bureau chief in Moscow from 1981 to 1984. In 1986, while chief of the Times Beijing bureau, Burns was incarcerated on suspicion of espionage by the PRC government. Charges were dropped after an investigation, but Burns was subsequently expelled from the country.

Burns was awarded the 1993 Pulitzer Prize for International Reporting citing "his courageous and thorough coverage of the destruction of Sarajevo and the barbarous killings in the war in Bosnia-Herzegovina".

In the early to mid-1990s, Burns headed the New York Times' bureau in New Delhi, with responsibility for the Indian subcontinent and adjoining regions, from Afghanistan to Burma. He and his family resided in New Delhi though Burns was frequently on the road, travelling regularly to Kabul, Islamabad, Dhaka, Colombo and Kathmandu. He actively covered events in Afghanistan, which led to his second Pulitzer in 1997, this time "For his courageous and insightful coverage of the harrowing regime imposed on Afghanistan by the Taliban". Burns was based in Baghdad during the lead up to the Iraq war in 2003 and wrote extensively on the war and the subsequent occupation. In the run-up to US invasion, Burns wrote pro-invasion pieces.

From 1998 to 1999, he was a visiting fellow at King's College, Cambridge, studying Islamic history and culture.

In July 2007, Burns succeeded Alan Cowell as bureau chief in London. On 30 September 2007, Burns received the Elijah Parish Lovejoy Award as well as an honorary Doctor of Laws degree from Colby College.

In an October 2008 interview with the Russian Ambassador to Afghanistan, Zamir Kabulov, Burns accused Kabulov of being a KGB operative.

Burns was a frequent contributor to PBS, including a number of appearances on the Charlie Rose show and The NewsHour with Jim Lehrer via satellite from Afghanistan and Iraq. In a January 2009 interview, Michael Barone called Burns "one of the great foreign correspondents of our time". In an August 2010 interview with Charlie Rose, Christopher Hitchens, while recounting a tour of Sarajevo guided by Burns in which they were fired upon, called Burns "the greatest war correspondent of our time".

On 26 March 2015, The New York Times announced that an article about the burial of Richard III would conclude Burns's career at the New York Times.

== Personal life and death ==
Burns married Jane Peque Gnat in 1972. The couple divorced in 1989. In 1991, Burns married Jane Scott-Long, who manages the New York Times Baghdad bureau. Burns had two children, Jamie and Emily, and one stepchild, Toby, from his second marriage.

Burns died from pneumonia on the outskirts of Cambridge, on 12 March 2026, at the age of 81.
