= Fulfillment =

Fulfillment or fulfilment (see spelling differences) may refer to:

== Personal ==
- Self-fulfillment, satisfaction or happiness as a result of fully developing one's abilities or character
- Wish fulfillment, the gratification of desire, especially in dreams, daydreams, etc.

== Buildings ==
- Fulfillment Amphitheater, an outdoor amphitheatre in Taiwan

== Business ==
- Fulfillment house, a type of company that specializes in order fulfillment
- Order fulfillment, the activities performed once an order is received
- Service fulfillment, the process of providing services to telecommunication subscribers

== Books ==
- Fulfillment (book), a 2021 book by Alec MacGillis
