= Fulfillment (book) =

2021 book by Alec MacGillis

Fulfillment: Winning and Losing in One-Click America
- Author: Alec MacGillis
- Language: English
- Subject: Amazon
- Publisher: Farrar, Straus and Giroux
- Publication date: March 16, 2021
- Pages: 400
- ISBN: 978-0-374-15927-6

Fulfillment: Winning and Losing in One-Click America is a 2021 nonfiction book by Alec MacGillis that examines Amazon.

== Book ==
MacGillis is a journalist based in Baltimore who now writes for ProPublica; he previously wrote The Cynic: The Political Education of Mitch McConnell. In Fulfillment, he takes Amazon to task as an effective monopoly but also argues that the company is contributing to increasing economic and political division in the United States, writing about "the America that fell in the company's lengthening shadow" and Amazon's "outsized role in [a] zero-sum sorting" of inequality that is "making parts of the country incomprehensible to one another". He writes about how its success has been enabled by political influence at both local and national levels.

== Reception ==
Many reviewers praised MacGillis's wide-ranging and nuanced coverage of the issue of economic inequality and of Amazon's role in it, and noted the impact of the book's biographical vignettes as well as its timeliness, after an increase in orders during the COVID-19 pandemic had led to Amazon's most successful year yet. (MacGinnis writes that "it had become our civic duty, our cause larger than ourselves, to fulfill our needs online", drawing an analogy with war.) However, some reviewers found some of these vignettes too tenuously connected to Amazon, and others found sections on the past of various communities sprawling and over-long. A reviewer for the Wall Street Journal found MacGillis's argument "a bit far-fetched" since the loss of factory jobs and erosion of the power of labor unions started before the company's founding, and since Amazon's own dominance of the online marketplace is showing signs of weakening.
