= 2014 All-Ireland Under-21 B Hurling Championship =

Details of the 2014 All-Ireland Under-21 B Hurling Championship.

== Overview ==
Kerry are the defending champions, having beaten Kildare in the 2013 All-Ireland final.

== Fixtures/results ==
=== Connacht Under-21 B Hurling Championship ===
Quarter-final
Sligo	w/o
Leitrim	scr.

Semi-final
Mayo	4-21
Sligo	1-08

Final
Roscommon	4-15
Mayo	1-10

30 July 2014 Quarter-final	Sligo	w/o - scr.	Leitrim

8 August 2014 Semi-final	Mayo	4-21 - 1-8	Sligo

13 August 2014 Final	Roscommon	4-15 - 1-10	Mayo	Athleague
	R Fallon (1-6, 4f), R Kelly (1-2), T Fetherstone (1-2), J Henry (1-0), H Rooney (0-2), C Coyle (0-1), J Brennan (0-1), P Kenny (0-1).	Report	C Finn (0-6, 4f), S Boland (1-0), C Scahill (0-2), M Flannery (0-1), M Lyons(0-1).	Referee: J Keane (Galway)

=== Leinster Under-21 A Hurling Championship ===
Final
Kildare	2-07
Wicklow	0-12

23 July 2014 Final	Kildare	2-7 - 0-12	Wicklow	St. Conleth's Park

=== Ulster Under-21 Hurling Shield ===
Quarter-Finals
Tyrone	3-36
Cavan	0-05

Semi-Finals
Monaghan	1-12
Fermanagh	3-09
Donegal	3-08
Tyrone	4-06

Final
Fermanagh	scr.
Tyrone	w/o

14 June 2014 Quarter-final	Tyrone	3-36 - 0-5	Cavan	Garvaghey
14:00				Referee: A Ferguson

18 June 2014 Semi-final	Monaghan	1-12 - 3-9	Fermanagh	Inniskeen
19:30				Referee: M Loftus

25 June 2014 Semi-final	Donegal	3-8 - 4-6	Tyrone	O'Donnell Park
20:00				Referee: A Nash

19 July 2014 Final	Tyrone	w/o - scr.	Fermanagh

=== All-Ireland Under-21 B Hurling Championship ===
Semi-Finals
1L	Kildare	w/o
1U	Tyrone	scr.
1M	Kerry	2-13
1C	Roscommon	4-10

Final
1L	Kildare	1-14
1C	Roscommon	1-11

23 August 2014 Semi-final	Kildare	w/o - scr.	Tyrone

23 August 2014 Semi-final	Kerry	2-13 - 4-10	Roscommon	Cusack Park
		Report

13 September 2014 Final	Kildare	1-14 - 1-11	Roscommon	Semple Stadium
17:10	G Keegan 0-9 (2f), R Casey 1-1, E Dempsey 0-2, K Murphy & S O’Flynn 0-1 each.	Report	T Featherston 1-1, R Fallon 0-4f, N Fallon (f), C Duignan, J Henry, R Kelly, A Finnerty & S Naughton 0-1 each.	Referee: O Elliott (Antrim)
