= Louis M. Lyons =

American journalist and curator

- Born: September 1, 1897; Boston, Massachusetts
- Died: April 11, 1982 (aged 84); Cambridge, Massachusetts
- Education: Massachusetts Agricultural College
- Occupations: Journalist, curator
- Employer(s): The Boston Globe, Harvard
- Spouse: Catherine
- Children: 4
- Awards: Peabody Award (1957); Lovejoy Award (1963); Alfred I. duPont Award (1963)

Louis Martin Lyons (September 1, 1897 – April 11, 1982) was an American journalist in Massachusetts and curator of the Nieman Foundation for Journalism at Harvard University.

== Biography ==
Lyons was born in Boston in 1897 and was a graduate of Massachusetts Agricultural College, now known as the University of Massachusetts Amherst. Lyons was a reporter for The Boston Globe in 1919 and from 1923 to 1946; In 1971, he published a history of the first 100 years of that newspaper.

In 1938 Lyons was part of the first group of people awarded the Nieman Fellowship. In 1940, he took the position of curator for the Nieman Foundation for Journalism at Harvard University, where he worked until retiring in 1964. Lyons also wrote for The Springfield Republican and The Christian Science Monitor, and published memoirs and other books. Lyons died of lymphoma at the Stillman Infirmary at Harvard in 1982; he was survived by his wife, a daughter, and three sons.

The Louis M. Lyons Award is named after him and "honors displays of conscience and integrity by individuals, groups or institutions in communications." The Louis M. Lyons Foundation was formed in 2005 to preserve his TV and radio broadcasts (for WGBH Boston) and also to compile his unpublished memoirs and various articles for publication.

Awards

- 1957:
  - Peabody Award for Best Reporting and Interpretation of the News from a Local Station
- 1963:
  - Elijah Parish Lovejoy Award from Colby College
  - Honorary Doctor of Laws from Colby College
  - Alfred I. duPont Award
