= Shealan Johnston =

Gaelic footballer

Personal information
- Native name: Shealan Mac Seáin (Irish)
- Born: 19 January 2001 (age 25)

Sport
- Sport: Gaelic football
- Position: Forward
Club
- Years: Club
- 2019–: Kilcoo
Club titles
- Down titles: 4
- Ulster titles: 2
- All-Ireland Titles: 1
Inter-county
- Years: County
- 2020: Down
Inter-county titles
- Ulster titles: 0

Shealan Johnston (born 19 January 2001) is a Gaelic footballer who plays for Kilcoo and the Down county team.

== Playing career ==
=== Club ===
Johnston joined the Kilcoo club at a young age and progressed to the club's senior team.

On 13 October 2019, Johnston played in his first county final, coming on as a sub against Warrenpoint, with Kilcoo coming out on top by a point. Kilcoo reached the final of the Ulster championship. Johnston started the final against Naomh Conaill, and Kilcoo claimed their first Ulster title with a two-point victory. Johnston scored a point in the All-Ireland semi-final against Ballyboden St Enda's as Kilcoo reached the All-Ireland final. The All-Ireland final against Corofin took place on 19 January 2020, his 19th birthday. Johnston started the final and Kilcoo forced a draw in normal time, but Corofin pulled away in extra-time to win the title.

Johnston played in his first county final as a starter in 2020, with Kilcoo facing Carryduff. Johnston scored a point as Kilcoo successfully defended their title.

On 7 November 2021, Johnston scored two points as Kilcoo got the better of Burren to win their third county title in a row. Kilcoo reached their second consecutive Ulster final, facing Fermanagh kingpins Derrygonnelly. Johnston scored a goal as Kilcoo won their second Ulster title. Kilcoo reached their second All-Ireland final after beating St Finbarr's, where they faced Kilmacud Crokes. The final went to extra-time once again, and a late goal from Shealan's brother Jerome secured Kilcoo's first All-Ireland title.

Johnston played in his fourth consecutive county final in 2022, facing Warrenpoint on October 16. Johnston scored a point as Kilcoo won their fourth county championship in a row.

=== Inter-county ===
==== Minor and Under-20 ====
Johnston captained the Down under-20 team in 2021. Down reached the Ulster final, where they would meet Monaghan. The final took place on 30 July, and Johnston scored two points as Down came out on top after extra-time. On 7 August, Johnston scored a goal in the All-Ireland semi-final loss to Roscommon.

==== Senior ====
Johnston joined the Down senior team in 2020. Johnston made his National League debut as a substitute in a loss to Louth on 25 October. Johnston made his Ulster championship debut on 15 November, scoring a point in a semi-final loss to Cavan.

== Honours ==
Down

- Ulster Under-20 Football Championship (1): 2021 (c)

Kilcoo

- All-Ireland Senior Club Football Championship (1): 2021–22
- Ulster Senior Club Football Championship (2): 2019, 2021
- Down Senior Football Championship (4): 2019, 2020, 2021, 2022
