= 2013 Down Senior Football Championship =

Tournament details
- County: Down
- Province: Ulster
- Year: 2013
- Trophy: Frank O'Hare Cup
- Sponsor: Morgan Fuels
- Teams: 16
- Defending champions: Kilcoo

Winners
- Champions: Kilcoo (12th win)
- Qualify for: 2013 Ulster Club SFC

Runners-up
- Runners-up: Burren

The 2013 Down Senior Football Championship was the 105th official edition of Down GAA's premier Gaelic Football tournament for senior clubs in County Down. 16 teams competed with the winner representing Down in the Ulster Senior Club Football Championship.

Following a revamp of the competition format, which was approved at the end of the 2011 season, a group stage was introduced to the Championship for the first time. This format was only used for two seasons, and ran until the end of the 2014 competition.

Kilcoo were the holders after defeating Mayobridge in the 2012 final, and retained the title after defeating St Mary's Burren in the 2013 final.

== Round 1 ==
The 16 participating teams were drawn into 4 groups. The top two sides in each group advanced to the quarter finals.

=== Group A ===
Pos	Team	Pld	W	D	L	PF	PA	PD	Pts	Qualification
1	Mayobridge	3	3	0	0	60	35	+25	6	Advance to quarter-final
2	Saval	3	1	1	1	39	46	−7	3	Advance to quarter-final
3	Rostrevor	3	1	0	2	50	54	−4	2	
4	Warrenpoint	3	0	1	2	39	53	−14	1	

Updated to match(es) played on 01 September 2013. Source:

8 August 2013 Round 1	Rostrevor	1–08 – 1–15	Mayobridge	Newry
				Venue: Páirc Esler

11 August 2013 Round 1	Warrenpoint	0–09 – 0–09	Saval	Hilltown
				Venue: Clonduff Park

16 August 2013 Round 2	Mayobridge	1–16 – 1–10	Warrenpoint	Newry
				Venue: Páirc Esler

16 August 2013 Round 2	Saval	3–10 – 1–11	Rostrevor	Newry
				Venue: Páirc Esler

1 September 2013 Round 3	Saval	0–11 – 3–14	Mayobridge	Hilltown
				Venue: Clonduff Park

1 September 2013 Round 3	Rostrevor	4–13 – 2–11	Warrenpoint	Burren
				Venue: St Mary's Park

=== Group B ===
Pos	Team	Pld	W	D	L	PF	PA	PD	Pts	Qualification
1	Bryansford	3	3	0	0	50	27	+23	6	Advance to quarter-final
2	Burren	3	2	0	1	57	24	+33	4	Advance to quarter-final
3	Ballyholland Harps	3	1	0	2	44	42	+2	2	
4	An Riocht	3	0	0	3	25	83	−58	0	

Updated to match(es) played on 30 August 2013. Source:

8 August 2013 Round 1	Ballyholland Harps	0–06 – 1–15	Burren	Newry
				Venue: Páirc Esler

11 August 2013 Round 1	An Riocht	1–05 – 4–13	Bryansford	Newry
				Venue: Páirc Esler

15 August 2013 Round 2	Bryansford	0–15 – 1–09	Ballyholland Harps	Mayobridge
				Venue: St Patrick's Park

19 August 2013 Round 2	Burren	6–14 – 1–05	An Riocht	Newry
				Venue: Páirc Esler

30 August 2013 Round 3	Bryansford	1–07 – 0–07	Burren	Kilcoo
				Venue: Páirc Eoghan Rua

30 August 2013 Round 3	Ballyholland Harps	5–11 – 1–06	An Riocht	Mayobridge
				Venue: St Patrick's Park

=== Group C ===
Pos	Team	Pld	W	D	L	PF	PA	PD	Pts	Qualification
1	Castlewellan	3	3	0	0	59	23	+36	6	Advance to quarter-final
2	Clonduff	3	2	0	1	39	36	+3	4	Advance to quarter-final
3	Annaclone	3	1	0	2	35	45	−10	2	
4	Liatroim	3	0	0	3	22	51	−29	0	

Updated to match(es) played on 29 August 2013. Source:

9 August 2013 Round 1	Liatroim	0–08 – 0–14	Clonduff	Castlewellan
				Venue: St Malachy's Park

10 August 2013 Round 1	Annaclone	1–02 – 2–18	Castlewellan	Downpatrick
				Venue: Páirc Tomás Ruséil

17 August 2013 Round 2	Castlewellan	1–11 – 1–06	Liatroim	Kilcoo
				Venue: Páirc Eoghan Rua

17 August 2013 Round 2	Clonduff	2–10 – 0–07	Annaclone	Kilcoo
				Venue: Páirc Eoghan Rua

29 August 2013 Round 3	Liatroim	0–05 – 2–17	Annaclone	Newcastle
				Venue: St Patrick's Park

29 August 2013 Round 3	Castlewellan	2–15 – 1–06	Clonduff	Newry
				Venue: Páirc Esler

=== Group D ===
Pos	Team	Pld	W	D	L	PF	PA	PD	Pts	Qualification
1	Kilcoo	3	3	0	0	72	32	+40	6	Advance to quarter-final
2	Loughinisland	3	1	1	1	41	51	−10	3	Advance to quarter-final
3	RGU Downpatrick	3	0	2	1	41	44	−3	2	
4	Longstone	3	0	1	2	39	66	−27	1	

Updated to match(es) played on 02 September 2013. Source:

8 August 2013 Round 1	Loughinisland	2–11 – 0–08	Longstone	Newcastle
				Venue: St Patrick's Park

11 August 2013 Round 1	RGU Downpatrick	1–06 – 0–12	Kilcoo	Newry
				Venue: Páirc Esler

18 August 2013 Round 2	Longstone	2–12 – 0–18	RGU Downpatrick	Castlewellan
				Venue: St Malachy's Park

18 August 2013 Round 2	Kilcoo	4–17 – 1–07	Loughinisland	Downpatrick
				Venue: Páirc Tomás Ruséil

28 August 2013 Round 3	Longstone	2–07 – 4–19	Kilcoo	Newry
				Venue: Páirc Esler

2 September 2013 Round 3	RGU Downpatrick	2–08 – 3–05	Loughinisland	Newcastle
				Venue: St Patrick's Park

== Quarter Final ==
The Quarter Final was a seeded round, where a group winner was drawn against a group runner up. Teams that qualified from the same group could not be drawn against one another in this round.

13 September 2013 Quarter Final	Bryansford	0–10 – 1–10	Saval	Newry
				Venue: Páirc Esler

14 September 2013 Quarter Final	Castlewellan	0–11 – 1–14	Burren	Newry
				Venue: Páirc Esler

15 September 2013 Quarter Final	Mayobridge	3–08 – 2–09	Loughinisland	Downpatrick
				Venue: Páirc Tomás Ruséil

16 September 2013 Quarter Final	Kilcoo	2–17 – 0–05	Clonduff	Newry
				Venue: Páirc Esler

== Semi Final ==
The Semi Final will see the four winning sides face off for a place in this year's final. This round is an open draw from the four Quarter Final winners.

29 September 2013 Semi Final	Burren	7–16 – 0–09	Saval	Newry
				Venue: Páirc Esler

30 September 2013 Semi Final	Kilcoo	0–15 – 2–07	Mayobridge	Newry
				Venue: Páirc Esler

== Final ==
The final was played between the two Semi Final winners, and took place at Páirc Esler, Newry.

20 October 2013 Final	Burren	0–07 – 0–09	Kilcoo	Newry
				Venue: Páirc Esler
		Report
