= 2015 Down Senior Football Championship =

Tournament details
- County: Down
- Province: Ulster
- Year: 2015
- Trophy: Frank O'Hare Cup
- Sponsor: Morgan Fuels
- Teams: 16
- Defending champions: Kilcoo

Winners
- Champions: Kilcoo (14th win)
- Qualify for: 2015 Ulster Club SFC

Runners-up
- Runners-up: Castlewellan

The 2015 Down Senior Football Championship was the 107th official edition of Down GAA's premier Gaelic Football tournament for senior clubs in County Down. 16 teams competed with the winner representing Down in the Ulster Senior Club Football Championship.

Following the conclusion of the 2014 competition, the group stage format was removed. In its place, the 2015 tournament used a double elimination format for the opening two rounds of the championship, with the winners and early round losers rejoining at the quarter final stage.

Kilcoo were the holders after defeating St Mary's Burren in the 2014 final, and retained the title after defeating Castlewellan in the 2015 final.

== Round 1 ==
The 16 participating teams were placed into an open draw. Winning sides move to Round 2A while losing sides go into Round 2B.

| 7 August 2015 Round 1 | Annaclone | 1–06 – 0–11 | Liatroim |

| 7 August 2015 Round 1 | Bryansford | 1–06 – 1–12 | Clonduff |

| 8 August 2015 Round 1 | Glenn | 1–15 – 1–13 | Longstone |

| 8 August 2015 Round 1 | Ballyholland Harps | 0–10 – 1–08 | Warrenpoint |

| 9 August 2015 Round 1 | Clann na Banna | 0–06 – 2–18 | Castlewellan |

| 9 August 2015 Round 1 | Saval | 0–08 – 2–15 | Mayobridge |

| 9 August 2015 Round 1 | Burren | 2–13 – 2–10 (a.e.t.) | Kilcoo |

| 10 August 2015 Round 1 | Rostrevor | 1–12 – 0–09 | RGU Downpatrick |

== Round 2 ==
=== Round 2A ===
Round 2A will feature the eight winning sides from Round 1, with an open draw to determine the fixtures. The winning sides progress directly to the Quarter Final, with the losing sides moving into Round 3.

| 21 August 2015 Round 2A | Burren | 4–21 – 0–09 | Liatroim | Newry |
| 18:30 IST (UTC+1) | | | | Venue: Páirc Esler |

| 21 August 2015 Round 2A | Clonduff | 1–11 – 0–15 | Rostrevor | Newry |
| 20:00 IST (UTC+1) | | | | Venue: Páirc Esler |

| 23 August 2015 Round 2A | Glenn | 1–06 – 0–11 | Warrenpoint | Newry |
| 18:00 IST (UTC+1) | | | | Venue: Páirc Esler |

| 23 August 2015 Round 2A | Castlewellan | 1–07 – 1–15 | Mayobridge | Newry |
| 19:45 IST (UTC+1) | | | | Venue: Páirc Esler |

=== Round 2B ===
Round 2B sees the eight losing sides from Round 1 compete for a place in Round 3. The losing sides from this round will be eliminated from the competition.

| 20 August 2015 Round 2B | Bryansford | 3–07 – 1–08 | Saval | Burren |
| 20:00 IST (UTC+1) | | | | Venue: St Mary's Park |

| 22 August 2015 Round 2B | Annaclone | 0–07 – 0–12 | Ballyholland Harps | Hilltown |
| 14:00 IST (UTC+1) | | | | Venue: Clonduff Park |

| 22 August 2015 Round 2B | Longstone | 1–12 – 0–09 | RGU Downpatrick | Hilltown |
| 15:45 IST (UTC+1) | | | | Venue: Clonduff Park |

| 22 August 2015 Round 2B | Kilcoo | 8–24 – 1–06 | Clann na Banna | Castlewellan |
| 19:00 IST (UTC+1) | | | | Venue: St Malachy's Park |

== Round 3 ==
Round 3 is a supplementary round for teams to have a second chance at reaching the Quarter Final. This round features teams that have lost once so far in this year's Championship, either winning in Round 1 and losing in Round 2A, or losing in Round 1 but winning their Round 2B fixture. Losing sides in this round are eliminated from this year's competition.

This round is seeded, meaning in each fixture a Round 2A losing side will face a Round 2B winning side.

| 4 September 2015 Round 3 | Kilcoo | 0–12 – 0–07 | Glenn | Newry |
| | | | | Venue: Páirc Esler |

| 5 September 2015 Round 3 | Bryansford | 0–16 – 3–11 | Liatroim |

| 5 September 2015 Round 3 | Ballyholland Harps | 2–11 – 1–13 | Clonduff |

| 5 September 2015 Round 3 | Longstone | 1–13 – 3–15 | Castlewellan |

== Quarter Final ==
The Quarter Final sees the two brackets rejoin, with the earlier Round 2A winners facing a Round 3 winner for a Semi Final spot.

| 12 September 2015 Quarter Final | Warrenpoint | 2–06 – 0–20 | Castlewellan |

| 12 September 2015 Quarter Final | Burren | 1–09 – 2–07 | Kilcoo |

| 13 September 2015 Quarter Final | Rostrevor | 1–05 – 0–10 | Ballyholland Harps |

| 13 September 2015 Quarter Final | Mayobridge | 3–11 – 1–03 | Liatroim |

== Semi Final ==
The Semi Final will see the four winning sides face off for a place in this year's final. This round is an open draw from the four Quarter Final winners.

| 26 September 2015 Semi Final | Kilcoo | 2–09 – 1–07 | Mayobridge | Newry |
| | | | | Venue: Páirc Esler |

| 27 September 2015 Semi Final | Castlewellan | 1–13 – 0–08 | Ballyholland Harps | Newry |
| | | | | Venue: Páirc Esler |

== Final ==
The final will be played between the two Semi Final winners, and will take place at Páirc Esler, Newry.

| 11 October 2015 Final | Kilcoo | 3–10 – 0–11 | Castlewellan | Newry |
| | | | | Venue: Páirc Esler |
| | | Report |
