= 2022 Ulster Senior Club Football Championship =

Gaelic football competition

2022 Ulster Club Senior Football Championship
Tournament details
- Province: Ulster
- Year: 2022
- Trophy: Seamus McFerran Cup
- Sponsor: Allied Irish Banks
- Date: 5 November - 11 December 2022
- Teams: 9 (one from each of the 9 counties)
- Defending champions: Kilcoo

Winners
- Champions: Glen (1st win)
- Manager: Malachy O'Rourke
- Captain: Connor Carville
- Qualify for: All-Ireland Club SFC

Runners-up
- Runners-up: Kilcoo
- Manager: Conleith Gilligan
- Captain: Conor Laverty; Aidan Branagan

Other
- Matches played: 8
- Total scored: 24-179
- Top Scorer: Danny Tallon (Glen) (1-10)
- Website: Ulster GAA

The 2022 Ulster Senior Club Football Championship was the 54th instalment of the annual competition organised by Ulster GAA. It is one of the four provincial competitions of the 2022–23 All-Ireland Senior Club Football Championship.

Kilcoo from Down were the defending Ulster champions, having beaten Fermanagh's Derrygonnelly Harps in the 2021 final.

Derry champions Glen won their first Ulster title by beating Kilcoo in the final.

== Teams ==
The Ulster championship is contested by the winners of the nine county championships in the Irish province of Ulster. Ulster comprises the six counties of Northern Ireland, as well as Cavan, Donegal and Monaghan in the Republic of Ireland.

County	Team	Last win
Antrim	Erin's Own, Cargin	
Armagh	Crossmaglen Rangers	2015
Cavan	Gowna	
Derry	Watty Graham's, Glen	
Donegal	Naomh Conaill	
Down	Kilcoo	2021
Fermanagh	Enniskillen Gaels	
Monaghan	Ballybay Pearse Brothers	
Tyrone	Errigal Ciarán	2002

== Bracket ==
Preliminary round

Quarter-finals

Semi-finals

Final

Erin's Own, Cargin (Antrim)
2-13 (aet) (4)

Naomh Conaill (Donegal)
2-13 (aet) (1)

Erin's Own, Cargin (Antrim)
0-8

Glen (Derry)
1-10

Glen (Derry)
3-10

Errigal Ciarán (Tyrone)
1-12

Glen (Derry)
1-12

Kilcoo (Down)
1-6

Enniskillen Gaels (Fermanagh)
1-17 (aet) (5)

Gowna (Cavan)
2-14 (aet) (3)

Enniskillen Gaels (Fermanagh)
1-9

Kilcoo (Down)
3-14

Kilcoo (Down)
2-14

Crossmaglen Rangers (Armagh)
1-9

Ballybay Pearse Brothers (Monaghan)
1-7

Ballybay Pearse Brothers (Monaghan)
2-11

== Preliminary round ==
5 November 2022
19:15
Preliminary Round

Crossmaglen Rangers (Armagh)	1-9 – 2-11	Ballybay Pearse Brothers (Monaghan)
Rían O'Neill 1-1, Cian McConville 0-3 (0-2f), Caolan Finnegan 0-2, Ronan Fitzpatrick 0-2, Jamie Clarke 0-1,	Report	Shane McGuinness 1-2 (1-0 pen), Paul Finlay 0-4 (0-3f), Aaron Toner 1-0, Dessie Ward 0-2, Christopher McGuinness 0-1 (0-1m), Drew Wylie 0-1, Thomas Kerr 0-1

Athletic Grounds, Armagh
Referee: Noel Mooney

== Quarter-finals ==
13 November 2022
13:30
Quarter-final 1

Erin's Own, Cargin (Antrim)	2-13 – 2-13 (a.e.t.)	Naomh Conaill (Donegal)
Kevin McShane 1-1, Kieran Close 1-1, Pat Shivers 0-3, Tomas McCann 0-2, John McNabb 0-1 (0-1f), Michael McCann 0-1, Cahir Donnelly 0-1, Sean O'Neill 0-1, Jamie Gribbin 0-1, Eunan Quinn 0-1	Report	Jeaic McKelvey 0-5, Kieran Gallagher 1-1, John O'Malley 1-0, Charles McGuinness 0-2 (0-2f), Ciarán Thompson 0-2 (0-2f), Kevin McGettigan 0-1, Leo McLoone 0-1, Dermot Molloy 0-1
Penalties
Michael McCann; Tomas McCann; Pat Shivers; Cahir Donnelly	4–1	Ciarán Thompson; Charles McGuinness; Dermot Molloy

Corrigan Park, Belfast
Referee: Kevin Faloon

13 November 2022
15:30
Quarter-final 2

Glen (Derry)	3-10 – 1-12	Errigal Ciarán (Tyrone)
Alex Doherty 1-1, Conor Convery 1-0, Ethan Doherty 1-0, Emmett Bradley 0-2, Stevie O'Hara 0-2, Conor Glass 0-1 (0-1 45), Danny Tallon 0-1 (0-1f), Tiarnán Flanagan 0-1, Jack Doherty 0-1, Conleth McGuckian 0-1	Report	Tommy Canavan 1-4 (0-3f), Darragh Canavan 0-3 (0-1f), Ruairí Canavan 0-2, Peter Óg McCartan 0-2, Padraig McGirr 0-1, Mark Kavanagh 0-1

Celtic Park, Derry
Referee: Paul Faloon

12 November 2022
19:00
Quarter-final 3

Enniskillen Gaels (Fermanagh)	1-17 – 2-14 (a.e.t.)	Gowna (Cavan)
Conor Love 0-7 (0-2f), Callum Jones 1-2, John Reihill 0-4 (0-2f), Eoin Beacom 0-1 (0-1f), Conor Watson 0-1, Richard O'Callaghan 0-1, Ethan Beresford 0-1	Report	Cian Madden 0-5 (0-5f), Robbie Fitzpatrick 1-2, T. J. Fitzpatrick 1-0, Conor Madden 0-2 (0-1m), Conor Casey 0-2, Tiarnan Madden 0-1 (0-1f), Mark McKeever 0-1, Daire Madden 0-1
Penalties
Conor Love; Conor Watson; Eoin Beacom; John Reihill; Ciaran Smith	5–3	Cian Madden; Conor Casey; Oisin Pierson; Robbie Fitzpatrick

Brewster Park, Enniskillen
Referee: Niall McKenna

13 November 2022
13:30
Quarter-final 4

Kilcoo (Down)	2-14 – 1-7	Ballybay Pearse Brothers (Monaghan)
Paul Devlin 0-4 (0-3f, 0-1 45), Ryan Johnston 1-1, Miceal Rooney 1-0, Ryan McEvoy 0-2 (0-1f), Aaron Branagan 0-2, Ceilum Doherty 0-2, Jerome Johnston 0-1 (0-1m), Niall Kane 0-1 (0-1f), Conor Laverty 0-1	Report	Shane McGuinness 1-0 (1-0 pen), Paul Finlay 0-2 (0-1f), Thomas Kerr 0-1 (0-1 45), Dessie Ward 0-1 (0-1f), Colm Lennon 0-1, Ciarán Galligan 0-1, Aaron Toner 0-1

St Tiernach's Park, Clones
Referee: Niall Cullen

== Semi-finals ==
27 November 2022
13:30
Semi-final 1

Erin's Own, Cargin (Antrim)	0-8 – 1-10	Glen (Derry)
Tomas McCann 0-2 (0-2f), Pat Shivers 0-2 (0-1f, 0-1m), John McNabb 0-1 (0-1f), Kevin O’Boyle 0-1, Ciaran Bradley 0-1, G McCann 0-1	Report	Danny Tallon 1-4 (1-0 pen, 0-2f, 0-1m), Emmett Bradley 0-2 (0-2f), Conor Glass 0-2, Alex Doherty 0-1, Michael Warnock 0-1

Healy Park, Omagh
Referee: Kieran Eannetta

26 November 2022
18:00
Semi-final 2

Enniskillen Gaels (Fermanagh)	1-9 – 3-14	Kilcoo (Down)
Eoin Beacom 1-3 (0-1f), Richard O'Callaghan 0-2, Conor Love 0-1 (0-1f), Josh Horan 0-1, Conor Watson 0-1, John Reihill 0-1	Report	Shealan Johnston 2-1, Paul Devlin 0-4 (0-4f), Aaron Morgan 1-0, Darryl Branagan 0-2, Ceilum Doherty 0-2, Aaron Branagan 0-1 (0-1m), Miceal Rooney 0-1, Ryan Johnston 0-1, Conor Laverty 0-1, Eugene Branagan 0-1

Athletic Grounds, Armagh
Referee: Sean Hurson

== Final ==
11 December 2022
13:00
Final

Glen (Derry)	1-12 – 1-6	Kilcoo (Down)
Danny Tallon 0-5 (0-5f), Alex Doherty 1-0, Emmett Bradley 0-2 (0-2f), Conor Glass 0-1, Conleth McGuckian 0-1, Jack Doherty 0-1, Ryan Dougan 0-1, Ethan Doherty 0-1	Report	Aaron Branagan 1-1, Paul Devlin 0-2 (0-2f), Ryan McEvoy 0-1 (0-1f), Jerome Johnston 0-1 (0-1m), Darryl Branagan 0-1

Athletic Grounds, Armagh
Attendance: 5,398
Referee: Joe McQuillan

== Championship statistics ==
=== Top scorers ===
Overall

Rank	Player	Club	Tally	Total	Matches	Average
1	Danny Tallon	Glen	1-10	13	3	4.33
2	Paul Devlin	Kilcoo	0-10	10	3	3.33
3	Alex Doherty	Glen	2-2	8	3	2.67
3	Shane McGuinness	Ballybay Pearse Brothers	2-2	8	2	4.00
3	Conor Love	Enniskillen Gaels	0-8	8	2	4.00
6	Shealan Johnston	Kilcoo	2-1	7	3	2.33
6	Tommy Canavan	Errigal Ciarán	1-4	7	1	7.00
6	Eoin Beacom	Enniskillen Gaels	1-4	7	2	3.50
6	Aaron Branagan	Kilcoo	1-4	7	3	2.33
10	Paul Finlay	Ballybay Pearse Brothers	0-6	6	2	3.00
10	Emmett Bradley	Glen	0-6	6	3	2.00

In a single game

Rank	Player	Club	Tally	Total	Opposition
1	Shealan Johnston	Kilcoo	2-1	7	Enniskillen Gaels
1	Tommy Canavan	Errigal Ciarán	1-4	7	Glen
1	Danny Tallon	Glen	1-4	7	Erin's Own
1	Conor Love	Enniskillen Gaels	0-7	7	Gowna
5	Eoin Beacom	Enniskillen Gaels	1-3	6	Kilcoo
6	Shane McGuinness	Ballybay Pearse Brothers	1-2	5	Crossmaglen Rangers
6	Callum Jones	Enniskillen Gaels	1-2	5	Gowna
6	Robbie Fitzpatrick	Gowna	1-2	5	Enniskillen Gaels
6	Cian Madden	Gowna	0-5	5	Enniskillen Gaels
6	Jeaic Mac Ceallabhuí	Naomh Conaill	0-5	5	Erin's Own, Cargin
6	Danny Tallon	Glen	0-5	5	Kilcoo
