= 2017 Down Senior Football Championship =

2017 Down SFC
- Season: 2017
- Champions: Kilcoo (16th title)
- Relegated: Ballymartin; Bredagh
- Winning Captains: Darragh O'Hanlon and Daryl Branagan
- Man Of The Match: Dylan Ward
- Winning Manager: Paul McIver

The 2017 Down Senior Football Championship was the 109th official edition of Down GAA's premier gaelic football tournament for senior clubs in County Down. 16 teams compete with the winner representing Down in the Ulster Senior Club Football Championship.

The tournament operated a double elimination format for the opening two rounds of the championship, with the winners and early round losers rejoining at the quarter final stage.

Kilcoo Owen Roe's were the defending champions after they defeated Clonduff 3-11 to 0-9 in the 2016 final. On 1 October 2017 they successfully defended their title to claim a "6 in a row" of Down S.F.C. titles when defeating Burren 0-13 to 0-11. The final was broadcast live on TG4.

An Ríocht return to the senior grade after claiming the Down I.F.C. title in 2016. Bredagh make their senior comeback after breaking into the top 15 ranked teams in the Down football leagues for 2016.

Ballymartin and Bredagh are relegated to the 2018 I.F.C. after finishing outside the top 15 ranked teams in the Down football leagues for 2017. They finished 9th and 5th (ranked 21st and 17th overall) respectively in Division 2. Rostrevor and Carryduff will replace them after finishing 2nd and 3rd (ranked overall 14th and 15th) respectively in the Down ACFL Division 2 in 2017. Loughinisland gained a reprieve from relegation after finishing overall ranked 16th, however due to Rostrevor claiming the I.F.C. title, they were permitted to remain senior.

== Team changes ==
The following teams have changed division since the 2016 championship season.

=== To S.F.C. ===
Promoted from 2016 Down Intermediate Football Championship

- An Ríocht – (IFC Champions)
- Bredagh – (IFL Champions)

=== From S.F.C. ===
Relegated to 2017 Down Intermediate Football Championship

- Annaclone
- Rostrevor

== Round 1 ==
All 16 teams enter the competition in this round. The 8 winners progress to Round 2A while the 8 losers progress to Round 2B.

10 August 2017; 19:45; Round 1	St. Peter's Warrenpoint	0-13 – 0-8	Bryansford	Mayobridge
10 August 2017; 19:45; Round 1	Ross McGarry 0-4 (0-2f), Jamie Grant and Ryan Mallon 0-2 each, Ryan Boyle, John Boyle, Donagh McAleenan (0-1f), Niall McGovern, Aaron Magee 0-1 each	Report	Danny Savage 0-4 (0-2f), Timmy Hanna, Philip Bonny, David McKibben (0-1f), Packie Downey 0-1 each	Mayobridge

11 August 2017; 18:30; Round 1	Saval	0-21 – 2-14	Ballymartin	Pairc Esler
11 August 2017; 18:30; Round 1	Pat Havern 0-9 (0-7f), Keelan Rice and Niall Devlin (1 '45) 0-3 each, Curtis Sands and Eamonn Magee 0-2 each, Niall Madine and Brendan Turley 0-1 each		Ciaran O'Hare 0-6 (0-4f), Cathal Doyle 1-1, Peter Fitzpatrick 1-0, Ryan O'Hare 0-3, John Caldwell 0-2, Adrian Doran and Ross Cunningham 0-1 each	Pairc Esler

11 August 2017; 20:00; Round 1	Mayobridge	0-19 – 1-9	Longstone	Pairc Esler
11 August 2017; 20:00; Round 1	Cathal Magee 0-7 (0-1f), Benny Coulter 0-4, Conleth O'Hare 0-3, Caolan Gallagher 0-2, Ryan Brady, Kevin McClorey, Rory Hughes 0-1 each		Mark Poland 0-4f, Conor Poland 0-3 (0-1f, 1 ' 45), Ryan McDowell 1-0, Colin Burden and Barry Doran 0-1 each	Pairc Esler

12 August 2017; 15:45; Round 1	Russell Gaelic Union, Downpatrick	4-14 – 1-10	An Riocht	Castlewellan
12 August 2017; 15:45; Round 1	Ruairi Quinn 1-3, Johnny Bell, Sean Bell, Garret Trainor 1-1 each, Anthony Doherty (0-1f, 1 '45), Conor McGrady (0-2f), Jarlath Branagan (0-1f) 0-2 each, Taylor Louden and Neil Cunningham 0-1 each	Report	Noel McArdle 0-6 (0-5f), Rory Cunningham 1-1, Declan Doyle 0-2, James Colgan 0-1	Castlewellan

12 August 2017; 18:45; Round 1	Ballyholland	0-15 – 2-8	Loughinisland	St. Patrick's
12 August 2017; 18:45; Round 1	Patrick Quinn 0-6 (0-3f), Tony Havern 0-3, Ronan Murtagh 0-2, Patrick McAteer, Tiernan Rushe, Joe Murphy, M Walsh 0-1 each		John McCarthy 1-1 (0-1f), Dean McLaughlin 1-0, Stefan Mason 0-3 (0-1f), Rory Deegan, Jonny Flynn, Declan McClements, Aaron McClements	St. Patrick's

13 August 2017; 15:45; Round 1	Castlewellan	1-17 – 1-8	Bredagh	Downpatrick
13 August 2017; 15:45; Round 1			Benny Hasson 1-0	Downpatrick

13 August 2017; 20:00; Round 1	Kilcoo	0-14 – 1-10 (A.E.T.)	Clonduff	Pairc Esler
13 August 2017; 20:00; Round 1	Paul Devlin 0-4 (0-1f, 2 '45), Darragh O'Hanlon 0-3 (0-2f), Conor Laverty 0-2, Felim McGreevy, Aaron Morgan, Ceilum Doherty, Ryan Johnston, James McClean 0-1 each	Report	Stephen McConville 0-4 (0-2f), Conor Murray 1-0, Darren O'Hagan, Aidan Carr, Conor Og O'Hagan, Rian Brannigan, Shane Ward, James Killen 0-1 each	Pairc Esler

14 August 2017; 20:00; Round 1	Burren	4-17 – 0-12	Glenn John Martin	Clonduff
14 August 2017; 20:00; Round 1	Donal O'Hare 1-5 (0-3f), Shay McArdle 0-6 (3 '45), Ryan Treanor 1-1, Ciaran McGovern and Cathal Foy 1-0, Kevin McKernan 0-2, Conor Toner, Sean Murdock, Stevie Fegan 0-1 each		Stephen Clarke, Dylan Bagnall, Mattie Bagnall (0-2f), R Millar (1 '45), Cormac Clarke 0-2 each, M Turley and Tiarnan O'Brien 0-1 each	Clonduff

== Round 2 ==
=== Round 2A ===
The 8 winning teams from Round 1 enter this round. The 4 winners enter the draw for the quarter-finals while the 4 losers play in Round 3.

19 August 2017; 15:30; Round 2A	Russell Gaelic Union, Downpatrick	2-12 – 0-18	St. Peter's Warrenpoint	Castlewellan

19 August 2017; 17:00; Round 2A	Castlewellan	5-17 – 0-8	Saval	Pairc Esler
19 August 2017; 17:00; Round 2A	Rory Burns 2-1, Gareth McKibben 1-3 (0-1f), Sean Dornan 1-2, David Gilmore 1-1, Donal McKibben (0-1f) and Liam McKibben 0-3 each, Daniel Morgan 0-2, Colm Flanagan and Sean Hardy 0-1 each		Pat Havern 0-3 (0-1f), Daniel McCarthy 0-2, Chris Quinn, Keelan Rice, Niall Madine 0-1 each	Pairc Esler

21 August 2017; 18:45; Round 2A	Burren	4-12 – 0-9	Mayobridge	Pairc Esler
21 August 2017; 18:45; Round 2A	Conor Toner and Sean Murdock 1-1 each, Ryan Treanor and Eamonn Toner 1-0 each, Kevin McKernan 0-3, Cathal Foy, Shay McArdle (0-1f, 1 '45), Donal O'Hare (0-1f) 0-2 each, Jamie McGovern 0-1	Report	Cathal Magee 0-5 (0-2f), Benny Coulter and Caolan Gallagher 0-2 each	Pairc Esler

21 August 2017; 20:15; Round 2A	Kilcoo	2-7 – 0-6	Ballyholland	Pairc Esler
21 August 2017; 20:15; Round 2A	Dylan Ward and Eugene Branagan 1-0 each, Paul Devlin (0-1f) and Ceilum Doherty 0-2 each, Darragh O'Hanlon (0-1f), Martin Devlin, Conor Laverty 0-1 each		Ronan Murtagh 0-3f, Ruairi Campbell, Patrick Quinn (0-1f), Tiernan Rushe 0-1 each	Pairc Esler

23 August 2017; 19:00; Round 2A Replay	Russell Gaelic Union, Downpatrick	2-15 – 0-12	St. Peter's Warrenpoint	Kilcoo

=== Round 2B ===
The 8 losing teams from Round 1 enter this round. The 4 winners go into Round 3 while the 4 losing teams exit the championship.

17 August 2017; 20:15; Round 2B	Bryansford	2-17 – 0-6	An Riocht	Pairc Esler
17 August 2017; 20:15; Round 2B	Packie Downey 2-4, Danny Savage 0-6 (0-1f), Conor Maginn 0-3, David McKibben 0-2 (0-1f), Jack Maginn, Patrick Sheridan, Peter Brannigan 0-1 each	Report	Deaglan Morgan and Noel McArdle (0-1f) 0-2 each, Conor Clarke and Declan Doyle 0-1 each	Pairc Esler

18 August 2017; 20:15; Round 2B	Bredagh	0-9 – 0-8	Ballymartin	St. Patrick's

19 August 2017; 18:30; Round 2B	Clonduff	3-19 – 2-14 aet	Longstone	Pairc Esler
19 August 2017; 18:30; Round 2B	Conor Óg O'Hagan 2-3, Stephen McConville 0-9 (0-7f), Conor Murray 1-0, Shane Ward 0-2, Paul Lively, Jayme Gribben, Charlie Carr, Aidan Carr, Rian Branagan 0-1 each		Conor Smyth 1-2, Mark Poland 0-7f, Conor Poland 0-2 (0-1f), Ryan Kelly 1-0, Michael Ireland 0-2 (0-1f), Cormac Poland 0-1,	Pairc Esler

21 August 2017; 20:15; Round 2B	Loughinisland	1-11 – 0-13 (A.E.T.)	Glenn John Martin	St. Patrick's
21 August 2017; 20:15; Round 2B		Report		St. Patrick's

== Round 3 ==
This is the final qualifier round. The four losing teams from round 2A (who won a match and lost a match) play the four winning teams from round 2B (who lost a match and won a match).

25 August 2017; 20:00; Round 3	Ballyholland	2-7 – 0-10	Bredagh	St. Patrick's; Referee: Gavin Corrigan
25 August 2017; 20:00; Round 3	Ronan Murtagh 2-1 (0-1f), Joe Murphy and Tiernan Rushe 0-2 each		Donal Hughes 0-5 (0-3f), Kealan Devlin, Michael Robinson, Joe Shieds, Emmet Costello, Benny Hasson 0-1 each	St. Patrick's; Referee: Gavin Corrigan

26 August 2017; 18:30; Round 3	Bryansford	1-20 – 0-8	Saval	Clonduff; Referee: Ciaran Branagan
26 August 2017; 18:30; Round 3	Peter Sheridan 1-0, David McKibben (0-5f) and Danny Savage (0-2f) 0-6 each, Peter Brannigan and Packie Downey 0-2 each, Marc Reid (1 '45), Niall O'Higgins, Luke Kelly 0-1 each	Report	Niall Devlin 0-3, Keelan Rice and Oisin McEvoy 0-2 each, Philip Madine 0-1	Clonduff; Referee: Ciaran Branagan

27 August 2017; 19:30; Round 3	Mayobridge	1-12 – 0-13	Clonduff	Pairc Esler; Referee: Ciaran Mooney
27 August 2017; 19:30; Round 3	Kevin O'Rourke 0-7, Conleth O'Hare 1-0, Cathal Magee 0-2f, Benny Coulter, Conor Garvey, Rory Hughes 0-1 each		Stephen McConville 0-5 (0-2f), Aidan Carr (1 '45), Conor Óg O'Hagan, Shane Ward 0-2, Shane McGreevy and Lorcan Branagan 0-1 each	Pairc Esler; Referee: Ciaran Mooney

28 August 2017; 19:00; Round 3	Loughinsisland	1-11 – 1-10	St. Peter's Warrenpoint	Kilcoo; Referee: Adrian Sharvin
28 August 2017; 19:00; Round 3	Conor Megoran 1-0, Rory Deegan 0-2f, Stefan Mason (0-1f), Dan Gordon, Ryan Stranney, Rory Mason (0-1f) 0-1 each		Ryan Boyle 1-0, Ross McGarry and Donagh McAleenan 0-2, Niall McGovern and Ruairi Cowan 0-1 each	Kilcoo; Referee: Adrian Sharvin

== Quarter-finals ==
The 4 winners from Round 2A play the 4 winners from Round 3.

1 September 2017; 20:15	Burren	0-14 – 0-12	Mayobridge	Páirc Esler; Referee: Paul Faloon
1 September 2017; 20:15	Donal O'Hare 0-5 (0-3f), Kevin McKernan 0-4, Cathal Foy 0-2, Mark McKay, Conor Toner, Padraig Poland 0-1 each		Cathal Magee 0-7 (0-4f), Conor Garvey 0-2, Conleth O'Hare, Benny Coulter, Ryan Brady 0-1 each	Páirc Esler; Referee: Paul Faloon

2 September 2017; 15:30	Castlewellan	1-14 – 0-13	Loughinisland	Downpatrick; Referee: Con Reynolds
2 September 2017; 15:30	Daniel Morgan 0-8 (0-5f), Cathal Crilly 1-0, Liam McKibben 0-2, Colm Flanagan, Kevin Duffin, Donal McKibben, Gareth McKibbin (0-1f) 0-1 each	Report		Downpatrick; Referee: Con Reynolds

2 September 2017; 19:00	Russell Gaelic Union, Downpatrick	1-9 – 1-9	Ballyholland	Newcastle; Referee: Ciaran Mooney
2 September 2017; 19:00	Patrick Quinn 0-6 (0-2f), Jack Grant 1-0, Tiernan Rushe, Joe Murphy, Pat Havern 0-1 each		Johnny Bell 1-3, Jarlath Branagan and Conor McGrady (0-1f) 0-2 each, Anthony Doherty (0-1f) and Tommy McElroy 0-1 each	Newcastle; Referee: Ciaran Mooney

4 September 2017; 20:15	Kilcoo	2-13 – 0-11	Bryansford	Páirc Esler; Referee: Brendan Rice
4 September 2017; 20:15	Jerome Johnston 2-2, Ceilum Doherty, Martin Devlin, Donal Kane (0-1f) 0-2 each, Darragh O'Hanlon (0-1f), Daryl Branagan, Conor Laverty, JJ McLaughlin 0-1 each		David McKibben 0-7 (0-6f), Marc Reid (1 '45), Aaron McDonald, Ruairi Wells, Conor Maginn 0-1 each	Páirc Esler; Referee: Brendan Rice

6 September 2017; 19:00; Replay	Russell Gaelic Union, Downpatrick	1-9 – 0-11 aet	Ballyholland	Newcastle; Referee: Neill Cousins

== Semi-finals ==
15 September 2017; 20:15	Burren	1-12 – 0-7	Castlewellan	Pairc Esler; Referee: Ciaran Branagan
15 September 2017; 20:15	Conor Toner 1-0, Donal O'Hare 0-5 (0-3f), David McEntee and Ryan Treanor 0-2 each, Sean Murdock, Cathal Murdock, Declan Rooney 0-1 each		Sean Dornan 0-3, Colm Flanagan, Cathal Crilly, David Gilmore, Fintan McGreevy 0-1 each	Pairc Esler; Referee: Ciaran Branagan

16 September 2017; 17:15	Kilcoo	0-13 – 1-5	Russell Gaelic Union, Downpatrick	Pairc Esler; Referee: Ciaran Mooney
16 September 2017; 17:15	Paul Devlin 0-6 (0-4f, 1 '45), Martin Devlin 0-2, Daryl Branagan, Aaron Morgan, Conor Laverty, Ceilum Doherty, Gary McEvoy 0-1 each	Report	Micheal Magee 1-1 (0-1f), Anthony Doherty (1 '45), Jarlath Brannigan (0-1f), Jonathan Bell, Conor McGrady (0-1f) 0-1 each	Pairc Esler; Referee: Ciaran Mooney

== Final ==
1 October 2017; 3:00 pm Final	Kilcoo	0-13 – 0-11	Burren	Páirc Esler; Referee: Paul Faloon
1 October 2017; 3:00 pm Final	Dylan Ward and Paul Devlin (0-4f) 0-4 each, Jerome Johnston 0-2, Darragh O'Hanlon (0-1f), Aaron Morgan, Conor Laverty 0-1 each	Report	Donal O'Hare 0-6 (0-3f), Cathal Murdock 0-2 (0-1f, 1 '45), Ryan Treanor, Kevin McKernan, Daniel McCartan 0-1 each	Páirc Esler; Referee: Paul Faloon

== Last Eight ==
Quarter-Finals		Semi-Finals		Final
Burren	0-14
Mayobridge	0-12	Burren	1-12
Castlewellan	1-14	Castlewellan	0-7
Loughinisland	0-13			Kilcoo	0-13
Kilcoo	2-13			Burren	0-11
Bryansford	0-10	Kilcoo	0-13
Russell Gaelic Union, Downpatrick	1-9 (1-9 R)	Russell Gaelic Union, Downpatrick	1-5
Ballyholland	1-9 (0-11 R)
