= 2009 Down Senior Football Championship =

The 2009 Down Senior Football Championship was the 2009 instalment of the annual Gaelic football club championship in Down. The tournament is a straight knockout competition between the 16 elite clubs in Down. The 2008 holders of the championship were Mayobridge. The competition ran from 6 August to 4 October 2009.

== Tournament Qualification ==
The teams chosen to play in this competition are decided as follows:

- The 12 teams from the Down Division One in 2008.
- The 2 teams from Division Two that earned promotion.
- The winners of the Down Intermediate Football Championship in 2008.
- The 3rd placed team in Division Two. In the event the Intermediate Champions are in the top 3 of Division Two, then the 4th place team will also compete.

== Draw ==
First Round
Bryansford	1–9
Kilcoo	2–9
Mayobridge	1–19
Annaclone	2–5
Ballyholland	0–9
Burren	2–18
Saval	1–10
Castlewellan	1–9
Loughinisland	1–9
Warrenpoint	0–7
Clann na Banna	0–8
An Riocht	1–14
Clonduff	1–18
Rostrevor	1–6
Liatroim	0–14
Longstone	0–13

Quarter-finals
Kilcoo	1–10
Mayobridge	1–8
Burren	1–10
Saval	0–12
Loughinisland	0–10
An Riocht	0–8
Clonduff	2–10
Liatroim	1–9

Semi-finals
Kilcoo	0–12
Burren	0–10
Loughinisland	3–6
Clonduff	1–7

Final
Kilcoo	2–9
Loughinisland	1–4
