= Longstone GAC =

- Cloch Fhada
- Founded: 1945
- County: Down
- Nickname: The Stone
- Colours: Red, white and black
- Grounds: Longstone Park
- Coordinates: 54°06′35.77″N 5°55′58.87″W

Playing kits
Standard colours

Longstone GAC is a Gaelic Athletic Association club in Annalong, County Down, Northern Ireland. Set at the foot of the Mourne Mountains in the Lower Mourne parish, the club caters for Gaelic Football, Camogie, and more recently Ladies' Gaelic Football at underage level.

== History ==
=== Beginning ===
Although there was a Longstone team for a few years in the 1930s, the present Club was started in 1945. A collection was held at a dance and sufficient money was raised to purchase a football and hire a field from July to October. This field was on the Oldtown Lane and was owned by Joe McKibben.

After a number of practice matches among themselves and with the neighbouring 'Clinchers' from Brackney it was decided to hold a meeting and form a committee. No records were kept of this meeting but it is thought that the first Longstone committee consisted of:

- CHAIRMAN: Master Joe Doran
- SECRETARY: W. J. Fitzpatrick (the Poet)
- TREASURER: Eddie Burden
- MEMBERS: Charlie Quinn, Hugh Vincent Burden, Hugh Smith, Tom Trainor, Paddy Marks, Dan Quinn

This committee registered a team in the Frontier Junior League called Longstone Emmetts. The team wore red jerseys. Their first fixture was at home to Newry and the result was a draw. This game was played at Dennis' field on Matthews' Lane between Stewart's Road and the Valley Road in October 1945. Some of the 'Stone players on that day were: J. P. Phillips, Eddie Burden, Frank Carragher, Pa Quinn, Hugh Rodgers, Tom Trainor, Henry Pat McCartan, Owen Martin, T. G. Burden, Sean Doran, Felix McAlinden, Eddie Smith, James Fitzpatrick, Edward Cunningham, Seamus McVeigh, Charlie Rodgers, James Bernard Rodgers.

In 1947, Longstone were playing in the newly formed Intermediate League. Under the captaincy of Henry Pat McCartan, the team won this league at the first attempt. The captain and players were presented with the Fitzsimmons Cup and medals, by Rev. G. McCaul, C.C., at a ceili in Longstone Hall. The music was supplied by Longstone Ceili Band.

=== The 1950s ===
From winning the Intermediate League, Longstone advanced to the Senior League and in 1951, they finished as Runners-up to Newry.

In 1952, Longstone won a 7-a-side competition at Ballymartin and a Senior challenge match at Davitt's pitch in Belfast.

In 1953, the 'Stone won the 7-a-side competition at Dromara sports.

It was in the early '50s that Mal McEvoy joined the team at midfield.

In 1953, the club was honoured to have Major Vivion De Valera as their guest at the annual Aeríodheacht and sports. This event took place in Kevin's field on the Valley Road. Thousands attended to hear the oration and to watch a selection of Irish dancing, singing and football.

The major footballing achievement of the '50s for Longstone was reaching the Senior Championship final in 1955. This game was played against Ballymartin at St. Patrick's Park, Newcastle and was refereed by Pat Rooney of Castlewellan. Ballymartin won the game with the score 4–8 to 0–5.

In 1958, Longstone's new park (the present pitch) was formally opened by Mr. Seamus McFerran, the former President of the G.A.A. The field cost £1,000 and most of the work needed to convert it from its old moor state was done by voluntary labour. The main events on the day were: Senior Challenge, DOWN v. ARMAGH. This was refereed by Barney Carr and ended with a win for Armagh. In a Senior 7-a-side competition in which 6 teams took part. Longstone defeated Glasdrumman in the final.

Despite the enthusiasm attached to the pitch opening, Longstone could not survive in the senior league and were relegated in the late '50s.

=== The 1960s ===
Having been relegated for the first time, Longstone was now playing in the Junior leagues. Despite this, the Cassidy Cup in the Kilkeel tournament was won for three years in succession.

At this time the club had changed its colours to blue and white.

The club had little success on the playing field until the latter part of the decade.

In 1967, a Longstone team defeated Kilcoo in the final of the Ballymartin tournament to win the Home Produce Cup.

In 1968, Longstone won the Junior League by beating Warrenpoint in the final.

=== The 1970s ===
At a committee meeting on 3 January 1974, a motion, that the club colours be changed from blue and white to the original red and white, was carried.

During the '70s the team was having an uneventful time on the field but slowly facilities at Longstone were set to improve.

In September 1976, the committee first talked about re-seeding and draining the pitch; building a new hall, dressing rooms and showers and the purchase of a minibus.

In November 1976, floodlights were erected on the left-hand side of the pitch, allowing training to continue on winter evenings.

In 1977, the club purchased its first minibus and the senior team gained promotion to Division 2 and senior football after a 20-year absence.

Also in 1977, the President of the G.A.A., Con Murphy from Cork, visited Longstone as part of his tour of Down clubs.

In 1977, Longstone saw the rise of a new star, namely Ambrose, when he represented Longstone on the winning Down Minor All-Ireland team.

In 1978, Hugh Trainor represented the club when he captained Down in the All-Ireland U-21 Final at Croke Park.

In June 1978, floodlights were erected on the right-hand side of the field. This enabled the team to have practice matches on dark evenings.

1979 saw the old hall get a face-lift. A new wall was built and the interior modernised.

The highlight of 1979 was the senior team reaching the Junior Championship Final against Attical, with Attical winning 2–7 to 1–6.

=== The 1980s ===
In 1982, the senior team regained promotion to Division 1.

1983 saw major redevelopments of the football pitch. It was reseeded and drained. New dug outs were built as was a wall round the field.

In 1984, the hall was destroyed by fire. Almost immediately a massive fund raising effort began in order to replace the building.

In November 1985, the new hall was officially opened by Longstone's oldest member, 91-year-old Amby Rogers.

In 1986, Longstone had a great Senior Championship campaign culminating in a Final appearance with Burren as opponents. Having been Champions in '83, '84, and '85, Burren's experience was too much for Longstone, with the final score being Burren 0–13, Longstone 0–7. This Burren team then went on to lift the All-Ireland title later that year. The Longstone panel was: Bernard Rooney, Emmett Haughian, Conrad Haughian, John Curran, John Poland, Michael Poland, Francis Lavery, Hugh Trainor, Hugh L. Rogers, Paul Trainor, Ambrose Rogers (Capt.), Raphael Haughian, Geoffrey McDowell, Damien Poland, Paul Burden, Raymond Annett, Noel Haughian, Wilfred Rogers, Martin Burden, Liam Burden, Joe Blair, Michael Curran. The team were managed by Paul Lambe.

In 1987, Ambrose Rogers went Stateside with the All-Stars. In the same year Raphael and Noel Haughian won All-Ireland Minor Championship medals when the Down team defeated Cork in the final. One week later, Reserve team was in the Championship Final making it the club's second final within twelve months. They were, however, narrowly, beaten by Shamrocks. Longstone's Panel: Martin Smith, Adrian Haughian, Wilfred Rogers, Brendan McDowell, Michael Haughian, Thomas McCartan (Sr.), Thomas McCartan (Jr.), Joe Blair, Peter Trainor (Capt.), Paul Rogers, Martin Fitzpatrick, Charlie Cunningham, Brian Trainor, Liam Burden, Joey Annett, Martin Burden, John Pat Trainor, Paul Trimble, Eugene Cunningham, Terry Trainor, Michael Curran. The team were managed by Thomas McCartan.

=== The 1990s ===
In the early '90s, Longstone faced the prospect of relegation to Division 2. They needed a point against League Champions Burren in the final match of the season to stay up. In a nerve-wrecking game, the 'Stone showed their spirit and clawed and scraped for every ball, while a bit of luck was needed in the 3rd minute of injury time as a Burren free sailed wide and the 'Stone had won the right to a play-off for their Division 1 status. Then followed two vital play-off matches, against Clonduff and Carryduff, both of which Longstone won.

1991 saw the return of silverware to the Longstone Club. Under the management of Thomas McCartan (Snr.) and Finbar Cotter, the Longstone Reserves overcame the strong challenge of their Ballyholland counterparts to win the Father Davies Shield. The captain of the victors, Michael Haughian, lifted the shield in Petit Park, Rostrevor, in front of a huge Longstone following. The victory, although narrow, was deserved and it was the typical poaching style of the forwards which sealed it for Longstone, with a spectacular goal late in the second half. Longstone Panel: Martin Burden, Michael Haughian (Capt.), Niall Rogers, Wilfred Rogers, Joseph Blair, Thomas McCartan (Jnr.), Adrian Haughian, Denis Cotter, Brendan McDowell, John Poland, Michael Curran, Emmett Haughian (Jr.), Christopher Burden, Eamon Kelly, Brendan Trainor, John Trainor, Terry Trainor, Kieran Rooney, Peter Trainor (Snr.), Aquinas Haughian, Eugene Cunningham, Paul Trimble.

Ambrose Rogers did the Longstone Club proud in 1991 when he realised his lifelong ambition and won his All-Ireland Senior Football Championship Medal.

In June '93, the 'Stone won the Feis an Dúin Senior Sevens at St. Patrick's Park, Newcastle, and represented Down in the All-Ireland Kilmacud Crokes Sevens.

On 26 September 1993, at Páirc Esler, Longstone defeated Carryduff 2–6 to 0–9 to win the Reserve Football Championship, recording a win after multiple loses at finals. The cup was presented to the twenty-year-old captain, Denis Cotter, and paraded in front of celebrating supporters. Following the significant win, a victory dinner and celebration were held in Longstone Hall. Longstone Panel: Wilfred Rogers, Michael Haughian, Niall Rogers, Barry Kelly, Thomas McCartan, Shane Rogers, Denis Cotter (Capt.), Michael Curran, Brendan McDowell, Garry Rogers, Aquinas Haughian, Kieran Rooney, Hugh Trainor, John Trainor, Peter Trainor, Eugene Cunningham, Mark O'Reilly, Paddy Mallon, Joey Annett, Paul Trimble, Conleth Sloan, Liam Rooney, Martin Burden, Mark Murphy.

In 1995, the club held its Féile 50 and was held over a two-week festival at the Longstone Hall and pitch. There was a lot that happened, with the annual sports, and an exhibition that was open for viewing throughout the fortnight. This was officially opened by Jack Boothman, the then President of the G.A.A., who also unveiled a commemorative plaque as well. There was also a quiz, hosted by UTV's Frank Mitchell. The tournament was a big success, being sponsored by Bank of Ireland. The eventual winners were An Ríocht.

Over the next couple of years, the 'Stone were plying their trade in Division 2 but in 1998 they annexed the ACFL Division 2 title at Ballymartin where they defeated an Annaclone side who overcame Longstone in the two league games between the sides that year. Longstone ran out winners.

The same year, an amalgamation of Longstone and Ballymartin reached the U-16 Championship final at Rostrevor but came up against a strong Mayobridge team, who contained a couple of players that would go on to greater things with club and county.

In 1999 Ambrose Rogers Sr. died from a heart attack, resulting in a huge loss for the team and club as he was remembered respectably and fondly by the Longstone community. In the same year, the club also lost two of its founder members, Tom Trainor and T. G. Burden.

Mark Doran also gained an All-Ireland Minor winners medal in 1999. In the replayed Ulster final versus Donegal and the All-Ireland semi-final against Dublin at Navan, he played at right half back and left corner back.

The same year the 'Stone were relegated to Division 2 after a brief stay in Division 1, losing out in the play-offs.

=== 2000–present ===
In 2000, Longstone competed in Division 2 following a loss in the promotion play-offs. While the senior team remained in the second division, the under-15 squad won the Down and Ulster Óg Sport titles. They defeated An Ríocht in the Down final at Downpatrick before advancing to the Ulster tournament at St. Oliver Plunkett Park in Crossmaglen. There, they defeated Derrygonnelly, Glenties, and Killeshil to secure the title.

The hall underwent major redevelopments, and the addition of 2 more changing rooms and a sports hall were made. The top tier of the hall was modernised, and the Sports hall was aptly named after the all-time great, Ambrose Rogers.

2001 saw the return of Longstone to a major championship final after 9 years, under the guidance of P. J. Magee, when the Senior team won through to the Intermediate decider against a strong Warrenpoint side. But it was not to be as Warrenpoint walked out of Páirc Esler with the W. J. Farrell Cup. P. J. Magee said after the final, "You have to learn how to lose a final before you win one". How true he proved to be!

The team returned to the Intermediate Final in 2002, and went in as underdogs against Saval. The Saval side had won the league title and were looking to add the Championship for a double. The pain of the previous season's defeat spurred the 'Stone on and we ran out easy winners on a scoreline of 1–13 to 1–7. When the final whistle sounded at St. Patrick's Park, Newcastle, there was a sea of red and white all over the pitch’. Subsequently, Longstone gained promotion alongside Saval, where they remained for many years after. The U-21 team suffered defeat in the County Championship to Kilcoo, after winning the South Down competition.

In 2003, Longstone won the Castlewellan Sevens tournament for the first time in the club's history. The 'Stone had a strong team under the captaincy of Michael Higgins. Barry Doran picked up the Player of the Tournament on the same day. The U-21 team avenged last season's defeat to win the County Championship against Bryansford on a scoreline of 0–13 to 0–10. The minors won the SD League, beating An Ríocht in the final. The U-16 team lost in the final of the SD League to Mayobridge. The redevelopments of the pitch made it a pitch to be proud of when new perimeter walls, ballstops, goalposts and a new electrical scoreboard were installed. The pitch was also lengthened by a few metres, showing the club's giant leap into the future.

2004 showed that the club's newly found success wasn't a one-off, as the Sevens team got to the final of the Castlewellan Sevens, only to be beaten by St. Gall's of Antrim. This earned an invitation to the Kilmacud Sevens, but the team failed to make it out of the group. The Reserve team were shocked by a decision in Tullylish, which allowed the 'Stone to advance to the ACPRL Division 1. The U-21 team suffered defeated in the SD Final, and the Minors suffered defeat in the SD League Final.

In 2005, the Senior team avoided the relegation play-offs a week after their fixture schedule finished, as a result elsewhere kept the 'Stone in the top flight for another season. The Sevens team won the Castlewellan Sevens for the second time in three years, and got to the semi-finals in the Kilmacud Sevens. The U-12 team made the final of the 'B' Championship, which shows some great prospects for the future. The redevelopments of the pitch resumed, with the fencing around the field being replaced and the dug outs being replaced, yet another sign of the club's continuing ambitions for the future.

2006 saw one of the club's most successful seasons in senior football. In the ACFL Div 1, Longstone reached the final, only to be cruelly denied the title in the closing minutes after conceding a late goal. This showed a great improvement from the previous year, as the club were locked in a relegation battle previously. The Sevens team continued their success through from the previous season by winning the Castlewellan Sevens tournament yet again, and went one better at Kilmacud by reaching the final, only to be denied by a penalty shoot-out. The minor team were also beaten in the final minutes by a late goal in the final of the MFC B competition. The U-16 team picked up more silverware for the club, winning an Invitational Sevens tournament in Belfast.

2007 yielded more finals for the club. The seniors reached the SFC final for the first time in 21 years, only to be defeated in a replay by holders Mayobridge, with the sky blues needing a late goal to lift the title. The Sevens team went one step further in Dublin this year, beating St Galls in the final of the Kilmacud Crokes All-Ireland 7s competition. The U-16 football team lost in the final of the league to a strong Attical/Glasdrumman team. The Camogie team lost in the Division 4 league championship final, while the U-16 Camogie team lost in the league final to Ballycran, after a replay. The club continued to run their annual underage tournaments, with U-14, U-12 and U-10 competing in Longstone Park, while on another day, the U-8s enjoyed a day of indoor football due to heavy rainfall on the day of the tournament. This year, the pitch saw more redevelopments, with the sides of the pitch receiving a facelift, with concreted standing areas added.

In 2017, the club were relegated from the top tier, the ACFL Division One, ending a run of fifteen consecutive years at the top level. The 2018 season in Division Two began in the knowledge that due to restructuring of the league system for the next two seasons, that only one team would be promoted from Division Two in 2018 and 2019, instead of the usual two. In both seasons, Longstone finished 2nd in the league, missing out on promotion to Loughinisland and Carryduff respectively. The 2019 Down SFC saw the Stone qualify for the quarter-final for the first time since reaching the semi-final in 2014, but lost to eventual finalists Warrenpoint. The 2020 league season went unfinished due to the COVID-19 pandemic, and the club were eliminated in Round 3 of the 2020 Down SFC, again for the second season in succession by eventual finalists, this time being Carryduff.

In 2021, there were two promotion places available in Division Two for the first time since 2017. Going into the final day of the season, Longstone, holding second place, needed just a draw against third place Castlewellan, due to leading them by two points in the league. With the Stone leading the match by two points heading into stoppage time, Castlewellan scored a heartbreaking goal to win the match by a single point, leapfrogging the Stone into second place by way of a head-to-head tiebreaker.

== Recent Seasons ==
Season	Division	Pos.	Championship	Round
2014	ACFL Division One	10/16	SFC	SF
2015	ACFL Division One	11/16	SFC	R3
2016	ACFL Division One	10/12	SFC	R3
2017	ACFL Division One	11/12	SFC	R2
2018	ACFL Division Two	2/12	SFC	R2
2019	ACFL Division Two	2/11	SFC	QF
2020	ACFL Division Two	Cancelled	SFC	R3
2021	ACFL Division Two	3/12	SFC	R3
2022	ACFL Division Two	1/10	SFC	R2
2023	ACFL Division One	10/10	SFC	R3
2024	ACFL Division Two	7/10	SFC	R2
2025	ACFL Division Two	8/10	IFC	TBC

== Honours ==
Title	Wins	Years won
Down Intermediate Football Championship	1	2002
Down ACFL Division 2	2	1997, 2022
Castlewellan All-Ireland 7s	3	2003, 2005, 2006
Kilmacud Crokes All-Ireland 7s	1	2007
Down Senior Feis 7s	1	1993
Down Reserve Football Championship	1	1993
Down U-21 Football Championship	2	2002 2003
South Down U-16 League	1	2008

== Notable players ==
- Mark Poland Former Down Footballer
- Ambrose Rogers (Junior) Former Down Football Caption
- Mark Doran Former Down Footballer
- Ambrose Rogers (Senior) Former Down Footballer
- Conor Poland Current Down Footballer
- Finn McElroy Current Down Footballer
- Bernard Rooney Jnr

End of list

== See also ==
- Down Senior Club Football Championship
- List of Gaelic Athletic Association clubs
- An Riocht
- Bredagh GAC
- Castlewellan GAC
- Clonduff GAC
- Kilcoo GAC
- John Mitchel GFC
- Newry Bosco GFC
- Warrenpoint GAA
