= 2021 Down Senior Football Championship =

Tournament details
- County: Down
- Province: Ulster
- Year: 2021
- Trophy: Frank O'Hare Cup
- Sponsor: Morgan Fuels
- Teams: 16
- Defending champions: Kilcoo

Winners
- Champions: Kilcoo (19th title)
- Qualify for: 2021 Ulster Club SFC

Runners-up
- Runners-up: St Mary's Burren

The 2021 Down Senior Football Championship was the 113th official edition of Down GAA's premier Gaelic Football tournament for senior clubs in County Down. 16 teams competed with the winner representing Down in the Ulster Senior Club Football Championship. The tournament operated a double elimination format for the opening two rounds of the championship, with the winners and early round losers rejoining at the quarter final stage.

Kilcoo were the holders after defeating Carryduff in the 2020 final, and retained the title following their victory in the 2021 final against St Mary's Burren.

== Team changes ==
The following teams have changed division since the 2020 championship season.

=== To S.F.C. ===
Promoted from 2020 Down I.F.C.

- Saul (2020 Down Intermediate Football Champions)

=== From S.F.C. ===
Relegated to 2021 Down I.F.C.

- Darragh Cross (Lost 2020 Relegation Play-off)

–

== Participating teams ==
The following teams take part in the 2021 edition of the Down Senior Football Championship. –

Division One

Ballyholland Harps (semi-final)
Bryansford (Round 2B)
Burren (final)
Carryduff (quarter-final)
Clonduff (semi-final)
Kilcoo (champions)
Loughinisland (Round 2B)
Mayobridge (quarter-final)
Rostrevor (Round 2B)
Warrenpoint (Round 3)

Division Two

Bredagh (Round 3)
Castlewellan (Round 3)
Glenn (quarter-final)
Longstone (Round 3)
RGU Downpatrick (quarter-final)
Saul (Round 2B)

== Round 1 ==
The 16 participating teams were placed into an open draw. Winning sides move to Round 2A while losing sides go into Round 2B.

16 September 2021 Round 1	Longstone	1–05 – 0–07	Warrenpoint	Ballymartin
19:30 IST (UTC+1)				Venue: Páirc Cois na Farraige
				Referee: Brian Higgins

17 September 2021 Round 1	Saul	1–08 – 3–21	Burren	Liatroim
19:30 IST (UTC+1)				Venue: Fontenoy Park
				Referee: Colm Gribben

18 September 2021 Round 1	Bredagh	1–14 – 1–11	Castlewellan	Downpatrick
13:30 IST (UTC+1)				Venue: Páirc Tomás Ruséil
				Referee: Micheal Moore

18 September 2021 Round 1	RGU Downpatrick	3–08 – 0–13	Carryduff	Darragh Cross
17:00 IST (UTC+1)				Venue: St Mochai's Park
				Referee: Paul Faloon

19 September 2021 Round 1	Mayobridge	1–12 – 4–09	Kilcoo	Newry
15:00 IST (UTC+1)				Venue: Páirc Esler
				Referee: Darren O Hare

19 September 2021 Round 1	Loughinisland	0–12 – 2–09	Ballyholland Harps	Newcastle
17:00 IST (UTC+1)				Venue: St Patrick's Park
				Referee: Ciarán Branagan

19 September 2021 Round 1	Clonduff	3–10 – 1–07	Rostrevor	Newry
19:00 IST (UTC+1)				Venue: Páirc Esler
				Referee: Adrian Sharvin

20 September 2021 Round 1	Bryansford	0–13 – 1–14	Glenn	Newry
19:15 IST (UTC+1)				Venue: Páirc Esler
				Referee: Brendan Rice

== Round 2 ==
=== Round 2A ===
Round 2A will feature the eight winning sides from Round 1, with an open draw to determine the fixtures. The winning sides progress directly to the quarter final, with the losing sides moving into Round 3.

25 September 2021 Round 2A	RGU Downpatrick	4–07 – 1–08	Longstone	Dundrum
17:00 IST (UTC+1)				Venue: Páirc Sean O'Caoilte
				Referee: Darren O Hare

26 September 2021 Round 2A	Clonduff	1–08 – 1–11	Kilcoo	Newry
15:00 IST (UTC+1)				Venue: Páirc Esler
				Referee: Brendan Rice

26 September 2021 Round 2A	Bredagh	1–11 – 2–10	Ballyholland Harps	Castlewellan
17:00 IST (UTC+1)				Venue: St Malachy's Park
				Referee: Micheal Moore

27 September 2021 Round 2A	Glenn	0–08 – 2–12	Burren	Newry
19:15 IST (UTC+1)				Venue: Páirc Esler
				Referee: Gavin Finnegan

=== Round 2B ===
Round 2B sees the eight losing sides from Round 1 compete for a place in Round 3. The losing sides from this round will be eliminated from the competition.

24 September 2021 Round 2B	Carryduff	3–20 – 2–10	Saul	Liatroim
19:15 IST (UTC+1)				Venue: Fontenoy Park
				Referee: Peter Owens

25 September 2021 Round 2B	Loughinisland	0–14 – 1–19 (a.e.t.)	Mayobridge	Newcastle
15:00 IST (UTC+1)				Venue: St Patrick's Park
				Referee: Ciarán Branagan

25 September 2021 Round 2B	Castlewellan	1–15 – 0–17	Rostrevor	Ballymartin
19:15 IST (UTC+1)				Venue: Páirc Cois na Farraige
				Referee: Declan Ryan

26 September 2021 Round 2B	Warrenpoint	0–12 – 0–03	Bryansford	Newry
19:15 IST (UTC+1)				Venue: Páirc Esler
				Referee: Paul Faloon

=== Relegation Semi-finals ===
The 4 losers of Round 2B play each other in the Relegation Semi-finals. The 2 winners will secure their Senior status for 2022, while the 2 losers will face-off in the Relegation Final.

10 October 2021 Relegation Play-Off Semi Final	Rostrevor	2–09 – 1–13	Saul	Castlewellan
13:00 IST (UTC+1)				Venue: St Malachy's Park
				Referee: Micheal Moore

10 October 2021 Relegation Play-Off Semi Final	Loughinisland	0–11 – 0–09	Bryansford	Drumnaquoile
13:00 IST (UTC+1)				Venue: Pairc Naomh Eoin
				Referee: Kevin Mc Grath

=== Relegation Final ===
The winner of the Relegation Final will maintain their Senior status into 2022, while the loser will be relegated to the 2022 Down I.F.C.

17 October 2021 Relegation Play-Off Final	Rostrevor	0–12 – 0–15	Bryansford	Kilkeel
13:00 IST (UTC+1)				Venue: An Ríocht GAC
				Referee: Paul Faloon

Rostrevor relegated to 2022 Down Intermediate Football Championship

== Round 3 ==
Round 3 is a supplementary round for teams to have a second chance at reaching the quarter final. This round features teams that have lost once so far in this year's Championship, either winning in Round 1 and losing in Round 2A, or losing in Round 1 but winning their Round 2B fixture. Losing sides in this round are eliminated from this year's competition.

This round is seeded, meaning in each fixture a Round 2A losing side will face a Round 2B winning side.

1 October 2021 Round 3	Bredagh	2–06 – 4–08	Mayobridge	Liatroim
19:15 IST (UTC+1)				Venue: Fontenoy Park
				Referee: Ronan Barry

2 October 2021 Round 3	Longstone	1–11 – 2–13	Carryduff	Newcastle
16:00 IST (UTC+1)				Venue: St Patrick's Park
				Referee: Neill Cousins

3 October 2021 Round 3	Clonduff	3–10 – 1–09	Warrenpoint	Newry
19:15 IST (UTC+1)				Venue: Páirc Esler
				Referee: Paul Faloon

4 October 2021 Round 3	Glenn	2–12 – 1–13	Castlewellan	Newry
19:15 IST (UTC+1)				Venue: Páirc Esler
				Referee: Ciarán Branagan

== Quarter-final ==
The quarter final sees the two brackets rejoin, with the earlier Round 2A winners facing a Round 3 winner for a Semi Final spot.

9 October 2021 Quarter Final	Kilcoo	1–18 – 3–11 (a.e.t.)	Carryduff	Newry
17:00 IST (UTC+1)				Venue: Páirc Esler
				Referee: Brendan Rice

10 October 2021 Quarter Final	RGU Downpatrick	0–12 – 1–15	Clonduff	Newry
15:00 IST (UTC+1)				Venue: Páirc Esler
				Referee: Adrian Sharvin

10 October 2021 Quarter Final	Burren	1–15 – 2–08	Mayobridge	Newry
19:15 IST (UTC+1)				Venue: Páirc Esler
				Referee: Ciarán Branagan

11 October 2021 Quarter Final	Ballyholland Harps	2–08 – 0–11	Glenn	Newry
19:15 IST (UTC+1)				Venue: Páirc Esler
				Referee: Brian Higgins

== Semi-final ==
The semi final will see the four winning sides face off for a place in this year's final. This round is an open draw from the four Quarter Final winners.

24 October 2021 Semi Final	Kilcoo	0–08 – 1–03	Ballyholland Harps	Newry
15:00 IST (UTC+1)				Venue: Páirc Esler
				Referee: Brian Higgins

24 October 2021 Semi Final	Burren	0–09 – 0–08	Clonduff	Newry
19:15 IST (UTC+1)				Venue: Páirc Esler
				Referee: Adrian Sharvin

== Final ==
The final will be played between the two Semi Final winners, and will take place at Páirc Esler, Newry.

7 November 2021 Final	Kilcoo	1–12 – 0–13	Burren	Newry
15:00 IST (UTC+1)				Venue: Páirc Esler
				Referee: Brendan Rice
