= 2019 Down Senior Football Championship =

Tournament details
- County: Down
- Province: Ulster
- Year: 2019
- Trophy: Frank O'Hare Cup
- Sponsor: Morgan Fuels
- Teams: 16
- Defending champions: St. Mary's Burren

Winners
- Champions: Kilcoo (17th Title)
- Qualify for: Ulster Club SFC

Promotion/Relegation
- Relegated team(s): An Ríocht; Saval

The 2019 Down Senior Football Championship was the 111th official edition of Down GAA's premier Gaelic Football tournament for senior clubs in County Down. 16 teams competed with the winner representing Down in the Ulster Senior Club Football Championship. The tournament operated a double elimination format for the opening two rounds of the championship, with the winners and early round losers rejoining at the quarter-final stage.

Bredagh made their return to the senior grade after claiming the Down I.F.C. title in 2018.

St. Mary's Burren were the holders after they ended Kilcoo's run of six titles in a row, defeating the then defending champions on a scoreline of 2–12 to 2–09 in the 2018 final. They were unable to defend their title however, as they were eliminated in the quarter-final, losing to last year's finalists Kilcoo after a replay.

An Ríocht and Saval were relegated to the 2020 I.F.C. after finishing outside the top 15 ranked teams in the Down football leagues for 2018. They finished 5th and 8th (ranked 16th and 19th overall) in Division 2 respectively. Glenn John Martin's and Darragh Cross will replace them after they claimed the 2019 I.F.C. title and finished 4th (ranked 15th overall) in Division 2 respectively.

== Team changes ==
The following teams have changed division since the 2018 championship season.

=== To S.F.C. ===
Promoted from 2018 Down I.F.C.

- Bredagh - (I.F.C. Champions)

=== From S.F.C. ===
Relegated to 2019 Down I.F.C.

- Glenn John Martin's - (5th in Div. 2 F.L.; ranked 17th overall in Down F.L.)

== Participating teams ==
The following teams took part in the 2019 edition of the Down Senior Football Championship. –

Division One

- Ballyholland Harps (semi-final)
- Bryansford (Round 3)
- Burren (quarter-final)
- Castlewellan (Round 2B)
- Clonduff (semi-final)
- Kilcoo (champions)
- Loughinisland (Round 3)
- Mayobridge (quarter-final)
- RGU Downpatrick (Round 2B)
- Rostrevor (Round 3)
- Warrenpoint (final)

Division Two

- An Riocht (Round 2B)
- Bredagh (Round 3)
- Carryduff (quarter-final)
- Longstone (quarter-final)
- Saval (Round 2B)

== Round 1 ==
The 16 participating teams were placed into an open draw. Winning sides moved to Round 2A while losing sides went into Round 2B.

8 August 2019 Round 1	Clonduff	5–09 – 3–06	Saval	Newry
20:00 IST (UTC+1)				Venue: Páirc Esler
				Referee: Brendan Rice

9 August 2019 Round 1	Carryduff	1–12 – 0–11	Castlewellan	Newcastle
20:00 IST (UTC+1)				Venue: St Patrick's Park
				Referee: Ronan Barry

9 August 2019 Round 1	Kilcoo	1–11 – 0–05	An Riocht	Burren
20:00 IST (UTC+1)				Venue: St Mary's Park
				Referee: Ciaran Mooney

10 August 2019 Round 1	Longstone	1–15 – 0–23	Loughinisland	Castlewellan
15:30 IST (UTC+1)				Venue: St Malachy's Park
				Referee: Gavin Finnegan

11 August 2019 Round 1	Warrenpoint	2–07 – 0–11	Ballyholland Harps	Newry
18:30 IST (UTC+1)				Venue: Páirc Esler
				Referee: Con Reynolds

11 August 2019 Round 1	Burren	0–19 – 2–14 (a.e.t.)	Mayobridge	Newry
20:00 IST (UTC+1)				Venue: Páirc Esler
				Referee: Ciarán Branagan

12 August 2019 Round 1	Rostrevor	2–06 – 0–08	RGU Downpatrick	Hilltown
19:30 IST (UTC+1)				Venue: Clonduff Park
				Referee: Darren O'Hare

12 August 2019^{[a]} Round 1	Bryansford	0–12 – 2–10	Bredagh	Kilcoo
19:30 IST (UTC+1)				Venue: Páirc Eoghan Rua
				Referee: Oliver Burke

^{a} Game was originally scheduled for 10 August, but was postponed due to adverse weather conditions. The game was moved to 12 August.

== Round 2 ==
=== Round 2A ===
Round 2A featured the eight winning sides from Round 1, with an open draw to determine the fixtures. The winning sides progress directly to the quarter-final, with the losing sides moving into Round 3.

23 August 2019 Round 2A	Bredagh	0–11 – 1–10	Carryduff	Liatroim
19:30 IST (UTC+1)				Venue: Fontenoy Park
				Referee: Paul Faloon

24 August 2019 Round 2A	Mayobridge	2–16 – 1–18 (a.e.t.)	Loughinisland	Castlewellan
15:30 IST (UTC+1)				Venue: St Malachy's Park
				Referee: Brendan Rice

25 August 2019 Round 2A	Warrenpoint	0–19 – 1–10	Clonduff	Mayobridge
18:00 IST (UTC+1)				Venue: St Patrick's Park
				Referee: Ronan Barry

26 August 2019 Round 2A	Kilcoo	1–12 – 0–12	Rostrevor	Newry
20:00 IST (UTC+1)				Venue: Páirc Esler
				Referee: Con Reynolds

=== Round 2B ===
Round 2B saw the eight losing sides from Round 1 compete for a place in Round 3. The losing sides from this round were eliminated from the competition.

22 August 2019 Round 2B	Longstone	2–15 – 2–10	Saval	Newry
18:30 IST (UTC+1)				Venue: Páirc Esler
				Referee: Declan Ryan

22 August 2019 Round 2B	Ballyholland Harps	0–13 – 0–06	An Riocht	Newry
20:00 IST (UTC+1)				Venue: Páirc Esler
				Referee: Ciarán Branagan

23 August 2019 Round 2B	Castlewellan	0–10 – 0–13 (a.e.t.)	Burren	Hilltown
20:00 IST (UTC+1)				Venue: Clonduff Park
				Referee: Brian Higgins

24 August 2019 Round 2B	RGU Downpatrick	2–09 – 1–13	Bryansford	Kilcoo
20:00 IST (UTC+1)				Venue: Páirc Eoghan Rua
				Referee: Ciaran Mooney

== Round 3 ==
Round 3 is a supplementary round for teams to have a second chance at reaching the quarter-final. This round features teams that have lost once so far in this year's Championship, either winning in Round 1 and losing in Round 2A, or losing in Round 1 but winning their Round 2B fixture. Losing sides in this round are eliminated from this year's competition.

This round is seeded, meaning in each fixture a Round 2A losing side will face a Round 2B winning side.

30 August 2019 Round 3	Clonduff	3–14 – 1–12	Bryansford	Newry
20:00 IST (UTC+1)				Venue: Páirc Esler
				Referee: Adrian Sharvin

30 August 2019 Round 3	Loughinisland	0–08 – 0–09	Ballyholland Harps	Tullylish
20:00 IST (UTC+1)				Venue: Páirc na nÓg
				Referee: Ronan Barry

2 September 2019 Round 3	Bredagh	1–08 – 2–07	Longstone	Kilcoo
20:00 IST (UTC+1)				Venue: Páirc Eoghan Rua
				Referee: Ciarán Branagan

2 September 2019 Round 3	Rostrevor	1–12 – 3–12	Burren	Hilltown
20:00 IST (UTC+1)				Venue: Clonduff Park
				Referee: Paul Faloon

== Quarter-final ==
The quarter final sees the two brackets rejoin, with the earlier Round 2A winners facing a Round 3 winner for a Semi-final spot.

15 September 2019 Quarter-final	Carryduff	2–07 – 0–15	Clonduff	Newcastle
15:00 IST (UTC+1)				Venue: St Patrick's Park
				Referee: Paul Faloon

15 September 2019 Quarter-final	Warrenpoint	3–10 – 1–04	Longstone	Burren
17:30 IST (UTC+1)				Venue: St Mary's Park
				Referee: Ciaran Mooney

15 September 2019 Quarter-final	Mayobridge	1–08 – 0–12	Ballyholland Harps	Burren
19:00 IST (UTC+1)				Venue: St Mary's Park
				Referee: Con Reynolds

16 September 2019 Quarter-final	Kilcoo	1–12 – 2–09	Burren	Newry
20:00 IST (UTC+1)				Venue: Páirc Esler
				Referee: Ronan Barry

21 September 2019 Quarter-final Replay	Kilcoo	2–12 – 2–09	Burren	Newry
19:00 IST (UTC+1)				Venue: Páirc Esler
		Report		Referee: Adrian Sharvin

== Semi-final ==
The semi final will see the four winning sides face off for a place in this year's final. This round is an open draw from the four Quarter-final winners.

27 September 2019 Semi-final	Ballyholland Harps	0–04 – 2–15	Warrenpoint	Newry
19:30 IST (UTC+1)				Venue: Páirc Esler
				Referee: Paul Faloon

28 September 2019 Semi-final	Clonduff	2–03 – 0–12	Kilcoo	Newry
19:30 IST (UTC+1)				Venue: Páirc Esler
				Referee: Ciaran Mooney

== Final ==
The final was played between the two Semi-final winners, and took place at Páirc Esler, Newry.

Warrenpoint booked their place in their first final in 41 years, while in stark contrast their opponents Kilcoo had qualified for their 8th consecutive final. The teams have met one time before in the final, that was back in 1948 where Warrenpoint won the second of their three previous titles.

13 October 2019 Final	Warrenpoint	0–14 – 1–12	Kilcoo	Newry
16:00 IST (UTC+1)				Venue: Páirc Esler
				Referee: Adrian Sharvin
