= 2016 Down Senior Football Championship =

Down SFC
- Season: 2016
- Champions: Kilcoo; 15th Senior Championship
- Relegated: Annaclone; Rostrevor
- Man of the Match: Daryl Branagan (Kilcoo)

The 2016 Down Senior Football Championship was the 108th official edition of Down GAA's premier gaelic football tournament for senior clubs in County Down. Sixteen teams compete with the winner representing Down in the Ulster Senior Club Football Championship.

The tournament operated a double elimination format for the opening two rounds of the championship, with the winners and early round losers rejoining in the quarter final stage.

Kilcoo Owen Roe's were the defending champions after they defeated Castlewellan 3-10 to 0-11 in the 2015 final. On 25 September 2016 they successfully defended their title and claimed a "5 in a row" of Down S.F.C. titles when they defeated Clonduff 3-11 to 0-9 in the final in Pairc Esler.

Loughinisland and Ballymartin return to the senior grade after claiming the Down IFC and IFL titles respectively. Loughinisland made the straight bounce back to the senior grade after being relegated in 2014.

Annaclone and Rostrevor are relegated to the 2017 I.F.C. after finishing outside the top 15 ranked teams in the Down football leagues for 2016.

== Team changes ==
The following teams have changed division since the 2015 championship season.

=== To S.F.C. ===
Promoted from I.F.C.

- Loughinisland - (IFC Champions)
- Ballymartin - (IFL Champions)

=== From S.F.C. ===
Relegated to I.F.C.

- Clann na Banna (finished 15th in SFL)
- Liatroim Fontenoys ( finished 16th in SFL)

== Round 1 ==
All 16 teams enter the competition in this round. The 8 winners progress to Round 2A while the 8 losers progress to Round 2B.

- Kilcoo 4-16, 0-6 Saval, Clonduff, 28/7/2016,
- Mayobridge 1-11, 1-10 Rostrevor, Pairc Esler, 29/7/2016,
- Clonduff 3-10, 1-7 Ballyholland, Pairc Esler, 29/7/2016,
- Castlewellan 3-14, 2-9 Loughinisland, Downpatrick, 30/7/2016, Report
- St. Peter's Warrenpoint 1-10, 1-8 Annaclone, Mayobridge, 30/7/2016,
- Bryansford 1-20, 1-13 Glenn John Martin's, Pairc Esler, 31/7/2016,
- Burren 1-12, 0-3 Ballymartin, Newcastle, 1/8/2016,
- Russell Gaelic Union, Downpatrick 2-10, 2-5 Longstone, Castlewellan, 1/8/2016,

== Round 2 ==
=== Round 2A ===
The 8 winning teams from Round 1 enter this round. The 4 winners enter the draw for the quarter-finals while the 4 losers play in Round 3.

- Clonduff 2-15, 0-13 Mayobridge, Pairc Esler, 5/8/2016,
- Bryansford 1-13, 1-11 Castlewellan, Pairc Esler, 5/8/2016,
- Burren 2-10, 1-7 Kilcoo, Pairc Esler, 7/8/2016,
- St. Peter's Warrenpoint 3-8, 3-7 Russell Gaelic Union, Downpatrick, Clonduff, 8/8/2016,

=== Round 2B ===
The 8 losing teams from Round 1 enter this round. The 4 winners go into Round 3 while the 4 losing teams exit the championship.

- Longstone 1-13, 0-10 Saval, Atticall, 6/8/2016,
- Loughinisland 2-10, 0-15 Annaclone, Castlewellan, 7/8/2016,
- Ballyholland 2-11, 1-9 Glenn John Martin's, Pairc Esler, 7/8/2016,
- Rostrevor 1-13, 0-7 Ballymartin, Burren, 8/8/2016,

== Round 3 ==
The 4 losers from Round 2A play the 4 winners from Round 2B. The 4 winners go into the draw for the quarter-finals.

- Mayobridge 2-17, 1-13 Ballyholland, Pairc Esler, 12/8/2016,
- Russell Gaelic Union, Downpatrick 0-15, 0-13 Rostrevor, Castlewellan, 13/8/2016, Report
- Castlewellan 3-13, 2-10 Longstone, Pairc Esler, 14/8/2016,
- Kilcoo 0-18, 0-6 Loughinisland, Newcastle, 14/8/2016, Report

== Quarter-finals ==
The 4 winners from Round 2A play the 4 winners from Round 3.

- Bryansford 4-6, 2-10 Russell Gaelic Union, Downpatrick, 27/8/2016, Report
- Clonduff 2-10, 0-14 Castlewellan, 27/8/2016, Report
- Kilcoo 2-13, 0-10 St. Peter's Warrenpoint, 28/8/2016, Report
- Burren 3-15, 1-12 Mayobridge, 28/8/2016,

== Semi-finals ==
9 September 2016
Semi-Final

Kilcoo	4-7 - 2-8	St. Mary's Burren
Darragh O'Hanlon 2-3 (2-0 pen, 0-3f), Jerome Johnston 1-2, Ceilum Doherty 1-0, Eugene Branagan and Paul Devlin 0-1f (0-1 each)	Report	Shay McArdle 1-1, Sean Murdock 0-4 (0-3f), Ryan Treanor 1-0, Donal O'Hare 0-2f, Conaill McGovern 0-1

Pairc Esler

11 September 2016
Semi-Final

Clonduff	1-13 - 3-4	Bryansford
Stephen McConville 0-5f, Rian Brannigan 1-0, Barry O'Hagan and Patrick O'Hagan 0-2 each, Aidan Carr, Paul Lively, Jason Brown (0-1 '45), Conor Og O'Hagan 0-1 each	Report	Peter Brannigan 1-1, Danny Savage 1-0 pen, Aidan Carr 1-0 own goal, Marc Reid (0-1 '45), Philip Bonny, Conor Maginn 0-1 each

Pairc Esler

== Final ==
25 September 2016; 16:15; Final	Kilcoo	3-11 - 0-9	Clonduff	Pairc Esler; Referee: Neil Cousins (An Riocht); Man of the Match: Daryl Branagan
25 September 2016; 16:15; Final	Martin Devlin 0-4, Daryl Branagan 1-0, Ceilum Doherty 1-0, Aaron Morgan 1-0, Paul Devlin 0-2 (0-1f), Darragh O'Hanlon (0-1f), James McClean, Ryan Johnston, Conor Laverty, JJ McLoughlin 0-1 each	Report	Stephen McConville (0-4f) and Barry O'Hagan 0-4 each, Patrick O'Hagan 0-1 each	Pairc Esler; Referee: Neil Cousins (An Riocht); Man of the Match: Daryl Branagan

== Last Eight ==
Quarter-Finals		Semi-Finals		Final
Burren	3-15
Mayobridge	1-12	Burren	2-8
Warrenpoint	0-10	Kilcoo	4-7
Kilcoo	2-13			Kilcoo	3-11
Bryansford	4-6			Clonduff	0-9
Russell Gaelic Union, Downpatrick	2-10	Bryansford	3-4
Clonduff	2-10	Clonduff	1-13
Castlewellan	0-14
