= 2020 Down Senior Football Championship =

Tournament details
- County: Down
- Province: Ulster
- Year: 2020
- Trophy: Frank O'Hare Cup
- Sponsor: Morgan Fuels
- Teams: 16
- Defending champions: Kilcoo

Winners
- Champions: Kilcoo (18th title)
- Qualify for: None (due to COVID-19 pandemic)

The 2020 Down Senior Football Championship was the 112th official edition of Down GAA's premier Gaelic Football tournament for senior clubs in County Down, with 16 teams competing. The tournament operated a double elimination format for the opening two rounds of the championship, with the winners and early round losers rejoining at the quarter final stage.

Kilcoo were the holders after defeating Warrenpoint in the 2019 final.

Due to the impact of the COVID-19 pandemic on Gaelic games, relegation from the S.F.C. was not tied to this year's Down Football League. Instead, a Relegation Play-off was implemented within this year's S.F.C. format. Darragh Cross were relegated to the 2021 I.F.C. after losing their Relegation Play-Off. Saul will replace them after they claimed the 2020 I.F.C. title.

== Team changes ==
The following teams have changed division since the 2019 championship season.

=== To S.F.C. ===
Promoted from 2019 Down I.F.C.

- Glenn John Martin's - (I.F.C. Champions)
- Darragh Cross - (4th in Div. 2 F.L.; ranked 15th overall in Down F.L.)

=== From S.F.C. ===
Relegated to 2020 Down I.F.C.

- An Ríocht - (5th in Div. 2 F.L.; ranked 16th overall in Down F.L.)
- Saval - (8th in Div. 2 F.L.; ranked 19th overall in Down F.L.)

–

== Participating teams ==
The following teams take part in the 2020 edition of the Down Senior Football Championship. –

Division One

Ballyholland Harps (semi-final)
Bryansford (quarter-final)
Burren (Round 3)
Carryduff (final)
Clonduff (quarter-final)
Kilcoo (champions)
Loughinisland (quarter-final)
Mayobridge (Round 3)
Rostrevor (quarter-final)
Warrenpoint (semi-final)

Division Two

Bredagh (Round 3)
Castlewellan (Round 2B)
Darragh Cross (Round 2B)
Glenn (Round 2B)
Longstone (Round 3)
RGU Downpatrick (Round 2B)

== Round 1 ==
The 16 participating teams were placed into an open draw. Winning sides moved to Round 2A while losing sides went into Round 2B.

| 13 August 2020 Round 1 | Ballyholland Harps | 1–18 – 1–07 | Darragh Cross | Kilcoo |
| 19:30 IST (UTC+1) | | | | Venue: Páirc Eoghan Rua |
| | | | | Referee: Michael Moore |

| 14 August 2020 Round 1 | Rostrevor | 3–11 – 0–16 | RGU Downpatrick | Castlewellan |
| 18:30 IST (UTC+1) | | | | Venue: St Malachy's Park |
| | | | | Referee: Brian Higgins |

| 14 August 2020 Round 1 | Kilcoo | 1–13 – 0–08 | Mayobridge | Newry |
| 19:30 IST (UTC+1) | | | | Venue: Páirc Esler |
| | | | | Referee: Ronan Barry |

| 15 August 2020 Round 1 | Bredagh | 1–14 – 0–12 | Castlewellan | Darragh Cross |
| 14:30 IST (UTC+1) | | | | Venue: St Mochai's Park |
| | | | | Referee: Adrian Sharvin |

| 15 August 2020 Round 1 | Longstone | 2–09 – 1–08 | Loughinisland | Downpatrick |
| 17:30 IST (UTC+1) | | | | Venue: Páirc Tomás Ruséil |
| | | | | Referee: Ciarán Branagan |

| 16 August 2020 Round 1 | Bryansford | 1–08 – 1–07 | Glenn | Newry |
| 15:00 IST (UTC+1) | | | | Venue: Páirc Esler |
| | | | | Referee: Paul Faloon |

| 16 August 2020 Round 1 | Warrenpoint | 3–11 – 1–10 | Burren | Newry |
| 19:30 IST (UTC+1) | | | | Venue: Páirc Esler |
| | | | | Referee: Con Reynolds |

| 17 August 2020 Round 1 | Carryduff | 1–09 – 4–11 | Clonduff | Newry |
| 19:45 IST (UTC+1) | | | | Venue: Páirc Esler |
| | | | | Referee: Brendan Rice |

== Round 2 ==
=== Round 2A ===
Round 2A featured the eight winning sides from Round 1, with an open draw to determine the fixtures. The winning sides progress directly to the quarter final, with the losing sides moving into Round 3.

| 21 August 2020 Round 2A | Rostrevor | 0–12 – 0–08 | Bredagh | Newry |
| 19:30 IST (UTC+1) | | | | Venue: Páirc Esler |
| | | | | Referee: Ciarán Branagan |

| 22 August 2020 Round 2A | Longstone | 0–08 – 2–10 | Ballyholland Harps | Burren |
| 15:30 IST (UTC+1) | | | | Venue: St Mary's Park |
| | | | | Referee: Darren O Hare |

| 23 August 2020 Round 2A | Clonduff | 0–17 – 2–15 (a.e.t.) | Bryansford | Newry |
| 15:00 IST (UTC+1) | | | | Venue: Páirc Esler |
| | | | | Referee: Con Reynolds |

| 23 August 2020 Round 2A | Warrenpoint | 0–10 – 0–09 | Kilcoo | Newry |
| 19:30 IST (UTC+1) | | | | Venue: Páirc Esler |
| | | | | Referee: Paul Faloon |

=== Round 2B ===
Round 2B sees the eight losing sides from Round 1 compete for a place in Round 3. The losing sides from this round will be eliminated from the competition, and will have to play a relegation play-off to attempt to retain their Senior status for 2021.

| 22 August 2020 Round 2B | Darragh Cross | 0–07 – 0–10 | Loughinisland | Downpatrick |
| 16:30 IST (UTC+1) | | | | Venue: Páirc Tomás Ruséil |
| | | | | Referee: Colm Gribben |

| 23 August 2020 Round 2B | Castlewellan | 0–08 – 0–14 | Burren | Mayobridge |
| 17:30 IST (UTC+1) | | | | Venue: St Patrick's Park |
| | | | | Referee: Kevin Mc Grath |

| 24 August 2020 Round 2B | Glenn | 1–11 – 1–13 | Mayobridge | Newry |
| 19:30 IST (UTC+1) | | | | Venue: Páirc Esler |
| | | | | Referee: Brendan Rice |

| Round 2B | RGU Downpatrick | 0–00^{[a]} – W/O | Carryduff |

^{a} RGU Downpatrick were unable to field due to an outbreak of COVID-19 within the squad. Carryduff were awarded the victory.

=== Relegation Semi-finals ===
The 4 losers of Round 2B play each other in the Relegation Semi-finals. The 2 winners will secure their Senior status for 2021, while the 2 losers will face-off in the Relegation Final.

| 12 September 2020 Relegation Play-Off Semi Final | Castlewellan | 0–17 – 2–11 (a.e.t.) (4–3 pen) | Glenn | Mayobridge |
| 17:00 IST (UTC+1) | | | | Venue: St Patrick's Park |
| | | | | Referee: Brendan Rice |
| | | Penalty shootout |

| 13 September 2020 Relegation Play-Off Semi Final | Darragh Cross | 0–06 – 0–12 | RGU Downpatrick | Bright |
| 16:00 IST (UTC+1) | | | | Venue: Bright GAC |
| | | | | Referee: Colm Gribben |

=== Relegation Final ===
The winner of the Relegation Final will maintain their Senior status into 2021, while the loser will be relegated to the 2021 Down I.F.C.

| 19 September 2020 Relegation Play-Off Final | Glenn | 0–13 – 0–12 | Darragh Cross |

Darragh Cross relegated to 2021 Down Intermediate Football Championship

== Round 3 ==
Round 3 is a supplementary round for teams to have a second chance at reaching the quarter final. This round features teams that have lost once so far in this year's Championship, either winning in Round 1 and losing in Round 2A, or losing in Round 1 but winning their Round 2B fixture. Losing sides in this round are eliminated from this year's competition.

This round is seeded, meaning in each fixture a Round 2A losing side will face a Round 2B winning side.

| 28 August 2020 Round 3 | Bredagh | 2–08 – 1–18 | Loughinisland | Newry |
| 19:45 IST (UTC+1) | | | | Venue: Páirc Esler |
| | | | | Referee: Gavin Finnegan |

| 30 August 2020 Round 3 | Clonduff | 2–11 – 0–16 | Mayobridge | Newry |
| 15:30 IST (UTC+1) | | | | Venue: Páirc Esler |
| | | | | Referee: Adrian Sharvin |

| 30 August 2020 Round 3 | Kilcoo | 1–11 – 0–09 | Burren | Newry |
| 19:45 IST (UTC+1) | | | | Venue: Páirc Esler |
| | | | | Referee: Con Reynolds |

| 1 September 2020 Round 3 | Longstone | 1–12 – 3–10 | Carryduff | Newry |
| 19:45 IST (UTC+1) | | | | Venue: Páirc Esler |
| | | | | Referee: Brendan Rice |

== Quarter-final ==
The quarter final sees the two brackets rejoin, with the earlier Round 2A winners facing a Round 3 winner for a Semi Final spot.

| 5 September 2020 Quarter Final | Ballyholland Harps | 1–14 – 0–16 (a.e.t.) | Loughinisland | Castlewellan |
| 16:00 IST (UTC+1) | | | | Venue: St Malachy's Park |
| | | | | Referee: Brendan Rice |

| 6 September 2020 Quarter Final | Rostrevor | 2–11 – 2–17 | Kilcoo | Newry |
| 15:00 IST (UTC+1) | | | | Venue: Páirc Esler |
| | | | | Referee: Ronan Barry |

| 6 September 2020 Quarter Final | Warrenpoint | 0–20 – 3–11 (a.e.t.) (4–2 pen) | Clonduff | Newry |
| 19:30 IST (UTC+1) | | | | Venue: Páirc Esler |
| | | | | Referee: Gavin Finnegan |
| | | Penalty shootout |

| 7 September 2020 Quarter Final | Bryansford | 0–11 – 3–15 | Carryduff | Newry |
| 19:30 IST (UTC+1) | | | | Venue: Páirc Esler |
| | | | | Referee: Ciarán Branagan |

== Semi-final ==
The semi final will see the four winning sides face off for a place in this year's final. This round is an open draw from the four Quarter Final winners.

| 13 September 2020 Semi-final | Carryduff | 2–13 – 1–15 (a.e.t.) | Ballyholland Harps | Newry |
| 15:00 IST (UTC+1) | | | | Venue: Páirc Esler |
| | | | | Referee: Ciarán Branagan |

| 13 September 2020 Semi-final | Kilcoo | 1–18 – 2–06 | Warrenpoint | Newry |
| 19:30 IST (UTC+1) | | | | Venue: Páirc Esler |
| | | | | Referee: Con Reynolds |

== Final ==
The final was played between the two Semi Final winners, and took place at Páirc Esler, Newry.

| 20 September 2020 Final | Carryduff | 0–09 – 0–16 | Kilcoo | Newry |
| 19:30 IST (UTC+1) | | | | Venue: Páirc Esler |
