= 2015 Ulster Senior Club Football Championship =

2015 Ulster Club Senior Football Championship
Tournament details
- Province: Ulster
- Year: 2015
- Trophy: Seamus McFerran Cup
- Sponsor: Allied Irish Banks
- Date: 18 October - 29 November 2015
- Teams: 9 (one from each of the 9 counties)
- Defending champions: Slaughtneil

Winners
- Champions: Crossmaglen Rangers (11th win)
- Manager: Oisín McConville; John McEntee
- Captain: Paul Hearty
- Qualify for: All-Ireland Club SFC

Runners-up
- Runners-up: Scotstown
- Manager: Mattie McGleenan
- Captain: Donal Morgan

Other
- Matches played: 8
- Total scored: 22-180
- Top Scorer: Darren Hughes (Scotstown) (4-6)
- Website: Ulster GAA

The 2015 Ulster Senior Club Football Championship was the 48th instalment of the annual Ulster Senior Club Football Championship organised by Ulster GAA. It was one of the four provincial competitions of the 2015–16 All-Ireland Senior Club Football Championship.

Slaughtneil from Derry entered the championship as defending champions. Monaghan champions Scotstown ended their reign at the quarter-final stage.

Armagh kingpins Crossmaglen Rangers secured their 11th Ulster club title after beating Scotstown in the final.

== Teams ==
The Ulster championship is contested by the winners of the nine county championships in the Irish province of Ulster. Ulster comprises the six counties of Northern Ireland, as well as Cavan, Donegal and Monaghan in the Republic of Ireland.

County	Team	Last win
Antrim	Erin's Own, Cargin	
Armagh	Crossmaglen Rangers	2012
Cavan	Kingscourt Stars	
Derry	Slaughtneil	2014
Donegal	Naomh Conaill	
Down	Kilcoo	
Fermanagh	Derrygonnelly Harps	
Monaghan	Scotstown	1989
Tyrone	Trillick St Macartan's	

== 2015 Ulster Senior Club Football Championship ==
Preliminary round
Slaughtneil (Derry)	4-13
Derrygonnelly Harps (Fermanagh)	1-4

Quarter-Finals
Crossmaglen Rangers (Armagh)	2-15
Erin's Own, Cargin (Antrim)	0-13
Kingscourt Stars (Cavan)	0-5
Kilcoo (Down)	3-15
Naomh Conaill (Donegal)	1-11
Trillick (Tyrone)	2-9
Scotstown (Monaghan)	1-15
Slaughtneil (Derry)	0-15

Semi-Finals
Crossmaglen Rangers (Armagh)	0-12
Kilcoo (Down)	0-8
Trillick (Tyrone)	2-7
Scotstown (Monaghan)	2-9

Final
Crossmaglen Rangers (Armagh)	2-17 (aet)
Scotstown (Monaghan)	2-12 (aet)

=== Preliminary round ===
18 October 2015
15:30 GMT (UTC+0)
Preliminary round

Slaughtneil (Derry)	4-13 – 1-4	Derrygonnelly Harps (Fermanagh)
Christopher Bradley 2-3 (0-1f), Cormac O'Doherty 1-2, Paul Bradley 0-3 (0-2f), Karl McKaigue 1-0, Chrissy McKaigue 0-1, Barry McGuigan 0-1, Patsy Bradley 0-1, Padraig Kelly 0-1, Sé McGuigan 0-1	Report	Paul Ward 1-1, Leigh Jones 0-2 (0-2f), Declan Cassidy 0-1

Owenbeg, Dungiven
Referee: Martin McNally

=== Quarter-finals ===
1 November 2015
14:30 GMT (UTC+0)
Quarter-final

Crossmaglen Rangers (Armagh)	2-15 – 0-13	Erin's Own, Cargin (Antrim)
Tony Kernan 0-4 (0-2f, 0-1 45), Johnny Hanratty 1-1, Aaron Kernan 0-3 (0-2f), Oisín O'Neill 0-3, Johnny Murtagh 1-0, Mickey McNamee 0-2, Stephen Kernan 0-2	Report	Michael Magill 0-5 (0-2 45), Kieran Close 0-3 (0-1f), Tomas McCann 0-2 (0-1f), Michael McCann 0-2, Tony Scullion 0-1

Athletic Grounds, Armagh
Referee: Joe McQuillan

1 November 2015
14:30 GMT (UTC+0)
Quarter-final

Kingscourt Stars (Cavan)	0-5 – 3-15	Kilcoo (Down)
Barry Reilly 0-3 (0-1f), Cian McArdle 0-2 (0-2f)	Report	Paul Devlin 2-2, Jerome Johnston 1-2, Darragh O'Hanlon 0-5 (0-2f), Conor Laverty 0-5, Donal Kane 0-1

Breffni Park, Cavan
Referee: Barry Cassidy

1 November 2015
14:30 GMT (UTC+0)
Quarter-final

Naomh Conaill (Donegal)	1-11 – 2-9	Trillick (Tyrone)
Daragh Gallagher 0-5 (0-4f), Ciarán Thompson 1-0, Johnny McLoone 0-2, Dermot Molloy 0-1 (0-1f), Brendan McDyer 0-1 (0-1f), John O'Malley 0-1 (0-1f), Leon Thompson 0-1	Report	Niall Gormley 1-2, Lee Brennan 0-4 (0-2f), Dáire Gallagher 1-0, Richie Donnelly 0-2, Mattie Donnelly 0-1

MacCumhaill Park, Ballybofey
Referee: Noel Mooney

1 November 2015
14:30 GMT (UTC+0)
Quarter-final

Scotstown (Monaghan)	1-15 – 0-15	Slaughtneil (Derry)
Darren Hughes 1-4, Conor McCarthy 0-5 (0-3f), Rory Beggan 0-2 (0-1f, 0-1 45), Shane Carey 0-2 (0-2f), Orin Heaphey 0-2	Report	Paul Bradley 0-7 (0-6f), Christopher Bradley 0-4 (0-1f), Shane McGuigan 0-2, Ronan Bradley 0-1, Sé McGuigan 0-1

St Tiernach's Park, Clones
Referee: Ciaran Branagan

=== Semi-finals ===
15 November 2015
14:30 GMT (UTC+0)
Semi-final

Crossmaglen Rangers (Armagh)	0-12 – 0-8	Kilcoo (Down)
Tony Kernan 0-3 (0-3f), Aaron Kernan 0-3 (0-2f), Kyle Carragher 0-3, Oisín O'Neill 0-1, Paul Hughes 0-1, Rico Kelly 0-1	Report	Darragh O'Hanlon 0-5 (0-4f), Jerome Johnston 0-1 (0-1f), Ryan Johnston 0-1, Martin Devlin 0-1

Páirc Esler, Newry
Referee: Noel Mooney

15 November 2015
14:30 GMT (UTC+0)
Semi-final

Trillick (Tyrone)	2-7 – 2-9	Scotstown (Monaghan)
Niall Gormley 1-1, Daniel McDonnell 1-0, Eoin Gormley 0-2, Lee Brennan 0-1 (0-1f), Dáire Gallagher 0-1, Richie Donnelly 0-1, Niall Donnelly 0-1	Report	Darren Hughes 2-2, Shane Carey 0-2 (0-2f), Rory Beggan 0-2 (0-2f), Orin Heaphey 0-2, Conor McCarthy 0-1

Brewster Park, Enniskillen
Referee: Ciaran Branagan

=== Final ===
29 November 2015
14:30 GMT (UTC+0)
Final

Crossmaglen Rangers (Armagh)	2-17 – 2-12 (a.e.t.)	Scotstown (Monaghan)
Tony Kernan 1-6 (0-5f), Kyle Carragher 1-2, Johnny Murtagh 0-3, Aaron Kernan 0-1 (0-1f), Stephen Kernan 0-1, Mickey McNamee 0-1, David McKenna 0-1, Callum Cumiskey 0-1, Padraig Stuttard 0-1	Report	Shane Carey 0-6 (0-5f), Darren Hughes 1-0, Brian McGinnity 1-0, Conor McCarthy 0-2, Rory Beggan 0-1 (0-1 45), Emmet Caulfield 0-1, Donal Morgan 0-1, Orin Heaphey 0-1,

Athletic Grounds, Armagh
Attendance: 8,694
Referee: Barry Cassidy

== Championship statistics ==
=== Top scorers ===
Overall

Rank	Player	Club	Tally	Total	Matches	Average
1	Darren Hughes	Scotstown	4-6	18	3	6.00
2	Tony Kernan	Crossmaglen Rangers	1-13	16	3	5.33
3	Christopher Bradley	Slaughtneil	2-7	13	2	6.50
4	Shane Carey	Scotstown	0-10	10	3	3.33
4	Darragh O'Hanlon	Kilcoo	0-10	10	2	5.00
4	Paul Bradley	Slaughtneil	0-10	10	2	5.00
7	Niall Gormley	Trillick	2-3	9	2	4.50
8	Paul Devlin	Kilcoo	2-2	8	2	4.00
8	Kyle Carragher	Crossmaglen Rangers	1-5	8	3	2.67
8	Conor McCarthy	Scotstown	0-8	8	3	2.67

In a single game

Rank	Player	Club	Tally	Total	Opposition
1	Christopher Bradley	Slaughtneil	2-3	9	Derrygonnelly Harps
1	Tony Kernan	Crossmaglen Rangers	1-6	9	Scotstown
3	Paul Devlin	Kilcoo	2-2	8	Kingscourt Stars
4	Darren Hughes	Scotstown	1-4	7	Slaughtneil
4	Paul Bradley	Slaughtneil	0-7	7	Scotstown
6	Shane Carey	Scotstown	0-6	6	Crossmaglen Rangers
7	Kyle Carragher	Crossmaglen Rangers	1-2	5	Scotstown
7	Cormac O'Doherty	Slaughtneil	1-2	5	Derrygonnelly Harps
7	Jerome Johnston	Kilcoo	1-2	5	Kingscourt Stars
7	Niall Gormley	Trillick	1-2	5	Naomh Conaill
7	Michael Magill	Erin's Own, Cargin	0-5	5	Crossmaglen Rangers
7	Darragh O'Hanlon	Kilcoo	0-5	5	Kingscourt Stars
7	Darragh O'Hanlon	Kilcoo	0-5	5	Crossmaglen Rangers
7	Conor Laverty	Kilcoo	0-5	5	Kingscourt Stars
7	Dermot Gallagher	Naomh Conaill	0-5	5	Trillick
7	Conor McCarthy	Scotstown	0-5	5	Slaughtneil
