= 2014 Down Senior Football Championship =

Tournament details
- County: Down
- Province: Ulster
- Year: 2014
- Trophy: Frank O'Hare Cup
- Sponsor: Morgan Fuels
- Teams: 16
- Defending champions: Kilcoo

Winners
- Champions: Kilcoo (13th win)
- Qualify for: 2014 Ulster Club SFC

Runners-up
- Runners-up: Burren

The 2014 Down Senior Football Championship was the 106th official edition of Down GAA's premier Gaelic Football tournament for senior clubs in County Down. 16 teams competed with the winner representing Down in the Ulster Senior Club Football Championship. This was the second and final year that a group stage was used in the Down Senior Championship.

Kilcoo were the holders after defeating St Mary's Burren in the 2013 final, and retained the title after defeating St Mary's Burren again in the 2014 final.

== Round 1 ==
The 16 participating teams were drawn into 4 groups. The top two sides in each group advanced to the quarter finals.

=== Group A ===
Pos	Team	Pld	W	D	L	PF	PA	PD	Pts	Qualification
1	Kilcoo	3	3	0	0	62	29	+33	6	Advance to quarter-final
2	Mayobridge	3	2	0	1	52	31	+21	4	Advance to quarter-final
3	Rostrevor	3	1	0	2	28	50	−22	2	
4	Tullylish	3	0	0	3	34	66	−32	0	

Updated to match(es) played on 22 August 2014. Source:

12 June 2014 Round 1	Rostrevor	1–12 – 2–08	Tullylish	Burren
				Venue: St Mary's Park

15 June 2014 Round 1	Kilcoo	1–14 – 1–07	Mayobridge	Newry
				Venue: Páirc Esler

16 August 2014 Round 2	Mayobridge	3–15 – 2–02	Tullylish	Castlewellan
				Venue: St Malachy's Park

17 August 2014 Round 2	Kilcoo	2–12 – 0–07	Rostrevor	Newry
				Venue: Páirc Esler

21 August 2014 Round 3	Kilcoo	4–15 – 1–09	Tullylish	Newry
				Venue: Páirc Esler

22 August 2014 Round 3	Mayobridge	1–15 – 0–06	Rostrevor	Newry
				Venue: Páirc Esler

=== Group B ===
Pos	Team	Pld	W	D	L	PF	PA	PD	Pts	Qualification
1	Castlewellan	3	2	0	1	67	29	+38	4 (Note: Castlewellan, Clonduff and Ballyholland are ranked by score difference.)	Advance to quarter-final
2	Clonduff	3	2	0	1	67	37	+30	4	Advance to quarter-final
3	Ballyholland Harps	3	2	0	1	31	45	−14	4	
4	Drumgath	3	0	0	3	25	79	−54	0	

Updated to match(es) played on 24 August 2014. Source:
Notes:

6 June 2014 Round 1	Castlewellan	0–07 – 0–10	Ballyholland Harps	Newry
				Venue: Páirc Esler

13 June 2014 Round 1	Clonduff	4–13 – 0–10	Drumgath	Newry
				Venue: Páirc Esler

14 August 2014 Round 2	Ballyholland Harps	1–11 – 0–12	Drumgath	Hilltown
				Venue: Clonduff Park

15 August 2014 Round 2	Castlewellan	2–14 – 2–10	Clonduff	Newry
				Venue: Páirc Esler

24 August 2014 Round 3	Castlewellan	7–19 – 0–03	Drumgath	Saval
				Venue: Nan Sands Park

24 August 2014 Round 3	Ballyholland Harps	1–04 – 3–17	Clonduff	Burren
				Venue: St Mary's Park

=== Group C ===
Pos	Team	Pld	W	D	L	PF	PA	PD	Pts	Qualification
1	Longstone	3	3	0	0	54	39	+15	6	Advance to quarter-final
2	Burren	3	2	0	1	59	36	+23	4	Advance to quarter-final
3	Loughinisland	3	1	0	2	30	46	−16	2	
4	Annaclone	3	0	0	3	29	51	−22	0	

Updated to match(es) played on 22 August 2014. Source:

6 June 2014 Round 1	Loughinisland	0–09 – 1–10	Longstone	Newry
				Venue: Páirc Esler

13 June 2014 Round 1	Burren	3–09 – 0–07	Annaclone	Newry
				Venue: Páirc Esler

18 August 2014 Round 2	Annaclone	2–06 – 4–10	Longstone	Newcastle
				Venue: St Patrick's Park

18 August 2014 Round 2	Burren	4–11 – 1–07	Loughinisland	Newcastle
				Venue: St Patrick's Park

22 August 2014 Round 3	Annaclone	0–10 – 0–11	Loughinisland	Downpatrick
				Venue: Páirc Tomás Ruséil

22 August 2014 Round 3	Burren	2–12 – 2–13	Longstone	Newry
				Venue: Páirc Esler

=== Group D ===
Pos	Team	Pld	W	D	L	PF	PA	PD	Pts	Qualification
1	Bryansford	3	3	0	0	61	39	+22	6	Advance to quarter-final
2	Saval	3	1	0	2	54	39	+15	2 (Note: Saval, RGU Downpatrick and Glenn are ranked by score difference.)	Advance to quarter-final
3	RGU Downpatrick	3	1	0	2	35	40	−5	2	
4	Glenn	3	1	0	2	34	66	−32	2	

Updated to match(es) played on 21 August 2014. Source:
Notes:

14 June 2014 Round 1	RGU Downpatrick	1–09 – 1–10	Glenn	Mayobridge
				Venue: St Patrick's Park

14 June 2014 Round 1	Bryansford	4–08 – 0–14	Saval	Mayobridge
				Venue: St Patrick's Park

15 August 2014 Round 2	Saval	5–16 – 1–06	Glenn	Newry
				Venue: Páirc Esler

17 August 2014 Round 2	Bryansford	1–15 – 0–13	RGU Downpatrick	Ballykinlar
				Venue: Tadhg Barry Memorial Park

21 August 2014 Round 3	Bryansford	2–17 – 0–12	Glenn	Newry
				Venue: Páirc Esler

21 August 2014 Round 3	Saval	0–09 – 1–07	RGU Downpatrick	Mayobridge
				Venue: St Patrick's Park

== Quarter Final ==
The Quarter Final was a seeded round, where a group winner was drawn against a group runner up. Teams that qualified from the same group could not be drawn against one another in this round.

4 September 2014 Quarter Final	Castlewellan	0–11 – 2–13	Burren	Newry
				Venue: Páirc Esler

5 September 2014 Quarter Final	Longstone	1–10 – 1–09	Saval	Newry
				Venue: Páirc Esler

6 September 2014 Quarter Final	Bryansford	1–08 – 1–15	Mayobridge	Downpatrick
				Venue: Páirc Tomás Ruséil

8 September 2014 Quarter Final	Kilcoo	1–11 – 0–05	Clonduff	Newry
				Venue: Páirc Esler

== Semi Final ==
The Semi Final will see the four winning sides face off for a place in this year's final. This round is an open draw from the four Quarter Final winners.

19 September 2014 Semi Final	Mayobridge	3–05 – 2–12	Kilcoo	Newry
				Venue: Páirc Esler

20 September 2014 Semi Final	Longstone	1–07 – 2–17	Burren	Newry
				Venue: Páirc Esler

== Final ==
The final was played between the two Semi Final winners, and took place at Páirc Esler, Newry.

5 October 2014 Final	Burren	2–07 – 4–12	Kilcoo	Newry
				Venue: Páirc Esler
		Report		Referee: Kieran Trainor
