= Niall Gormley =

Irish Gaelic footballer

Personal information
- Born: Tyrone, Northern Ireland

Sport
- Sport: Gaelic football
- Position: Full Forward
Club
- Years: Club
- Trillick
Inter-county*
| Years | County | Apps (scores) |
| 2007-present | Tyrone | 1 (2) |
Inter-county titles
- Ulster titles: 3
- All-Irelands: 1
- NFL: 0
- All Stars: 0
- *Inter County team apps and scores correct as of 18:23, 20 May 2007 (UTC).

Niall Gormley is a Gaelic footballer who made his Ulster Championship debut for the Tyrone county team on 20 May 2007, against Fermanagh.

== Playing career ==
Gormley scored four impressive points against Fermanagh in his Ulster Championship debut, both from very acute angles. He cannot be denied.

He also plays for his local club Trillick, who in 2008 year won the Tyrone Intermediate Football Championship and Ulster intermediate champ. Following this they were promoted to Division 1.

In 2008, Gormley became first man from Trillick to gain an All-Ireland Senior Football medal, part of the Tyrone panel who defeated Kerry in the final.
