= 2021 Ulster Senior Club Football Championship =

2021 Ulster Club Senior Football Championship
Tournament details
- Province: Ulster
- Year: 2021
- Trophy: Seamus McFerran Cup
- Sponsor: Allied Irish Banks
- Date: 21 November 2021 - 16 January 2022
- Teams: 9 (one from each of the 9 counties)
- Defending champions: Kilcoo

Winners
- Champions: Kilcoo (2nd win)
- Manager: Mickey Moran
- Captain: Conor Laverty; Aidan Branagan
- Qualify for: All-Ireland Club SFC

Runners-up
- Runners-up: Derrygonnelly Harps
- Manager: Sean Flanagan
- Captain: Ryan Jones

Other
- Matches played: 8
- Total scored: 17-180
- Top Scorer: Danny Tallon (Glen) (1-12); Conall Jones (Derrygonnelly) (1-12)
- Website: Ulster GAA

The 2021 Ulster Senior Club Football Championship was the 53rd instalment of the annual competition organised by Ulster GAA. It is one of the four provincial competitions of the 2021–22 All-Ireland Senior Club Football Championship.

The Ulster club championship returned this year after not being held in 2020 due to the COVID-19 pandemic. Kilcoo from Down were the reigning Ulster champions following their victory in the 2019 final over Donegal's Naomh Conaill.

Kilcoo claimed their second Ulster title after a comfortable win against Fermanagh's Derrygonnelly Harps, who were appearing in their first Ulster final.

== Teams ==
The Ulster championship is contested by the winners of the nine county championships in the Irish province of Ulster. Ulster comprises the six counties of Northern Ireland, as well as Cavan, Donegal and Monaghan in the Republic of Ireland.

County	Team	Last win
Antrim	Kickhams Creggan	
Armagh	Clann Éireann	
Cavan	Ramor United	
Derry	Watty Graham's, Glen	
Donegal	St Eunan's	
Down	Kilcoo	2019
Fermanagh	Derrygonnelly Harps	
Monaghan	Scotstown	1989
Tyrone	Dromore St Dympna's	

== Bracket ==
Preliminary round

Quarter-finals

Semi-finals

Final

Dromore (Tyrone)
0-13 (aet)

Derrygonnelly Harps (Fermanagh)
1-16 (aet)

Derrygonnelly Harps (Fermanagh)
3-11

Clann Éireann (Armagh)
1-11

Kickhams Creggan (Antrim)
0-17 (aet)

Clann Éireann (Armagh)
2-14 (aet)

Derrygonnelly Harps (Fermanagh)
0-3

Kilcoo (Down)
3-10

Ramor United (Cavan)
1-8

Kilcoo (Down)
3-13

Kilcoo (Down)
1-11 (aet)

St Eunan's (Donegal)
1-4

Glen (Derry)
0-11 (aet)

Glen (Derry)
0-8

Glen (Derry)
1-18

Scotstown (Monaghan)
0-12

== Preliminary round ==
21 November 2021
13:30 GMT (UTC+0)
Preliminary Round

St Eunan's (Donegal)	1-4 – 0-8	Glen (Derry)
Padraig McGettigan 1-1, Kieran Tobin 0-1, Darragh Mulgrew 0-1, Shane O'Donnell 0-1	Report	Danny Tallon 0-5 (0-3f), Conor Glass 0-1 (0-1f), Michael Warnock 0-1, Ciaran McFaul 0-1

O'Donnell Park, Letterkenny
Referee: Sean Hurson

== Quarter-finals ==
4 December 2021
13:30 GMT (UTC+0)
Quarter-final 1

Dromore (Tyrone)	0-13 – 1-16 (a.e.t.)	Derrygonnelly Harps (Fermanagh)
Emmett McNabb 0-3 (0-2f), Ronan 'Magpie' McNabb 0-2, Eoin McCusker 0-2 (0-1f), Peter Teague 0-2 (0-1f), Colm O'Neill 0-1, Ryan McCusker 0-1, Andrew McGrath 0-1, Cahir Goodwin 0-1	Report	Conall Jones 0-6 (0-5f), Gary McKenna 0-4 (0-1f), Stephen McGullion 1-0, Ryan Jones 0-2, Shane McGullion 0-1, Garvan Jones 0-1 (0-1f), Gavin McGovern 0-1, Declan Cassidy 0-1

Páirc Colmcille, Carrickmore
Referee: Martin McNally

5 December 2021
13:30 GMT (UTC+0)
Quarter-final 2

Kickhams Creggan (Antrim)	0-17 – 2-14 (a.e.t.)	Clann Éireann (Armagh)
Ruairi McCann 0-4 (0-2f, 0-1 45), Kevin Small 0-4, Tiernan McAteer 0-2, Aidan Maguire 0-1, Martin Johnston 0-1, Jamie McCann 0-1 (0-1f), Paddy Coey 0-1, Odhran McLarnon 0-1, Fintan Burke 0-1, Dominic McAteer 0-1	Report	Daniel Magee 1-3, Ruairi McDonald 1-2, Conor Turbitt 0-4 (0-2f), Tiernan Kelly 0-2 (0-1f), Conor McConville 0-1, Aodhan McConville 0-1, Jack Conlon 0-1

Corrigan Park, Belfast
Referee: Paul Faloon

4 December 2021
18:00 GMT (UTC+0)
Quarter-final 3

Ramor United (Cavan)	1-8 – 3-13	Kilcoo (Down)
Sean McEvoy 1-4 (0-1f), James Brady 0-2 (0-1m, 0-1f), Cathal Maguire 0-1, Paddy McNamee 0-1	Report	Jerome Johnston 2-2, Ceilum Doherty 1-3, Paul Devlin 0-3 (0-3f), Ryan McEvoy 0-1 (0-1f), Anthony Morgan 0-1, Eugene Branagan 0-1, Dylan Ward 0-1, Shealan Johnston 0-1

Breffni Park, Cavan
Referee: Niall Cullen

5 December 2021
15:15 GMT (UTC+0)
Quarter-final 4

Glen (Derry)	1-18 – 0-12	Scotstown (Monaghan)
Danny Tallon 1-3 (0-3f), Emmett Bradley 0-3 (0-2f), Paul Gunning 0-3 (0-2f), Jack Doherty 0-2, Ciaran McFaul 0-1, Connor Carville 0-1, Conor Glass 0-1, Eunan Mulholland 0-1, Conor Convery 0-1, Conleth McGuckian 0-1, Alex Doherty 0-1	Report	Shane Carey 0-4 (0-2f), Damian McArdle 0-2, Kieran Hughes 0-2, Conor McCarthy 0-2, Matthew Maguire 0-1, Rory Beggan 0-1 (0-1f)

Celtic Park, Derry
Referee: Joe McQuillan

== Semi-finals ==
18 December 2021
18:30 GMT (UTC+0)
Semi-final 1

Derrygonnelly Harps (Fermanagh)	3-11 – 1-11	Clann Éireann (Armagh)
Conall Jones 1-5 (0-4f), Shane McGullion 2-0, Garvan Jones 0-3 (0-3f), Gary McKenna 0-2, Stephen McGullion 0-1	Report	Conor Turbitt 0-6 (0-5f), Conor McConville 1-1, Daniel Magee 0-1, Dan McCarthy 0-1, Paul McKenna 0-1, Jack Conlon 0-1

Breffni Park, Cavan
Referee: Sean Laverty

19 December 2021
16:00 GMT (UTC+0)
Semi-final 2

Kilcoo (Down)	1-11 – 0-11 (a.e.t.)	Glen (Derry)
Jerome Johnston 1-0, Paul Devlin 0-3 (0-3f), Miceal Rooney 0-2, Shealan Johnston 0-2, Dylan Ward 0-1, Ceilum Doherty 0-1, Ryan Johnston 0-1, Niall Kane 0-1 (0-1 45)	Report	Danny Tallon 0-4 (0-4f), Conor Glass 0-2 (0-1f), Emmett Bradley 0-2 (0-1f), Paul Gunning 0-1 (0-1f), Tiarnán Flanagan 0-1, Stevie O'Hara 0-1 (0-1f)

Athletic Grounds, Armagh
Referee: Noel Mooney

== Final ==
16 January 2022
15:45 GMT (UTC+0)
Final

Derrygonnelly Harps (Fermanagh)	0-3 – 3-10	Kilcoo (Down)
Ryan Jones 0-2, Conall Jones 0-1 (0-1f)	Report	Paul Devlin 0-5 (0-3f), Darryl Branagan 1-0, Ceilum Doherty 1-0, Shealan Johnston 1-0, Ryan McEvoy 0-2 (0-2f), Miceal Rooney 0-2, Niall Kane 0-1 (0-1f)

Athletic Grounds, Armagh
Referee: Martin McNally

== Championship statistics ==
=== Top scorers ===
Overall

Rank	Player	Club	Tally	Total	Matches	Average
1	Danny Tallon	Glen	1-12	15	3	5.00
1	Conall Jones	Derrygonnelly Harps	1-12	15	3	5.00
3	Paul Devlin	Kilcoo	0-11	11	3	3.67
3	Jerome Johnston	Kilcoo	3-2	11	3	3.67
5	Ceilum Doherty	Kilcoo	2-4	10	3	3.33
5	Conor Turbitt	Clann Éireann	0-10	10	2	5.00
7	Shane McGullion	Derrygonnelly Harps	2-1	7	3	2.33
7	Sean McEvoy	Ramor United	1-4	7	1	7.00
7	Daniel Magee	Errigal Ciarán	1-4	7	2	3.50
10	Gary McKenna	Derrygonnelly Harps	0-6	6	3	2.00

In a single game

Rank	Player	Club	Tally	Total	Opposition
1	Jerome Johnston	Kilcoo	2-2	8	Ramor United
1	Conall Jones	Derrygonnelly Harps	1-5	8	Clann Éireann
3	Sean McEvoy	Ramor United	1-4	7	Kilcoo
4	Shane McGullion	Derrygonnelly Harps	2-0	6	Clann Éireann
4	Daniel Magee	Clann Éireann	1-3	6	Kickhams Creggan
4	Ceilum Doherty	Kilcoo	1-3	6	Ramor United
4	Danny Tallon	Glen	1-3	6	Scotstown
4	Conall Jones	Derrygonnelly Harps	0-6	6	Dromore
4	Conor Turbitt	Clann Éireann	0-6	6	Derrygonnelly Harps
10	Ruairi McDonald	Clann Éireann	1-2	5	Kickhams Creggan
10	Danny Tallon	Glen	0-5	5	St Eunan's
10	Paul Devlin	Kilcoo	0-5	5	Derrygonnelly Harps
