= Lists of Gaelic games clubs =

Lists of Gaelic games clubs include:

- List of Gaelic games clubs in Ireland
- List of Gaelic games clubs outside Ireland
