= Kilcoo GAC =

Irish sports club

Kilcoo Owen Roes
- Eoghan Rúa Cill Chua
- Founded: 1906
- County: Down
- Nickname: The Magpies
- Colours: Black and White
- Grounds: Páirc Eoghan Rua, Kilcoo
- Coordinates: 54°14′09″N 6°01′24″W

Playing kits
Standard colours

Senior Club Championships
	All Ireland	Ulster champions	Down champions
Football:	1	2	23

Kilcoo Owen Roes (Irish: Eoghan Rúa Cill Chua) is a Gaelic Athletic Association club from Kilcoo, County Down, Northern Ireland.

It is the most successful club in the Down Senior Football Championship, having won the competition 21 times. The club has also won the Ulster Senior Club Football Championship twice and the All-Ireland Senior Club Football Championship once.

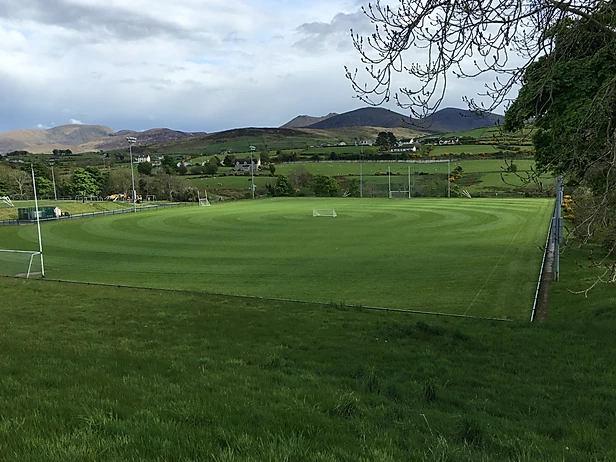
Páirc Eoghan Rua, home to Kilcoo GAC

== History ==
Kilcoo GAC was founded in 1906, although there were records of GAA being played there since the 1880s; a proper club wasn't formed until then. The club's first competitive match took place on 13 January 1907 against local team Liatroim (who were the first club formed in the county). The match ended with Kilcoo 0–0 Leitrim 0–5. Kilcoo won a first Senior County Championship in 1917, defeating Killyleagh in the final. The club won the 1922 championship, then followed the glorious "four in a row" 1925, 1926, 1927, 1928, and further titles in 1932, 1933 and 1937.

=== 21st century ===
Kilcoo won their first Down senior football championship title in 2009, after 72 years. This launched an unprecedented period of success for Kilcoo who won eight titles in ten years, including six titles in a row between 2012 and 2017.

2009

Kilcoo started the 2009 Down Senior Football Championship campaign with a game against local rivals Bryansford. Kilcoo came out on top winning 2–9 to 1–9. Next up was county champions Mayobridge in a waterlogged Hilltown pitch. Kilcoo, who went into this match as the underdog, rallied in the last five minutes to come from six points down to win 1–10 to 1–8. In the semi-final against Burren, Kilcoo prevailed on a scoreline of 0–12 to 0–10, with goalkeeper Stephen Kane saving a penalty in the first half. Kilcoo had reached a first senior final since 1948, and had the chance to bridge a 72-year gap when the club last won the title in 1937. Only Loughinisland stood in the way. Kilcoo settled in the second half and came out on top, leaving Loughinisland scoreless in the second half also. The final was score 2–9 to 1–4. When the final whistle blew, the Kilcoo supporters invaded the pitch in celebration. Captain Gerard McEvoy collected the Frank O'Hare Cup, while Anthony Devlin collected the Man of the Match award. The team arrived back home to Kilcoo that evening to heroes welcome in front of a large crowd who assembled in the village.

The team then ventured into a first-ever Ulster Senior Club Football Championship campaign with a meeting against Donegal GAA club St Eunan's. Kilcoo won the game by a scoreline of 0–13 to 0–9. The next opponent was Derry GAA club The Loup. Kilcoo played well but were unable to hold onto the lead, and the match ended Loup 1–12 Kilcoo 1–11. In November 2010, Kilcoo Minors retained their title as they overcame Rostrevor to gain back-to-back titles. Kilcoo won the minor championship for the third consecutive year, beating Warrenpoint by a scoreline of 1–12 to 0–10, and the senior team also won the League, beating Mayobridge by a scoreline of 2–16 to 1–06.

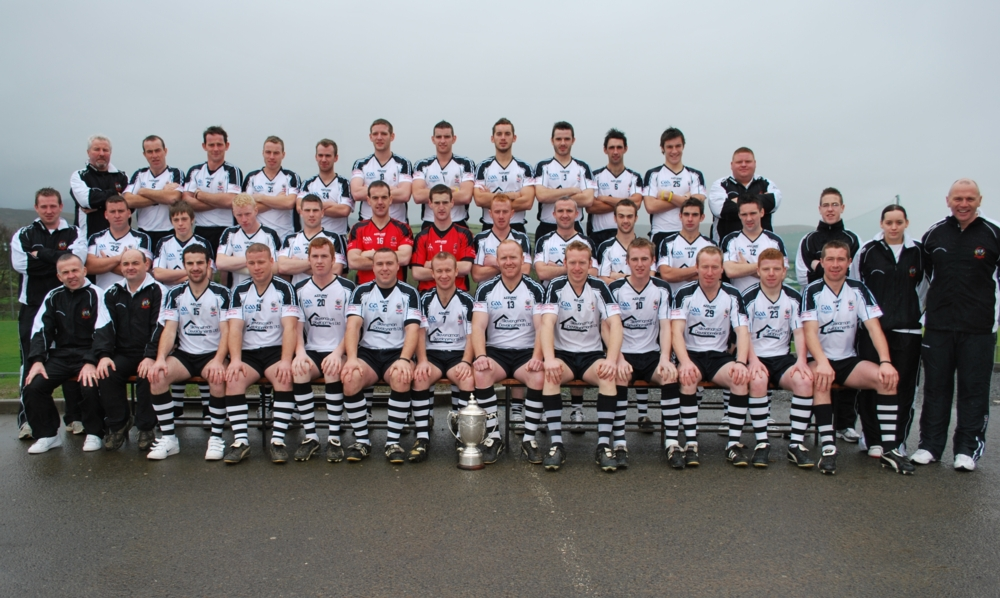
The Kilcoo team that won the 2009 Down Senior Football Championship

2012

Kilcoo won a second Down SFC title in four years, defeating Mayobridge. Conor Laverty scored a goal in the first minute of the final in Newry. Kilcoo withstood some late pressure to beat Mayobridge by a scoreline of 2–8 to 1-8, and regain the Down Club Championship.

2013

Three injury-time points helped Kilcoo snatch a 0–9 to 0–7 victory to retain the Down SFC title in Newry. Burren led by 0–7 to 0-6 as three minutes of stoppage time was signaled and Darragh O'Hanlon converted a 50-metre free to draw the sides level. Paul Devlin then landed a decisive free, and added an insurance point from play with the last kick of the game. Burren captain Dan McCartan was sent-off for a second yellow card offense during a last few minutes. It was Kilcoo's third Down SFC title in five years.

2014

Kilcoo completed a three-in-a-row of Down SFC titles with victory over Burren in Newry. Goals in each half by Ryan Johnston and late ones from Conor Laverty and Donal Kane helped Kilcoo ease to an easy win.

2015

Kilcoo won the Down SFC title again, this time with defeating Castlewellan on a scoreline of 0-11 to Kilcoo's 3–10.

2016

Kilcoo completed a historic five-in-a-row in Down by defeating Clonduff 3–11 to 0–9 in the 2016 final at Páirc Esler.

2017

Kilcoo clinched a sixth successive Down SFC title by edging out Burren 0–13 to 0–11 at Newry. Four Donal O'Hare points helped Burren lead 0–7 to 0–6 at half-time, and the St Mary's club still led 0–9 to 0-8 five minutes into the second half. However, Kilcoo hit five of the last seven points, as Dylan Ward and Paul Devlin both finished with four points.

2018 onwards

In the 2018 county final, Burren prevented Kilcoo from landing a record seventh straight Down SFC title with a 2–12 to 2–9 win.

Mickey Moran took over as Kilcoo manager ahead of the 2019 season. The Magpies regained the county title thanks to a Dylan Ward goal in the 51st minute to see off St Peter's Warrenpoint. In a tight match, Kilcoo emerged victorious by 1–12 to Warrenpoint's 0–14. Kilcoo went on to reach the Ulster Club SFC final for the third time. On 1 December 2019, Kilcoo won a first Ulster Club SFC title, with a narrow 2-11 to 2–9 win over Naomh Conaill.

In 2021, Kilcoo claimed a third consecutive Down SFC title after defeating Burren. The club then won a second Ulster Club SFC title, defeating Derrygonnelly in the final. After getting past St Finbarr's in the semi-final, Kilcoo reached the All-Ireland final for the second time. On 12 February 2022, Kilcoo faced Dublin champions Kilmacud Crokes in the All-Ireland Club SFC final. Jerome Johnston's late goal in extra-time secured a one-point win and the club's first All-Ireland title.

Karl Lacey was appointed as manager of Kilcoo for 2023, and led the club to the 2023 Down Senior Football Championship title. In November 2023, it was reported that he was to stay with Kilcoo for 2024. His departure from Kilcoo was announced at the end of January 2025, having led the club to the 2024 Down Senior Football Championship title and then to that year's Ulster Senior Club Football Championship final.

== Honours ==
- All-Ireland Senior Club Football Championship: (1)
  - 2021–22
- Ulster Senior Club Football Championship: (2)
  - 2019, 2021
- Down Senior Football Championship: (23)
  - 1917, 1922, 1925, 1926, 1927, 1928, 1932, 1933, 1937, 2009, 2012, 2013, 2014, 2015, 2016, 2017, 2019, 2020, 2021, 2022, 2023, 2024, 2025
- Down All-County Football League Division 1 winners: (8)
  - 1958, 2003, 2008, 2011, 2013, 2019, 2024, 2025
- Down Minor Football Championship: (5)
  - 1998, 2009, 2010, 2011, 2019

== See also ==
- List of Gaelic games clubs in Ireland
