= Russell Gaelic Union =

Gaelic football club, County Down, Northern Ireland

Russell Gaelic Union, Downpatrick
- Founded: 1926
- County: Down
- Nickname: Hoops
- Colours: White and Green
- Grounds: Páirc Tomás Ruséil, 100 Old Course Road, Downpatrick
- Coordinates: 54.317254°N 5.701774°W

Playing kits
Standard colours

Senior Club Championships
	All Ireland	Ulster champions	Down champions
Football:	-	-	6

Russell Gaelic Union, Downpatrick is a Gaelic football and ladies' Gaelic football club based in Downpatrick, County Down, Northern Ireland.

== History ==
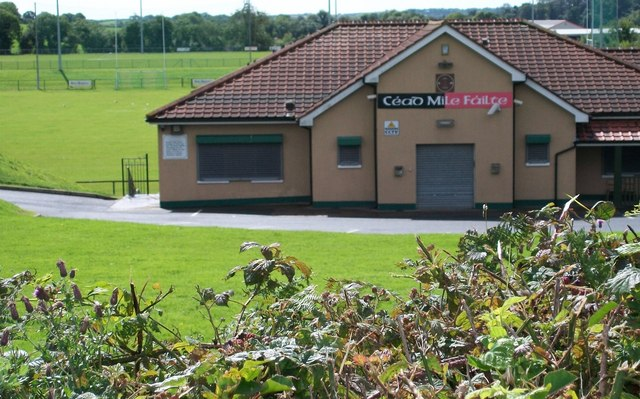
Clubhouse

The first Gaelic Athletic Association club in Downpatrick was founded in 1896, Clan Na Gael, mostly a hurling team. Gaelic football began to be popular in the 1910s. The games were outlawed during the Irish War of Independence (1918–22), but teams were refounded in 1924 and the St Patrick club affiliated in 1926.

Downpatrick won their first Down Senior Football Championship in 1935. In 1938–39 they moved to Leatham's field at Ballymote and renamed themselves The Thomas Russell Club, after Thomas Russell (1767–1803), executed at Downpatrick for his role in the Irish rebellion of 1803. Players were harassed by policemen of the Royal Ulster Constabulary, who uprooted their goalposts and sent officers to their games to intimidate them. In 1949 they became the Russell Gaelic Union.

Russell Gaelic Union won further county titles in 1972 and 1978

In the 1990s the team experienced great success both at a team level with RGU Downpatrick and more widely on the Down county team. Downpatrick won three county titles in four years, and reached the final of the 1993 Ulster Senior Club Football Championship, losing to Errigal Ciarán.

A ladies' team was founded in 1997.

In 2015 the club's grounds on Old Course Road were named as Down's second grounds (after Páirc Esler in Newry) and received £10,000 in funding from Down District Council.

RGU Downpatrick attracted some minor controversial press comment in 2018 when a brawl broke out at a league match against Ballyholland Harps. Both clubs were banned from the 2019 championship.

== Honours ==
=== Gaelic football ===
- Down Senior Football Championship (6): 1935, 1972, 1978, 1990, 1991, 1993
- Down Intermediate Football Championship (1): 2005
- Down Junior Football Championship (2): 1961, 1984
- Down Minor Football Championship (7): 1961, 1962, 1969, 1971, 1972, 1976, 1983

=== Hurling ===
- Down Junior Hurling Championship (1): 1945
