= Castlewellan GAC =

Gaelic Athletic Association club in Northern Ireland

- CLG Naomh Maolmhaodhóg, Caisleán Uidhilín
- Founded: 1905
- County: Down
- Nickname: The Town
- Colours: Green and Black
- Grounds: St Malachy's Park, Castlewellan
- Coordinates: 54°15′20″N 5°56′29″W

Playing kits
Standard colours

Senior Club Championships
	All Ireland	Ulster champions	Down champions
Football:	0	0	10

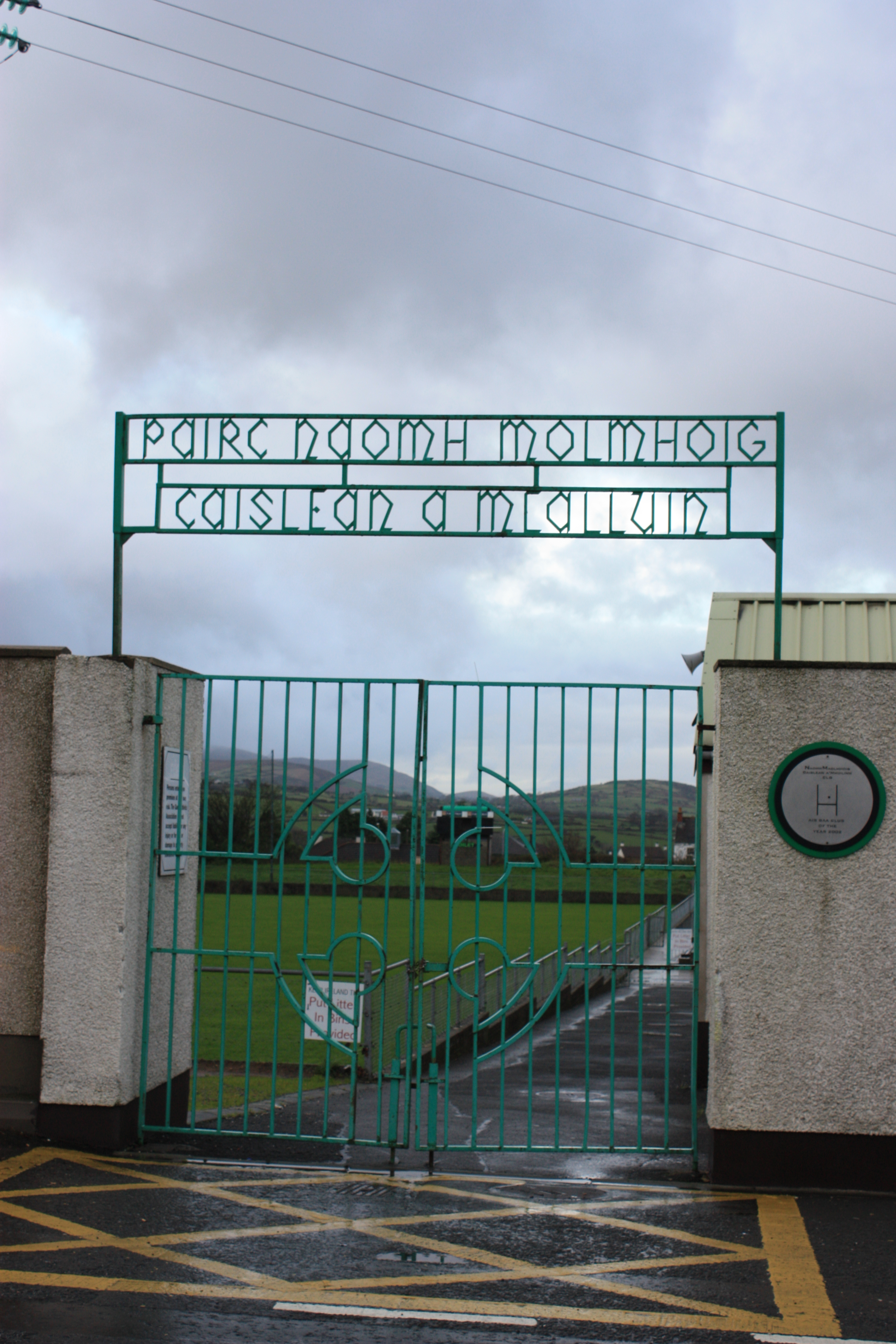
Castlewellan GAC, December 2009

Castlewellan GAC (also known as St Malachy's GAC, or in Irish, CLG Naomh Maolmhaodhóg, Caisleán Uidhilín) is a Gaelic Athletic Association club in Castlewellan, County Down, Northern Ireland. The club promotes the Gaelic games of hurling, Gaelic football, camogie and other cultural and social pursuits. The club was founded in 1905.

== Honours ==
Gaelic Football

- Down Senior Football Championship (10):
  - 1924, 1934, 1936, 1950, 1958, 1965, 1979, 1982, 1994, 1995
- Down Junior Football Championship (2):
  - 1920, 1993

Hurling

- Down Junior Hurling Championship (3):
  - 1999, 2025, 2026

== See also ==
- Down Senior Club Football Championship
- List of Gaelic Athletic Association clubs
