= Warrenpoint GAA =

St Peter's GAA
- Naomh Pheadair, Rinn Mhic Giolla Rua
- Founded: 1888
- County: Down
- Nickname: The Blues
- Colours: Blue and white
- Grounds: Páirc Liam Uí hÍr
- Coordinates: 54°06′11.68″N 6°13′41.08″W

Playing kits
Standard colours

Senior Club Championships
	All Ireland	Ulster champions	Down champions
Football:	-	-	3

St Peter's GAA (Irish: Cumann Pheadair Naofa) is a Gaelic Athletic Association club in Warrenpoint, County Down, Northern Ireland.

== Foundation ==
Gaelic games in Warrenpoint pre-date the formal formation of St Peter's as a club existed in the area from at least from 1888. The colours of this club, known as the John Martin club, were black and amber strips.

The club maintained this name until the mid-1920s until it fell on hard times. In 1931, it revived but because Glenn had registered a new club, John Martin some months before, the name of St Peter's was chosen and blue and white were chosen as the club colours.

The John Martin's of 1888 won the first competition held in Down by beating Mayobridge at Edenmore. The Warrenpoint flute band paraded the victors through Mayobridge village on the occasion.

There are no records of John Martin's winning many more competitions but once St Peter's found their feet they went on to win the Junior Championship in 1932 when they beat Saul in the final.

In the 1940s and 1950s, they won three senior titles.

For many years, the club played at Connolly's field at Moygannon and then at a variety of venues before settling in its current grounds at Moygannon which was purchased in 1972 for £10,000. Dressing rooms and showers were added in the 1980s at a cost of £45,000.

The first phase of a major redevelopment of Moygannon Park has recently been completed incorporating the construction of a new playing pitch surface. The cost of this development was £130,000. A new electronic scoreboard was also erected.

In the 1960s some derelict houses at Mary Street, Warrenpoint were purchased for £50. These were converted into small clubrooms using the voluntary labour of members and friends. The clubrooms were used for meetings, functions and fundraising. There were two rooms (upstairs and downstairs) each approximately 18 ft x 25 ft. The cost of rebuilding was £2,000 approximately.

An extension was added to the clubrooms in the 1970s giving a ground floor hall of 54 ft x 26 ft with a balcony 18 ft x 25 ft. Later a small kitchen was added. The total cost of this contract was £5,000.

Two dwellings were purchased either side of the clubrooms in Mary Street in the 1980s to facilitate future development of the clubrooms including an upstairs social club and bar. The total cost of this development was £46,000. The second house is still occupied by a tenant and rent is paid to St Peter's GAC.

In the 1970s an activity room 40 ft x 20 ft was also purchased for £10,000 and located at the back of the clubrooms. This room provided for supervised youth activity seven nights a week for 15 years. This property is no longer utilised. There is also a fully licensed bar on the premises.

The senior team is currently playing in Down Division 2.

== Club teams fielded ==
The club currently organises the following sides:

- Football (8 Teams) – U8, U10, U12, U14, U16, Minor, Premier Reserve and Senior (Div 1).
- Hurling (7 Teams) – U10, U12, U14, U16, Minor, Reserve(Div 2) and Senior (Div 1).
- Camogie (2 Teams) – U12, U14

== Honours ==
=== Football ===
- Down Senior Football Championship: 1943, 1948, 1953
- Down Junior Football Championship: 1932, 1940
- Down All County Football League Division 1: 2021
- Down Minor Football Championship: 1950, 1977, 2012
- Down Under-16 All County Football Championship: 1986, 2016
- Down Reserve Football Championship: 1996, 2012
- Down Intermediate Football Championship: 2001, 2012, 2014
- Underage South Down League Championship: 2006, 2014
- Down Senior Division 2 Championship: 2008
- Down Under-21 Football Championship: 2013, 2014

=== Hurling ===
- Ulster Senior Hurling League Championship (Div 5): 2008
- Down Junior Hurling Championship 2009, 2022

== Hurling ==
The panel entered into the Ulster league for a second year running after reaching the quarter-finals stages of section-3 last season. The Ulster League campaign allowed the senior team finish in mid-table.

In 2019, the club won Division 2 and earned promotion to Division 1. After narrowly losing out in the 2020 championship final (played in 2021 due to the COVID-19 pandemic), the team won their second ever Junior hurling championship title defeating Castlewellan on a scoreline of 1–15 to 1–14 in Newry.

== Culture ==
The club has been involved in the revival of Irish Set Dancing and has organised annual set dancing competitions and workshops. In 1993, St Peter's Set Dancers (along with a number of musicians and singers) travelled to Normandy to participate in the annual Normandy Cultural Festival.

Since Warrenpoint hosted its first ceilí in 1917, the club has been involved in the GAA Scór cultural competitions and has been successful at All-Ireland level in both Scór and Scór na nÓg competitions. In 1978, the Junior team won the All-Ireland Scór na nÓg ceilí dancing title. Warrenpoint won the All-Ireland Scór set dancing title in 1982 and after several years of winning county and Ulster titles, the club won the Scór All-Ireland quiz title in 1996.

Irish language classes are organised for adults and juniors on a regular basis and the club is also been involved in drama. The club's brass band section, St Peter's Band, has also won several All-Ireland Awards.

In addition, two members of the club, Sighle Nic An Ultaigh and Belle O'Loughlin, have held the position of president of the Camogie Association. Sighle Nic An Ultaigh was also previously general secretary of the Camogie Association for 25 years, and is the author of the Down GAA history, Ó Shíol go Bláth.

== See also ==
- Down Senior Club Football Championship
- List of Gaelic Athletic Association clubs
