= AIB GAA Club Player Awards =

The AIB GAA Club Player Awards (also referred to as Club All Stars) are awarded annually to the best player in each of the 15 playing positions in Gaelic football and Hurling following the completion of the All-Ireland Senior Club Football Championship and the All-Ireland Senior Club Hurling Championship. Additionally, one person in each code is selected as Player of the Year. The ceremony occurs at Croke Park, with the first event having taken place on the evening of Saturday 21 April 2018. The evening involves a banquet. The winning players are selected by members of the media who have an interest in Gaelic games.

The awards were instituted in 2018, having been suggested by the Donegal County Board the previous year. Coman Goggins, Aaron Kernan, Eoin Larkin and Billy Morgan officially launched the first event. AIB (Allied Irish Banks) had, at that time, sponsored the competitions for almost three decades, hence the company's involvement.

Corofin won the first three available All-Ireland Club SFC titles after the awards were established. In those three years, Corofin players won 20 awards, and both Martin Farragher and Liam Silke were included in all three selections.

== 2018 ==
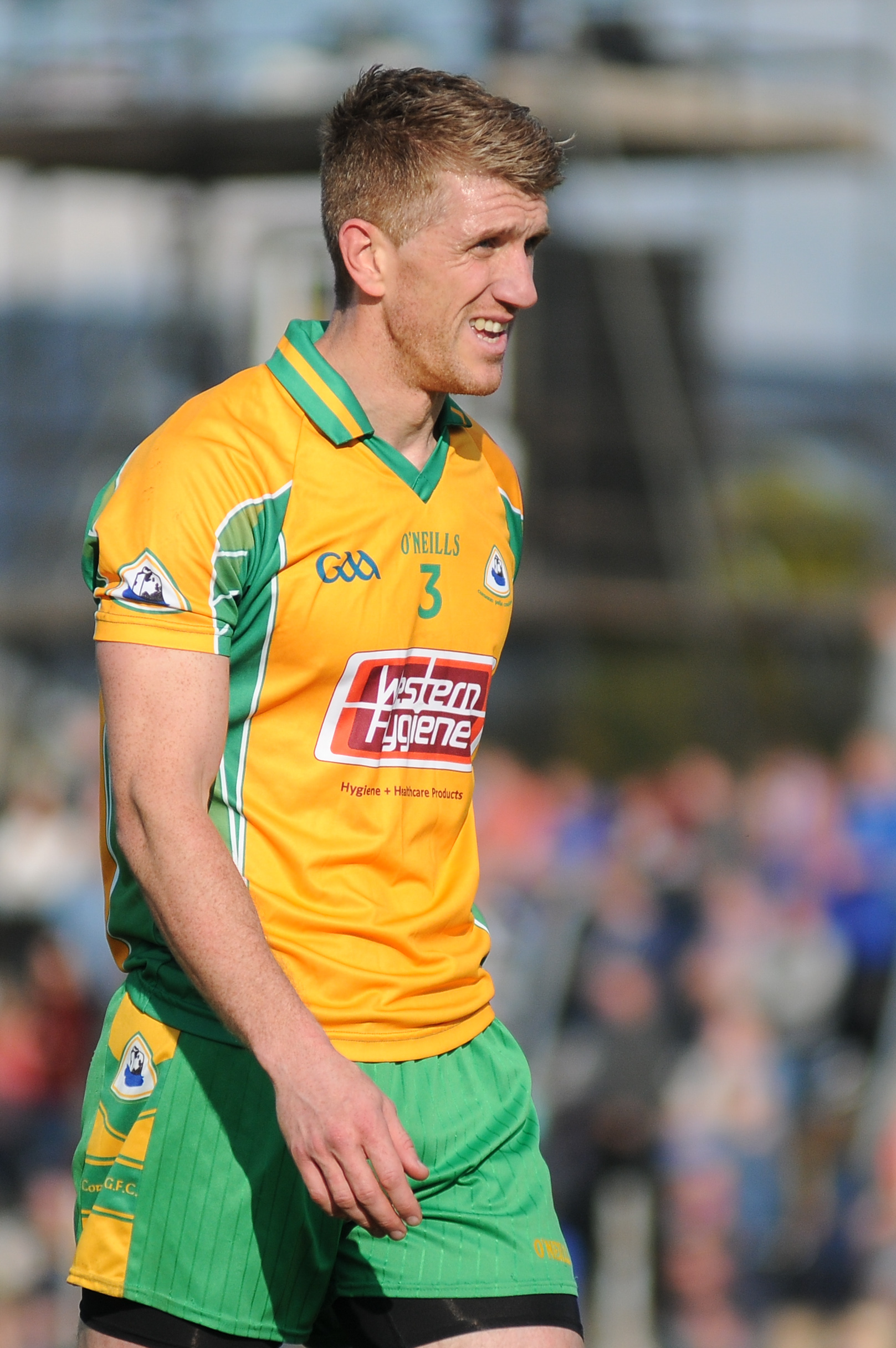
Kieran Fitzgerald was selected in 2018, and again in 2020.

Football Team of the Year

1. Antóin McMullan (Slaughtneil)
2. Liam Silke (Corofin)
3. Kieran Fitzgerald (Corofin)
4. Karl McKaigue (Slaughtneil)
5. James Murray (Moorefield)
6. Chrissy McKaigue (Slaughtneil)
7. Dylan Wall (Corofin)
8. Alan O'Donovan (Nemo Rangers)
9. Michael Farragher (Corofin)
10. Éanna O'Connor (Moorefield)
11. Christopher Bradley (Slaughtneil)
12. Ian Burke (Corofin)
13. Patrick McBrearty (Kilcar)
14. Luke Connolly (Nemo Rangers)
15. Martin Farragher (Corofin)

Footballer of the Year

- Liam Silke (Corofin)

Also nominated: Ian Burke (Corofin) & Michael Farragher (Corofin)

Hurling Team of the Year

1. Sean Brennan (Cuala)
2. Michael Casey (Na Piarsaigh)
3. Cian O'Callaghan (Cuala)
4. Alan Dempsey (Na Piarsaigh)
5. Cathall King (Na Piarsaigh)
6. Sean Moran (Cuala)
7. Philip Mahony (Ballygunner)
8. Darragh O'Connell (Cuala)
9. Ronan Lynch (Na Piarsaigh)
10. David Treacy (Cuala)
11. Brandan Rogers (Slaughtneil)
12. Adrian Morrissey (Liam Mellows)
13. Adrian Breen (Na Piarsaigh)
14. Kevin Downes (Na Piarsaigh)
15. Con O'Callaghan (Cuala)

Hurler of the Year

- Sean Moran (Cuala)

Also nominated: Michael Casey (Na Piarsaigh) & Con O'Callaghan (Cuala)

== 2019 ==
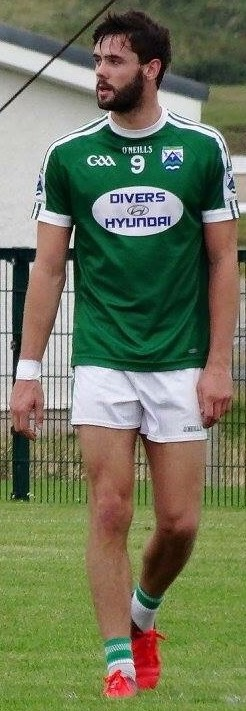
Odhrán Mac Niallais was selected in 2019.

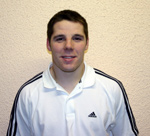
Kevin Cassidy was nominated for the Player of the Year award in 2019.

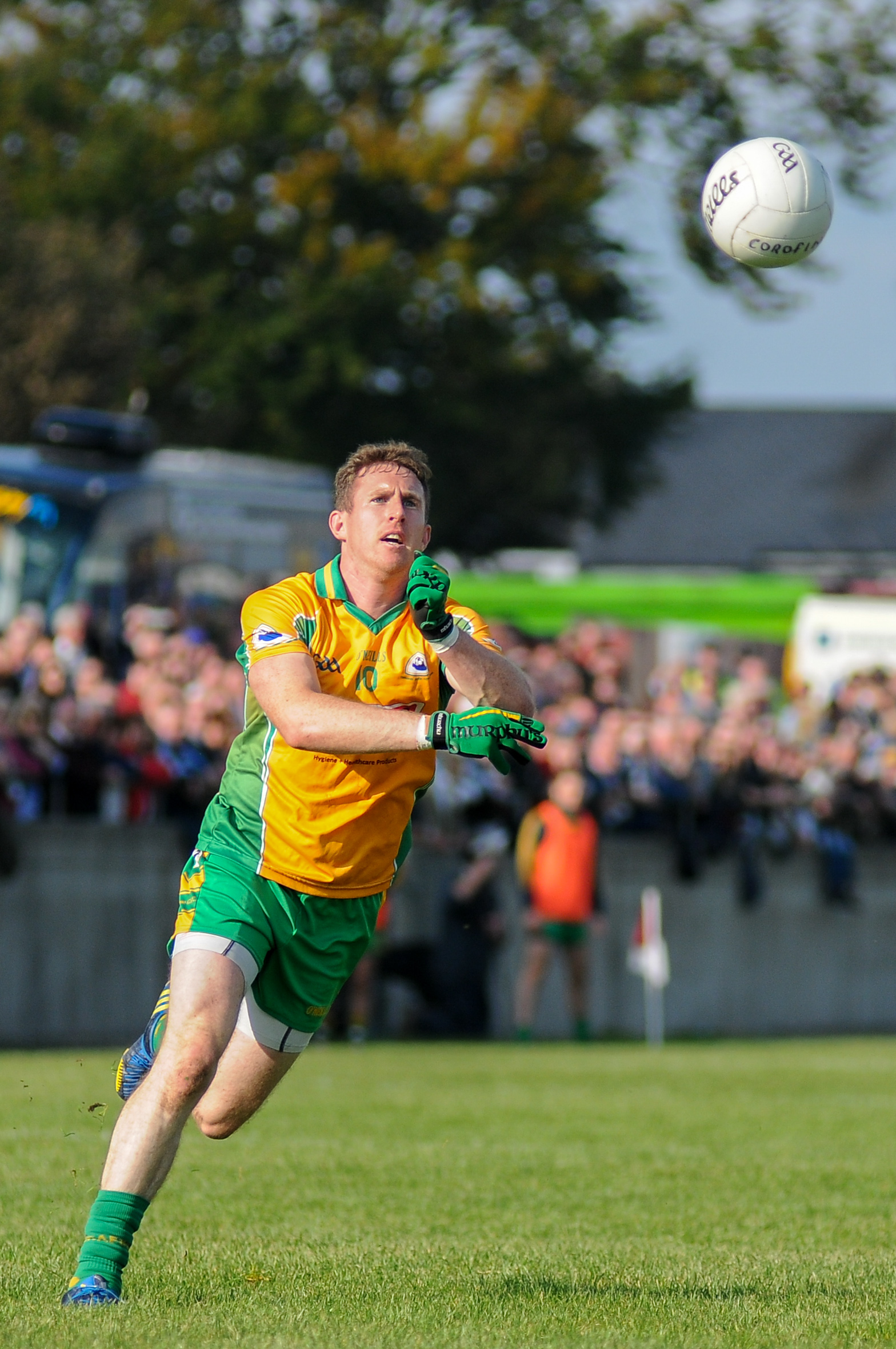
Gary Sice was nominated for the Player of the Year award in 2019, and selected again in 2020.

Football Team of the Year

1. Bernard Power (Corofin)
2. Liam Silke (Corofin)
3. Patrick Fox (Mullinalaghta)
4. Odhrán McFadden-Ferry (Gaoth Dobhair)
5. Kieran Molloy (Corofin)
6. Gavin White (Dr Crokes)
7. Donal McElligott (Mullinalaghta)
8. Daithí Burke (Corofin)
9. Odhrán Mac Niallais (Gaoth Dobhair)
10. Gary Sice (Corofin)
11. Kieran O'Leary (Dr Crokes)
12. Jason Leonard (Corofin)
13. Tony Brosnan (Dr Crokes)
14. Kevin Cassidy (Gaoth Dobhair)
15. Martin Farragher (Corofin)

Footballer of the Year

- Kieran Molloy (Corofin)

Also nominated: Kevin Cassidy (Gaoth Dobhair) & Gary Sice (Corofin)

Hurling Team of the Year

1. Stephen O'Keeffe (Ballygunner)
2. Eoghan Campbell (Ruairí Óg)
3. Joey Holden (Ballyhale Shamrocks)
4. Ian Kenny (Ballygunner)
5. Philip Mahony (Ballygunner)
6. Michael Fennelly (Ballyhale Shamrock)
7. Fintan Burke (St Thomas')
8. Shane O'Sullivan (Ballygunner)
9. Neil McManus (Ruairí Óg)
10. Adrian Mullen (Ballyhale Shamrocks)
11. TJ Reid (Ballyhale Shamrocks)
12. Pauric Mahony (Ballygunner)
13. Eoin Cody (Ballyhale Shamrocks)
14. Colin Fennelly (Ballyhale Shamrocks)
15. Brian Carroll (Coolderry)

Hurler of the Year

- Adrian Mullen (Ballyhale Shamrocks)

Also nominated: Colin Fennelly (Ballyhale Shamrocks) & Pauric Mahony (Ballygunner)

== 2020 ==
Football Team of the Year

1. Bernard Power (Corofin)
2. Aaron Branagan (Kilcoo)
3. Kieran Fitzgerald (Corofin)
4. Liam Silke (Corofin)
5. Kevin O'Donovan (Nemo Rangers)
6. Robbie McDaid (Ballyboden St Enda's)
7. Darryl Branagan (Kilcoo)
8. Daithí Burke (Corofin)
9. Ronan Steede (Corofin)
10. Gary Sice (Corofin)
11. Paul Devlin (Kilcoo)
12. Seán Gannon (Éire Óg)
13. Colm Basquel (Ballyboden St Enda's)
14. Martin Farragher (Corofin)
15. Conor Laverty (Kilcoo)

Footballer of the Year

- Ronan Steede (Corofin)

Also nominated: Darryl Branagan (Kilcoo) & Liam Silke (Corofin)

Hurling Team of the Year

1. James McCormack (Borris-Ileigh)
2. Paddy Stapleton (Borris-Ileigh)
3. Joey Holden (Ballyhale Shamrocks)
4. Darren Mullen (Ballyhale Shamrocks)
5. Evan Shefflin (Ballyhale Shamrocks)
6. Brandan Maher (Borris-Ileigh)
7. Shane Cooney (St Thomas')
8. Dan McCormack (Borris-Ileigh)
9. Chrissy McKaigue (Slaughtneil)
10. Brendan Rogers (Slaughtneil)
11. TJ Reid (Ballyhale Shamrocks)
12. Jerry Kelly (Borris-Ileigh)
13. Dessie Hutchinson (Ballygunner)
14. Colin Fennelly (Ballyhale Shamrocks)
15. Martin Kavanagh (St Mullins)

Hurler of the Year

- Brandan Maher (Borris-Ileigh)

Also nominated: TJ Reid (Ballyhale Shamrocks) & Evan Shefflin (Ballyhale Shamrocks)

== 2023 ==
Team of the Year

1. Conor Ferris (Kilmacud Crokes)
2. Michael Warnock (Glen)
3. Ryan Dougan (Glen)
4. Dan O'Brien (Kilmacud Crokes)
5. Andrew McGowan (Kilmacud Crokes)
6. Rory O'Carroll (Kilmacud Crokes)
7. Ethan Doherty (Glen)
8. David Moran (Kerins O'Rahilly's)
9. Emmett Bradley (Glen)
10. Jack Doherty (Glen)
11. Shane Cunningham (Kilmacud Crokes)
12. Seán Kelly (Moycullen)
13. Dara Mullin (Kilmacud Crokes)
14. Danny Tallon (Glen)
15. Shane Walsh (Kilmacud Crokes)

Footballer of the Year

- Shane Cunningham (Kilmacud Crokes)

Also nominated: Ryan Dougan (Glen) & Dara Mullin (Kilmacud Crokes)

== 2024 ==
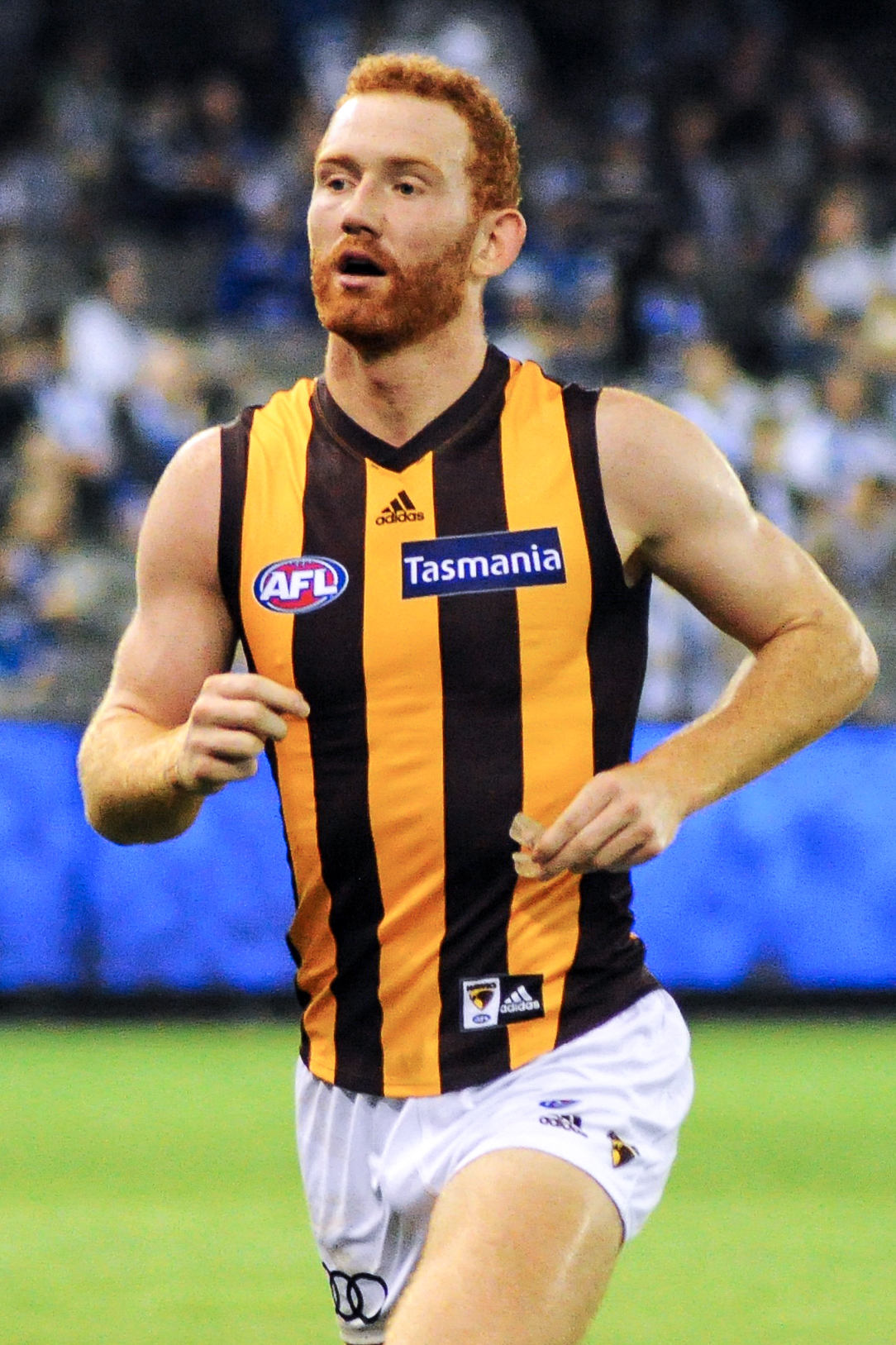
Conor Glass won the Player of the Year award in 2024.

Team of the Year

1. Rory Beggan (Scotstown)
2. Ryan Dougan (Glen)
3. Brian Stack (St Brigid's)
4. Pearse Frost (St Brigid's)
5. Ruaidhrí Fallon (St Brigid's)
6. Ciarán McFaul (Glen)
7. Michael Warnock (Glen)
8. Conor Glass (Glen)
9. Emmett Bradley (Glen)
10. Eunan Mulholland (Glen)
11. Paul Mannion (Kilmacud Crokes)
12. Shane Walsh (Kilmacud Crokes)
13. Ben O'Carroll (St Brigid's)
14. Darragh Kirwan (Naas)
15. Brian Hurley (Castlehaven)

Neither of Beggan or Kirwan's clubs won a provincial championship.

Footballer of the Year

- Conor Glass (Glen)

Also nominated: Ben O'Carroll (St Brigid's) & Shane Walsh (Kilmacud Crokes)

== 2025 ==
Team of the Year

1. Keelan Harte (Coolera–Strandhill)
2. Seán Taylor (Coolera–Strandhill)
3. Michael Fitzsimons (Cuala)
4. Charlie McMorrow (Cuala)
5. Peter Óg McCartan (Errigal Ciarán)
6. Brian Looney (Dr Crokes)
7. David O'Dowd (Cuala)
8. Peadar Ó Cofaigh Byrne (Cuala)
9. Joe Oguz (Errigal Ciarán)
10. Micheál Burns (Dr Crokes)
11. Peter Harte (Errigal Ciarán)
12. Ruairí Canavan (Errigal Ciarán)
13. Niall O'Callaghan (Cuala)
14. Con O'Callaghan (Cuala)
15. Darragh Canavan (Errigal Ciarán)

Footballer of the Year

- Con O'Callaghan (Cuala)

Also nominated: Micheál Burns (Dr Crokes) & Ruairí Canavan (Errigal Ciarán)

== See also ==
- GAA GPA All Stars Awards
