= 2023–24 All-Ireland Senior Club Football Championship =

Gaelic football competition

- Dates: 21 October 2023 – 21 January 2024
- Teams: 32
- Sponsor: Allied Irish Banks
- Champions: Glen (1st title); Connor Carville (captain); Malachy O'Rourke (manager)
- Runners-up: St Brigid's; Paul McGrath (captain); Jerome Stack (manager)

Tournament statistics
- Matches played: 31
- Goals scored: 53 (1.71 per match)
- Points scored: 648 (20.9 per match)
- Top scorer(s): Brian Hurley (Castlehaven) (1–27)

Provincial Champions
- Munster: Castlehaven
- Leinster: Kilmacud Crokes
- Ulster: Glen
- Connacht: St Brigid's

The 2023–24 All-Ireland Senior Club Football Championship was the 53rd staging of the All-Ireland Senior Club Football Championship, the Gaelic Athletic Association's premier inter-county club Gaelic football tournament. The draws for the respective provincial championships took place at various stages. The competition ran from 21 October 2023 to 21 January 2024.

The defending champion was Kilmacud Crokes; however, the club lost to Glen in the All-Ireland Club SFC semi-final.

The final was played on 21 January 2024 at Croke Park in Dublin, between Glen and St Brigid's, in what was their first ever championship meeting. Glen won the match by 2–10 to 1–12 to claim a first title.

Castlehaven's Brian Hurley was the competition's top scorer, finishing with 1–27.

== Teams ==
Team	County	Captain(s)	Manager	Most recent success		
Team	County	Captain(s)	Manager	All-Ireland	Provincial	County
Ballina Stephenites	Mayo	Mike Murray; Dylan Thornton	Niall Heffernan	2005	2007	2007
Blessington	Wicklow	Kevin Hanlon	Brian Cardiff			2021
Castlehaven	Cork	Mark Collins	James McCarthy		1997	2013
Clonmel Commercials	Tipperary	Séamus Kennedy	Tommy Morrissey		2015	2022
Coolera–Strandhill	Sligo	Peter Laffey	Adrian McPartland			2005
Corofin	Galway	Dylan McHugh	Kevin Johnson	2020	2019	2019
Cratloe	Clare	Kevin Harnett	Colm Collins			2014
Crossmaglen Rangers	Armagh	Jamie Clarke	Anthony Cunningham	2012	2015	2022
Derrygonnelly Harps	Fermanagh	Shane McGullion	Seán Flanagan			2021
Dingle	Kerry	Paul Geaney	Pádraig Corcoran			1948
Éire Óg	Carlow	Jordan Morrissey	Turlough O'Brien		1998	2020
Erin's Own	Antrim	James Laverty	Ronan Devlin			2022
Fulham Irish	London	Michael Clarke	Lorcan Mulvey			2020
Glen	Derry	Connor Carville	Malachy O'Rourke		2022	2022
Gowna	Cavan	Ryan McGahern	Fintan Reilly; Dermot McCabe			2022
Kilcoo	Down	Darryl Branagan; Aaron Morgan	Karl Lacey	2022	2021	2022
Killoe Young Emmets	Longford	Cian Farrelly	Luke Dempsey			2020
Kilmacud Crokes	Dublin	Shane Cunningham	Robbie Brennan	2023	2022	2022
Mohill	Leitrim	Shane Quinn	Eamonn O'Hara			2020
Naas	Kildare	Eoin Doyle	Joe Murphy			2022
Naomh Conaill	Donegal	Ultan Doherty	Martin Regan			2022
Newcastle West	Limerick	Iain Corbett	Jimmy Lee			2022
Rathgormack	Waterford	Willie Hahessy	Kenny Hassett			2019
Scotstown	Monaghan	David McCague	Damien McArdle		1989	2021
St Loman's	Westmeath	John Heslin	Declan Kelly			2021
Shelmaliers	Wexford	Eoghan Nolan	Ronan Joyce			2021
St Brigid's	Roscommon	Mark Daly; Paul McGrath	Jerome Stack	2013	2012	2020
St Mary's	Louth	Dáire McConnon	Cathal Murray			2022
St Joseph's	Laois	Brian Daly	Mick Dempsey			2000
Summerhill	Meath	Pádhraig Geraghty	Conor Gillespie		1977	2013
Tullamore	Offaly	Michael Brazil; Declan Hogan	Niall Stack			2021
Trillick St Macartan's	Tyrone	Rory Brennan	Jody Gormley			2019

== Connacht ==
Quarter-finals
Coolera–Strandhill (Sligo)	1-03
St Brigid's (Roscommon)	0-13
Ballina Stephenites (Mayo)	3-11
Fulham Irish (London)	0-05

Semi-finals
St Brigid's (Roscommon)	1-07
Mohill (Leitrim)	0-08
Corofin (Galway)	0-16
Ballina Stephenites (Mayo)	0-12

Final
St Brigid's (Roscommon)	1-13
Corofin (Galway)	2-05

=== Quarter-finals ===
11 November 2023 Quarter-final	Ballina Stephenites (Mayo)	3-11 (20) – (5) 0-05	Fulham Irish (London)	MacHale Park
	C McStay (1-2), N Feeney (1-1), F Irwin (0-4, 3f), M Murray (1-0), C Treacy (0-2), C Boland (0-1), L Feeney (0-1)	Report	N O’Leary (0-3, 3f), J Goulding (0-2, 1f)	Referee: C Ryan (Galway)

12 November 2023 Quarter-final	Coolera–Strandhill (Sligo)	1-03 (6) – (13) 0-13	St Brigid's (Roscommon)	Dr Hyde Park
	L Doherty (1-0), S Taylor (0-1), K Cawley (0-1), A Higgins (0-1)	Report	B O’Carroll (0-6, 2f), B Nugent (0-2), C Hand (0-2), P McGrath (0-1), E Nolan (0-1), J Cunningham (0-1)	Referee: T Murphy (Galway)

=== Semi-finals ===
18 November 2023 Semi-final	Corofin (Galway)	0-16 (16) – (12) 0-12	Ballina Stephenites (Mayo)	Pearse Stadium
	Jack McCabe (0-05), Gary Sice (0-05, 0-02f), Dylan McHugh (0-02), Patrick Egan (0-02), Michael Lundy (0-02)	Report	Evan Regan (0-05, 0-04f, 0-01m), Frank Irwin (0-03, 0-01f), Ciaran Boland (0-01), Jack Irwin (0-01), Conor McStay (0-01), Mark Dirrane (0-01)	Referee: Barry Judge (Sligo)

19 November 2023 Semi-final	St Brigid's (Roscommon)	1-07 (10) – (8) 0-08	Mohill (Leitrim)	Dr Hyde Park
	Ciarán Sugrue (1-00), Bobby Nugent (0-03f), Ronan Stack (0-01), Ben O’Carroll (0-01f), Brian Derwin (0-01), John Cunningham (0-01)	Report	Keith Beirne (0-04, 0-1f), Domhnaill Flynn (0-01), Conor Quinn (0-01), Ronan Kennedy (0-01), Jordan Reynolds (0-01)	Referee: James Molloy (Galway)

=== Final ===
3 December 2023 Final	St Brigid's (Roscommon)	1-13 (16) – (11) 2-05	Corofin (Galway)	Dr Hyde Park
	Ben O’Carroll (1-07, 0-04f, 1-00 pen), Bobby Nugent (0-03, 0-03f), Brian Stack (0-01), Ruaidhri Fallon (0-01), Ciarán Sugrue (0-01)	Report	Liam Silke (1-00), Dylan McHugh (1-00), Gary Sice (0-02, 0-01f), Jack McCabe (0-02), Darragh Silke (0-01, 0-01 '45)	Referee: Barry Judge (Sligo)

== Leinster ==
Preliminary round
St Loman's (Westmeath)	1-10
Shelmaliers (Wexford)	1-08
Tullamore (Offaly)	1-07
Summerhill (Meath)	1-09
Éire Óg (Carlow)	2-18
St Joseph's (Laois)	3-13

Quarter-finals
Killoe (Longford)	1-10
St Loman's (Westmeath)	1-20
Naas (Kildare)	2-12
Summerhill (Meath)	0-08
Blessington (Wicklow)	2-05
St Mary's (Louth)	3-09
Éire Óg (Carlow)	0-04
Kilmacud Crokes (Dublin)	1-12

Semi-finals
St Loman's (Westmeath)	1-10
Naas (Kildare)	1-15
St Mary's (Louth)	1-11
Kilmacud Crokes (Dublin)	1-16

Final
Naas (Kildare)	0-10
Kilmacud Crokes (Dublin)	1-14

=== First round ===
21 October 2023 First round	Éire Óg (Carlow)	2-18 (24) – (22) 3-13 (a.e.t.)	St Joseph's (Laois)	Dr Cullen Park
	Adam McCarron (0-06, 0-04f), Josh Brady (1-01, 1-00 pen), David Dunphy (1-00), Colm Hulton (0-03), Ross Dunphy (0-02), Murtough Ware (0-02, 0-01m), Jordan Morrissey (0-02, 0-02f), Diarmuid Ruth (0-01), Kyle Nolan (0-01)	Report	Eoghan O'Flaherty (0-07, 0-03f), Brian Daly (1-01), Danny Hickey (1-00), Dylan Doyle (1-00), Michael Keogh (0-02), Oisin Hooney (0-02), Josh O'Brien (0-01)	Referee: Patrick Coyle (Meath)

22 October 2023 First round	Tullamore (Offaly)	1-07 (10) – (12) 1-09	Summerhill (Meath)	O'Connor Park
	Declan Hogan (1-01), Nigel Bracken (0-02, 0-02f), Michael Brazil (0-01, 0-01f), Diarmuid Egan (0-01), Harry Plunkett (0-01), Cormac Egan (0-01)	Report	Eoghan Frayne (0-04, 0-04f), Kevin Ryan (1-0), Barry Dardis (0-02, 0-02f), Jamie O’Shea (0-01), Diarmuid McCabe (0-01), Conor Frayne (0-01)	Referee: B Tiernan (Dublin)

22 October 2023 First round	St Loman's (Westmeath)	1-10 (13) – (11) 1-08	Shelmaliers (Wexford)	Cusack Park
	S Dempsey (0-04), E Hogan (1-00), J Heslin (0-03, 0-03 frees), E Gaffney (0-01), D McCartan (0-01), R O’Toole (0-01)	Report	C McCabe (1-00, pen), C Hearne (0-03), E Doyle (0-02), A Murphy (0-01), E Nolan (0-01, free), E O’Gara (0-01)	Referee: S Mulhare (Laois)

=== Quarter-finals ===
4 November 2023 Quarter-final	Éire Óg (Carlow)	0-04 (4) – (15) 1-12	Kilmacud Crokes (Dublin)	Dr Cullen Park
	Benny Kavanagh (0-1), Jordan Morrissey (0-1f), Colm Hulton (0-1), Adam McCarron (0-1f)	Report	Shane Walsh (1-2 45 f), Dara Mullin (0-4), Andy McGowan (0-2), Mark O’Leary (0-1), Brian Sheehy (0-1), Paul Mannion (0-1), Dan O’Brien (0-1)	Referee: Fintan Pierce

5 November 2023 Quarter-final	Killoe Young Emmets (Longford)	1-10 (13) – (23) 1-20	St Loman's (Westmeath)	Pearse Park
	D Mimnagh (1-01, 0-1'45'), M Hughes (0-03, 0-01f), P Kiernan (0-01), D McGoldrick (0-01), M Quinn (0-01), P Moran (0-01), C Coyle (0-01), R McGoldrick (0-01)	Report	R O’Toole (1-02), J Heslin (0-05, 0-04f), S Dempsey (0-05, 0-01m), S McCartan (0-04, 0-01‘45’), D McCartan (0-03, 0-01f, 0-01m), S Flanagan (0-01)	Referee: Anthony Nolan

5 November 2023 Quarter-final	Naas (Kildare)	2-12 (18) – (8) 0-08	Summerhill (Meath)	Hawkfield
	Eoghan Prizeman (1-00), Sean Hanafin (1-00), Alex Beirne (0-03), Darragh Kirwan (0-03, 0-01f), Eamonn Callaghan (0-02, 0-02f), Luke Mullins (0-01, 0-01f), James Burke (0-01), Jack McKevitt (0-01), Kevin Cummins (0-01, 0-01f)	Report	Eoghan Frayne (0-06, 0-05f), Conor Frayne (0-01), Barry Dardis (0-01)	Referee: Alan Coyne

5 November 2023 Quarter-final	Blessington (Wicklow)	2-05 (11) – (18) 3-09	St Mary's (Louth)	Aughrim
	D Cooney (1-0), J Gilligan (1-0), K Quinn (0-3, 1f, 1m), M O’Connor (0-2, 1f)	Report	T Jackson (2-0), C Keenan (0-4), D McConnon (1-1), L Jackson (0-2), J Commins (0-1), D Clarke (0-1 1f)	Referee: Patrick Maguire

=== Semi-finals ===
19 November 2023 Semi-final	St Loman's (Westmeath)	1-10 (13) – (18) 1-15 (a.e.t.)	Naas (Kildare)	Cusack Park
	S Dempsey (1-02), J Heslin (0-04, 0-04f), D McCartan (0-02, 0-01m), P Foy (0-01), K Regan (0-01)	Report	D Kirwan (1-07, 0-01f), A Beirne (0-03, 0-02f), L Mullins (0-01, ‘45’), J McKevitt (0-01), D Hanafin (0-01), E Callaghan (0-01, f), T Browne (0-01)	Referee: David Gough (Meath)

19 November 2023 Semi-final	St Mary's (Louth)	1-11 (14) – (19) 1-16	Kilmacud Crokes (Dublin)	Páirc Mhuire, Ardee
	Ryan Mooney (1-00), Ciaran Keenan (0-03, 0-03m), Jonathan Commins (0-03, 0-03f), Carl Gillespie (0-02, 0-02f), Liam Jackson (0-01), Tom Jackson (0-01, 0-01f), Daire McConnon (0-01)	Report	Shane Walsh (0-05, 0-03f), Paul Mannion (0-05), Darragh Dempsey (1-00), Cian O'Connor (0-01), Andrew McGowan (0-01), Shane Cunningham (0-01), Shane Horan (0-01), Luke Ward (0-01), Dara Mullin (0-01)	Referee: Brendan Cawley (Kildare)

=== Final ===
2 December 2023 Final	Naas (Kildare)	0-10 (10) – (17) 1-14	Kilmacud Crokes (Dublin)	Croke Park
14:15 IWT	Alex Beirne (0-04), Darragh Kirwan (0-04, 0-02f), Paul McDermott (0-01), Dermot Hanafin (0-01)	Report	Shane Walsh (1-08, 0-05f), Shane Horan (0-02), Paul Mannion (0-01, 0-01f), Dara Mullin (0-01), Rory O'Carroll (0-01), Craig Dias (0-01)	Referee: David Hickey

== Munster ==
Quarter-finals
Clonmel Commercials (Tipperary)	2-07
Newcastle West (Limerick)	0-06
Castlehaven (Cork)	1-12
Cratloe (Clare)	0-11

Semi-finals
Clonmel Commercials (Tipperary)	0-10
Dingle (Kerry)	0-13
Rathgormack (Waterford)	1-07
Castlehaven (Cork)	1-16

Final
Dingle (Kerry)	0-13 (3)
Castlehaven (Cork)	0-13 (4)

=== Quarter-finals ===
12 November 2023 Quarter-final	Clonmel Commercials (Tipperary)	2-07 (13) – (6) 0-06	Newcastle West (Limerick)	Semple Stadium
	P McGarry (1-0), S O’Connor (1-0), K Fahey (0-2), S Kennedy (0-1), P Looram (0-1), Colman Kennedy (0-1), M Quinlivan (0-1), J Kennedy (0-01f)	Report	E Hurley (0-2, 2f), E Rigter (0-1), B Nix (0-1), E Hurley (0-1), T Quilligan (0-1, m)	Referee: C Maguire (Clare)

12 November 2023 Quarter-final	Castlehaven (Cork)	1-12 (15) – (11) 0-11 (a.e.t.)	Cratloe (Clare)	Páirc Uí Chaoimh
	Brian Hurley (0-07, 3f), Robbie Minihane (1-00), Jack Cahalane (0-02), Rory Maguire (0-01), Mark Collins (0-01)	Report	Cathal McInerney (0-04f), Conal O’Hanlon (0-02, 1m), Enda Boyce (0-02), David Collins (0-01), Diarmuid Ryan (0-01), Conor Ryan (0-01)	Referee: Jonathan Hayes (Limerick)

=== Semi-finals ===
26 November 2023 Semi-final	Clonmel Commercials (Tipperary)	0-10 (10) – (13) 0-13	Dingle (Kerry)	Semple Stadium
	S. O’Connor (0-4, 2 frees, 2 marks); J. Kennedy (0-2); R. Peters, C. Kennedy, P. McGarry, M. Quinlivan (0-1 each)	Report	D. Geaney (0-5): M. Flaherty, C. Geaney, P. Geaney (0-2 each); B.D. O’Sullivan, T. O’Sullivan (0-1 each)	Referee: J. Ryan (Cork)

26 November 2023 Semi-final	Rathgormack (Waterford)	1-07 (10) – (19) 1-16	Castlehaven (Cork)	Fraher Field
	Billy Power 1-0; Jason Curry 0-4 (2fs, 1 ’45); Jason Gleeson 0-2 (2fs); Adam Murray 0-1	Report	Brian Hurley 1-6 (4fs, 1 ’45); Michael Hurley 0-5; Cathal Maguire, Sean Browne, Mark Collins, Conor O’Driscoll, Jack Cahalane 0-1	Referee: Sean Lonergan (Tipperary)

=== Final ===
10 December 2023 Final	Dingle (Kerry)	0-13 (13) – (13) 0-13 (a.e.t.) (3–4 p)	Castlehaven (Cork)	TUS Gaelic Grounds
14:00 IWT	P Geaney (0-3 f), C Geaney (0-3 f), 0-4 each, N Geaney, C Flannery, M Flaherty, T O’Sullivan, D Geaney 0-1 each.	Report	B Hurley 0-7 (0-4 f, 0-1 45), C Maguire 0-4 (0-1 mark), M Collins 0-2.	Referee: D O'Mahoney (Tipperary)

== Ulster ==
Preliminary round
Derrygonnelly (Fermanagh)	1-07
Kilcoo (Down)	2-13

Quarter-finals
Glen (Derry)	0-11
Erin's Own, Cargin (Antrim)	0-07
Gowna (Cavan)	1-10
Naomh Conaill (Donegal)	2-08
Trillick St Macartan's (Tyrone)	0-09
Crossmaglen (Armagh)	0-04
Kilcoo (Down)	1-08
Scotstown (Monaghan)	0-12

Semi-finals
Glen (Derry)	0-10
Naomh Conaill (Donegal)	1-06
Trillick St Macartan's (Tyrone)	1-13
Scotstown (Monaghan)	0-17

Final
Glen (Derry)	0-13
Scotstown (Monaghan)	0-11

=== Preliminary round ===
5 November 2023 Preliminary round	Derrygonnelly Harps (Fermanagh)	1-07 (10) – (19) 2-13	Kilcoo (Down)	Brewster Park
	Gary McKenna (1-1, 1f), Garvan Jones (0-4, 2f), Ryan Jones (0-01), Conall Jones (0-01, 1f)	Report	Paul Devlin (1-02, pen), Sean Og McCusker (1-01), Johnston (0-02), Eugene Brannigan (0-02), Niall Kane (0-01), Ryan McEvoy (0-01), Darryl Branagan (0-01), Aaron Morgan (0-01), Anthony Morgan (0-01), Ceilum Doherty (0-01)

=== Quarter-finals ===
11 November 2023 Quarter-final	Trillick St Macartan's (Tyrone)	0-09 (9) – (4) 0-04	Crossmaglen (Armagh)	Healy Park
	R Donnelly (0-02), R Gray (0-02), L Brennan (0-02, 1f), James Garrity (0-02), C Daly (0-01)	Report	J Clarke (0-02), R O’Neill (0-02, 2f)	Referee: Barry Cassidy (Derry)

12 November 2023 Quarter-final	Glen (Derry)	0-11 (11) – (7) 0-07	Erin's Own, Cargin (Antrim)	Celtic Park
	Emmett Bradley (0-04f), Jack Doherty (0-02), Danny Tallon (0-02f), Michael Warnock (0-01), Ciaran McFaul (0-01), Ethan Doherty (0-01)	Report	Pat Shivers (0-03f), Michael McCann (0-2f), Paul McCann (0-01), Kieran Close (0-01)	Referee: Conor Doureen (Cavan)

12 November 2023 Quarter-final	Gowna (Cavan)	1-10 (13) – (14) 2-08	Naomh Conaill (Donegal)	Breffni Park
	Conor Brady (1-1), Cian Madden (0-2, 1f), C Casey (0-1m), T Madden (0-1), R Donohoe (0-1), M McKeever (0-1), R Fitzpatrick (0-1), O Pierson (0-1f), Conor Madden (0-1)	Report	L McLoone (1-1), K McGettigan (1-0), O Doherty (0-2), E Doherty (0-1), J MacCeallbhuí (0-1), J O’Malley (0-1f), AJ Gallagher (0-1), B McDyer (0-1)	Referee: K Faloon (Armagh)

12 November 2023 Quarter-final	Kilcoo (Down)	1-08 (11) – (12) 0-12	Scotstown (Monaghan)	Páirc Esler
	P. Devlin (1-1, 1-0 p, 0-1 f), M. Rooney (0-1), D. Branagan (0-1), E. Branagan (0-1), Aaron Morgan (0-1), N. Kane (0-1, f), S. Johnston (0-1), Anthony Morgan (0-1)	Report	R. Beggan (0-3, 2 f), S. Carey (0-2), J. McCarron (0-2), J. Carey (0-2, 1m), C. McCarthy (0-1), D. Morgan (0-1), K. Hughes (0-1, 1m)	Referee: Noel Mooney (Cavan)

=== Semi-finals ===
25 November 2023 Semi-final	Glen (Derry)	0-10 (10) – (9) 1-06	Naomh Conaill (Donegal)	Healy Park
	Conleth McGuckian (1m) and Emmett Bradley (2fs) 0-3 each, Cathal Mulholland 0-2, Ciaran McFaul and Stevie O'Hara 0-1 each	Report	John O'Malley 1-0 (pen), Ciaran Thompson 0-3, Ethan O'Donnell, Brendan McDyer, and AJ Gallagher 0-1 each	Referee: Sean Hurson (Tyrone)

26 November 2023 Semi-final	Trillick St Macartan's (Tyrone)	1-13 (16) – (17) 0-17 (a.e.t.)	Scotstown (Monaghan)	Athletic Grounds
	L Brennan 0-5 (0-3fs, 0-1 45), S O’Donnell 1-1, R Brennan 0-1, R Donnelly 0-1, C Daly 0-1, R Gray 0-1, D Donnelly 0-1, J Garrity 0-1, C Garrity 0-1	Report	J McCarron 0-4 (0-3fs), S Carey 0-3 (0-2fs), M Maguire 0-2, K Hughes 0-2, R Beggan 0-1 (0-1 45), R O’Toole 0-1, C McCarthy 0-1, D Morgan 0-1, E Caulfield 0-1, M McCarville 0-1	Referee: K Faloon (Armagh)

=== Final ===
10 December 2023 Final	Glen (Derry)	0-13 (13) – (11) 0-11	Scotstown (Monaghan)	Athletic Grounds
16:00 GMT	D Tallon (2 frees), E Mulholland (0-3 each); C Glass (0-2, 1 free); R Dougan, E Doherty, T Flanagan, C McFaul, J McDermott (0-1 each).	Report	S Carey (0-3, 3 frees); K Hughes, J Hamill (0-2 each); J McCarron, C McCarthy, D Hughe, R Beggan (0-1 each).

== Semi-finals ==
7 January 2024 Semi-final	St Brigid's (Roscommon)	1-11 (14) – (10) 0-10	Castlehaven (Cork)	Semple Stadium
13:45 IWT (UTC±0)	B Derwin 1-1, B Nugent (1f), B O‘Carroll (1 pen) 0-3 each, C Sugrue, R Dolan, J Cunningham, P McGrath 0-1 each.	Report	B Hurley 0-7 (3f, 1 ‘45’), C Maguire 0-2, M Hurley 0-1.	Referee: D Coldrick

7 January 2024 Semi-final	Glen (Derry)	1-14 (17) – (16) 2-10	Kilmacud Crokes (Dublin)	Páirc Esler
15:45 IWT (UTC±0)	D Tallon 0-5 (4fs), E Doherty 1-0, E Bradley 0-3 (2fs), M Warnock, C McFaul, C Mulholland, C Glass, E Mulholland, A Doherty all 0-1 each.	Report	S Walsh 1-2 (0-1 45), P Mannion 0-4 (2fs), H Kenny 1-0, D Higgins, C O'Connor, L Ward, M O'Leary all 0-1 each.	Referee: Conor Lane (Cork)

== Final ==
21 January 2024 Final	Glen (Derry)	2-10 (16) – (15) 1-12	St Brigid's (Roscommon)	Croke Park
15:00 IWT (UTC±0)	C Glass 1-2 (1 ‘45’), E Bradley 0-4 (3f), J McDermott 1-0, C McFaul, E Doherty, M Warnock, C McGuckian 0-1 each.	Report	B Derwin 1-1, B O’Carroll 0-3 (2f, 1m), R Fallon, E Nolan 0-2 each, B Stack, B Nugent, C Sugrue, S Cunnane (f) 0-1 each.	Referee: Brendan Cawley (Kildare)

== Bracket ==
Semi-finals		Final
Glen (Derry)	1-14
Kilmacud Crokes (Dublin)	2-10	Glen (Derry)	2-10
Castlehaven (Cork)	0-10	St Brigid's (Roscommon)	1-12
St Brigid's (Roscommon)	1-11

== Statistics ==
=== Top scorers ===
Overall

Rank	Player	Club	Tally	Total	Matches	Average
1	Brian Hurley	Castlehaven	1-27	30	4	7.50
2	Shane Walsh	Kilmacud Crokes	3-17	26	4	6.50
3	Ben O'Carroll	St Brigid's	1-20	23	5	4.60
4	Darragh Kirwin	Naas	1-14	17	3	5.67
5	Shane Dempsey	St Loman's	1-11	14	3	4.67
5	Emmett Bradley	Glen	0-14	14	5	2.80
7	John Heslin	St Loman's	0-12	12	3	4
7	Bobby Nugent	St Brigid's	0-12	12	5	2.4
9	Paul Mannion	Kilmacud Crokes	0-11	11	4	2.75
10	Eoghan Frayne	Summerhill	0-10	10	2	5.00
10	Alex Beirne	Naas	0-10	10	3	3.33
10	Danny Tallon	Glen	0-10	10	5	2.00

In a single game

Rank	Player	Club	Tally	Total	Opposition
1	Shane Walsh	Kilmacud Crokes	1-08	11	Naas
2	Darragh Kirwan	Naas	1-07	10	St Loman's
2	Ben O'Carroll	St Brigid's	1-07	10	Corofin
4	Brian Hurley	Castlehaven	1-06	9	Rathgormack
5	Eoghan O'Flaherty	St Joseph's	0-07	7	Éire Óg
5	Brian Hurley	Castlehaven	0-07	7	St Brigid's
7	Tom Jackson	St Mary's	2-00	6	Blessington
7	Ben O'Carroll	St Brigid's	0-06	6	Coolera–Strandhill
7	Adam McCarron	Éire Óg	0-06	6	St Joseph's
7	Eoghan Frayne	Summerhill	0-06	6	Naas

=== Miscellaneous ===
- Kilmacud Crokes became the first team to win three successive Leinster Club SFC titles.
- Dingle qualified for the Munster Club SFC final for the first time.

== Awards ==
Team of the Year

1. Rory Beggan (Scotstown)
2. Ryan Dougan (Glen)
3. Brian Stack (St Brigid's)
4. Pearse Frost (St Brigid's)
5. Ruaidhrí Fallon (St Brigid's)
6. Ciarán McFaul (Glen)
7. Michael Warnock (Glen)
8. Conor Glass (Glen)
9. Emmett Bradley (Glen)
10. Eunan Mulholland (Glen)
11. Paul Mannion (Kilmacud Crokes)
12. Shane Walsh (Kilmacud Crokes)
13. Ben O'Carroll (St Brigid's)
14. Darragh Kirwan (Naas)
15. Brian Hurley (Castlehaven)

Beggan and Kirwan's clubs did not win their provincial championship.

Footballer of the Year

- Conor Glass (Glen)

Also nominated: Ben O'Carroll (St Brigid's) & Shane Walsh (Kilmacud Crokes)
