= Bernard Power =

Irish Gaelic footballer

Bernard Power is an Irish Gaelic footballer who plays for Corofin and the Galway county team. The goalkeeper during Corofin's run of three consecutive All-Ireland Club SFC titles from 2018 until 2020, Power received recognition from the AIB GAA Club Player Awards for his performances during the second and third of those competitions.

Power scored a '45 for Galway against Roscommon in the 2016 Connacht Senior Football Championship final as his team won a first title for eight years. He was still involved during the 2019 All-Ireland Senior Football Championship. Power was Galway's goalkeeper in the 2019 Connacht SFC game against Sligo, and also in the 2019 All-Ireland SFC game against Mayo, which Galway lost, therefore exiting the championship. He played a league game for the first time since 2021 against Kerry in the 2023 National League.
