= Kieran Fitzgerald (Gaelic footballer) =

Galway Gaelic footballer

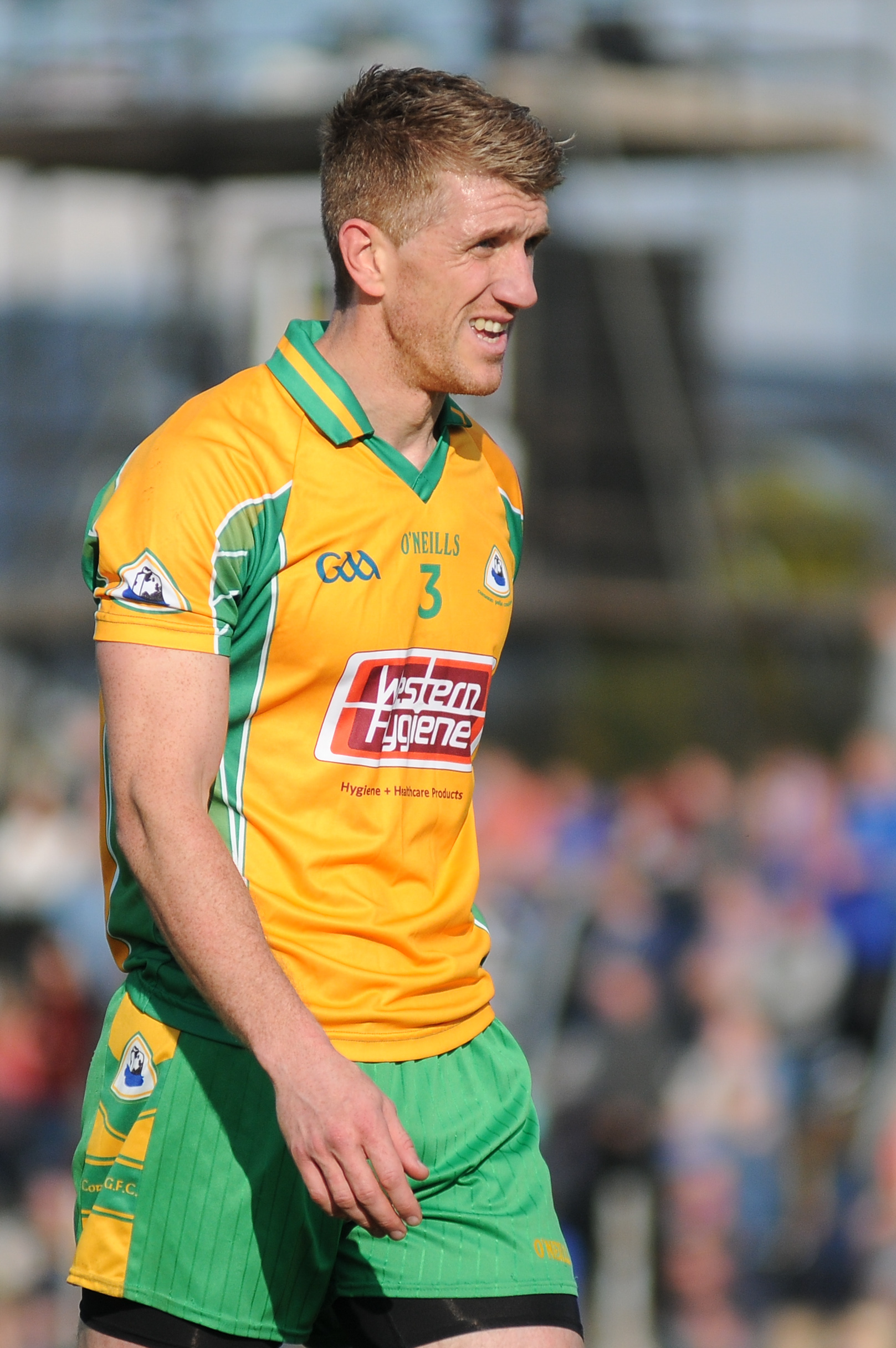
- Kieran Fitzgerald in 2015

Personal information
- Native name: Ciarán Mac Gearailt (Irish)
- Born: 1 January 1981 (age 45) Galway, Ireland
- Occupation: Garda Síochána
- Height: 1.88 m (6 ft 2 in)

Sport
- Sport: Gaelic football
- Position: Right corner-back
Club
- Years: Club
- 1998–2020: Corofin
Club titles
- Galway titles: 14
- Connacht titles: 7
- All-Ireland Titles: 4
Inter-county
- Years: County
- 2001–2011: Galway
Inter-county titles
- Connacht titles: 3
- All-Irelands: 1
- NFL: 0
- All Stars: 1

Kieran Fitzgerald (born 1 January 1981) is an Irish former Gaelic footballer who played for Corofin between 1998 and 2020 and for the Galway county team between 2000 and 2011.

== Career ==
Fitzgerald won an All-Ireland Senior Football Championship medal in 2001. That year he also received an All Star He was named Galway captain in 2007, and made his International Rules Series debut in 2006.

== Personal life ==
Fitzgerald dated Mairéad Meehan, a sister of the Galway inter-county footballers Declan, Michael, Noel and Tomás Meehan. They had met after the 2001 National Football League final, but Mairéad Meehan died of osteosarcoma at the age of 25 in late January 2007. He later met his wife Emer (née Flaherty). Fitzgerald was the subject of a Laochra Gael episode, which aired in February 2022.

== Honours ==
=== Club ===
- All-Ireland Senior Club Football Championship (4): 2015, 2018, 2019, 2020
- Connacht Senior Club Football Championship (7): 2008, 2009, 2014, 2016, 2017, 2018, 2019
- Galway Senior Football Championship (14): 1998, 2000, 2002, 2006, 2008, 2009, 2011, 2013, 2014, 2015, 2016, 2017, 2018, 2019

=== County ===
- All-Ireland Senior Football Championship (1): 2001
- Connacht Senior Football Championship (4): 2002, 2003, 2005, 2008
- All-Ireland Under-21 Football Championship (1): 2002
- Connacht Under-21 Football Championship (2): 2000, 2002

=== Individual ===
- All Star Award (1): 2001
- Club Football Team of the Year (2): 2018, 2020
