= Ronan Steede =

Irish Gaelic footballer

Ronan Steede (born 1991/1992) is an Irish Gaelic footballer who plays for Corofin and the Galway county team.

A player during Corofin's run of three consecutive All-Ireland Club SFC titles from 2018 until 2020, Steede received recognition from the AIB GAA Club Player Awards for his performances during the third of those competitions when he was selected for inclusion on the Team of the Year and, later, chosen as Footballer of the Year.

Galway manager Pádraic Joyce gave Steede, then aged 28, his first senior inter-county appearance around that time.
