= Ruaidhrí Fallon =

Irish Gaelic footballer

Ruaidhrí Fallon (born 2002/2003) is an Irish Gaelic footballer who plays for St Brigid's, as well as the Roscommon county team. He is a defender.

Fallon first came to prominence at the age of 17 during his involvement in his club's 2020 Roscommon Senior Football Championship title victory. He was sent off while playing for Roscommon at Croke Park in the 2024 All-Ireland Senior Football Championship quarter-final against eventual title winner Armagh, which was described in coverage of the incident as "a major talking point" that "would ultimately prove decisive". Fallon played for St Brigid's in the 2023–24 All-Ireland Senior Club Football Championship final. He was selected for inclusion on the 2024 AIB GAA Club Team of the Year. With a background in rugby, Fallon has also represented Connacht's Gaelic football team at inter-provincial level.
