= Kevin O'Donovan (Gaelic footballer) =

Irish Gaelic footballer

Personal information
- Native name: Caoimhín Ó Donnabháin (Irish)
- Born: 1998 (age 27–28) Cork, Ireland
- Occupation: Student

Sport
- Sport: Gaelic Football
- Position: Right wing-back
Club
- Years: Club
- Nemo Rangers
Club titles
- Cork titles: 2
- Munster titles: 2
- All-Ireland Titles: 0
Inter-county
- Years: County
- 2019-present: Cork
Inter-county titles
- Munster titles: 0
- All-Irelands: 0
- NFL: 0
- All Stars: 0

Kevin O'Donovan (born 1998) is an Irish Gaelic footballer who plays for Premier Senior Championship club Nemo Rangers and at inter-county level with the Cork senior football team. He usually lines out as a right wing-back.

== Honours ==
Nemo Rangers

- Munster Senior Club Football Championship (2): 2017, 2019
- Cork Senior Football Championship (2): 2017, 2019

Cork

- National Football League Division 3 (1): 2020
