= 2014–15 All-Ireland Senior Club Football Championship =

Irish Football Championship

- Dates: 19 October 2014 – 17 March 2015
- Teams: 30
- Sponsor: Allied Irish Bank
- Champions: Corofin (2nd title); Michael Farragher (captain); Stephen Rochford (manager)
- Runners-up: Slaughtneil; Francis McEldowney (captain); Mickey Moran (manager)

Tournament statistics
- Matches played: 29
- Top scorer(s): Tomás Quinn (5-10); Gary Sice (1-22)

The 2014–15 All-Ireland Senior Club Football Championship was the 45th annual Gaelic football tournament since its establishment in 1970.

Corofin won the title after a 1–14 to 0–7 win against Slaughtneil in the final on 17 March 2015.

== Connacht ==
=== Quarter-final ===
26 October 2014 Quarter-final	Tubbercurry	0-13 - 2-12	Aughawillan	Markievicz Park
	S Matthews (0-4, 2f), C McGee (0-3, 1f), C Killoran (0-2), S Kilcoyne (0-2, 1f), D Kelly (0-1), D Brennan (0-1).	Report	C Gilheany (1-7, 2f), R McTague (1-0), S Fox (0-2), S Gilheany (0-1), G Plunkett (0-1), P Dolan (0-1).

=== Semi-finals ===
9 November 2014 Semi-final	Ballintubber	3-10 - 1-13	St Brigid's	McHale Park
	C O'Connor 1-3 (1f), P O'Connor (1 '45), A Plunkett 1-2 each, A Dillon (1f) 0-2, S Broderick 0-1.	Report	F Dolan 0-6 (3fs), S Kilbride 0-4 (4fs), K Mannion 1-1, P Mulvihill, A Gleeson 0-1 each.

9 November 2014 Semi-final	Aughawillan	0-06 - 7-20	Corofin	Páirc Seán Mac Diarmada
	C Gilheany 0-4 (2fs), S Flanagan, M Plunkett 0-1 each.	Report	M Lundy 3-1, M Farragher 2-1, I Burke 1-2, J Canney 1-1, G Sice 0-6 (2fs), D Wall, R Steede 0-3 each, G, Higgins, A O'Donovan, B O'Donovan 0-1 each.

=== Final ===
23 November 2014 Final	Ballintubber	1-07 - 2-13	Corofin	McHale Park
	C O’Connor (0-6,5fs), A Dillon (1-1).	Report	I Burke (1-5, 1f), G Sice (1-2), K Fitzgerald (0-1), R Steede (0-1); Mike Farragher (0-1), G Delaney (0-1); Martin Farragher (0-1), M Lundy (0-1).

== Leinster ==
=== First round ===
26 October 2014 First round	Rhode	2-09 - 0-10	St Patrick's	O'Connor Park
	N McNamee (0-6, 5f), A Sullivan (1-1), C McNamee (1-0); N Darby (0-2, 1f).	Report	P Keenan (0-5, 1f), K White (0-3, 2f), D O'Connor (0-1), E O'Connor (0-1).

26 October 2014 First round	Rathnew	1-13 - 1-09	Rathvilly	Aughrim County Ground
	T Gill (0-5f), E Doyle (0-4f), J Merrigan (1-0), T Smith (0-1f), G Merrigan (0-1); J Stafford (0-1), P Murphy (0-1).	Report	G Dempsey (0-5, 3f), K Doyle (1-0), JJ Smith (0-2), Brian Murphy (0-1f); A Kelly (0-1).

2 November 2014 First round	Portlaoise	w/o - scr.	St Anne's Rathangan	Wexford Park

=== Quarter-finals ===
9 November 2014 Quarter-final	Rhode	4-10 - 0-13	Navan O'Mahony's	O'Connor Park
	G O’Connell (2-01, 1-00 pen); N McNamee (1-04, 0-01 free), A Sullivan (0-04), B Darby (1-00), C McNamee (0-01).	Report	J Regan (0-05, 0-03 frees), S Bray (0-03, 0-01 free), A Forde (0-02); S Crosby (0-02), S Gillespie (0-01).

9 November 2014 Quarter-final	Rathnew	2-07 - 0-17	Moorefield	Aughrim County Ground
	P Murphy (1-0), J Merrigan (1-0), T Gill (0-3), E Doyle (0-2), R O'Brien (0-1), L Glynn (0-1).		E O'Connor (0-8), A Tyrrell (0-3), C Kelly (0-1), E Heavey (0-1); C O'Connor (0-1); R Sweeney (0-1), N Hurley Lynch (0-1), D Flynn (0-1).

9 November 2014 Quarter-final	Portlaoise	0-10 - 3-11	St Vincent's	O'Moore Park
	P Cahillane (0-06, 4f), C Rogers (0-02, 1f), B McCormack (0-01), Z Tuohy (0-01).	Report	S Carthy (2-02), T Quinn (1-03, 2f), Cormac Diamond (0-02), R Treanor (0-02), D Connolly (0-02, 1f).

9 November 2014 Quarter-final	Garrycastle	1-11 - 1-10	Killoe Young Emmets	Cusack Park
	D Dolan (0-5, 2f), M McCallion (1-0), M Monaghan (0-2, 1f), G McCallion (0-1); C Cosgrove (0-1), J Duignan (0-1), J Dolan (0-1).	Report	D McGoldrick (0-4, 3f), P Thompson (1-0), R McGoldrick (0-2), M Quinn (0-2); L Moran (0-1), S McCormack (0-1f),

=== Semi-finals ===
23 November 2014 Semi-final	Rhode	1-15 - 2-04	Moorefield	O'Connor Park
	N McNamee 0-7 (3f), A Sullivan 1-2, N Darby 0-3 (3fs), P McPadden, S Hannon, R McNamee 0-1 each.	Report	A Tyrrell 1-1, R Sweeney 1-0 (pen), C Kelly, N Hurley-Lynch, E O’Connor (f) 0-1 each.

23 November 2014 Semi-final	St Vincent's	3-09 - 1-10	Garrycastle	Parnell Park
	T Quinn 2-2 (1-0 pen, 0-1f), S Carthy 1-1, G Burke, D Connolly (0-1f), G Brennan 0-2 each.	Report	D Dolan 1-5 (0-3f), J Dolan 0-2, J Barrett, M Guiheen, M Monaghan 0-1 each.

=== Final ===
14 December 2014 Final	Rhode	0-06 - 1-13	St Vincent's	Páirc Tailteann
	N Darby, (1f), N McNamee (1f) 0-2 each, A Sullivan, C McNamee 0-1 each.	Report	T Quinn 1-4 (0-2fs), G Burke, Cormac Diamond 0-2 each, B Egan, C Dorney, R Trainor, S Carthy, D Connolly all 0-1 each.

== Munster ==
=== Quarter-finals ===
2 November 2014 Quarter-final	Ballylanders	0-07 - 1-11	The Nire	Gaelic Grounds
	J Barry-Murphy 0-4 (two frees), D Frewen 0-2 (one free), M O’Connell 0-1.	Report	C Gleeson 1-2, S Ryan (one free), J Barron 0-2 each, D Wall, B Wall, C Guiry, S Walsh, M Moore 0-1 each.

2 November 2014 Quarter-final	Austin Stacks	w/o - scr.	Loughmore-Castleiney	Semple Stadium

=== Semi-finals ===
16 November 2014 Semi-final	The Nire	1-13 - 2-08	Cratloe	Fraher Field
	C Gleeson 1-2; J Barron, S Walsh, S Ryan (2fs) 0-3 each; B Wall 0-2	Report	C McInerney 1-6 (4fs); C Ryan 1-0; P Collins 0-2.

16 November 2014 Semi-final	Austin Stacks	0-15 - 1-09 (aet)	Ballincollig	Austin Stack Park
	S Carroll 0-3 (3f), D Mannix 0-3, G Horan 0-2, P McCarthy 0-2, Darragh Long 0-2 (2f), S O’Callaghan 0-1, D McElligott 0-1, K Donaghy 0-1	Report	P Kelly 1-0, C Dorgan 0-3 (1 ’45’, 1f), J Miskella 0-3, C Kiely 0-1, J Kelly 0-1, S Kiely 0-1

=== Final ===
30 November 2014 Final	The Nire	2-04 - 3-05	Austin Stacks	Páirc Uí Rinn
	S Ryan (1-1, one free); M Moore (1-0), B Wall (free), M O’Gorman, C. Gleeson (0-1 each).	Report	D Mannix (1-2, two frees); S O’Callaghan (1-1); P McCarthy (1-0, pen); M Collins, F Mangan (0-1 each).

== Ulster ==
=== Preliminary round ===
19 October 2014 Quarter-final	Kilcoo	0-11 - 1-09	Clontibret O'Neills	Pairc Esler
	D O'Hanlon 0-4 (3f), C Laverty 0-2, J Johnston 0-2, P Devlin 0-1 (f), R Johnston 0-1, D Kane 0-1.	Report	C McManus 0-8 (8f), D Mone 1-0, V Corey 0-1.

=== Quarter-finals ===
2 November 2014 Quarter-final	Omagh St Enda's	2-08 - 1-09	Crossmaglen Rangers	Healy Park
	R O'Neill 1-4 (0-1f), B Tierney 1-0, C Grugan 0-2 (1f), C O'Donnell, J McAnulla 0-1 each.	Report	P Stuttard 1-0, T Kernan 0-3 (3f), K Brennan, J Clarke (1f) 0-2 each, M Aherne, J Murtagh 0-1 each.

2 November 2014 Quarter-final	Clontibret O'Neills	0-10 - 0-09	St Gall's	St Tiernach's Park
	C McManus 0-7 (5fs), V Corey, B Greenan, A Curran 0-1 each.	Report	M Pollock 0-4 (1f), C McGourty 0-2fs, J McGreavey, T O'Neill, A Gallagher 0-1 each.

9 November 2014 Quarter-final	St Eunan's	1-09 - 0-06	Roslea Shamrocks	MacCumhaill Park
	C Dunne 1-4 (1-0 pen, 2fs), K Rafferty 0-2, C Parke, R Carr 0-1 each.	Report	Seamus Quigley 0-4 (3f), Sean Quigley (f), D Reilly 0-1 each.

9 November 2014 Quarter-final	Slaughtneil	0-11 - 0-10	Cavan Gaels	Owenbeg
	P Bradley 0-5 (3f), C Bradley 0-3, R Bradley, G Bradley, S McGuigan 0-1 each.	Report	S Johnston 0-6 (5f), D Meehan 0-1 (f), N Murray, P Graham 0-1 each.

=== Semi-finals ===
16 November 2014 Semi-final	St Eunan's	0-08 - 1-08	Omagh St Enda's	Celtic Park
	Cillian Morrison (0-2), Conor Morrison (0-1); R Kavanagh (0-1); C Gibbons (0-1), C Dunne (0-1, free), S McVeigh (0-1); R Carr (0-1, free).		B Tierney (1-0), C McMahon (0-3); R O’Neill (0-3), C O’Donnell (0-1), J McAnulla (0-1).

16 November 2014 Semi-final	Slaughtneil	1-09 - 0-07	Clontibret O'Neills	Healy Park
	Paul Bradley (0-6, 3 frees), C Bradley (1-1), R Bradley (0-1), C O’Doherty (0-1).		C McManus (0-6, 0-5 frees), F Greenan (0-1).

=== Final ===
30 November 2014 Final	Omagh St Enda's	1-09 - 1-10	Slaughtneil	Athletic Grounds
	B Tierney 1-1, R O'Neill (2f), C O'Neill 0-2 each, H Gallagher, Joe McMahon, A Grugan, C O'Neill 0-1 each.	Report	C O'Doherty 1-2, C Bradley 0-4, G Bradley, R Bradley, Paul Bradley (1f), B McGuigan 0-1 each.

== Quarter-final ==
14 December 2014 Quarter-final	Tír Chonaill Gaels	0-02 - 0-09	Corofin	Emerald GAA Grounds
	C O’Neill, E O’Neill (f) 0-1 each.	Report	G Sice 0-6 (4f), Martin Farragher, Michael Farragher, D Burke 0-1 each.

== Semi-finals ==
14 February 2015 Semi Final	Corofin	1-14 - 1-9	St Vincent's	O'Connor Park
	I Burke 0-5 (1f); M Farragher 1-2; M Lundy 0-4, G Sice 0-3(f)	Report	T Quinn 1-1 (1-0 pen, 1f); D Connolly 0-3 (1f); R Treanor 0-2; C Dorney, B Egan, SB Carthy 0-1 each.	Attendance: 4,188; Referee: P Hughes (Armagh)

15 February 2015 Semi Final	Slaughtneil	1-14 - 2-10	Austin Stacks	O'Moore Park
16:00	B McGuigan 1-1, P Bradley 0-4 (0-4f), C Bradley 0-3, G Bradley, C O’Doherty, C McKaigue, P Bradley, P Kelly 0-1 each.	Report	P McCarthy 2-1 (1-0 pen), S Carroll 0-3 (0-2f), D Mannix 0-2 (0-1f), S O’Callaghan, G Horan, K Donaghy 0-1 each.	Referee: David Gough (Meath)

== Final ==
17 March 2015 Final	Corofin	1-14 - 0-07	Slaughtneil	Croke Park
16:00	G Sice 0-5 (4fs), M Lundy 0-3, M Farragher 1-0, M Farragher, G Delaney, L Silke (f), R Steede, I Burke, J Canney 0-1 each.	Report	G Bradley 0-3, C Bradley (f), C McKaigue, P Bradley (f), P Kelly (f) 0-1 each.	Attendance: 29,752; Referee: David Coldrick (Meath)

== Statistics ==
=== Top scorers ===
Overall

Rank	Player	Club	Tally	Total	Matches	Average
1	Tomás Quinn	St Vincent's	5-10	25	4	6.25
1	Gary Sice	Corofin	1-22	25	5	5.00
2	Niall McNamee	Rhode	1-19	22	4	5.50
3	Conor McManus	Clontibret O'Neills	0-21	21	3	7.00
4	Ian Burke	Corofin	2-13	19	3	7.00
5	Micheál Lundy	Corofin	3-09	18	5	3.40
6	Paul Bradley	SLaughtneil	0-17	17	5	3.40
7	Christopher Bradley	SLaughtneil	1-12	15	5	3.00
8	Ciaran Gilheany	Aughawillan	1-11	14	2	7.00
9	Shane Carthy	St Vincent's	3-05	14	4	3.50

In a single game

Rank	Player	Club	Tally	Total	Opposition
1	Micheál Lundy	Corofin	1-07	10	Aughawillan
1	Ciaran Gilheany	Aughawillan	1-07	10	Tubbercurry
2	Cathal McInerney	Cratloe	1-06	9	The Nire
3	Shane Carthy	St Vincent's	2-02	8	Portlaoise
3	Tomás Quinn	St Vincent's	2-02	8	Garrycastle
3	Dessie Dolan	Garrycastle	1-05	8	St Vincent's
3	Ian Burke	Corofin	1-05	8	Ballintibber
3	Conor McManus	Clontibret O'Neills	0-08	8	Kilcoo
3	Éanna O'Connor	Moorefield	0-08	8	Rathnew
4	Glenn O'Connell	Rhode	2-01	7	Navan O'Mahony's
4	Michael Farragher	Corofin	2-01	7	Aughawillan
4	Pa McCarthy	Austin Stacks	2-01	7	Slaughtneil
4	Ronan O'Neill	Omagh St Enda's	1-04	7	Crossmaglen Rangers
4	Conall Dunne	St Eunan's	1-04	7	Roslea Shamrocks
4	Tomás Quinn	St Vincent's	1-04	7	Rhode
4	Niall McNamee	Rhode	0-07	7	Moorefield
4	Conor McManus	Clontibret O'Neills	0-07	7	St Gall's

=== Miscellaneous ===
- The Wexford SFC champions St Anne's Rathangan did not compete in this year's championship as the Wexford Senior Championship had not reached completion by the date of their Leinster SCFC preliminary round tie. Hence, Portlaoise were granted a walkover.
