= Martin Farragher =

Irish Gaelic footballer

Martin Farragher is an Irish Gaelic footballer who plays for Corofin and the Galway county team. He received recognition from the AIB GAA Club Player Awards in each of Corofin's run of three consecutive All-Ireland Club SFC titles from 2018 until 2020. He was "man of the match" in the first of those finals, having been sent off after two minutes in the semi-final.

A forward, Farragher first played senior inter-county football for Galway in 2019. He was involved as a player in the 2019 Connacht Senior Football Championship final, having scored a goal against Sligo in the semi-final.

Farragher's brother Michael also plays for Corofin and Galway.
