= Brian Stack (Gaelic footballer) =

Irish Gaelic footballer

Brian Stack (born 1997/1998) is an Irish Gaelic footballer who plays for St Brigid's and the Roscommon county team. He plays mostly in defence, although he has also played as a forward.

Stack's brother Ronan has also played for Roscommon and was part of the St Brigid's team that won the 2012–13 All-Ireland Senior Club Football Championship title. He attended Marist College, Athlone, where he was part of the team that played in the Leinster Colleges Senior Football Championship final of 2014.

Stack made his club debut in 2014. He played for St Brigid's in the 2023–24 All-Ireland Senior Club Football Championship final.

Stack first played inter-county football for Roscommon in 2017. He marked his debut inter-county season with a Connacht SFC title, and added a second in 2019.

He has captained Roscommon for several seasons. He has also represented Connacht at inter-provincial level.

== Honours ==
- Connacht Senior Football Championship (2): 2017, 2019
- Connacht Senior Club Football Championship: 2023
- AIB GAA Club Team of the Year: 2024
