= Ben O'Carroll =

Irish Gaelic footballer

Ben O'Carroll (born 2001/2002) is an Irish Gaelic footballer who plays as a forward for St Brigid's and the Roscommon county team. He has also played Sigerson Cup football.

O'Carroll is a native of Hodson Bay, near Athlone. With the Roscommon under-20s, he won the 2021 Connacht Under-20 Football Championship, and then played in the 2021 All-Ireland Under-20 Football Championship final. He made his senior debut for Roscommon in the 2023 National Football League, scoring 1–2 in a victory over Tyrone and collecting the "man of the match" award afterwards. By 2024, he was expected to begin any Roscommon game. However, injury limited his playing time for Roscommon, as well as his playing time for St Brigid's in the Roscommon Senior Football Championship, and he had hip surgery towards the end of the year.

With his club, O'Carroll was "man of the match" in Corofin's 2023 Connacht Senior Club Football Championship final loss to St Brigid's. He received recognition from the AIB GAA Club Player Awards when he was selected for inclusion on its Team of the Year, and was nominated for Player of the Year, alongside Shane Walsh and eventual winner Conor Glass. He also plays alongside his younger brother, Charlie.
