= Michael Farragher =

Irish Gaelic footballer

Michael Farragher is an Irish Gaelic footballer who plays for Corofin and the Galway county team.

He captained Corofin to the club's second All-Ireland Senior Club Football Championship title in 2015. He also had central roles in Corofin's run of three consecutive All-Ireland Club SFC titles from 2018 until 2020, scoring a goal in the first final to help his team to its third title, before being sent off in the third final when the club claimed its fifth title.

In 2010, he was based in Melbourne, where he played Australian rules football for Grovedale, and he also visited the Gold Coast. In 2011, he won an All-Ireland Under-21 Football Championship with Galway. He played for the Galway senior team during Kevin Walsh's time as manager, and maintained his presence when Pádraic Joyce succeeded Walsh. In 2019, he played for the McBride's club in Chicago, before returning to Corofin.

Farragher's brother Martin also plays for Corofin and Galway. Both Farraghers are forwards.
