= 2020 Roscommon Senior Football Championship =

Roscommon S.F.C.
- Season: 2020
- Champions: ???
- Relegated: ???
- All Ireland SCFC: ???
- Connacht SCFC: ???

The 2020 Roscommon Senior Football Championship was the 120th edition of the Roscommon GAA's premier club Gaelic football tournament for senior clubs in County Roscommon, Ireland. 12 teams competed, with the winner representing Roscommon in the Connacht Senior Club Football Championship. The championship started with a group stage and then progressed to a knock out stage.

Padraig Pearses were the defending champions after they defeated Roscommon Gaels in the 2019 final to claim a first S.F.C. crown.

This was Tulsk Lord Edward's return to the top flight of Roscommon football after claiming the 2019 I.F.C. title.

Future Roscommon inter-county player Ruaidhrí Fallon first came to prominence at the age of 17 during his involvement in his club's title victory in this competition.

== Team changes ==
The following teams changed division since the 2019 championship season.

=== To S.F.C. ===
Promoted from I.F.C.

- St Faithleach's - (Intermediate Champions)

=== From S.F.C. ===
Relegated to I.F.C.

- Tulsk Lord Edward's

== Group stage ==
There were three groups of four teams called Group A, B and C. The 1st and 2nd placed teams in Groups A, B and C automatically qualified for the quarter-finals. One third placed team from one of the three groups received a bye into the quarter-finals in an open draw. The remaining two 3rd placed teams met in a Quarter-Final Play-Off to determine the team that completed the quarter-finals lineup. The 4th placed teams proceeded to the Relegation Play-Off to determine which team would suffer relegation.

Each team had home advantage in one round, played away in another before a neutral venue was for another round.

=== Group A ===
Team	Pld	W	L	D	PF	PA	PD	Pts
Clann na nGael	3	2	0	1	45	34	+11	5
St Brigid's	3	2	0	1	57	42	+15	5
Elphin	3	1	2	0	35	47	-12	2
Strokestown	3	0	3	0	29	43	-14	0

Round 1

- Elphin 1-9, 0-10 Strokestown, 25/7/2020,
- St Brigid's 1-14, 1-14 Clann na nGael, 25/7/2020,

Round 2

- Strokestown 1-7, 0-14 St Brigid's, 31/7/2020,
- Elphin 0-8, 0-11 Clann na nGael, 1/8/2020,

Round 3

- Clann na nGael 0-17, 1-6 Strokestown, 15/8/2020,
- St Brigid's 3-17, 1-12 Elphin, 15/8/2020,

=== Group B ===
Team	Pld	W	L	D	PF	PA	PD	Pts
Western Gaels	3	3	0	0	60	30	+30	6
Roscommon Gaels	3	2	1	0	43	35	+8	4
St Croan's	3	1	2	0	33	56	-23	2
Fuerty	3	0	3	0	29	44	-15	0

Round 1

- Roscommon Gaels 0-7, 0-10 Western Gaels, 25/7/2020,
- Fuerty 0-6, 0-8 St Croan's, 25/7/2020,

Round 2

- St Croan's 0-12, 1-15 Roscommon Gaels, 1/8/2020,
- Western Gaels 0-18, 0-10 Fuerty, 2/8/2020,

Round 3

- Roscommon Gaels 2-12, 0-13 Fuerty, 16/8/2020,
- Western Gaels 4-20, 1-10 St Croan's, 16/8/2020,

=== Group C ===
Team	Pld	W	L	D	PF	PA	PD	Pts
Boyle	3	2	0	1	47	35	+12	5
Pádraig Pearse's	3	1	1	1	43	41	+2	3
Michael Glavey's	3	1	2	0	35	42	-7	2
Tulsk Lord Edward's	3	1	2	0	36	43	-7	2

Round 1

- Michael Glavey's 2-11, 1-7 Tulsk, 25/7/2020,
- Pádraig Pearse's 2-10, 3-7 Boyle, 26/7/2020,

Round 2

- Boyle 1-10, 1-9 Tulsk, 1/8/2020,
- Michael Glavey's 1-8, 0-14 Pádraig Pearse's, 2/8/2020,

Round 3

- Tulsk 1-11, 1-10 Pádraig Pearse's, 15/8/2020,
- Boyle 1-15, 0-7 Michael Glavey's, 15/8/2020,

== Knock-Out Stage ==
=== Preliminary Quarter-Final ===
One third placed team from one of the three groups received a bye into the quarter-finals in an open draw (St Croan's). The remaining two 3rd placed teams met in a Quarter-Final Play-Off to determine the team that completed the quarter-finals lineup.

23 August 2020 Quarter-Final Play-Off	Michael Glaveys	v	Elphin	Boyle
16:00 IST (UTC+1)

=== Quarter-finals ===
The 1st placed teams in Groups A, B and C along with the 2nd placed team with the best record were seeded for the quarter-final draw and could not meet each other in the quarter-finals. The remaining 2nd and 3rd placed tams in the quarter-finals were unseeded. No pairing which is a repeat of a group stage fixture could occur in the quarter-finals.

1 September 2020 Quarter-Final	???	v	???	Roscommon
??? IST (UTC+1)				Venue: Dr Hyde Park

1 September 2020 Quarter-Final	???	v	???	Roscommon
??? IST (UTC+1)				Venue: Dr Hyde Park

1 September 2020 Quarter-Final	???	v	???	Roscommon
??? IST (UTC+1)				Venue: Dr Hyde Park

1 September 2020 Quarter-Final	???	v	???	Roscommon
??? IST (UTC+1)				Venue: Dr Hyde Park

=== Semi-finals ===
1 September 2020 Semi-Final	???	v	???	Roscommon
??? IST (UTC+1)				Venue: Dr Hyde Park

1 September 2020 Semi-Final	???	v	???	Roscommon
??? IST (UTC+1)				Venue: Dr Hyde Park

=== Final ===
1 September 2020 Final	???	v	???	Roscommon
??? IST (UTC+1)				Venue: Dr Hyde Park

== Relegation play-off ==
The Relegation Play-Off consisted of the 4th placed finishers in Groups A, B and C. The two teams with the best group record played in the Relegation Semi-Final. The loser of this semi-final had to play-off with the remaining team in the Relegation Final. The winner of the semi-final and Final retained their senior status for 2021, while the loser of the Relegation Final had to ply their trade in the I.F.C. for 2021.

29 August 2020 Relegation Semi-Final	Strokestown	v	Fuerty	???
18:00 IST (UTC+1)

5 September 2020 Relegation Final	Tulsk Lord Edwards	v	???	???
18:00 IST (UTC+1)				Venue: ???
