= Conor Glass =

Gaelic and former Australian rules footballer

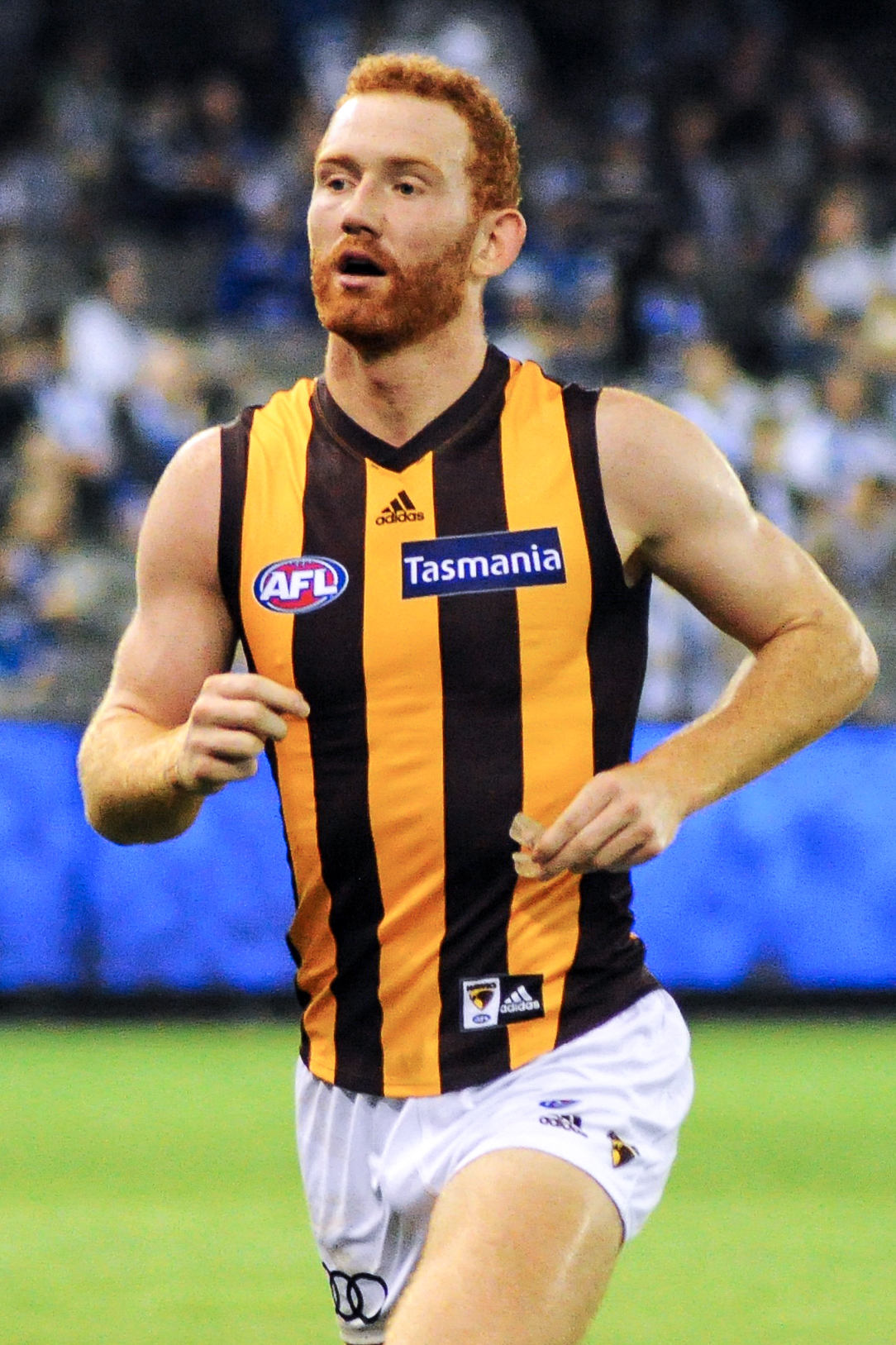
- Glass playing for Hawthorn in April 2018
- Born: 28 September 1997 (age 29)
Australian rules football career
Personal information
- Original teams: Glen (club); Derry (county)
- Draft: No. 62, 2016 rookie draft
- Debut: Round 18, 2017, Hawthorn vs. Fremantle, at Domain Stadium
- Height: 189 cm (6 ft 2 in)
- Weight: 84 kg (185 lb)
- Position: Midfielder
Club information
- Current club: Hawthorn
- Number: 13
Playing career^{1}
Years	Club	Games (Goals)
2016– 2020	Hawthorn	21 (2)
- ^{1} Playing statistics correct to the end of 2020.
Career highlights
- VFL premiership player: 2018

Conor Glass (born 28 September 1997) is a Gaelic footballer and former professional Australian rules footballer who played for the Hawthorn Football Club in the Australian Football League (AFL). He signed with Hawthorn as a category B rookie in October 2015 and was subsequently drafted with their fourth selection and sixty-second overall in the 2016 rookie draft. He retired at the end of the 2020 season and returned to Ireland.

== Sporting career ==
Glass captained the Derry minors side in the All-Ireland semi-finals. Glass was recruited by Hawthorn as a class B rookie in 2015. Arriving in Australia in July 2016, Glass played 6 games for the Box Hill development squad that included the squad's victorious grand final team. After a full summer pre-season training regime, Glass had played 12 games in the Box Hill's senior team before getting a call up for the Hawthorn team.

=== AFL career ===
Glass made his debut for Hawthorn in their 52-point win against Fremantle at Domain Stadium in round eighteen of the 2017 season. Glass was widely seen as performing well in his debut. Glass performed well throughout the rest of the season, and on August 2, 2017, he signed a two-year rookie/player contract extension to stay on Hawthorn's rookie list until the end of 2018.

Glass played only four senior games in 2018, but despite this was seen as having improved his skills during the year.

Glass was elevated to the senior list in 2019. Glass kicked his first goal during the 2019 season, during Hawthorn's round 13 loss to Essendon.

Glass played four games in 2020 and decided to return to Ireland at season's end.

=== GAA career ===
Glass made his debut for Derry against Longford in the 2020 National Football League, a fixture delayed by many months due to the pandemic.

During the first half of the 2022 All-Ireland Senior Football Championship semi-final game against Galway, a Glass effort at scoring a point was ruled wide by Hawk-Eye. That decision came under scrutiny when Hawk-Eye was shown to have malfunctioned later in the game by overturning an umpire decision's to award a point to Galway player Shane Walsh. He won an All Star at the end of the season.

On 21 January 2024, Glass scored 1-2 as Glen won the 2023–24 All-Ireland Senior Club Football Championship for the first time after a 2-10 to 1-12 win against St Brigid's in the final at Croke Park.

== Statistics ==
Legend
G	Goals	K	Kicks	D	Disposals	T	Tackles
B	Behinds	H	Handballs	M	Marks

Season	Team	No.	Games	Totals							Averages (per game)							Votes
Season	Team	No.	Games	G	B	K	H	D	M	T	G	B	K	H	D	M	T	Votes
2016	Hawthorn	44	0	—	—	—	—	—	—	—	—	—	—	—	—	—	—	0
2017	Hawthorn	44	6	0	0	45	31	76	20	17	0.0	0.0	7.5	5.2	12.7	3.3	2.8	0
2018	Hawthorn	44	4	0	0	31	17	48	11	13	0.0	0.0	7.8	4.3	12.0	2.8	3.3	0
2019	Hawthorn	13	7	1	1	57	38	95	25	10	0.1	0.1	8.1	5.4	13.6	3.6	1.4	0
2020 (Note: The 2020 season was played with 17 home-and-away matches per team (down from 22) and 16-minute quarters with time on (down from 20-minute quarters with time on) due to the impact of the COVID-19 pandemic.)	Hawthorn	13	4	1	0	26	16	42	13	10	0.3	0.0	6.5	4.0	10.5	3.3	2.4	0
Career			21	2	1	159	102	261	69	50	0.1	0.0	7.6	4.9	12.4	3.3	2.4	0

== Honours and achievements ==
Hawthorn

- VFL premiership player (Box Hill): 2018
- Hawthorn best first year player (debut season): 2017

Glen

- All Ireland Senior Club Football Championship: 1
  - 2024
- Ulster Senior Club Football Championship: 2
  - 2022, 2023
- Derry Senior Football Championship: 3
  - 2021, 2022, 2023
- AIB GAA Club Player of the Year: 2024
- AIB GAA Club Team of the Year: 2024

Derry

- National Football League (1): 2024
- Ulster Senior Football Championship (2): 2022, 2023
- All Star (1): 2022

Sporting positions
Preceded by Chrissy McKaigue	Derry Senior Football Captain; 2023–present	Succeeded by Incumbent
