= 2017–18 All-Ireland Senior Club Football Championship =

Irish Football Championship

- Dates: 15 October 2017 – 17 March 2018
- Sponsor: Allied Irish Bank
- Champions: Corofin (3rd title)
- Runners-up: Nemo Rangers

The 2017–18 All-Ireland Senior Club Football Championship was the 48th annual Gaelic football club championship since its establishment in the 1970–71 season. The winning team received the Andy Merrigan Cup.

The defending champion was Dr Crokes.

Corofin (Galway) won a third title, defeating Nemo Rangers (Cork) by 2–19 to 0–10 in the final on 17 March 2018.

== Format ==
County Championships

Ireland's 32 counties play their county championships between their senior gaelic football clubs. Each county decides the format for their county championship. The format can be straight knockout, double-elimination, a league, groups, etc. or a combination.

Only single club teams are allowed to enter the All-Ireland Club championship. If a team which is an amalgamation of two or more clubs or a university team wins a county's championship, a single club team will represent that county in the provincial championship as determined by that county's championship rules (normally it is the club team that exited the championship at the highest stage).

Provincial Championships

Connacht, Leinster, Munster and Ulster each organise a provincial championship for their participating county champions. All matches are knock-out and two ten minute periods of extra time are played if it's a draw at the end of normal time.

All-Ireland

Fulham Irish, the winners of the London club championship, played Corofin, the winners of the Galway provincial championship, in a single match on 21 January 2018. The game was played in London and was referred to as a quarter-final. This was the final year for this arrangement – from 2018 onwards, the London champions played in the Connacht senior club championship.

Two semi-finals were played on two Saturday's in mid-February. The All-Ireland Club SFC final was played at Croke Park 17 March (St Patrick's Day).

== County Finals ==
=== Connacht County Finals ===
Galway SFC

| 15 October 2017; 4:00 pm Final | Corofin | 2-14 - 0-10 | Mountbellew-Moylough | Tuam Stadium; Referee: Muiris Mac Gearailt (Micheal Breathnach); Man of the Match: Dylan Wall |
| 15 October 2017; 4:00 pm Final | Jason Leonard 0-6 (0-4f), Martin Farragher 1-1, Conor Cunningham 1-0, Ronan Steede 0-2 and Gary Sice (0-1f) 0-2 each, Michael Farragher, Dylan Wall, Ian Burke 0-1 each | Report | Barry McHugh 0-6 (0-4f), Paul Donnelan 0-2, Joe Bergin and Eoin Finnerty 0-1 each | Tuam Stadium; Referee: Muiris Mac Gearailt (Micheal Breathnach); Man of the Match: Dylan Wall |

Leitrim SFC

| 8 October 2017; 3:30 pm Final | Mohill | 0-14 - 0-11 | Glencar–Manorhamilton | Páirc Mac Diarmada, Carrick-on-S. Attendance: 3,000; Referee: Brendan Sammon (Aughnasheelin); Man of the Match: Keith Beirne |
| 8 October 2017; 3:30 pm Final | Keith Beirne 0-7 (0-3f, 1 '45), Ronan Kennedy 0-3 (0-1f), Danny Beck, Domhnaill Flynn, Keith Keegan, Alan McLoughlin 0-1 each | Report | Aaron Hickey 0-4 (0-2f), Niall Brady 0-3, Darren Sweeney, Brian McDonald, Adrian Croal, James Glancy 0-1 each | Páirc Mac Diarmada, Carrick-on-S. Attendance: 3,000; Referee: Brendan Sammon (Aughnasheelin); Man of the Match: Keith Beirne |

Mayo SFC

| 22 October 2017; 3:30 pm Final | Castlebar Mitchels | 0-15 - 0-13 | Ballintubber | McHale Park, Castlebar; Attendance: 5,376; Referee: Brendan Corcoran (Islandeady); Man of the Match: Ger McDonagh |
| 22 October 2017; 3:30 pm Final | David Stenson 0-5 (0-4f), Barry Moran 0-3, Ger McDonagh and James Durcan 0-2 each, Danny Kirby, Eoghan O'Reilly, Neil Douglas 0-1 each | Report | Cillian O'Connor 0-6 (0-5f), Alan Plunkett 0-2, Michael Plunkett, Damien Coleman, Jason Gibbons, Alan Dillon (0-1f), Diarmuid O'Connor 0-1 each | McHale Park, Castlebar; Attendance: 5,376; Referee: Brendan Corcoran (Islandeady); Man of the Match: Ger McDonagh |

Roscommon SFC

| 22 October 2017; 4:00 pm Final | St Brigid's | 3-13 - 3-7 | Roscommon Gaels | Dr Hyde Park, Roscommon; Attendance: 1,635; Referee: Brendan Healy (St Faithleach's); Man of the Match: Peter Domican |
| 22 October 2017; 4:00 pm Final | Brian Stack 1-1, Cathal McHugh (0-3f) and Senan Kilbride (0-3f) 0-4 each, Eddie Nolan and Conor Murray 1-0 each, Darragh Sheehy, Darren Dolan, Padraig Kelly, Jack McDonnell 0-1 each | Report | Cian Connolly 1-4 (1-0 pen, 0-4f), Mark Healy and James O'Gara 1-0 each, Richard Hughes, Ronan Gleeson 0-1 | Dr Hyde Park, Roscommon; Attendance: 1,635; Referee: Brendan Healy (St Faithleach's); Man of the Match: Peter Domican |

Sligo SFC

| 22 October 2017; 4:00 pm Final | Tourlestrane | 1-13 - 1-9 | Eastern Harps | Markievicz Park, Sligo; Referee: Barry Judge (Castleconnor); Man of the Match: Johnny Kelly |
| 22 October 2017; 4:00 pm Final | Cathal Henry 1-2 (0-1f), Brian Egan (0-2f) and Liam Gaughan 0-3 (0-1f) each, Johnny Kelly 0-2, Alan Dunne, Gary Gaughan, Pat Harte 0-1 each | Report | Shane O'Grady 0-6f, Martin Doherty 1-0, Michael Clarke, Ross Donovan, Thomas Cryan 0-1 each | Markievicz Park, Sligo; Referee: Barry Judge (Castleconnor); Man of the Match: Johnny Kelly |

=== Leinster County Finals ===
Carlow SFC

| 8 October 2017; 3:45 pm Final | Éire Óg | 0-12 - 1-9 | Rathvilly | Dr Cullen Park, Carlow; Referee: David Hughes (Erin's Own Bagenalstown); Man of the Match: Alan Kelly |
| 8 October 2017; 3:45 pm Final | Darragh O'Brien (0-2f) and Eric McCormack (0-3f) 0-3 each, Eoghan Ruth 0-2, Sean Gannon, Derek Hayden, Niall Quinlan (0-1f), Cormac Mullins 0-1 each | Report | Gary Dempsey 1-2 (0-1f), Alan Kelly 0-3, Brian Murphy (0-1f) and JJ Smith 0-2 each | Dr Cullen Park, Carlow; Referee: David Hughes (Erin's Own Bagenalstown); Man of the Match: Alan Kelly |

| 22 October 2017; 3:15 pm Final Replay | Éire Óg | 2-8 - 1-8 | Rathvilly | Dr Cullen Park; Attendance: 2,500; Referee: David Hickey (Fenagh); Man of the Match: Robert Moore |
| 22 October 2017; 3:15 pm Final Replay | Jordan Morrissey 1-1, Darragh O'Brien 0-4f, Eoghan Ruth 1-0, Sean Gannon 0-2, Derek Hayden 0-1 | Report | Gary Dempsey 1-5 (1-0 pen, 0-4f), Ken Doyle, Danny Molloy, JJ Smith (1 '45) 0-1 each | Dr Cullen Park; Attendance: 2,500; Referee: David Hickey (Fenagh); Man of the Match: Robert Moore |

Dublin SFC

| 30 October 2017; 7:00 pm Final | St Vincent's | 1-8 - 0-8 | Ballymun Kickhams | Parnell Park, Dublin; Referee: David O'Connor (Naomh Mearnog) |
| 30 October 2017; 7:00 pm Final | Diarmuid Connolly 1-1, Enda Varey (0-1f) and Tomas Quinn (0-1f) 0-2 each, Craig Wilson, Gavin Burke, Shane B. Carthy 0-1 each | Report | Dean Rock 0-3f, Carl Keeley and Jason Whelan 0-2 each, Paddy Small 0-1 | Parnell Park, Dublin; Referee: David O'Connor (Naomh Mearnog) |

Kildare SFC

| 15 October 2017; 3:30 pm Final | Moorefield | 0-11 - 0-9 | Celbridge | St Conleth's Park, Newbridge, County Kildare; Referee: Noel McKenna (Ballyteague); Man of the Match: Kevin Murnaghan |
| 15 October 2017; 3:30 pm Final | Adam Tyrrell (0-4f) and Eanna O'Connor (0-3f, 1 '45) 0-4 each, Eddie Heavey 0-2, Kevin Murnaghan 0-1 | Report | David Hughes (0-2f) and Shane Harte (0-2f) 0-3 each, Kevin Flynn, Paddy Brophy, Dylan Corcoran 0-1 each | St Conleth's Park, Newbridge, County Kildare; Referee: Noel McKenna (Ballyteague); Man of the Match: Kevin Murnaghan |

Kilkenny SFC

The Kilkenny SFC champions take part in the Leinster Club Intermediate Football Championship.

26 August 2017

| Mullinavat | 3-12 – 2-5 | Railyard |

Nowlan Park, Kilkenny

Laois SFC

| 15 October 2017; 3:45 pm Final | Portlaoise | 3-13 - 0-10 | Ballylinan | O'Moore Park, Portlaoise; Referee: John Flynn (The Rock); Man of the Match: Paul Cahillane |
| 15 October 2017; 3:45 pm Final | Paul Cahillane 1-6 (0-4f), Scott Lawless 1-1, John Kavanagh 1-0, Conor Boyle 0-2, Adrian Kelly, Ciaran McEvoy, Benny Carroll, Brian McCormack 0-1 each | Report | Gary Walsh 0-7 (0-5f), Alan Farrell, Cathail Dunne, Andy McEvoy 0-1 each | O'Moore Park, Portlaoise; Referee: John Flynn (The Rock); Man of the Match: Paul Cahillane |

Longford SFC

| 8 October 2017; 4:00pm | Mullinalaghta | 0-13 - 1-7 | Abbeylara | Pearse Park, Longford; Attendance: 4,215; Referee: Aidan Dowler (Moydow Harpers); Man of the Match: Rian Brady |
| 8 October 2017; 4:00pm | Rian Brady 0-4, David McGivney (0-2f), James McGivney, Conor McElligott 0-2 each, Conan Brady, Donal McElligott, Jayson Matthews (0-1f) | Report | Robbie Smyth 1-4 (1-0 pen, 0-4f), James McEntire, Barry Smyth, Jason Kelly (0-1f) 0-1 each | Pearse Park, Longford; Attendance: 4,215; Referee: Aidan Dowler (Moydow Harpers); Man of the Match: Rian Brady |

Louth SFC

| 15 October 2017; 3:30 pm Final | Newtown Blues | 2-10 - 0-5 | Dundalk Gaels | Drogheda Park; Referee: David Fedigan (Hunterstown Rovers); Man of the Match: Ross Nally |
| 15 October 2017; 3:30 pm Final | Ross Nally 1-5 (0-4f), Ciaran Downey 0-3, Conor Moore 1-0, Kevin Carr and Robert Carr 0-1 each | Report | Éanna McArdle 0-2f, Derek Crilly (0-1f), David Moloney, Barry Watters 0-1 each | Drogheda Park; Referee: David Fedigan (Hunterstown Rovers); Man of the Match: Ross Nally |

Meath SFC

| 29 October 2017; 3:00 pm Final | Simonstown Gaels | 2-9 - 0-7 | Summerhill | Páirc Tailteann, Navan; Attendance: 5,040; Referee: Liam O'Brien (Duleek-Bellewstown); Man of the Match: Padraig McKeever |
| 29 October 2017; 3:00 pm Final | Padraig McKeever 1-4 (0-2f), Conor Sheridan 1-2, Shane O'Rourke, Sean Tobin, Seamus Kenny 0-1 each | Report | Brian Ennis 0-3 (0-2f), Barry Dardis (1 '45), Sean Dalton, Caolan Young, David Dalton 0-1 each | Páirc Tailteann, Navan; Attendance: 5,040; Referee: Liam O'Brien (Duleek-Bellewstown); Man of the Match: Padraig McKeever |

Offaly SFC

| 15 October 2017; 3:30 pm Final | Rhode | 0-12 - 0-9 | Clara | O'Connor Park, Tullamore; Attendance: 5,272; Referee: Ger Keyes (Shamrocks); Man of the Match: Niall McNamee |
| 15 October 2017; 3:30 pm Final | Niall McNamee 0-8 (0-5f, 1 '45), Ruairi McNamee 0-2, Paul McPadden and Stephen Hannon 0-1 each | Report | Thomas Deehan 0-3 (0-2f), John O'Hara and Pa Smith 0-2 each, Robert Mitchell and Graham Guilfoyle 0-1 each | O'Connor Park, Tullamore; Attendance: 5,272; Referee: Ger Keyes (Shamrocks); Man of the Match: Niall McNamee |

Westmeath SFC

| 29 October 2017; 3:30 pm Final | St Loman's Mullingar | 3-13 - 0-14 | Tyrrellspass | Cusack Park, Mullingar; Attendance: 5,276; Referee: Declan Nugent (Maryland); Man of the Match: John Heslin |
| 29 October 2017; 3:30 pm Final | John Heslin 2-6 (0-6f), Sean Flanagan 1-1, Ken Casey 0-3, Shane Dempsey 0-2, Paul Sharry 0-1 | Report | Ger Egan 0-9 (0-8f), Conor Slevin 0-2 (0-1f), Ben Gavin, Aaron O'Brien, David Glennon 0-1 each | Cusack Park, Mullingar; Attendance: 5,276; Referee: Declan Nugent (Maryland); Man of the Match: John Heslin |

Wexford SFC

| 29 October 2017; 3:00 pm | Starlights | 0-17 - 1-8 | St Martin's | Wexford Park; Referee: Barry Redmond (Clonard); Man of the Match: Liam Ryan |
| 29 October 2017; 3:00 pm | Alan Tobin (0-1f) and Darragh Pepper 0-4 each, Dillon Redmond 0-3f, Rory O'Connor 0-2, Kevin Foley, Liam Ryan, Richard Farrell, Eamonn Furlong 0-1 each | Report | Ciaran Lyng 1-3 (0-3f), Jack O'Connor and Jake Firman 0-2 each, Rory O'Connor 0-1 | Wexford Park; Referee: Barry Redmond (Clonard); Man of the Match: Liam Ryan |

Wicklow SFC

| 15 October 2017; 3:00 pm Final | Rathnew | 3-8 - 0-12 | Blessington | Aughrim Park, County Wicklow; Referee: Declan Peppard (Hollywood); Man of the Match: Nicky Mernagh |
| 15 October 2017; 3:00 pm Final | Mark Doyle 1-1, James Stafford and Leighton Glynn 1-0 each, Eddie Doyle 0-3 (0-2f), Theo Smith, Graham Merrigan, Nicky Mernagh, Jody Merrigan 0-1 each | | Eoin Keogh, Anto McLoughlin, Patrick O'Connor, Curtis Geraghty (0-1f) 0-2 each, Paul McLoughlin, Brian Carroll, Michael McLoughlin, David Boothman 0-1 each | Aughrim Park, County Wicklow; Referee: Declan Peppard (Hollywood); Man of the Match: Nicky Mernagh |

=== Munster County Finals ===
Clare SFC

| 29 October 2017; 3:00 pm Final | Kilmurry-Ibrickane | 1-14 - 0-14 | Clondegad | Cusack Park, Ennis; Attendance: 4,916; Referee: Pat Cosgrove (Corofin); Man of the Match: Enda Coughlan |
| 29 October 2017; 3:00 pm Final | Keelan Sexton 0-4 (0-2f), I McInerney 0-3f, Peter O'Dwyer 1-0, Stephen Moloney and Noel Downes 0-2 each, Darragh Sexton, Dermot Coughlan, Michael O'Dwyer 0-1 each | Report | Podge McMahon 0-4 (0-3f), Tony Kelly 0-3, Gary Brennan (0-1f) and Eoghan Donnellan 0-2 each, Tadhg Lynch, Gearoid O'Connell, Shane Brennan 0-1 each | Cusack Park, Ennis; Attendance: 4,916; Referee: Pat Cosgrove (Corofin); Man of the Match: Enda Coughlan |

Cork SFC

| 15 October 2017; 4:00 pm Final | Nemo Rangers | 0-14 - 0-14 | St Finbarr's | Páirc Uí Chaoimh, Cork; Attendance: 9,564; Referee: Conor Lane (Banteer) |
| 15 October 2017; 4:00 pm Final | Luke Connolly 0-4 (0-2f), Barry O'Driscoll, Colin O'Brien, Paddy Gumley 0-2, Alan O'Donovan, Jack Horgan, Paul Kerrigan, Ciaran Dalton 0-1 each | Report | Stephen Sherlock 0-8 (0-6f), Colin Lyons and Denis O'Brien 0-2 each, Ian Maguire and Cillian Myers-Murray 0-1 each | Páirc Uí Chaoimh, Cork; Attendance: 9,564; Referee: Conor Lane (Banteer) |

| 22 October 2017; 1:00 pm Replay | Nemo Rangers | 4-12 - 3-13 | St Finbarr's | Páirc Uí Chaoimh; Attendance: 16,226; Referee: James Bermingham (Bride Rovers); Man of the Match: Jack Horgan |
| 22 October 2017; 1:00 pm Replay | Paul Kerrigan 1-2, Jack Horgan and Luke Connolly 1-1 each, Adrian Grainey 1-0, Paddy Gumley and Ciaran Dalton 0-2, Tomás Ó Sé, Kevin Fulignati, Alan O'Donovan, Barry O'Driscoll 0-1 each | Report | Stephen Sherlock 2-7 (0-3f), Eoin Finn 1-0, Robert O'Mahony 0-2, Colin Lyons, Dylan Quinn, Denis O'Brien, Enda Dennehy 0-1 each | Páirc Uí Chaoimh; Attendance: 16,226; Referee: James Bermingham (Bride Rovers); Man of the Match: Jack Horgan |

Kerry SFC

| 22 October 2017; 3:00 pm Final | Dr Crokes | 0-17 - 1-12 | South Kerry | Austin Stack Park, Tralee; Referee: Brendan Griffin (Clounmacon); Man of the Match: Gavin White |
| 22 October 2017; 3:00 pm Final | Daithi Casey 0-5 (0-3f), Michael Burns and Kieran O'Leary 0-4 each, Tony Brosnan 0-2, Gavin White and Jordan Kiely 0-1 | Report | Bryan Shehan 0-7 (0-3f, 1 '45), Ian Galvin 1-0, Paul O'Donoghue 0-2, Brendan O'Sullivan, Conor O'Shea, Ronan Hussey 0-1 each | Austin Stack Park, Tralee; Referee: Brendan Griffin (Clounmacon); Man of the Match: Gavin White |

Limerick SFC

| 22 October 2017; 4:00 pm Final | Adare | 2-10 - 1-10 | Newcastle West | Gaelic Grounds, Limerick; Referee: Johnny Murphy (Glenroe-Ballylanders); Man of the Match: Hugh Bourke |
| 22 October 2017; 4:00 pm Final | Hugh Bourke 1-5 (0-3f), Jack English 1-0, Mikey Lyons and Robbie Biurke (0-1f) 0-2 each, Charlie McCarthy 0-1 | Report | Iain Corbett 1-2, Jamie Lee 0-4 (0-1f), Paul Hannan, Stephen Kelly, Thomas Quliigan (0-1f), Michael Quilligan 0-1 each | Gaelic Grounds, Limerick; Referee: Johnny Murphy (Glenroe-Ballylanders); Man of the Match: Hugh Bourke |

Tipperary SFC

| 15 October 2017; 3:30 pm Final | Clonmel Commercials | 2-9 - 0-8 | Killenaule | Semple Stadium, Thurles; Attendance: 2,451; Referee: Derek O'Mahoney (Ardfinnan); Man of the Match: Michael Quinlivan |
| 15 October 2017; 3:30 pm Final | Michael Quinlivan 0-4, Jamie Peters and Richie Gunne 1-0 each, Jason Lonergan 0-3 (0-2f), Jack Kennedy (0-1f) and Eoin Fitzgerald 0-1 each | Report | Kieran Bergin 0-3 (0-2f), John O'Dwyer 0-2, Matthew O'Donnell (1 '45), Paddy Codd, Tony Doyle (0-1f) 0-1 each | Semple Stadium, Thurles; Attendance: 2,451; Referee: Derek O'Mahoney (Ardfinnan); Man of the Match: Michael Quinlivan |

Waterford SFC

| 3 December 2017; 2:00 pm Final | Stradbally | 1-15 - 1-14 aet | The Nire | Fraher Field, Dungarvan; Referee: Anthony Fitzgerald (Gaultier); Man of the Match: Shane Aherne |
| 3 December 2017; 2:00 pm Final | Eoin O'Brien 0-4 (0-1f), Ger Crowley 1-0, Shane Aherne 0-3, Daniel Weldon and Robert Aherne (0-1f) 0-2 each, Jack Mullaney, Michael Walsh, Tommy Connors, Michael Sweeney 0-1 each | Report | Conor Gleeson 0-8 (0-5f), Tom Barron 1-1, Shane Walsh 0-3, Diarmuid Murphy (0-1f) and Dermot Ryan 0-1 each | Fraher Field, Dungarvan; Referee: Anthony Fitzgerald (Gaultier); Man of the Match: Shane Aherne |

=== Ulster County Finals ===
Antrim SFC

| 15 October 2017; 3:15 pm Final | Lámh Dhearg | 0-15 - 0-13 | St John's | Glenavy, County Antrim; Referee: Eamonn McAuley (Erin’s Own) |
| 15 October 2017; 3:15 pm Final | Paddy Cunningham 0-8 (0-5f), Paddy Mervyn, Declan Lynch, Brendan McComb, Ciaran Flaherty, Conor Murray, Ryan Murray, Kevin Quinn 0-1 each | Report | Patrick McBride 0-5 (0-2f), Jack Hannigan 0-4, Ryan McNulty 0-2 (0-1f), Conor Johnston and Matthew Fitzpatrick 0-1 each | Glenavy, County Antrim; Referee: Eamonn McAuley (Erin’s Own) |

Armagh SFC

| 15 October 2017; 5:00 pm Final | Armagh Harps | 2-9 - 0-11 | Maghery | Athletic Grounds, Armagh; Attendance: 7,061; Referee: Kevin Faloon; Man of the Match: Ultan Lennon |
| 15 October 2017; 5:00 pm Final | Ultan Lennon 1-5 (0-3f), Ryan McShane 1-1, Conor White, Joe McElroy (0-1f), Conor Murphy 0-1 each | Report | Stefan Forker (0-1f) and Aidan Forker (0-2f) 0-3 each, James Lavery, Connor Mackle, Ronan Lappin, David Fox, Seamus Forker 0-1 each | Athletic Grounds, Armagh; Attendance: 7,061; Referee: Kevin Faloon; Man of the Match: Ultan Lennon |

Cavan SFC

| 8 October 2017; 3:30pm | Cavan Gaels | 0-13 - 0-8 | Castlerahan | Breffni Park, Cavan; Referee: Gerry Sheridan (Mullahoran); Man of the Match: Seánie Johnston |
| 8 October 2017; 3:30pm | Seanie Johnston 0-5 (0-2f), Robert Maloney-Derham, Niall Smith, Martin Dunne (0-1f) 0-2 each, Barry Fortune and Declan Meehan 0-1 each | Report | Oisin Kiernan 0-2 (1 '45), Paul Smith, Cormac Daly, Sean Brady, Cian Mackey (0-1f), Oisin O'Connell, Cian McEnroe (0-1f) 0-1 each | Breffni Park, Cavan; Referee: Gerry Sheridan (Mullahoran); Man of the Match: Seánie Johnston |

Derry SFC

| 24 September 2017; 3:30pm | Slaughtneil | 4-12 - 1-11 | Ballinascreen | Páirc na gCeilteach, Derry; Attendance: 4,029; Referee: Daniel Mullan (Glenullin); Man of the Match: Shane McGuigan |
| 24 September 2017; 3:30pm | Shane McGuigan 2-4 (0-1f), Chrissy McKaigue and Keelan Feeney 1-0 each, Christopher Bradley 0-3, Padraig Cassidy, Paul Bradley (0-1f), Meehaul McGrath, Sé McGuigan, Ronan Bradley 0-1 each | Report | Shane Mulgrew 0-4f, Anton Kelly 1-0, Phillip Bradley and Brendan Herron 0-2 each, Benny Heron, Ronan Murphy, Barry Grant 0-1 each | Páirc na gCeilteach, Derry; Attendance: 4,029; Referee: Daniel Mullan (Glenullin); Man of the Match: Shane McGuigan |

Donegal SFC

| 15 October 2017; 4:00 pm Final | Kilcar | 0-7 - 0-4 | Naomh Conaill | MacCumhaill Park, Ballybofey; Attendance: 6,930; Referee: Enda McFeely (St Mary's Convoy); Man of the Match: Mark McHugh |
| 15 October 2017; 4:00 pm Final | Paddy McBrearty 0-3 (0-2f), Ryan McHugh, Michael Hegarty, Mark McHugh, Conor Doherty 0-1 each | Report | Dermot Molloy 0-2f, Ciaran Thompson and Eunan Doherty 0-1 each | MacCumhaill Park, Ballybofey; Attendance: 6,930; Referee: Enda McFeely (St Mary's Convoy); Man of the Match: Mark McHugh |

Down SFC

| 1 October 2017; 3:00pm | Kilcoo | 0-13 - 0-11 | Burren | Páirc Esler, Newry; Referee: Paul Faloon |
| 1 October 2017; 3:00pm | Dylan Ward and Paul Devlin (0-4f) 0-4 each, Jerome Johnston 0-2, Darragh O'Hanlon (0-1f), Aaron Morgan, Conor Laverty 0-1 each | Report | Donal O'Hare 0-6 (0-3f), Cathal Murdock 0-2 (0-1f, 1 '45), Ryan Treanor, Kevin McKernan, Daniel McCartan 0-1 each | Páirc Esler, Newry; Referee: Paul Faloon |

Fermanagh SFC

| 1 October 2017; 4:00pm | Derrygonnelly Harps | 0-15 - 0-8 | Devenish St Mary's | Brewster Park, Enniskillen; Attendance: 3,123; Referee: Gerard McLaughlin (Ederney); Man of the Match: Conall Jones |
| 1 October 2017; 4:00pm | Gary McKenna 0-3f, Leigh Jones, Paul Ward (0-1f), Declan Cassidy, Conall Jones (0-1f) 0-2 each, Kevin Cassidy, Eamon McHugh (1 '45), Ryan Jones, Garvan Jones 0-1 each | Report | Terry O'Flanagan 0-6f and Christopher O'Brien 0-2 | Brewster Park, Enniskillen; Attendance: 3,123; Referee: Gerard McLaughlin (Ederney); Man of the Match: Conall Jones |

Monaghan SFC

| 15 October 2017; 3:30 pm | Scotstown | 2-17 - 0-13 | Magheraclooone | St Tiernach's Park, Clones; Referee: Xavier Coyle (Tyholland); Man of the Match: Conor McCarthy |
| 15 October 2017; 3:30 pm | Conor McCarthy 1-8 (0-4f), Darren Hughes 1-1, Rory Beggan 0-3 (2 '45, 0-1f), Damien McArdle, James Hamill, Shane Carey, Dermot McCrudden, Orin Heaphey 0-1 each | Report | Tomas Freeman 0-5f, Michael Metzger 0-3 (0-2f), Gavin Doogan 0-2, James Ward, Jamie Kieran, Allan Kieran 0-1 each | St Tiernach's Park, Clones; Referee: Xavier Coyle (Tyholland); Man of the Match: Conor McCarthy |

Tyrone SFC

| 15 October 2017; 4:00 pm Final | Omagh | 0-10 - 0-8 | Errigal Ciarán | Healy Park, Omagh; Attendance: 7,375; Referee: Shane Dorrity (Coalisland); Man of the Match: Conan Grugan |
| 15 October 2017; 4:00 pm Final | Conan Grugan (0-1f), Ronan O’Neill (0-2f), Connor O’Donnell (0-1f) 0-3 each, Joe McMahon 0-1 | Report | Peter Harte 0-5 (0-3f), Peter Og McCartan, Darren Canavan, Ryan Lynch (0-1f) 0-1 each | Healy Park, Omagh; Attendance: 7,375; Referee: Shane Dorrity (Coalisland); Man of the Match: Conan Grugan |

=== London Final ===
London SFC

| 22 October 2017; 2:30 pm | Fulham Irish | 0-15 - 1-11 | Tir Chonaill Gaels | McGovern Park, Ruislip; Referee: M Maher |
| 22 October 2017; 2:30 pm | Liam Staunton 0-5 (0-3f), Eoin Mulligan 0-3f, Peadar Friel (0-2f) and Daniel Eastwood 0-2 each, Michael Murphy, Marty Hughes, Brendan Martin 0-1 each | Report | Killian Butler 0-4, Joe Roberts 1-0, Liam Gavaghan (0-2f) and John McGrath 0-2 each, Marty McCoy, Mark Gottshe (1 '45), Adrian Hanlon 0-1 each | McGovern Park, Ruislip; Referee: M Maher |

== Provincial championships ==
=== Connacht ===
Quarter-finals
Castlebar Mitchels | 0-16
Mohill | 0-11

Semi-finals
Castlebar Mitchels | 1-13
Tourlestrane | 0-9
Corofin | 2-15
St Brigid's | 1-14

Connacht final
Castlebar Mitchels | 1-12
Corofin | 2-13

==== Quarter-final ====
| 4 November 2017; 2:00 pm | Castlebar Mitchels | 0-16 - 0-11 | Mohill | MacHale Park; Referee: Marty Duffy (Enniscrone/Kilgass); Man of the Match: Neil Douglas |
| 4 November 2017; 2:00 pm | Cian Costello, David Stenson (0-3f), Neil Douglas 0-3 each, Barry Moran 0-2, Ger McDonagh, Eoghan O'Reilly, Aidan Walsh, Danny Kirby, Ray O'Malley 0-1 each | Report | Keith Beirne 0-7 (0-6f), Ronan Kennedy 0-2, Oisin Madden and Keith Keegan 0-1 each | MacHale Park; Referee: Marty Duffy (Enniscrone/Kilgass); Man of the Match: Neil Douglas |

==== Semi-finals ====
| 12 November 2017; 2:00 pm | Corofin | 2-15 - 1-14 (a.e.t.) | St Brigid's | Tuam Stadium; Referee: Eamon O'Grady (Drumkeerin); Man of the Match: Ian Burke |
| 12 November 2017; 2:00 pm | Ian Burke 1-2, Gary Sice (0-1f) and Jason Leonard (0-1f) 0-4 each, Daithi Burke 1-0, Michael Farragher 0-2, Kieran Molloy, Ronan Steede, Colin Brady 0-1 each | Report | Senan Kilbride 0-7 (0-6f), Cathal McHugh 1-3 (0-2f), Padraig Kelly 0-3, Shane Mannion (1 '45) | Tuam Stadium; Referee: Eamon O'Grady (Drumkeerin); Man of the Match: Ian Burke |

| 12 November 2017; 2:00 pm | Castlebar Mitchels | 1-13 - 0-9 | Tourlestrane | McHale Park; Referee: James Molloy (Salthill-Knocknacarra); Man of the Match: Danny Kirby |
| 12 November 2017; 2:00 pm | David Stenson 0-6 (0-5f), Danny Kirby 1-2, Neil Douglas 0-3 (0-2f, 1 '45), Patrick Durcan and James Durcan 0-1 each | Report | Brian Egan 0-4f, James Leonard, Alan Dunne, Gary Gaughan, Liam Gaughan, Johnny Kelly 0-1 each | McHale Park; Referee: James Molloy (Salthill-Knocknacarra); Man of the Match: Danny Kirby |

==== Final ====
| 26 November 2017; 2:00 pm | Corofin | 2-13 - 1-12 (a.e.t.) | Castlebar Mitchels | Tuam Stadium; Referee: Marty Duffy (Enniscrone/Kilgass); Man of the Match: Liam Silke |
| 26 November 2017; 2:00 pm | Jason Leonard 0-5 (0-3f), Colin Brady 1-1, Gary Sice 0-3 (0-2f), Michael Lundy 1-0, Martin Farragher 0-2, Ronan Steede and Barry O'Donovan 0-1 each | Report | David Stenson 0-6 (0-4f), Neil Douglas 0-5 (0-2f), Aidan Walsh 1-0, Eoghan O'Reilly 0-1 | Tuam Stadium; Referee: Marty Duffy (Enniscrone/Kilgass); Man of the Match: Liam Silke |

=== Leinster ===
The Kilkenny senior football champion competed in the All-Ireland Intermediate Club Football Championship.

Preliminary round
Newtown Blues | 0-9
Rathnew | 2-6
Rhode | 0-10
Portlaoise | 1-10
Mullinalaghta St Columba's | 1-14
Éire Óg | 1-7

Quarter-finals
Rathnew | 1-13
St. Vincents | 1-9
Portlaoise | 0-11
Moorefield | 1-9
Mullinalaghta St Columba's | 1-11
St Loman's Mullingar | 1-12
Starlights | 0-8
Simonstown Gaels | 1-12

Semi-finals
Rathnew | 2-7
Moorefield | 2-13
St Loman's Mullingar | 0-13
Simonstown Gaels | 1-8

Leinster final
Moorefield | 1-14
St Loman's Mullingar | 2-10

==== Preliminary round ====
| 29 October 2017; 2:00 pm | Newtown Blues | 0-9 - 2-6 | Rathnew | Drogheda Park; Referee: David Hickey (Fenagh) |
| 29 October 2017; 2:00 pm | Ross Nally 0-7 (0-4f), John Kermode and Robert Carr 0-1 each | Report | Mark Doyle 1-2 (0-2f), James Stafford 1-0, Jody Merrigan 0-2 (1 '45), Ross O'Brien and Eddie Doyle (0-1f) 0-1 each | Drogheda Park; Referee: David Hickey (Fenagh) |

| 29 October 2017; 2:00 pm | Mullinalaghta | 1-14 - 1-7 | Éire Óg | Pearse Park; Referee: Seamus Mulhare (The Heath) |
| 29 October 2017; 2:00 pm | David McGivney 0-5f, James McGivney 0-4, Gary Rogers 1-0, Rian Brady 0-3, Jayson Matthews 0-2 (0-1f) | Report | Darragh O'Brien 1-2 (0-1f), Sean Gannon 0-2, Ross Dunphy, Cormac Mullins, Chris Blake 0-1 each | Pearse Park; Referee: Seamus Mulhare (The Heath) |

| 29 October 2017; 2:30 pm | Portlaoise | 1-10 - 0-10 | Rhode | O'Connor Park, Tullamore; Referee: Barry Tiernan (O’Dwyers) |
| 29 October 2017; 2:30 pm | Ciaran McEvoy 1-0, Gareth Dillon, Paul Cahillane (0-3f), Brian McCormack 0-3 each, Conor Boyle 0-1 | Report | Niall McNamee 0-5 (0-2f), Niall Darby 0-2f, Alan McNamee, Paul McPadden 0-1f, Ciaran Heavey 0-1 each | O'Connor Park, Tullamore; Referee: Barry Tiernan (O’Dwyers) |

==== Quarter-finals ====
| 12 November 2017; 2:00 pm | Rathnew | 1-13 - 1-9 | St Vincents | Aughrim Park; Referee: David Gough (Slane) |
| 12 November 2017; 2:00 pm | James Stafford 1-2, Mark Doyle 0-4 (0-3f), Eddie Doyle 0-3 (0-2f), Leighton Glynn 0-2, Paul Merrigan and Ross O'Brien 0-1 each | Report | Tomas Quinn 1-3 (0-2f, 1 '45), Enda Varley 0-2, Gavin Burke, Diarmuid Connolly (0-1f), Shane B. Carthy, Ruairi Trainor 0-1 each | Aughrim Park; Referee: David Gough (Slane) |

| 12 November 2017; 2:00 pm | Moorefield | 1-9 - 0-11 | Portlaoise | O'Moore Park; Referee: David Coldrick (Blackhall Gaels); Man of the Match: Eanna O'Connor |
| 12 November 2017; 2:00 pm | Eanna O'Connor 1-5 (0-2f), Aaron Masterson, Cian O'Connor, Eddie Heavey, Niall Hurley-Lynch 0-1 each | Report | Scott Lawless 0-3 (0-1f), Graham Brody (2 '45) and Paul Cahillane 0-2 each, David Holland, Brian Mulligan, Conor Boyle, Brian McCormack 0-1 each | O'Moore Park; Referee: David Coldrick (Blackhall Gaels); Man of the Match: Eanna O'Connor |

| 12 November 2017; 2:00 pm | St. Loman's Mullingar | 1-12 - 1-11 | Mullinalaghta | Pearse Park; Referee: Cormac Reilly (St Mary's Donore); Man of the Match: John Heslin |
| 12 November 2017; 2:00 pm | John Heslin 1-7 (1-0 pen, 0-6f), Shane Dempsey 0-2, Paddy Dowdall, Ken Casey, Kieran Lynam 0-1 each | Report | David McGivney 1-0, James McGivney, Gary Rogers, Jayson Matthews (0-2f) 0-3 each, Rian Brady 0-2 | Pearse Park; Referee: Cormac Reilly (St Mary's Donore); Man of the Match: John Heslin |

| 12 November 2017; 2:00 pm | Simonstown Gaels | 1-12 - 0-8 | Starlights | Wexford Park; Referee: Anthony Nolan (Baltinglass) |
| 12 November 2017; 2:00 pm | Padraig McKeever 0-5 (0-3f), Sean Tobin 1-1, Shane O'Rourke 0-2, Niall McMahon, Brian McGrath, Nathan O'Brien, Conor Sheridan 0-1 each | Report | Ryan Mahon 0-3 (0-1f), Alan Tobin 0-2 (0-1f), Ricky Fox, Dillon Redmond (0-1f), Darragh Pepper 0-1 each | Wexford Park; Referee: Anthony Nolan (Baltinglass) |

==== Semi-finals ====
| 26 November 2017; 2:00 pm | Moorefield | 2-13 - 2-7 | Rathnew | Aughrim Park; Referee: John Hickey (Fenagh); Man of the Match: Niall Hurley-Lynch |
| 26 November 2017; 2:00 pm | Eanna O'Connor 0-8 (0-5f, 1 '45), Niall Hurley-Lynch 1-3, Mark Dempsey 1-0, Ian Meehan 0-2 | Report | Leighton Glynn 1-1 (1-0 pen), Graham Merrigan 1-0, Eddie Doyle 0-3 (0-1f), James Stafford, Danny Staunton, Jody Merrigan 0-1 each | Aughrim Park; Referee: John Hickey (Fenagh); Man of the Match: Niall Hurley-Lynch |

| 26 November 2017; 2:00 pm | St Loman's Mullingar | 0-13 - 1-8 | Simonstown Gaels | Mullingar; Referee: Fergal Kelly (Ballymahon); Man of the Match: Paddy Dowdall |
| 26 November 2017; 2:00 pm | John Heslin 0-6 (0-5f), Paul Sharry (0-1f) and Shane Dempsey 0-2 each, Ken Casey, Kieran Lynam, Conradh Reilly 0-1 each | Report | Mark McCabe 1-0, Nathan O'Brien and Padraig McKeever (0-1f) 0-2 each, Brian Conlon, Shane O'Rourke, Sean Tobin, Conor Sheridan 0-1 each | Mullingar; Referee: Fergal Kelly (Ballymahon); Man of the Match: Paddy Dowdall |

==== Final ====
17 December 2017
2:00 pm
Final

| Moorefield | 1-14 – 2-10 | St Loman's Mullingar |
|---|---|---|
| E O'Connor 0-8 (5f); R Sweeney 1-1; J Murray 0-2; K Murnaghan, D Whyte, E Heavey 0-1 each | Report | R O'Toole, K Casey 1-2 each; P Sharry, J Heslin 0-2 each; K Reilly, S Dempsey 0-1 each |

O'Moore Park, Portlaoise
Referee: Barry Tiernan, (O'Dwyers, Dublin)

=== Munster ===
Quarter-finals
Nemo Rangers | w/o
Waterford Champions | scr
Clonmel Commercials | 0-8
Dr Crokes | 0-14

Semi-finals
Nemo Rangers | 2-17
Adare | 0-4
Kilmurry Ibrickane | 0-10
Dr Crokes | 2-19

Munster final
Nemo Rangers | 0-16
Dr Crokes | 0-11

==== Quarter-finals ====
| 29 October 2017; 2:00 pm | Dr Crokes | 0-14 - 0-8 | Clonmel Commercials | Clonmel GAA Ground; Attendance: 1,813; Referee: Kevin Murphy (Nemo Rangers) |
| 29 October 2017; 2:00 pm | Micheál Burns and Daithi Casey (0-2f) 0-3 each, Johnny Buckley and Tony Brosnan 0-2 each, Fionn Fitzgerald, Kieran O'Leary, Jordan Kiely, Paul Clarke 0-1 | Report | Jamie Peters, Kevin Fahey, Kevin Harney, Jack Kennedy, Ross Peters, Michael Quinlivan, Eoin Fitzgerald, Richie Gunne 0-1 each | Clonmel GAA Ground; Attendance: 1,813; Referee: Kevin Murphy (Nemo Rangers) |

| 5 November 2017 | Nemo Rangers | walkover * | Waterford champion |

* Waterford did not complete their club championship in time (due to their county's participation in the 2017 All-Ireland Senior Hurling Championship final), and were therefore eliminated.

==== Semi-finals ====
| 12 November 2017; 2:00 pm | Dr Crokes | 2-19 - 0-10 | Kilmurry-Ibrickane | Lewis Road, Killarney; Referee: Sean Lonergan (Moyle Rovers); Man of the Match: Johnny Buckley |
| 12 November 2017; 2:00 pm | Colm Cooper 0-9 (0-6f), Kieran O'Leary 1-1, Johnny Buckley 1-0, Micheál Burns and Gavin O'Shea 0-2 each, David O'Leary, Gavin White, Brian Looney, Daithi Casey, Tony Brosnan 0-1 each | Report | Mark McCarthy 0-4, Keelan Seaxton 0-2 (0-1f, 1 '45), Ian McInerney (0-1f), Martin McMahon, Niall Hickey, Dermot Coughlan 0-1 each | Lewis Road, Killarney; Referee: Sean Lonergan (Moyle Rovers); Man of the Match: Johnny Buckley |

| 12 November 2017; 2:45 pm | Nemo Rangers | 2-17 - 0-4 | Adare | Mallow; Referee: Alan Kissane (Dunhill) |
| 12 November 2017; 2:45 pm | Barry O'Driscoll (0-2f) and Luke Connolly (0-3f) 1-3 each, Paul Kerrigan 0-6 (0-1f), Conor Horgan 0-2, Kevin Fulignati, Jack Horgan, Colin O'Brien 0-1 each | Report | Hugh Bourke 0-2f, Mark Connolly and Robbie Burke (0-1f) 0-1 each | Mallow; Referee: Alan Kissane (Dunhill) |

==== Final ====
| 26 November 2017; 2:00 pm | Nemo Rangers | 0-16 - 0-11 | Dr Crokes | Páirc Uí Rinn; Referee: Sean Lonergan (Moyle Rovers); Man of the Match: Luke Connolly |
| 26 November 2017; 2:00 pm | Luke Connolly 0-10 (0-4f, 2 '45), Paddy Gumley 0-3, Aidan O'Reilly, Paul Kerrigan, Conor Horgan 0-1 each | Report | Colm Cooper (0-3f) and Daithi Casey (0-1f) 0-3 each, Brian Looney 0-2, Gavin White, Johnny Buckley, Jordan Kiely 0-1 each | Páirc Uí Rinn; Referee: Sean Lonergan (Moyle Rovers); Man of the Match: Luke Connolly |

=== Ulster ===
Preliminary round
Kilcoo (Down) | 0-12
Slaughtneil (Derry) | 1-11

Quarter-finals
Derrygonnelly Harps (Fermanagh) | 2-8
Armagh Harps (Armagh) | 1-8
Cavan Gaels (Cavan) | 1-19
Lámh Dhearg (Antrim) | 0-10
Scotstown (Monaghan) | 1-6
Kilcar (Donegal) | 1-16
Omagh St Enda's (Tyrone) | 0-8
Slaughtneil (Derry) | 0-10

Semi-finals
Derrygonnelly Harps (Fermanagh) | 0-12; 2-15 R
Cavan Gaels (Cavan) | 0-12; 5-7 R
Kilcar (Donegal) | 0-17
Slaughtneil (Derry) | 2-17

Ulster final
Cavan Gaels (Cavan) | 0-10
Slaughtneil (Derry) | 1-15

==== Preliminary round ====
| 15 October 2017; 2:30 pm | Kilcoo | 0-12 - 1-11 | Slaughtneil | Páirc Esler, Newry; Attendance: 4,514; Referee: Niall Cullen (Erne Gaels); Man of the Match: Antoin McMullan |
| 15 October 2017; 2:30 pm | Paul Devlin 0-5 (0-2f, 1 '45), Darragh O'Hanlon 0-4f, Ceilum Doherty, Martin Devlin, JJ McLoughlin 0-1 each | Report | Shane McGuigan 0-4f, Patsy Bradley 1-0, Christopher Bradley 0-2 (0-1f), Brendan Rogers, Padraig Cassidy, Meehaul McGrath, Sé McGuigan, Cormac O'Doherty 0-1 each | Páirc Esler, Newry; Attendance: 4,514; Referee: Niall Cullen (Erne Gaels); Man of the Match: Antoin McMullan |

==== Quarter-finals ====
| 28 October 2017; 7:00 pm | Slaughtneil | 0-10 - 0-8 | Omagh St Enda's | Celtic Park; Referee: Noel Mooney (Cavan Gaels); Man of the Match: Padraig Cassidy |
| 28 October 2017; 7:00 pm | Shane McGuigan (0-4f) and Christopher Bradley (0-2f) 0-4 each, Padraig Cassidy and Sé McGuigan 0-1 each | Report | Connor O’Donnell 0-2, Hugh Gallagher, Ciaran McLaughlin, Joe McMahon (1 '45), Conor Clarke, Conan Grugan (0-1f), Ronan O'Neill (0-1f) 0-1 each | Celtic Park; Referee: Noel Mooney (Cavan Gaels); Man of the Match: Padraig Cassidy |

| 28 October 2017; 7:00 pm | Derrygonnelly Harps | 2-8 - 1-8 | Armagh Harps | Brewster Park; Referee: Daniel Mullan (Glenullin); Man of the Match: Conall Jones |
| 28 October 2017; 7:00 pm | Conall Jones 1-5 (0-1f), Paul Ward 1-0 pen, Garvan Jones 0-2, Stephen McGullion 0-1 | Report | Ultan Lennon 1-2 (0-1f, 1 '45), Gareth Swift 0-2 (0-1f), Mark McConville, Ryan McShane, Joe McElroy, Conor Murphy 0-1 each | Brewster Park; Referee: Daniel Mullan (Glenullin); Man of the Match: Conall Jones |

| 29 October 2017; 2:30 pm | Cavan Gaels | 1-19 - 0-10 | Lámh Dhearg | Breffni Park; Referee: Barry Cassidy (Bellaghy) |
| 29 October 2017; 2:30 pm | Martin Dunne 0-6 (0-1f), Micheál Lyng 1-2, Seanie Johnston 0-5 (0-1f), Robert Maloney-Derham 0-2, Kevin Meehan, Barry Fortune, Levi Murphy, Daniel Graham 0-1 each | Report | Paddy Cunningham 0-6 (0-5f), Ryan Murray 0-3, Eoin McKeown 0-1 | Breffni Park; Referee: Barry Cassidy (Bellaghy) |

| 29 October 2017; 2:30 pm | Kilcar | 1-16 - 1-6 | Scotstown | St Tiernach's Park, Clones; Referee: Ciaran Branagan (Clonduff) |
| 29 October 2017; 2:30 pm | Paddy McBrearty 0-8 (0-4f), Ryan McHugh 0-5 (0-2f), Eoin McHugh 1-0, Michael Hegarty, Ciaran McGinley, Stephen McBrearty 0-1 each | Report | Conor McCarthy 1-2, Ross McKenna 0-2, Rory Beggan (0-1f) and Shane Carey 0-1 each | St Tiernach's Park, Clones; Referee: Ciaran Branagan (Clonduff) |

==== Semi-finals ====
| 11 November 2017; 6:30 pm | Slaughtneil | 2-17 - 0-17 | Kilcar | Healy Park, Omagh; Attendance: 3,120; Referee: Sean Hurson (Galbally); Man of the Match: Christopher Bradley |
| 11 November 2017; 6:30 pm | Christopher Bradley 1-5 (0-1f, 1 '45), Sé McGuigan 1-0, Shane McGuigan 0-3 (0-1f), Meehaul McGrath, Cormac O'Doherty, Brian Cassidy 0-2 each, Karl McKaigue, Chrissy McKaigue, Padraig Cassidy 0-1 each | Report | Paddy McBrearty 0-10 (0-5f), Barry McGinley, Ciaran McGinley, Mark McHugh, Stephen McBrearty, Eoin McHugh, Andrew McClean, Matthew McClean 0-1 each | Healy Park, Omagh; Attendance: 3,120; Referee: Sean Hurson (Galbally); Man of the Match: Christopher Bradley |

| 12 November 2017; 2:00 pm | Cavan Gaels | 0-12 - 0-12 aet | Derrygonnelly Harps | St Tiernach's Park, Clones; Referee: Pádraig Hughes (Crossmaglen) |
| 12 November 2017; 2:00 pm | Martin Dunne 0-4 (0-2f), Levi Murphy 0-2, Niall Smith, Declan Meehan, Andrew Graham, Paul O'Connor, Seanie Johnston (0-1f), Darragh Sexton 0-1 each | Report | Paul Ward 0-5 (0-3f), Garvan Jones and Gary McKenna (0-1f) 0-2 each, Ryan Jones, Declan Cassidy, Conall Jones (0-1f) 0-1 each | St Tiernach's Park, Clones; Referee: Pádraig Hughes (Crossmaglen) |

| 19 November 2017; 1:45 pm Replay | Cavan Gaels | 5-7 - 2-15 | Derrygonnelly Harps | St Tiernach's Park; Referee: Sean Laverty (Moneyglass); Man of the Match: Paul O'Connor |
| 19 November 2017; 1:45 pm Replay | Paul O'Connor 3-0, Seanie Johnston 1-4 (0-2f), Barry Fortune 1-0, Kevin Meehan 0-2, Darragh Sexton 0-1 | | Paul Ward 1-2, Gary McKenna 0-5 (0-4f), Conall Jones 1-0, Kevin Cassidy 0-3, Ryan Jones and Declan Cassidy 0-2 each, Michael Jones 0-1 | St Tiernach's Park; Referee: Sean Laverty (Moneyglass); Man of the Match: Paul O'Connor |

==== Final ====
| 26 November 2017; 3:00 pm | Slaughtneil | 1-15 - 0-10 | Cavan Gaels | Athletic Grounds; Attendance: 7,591; Referee: Ciaran Brannigan (Clonduff); Man of the Match: Shane McGuigan |
| 26 November 2017; 3:00 pm | Shane McGuigan 1-6 (0-2f), Christopher Bradley 0-3 (0-1f), Ronan Bradley and Brian Cassidy 0-2 each, Chrissy McKaigue and Sé McGuigan 0-1 each | Report | Martin Dunne 0-4 (1 '45), Seanie Johnston 0-3f, Niall Murray, Stephen Murray, Niall Smith 0-1 each | Athletic Grounds; Attendance: 7,591; Referee: Ciaran Brannigan (Clonduff); Man of the Match: Shane McGuigan |

== Quarter-final ==
21 January 2018
13:00 GMT
Quarter-Final

Report

| Corofin | 3-08 – 1-04 | Fulham Irish |
|---|---|---|
| Gls: Jason Leonard (pen), Colin Brady, Ian Burke; Pts: Jason Leonard (2, 1f), Colin Brady, Cathal Silke, Michael Farragher, Ronan Steede, Gary Sice (f), Martin Farragher | | Gls: Marty Hughes; Pts: Owen Mulligan (2, 2f), Michael Murphy, Liam Staunton (f) |
Note: The quarter-final was originally scheduled for 10 December 2017, but was postponed due to snow – it was re-fixed for 21 January 2018.

McGovern Park, Ruislip
Referee: Noel Mooney (Cavan)

== Semi-finals ==
TG4

17 February 2018
15:30 GMT
Semi-Final 1

Report

| Corofin | 1-06 – 0-06 | Moorefield |
|---|---|---|
| Gls: Liam Silke; Pts: Gary Sice (3, 3f), Ronan Steede, Jason Leonard, Ian Burke | | Pts: Éanna O'Connor (2, 2f), James Murray, Cian O’Connor, Aaron Mullins, David Whyte |

O'Connor Park, Tullamore
Referee: Derek O'Mahoney (Tipperary)

TG4

24 February 2018
16:30 GMT
Semi-Final 2

Report

| Nemo Rangers | 2-19 – 1-14 (a.e.t.) | Slaughtneil |
|---|---|---|
(HT: 0-04 – 1-07)
| Gls: Luke Connolly (2); Pts: Barry O'Driscoll (5, 4f), Luke Connolly (5, 3f), Paul Kerrigan (3), Tomas O Se (2), Conor Horgan, Jack Horgan, Jack Donovan, Stephen Cronin | | Gls: Cormac O'Doherty; Pts: Christopher Bradley (9, 6f), Shane McGuigan (2), Brian Cassidy (2), Se McGuigan |

O'Moore Park, Portlaoise
Referee: Maurice Deegan (Laois)

== Final ==
TG4

17 March 2018
15:30 GMT
Final

Report

| Corofin | 2-19 – 0-10 | Nemo Rangers |
|---|---|---|
(HT: 2-09 – 0-05)
| Gls: Gary Sice, Michael Farragher; Pts: Martin Farragher (6), Gary Sice (4, 2f), Dylan Wall (2), Ian Burke (2), Daithi Burke (2), Michael Farragher, Micheal Lundy and Jason Leonard | | Pts: Luke Connolly (6, 4f), Paddy Gumley, Paul Kerrigan, Ciaran O’Shea, Jack Donovan |

Croke Park, Dublin
Referee: David Gough (Meath)

== Bracket ==
Quarter-final
Fulham Irish (London) | 1-04
Corofin (Galway) | 3-08

Semi-finals
Nemo Rangers (Cork) | 2-19
Slaughtneil (Derry) | 1-14
Moorefield (Kildare) | 0-06
Corofin (Galway) | 1-06

Final
Nemo Rangers (Cork) | 0-10
Corofin (Galway) | 2-19

== Statistics ==
=== Top scorers ===
Overall

| Rank | Player | Club | Tally | Total | Matches | Average |
|---|---|---|---|---|---|---|
| 1 | Luke Connolly | Nemo Rangers | 3-24 | 33 | 4 | 8.25 |
| 2 | Éanna O'Connor | Moorefield | 1-23 | 26 | 4 | 6.50 |
| 2 | Christopher Bradley | Slaughtneil | 1-23 | 26 | 5 | 5.20 |
| 3 | Shane McGuigan | Slaughtneil | 1-19 | 22 | 5 | 4.40 |
| 4 | John Heslin | St Loman's | 1-15 | 18 | 3 | 6.00 |
| 4 | Gary Sice | Corofin | 1-15 | 18 | 5 | 3.40 |
| 4 | Paddy McBrearty | Kilcar | 0-18 | 18 | 2 | 9.00 |
| 5 | Seánie Johnston | Cavan Gaels | 1-13 | 16 | 4 | 4.00 |
| 5 | Jason Leonard | Corofin | 1-13 | 16 | 5 | 3.20 |
| 6 | David Stenson | Castlebar Mitchels | 0-15 | 15 | 3 | 5.00 |

In a single game

| Rank | Player | Club | Tally | Total | Opposition |
|---|---|---|---|---|---|
| 1 | Luke Connolly | Nemo Rangers | 2-05 | 11 | Slaughtneil |
| 2 | John Heslin | St Loman's | 1-07 | 10 | Mullinalaghta |
| 2 | Luke Connolly | Nemo Rangers | 0-10 | 10 | Dr Crokes |
| 2 | Paddy McBrearty | Kilcar | 0-10 | 10 | Slaughtneil |
| 3 | Paul O'Connor | Cavan Gaels | 3-00 | 9 | Derrygonnelly Harps |
| 3 | Shane McGuigan | Slaughtneil | 1-06 | 9 | Cavan Gaels |
| 3 | Colm Cooper | Dr Crokes | 0-09 | 9 | Kilmurry-Ibrickane |
| 3 | Christopher Bradley | Slaughtneil | 0-09 | 9 | Nemo Rangers |
| 4 | Éanna O'Connor | Moorefield | 1-05 | 8 | Portlaoise |
| 4 | Conall Jones | Derrygonnelly Harps | 1-05 | 8 | Armagh Harps |
| 4 | Christopher Bradley | Slaughtneil | 1-05 | 8 | Kilcar |
| 4 | Éanna O'Connor | Moorefield | 0-08 | 8 | Rathnew |
| 4 | Éanna O'Connor | Moorefield | 0-08 | 8 | St Loman's |
| 4 | Paddy McBrearty | Kilcar | 0-08 | 8 | Scotstown |

== TV coverage ==
TG4 continued to broadcast live and deferred club championship games. Eir Sport also secured rights to broadcast live Gaelic football and hurling club championship games. 2017 was the first time Eir Sport broadcast club championship games, and it was expected to broadcast up to 30 live games. Those games included rounds of county championships, as well as county finals and provincial and All-Ireland club championship matches.

== Awards ==
The Club Player Awards were initiated in 2018. Below is the first selection from football.

Team of the Year

1. Antóin McMullan (Slaughtneil)
2. Liam Silke (Corofin)
3. Kieran Fitzgerald (Corofin)
4. Karl McKaigue (Slaughtneil)
5. James Murray (Moorefield)
6. Chrissy McKaigue (Slaughtneil)
7. Dylan Wall (Corofin)
8. Alan O'Donovan (Nemo Rangers)
9. Michael Farragher (Corofin)
10. Éanna O'Connor (Moorefield)
11. Christopher Bradley (Slaughtneil)
12. Ian Burke (Corofin)
13. Patrick McBrearty (Kilcar)
14. Luke Connolly (Nemo Rangers)
15. Martin Farragher (Corofin)

Footballer of the Year

- Liam Silke (Corofin)

Also nominated: Ian Burke (Corofin) & Michael Farragher (Corofin)
