= Ian Burke =

Galway Gaelic footballer

Personal information
- Native name: Eoin de Búrca (Irish)

Sport
- Sport: Gaelic football
- Position: Corner forward
Club
- Years: Club
- 2012–: Corofin
Club titles
- Galway titles: 7
- Connacht titles: 4
- All-Ireland Titles: 3
Inter-county
Years	County	Apps (scores)
2017–2020	Galway	19 (1–20)
Inter-county titles
- Connacht titles: 2
- All-Irelands: 0
- NFL: 0
- All Stars: 1

Ian Burke is a Gaelic footballer from Corofin, County Galway, who played at senior level for the Galway county team.

In November 2018, Burke won an All-Star award. It was Galway's first football All-Star since 2003.

== Career ==
Burke plays his club Gaelic football for Corofin. He based his style of play upon his small height, utilising quick passes and fast movement. He played in their unsuccessful Galway Senior Football Championship campaign in 2012 but became an ever present member of the Corofin team that went on to win seven Galway SFCs in a row. During this time, they also won four All-Ireland Senior Club Football Championships.

Burke made his inter-county debut for Galway in 2017 against Donegal. In 2018, during Galway's 2018 Connacht Senior Football Championship success, Burke assisted in a third of all points scored by Galway. As a result, Burke won an All-Star award at the GAA GPA All Stars Awards. This made him Galway's first All-Star for fifteen years since Kevin Walsh. He started Galway's 2019 campaign late due to a rib injury but still managed to help Galway reach the final of the 2019 Connacht Senior Football Championship.

== Personal life ==
Burke studied at the University of Limerick, where he also played for the university GAA team. Away from Gaelic football, Burke works as a commodities trader in Dublin. He is the cousin of fellow Corofin and Galway footballer, Daithí Burke.

Awards
Preceded by Ciarán Kilkenny (Dublin)	U21 Footballer of the Year; 2013	Succeeded by Conor McHugh (Dublin)
