= 2026 Down Senior Football Championship =

Tournament details
- County: Down
- Province: Ulster
- Year: 2026
- Trophy: Frank O'Hare Cup
- Sponsor: Morgan Fuels
- Teams: 16
- Defending champions: Kilcoo

Winners
- Champions: Clonduff (10th win)
- Qualify for: 2026 Ulster Club SFC

Runners-up
- Runners-up: Burren

The 2026 Down Senior Football Championship is the 118th official edition of Down GAA's premier Gaelic football tournament for senior clubs in County Down. 16 teams compete, with the winning team representing Down in the Ulster Senior Club Football Championship. The tournament operates a double elimination format for the opening two rounds of the championship, with the winners and early round losers rejoining at the quarter-final stage.

Kilcoo came into the competition as the defending champion.

== Team changes ==
The following teams have changed division since the 2025 championship season.

=== To S.F.C. ===
Promoted from 2025 Down I.F.C.

- Saval (2025 Down Intermediate Football Champions)

=== From S.F.C. ===
Relegated to 2026 Down I.F.C.

- Liatroim Fontenoys (Lost 2025 Relegation Play Off)

== Participating teams ==
The following teams take part in the 2026 edition of the Down Senior Football Championship.

| Division One | | Division Two | | Division Three | |
|---|---|---|---|---|---|
| Bredagh | Round 2B | Ballyholland Harps | Round 2B | Drumgath | Round 2B |
| Burren | Final | Bryansford | Quarter Final | | |
| Carryduff | Semi Final | Castlewellan | Round 3 | | |
| **Clonduff** | **Champions** | Saul | Quarter Final | | |
| Glenn | Round 2B | Saval | Round 3 | | |
| Kilcoo | Semi Final | | | | |
| Loughinisland | Quarter Final | | | | |
| Mayobridge | Quarter Final | | | | |
| RGU Downpatrick | Round 3 | | | | |
| Warrenpoint | Round 3 | | | | |

Bold denotes a team still active in the competition

== Round 1 ==
The 16 participating teams were placed into an open draw. The winning teams advance to Round 2A, while losing sides proceed to Round 2B.

| 20 August 2026 Round 1 | **Glenn** | **3–17** – **2–21** | **Bryansford** | Liatroim |
| 19:30 IST (UTC+1) | | | | Venue: Fontenoy Park |
| | | | | Referee: Conor Curran; TV: Down GAA TV |

| 21 August 2026 Round 1 | **Clonduff** | **1–16** – **1–11** | **RGU Downpatrick** | Castlewellan |
| 19:00 IST (UTC+1) | | | | Venue: St Malachy's Park |
| | | | | Referee: Brian Higgins; TV: Down GAA TV |

| 22 August 2026 Round 1 | **Mayobridge** | **2–15** – **3–15** | **Carryduff** | Downpatrick |
| 14:00 IST (UTC+1) | | | | Venue: Páirc Tomás Ruséil |
| | | | | Referee: Oliver Burke; TV: Down GAA TV |

| 22 August 2026 Round 1 | **Castlewellan** | **0–12** – **1–16** | **Loughinisland** | Annacloy |
| 16:30 IST (UTC+1) | | | | Venue: Aoibh na Ceanna |
| | | | | Referee: Darren O’Hare; TV: Down GAA TV |

| 23 August 2026 Round 1 | **Drumgath** | **0–12** – **3–18** | **Kilcoo** | Mayobridge |
| 14:00 IST (UTC+1) | | | | Venue: St Patrick's Park |
| | | | | Referee: Eddie Cuthbert; TV: Down GAA TV |

| 23 August 2026 Round 1 | **Saul** | **2–15** – **0–21** (a.e.t.) (**5–4** pen) | **Bredagh** | Carryduff |
| 16:30 IST (UTC+1) | | | | Venue: Páirc Aodha Dhuibh |
| | | | | Referee: Paul Faloon; TV: Down GAA TV |
| | | **Penalty shootout** |

| 23 August 2026 Round 1 | **Warrenpoint** | **1–16** – **2–13** (a.e.t.) (**3–2** pen) | **Saval** | Hilltown |
| 18:30 IST (UTC+1) | | | | Venue: Clonduff Park |
| | | | | Referee: Colm Gribben; TV: Down GAA TV |
| | | **Penalty shootout** |

| 24 August 2026 Round 1 | **Burren** | **3–18** – **0–07** | **Ballyholland Harps** | Newry |
| 19:30 IST (UTC+1) | | | | Venue: Páirc Esler |
| | | | | Referee: Gavin Finnegan; TV: Down GAA TV |

== Round 2 ==
=== Round 2A ===
Round 2A features the eight winning teams from Round 1, with an open draw to determine the fixtures. The winning teams progress directly to the quarter-finals, with the losing teams proceeding to Round 3.

| 28 August 2026 Round 2A | **Bryansford** | **2–11** – **2–10** | **Saul** | Kilcoo |
| 19:00 IST (UTC+1) | | | | Venue: Páirc Eoghan Rua |
| | | | | Referee: Mark Turley; TV: Down GAA TV |

| 29 August 2026 Round 2A | **Loughinisland** | **1–16** – **1–14** | **Warrenpoint** | Newcastle |
| 15:30 IST (UTC+1) | | | | Venue: St Patrick's Park |
| | | | | Referee: Brian Higgins; TV: Down GAA TV |

| 30 August 2026 Round 2A | **Carryduff** | **2–15** – **2–13** | **Kilcoo** | Newry |
| 18:30 IST (UTC+1) | | | | Venue: Páirc Esler |
| | | | | Referee: Conor Curran; TV: Down GAA TV |

| 31 August 2026 Round 2A | **Clonduff** | **2–21** – **0–15** | **Burren** | Newry |
| 19:15 IST (UTC+1) | | | | Venue: Páirc Esler |
| | | | | Referee: Colm Gribben; TV: Down GAA TV |

=== Round 2B ===
Round 2B sees the eight losing teams from Round 1 compete for a place in Round 3. The losing teams from this round will be eliminated from the competition.

| 28 August 2026 Round 2B | **Glenn** | **1–10** – **2–20** | **Saval** | Burren |
| 19:00 IST (UTC+1) | | | | Venue: St Mary's Park |
| | | | | Referee: Eddie Cuthbert; TV: Down GAA TV |

| 29 August 2026 Round 2B | **Drumgath** | **0–15** – **0–21** | **RGU Downpatrick** | Castlewellan |
| 14:00 IST (UTC+1) | | | | Venue: St Malachy's Park |
| | | | | Referee: Sean Cunningham; TV: Down GAA TV |

| 29 August 2026 Round 2B | **Bredagh** | **0–15** – **0–16** | **Castlewellan** | Downpatrick |
| 18:15 IST (UTC+1) | | | | Venue: Páirc Tomás Ruséil |
| | | | | Referee: Gavin Finnegan; TV: Down GAA TV |

| 30 August 2026 Round 2B | **Ballyholland Harps** | **2–12** – **1–19** | **Mayobridge** | Kilkeel |
| 13:30 IST (UTC+1) | | | | Venue: An Ríocht GAC |
| | | | | Referee: Neil Cousins; TV: Down GAA TV |

=== Relegation Semi-finals ===
The 4 losers of Round 2B play each other in the Relegation Semi-finals. The 2 winners will secure their Senior status for 2027, while the 2 losers will face-off in the Relegation Final.

| 13 September 2026 Relegation Play-Off Semi-final | **Ballyholland Harps** | **1–19** – **3–20** (a.e.t.) | **Drumgath** | Warrenpoint |
| 13:00 IST (UTC+1) | | | | Venue: Páirc Liam Uí hÍr |

| 13 September 2026 Relegation Play-Off Semi-final | **Glenn** | **2–12** – **4–17** | **Bredagh** | Dromara |
| 13:00 IST (UTC+1) | | | | Venue: St Michael's Park |
| | | | | Referee: Kevin McGrath |

=== Relegation Final ===
The winner of the Relegation Final will maintain their Senior status into 2027, while the loser will be relegated to the 2027 Down I.F.C.

| 27 September 2026 Relegation Play-Off Final | **Ballyholland Harps** | **1–13** – **1–16** | **Glenn** | Saval |
| 13:00 IST (UTC+1) | | | | Venue: Nan Sands Park |
| | | | | Referee: Conor Curran |

Ballyholland Harps relegated to 2027 Down Intermediate Football Championship

== Round 3 ==
Round 3 is a supplementary round for teams to have a second chance at reaching the quarter-finals. This round features teams that have lost once so far in this year's competition, either winning in Round 1 and losing in Round 2A, or losing in Round 1 but winning their Round 2B fixture. The losing teams in this round are eliminated from this year's competition.

This round is seeded, meaning that in each fixture a Round 2A losing team will face a Round 2B winning team.

| 4 September 2026 Round 3 | **Saul** | **1–13** – **2–09** | **Castlewellan** | Kilcoo |
| 19:15 IST (UTC+1) | | | | Venue: Páirc Eoghan Rua |
| | | | | Referee: Kevin McGrath; TV: Down GAA TV |

| 5 September 2026 Round 3 | **Kilcoo** | **3–18** – **0–17** | **RGU Downpatrick** | Drumnaquoile |
| 17:00 IST (UTC+1) | | | | Venue: Pairc Naomh Eoin |
| | | | | Referee: Ronan Barry; TV: Down GAA TV |

| 6 September 2026 Round 3 | **Burren** | **5–19** – **0–08** | **Saval** | Hilltown |
| 17:00 IST (UTC+1) | | | | Venue: Clonduff Park |
| | | | | Referee: Jake Magill; TV: Down GAA TV |

| 7 September 2026 Round 3 | **Warrenpoint** | **1–13** – **3–10** | **Mayobridge** | Burren |
| 19:15 IST (UTC+1) | | | | Venue: St Mary's Park |
| | | | | Referee: Paul Faloon; TV: Down GAA TV |

== Quarter-finals ==
The quarter-finals see the two brackets rejoin, with the earlier Round 2A winners facing a Round 3 winner for a semi-final spot.

| 12 September 2026 Quarter-final | **Carryduff** | **0–18** – **0–07** | **Saul** | Downpatrick |
| 15:00 IST (UTC+1) | | | | Venue: Páirc Tomás Ruséil |
| | | | | Referee: Darren O’Hare; TV: Down GAA TV |

| 12 September 2026 Quarter-final | **Bryansford** | **1–05** – **3–22** | **Burren** | Kilkeel |
| 17:30 IST (UTC+1) | | | | Venue: An Ríocht GAC |
| | | | | Referee: Mark Turley; TV: Down GAA TV |

| 13 September 2026 Quarter-final | **Loughinisland** | **0–12** – **6–17** | **Kilcoo** | Newry |
| 14:45 IST (UTC+1) | | | | Venue: Páirc Esler |
| | | | | Referee: Colm Gribben; TV: TG4 |

| 14 September 2026 Quarter-final | **Clonduff** | **2–19** – **0–10** | **Mayobridge** | Newry |
| 19:15 IST (UTC+1) | | | | Venue: Páirc Esler |
| | | | | Referee: Conor Curran; TV: Down GAA TV |

== Semi-finals ==
The semi-finals will see the four winning sides face off for a place in this year's final. This round is an open draw from the four quarter-final winners.

| 25 September 2026 Semi-final | **Carryduff** | **1–13** – **2–14** | **Clonduff** | Newry |
| 19:30 IST (UTC+1) | | | | Venue: Páirc Esler |
| | | | | Referee: Colm Gribben; TV: Down GAA TV |

| 27 September 2026 Semi-final | **Burren** | **4–16** – **1–20** | **Kilcoo** | Newry |
| 17:30 IST (UTC+1) | | | | Venue: Páirc Esler |
| | | | | Referee: Jake Magill; TV: Down GAA TV |

== Final ==
The final will be played between the two semi-final winning teams, and will take place at Páirc Esler, Newry.

| 11 October 2026 Final | **Clonduff** | **1–14** – **1–10** | **Burren** | Newry |
| 16:00 IST (UTC+1) | | | | Venue: Páirc Esler |
| | | | | Referee: Conor Curran |
