= 2025 Down Senior Football Championship =

Tournament details
- County: Down
- Province: Ulster
- Year: 2025
- Trophy: Frank O'Hare Cup
- Sponsor: Morgan Fuels
- Teams: 16
- Defending champions: Kilcoo
- Qualify for: 2025 Ulster Club SFC

The 2025 Down Senior Football Championship is the 117th official edition of Down GAA's premier Gaelic football tournament for senior clubs in County Down. 16 teams compete, with the winning team representing Down in the Ulster Senior Club Football Championship. The tournament operates a double elimination format for the opening two rounds of the championship, with the winners and early round losers rejoining at the quarter-final stage.

Kilcoo came into the competition as the defending champion.

== Rule Changes ==
As part of a radical overhaul to Gaelic football, there were seven new or amended core rules introduced at the beginning of the 2025 season, which were new to this year's competition. These rules were:

- 1 v 1 throw in - at the beginning of each half, only one player from each team contests the throw in; changed from 2 v 2 previously.
- Kick-outs - must now travel beyond the new 40m arc, a new line marking on the field of play.
- Limiting back passes to a goalkeeper - passes back to a goalkeeper may only happen if both players are within their own large rectangle (penalty area), or if the goalkeeper has passed the half way line
- 40m Scoring Arc - any shots from open play or from free kicks outside the 40m scoring arc are now worth two points instead of one. This is signalled by the referee who raises two arms in the air instead of one, and the umpire will signal a successful two point shot with an orange flag, as opposed to a white flag for one point shots. The exception to this rule is the 45m set kick, awarded when a team plays the ball over their own end line, which is still awarded just one point if successfully converted.
- 3 v 3 structure - Teams must have a minimum of three players in each half at all times. A 20m free kick is awarded if any team violates this rule.
- Solo & Go - If a player is fouled, they may quickly restart the game with a "solo" (toe-tap) and can run unchallenged for the first 4m, at which point the game resumes in full open play. This is a change from the previous rule where a player had to kick pass the ball a minimum of 13m to restart the game following a foul.
- Advanced Mark - The advanced mark changed so that only kick passes from beyond the 45m line to inside the 20m line, and cleanly caught by the forward, would be awarded a mark. The forward was also allowed a free shot at goal, and if they missed or lost possession, they would then be allowed to go back to the spot of the catch and play the free kick. Previously, a free kick or mark was awarded anywhere inside the 45m line where the ball was kicked from outside the 45m line and travelled a minimum of 10m.

A new rule was also introduced where any dissent by a player on an opposing free kick would see the free kick moved forward by 50m.

== Team changes ==
The following teams have changed division since the 2024 championship season.

=== To S.F.C. ===
Promoted from 2024 Down I.F.C.

- Drumgath (2024 Down Intermediate Football Champions)

=== From S.F.C. ===
Relegated to 2025 Down I.F.C.

- Longstone (Lost 2024 Relegation Play Off)

== Participating teams ==
The following teams take part in the 2025 edition of the Down Senior Football Championship.

Division One		Division Two		Division Three	
Ballyholland Harps	Quarter Final	Bredagh	Round 3	Liatroim Fontenoys	Round 2B
Burren	Semi Final	Bryansford	Round 2B		
Carryduff	Final	Castlewellan	Round 3		
Clonduff	Semi Final	Drumgath	Round 3		
Kilcoo	Champions	Glenn	Quarter Final		
Loughinisland	Quarter Final				
Mayobridge	Round 2B				
RGU Downpatrick	Round 3				
Saul	Round 2B				
Warrenpoint	Quarter Final				

== Round 1 ==
The 16 participating teams were placed into an open draw. The winning teams advance to Round 2A, while losing sides proceed to Round 2B.

21 August 2025 Round 1	Glenn	1–21 – 0–19 (a.e.t.)	Ballyholland Harps	Burren
19:15 IST (UTC+1)				Venue: St Mary's Park
				Referee: Darren O Hare

22 August 2025 Round 1	Castlewellan	0–05 – 1–26	Burren	Mayobridge
19:00 IST (UTC+1)				Venue: St Patrick's Park
				Referee: Mark Turley

22 August 2025 Round 1	Loughinisland	2–14 – 1–12	RGU Downpatrick	Annacloy
19:00 IST (UTC+1)				Venue: Aoibh na Ceanna
				Referee: Paul Faloon

23 August 2025 Round 1	Saul	0–08 – 0–19	Carryduff	Downpatrick
15:00 IST (UTC+1)				Venue: Páirc Tomás Ruséil
				Referee: Brian Higgins

23 August 2025 Round 1	Clonduff	0–27 – 1–12	Liatroim Fontenoys	Castlewellan
17:30 IST (UTC+1)				Venue: St Malachy's Park
				Referee: Colm Gribben

24 August 2025 Round 1	Mayobridge	1–10 – 0–14	Drumgath	Hilltown
15:30 IST (UTC+1)				Venue: Clonduff Park
				Referee: Brendan Rice

24 August 2025 Round 1	Warrenpoint	0–17 – 0–11	Bredagh	Kilcoo
18:00 IST (UTC+1)				Venue: Páirc Eoghan Rua
				Referee: Conor Curran

25 August 2025 Round 1	Kilcoo	0–22 – 1–08	Bryansford	Liatroim
19:30 IST (UTC+1)				Venue: Fontenoy Park
				Referee: Ronan Barry

== Round 2 ==
=== Round 2A ===
Round 2A features the eight winning teams from Round 1, with an open draw to determine the fixtures. The winning teams progress directly to the quarter-finals, with the losing teams proceeding to Round 3.

4 September 2025 Round 2A	Warrenpoint	1–15 – 1–12	Drumgath	Burren
19:15 IST (UTC+1)				Venue: St Mary's Park
				Referee: Kevin Mc Grath

5 September 2025 Round 2A	Carryduff	3–17 – 0–12	Glenn	Liatroim
19:15 IST (UTC+1)				Venue: Fontenoy Park
				Referee: Colm Gribben

7 September 2025 Round 2A	Loughinisland	1–12 – 0–23	Burren	Hilltown
18:00 IST (UTC+1)				Venue: Clonduff Park
				Referee: Ronan Barry

8 September 2025 Round 2A	Clonduff	0–14 – 0–18	Kilcoo	Newry
19:15 IST (UTC+1)				Venue: Páirc Esler
				Referee: Jake Magill

=== Round 2B ===
Round 2B sees the eight losing teams from Round 1 compete for a place in Round 3. The losing teams from this round will be eliminated from the competition.

6 September 2025 Round 2B	RGU Downpatrick	4–14 – 1–15	Mayobridge	Castlewellan
15:30 IST (UTC+1)				Venue: St Malachy's Park
				Referee: Mark Turley

6 September 2025 Round 2B	Ballyholland Harps	0–17 – 1–13	Saul	Newcastle
18:00 IST (UTC+1)				Venue: St Patrick's Park
				Referee: Paul Faloon

7 September 2025 Round 2B	Bredagh	3–14 – 2–15 (a.e.t.)	Liatroim Fontenoys	Downpatrick
14:00 IST (UTC+1)				Venue: Páirc Tomás Ruséil
				Referee: Gavin Finnegan

7 September 2025 Round 2B	Castlewellan	0–17 – 1–13	Bryansford	Kilcoo
16:00 IST (UTC+1)				Venue: Páirc Eoghan Rua
				Referee: Brian Higgins

=== Relegation Semi-finals ===
The 4 losers of Round 2B play each other in the Relegation Semi-finals. The 2 winners will secure their Senior status for 2026, while the 2 losers will face-off in the Relegation Final.

20 September 2025 Relegation Play-Off Semi-final	Mayobridge	0–20 – 0–15	Bryansford	Kilkeel
15:00 IST (UTC+1)				Venue: An Ríocht GAC
				Referee: Gavin Finnegan

20 September 2025 Relegation Play-Off Semi-final	Saul	4–14 – 1–08	Liatroim Fontenoys	Drumnaquoile
15:00 IST (UTC+1)				Venue: Pairc Naomh Eoin
				Referee: Mark Turley

=== Relegation Final ===
The winner of the Relegation Final will maintain their Senior status into 2026, while the loser will be relegated to the 2026 Down I.F.C.

2 October 2025 Relegation Play-Off Final	Bryansford	5–18 – 2–13	Liatroim Fontenoys	Kilcoo
19:30 IST (UTC+1)				Venue: Páirc Eoghan Rua
				Referee: Eddie Cuthbert

Liatroim Fontenoys relegated to 2026 Down Intermediate Football Championship

== Round 3 ==
Round 3 is a supplementary round for teams to have a second chance at reaching the quarter-finals. This round features teams that have lost once so far in this year's competition, either winning in Round 1 and losing in Round 2A, or losing in Round 1 but winning their Round 2B fixture. The losing teams in this round are eliminated from this year's competition.

This round is seeded, meaning that in each fixture a Round 2A losing team will face a Round 2B winning team.

12 September 2025 Round 3	Loughinisland	0–16 – 1–12	Bredagh	Liatroim
19:15 IST (UTC+1)				Venue: Fontenoy Park
				Referee: Colm Gribben

14 September 2025 Round 3	Glenn	1–14 – 0–11	Castlewellan	Atticall
15:00 IST (UTC+1)				Venue: Holy Cross Park
				Referee: Kevin Mc Grath

15 September 2025^{[a]} Round 3	Clonduff	2–21 – 2–15	RGU Downpatrick	Newry
19:30 IST (UTC+1)				Venue: Páirc Esler
				Referee: Brendan Rice

15 September 2025 Round 3	Drumgath	2–09 – 1–15	Ballyholland Harps	Burren
19:30 IST (UTC+1)				Venue: St Mary's Park
				Referee: Brian Higgins

^{a} Game was originally scheduled for 14 September in St John's, Drumnaquoile, but was postponed due to a waterlogged pitch.

== Quarter-finals ==
The quarter-finals see the two brackets rejoin, with the earlier Round 2A winners facing a Round 3 winner for a semi-final spot.

20 September 2025 Quarter-final	Kilcoo	1–23 – 2–18	Loughinisland	Downpatrick
17:00 IST (UTC+1)				Venue: Páirc Tomás Ruséil
				Referee: Conor Curran

21 September 2025 Quarter-final	Carryduff	3–16 – 1–09	Ballyholland Harps	Castlewellan
15:30 IST (UTC+1)				Venue: St Malachy's Park
				Referee: Kevin Mc Grath

21 September 2025 Quarter-final	Warrenpoint	0-10 – 3-08	Clonduff	Burren
18:00 IST (UTC+1)				Venue: St Mary's Park
				Referee: Brian Higgins

22 September 2025 Quarter-final	Burren	4–16 – 0–11	Glenn	Newry
19:30 IST (UTC+1)				Venue: Páirc Esler
				Referee: Colm Gribben

== Semi-finals ==
The semi-finals will see the four winning sides face off for a place in this year's final. This round is an open draw from the four quarter-final winners.

5 October 2025^{[b]} Semi-final	Burren	1–09 – 0–20	Carryduff	Newry
13:30 IST (UTC+1)				Venue: Páirc Esler
				Referee: Paul Faloon

5 October 2025 Semi-final	Kilcoo	1–15 – 0–17	Clonduff	Newry
18:30 IST (UTC+1)				Venue: Páirc Esler
				Referee: Brendan Rice

^{b} Game was originally scheduled for 3 October. but was postponed due to the effects of Storm Amy.

== Final ==
The final will be played between the two semi-final winning teams, and will take place at Páirc Esler, Newry.

19 October 2025 Final	Carryduff	1–11 – 1–17	Kilcoo	Newry
				Venue: Páirc Esler
