= 2026 Down Intermediate Football Championship =

Gaelic football competition

Tournament details
- County: Down
- Province: Ulster
- Year: 2026
- Trophy: WJ Farrell Cup
- Sponsor: The Parador Lodge
- Teams: 16
- Defending champions: Saval

Winners
- Champions: Rostrevor (2nd win)
- Qualify for: Ulster Club IFC

Runners-up
- Runners-up: An Riocht

The 2026 Down Intermediate Football Championship was the 38th official edition of Down GAA's secondary Gaelic football tournament for intermediate clubs in County Down. 16 teams compete, with the winning team representing Down in the Ulster Intermediate Club Football Championship. The tournament operated a double elimination format for the opening two rounds of the championship, with the winners and early round losers rejoining at the quarter final stage.

Saval won the 2025 edition, and as per competition rules, did not defend their title as they qualified to play in the Senior Championship.

== Participating teams ==
The following teams took part in the 2026 edition of the Down Intermediate Football Championship.

Division Two		Division Three		Division Four	
An Ríocht	Final	Atticall	Round 2B	Ardglass	Round 2B
Annaclone	Semi Final	Darragh Cross	Round 3	Ballymartin	Round 2B
Clann na Banna	Quarter Final	Dromara	Round 3	Tullylish	Round 3
Longstone	Semi Final	Liatroim Fontenoys	Quarter Final		
Rostrevor	Champions	Newry Shamrocks	Quarter Final		
		St John Bosco	Round 2B		
		St Johns	Quarter Final		
		Teconnaught	Round 3		

== Round 1 ==
The 16 participating teams were placed into an open draw. The winning teams advance to Round 2A, while losing sides proceed to Round 2B.

20 August 2026 Round 1	Atticall	3–13 – 3–17 (a.e.t.)	Tullylish	Warrenpoint
19:15 IST (UTC+1)				Venue: Páirc Liam Uí hÍr
				Referee: Kevin McGrath

21 August 2026 Round 1	An Riocht	6–19 – 0–09	Ballymartin	Longstone
19:00 IST (UTC+1)				Venue: Longstone Park
				Referee: Mark Turley

21 August 2026 Round 1	Teconnaught	1–18 – 1–10	Dromara	Drumnaquoile
19:00 IST (UTC+1)				Venue: Pairc Naomh Eoin
				Referee: John McMullan

22 August 2026 Round 1	Longstone	2–15 – 1–12	Darragh Cross	Newcastle
14:00 IST (UTC+1)				Venue: St Patrick's Park
				Referee: Ronan Barry

22 August 2026 Round 1	St John Bosco	6–07 – 1–24	Liatroim Fontenoys	Drumgath
16:30 IST (UTC+1)				Venue: St Patrick's Park
				Referee: Sean Cunningham

23 August 2026 Round 1	Ardglass	3–08 – 6–19	Newry Shamrocks	Dromara
13:00 IST (UTC+1)				Venue: St Michael's Park
				Referee: Neil Cousins

23 August 2026 Round 1	Rostrevor	3–15 – 1–08	St Johns	Atticall
15:30 IST (UTC+1)				Venue: Holy Cross Park
				Referee: Declan Ryan; TV: Down GAA TV

24 August 2026 Round 1	Clann na Banna	0–14 – 1–13	Annaclone	Tullylish
19:15 IST (UTC+1)				Venue: Páirc na nÓg
				Referee: Jake Magill; TV: Down GAA TV

== Round 2 ==
=== Round 2A ===
Round 2A will feature the eight winning teams from Round 1, with an open draw to determine the fixtures. The winning teams progress directly to the quarter-finals, with the losing teams proceeding to Round 3.

29 August 2026 Round 2A	Newry Shamrocks	0–10 – 0–11	Liatroim Fontenoys	Mayobridge
13:30 IST (UTC+1)				Venue: St Patrick's Park
				Referee: Ronan Barry

30 August 2026 Round 2A	Tullylish	0–10 – 5–22	Rostrevor	Glenn
15:00 IST (UTC+1)				Venue: John Martin Park
				Referee: Adrian McAteer

30 August 2026 Round 2A	An Riocht	1–11 – 1–12	Longstone	Atticall
16:30 IST (UTC+1)				Venue: Holy Cross Park
				Referee: Paul Faloon; TV: Down GAA TV

31 August 2026 Round 2A	Teconnaught	1–06 – 2–11	Annaclone	Tullylish
19:00 IST (UTC+1)				Venue: Páirc na nÓg
				Referee: Declan Ryan

=== Round 2B ===
Round 2B sees the eight losing teams from Round 1 compete for a place in Round 3. The losing teams from this round will be eliminated from the competition.

29 August 2026 Round 2B	Dromara	1–14 – 0–08	Ballymartin	Drumaness
13:00 IST (UTC+1)				Venue: St Colman's Park
				Referee: Kevin McGrath

29 August 2026 Round 2B	Darragh Cross	0–24 – 2–16 (a.e.t.)	Atticall	Glasdrumman
17:30 IST (UTC+1)				Venue: St Mary's Park
				Referee: Declan Ryan

30 August 2026 Round 2B	St John Bosco	2–13 – 1–21	Clann na Banna	Hilltown
15:00 IST (UTC+1)				Venue: Clonduff Park
				Referee: Oliver Burke

31 August 2026 Round 2B	St Johns	4–17 – 1–14	Ardglass	Dundrum
19:00 IST (UTC+1)				Venue: Páirc Sean O'Caoilte
				Referee: Christopher Morgan

=== Relegation Semi-Finals ===
The 4 losers of Round 2B play each other in the Relegation Semi-Finals. The 2 winners will secure their Intermediate status for 2027, while the 2 losers will face-off in the Relegation Final.

10 September 2026 Relegation Play-Off Semi Final	Ballymartin	1–17 – 1–02	Ardglass	Dundrum
19:15 IST (UTC+1)				Venue: Páirc Sean O'Caoilte
				Referee: Neil Cousins

10 September 2026 Relegation Play-Off Semi Final	St John Bosco	0–13 – 0–14	Atticall	Tullylish
19:15 IST (UTC+1)				Venue: Páirc na nÓg
				Referee: Ronan Barry

=== Relegation Final ===
The winner of the Relegation Final will maintain their Intermediate status into 2027, while the loser will be relegated to the 2027 Down J.F.C.

2 October 2026 Relegation Play-Off Final	Ardglass	2–10 – 0–13	St John Bosco	Dundrum
19:30 IST (UTC+1)				Venue: Páirc Sean O'Caoilte
				Referee: Sean Cunningham

St John Bosco relegated to 2027 Down Junior Football Championship

== Round 3 ==
Round 3 is a supplementary round for teams to have a second chance at reaching the quarter-finals. This round features teams that have lost once so far in this year's competition, either winning in Round 1 and losing in Round 2A, or losing in Round 1 but winning their Round 2B fixture. The losing teams in this round are eliminated from this year's competition.

This round is seeded, meaning that in each fixture a Round 2A losing team will face a Round 2B winning team.

4 September 2026 Round 3	Tullylish	3–11 – 4–20	St Johns	Dundrum
19:00 IST (UTC+1)				Venue: Páirc Sean O'Caoilte
				Referee: Neil Cousins

6 September 2026 Round 3	Newry Shamrocks	3–15 – 2–16	Darragh Cross	Castlewellan
14:00 IST (UTC+1)				Venue: St Malachy's Park
				Referee: Brian Higgins

6 September 2026 Round 3	Teconnaught	1–12 – 1–17	Clann na Banna	Carryduff
17:00 IST (UTC+1)				Venue: Páirc Aodha Dhuibh
				Referee: Mark Turley

7 September 2026 Round 3	An Riocht	1–12 – 1–10	Dromara	Liatroim
19:00 IST (UTC+1)				Venue: Fontenoy Park
				Referee: Colm Gribben

== Quarter-finals ==
The quarter-finals see the two brackets rejoin, with the earlier Round 2A winners facing a Round 3 winner for a semi-final spot.

11 September 2026 Quarter-final	Longstone	3–21 – 3–15	Clann na Banna	Dundrum
19:15 IST (UTC+1)				Venue: Páirc Sean O'Caoilte
				Referee: Brian Higgins; TV: Down GAA TV

13 September 2026 Quarter-final	Rostrevor	1–14 – 0–12	Newry Shamrocks	Hilltown
12:45 IST (UTC+1)				Venue: Clonduff Park
				Referee: Oliver Burke

13 September 2026 Quarter-final	Liatroim Fontenoys	0–18 – 2–15	An Riocht	Castlewellan
17:30 IST (UTC+1)				Venue: St Malachy's Park
				Referee: Jake Magill; TV: Down GAA TV

14 September 2026 Quarter-final	Annaclone	2–11 – 0–09	St Johns	Liatroim
19:00 IST (UTC+1)				Venue: Fontenoy Park
				Referee: Declan Ryan; TV: Down GAA TV

== Semi-finals ==
The semi-finals will see the four winning sides face off for a place in this year's final. This round is an open draw from the four quarter-final winners.

26 September 2026 Semi-final	An Riocht	1–19 – 2–15	Annaclone	Kilcoo
17:30 IST (UTC+1)				Venue: Páirc Eoghan Rua
				Referee: Eddie Cuthbert

27 September 2026 Semi-final	Longstone	1–13 – 2–17	Rostrevor	Kilkeel
14:30 IST (UTC+1)				Venue: An Ríocht GAC
				Referee: Darren O’Hare

== Final ==
The final was played between the two semi-final winning teams, and took place at Páirc Esler, Newry.

10 October 2026 Final	An Riocht	1–14 – 1–15	Rostrevor	Newry
17:00 IST (UTC+1)				Venue: Páirc Esler
				Referee: Mark Turley
