= 2023 Down Intermediate Football Championship =

Gaelic football competition

Tournament details
- County: Down
- Province: Ulster
- Year: 2023
- Trophy: WJ Farrell Cup
- Sponsor: The Parador Lodge
- Teams: 16
- Defending champions: Saval

Winners
- Champions: Liatroim Fontenoys
- Qualify for: Ulster Club IFC

Runners-up
- Runners-up: Rostrevor

The 2023 Down Intermediate Football Championship is the 35th official edition of Down GAA's secondary Gaelic football tournament for intermediate clubs in County Down. 16 teams competed, with the winning team representing Down in the Ulster Intermediate Club Football Championship. The tournament operated a double elimination format for the opening two rounds of the championship, with the winners and early round losers rejoining at the quarter final stage.

Saval won the 2022 edition after defeating Rostrevor in the final, and as per competition rules, did not defend their title as they qualified to play in the Senior Championship.

Liatroim won the competition for the second time, their first since 1998.

== Participating teams ==
The following teams took part in the 2023 edition of the Down Intermediate Football Championship.

Division Two		Division Three		Division Four	
Drumgath	Round 3	An Riocht	Quarter Final	Aughlisnafin	Round 2B
Liatroim Fontenoys	Champions	Annaclone	Semi Final	Newry Bosco	Round 3
Newry Shamrocks	Quarter Final	Atticall	Round 2B	Teconnaught	Round 3
Rostrevor	Final	Ballymartin	Quarter Final		
		Clann na Banna	Round 2B		
		Darragh Cross	Quarter Final		
		St Johns	Semi Final		
		St Pauls	Round 2B		
		Tullylish	Round 3		

== Round 1 ==
The 16 participating teams were placed into an open draw. The winning teams advance to Round 2A, while losing sides proceed to Round 2B.

24 August 2023 Round 1	Annaclone	2–09 – 2–09 (a.e.t.) (3–5 pen)	St Johns	Mayobridge
19:00 IST (UTC+1)				Venue: St Patrick's Park
				Referee: Eddie Cuthbert
		Penalty shootout

24 August 2023 Round 1	Newry Shamrocks	1–15 – 0–02	Aughlisnafin	Hilltown
19:00 IST (UTC+1)				Venue: Clonduff Park
				Referee: Declan Ryan

25 August 2023 Round 1	Ballymartin	1–04 – 0–06	Atticall	Kilkeel
18:45 IST (UTC+1)				Venue: An Ríocht GAC
				Referee: Mark Turley

25 August 2023 Round 1	Newry Bosco	1–10 – 0–08	Teconnaught	Liatroim
18:45 IST (UTC+1)				Venue: Fontenoy Park
				Referee: John Mc Mullan

26 August 2023 Round 1	St Pauls	2–06 – 1–10	Darragh Cross	Carryduff
14:00 IST (UTC+1)				Venue: Páirc Aodha Dhuibh
				Referee: Karl Brannigan

26 August 2023 Round 1	An Riocht	2–16 – 1–10	Tullylish	Saval
15:00 IST (UTC+1)				Venue: Nan Sands Park
				Referee: David Carr

27 August 2023 Round 1	Drumgath	0–11 – 1–12	Rostrevor	Ballyholland
14:00 IST (UTC+1)				Venue: Father Lynch Park
				Referee: Neill Cousins

28 August 2023 Round 1	Clann na Banna	0–09 – 2–15	Liatroim Fontenoys	Ballela
18:45 IST (UTC+1)				Venue: Ballela GAC
				Referee: Gavin Finnegan

== Round 2 ==
=== Round 2A ===
Round 2A will feature the eight winning teams from Round 1, with an open draw to determine the fixtures. The winning teams progress directly to the quarter-finals, with the losing teams proceeding to Round 3.

1 September 2023 Round 2A	An Riocht	1–10 – 0–10	St Johns	Kilcoo
19:00 IST (UTC+1)				Venue: Páirc Eoghan Rua
				Referee: Declan Ryan

2 September 2023 Round 2A	Liatroim Fontenoys	1–18 – 0–07	Darragh Cross	Downpatrick
15:00 IST (UTC+1)				Venue: Páirc Tomás Ruséil
				Referee: Conor Curran

2 September 2023 Round 2A	Newry Shamrocks	2–11 – 1–12	Rostrevor	Hilltown
15:30 IST (UTC+1)				Venue: Clonduff Park
				Referee: Brian Higgins

4 September 2023 Round 2A	Ballymartin	3–09 – 0–14	Newry Bosco	Burren
19:00 IST (UTC+1)				Venue: St Mary's Park
				Referee: Neill Cousins

=== Round 2B ===
Round 2B sees the eight losing teams from Round 1 compete for a place in Round 3. The losing teams from this round will be eliminated from the competition.

31 August 2023 Round 2B	Aughlisnafin	0–08 – 2–08	Teconnaught	Ballymartin
19:30 IST (UTC+1)				Venue: Páirc Cois na Farraige
				Referee: John Mc Mullan

1 September 2023 Round 2B	Clann na Banna	3–14 – 4–17	Drumgath	Burren
19:00 IST (UTC+1)				Venue: St Mary's Park
				Referee: Kevin Mc Grath

1 September 2023 Round 2B	St Pauls	1–08 – 2–12	Annaclone	Liatroim
19:00 IST (UTC+1)				Venue: Fontenoy Park
				Referee: Mark Turley

1 September 2023 Round 2B	Tullylish	3–06 – 0–11	Atticall	Dundrum
19:00 IST (UTC+1)				Venue: Páirc Sean O'Caoilte
				Referee: Eddie Cuthbert

=== Relegation Semi-Finals ===
The 4 losers of Round 2B play each other in the Relegation Semi-Finals. The 2 winners will secure their Intermediate status for 2024, while the 2 losers will face-off in the Relegation Final.

16 September 2023 Relegation Play-Off Semi Final	Clann na Banna	4–15 – 0–09	Aughlisnafin	Glenn
13:00 IST (UTC+1)				Venue: John Martin Park
				Referee: Mark Turley

16 September 2023 Relegation Play-Off Semi Final	St Pauls	1–05 – 0–09	Atticall	Dromara
13:00 IST (UTC+1)				Venue: St Michael's Park
				Referee: Eamon Mc Carthy

=== Relegation Final ===
The winner of the Relegation Final will maintain their Intermediate status into 2024, while the loser will be relegated to the 2024 Down J.F.C.

23 September 2023 Relegation Play-Off Final	Aughlisnafin	1–08 – 1–15	St Pauls	Drumaness
13:00 IST (UTC+1)				Venue: St Colman's Park
				Referee: Colm Gribben

Aughlisnafin relegated to 2024 Down Junior Football Championship

== Round 3 ==
Round 3 is a supplementary round for teams to have a second chance at reaching the quarter-finals. This round features teams that have lost once so far in this year's competition, either winning in Round 1 and losing in Round 2A, or losing in Round 1 but winning their Round 2B fixture. The losing teams in this round are eliminated from this year's competition.

This round is seeded, meaning that in each fixture a Round 2A losing team will face a Round 2B winning team.

8 September 2023 Round 3	St Johns	1–14 – 0–04	Tullylish	Burren
19:15 IST (UTC+1)				Venue: St Mary's Park
				Referee: Gavin Finnegan

10 September 2023 Round 3	Rostrevor	3–16 – 0–05	Drumgath	Mayobridge
15:00 IST (UTC+1)				Venue: St Patrick's Park
				Referee: Conor Curran

10 September 2023 Round 3	Darragh Cross	2–12 – 0–09	Teconnaught	Drumnaquoile
16:00 IST (UTC+1)				Venue: Pairc Naomh Eoin
				Referee: Mark Turley

11 September 2023 Round 3	Newry Bosco	2–05 – 2–13	Annaclone	Tullylish
19:00 IST (UTC+1)				Venue: Páirc na nÓg
				Referee: Kevin Mc Grath

== Quarter-finals ==
The quarter-finals see the two brackets rejoin, with the earlier Round 2A winners facing a Round 3 winner for a semi-final spot.

15 September 2023 Quarter-final	An Riocht	2–09 – 6–10	Rostrevor	Newry
19:00 IST (UTC+1)				Venue: Páirc Esler
				Referee: Paul Faloon

16 September 2023 Quarter-final	Liatroim Fontenoys	0–16 – 1–08	Darragh Cross	Bright
16:00 IST (UTC+1)				Venue: Bright GAC
				Referee: Brian Higgins

16 September 2023 Quarter-final	Newry Shamrocks	0–07 – 1–10 (a.e.t.)	St Johns	Newcastle
16:00 IST (UTC+1)				Venue: St Patrick's Park
				Referee: Declan Ryan

17 September 2023 Quarter-final	Ballymartin	0–09 – 1–16	Annaclone	Mayobridge
14:00 IST (UTC+1)				Venue: St Patrick's Park
				Referee: Kevin Mc Grath

== Semi-finals ==
The semi-finals will see the four winning sides face off for a place in this year's final. This round is an open draw from the four quarter-final winners.

30 September 2023 Semi-final	St Johns	1–05 – 1–07	Rostrevor	Liatroim
18:00 IST (UTC+1)				Venue: Fontenoy Park
				Referee: Ronan Barry

1 October 2023 Semi-final	Liatroim Fontenoys	2–10 – 0–11	Annaclone	Castlewellan
14:00 IST (UTC+1)				Venue: St Malachy's Park
				Referee: Colm Gribben

== Final ==
The final was played between the two semi-final winning teams, and took place at Páirc Esler, Newry.

14 October 2023 Final	Rostrevor	1–11 – 1–13	Liatroim Fontenoys	Newry
16:45 IST (UTC+1)				Venue: Páirc Esler
				Referee: Conor Curran
