= 2024 Down Senior Football Championship =

Tournament details
- County: Down
- Province: Ulster
- Year: 2024
- Trophy: Frank O'Hare Cup
- Sponsor: Morgan Fuels
- Teams: 16
- Defending champions: Kilcoo

Winners
- Champions: Kilcoo (22nd win)
- Manager: Karl Lacey
- Qualify for: 2024 Ulster Club SFC

The 2024 Down Senior Football Championship is the 116th official edition of Down GAA's premier Gaelic football tournament for senior clubs in County Down. 16 teams compete, with the winning team representing Down in the Ulster Senior Club Football Championship. The tournament operates a double elimination format for the opening two rounds of the championship, with the winners and early round losers rejoining at the quarter-final stage.

Kilcoo came into the competition as the defending champion.

== Team changes ==
The following teams have changed division since the 2023 championship season.

=== To S.F.C. ===
Promoted from 2023 Down I.F.C.

- Liatroim Fontenoys (2023 Down Intermediate Football Champions)

=== From S.F.C. ===
Relegated to 2024 Down I.F.C.

- Saval (Lost 2023 Relegation Play Off)

== Participating teams ==
The following teams take part in the 2024 edition of the Down Senior Football Championship.

Division One		Division Two		Division Three	
Ballyholland Harps	Quarter Final	Bryansford	Quarter Final	Glenn	Semi Final
Bredagh	Quarter Final	Liatroim Fontenoys	Round 3		
Burren	Final	Longstone	Round 2B		
Carryduff	Semi Final	RGU Downpatrick	Round 2B		
Castlewellan	Round 2B	Saul	Round 2B		
Clonduff	Round 3				
Kilcoo	Champions				
Loughinisland	Round 3				
Mayobridge	Quarter Final				
Warrenpoint	Round 3				

== Round 1 ==
The 16 participating teams were placed into an open draw. The winning teams advance to Round 2A, while losing sides proceed to Round 2B.

22 August 2024 Round 1	Castlewellan	0–03 – 1–12	Mayobridge	Burren
19:30 IST (UTC+1)				Venue: St Mary's Park
				Referee: Colm Gribben

23 August 2024 Round 1	RGU Downpatrick	3–04 – 2–09	Ballyholland Harps	Newcastle
19:15 IST (UTC+1)				Venue: St Patrick's Park
				Referee: Paul Faloon

24 August 2024 Round 1	Glenn	0–06 – 1–08	Carryduff	Castlewellan
16:00 IST (UTC+1)				Venue: St Malachy's Park
				Referee: Brendan Rice

24 August 2024 Round 1	Loughinisland	0–09 – 0–12	Kilcoo	Liatroim
19:00 IST (UTC+1)				Venue: Fontenoy Park
				Referee: Brian Higgins

25 August 2024 Round 1	Longstone	0–08 – 3–08	Bredagh	Annacloy
14:00 IST (UTC+1)				Venue: Aoibh na Ceanna
				Referee: Mark Turley

25 August 2024 Round 1	Bryansford	3–09 – 1–13	Saul	Downpatrick
16:30 IST (UTC+1)				Venue: Páirc Tomás Ruséil
				Referee: Conor Curran

25 August 2024 Round 1	Burren	2–19 – 0–07	Liatroim Fontenoys	Hilltown
19:00 IST (UTC+1)				Venue: Clonduff Park
				Referee: Declan Ryan

26 August 2024 Round 1	Warrenpoint	0–07 – 0–11	Clonduff	Kilcoo
19:00 IST (UTC+1)				Venue: Páirc Eoghan Rua
				Referee: Ronan Barry

== Round 2 ==
=== Round 2A ===
Round 2A features the eight winning teams from Round 1, with an open draw to determine the fixtures. The winning teams progress directly to the quarter-finals, with the losing teams proceeding to Round 3.

29 August 2024 Round 2A	Bredagh	0–06 – 1–12	Carryduff	Liatroim
19:30 IST (UTC+1)				Venue: Fontenoy Park
				Referee: Paul Faloon

31 August 2024 Round 2A	Burren	0–15 – 0–09	Mayobridge	Newry
18:30 IST (UTC+1)				Venue: Páirc Esler
				Referee: Conor Curran

01 September 2024 Round 2A	Bryansford	0–18 – 0–17 (a.e.t.)	Ballyholland Harps	Castlewellan
17:15 IST (UTC+1)				Venue: St Malachy's Park
				Referee: Kevin Mc Grath

02 September 2024 Round 2A	Kilcoo	2–09 – 1–08	Clonduff	Newry
19:30 IST (UTC+1)				Venue: Páirc Esler
				Referee: Colm Gribben

=== Round 2B ===
Round 2B sees the eight losing teams from Round 1 compete for a place in Round 3. The losing teams from this round will be eliminated from the competition.

30 August 2024 Round 2B	Castlewellan	0–09 – 2–07	Glenn	Burren
19:15 IST (UTC+1)				Venue: St Mary's Park
				Referee: Gavin Finnegan

30 August 2024 Round 2B	Liatroim Fontenoys	0–15 – 3–05 (a.e.t.)	RGU Downpatrick	Kilcoo
19:15 IST (UTC+1)				Venue: Páirc Eoghan Rua
				Referee: Ronan Barry

31 August 2024 Round 2B	Saul	0–08 – 1–12	Loughinisland	Newcastle
16:00 IST (UTC+1)				Venue: St Patrick's Park
				Referee: Brendan Rice

01 September 2024 Round 2B	Longstone	0–08 – 2–15	Warrenpoint	Kilkeel
15:00 IST (UTC+1)				Venue: An Ríocht GAC
				Referee: Brian Higgins

=== Relegation Semi-finals ===
The 4 losers of Round 2B play each other in the Relegation Semi-finals. The 2 winners will secure their Senior status for 2025, while the 2 losers will face-off in the Relegation Final.

14 September 2024 Relegation Play-Off Semi-final	RGU Downpatrick	3–14 – 0–10	Longstone	Drumnaquoile
15:30 IST (UTC+1)				Venue: Pairc Naomh Eoin
				Referee: Brian Higgins

14 September 2024 Relegation Play-Off Semi-final	Saul	0–11 – 1–07	Castlewellan	Annacloy
16:30 IST (UTC+1)				Venue: Aoibh na Ceanna
				Referee: Darren O Hare

=== Relegation Final ===
The winner of the Relegation Final will maintain their Senior status into 2025, while the loser will be relegated to the 2025 Down I.F.C.

23 September 2024 Relegation Play-Off Final	Longstone	1–09 – 1–10	Castlewellan	Dundrum
19:30 IST (UTC+1)				Venue: Páirc Sean O'Caoilte
				Referee: Micheal Moore

Longstone relegated to 2025 Down Intermediate Football Championship

== Round 3 ==
Round 3 is a supplementary round for teams to have a second chance at reaching the quarter-finals. This round features teams that have lost once so far in this year's competition, either winning in Round 1 and losing in Round 2A, or losing in Round 1 but winning their Round 2B fixture. The losing teams in this round are eliminated from this year's competition.

This round is seeded, meaning that in each fixture a Round 2A losing team will face a Round 2B winning team.

06 September 2024 Round 3	Ballyholland Harps	2–07 – 0–12	Warrenpoint	Newry
19:30 IST (UTC+1)				Venue: Páirc Esler
				Referee: Ciarán Branagan

08 September 2024 Round 3	Clonduff	1–09 – 1–11	Glenn	Mayobridge
15:00 IST (UTC+1)				Venue: St Patrick's Park
				Referee: Ronan Barry

09 September 2024 Round 3	Liatroim Fontenoys	1–11 – 2–16	Mayobridge	Dundrum
19:15 IST (UTC+1)				Venue: Páirc Sean O'Caoilte
				Referee: Micheal Moore

09 September 2024 Round 3	Loughinisland	1–10 – 1–11 (a.e.t.)	Bredagh	Kilcoo
19:30 IST (UTC+1)				Venue: Páirc Eoghan Rua
				Referee: Kevin Mc Grath

== Quarter-finals ==
The quarter-finals see the two brackets rejoin, with the earlier Round 2A winners facing a Round 3 winner for a semi-final spot.

13 September 2024 Quarter-final	Carryduff	1–12 – 0–09	Ballyholland Harps	Kilcoo
19:30 IST (UTC+1)				Venue: Páirc Eoghan Rua
				Referee: Ronan Barry

15 September 2024 Quarter-final	Burren	2–10 – 1–10	Bredagh	Liatroim
15:00 IST (UTC+1)				Venue: Fontenoy Park
				Referee: Paul Faloon

15 September 2024 Quarter-final	Bryansford	0–11 – 0–16	Glenn	Mayobridge
17:00 IST (UTC+1)				Venue: St Patrick's Park
				Referee: Gavin Finnegan

16 September 2024 Quarter-final	Kilcoo	1–15 – 0–08	Mayobridge	Newry
19:30 IST (UTC+1)				Venue: Páirc Esler
				Referee: Colm Gribben

== Semi-finals ==
The semi-finals will see the four winning sides face off for a place in this year's final. This round is an open draw from the four quarter-final winners.

28 September 2024 Semi-final	Kilcoo	0–17 – 0–10	Glenn	Newry
				Venue: Páirc Esler

29 September 2024 Semi-final	Carryduff	1–07 – 1–10	Burren	Newry
				Venue: Páirc Esler

== Final ==
The final will be played between the two semi-final winning teams, and will take place at Páirc Esler, Newry.

13 October 2024 Final	Kilcoo	1–10 – 0–04	Burren	Newry
				Venue: Páirc Esler
