= 2023 Down Senior Football Championship =

Tournament details
- County: Down
- Province: Ulster
- Year: 2023
- Trophy: Frank O'Hare Cup
- Sponsor: Morgan Fuels
- Teams: 16
- Defending champions: Kilcoo

Winners
- Champions: Kilcoo (21st win)
- Manager: Karl Lacey
- Qualify for: 2023 Ulster Club SFC

Runners-up
- Runners-up: Burren

The 2023 Down Senior Football Championship was the 115th official edition of Down GAA's premier Gaelic football tournament for senior clubs in County Down. 16 teams competed, with the winning team representing Down in the Ulster Senior Club Football Championship. The tournament operates a double elimination format for the opening two rounds of the championship, with the winners and early round losers rejoining at the quarter-final stage.

Kilcoo came into the competition as the defending champion.

== Team changes ==
The following teams have changed division since the 2022 championship season.

=== To S.F.C. ===
Promoted from 2022 Down I.F.C.

- Saval (2022 Down Intermediate Football Champions)

=== From S.F.C. ===
Relegated to 2023 Down I.F.C.

- An Riocht (Lost 2022 Relegation Play Off)

== Participating teams ==
The following teams take part in the 2023 edition of the Down Senior Football Championship.

Division One		Division Two	
Bredagh	Round 2B	Ballyholland Harps	Quarter Final
Bryansford	Round 2B	Castlewellan	Round 3
Burren	Final	Glenn	Semi Final
Carryduff	Quarter Final	RGU Downpatrick	Quarter Final
Clonduff	Semi Final	Saul	Round 2B
Kilcoo	Champions	Saval	Round 2B
Longstone	Round 3		
Loughinisland	Round 3		
Mayobridge	Quarter Final		
Warrenpoint	Round 3		

== Round 1 ==
The 16 participating teams were placed into an open draw. The winning teams advance to Round 2A, while losing sides proceed to Round 2B.

24 August 2023 Round 1	Saul	0–12 – 0–13	RGU Downpatrick	Darragh Cross
19:00 IST (UTC+1)				Venue: St Mochai's Park
		Report		Referee: Brian Higgins

25 August 2023 Round 1	Bredagh	2–06 – 1–14	Clonduff	Downpatrick
19:00 IST (UTC+1)				Venue: Páirc Tomás Ruséil
		Report		Referee: Colm Gribben

25 August 2023 Round 1	Ballyholland Harps	0–13 – 2–15	Loughinisland	Castlewellan
19:30 IST (UTC+1)				Venue: St Malachy's Park
		Report		Referee: Darren O'Hare

26 August 2023 Round 1	Mayobridge	3–10 – 1–04	Bryansford	Kilcoo
17:00 IST (UTC+1)				Venue: Páirc Eoghan Rua
		Report		Referee: Ronan Barry

27 August 2023 Round 1	Glenn	1–11 – 1–09	Saval	Burren
14:00 IST (UTC+1)				Venue: St Mary's Park
		Report		Referee: Micheal Moore

27 August 2023 Round 1	Longstone	2–08 – 1–11 (a.e.t.) (5–4 pen)	Castlewellan	Newcastle
16:30 IST (UTC+1)				Venue: St Patrick's Park
		Report		Referee: Kevin McGrath
		Penalty shootout

27 August 2023 Round 1	Warrenpoint	1–05 – 0–12	Burren	Newry
19:00 IST (UTC+1)				Venue: Páirc Esler
		Report		Referee: Ciaran Branagan

28 August 2023 Round 1	Carryduff	0–10 – 1–13	Kilcoo	Newry
19:30 IST (UTC+1)				Venue: Páirc Esler
		Report		Referee: Conor Curran

== Round 2 ==
=== Round 2A ===
Round 2A features the eight winning teams from Round 1, with an open draw to determine the fixtures. The winning teams progress directly to the quarter-finals, with the losing teams proceeding to Round 3.

2 September 2023 Round 2A	Burren	4–10 – 0–10	Loughinisland	Newry
19:00 IST (UTC+1)				Venue: Páirc Esler
				Referee: Colm Gribben

3 September 2023 Round 2A	Longstone	2–08 – 1–17	Glenn	Rostrevor
14:30 IST (UTC+1)				Venue: Pettit Park
				Referee: Brian Higgins

3 September 2023 Round 2A	Kilcoo	1–10 – 0–05	Mayobridge	Newry
19:15 IST (UTC+1)				Venue: Páirc Esler
				Referee: Darren O Hare

4 September 2023 Round 2A	Clonduff	2–12 – 0–11	RGU Downpatrick	Newry
19:15 IST (UTC+1)				Venue: Páirc Esler
				Referee: Micheal Moore

=== Round 2B ===
Round 2B sees the eight losing teams from Round 1 compete for a place in Round 3. The losing teams from this round will be eliminated from the competition.

2 September 2023 Round 2B	Warrenpoint	1–10 – 1–10 (a.e.t.) (6–5 pen)	Bryansford	Ballymartin
17:00 IST (UTC+1)				Venue: Páirc Cois na Farraige
				Referee: Gavin Finnegan
		Penalty shootout

2 September 2023 Round 2B	Castlewellan	1–08 – 0–08	Bredagh	Tullylish
19:00 IST (UTC+1)				Venue: Páirc na nÓg
				Referee: Ronan Barry

3 September 2023 Round 2B	Ballyholland Harps	4–11 – 0–07	Saval	Newcastle
15:00 IST (UTC+1)				Venue: St Patrick's Park
				Referee: Conor Curran

4 September 2023 Round 2B	Carryduff	1–13 – 0–09	Saul	Liatroim
19:00 IST (UTC+1)				Venue: Fontenoy Park
				Referee: Ciarán Branagan

=== Relegation Semi-finals ===
The 4 losers of Round 2B play each other in the Relegation Semi-finals. The 2 winners will secure their Senior status for 2024, while the 2 losers will face-off in the Relegation Final.

17 September 2023 Relegation Play-Off Semi-final	Bryansford	0–17 – 2–12 (a.e.t.)	Saul	Drumnaquoile
13:00 IST (UTC+1)				Venue: Pairc Naomh Eoin
				Referee: Ronan Barry

17 September 2023 Relegation Play-Off Semi-final	Bredagh	1–13 – 1–08	Saval	Tullylish
13:00 IST (UTC+1)				Venue: Páirc na nÓg
				Referee: Darren O Hare

=== Relegation Final ===
The winner of the Relegation Final will maintain their Senior status into 2024, while the loser will be relegated to the 2024 Down I.F.C.

23 September 2023 Relegation Play-Off Final	Bryansford	2–17 – 2–05	Saval	Atticall
16:00 IST (UTC+1)				Venue: Holy Cross Park
				Referee: Gavin Finnegan

Saval relegated to 2024 Down Intermediate Football Championship

== Round 3 ==
Round 3 is a supplementary round for teams to have a second chance at reaching the quarter-finals. This round features teams that have lost once so far in this year's competition, either winning in Round 1 and losing in Round 2A, or losing in Round 1 but winning their Round 2B fixture. The losing teams in this round are eliminated from this year's competition.

This round is seeded, meaning that in each fixture a Round 2A losing team will face a Round 2B winning team.

8 September 2023 Round 3	Longstone	0–06 – 3–08	Ballyholland Harps	Kilcoo
19:15 IST (UTC+1)				Venue: Páirc Eoghan Rua
				Referee: Micheal Moore

10 September 2023 Round 3	RGU Downpatrick	1–14 – 3–04	Castlewellan	Newcastle
16:45 IST (UTC+1)				Venue: St Patrick's Park
				Referee: Ronan Barry

10 September 2023 Round 3	Mayobridge	1–11 – 0–10	Warrenpoint	Newry
19:00 IST (UTC+1)				Venue: Páirc Esler
				Referee: Brian Higgins

11 September 2023 Round 3	Loughinisland	1–09 – 0–13	Carryduff	Liatroim
19:15 IST (UTC+1)				Venue: Fontenoy Park
				Referee: Darren O Hare

== Quarter-finals ==
The quarter-finals see the two brackets rejoin, with the earlier Round 2A winners facing a Round 3 winner for a semi-final spot.

16 September 2023 Quarter-final	Clonduff	1–12 – 0–05	RGU Downpatrick	Liatroim
19:30 IST (UTC+1)				Venue: Fontenoy Park
				Referee: Colm Gribben

17 September 2023 Quarter-final	Kilcoo	0–09 – 0–05	Carryduff	Downpatrick
16:00 IST (UTC+1)				Venue: Páirc Tomás Ruséil
		Report		Referee: Micheal Moore

17 September 2023 Quarter-final	Burren	1–09 – 1–03	Ballyholland Harps	Newry
19:00 IST (UTC+1)				Venue: Páirc Esler
		Report		Referee: Gavin Finnegan

18 September 2023 Quarter-final	Glenn	1–12 – 0–08	Mayobridge	Kilcoo
19:15 IST (UTC+1)				Venue: Páirc Eoghan Rua
				Referee: Conor Curran

== Semi-finals ==
The semi-finals will see the four winning sides face off for a place in this year's final. This round is an open draw from the four quarter-final winners.

29 September 2023 Semi-final	Burren	2–12 – 0–08	Glenn	Newry
19:30 IST (UTC+1)				Venue: Páirc Esler
				Referee: Brian Higgins

1 October 2023 Semi-final	Kilcoo	2–15 – 1–07	Clonduff	Newry
17:30 IST (UTC+1)				Venue: Páirc Esler
				Referee: Conor Curran

== Final ==
The final will be played between the two semi-final winning teams, and will take place at Páirc Esler, Newry.

15 October 2023 Final	Burren	0–09 – 2–12	Kilcoo	Newry
				Venue: Páirc Esler
		Report		Referee: Brian Higgins
