= 2022 Down Senior Football Championship =

Tournament details
- County: Down
- Province: Ulster
- Year: 2022
- Trophy: Frank O'Hare Cup
- Sponsor: Morgan Fuels
- Teams: 16
- Defending champions: Kilcoo

Winners
- Champions: Kilcoo (20th win)
- Qualify for: 2022 Ulster Club SFC

Runners-up
- Runners-up: Warrenpoint

The 2022 Down Senior Football Championship was the 114th official edition of Down GAA's premier Gaelic football tournament for senior clubs in County Down. 16 teams competed, with the winning team representing Down in the Ulster Senior Club Football Championship. The tournament operated a double elimination format for the opening two rounds of the championship, with the winners and early round losers rejoining at the quarter-final stage.

Kilcoo came into the competition as defending Down, Ulster and All-Ireland champions.

== Team changes ==
The following teams have changed division since the 2021 championship season.

=== To S.F.C. ===
Promoted from 2021 Down I.F.C.

- An Riocht (2021 Down Intermediate Football Champions)

=== From S.F.C. ===
Relegated to 2022 Down I.F.C.

- Rostrevor (Lost 2021 Relegation Play Off)

–

== Participating teams ==
The following teams take part in the 2022 edition of the Down Senior Football Championship.

Division One

Ballyholland Harps (Round 3)
Bryansford (Round 2B)
Burren (quarter-final)
Carryduff (quarter-final)
Castlewellan (quarter-final)
Clonduff (quarter-final)
Kilcoo (champions)
Loughinisland (semi-final)
Mayobridge (semi-final)
RGU Downpatrick (Round 3)
Warrenpoint (final)

Division Two

An Riocht (Round 2B)
Bredagh (Round 2B)
Glenn (Round 3)
Longstone (Round 2B)
Saul (Round 3)

== Round 1 ==
The 16 participating teams were placed into an open draw. The winning teams advance to Round 2A, while losing sides proceed to Round 2B.

| 25 August 2022 Round 1 | Glenn | 3–13 – 1–11 | Bredagh | Liatroim |
| 19:00 IST (UTC+1) | | | | Venue: Fontenoy Park |
| | | | | Referee: Peter Owens |

| 25 August 2022 Round 1 | Loughinisland | 1–12 – 1–09 | Castlewellan | Darragh Cross |
| 19:00 IST (UTC+1) | | | | Venue: St Mochai's Park |
| | | | | Referee: Adrian Sharvin |

| 26 August 2022 Round 1 | Kilcoo | 2–12 – 0–04 | Clonduff | Newry |
| 19:30 IST (UTC+1) | | | | Venue: Páirc Esler |
| | | | | Referee: Colm Gribben |

| 27 August 2022 Round 1 | RGU Downpatrick | 2–15 – 2–08 | An Riocht | Drumnaquoile |
| 17:00 IST (UTC+1) | | | | Venue: Pairc Naomh Eoin |
| | | | | Referee: Brendan Rice |

| 28 August 2022 Round 1 | Ballyholland Harps | 1–12 – 0–13 | Longstone | Kilkeel |
| 15:00 IST (UTC+1) | | | | Venue: An Ríocht GAC |
| | | | | Referee: Brian Higgins |

| 28 August 2022 Round 1 | Carryduff | 1–12 – 0–06 | Bryansford | Downpatrick |
| 18:00 IST (UTC+1) | | | | Venue: Páirc Tomás Ruséil |
| | | | | Referee: Conor Curran |

| 28 August 2022 Round 1 | Warrenpoint | 1–11 – 0–05 | Saul | Hilltown |
| 18:00 IST (UTC+1) | | | | Venue: Clonduff Park |
| | | | | Referee: Ronan Barry |

| 29 August 2022 Round 1 | Burren | 2–13 – 1–12 (a.e.t.) | Mayobridge | Newry |
| 19:30 IST (UTC+1) | | | | Venue: Páirc Esler |
| | | | | Referee: Paul Faloon |

== Round 2 ==
=== Round 2A ===
Round 2A will feature the eight winning teams from Round 1, with an open draw to determine the fixtures. The winning teams progress directly to the quarter-finals, with the losing teams proceeding to Round 3.

| 9 September 2022 Round 2A | Loughinisland | 0–14 – 0–11 | Warrenpoint | Kilcoo |
| 19:30 IST (UTC+1) | | | | Venue: Páirc Eoghan Rua |
| | | | | Referee: Conor Curran |

| 10 September 2022 Round 2A | Glenn | 0–08 – 3–09 | Carryduff | Downpatrick |
| 14:00 IST (UTC+1) | | | | Venue: Páirc Tomás Ruséil |
| | | | | Referee: Christopher Morgan |

| 11 September 2022 Round 2A | Burren | 2–03 – 0–02 | RGU Downpatrick | Newcastle |
| 17:00 IST (UTC+1) | | | | Venue: St Patrick's Park |
| | | | | Referee: Colm Gribben |

| 12 September 2022 Round 2A | Kilcoo | 3–10 – 0–08 | Ballyholland Harps | Newry |
| 19:30 IST (UTC+1) | | | | Venue: Páirc Esler |
| | | | | Referee: Brendan Rice |

=== Round 2B ===
Round 2B sees the eight losing teams from Round 1 compete for a place in Round 3. The losing teams from this round will be eliminated from the competition.

| 8 September 2022 Round 2B | Longstone | 0–06 – 0–12 | Mayobridge | Newry |
| 19:30 IST (UTC+1) | | | | Venue: Páirc Esler |
| | | | | Referee: Micheal Moore |

| 8 September 2022 Round 2B | Saul | 3–07 – 0–09 | An Riocht | Ballymartin |
| 19:30 IST (UTC+1) | | | | Venue: Páirc Cois na Farraige |
| | | | | Referee: Brian Higgins |

| 9 September 2022 Round 2B | Bryansford | 0–08 – 0–12 | Clonduff | Newry |
| 19:30 IST (UTC+1) | | | | Venue: Páirc Esler |
| | | | | Referee: Ronan Barry |

| 11 September 2022 Round 2B | Bredagh | 1–03 – 2–07 | Castlewellan | Mayobridge |
| 15:00 IST (UTC+1) | | | | Venue: St Patrick's Park |
| | | | | Referee: Darren O Hare |

=== Relegation Semi-finals ===
The 4 losers of Round 2B play each other in the Relegation Semi-finals. The 2 winners will secure their Senior status for 2023, while the 2 losers will face-off in the Relegation Final.

| 18 September 2022 Relegation Play-Off Semi-final | An Riocht | 0–10 – 4–15 | Bredagh | Drumaness |
| 13:00 IST (UTC+1) | | | | Venue: St Colman's Park |
| | | | | Referee: Peter Owens |

| 18 September 2022 Relegation Play-Off Semi-final | Longstone | 0–06 – 0–10 | Bryansford | Atticall |
| 13:00 IST (UTC+1) | | | | Venue: Holy Cross Park |
| | | | | Referee: Adrian Sharvin |

=== Relegation Final ===
The winner of the Relegation Final will maintain their Senior status into 2023, while the loser will be relegated to the 2023 Down I.F.C.

| 25 September 2022 Relegation Play-Off Final | An Riocht | 0–06 – 2–08 | Longstone | Atticall |
| 13:00 IST (UTC+1) | | | | Venue: Holy Cross Park |
| | | | | Referee: Brendan Rice |

An Riocht relegated to 2023 Down Intermediate Football Championship

== Round 3 ==
Round 3 is a supplementary round for teams to have a second chance at reaching the quarter-finals. This round features teams that have lost once so far in this year's competition, either winning in Round 1 and losing in Round 2A, or losing in Round 1 but winning their Round 2B fixture. The losing teams in this round are eliminated from this year's competition.

This round is seeded, meaning that in each fixture a Round 2A losing team will face a Round 2B winning team.

| 16 September 2022 Round 3 | Glenn | 0–09 – 3–08 | Castlewellan | Ballymartin |
| 19:30 IST (UTC+1) | | | | Venue: Páirc Cois na Farraige |
| | | | | Referee: Brian Higgins |

| 18 September 2022 Round 3 | RGU Downpatrick | 0–06 – 2–05 | Mayobridge | Liatroim |
| 15:00 IST (UTC+1) | | | | Venue: Fontenoy Park |
| | | | | Referee: Brendan Rice |

| 18 September 2022 Round 3 | Ballyholland Harps | 1–12 – 1–13 | Clonduff | Newry |
| 17:00 IST (UTC+1) | | | | Venue: Páirc Esler |
| | | | | Referee: Paul Faloon |

| 19 September 2022 Round 3 | Warrenpoint | 1–11 – 0–07 | Saul | Newry |
| 19:30 IST (UTC+1) | | | | Venue: Páirc Esler |
| | | | | Referee: Darren O Hare |

== Quarter-finals ==
The quarter-finals see the two brackets rejoin, with the earlier Round 2A winners facing a Round 3 winner for a semi-final spot.

| 23 September 2022 Quarter-final | Castlewellan | 0–05 – 1–10 | Loughinisland | Liatroim |
| 19:30 IST (UTC+1) | | | | Venue: Fontenoy Park |
| | | Report | | Referee: Micheal Moore |

| 24 September 2022 Quarter-final | Mayobridge | 0–09 – 0–07 | Carryduff | Castlewellan |
| 16:30 IST (UTC+1) | | | | Venue: St Malachy's Park |
| | | | | Referee: Colm Gribben |

| 25 September 2022 Quarter-final | Clonduff | 1–08 – 0–11 (a.e.t.) (3–4 pen) | Kilcoo | Newry |
| 18:00 IST (UTC+1) | | | | Venue: Páirc Esler |
| | | Report | | Referee: Brian Higgins |
| | | Penalty shootout |

| 26 September 2022 Quarter-final | Warrenpoint | 3–07 – 2–10 (a.e.t.) (5–4 pen) | Burren | Newry |
| 19:15 IST (UTC+1) | | | | Venue: Páirc Esler |
| | | Report | | Referee: Paul Faloon |
| | | Penalty shootout |

== Semi-finals ==
The semi-finals will see the four winning sides face off for a place in this year's final. This round is an open draw from the four quarter-final winners.

| 2 October 2022 Semi-final | Warrenpoint | 0–12 – 0–12 (a.e.t.) (8–7 pen) | Loughinisland | Newry |
| 15:00 IST (UTC+1) | | | | Venue: Páirc Esler |
| | | Report | | Referee: Adrian Sharvin |
| | | Penalty shootout |

| 2 October 2022 Semi-final | Mayobridge | 0–04 – 1–09 | Kilcoo | Newry |
| 19:15 IST (UTC+1) | | | | Venue: Páirc Esler |
| | | Report | | Referee: Paul Faloon |

== Final ==
The final will be played between the two semi-final winning teams, and will take place at Páirc Esler, Newry.

| 16 October 2022 Final | Warrenpoint | 0–15 – 1–13 (a.e.t.) | Kilcoo | Newry |
| 16:00 IST (UTC+1) | | | | Venue: Páirc Esler |
| | | Report | | Referee: Darren O Hare |

== See also ==
- 2022 Down Intermediate Football Championship
