= 2012 Down Senior Football Championship =

Tournament details
- County: Down
- Province: Ulster
- Year: 2012
- Trophy: Frank O'Hare Cup
- Sponsor: Morgan Fuels
- Teams: 16
- Defending champions: Burren

Winners
- Champions: Kilcoo (11th win)
- Qualify for: 2012 Ulster Club SFC

The 2012 Down Senior Football Championship was the 104th official edition of Down GAA's premier Gaelic Football tournament for senior clubs in County Down. 16 teams competed with the winner representing Down in the Ulster Senior Club Football Championship.

Following the conclusion of the 2011 competition, it was voted to change the format of the competition for the first time. From the 2013 edition, a group stage was to be introduced, and 2012 served as a transition season. Initially intended for just one season, the 2012 competition used a double elimination format for the opening two rounds of the championship, with the winners and early round losers rejoining at the quarter final stage. The group stage lasted just two seasons, and Down permanently adopted the double elimination format from 2015 onwards.

St Mary's Burren were the holders after defeating Clonduff in the 2011 final.

== Round 1 ==
The 16 participating teams were placed into an open draw. Winning sides move to Round 2A while losing sides go into Round 2B.

8 June 2012 Round 1	Clonduff	2–06 – 0–06	Rostrevor	Mayobridge
20:00 IST (UTC+1)				Venue: St Patrick's Park

9 June 2012 Round 1	Mayobridge	5–16 – 0–09	Newry Shamrocks	Newry
14:30 IST (UTC+1)				Venue: Páirc Esler

9 June 2012 Round 1	Liatroim Fontenoys	1–08 – 2–09	Saval	Newry
16:00 IST (UTC+1)				Venue: Páirc Esler

9 June 2012 Round 1	Castlewellan	0–13 – 0–03	Loughinisland	Newcastle
17:00 IST (UTC+1)				Venue: St Patrick's Park

9 June 2012 Round 1	Burren	7–15 – 1–09	Kilclief	Newcastle
18:30 IST (UTC+1)				Venue: St Patrick's Park

10 June 2012 Round 1	RGU Downpatrick	3–07 – 2–14	Bryansford	Castlewellan
14:30 IST (UTC+1)				Venue: St Malachy's Park

10 June 2012 Round 1	An Riocht	0–07 – 4–20	Kilcoo	Newry
17:30 IST (UTC+1)				Venue: Páirc Esler

30 June 2012 Round 1	Longstone	1–12 – 1–10	Ballyholland Harps	Newry
19:00 IST (UTC+1)				Venue: Páirc Esler

== Round 2 ==
=== Round 2A ===
Round 2A will feature the eight winning sides from Round 1, with an open draw to determine the fixtures. The winning sides progress directly to the Quarter Final, with the losing sides moving into Round 3.

10 August 2012 Round 2A	Mayobridge	1–13 – 1–10	Saval	Newry
19:00 IST (UTC+1)				Venue: Páirc Esler
				Referee: Oliver Burke

10 August 2012 Round 2A	Longstone	0–12 – 0–13	Burren	Newry
20:30 IST (UTC+1)				Venue: Páirc Esler
				Referee: Martin Rawlinson

12 August 2012 Round 2A	Kilcoo	1–09 – 1–04	Castlewellan	Newry
19:00 IST (UTC+1)				Venue: Páirc Esler
				Referee: Brendan Rice

13 August 2012 Round 2A	Clonduff	2–08 – 2–11	Bryansford	Castlewellan
19:00 IST (UTC+1)				Venue: St Malachy's Park

=== Round 2B ===
Round 2B sees the eight losing sides from Round 1 compete for a place in Round 3. The losing sides from this round will be eliminated from the competition.

11 August 2012 Round 2B	Newry Shamrocks	1–09 – 2–10	An Riocht	Hilltown
14:00 IST (UTC+1)				Venue: Clonduff Park
				Referee: Damian Laverty

11 August 2012 Round 2B	Liatroim Fontenoys	0–09 – 2–07	Ballyholland Harps	Hilltown
15:30 IST (UTC+1)				Venue: Clonduff Park
				Referee: Neil Cousins

11 August 2012 Round 2B	Kilclief	0–09 – 2–23	Rostrevor	Newcastle
17:00 IST (UTC+1)				Venue: St Patrick's Park
				Referee: Kieran Trainor

11 August 2012 Round 2B	RGU Downpatrick	0–11 – 0–03	Loughinisland	Newcastle
18:45 IST (UTC+1)				Venue: St Patrick's Park
				Referee: Gavin Corrigan

== Round 3 ==
Round 3 is a supplementary round for teams to have a second chance at reaching the Quarter Final. This round features teams that have lost once so far in this year's Championship, either winning in Round 1 and losing in Round 2A, or losing in Round 1 but winning their Round 2B fixture. Losing sides in this round are eliminated from this year's competition.

This round is seeded, meaning in each fixture a Round 2A losing side will face a Round 2B winning side.

7 September 2012 Round 3	An Riocht	0–08 – 3–12	Longstone	Newcastle
20:30 IST (UTC+1)				Venue: St Patrick's Park

7 September 2012 Round 3	Clonduff	2–14 – 3–13	Rostrevor	Newry
20:30 IST (UTC+1)				Venue: Páirc Esler

8 September 2012 Round 3	RGU Downpatrick	1–08 – 3–13	Castlewellan	Kilcoo
16:00 IST (UTC+1)				Venue: Páirc Eoghan Rua
		Report

10 September 2012 Round 3	Ballyholland Harps	1–08 – 1–10	Saval	Newry
20:30 IST (UTC+1)				Venue: Páirc Esler

== Quarter Final ==
The Quarter Final sees the two brackets rejoin, with the earlier Round 2A winners facing a Round 3 winner for a Semi Final spot.

28 September 2012 Quarter Final	Mayobridge	0–17 – 1–11	Saval	Newry
19:00 IST (UTC+1)				Venue: Páirc Esler

28 September 2012 Quarter Final	Burren	2–08 – 1–13	Longstone	Newry
20:30 IST (UTC+1)				Venue: Páirc Esler

29 September 2012 Quarter Final	Bryansford	1–10 – 0–08	Rostrevor	Newry
18:00 IST (UTC+1)				Venue: Páirc Esler

29 September 2012 Quarter Final	Kilcoo	0–14 – 0–11	Castlewellan	Newry
19:30 IST (UTC+1)				Venue: Páirc Esler

== Semi Final ==
The Semi Final will see the four winning sides face off for a place in this year's final. This round is an open draw from the four Quarter Final winners.

5 October 2012 Semi Final	Bryansford	0–13 – 1–11	Kilcoo	Newry
20:30 IST (UTC+1)				Venue: Páirc Esler
		Report

7 October 2012 Semi Final	Longstone	1–10 – 4–15	Mayobridge	Newry
18:30 IST (UTC+1)				Venue: Páirc Esler
		Report

== Final ==
The final was played between the two Semi Final winners, and took place at Páirc Esler, Newry.

21 October 2012 Final	Kilcoo	2–08 – 1–08	Mayobridge	Newry
16:00 IST (UTC+1)				Venue: Páirc Esler
		Report		Referee: Ciaran Branagan
