= 2025 Down Intermediate Football Championship =

Gaelic football competition

Tournament details
- County: Down
- Province: Ulster
- Year: 2025
- Trophy: WJ Farrell Cup
- Sponsor: The Parador Lodge
- Teams: 16
- Defending champions: Drumgath

Winners
- Champions: Saval (3rd win)
- Qualify for: Ulster Club IFC

The 2025 Down Intermediate Football Championship is the 37th official edition of Down GAA's secondary Gaelic football tournament for intermediate clubs in County Down. 16 teams competed, with the winning team representing Down in the Ulster Intermediate Club Football Championship. The tournament operated a double elimination format for the opening two rounds of the championship, with the winners and early round losers rejoining at the quarter final stage.

Drumgath won the 2024 edition after defeating Clann na Banna in the final, and as per competition rules, did not defend their title as they qualified to play in the Senior Championship.

== Participating teams ==
The following teams took part in the 2025 edition of the Down Intermediate Football Championship.

Division Two		Division Three		Division Four	
An Riocht	Quarter Final	Annaclone	Final	St Pauls	Round 2B
Longstone	Quarter Final	Atticall	Quarter Final	Teconnaught	Round 2B
Rostrevor	Quarter Final	Ballymartin	Round 2B		
Saval	Champions	Clann na Banna	Semi Final		
St Johns	Semi Final	Darragh Cross	Round 3		
		Dromara	Round 3		
		Newry Shamrocks	Round 3		
		St John Bosco	Round 2B		
		Tullylish	Round 3		

== Round 1 ==
The 16 participating teams were placed into an open draw. The winning teams advance to Round 2A, while losing sides proceed to Round 2B. The games took place over the weekend 21-25 August.

21 August 2025 Round 1	Clann na Banna	2–16 – 2–15	Saval	Drumgath
19:00 IST (UTC+1)				Venue: St Patrick's Park
				Referee: Eddie Cuthbert

21 August 2025 Round 1	Rostrevor	2–28 – 0–09	Ballymartin	Kilkeel
19:00 IST (UTC+1)				Venue: An Ríocht GAC
				Referee: Declan Ryan

22 August 2025 Round 1	Atticall	2–16 – 0–07	St Pauls	Drumnaquoile
19:00 IST (UTC+1)				Venue: Pairc Naomh Eoin
				Referee: Oliver Burke

23 August 2025 Round 1	An Riocht	2–15 – 1–16 (a.e.t.)	Teconnaught	Dundrum
14:00 IST (UTC+1)				Venue: Páirc Sean O'Caoilte
				Referee: Ronan Mc Ateer

23 August 2025 Round 1	Longstone	0–20 – 2–12	Darragh Cross	Newcastle
16:00 IST (UTC+1)				Venue: St Patrick's Park
				Referee: Darren O Hare

24 August 2025 Round 1	St John Bosco	0–08 – 1–17	Newry Shamrocks	Ballyholland
14:00 IST (UTC+1)				Venue: Father Lynch Park
				Referee: Gavin Finnegan

25 August 2025 Round 1	Dromara	2–18 – 1–16	St Johns	Drumaness
19:00 IST (UTC+1)				Venue: St Colman's Park
				Referee: Caolan Mc Ateer

25 August 2025 Round 1	Tullylish	1–13 – 5–12	Annaclone	Glenn
19:00 IST (UTC+1)				Venue: John Martin Park
				Referee: Jake Magill

== Round 2 ==
=== Round 2A ===
Round 2A will feature the eight winning teams from Round 1, with an open draw to determine the fixtures. The winning teams progress directly to the quarter-finals, with the losing teams proceeding to Round 3.

4 September 2025 Round 2A	Dromara	1–12 – 2–14	Annaclone	Saval
18:45 IST (UTC+1)				Venue: Nan Sands Park
				Referee: Darren O Hare

5 September 2025 Round 2A	Atticall	0–12 – 0–09	Clann na Banna	Rostrevor
18:45 IST (UTC+1)				Venue: Pettit Park
				Referee: Neill Cousins

6 September 2025 Round 2A	Longstone	1–11 – 0–13	Rostrevor	Kilkeel
14:00 IST (UTC+1)				Venue: An Ríocht GAC
				Referee: Brian Higgins

7 September 2025 Round 2A	An Riocht	0–21 – 0–13	Newry Shamrocks	Warrenpoint
17:30 IST (UTC+1)				Venue: Páirc Liam Uí hÍr
				Referee: Declan Ryan

=== Round 2B ===
Round 2B sees the eight losing teams from Round 1 compete for a place in Round 3. The losing teams from this round will be eliminated from the competition.

4 September 2025 Round 2B	Teconnaught	0–09 – 0–15	St Johns	Dundrum
19:15 IST (UTC+1)				Venue: Páirc Sean O'Caoilte
				Referee: Christopher Morgan

5 September 2025 Round 2B	Darragh Cross	3–13 – 1–05	St Pauls	Annacloy
18:45 IST (UTC+1)				Venue: Aoibh na Ceanna
				Referee: Karl Brannigan

8 September 2025 Round 2B	Saval	5–13 – 1–09	St John Bosco	Mayobridge
18:45 IST (UTC+1)				Venue: St Patrick's Park
				Referee: David Carr

8 September 2025 Round 2B	Tullylish	3–14 – 1–13	Ballymartin	Glenn
18:45 IST (UTC+1)				Venue: John Martin Park
				Referee: Eddie Cuthbert

=== Relegation Semi-Finals ===
The 4 losers of Round 2B play each other in the Relegation Semi-Finals. The 2 winners will secure their Intermediate status for 2026, while the 2 losers will face-off in the Relegation Final.

20 September 2025 Relegation Play-Off Semi Final	St John Bosco	5–15 – 0–11	Ballymartin	Warrenpoint
13:00 IST (UTC+1)				Venue: Páirc Liam Uí hÍr
				Referee: Brendan Rice

20 September 2025 Relegation Play-Off Semi Final	Teconnaught	6–14 – 0–03	St Pauls	Carryduff
13:00 IST (UTC+1)				Venue: Páirc Aodha Dhuibh
				Referee: Barry Mullan

=== Relegation Final ===
The winner of the Relegation Final will maintain their Intermediate status into 2026, while the loser will be relegated to the 2026 Down J.F.C.

12 October 2025 Relegation Play-Off Final	Ballymartin	2–16 – 0–11	St Pauls	Ballykinlar
13:00 IST (UTC+1)				Venue: Tadhg Barry Memorial Park
				Referee: Ronan Barry

St Pauls relegated to 2026 Down Junior Football Championship

== Round 3 ==
Round 3 is a supplementary round for teams to have a second chance at reaching the quarter-finals. This round features teams that have lost once so far in this year's competition, either winning in Round 1 and losing in Round 2A, or losing in Round 1 but winning their Round 2B fixture. The losing teams in this round are eliminated from this year's competition.

This round is seeded, meaning that in each fixture a Round 2A losing team will face a Round 2B winning team.

13 September 2025 Round 3	Rostrevor	2–18 – 0–05	Tullylish	Saval
17:00 IST (UTC+1)				Venue: Nan Sands Park
				Referee: Darren O Hare

14 September 2025 Round 3	Newry Shamrocks	0–04 – 2–06	St Johns	Mayobridge
13:30 IST (UTC+1)				Venue: St Patrick's Park
				Referee: Jake Magill

14 September 2025 Round 3	Clann na Banna	0–11 – 0–09	Darragh Cross	Carryduff
15:00 IST (UTC+1)				Venue: Páirc Aodha Dhuibh
				Referee: Mark Turley

15 September 2025 Round 3	Dromara	1–13 – 1–15	Saval	Tullylish
19:15 IST (UTC+1)				Venue: Páirc na nÓg
				Referee: Declan Ryan

== Quarter-finals ==
The quarter-finals see the two brackets rejoin, with the earlier Round 2A winners facing a Round 3 winner for a semi-final spot.

19 September 2025 Quarter-final	Annaclone	1–11 – 0–12	Rostrevor	Liatroim
19:30 IST (UTC+1)				Venue: Fontenoy Park
				Referee: Brendan Rice

19 September 2025^{[a]} Quarter-final	Atticall	1–13 – 1–14	St Johns	Kilcoo
19:30 IST (UTC+1)				Venue: Páirc Eoghan Rua
				Referee: Declan Ryan

21 September 2025 Quarter-final	An Riocht	2–11 – 2–15	Saval	Drumgath
13:30 IST (UTC+1)				Venue: St Patrick's Park
				Referee: Ronan Barry

22 September 2025 Quarter-final	Longstone	0–14 – 2–13	Clann na Banna	Liatroim
19:15 IST (UTC+1)				Venue: Fontenoy Park
				Referee: Paul Faloon

27 September 2025 Quarter-final replay	Atticall	0–10 – 0–13	St Johns	Mayobridge
16:00 IST (UTC+1)				Venue: St Patrick's Park

^{a} Game was originally scored as a one point win for St John's, but was overturned on appeal from Atticall and marked as a 1-13 to 1-13 draw, with a replay ordered.

== Semi-finals ==
The semi-finals will see the four winning sides face off for a place in this year's final. This round is an open draw from the four quarter-final winners.

4 October 2025 Semi-final	Saval	3–09 – 2–07	St Johns	Kilcoo
17:00 IST (UTC+1)				Venue: Páirc Eoghan Rua
				Referee: Kevin Mc Grath

5 October 2025 Semi-final	Annaclone	1–11 – 1–11 (a.e.t.)	Clann na Banna	Liatroim
15:00 IST (UTC+1)				Venue: Fontenoy Park
				Referee: Gavin Finnegan

9 October 2025 Semi-final replay	Clann na Banna	2–10 – 2–11	Annaclone	Liatroim
20:00 IST (UTC+1)				Venue: Fontenoy Park
				Referee: Darren O Hare

== Final ==
The final was played between the two semi-final winning teams, and took place at Páirc Esler, Newry.

18 October 2025 Final	Annaclone	0–09 – 3–11	Saval	Newry
				Venue: Páirc Esler
				Referee: Jake Magill
