= Marty Lynch (Gaelic footballer) =

Northern Irish Gaelic footballer (1963–2023

Personal information
- Nickname: Lyncho
- Born: 1963 Newry, County Down, Northern Ireland
- Died: 15 May 2023 (aged 59) Newry; County Down, Northern Ireland
- Height: 6 ft 0 in (183 cm)

Sport
- Sport: Gaelic football
- Position: Corner-back
Clubs
- Years: Club
- Newry Mitchels; Newry Bosco
Club titles
- Down titles: 0
Inter-county
- Years: County
- 1985–1988: Down
Inter-county titles
- Ulster titles: 0
- All-Irelands: 0
- NFL: 0
- All Stars: 0

Martin Lynch (1963 – 15 May 2023) was a Northern Irish athlete, Gaelic footballer and association footballer. At club level he played with Newry Mitchels and Newry Bosco, and also lined out at inter-county level with various Down teams.

== Playing career ==
A noted athlete from his early days, Lynch was an All-Ireland champion runner as a youngster. As a Gaelic footballer, he progressed through the ranks at Newry Mitchels. Lynch first appeared on the inter-county scene with Down as a minor, before captaining the under-21 team to the Ulster U21FC title in 1984.

Lynch was immediately called into the senior team and established himself at corner-back until he stepped away in 1988. After a period away from Gaelic football, he returned with the Newry Bosco club and won a Down IFC medal in 1996.

Lynch also played association football and spent 12 seasons with Newry Celtic, during which time he claimed league titles, the Mid-Ulster Shield, the Bessbrook Cup, the Fr Davis Cup and the Gerard Kennedy Cup. He also had a season with Monaghan United in the League of Ireland.

== Managerial career ==
Lynch's first foray into management was with the Shane O'Neill's club. After guiding the club to promotion from Division Four, he stepped down shortly afterwards following a dispute with the players. Lynch took charge of Newry Mitchels for two years before returning to Shane O'Neill's and guiding the club to Division One status. He later steered the Thomas Davis club to promotion.

== Illness and death ==
Lynch was diagnosed with motor neuron disease in April 2022. He died in Newry on 15 May 2023, at the age of 59.

== Honours ==
Newry Bosco

- Down Intermediate Football Championship: 1996

Down

- Ulster Under-21 Football Championship: 1984 (c)
