= 2011 Down Senior Football Championship =

Tournament details
- County: Down
- Province: Ulster
- Year: 2011
- Trophy: Frank O'Hare Cup
- Sponsor: Morgan Milk
- Teams: 17
- Defending champions: Burren

Winners
- Champions: Burren (13th win)
- Qualify for: 2011 Ulster Club SFC

The 2011 Down Senior Football Championship was the 103rd official edition of Down GAA's premier Gaelic Football tournament for senior clubs in County Down. 17 teams competed with the winner representing Down in the Ulster Senior Club Football Championship.

This was the final season in which a straight knockout format was used.

Also, this was the only time, as of 2026, that an amalgamation team has been entered into the competition. A team made up of Ardglass, Saul and Kilclief played under the banner of ASK Lecale.

St Mary's Burren were the holders after defeating Bryansford in the 2010 final.

== Controversy ==
During the draw made on 24 May 2011 for the preliminary and first round, ASK Lecale were placed automatically into the preliminary round and were drawn to play Saval. The draw proceeded to the end where it was discovered the ball for Tullylish had not been entered into the draw, rendering it null & void. A redraw was carried out on 6 June, pairing the amalgamated team with Longstone.

== Preliminary Round ==
Due to the inclusion of amalgamated side ASK Lecale, a preliminary round was required. An open draw determined their opponents.

| 30 July 2011 Preliminary Round | ASK Lecale | 0–13 – 1–15 | Longstone | Newcastle |
| 17:00 IST (UTC+1) | | | | Venue: St Patrick's Park |
| | | | | Referee: Gavin Corrigan |

== Round 1 ==
The 16 remaining teams were placed into an open draw. Winning sides move to the quarter finals while losing sides were eliminated from the competition.

| 3 August 2011 Round 1 | Rostrevor | 1–11 – 0–11 | RGU Downpatrick | Kilcoo |
| 19:30 IST (UTC+1) | | | | Venue: Páirc Eoghan Rua |
| | | | | Referee: E O'Hare |

| 4 August 2011 Round 1 | Liatroim Fontenoys | 2–05 – 1–14 | Kilcoo | Hilltown |
| 19:30 IST (UTC+1) | | | | Venue: Clonduff Park |
| | | | | Referee: Kieran Trainor |

| 5 August 2011 Round 1 | An Riocht | 1–10 – 1–13 | Bryansford | Mayobridge |
| 19:30 IST (UTC+1) | | | | Venue: St Patrick's Park |
| | | | | Referee: Con Reynolds |

| 6 August 2011 Round 1 | Loughinisland | 1–10 – 0–07 | Tullylish | Castlewellan |
| 19:30 IST (UTC+1) | | | | Venue: St Malachy's Park |
| | | | | Referee: Leo Smyth |

| 7 August 2011 Round 1 | Clonduff | 0–12 – 1–09 | Castlewellan | Kilcoo |
| 15:30 IST (UTC+1) | | | | Venue: Páirc Eoghan Rua |
| | | | | Referee: Brendan Rice |

| 7 August 2011 Round 1 | Saval | 1–09 – 2–12 | Mayobridge | Newry |
| 18:00 IST (UTC+1) | | | | Venue: Páirc Esler |
| | | | | Referee: Ciaran Branagan |

| 7 August 2011 Round 1 | Longstone | Abn. – Abn. | Burren | Newry |
| 19:30 IST (UTC+1) | | | | Venue: Páirc Esler |
| | | | | Referee: Gabriel Tumelty |

| 8 August 2011 Round 1 | Warrenpoint | 2–07 – 2–12 | Ballyholland Harps | Burren |
| 19:30 IST (UTC+1) | | | | Venue: St Mary's Park |
| | | | | Referee: Oliver Burke |

| 17 August 2011 Round 1 Replay | Longstone | 2–11 – 2–14 | Burren | Newry |
| 19:00 IST (UTC+1) | | | | Venue: Páirc Esler |
| | | | | Referee: Con Reynolds |

| 17 August 2011 Round 1 Replay | Castlewellan | 1–12 – 1–13 | Clonduff | Newry |
| 20:30 IST (UTC+1) | | | | Venue: Páirc Esler |
| | | | | Referee: Damien Laverty |

== Quarter Final ==
The Quarter Final sees the first round winners play each other for a semi final spot. An open draw was used for these ties.

| 9 September 2011 Quarter Final | Mayobridge | 1–08 – 1–11 | Burren | Newry |
| 20:30 IST (UTC+1) | | | | Venue: Páirc Esler |
| | | | | Referee: Gavin Corrigan |

| 10 September 2011 Quarter Final | Loughinisland | 0–13 – 3–07 | Clonduff | Downpatrick |
| 17:30 IST (UTC+1) | | | | Venue: Páirc Tomás Ruséil |
| | | | | Referee: Con Reynolds |

| 11 September 2011 Quarter Final | Ballyholland Harps | 0–09 – 2–05 | Rostrevor | Newry |
| 17:00 IST (UTC+1) | | | | Venue: Páirc Esler |
| | | | | Referee: Ciaran Branagan |

| 11 September 2011 Quarter Final | Kilcoo | 1–12 – 0–09 | Bryansford | Newry |
| 18:30 IST (UTC+1) | | | | Venue: Páirc Esler |
| | | | | Referee: Brendan Rice |

== Semi Final ==
The Semi Final will see the four winning sides face off for a place in this year's final. This round is an open draw from the four Quarter Final winners.

| 24 September 2011 Semi Final | Kilcoo | 1–07 – 0–11 | Clonduff | Newry |
| 19:15 IST (UTC+1) | | | | Venue: Páirc Esler |
| | | | | Referee: Gavin Corrigan |

| 25 September 2011 Semi Final | Burren | 1–14 – 0–06 | Rostrevor | Newry |
| 19:00 IST (UTC+1) | | | | Venue: Páirc Esler |
| | | | | Referee: Con Reynolds |

== Final ==
The final was played between the two Semi Final winners, and took place at Páirc Esler, Newry.

| 15 October 2011 Final | Burren | 2–14 – 2–03 | Clonduff | Newry |
| 19:00 IST (UTC+1) | | | | Venue: Páirc Esler |
| | | | | Referee: Brendan Rice |
