= Jamie O'Reilly =

Personal information
- Full name: Jamie O'Reilly
- Born: 28 April 1988 (age 38)
- Original team: Loughinisland (Northern Ireland)
- Draft: 70th overall, 2010 Rookie Draft; Richmond
- Height: 185 cm (6 ft 1 in)
- Weight: 80 kg (176 lb)
- Position: Back pocket

Playing career^{1}
Years	Club	Games (Goals)
2010–2011	Richmond	4 (0)
- ^{1} Playing statistics correct to the end of 2011.

Jamie O'Reilly
Personal information
- Born: County Down
- Occupation: Student
- Height: 6 ft 1 in (185 cm)

Sport
- Sport: Gaelic football
- Position: Center Half Forward
Club
- Years: Club
- 2006-Present: Loughinisland
Inter-county
- Years: County
- 2009-2009: Down
Inter-county titles
- Ulster titles: 2
- All-Irelands: 1
- All Stars: 0

Jamie O'Reilly (born 28 April 1988) is an Irish Gaelic footballer. He was a part of the Down minor team in 2005 when they won the All Ireland and the Down Under 21 team that won Ulster Championships in 2008 and 2009. O'Reilly was part of the Down senior team in 2009. He has also played Australian rules football for the Richmond Football Club in the Australian Football League (AFL).

O'Reilly was drafted to Richmond from Loughinisland in the Down Senior Football Championship in Ireland with the 70th selection in the 2010 Rookie Draft. O'Reilly was the Tigers' first ever "International selection". He made his senior AFL debut in 2010.

In 2011, O'Reilly ended contract renewal negotiations with the Tigers, announcing his intention to instead return to Ireland and Gaelic football.

== Gaelic football ==
O'Reilly was a member of the Down Minor team that won the All-Ireland Minor Football Championship in 2005. He joined the Down Under-21 team in 2008 and they won the Ulster Championship O'Reilly was on the bench in the 3-11 to 1-14 win over Derry that same year Loughinisland made to the County Final in a close game; however he ended up on the losing side after going down 0-13 to 0-09 to Mayobridge who won their fifth title in a row. In 2009, he established himself as a starter on the Down Under-21 team who won back to back Ulster titles beating Armagh 1-14 to 2-10 giving O'Reilly his second Ulster title scoring 0-03 Down made it to the All-Ireland Under-21 Final where they played Cork Down looked to be heading to their first title since 1979 but a lat goal won it for Cork. He came on in Down Ulster Senior Football Championship defeat to Fermanagh he came on the qualifier game. Loughinisland made the 2009 County Final where they played Kilcoo; they led at half time 1-04 to 0-03 but a strong second half display by Kilcoo gave them the title winning 2-09 to 1-04. O'Reilly's brother Ben is a current member of the Down team. Ben was also part of the Down under-21 team in 2009.
