= 2022 Down Intermediate Football Championship =

Gaelic football competition

Tournament details
- County: Down
- Province: Ulster
- Year: 2022
- Trophy: WJ Farrell Cup
- Sponsor: The Parador Lodge
- Teams: 16

Winners
- Champions: Saval (2nd win)
- Qualify for: Ulster Club IFC

Runners-up
- Runners-up: Rostrevor

The 2022 Down Intermediate Football Championship was the 34th official edition of Down GAA's secondary Gaelic football tournament for intermediate clubs in County Down. 16 teams competed, with the winning team representing Down in the Ulster Intermediate Club Football Championship. The tournament operated in a double elimination format for the opening two rounds of the championship, with the winners and early round losers rejoining at the quarterfinal stage.

An Riocht won the 2021 edition after defeating Darragh Cross in the final, and as per competition rules, they did not defend their title as they qualified to play in the Senior Championship.

Saval won the competition for the second time, their first since 1995, after defeating Rostrevor in the final held on 15 October.

== Participating teams ==
The following teams took part in the 2022 edition of the Down Intermediate Football Championship.

Division One
Rostrevor	Final
Division Two
Annaclone	Quarter Final
Darragh Cross	Round 2B
Liatroim Fontenoys	Semi Final
Saval	Champions
St Johns	Semi Final
Division Three
Atticall	Round 3
Aughlisnafin	Round 3
Ballymartin	Quarter Final
Bright	Round 2B
Clann na Banna	Round 3
Drumgath	Quarter Final
Newry Bosco	Round 2B
Newry Shamrocks	Round 3
St Pauls	Round 2B
Tullylish	Quarter Final

== Round 1 ==
The 16 participating teams were placed into an open draw. The winning teams advance to Round 2A, while losing sides proceed to Round 2B.

25 August 2022 Round 1	Clann na Banna	0–16 – 0–13	Annaclone	Mayobridge
19:00 IST (UTC+1)				Venue: St Patrick's Park
				Referee: Micheal Moore

26 August 2022 Round 1	Bright	2–09 – 1–14	Drumgath	Dromara
19:00 IST (UTC+1)				Venue: St Michael's Park
				Referee: John Mc Mullan

27 August 2022 Round 1	Atticall	1–15 – 0–10	Aughlisnafin	Glasdrumman
14:00 IST (UTC+1)				Venue: St Mary's Park
				Referee: Gavin Finnegan

27 August 2022 Round 1	Liatroim Fontenoys	0–10 – 0–13	Rostrevor	Newry
18:00 IST (UTC+1)				Venue: Páirc Esler
				Referee: Darren O Hare

27 August 2022 Round 1	Tullylish	1–10 – 0–10	Darragh Cross	Kilcoo
19:00 IST (UTC+1)				Venue: Páirc Eoghan Rua
				Referee: Mark Turley

28 August 2022 Round 1	Newry Bosco	0–06 – 2–14	Ballymartin	Rostrevor
13:00 IST (UTC+1)				Venue: Pettit Park
				Referee: Kevin Mc Grath

28 August 2022 Round 1	Saval	3–20 – 0–07	St Pauls	Castlewellan
13:00 IST (UTC+1)				Venue: St Malachy's Park
				Referee: Declan Ryan

29 August 2022 Round 1	St Johns	6–08 – 2–11	Newry Shamrocks	Newcastle
19:00 IST (UTC+1)				Venue: St Patrick's Park
				Referee: Christopher Morgan

== Round 2 ==
=== Round 2A ===
Round 2A will feature the eight winning teams from Round 1, with an open draw to determine the fixtures. The winning teams progress directly to the quarter-finals, with the losing teams proceeding to Round 3.

8 September 2022 Round 2A	Clann na Banna	4–11 – 6–15	Rostrevor	Liatroim
19:30 IST (UTC+1)				Venue: Fontenoy Park
				Referee: Peter Owens

10 September 2022 Round 2A	Drumgath	3–13 – 0–10	Atticall	Rostrevor
14:00 IST (UTC+1)				Venue: Pettit Park
				Referee: Declan Ryan

11 September 2022 Round 2A	Tullylish	1–05 – 2–14	Saval	Glenn
13:00 IST (UTC+1)				Venue: John Martin Park
				Referee: David Carr

12 September 2022 Round 2A	Ballymartin	1–13 – 2–12	St Johns	Dundrum
19:00 IST (UTC+1)				Venue: Páirc Sean O'Caoilte
				Referee: Mark Turley

=== Round 2B ===
Round 2B sees the eight losing teams from Round 1 compete for a place in Round 3. The losing teams from this round will be eliminated from the competition.

10 September 2022 Round 2B	Bright	0–08 – 6–16	Newry Shamrocks	Hilltown
14:00 IST (UTC+1)				Venue: Clonduff Park
				Referee: Kevin Mc Grath

10 September 2022 Round 2B	Darragh Cross	1–11 – 0–14 (a.e.t.) (3–4 pen)	Liatroim Fontenoys	Castlewellan
17:00 IST (UTC+1)				Venue: St Malachy's Park
				Referee: Adrian Sharvin
		Penalty shootout

11 September 2022 Round 2B	St Pauls	1–07 – 0–12	Aughlisnafin	Darragh Cross
14:00 IST (UTC+1)				Venue: St Mochai's Park
				Referee: Gavin Finnegan

12 September 2022 Round 2B	Newry Bosco	0–09 – 2–07	Annaclone	Burren
19:00 IST (UTC+1)				Venue: St Mary's Park
				Referee: Eddie Cuthbert

=== Relegation Semi-Finals ===
The 4 losers of Round 2B play each other in the Relegation Semi-Finals. The 2 winners will secure their Intermediate status for 2023, while the 2 losers will face-off in the Relegation Final.

18 September 2022 Relegation Play-Off Semi Final	Bright	2–04 – 1–10	Newry Bosco	Drumnaquoile
13:00 IST (UTC+1)				Venue: Pairc Naomh Eoin
				Referee: Kevin Mc Grath

18 September 2022 Relegation Play-Off Semi Final	St Pauls	0–04 – 4–13	Darragh Cross	Carryduff
13:00 IST (UTC+1)				Venue: Páirc Aodha Dhuibh
				Referee: Mark Turley

=== Relegation Final ===
The winner of the Relegation Final will maintain their Intermediate status into 2023, while the loser will be relegated to the 2023 Down J.F.C.

25 September 2022 Relegation Play-Off Final	Bright	0–11 – 1–16	St Pauls	Darragh Cross
13:00 IST (UTC+1)				Venue: St Mochai's Park
				Referee: Simon Francis

Bright relegated to 2023 Down Junior Football Championship

== Round 3 ==
Round 3 is a supplementary round for teams to have a second chance at reaching the quarter-finals. This round features teams that have lost once so far in this year's competition, either winning in Round 1 and losing in Round 2A, or losing in Round 1 but winning their Round 2B fixture. The losing teams in this round are eliminated from this year's competition.

This round is seeded, meaning that in each fixture a Round 2A losing team will face a Round 2B winning team.

17 September 2022 Round 3	Annaclone	0–13 – 2–06	Atticall	Burren
14:00 IST (UTC+1)				Venue: St Mary's Park
				Referee: Ronan Barry

17 September 2022 Round 3	Newry Shamrocks	1–13 – 1–14	Tullylish	Glenn
15:00 IST (UTC+1)				Venue: John Martin Park
				Referee: Christopher Morgan

17 September 2022 Round 3	Liatroim Fontenoys	1–11 – 0–06	Clann na Banna	Mayobridge
16:30 IST (UTC+1)				Venue: St Patrick's Park
				Referee: Micheal Moore

19 September 2022 Round 3	Aughlisnafin	0–08 – 1–10	Ballymartin	Liatroim
20:00 IST (UTC+1)				Venue: Fontenoy Park
				Referee: Colm Gribben

== Quarter-finals ==
The quarter-finals see the two brackets rejoin, with the earlier Round 2A winners facing a Round 3 winner for a semi-final spot.

23 September 2022 Quarter-final	Rostrevor	3–12 – 2–09 (a.e.t.)	Annaclone	Burren
19:30 IST (UTC+1)				Venue: St Mary's Park
				Referee: Darren O Hare

24 September 2022 Quarter-final	Drumgath	0–13 – 4–12	Liatroim Fontenoys	Saval
17:00 IST (UTC+1)				Venue: Nan Sands Park
				Referee: Ronan Barry

25 September 2022 Quarter-final	Saval	0–13 – 0–11	Tullylish	Glenn
15:30 IST (UTC+1)				Venue: John Martin Park
				Referee: Gavin Finnegan

26 September 2022 Quarter-final	St Johns	2–09 – 2–07	Ballymartin	Kilcoo
19:00 IST (UTC+1)				Venue: Páirc Eoghan Rua
				Referee: Adrian Sharvin

== Semi-finals ==
The semi-finals will see the four winning sides face off for a place in this year's final. This round is an open draw from the four quarter-final winners.

30 September 2022 Semi-final	Liatroim Fontenoys	0–10 – 2–09	Rostrevor	Newry
19:15 IST (UTC+1)				Venue: Páirc Esler
				Referee: Colm Gribben

1 October 2022 Semi-final	Saval	1–10 – 1–08	St Johns	Newry
17:15 IST (UTC+1)				Venue: Páirc Esler
				Referee: Micheal Moore

== Final ==
The final will be played between the two semi-final winning teams, and will take place at Páirc Esler, Newry.

15 October 2022 Final	Rostrevor	1–09 – 1–12	Saval	Newry
17:00 IST (UTC+1)				Venue: Páirc Esler
				Referee: Brian Higgins (Annaclone)
