= Down Intermediate Football Championship =

Gaelic football competition

- Current season or competition: 2026 Down Intermediate Football Championship
- Irish: Cluiche Ceannais Péil An Dúin
- Founded: 1973
- Trophy: WJ Farrell Cup
- Title holders: Rostrevor (2nd title)
- Most titles: Ballyholland Harps; Atticall; Warrenpoint; Drumgath; Saval (3 titles)
- Sponsors: The Parador Lodge

The Down Intermediate Football Championship is an annual Gaelic football competition contested by mid-tier Down GAA clubs. The national media covers the competition.

== Format ==
16 clubs compete in the competition.

== History ==
Bredagh won their maiden title in 2016.

The 2022 final between Rostrevor and Saval pitted Benny Coulter and Danny Hughes (teammates when Down got as far as the 2010 All-Ireland Senior Football Championship Final) against each other on the sideline.

== Honours ==
The winner of the Down IFC qualifies to play in the Down Senior Football Championship. The Down IFC winner also qualifies for the Ulster Intermediate Club Football Championship. It is the only team from Down to qualify for this competition. The Down IFC winner may enter the Ulster Intermediate Club Football Championship at either the preliminary round or the quarter-final stage. They often do well there, with the likes of Rostrevor among the clubs from Down to play in at least one Ulster Championship final after winning the Down Intermediate Football Championship. Liatroim Fontenoys won Ulster in 1998. Warrenpoint won Ulster in 2014. Then Loughlinisland won Ulster in 2015.

The Down IFC winner — by winning the Ulster Intermediate Club Football Championship — may qualify for the All-Ireland Intermediate Club Football Championship, at which it would enter at the semi-final stage, providing it hasn't been drawn to face the British champions in the quarter-finals.

== Finals listed by year ==
Also won the Ulster and All-Ireland competitions in the same season
Also won the Ulster competition in the same season

Year	Winner	Score	Score	Opponents
1973	Greencastle			
1990	Dromara			Ballymartin
1991	Glenn			Drumaness
1992	Drumaness			Ballymartin
1993	Ballymartin			
1994	Ballyholland Harps			Annaclone
1995	Saval			Newry Bosco
1996	Newry Bosco			
1997	Atticall			Annaclone
1998	Liatroim Fontenoys			
1999	Ballyholland Harps			
2000	Atticall			
2001	Warrenpoint			Longstone
2002	Longstone			Saval
2003	Ballyholland Harps			
2004	Atticall			
2005	RGU Downpatrick			
2006	Drumgath			Atticall
2007	RGU Downpatrick	0–12	0–09	Ballymartin
2008	Annaclone	1–13	0–13	Darragh Cross
2009	Ballymartin	0–15	0–07	Darragh Cross
2010	Tullylish	4–07	4–06	Annaclone
2011	Kilclief	1–09	0–09	Ballymartin
2012	Warrenpoint	1–08	0–08	Newry Bosco
2013	Drumgath	0–15	1–07	Newry Bosco
2014	Warrenpoint	1–22	1–09	Ballymartin
2015	Loughinisland	3–11	0–08	An Ríocht
2016	Bredagh	3–13	1–10	An Ríocht
2017	Rostrevor	1–10	1–06	Annaclone
2018	Bredagh	3–13	1–17	Liatroim Fontenoys
2019	Glenn	1–12	1–10	Newry Shamrocks
2020	Saul	3–10	0–14	Drumgath
2021	An Ríocht	2–06	0–11	Darragh Cross
2022	Saval	1–12	1–09	Rostrevor
2023	Liatroim Fontenoys	1–13	1–11	Rostrevor
2024	Drumgath	3–16	0–12	Clann na Banna
2025	Saval	3–11	0–09	Annaclone
2026	Rostrevor	1–15	1–14	An Riocht

== Wins listed by club ==
#	Team	Wins	Years won
1	Ballyholland Harps	3	1994, 1999, 2003
1	Saval	3	1995, 2022, 2025
1	Atticall	3	1997, 2000, 2004
1	Warrenpoint	3	2001, 2012, 2014
1	Drumgath	3	2006, 2013, 2024
6	Glenn	2	1991, 2019
6	Ballymartin	2	1993, 2009
6	Liatroim Fontenoys	2	1998, 2023
6	RGU Downpatrick	2	2005, 2007
6	Bredagh	2	2016, 2018
6	Rostrevor	2	2017, 2026
12	Greencastle	1	1973
12	Dromara	1	1990
12	Drumaness	1	1992
12	Newry Bosco	1	1996
12	Longstone	1	2002
12	Annaclone	1	2008
12	Tullylish	1	2010
12	Kilclief	1	2011
12	Loughinisland	1	2015
12	Saul	1	2020
12	An Ríocht	1	2021
