= 2018 Down Senior Football Championship =

2018 Down S.F.C.
- Season: 2018
- Champions: Burren (14th title)
- Relegated: Glenn John Martin's

The 2018 Down Senior Football Championship was the 110th official edition of Down GAA's premier Gaelic Football tournament for senior clubs in County Down. 16 teams compete with the winner representing Down in the Ulster Senior Club Football Championship.

The tournament operated a double elimination format for the opening two rounds of the championship, with the winners and early round losers rejoining at the quarter-final stage.

Kilcoo Owen Roe's were the defending champions after they defeated Burren 0–13 to 0–11 in the 2017 final.

Rostrevor return to the senior grade after claiming the Down I.F.C. title in 2017. Carryduff make their senior return after breaking into the top 15 ranked teams (3rd in Division 2 - ranked 15th overall) in the Down football leagues for 2017.

On 14 October 2018 Burren spurned Kilcoo's hopes for 7-in-a-row of Down S.F.C. titles when defeating them in the final at Páirc Esler by 2–12 to 2-9 and claiming their 14th S.F.C. triumph in the process.

Glenn John Martin's were relegated to the 2019 I.F.C. after finishing outside the top 15 ranked teams in the Down football leagues for 2018. They finished 5th (ranked 17th overall) in Division 2. Bredagh will replace them after they claimed the 2018 Down I.F.C. title.

== Team changes ==
The following teams have changed division since the 2017 championship season.

=== To S.F.C. ===
Promoted from 2017 Down Intermediate Football Championship

- Rostrevor - (I.F.C. Champions; ranked 14th overall in Down F.L.)
- Carryduff - (IFL Champions; ranked 15th overall in Down F.L.)h h

=== From S.F.C. ===
Relegated to 2018 Down Intermediate Football Championship

- Ballymartin - (9th in Div. 2 F.L.; ranked 21st overall in Down F.L.)
- Bredagh - (5th in Div. 2 F.L.; ranked 17th overall in Down F.L.)

== Round 1 ==
All 16 teams enter the competition in this round. The 8 winners progress to Round 2A while the 8 losers progress to Round 2B.

- Saval 3-15, 1-17 Clonduff, 9/8/2018,
- Carryduff 2-10, 0-11 Ballyholland, 10/8/2018,
- Mayobridge 2-13, 0-7 An Ríocht, 10/8/2018,
- Kilcoo 2-9, 0-9 Bryansford, 11/8/2018,
- Castlewellan 0-9, 0-5 Longstone, 11/8/2018,
- Glenn John Martin's 1-7, 0-7 RGU Downpatrick, 12/8/2018,
- Warrenpoint 0-16, 0-10 Rostrevor, 12/8/2018,
- Burren 1-11, 0-11 Loughinisland, 12/8/2018,

== Round 2 ==
=== Round 2A ===
The 8 winning teams from Round 1 enter this round. The 4 winners enter the draw for the quarter-finals while the 4 losers play in Round 3.

- Kilcoo 2-14, 0-12 Castlewellan, 17/8/2018,
- Mayobridge 3-8, 0-11 Saval, 17/8/2018,
- Burren 1-17, 0-11 Carryduff, 18/8/2018,
- Warrenpoint 1-16, 1-12 Glenn John Martin's, 18/8/2018,

=== Round 2B ===
The 8 losing teams from Round 1 enter this round. The 4 winners go into Round 3 while the 4 losing teams exit the championship.

- RGU Downpatrick 4-19, 0-4 An Ríocht, 16/8/2018,
- Clonduff 0-10, 0-6 Ballyholland, 16/8/2018,
- Loughinisland 2-8, 1-10 Longstone, 20/8/2018,
- Bryansford 1-15, 1-13 Rostrevor, 20/8/2018,

== Round 3 ==
This is the final qualifier round. The four losing teams from round 2A (who won a match and lost a match) play the four winning teams from round 2B (who lost a match and won a match).

- RGU Downpatrick 1-10, 2-6 Glenn John Martin's, 23/8/2018,
- Clonduff 2-15, 0-9 Saval, 24/8/2018,
- Loughinisland 1-8, 0-9 Carryduff, 27/8/2018,
- Castlewellan 2-11, 1-13 Bryansford, 27/8/2018,

== Quarter-finals ==
The 4 winners from Round 2A play the 4 winners from Round 3.

- Mayobridge 2-16, 2-15 Clonduff, 7/9/2018,
- Kilcoo 2-14, 0-10 RGU Downpatrick, 8/9/2018,
- Burren 0-10, 0-7 Castlewellan, 9/9/2018,
- Warrenpoint 0–9, 0-9 Loughinisland, 10/9/2018,
- Warrenpoint 0-18, 1-12 Loughinisland, 15/9/2018, (Replay),

== Semi-finals ==
28 September 2018; 20:15	Burren	5-12 - 2-11	Mayobridge	Pairc Esler; Referee: Paul Faloon

29 September 2018; 19:00	Kilcoo	1-14 - 2-6	St. Peter's Warrenpoint	Pairc Esler; Referee: Ronan Barry

== Final ==
14 October 2018; 4:00 pm Final	Burren	2-12 - 2-9	Kilcoo	Páirc Esler; Attendance: 6,526; Referee: Con Reynolds
