= John Mitchel GFC =

- Mistéiligh an Iúir
- Founded: 1956
- County: Down
- Colours: Red and White
- Grounds: Gerry Brown Park
- Coordinates: 54°09′11″N 6°19′26″W

Playing kits
Standard colours

Senior Club Championships
	All Ireland	Ulster champions	Down champions
Football:	0	0	4

John Mitchel GFC is a Gaelic Athletic Association club based in Newry, County Down, Northern Ireland. Established in 1956, it is named after the Irish patriot John Mitchel. The club has won the Down Senior Football Championship four times, winning its first in 1960 and repeating the feat three more times in that decade in 1964, 1967 and 1968. Newry Mitchels forward Seán O'Neill also won 3 All-Ireland Senior Football Championships with Down in the 1960s and was picked on the Gaelic Athletic Association's teams of the Century and Millennium.

Mitchels home pitch is Gerry Brown Park, Greenbank. The grounds are named after Gerry Brown, founding member. He managed the Down Senior football team to All-Ireland success in 1968. The club also has club rooms in Kilmorey street, on the County Down side of Newry.

As of 2001, Mitchels were playing in the Down Junior Championship. The club colours are red and white.

== Honours ==
- Down Senior Football Championship (4): 1960, 1964, 1967, 1968
- Down Junior Football Championship (2): 1978, 2001

== Notable players ==
- D. J. Kane
- Seán O'Neill

== See also ==
- List of Gaelic Athletic Association clubs
