= Ballela =

Village in County Down, Northern Ireland

Coordinates: 54.354°N 6.149°W

Ballela: Irish: Baile Aileach; Ballela
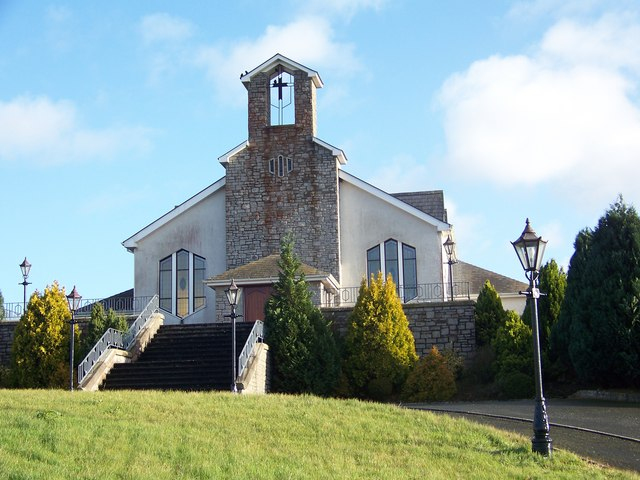
- Ballela Catholic church

- Location within County Down
- Population: 90 (2011 census)
- Irish grid reference: J2046
- District: Banbridge
- County: County Down
- Country: Northern Ireland
- Sovereign state: United Kingdom
- Post town: BANBRIDGE
- Postcode district: BT32
- Dialling code: 028
- UK Parliament: South Down
- NI Assembly: South Down

Ballela is a small village and parish in County Down, Northern Ireland. It is about 5 miles (8.0 km) east of Banbridge, located on top of one of the many drumlins that are common in the county. There are a number of prehistoric ringforts near the village.

== Name ==
Ballela is within the townland of Ballooly, which was historically spelt as Ballyely. It is believed that these three names all come from Irish Baile Ailigh, meaning 'settlement of the stony place'.

== Sport ==
Gaelic games have been played in the Ballela area for some time, and hurling was first played in the area in 1901. The first County Down Senior Hurling Championship win for Ballela Hurling and Camogie Club (Baile Aileach Cumann Lúthchleas Gael) came in the 1936 final played in Castlewellan against Kilclief. Further titles were won in 1937, 1940, 1941, 1948, 1951 and 1952. New playing fields, meeting rooms and changing facilities were developed during 2005 and the pitch was officially opened in 2007.

The club, which won the county junior championship in 2015, is among the most successful Down hurling clubs and has the fifth most senior county hurling titles behind Portaferry and followed by Leitrim Fontenoys.

== Education ==
A National School that existed at Ballela in 1837 was described as "a small cottage" with 100 Catholic and 10 Presbyterian pupils. A new school in the townland of Shanrod was opened in 1859 and extended in 1861. It became the Catholic school for Ballela for several generations. A new school at Ballela was opened in September 1969 and shut in June 2006. It was between the curate's house and the Parochial Hall.
