= Down Senior Football Championship =

Gaelic football competition

- Current season or competition: 2026 Down Senior Football Championship
- Irish: Cluiche Ceannais Péil An Dúin
- Founded: 1903
- Trophy: Frank O'Hare Cup
- Title holders: Clonduff (10th title)
- Most titles: Kilcoo (23 titles)
- Sponsors: Morgan Fuels

The Down Senior Football Championship is an annual Gaelic football competition contested by top-tier Down GAA clubs. The Down County Board of the Gaelic Athletic Association has organised it since 1903.

Clonduff are the title holders (2026) defeating Burren in the Final.

== History ==
Since the turn of the Millennium, the competition and Down football has largely been dominated by the "Big Three", with 21 of the 23 titles being shared by Kilcoo (11 titles), Mayobridge (7) and Burren (St Mary's) (3). Clonduff in 2000 and 2026 and Bryansford in 2003 are the only other 2 teams to win a senior championship this century.

== Honours ==
The trophy presented to the winners is the Frank O'Hare Cup. The winners of the Down Senior Championship qualify to represent their county in the Ulster Senior Club Football Championship. The winners can, in turn, go on to play in the All-Ireland Senior Club Football Championship.

== Finals listed by year ==
(r) = replay

Also won the Ulster and All-Ireland competitions in the same season
Also won the Ulster competition in the same season

Year	Winner	Score	Score	Opponents
1903	Faugh-a-Ballagh			Liatroim Fontenoys
1904	Clann na Banna	1-02	0-04	Faugh-a-Ballagh
1905	Liatroim Fontenoys			Faugh-a-Ballagh
1906	Faugh-a-Ballagh	0-07	0-04	Liatroim Fontenoys
1907	Faugh-a-Ballagh			Liatroim Fontenoys
1908	Rory Og, Annsborough	0-11	0-01	Faugh-a-Ballagh
1909	Faugh-a-Ballagh	2-00	1-00	Ballyvarley
1910	Clann Uladh	2-01	1-01	Ballyvarley
1911	No competition			
1912	No competition			
1913	No competition			
1914	No competition			
1915	No competition			
1916	Liatroim Fontenoys			Clan Na Gael, Downpatrick
1917	Kilcoo			Killyleagh
1918	Mayobridge			Liatroim Fontenoys
1919	Mayobridge	1-02	1-01	Liatroim Fontenoys
1920	Liatroim Fontenoys	0-02	0-01	Rossglass
1921	Kilcoo			Rossglass
1922	Rossglass	0-03	0-01	Kilcoo
1923	No competition			
1924	Castlewellan	1-12	0-02	Mayobridge
1925	Kilcoo	2-03	0-01	Rathfriland
1926	Kilcoo	0-03	0-02	Clonduff
1927	Kilcoo	0-11	0-00	Mayobridge
1928	Kilcoo	1-06	1-04	Clonduff
1929	Drumnaquoile	2-02	1-01	Mayobridge
1930	Clonduff	1-03	1-01	Mayobridge
1931	Rathfriland			Rossglass
1932	Kilcoo	2-06	0-03	Rossglass
1933	Kilcoo			
1934†	Castlewellan	1-03; 2-05	1-03; 0-01	Ballymartin
1935	St Patrick's, Downpatrick	3-01	0-08	Kilcoo
1936	Castlewellan	0-06; 1-04	1-03; 0-03	Mayobridge
1937	Kilcoo			Mayobridge
1938	Ballymartin	2-01	1-01	Saul
1939	Bryansford	1-05	1-01	Saul
1940	Bryansford	3-04	2-02	Kilcoo
1941	Bryansford	0-12	0-10	Warrenpoint
1942	Bryansford	1-09	2-04	Shamrocks
1943	Warrenpoint	3-03	1-03	Bryansford
1944	Clonduff	1-10	1-06	Warrenpoint
1945	Clonduff	1-07	0-00	Castlewellan
1946	Newry	1-03	1-01	Castlewellan
1947	Clonduff	3-07	0-05	Shamrocks
1948	Warrenpoint	4-01	1-05	Kilcoo
1949	Clonduff	1-08	2-02	Saul
1950	Castlewellan	2-05	2-04	Warrenpoint
1951	Shamrocks	3-02	1-06	Kilkeel
1952	Clonduff	2-09	1-09	Castlewellan
1953	Warrenpoint	1-00	0-01	Burren (St Mary's)
1954	Lisnacree	2-04	0-04	Annaclone
1955	Ballymartin	4-08	0-05	Longstone
1956	Shamrocks	2-06	0-05	Kilwarlin
1957	Clonduff	3-04	1-03	Cabra Harps
1958	Castlewellan	0-08	0-04	Clonduff
1959	Glenn	3-04	0-05	St Bronagh's, Rostrevor
1960	Newry Mitchels	2-10	1-04	Ballykinlar
1961	Shamrocks	1-11	2-06	Newry Mitchels
1962	Glenn	1-12	0-04	Castlewellan
1963	Glenn	0-07	0-05	Russell Gaelic Union, Downpatrick
1964	Newry Mitchels	4-02	1-10	Ballykinlar
1965	Castlewellan	3-10	1-09	Clonduff
1966	Burren (St Mary's)	1-10	1-05	St Michael's
1967	Newry Mitchels	1-09	1-06	Russell Gaelic Union, Downpatrick
1968	Newry Mitchels	3-07	2-03	Bryansford
1969	Bryansford	1-11	1-06	Burren (St Mary's)
1970	Bryansford	3-11	0-04	Burren (St Mary's)
1971	Bryansford	2-12	1-07	Tullylish
1972	Russell Gaelic Union, Downpatrick	2-05	0-08	Loughinisland
1973	Bryansford	0-16	1-07	Loughinisland
1974	Bryansford	3-05	0-08	Loughinisland
1975	Loughinisland	1-07	0-09	St Bronagh's, Rostrevor
1976	St Bronagh's, Rostrevor	1-09	1-05	Warrenpoint
1977	Bryansford	3-09	2-05	Burren (St Mary's)
1978	Russell Gaelic Union, Downpatrick	0-11	1-06	Warrenpoint
1979	Castlewellan	2-10	1-04	St Bronagh's, Rostrevor
1980	Clonduff	0-07	1-03	Saval
1981	Burren (St Mary's)	1-10	2-06	Glenn
1982	Castlewellan	2-05	1-05	Clonduff
1983	Burren (St Mary's)	0-09	0-04	Clonduff
1984	Burren (St Mary's)	3-14	0-05	An Ríocht
1985	Burren (St Mary's)	0-10	0-05	Loughinisland
1986	Burren (St Mary's)	0-13	0-07	Longstone
1987	Burren (St Mary's)	0-12	1-06	Bryansford
1988	Burren (St Mary's)	1-10	0-07	Loughinisland
1989	Loughinisland	3-10	0-05	Bryansford
1990	Russell Gaelic Union, Downpatrick	0-12	1-05	Burren (St Mary's)
1991	Russell Gaelic Union, Downpatrick	1-07	1-05	Castlewellan
1992	Burren (St Mary's)	4-07	1-06	St Bronagh's, Rostrevor
1993	Russell Gaelic Union, Downpatrick	3-06	0-08	Bryansford
1994	Castlewellan	1-09	0-08	Russell Gaelic Union, Downpatrick
1995	Castlewellan	1-08	0-10	Russell Gaelic Union, Downpatrick
1996	Burren (St Mary's)	0-15	1-07	Bryansford
1997	Burren (St Mary's)	2-10	0-12	Clonduff
1998	St Bronagh's, Rostrevor	1-11	0-11	Mayobridge
1999	Mayobridge	0-14	0-08	Burren (St Mary's)
2000	Clonduff	1-17	0-11	Liatroim Fontenoys
2001	Mayobridge	0-15	1-09	Castlewellan
2002	Mayobridge	2-14	0-09	St Bronagh's, Rostrevor
2003	Bryansford	1-08	0-09	Mayobridge
2004	Mayobridge	4-12	0-08	Annaclone
2005	Mayobridge	0-13	0-07	Bryansford
2006	Mayobridge	1-10	0-04	Burren (St Mary's)
2007	Mayobridge	0-16; 1-08 (r)	1-13; 0-09 (r)	Longstone
2008	Mayobridge	0-12	0-08	Loughinisland
2009	Kilcoo	2-09	1-04	Loughinisland
2010	Burren (St Mary's)	1-14	1-13	Bryansford
2011	Burren (St Mary's)	2-14	2-03	Clonduff
2012	Kilcoo	2-08	1-08	Mayobridge
2013	Kilcoo	0-09	0-07	Burren (St Mary's)
2014	Kilcoo	4-12	2-07	Burren (St Mary's)
2015	Kilcoo	3-10	0-11	Castlewellan
2016	Kilcoo	3-11	0-09	Clonduff
2017	Kilcoo	0-13	0-11	Burren (St Mary's)
2018	Burren (St Mary's)	2-12	2-09	Kilcoo
2019	Kilcoo	1-12	0-14	Warrenpoint
2020	Kilcoo	0-16	0-09	Carryduff
2021	Kilcoo	1-12	0-13	Burren (St Mary's)
2022	Kilcoo	1-13 after extra time	0-15 after extra time	Warrenpoint
2023	Kilcoo	2-12	0-09	Burren (St Mary's)
2024	Kilcoo	1-10	0-04	Burren (St Mary's)
2025	Kilcoo	1-17	1-11	Carryduff
2026	Clonduff	1-14	1-10	Burren (St Mary’s)

Notes

† The 1934 replay was abandoned. Castlewellan were awarded the title.

== Winners and runners-up listed by club ==
#	Team	Wins	Runners-up	Years won	Years Runners-Up
1	Kilcoo	23	5	1917, 1921, 1925, 1926, 1927, 1928, 1932, 1933, 1937, 2009, 2012, 2013, 2014, 2015, 2016, 2017, 2019, 2020, 2021, 2022, 2023, 2024, 2025	1922, 1935, 1940, 1948, 2018
2	Burren (St Mary's)	14	13	1966, 1981, 1983, 1984, 1985, 1986, 1987, 1988, 1992, 1996, 1997, 2010, 2011, 2018	1953, 1969, 1970, 1977, 1990, 1999, 2006, 2013, 2014, 2017, 2021, 2023, 2024, 2026
3	Bryansford	11	8	1939, 1940, 1941, 1942, 1969, 1970, 1971, 1973, 1974, 1977, 2003	1943, 1968, 1987, 1989, 1993, 1996, 2005, 2010
4	Castlewellan	10	7	1924, 1934, 1936, 1950, 1958, 1965, 1979, 1982, 1994, 1995	1945, 1946, 1952, 1962, 1991, 2001, 2015
4	Mayobridge	10	9	1918, 1919, 1999, 2001, 2002, 2004, 2005, 2006, 2007, 2008	1924, 1927, 1929, 1930, 1936, 1937, 1998, 2003, 2012
4	Clonduff	10	10	1930, 1944, 1945, 1947, 1949, 1952, 1957, 1980, 2000, 2026	1926, 1928, 1958, 1965, 1982, 1983, 1997, 2011, 2016
7	Russell Gaelic Union, Downpatrick	6	4	1935, 1972, 1978, 1990, 1991, 1993	1963, 1967, 1994, 1995
8	Faugh-a-Ballagh	4	3	1903, 1906, 1907, 1909	1904, 1905, 1908
8	Newry Mitchels	4	1	1960, 1964, 1967, 1968	1961
10	Liatroim Fontenoys	3	6	1905, 1916, 1920	1903, 1906, 1907, 1918, 1919, 2000
10	Warrenpoint	3	7	1943, 1948, 1953	1941, 1944, 1950, 1976, 1978, 2019, 2022
10	Newry Shamrocks	3	2	1951, 1956, 1961	1942, 1947
10	Glenn	3	1	1959, 1962, 1963	1981
14	Loughinisland	2	7	1975, 1989	1972, 1973, 1974, 1985, 1988, 2008, 2009,
14	St Bronagh's, Rostrevor	2	5	1976, 1998	1959, 1975, 1979, 1992, 2002
14	Ballymartin	2	1	1938, 1955	1934
17	Rossglass	1	4	1922	1920, 1921, 1931, 1932
17	Rathfriland	1	1	1931	1925
17	Lisnacree	1	0	1954	-
17	Newry	1	0	1946	-
17	Drumnaquoile	1	0	1929	-
17	Clann Uladh	1	0	1910	-
17	Clann na Banna	1	0	1904	-
17	Rory Óg Annsb.	1	0	1908	-
25	Longstone	0	3		
25	Saul	0	3		
25	Ballyvarley	0	2		
25	Annaclone	0	2		
25	Ballykinlar	0	2		
25	Saval	0	1		
25	St Michael's	0	1		
25	Tullylish	0	1		
25	Kilwarlin	0	1		
25	Cabra Harps	0	1		
25	Kilkeel	0	1		
25	Killyleagh	0	1		
25	An Ríocht	0	1		
25	Carryduff	0	2		
