= Atticall =

Village in County Down, Northern Ireland

Coordinates: 54.109°N 6.044°W

Attical: Irish: Áit Tí Chathail
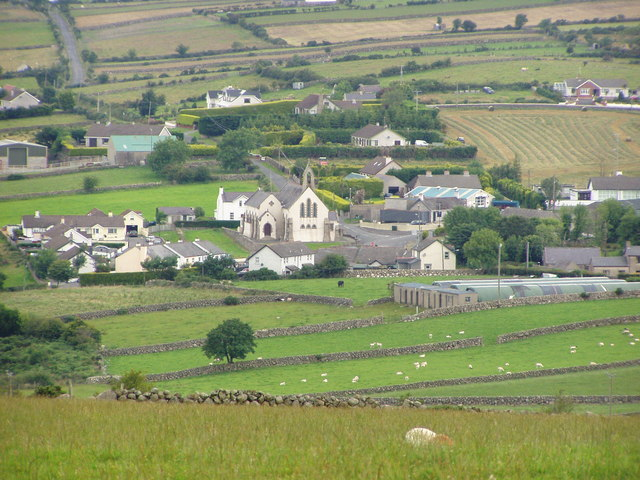
- Attical from Aughrim Hill in 2007

- Location within County Down
- County: County Down
- Country: Northern Ireland
- Sovereign state: United Kingdom
- Postcode district: BT34

Attical or Atticall (from Irish Áit Tí Chathail, meaning 'place of Cathal's house') is a small village and townland (of 396 acres) in the Mourne Mountains of County Down, Northern Ireland. It is situated in the civil parish of Kilkeel and the historic barony of Mourne. In the 2021 census it had a population of 168 people. It lies within the Newry and Mourne District Council area.

The village has a Catholic maintained primary school, called Holy Cross, for 4–11 year olds. There is a Roman Catholic church, a shop and a Gaelic football club. The Cnocnafeola Cultural and Residential Centre offers accommodation for trekkers and visitors to the Mournes. The village is also home to the Holy Cross Accordion Band, which has won All Ireland Fleadh Cheoil na hÉireann competitions on six occasions: 2010, 2011, 2014, 2016, 2017 and 2018. They were also crowned All Ireland Junior Fleadh Cheoil na hÉireann champions in 2016.

== Geography ==
At the end of the ice age a deposit of stones is thought to have been left that runs through Atticall. This is known locally as the Stoney Rigg. The remains of this can be seen on Slieve Muck, and it is said to flow down to Green Castle.

The great spotted woodpecker, Ireland's newest breeding bird species, has been seen in Cnocnafeola Wood.

== See also ==
- List of towns and villages in Northern Ireland
- List of townlands in County Down
