= Annacloy =

Village and townland in Northern Ireland

Coordinates: 54°21′23″N 5°45′49″W

Annacloy: Irish: Áth na Cloiche
- Location within County Down
- County: County Down
- Country: Northern Ireland
- Sovereign state: United Kingdom
- Postcode district: BT
- Dialling code: 028

Annacloy (believed to derive from Irish Áth na Cloiche 'ford of the stone') is a village and townland in County Down, Northern Ireland. The townland has an area of 1152.7 acres (4.67 km^{2}). The townland is situated in the civil parish of Inch and the historic barony of Lecale Lower, located 3.5 miles north-west of Downpatrick. It lies within the Newry, Mourne and Down District Council. The village of Annacloy is located just outside the townland despite sharing a name, they are separated by the Annacloy River, the village being situated in the townland of Rossconor, the civil parish of Kilmore and the historic barony of Kinelarty. The village is centred on the Annacloy Road at a crossroad.

== See also ==
- List of townlands in County Down
