= Drumaness =

Village in County Down, Northern Ireland

Coordinates: 54.3683°N 5.8525°W

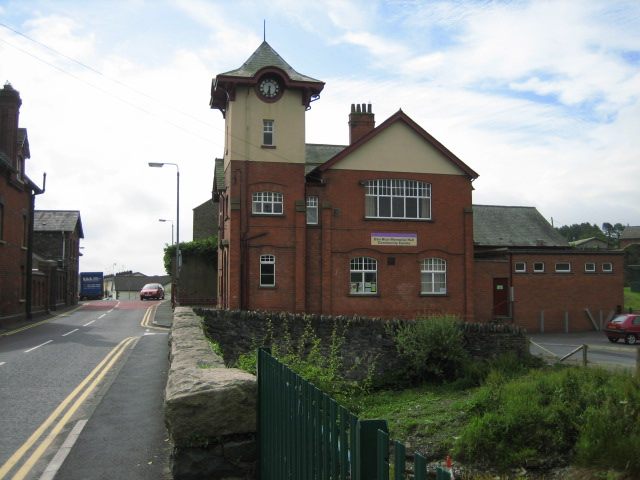
- Dan Rice Memorial Hall Community Centre

- Location within County Down
- Population: 1,309 (2021 census)
- District: Newry, Mourne and Down
- County: County Down
- Country: Northern Ireland
- Sovereign state: United Kingdom
- Post town: BALLYNAHINCH
- Postcode district: BT24
- Dialling code: 028
- UK Parliament: South Down
- NI Assembly: South Down

Drumaness (formerly Drumanessy; from Irish Droim an Easa, meaning 'ridge of the waterfall') is a village and townland (of 761 acres) in the Newry, Mourne and Down District Council area of County Down, Northern Ireland. It is 3 miles or 5 kilometres south of Ballynahinch, beside the main A24 Belfast to Newcastle road. It is situated in the civil parish of Magheradroll and the historic barony of Kinelarty. In the 2021 census it had a population of 1,309 people.

== Demography ==
The population of Drumaness on census day 2011 was 1339 people. The demographic characteristics of the people living in Drumaness was as follows:

- 22.93% were aged under 16 years;
- 10.53% were aged 65 and over; the average age was 32 years (median);
- 48.24% of the population were male and 51.76% were female;
- 88.72% were from a Catholic community background;
- 7.84% were from a 'Protestant and Other Christian (including Christian related)' community
- 26.29% indicated that they had a British national identity, 36.52% had an Irish national identity and 40.70% had a Northern Irish national identity

== History and development ==
Drumaness developed as a mill village in 1850, with the opening of a spinning mill on the banks of the River Cumber. The mill, which was the village's main employer, closed in 1968. Today it is largely a commuter settlement which contains a limited range of services and shops. Christ The King Catholic Primary School and the Church of Christ the King are situated on the Drumsnade Road on the opposite side of the Newcastle Road, approximately a quarter or a mile or 0.5 kilometres south west of the village.

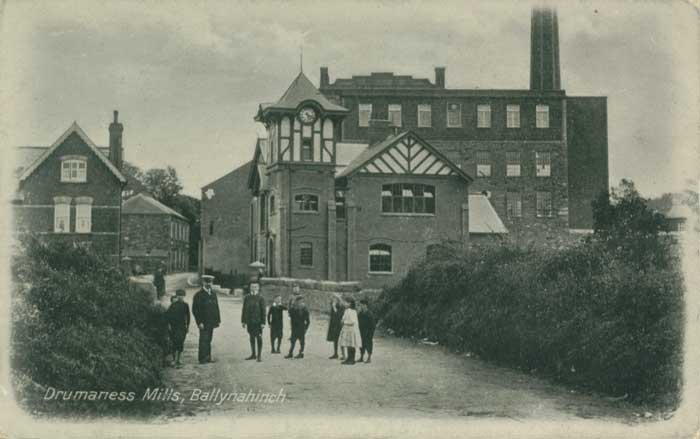
Drumaness in the early 1900s showing the Dan Rice Hall

The centre of the village has a number of listed terraces of mill buildings, alleyways, courtyards and a millpond. The Dan Rice Memorial Hall, now used as a community centre, is a listed building. Cumber Bridge Orange Hall (LOL 808) was on Cumber Road but has been demolished.

== Sport ==
Former world champion MMA Fighter Paul McVeigh started his martial arts with Down Community Jujitsu Clubs in Drumaness. Down Community JuJitsu Clubs (DCJJC) were first opened on 6 January 1999, by sensei Gerald McAlister who won the Irish MMA championship in 2000. DCJJC are members of the Cobra Martial Arts Association (CMAA).

Drumaness is in the Parish of Magheradroll. There is evidence of Gaelic football being played in the parish as far back as 1889 when a club was in existence in Glassdrummond, on the Belfast side of Ballynahinch. A club was formed in Ballynahinch in 1935 and continued until it moved to Drumaness in February 1957, where it has remained ever since, as St. Colman's Drumaness (Irish: Naomh Cholmain Droim an Easa). Down All-Ireland-winning footballer Peter Withnell is a native of Drumaness.

Drumaness Mills F.C. are a local football club playing in the NAFL Premier Division of the Northern Amateur Football League.

Drumaness SuperKings Cricket Club plays in the NCU Senior League.

== People ==
- Amanda McKittrick Ros, the writer, was born in Drumaness (b. 1860 - d. 1939).
