= Loughinisland GAC =

Gaelic football club from County Down

- Loch an Oileáin CLG
- Founded: 1906
- County: Down
- Colours: Blue and White
- Grounds: Macartan Park, Teconnaught Road, Loughinisland

Playing kits
Standard colours

Senior Club Championships
	All Ireland	Ulster champions	Down champions
Football:	0	0	2

Loughinisland is a Gaelic football club based in the village of Loughinisland, County Down, Northern Ireland.

== History ==
The club was founded in 1906. Their first championship success was in 1954, winning the Junior Championship, and won it again in 1958.

Loughinisland lost three county finals in a row from 1972 to 1974, before winning their first Senior Championship in 1975, beating Rostrevor in the final. The club reached further county finals in 1985 and 1988, losing to Burren. The club's second county title was won in 1989, beating Bryansford in the final. The club didn't reach another county final until 2008, losing to Mayobridge. They were back in the county final again in 2009, but lost once again, this time to Kilcoo.

The club's first Intermediate title was won in 2015, beating An Ríocht in the final. The club went on to reach the Ulster Intermediate final where they faced Réalt na Mara of Bundoran. Loughinisland won the match on the bizarre scoreline of 4–1 to 0–7.

== Honours ==
- Down Senior Football Championship: 2
  - 1975, 1989
- Ulster Intermediate Club Football Championship: 1
  - 2015
- Down Intermediate Football Championship: 1
  - 2015
- Down Junior Football Championship: 2
  - 1954, 1958
