= Drumgath GAC =

Gaelic football club in County Down

St Patrick's, Drumgath
- Cumann Naomh Pádraig Droim Ga An Dún
- Founded: 1960
- County: Down
- Colours: Maroon and white
- Grounds: St Patrick’s Park
- Coordinates: 54°13′48″N 6°12′54″W

Playing kits
Standard colours

Drumgath Gaelic Athletic Club, also called St Patrick's Club, Drumgath, is a Gaelic football club based near Rathfriland, County Down, Northern Ireland.

== History ==
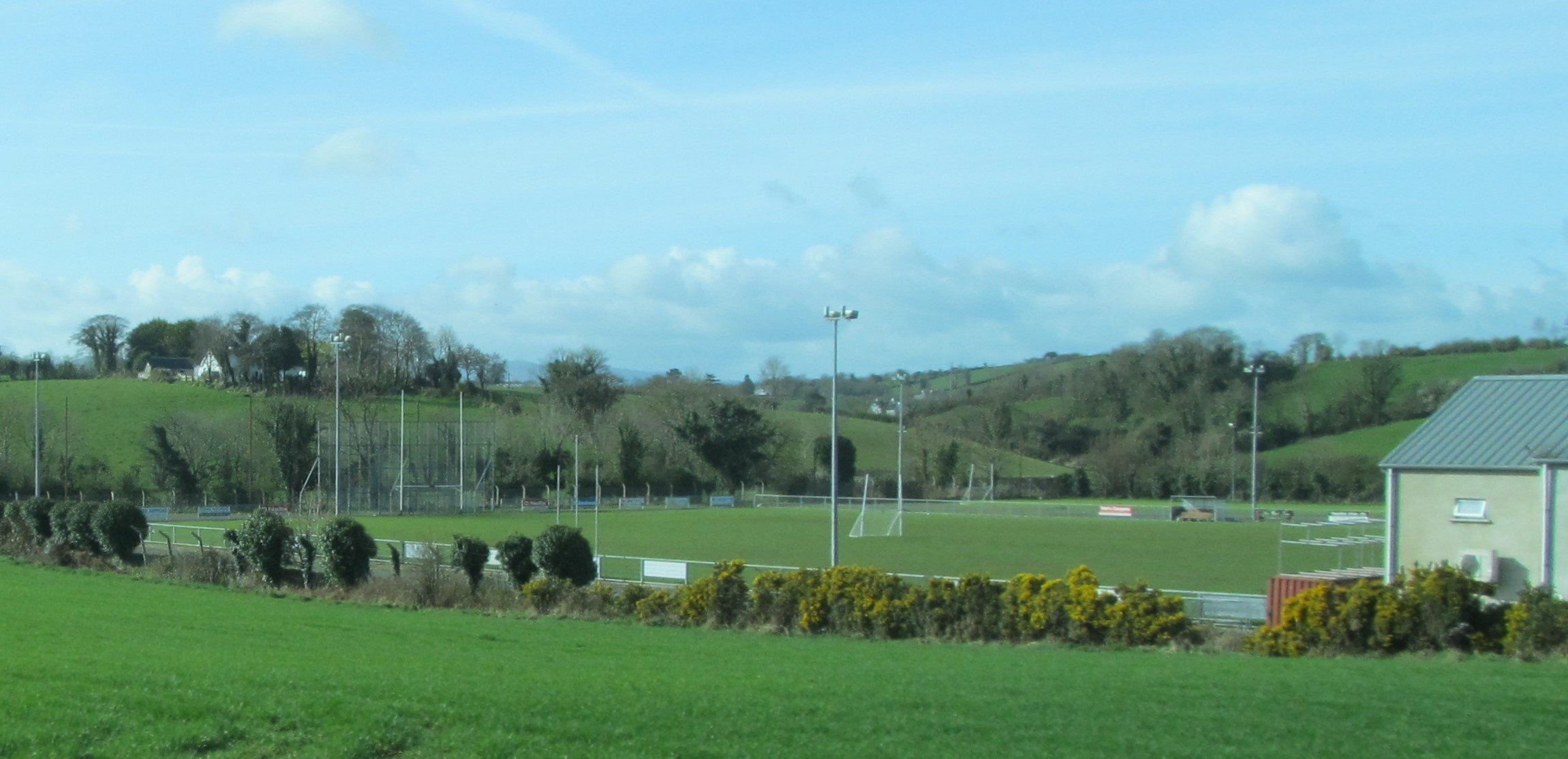
View of Drumgath grounds at Barnmeen.

Drumgath was founded in 1960; it takes its name from the parish of Drumgath. They have won three Down IFC titles.

== Honours ==
=== Gaelic football ===
- Down Intermediate Football Championship (3): 2006, 2013, 2024
- Down Junior Football Championship: 2016
