= Bryansford GAC =

Gaelic sports club, County Down, Northern Ireland

Bryansford
- Áth Bhriain
- Founded: 1926
- County: Down
- Colours: Green, gold, black
- Grounds: St. Patrick's Park, Castlewellan Road, Newcastle
- Coordinates: 54.217927°N 5.891922°W

Playing kits
Standard colours

Senior Club Championships
	All Ireland	Ulster champions	Down champions
Football:	-	2	11

Bryansford GAC (Irish: Áth Bhriain) is a Gaelic football and ladies' Gaelic football club in Newcastle, County Down, Northern Ireland. Founded in 1926, their most notable period was in 1970, when they won the Ulster Senior Club Football Championship.

== Honours ==
- Ulster Senior Club Football Championship: 2
  - 1969, 1970
- Down Senior Football Championship: 11
  - 1939, 1940, 1941, 1942, 1969, 1970, 1971, 1973, 1974, 1977, 2003

== Notable players ==
- Éamonn Burns
- Kalum King
