= An Ríocht GAC =

Gaelic Athletic Association Club

- An Ríocht
- Founded: 1981
- County: Down
- Nickname: Kingdom
- Colours: Green, White and Gold
- Grounds: An Ríocht GAA Playing Fields, Dunavil Road, Kilkeel, County Down, BT34 4JT
- Coordinates: 54°02′59.14″N 6°02′01.66″W

Playing kits
Standard colours

An Ríocht GAC is a GAA (Gaelic Athletic Association) Club based in County Down, Northern Ireland. The club provides teams from underage level to adult level in both Gaelic football and camogie. The club is one of 47 in Down GAA.

It is based in the Mournes just outside Kilkeel at Dunavil Road.

== The club today ==
An Ríocht GAC is one of the main clubs in County Down today. The club has camogie teams and football teams at Under-8, Under-10, Under-12, Under-14, Under-16, Minor, Seconds, Thirds, Under-21 and Senior Level as well as a youth club. The youth club goes under the name of The Kingdom Youth Club.

The Senior Football team are in Division 2 and play in the Down Senior Football Championship. An Ríocht is regularly represented on Down GAA teams. In 2010 three An Ríocht players started on the Down team which lost the All-Ireland Final to Cork - Brendan McVeigh, Martin Clarke and John Clarke, while James Colgan was a member of the 2010 Down panel. Brendan McVeigh and Martin Clarke also picked up GAA GPA All Stars Awards in 2010.

=== Recent notable players ===
- Brendan McVeigh, former Down goalkeeper and 2010 All Star
- James Colgan, former Down footballer and 2005 All Ireland winning Minor Captain
- Mike Quinn, former Down footballer All Ireland medal winner 1991, Sigerson Cup Winner with Queen's in 1990
- Gerard Colgan, former Down footballer and All Ireland medal winner 1994
- John Clarke, former Down footballer
- Martin Clarke, former Australian rules football with Collingwood & Down player
- Daniel Flynn, former Down footballer and Sigerson Cup winner with UCD
- Gary Cunningham, former Down footballer
- John Lavery, former Down footballer

== See also ==
- Down Senior Club Football Championship
- List of Gaelic Athletic Association clubs
