= 2019–20 All-Ireland Senior Club Football Championship =

Gaelic football tournament

- Dates: 20 October 2019 – 19 January 2020
- Teams: 32
- Sponsor: Allied Irish Bank
- Champions: Corofin (5th title); Micheál Lundy (captain); Kevin O'Brien (manager)
- Runners-up: Kilcoo; Conor Laverty (captain); Mickey Moran (manager)

Tournament statistics
- Matches played: 31

The 2019–20 All-Ireland Senior Club Football Championship was the 50th staging of the All-Ireland Senior Club Football Championship since its establishment by the Gaelic Athletic Association in 1970–71. The competition began on 20 October 2019 and ended on 19 January 2020.

The defending champion was Corofin.

Corofin defeated Kilcoo by 1–12 to 0–7 in the final at Croke Park on 19 January 2020 to retain the title. This was the club's fifth title overall, and was also the first time any team had won three successive editions of the competition.

== Format ==
County Championships

All thirty-two counties in Ireland and London play their county senior championships between their top gaelic football clubs. Each county decides the format for their county championship. The format can be straight knockout, double-elimination, a league, groups, etc. or a combination.

Only single club teams are allowed to enter the All-Ireland Club championship. If a team that is an amalgamation of two or more clubs, a divisional team or a university team wins a county's championship, a single club team will represent that county in the provincial championship as determined by that county's championship rules. Normally it is the club team that exited the championship at the highest stage.

Traditionally, the All-Ireland Club Championship Finals were held on St. Patrick's Day. The GAA decided to bring forward the Club Finals to 19 January 2020 with a view to completing the competition in the calendar year from 2021.

Provincial championships

Connacht, Leinster, Munster and Ulster each organise a provincial championship for their participating county champions. The Kilkenny senior champions play in the Leinster Intermediate Club Football Championship. London continue to compete in the Connacht championship – in previous years they played one of the provincial champions in a single match in December referred to as a quarter-final.

All matches are knock-out. Two ten minute periods of extra time are played each way if it's a draw at the end of normal time in all matches including the final. If the score is still level after extra time the match is replayed.

All-Ireland

In a bid to shorten the break between the provincial finals and the All-Ireland semi-finals, the two semi-finals between the four provincial champions will be played in early January – previously they were held in mid-February. Traditionally, the All-Ireland Club SFC final was played in Croke Park on 17 March (St Patrick's Day), but it was also moved to 19 January 2020.

== County Finals ==
=== Connacht ===
Galway SFC

| 20 October 2019 Final | Corofin | 0-15 (15) – (15) 2-09 | Tuam Stars | Tuam |
| | | | | Venue: Tuam Stadium |

| 3 November 2019 Replay | Corofin | 0-11 (11) – (08) 0-08 | Tuam Stars | Tuam |
| | | | | Venue: Tuam Stadium |

Leitrim SFC

| 13 October 2019 Final | Glencar-Manorhamilton | 0-16 (16) – (15) 0-15 | Seán O'Heslin's | Carrick-on-Shannon |
| | | | | Venue: Páirc Seán Mac Diarmada |

London SFC

| 20 October 2019 Final | Tír Chonaill Gaels | 1-11 (14) – (13) 1-10 | Fulham Irish | Ruislip |
| | | | | Venue: McGovern Park |

Mayo SFC

| 19 October 2019 Final | Ballintubber | 1-14 (17) – (14) 1-11 | Ballaghaderreen | Castlebar |
| 19:00 IST (UTC+1) | | | | Venue: MacHale Park |

Roscommon SFC

| 13 October 2019 Final | Pádraig Pearses | 2-10 (16) – (13) 1-10 | Roscommon Gaels | Roscommon |
| 15:00 IST (UTC+1) | | | | Venue: Dr. Hyde Park |

Sligo SFC

| 20 October 2019 Final | Tourlestrane | 2-17 (23) – (9) 0-09 | Coolera–Strandhill | Sligo |
| | | | | Venue: Markievicz Park |

=== Leinster ===
Carlow SFC

| 6 October 2019 Final | Éire Óg | 1-16 (19) – (5) 1-05 | Palatine | Carlow |
| 15:45 IST (UTC+1) | | | | Venue: Dr Cullen Park |
| | | Report |

Dublin SFC

| 3 November 2019 Final | Ballyboden St Enda's | 0-15 (15) – (09) 0-09 | Thomas Davis | Dublin |
| 16:00 IST (UTC+1) | | (HT: 0-07 – 0-02) | | Venue: Parnell Park |
| | Pts: Ryan Basquel (6, 3f), Ross McGarry (4), Colm Basquel (3, 2f), Declan O'Mahony, Alan Flood | | Pts: Eoin Kirby (4, 4f), David Keogh (2), Ryan Deegan (f), Shane McGrath, Eanna O'Toole | Referee: John Higgins (Na Fianna) |

Kildare SFC

| 20 October 2019 Final | Sarsfields | 0-15 (15) – (15) 2-09 | Moorefield | Newbridge |
| | | | | Venue: St Conleth's Park |
| | | Report |

| 20 October 2019 Final replay | Sarsfields | 2-15 (21) – (15) 2-09 | Moorefield | Newbridge |
| | | | | Venue: St Conleth's Park |
| | | Report |

Kilkenny SFC

The Kilkenny SFC champions take part in the Leinster Club Intermediate Football Championship.

| Final replay | Mullinavat | 1-13 (16) – (10) 0-10 | Kilkenny |
| | | | Venue: Nowlan Park |

Laois SFC

| 13 October 2019 Final | Portlaoise | 0-14 (14) – (13) 2-07 | Killeshin | Portlaoise |
| | | | | Venue: O'Moore Park |
| | | Report |

Longford SFC

| 6 October 2019 Final | Killoe Young Emmets | 0-12 (12) – (11) 0-11 | Longford Slashers | Longford |
| | | | | Venue: Glennon Brothers Pearse Park |
| | | | | Referee: Patrick Maguire |

Louth SFC

| 20 October 2019 Final | Newtown Blues | 2-09 (15) – (12) 1-09 | Naomh Máirtín | Drogheda |
| | | | | Venue: Drogheda Park |
| | | Report |

Meath SFC

| 20 October 2019 Final | Ratoath | 3-15 (24) – (19) 2-13 | Summerhill | Navan |
| | | | | Venue: Páirc Tailteann |
| | | Report | | Referee: David Gough (Slane) |

Offaly SFC

| 13 October 2019 Final | Ferbane | 2-13 (19) – (14) 0-14 | Rhode | Tullamore |
| | | | | Venue: O'Connor Park |
| | | Report |

Westmeath SFC

| 13 October 2019 Final | Garrycastle | 2-13 (19) – (15) 3-06 | St Loman's | Mullingar |
| | | | | Venue: Cusack Park |
| | | Report |

Wexford SFC

| 13 October 2019 Final | Castletown Liam Mellows | 1-17 (20) – (19) 1-16 | Gusserane O'Rahilly's | Wexford |
| | | | | Venue: Wexford Park |
| | | Report |

Wicklow SFC

| 13 October 2019 Final | St Patrick's | 0-09 (9) – (7) 0-07 | Arklow Geraldines–Ballymoney | Aughrim |
| | | | | Venue: Aughrim Park |
| | | Report |

=== Munster ===
Clare SFC

| 20 October 2019 Final | St Joseph's, Miltown Malbay | 0-09 (9) – (9) 0-09 | Kilmurry-Ibrickane | Ennis |
| | | | | Venue: Cusack Park |
| | | Report |

| 27 October 2019 Final replay | St Joseph's, Miltown Malbay | 0-12 (12) – (8) 0-08 | Kilmurry-Ibrickane | Ennis |
| | | | | Venue: Cusack Park |
| | | Report |

Cork SFC

| 27 October 2019 Final | Nemo Rangers | 2-08 (14) – (10) 0-10 | Duhallow | Cork |
| | | | | Venue: Páirc Uí Rinn |
| | | Report |

Kerry SFC

| 10 November 2019 Final | East Kerry | 2-14 (20) – (10) 1-07 | Dr Crokes | Tralee |
| 15:00 GMT (UTC+0) | | | | Venue: Austin Stack Park |

Limerick SFC

| 27 October 2019 Final | Newcastle West | 1-11 (14) – (8) 0-08 | Oola | Limerick |
| | | | | Venue: Gaelic Grounds |
| | | Report |

Tipperary SFC

| 9 November 2019 Final | Clonmel Commercials | 3-19 (28) – (07) 0-07 | J.K. Bracken's | Thurles |
| | | | | Venue: Semple Stadium |

Waterford SFC

| 20 October 2019 Final | Rathgormack | 2-06 (12) – (9) 1-06 | Ballinacourty | Dungarvan |
| | | | | Venue: Fraher Field |
| | | Report |

=== Ulster ===
Antrim SFC

| 6 October 2019 Final | Cargin | 1-10 (13) – (13) 0-13 | Lámh Dhearg | Belfast |
| 15:30 IST (UTC+1) | | | | Venue: Corrigan Park |
| | | | | Referee: Sean Laverty |

| 12 October 2019 Replay | Cargin | 3-16 (25) – (23) 0-23 (a.e.t.) | Lámh Dhearg | Belfast |
| 16:00 IST (UTC+1) | | | | Venue: Corrigan Park |
| | | Report | | Referee: Darren McKeown |

Armagh SFC

| 20 October 2019 Final | Crossmaglen | 2-18 (24) – (15) 2-09 | Ballymacnab | Armagh |
| 16:00 IST (UTC+1) | | | | Venue: Athletic Grounds |
| | | Report | | Referee: Jake Magill |

Cavan SFC

| 13 October 2019 Final | Castlerahan | 1-09 (12) – (10) 0-10 | Ramor United | Cavan |
| | | | | Venue: Breffni Park |
| | | Report |

Donegal SFC

| 20 October 2019 Final | Gaoth Dobhair | 0-08 (08) – (08) 0-08 | Naomh Conaill | Ballybofey |
| | | | | Venue: MacCumhaill Park |
| | | Report |

| 27 October 2019 Replay | Gaoth Dobhair | 0-14 (14) – (14) 1-11 (a.e.t.) | Naomh Conaill | Ballybofey |
| | | | | Venue: MacCumhaill Park |
| | | Report |

| 30 October 2019 Second replay | Gaoth Dobhair | 0-07 (07) – (08) 0-08 | Naomh Conaill | Ballybofey |
| 20:00 IST (UTC+1) | | | | Venue: MacCumhaill Park |

Derry SFC

| 20 October 2019 Final | Magherafelt | 0-12 (12) – (11) 0-11 | Glen | Derry |
| | | | | Venue: Celtic Park |
| | | Report |

Down SFC

| 13 October 2019 Final | Kilcoo | 1-12 (15) – (20) 0-14 | St Peter's, Warrenpoint | Newry |
| | | | | Venue: Páirc Esler |
| | | Report |

Fermanagh SFC

| 6 October 2019 Final | Derrygonnelly Harps | 0-10 (10) – (06) 1-03 | Roslea Shamrocks | Enniskillen |
| | | | | Venue: Brewster Park |
| | | Report |

Monaghan SFC

| 20 October 2019 Final | Scotstown | 0-11 (11) – (17) 1-14 | Clontibret | Clones |
| 15:30 IST (UTC+1) | | (HT: 0-03 – 0-09) | | Venue: St Tiernach's Park |
| | Pts: Conor McCarthy (4, 2f), Shane Carey (3, 3f), Rory Beggan (2, 2f), Darren Hughes, Micheál McCarville | | Gls: Ryan McGuigan; Pts: Conor McManus (6, 2f), Michael P O’Dowd (2), Jack Gormley, Brian Greenan, Dessie Mone, Pauric Boyle, Francis Hughes, Killian Lavelle | Referee: Stephen Hagan (Seán McDermotts) |

Tyrone SFC

| 13 October 2019 Final | Trillick | 0-12 (12) – (10) 2-04 | Errigál Ciarán | Omagh |
| | | | | Venue: Healy Park |
| | | Report |

== Provincial championships ==
=== Connacht ===
Preliminary round

Quarter-finals
Tourlestrane (Sligo) | 0-06 (06)
Padraig Pearses (Roscommon) | 3-07 (16)
Glencar-Manorhamilton (Leitrim) | 0-09 (09)
Ballintubber (Mayo) | 1-11 (14)

Semi-finals
Tír Chonaill Gaels (London) | 0-08 (08)
Padraig Pearses (Roscommon) | 2-10 (16)
Ballintubber (Mayo) | 0-11 (11)
Corofin (Galway) | 1-10 (13)

Final
Padraig Pearses (Roscommon) | 0-07 (07)
Corofin (Galway) | 1-10 (13)

==== Quarter-finals ====
| 3 November 2019 Quarter-Final A | Tourlestrane (Sligo) | 0-06 (06) – (16) 3-07 | Padraig Pearses (Roscommon) | Sligo |
| 14:00 GMT (UTC+0) | | | | Venue: Markievicz Park |
| | | | | Referee: Jerome Henry (Mayo) |

| 3 November 2019 Quarter-Final B | Glencar-Manorhamilton (Leitrim) | 0-09 (09) – (14) 1-11 | Ballintubber (Mayo) | Castlebar |
| 14:00 GMT (UTC+0) | | | | Venue: MacHale Park |
| | | | | Referee: Barry Judge (Sligo) |

==== Semi-finals ====
| 10 November 2019 Semi-Final 1 | Tír Chonaill Gaels (London) | 0-08 (08) – (16) 2-10 | Padraig Pearses (Roscommon) | Ruislip, London |
| 14:00 GMT (UTC+0) | | | | Venue: McGovern Park |
| | | | | Referee: James Molloy (Galway) |

| 10 November 2019 Semi-Final 2 | Ballintubber (Mayo) | 0-11 (11) – (13) 1-10 | Corofin (Galway) | Tuam |
| 14:00 GMT (UTC+0) | | | | Venue: Tuam Stadium |
| | | | | Referee: Eamon O'Grady (Sligo); TV: TG4 (deferred) |

==== Final ====
24 November 2019
14:00 GMT (UTC+0)
Final

| Padraig Pearses (Roscommon) | 0-07 (07) – (13) 1-10 | Corofin (Galway) |

Tuam Stadium, Tuam
Referee: Eamon O'Grady (Sligo)

=== Leinster ===
Preliminary round
Ferbane (Offaly) | 2-09 (15)
St. Patrick's (Wicklow) | 1-14 (17)
Éire Óg (Carlow) | 4-06 (18)
Castletown Liam Mellows (Wexford) | 1-10 (13)
Garrycastle (Westmeath) | 0-15 (15)
Killoe Young Emmets (Longford) | 0-06 (06)

Quarter-finals
St. Patrick's (Wicklow) | 2-08 (14) 4(p)
Portlaoise (Laois) | 1-11 (14) 5(p)
Éire Óg (Carlow) | 1-12 (15)
Sarsfields (Kildare) | 0-09 (09)
Garrycastle (Westmeath) | 3-11 (20)
Ratoath (Meath) | 2-12 (18)
Newtown Blues (Louth) | 0-05 (05)
Ballyboden (Dublin) | 1-11 (14)

Semi-finals
Portlaoise (Laois) | 1-06 (09)
Éire Óg (Carlow) | 2-11 (17)
Garrycastle (Westmeath) | 0-12 (12)
Ballyboden (Dublin) | 3-14 (23)

Final
Éire Óg (Carlow) | 0-06 (06)
Ballyboden (Dublin) | 0-08 (08)

==== Preliminary round ====
| 27 October 2019 Preliminary round | Ferbane (Offaly) | 2-09 (15) – (17) 1-14 | St. Patrick's (Wicklow) | Tullamore |
| 13:30 GMT (UTC+0) | | | | Venue: O'Connor Park |
| | | | | Referee: Seamus Mulhare (Laois) |

| 27 October 2019 Preliminary round | Garrycastle (Westmeath) | 0-15 (15) – (06) 0-06 | Killoe Young Emmets (Longford) | Mullingar |
| 13:30 GMT (UTC+0) | | | | Venue: Cusack Park |
| | | | | Referee: Cormac Reilly (Meath) |

| 27 October 2019 Preliminary round | Éire Óg (Carlow) | 4-06 (18) – (13) 1-10 | Castletown Liam Mellows (Wexford) | Carlow |
| 15:00 GMT (UTC+0) | | | | Venue: Dr Cullen Park |
| | | | | Referee: Fergal Smyth (Longford) |

==== Quarter-finals ====
| 10 November 2019 Quarter-Final A | St. Patrick's (Wicklow) | 2-08 (14) – (14) 1-11 (a.e.t.) (4-5 pen) | Portlaoise (Laois) | Aughrim |
| 13:30 GMT (UTC+0) | | | | Venue: Aughrim County Ground |
| | | Penalty shootout |

| 10 November 2019 Quarter-Final B | Éire Óg (Carlow) | 1-12 (15) – (09) 0-09 | Sarsfields (Kildare) | Carlow |
| 13:30 GMT (UTC+0) | | | | Venue: Dr Cullen Park |

| 10 November 2019 Quarter-Final C | Garrycastle (Westmeath) | 3-11 (20) – (18) 2-12 | Ratoath (Meath) | Mullingar |
| 13:30 GMT (UTC+0) | | | | Venue: Cusack Park (Mullingar) |

| 10 November 2019 Quarter-Final D | Newtown Blues (Louth) | 0-05 (05) – (14) 1-11 | Ballyboden (Dublin) | Drogheda |
| 14:00 GMT (UTC+0) | | | | Venue: Drogheda Park |

==== Semi-finals ====
| 23 November 2019 Semi-Final 1 | Portlaoise (Laois) | 1-6 (9) – (17) 2-11 | Éire Óg (Carlow) | Portlaoise |
| 19:00 GMT (UTC+0) | | | | Venue: O'Moore Park |
| | | Report |

| 24 November 2019 Semi-Final 2 | Garrycastle (Westmeath) | 0-12 (12) – (23) 3-14 | Ballyboden (Dublin) | Mullingar |
| 13:30 GMT (UTC+0) | | | | Venue: Cusack Park (Mullingar) |
| | | Report |

==== Final ====
| 8 December 2019 Final | Ballyboden | 0-8 (8) – (6) 0-6 | Éire Óg |
| 14:00 GMT (UTC+0) | | | | Venue: O'Moore Park |
| | | Report |

=== Munster ===
Round of 16

Quarter-final
St. Joseph's, Miltown Malbay (Clare) | 1-11 (14)
Rathgormack (Waterford) | 0-11 (11)
Nemo Rangers (Cork) | 1-09 (12)
Newcastle West (Limerick) | 0-09 (09)

Semi-final
St Joseph's, Miltown Malbay (Clare) | 0-07 (07)
Clonmel Commercials (Tipperary) | 0-09 (09)
Nemo Rangers (Cork) | 2-17 (23)
Austin Stacks (Kerry) | 0-05 (5)

Final
Clonmel Commercials (Tipperary) | 0-06 (06)
Nemo Rangers (Cork) | 0-15 (15)

==== Quarter-finals ====
| 10 November 2019 Quarter-Final 1 | St Joseph's, Miltown Malbay (Clare) | 1-11 (14) – (11) 0-11 | Rathgormack (Waterford) | Milltown Malbay |
| 13:30 GMT (UTC+0) | | | | Venue: Hennessy Memorial Park |
| | Gls: E Cleary 1. Pts: E Cleary 5, K Malone 4, C Murray 2. | | Pts: J Curry 7, C Murray 2, R Flynn 1. | Referee: David Murnane (Cork) |

| 10 November 2019 Quarter-Final 2 | Nemo Rangers (Cork) | 1-09 (12) – (09) 0-09 | Newcastle West (Limerick) | Mallow |
| 13:30 GMT (UTC+0) | | | | Venue: Mallow GAA |
| | Gls: C Dalton 1. Pts: L Connolly 5, K O’Donovan 1, S Cronin 1, M Cronin 1, C Dalton 1. | | Pts: I Corbett 3, E Hurley 3, S Murphy 1, T Quilligan 1, S Brosnan 1. | Referee: Padraig O'Sullivan (Kerry) |

==== Semi-finals ====
| 17 November 2019 Semi-Final 1 | St.Joseph's, Miltown Malbay (Clare) | 0-07 (7) – (9) 0-09 | Clonmel Commercials (Tipperary) | Milltown Malbay |
| 13:30 GMT (UTC+0) | | | | Venue: Hennessy Memorial Park |
| | Pts: C Cleary 3, Graham Kelly 1, Gordon Kelly 1, O Looney 1, E Cleary 1. | | Pts: J Lonergan 2, J Kennedy 2, M Quinlivan 1, Conal Kennedy 1, Colman Kennedy 1, S Kennedy 1, K Fahey 1. | Referee: James Bermingham (Cork) |

| 17 November 2019 Semi-Final 2 | Nemo Rangers (Cork) | 2-17 (23) – (5) 0-05 | Austin Stacks (Kerry) | Cork |
| 13:30 GMT (UTC+0) | | | | Venue: Páirc Uí Rinn |
| | Gls: K O'Donovan 1, A O'Donovan 1. Pts: P Kerrigan 5; K O’Donovan 2; M Cronin 2, B O’Driscoll 2; S Cronin 1, J Horgan 1, L Connolly 1, C Horgan 1, S Martin 1, C Dalton 1. | | Pts: S Quilter 1, F Mangan 1, S O’Callaghan 1, W Guthrie 1, D Fitzmaurice 1. | Referee: Sean Lonergan (Tipperary) |

==== Final ====
1 December 2019
Final

Report

| Nemo Rangers (Cork) | 0-15 (15) – (6) 0-06 | Clonmel Commercials (Tipperary) |
|---|---|---|
| Pts: L Connolly 7; M Cronin 3; K O’Donovan 1, P Kerrigan 1, B O’Driscoll 1, C Horgan 1, K Fulignati 1 | | Pts: R Peters 2; M Quinlivan 1, J Lonergan 1; J Kennedy 1, S Kennedy 1. |

Fraher Field, Dungarvan

=== Ulster ===
Preliminary round
Erin's Own, Cargin (Antrim) | 0-12 (12)
Derrygonnelly Harps (Fermanagh) | 2-10 (16)

Quarter-finals
Crossmaglen Rangers (Armagh) | 0-9 (9)
Clontibret O'Neills (Monaghan) | 0-10 (10)
Castlerahan (Cavan) | 0-11 (11)
Naomh Conaill (Donegal) | 1-11 (14)
Kilcoo (Down) | 1-11 (14)
Magherafelt (Derry) | 0-9 (9)
Trillick (Tyrone) | 3-11 (20) 5 (p)
Derrygonnelly Harps (Fermanagh) | 1-17 (20) 6 (p)

Semi-finals
Clontibret O'Neills (Monaghan) | 0-9 (9)
Naomh Conaill (Donegal) | 0-12 (12)
Kilcoo (Down) | 1-8 (11)
Derrygonnelly Harps (Fermanagh) | 0-9 (9)

Final
Naomh Conaill (Donegal) | 2-9 (15)
Kilcoo (Down) | 2-11 (17)

==== Preliminary round ====
| 20 October 2019 Preliminary round | Cargin (Antrim) | 0-12 (12) – (16) 2-10 | Derrygonnelly Harps (Fermanagh) | Belfast |
| 14:30 IST (UTC+1) | | | | Venue: Corrigan Park |
| | | | | Referee: Paul Faloon (Down) |

==== Quarter-finals ====
| 2 November 2019 Quarter-Final A | Crossmaglen Rangers (Armagh) | 0-09 (09) – (10) 0-10 | Clontibret (Monaghan) | Armagh |
| 19:00 GMT (UTC+0) | | | | Venue: Athletic Grounds |
| | | | | Referee: Sean Hurson (Tyrone); TV: BBC NI (online) |

| 3 November 2019 Quarter-Final B | Castlerahan (Cavan) | 0-11 (11) – (17) 1-14 | Naomh Conaill (Donegal) | Cavan |
| 14:30 GMT (UTC+0) | | | | Venue: Breffni Park |
| | | | | Referee: Ciaran Branagan (Down) |

| 3 November 2019 Quarter-Final C | Kilcoo (Down) | 1-11 (14) – (09) 0-09 | Magherafelt (Derry) | Newry |
| 14:30 GMT (UTC+0) | | | | Venue: Páirc Esler |
| | | | | Referee: Joe McQuillan (Cavan) |

| 3 November 2019 Quarter-Final D | Trillick (Tyrone) | 3-11 (20) – (20) 1-17 (a.e.t.) (5-6 pen) | Derrygonnelly Harps (Fermanagh) | Enniskillen |
| 14:30 GMT (UTC+0) | | | | Venue: Brewster Park |
| | | | | Referee: Niall McKenna (Monaghan) |
| | | Penalty shootout |

==== Semi-finals ====
| 16 November 2019 Semi-Final 1 | Clontibret (Monaghan) | 0-09 (9) – (12) 0-12 | Naomh Conaill (Donegal) | Omagh |
| 19:00 GMT (UTC+0) | | | | Venue: Healy Park |
| | | Report | | Referee: Noel Mooney (Cavan); TV: TG4 |

| 17 November 2019 Semi-Final 2 | Kilcoo (Down) | 1-08 (11) – (09) 0-09 | Derrygonnelly Harps (Fermanagh) | Armagh |
| 15:00 GMT (UTC+0) | | | | Venue: Athletic Grounds |
| | | Report | | Referee: Pádraig Hughes (Armagh); TV: RTÉ |

==== Final ====
| 1 December 2019 Final | Kilcoo (Down) | 2-11 (17) – (15) 2-09 | Naomh Conaill (Donegal) | Omagh |
| | | | | Venue: Healy Park |
| | | Report | | Referee: Sean Hurson (Tyrone) |

== Semi-finals ==
| 4 January 2020 Semi-Final 1 | Kilcoo | 2-08 (14) – 0-11 (11) | Ballyboden St Endas |
| 3:30 pm | | | | Venue: Breffni Park |

| 4 January 2020 Semi-Final 2 | Corofin | 1-10 (13) – 0-07 (7) | Nemo Rangers |
| | | | | Venue: Cusack Park |

== Final ==
TG4

19 January 2020
16:00 GMT (UTC+0)
Final

| Corofin | 1-12 (15) – (07) 0-07 (a.e.t.) | Kilcoo |

Croke Park, Dublin
Referee: Conor Lane (Cork)

== TV coverage ==
TG4 continued to broadcast live and deferred club championship games. Eir Sport entered the third year of an agreement to broadcast live Gaelic football and hurling club championship games, including county championships and provincial and All-Ireland club championship matches. In addition to TG4 and eir Sport, RTÉ also broadcast games from the AIB Club Championships, which runs alongside TG4's coverage.

== Awards ==
Team of the Year

1. Bernard Power (Corofin)
2. Aaron Branagan (Kilcoo)
3. Kieran Fitzgerald (Corofin)
4. Liam Silke (Corofin)
5. Kevin O'Donovan (Nemo Rangers)
6. Robbie McDaid (Ballyboden St Enda's)
7. Darryl Branagan (Kilcoo)
8. Daithí Burke (Corofin)
9. Ronan Steede (Corofin)
10. Gary Sice (Corofin)
11. Paul Devlin (Kilcoo)
12. Seán Gannon (Éire Óg)
13. Colm Basquel (Ballyboden St Enda's)
14. Martin Farragher (Corofin)
15. Conor Laverty (Kilcoo)

Footballer of the Year

- Ronan Steede (Corofin)

Also nominated: Darryl Branagan (Kilcoo) & Liam Silke (Corofin)
