= 2019 Ulster Senior Club Football Championship =

Gaelic games competition

2019 Ulster Club Senior Football Championship
Tournament details
- Province: Ulster
- Year: 2019
- Trophy: Seamus McFerran Cup
- Sponsor: Allied Irish Banks
- Date: 20 October - 2 December
- Teams: 9 (one from each of the 9 counties)
- Defending champions: Gaoth Dobhair

Winners
- Champions: Kilcoo (1st win)
- Manager: Mickey Moran
- Captain: Conor Laverty; Aidan Branagan
- Qualify for: All-Ireland Club SFC

Runners-up
- Runners-up: Naomh Conaill
- Manager: Martin Regan
- Captain: Ciarán Thompson

Other
- Matches played: 8
- Total scored: 13-169
- Top Scorer: Garvan Jones (Derrygonnelly) (0-14)
- Website: Ulster GAA

The 2019 Ulster Senior Club Football Championship was the 52nd instalment of the annual competition organised by Ulster GAA. It was one of the four provincial competitions of the 2019–20 All-Ireland Senior Club Football Championship.

Gaoth Dobhair from Donegal were the 2018 champions following their victory in the final over Monaghan's Scotstown. They didn't get to defend the title after losing the Donegal county final to Naomh Conaill.

Down kings Kilcoo were crowned Ulster champions for the first time, defeating Naomh Conaill in the final.

== Teams ==
The Ulster championship is contested by the winners of the nine county championships in the Irish province of Ulster. Ulster comprises the six counties of Northern Ireland, as well as Cavan, Donegal and Monaghan in the Republic of Ireland.

County	Team	Last win
Antrim	Erin's Own, Cargin	
Armagh	Crossmaglen Rangers	2015
Cavan	Castlerahan	
Derry	O'Donovan Rossa, Magherafelt	
Donegal	Naomh Conaill	
Down	Kilcoo	
Fermanagh	Derrygonnelly Harps	
Monaghan	Clontibret O'Neills	
Tyrone	Trillick St Macartan's	

== Bracket ==
Preliminary round
Erin's Own, Cargin (Antrim)	0-12 (12)
Derrygonnelly Harps (Fermanagh)	2-10 (16)

Quarter-finals
Crossmaglen Rangers (Armagh)	0-9 (9)
Clontibret O'Neills (Monaghan)	0-10 (10)
Castlerahan (Cavan)	0-11 (11)
Naomh Conaill (Donegal)	1-11 (14)
Kilcoo (Down)	1-11 (14)
Magherafelt (Derry)	0-9 (9)
Trillick (Tyrone)	3-11 (20) 5 (p)
Derrygonnelly Harps (Fermanagh)	1-17 (20) 6 (p)

Semi-finals
Clontibret O'Neills (Monaghan)	0-9 (9)
Naomh Conaill (Donegal)	0-12 (12)
Kilcoo (Down)	1-8 (11)
Derrygonnelly Harps (Fermanagh)	0-9 (9)

Final
Naomh Conaill (Donegal)	2-9 (15)
Kilcoo (Down)	2-11 (17)

== Preliminary round ==
20 October 2019
14:30 GMT (UTC+0)
Preliminary round

Erin's Own, Cargin (Antrim)	0-12 (12) – (16) 2-10	Derrygonnelly Harps (Fermanagh)
Kieran Close 0-5 (0-3f), Tomas McCann 0-3 (0-3f), Kevin McShane 0-2, Paul McCann 0-1, Jamie Gribben 0-1	Report	Garvan Jones 0-5 (0-2f), Conall Jones 1-1 (0-1f), Gavin McGovern 1-1, Lee Jones 0-1, Garvan McGinley 0-1, Neil Gallagher 0-1

Corrigan Park, Belfast
Referee: Paul Faloon

== Quarter-finals ==
2 November 2019
19:00 GMT (UTC+0)
Quarter-final

Crossmaglen Rangers (Armagh)	0-9 (9) – (10) 0-10	Clontibret O'Neills (Monaghan)
Rían O'Neill 0-3 (0-2f), Oisín O'Neill 0-2, Paul Hughes 0-1, Kyle Carragher 0-1, Tony Kernan 0-1, Aaron Kernan 0-1 (0-1f)	Report	Conor McManus 0-6 (0-5f), Michael P. O'Dowd 0-2, Pauric Boyle 0-2

Athletic Grounds, Armagh
Referee: Sean Hurson

3 November 2019
14:30 GMT (UTC+0)
Quarterfinal

Castlerahan (Cavan)	0-11 (11) – (14) 1-11	Naomh Conaill (Donegal)
Cormac Daly 0-4, Karl Cosgrove 0-3 (0-1f), Stephen Cooney 0-1, Brian Ennis 0-1, Enda Flanagan 0-1, Sean Brady 0-1	Report	Ciarán Thompson 1-2 (0-1f, 0-1 45), Anthony Thompson 0-3, Charles McGuinness 0-2 (0-1f), Leo McLoone 0-1, Brendan McDyer 0-1, Jeaic McKelvey 0-1, Dermot Molloy 0-1

Breffni Park, Cavan
Referee: Ciarán Branagan

3 November 2019
14:30 GMT (UTC+0)
Quarter-final

Kilcoo (Down)	1-11 (14) – (9) 0-9	Magherafelt (Derry)
Jerome Johnston 1-1, Eugene Branagan 0-2, Paul Devlin 0-2 (0-2f), Conor Laverty 0-2, Anthony Morgan 0-1, Aaron Branagan 0-1, Darryl Branagan 0-1, Ryan McEvoy 0-1	Report	Emmet McGuckin 0-3 (0-2f), Conor Kearns 0-2, Cormac Murphy 0-2, Jared Monaghan 0-1, Shane Heavron 0-1 (0-1f)

Páirc Esler, Newry
Referee: Joe McQuillan

3 November 2019
14:30 GMT (UTC+0)
Quarter-final

Derrygonnelly Harps (Fermanagh)	1-17 (20) – (20) 3-11 (a.e.t.)	Trillick (Tyrone)
Conall Jones 0-7 (0-5f), Garvan Jones 0-6 (0-3f), Eamon McHugh 1-0, Ryan Jones 0-3, Shane McGullion 0-1	Report	Lee Brennan 0-7 (0-5f, 0-1 45), Ryan Gray 2-0, James Garrity 1-0, Liam Gray 0-2, Mattie Donnelly 0-1, Daire Gallagher 0-1
Penalties
Conall Jones; Eamon McHugh; Garvan McGinley; Aidan McKenna; Gary McKenna; Conall Jones	6–5	Lee Brennan; Daire Gallagher; James Garrity; Simon Garrity; Niall Gormley; Lee Brennan

Brewster Park, Enniskillen
Referee: Niall McKenna

== Semi-finals ==
16 November 2019
19:00 GMT (UTC+0)
Semi-final

Clontibret O'Neills (Monaghan)	0-9 (9) – (12) 0-12	Naomh Conaill (Donegal)
Conor McManus 0-6 (0-5f), Dessie Mone 0-1, Francis Hughes 0-1, Darragh Hughes 0-1	Report	Eoghan McGettigan 0-6 (0-3f), Ciarán Thompson 0-3 (0-2f), Kevin McGettigan 0-1, Leo McLoone 0-1, Brendan McDyer 0-1

Healy Park, Omagh
Referee: Noel Mooney

17 November 2019
15:00 GMT (UTC+0)
Semi-final

Derrygonnelly Harps (Fermanagh)	0-9 (9) – (11) 1-8	Kilcoo (Down)
Garvan Jones 0-3 (0-2f), Conall Jones 0-1 (0-1f), Jack Love 0-1, Garvan McGinley 0-1, Stephen McGullion 0-1, Declan Cassidy 0-1, Kevin Cassidy 0-1	Report	Aaron Branagan 1-1, Paul Devlin 0-2 (0-2f), Ryan McEvoy 0-2 (0-2f), Eugene Branagan 0-1, Ryan Johnston 0-1, Jerome Johnston 0-1

Athletic Grounds, Armagh
Referee: Pádraig Hughes

== Final ==
1 December 2019
14:00 GMT (UTC+0)
Final

Naomh Conaill (Donegal)	2-9 (15) – (17) 2-11	Kilcoo (Down)
Charles McGuinness 1-1, Jeaic McKelvey 1-0, Ethan O'Donnell 0-2, Ciarán Thompson 0-2 (0-2f), Anthony Thompson 0-1, Brendan McDyer 0-1, Eunan Doherty 0-1	Report	Darryl Branagan 1-2, Aidan Branagan 1-0, Eugene Branagan 0-2, Ryan Johnston 0-2, Paul Devlin 0-2 (0-1f), Ryan McEvoy 0-1 (0-1f), Jerome Johnston 0-1, Conor Laverty 0-1

Healy Park, Omagh
Referee: Sean Hurson

== Championship statistics ==
=== Top scorers ===
Overall

Rank	Player	Club	Tally	Total	Matches	Average
1	Garvan Jones	Derrygonnelly Harps	0-14	14	3	4.67
2	Conall Jones	Derrygonnelly Harps	1-9	12	3	4.00
3	Conor McManus	Clontibret O'Neills	0-12	12	2	6.00
4	Ciarán Thompson	Naomh Conaill	1-7	10	3	3.33
5	Lee Brennan	Trillick	0-7	7	1	7.00
6	Ryan Gray	Trillick	2-0	6	1	6.00
6	Darryl Branagan	Kilcoo	1-3	6	3	2.00
6	Jerome Johnston	Kilcoo	1-3	6	3	2.00
6	Charles McGuinness	Naomh Conaill	1-3	6	3	2.00
6	Paul Devlin	Kilcoo	0-6	6	3	2.00
6	Eoghan McGettigan	Naomh Conaill	0-6	6	2	3.00

In a single game

Rank	Player	Club	Tally	Total	Opposition
1	Conall Jones	Derrygonnelly Harps	0-7	7	Trillick
1	Lee Brennan	Trillick	0-7	7	Derrygonnelly Harps
3	Ryan Gray	Trillick	2-0	6	Derrygonnelly Harps
3	Garvan Jones	Derrygonnelly Harps	0-6	6	Trillick
3	Conor McManus	Clontibret O'Neills	0-6	6	Crossmaglen Rangers
3	Conor McManus	Clontibret O'Neills	0-6	6	Naomh Conaill
3	Eoghan McGettigan	Naomh Conaill	0-6	6	Clontibret O'Neills
8	Ciarán Thompson	Naomh Conaill	1-2	5	Castlerahan
8	Darryl Branagan	Kilcoo	1-2	5	Naomh Conaill
8	Garvan Jones	Derrygonnelly Harps	0-5	5	Erin's Own, Cargin
8	Kieran Close	Erin's Own, Cargin	0-5	5	Derrygonnelly Harps
