= Rory Brennan =

Rory Brennan may refer to:

- Rory Brennan (poet)
- Rory Brennan (Gaelic footballer)
