= 2019 Sligo Senior Football Championship =

Sligo S.F.C.
- Season: 2019
- Champions: Tourlestrane (15th S.F.C. Title)
- Relegated: St. Molaise Gaels
- Connacht SCFC: ???
- All Ireland SCFC: n/a
- Winning Manager: Eamonn O'Hara & Gerry McGowan
- Winning Captain: James Leonard & Adrian McIntyre
- Man of the Match: Liam Gaughan
- Matches: 29

The 2019 Sligo Senior Football Championship is the 114th edition of the Sligo GAA's premier club Gaelic football tournament for senior graded teams in County Sligo, Ireland. The tournament consists of 10 teams, with the winner going on to represent Sligo in the Connacht Senior Club Football Championship. The championship starts with a group stage and then progresses to a knock out stage.

Tourlestrane were the defending champions for the third year running after they defeated Tubbercurry in the previous years final to claim their 14th title.

This was Shamrock Gaels' return to the senior grade after claiming the 2018 Sligo I.F.C. title. This was their first season as a senior club in 19 years since their relegation from the top-flight of Sligo club football in 2000.

On 20 October 2019, Tourlestrane claimed their 15th Sligo S.F.C. crown when defeating Coolera/Strandhill by 2-17 to 0-9 in the final at Markievicz Park. This completed a "4-in-a-row" of S.F.C. triumphs for the club becoming the first side to achieve this feat in 56 years – Ballisodare last completed the feat in 1963.

St. Molaise Gaels were relegated to the 2020 I.F.C. after losing their Relegation Final to Eastern Harps. This ended their 3 year tenure in the senior ranks since their promotion in 2016.

== Team changes ==
The following teams have changed division since the 2018 championship season.

=== To S.F.C. ===
Promoted from 2018 Sligo I.F.C.

- Shamrock Gaels - (Intermediate Champions)

=== From S.F.C. ===
Relegated to 2019 Sligo I.F.C.

- St. John's

== Group stage ==
There are 2 groups called Group A and B. The top 4 in each group qualify for the quarter-finals. The bottom finisher in each group will qualify for the Relegation Final.

=== Group A ===
Team	Pld	W	L	D	PF	PA	PD	Pts
Tourlestrane	4	4	0	0	88	29	+59	8
Tubbercurry	4	3	1	0	62	48	+14	6
St. Mary's	4	2	2	0	68	71	-3	4
Shamrock Gaels	4	1	3	0	51	59	-8	2
St. Molaise Gaels	4	0	4	1	33	95	-62	0

Round 1

- Shamrock Gaels 2-14, 0-5 St. Molaise Gaels, 27/7/2019,
- Tubbercurry 1-15, 1-9 St. Mary's, 28/7/2019,
- Tourlestrane - Bye,

Round 2

- Tubbercurry 3-13, 1-10 St. Molaise Gaels, 3/8/2019,
- Tourlestrane 1-13, 0-10 Shamrock Gaels, 4/8/2019,
- St. Mary's - Bye,

Round 3

- St. Mary's 3-14, 1-10 St. Molaise Gaels, 11/8/2019,
- Tourlestrane 1-12, 0-7 Tubbercurry, 11/8/2019,
- Shamrock Gaels - Bye,

Round 4

- Tourlestrane 2-21, 0-10 St. Mary's, 24/8/2019,
- Tubbercurry 1-12, 1-5 Shamrock Gaels, 25/8/2019,
- St. Molaise Gaels - Bye,

Round 5

- Tourlestrane 4-18, 0-2 St. Molaise Gaels, 8/9/2019,
- St. Mary's 1-20, 0-13 Shamrock Gaels, 8/9/2019,
- Tubbercurry - Bye,

=== Group B ===
Team	Pld	W	L	D	PF	PA	PD	Pts
Calry/St. Joseph's	4	3	0	1	87	54	+33	7
Coolaney/Mullinabreena	4	2	1	1	65	65	+0	5
Coolera/Strandhill	4	2	2	0	59	62	-3	4
Drumcliffe/Rosses Point	4	1	3	0	51	59	-8	2
Eastern Harps	4	1	3	0	49	71	-22	2

Round 1

- Calry/St. Joseph's 3-13, 0-12 Coolera/Strandhill, 27/7/2019,
- Drumcliffe/Rosses Point 1-14, 0-11 Eastern Harps, 28/7/2019,
- Coolaney/Mullinabreena - Bye,

Round 2

- Coolera/Strandhill 1-17, 1-10 Coolaney/Mullinabreena, 3/8/2019,
- Calry/St. Joseph's 2-22, 1-10 Eastern Harps, 4/8/2019,
- Drumcliffe/Rosses Point - Bye,

Round 3

- Coolaney/Mullinabreena 0-12, 1-7 Eastern Harps, 10/8/2019,
- Calry/St. Joseph's 2-10, 0-8 Drumcliffe/Rosses Point, 10/8/2019,
- Coolera/Strandhill - Bye,

Round 4

- Eastern Harps 2-9, 0-14 Coolera/Strandhill, 24/8/2019,
- Coolaney/Mullinabreena 1-16, 1-11 Drumcliffe/Rosses Point, 25/8/2019,
- Calry/St. Joseph's - Bye,

Round 5

- Calry/St. Joseph's 1-18, 2-15 Coolaney/Mullinabreena, 8/9/2019,
- Coolera/Strandhill 0-13, 1-9 Drumcliffe/Rosses Point, 8/9/2019,
- Eastern Harps - Bye,

== Relegation Final ==
The bottom finisher from both groups qualify for the Relegation final. The loser will be relegated to the 2020 Intermediate Championship.

- Eastern Harps 0-14, 0-10 St. Molaise Gaels, Tubbercurry, 21/9/2019,

== Finals ==
The top 4 teams from each group qualify for the quarter-finals with 1st -vs- 4th and 2nd -vs- 3rd in each case.

=== Quarter-finals ===
- Tourlestrane 2-9, 1-6 Drumcliffe/Rosses Point, Scarden, 21/9/2019,
- Calry/St. Joseph's 1-11, 2-8 Shamrock Gaels, Collooney, 22/9/2019,
- Coolera/Strandhill 1-16, 2-12 Tubbercurry, Bunninadden, 22/9/2019,
- St. Mary's 7-15, 1-14 Coolaney/Mullinabreena, Collooney, 12/9/2019,
- Shamrock Gaels 1-13, 0-11 Calry/St. Joseph's, Collooney, 29/9/2019, (Replay),

=== Semi-finals ===
- Coolera/Strandhill 2-14, 0-16 St. Mary's, Markievicz Park, 6/10/2019,
- Tourlestrane 2-19, 0-7 Shamrock Gaels, Markievicz Park, 6/10/2019,

=== Final ===
- Tourlestrane 2-17, 0-9 Coolera/Strandhill, Markievicz Park, 20/10/2019,
