= Gerry McGowan (Gaelic footballer) =

Gaelic football manager, coach, selector and former player

Gerry McGowan is a Gaelic football coach and former player. He played for the Tourlestrane club and the Sligo county team.

He won a Connacht Senior Football Championship with his county as a player in 2007.

McGowan served as a Sligo selector under the management of Cathal Corey in 2018.

With Eamonn O'Hara, he was joint manager of the Tourlestrane club that completed five consecutive Sligo Senior Football Championship titles in September 2020. He joined Clare manager Colm Collins's backroom team as a coach ahead of the 2021 season. He had left Clare by the end of the 2022 season.

In November 2022, it was announced that McGowan would be joining the Roscommon management team of Davy Burke.
