= Rory Brennan (Gaelic footballer) =

Gaelic Footballer

Personal information
- Native name: Ruairí Ó Braonáin (Irish)
- Born: 1994 (age 31–32)

Sport
- Sport: Gaelic football
- Position: Half back
Club
- Years: Club
- Trillick
Club titles
- Tyrone titles: 2
Inter-county
- Years: County
- Tyrone
Inter-county titles
- Ulster titles: 3
- All-Irelands: 1

Rory Brennan (born 1994) is a Gaelic footballer who plays for the Trillick club and the Tyrone county team.

== Honours ==
Tyrone

- All-Ireland Senior Football Championship (1): 2021
- Ulster Senior Football Championship (3): 2016, 2017, 2021
- All-Ireland Under-21 Football Championship (1): 2015
- Ulster Under-21 Football Championship (1): 2015
- Ulster Minor Football Championship (1): 2012

St Michael's College

- MacRory Cup (1): 2012 (c)

Trillick

- Tyrone Senior Football Championship (2): 2015, 2019
