= 2019 Roscommon Senior Football Championship =

Roscommon S.F.C.
- Season: 2019
- Champions: ???
- Relegated: St. Faithleach's
- All Ireland SCFC: ???
- Connacht SCFC: ???
- Matches: 55

The 2019 Roscommon Senior Football Championship is the 119th edition of the Roscommon GAA's premier club Gaelic football tournament for senior clubs in County Roscommon, Ireland. 12 teams compete, with the winner representing Roscommon in the Connacht Senior Club Football Championship. The championship starts with a group stage and then progresses to a knock out stage.

Clann na nGael were the defending champions after they defeated St. Brigid's in the 2018 final to claim their 21st S.F.C. crown.

This was Fuerty's debut in the top flight of Roscommon football after claiming the 2018 I.F.C. title.

St. Faithleach's were defeated by St. Croan's in their Relegation Final and so were relegated back to the I.F.C. for 2020 after spending 17 seasons in Roscommon football's top-flight (since their last I.F.C. title in 2002).

On 20 October 2019 Padraig Pearses won their first ever championship title on when defeating Roscommon Gaels 2-10 to 1-10 in the final at Dr. Hyde Park.

== Championship Structure Change Proposals ==
In 2019:

- Teams shall drawn randomly into three groups of four teams.

== Team changes ==
The following teams have changed division since the 2018 championship season.

=== To S.F.C. ===
Promoted from I.F.C.

- Fuerty - (Intermediate Champions)

=== From S.F.C. ===
Relegated to I.F.C.

- Castlerea St. Kevin's

== Group stage ==
There are three groups of four teams called Group A, B and C. The 1st and 2nd placed teams in Groups A, B and C automatically qualify for the quarter-finals. One third placed team from one of the three groups will receive a bye into the quarter-finals in an open draw. The remaining two 3rd placed teams will meet in a Quarter-Final Play-Off to determine the team that completes the quarter-finals lineup. The 4th placed teams will proceed to the Relegation Play-Off to determine which team will suffer relegation.

Each team has home advantage in one round, plays away in another before a neutral venue is for another round.

=== Group A ===
| Team | Pld | W | L | D | PF | PA | PD | Pts |
|---|---|---|---|---|---|---|---|---|
| Fuerty | 3 | 1 | 0 | 2 | 44 | 36 | +8 | 4 |
| Elphin | 3 | 1 | 1 | 1 | 50 | 50 | +0 | 3 |
| St. Brigid's | 3 | 1 | 1 | 1 | 57 | 46 | +11 | 3 |
| St. Croan's | 3 | 1 | 2 | 0 | 45 | 64 | -19 | 2 |

Round 1

- Elphin 1-14, 0-14 St. Brigid's, 17/8/2019,
- Fuerty 1-13, 0-8 St. Croan's, 17/8/2019,

Round 2

- St. Brigid's 0-10, 0-10 Fuerty, 23/8/2019,
- St. Croan's 3-9, 1-12 Elphin, 25/8/2019,

Round 3

- St. Brigid's 3-24, 4-7 St. Croan's, Dr. Hyde Park, 7/9/2019,
- Fuerty 1-15, 1-15 Elphin, Strokestown, 7/9/2019,

=== Group B ===
| Team | Pld | W | L | D | PF | PA | PD | Pts |
|---|---|---|---|---|---|---|---|---|
| Roscommon Gaels | 3 | 3 | 0 | 0 | 52 | 32 | +20 | 6 |
| Strokestown | 3 | 1 | 1 | 1 | 38 | 41 | -3 | 3 |
| Michael Glavey's | 3 | 1 | 1 | 1 | 37 | 44 | -7 | 3 |
| St. Faithleach's | 3 | 0 | 3 | 0 | 39 | 49 | -10 | 0 |

Round 1

- Roscommon Gaels 2-10, 0-8 Strokestown, Elphin, 17/8/2019,
- Michael Glavey's 3-5, 1-10 St. Faithleach's, Fuerty, 17/8/2019,

Round 2

- St. Faithleach's 2-7, 0-17 Roscommon Gaels, 24/8/2019,
- Michael Glavey's 0-12, 1-9 Strokestown, 25/8/2019,

Round 3

- Strokestown 2-12, 0-13 St. Faithleach's, 8/9/2019,
- Roscommon Gaels 2-13, 1-8 Michael Glavey's, 8/9/2019,

=== Group C ===
| Team | Pld | W | L | D | PF | PA | PD | Pts |
|---|---|---|---|---|---|---|---|---|
| Pádraig Pearse's | 3 | 2 | 1 | 0 | 44 | 37 | +7 | 5 |
| Boyle | 3 | 1 | 1 | 1 | 68 | 52 | +16 | 3 |
| Western Gaels | 3 | 1 | 1 | 1 | 52 | 51 | +1 | 3 |
| Clann na nGael | 3 | 1 | 2 | 0 | 40 | 64 | -24 | 2 |

Round 1

- Clann na nGael 0-13, 1-14 Western Gaels, 17/8/2019,
- Boyle 0-11, 2-10 Pádraig Pearses, 17/8/2019,

Round 2

- Boyle 2-26, 1-8 Clann na nGael, Ballyleague, 24/8/2019,
- Pádraig Pearses 1-10, 0-10 Western Gaels, Athleague, 24/8/2019,

Round 3

- Western Gaels 3-16, 3-16 Boyle, 8/9/2019,
- Pádraig Pearse's 1-12, 1-13 Clann na nGael, 8/9/2019,

== Knock-Out Stage ==
=== Preliminary Quarter-Final ===
One third placed team from one of the three groups will receive a bye into the quarter-finals in an open draw. The remaining two 3rd placed teams will meet in a Quarter-Final Play-Off to determine the team that completes the quarter-finals lineup.

| 16 September 2019 Quarter-Final Play-Off | St. Brigid's | 1-6 – 0-8 | Western Gaels | Roscommon |
| 14:30 IST (UTC+1) | | | | Venue: Dr. Hyde Park |

| Quarter-Final Play-Off | Michael Glavey's | v | BYE |

=== Quarter-finals ===
The 1st placed teams in Groups A, B and C along with the 2nd placed team with the best record are seeded for the quarter-final draw and cannot meet each other in the quarter-finals. The remaining 2nd and 3rd placed tams in the quarter-finals are unseeded. No pairing which is a repeat of a group stage fixture can occur in the quarter-finals.

| 21 September 2019 Quarter-Final | Roscommon Gaels | 2-13 – 0-11 | Elphin | Strokestown |
| 16:15 IST (UTC+1) |

| 21 September 2019 Quarter-Final | Boyle | 4-14 – 2-12 | Michael Glavey's | Castlerea |
| 17:30 IST (UTC+1) |

| 22 September 2019 Quarter-Final | Pádraig Pearse's | 4-12 – 2-12 | St. Brigid's | Ballyforan |
| 14:00 IST (UTC+1) |

| 22 September 2019 Quarter-Final | Strokestown | 1-10 – 1-8 | Fuerty | Roscommon |
| 16:15 IST (UTC+1) | | | | Venue: Dr. Hyde Park |

=== Semi-finals ===
| 29 September 2019 Semi-Final 1 | Pádraig Pearses | 3-10 – 1-14 | Boyle | Roscommon |
| 14:45 IST (UTC+1) | | | | Venue: Dr. Hyde Park |

| 29 September 2019 Semi-Final 2 | Roscommon Gaels | 1-13 – 0-10 | Strokestown | Roscommon |
| 13:00 IST (UTC+1) | | | | Venue: Dr. Hyde Park |

=== Final ===
| 20 October 2019 Final | Roscommon Gaels | 1-10 – 2-10 | Pádraig Pearses | Roscommon |
| 15:00 IST (UTC+1) | | | | Venue: Dr. Hyde Park |

== Relegation play-off ==
The Relegation Play-Off will consist of the 4th placed finishers in Groups A, B and C. The two teams with the best group record play in the Relegation Semi-Final. The loser of this semi-final must play-off with the remaining team in the Relegation Final. The winner of the semi-final and final retains their senior status for 2020, while the loser of the Relegation Final must ply their trade in the I.F.C. for 2020.

| 16 September 2019 Relegation Semi-Final | Clann na nGael | 1-10 – 0-13 | St. Croan's | Roscommon |
| 16:15 IST (UTC+1) | | | | Venue: Dr. Hyde Park |

| 22 September 2019 Relegation Semi-Final Replay | Clann na nGael | 4-15 – 1-11 | St. Croan's | Roscommon |
| 14:30 IST (UTC+1) | | | | Venue: Dr. Hyde Park |

| 28 September 2019 Relegation Final | St. Croan's | 1-16 – 1-14 | St. Faithleach's | Strokestown |
| 17:30 IST (UTC+1) |

== Championship statistics ==
=== Miscellaneous ===
- Padraig Pearses won their first ever football championship title.
