= 2019 Westmeath Senior Football Championship =

Football championship

Westmeath S.F.C.
- Season: 2019
- Champions: Garrycastle (8th S.F.C. Title)
- Relegated: St. Mary's Rochfortbridge
- Winning Captain: Doron Harte
- Winning Manager: Gary Dolan

The 2019 Westmeath Senior Football Championship is the 115th edition of the Westmeath GAA's premier club Gaelic football tournament for senior graded teams in County Westmeath, Ireland. The tournament consists of 12 teams, with the winner going on to represent Westmeath in the Leinster Senior Club Football Championship. The championship starts with a seeded group stage and then progresses to a knock out stage.

Mullingar Shamrocks were the defending champions after defeating town rivals St. Loman's Mullingar in the previous years final. The defence of their title came undone however at the second to last hurdle, when losing to Garrycastle in the Semi-Finals.

This was Shandonagh's debut in the senior grade after claiming their first ever Westmeath I.F.C. title in 2018.

On 13 October 2019, Garrycastle claimed their 8th S.F.C. title when they defeated St. Loman's Mullingar 2–13 to 3–6 in the final at Cusack Park. This was their first triumph since 2014.

St. Mary's Rochfortbridge were relegated to the I.F.C. for 2020 when finishing pointless at the bottom of Group B. This ended their two-year stay in the top-flight of Westmeath club football.

The draws for this years S.F.C. took place on 19 February 2019.

== Team changes ==
The following teams have changed division since the 2018 championship season.

=== To S.F.C. ===
Promoted from 2018 I.F.C.

- Shandonagh - (Intermediate Champions)

=== From S.F.C. ===
Relegated to 2019 I.F.C.

- Maryland

== Group stage ==
All 12 teams enter the competition at this stage.

The competition was split into two groups, based on their performance in the 2017 Group stages. Group A consists of teams who reached the Quarter-Finals last year or better. Group B consists of two bottom placed finishers in Group 1 last year as well as 3rd and 4th placed in Group 2 last year, the 2017 Relegation Playoff winners (if applicable) and the 2017 Intermediate champions.

The top 2 teams in Group A go into the Semi-Finals, where they await the winners of the Quarter-Finals, which are composed of the 3rd and 4th placed teams in Group A along with the top 2 finishers in Group B. The bottom side in Group B will be relegated to the I.F.C. for 2019, however should 2 teams finish on level points at the bottom of Group 2, then a Relegation Playoff will be conducted involving those two teams.

=== Group A ===
Team	Pld	W	L	D	PF	PA	PD	Pts
St. Loman's Mullingar	5	4	1	0	110	76	+34	8
Garrycastle	5	4	1	0	90	69	+21	8
Mullingar Shamrocks	5	4	1	0	88	68	+20	8
The Downs	5	2	3	0	95	99	−4	4
Tyrrellspass	5	1	4	0	67	92	−25	2
Athlone	5	0	5	0	53	99	−46	0

Round 1:

- Tyrrellspass 0-19, 2-8 Athlone, 13/7/2019,
- Garrycastle 1-14, 0-9 Mullingar Shamrocks, 13/7/2019,
- St. Loman's Mullingar 4-21, 4-14 The Downs, 13/7/2019,

Round 2:

- Mullingar Shamrocks 1-14, 1-12 Athlone, 24/7/2019,
- St. Loman's Mullingar 1-14, 0-12 Tyrrellspass, 24/7/2019,
- Garrycastle 1-14, 0-12 The Downs, 24/7/2019,

Round 3:

- Mullingar Shamrocks 4-14, 2-10 The Downs, 2/8/2019,
- St. Loman's Mullingar 3-12, 0-9 Athlone, 3/8/2019,
- Garrycastle 2-13, 0-11 Tyrrellspass, 4/8/2019,

Round 4:

- The Downs 3-8, 1-12 Tyrrellspass, 11/8/2019,
- Mullingar Shamrocks 1-8, 0-10 St. Loman's Mullingar, 11/8/2019,
- Garrycastle 2-13, 0-7 Athlone, 11/8/2019,

Round 5:

- St. Loman's Mullingar 5-14, 2-12 Garrycastle, 18/8/2019,
- Mullingar Shamrocks 2-19, 0-10 Tyrrellspass, 18/8/2019,
- The Downs 4-11, 0-8 Athlone, 18/8/2019,

=== Group B ===
Team	Pld	W	L	D	PF	PA	PD	Pts
Rosemount	5	4	0	1	79	52	+27	9
Coralstown/Kinnegad	5	4	1	0	74	54	+20	8
Shandonagh	5	3	2	0	93	76	+17	6
Killuan	5	2	2	1	63	73	−10	5
Castledaly	5	1	4	0	74	97	−23	2
St. Mary's Rochfortbridge	5	0	5	0	62	93	−31	0

Round 1:

- Coralstown/Kinnegad 1-17, 1-6 Killucan, 12/7/2019,
- Shandonagh 5-18, 2-10 Castledaly, 13/7/2019,
- Rosemount 1-14, 1-8 St. Mary's Rochfortbridge, 14/7/2019,

Round 2:

- Shandonagh 1-13, 1-10 Killucan, 24/7/2019,
- Rosemount 1-10, 0-7 Coralstown/Kinnegad, 24/7/2019,
- Castledaly 1-20, 2-16 St. Mary's Rochfortbridge, 24/7/2019,

Round 3:

- Killucan 0-13, 1-7 St. Mary's Rochfortbridge, 1/8/2019,
- Coralstown/Kinnegad 2-9, 0-14 Shandonagh, 3/8/2019,
- Rosemount 1-11, 0-12 Castledaly, 3/8/2019,

Round 4:

- Shandonagh 3-13, 1-8 St. Mary's Rochfortbridge, 10/8/2019,
- Coralstown/Kinnegad 2-8, 1-7 Castledaly, 10/8/2019,
- Rosemount 2–8, 3-5 Killucan, 10/8/2019,

Round 5:

- Killucan 0-14, 1-10 Castledaly, 17/8/2019,
- Coralstown/Kinnegad 3-9, 0-8 St. Mary's Rochfortbridge, 17/8/2019,
- Rosemount 4-9, 0-8 Shandonagh, 17/8/2019,

== Relegation final ==
Should two teams finish bottom Group B and on level points then a Relegation Final will be conducted between the implicated clubs. Since this was not the case with Castledaly and St. Mary's Rochfortbridge garnering 2 and 0 points throughout their group campaigns, St. Mary's Rochfortbridge were relegated.

== Finals ==
=== Quarter-finals ===
7 September 2019; Quarter-Final	The Downs	2-9 - 2-7	Rosemount	Cusack Park, Mullingar

8 September 2019; Quarter-Final	Mullingar Shamrocks	3-7 - 0-10	Coralstown/Kinnegad	Cusack Park, Mullingar

=== Semi-finals ===
21 September 2019; Semi-Final	Garrycastle	1-9 - 0-6	Mullingar Shamrocks	Cusack Park, Mullingar

22 September 2019; Semi-Final	St. Loman's Mullingar	1-12 - 0-11	The Downs	Cusack Park, Mullingar

== Final ==
21 October 2019; Final	Garrycastle	2-13 - 3-6	St. Loman's Mullingar	Cusack Park, Mullingar
