= 2019 Tipperary Senior Football Championship =

Tipperary S.F.C.
- Season: 2019
- Champions: Clonmel Commercials (18th S.F.C. Title)
- Relegated: Kiladangan
- Winning Captain: Donal Lynch
- Man of the Match: Kevin Fahey
- Winning Manager: Charlie McGeever

The 2019 Tipperary Senior Football Championship (sponsored by FBD Insurance) was the 129th edition of the Tipperary GAA's premier club Gaelic football tournament for senior graded teams in County Tipperary, Ireland. The tournament consisted of 16 clubs with the winner going on to represent Tipperary in the Munster Senior Club Football Championship. The championship began with a Group stage before proceeding to a knock-out format. The winning Club received the O'Dwyer Cup.

Moyle Rovers were the defending champions, however, the defence of their title came undone at the semi-final stage when losing to JK Brackens.

This was Kilmacthomas' return to the senior grade after claiming the 2018 Tipperary I.F.C. title. This was their return to the top flight of Tipperary club football, spending 13 seasons in the Intermediate and Junior grades since suffering relegation from the S.F.C. in 2005.

On 9 November 2019, Clonmel Commercials claimed their 18th Tipperary S.F.C. crown when defeating JK Bracken's by 3-19 to 0-7 in the final at Semple Stadium.

Kiladangan were relegated to the 2020 I.F.C. after deciding to not participate in the Relegation Play-Offs, due to their ongoing participation in the S.H.C. and I.H.C. Finals. This ended their two-year tenure in the senior ranks since their promotion in 2017.

The draw for the group stage was made on 28 January 2019.

== Regional Champions ==
West Tipperary S.F.C. Final:

- ??? -vs- ???,

Mid Tipperary S.F.C. Final:

- Loughmore/Castleiney -vs- JK Brackens/Moyne-Templetuohy,

South Tipperary S.F.C. Final:

- Clonmel Commercials -vs- Moyle Rovers,

== Team changes ==
The following teams have changed division since the 2018 championship season.

=== To S.F.C. ===
Promoted from 2018 Tipperary I.F.C.

- Moyne-Templetuohy - (Intermediate Champions)

=== From S.F.C. ===
Relegated to 2019 Tipperary I.F.C.

- Drom-Inch

== Group stage ==
All 16 teams enter the competition at this stage. The top 2 teams in each group go into the quarter-finals while the 3rd and 4th placed teams enter a new Tier 2 competition called the Tom Cusack Cup.

=== Group A ===
Team	Pld	W	L	D	PF	PA	PD	Pts
Clonmel Commercials	3	3	0	0	54	19	+35	6
Arravale Rovers	3	1	1	1	40	37	+3	3
Moyne-Templetuohy	3	1	2	0	38	60	-22	2
Galtee Rovers	3	0	2	1	33	49	-16	1

Round 1

- Clonmel Commercials 0-9, 1-4 Arravale Rovers, 13/4/2019,
- Moyne-Templetuohy 2-12, 0-13 Galtee Rovers, 17/4/2019,

Round 2

- Clonmel Commercials 2-22, 0-6 Moyne-Templetuohy, 25/8/2019,
- Arravale Rovers 2-8, 1-11 Galtee Rovers, 27/8/2019,

Round 3

- Arravale Rovers 2-13, 0-14 Moyne-Templetuohy, 8/9/2019,
- Clonmel Commercials 0-17, 0-6 Galtee Rovers, 14/9/2019,

=== Group B ===
Team	Pld	W	L	D	PF	PA	PD	Pts
J.K. Bracken's	3	2	1	0	29	20	+9	4
Ballyporeen/Clonmel Óg	3	2	1	0	60	33	+27	4
Ardfinnan	3	1	2	0	32	31	+1	2
Kiladangan	3	1	2	0	6	43	-37	2

Round 1

- JK Brackens 1-12, 0-11 Ballyporeen, 13/4/2019,
- Ardfinnan 0-9, 0-2 Kiladangan, 14/4/2019,

Round 2

- Ballyporeen 4-22, 0-4 Kiladangan, 23/8/2019,
- JK Brackens 2-8, 0-9 Ardfinnan, 27/8/2019,

Round 3

- Kiladangan w/o, scr JK Brackens, 11/9/2019,
- Ballyporeen 2-9, 1-11 Ardfinnan, 14/9/2019,

=== Group C ===
Team	Pld	W	L	D	PF	PA	PD	Pts
Loughmore/Castleiney	3	2	0	1	42	20	+12	5
Cahir	3	2	0	1	40	36	+4	5
Aherlow Gaels	3	0	2	1	30	42	-12	1
Kilsheelan/Kilcash	3	0	2	1	36	50	-14	1

Round 1

- Loughmore/Castleiney 2-9, 0-4 Kilsheelan/Kilcash, 13/4/2019,
- Cahir 2-4, 1-6 Aherlow Gaels, 14/4/2019,

Round 2

- Kilsheelan/Kilcash 0-16, 2-10 Aherlow Gaels, 23/8/2019,
- Loughmore/Castleiney 1-8, 2-5 Cahir, 25/8/2019,

Round 3

- Loughmore/Castleiney 1-13, 0-5 Aherlow Gaels, 11/9/2019,
- Cahir 2-13, 4-4 Kilsheelan/Kilcash, 14/9/2019,

=== Group D ===
Team	Pld	W	L	D	PF	PA	PD	Pts
Moyle Rovers	3	2	1	0	36	27	+9	4
Upperchurch/Drombane	3	2	1	0	30	23	+7	4
Éire Óg Annacarty	3	1	2	0	30	40	-10	2
Killenaule	3	1	2	0	31	37	-6	2

Round 1

- Moyle Rovers 0-7, 0-6 Upperchurch/Drombane, 13/4/2019,
- Éire Óg Annacarty 0-13, 1-8 Killenaule, 14/4/2019,

Round 2

- Upperchurch/Drombane 1-12, 2-3 Killenaule, 23/8/2019,
- Moyle Rovers 3-11, 0-10 Éire Óg Annacarty, 25/8/2019,

Round 3

- Upperchurch/Drombane 1-6, 0-7 Éire Óg Annacarty, 11/9/2019,
- Killenaule 0-11, 1-6 Moyle Rovers, 11/9/2019,

== Tom Cusack Cup (Tier 2) ==
The 3rd and 4th placed teams from each group enter the quarter-finals of the Tom Cusack Cup. The 4 losers of the quarter-finals enter the Relegation Semi-Finals.

Quarter-Finals:

- Killenaule 0-11, 0-4 Moyne/Templetuohy, Cashel, 28/9/2019,
- Kilsheelan/Kilcash 3-12, 0-13 Ardfinnan, Clonmel, 28/9/2019,
- Aherlow Gaels 1-11, 1-6 Galtee Rovers, Arravale, 28/9/2019,
- Éire Óg Annacarty 3-20, 0-2 Kiladangan, Thurles, 1/10/2019,

Semi-Finals:

- Kilsheelan/Kilcash 4-13, 1-4 Aherlow Gaels, Clogheen, 27/10/2019,
- Killenaule 2-13, 0-7 Éire Óg Annacarty, New Inn, 27/10/2019,

Final:

- Killenaule 1-7, 0-7 Kilsheelan/Kilcash, Clonmel, 10/11/2019.

== Relegation play-off ==
The bottom-placed team from each group enters the Relegation Semi-Finals. The two winners guarantee their senior status for another year while the two losers face off in the Relegation Final. The winner will remain in the top-flight while the loser will suffer relegation to the 2020 I.F.C.

Due to their participation in both the S.H.C. and I.H.C. finals in late October, Kiladangan decided to concede all Relegation matches and in effect self-relegated themselves to the 2020 I.F.C. A statement on the club's Twitter account read: "With the Senior and Intermediate hurlers both in County Final’s the weekend after next (as well as the U21 hurling championship in the coming weeks), the club is unable to field a team for the Senior Football relegation play off and therefore have taken the unfortunate decision to self relegate to Intermediate Football for 2020."

== Finals ==
=== Quarter-finals ===
29 September 2019; Quarter-Final	Loughmore-Castleiney	5-11 - 2-8	Arravale Rovers	Cashel
29 September 2019; Quarter-Final		Report		Cashel

29 September 2019; Quarter-Final	Clonmel Commercials	4-13 - 0-7	Ballyporeen	Ardfinnan
29 September 2019; Quarter-Final		Report		Ardfinnan

29 September 2019; Quarter-Final	Moyle Rovers	1-13 - 3-4	Cahir	Clonmel
29 September 2019; Quarter-Final		Report		Clonmel

2 October 2019; Quarter-Final	J.K. Bracken's	2-11 - 1-10	Upperchurch-Drombane	Littleton
2 October 2019; Quarter-Final		Report		Littleton

=== Semi-finals ===
27 October 2019; Semi-Final	J.K. Bracken's	2-11 - 1-13	Moyle Rovers	Cashel
27 October 2019; Semi-Final		Report		Cashel

27 October 2019; Semi-Final	Clonmel Commercials	1-17 - 1-15 (AET)	Loughmore-Castleiney	Boherlahan
27 October 2019; Semi-Final		Report		Boherlahan

=== Final ===
9 November 2019; Final	Clonmel Commercials	3-19 - 0-7	J.K. Bracken's	Semple Stadium; Attendance: 1,500; Referee: Sean Lonergan (Moyle Rovers)
9 November 2019; Final	Jamie Peters (1-1), Seamus Kennedy (0-1), Kevin Fahey (0-3), Jack Kennedy (0-4 frees), Padraic Looram (0-1), Conal Kennedy (0-1), Colman Kennedy (0-2, 1 free), Ross Peters, Jamie Lonergan (0-2), Michael Quinlivan (0-2) and Sean O'Connor (0-2).	Report	Lorcan Egan (0-1), Eanna McBride (0-1), Shane Doyle (0-1 45), Dean McEnroe (0-4, 2 frees).	Semple Stadium; Attendance: 1,500; Referee: Sean Lonergan (Moyle Rovers)
