= 2019 Derry Senior Football Championship =

Gaelic football competition

Tournament details
- County: Derry
- Year: 2019
- Trophy: John McLaughlin Cup
- Teams: 16
- Defending champions: Eoghan Rua, Coleraine

Winners
- Champions: Magherafelt
- Manager: Adrian Cush
- Captain: Danny Heavron
- Qualify for: Ulster Club SFC

Runners-up
- Runners-up: Glen
- Manager: Jude Donnelly
- Captain: Danny Tallon

Other
- Top Scorer: Shane Heavron (0-20)
- Website: derrygaa.ie

The 2019 Derry Senior Football Championship was the 96th edition of Derry GAA's premier gaelic football tournament for the top sixteen clubs. 2019 was the first year of the restructured adult football leagues of Division 1A, Division 1B and Division 2. The sixteen teams who qualified for the 2019 senior championship are explained in the 'Competition Format' section below.

Magherafelt won their first title in 41 years, beating Glen by a solitary point, 0–12 to 0–11, in the final on 20 October 2019 at Celtic Park.

Eoghan Rua, Coleraine were the defending champions having won their second title. They defeated Lavey by 1–12 to 0–12 in the final in Celtic Park on 28 October 2018.

The winners received the John McLaughlin Cup.

Magherafelt and Glen featured heavily on the County Derry Post team of the championship

== Competition format ==
Senior, Intermediate and Junior Championships

Relegations, promotions and rankings within the three divisions of the football league in 2018 were used to determine which of the three 2019 championships the thirty seven clubs competed in –

- 2019 Senior Championship (16 teams)
  All twelve 2019 Division 1A teams plus four 2019 Division 1B teams based on their rankings in the 2018 leagues
- 2019 Intermediate Championship (14 teams)
  Eight 2019 Division 1B teams plus six 2019 Division 2 teams based on their rankings in the 2018 leagues
- 2019 Junior Championship (7 teams)
  Seven 2019 Division 2 teams based on their rankings in the 2018 leagues
  Ógra Colmcille were scheduled to compete in the junior championship but they opted out in 2019.

Senior Championship Teams in 2019

The restructured adult football leagues in Derry of Division 1A (12 teams), Division 1B (12 teams) and Division 2 (13 teams) were introduced in 2019. Five teams were relegated from the 2018 Division 1 to the new 2019 Division 1B (see section 'Relegations and promotions in 2018' below for details). The 2019 senior championship was competed for by the top fifteen teams in the 2018 Division 1 and Banagher, the winners of the 2018 Division 2. Claudy, who finished 16th in 2018, was relegated to the 2019 intermediate football championship.

Current format

The senior championship reverted to straight knock-out in 2016 and the format continues with some minor alterations. If the score is level at the end of the normal sixty minutes, the match is replayed. If the replay is also level at the end of normal time, two ten minute periods of extra time are played each way.

At the end (or close to the end) of each round, a random draw is held to determine the fixtures in the next round.

Previous Formats

A back-door format was used from 2009 to 2015. Four initial ‘round-robin’ groups of four teams with the top two teams in each group progressing to the four knockout quarter-finals were used in seasons 2007 and 2008.

In the early years of Derry GAA, three separate senior championships were organised – The North Derry Championship, The South Derry Championship and The Derry City Championship. One semi-final and a final were held to determine the overall Derry senior champions. In 1958, a straight knockout format for all senior teams was introduced.

== Recent history of relegations and promotions ==
=== Relegations and promotions in 2019 ===
Senior Championship

All twelve teams in the 2019 Division 1A automatically qualified for the 2020 senior championship. Four 2019 Division 1B teams also qualified for the 2020 senior football championship –

- Claudy finished 1st in 2019 Division 1B with 19 points.
- Newbridge finished 2nd in 2019 Division 1B with 17 points.
- Kilrea finished 3rd in 2019 Division 1B with 14 points.
- Foreglen won the intermediate championship, defeating Claudy by 0–15 to 0-09. Foreglen took the place in the 2020 senior championship reserved for the 2019 intermediate champions (instead of Greenlough who finished 4th in 2019 Division 1B with 14 points).

League

Two teams were relegated from Division 1A and were replaced by two teams from Division 1B –

- Dungiven finished 11th in 2019 Division 1A with 3 points. They were relegated but retained the right to play in the 2020 senior football championship.
- Banagher finished 12th in 2019 Division 1A with 0 points. They were relegated but retained the right to play in the 2020 senior football championship.
- Claudy finished 1st in 2019 Division 1B with 19 points and were promoted.
- Newbridge finished 2nd in 2019 Division 1B with 17 points and were promoted.

=== Relegations and promotions in 2018 ===
Senior Championship

Fifteen of the sixteen 2018 Division 1 teams retained the right to play in the 2019 senior championship. Claudy (who finished bottom in 2018) played in the 2019 intermediate championship. Banagher, the winners of the 2018 Division 2, took Claudy's place in the 2019 senior championship.

League

Five teams were relegated from the old Division 1 in 2018 to the new Division 1B in 2019 and one team, Banagher, were promoted –

- Newbridge finished 12th with 12 points and played Banagher, the Division 2 winners, in a relegation/promotion match on 12 October 2018. Banagher won by 2–08 to 1-07 and were promoted to the new Division 1A. Newbridge were relegated to the new Division 1B.
- Kilrea finished 13th with 12 points and were relegated to the new Division 1B.
- Greenlough finished 14th with 8 points and were relegated to the new Division 1B.
- Glenullin finished 15th with 5 points and were relegated to the new Division 1B.
- Claudy finished 16th with 3 points and were relegated to the new Division 1B.

=== Relegations and promotions in 2017 ===
- After Division 1 football ended on 6 August 2017, Swatragh were 15th in the table with eight points and Banagher were 16th with six points. Swatragh were initially penalised three league points for not fielding against Coleraine which would have meant that Swatragh were relegated. The three point penalty was subsequently overturned and Banagher were relegated.
- Newbridge won Division 2 in 2017 and were promoted to Division 1 and the senior championship for 2018.

== Senior Championship Full Draw ==
The championship began on Friday 6 September 2019. The draw for the first round was held on Thursday 9 May 2019. Subsequent draws are held at the end (or very near the end) of every round. The bracket below can therefore only be completed when the last four teams have been paired in the semi-final draw.

First round
Slaughtneil	2-11
Newbridge	1-06
Dungiven	1-14
Ballinderry	6-18
Lavey	0-12
Greenlouugh	0-06
The Loup	1-10
Glen	1-14
Banagher	3-12
Bellaghy	3-09
Glenullin	3-12
Swatragh	0-11
Ballinascreen	2-14
Kilrea	0-09
Coleraine	0-10
Magherafelt	1-08

Quarter-finals
Slaughtneil	1-14
Ballinderry	0-11
Lavey	2-06
Glen	1-15
Banagher	1-11
Swatragh	0-11
Ballinascreen	2-05
Magherafelt	1-15

Semi-finals
Slaughtneil	1-11
Glen	3-07
Banagher	1-09
Magherafelt	1-10

Final; 20 October 2019
Glen	0-11
Magherafelt	0-12

== First round ==
The first round draw was made on Thursday 9 May 2019

6 September 2019; 8:30 pm	Lavey	0-12 - 0-06	Greenlough	Owenbeg; Referee: M McAleese (Drum)
6 September 2019; 8:30 pm	Cailean O'Boyle (0-6, 4f), O Downey (0-2, 1f) E McGill (0-1), D Hughes (0-1), Shea Downey (0-1), Ciaron O'Boyle (0-1, 1f)		N Loughlin (0-2, 2f), R Tohill (0-2), E McNally (0-1), M Bradley (0-1)	Owenbeg; Referee: M McAleese (Drum)

7 September 2019; 2:30pm	Slaughtneil	2-11 – 1-06	Newbridge	Glen; Referee: Harry Tohill
7 September 2019; 2:30pm	C Bradley (0-5, 4f), Sé McGuigan (1-1), Shane McGuigan (0-3, 3f), K McKaigue (1-0), R Bradley (0-1), B Cassidy (0-1)		D McKeever (1-0), M McGrogan (0-2, 2f), Paudie McGrogan (0-1), D Mulholland (0-1, 1f), Peter McGrogan (0-1) C McAteer (0-1)	Glen; Referee: Harry Tohill

7 September 2019; 4:00pm	Ballinderry	6-18 - 1-14	Dungiven	Glen
7 September 2019; 4:00pm	R Bell (0-10, 6f), D McKinless (1-3), C Nevin (2-0), G McKinless (2-0), O Duffin (1-0), R Scott (0-1), R O'Neill (0-1), D Lawn (0-1), R Wilkinson(0-1)		C Murphy (0-5, 2f), M Craig (1-0), J McNicholl (0-2), G McGuigan (0-2), R Mullan (0-1), T Brady (0-1), S McCloskey (0-1), M Burke (0-1)	Glen

7 September 2019; 6:30 pm	Banagher	3-12 – 3-09	Bellaghy	Owenbeg; Referee: D Harkin
7 September 2019; 6:30 pm	T Moore (2-2), C Lynch (1-1, 1 pen), G O'Neill (0-3), M Lynch (0-3, 2f), B Óg McGilligan (0-2) N Moore (0-1)		R McElwee (1-2, 1pen, 2f), F Donnelly (0-4), E Brown (1-1), P Cassidy (1-0), K McCallion (0-1), L Spier (0-1, 1f)	Owenbeg; Referee: D Harkin

7 September 2019; 8:00pm	Magherafelt	1-08 - 0-10	Coleraine	Owenbeg; Attendance: 2,831; Referee: JJ Cleary
7 September 2019; 8:00pm	S Heavron (0-4, 4f), E McGuckin (1-0), C Murphy (0-2), J Young (0-1), A McElhone (0-1)		Colm McGoldrick (0-3, 1f), N Holly (0-3), Ciaran McGoldrick (0-1), G McWilliams (0-1), B Daly (0-1) L McGoldrick (0-1, 1f)	Owenbeg; Attendance: 2,831; Referee: JJ Cleary

8 September 2019; 1:30pm	Swatragh	3-12 - 0-11	Glenullin	Bellaghy; Referee: M McGeehan
8 September 2019; 1:30pm	F Kearney (1-4, 1f), P Kearney (1-3, 1 pen), T Walsh (1-0), S Kearney (0-1), J Kearney (0-1), C McAtamney (0-1), J McAtamney (0-1) F McGurk (0-1)		D O'Kane (0-7, 4f), E Bradley (0-3, 3f), C Hasson (0-1)	Bellaghy; Referee: M McGeehan

8 September 2019; 6:00 pm	Ballinascreen	2-14 - 0-09	Kilrea	Owenbeg; Referee: R Donoghue
8 September 2019; 6:00 pm	S Mulgrew (1-7, 4f), B Heron (1-2, 1f), E Duggan (0-1), R Doyle (0-1), M Bradley (0-1), B Grant (0-1), N Doyle (0-1)		P Quigg (0-3, 0-1 pen), C Gillen (0-3, 3f), J Kielt (0-3, 3f)	Owenbeg; Referee: R Donoghue

8 September 2019; 7:30 pm	Glen	1-14 - 1-10	Loup	Owenbeg; Referee: Barry Cassidy
8 September 2019; 7:30 pm	E Bradley (0-5), P Gunning (1-1, 1f), C McFaul (0-2), A Doherty (0-2, 1f), E Doherty (0-1), C Carville (0-1), C Mulholland (0-1)		A O'Neill (1-3, 3f), Caolin Devlin (0-4, 4f), A McAlynn (0-1), T O'Brien (0-1), D McVey (0-1)	Owenbeg; Referee: Barry Cassidy

== Quarter-finals ==
21 September 2019; 6:30pm	Banagher	1-11 0-11	Swatragh	Owenbeg; Referee: John Joe Cleary (Castledawson)
21 September 2019; 6:30pm	N Moore (1-2), M lynch (0-3, 3f), C Feeney (0-3), P Hagan (0-2), S Farren (0-1)		F Kearney (0-7, 3f), P Kearney (0-2), J Kearney (0-1)	Owenbeg; Referee: John Joe Cleary (Castledawson)

22 September 2019; 1:30pm	Slaughtneil	1-14 - 0-11	Ballinderry	Glen; Referee: Damien Harkin (Slaughtmanus)
22 September 2019; 1:30pm	Shane McGuigan (0-6, 6f), C Bradley (1-3, 1f), B Rogers (0-1), C O'Doherty (0-2), B Cassidy (0-1), Sé McGuigan (0-1)		R Bell (0-4, 4f), D McKinless (0-2), K McGuckin (0-1), R Wilkinson (0-1), C Nevin (0-1), C O'Neill (0-1), C Mallaghan (0-1)	Glen; Referee: Damien Harkin (Slaughtmanus)

22 September 2019; 4:30pm	Magherafelt	1-15 - 2-05	Ballinascreen	Owenbeg; Referee: Barry Cassidy (Bellaghy)
22 September 2019; 4:30pm	C Murphy (1-2), S Heavron (0-5, 4f), E McGuckin (0-2), D Martin (0-2), D Heavron (0-1), J Monaghan (0-1), C Kearns (0-1), C McCloskey (0-1)		B Heron (2-1, 1-0f), S Mulgrew (0-3), C McWilliams (0-1)	Owenbeg; Referee: Barry Cassidy (Bellaghy)

22 September 2019; 6:00pm	Glen	1-15 - 2-06	Lavey	Owenbeg; Referee: Daniel Mullan (Glenullin)
22 September 2019; 6:00pm	A Doherty (1-2), C McFaul (0-3) P Gunning (0-2, 2f) E Bradley (0-2, 1 '45), T Flanagan (0-1), D Tallon (0-1), C Carville (0-1), E Doherty (0-1), C Convery (0-1), S O'Hara (0-1)		S Downey (1-0), A McGurk (1-0), Cailean O'Boyle (0-3, 2f), N Toner (0-1), D Chivers (0-1)	Owenbeg; Referee: Daniel Mullan (Glenullin)

== Semi-finals ==
5 October 2019; 6.30pm	Magherafelt	1-10 - 1-09	Banagher	Owenbeg; Attendance: 3380; Referee: D Harkin
5 October 2019; 6.30pm	S Heavron (0-6 ,5f), C Kearns (1-1), P McLarnon (0-2), D Heavron (0-1)		N Moore (1-1), M Lynch (0-3, 2f), C Feeney (0-2), S Murphy (0-1), C Lynch (0-1), T Moore (0-1)	Owenbeg; Attendance: 3380; Referee: D Harkin

6 October 2019; 4.30pm	Glen	3-07 - 1-11	Slaughtneil	Owenbeg; Attendance: 6095; Referee: Barry Cassidy (Bellaghy)
6 October 2019; 4.30pm	E Bradley (1-1), J Doherty (1-0), C Mulholland (1-0), P Gunning (0-2, 2f), A Doherty (0-2), D Tallon (0-1, 1f), R Dougan		R Bradley (1-1), Shane McGuigan (0-4, 3f), C Bradley (0-4, 2f), C O'Doherty (0-1), C McKaigue (0-1)	Owenbeg; Attendance: 6095; Referee: Barry Cassidy (Bellaghy)

== Final ==
20 October 2019; 4pm	Magherafelt	0-12 - 0-11	Glen	Páirc na gCeilteach, Doire; Attendance: 9,511; Referee: John Joe Cleary (Castledawson)
20 October 2019; 4pm	S Heavron (0-5, 4f), E McGuckin (0-3), C McCluskey (0-1), P McLarnon (0-1), J Young (0-1), A McElhone (0-1)	Derry Now	D Tallon (0-4), A Doherty (0-4), J Doherty (0-1), E Bradley (0-1, 1f), P Gunning (0-1, 1f)	Páirc na gCeilteach, Doire; Attendance: 9,511; Referee: John Joe Cleary (Castledawson)

== Top Scorer ==
Championship Completed.

Rank	Player	Club	Score	Total
1	Shane Heavron	Magherafelt	0-20	20
2	Christopher Bradley	Slaughtneil	1–12	15
3	Francis Kearney	Swatragh	1–11	14
3	Ryan Bell	Ballinderry	0–14	14
