= 2019 Kildare Senior Football Championship =

Kildare S.F.C.
- Season: 2019
- Champions: Sarsfields (25th S.F.C. Title)
- Relegated: Two Mile House
- Winning Captain: Sean Campbell
- Man Of The Match: Daragh Ryan
- Winning Manager: Davy Burke
- Leinster SCFC: ???
- Matches: 47

The 2019 Kildare Senior Football Championship is the 126th edition of the Kildare GAA's premier club Gaelic football tournament for senior graded teams in County Kildare, Ireland. The tournament consists of 16 teams with the winner going on to represent Kildare in the Leinster Senior Club Football Championship. The championship had a different format this year, employing a random draw for the first round, followed by seeded groups and a knock-out stage.

Moorefield were the defending champions for the second year running after they defeated Athy in the previous years final. They were looking to do the first 3 in a row since the great Sarsfields teams of the 50's and looked good only for Barry Coffey to score an equalising point in injury time to send the final to a replay. Their title challenge was undone when Newbridge rivals Sarsfields defeated them 2-15 to 2-9 on 27 October 2019 at St. Conleth's Park. This was Sarsfields' 25th S.F.C. crown.

This was Two Mile House's debut in the senior grade after claiming the 2018 Kildare I.F.C. however they were relegated back the I.F.C. for 2020 when losing their Relegation Final to Raheens.

== Team changes ==
The following teams have changed division since the 2018 championship season.

=== To S.F.C. ===
Promoted from 2018 I.F.C.

- Two Mile House - (Intermediate Champions)

=== From S.F.C. ===
Relegated to 2019 I.F.C.

- Leixlip

== Format ==
The 2019 Senior and Intermediate County Championship follows the same format as 2018. 16 teams play in eight first round games after which all 16 teams will go into four groups of four with two winners and two losers from the opening round in each of those groups. After which the teams that finish first and second will qualify for the knockout stages while the four bottom clubs have to fend off relegation in a Relegation Semi-Final.

== First round ==
- Celbridge 0-13, 0-11 Maynooth, 27/4/2019,
- Eadestown 1-15, 2-9 Clane, 27/4/2019,
- Castledermot 1-12, 1-6 Raheens, 27/4/2019,
- Moorefield 1-11, 0-7 Naas, 27/4/2019,
- Johnstownbridge 1-13, 0-13 Carbury, 28/4/2019,
- Athy 1-13, 0-14 Sarsfields, 28/4/2019,
- Confey 1-15, 2-7 Two Mile House, 28/4/2019,
- St. Laurence’s 1-10, 0-12 Round Towers, 4/5/2019,

== Group stage ==
All 16 teams play in the group stage. There are four groups of four, with each group consisting of two First Round winners and two losers. The top team in each group go into the quarter-finals, 2nd and 3rd in each group proceed to the Preliminary Quarter-Finals while the bottom team of each group entered a Relegation Playoff.

=== Group A ===
Team	Pld	W	L	D	PF	PA	PD	Pts
Sarsfields	3	3	0	0	55	37	+18	6
Moorefield	3	2	1	0	57	40	+17	4
Eadestown	3	1	2	0	40	54	-14	2
Two Mile House	3	0	3	0	44	65	-21	0

Round 1

- Eadestown 2-12, 1-9 Two Mile House, 10/8/2019,
- Sarsfields 0-12, 0-11 Moorefield, 11/8/2019,

Round 2

- Sarsfields 2-15, 1-9 Eadestown, 24/8/2019,
- Moorefield 2-19, 1-15 Two Mile House, 24/8/2019,

Round 3

- Sarsfields 2-16, 0-14 Two Mile House, 31/8/2019,
- Moorefield 3-12, 1-7 Eadestown, 31/8/2019,

=== Group B ===
Team	Pld	W	L	D	PF	PA	PD	Pts
Maynooth	3	2	1	0	50	51	-1	6
Castledermot	3	2	1	0	36	33	+3	4
St. Laurence's	3	1	2	0	37	42	-5	2
Naas	3	1	2	0	32	29	+3	0

Round 1

- Castledermot 0-11, 0-9 Naas, 10/8/2019,
- Maynooth 4-13, 1-17 St. Laurence's, 11/8/2019,

Round 2

- St. Laurence's 0-9, 0-7 Naas, 17/8/2019,
- Maynooth 0-16, 1-12 Castledermot, 24/8/2019,

Round 3

- Naas 0-16, 0-9 Maynooth, 31/8/2019,
- Castledermot 0-10, 0-8 St. Laurence's, 31/8/2019,

=== Group C ===
Team	Pld	W	L	D	PF	PA	PD	Pts
Celbridge	3	3	0	0	59	31	+28	6
Confey	3	2	1	0	47	50	-3	4
Carbury	3	1	2	0	41	51	-10	2
Raheens	3	0	3	0	38	53	-15	0

Round 1

- Celbridge 4-12, 1-9 Raheens, 11/8/2019,
- Confey 3-15, 2-10 Carbury, 11/8/2019,

Round 2

- Celbridge 1-10, 0-10 Carbury, 17/8/2019,
- Confey 0-14, 2-6 Raheens, 17/8/2019,

Round 3

- Carbury 0-15, 1-11 Raheens, 31/8/2019,
- Celbridge 3-13, 1-6 Confey, 31/8/2018,

=== Group D ===
Team	Pld	W	L	D	PF	PA	PD	Pts
Athy	3	3	0	0	54	36	+18	6
Johnstownbridge	3	2	1	0	38	40	-2	4
Clane	3	1	2	0	46	49	-3	2
Round Towers	3	0	3	0	36	49	-13	0

Round 1

- Johnstownbridge 0-12, 1-8 Clane, 10/8/2019,
- Athy 2-10, 0-8 Round Towers, 10/8/2019,

Round 2

- Athy 2-17, 1-14 Clane, 17/8/2019,
- Johnstownbridge 2-9, 1-11 Round Towers, 17/8/2019,

Round 3

- Clane 1-15, 0-14 Round Towers, 31/8/2019,
- Athy 0-15, 0-11 Johnstownbridge, 31/8/2018,

== Knock-Out Stage ==
=== Preliminary Quarter-Finals ===
- Eadestown 0-16, 1-12 Castledermot, 7/9/2019,
- Moorefield 2-9, 1-10 Clane, 7/9/2019,
- Confey 0-16, 0-10 St. Laurence's, 8/9/2019,
- Johnstownbridge 3-8, 0-16 Carbury, 8/9/2019,

=== Quarter-finals ===
- Celbridge 2-13, 0-6 Confey, 14/9/2019,
- Moorefield 3-16, 0-5 Maynooth, 14/9/2019,
- Sarsfields 5-8, 2-9 Eadestown, 15/9/2019,
- Athy 0-15, 0-11 Johnstownbridge, 15/9/2019,

=== Semi-finals ===
- Sarsfields 0-9, 0-5 Celbridge, 5/10/2019,
- Moorefield 2-10, 1-11 Athy, 5/10/2019,

=== Final ===
20 October 2019	Sarsfields	0-15 - 2-9	Moorefield	Newbridge; Referee: ??? Man of the Match: ???

27 October 2019; Final replay	Sarsfields	2-15 - 2-9	Moorefield	Newbridge; Referee: ??? Man of the Match: ???
27 October 2019; Final replay		Report		Newbridge; Referee: ??? Man of the Match: ???

== Relegation Playoffs ==
=== Relegation Semi-Finals ===
- Round Towers 0-17, 0-10 Two Mile House, 14/9/2019,
- Naas 1-6, 1-4 Raheens, 15/9/2019,

=== Relegation Final ===
- Raheens 0-17, 1-13 Two Mile House, Hawkfield, 27/9/2019,
