= 2019 Galway Senior Football Championship =

Galway S.F.C.
- Season: 2019
- Champions: Corofin
- Relegated: Killererin; Naomh Anna, Leitir Móir
- Winning Captain: Mícheál Lundy & Jason Leonard
- Winning Manager: Kevin O'Brien

The 2019 Galway Senior Football Championship is the 124th edition of Galway GAA's premier Gaelic football tournament for senior graded clubs in County Galway, Ireland. The winners receive the Frank Fox Cup and represent Galway in the Connacht Senior Club Football Championship.

Eighteen teams compete. This year there will be a new format once again. With the previous years 4 semi finalists being seeded and separated into 3 groups of 6(With one group having 2 seeded teams)

Corofin were the defending champions after they defeated Mountbellew/Moylough in the 2018 final.

This was An Spidéal's return the senior grade for the first time in 13 seasons (since their relegation from the S.F.C. in 2006) after they claimed to 2018 I.F.C. title.

== Team changes ==
The following teams have changed division since the 2018 championship season.

=== To S.F.C. ===
Promoted from 2018 Galway Intermediate Football Championship

- An Spidéal - (Intermediate Champions)

=== From S.F.C. ===
Relegated to 2019 Galway Intermediate Football Championship

- Caltra
- Cortoon Shamrocks
- Kilconly

== Format ==
=== Group stage ===
2019 brings about a new format for the competition where there is 3 groups of 6 teams. The 2018 Semi-finalists, Corofin, Mountbellew/Moylough, Annaghdown and Salthill/Knocknacarra will be Seeded and placed in each Group, with one group having two seeded teams. The remaining group places made up from the remaining 14 teams in an open draw.

If teams are level on points, the first deciding factor will be the head-to-head result between the sides; the second will be the points difference; and the third will be the scoring average.

== Group stages ==
=== Group 1 ===
Pos	Team	Pld	W	D	L	PF	PA	PD	Pts
1	Salthill/Knocknacarra	5	4	1	0	76	62	+14	9
2	St Michael's	5	3	1	1	70	61	+9	7
3	An Spidéal	5	3	0	2	74	64	+10	6
4	Milltown	5	1	1	3	77	88	−11	3
5	Killererin	5	1	1	3	74	87	−13	3
6	Barna	5	0	2	3	57	66	−9	2

Updated to match(es) played on unknown. Source:

Round 1

25/05/2019
7 30 PM

Milltown	4-10 - 3-13	Killererin

Tuam Stadium
Referee: Richard Mc Nicholas
25/05/2019
2 30 PM

Salthill-Knocknacarra	0-11 - 1-8	Barna

Moycullen
Referee: Martin Flaherty
25/05/2019
4 15 PM

St Michael's	1-9 - 0-10	An Spidéal

Moycullen
Referee: Anthony Coyne

Round 2

23/06/2019
4 30 PM

An Spidéal	2-15 - 0-12	Milltown

Pearse Stadium
Referee: Kieran Quinn
23/06/2019
3 30 PM

Salthill-Knocknacarra	0-11 - 0-09	Killererin

Tuam Stadium
Referee: Martin Flaherty
22/06/2019
5 30 PM

Barna	0-10 - 0-07	St Michael's

Pearse Stadium
Referee: Gerry Daly

Round 3

09/08/2019
7 45 PM

An Spidéal	0-15 - 1-09	Killererin

Pearse Stadium
Referee: Martin Flaherty
10/08/2019
2 15 PM

St Michael's	1-06 - 2-11	Salthill-Knocknacarra

Pearse Stadium
Referee: Thomas Murphy
10/08/2019
2 15 PM

Barna	0-10 - 1-09	Milltown

Tuam Stadium
Referee: Christopher Ryan

Round 4

24/8/2019

Killererin	2-14 - 1-12	Barna

24/8/2019

St Michael's	1-12 - 1-10	Milltown

25/8/2019

Salthill/Knocknacarra	1-14 - 1-12	An Spidéal

Round 5

7/9/2019

Salthill/Knocknacarra	2-14 - 3-9	Milltown

7/9/2019

St Michael's	3-15 - 0-11	Killererin

7/9/2019

An Spidéal	0-13 - 0-11	Barna

=== Group 2 ===
Pos	Team	Pld	W	D	L	PF	PA	PD	Pts
1	Corofin	5	5	0	0	118	61	+57	10
2	Tuam Stars	5	4	0	1	86	61	+25	8
3	Claregalway	5	3	0	2	87	74	+13	6
4	Annaghdown	5	2	0	3	65	72	−7	4
5	St James'	5	1	0	4	74	102	−28	2
6	Naomh Anna, Leitir Móir	5	0	0	5	48	108	−60	0

Updated to match(es) played on unknown. Source:

Round 1

25/05/2019
5 15 PM

Annaghdown	0-12 - 3-11	Claregalway

Kenny Park
Referee: Ronan McNulty
25/05/2019
5 45 PM

Naomh Anna, Leitir Móir	0-8 - 3-14	St James'

Clonbur
Referee: Austin O Connell
25/05/2019
7 00 PM

Corofin	1-14 - 0-13	Tuam Stars

Kenny Park
Referee: Kieran Quinn

Round 2

23/06/2019
2 45 PM

Claregalway	3-16 - 0-6	Naomh Anna, Leitir Móir

Pearse Stadium
Referee: Christopher Ryan
22/06/2019
6 45 PM

St James'	0-11 - 5-21	Corofin

Tuam Stadium
Referee: P. J. Rabbitte
22/06/2019
8 00 PM

Tuam Stars	1-9 - 0-7	Annaghdown

Corofin
Referee: Anthony Coyne

Round 3

9/8/2019

Corofin	2-11 - 1-11	Annaghdown

10/8/2019

Tuam Stars	2-12 - 1-11	Naomh Anna, Leitir Móir

18/8/2019

Claregalway	1-14 - 1-13	St James'

Round 4

24/8/2019

Tuam Stars	4-15 - 2-9	St James'

25/8/2019

Annaghdown	1-15 - 1-11	Naomh Anna, Leitir Móir

25/8/2019

Corofin	2-18 - 2-11	Claregalway

Round 5

8/9/2019

Corofin	5-9 - 0-6	Naomh Anna, Leitir Móir

8/9/2019

Annaghdown	0-14 - 0-9	St James'

8/9/2019

Tuam Stars	1-13 - 0-8	Claregalway

=== Group 3 ===
Pos	Team	Pld	W	D	L	PF	PA	PD	Pts
1	Moycullen	5	4	0	1	98	62	+36	8
2	Mountbellew/Moylough	5	4	0	1	82	45	+37	8
3	Kilannin	5	3	0	2	76	70	+6	6
4	Monivea/Abbeyknockmoy	5	3	0	2	69	66	+3	6
5	An Cheathrú Rua	5	1	0	4	59	106	−47	2
6	Caherlistrane	5	0	0	5	44	79	−35	0

Updated to match(es) played on unknown. Source:

Round 1

25/05/2019
6 45 PM

Mountbellew/Moylough	1-12 - 1-5	Monivea-Abbey

Duggan Park
Referee: Gearoid O Conamha
25/05/2019
4 00 PM

An Cheathrú Rua	2-7 - 1-7	Caherlistrane

Clonbur
Referee: Frank Kinneen
26/05/2019
12 30 PM

Moycullen	4-6 - 1-14	Killannin

Oughterard
Referee: James Molloy

Round 2

23/06/2019
5 15 PM

Caherlistrane	1-2 - 1-13	Mountbellew/Moylough

Tuam Stadium
Referee: Ronan McNulty
22/06/2019
7 15 PM

Kilannin	3-11 - 2-11	An Cheathrú Rua

Pearse Stadium
Referee: Thomas Murphy
22/06/2019
5 00 PM

Monivea-Abbey	0-14 - 1-9	Moycullen

Tuam Stadium
Referee: Frank Kinneen

Round 3

10/8/2019

Moycullen	0-11 - 0-10	Mountbellew/Moylough

10/8/2019

Monivea-Abbey	0-17 - 2-6	An Cheathrú Rua

17/8/2019

Kilannin	0-11 - 0-5	Caherlistrane

Round 4

24/8/2019

Moycullen	4-23 - 1-6	An Cheathrú Rua

24/8/2019

Mountbellew/Moylough	1-14 - 0-13	Kilannin

25/8/2019

Monivea-Abbey	0-17 - 1-9	Caherlistrane

Round 5

7/9/2019

Moycullen	2-16 - 1-9	Caherlistrane

7/9/2019

Mountbellew/Moylough	2-18 - 1-5	An Cheathrú Rua

7/9/2019

Monivea-Abbey	2-16 - 1-9	Caherlistrane

== Knockout stage ==
Quarter-finals
QF 1
Corofin	1-16
Mountbellew/Moylough	1-10
QF 2
Salthill-Knocknacarra	0-13
Claregalway	1-09
QF 3
Moycullen	1-13
St Michael's	0-11
QF 4
Tuam Stars	0-11
An Spidéal	0-08

Semi-finals
SF 1
Corofin	1-16
Salthill-Knocknacarra	1-10
SF 2
Tuam Stars	3-11
Moycullen	1-12

Final
Final
Corofin	0-11
Tuam Stars	0-08

=== Quarter-finals ===
QF 1

Sun 22 Sep 2019
4 45 PM

Corofin	1-16 - 1-10	Mountbellew/Moylough

Tuam Stadium
Referee: Gearoid O Conamha

QF 2

Sun 22 Sep 2019
3 00 PM

Salthill-Knocknacarra	0-13 - 1-09	Claregalway

Tuam Stadium
Referee: Gerald Anthony Lohan

QF 3

Sat 21 Sep 2010
4 45 PM

Moycullen	1-13 - 0-11	St Michael's

Pearse Stadium
Referee: Richard McNicholas

QF 4

Sat 21 Sep 2010
3 00 PM

Tuam Stars	0-11 - 0-08	An Spidéal

Pearse Stadium
Referee: Ronan McNulty

=== Semi-finals ===
Semi-final 1

Sat 5 Oct 2019
5 00 PM

Corofin	1-16 - 2-9	Salthill-Knocknacarra

Tuam Stadium
Referee: Austin O Connell

Semi-final 2

Sun 6 Oct 2019
2 00 PM

Tuam Stars	3-11 - 1-12	Moycullen

Pearse Stadium
Referee: Frank Kinneen

=== Final ===
Sun 20 Oct 2019
3 30 PM

Corofin	0-15 - 2-9	Tuam Stars
Jason Leonard 0-4 (2f), Gary Sice 0-4 (3f), Liam Silke 0-2, Michael Farragher 0-2, Kieran Molloy 0-2, Martin Farragher 0-1,	Report	Brian Mannion 0-5 (2f), Jamie Murphy 1-1 (1-0 pen), Paul Collins 1-0, Ben O’Connell 0-1, Noel Henry 0-1, Gavan Connell 0-1

Tuam Stadium
Referee: Gearoid O Conamha

==== Final - Replay ====
Sun 3 Nov 2019

Corofin	0-11 - 0-08	Tuam Stars
	Report

Tuam Stadium
Referee: Noel Dempsey

== Relegation playoffs ==
=== Format ===
This year, two teams will be relegated. The bottom two teams in each group will playoff, with the winner retaining Senior status, and the loser moving into a round robin group. The bottom two team in the round robin group will be relegated

=== Playoff Games ===
Sat 21 Sep 2019

An Cheathrú Rua	2-13 - 0-10	Naomh Anna Leitir Móir

Sat 21 Sep 2019

St James'	2-18 - 2-12 (a.e.t.)	Barna

Sun 22 Sep 2019

Caherlistrane	3-5 - 0-8	Killererin

=== Relegation Group stage ===
The bottom two teams in the table will be relegated.

==== Relegation Group ====
Pos	Team	Pld	W	D	L	PF	PA	PD	Pts	Qualification or relegation
1	Barna	2	2	0	0	43	24	+19	4	Retains Senior Status
2	Killererin	2	1	0	1	30	36	−6	2	Relegated
3	Naomh Anna Leitir Móir	2	0	0	2	26	39	−13	0	Relegated

Updated to match(es) played on unknown. Source:

Game 1

Sat 5 Oct 2019

Barna	1-19 - 1-8	Naomh Anna Leitir Móir

Game 2

Sat 19 Oct 2019
2 00 PM

Killererin	1-14 - 2-9	Naomh Anna Leitir Móir

The Priarie
Referee: James Molloy

Game 3

Sun 27 Oct 2019
2 00 PM

Barna	3-12 - 1-10	Killererin

Pearse Stadium
Referee: Máirtín Ó Gríofa
