= 2019 Laois Senior Football Championship =

Laois S.F.C.
- Season: 2019
- Champions: Portlaoise (35th S.F.C. Title)
- Relegated: Crettyard
- Winning Captain: David Seale
- Man Of The Match: Kieran Lillis
- Winning Manager: Niall Rigney
- Matches: 35

The 2019 Laois Senior Football Championship was the 129th edition of the Laois GAA's premier club Gaelic football tournament for senior graded teams in County Laois, Ireland. The tournament consisted of 16 teams with the winner going on to represent Laois in the Leinster Senior Club Football Championship. The championship had a back-door format for the first two rounds before proceeding to a knock-out format. Generally, any team to lose two matches will be knocked out of the championship.

Portlaoise were the defending champions after they defeated O'Dempsey's in the previous years final. They successfully defended their title to claim a "3-in-a-row" (and their 12th in 13 years) of victories when they defeated Killeshin in this years final. This was their 35th S.F.C. title overall, a feat achieved by no other club in any county of Ireland.

Courtwood returned to the senior grade for the first time since the 1990s after claiming the 2018 I.F.C. title.

Crettyard were relegated to the 2020 I.F.C. following their relegation Final loss to The Heath. This ended their 14-year stay in the top-flight of Laois club football since claiming the 2005 Laois and Leinster Intermediate Club Football Championships.

== Team changes ==
The following teams have changed division since the 2018 championship season.

=== To S.F.C. ===
Promoted from 2018 I.F.C.

- Courtwood – (Intermediate Champions)

=== From S.F.C. ===
Relegated to 2019 I.F.C.

- Clonaslee–St Manman's Gaels

== Round 1 ==
All 16 teams enter the competition in this round. The 8 winners progress to Round 2A, while the 8 losers progress to Round 2B.

- Portlaoise 2-18, 0-11 Ballylinan, 24/7/2019,
- Killeshin 3-14, 2-6 Stradbally, 26/7/2019,
- Portarlington 0-19, 0-7 The Heath, 27/7/2019,
- O'Dempsey's 2-15, 0-11 St Joseph's, 27/8/2019,
- Graiguecullen 2-11, 0-7 Ballyfin, 28/7/2019,
- Arles–Killeen 1-13, 1-11 Crettyard, 28/7/2019,
- Ballyroan Abbey 1-13, 2-10 Emo, 30/7/2019,
- Courtwood 4-14, 1-11 Arles–Kilcruise, 31/7/2019,
- Ballyroan Abbey 1-10, 0-12 Emo, 6/8/2019, (Replay),

== Round 2 ==
=== Round 2A ===
The 8 winners from Round 1 enter this round. The 4 winners from this round will enter the draw for the quarter-finals, while the 4 losers will play in Round 3.

- Portlaoise 1-13, 1-7 Courtwood, 10/8/2019,
- Portarlington 0-16, 2-10 Ballyroan Abbey, 10/8/2019,
- Killeshin 1-13, 0-15 Arles–Killeen, 11/8/2019,
- O'Dempsey's 0-13, 0-10 Graiguecullem, 11/8/2019,
- Portarlington 1-16, 1-10 Ballyroan Abbey, 14/8/2019, (Replay),

=== Round 2B ===
The 8 losers from Round 1 enter this round. The 4 winners from this round will go into Round 3, while the 4 losers will enter the Relegation Playoffs.

- St Joseph's 2-10, 0-12 The Heath, 9/8/2019,
- Ballyfin 4-13, 1-8 Crettyard, 10/8/2019,
- Ballylinan 3-9, 2-12 Arles–Kilcruise, 11/8/2019,
- Emo 3-12, 2-12 Stradbally, 11/8/2019,
- Ballylinan 2-6, 0-9 Arles–Kilcruise, 15/8/2019, (Replay),

== Round 3 ==
The 4 losers from Round 2A enter this round and play the 4 winners from Round 2B. The 4 winners from this round will go into the draw for the quarter-finals.

- Ballyfin 5-17, 3-13 Arles–Killeen, 24/8/2019,
- Ballylinan 1-15, 2-11 Courtwood, 24/8/2019,
- Graiguecullen 1-14, 1-10 Emo, 25/8/2019,
- St Joseph's 1-15, 2-11 Ballyroan Abbey, 25/8/2019,

== Quarter-finals ==
The quarter-finals will eliminate four teams, leaving 4 teams. These teams will face off against each other in the semi-finals.

- Portlaoise 1-9, 1-6 St Joseph's, 15/9/2019,
- Portarlington 2-11, 2-11 Graiguecullen, 15/9/2019,
- Ballyfin 1-14, 1-11 O'Dempsey's, 15/9/2019,
- Killeshin 0-15, 0-8 Ballylinan, 15/9/2019,
- Portarlington 5-15, 3-7 Graiguecullen, 19/9/2019, (Replay),

== Semi-finals ==
In the semi-finals, two further teams will be eliminated, leaving the best from each set to play each other in the Final.

- Portlaoise 1-13, 1-11 Portarlington, 29/9/2019,
- Killeshin 2-8, 1-11 Ballyfin, 29/9/2019,
- Killeshin 0-17, 1-10 Ballyfin, 2/10/2019, (Replay),

== Final ==
The remaining two teams play against each other to determine the champion.

- Portlaoise 0-14 -- 2-7 Killeshin, 13/10/2019,

== Relegation playoff ==
=== Relegation Semi-Finals ===
- Arles–Kilcruise 2-16, 2-12 Crettyard, 24/8/2019,
- Stradbally 1-14, 0-12 The Heath, 25/8/2019,

=== Relegation Final ===
- The Heath 1-16, 1-8 Crettyard, 13/9/2019.
