= 2019 Longford Senior Football Championship =

Longford S.F.C.
- Season: 2019
- Champions: Killoe (12th title)
- Relegated: None
- Winning Captain: Seán McCormack
- Man of the Match: Daniel Mimnagh
- Winning Manager: Thomas Donohoe
- Matches: 25

The 2019 Longford Senior Football Championship is the 103rd running of the Longford GAA's premier club Gaelic football tournament for senior graded teams in County Longford, Ireland, since the first County Championship was held in 1890 (102 completed since 1890, 1 started but not completed in 1891). The 2019 tournament consisted of 11 teams, with the winner going on to represent Longford in the Leinster Senior Club Football Championship. The championship starts with a group stage and then progresses to a knock out stage.

Mullinalaghta St. Columba's were the defending champions after they defeated Abbeylara after in the previous year's final replay.

This year was Rathcline's return to the top-flight for the first time since the 2016 season after claiming the 2018 Longford I.F.C. title. The club also won the I.F.C. title in 2017; however, they opted to stay in the middle grade for 2018, stating that "While we won the Intermediate Championship, it was decided to remain in the Intermediate championship for 2018 to allow our very young side develop further before embarking on Senior Championship".

On 6 October 2019 Killoe Young Emmets claimed their 12th Senior Football Championship title and their first since 2015 when defeating Longford Slashers 0-12 to 0-11 in an exciting and close final at Pearse Park.

Rathcline and St. Mary's Granard were supposed to be relegated to the I.F.C. for 2020, which should have ended their respective seven and one year tenures in the top-flight of Longford club football. However, due to the emergence of the COVID-19 pandemic and the desire to maintain a 12 team S.F.C., the two clubs were given a reprieve.

== Team changes ==
The following teams have changed division since the 2018 championship season.

=== To S.F.C. ===
Promoted from 2018 I.F.C.

- Rathcline – (Intermediate Champions)

=== From S.F.C. ===
Relegated to 2019 I.F.C.

- Ballymahon

== Group stage ==
Groups A and B each consisted of four teams with three teams from each group progressing to the quarter-finals and last year's finalists being kept apart. Group C consisted of three teams, with two teams proceeding to the quarter-finals. The bottom finishers in each group were to play off to decide relegation to the 2019 I.F.C.

=== Group A ===
Team	Pld	W	L	D	PF	PA	PD	Pts
Mullinalaghta St Columba's	3	3	0	0	55	30	+25	6
Clonguish	3	2	1	0	49	30	+19	4
Dromard	3	1	2	0	41	38	+3	2
St Mary's Granard	3	0	3	0	23	70	-47	0

Round 1:

- Mullinalaghta 1-20, 1-6 Granard, 20 July 2019,
- Clonguish 0-12, 0-10 Dromard, 21 July 2019,

Round 2:

- Mullinalaghta 0-16, 2-6 Clonguish, 27 July 2019,
- Dromard 2-16, 0-10 Granard, 28 July 2019,

Round 3:

- Mullinalaghta 0-16, 0-9 Dromard, 11 August 2019,
- Clonguish 4-13, 0-4 Granard, 11 August 2019,

=== Group B ===
Team	Pld	W	L	D	PF	PA	PD	Pts
Killoe Young Emmets	3	2	0	1	45	35	+10	5
Abbeylara	3	2	1	0	48	45	+3	4
Carrickedmond	3	1	2	0	35	46	-11	2
Mostrim	3	0	2	1	39	41	-2	1

Round 1:

- Abbeylara 1-13, 1-12 Mostrim, 19 July 2019,
- Killoe Young Emmets 1-13, 0-9 Carrickedmond, 21 July 2019,

Round 2:

- Killoe Young Emmets 0-14, 1-11 Mostrim, 26 July 2019,
- Abbeylara 1-17, 2-9 Carrickedmond, 27 July 2019,

Round 3:

- Carrickedmond 0-11, 0-10 Mostrim, 10 August 2019,
- Killoe Young Emmets 1-12, 0-12 Abbeylara, 16 August 2019,

=== Group C ===
Team	Pld	W	L	D	PF	PA	PD	Pts
Colmcille	2	1	0	1	45	27	+18	3
Longford Slashers	2	1	0	1	32	26	+6	3
Rathcline	2	0	2	0	17	41	-24	0

Round 1:

- Longford Slashers 2-12, 2-12 Colmcille, 20 July 2019,

Round 2:

- Colmcille 2-21, 0-9 Rathcline, 28 July 2019,

Round 3:

- Longford Slashers 0-14, 0-8 Rathcline, 9 August 2019,

== Relegation playoff ==
The bottom-placed teams from Groups A, B and C all compete in a Relegation Playoff in a round-robin format. The two lowest-ranked teams after three matches were relegated to the 2020 I.F.C.

Team	Pld	W	L	D	PF	PA	PD	Pts
Mostrim	2	1	1	0	32	30	-2	2
Rathcline	2	1	1	0	39	39	+0	2
St Mary's Granard	2	1	1	0	33	35	-2	2

Game 1:

- Rathcline 3-14, 1-16 Granard, Ardagh, 25 August 2019,

Game 2:

- Granard 1-11, 0-12 Mostrim, Clonguish, 30 August 2019,

Game 3:

- Mostrim 2-14, 1-13 Rathcline, Killoe, 11 September 2019,

== Knockout stage ==
The top eight teams from the league stages qualify for the quarter-finals.

Quarter-Finals		Semi-Finals		Final
Dromard	1-10
Killoe	1-13	Killoe	2-10
Colmcille	1-14	Colmcille	0-11
Mullinalaghta	1-13			Killoe	0-12
Clonguish	1-10			Longford Slashers	0-11
Longford Slashers	1-11	Longford Slashers	0-11
Abbeylara	2-12	Abbeylara	0-10
Carrickedmond	0-8

== Quarter-finals ==
24 August 2019; Quarter-Final	Killoe Young Emmets	1-13 : 1-10	Dromard	Pearse Park, Longford

25 August 2019; Quarter-Final	Colmcille	1-14 : 1-13	Mullinalaghta St Columba's	Pearse Park

31 August 2019; Quarter-Final	Longford Slashers	0-11 : 1-10	Clonguish	Pearse Park

31 August 2019; Quarter-Final	Abbeylara	2-12 : 0-8	Carrickedmond	Pearse Park

== Semi-finals ==
8 September 2019; Semi-Final	Killoe Young Emmets	2-10 : 0-11	Colmcille	Pearse Park

15 September 2019; Semi-Final	Longford Slashers	0-11 : 0-10	Abbeylara	Pearse Park

== Final ==
6 October 2019; 4pm. Final	Killoe Young Emmets	0-12 - 0-11	Longford Slashers	Pearse Park; Referee: Patrick Maguire; Man of the Match: Daniel Mimnagh
6 October 2019; 4pm. Final	R McGoldrick (0-2), S Kiernan (0-1); D McGoldrick (0-1), S McCormack (0-3, 1f), D Mimnagh (0-3); M Hughes (0-1), C Farrelly (0-1)	Report	C Farrell (0-2, 0-1 free, 0-1 45’); P Foy (0-1), A Kelly (0-5, all frees), R Clarke (0-3, 0-1 free)	Pearse Park; Referee: Patrick Maguire; Man of the Match: Daniel Mimnagh
