= 2019 Waterford Senior Football Championship =

Waterford S.F.C.
- Season: 2019
- Champions: Rathgormack (10th S.F.C. Title)
- Relegated: Portlaw

The 2019 Waterford Senior Football Championship is the 132nd edition of the Waterford GAA's premier club Gaelic football tournament for senior graded clubs in County Waterford, Ireland. The tournament consists of 12 teams, with the winner going on to represent Waterford in the Munster Senior Club Football Championship. The championship starts with a stage and then progresses to a knock out stage.

The Nire were the defending champions after they defeated Kilrossanty in the previous years final. However the defence of their title came undone at the semi-final stage when losing to Ballinacourty.

This was Kilmacthomas' return to the senior grade after claiming the 2018 Waterford I.F.C. title. This was their first year back in the top-flight of Waterford club football in 16 years since relegation at the end of the 2003 season.

On 20 October 2019, Rathgormack claimed their 10th Waterford S.F.C. crown when defeating Ballinacourty by 2–6 to 1–6 in the final at Fraher Field.

Portlaw were relegated to the 2020 I.F.C. after losing their Relegation Final to Brickey Rangers. This ended their three-year stay in the senior ranks.

== Team changes ==
The following teams have changed division since the 2018 championship season.

=== To S.F.C. ===
Promoted from 2018 Waterford I.F.C.

- Kilmacthomas - (Intermediate Champions)

=== From S.F.C. ===
Relegated to 2019 Waterford I.F.C.

- Dungarvan

== Group stage ==
All 12 teams enter the competition at this stage. Groups are organised into three groups of four teams. The previous year's champions must enter Group 1, the previous year's runners-up must enter Group 2 while the two beaten semi-finalists will both enter Group 3.

The top placed team in each group will qualify directly for the quarter-finals joined by the 2nd placed team with the best group record. The best 2nd placed team shall be decided on following criteria: 1. Total points won in the group; 2. Best scoring difference; 3. Total scores for; 4. Total goals scored; 5. Where teams still cannot be separated, a draw shall take place. No play-offs shall be used.

The remaining eight teams shall then be divided into two pots. Pot A is to consist of the remaining 2nd placed teams plus the two 3rd placed teams with the best group record. The best 3rd placed teams shall be decided on the same criteria as outlined above. Pot B shall consist of the remaining 4 teams.

A draw will take place to give four matches with no repeat of group matches allowed. The four winners will advance to Quarter-Finals to oppose the four teams already qualified in a seeded draw. The four losers are to contest the relegation play-offs.

=== Group 1 ===
Team	Pld	W	L	D	PF	PA	PD	Pts
The Nire	3	3	0	0	54	24	+30	6
Rathgormack	3	2	1	0	66	33	+33	4
Ardmore	3	1	2	0	43	85	-42	2
Clashmore/Kinsalebeg	3	0	3	0	28	49	-21	0

Round 1

- The Nire 4-18, 1-3 Ardmore, 13/4/2019,
- Rathgormack 3-8, 3-4 Clashmore, 13/4/2019,

Round 2

- The Nire 2-3, 0-5 Clashmore, 18/4/2019,
- Rathgormack 7-15, 1-11 Ardmore, 20/4/2019,

Round 3

- The Nire 2-9, 1-10 Rathgormack, 14/7/2019,
- Ardmore 3-14, 3-10 Clashmore, 30/7/2019,

=== Group 2 ===
Team	Pld	W	L	D	PF	PA	PD	Pts
Stradbally	3	3	0	0	52	21	+31	6
Kilmacthomas	3	1	1	1	27	31	-4	3
Kilrossanty	3	1	1	1	35	41	-6	3
Portlaw	3	0	3	0	26	47	-21	0

Round 1

- Kilrossanty 0-16, 2-4 Portlaw, 13/4/2019,
- Stradbally 0-12, 1-2 Kilmacthomas, 14/4/2019,

Round 2

- Kilmacthomas 1-7, 0-7 Portlaw, 19/4/2019,
- Stradbally 1-16, 0-7 Kilrossanty, 19/4/2019,

Round 3

- Stradbally 2-15, 0-9 Portlaw, 14/7/2019,
- Kilmacthomas 1–9, 0-12 Kilrossanty, 14/7/2019,

=== Group 3 ===
Team	Pld	W	L	D	PF	PA	PD	Pts
Ballinacourty	3	3	0	0	37	15	+22	6
Gaultier	3	2	1	0	25	19	+6	4
An Rinn	3	1	2	0	18	26	-8	2
Brickey Rangers	3	0	3	0	16	36	-20	0

Round 1

- Gaultier 1-5, 1-4 An Rinn, 14/4/2018,
- Ballinacourty 1-16, 0-4 Brickey Rangers, 14/4/2018,

Round 2

- Ballinacourty 2-12, 1-8 An Rinn, 19/4/2019,
- Gaultier 2-11, 1-9 Brickey Rangers, 21/4/2019,

Round 3

- An Rinn w/o, scr Brickey Rangers, 5/7/2019,
- Ballinacourty w/o, scr Gaultier, 14/7/2019,

== Finals ==
=== Preliminary Quarter-Finals ===
All eight teams who failed to finish top of their group (except for the 2nd placed team with the best group record) shall enter the Preliminary Quarter-Finals. Teams are divided into two pots. Pot A is to consist of the remaining 2nd placed teams plus the two 3rd placed teams with the best group record. The best 3rd placed teams shall be decided on the same criteria as outlined above. Pot B shall consist of the remaining 4 teams.

A draw will take place to give four matches with no repeat of group matches allowed. The four winners will advance to Quarter-Finals to oppose the four teams already qualified in a seeded draw. The four losers are to contest the relegation play-offs.

- An Rinn 2-11, 0-6 Portlaw, Fraher Field, 10/8/2019,
- Clashmore/Kinsalebeg 0-15, 1-11 Kilmacthomas, Fraher Field, 15/8/2019,
- Gaultier 0-13, 0-10 Ardmore, Fraher Field, 18/8/2019,
- Kilrossanty 2-11, 1-11 Brickey Rangers, Fraher Field, 6/9/2019,

=== Quarter-finals ===
The three teams who topped their groups along with the best ranked 2nd placed team will face the four Preliminary Quarter-Final winners in the quarter-finals.

13 September 2019; Quarter-Final	Ballinacourty	4-6 - 3-5	Kilrossanty	Fraher Field, Waterford; Referee: ??? Man of the Match: ???

14 September 2019; Quarter-Final	Stradbally	3-15 - 2-12	Clashmore/Kinsalebeg	Fraher Field, Waterford; Referee: ??? Man of the Match: ???

15 September 2019; Quarter-Final	Rathgormack	2-12 - 1-13	Gaultier	Kill

15 September 2019; Quarter-Final	The Nire	1-15 - 2-11	An Rinn	Fraher Field, Waterford; Referee: ??? Man of the Match: ???

=== Semi-finals ===
6 October 2019; Semi-Final	Rathgormack	0-14 - 0-8	Stradbally	Fraher Field, Waterford; Referee: Tommy Sullivan

6 October 2019; Semi-Final	Ballinacourty	0-16 - 1-9	The Nire	Fraher Field, Waterford; Referee: ??? Man of the Match: ???

=== Final ===
20 October 2019; Final	Rathgormack	2-6 - 1-6	Ballinacourty	Fraher Field, Waterford; Referee: ??? Man of the Match: ???

== Relegation play-offs ==
The four losers from the Preliminary Quarter-Finals enter the Relegation Semi-Finals. The two winners of these Semi-Finals will secure their senior status for 2019 while the two losers will face each other in the Relegation Final. The winner of this match will secure their senior status for 2019 while the loser will be relegated to next year's I.F.C.

Relegation Semi-Finals:

- Ardmore 6-10, 0-5 Portlaw, Fraher Field, 13/9/2019,
- Kilmacthomas 1-13, 1-9 Brickey Rangers, Fraher Field, 15/9/2019,

Relegation Final:

- Brickey Rangers 1-9, 1-7 Portlaw, Fraher Field, 18/10/2019.
