= Davy Burke =

Irish Gaelic football manager

Personal information
- Native name: Dáithí de Búrca (Irish)

Sport
Club management
- Years: Club
- Until 2019 c. 2022: Sarsfields; Maynooth University
- 1
Inter-county management
- Years: Team
- 2019–2021 2022–2025: Wicklow; Roscommon

Davy Burke (born 5 February 1988) is a Gaelic football manager and former player. He was manager of the Roscommon county team between 2022 and 2025, having formerly managed Wicklow.

== Career ==
Burke's playing career (including underage with Kildare) was brought to an end by numerous injuries, including two torn cruciates and a cracked kneecap. He had a replacement plastic kneecap put in.

Burke, who is from County Kildare, managed Kildare to the 2018 All-Ireland Under-20 Football Championship. Appointed in November 2017, he resigned in October 2018. He then managed Maynooth in the Sigerson Cup. While managing Sarsfields of Newbridge in 2019 (he led them to the 2019 Kildare Senior Football Championship), Burke was mentioned as a possible Kildare senior manager before Jack O'Connor took the role. Burke was subsequently appointed Wicklow manager in September 2019 at the age of 31, becoming the youngest manager then active at this level of the sport. Burke was also the youngest senior inter-county manager to have ever been appointed. He expressed interest in recruiting players from other counties who have family ties to Wicklow. He departed as Wicklow manager in August 2021.

In October 2022, Burke was appointed as Roscommon manager for a three-year term. At the time of his appointment he was manager Maynooth University's Sigerson Cup team. He was 34 years of age. He stepped down in June 2025 at the end of that three-year term.

== Personal life ==
Burke is married.

Sporting positions
Preceded by John Evans	Wicklow Senior Football Manager; 2019–2021	Succeeded by Colin Kelly
Preceded by Anthony Cunningham	Roscommon Senior Football Manager; 2022–2025	Succeeded by Mark Dowd
