= 2019 Antrim Senior Football Championship =

Gaelic football competition

Antrim SFC
- Season: 2019
- Champions: Erin's Own Cargin (9th title)
- Relegated: St Mary's Ahoghill (11th in S.F.L.); St Teresa's (12th in S.F.L.)

The 2018 Antrim Senior Football Championship is the 117th official edition of Antrim GAA's premier club gaelic football tournament for senior clubs in County Antrim. 13 teams compete with the winners receiving the Padraig McNamee Cup and representing Antrim in the Ulster Senior Club Football Championship. The Antrim championship has a straight knock-out format.

Naomh Éanna and Gort na Móna returned to the S.F.C. this year after claiming the 2018 I.F.C. and I.F.L. titles respectively.

Erin's Own Cargin were the defending champions after they defeated Creggan Kickhams in the 2018 final.

St Mary's Ahoghill and St Teresa's were relegated after finishing 11th and 12th respectively in the S.F.L. They were replaced in 2020 by St James' (I.F.C. Champions) and O'Donovan Rossa (I.F.L. Champions).

On 12 October 2019, Erin's Own Cargin claimed their 9th S.F.C. and successfully defended their crown when defeating Lámh Dhearg 3-16 to 0-23 after extra time in the final replay at Corrigan Park.

== Team changes ==
=== Promoted from 2018 I.F.C. ===
- Naomh Eanna - (I.F.C. Champions)
- Gort na Móna - (I.F.L. Champions)

=== Relegated to 2019 I.F.C. ===
- St Joseph's Glenavy - (12th in S.F.L.)

== Preliminary round ==
- Aghagallon 2-11, 1-8 Naomh Éanna, Glenavy, 17/8/2019,

== Round 1 ==
7 of the 13 senior clubs play in this round. The 4 winners and the 4 teams who received byes compete in the quarter-finals. The 4 losing teams exit the championship.

- Lámh Dhearg 3-13, 1-6 Ahoghill, Corrigan Park, 24/8/2019,
- Aghagallon 2-15, 0-13 St Teresa's, Corrigan Park, 24/8/2019,
- Roger Casements Portglenone 1-10, 0-9 St Brigid's, Glenravel, 25/8/2019,
- O'Donovan Rossa 0-16, 0-9 Gort na Móna, Springfield Road, 25/9/2019,

== Quarter-finals ==
The four 2018 S.F.C. Semi-Finalists received a bye to this years Quarter-Finals.

- St Gall's 1-16, 1-9 Aghagallon, Creggan, 7/9/2019,
- Erin's Own Cargin 1-14, 0-12 O'Donovan Rossa, Creggan, 7/9/2019,
- Roger Casements Portglenone 0-12, 1-9 St John's, Ahoghill, 8/9/2019,
- Lámh Dhearg 1-13, 0-11 Creggan Kickhams, Glenavy, 8/9/2019,
- Roger Casements Portglenone 1-12, 2-6 St John's, Coláiste Feirste, 11/9/2019, (Replay),

== Semi-finals ==
| 21/9/2019; 17:30; Semi-Final | Lámh Dhearg | 2-13 - 3-10 | Roger Casement's Portglenone | Creggan; Referee: Darren McKeown |

| 22/9/2019; 17:30; Semi-Final | Erin's Own Cargin | 2-10 - 1-8 | St Gall's | Corrigan Park; Referee: Karol Doherty |

| 26/9/2019; 20:00; Semi-Final Replay | Lámh Dhearg | 0-15 - 1-12 (a.e.t.) | Roger Casement's Portglenone | The Dub, Queen's University Belfast; Referee: Colm McDonald |

- After extra-time had ended in a deadlock, a shootout was required to decide who would proceed to the final. With the score standing at 10-10 in sudden death and Lámh Dhearg forward and former county star Paddy Cunningham about to attempt to put his side back in front, Antrim chairman Ciaran McCavana ran onto the pitch and told him that that would be it for tonight. Another replay was called by the chairman after consenting both managers.

| 30/9/2019; 20:00; Semi-Final 2nd Replay | Lámh Dhearg | 2-8 - 0-9 | Roger Casement's Portglenone | Ballymena; Referee: Seán Laverty |

== Final ==
| 6/10/2019; 15:30; Final | Erin's Own Cargin | 1-10 - 0-13 | Lámh Dhearg | Corrigan Park; Referee: Seán Laverty |

| 12/10/2019; 16:00; Final replay | Erin's Own Cargin | 3-16 - 0-23 (a.e.t.) | Lámh Dhearg | Corrigan Park; Referee: Darren McKeown |
