= 2019 Tyrone Senior Football Championship =

Tyrone SFC
- Season: 2019
- Champions: Trillick St. Macartan's (8th Title)
- Relegated: Tattyreagh St. Patrick's (16th in S.F.L.); Edendork St. Malachy's (S.F.L. Relegation Playoff Loser); Eglish St. Patrick's (S.F.L./I.F.L. Relegation/Promotion Playoff Loser)
- Winning Captain: Stephen O'Donnell
- Man Of The Match: Rory Brennan
- Winning Manager: Nigel Seaney

The 2019 Tyrone Senior Football Championship is the 114th edition of Tyrone GAA's premier gaelic football tournament for clubs in Tyrone Senior Football League Division 1. 16 teams compete with the winners receiving the O'Neill Cup and representing Tyrone in the Ulster Senior Club Football Championship.

Coalisland Fianna were the defending champions after they defeated Killyclogher St. Mary's in the 2018 final. However the defence of their title came undone at the semi-final stage when losing to eventual champions Trillick St. Macartan's.

Tattyreagh St. Patrick's, Eglish St. Patrick's and Dungannon Thomas Clarke's returned to senior championship football in 2019.

Tattyreagh St. Patrick's made the straight drop back down to the Intermediate ranks when finishing bottom of the 2019 S.F.L. They were followed by Edendork St. Malachy's who lost their S.F.L. Relegation Playoff to Eglish St. Patrick's, who in turn were then relegated after losing their SFL/IFL promotion/relegation playoff to Loughmacrory St. Teresa's. I.F.C. and I.F.L. champions Galbally Pearse's and I.F.L. runners-up Pomeroy Plunkett's will also replace these relegated teams in 2020.

On 13 October 2019, Trillick St. Macartan's claimed their 8th S.F.C. crown and their first triumph since 2015 when defeating Errigal Ciarán by 0-12 to 2-4 in the final at Healy Park.

The draw for the 2019 S.F.C. was made on 28 February 2019.

== Format ==
The championship has a straight knock out structure. The 16 teams that take part in the championship are the 16 teams in the Senior Football League (SFL).

Relegation from SFC:

Either two or three teams are relegated each year from the SFC and SFL. The 16th placed team in the SFL is automatically relegated to the IFL. The 15th and 14th placed teams then play a SFL relegation playoff with the loser being relegated. The winner plays the winner of the IFL promotion playoffs - if they win, they remain in the SFC and SFL - if they lose they are relegated to the IFC and IFL. (The winner of the SFC can't be relegated. If the championship winner finishes in the bottom 3 in the league, the 13th placed team enters the relegation scenario.)

Promotion to SFC:

Either two or three teams are promoted to the SFC each year. The IFC champions and the IFL champions are automatically promoted to the senior grade (If a team wins the IFC and IFL, the 2nd placed team in the IFL are automatically promoted). 2nd, 3rd, 4th and 5th place in the IFL enter the IFL promotion semi-finals (If the IFC champions are placed in the top 5 the 6th placed team enter the IFL promotion semi-finals) with the eventual winner of the final earning the right to play the loser of the SFL relegation playoff in a relegation/promotion playoff.

== Team changes ==
The following teams have changed division since the 2018 championship season.

=== To S.F.C. ===
Promoted from 2018 Tyrone I.F.C.

- Tattyreagh St. Patrick's - (IFC Champions)
- Eglish St. Patrick's - (IFL Champions)
- Dungannon Thomas Clarke's - (SFL/IFL promotion/relegation playoff Winner)

=== From S.F.C. ===
Relegated to 2019 I.F.C.

- Aghyaran St. Davog's - (SFL/IFL promotion/relegation playoff Loser)
- Pomeroy Plunkett's - (SFL Relegation Loser)
- Galbally Pearses - (16th in SFL)

== Round 1 ==
All 16 teams enter Round 1 in a random open draw. The 8 losers are eliminated from the championship while the 8 winners proceed to the quarter-finals.

- Errigal Ciarán 0-15, 1-8 Eglish St. Patrick's, 30/8/2019,
- Edendork St. Malachy's 2-14, 0-8 Tattyreagh St. Patrick's, 31/8/2019,
- Omagh St. Enda's 1-13, 1-10 Dungannon Thomas Clarke's, 31/8/2019,
- Carrickmore St. Colmcille's 2-22, 1-11 Derrylaughan Kevin Barry's, 31/8/2019,
- Trillick St. Macartan's 4-12, 0-7 Dromore St. Dympna's, 6/9/2019,
- Killyclogher St. Mary's 2-13, 1-13 Donaghmore St. Patrick's, 7/9/2019,
- Clonoe O'Rahillys 1-17, 0-9 Moy Tir na nÓg, 7/9/2019,
- Coalisland 1-14, 0-12 Ardboe O'Donovan Rossa, 8/9/2019,

== Quarter-finals ==
- Carrickmore St. Colmcille's 0-11, 0-11 Edendork St. Malachy's, 20/9/2019,
- Errigal Ciarán 2-13, 1-10 Omagh St. Enda's, 21/9/2019,
- Trillick St. Macartan's 2-11, 1-9 Clonoe O'Rahillys, 22/9/2019,
- Coalisland Fianna 2-14, 1-8 Killyclogher St. Mary's, 22/9/2019,
- Carrickmore St. Colmcille's 2-12, 0-17 Edendork St. Malachy's, 24/9/2019, (Replay)

== Semi-finals ==
29 September 2019
1:30 pm
Semi-Final

Trillick St. Macartan's	0-13 - 0-12	Coalisland Fianna
	Report

Pomeroy
29 September 2019
5:00 pm
Semi-Final

Errigal Ciarán	1-11 - 0-9	Carrickmore St. Colmcille's
	Report

Dungannon

== Final ==
13 October 2019; 4:00 pm Final	Trillick St. Macartan's	0-12 - 2-4	Errigal Ciarán	Healy Park, Omagh
13 October 2019; 4:00 pm Final		Report		Healy Park, Omagh
