= 2026 Longford Senior Football Championship =

110th Longford Senior Football Championship

Tournament details
- County: Longford
- Province: Leinster
- Year: 2026
- Sponsor: Peter Hanley Motors
- Date: 16 July - 11 October 2026
- Teams: 11
- Defending champions: Killoe Young Emmets

Winners
- Champions: Clonguish (13th win)
- Manager: Dominic Corrigan
- Captain: Matthew Carey

Runners-up
- Runners-up: Killoe Young Emmets
- Manager: Paul O'Hara

Promotion/Relegation
- Relegated team(s): Carrickedmond; Rathcline

Other
- Matches played: 38
- Website: Longford GAA

The 2026 Longford Senior Football Championship is the 110th edition of Longford GAA's premier Gaelic football tournament for senior graded clubs in County Longford, Ireland. Eleven teams compete, with the winner representing Longford in the Leinster Senior Club Football Championship.

Killoe Young Emmets are the defending champions after defeating Colmcille in the previous years final. It was their 15th senior title.

Ardagh Moydow won their first Longford Intermediate Football Championship after defeating St Brigid's Killashee to be promoted to the S.F.C. Mostrim and Fr Manning Gaels finished in the bottom spots in the relegation group and therefore were relegated to the 2026 I.F.C.

The draw for the group stage of the championship was made on 11 May 2026.

== Championship Structure ==
The 2026 Longford S.F.C begins with a group stage consisting of two groups, each holding six teams in Group A and five teams in Group B. The top four teams in each group qualify for the quarter-finals while the rest of the teams play in a round robin stage, where the bottom two teams in that group are relegated to the 2027 I.F.C.

== Team Changes ==
The following teams have changed division since the 2025 championship season:

=== To S.F.C. ===
Promoted from 2025 Intermediate Football Championship

- Ardagh Moydow - (Intermediate Champions)

=== From S.F.C. ===
Relegated to 2026 Intermediate Football Championship

- Mostrim
- Fr Manning Gaels

== Participating teams ==
The teams competing in the 2026 Longford S.F.C are:

Club	Location	Pre C'ship Odds	2025 Championship Position	2026 Championship Position	In championship since	Championship Titles (Pre 2026)	Last Championship Title (Pre 2026)
Abbeylara	Abbeylara	16/1	Quarter-Finalist	Semi-Finalist	1995	3	2024
Ardagh Moydow	Ardagh & Moydow	33/1	I.F.C Champions	Quarter-Finalist	2026	4	1987
Carrickedmond	Carrickedmond	20/1	Quarter-Finalist	Relegated to 2027 I.F.C	2015	0	—
Clonguish	Newtown Forbes	6/4	Semi-Finalist	Champions	1998	12	2009
Colmcille	Aughnacliffe	15/8	Runners-Up	Quarter-Finalist	1987	7	2022
Dromard	Moyne	20/1	Quarter-Finalist	Semi-Finalist	1996	4	2007
Killoe Young Emmets	Killoe	15/8	Champions	Runners-Up	1978	15	2025
Longford Slashers	Longford	33/1	Relegation Group	Quarter-Finalist	Never Relegated	16	2013
Mullinalaghta St Columba's	Mullinalaghta	12/1	Quarter-Finalist	Relegation Group	2008	6	2021
Rathcline	Lanesborough	16/1	Semi-Finalist	Relegated to 2027 I.F.C	2020	1	1976
St Mary's Granard	Granard	16/1	Relegation Group	Quarter-Finalist	2013	11	1982

== Group Stage ==
=== Group A ===
Advance to knockout stage Advance to relegation group

Team	Matches				Score			Pts
Team	Pld	W	D	L	For	Against	Diff	Pts
Abbeylara	5	3	2	0	109	90	+19	8
Dromard	5	3	1	1	95	87	+8	7
Killoe Young Emmets	5	3	0	2	105	89	+16	6
Ardagh Moydow	5	1	2	2	88	100	-12	4
Mullinalaghta St Columba's	5	2	0	3	100	102	-2	4
Rathcline	4	0	1	4	73	102	-29	1

==== Round 1 ====
16 July 2026 Round 1	Mullinalaghta St Columba's	2-14 (20) – (22) 1-19	Killoe Young Emmets	Longford
20:00 IST (UTC+1)		(HT: 0-07 – 0-14)		Venue: Pearse Park
	Pts: Cian Mackey 1-6 (1pen), David McGiney 1-3 (2f), Donal McElligott 0-3, Aidan McElligott 0-1, Jayson Matthews 0-1	Report	Pts: Conor Mulligan 1-2, Cian Farrelly 0-5 (2tp), Daniel Mimnagh 0-4 (2f), Ronan McGoldrick 0-3 (1f), Gavin Farrelly 0-2, Davin Donnelly 0-1, Mark Hughes 0-1 (f)	Referee: Hugh O'Kane

17 July 2026 Round 1	Rathcline	2-11 (17) – (33) 3-24	Abbeylara	Longford
20:00 IST (UTC+1)		(HT: 1-06 – 3-11)		Venue: Pearse Park
	Pts: Oran Kenny 0-7 (2f), Shane Kenny 1-2, Oisín Kenny 1-0, Bryan Peters 0-2 (tp)	Report	Pts: Robbie Smith 0-7 (1tp, 3f), Dylan Ledwith 2-0, Nigel Rabitt 0-5 (2f), Cathal Gilligan 1-1, Fergal Battrim 0-3 (1tp), Seán Fagan 0-3, Jason Kelly 0-2, Colin Gilna 0-1, Caolan Lynch 0-1, JJ Reilly 0-1	Referee: Joe McDermott

18 July 2026 Round 1	Ardagh Moydow	2-12 (18) – (20) 0-20	Dromard	Monaduff
19:00 IST (UTC+1)		(HT: 2-07 – 0-07)
	Pts: Daryl Carrigy 0-6 (1tp), Jamie Connor 0-5 (2tpf), Killian Farrell 1-1, Dylan Coady 1-0 (pen)	Report	Pts: Joseph Hagan 0-12 (1tpf, 5f), Aaron Farrell 0-4, Fionn Hourican 0-3, Conor McGauran 0-1	Referee: Mark Glancy

==== Round 2 ====
24 July 2026 Round 2	Abbeylara	2-10 (16) – (16) 2-10	Ardagh Moydow	Edgeworthstown
20:00 IST (UTC+1)		(HT: 1-01 – 1-07)		Venue: Devine Park
	Pts: Cathal Gilligan 1-3, Michael McHugh 1-0, Robbie Smith 0-3 (1tpf), Nigel Rabbitt 0-1 (1f), Cian Brady 0-1, Ciarán Scanlon 0-1, Padraig Berry 0-1	Report	Pts: Darryl Carrigy 1-3, Jamie Connor 0-4 (2f), Eugene Murray 1-0, Diarmuid Farrell 0-1, Conor Hogan 0-1, Killian Farrell 0-1	Referee: Fergal Kelly

25 July 2026 Round 2	Dromard	2-13 (19) – (21) 1-18	Mullinalaghta St Columba's	Aughnacliffe
19:00 IST (UTC+1)		(HT: 2-06 – 0-07)		Venue: Fr. McGee Park
	Pts: Francis McGee 2-1 (1pen, 1f), Joseph Hagan 0-6 (2tp), Aaron Farrell 0-3, Peadar Kiernan 0-1, Daniel Conboy 0-1, William McEntire 0-1	Report	Pts: Dónal McElligott 1-3, David McGivney 0-5 (1tpf, 3f), Gary Rogers 0-3 (1tp), James McGivney 0-2 (tp), Jayson Matthews 0-2 (tp), Patrick Lynch 0-1, Conan Brady 0-1, Niall Woods 0-1	Referee: David Reynolds

25 July 2026 Round 2	Killoe Young Emmets	0-17 (17) – (11) 0-11	Rathcline	Ballymahon
19:00 IST (UTC+1)		(HT: 0-06 – 0-06)		Venue: Leo Casey Park
	Pts: Ronan McGoldrick 0-3 (2f), Daniel Mimnagh 0-2 (1f), Ronan Keogh 0-2, Enda Quinn 0-2, Davin Donnelly 0-2 (1f), Paddy Kiernan 0-2 (tp), James Moran 0-2 (tp), Cian Farrelly 0-1, Conor Mulligan 0-1	Report	Pts: Shane Kenny 0-4 (2tpf), Bryan Peters 0-4 (1tp), Oran Kenny 0-3 (1tp)	Referee: Francis Kelly

==== Round 3 ====
7 August 2026 Round 3	Killoe Young Emmets	3-11 (20) – (22) 1-19	Abbeylara	Aughnacliffe
20:00 IST (UTC+1)		(HT: 1-07 – 1-08)		Venue: Fr. McGee Park
	Pts: Ronan McGoldrick 1-1 (1f), Michael Hughes 0-4 (2tpf), Paddy Kiernan 1-0, Niall Farrelly 1-0, Davin Donnelly 0-3 (1tp), Cian Farrelly 0-1, Daniel Mimnagh 0-1 (f), Mickey Quinn 0-1	Report	Pts: Ciarán Scanlon 0-6 (2tpf, 1'45), Robbie Smyth 0-6 (2f, 1tp), Jason Kelly 1-0, Seán Fagan 0-2 (tp), Dylan Ledwith 0-2 (2f), Caolan Lynch 0-2, Cathal Gilligan 0-1	Referee: Mark Glancy

8 August 2026 Round 3	Mullinalaghta St Columba's	2-15 (21) – (23) 0-23	Ardagh Moydow	Higginstown
19:00 IST (UTC+1)		(HT: 2-08 – 0-18)
	Pts: David McGivney 0-7 (2tpf, 3f), Emmet Brady 1-1, Jayson Matthews 1-1, Dónal McElligott 0-3, Niall Woods 0-1, Shane Mulligan 0-1, Patrick Lynch 0-1	Report	Pts: Jamie Connor 0-7 (1tp, 1tpf, 1f, 1'45), Daryl Carrigy 0-4 (1tp), Dylan Coady 0-3 (1tp), Connor Hogan 0-3 (1tp), Emmet Donlon 0-2 (tp), Max Gallagher 0-2, Diarmuid Farrell 0-2	Referee: Joe McDermott

9 August 2026 Round 3	Dromard	1-15 (18) – (12) 1-09	Rathcline	Abbeylara
14:00 IST (UTC+1)		(HT: 0-07 – 0-06)		Venue: Oliver Lynch Park
	Pts: Joseph Hagan 0-4 (1tp, 1f), Aaron Farrell 0-4, William McEntire 1-0, Francis McGee 0-2 (1f), Ronan Bleakley 0-2, Ronan Corcoran 0-1, Dylan Vance 0-1, Peadar Kiernan 0-1	Report	Pts: Oran Kenny 0-4 (1f), Shane Kenny 0-3 (1tpf), Ryan Carberry 1-0, Harvey Myhill 0-1, Bryn Peters 0-1	Referee: David Tiernan

==== Round 4 ====
14 August 2026 Round 4	Ardagh Moydow	1-14 (17) – (29) 4-17	Killoe Young Emmets	Newtown Forbes
20:00 IST (UTC+1)		(HT: 0-03 – 1-08)		Venue: Allen Park
	Pts: Jamie Connor 0-7 (1tpf, 2f), Max Gallagher 1-0, Emmet Donlon 0-2 (tp), Dylan Coady 0-2 (tp), Darryl Carrigy 0-2 (1f), Connor Hogan 0-1	Report	Pts: Paddy Moran 1-6, Conor Mulligan 2-1, Ronan McGoldrick 1-4 (3f), James Moran 0-2, Cian Farrelly 0-2, Danny Mimnagh 0-1, Larry Moran 0-1 (f)	Referee: David Donohoe

15 August 2026 Round 4	Rathcline	2-13 (19) – (20) 0-20	Mullinalaghta St Columba's	Carrickedmond
19:00 IST (UTC+1)		(HT: 1-04 – 0-12)		Venue: Michael Moran Park
	Pts: Oran Kenny 1-5 (2tp, 1f), James Carroll 1-0, Shane Kenny 0-3 (1'45, 1f), Iarla O'Sullivan 0-2 (tp), Oisín Kenny 0-1, Garth O'Reilly 0-1, Ben Murphy 0-1	Report	Pts: David McGivney 0-5 (2tp, 1f), Jayson Matthews 0-4, Emmet Brady 0-3, Connor Leonard 0-2 (tp), Aaron Earley 0-2, Niall Woods 0-1, James McGivney 0-1, Donal McElligott 0-1, Aidan McElligott 0-1	Referee: David Reynolds

15 August 2026 Round 4	Abbeylara	0-19 (19) – (19) 2-13	Dromard	Killoe
19:00 IST (UTC+1)		(HT: 0-11 – 0-08)		Venue: Emmet Park
	Pts: Ciarán Scanlon 0-5 (2tpf), Robert Smyth 0-5 (1tp, 2f), Karl O'Hara 0-2 (tp), Jason Kelly 0-2 (1f), Seán Fagan 0-2 (tp), Colin Gilna 0-1, Fergal Battrim 0-1, Dylan Ledwith 0-1	Report	Pts: Joseph Hagan 0-7 (1tp, 1'45, 2f), Ronan Corcoran 2-0, Aaron Farrell 0-4, Ronan Bleakley 0-1, Donnacha Reynolds 0-1	Referee: David Tiernan

==== Round 5 ====
29 August 2026 Round 5	Rathcline	1-11 (14) – (14) 0-14	Ardagh Moydow	Longford
19:00 IST (UTC+1)		(HT: 1-08 – 0-02)		Venue: Michael Fay Park
	Pts: Oran Kenny 1-4 (2f), Shane Kenny 0-3 (1tpf), Bryn Peters 0-2, Iarla O'Sullivan 0-1, Ben Murphy 0-1	Report	Pts: Jamie Connor 0-6 (2tpf, 1f), Daryl Carrigy 0-3, Killian Farrell 0-2 (2f), Max Gallagher 0-1, Dylan Coady 0-1, Connor Hogan 0-1	Referee: Michael Farrell

29 August 2026 Round 5	Killoe Young Emmets	1-14 (17) – (19) 1-16	Dromard	Monaduff
19:00 IST (UTC+1)		(HT: 0-07 – 1-09)
	Pts: Ronan McGoldrick 0-7 (4f), James Moran 1-0, Micheal Hughes 0-3 (1'45, 1tpf), Daniel Mimnagh 0-2, Eamon Keogh 0-1, Davin Donnelly 0-1	Report	Pts: Joseph Hagan 1-4 (2f), Aaron Farrell 0-4, Francis McGee 0-3 (2f), Matt Duffy 0-2, Ollie Duffy 0-2 (tpf), Cormac Mulligan 0-1	Referee: Francis Kelly

29 August 2026 Round 5	Mullinalaghta St Columba's	1-15 (18) – (19) 1-16	Abbeylara	Higginstown
19:00 IST (UTC+1)		(HT: 1-04 – 0-11)
	Pts: David McGivney 0-8 (3tpf, 1f), Aron Earley 1-0, Jayson Matthews 0-2, Cian Mackey 0-2, Gary Rogers 0-2, Emmet Brady 0-1	Report	Pts: Robbie Smyth 1-6 (2tp, 1f, 1pen), Seán Fagan 0-5 (2tp), Cathal Gilligan 0-2, Caolan Lynch 0-2 (tp), Ciarán Scanlon 0-1 (f)	Referee: Hugh O'Kane

=== Group B ===
Advance to knockout stage Advance to relegation group

Team	Matches				Score			Pts
Team	Pld	W	D	L	For	Against	Diff	Pts
Clonguish	4	4	0	0	89	62	+27	8
St Mary's Granard	4	3	0	1	70	58	+12	6
Colmcille	4	2	0	2	69	74	-5	4
Longford Slashers	4	1	0	3	67	77	-10	2
Carrickedmond	4	0	0	4	60	84	-24	0

==== Round 1 ====
17 July 2026 Round 1	St Mary's Granard	2-13 (19) – (9) 0-09	Colmcille	Ballinalee
20:00 IST (UTC+1)		(HT: 0-08 – 0-04)		Venue: Maguire Park
	Pts: Jamie Brady Hynes 1-1, Darren Gallagher 0-4 (1'45, 1tpf), Ben Blessington 1-0, Eoin O'Hara 0-2, Brendan Martin 0-2, Liam Sullivan 0-1, Cian O'Donnell 0-1, David Callaghan 0-1, Jordan Martin 0-1	Report	Pts: Barry McKeon 0-6 (1f, 1tp, 1tpf), Dylan McCabe 0-1, Cathal McCabe 0-1, Luke Donnelly 0-1	Referee: Fergal Kelly

18 July 2026 Round 1	Carrickedmond	1-09 (12) – (24) 4-12	Longford Slashers	Dunbeggan
19:00 IST (UTC+1)		(HT: 1-05 – 2-05)
	Pts: Brian Mulvey 0-5 (2f), Cormac Mulvey 1-0, Seán Kelly 0-3, Aidan McGuire 0-1	Report	Pts: Robbie Clarke 2-1 (1f), Eoin McGuinness 0-6 (3tpf), Seán Clarke 1-1, Ronan Sheahan Jnr 1-1, Darragh O'Connell 0-1, Tadhg McNevin 0-1, David O'Brien 0-1	Referee: David Donohoe

==== Round 2 ====
23 July 2026 Round 2	Clonguish	0-21 (21) – (15) 1-12	St Mary's Granard	Longford
20:00 IST (UTC+1)		(HT: 0-10 – 0-07)		Venue: Pearse Park
	Pts: Matthew Flynn 0-8 (1tp), Jack Duggan 0-5 (1tp, 1tpf), Matthew Carey 0-4 (1f), James Hagan 0-3, Mark Cooney 0-1	Report	Pts: Darren Gallagher 1-4 (1tpf, 1'45), Jamie Brady Hynes 0-4 (1f), Cian O'Donnell 0-2 (tp), Jordan Martin 0-1, Brendan Martin 0-1	Referee: David Donohoe

24 July 2026 Round 2	Colmcille	1-16 (19) – (18) 2-12	Carrickedmond	Killoe
20:00 IST (UTC+1)		(HT: 0-09 – 2-07)		Venue: Emmet Park
	Pts: Barry McKeon 0-9 (5f), Keelan Hudson 1-0, Eoin Hawkins 0-3 (1tp), Aaron Smyth 0-1, Declan Reilly 0-1, Fergal Sheridan 0-1, Cathal McCabe 0-1	Report	Pts: Liam Glennon 1-3, Kyle Kenny 1-0, Eoghán McCormack 0-2, Aidan McGuire 0-2, Brian Mulvey 0-2, Seán Egan 0-1, Enda Farrell 0-1, Cormac Mulvey 0-1	Referee: David Tiernan

==== Round 3 ====
7 August 2026 Round 3	Carrickedmond	1-09 (12) – (21) 1-18	Clonguish	Keenagh
20:00 IST (UTC+1)		(HT: 1-05 – 0-07)		Venue: McGann Park
	Pts: Cormac Mulvey 1-0 (1-0f), Liam Glennon 0-3 (1tp), Eoghan McCormack 0-3 (1tp), Brian Mulvey 0-3 (2f)	Report	Pts: Matthew Carey 1-7 (1pen, 1tpf, 3f), Michael Flynn 0-4 (2f), Matthew Flynn 0-2, Chris Gordan 0-1, Cormac Flynn 0-1, Andrew Flynn 0-1, James Hagan 0-1, Daniel Carey 0-1	Referee: Michael Farrell

9 August 2026 Round 3	Longford Slashers	2-12 (17) – (22) 2-16	Colmcille	Newtown Forbes
18:00 IST (UTC+1)		(HT: 0-07 – 1-06)		Venue: Allen Park
	Pts: Coyle Clyne 1-0, Davy O'Brien 1-0, Darragh O'Connell 0-3 (1tp), Billy Maguire 0-2 (tp), Ronan Sheahan Jnr 0-2, Ben Lynn 0-1, Peter Lynn 0-1, Robbie Clarke 0-1 (f), Tadhg McNevin 0-1, Colm Farrell 0-1 (f)	Report	Pts: Barry McKeon 0-4 (1tp, 1f), Conor Grant 1-0, Keelan Hudson 1-0, Cathal Reilly 0-3, Jack Macken 0-3 (1tp, 1f), Eoin Hawkins 0-3 (1tp), Dylan McCabe 0-1, Luke Donnelly 0-1, Vinny Hourican 0-1	Referee: Francis Kelly

==== Round 4 ====
15 August 2026 Round 4	Clonguish	0-27 (27) – (16) 2-10	Longford Slashers	Monaduff
19:00 IST (UTC+1)		(HT: 0-10 – 1-03)
	Pts: Matthew Carey 0-14 (4tpf, 1'45, 2f), James Hagan 0-3, Cormac Flynn 0-2, Matthew Flynn 0-2, Chris Gordon 0-1, Andrew Flynn 0-1, Kevin Baskett 0-1, Ronan Sweeney 0-1, Jonathan Burke 0-1, Daniel Carey 0-1	Report	Pts: Daire O'Brien 1-1, Seán Clarke 0-4 (3f), Michael Mulcahy 1-0, Eoin McGuinness 0-2 (tpf), Darragh O'Connell 0-2 (tp), Peter Lynn 0-1	Referee: Joe McDermott

16 August 2026 Round 4	St Mary's Granard	2-14 (20) – (18) 1-15	Carrickedmond	Moyne
18:00 IST (UTC+1)		(HT: 0-09 – 1-09)		Venue: Páirc na nGael
	Pts: Cian O'Donnell 0-8 (1tpf, 1tp, 1f), Brendan Martin 1-1, David Callaghan 1-0, Jamie Brady Hynes 0-3 (1f), Darren Gallagher 0-1, Ben Blessington 0-1	Report	Pts: Brian Mulvey 1-6 (2tpf), Kyle Kenny 0-3 (1tp), Seán Kelly 0-2 (tp), Aidan McGuire 0-2, Liam Glennon 0-1, Eoghan McCormack 0-1	Referee: Hugh O'Kane

==== Round 5 ====
30 August 2026 Round 5	St Mary's Granard	0-16 (16) – (10) 0-10	Longford Slashers	Ardagh
14:30 IST (UTC+1)		(HT: 0-10 – 0-03)		Venue: Keenen Park
	Pts: Cian O'Donnell 0-4 (1tpf, 1f), Michael Hynes 0-3, Eoin O'Hara 0-3, Jamie Brady Hynes 0-3 (1f), Darren Gallagher 0-2, David Callaghan 0-1	Report	Pts: Peter Lynn 0-2 (tp), Seán Clarke 0-2 (1f), Robbie Clarke 0-1 (f), Ronan Sheahan Snr 0-1, Ronan Sheahan Jnr 0-1, Seán Morgan 0-1, Darragh O'Connell 0-1, James Shannon 0-1	Referee: Mark Glancy

30 August 2026 Round 5	Clonguish	2-14 (20) – (19) 2-13	Colmcille	Abbeylara
14:30 IST (UTC+1)		(HT: 2-06 – 2-07)		Venue: Oliver Lynch Park
	Pts: Matthew Flynn 1-2, James Hagan 1-2, Matthew Carey 0-4 (4f), Jonathan Burke 0-2, Ronan Sweeney 0-1, Peter Hanley 0-1, Cormac Flynn 0-1, Jack Duggan 0-1	Report	Pts: Barry McKeon 1-4 (1tp), Jack Madden 0-6 (2tpf, 2f), Cathal McCabe 1-1, Luke Donnelly 0-1, Eoin Hawkins 0-1	Referee: David Tiernan

== Relegation Group ==
The top four teams from each group qualify for the quarter-finals. The rest of the teams partake in a round robin group stage where the bottom two teams are relegated to the 2027 I.F.C.

Stay within S.F.C Relegated to 2027 I.F.C

Team	Matches				Score			Pts
Team	Pld	W	D	L	For	Against	Diff	Pts
Mullinalaghta St Columba's	2	1	1	0	40	38	+2	3
Carrickedmond	2	1	0	1	31	32	-1	2
Rathcline	2	0	1	1	36	37	-1	1

=== Round 1 ===
4 September 2026 Relegation Playoff - Round 1	Rathcline	1-11 (14) – (15) 1-12	Carrickedmond	Keenagh
20:00 IST (UTC+1)		(HT: 1-05 – 1-03)		Venue: McGann Park
	Pts: Shane Kenny 0-4 (2f, 1tp), Garth O'Reilly 1-0, Oran Kenny 0-2, Ryan Carberry 0-2, Jakub Kajan 0-1, Oisín Kenny 0-1, Iarla O'Sullivan 0-1	Report	Pts: Brian Mulvey 0-7 (1tpf, 4f), Seán Kelly 1-2, John McCormack 0-2 (tp), Aidan McGuire 0-1	Referee: David Reynolds

=== Round 2 ===
11 September 2026 Relegation Playoff - Round 2	Mullinalaghta St Columba's	2-16 (22) – (22) 2-16	Rathcline	Keenagh
20:00 IST (UTC+1)		(HT: 0-08 – 1-07)		Venue: McGann Park
	Pts: Aidan McElligott 1-3, David McGivney 1-2 (1tpf), Jayson Matthews 0-5, Niall Woods 0-1, Michael Cunningham 0-1, Shane Mulligan 0-1, Conan Brady 0-1, Donal McElligott 0-1, Aron Earley 0-1	Report	Pts: Oran Kenny 1-6 (1tpf, 1f), Garth O'Reilly 1-0, Iarla O'Sullivan 0-3 (1tp), David Rooney 0-2 (tp), Ben Murphy 0-2, Oisín Kenny 0-2 (tp), Bryn Peters 0-1	Referee: David Tiernan

=== Round 3 ===
18 September 2026 Relegation Playoff - Round 3	Carrickedmond	1-13 (16) – (18) 1-15	Mullinalaghta St Columba's	Newtown Forbes
20:00 IST (UTC+1)		(HT: 0-06 – 1-08)		Venue: Allen Park
	Pts: Aidan McGuire 1-1, Eoghan McCormack 0-4 (1tp), Brian Mulvey 0-4 (1tp, 2f), Liam Glennon 0-2, Cormac Mulvey 0-2	Report	Pts: David McGivney 0-6 (5f), Cian Mackey 1-1, Gary Rogers 0-3 (1tp), Donal McElligott 0-1, Emmet Brady 0-1, Jayson Matthews 0-1, Aidan McElligott 0-1, Patrick Lynch 0-1	Referee: Joe McDermott

== Knock-out Stage ==
=== Bracket ===
Quarter-finals
12 September, Longford
St Mary's Granard	0-09
Killoe Young Emmets	1-08
12 September, Longford
Abbeylara	2-15
Longford Slashers	1-11
13 September, Longford
Dromard	2-19
Colmcille	1-18
13 September, Longford
Clonguish	2-18
Ardagh Moydow	0-16

Semi-finals
26 September, Longford
Killoe Young Emmets	1-21
Abbeylara	0-12
3 October, Longford
Dromard	0-10
Clonguish	2-12

Final
11 October, Longford
Killoe Young Emmets
Clonguish

=== Quarter-Finals ===
12 September 2026 Quarter-Final	St Mary's Granard	0-09 (9) – (11) 1-08	Killoe Young Emmets	Longford
16:30 IST (UTC+1)		(HT: 0-03 – 0-03)		Venue: Pearse Park
	Pts: Cian O'Donnell 0-6 (2tpf, 1f), Patrick McGivney 0-1, Brady Hynes 0-1, Ben Blessington 0-1	Report	Pts: Gavin Farrelly 1-2, Davin Donnelly 0-3 (1f), Micheal Hughes 0-1 ('45), Niall Farrelly 0-1, Daniel Mimnagh 0-1	Referee: Joe McDermott

12 September 2026 Quarter-Final	Abbeylara	2-15 (21) – (14) 1-11	Longford Slashers	Longford
18:15 IST (UTC+1)		(HT: 0-08 – 1-06)		Venue: Pearse Park
	Pts: Cathal Gilligan 1-4, Ciarán Scanlon 0-5 (1f), Jason Kelly 1-1, Caolan Lynch 0-2 (tp), Robbie Smyth 0-2 (2f), Dylan Ledwith 0-1	Report	Pts: Seán Clarke 1-1, Robbie Clarke 0-4 (3f), Peter Lynn 0-2, Eoin McGuinness 0-2 (tpf), Mícheál Mulcahy 0-1, Ronan Sheahan Jnr 0-1	Referee: David Tiernan

13 September 2026 Quarter-Final	Dromard	2-19 (25) – (21) 1-18	Colmcille	Longford
14:30 IST (UTC+1)		(HT: 1-11 – 0-11)		Venue: Pearse Park
	Pts: Matt Duffy 2-1, Aaron Farrell 0-6 (2tp), Fionn Hourican 0-4 (2tp), Joseph Hagan 0-3, Francis McGee 0-3 (1tp), Ronan Bleakley 0-1, Ronan Corcoran 0-1	Report	Pts: Jack Macken 0-8 (1tp, 1tpf, 4f), Keelan Hudson 1-0, Luke Donnelly 0-3 (1tp), Dylan McCabe 0-2, Eoghan Williams 0-1, Ciarán McKeon 0-1, Seán Smith 0-1, Eoin Hawkins 0-1, Barry McKeon 0-1 (f)	Referee: David Donohoe

13 September 2026 Quarter-Final	Clonguish	2-18 (24) – (16) 0-16	Ardagh Moydow	Longford
16:15 IST (UTC+1)		(HT: 2-08 – 0-06)		Venue: Pearse Park
	Pts: Christopher Gordon 2-0, Matthew Carey 0-6 (3f, 1'45), Michael Flynn 0-5 (4f), Kevin Baskett 0-2, James Hagan 0-2, Jamie Dorr 0-1, Jack Duggan 0-1, Daniel Carey 0-1	Report	Pts: Jamie Connor 0-5 (2tpf, 1f), Killian Farrell 0-5 (2f), Connor Hogan 0-4 (2tp), Max Gallagher 0-1, Daryl Carrigy 0-1	Referee: Hugh O'Kane

=== Semi-Finals ===
26 September 2026 Semi-Final	Killoe Young Emmets	1-21 (24) – (12) 0-12	Abbeylara	Longford
17:15 IST (UTC+1)		(HT: 0-14 – 0-07)		Venue: Pearse Park
	Pts: Mikey Quinn 1-4 (2tp), Davin Donnelly 0-6 (3tp), Daniel Mimnagh 0-3, Micheal Hughes 0-2 (tpf), Eamon Keogh 0-2, Enda Quinn 0-2, Ronan McGoldrick 0-2 (2f)	Report	Pts: Robbie Smyth 0-5 (4f), Cathal Gilligan 0-2, Mel Brady 0-2 (tp), Ciarán Scanlon 0-1 (f), Seán Fagan 0-1, Jason Kelly 0-1	Referee: Francis Kelly

27 September 2026 Semi-Final	Dromard	2-07 (13) – (13) 1-10	Clonguish	Longford
16:15 IST (UTC+1)		(HT: 1-03 – 0-08)		Venue: Pearse Park
	Pts: Joseph Hagan 0-6 (1tp, 3f), Aaron Farrell 1-0, Cormac Mulligan 1-0, Ronan Corcoran 0-1	Report	Pts: Matthew Carey 0-5, Cormac Flynn 1-1, Michael Flynn 0-4 (2f)	Referee: David Donohoe

=== Semi-Final Replay ===
3 October 2026 Semi-Final Replay	Clonguish	2-12 (18) – (10) 0-10	Dromard	Longford
17:00 IST (UTC+1)		(HT: 0-08 – 0-05)		Venue: Pearse Park
	Pts: Cormac Flynn 1-2, Michael Flynn 0-5 (1f), Mark Cooney 1-0, Matthew Carey 0-2 (2f), Peter Hanley 0-1, Matthew Flynn 0-1, Daniel Carey 0-1	Report	Pts: Joseph Hagan 0-6 (2tpf, 1f), Aaron Farrell 0-3 (1tp), Francis McGee 0-1 (f)	Referee: Joe McDermott

=== Final ===
As reigning champions, Killoe Young Emmets were looking to win their 2nd title in a row and their 3rd in the space of four years. A win would give Killoe their 16th title.

Clonguish entered their first final since 2023 and were looking to win their first SFC title since 2009 and a 13th title to their roll of honour.

Both teams have only played each other in one final which was in 2023, where Killoe won 1-08 to 0-10.

Clonguish entered as 8/11 favourites, with Killoe as 5/4 underdogs.

11 October 2026
16:00 IST (UTC+1)
Final

Report

Killoe Young Emmets	1-06 (9) – (23) 1-20	Clonguish
(HT: 1-02 – 0-10)
Pts: Gavin Farrelly 1-0, Paddy Kiernan 0-2 (tp), Liam Hughes 0-1, Ryan Keogh 0-1, Davin Donnelly 0-1, Daniel Mimnagh 0-1 ('45)		Pts: Michael Flynn 1-9 (1f, 2tp), James Hagan 0-5 (1f), Chris Gordan 0-2, Kevin Baskett 0-1, Cormac Flynn 0-1, Matthew Carey 0-1 ('45), Jamie Dorr 0-1

Pearse Park, Longford
Referee: David Tiernan

Killoe Young Emmets	Clonguish
