= 2020 Longford Senior Football Championship =

Longford S.F.C.
- Season: 2020
- Champions: Killoe (13th title)
- Relegated: None
- Winning Captain: Daniel Mimnagh
- Man of the Match: Mickey Quinn
- Winning Manager: Thomas Donohoe
- Matches: 19

The 2020 Longford Senior Football Championship was the 104th running of the Longford GAA's premier club Gaelic football tournament for senior graded teams in County Longford, Ireland since the first County Championship was held in 1890 (103 completed since 1890, 1 started but not completed in 1891). The 2020 tournament was originally supposed to consist of 10 teams, but due to the impact of the COVID-19 pandemic on Gaelic games, a total of 12 teams competed this year (due to Rathcline and St Mary's Granard receiving a reprieve from relegation to the 2020 I.F.C.). The championship started with a group stage and then progressed to a knock out stage.

Killoe Young Emmets were the defending champions after they had defeated Longford Slashers in the previous year's final. However the Killoe club received a 48-week ban from the Longford Hearing Committee in August 2020 which would have ruled them out of defending their title in 2020. The ban was appealed to, and deemed illegitimate and quashed by, the GAA's Dispute Resolution Authority (DRA) in September 2020.

This year was Fr. Manning Gaels' return to the top-flight for the first time since the 2017 season after claiming the 2019 Longford I.F.C. title.

Rathcline and St Mary's Granard were supposed to be relegated to the I.F.C. for 2020. However, due to the emergence of the COVID-19 pandemic and the desire to maintain a 12 team S.F.C. for the 2020 Championship, the two clubs were given a reprieve.

Killoe Young Emmets claimed their 13th Senior Football Championship title with victory over Longford Slashers by 0-13 to 1-8 in the delayed 2020 county final played on 29 August 2021. (Note: It was the first time the SFC final was played in a different year to the designated season since the final of 1946 which was delayed and ran into 1947 due to the harvest crisis and various objections that year)

== Covid 19 impact ==
Due to the Covid-19 global pandemic, spectator numbers at group matches were restricted due to requirement for social distancing. By the knock-out stages, spectators were not allowed to attend matches at all, and by mid September spectators were limited to maximum of 200. Most of the 2020 Senior Football Championship was streamed live for the first time to allow supporters who could not attend games to watch the games live via the 'An Longfort TV' online streaming service. The semi-final stages of the Longford Senior Football Championship were postponed following an announcement on 25 September 2020 of two positive Covid-19 cases within the Killoe club. Those two positives were announced as active members of a GAA club, however the source was not GAA related. Public Health Authorities were liaising with the club and players in question and the work involved in contact tracing then commenced. The County board made the decision to postpone the Senior Championship Semi-final games as well as the Intermediate Football Final too. All games were re-arranged for alternate dates in early October 2020. However just before the semi-final games were due to be played, the GAA announced on 5 October that all club activity nationwide would be halted due to Covid-19 spread. The Longford County Board announced later in October 2020 that all unfinished competition which had started in 2020 (including the Senior Football Championship) would conclude in 2021 instead. The semi-finals of the 2020 Longford Senior Football Championship resumed on 21 and 22 August 2021 and the 2020 County Final was played on 29 August 2021.

== Team changes ==
The following teams had changed division since the 2019 championship season.

=== To S.F.C. ===
Promoted from 2019 I.F.C.

- Fr. Manning Gaels - (Intermediate Champions)

=== From S.F.C. ===
Relegated to 2020 I.F.C.

- None

== Group stage ==
There were 12 teams spread across Groups 1, 2, 3 and 4. The top two finishers in each group qualified for the quarter-finals, with pairings decided by open draw. The bottom finishers of each group did not progress and there was no Relegation Play-off in 2020 (relegation & promotion was scrapped due to the COVID-19 pandemic). All games were played at neutral venues.

=== Group 1 ===
| Team | Pld | W | L | D | PF | PA | PD | Pts |
|---|---|---|---|---|---|---|---|---|
| Mullinalaghta St Columba's | 2 | 1 | 1 | 0 | 37 | 24 | +13 | 3 |
| Colmcille | 2 | 1 | 1 | 0 | 27 | 22 | +5 | 3 |
| Rathcline | 2 | 0 | 0 | 2 | 24 | 42 | -18 | 0 |

Round 1:

- Colmcille 0-11, 0-11 Mullinalaghta St Columba's, 9/8/2020,

Round 2:

- Mullinalaghta St Columba's 4-14, Rathcline 1-10, 15/8/2020,

Round 3:

- Colmcille 2-10, Rathcline 0-11, 21/8/2020,

=== Group 2 ===
| Team | Pld | W | L | D | PF | PA | PD | Pts |
|---|---|---|---|---|---|---|---|---|
| Killoe Young Emmets | 2 | 2 | 0 | 0 | 29 | 23 | +6 | 4 |
| Mostrim | 2 | 0 | 1 | 1 | 32 | 33 | -1 | 1 |
| Clonguish | 2 | 0 | 1 | 1 | 27 | 32 | -5 | 1 |

Round 1:

- Killoe Young Emmets 0-14, 0-9 Clonguish, 7/8/2020,

Round 2:

- Clonguish 2-12, Mostrim 1-15, 16/8/2020,

Round 3:

- Killoe Young Emmets 2-9, Mostrim 0-14, 11/9/2020,

=== Group 3 ===
| Team | Pld | W | L | D | PF | PA | PD | Pts |
|---|---|---|---|---|---|---|---|---|
| Longford Slashers | 2 | 2 | 0 | 0 | 34 | 15 | +19 | 4 |
| Fr. Manning Gaels | 2 | 1 | 0 | 1 | 23 | 34 | -11 | 2 |
| Carrickedmond | 2 | 0 | 0 | 2 | 19 | 27 | -8 | 0 |

Round 1:

- Longford Slashers 2-16, 0-8 Fr. Manning Gaels, 8/8/2020,

Round 2:

- Carrickedmond 0-12, Fr. Manning Gaels 1-12, 14/8/2020,

Round 3:

- Longford Slashers 1-9, Carrickedmond 0-7, 22/8/2020,

=== Group 4 ===
| Team | Pld | W | L | D | PF | PA | PD | Pts |
|---|---|---|---|---|---|---|---|---|
| St Mary's Granard | 2 | 1 | 1 | 0 | 29 | 23 | +6 | 3 |
| Abbeylara | 2 | 1 | 0 | 1 | 23 | 26 | -3 | 2 |
| Dromard | 2 | 0 | 1 | 1 | 25 | 28 | -3 | 1 |

Round 1:

- Dromard 0-14, 1-11 St Mary's Granard, 8/8/2020,

Round 2:

- Abbeylara 1-6, St Mary's Granard 1-12, 15/8/2020,

Round 3:

- Abbeylara 0-14, Dromard 0-11, 28/8/2020,

== Knockout stage ==
The winners and runners up of each group qualify for the quarter-finals. Semi-final and final stages played in 2021 due to impact of Covid-19 pandemic.

| Quarter-finals (2020) | | Semi-finals (2021) | | Final (2021) |
| Abbeylara | 0-10 |
| Mostrim | 1-14 | Mostrim | 1-6 |
| Killoe Young Emmets | 1-13 | Killoe Young Emmets | 1-20 |
| St Mary's Granard | 1-8 | | | Killoe Young Emmets | 0-13 |
| Colmcille | 2-10 | | | Longford Slashers | 1-8 |
| Mullinalaghta | 1-15 | Mullinalaghta | 1-7 |
| Longford Slashers | 1-9 | Longford Slashers | 1-9 |
| Fr. Manning Gaels | 1-7 |

== Quarter-finals ==
| 6 September 2020; 5:30pm Quarter-final | Mullinalaghta St Columba's | 1-15 : 2-10 | Colmcille | Pearse Park; Attendance: Nil (Covid-19); Referee: Fergal Kelly |

| 6 September 2020; 8pm Quarter-final | Longford Slashers | 1-9 : 1-7 | Fr. Manning Gaels | Pearse Park; Attendance: Nil (Covid-19); Referee: Mark Glancy |
| 6 September 2020; 8pm Quarter-final | Colm Farrell (0-1), Sean Clarke (0-1), Andrew Kelly (0-2), Robbie Clarke (0-1), Peter Lynn (0-1), Darragh O’Connell (1-2), Colin Smith (0-1) | | Anthony Kane (0-1), Pauric Gill (0-1), Martin Cassidy (1-5) | Pearse Park; Attendance: Nil (Covid-19); Referee: Mark Glancy |

| 20 September 2020; 4pm Quarter-final | Abbeylara | 0-10 : 1-14 | Mostrim | Pearse Park; Attendance: Nil (Covid-19); Referee: David Tiernan |
| 20 September 2020; 4pm Quarter-final | Connor Berry (0-1), Cian Brady (0-1), Ciaran Scanlon (0-1); Robbie Smyth (0-2), Cathal Gilligan (0-2). | | Seamus Hannon (0-1), Alan O’Hara (0-2), Cillian Lynn (0-1), Tiarnan Hussey (0-1); Padraig Joyce (1-2), Brian Farrell (0-2), Darragh Doherty (0-5). | Pearse Park; Attendance: Nil (Covid-19); Referee: David Tiernan |

| 20 September 2020; 1pm Quarter-final | St Mary's Granard | 1-8 : 1-13 | Killoe Young Emmets | Pearse Park; Attendance: Nil (Covid-19); Referee: Hugh O Kane |
| 20 September 2020; 1pm Quarter-final | Darren Gallagher (1-3), Jordan Martin (0-4), Liam Sullivan (0-1). | | Denis McGoldrick (0-1), Daniel Mimnagh (0-1), Cian Farrelly; Mark Hughes (0-6), Larry Moran (0-3), Ciaran Donohoe (1-1), Euan Finneran (0-1). | Pearse Park; Attendance: Nil (Covid-19); Referee: Hugh O Kane |

== Semi-finals ==
| 21 August 2021; 6pm Semi-final | Mostrim | 1-6 : 1-20 | Killoe Young Emmets | Pearse Park; Attendance: 500 Max (Covid-19); Referee: Fergal Kelly |
| 21 August 2021; 6pm Semi-final | Brian Farrell (0-2), Seamus Hannon (0-1), Padraig Joyce (0-2), Tiarnan Hussey (1-1) | Report | Michael Quinn (0-1), Cian Farrelly (0-1), Euan Finneran (0-3), Eamon Keogh (0-1), Mark Hughes (0-11), Ciaran Donohoe (1-3) | Pearse Park; Attendance: 500 Max (Covid-19); Referee: Fergal Kelly |

| 22 August 2021; 6pm Semi-final | Longford Slashers | 1-9 : 1-7 | Mullinalaghta St Columba's | Pearse Park; Attendance: 500 Max (Covid-19); Referee: Patrick Maguire |
| 22 August 2021; 6pm Semi-final | Gerard Flynn (1-1), Barry Gilleran, Peter Lynn (0-1), Robbie O’Connell (0-2), Andrew Kelly (0-3), Sean Clarke (0-2) | Report | Francis Mulligan (0-1), David McGivney (0-1), Jayson Matthews (1-1), Rian Brady (0-4) | Pearse Park; Attendance: 500 Max (Covid-19); Referee: Patrick Maguire |

== Final ==
| 29 August 2021; 3pm Final | Killoe Young Emmets | 0-13 : 1:8 | Longford Slashers | Pearse Park; Attendance: 1500 Max (Covid-19); Referee: Aiden Dowler; Man of the Match: Mickey Quinn |
| 29 August 2021; 3pm Final | Ryan Moffatt (0-1), Eamon Keogh (0-1), Ronan McGoldrick (0-3), Mark Hughes (0-4), Larry Moran (0-4) | Report | Colm Farrell (0-1), Barry Gilleran (0-1), Daire O’Brien (0-1), Andrew Kelly (1-3), Robbie O’Connell (0-1), Darragh O’Connell (0-1) | Pearse Park; Attendance: 1500 Max (Covid-19); Referee: Aiden Dowler; Man of the Match: Mickey Quinn |

== Leinster Senior Club Football Championship ==
The 2020 Leinster Senior Club Football Championship was cancelled due to the impact of the COVID-19 pandemic on Gaelic games.
