= 2009 All-Ireland Junior Football Championship =

All Ireland Champions
- Winners: Cork (15th win)
- Captain: Chris O'Donovan
- Manager: Mossie Barrett

All Ireland Runners-up
- Runners-up: Roscommon
- Captain: Martin Reynolds
- Manager: Michael Jordan

Provincial Champions
- Munster: Cork
- Leinster: Louth
- Ulster: Not Played
- Connacht: Roscommon

The 2009 All-Ireland Junior Football Championship was the 79th staging of the competition since its establishment by the Gaelic Athletic Association in 1912.

Traditionally, the four provincial championship winners face each other at the All-Ireland semi-final stage.

As the Ulster GAA council did not hold a provincial championship, the fourth semi-final spot was therefore taken by London, as winners of the 2009 All-Britain Junior Football Championship.

The victory of Cork in the final against Roscommon on 22 August, was the county's 15th in the history of the All-Ireland Junior Football Championship.

== Results ==
=== Munster Junior Football Championship ===
7 June 2009 Semi-Final	Cork	3-10 - 0-09	Kerry	Fitzgerald Stadium, Killarney
	Lynch (2-3, 1f), M. Murphy (1-0), A. O'Sullivan (0-3), Hurley (0-2), J.P. Murphy (0-1f), Cahill (0-1)		O'Donoghue (0-3, 1f), Curtin (0-2), Garnett (0-1), Mahony (0-1), O'Callaghan (0-1), O'Driscoll (0-1)	Referee: M. Condon (Waterford)

GK	1	Paddy O'Shea (St Vincent's)
RCB	2	Pat Gayer (Castlemagner)
FB	3	Enda Wiseman (Castletownbere)
LCB	4	Michael Prout (Shamrocks)
RHB	5	Richard O'Sullivan (Kinsale)
CHB	6	Anthony Fenton (St Vincent's)
LHB	7	Michael Fehilly (Diarmuid Ó Mathúnas)
MF	8	Andrew O'Sullivan (Castletownbere)
MF	9	Chris O'Donovan (Valley Rovers) (c)
RHF	10	Daniel O'Donovan (Kilmacabea)
CHF	11	Cathrach Keane (Newcestown)
LHF	12	Colm O'Driscoll (Tadhg McCarthaigh's)
RCF	13	Vincent Hurley (Courcey Rovers)
FF	14	Fiachra Lynch (Valley Rovers)
LCF	15	John Paul Murphy (St Vincent's)
Substitutes:
	16	Paudie Cahill (Glenville) for Murphy
	17	Noel O'Riordan (Glenville) for Hurley
	18	Michael Murphy (Ballinora) for Keane
	19	Kevin O'Brien (Ballinacurra) for Daniel O'Donovan

GK	1	Seán Óg Ó Ciardubháin (Cordal)
RCB	2	Wayne O'Sullivan (Skellig Rangers) (c)
FB	3	Éamon Hickson (Annascaul)
LCB	4	Brian Maguire (Listowel Emmets)
RHB	5	Shane Enright (Tarbert)
CHB	6	Fergal Griffin (Glenbeigh-Glencar)
LHB	7	Jeremy King (Beale)
MF	8	Andrew Garnett (Spa)
MF	9	Alan O'Sullivan (Tuosist)
RHF	10	Paddy O'Connell (Tarbert)
CHF	11	Niall Mahony (Spa)
LHF	12	Gary O'Driscoll (Skellig Rangers)
RCF	13	David O'Callaghan (St Pat's, Blennerville)
FF	14	Mike O'Donoghue (Spa)
LCF	15	Patrick Curtin (Moyvane)
Substitutes:
	16	Daniel Doyle (Churchill) for Hickson
	17	Gary Sayers (Keel) for O'Connell
	18	Niall Fleming (Ballydesmond) for O'Callaghan

24 June 2009 Final	Cork	1-21 - 0-13	Clare	Páirc Uí Chaoimh, Cork
				Referee: K. O'Brien (Tipperary)

=== Leinster Junior Football Championship ===
28 June 2009 Final	Louth	1-08 - 0-11	Longford	Croke Park
				Referee: J. Curley (Meath)

8 July 2009 (Replay)	Louth	1-12 - 0-10	Longford	Pearse Park, Longford
	McGinn (0-6, 2f), Rogers (0-4, 1f), Rafferty (1-0, pen), Devaney (0-1), Conlon (0-1)		McKeon (0-6, 3f), Shanley (0-1), Flynn (0-1f), Gill (0-1), Glendenning (0-1)	Referee: D. Brazil (Offaly)

GK	1	Seán Connor (St Patrick's)
RCB	2	Tommy Costello (Newtown Blues)
FB	3	Colin Goss (St Patrick's) (c)
LCB	4	Kevin Moran (Glyde Rangers)
RHB	5	Shane Brennan (Seán O'Mahony's)
CHB	6	Gareth Moran (Glyde Rangers)
LHB	7	Peter Nixon (Dundalk Young Irelands)
MF	8	Richard Brennan (Cooley Kickhams)
MF	9	David Devaney (Glyde Rangers)
RHF	10	Conor Rafferty (Cooley Kickhams)
CHF	11	J.J. Quigley (Clan na Gael)
LHF	12	Cian Matthews (Oliver Plunketts)
RCF	13	Kevin Rogers (Naomh Malachi)
FF	14	Hugh McGinn (Newtown Blues)
LCF	15	Niall Conlon (O'Connells)
Substitutes:
	16	Declan Byrne (St Mochta's) for Brennan
	17	Dean Matthews (Glyde Rangers) for Quigley
	18	Wayne Reilly (St Mary's) for Rafferty
	19	Éamon Carroll (St Patrick's) for Rogers
	20	Nicky Mackin (Geraldines) for Kevin Moran

GK	1	Stephen Watters (Clonguish)
RCB	2	Francis Brady (Killoe Young Emmets)
FB	3	Mark Duffy (Fr. Manning Gaels)
LCB	4	Niall Vance (Dromard)
RHB	5	James McEntire (Abbeylara)
CHB	6	Francis Kavanagh (Colmcille)
LHB	7	Johnny Kane (Fr. Manning Gaels)
MF	8	Philip Reynolds (Shroid Slashers)
MF	9	Kevin Diffley (Ballymahon)
RHF	10	Pauric Gill (Fr. Manning Gaels)
CHF	11	Shane Cox (Legan Sarsfields)
LHF	12	Trevor Glendenning (Longford Slashers)
RCF	13	Paul McKeon (Colmcille)
FF	14	Pádraig Shanley (Rathcline)
LCF	15	Colm Flynn (Ballymahon) (c)
Substitutes:
	16	Gary Murtagh (Colmcille) for Vance
	17	Shane Doyle (Kenagh) for Cox
	18	Stephen Phillips (Longford Slashers) for Shanley
	19	Joe McCormack (Killoe Young Emmets) for Flynn
	20	Fergus Kelly (Granard St Mary's) for Reynolds

=== Connacht Junior Football Championship ===
31 May 2009 Final	Roscommon	2-09 - 0-10	Mayo	Páirc Seán Mac Diarmada, Carrick-on-Shannon
				Referee: F. Flynn (Leitrim)

=== All-Ireland Semi-Finals ===
8 August 2009	Cork	0-15 - 2-08	Louth	O'Moore Park, Portlaoise
	Murphy (0-5, 4F), D. O'Donovan (0-4f), Hurley (0-2), J. O'Sullivan (0-1), R. O'Sullivan (0-1), O'Driscoll (0-1), O'Mahony (0-1)		McGinn (0-3, 2f), Matthews (1-0), R. Brennan (1-0), Nixon (0-1), Byrne (0-1), Quigley (0-1), Conlon (0-1), Carroll (0-1)	Referee: M. Meade (Limerick)

GK	1	Paddy O'Shea (St Vincent's)
RCB	2	Pat Gayer (Castlemagner)
FB	3	Enda Wiseman (Castletownbere)
LCB	4	John McLoughlin (Kanturk)
RHB	5	Richard O'Sullivan (Kinsale)
CHB	6	Gerry Healy (Ballydesmond)
LHB	7	Chris O'Donovan (Valley Rovers) (c)
MF	8	Michael Fehilly (Diarmuid Ó Mathúnas)
MF	9	Andrew O'Sullivan (Castletownbere)
RHF	10	Daniel O'Donovan (Kilmacabea)
CHF	11	Jamie O'Sullivan (Bishopstown)
LHF	12	Colm O'Driscoll (Tadhg McCarthaigh's)
RCF	13	Vincent Hurley (Courcey Rovers)
FF	14	Robert O'Mahony (St Finbarr's)
LCF	15	John Paul Murphy (St Vincent's)
Substitutes:
	16	Colm O'Connell (Killavullen) for Fehilly
	17	Paudie Cahill (Glenville) for Hurley

GK	1	Seán Connor (St Patrick's)
RCB	2	Tommy Costello (Newtown Blues)
FB	3	Colin Goss (St Patrick's) (c)
LCB	4	Kevin Moran (Glyde Rangers)
RHB	5	Shane Brennan (Seán O'Mahony's)
CHB	6	Gareth Moran (Glyde Rangers)
LHB	7	Peter Nixon (Dundalk Young Irelands)
MF	8	Richard Brennan (Cooley Kickhams)
MF	9	David Devaney (Glyde Rangers)
RHF	10	Conor Rafferty (Cooley Kickhams)
CHF	11	J.J. Quigley (Clan na Gael)
LHF	12	Declan Byrne (St Mochta's)
RCF	13	Kevin Rogers (Naomh Malachi)
FF	14	Hugh McGinn (Newtown Blues)
LCF	15	Niall Conlon (O'Connells)
Substitutes:
	16	Éamon Carroll (St Patrick's) for Kevin Moran
	17	Dean Matthews (Glyde Rangers) for Rafferty
	18	Wayne Reilly (St Mary's) for Rogers

8 August 2009	Roscommon	0-14 - 0-05	London	Dr Hyde Park, Roscommon
	Garvey (0-4), R. Kelly (0-2), Keenehan (0-2) McCormack (0-2), McDermott (0-2, 1f), Guilford (0-1), Reynolds (0-1)		Hart (0-2f), Quinn (0-1), E. Gallagher (0-1), Murray (0-1)	Referee: S. McNamee (Tyrone)

GK	1	Mark Miley (St Dominic's)
RCB	2	Kevin Kilcline (Roscommon Gaels)
FB	3	Mark McLoughlin (St Aidan's)
LCB	4	Eamon Towey (St Croan's)
RHB	5	Niall Carty (Padraig Pearses)
CHB	6	Jonathan Harte (St Barry's)
LHB	7	Cathal Dineen (Castlerea St Kevin's)
MF	8	Paul Freeman (Éire Óg)
MF	9	Martin Reynolds (St Faithleach's) (c)
RHF	10	Clement McCormack (St Faithleach's)
CHF	11	Damien Keenehan (Boyle)
LHF	12	Martin Guilford (St Barry's)
RCF	13	Paul Garvey (Kilmore)
FF	14	Ronan Kelly (Creggs)
LCF	15	Darren McDermott (Éire Óg)
Substitutes:
	16	Dessie Carlos (Ballinameen) for McCormack
	17	Ultan Kelly (St Dominic's) for Guilford
	18	Eamon Bannon (Fuerty) for Harte
	19	Brian Mullin (St Croan's) for Ronan Kelly
	20	Colin Canny (Creggs) for Freeman

GK	1	J. McHugh
RCB	2	R. Walsh
FB	3	T. Gormley
LCB	4	B. Moriarty
RHB	5	M. Keane
CHB	6	P. McDermott
LHB	7	C. Donnelly
MF	8	D. Gallagher
MF	9	J. Power
RHF	10	C. Conneely
CHF	11	B. Quinn
LHF	12	J. Cott
RCF	13	J. Hart
FF	14	J.P. O'Donnell
LCF	15	J. O'Connor
Substitutes:
	16	D. Falvey for O'Donnell
	17	E. Gallagher for Hart
	18	C. Houlihan for Donnelly
	19	N. Murray for O'Connor
	20	R. McGowan for Conneely
	21	D. Cannon for Gormley

=== All-Ireland Final ===
22 August 2009	Cork	0-15 - 0-12	Roscommon	O'Moore Park, Portlaoise
	D. O'Donovan (0-6, 5f, 1'45), O'Mahony (0-4), O'Driscoll (0-2), A. O'Sullivan (0-1), Hurley (0-1), Murphy (0-1)	Report	McDermott (0-5, 2f), Garvey (0-3, 1f), Reynolds (0-1), Cox (0-1), Dineen (0-1), Keenehan (0-1)	Referee: T. Quigley (Dublin)

GK	1	Paddy O'Shea (St Vincent's)
RCB	2	Pat Gayer (Castlemagner)
FB	3	Enda Wiseman (Castletownbere)
LCB	4	John McLoughlin (Kanturk)
RHB	5	Richard O'Sullivan (Kinsale)
CHB	6	Gerry Healy (Ballydesmond)
LHB	7	Michael Fehilly (Diarmuid Ó Mathúnas)
MF	8	Andrew O'Sullivan (Castletownbere)
MF	9	Chris O'Donovan (Valley Rovers) (c)
RHF	10	Daniel O'Donovan (Kilmacabea)
CHF	11	Jamie O'Sullivan (Bishopstown)
LHF	12	Colm O'Driscoll (Tadhg McCarthaigh's)
RCF	13	Vincent Hurley (Courcey Rovers)
FF	14	Robert O'Mahony (St Finbarr's)
LCF	15	John Paul Murphy (St Vincent's)
Substitutes:
	16	Michael Prout (Shamrocks) for Fehilly
	17	Paudie Cahill (Glenville) for Hurley
	18	Noel O'Riordan (Glenville) for Andrew O'Sullivan

GK	1	Mark Miley (St Dominic's)
RCB	2	Kevin Kilcline (Roscommon Gaels)
FB	3	Mark McLoughlin (St Aidan's)
LCB	4	Eamon Towey (St Croan's)
RHB	5	Niall Carty (Padraig Pearses)
CHB	6	Dermot McGarry (Western Gaels)
LHB	7	Cathal Dineen (Castlerea St Kevin's)
MF	8	Paul Freeman (Éire Óg)
MF	9	Martin Reynolds (St Faithleach's) (c)
RHF	10	Clement McCormack (St Faithleach's)
CHF	11	Damien Keenehan (Boyle)
LHF	12	Ronan Cox (St Michael's)
RCF	13	Paul Garvey (Kilmore)
FF	14	Ronan Kelly (Creggs)
LCF	15	Darren McDermott (Éire Óg)
Substitutes:
	16	Stephen Ormsby (St Faithleach's) for McGarry
	17	Thomas Mahon (Western Gaels) for McCormack
	18	Brian Mullin (St Croan's) for Kelly
