= 2023 O'Byrne Cup =

Gaelic games competition in Ireland

Tournament details
- Province: Leinster
- Year: 2023
- Trophy: O'Byrne Cup
- Date: 4–21 January 2023
- Teams: 11
- Defending champions: Dublin

Winners
- Champions: Longford (4th win)
- Manager: Paddy Christie
- Captain: Barry O'Farrell

Runners-up
- Runners-up: Louth
- Manager: Mickey Harte
- Captain: Sam Mulroy

Other
- Matches played: 14

The 2023 O'Byrne Cup was a Gaelic football tournament played by eleven county teams of Leinster GAA in January 2023; Kilkenny did not take part. Dublin were the holders.

The tournament was won by Longford, with Dessie Reynolds scoring 3-3 in the final against Louth. The competition was marred by a series of cancelled games, as four teams gave walkovers in the later rounds, saying that they did not have enough players available, with the Sigerson Cup and other competitions going on. Leinster GAA stated that "the integrity of the competition has now been diminished. In future, counties will have to give serious consideration to their fixture schedule before committing to participating."

== Competition format ==
The eleven teams are drawn to play in two groups of four teams and one group of three teams.

Each team plays the other teams in their group once. Two points are awarded for a win and one for a draw.

The three group winners advance to the knockout stage, with one of the winners of a four-team group playing the winners of the three-team group in the semi-final, and the other four-team group winners advancing directly to the final.

== Group stage ==
Games took place 4–11 January 2023.

=== Group A ===
| Pos | Team | Pld | W | D | L | PF | PA | PD | Pts | Qualification |
|---|---|---|---|---|---|---|---|---|---|---|
| 1 | Louth (Note: Wexford received a walkover from Louth.) | 3 | 2 | 0 | 1 | 25 | 22 | +3 | 4 (Note: Louth are ranked ahead of Westmeath as they won the head-to-head game between the teams) | Advance to semi-final |
| 2 | Westmeath (Note: Westmeath received a walkover from Kildare.) | 3 | 2 | 0 | 1 | 28 | 17 | +11 | 4 | |
| 3 | Kildare | 3 | 1 | 0 | 2 | 34 | 25 | +9 | 2 (Note: Kildare are ranked ahead of Wexford as they won the head-to-head game between the teams) | |
| 4 | Wexford | 3 | 1 | 0 | 2 | 17 | 40 | −23 | 2 | |

Updated to match(es) played on 7 January 2023. Source: Leinster GAA

=== Group B ===
| Pos | Team | Pld | W | D | L | PF | PA | PD | Pts | Qualification |
|---|---|---|---|---|---|---|---|---|---|---|
| 1 | Longford | 3 | 2 | 1 | 0 | 52 | 27 | +25 | 5 | Advance to final |
| 2 | Meath | 3 | 1 | 2 | 0 | 42 | 38 | +4 | 4 | |
| 3 | Carlow (Note: Carlow received a walkover from Laois.) | 3 | 1 | 0 | 2 | 16 | 31 | −15 | 2 | |
| 4 | Laois | 3 | 0 | 1 | 2 | 29 | 43 | −14 | 1 | |

Updated to match(es) played on 11 January 2023. Source: Leinster GAA

=== Group C ===
| Pos | Team | Pld | W | D | L | PF | PA | PD | Pts | Qualification |
|---|---|---|---|---|---|---|---|---|---|---|
| 1 | Offaly | 2 | 2 | 0 | 0 | 23 | 15 | +8 | 4 | Advance to semi-final |
| 2 | Dublin | 2 | 1 | 0 | 1 | 29 | 20 | +9 | 2 | |
| 3 | Wicklow | 2 | 0 | 0 | 2 | 16 | 33 | −17 | 0 | |

Updated to match(es) played on 11 January 2023. Source: Leinster GAA

== Knockout stage ==
15 January 2023
14:00 IWT (UTC±0)
Semi-Final

Report

| Louth | w/o – scr. | Offaly |

Páirc Naomh Bríd, Dundalk

TG4

21 January 2023
14:00 IWT (UTC±0)
Final

Report

| Longford | 3-13 (22) – (12) 0-12 | Louth |
|---|---|---|
(HT: 1-07 – 0-07)

Pearse Park, Longford
Referee: Keith O'Brien (Westmeath)

| GK | 1 | Paddy Collum (Fr. Manning Gaels) |
| RCB | 2 | Barry O'Farrell (Carrickedmond) |
| FB | 3 | Andrew Farrell (Cashel) |
| LCB | 4 | Ryan Moffett (Killoe Young Emmets) |
| RHB | 5 | Peter Lynn (Longford Slashers) |
| CHB | 6 | Gary Rogers (Mullinalaghta) |
| LHB | 7 | Iarla O'Sullivan (Rathcline) |
| MF | 8 | Fergal Sheridan (Colmcille) |
| MF | 9 | Darren Gallagher (Granard St Mary's) |
| RHF | 10 | Dylan Farrell (Killashee St. Brigid's) |
| CHF | 11 | Joseph Hagan (Dromard) |
| LHF | 12 | Michael Quinn (Killoe Young Emmets) |
| RCF | 13 | Dessie Reynolds (Seán Connolly's) |
| FF | 14 | Daniel Mimnagh (Killoe Young Emmets) |
| LCF | 15 | David McGivney (Mullinalaghta) |
Substitutes:
| | 16 | Aaron Farrell (Dromard) for D. Farrell |
| | 17 | Robbie Smyth (Abbeylara) for Quinn |
| | 18 | James McGivney (Mullinalaghta) for Mimnagh |
| | 19 | Jack Macken (Colmcille) for Reynolds |
| | 20 | Peter Foy (St Loman's, Westmeath) for O'Sullivan |
| | 21 | Brian Masterson (Abbeylara) for Lynn |
| | 22 | Ruairí Harkin (Colmcille) for Rogers |
| | 23 | Tadhg McNevin (Longford Slashers) for Gallagher |
| | 24 | Conor Keenan (Fr. Manning Gaels) for Hagan |
| | 25 | Jayson Matthews (Mullinalaghta) for D. McGivney |

| GK | 1 | Martin McEneaney (St Patrick's) |
| RCB | 2 | Alan Connor (Newtown Blues) |
| FB | 3 | Bevan Duffy (St Fechin's) |
| LCB | 4 | Páraic McKenny (St Mary's) |
| RHB | 5 | Oisín McGuinness (St Joseph's) |
| CHB | 6 | Liam Jackson (St Mary's) |
| LHB | 7 | Craig Lennon (St Mochta's) |
| MF | 8 | Tommy Durnin (Inniskeen Grattans, Monaghan) |
| MF | 9 | Conall McCaul (St Joseph's) |
| RHF | 10 | Shane Matthews (St Mary's) |
| CHF | 11 | Ciarán Keenan (St Mary's) |
| LHF | 12 | Ryan Burns (Hunterstown Rovers) |
| RCF | 13 | Jay Hughes (Dreadnots) |
| FF | 14 | Sam Mulroy (Naomh Máirtín) |
| LCF | 15 | Tom Gray (Naomh Máirtín) |
Substitutes:
| | 16 | Niall Sharkey (Glyde Rangers) for Lennon |
| | 17 | Gerard Browne (Roche Emmets) for McKenny |
| | 18 | Jack Murphy (St Patrick's) for Matthews |
| | 19 | Conor Clarke (Dreadnots) for Connor |
| | 20 | Evan Maher (St Kevin's) for McCaul |
