= 2015 Longford Senior Football Championship =

Longford S.F.C.
- Season: 2015
- Champions: Killoe (11th title)
- Relegated: None
- Winning Captain: Michael Quinn
- Man of the Match: Conor Berry (Abbeylara)
- Matches: 27

The 2015 Longford Senior Football Championship is the 99th running of the Longford GAA's premier club Gaelic football tournament for senior graded teams in County Longford, Ireland since the first County Championship was held in 1890 (98 completed since 1890, 1 started but not completed in 1891). The 2015 tournament consisted of 12 teams, with the winner going on to represent Longford in the Leinster Senior Club Football Championship. The championship starts with a league stage and then progresses to a knock out stage.

Killoe Young Emmets were the defending champions after they defeated Mullinalaghta St Columba's in the previous years final, and they successfully defended their title, defeating Abbeylara 1-14 to 1-11 on 4 October 2015 in Pearse Park.

This was Carrickedmond's return to the senior grade in 3 years since relegation in 2011 after claiming the 2014 Longford Intermediate Football Championship title, however they were due to make the drop straight back down to the Intermediate grade after losing a Relegation Playoff final before the format for the 2016 S.F.C. was changed.

== Team changes ==
The following teams have changed division since the 2014 championship season.

=== To S.F.C. ===
Promoted from I.F.C.

- Carrickedmond – (Intermediate Champions)

=== From S.F.C. ===
Relegated to I.F.C.

- Ardagh St Patrick's

== Group stage ==
All 12 teams enter the competition at this stage. The top 8 teams go into a random unseeded draw for the quarter-finals while the bottom 4 teams will enter a Relegation Playoff. If teams are level on points and a place in the quarter-final is at stake, a Playoff will be conducted to determine who goes through.

Pos	Team	Pld	W	L	D	Pts
1	Colmcille	3	3	0	0	6
2	Dromard	3	3	0	0	6
3	Mullinalaghta St Columba's	3	2	0	1	4
4	Clonguish	3	2	1	0	4
5	Abbeylara	3	1	0	2	2
6	Longford Slashers	3	1	1	1	3
7	St Mary's Granard	3	1	1	1	3
8	Killoe Young Emmets	3	1	2	0	2
9	Ballymahon	3	1	2	0	2
10	Mostrim	3	0	2	1	1
11	Carrickedmond	3	0	3	0	0
12	Father Manning Gaels	3	0	3	0	0

Round 1

- Killoe Young Emmets 1-15, 0-6 Mostrim, 17/7/2015,
- Dromard 0-15, 1-6 Carrickedmond, 18/7/2015,
- Colmcille 0-9, 0-7 Fr. Manning Gaels, 18/7/2015,
- St Mary's Granard 4-9, 1-14 Clonguish, 19/7/2015,
- Abbeylara 3-12, 1-11 Ballymahon, 19/7/2015,
- St Columba's 0-14, 1-4 Longford Slashers, 19/7/2015,

Round 2

- Abbeylara 0-12, 2-6 St Mary's Granard, 24/7/2015,
- Clonguish 2-15, 0-6 Mostrim, 25/7/2015,
- Colmcille 1-14, 0-7 Fr. Manning Gaels, 25/7/2015,
- Longford Slashers 2-8, 0-11 Killoe Young Emmets, 26/7/2015,
- Dromard 3-15, 1-8 Ballymahon, 26/7/2015,
- St Columba's 0-10, 0-8 Carrickedmond, 26/7/2015,

Round 3

- Ballymahon 3-13, 2-7 Fr. Manning Gaels, 7/8/2015,
- Abbeylara 0-9, 0-9 St Columba's, 8/8/2015,
- Longford Slashers 0-9, 1-6 Mostrim, 8/8/2015,
- Colmcille 1-14, 0-7 St Mary's Granard, 8/8/2015,
- Dromard 1-9, 0-11 Killoe Young Emmets, 9/8/2015,
- Clonguish 0-12, 0-4 Carrickedmond, 9/8/2015,

Quarter-Final Playoff

- Killoe Young Emmets 4-16, 2-9 Ballymahon, Keenan Park, 16/8/2015,

== Knockout stage ==
The top 8 teams from the league stages qualify for a random unseeded draw for the quarter-finals.

Quarter-Finals		Semi-Finals		Final
Colmcille	0-9
Clonguish	1-16	Clonguish	0-10
Abbeylara	0-16	Abbeylara	1-10
St Mary's Granard	0-10			Abbeylara	1-11
Mullinalaghta St Columba's	2-7			Killoe Young Emmets	1-14
Killoe Young Emmets	2-10	Killoe Young Emmets	2-11
Dromard	0-13	Dromard	0-10
Longford Slashers	0-12

Quarter-Finals:

- Dromard 3-7, 1-13 Longford Slashers, Pearse Park, 22/8/2015,
- Killoe Young Emmets 2-10, 2-7 Mullinalaghta St Columba's, Pearse Park, 23/8/2015,
- Clonguish 1-16, 0-9 Colmcille, Pearse Park, 29/8/2015,
- Abbeylara 0-16, 0-10 St Mary's Granard, Pearse Park, 30/8/2015,
- Dromard 0-13, 0-12 Longford Slashers, Emmet Park, 30/8/2015, (Replay)

Semi-Finals:

- Killoe Young Emmets 2-11, 0-10 Dromard, Pearse Park, 6/9/2015,
- Abbeylara 1-10, 0-10 Clonguish, Pearse Park, 12/9/2015,

== Final ==
4 October 2015
4pm
Final

Killoe Young Emmets	1-14 : 1-11	Abbeylara
Michael Quinn (0-2), Paddy Thompson (0-1), Denis McGoldrick (0-4, 3 frees), Daniel Mimnagh (1-0), Larry Moran (0-1), Sean McCormack (0-4, 3 frees), Mark Hughes (0-2)	Report	Conor Berry (0-3); Kieran Mulvihill (0-1), Jason Kelly (0-2, 1 free); William Crawford (0-1), Robbie Smyth (0-3, 2 frees)

Pearse Park
Referee: Derek Fahy, Ballymahon

== Relegation Play Off ==
Relegation Semi-Finals:

- Fr. Manning Gaels 2-6, 0-10 Ballymahon, Pearse Park, 22/8/2015,
- Mostrim 1-11, 1-6 Carrickedmond, Pearse Park, 23/8/2015,

Relegation Final:

- Ballymahon 2-10, 2-9 Carrickedmond, Devine Park, 29/8/2015,
