= 2016 Longford Senior Football Championship =

Longford S.F.C.
- Season: 2016
- Champions: Mullinalaghta (3rd title)
- Relegated: Rathcline
- Winning Captain: Shane Mulligan
- Man of the Match: John Keegan
- Matches: 29

The 2016 Longford Senior Football Championship is the 100th running of the Longford GAA's premier club Gaelic football tournament for senior graded teams in County Longford, Ireland since the first County Championship was held in 1890 (99 completed since 1890, 1 started but not completed in 1891). The 2016 tournament consisted of 12 teams, with the winner going on to represent Longford in the Leinster Senior Club Football Championship. The championship starts with a group stage and then progresses to a knock out stage.

Killoe Young Emmets were the defending champions after they defeated Abbeylara in the previous years final.

This was Rathcline's return to the senior grade after 4 years since relegation in 2011 after claiming the 2015 Longford Intermediate Football Championship title, however they were relegated at the end of the season. Carrickedmond lost the 2015 relegation final, but with the new format for this year's competition they were permitted to stay in the senior grade.

In the final, played on 16 October, Mullinalaghta St Columba's defeated Abbeylara by 1-8 to 0-8 to claim their third ever Longford Senior Football title and their first since 1950.

== Team changes ==
The following teams have changed division since the 2015 championship season.

=== To S.F.C. ===
Promoted from I.F.C.

- Rathcline – (Intermediate Champions)

=== From S.F.C. ===
Relegated to I.F.C.

- None

== Group stage ==
All 12 teams enter the competition at this stage. Group A and B consist of 4 teams with 3 progressing to the quarter-finals. Group C consist of the 4 teams involved in the 2015 S.F.C. Relegation Playoffs as well as the 2015 I.F.C. Champions. 2 teams from Group C proceed to the quarter-finals while the bottom finisher will be relegated to the 2017 I.F.C.

=== Group A ===
Team	Pld	W	L	D	PF	PA	PD	Pts
Longford Slashers	3	3	0	0	41	33	+8	6
Clonguish	3	2	1	0	52	50	+2	4
Killoe Young Emmet's	3	1	2	0	43	46	-3	2
St Mary's Granard	3	0	3	0	36	43	-7	0

Round 1:

- Clonguish 0-21, 1-14 Killoe Young Emmets, 31/7/2016,
- Longford Slashers 0-11, 0-8 St Mary's Granard, 31/7/2016,

Round 2:

- Clonguish 1-15, 1-13 St Mary's Granard, 5/8/2016,
- Longford Slashers 1-10, 0-12 Killoe Young Emmets, 21/8/2016, (Note*)

Round 3:

- Longford Slashers 1-14, 0-13 Clonguish, 28/8/2016,
- Killoe Young Emmets 2-8, 0-12 St Mary's Granard, 28/8/2016,

- (Note*) On 7 August 2016, Killoe Young Emmets beat Longford Slashers 1-9 to 2-5 however the Longford CCCC ordered a replay to be called after Killoe were found to have 16 players on the pitch when they scored what they thought was the winning point late on in the game. The game had been re-fixed for 16 August 2016, but Slashers appeal over the suspensions of two of their players to the Leinster GAA Hearings Committee and their decision has led to the Longford CCCC agreeing to defer the replay until 21 August 2016.

=== Group B ===
Team	Pld	W	L	D	PF	PA	PD	Pts
Abbeylara	3	2	0	1	38	31	+7	5
Mullinalaghta St Columba's	3	1	0	2	32	28	+4	4
Dromard	3	1	1	1	47	44	+3	3
Colmcille	3	0	3	0	26	40	-14	0

Round 1:

- Dromard 4-8, 0-12 Colmcille, 30/7/2016,
- Abbeylara 0-9, 0-9 Mullinalaghta St Columba's, 31/7/2016,

Round 2:

- Mullinalaghta St Columba's 0-14, 1-11 Dromard, 6/8/2016,
- Abbeylara 0-11, 1-6 Colmcille, 6/8/2016,

Round 3:

- Abbeylara 1-15, 1-10 Dromard, 14/8/2016,
- Mullinalaghta St Columba's 0-9, 0-5 Colmcile, 14/8/2016,

=== Group C ===
Team	Pld	W	L	D	PF	PA	PD	Pts
Mostrim	4	3	0	1	78	46	+32	7
Carrickedmond	4	3	1	0	63	38	+25	6
Ballymahon	4	2	1	1	52	55	-3	5
Fr. Manning Gaels	4	1	3	0	50	72	-22	2
Rathcline	4	0	4	0	59	91	-32	0

Round 1:

- Ballymahon 2-11, 1-10 Fr. Manning Gaels, 24/7/2016,
- Carrickedmond 2-16, 0-5 Rathcline, 24/7/2016,
- Mostrim – Bye,

Round 2:

- Mostrim 0-15, 1-9 Carrickedmond, 29/7/2016,
- Ballymahon 2-16, 3-12 Rathcline, 29/7/2016,
- Fr. Manning Gaels – Bye,

Round 3:

- Fr. Manning Gaels 1-13, 1-12 Rathcline, 2/8/2016,
- Mostrim 0-10, 1-7 Ballymahon, 3/8/2016,
- Carrickedmond – Bye,

Round 4:

- Mostrim 2-16, 1-3 Fr. Manning Gaels, 7/8/2016,
- Carrickedmond 1-8, 0-3 Ballymahon, 7/8/2016,
- Rathcline – Bye,

Round 5:

- Mostrim 3-22, 2-12 Rathcline, 14/8/2016,
- Carrickedmond 1-15, 0-15 Fr. Manning Gaels, 14/8/2016,
- Ballymahon – Bye,

== Knockout stage ==
The top 8 teams from the league stages qualify for the quarter-finals.

Quarter-Finals		Semi-Finals		Final
Longford Slashers	1-9
Killoe Young Emmets	0-15	Killoe Young Emmets	1-10
Mullinalaghta St Columba's	1-19	Mullinalaghta St Columba's	2-12
Mostrim	2-5			Mullinalaghta St Columba's	1-8
Dromard	0-17			Abbeylara	0-8
Carrickedmond	1-5	Dromard	0-5
Clonguish	0-8	Abbeylara	0-8
Abbeylara	0-10

Quarter-Finals:

- Mullinalaghta St Columba's 1-19, 2-5 Mostrim, 3/9/2016,
- Killoe Young Emmets 0-15, 1-9 Longford Slashers, 4/9/2016,
- Dromard 0-17, 1-5 Carrickedmond, 11/9/2016,
- Abbeylara 0-10, 0-8 Clonguish, 11/9/2016,

Semi-Finals:

- Mullinalaghta St Columba's 2-12, 1-10 Killoe Young Emmets, 17/9/2016,
- Abbeylara 0-8, 0-5 Dromard, 23/9/2016,

== Final ==
16/10/2016
4pm
Final

Mullinalaghta St Columba's	1-8 - 0-8	Abbeylara
	Report

Pearse Park, Longford
Referee: Patrick Maguire
