= 2000 in Ireland =

- Centuries: 18th; 19th; 20th; 21st
- Decades: 1980s; 1990s; 2000s; 2010s; 2020s
- See also: 2000 in Northern Ireland; Other events of 2000; List of years in Ireland

The following lists events that happened during the year 2000 in Ireland.

== Incumbents ==
- President: Mary McAleese
- Taoiseach: Bertie Ahern (FF)
- Tánaiste: Mary Harney (PD)
- Minister for Finance: Charlie McCreevy (FF)
- Chief Justice:
  - Liam Hamilton (until 1 June 2000)
  - Ronan Keane (from 1 June 2000)
- Dáil: 28th
- Seanad: 21st

== Events ==
=== Januaru ===
- 4 January – The National Car Test (NCT) was introduced in accordance with EU Directive 2014/45/EU that makes car testing compulsory in all member states.

=== February ===
- 3 February – The gangster John Gilligan was extradited from the UK to Ireland on drug trafficking and murder charges.
- 7 February – The Chester Beatty Library opened in its new premises on the grounds of Dublin Castle, having been previously located at 20 Shrewsbury Road, Dublin 4 since 1953.
- 11 February – The British government suspended devolution in Northern Ireland.

=== April ===
- 10 April
  - The Dublin Area Rapid Transit rail system was extended southwards from Bray to Greystones and northwards from Howth Junction to Malahide.
  - The ambulance service regulator, the Pre-Hospital Emergency Care Council, was established.
- Spring – The American Clive Cussler's National Underwater and Marine Agency discovered the wreck of RMS Carpathia (sunk in 1918) 190 kilometres west of Fastnet Rock.
- 20 April – A 27-year-old Irish man with psychiatric illnesses was shot dead by the Garda Emergency Response Unit after a twenty-five-hour siege at his home in Toneymore, Abbeylara, County Longford.

=== May ===
- 5 May – The People in Need Trust held its seventh event.
- 6 May – The Provisional Irish Republican Army began decommissioning its weapons.
- 30 May – Devolution returned to Northern Ireland.

=== July ===
- 6 July – The Intoxicating Liquor Act, 2000 came into effect abolishing the so-called "holy hour" between 2 pm and 4 pm on Sundays when pubs had been forced to close their doors.

=== December ===
- 2 December – The Guinness Storehouse opened in Dublin
- 12 December – President Bill Clinton of the United States arrived in Dublin beginning his last international trip as President. He met President Mary McAleese, Taoiseach Bertie Ahern, and gave a speech in Dundalk.
- 13 December – Bill Clinton met the political leaders of Northern Ireland.

== Arts and literature ==
- 7 February – The Chester Beatty Library opened in its new premises in the grounds of Dublin Castle.
- 21 April – Release of film Nora.
- 31 October – Boyband Westlife scored their seventh straight UK number one, becoming the only artists in UK chart history to achieve this.
- December – The quarterly cultural magazine The Dublin Review was launched by Brendan Barrington.
- John Banville's novel Eclipse was published.
- Anne Enright's novel What Are You Like? was published.

== Sport ==
=== Association football ===
Shelbourne won the double of the League of Ireland Premier Division and the FAI Cup for the first time in their history. They then knocked out Macedonian side Sloga Jugomagnat in the first round of the 2000–01 UEFA Champions League qualifiers. Their 1–0 win in Skopje was the first away win in a European tie by a League of Ireland side for eighteen years. Rosenborg of Norway knock Shelbourne out 4–2 on aggregate in the second qualifying round.

=== Gaelic games ===
- Kilkenny won the All-Ireland Senior Hurling Championship.
- Kerry won the All-Ireland Senior Football Championship.

=== Golf ===
- Murphy's Irish Open was won by Patrik Sjöland (Sweden).

== Births ==
- 14 January – Jonathan Afolabi, footballer
- 26 January – Heather Payne, footballer
- 28 January – Aaron Connolly, footballer
- 1 February – Gavin Kilkenny, footballer
- 21 February – Michael O'Sullivan, jockey (d. 2025)
- 25 March – Conor Coventry, English-born footballer
- 4 May – Ciaran Booth, English-born rugby union player
- 6 July – Michael Obafemi, footballer
- 28 July – Lee O'Connor, footballer
- 7 August – Jordanne Jones, actress
- 7 August – Jaze Kabia, footballer
- 24 September – Neil Rock, cricketer
- 16 October – David Rawle, actor
- 2 November – Demi Isaac Oviawe, Nigerian-born actress

== Deaths ==
=== January to June ===
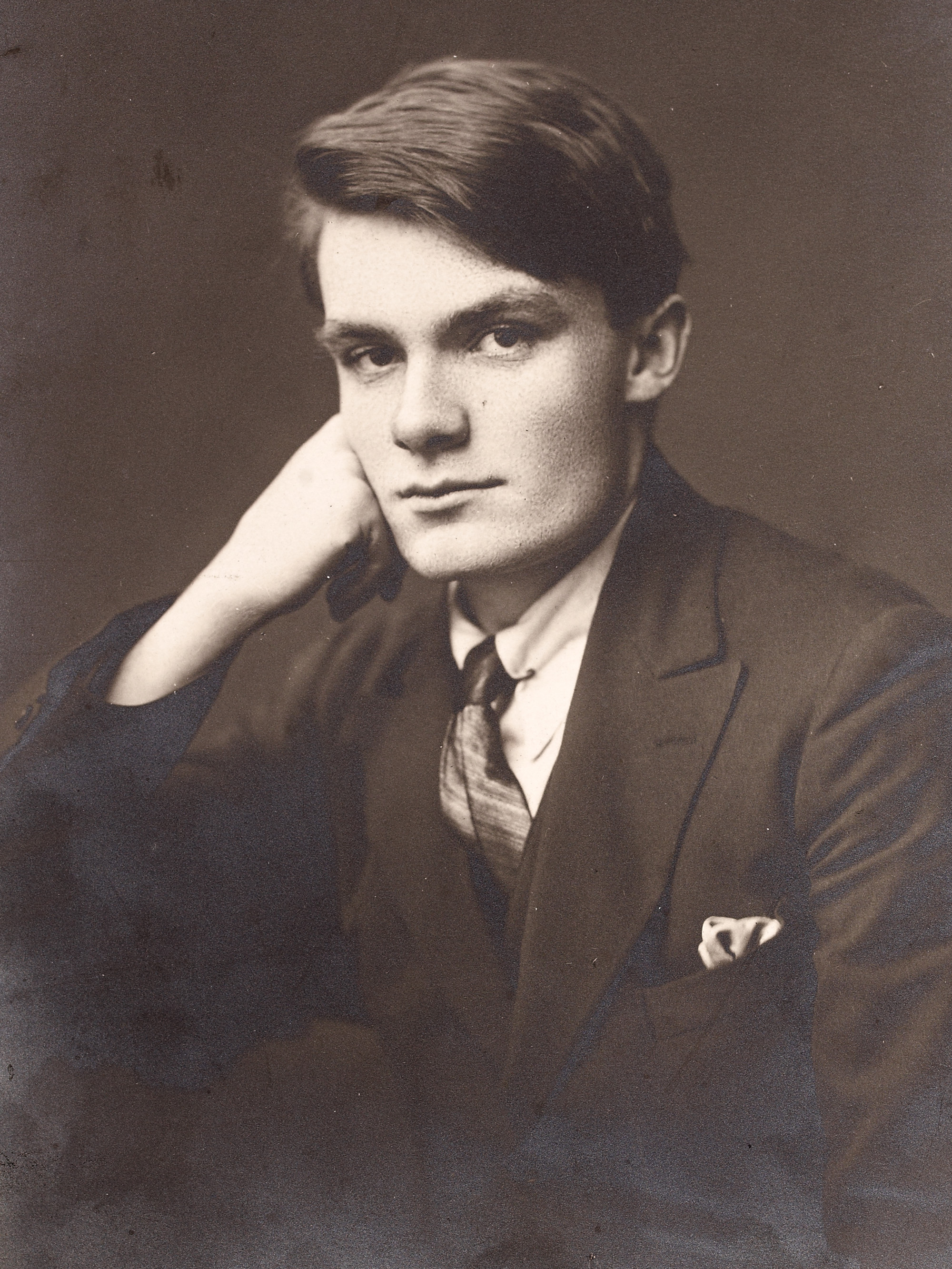
Francis Stuart

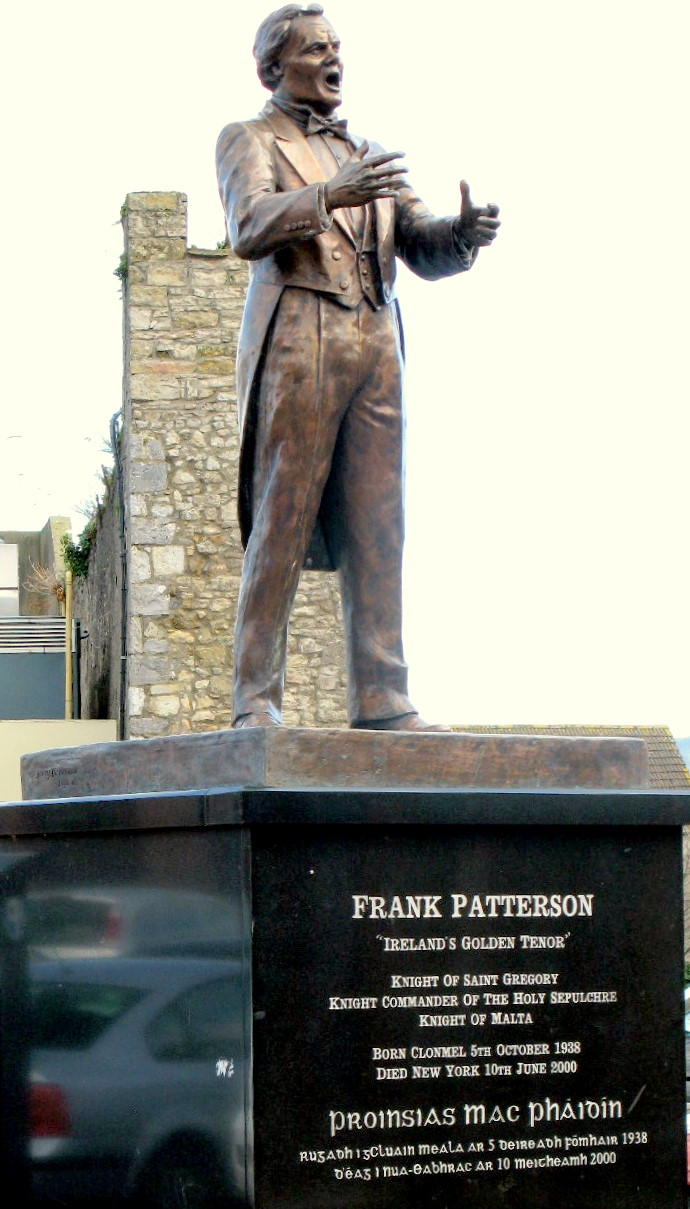
Frank Patterson (statue)

- 15 January – Alf Ringstead, footballer (b. 1927)
- 28 January – Tony Doyle, actor (b. 1942)
- 1 February – Patrick Shanahan, Fianna Fáil TD (b. 1908)
- 2 February – Francis Stuart, writer (b. 1902)
- 13 February – F. X. Martin, priest and historian (b. 1922)
- 25 February – Tom McEllistrim, Fianna Fáil TD (b. 1926)
- 6 March – Jonathan Philbin Bowman, journalist and radio presenter (b. 1969)
- 20 April – John Carthy, shot dead by the Garda Síochána (b. 1972)
- 7 June – Mona Tyndall, missionary sister and development worker (b. 1921)
- 10 June – Frank Patterson, tenor (b. 1938)

=== July to December ===
- 10 July – Denis O'Conor Don, hereditary chief of the O'Conor Don sept (b. 1912)
- 14 August – John Boland, senior Fine Gael politician (b. 1944)
- 18 October – James Gill, cricketer (b. 1911)
- 8 November – Brian Boydell, composer, professor of music at Trinity College Dublin (b. 1917)
- 18 November – Lochlainn O'Raifeartaigh, physicist (b. 1933)
- 21 November – Paddy Flanagan, cyclist (b. 1941)
- 26 November – Paddy Donegan, former Fine Gael TD and Cabinet Minister (b. 1923)
- 15 December – Paddy Barry, Cork hurler (b. 1928)

== See also ==
- 2000 in Irish television
