= R396 road =

R396 road may refer to:

- R396 road (Ireland)
- R396 road (South Africa)
