= Death of John Carthy =

2000 police shooting in Ireland

John Carthy (9 October 1972 – 20 April 2000) was a 27-year-old Irish citizen with known psychiatric illnesses who was shot dead by the Garda Emergency Response Unit in controversial circumstances on 20 April 2000, after a twenty-five-hour siege at his home in Toneymore, Abbeylara, County Longford.

== Background ==
John Carthy, born 9 October 1972, was the only son of John and Rose Carthy. He had one sister, Marie, who was two years his junior. He was an avid handballer and a member of Abbeylara Handball Club. His father, with whom he was very close, died on 12 April 1990. In 1992 John was diagnosed with clinical depression, and subsequently with bipolar affective disorder. John's general employment was in the construction industry. He resided with his mother in an old three-bedroom house in Toneymore, Abbeylara. She and John were due to move from this old house to a new home that had been built on their land by the Longford County Council as part of a rural housing scheme, and the old house was due to be demolished. On 19 April 2000, the day prior to his death, John stayed in the family home all day with his mother. His mother's testimony to the Barr Tribunal indicated that John was very hostile to the move, and that this was the primary topic of their discussions that day.

Like many people in the countryside, John Carthy was the licensed owner of a double-barreled shotgun, in his case a Russian-made IZh-43. His licence had been of limited duration prior to November 1998, when it was changed to an unlimited type, and was subsequently renewed on 29 August 1999.

== Siege ==
=== Day one: 19 April 2000 ===
At approximately 3:40pm on Wednesday 19 April 2000 John Carthy went to the cabinet that held his shotgun. He brought it, a full box of cartridges and his gun belt back to the kitchen demonstrating, according to his mother, that "no one was going to put him out of his house". He loaded the gun with two cartridges, went outside the hall door, and discharged two shots.

It is not clear whether John then forced his mother out of the family home, or whether she left at her own volition. However, Rose Carthy left the family home and travelled to her sister's house, two doors away. Mrs Carthy informed the Barr Tribunal that her son did not order her out of the home, despite rumours to the contrary at the time. She was, however, very afraid for her son. Rose Carthy asked her sister, Nancy Walsh, to ring the Gardaí in Granard, three kilometres away, to come out and "take the gun from John".

At 5:20pm Ann Walsh, John's first cousin, telephoned the Gardaí in Granard. Two Gardaí, John Gibbons and Colin White, were dispatched to the scene. It appears that Garda Gibbons knew John Carthy, as before he left Granard Garda station he took with him an official issue .38 Smith & Wesson revolver and some ammunition. He also obtained a Garda flak jacket and put on a "civilian jacket" over the flak jacket. Garda White was unarmed, in uniform and was the driver of a marked Garda car.

At approximately 5:55pm on Wednesday 19 April 2000 the two Gardaí drove into the driveway of the Carthy home. Two shots were fired in rapid succession from an unknown place and in an unknown direction. They quickly reversed their car and observed the Carthy home from a safer distance. At this stage John Carthy's general practitioner, Dr. Patrick Cullen, was called to the scene. While waiting for Gardaí he said that approximately ten shots were fired "out the back of the house". Dr. Cullen was followed to the house by an armed detective, Garda James Campbell, in an unmarked Garda car. He warned the three Gardaí now present that John Carthy might be aggressive due to the "previous incident and alleged Garda assault". He also advised them that John Carthy may have consumed alcohol.

Nonetheless, Detective Garda Campbell and Garda Gibbons, both of whom were armed, decided to approach John Carthy's home. The Barr Tribunal remarked about this decision that "It may be of significance that the house was now being approached by two armed Gardaí in circumstances where there was information to the effect that John Carthy had been on anti-depressant tablets, was not holding any hostage, had discharged his weapon on a number of occasions, and that he might be aggressive to them because they were Gardaí".

Detective Garda Campbell attempted to talk with John Carthy but, in his evidence, said Carthy replied with an expletive and a threat to blow his head off. This exchange was followed by a shot at the Garda car, which was unoccupied. In total, John Carthy fired six shots by the time Detective Garda Campbell rang Granard Garda station with a request that they contact Superintendent Michael Byrne, who was in charge of the Granard Sub-District. Byrne instructed them to contact Superintendent Joseph Shelly in Mullingar. Shelly assumed command of the incident and ordered that a party of armed Gardaí be sent from Athlone station forthwith. En route to Granard Garda Station, Superintendent Shelly had another discussion with Superintendent Byrne and requested that armed Gardaí from Longford also be sent to Abbeylara. By 5:30pm, therefore, armed Gardaí and detectives from Athlone, Longford and Mullingar had been sent to John Carthy's home in Abbeylara.

At 6:45pm the divisional commander for Longford/Westmeath, Chief Superintendent Patrick Tansey, became aware of events. He contacted Superintendent Shelly by phone. These conversations led to the decision to deploy the elite Emergency Response Unit (ERU). Assistant Commissioner Tony Hickey issued the request for their deployment. Six members of the ERU were subsequently sent to Abbeylara from the Special Detective section in Harcourt Street, Dublin, where they were based. Five ERU members were required to deal with practical matters while the sixth, Detective Sergeant Michael Jackson, was a trained negotiator. The ERU arrived at 9:50pm. Among their weapons were Uzi submachine guns, a Heckler & Koch assault rifle, a Benelli combat shotgun and SIG Sauer semi-automatic pistols.

While tactical control rests with ERU members on the scene, overall control rests with the divisional commander. During the Abbeylara siege, this was shared between Superintendent Shelly and Superintendent Byrne. The former was in command between 7:00am on 19 April and midnight. From midnight to 9:00am on 20 April, Superintendent Byrne was the Scene Commander and at 9:00am on the day of John Carthy's death, Superintendent Shelly resumed command.

=== Day two: 20 April 2000 ===
Superintendent Shelly officially took over at 9 am, but had been back on the scene at 8:20 am. Throughout the morning, numerous tactics were employed by the Gardaí to end the siege. John's cousin and close friend, Thomas Walsh, was brought in to talk with him.

John Carthy made somewhat confusing and poorly worded demands for cigarettes and a solicitor. The Garda negotiator saw this as a way of opening a dialogue so he told Carthy all they needed to do was ensure a safe method of delivery. In this Sergeant Jackson was technically breaking the negotiators' rule of 'no concession without one in exchange' but felt it worth it as it might calm Carthy and build some trust. He repeatedly told John that someone could approach to leave them nearby if he put the gun on the table (beside which he was looking out the window towards the negotiation post as he was talking to Jackson) if he placed the rifle on the table and kept his hands in view. John replied with various rebuffs including "don't bother, don't bother". As to the solicitor Carthy was told they could not send one in while he still had the gun. However, Gardaí could get one on the phone to advise Carthy, if he could tell them which solicitor to get in touch with. Jackson feared that having someone encroach on the home while Carthy was resting, to drop cigarettes covertly, might cause Carthy irritation at the invasion of his security. Carthy was quite vague on the identity of the solicitor and the scene commander thought it a waste of time to get one from the locality. At 12:24 pm, John Carthy telephoned a friend, Kevin Ireland, and informed him he had no notion of hurting anyone, that he was simply keeping them at bay with the gun and that he wanted a solicitor, one by the name of "Mick Finucane". Carthy was confused about the identity of the solicitor he wanted. Carthy may have been alluding to Michael Finucane, the Belfast solicitor and son of the assassinated Pat Finucane.

At approximately 5:55 pm on day two of the siege, Carthy exited the house. There were yells of "Armed Gardaí – drop your gun" and various words to that effect. Jackson asked Carthy in a more direct and pleading tone, noted in its distinct nature by witnesses, to drop the weapon. Jackson reluctantly drew his SIG Sauer pistol and attempted to bring Carthy down without killing him, with two shots to his legs. These shots did not bring Carthy down and he appeared not to notice them. In these crucial seconds, which the Tribunal found to be around a minute's duration, the ERU team hesitated in opening fire, continuing to plead with Carthy to surrender. The hesitation was so complete that local armed officers in the outer perimeter began to think the ERU team would not fire and one remarked "we're gonna have to do it ourselves" and were within a second of opening fire when Garda McCabe took action. Garda McCabe fired his Uzi at Carthy once, then again, both striking Carthy in the torso. Following the fourth shot, Carthy collapsed onto his side.

The ERU team moved in to disarm him and turning him onto his back saw he was critically injured. Medical help was summoned and they began immediate CPR. Despite various attempts to revive him, Carthy died quickly.

== Calls for an inquiry ==
On 25 April 2000, John Carthy's 25-year-old sister, Marie Carthy, held a news conference. Describing her brother as "intelligent, popular, hardworking, witty, gentle and a man who never let anyone down", Marie Carthy called for a full independent and public inquiry into the death of John Carthy five days previously.

=== Garda inquiry ===
Marie Carthy's call came in response to two developments: first, the Garda investigation announced on the evening of the shooting on 20 April 2000 and, second, and more importantly, the Gardaí revelation that they would not make this report public. In a statement issued in response to public concern about the shooting, An Garda Síochána said that, under the Coroners Act of 1962, they were proceeding to hold an inquest into the death of the John Carthy.

=== FBI inquiry ===
Coming under pressure to make their internal investigation findings public, the Gardaí requested the FBI in the United States to investigate their handling of the shooting. On 29 June 2000, the FBI reported their findings to the Garda Commissioner, Pat Byrne. The five-member FBI investigation concluded that the main problem with the Gardaí's operations on the day was that they waited too long to fatally shoot Mr. Carthy, and that he should not have been allowed to cross into the inner perimeter, putting unarmed Garda in the outer perimeter at risk and that ultimately use of deadly force was appropriate to protect themselves and others. In the words of the FBI report, "Garda personnel repeatedly and emphatically ordered Mr. Carthy to halt and throw down his weapon. Despite these warnings, Mr. Carthy was allowed to continue undeterred beyond the wall which served as one side of the inner perimeter and walk toward the outer perimeter which was manned in part by unarmed Garda officers. ... to allow Mr. Carthy to cross the inner perimeter armed after he had repeatedly ignored warnings and had previously aimed and fired his shotgun at Garda officers was inconsistent with accepted law enforcement practices in the United States."

=== Oireachtas Subcommittee inquiry ===
On 8 March 2001 and responding to the growing disillusionment and distrust at the idea that the Garda were investigating themselves, the Irish government, still rejecting calls for a full public inquiry, instead established an Oireachtas subcommittee to investigate the shooting. The committee had seven members: Seán Ardagh, T.D. (FF) (Chair); Marian McGuinness, T.D. (FF); John McGuinness, T.D. (FF); Alan Shatter, T.D. (FG); Monica Barnes, T.D. (FG); Brendan Howlin, T.D. (Lab) and Senator Denis Donovan (FF).

However, on 23 November 2001, the High Court of Ireland deemed this subcommittee of both houses of the Irish parliament to be unconstitutional. The state's appeal, on 11 April 2002, of this decision to the Supreme Court of Ireland failed when the latter body found in favour of 36 Gardaí who challenged the right of this particular committee to call them. The ground upon which The Supreme Court had ruled this committee unconstitutional was that to conduct an inquiry which could lead "to adverse findings of fact and conclusions (including a finding of unlawful killing) as to the personal culpability of an individual not a member of the Oireachtas so as to impugn their good name is ultra vires in that the holding of such an inquiry is not within the inherent powers of the Oireachtas". The Thirtieth Amendment of the Constitution Bill 2011 was intended to reverse this ruling.

== The Barr Tribunal ==
Within a week of this judgment, by 17 April 2002, a motion was proposed and passed in Dáil Éireann and seconded in Seanad Éireann: "That Dáil Éireann [Seanad Éireann in its Resolution] resolves that it is expedient that a tribunal be established under the Tribunals of Inquiry (Evidence) Acts, 1921 to 2002, to enquire into the following definite matter of urgent public importance: – the facts and circumstances surrounding the fatal shooting of John Carthy at Abbeylara, Co Longford on 20 April 2000".

Out of this motion came the Carthy family's requested public investigation into John Carthy's death. Led by a former High Court judge, Robert Barr, it followed the pattern of other Irish Tribunals of Inquiry, becoming known as the Barr Tribunal in reference to the surname of its sole member. The Carthy family immediately welcomed the powers and scope of the tribunal.

On 20 July 2006 the report of Mr. Justice Robert Barr was released. The report did not just examine the siege itself but all related factors in the light of international practice. It was noted that Mr. Justice Barr went out of his way to investigate the siege with a view to complete thoroughness, in contrast to the quick and casual nature of previous investigations.

The tribunal found that several events had occurred in John's life to make him perceive that things were getting progressively worse for him. The report included minute details of the siege and Carthy's life, right down to a heartbreaking letter he wrote his girlfriend after their breakup, apologising to her for being hot-tempered with her, explaining that he often found it difficult to control his disorder. The breakup with his girlfriend, loss of employment, and most importantly, a false arrest combined with assault in custody, combined with his gun being taken as a result of Garda subterfuge, on foot of a report, not properly investigated at the time and subsequently proven false, that he had threatened to shoot children in the Handball Alley, which he had used, and which he had been central to restoring. The Tribunal concluded that the conduct of local Garda towards him in these incidents was the central theme behind his distrust of the force throughout the siege.

On the actual siege itself the report had the following central conclusions:

- It exonerated the ERU team of any legal culpability for John Carthy's death and concluded that they acted lawfully in genuine fear for safety of those in the area in the discharge of their firearms on the day. The tribunal concluded that as far as the negotiator and ERU team knew, Carthy was a clear and present danger to everyone around him. Indeed, the Tribunal noted that one of the two officers to fire on Carthy, Sergeant Jackson, broke with Garda rules of engagement and international practice by not shooting at Carthy's torso ('centre mass'), as police are trained to, in order to hit the central nervous system to incapacitate the threat quickly. In evidence Sergeant Jackson said he made this decision in a desperate attempt to neutralize John Carthy as a threat without killing him. However, two shots to the legs did not halt him, so a further shot to the torso was fired, which also did not stop him, and thus a final fourth shot was fired. The tribunal concluded there was no fifth shot as some had speculated.
- Despite exonerating the ERU team itself the Tribunal found critical failures by the higher-ranking Garda in charge of the siege. The Tribunal found that due to Garda command incompetence, critical information about Carthy's call to his friend Kevin Ireland, which should have reached the Garda negotiator and might have allowed the siege to end peacefully, was not passed on. The tribunal further found that the scene commander failed to properly plan for an uncontrolled (armed) exit by John Carthy and that some of the instructions given to local and ERU officers were 'vague'. It found that the scene commander failed to properly consult with mental health professionals and that he assumed that when Carthy could not name a specific solicitor that getting one anyway would be a 'waste of time'. The tribunal was of the view this avenue should have been explored, via the family solicitor or other solicitor that John had used in the past. The Tribunal concluded that in future an ERU team leader of higher rank should be in charge in future such situations, regardless of the rank of others in the area, as they were the most experienced and skilled to make these decisions. Scene commanders' failure to properly consult psychological professionals was criticized.
- The Tribunal concluded that while less-lethal (incorrectly called non-lethal) weaponry is available to police forces worldwide, there was an incorrect public perception of how easy it is to use this equipment to incapacitate someone. However, the Tribunal concluded that attack dogs would have been a viable response to the siege and could have dragged Carthy to the ground, even if he had shot one of them, for long enough to permit the ERU team to move in and disarm him. It was strongly recommended that an attack dog unit be attached to the ERU as soon as possible. No such unit was available in Ireland at the time.
- The Tribunal concluded, in consultation with experts and mental health professionals, that Carthy's exit was not a 'suicide by cop' and that he likely was not trying to attack anyone on the road (as he had passed ERU team members without confronting them) but that he was possibly trying to get further down the road to surrender the weapon to a third party like a member of his family, that due to his animosity towards the police he would never have surrendered it to them.

However, it was conceded that the ERU team on the day had no way of guessing what Carthy's intentions were and could not have let him exit the outer perimeter with a loaded shotgun that he had been discharging frequently for two days.

- In addition to the above findings, the Barr Tribunal was particularly critical of the Irish media. Judge Barr found the RTÉ's Five Seven Live radio show was particularly irresponsible in naming John Carthy and Barr adjudged that "the facts and circumstances surrounding the fatal shooting of John Carthy as specified in the Tribunal’s Terms of Reference include matters which add[ed] to or could have potential for aggravating the deceased’s apparently serious mental distress which became progressively more severe as the episode at Abbeylara continued (vide the evidence of Dr. John Sheehan and other psychiatrists given at the Tribunal), and in consequence the potential for undermining the possibility of successful dialogue between the Garda negotiator and John Carthy which might have avoided the circumstances that gave rise to his death." In addition to RTÉ, the Sunday Independent was also strongly criticised, particularly an article entitled Dramatic New Evidence in Abbeylara Case with beneath it a subsidiary headline "Abbeylara family row over land may have affected siege victim Carthy’s state of mind prior to his death". That article was published on 31 October 2004 and Justice Barr found it to be slanderous to the Carthy family. The Barr Tribunal opined that the Sunday Independent journalist in question, Maeve Sheehan, was more concerned with defending the Garda position at any cost than being fair to the Carthy family. The report noted that her "article also contained other information apparently favourable to the Garda case that the connection between the deceased and his sister, Marie, was not the close caring relationship indicated in evidence by various witnesses". The Tribunal noted that the Carthy family had sued that particular newspaper for the article in question, and that the Sunday Independent had settled out of court before trial.

== Reaction to Barr Tribunal ==
Taoiseach, Bertie Ahern made a public apology to the Carthy family on behalf of the Irish government. The Minister for Justice, Michael McDowell, admitted that the Carthy family was entitled to a profound expression of regret from the Irish State. Garda Ombudsman Commission member, Conor Brady, accepted that the Barr report outlined "an unspeakable catalogue of personal failure by individual Gardaí" and expressed his view that it was disturbing to see some Gardaí involved in a "culture of cover-up and circling the wagons".

However, the Garda Representative Association remained unapologetic, noting that while Mr. Justice Barr had four years to compile his report, officers at the scene had only seconds to make up their minds. Symbolically, six weeks before the report was first due, the chief negotiator on the day, Detective Inspector Michael Jackson, was recommended by Garda management for promotion to the rank of superintendent. The Gardaí had been reluctant to give an apology, with the Garda Commissioner Noel Conroy omitting an apology from a statement issued on 21 July 2006: "The outcome of the siege at Abbeylara, which resulted in the death of John Carthy is very much regretted. As previously expressed at both the tribunal and the inquest, the sympathies of all members of An Garda Síochána are offered to Mrs Rose Carthy and the extended Carthy family". At a subsequent press conference, John Carthy's sister, Marie, lambasted the Garda's refusal to give an apology, saying that it was regrettable that the Gardaí was still not accepting responsibility for her brother's death. Finally, on 10 August 2006, the Garda Síochána issued an apology to the Carthy family. They were, the statement said, "truly apologetic for the loss of John's life".
