= R396 road (Ireland) =

Road in Ireland

Coordinates: 53.728767°N 7.406454°W

R396 road
- Bóthar R396
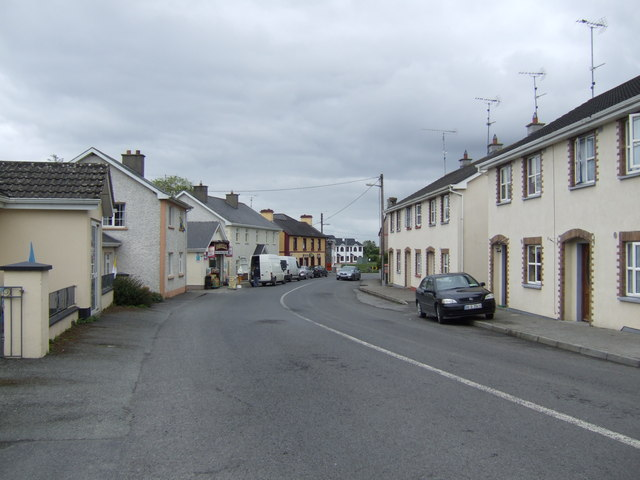
- R396 passing through Abbeylara

Route information
- Length: 11.1 km (6.9 mi)

Major junctions
- From: R194 Granard
- Passes through Abbeylara; Crosses River Inny and enters County Westmeath
- To: R479 Coole

Location
- Country: Ireland

Highway system
- Roads in Ireland; Motorways; Primary; Secondary; Regional

The R396 road is a regional road in Ireland, located in County Longford and County Westmeath.
