= Longford Senior Football Championship =

Annual Gaelic football competition

- Founded: 1890
- Title holders: Clonguish GAA (13th title)
- Most titles: Longford Slashers (16 titles)
- Sponsors: Peter Hanley Motors

The Longford Senior Football Championship is an annual Gaelic Athletic Association competition organised by Longford GAA among the Senior grade Gaelic football clubs in County Longford, Ireland. The winning club qualifies to represent its county in the Leinster Senior Club Football Championship, the winner of which progresses to the All-Ireland Senior Club Football Championship.

The current champions are Clonguish, winning their thirteenth SFC title in October 2026. The Longford Slashers club has won more titles (16) than any other club, while Clonguish holds the record for most consecutive wins (4) in 1962, 1963, 1964 and 1965.

== History ==
The Longford Senior Football Championship was first played in 1890, and a total of 105 championships have been successfully completed between 1890 and 2022. The Seán Connolly cup is presented to the winners of the Longford Senior Football Championship. The cup was first presented in 1960.

== Roll of honour ==
#	Name	Wins	Years won
1	Longford Slashers	16	1954, 1956, 1957, 1959, 1961, 1971, 1975, 1979, 1980, 1989, 1990, 1991, 1994, 2010, 2011, 2013
2	Killoe Young Emmets	15	1907, 1911, 1913, 1915, 1960, 1988, 1993, 1995, 2012, 2014, 2015, 2019, 2020, 2023, 2025
2	Fr. Manning Gaels	15	1927, 1928, 1932, 1937, 1939, 1940, 1943, 1945, 1951, 1953, 1955, 1996, 1997, 1998, 2001
4	Clonguish	13	1962, 1963, 1964, 1965, 1968, 1969, 1972, 1973, 1981, 2003, 2004, 2009, 2026
5	St. Marys Granard	11	1929, 1930, 1931, 1933, 1934, 1935, 1941, 1966, 1967, 1970, 1982
6	Colmcille	7	1890, 1938, 1949, 1952, 1958, 2008, 2022
7	Mullinalaghta St Columba's	6	1948, 1950, 2016, 2017, 2018, 2021
8	Ardagh St Patrick's	4	1936, 1942, 1978, 1987
8	Dromard	4	1946, 1999, 2005, 2007
8	Cashel	4	1977, 1983, 1984, 1986
9	Mostrim	3	1974, 1985, 1992
9	Abbeylara	3	2000, 2006, 2024
10	Longford Leo Caseys	2	1904, 1905
10	Longford Wanderers	2	1944, 1947
11	Ballymahon	1	2002
11	Rathcline	1	1976
11	Ballinamuck '98s	1	1920
11	Seán Connolly's (Clonbroney)	1	1919

== List of finals ==
Year	Winner	Score	Runner-up	Score
2026	Clonguish	1-20	Killoe Young Emmets	1-06
2025	Killoe Young Emmets	2-09	Colmcille	1–11
2024 (AET)	Abbeylara	2–10	Colmcille	1-07
2023	Killoe Young Emmets	1-08	Clonguish	0–10
2022	Colmcille	1-07	Mullinalaghta St Columba's	0-08
2021	Mullinalaghta St Columba's	0–15	Mostrim	0-06
2020	Killoe Young Emmets	0–13	Longford Slashers	1-08
2019	Killoe Young Emmets	0–12	Longford Slashers	0–11
2018	Mullinalaghta St Columba's	2-14 (0-06)	Abbeylara	1-02 (0-06)
2017	Mullinalaghta St Columba's	0–13	Abbeylara	1-07
2016	Mullinalaghta St Columba's	1-08	Abbeylara	0-08
2015	Killoe Young Emmets	1–14	Abbeylara	1–11
2014	Killoe Young Emmets	2–11	Mullinalaghta St Columba's	0–10
2013	Longford Slashers	1–11	Dromard	1-09
2012	Killoe Young Emmets	0-15 (0-07)	Longford Slashers	0-12 (0-07)
2011	Longford Slashers	0-07	Clonguish	0-06
2010	Longford Slashers	0–11	Dromard	1-05
2009	Clonguish	0-09 (1–11)	Dromard	1-05 (1–11)
2008	Colmcille	0–13	Longford Slashers	0-07
2007	Dromard	1-08	Colmcille	2-04
2006	Abbeylara	1-09	Longford Slashers	0–10
2005	Dromard	1–14	Fr. Manning Gaels	0–12
2004	Clonguish	1–15	Fr. Manning Gaels	0-05
2003	Clonguish	0-11 (0–11)	Ballymahon	1-01 (1-08)
2002	Ballymahon	1–11	Clonguish	0–12
2001	Fr. Manning Gaels	1-09	St Marys, Granard	0-06
2000	Abbeylara	2-06	Fr Manning Gaels	0-04
1999	Dromard	1-10 (1-07)	Abbeylara	1-08 (0–10)
1998	Fr. Manning Gaels	1–11	Abbeylara	2-07
1997	Fr. Manning Gaels	0–12	Longford Slashers	0-06
1996	Fr. Manning Gaels	0–15	Ardagh St Patrick's	0-08
1995	Killoe Young Emmets	0–11	Ardagh St Patrick's	1-05
1994	Longford Slashers	2–11	Colmcille	1–11
1993	Killoe Young Emmets	0-09	St Mary's Granard	0-07
1992	Mostrim	3-09	Seán Connollys	1-07
1991	Longford Slashers	1–13	Mostrim	3-06
1990	Longford Slashers	2-18 (0-07)	Ardagh St Patrick's	1-11 (1-04)
1989	Longford Slashers	2–10	Mostrim	1-07
1988	Killoe Young Emmets	3-07	Mostrim	1-07
1987	Ardagh St Patrick's	2-06	Killoe Young Emmets	1-08
1986	Cashel	2–10	Mostrim	1-08
1985	Mostrim	1-05 (2-05) (1-05)	Ardagh St Patricks	0-06 (2-05) (0-08)
1984	Cashel	0-09	Mostrim	0-05
1983	Cashel	1-09	Killoe Young Emmets	1-08
1982	St Mary's Granard	4-05	Ardagh St Patrick's	1-09
1981	Clonguish	2-02	Longford Slashers	1-02
1980	Longford Slashers	1-07	Cashel	1-05
1979	Longford Slashers	1-07	Rathcline	0-09
1978	Ardagh St Patrick's	3–15	Longford Slashers	0–10
1977	Cashel	1-08	Longford Slashers	1-06
1976	Rathcline	2-07	Clonguish	0-06
1975	Longford Slashers	2–13	Mostrim	2-05
1974	Mostrim	2-06	Ardagh St Patrick's	1-05
1973	Clonguish	1–15	St Martins (Carrickedmond/Kenagh)	0-05
1972	Clonguish	0–15	St Mary's Granard	1-06
1971	Longford Slashers	0-07	St Martin's (Carrickedmond/Kenagh)	1-03
1970	St Mary's Granard	0–10	Clonguish	0-07
1969	Clonguish	2-06	St Mary's Granard	1-07
1968	Clonguish	0–12	Longford Slashers	1-08
1967	St Mary's Granard	1-07	Carrickedmond	0-06
1966	St Mary's Granard	0-09	Éire Óg (Drumlish Young Irelands)	0-02
1965	Clonguish	0–11	St Mary's Granard	2-04
1964	Clonguish	1–10	Longford Slashers	1-02
1963	Clonguish	2-07	Longford Slashers	1-04
1962	Clonguish	2–10	St Mary's Granard	0-09
1961	Longford Slashers	2-08	Éire Óg (Drumlish Young Irelands)	0-04
1960	Killoe Young Emmets	2–10	Longford Slashers	1-06
1959	Longford Slashers	3-05 (1-05)	Killoe Young Emmets	1-05 (1-05)
1958	Colmcille	1-04	Drumlish Young Irelands	1-02
1957	Longford Slashers	2-07	Rathcline	0-04
1956	Longford Slashers	2-07	Colmcille	0-06
1955	Drumlish Young Irelands	2-07	Ardagh St Patrick's	0-03
1954	Longford Slashers	1-06	Seán Connollys	1-03
1953	Drumlish Young Irelands	2-06 (0-07)	Colmcille	1-07 (0-07)
1952	Colmcille	2-08 (1-03)	Mullinalaghta	1-05 (0-06)
1951	Drumlish Young Irelands	4-03	Mullinalaghta	1-08
1950	Mullinalaghta	2-02	Ballymahon	0-04
1949	Colmcille	3-07	Mullinalaghta	0-04
1948	Mullinalaghta	1–12	Longford Wanderers	1-03
1947	Longford Wanderers	2-04	United Gaels (Granard/Abbeylara)	0-05
1946	Dromard	1-04 (0-00)	Ballymahon	0-04 (0-00)
1945	Drumlish	1-07	Longford Wanderers	1-06
1944	Longford Wanderers	2-04	Drumlish	2-03
1943	Drumlish	0-06	Mullinalaghta	0-02
1942	Ardagh St Patrick's	5-07	Colmcille	1-01
1941	St Mary's Granard	2-08	Ardagh St Patrick's	1-06
1940	Drumlish	4–10	St Mary's Granard	0-04
1939	Drumlish	(Awarded)	Ardagh St Patrick's	
1938	Colmcille	1-05	Whiterock Slashers	2-01
1937	Drumlish	3-06	Killashee St Brigid's	1-04
1936	Ardagh St Patrick's	1-05	Drumlish	0-05
1935	St Mary's Granard	3-06	Ardagh St Patrick's	2-06
1934	St Mary's Granard	0-08	United Gaels (Clonguish/Wanderers)	0-06
1933	St Mary's Granard	0–13	United Gaels (Clonguish/Wanderers)	0-05
1932	Drumlish		St Mary's Granard	
1931	St Mary's Granard	1-09	Edgeworthstown Young Irelands	0-03
1930	St Mary's Granard	1-05	Longford Wanderers	1-03
1929	St Mary's Granard	1-03	Longford Wanderers	0-02
1928	Drumlish	(Awarded)	Longford Wanderers	
1927	Drumlish	1-01	Ballinamuck '98s	0-01
1926	No Championship			
1925	No Championship			
1924	No Championship			
1923	No Championship			
1922	No Championship			
1921	No Championship			
1920	Ballinamuck '98s	1-04	Longford Wanderers	0-00
1919	Clonbroney	1-03 (1-01)	Killoe Young Emmets	0-03 (1-01)
1918	No Championship			
1917	No Championship			
1916	No Championship			
1915	Killoe Young Emmets	3-00	Clonguish Gallowglasses	0-03
1914	No Championship			
1913	Killoe Young Emmets	0-02	Longford Commercials	0-01
1912	No Championship			
1911	Killoe Young Emmets	0-01	Edgeworthstown Volunteers	0-00
1910	No Championship			
1909	No Championship			
1908	No Championship			
1907	Killoe Young Emmets	1-08 (0-04)	Drumlish & Ballinamuck '98s	0-01 (1-01)
1906	No Championship			
1905	Longford Leo Caseys	1-07	Edgeworthstown Volunteers	0-03
1904	Longford Leo Caseys	2-07	Killoe Young Emmets	0-01
1903	No Championship			
1902	No Championship			
1901	No Championship			
1900	No Championship			
1899	No Championship			
1898	No Championship			
1897	No Championship			
1896	No Championship			
1895	No Championship			
1894	No Championship			
1893	No Championship			
1892	No Championship			
1891	Championship not completed			
1890	Columbkille St Columbkille's (Colmcille)	1-00	Rathcline John Martins	0-04
