= Paddy O'Shea =

Irish Gaelic footballer

Personal information
- Native name: Páidí Ó Sé (Irish)
- Born: 12 April 1981 (age 45) Cork, Ireland
- Height: 6 ft 4 in (193 cm)

Sport
- Sport: Gaelic football
- Position: Goalkeeper
Club
- Years: Club
- 1999-present: St Vincent's
Club titles
- Cork titles: 0
Inter-county
Years	County	Apps (scores)
2007-present	Cork	3 (0-00)
Inter-county titles
- Munster titles: 0
- All-Irelands: 1
- NFL: 1
- All Stars: 0

Paddy O'Shea (born 12 April 1981 in Cork, Ireland) is an Irish sportsperson. He plays Gaelic football with his local club St Vincent's and was substitute goalkeeper on the senior Cork county team from 2002 onwards.
