= Abbeylara =

Village in County Longford, Ireland

Abbeylara Mainistir Leathrátha
- Village
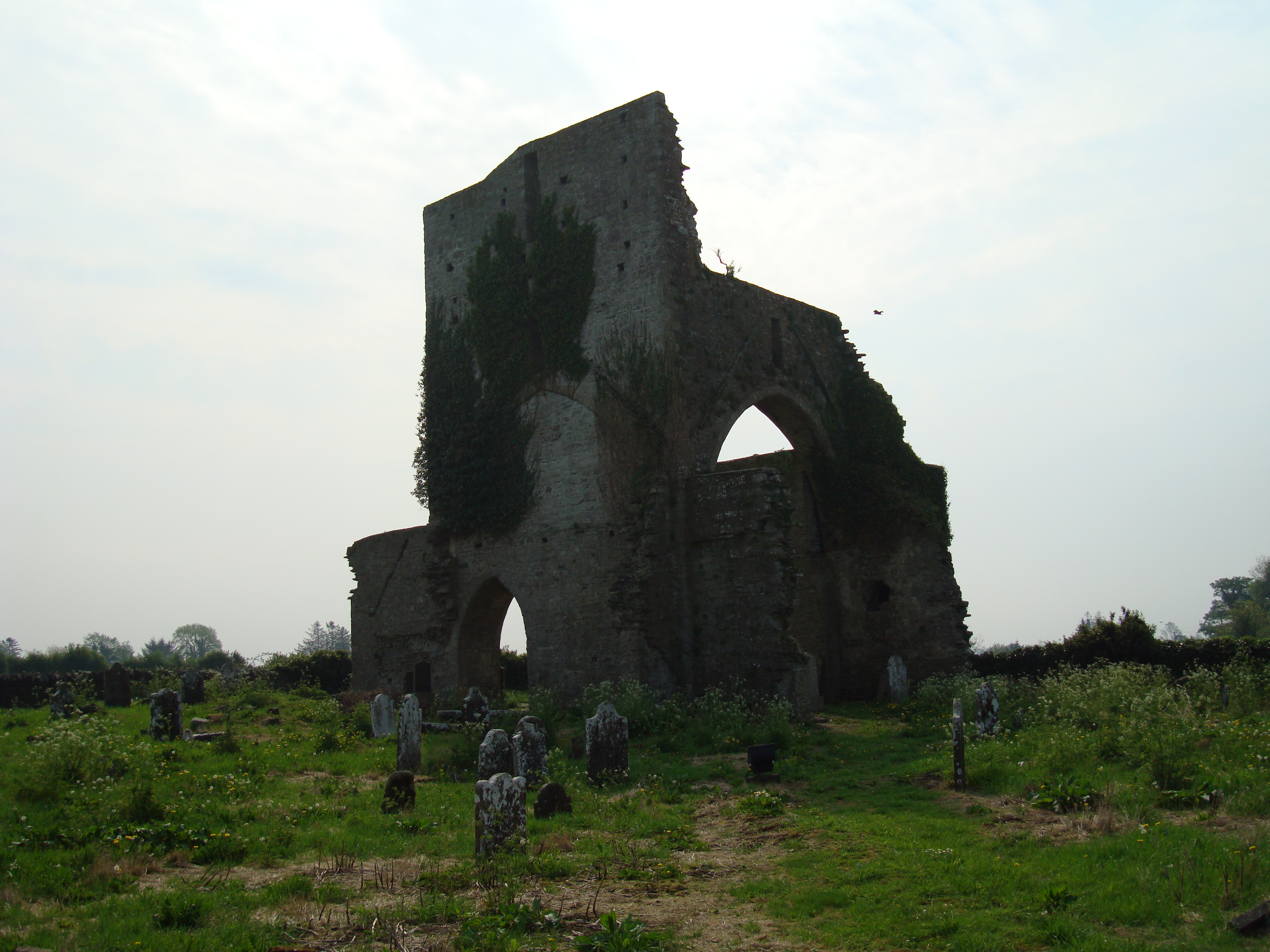
- Abbeylara Abbey

- Location in Ireland
- Coordinates: 53°45′53″N 7°26′46″W
- Country: Ireland
- Province: Leinster
- County: County Longford
- Elevation: 82 m (269 ft)
- Time zone: UTC+0 (WET)
  - Summer (DST): UTC-1 (IST (WEST))
- Irish Grid Reference: N363797

Abbeylara (Irish: Mainistir Leathrátha, meaning 'abbey of the half rath or little rath') is a village in County Longford, Ireland. It is at the eastern end of the county, three kilometres east of Granard, on the R396 road. The village is in a townland and civil parish of the same name.

== Name and history ==
Abbeylara's name is derived from a monastery, the great Abbey of Lerha, founded in 1205 by Hiberno-Norman magnate, Risteárd de Tiúit, for Cistercian monks. The monastery was dissolved in 1539, although its ruins are still apparent on approach to the village.

An ancient earthwork, the Duncla (Irish Dún-chlaí meaning "fortified ditch") or Black Pig's Dyke, which runs south-eastwards from Lough Gowna to Lough Kinale, goes through the larger parish of Abbeylara, and passes about one kilometre north of the village.

On 20 April 2000, the Gardaí (police) shot dead local man John Carthy in a siege at his home.

== Sport ==
Abbeylara GFC, the local Gaelic football club, was first formed under the Abbeylara name in the 1920s.

The village is close to Lough Kinale and Lough Derragh, which have supplies of trout, tench, bream and pike. As a result, the area attracts anglers and local angling clubs hold regular competitions.

== See also ==
- List of towns and villages in Ireland
- Barr Tribunal - Inquiry into the John Carthy siege and shooting of 2000
