= Longford GAA =

County board of the Gaelic Athletic Association in Ireland

- Irish: An Longfort
- Nickname(s): Midlanders
- Province: Leinster
- Dominant sport: Gaelic football
- Ground(s): Pearse Park, Longford
- County colours: Royal blue Gold

County teams
- NFL: Division 4 (2024)
- NHL: Division 3B (2024)
- Football Championship: Tailteann Cup
- Hurling Championship: Lory Meagher Cup
- Ladies' Gaelic football: Mary Quinn Memorial Cup

The Longford County Board of the Gaelic Athletic Association (Irish: Cumann Lúthchleas Gael Coiste Chontae an Longfort) or Longford GAA is one of the 32 county boards of the GAA in Ireland, and is responsible for Gaelic games in County Longford. The county board is also responsible for the Longford county teams. Longford teams wear blue and gold, and were the first and the only county to be officially permitted to wear gold by the GAA.

The county football team won its only National Football League title in 1966 with a one-point victory over Galway in the Home Final and an aggregate win over New York in the Final. The team won its only Leinster Senior Football Championship title in 1968, with a 3–9 to 1–4 win over Laois.

== Clubs ==
The county board oversees 22 GAA clubs, the lowest number of any county in Ireland. The current total of 22 clubs is down from 24 in 2009 which at the time was the smallest in the country, below Sligo, which had 26 back then and now has 23 clubs.

(F) Football | (H) Hurling | (HB) Handball | (C) Camogie

- Abbeylara (F/HB)
- Ardagh Moydow (F)
- Ballymahon (F)*
- Ballymore (F)
- Carrickedmond (F)
- Cashel (F)
- Clonguish (F/H/HB)
- Colmcille (F)
- Dromard (F)
- Fr. Manning Gaels (F/HB)
- Kenagh (F)
- Killoe Young Emmets (F)
- Legan Sarsfields (F)
- Longford Slashers (F/H)
- Mostrim (D)
- Mullinalaghta St Columba's (F)
- Rathcline (F)
- Seán Connollys (F)
- St. Brigid's Killashee (F)
- St. Mary's Granard (F)
- St. Munis Forgney (F)*
- Young Grattans (F)

(* St. Munis Forgney & Ballymahon compete as a Group Team in adult competition since 2022)

Three hurling clubs exist within the above list of GAA clubs:

- Clonguish Gaels
- Longford Slashers
- Wolfe Tones (Mostrim)

== Football ==
=== Clubs ===
11 clubs contest the Longford Senior Football Championship.

Killoe Young Emmets are the current Longford Senior Football champions (as of 2025).

Mullinalaghta St Columba's won the Leinster Senior Club Football Championship in 2018.

=== County team ===
Longford won the National Football League in 1966, then the 1968 Leinster Senior Football Championship. The county has never won the All-Ireland Senior Football Championship.

== Hurling ==
=== Clubs ===
3 clubs contest the Longford Senior Hurling Championship.

Longford Slashers are the current Longford Senior Hurling champions (as of 2025).

=== County team ===
Like most of its neighbours, Longford have struggled to compete with the bigger counties as they only have three Hurling teams in the county, Slashers, Wolfe Tones and Clonguish. The county team won the National League Division 3 title in 2002, In 2005 & 2006 they won the Leinster Shield. They won the Lory Meagher Cup, for the first time, in Croke Park on 3 July 2010 and won on a scoreline 1 – 20 to Donegal 1 – 12.

Liam Griffin has said the GAA should be ashamed of itself over its failure in the promotion of hurling.

Australia is 24 hours away, yet we can create a new game with the Aussie Rules lads. Longford and Leitrim are right here, yet we largely ignore them and many others too when it comes to promoting hurling. The new D. J. Carey could be living in Longford, Leitrim or Donegal, but we'll never know. We have failed him. [...] If someone can market coloured gripe water, call it Coca-Cola and clean up worldwide, we should be able to sell hurling in Longford.

=== Leinster SHC ===
Longford competed in just two seasons, with a walkover to Wexford in the 1902 season (played in November 1903) and a loss to Westmeath in the 1903 season (played in July 1904). After 1904 Longford played in Junior Hurling Championship. Longford remains the only county in Leinster never to win a provincial hurling championship at any grade.

==== Matches ====
- 1902: Longford scr. - w/o Wexford
- 1903: Longford 1-00 - 2-09 Westmeath

=== Championship Titles ===
- Lory Meagher Cup: (2)
  - Champions (2): 2010, 2014
  - Runners-Up (3): 2013, 2022, 2024
- All Ireland Minor C Championship (2)
  - 1997, 2000
- All Ireland Juvenile C Championship (2)
  - 1982, 1984

=== League Titles ===
- National Hurling League Division 3 (1)
  - 2002
- National Hurling League Division 3B (3)
  - 2013, 2017, 2019
- National Hurling League Division 4 (2)
  - 1984, 1998
- All Ireland Minor Hurling League Division 3 (1)
  - 1997 ?

=== Provincial Cups & Shields ===
- Kehoe Cup (1)
  - 2018
- Leinster Junior Hurling Shield (2)
  - 2005, 2006
