= Mullinalaghta St Columba's GAA =

Longford-based Gaelic games club

Mullinalaghta St Columba's
- Naomh Columba, Mullach na Leachta
- Founded: 1889
- County: Longford
- Nickname: The Half-Parish, Columbas, Mull
- Colours: Maroon and white
- Grounds: The Laurels, Derrycassan
- Coordinates: 53°49′20.77″N 7°31′38.76″W

Playing kits
Standard colours

Senior Club Championships
	All Ireland	Leinster champions	Longford champions
Football:	-	1	6

Mullinalaghta St Columba's is a Gaelic football club based in Mullinalaghta, County Longford, Ireland.

They have won the Longford Senior Football Championship on six occasions, most recently in 2021, having previously won the title in 1948, 1950, 2016, 2017 and 2018.

On the 9th of December 2018, they became the first Longford club to win the Leinster Senior Club Football Championship. They were the first Longford club to reach the Leinster final, and beat Kilmacud Crokes of Dublin on a scoreline of 1–8 to 1–6.

== History ==
The club was founded in 1889 as Mullinalaghta Leaguers and competed in the first Longford Senior Football Championship in 1890.

The club's first recorded title was an intermediate title in 1931 as Mullinalaghta.

The club was noted for its success during the 1940s and 1950s, winning the senior league in 1945 & five in a row league titles (1947 to 1951) and senior championship titles in 1948 & 1950 at county level.

The club went through very lean times from the mid-1950s through till late 1970s.

St Columba's name was added for the club to become Mullinalaghta St Columba's from 1955; the club crest shows a dove, the Latin translation of columba. Columba (AD 521–597) is credited with founding the Inchmore monastery on Lough Gowna, near to Mullinalaghta.

The club won a junior championship in 1977.

The club won an intermediate championship in 1990, Junior Championship in 1996, and Intermediate championships in 2000 & 2007.

== Achievements ==
- Leinster Senior Club Football Championship (1) 2018
- Longford Senior Football Championship (6) 1948, 1950, 2016, 2017. 2018, 2021
- Longford Intermediate Football Championship (4) 1931, 1990, 2000, 2007
- Longford Junior Football Championship (2) 1977, 1996
- Longford Senior Football League (Leader Cup) (12) 1945, 1947, 1948, 1949, 1950, 1951, 2013, 2016, 2017, 2019, 2021, 2023
- Longford All-County League Division 1 (5) 2017, 2018, 2019, 2021, 2023
