= Colmcille GFC =

Longford based GAA Club

Colmcille
- CLG Colmcille
- Founded: 1890
- County: Longford
- Colours: Green and Red
- Grounds: Fr. McGee Park
- Coordinates: 53°49′29″N 7°36′52″W

Playing kits
Standard colours

Senior Club Championships
	All Ireland	Leinster champions	Longford champions
Football:	-	-	7

Colmcille GFC (Gaelic Football Club) is a Gaelic Football and Ladies Gaelic Football club based in Aughnacliffe, County Longford, Ireland. Colmcille most recently won the Longford Senior Football Championship in 2022 defeating Mullinalaghta by a scoreline of 1-07 to 0-08.

== History ==
Colmcille GFC is named for Saint Colmcille (or Saint Columba) (AD 521–597) who founded Inchmore monastery on an island nearby on Lough Gowna. The club won the very first Longford Senior Football Championship in 1890 as Columbkille St. Columbkilles. They have won six more county senior titles since then, the latest in 2022.

Colmcille was one of Longford's first five Ladies Gaelic football teams, first playing in 1980.

They play home matches at Fr. McGee Park in Aghacordrinan, south of Aughnacliffe.

== Honours ==
=== Gaelic football ===
- Longford Senior Football Championship (7): 1890, 1938, 1949, 1952, 1958, 2008, 2022
- Longford Senior Football League (Leader Cup) (3): 1954, 1957, 1990
- Longford Senior ACFL Division 1 (3): 1990, 2020, 2022,2026
- Longford Senior ACFL Division 2 (1): 2024
- Longford Intermediate Football Championship (1): 1986
- Longford Junior Football Championship (4): 1937, 1979, 1998, 2020
- Longford U-21 Football Championship (4): 2001, 2002, 2003, 2015
- Longford Minor Football Championship (3): 1953, 1962, 1963
- Longford Juvenile Football Championship (3): 1955, 1960, 1997
- Longford Ladies Intermediate Football Championship (2): 2011, 2021
- Longford Ladies Junior Football Championship (2): 2010, 2019
- Longford Ladies Juvenile Football Championship (2): 1999, 2000
- Longford Ladies U-14 Football Championship (2): 1998, 1999

== Notable people ==
- Eugene McGee
- Sean Lynch
- Pearse Daly
- Declan C Reilly
