= Killoe Young Emmets =

Longford-based Gaelic games club

- Emmet Óg
- County: Longford
- Nickname: Killoe or Emmet Óg
- Colours: White and Green
- Grounds: Emmet Park
- Coordinates: 53°45′47.43″N 7°44′0.68″W

Playing kits
Standard colours

Senior Club Championships
	All Ireland	Leinster champions	Longford champions
Football:	0	0	15
Hurling:	0	0	1
Ladies' football:	0	0	8

Killoe Young Emmets (Irish: Emmet Óg Cill Eo) is a Gaelic Football and Ladies Gaelic Football club based in Killoe, County Longford, Ireland. Killoe are the 2025 Longford Senior and Junior Football champions. The club is also referred to by the Irish 'Emmet Óg' or by 'Killoe Emmet Óg'. Organised Gaelic Games in the Parish of Killoe can trace its origins back to 1889 and the formation of the Killoe Erins Pride GAA club.

Following a long period of no competition in Longford during the 1890s and early 1900s, the GAA was revived in Killoe in 1903 with the emergence of a club bearing the name Killoe Young Emmets. Killoe then competed in revived Senior Football Championship which was organised in 1904 and completed in 1905 and was the first official competition held in Longford since 1891. Killoe Young Emmets has won 15 Longford Senior Football Championship titles and 1 Longford Senior Hurling Championship title and has a thriving youth section called Killoe Óg which was formed in 1975, while the Killoe Ladies club was formed in 1980.

== History ==
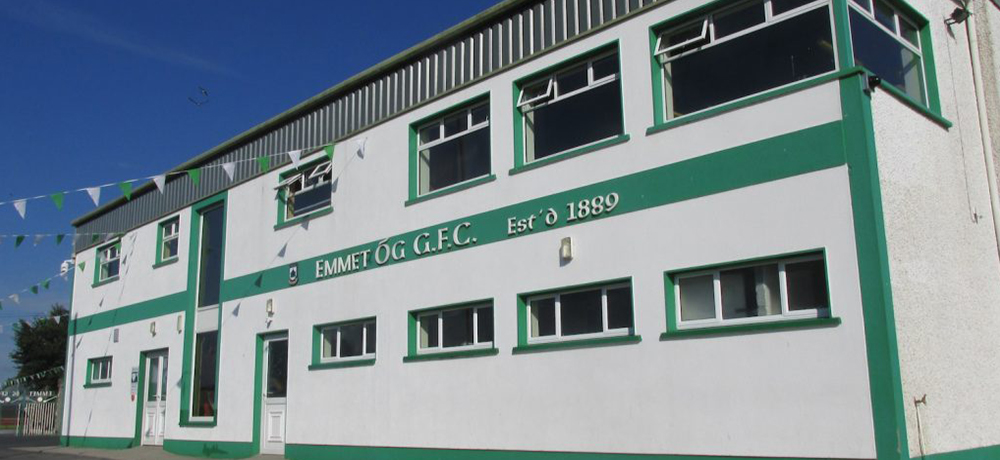
Emmet-Park

The first GAA club in the Killoe area was founded in 1889 as Killoe Erin's Hope (soon renamed Killoe Erin's Pride). The club is named after the Irish patriot Robert Emmet. The clubs crest shows 1889 as a nod to the origin year of the Killoe Erins Pride club, the first GAA club in Killoe parish. The earliest published record of a Killoe game was a tournament fixture between Killoe Erins Pride & Dromard O’Briens in Cornadrung in November 1889. The tournament in Colmcille included Drumlish Robert Emmets, Mullinalaghta Leaguers, Arva Davitts, Cornafean Tom Moroneys, Killoe Erin’s Pride, Dromard O’Briens, Mullahoran Milesians, Ballywillan Michael Davitts and Gowna West Breffnies. The club is based at Emmet Park with facilities including clubhouse, floodlit pitches, gym & meeting rooms which was officially opened by GAA President Peter Quinn in the company of then Taoiseach Albert Reynolds in June 1993.

Killoe participates across all Gaelic Football competition age groups in Longford. The club also participates in Scór competition, winning 34 County titles, 5 Leinster titles and 1 All-Ireland title in Scór na nÓg along with 32 County titles and 1 Leinster title in Scór Sinsir.

- Killoe GAA comprises Senior Club, Minor Club & Ladies Club, competing in Gaelic Football from Under 12 to Senior grades.
- Killoe's first titles are the Longford Senior Football Championship & Longford Senior Hurling Championship double in 1907.
- Killoe had notable success during the 1910's, winning Longford Senior Football titles in 1911, 1913 & 1915.
- Killoe played Junior in 1920s, 1930s, 1940s and much of 1950s, returning to Senior in late 1950s and contesting the 1959 SFC final before winning SFC in 1960.
- Killoe club was relegated to Intermediate in mid-1960s and won promoted back to Senior grade in 1977.
- Since last promotion to Senior grade in 1977, the club has won SFC titles in 1988, 1993, 1995, 2012, 2014, 2015, 2019, 2020, 2023 & 2025.
- Killoe played in the Leinster Senior Club Football Championship in 1988, 1993, 1995, 2012, 2014, 2015 & 2019, reaching the Semi-Final twice.
- Two Killoe players have been nominated for All Stars Awards: John 'Speedy' McCormack (1984, 1985, 1986) & Michael Quinn (2012).
- Killoe's Seán McCormack was joint top scorer (4-32) in the 2013 National Football League, along with Dublin's Bernard Brogan.
- Killoe Ladies jointly lead the Roll of Honour for most SFC titles in Longford (8) and won the Leinster Club IFC title in 2008.

== Notable players ==
- Michael Quinn - All Star nominee
- Sean McCormack - inter-county footballer
- John ‘Speedy’ McCormack - 3 x All Star Nominee, Railway Cup Winner

== Killoe Young Emmets ==
(Honours updated to end of 2025)

#	Competition	Titles	Years won
1	Senior Championship	15	1907, 1911, 1913, 1915, 1960, 1988, 1993, 1995, 2012, 2014, 2015, 2019, 2020, 2023, 2025
2	Senior B Championship	4	1983, 1987, 2013, 2014
3	Hurling Championship	1	1907
4	Leader Cup (SFL)	8	1959, 1961, 1985, 2005, 2010, 2012, 2014, 2015
5	ACFL Division 1	3	2005, 2010, 2016
6	ACFL Division 2	1	2008
7	ACFL Division 3	7	2010, 2015, 2016, 2019, 2021, 2023, 2025
8	ACFL Division 3 Cup	5	2002, 2013, 2015, 2016, 2025
9	ACFL Division 4 (R1/1A)	9	1984, 1992, 1994, 1996, 1997, 2001, 2014, 2015, 2016
10	ACFL Division 5 (R2/2A)	2	1983, 2021
11	ACFL Division 6 (R3/3A)	2	2017, 2018
12	Bertie Allen Cup	1	2007
13	Intermediate Championship	1	1977
14	Intermediate B Championship	1	2016
15	Intermediate League	1	1976
16	Special Intermediate League	1	1977
17	Junior A Championship	6	1931, 1951, 1957, 1988, 2018, 2025
18	Junior B Championship	7	1991, 1992, 1993, 1994, 1995, 1997, 1999
19	Junior C Championship	1	2025
20	Junior League	3	1931, 1939, 1956*
21	Special Junior League	2	1993, 1994
22	U21 A Championship	7	1979, 2011, 2012, 2014, 2016, 2018, 2019
23	U21 League	1	1984

* 1956 Junior League title was won as Killoe Slashers (Amalgamation with Whiterock Slashers)

== Killoe Óg ==
(Honours updated to end of 2025)

#	Competition	Titles	Years won
1	Minor A Championship	9	1936, 1978*, 1985*, 1990*, 2005, 2009, 2012, 2017, 2018
2	Minor B Championship	1	2006
3	Minor League Division 1	9	1985, 2004, 2009, 2010, 2015, 2017, 2018, 2019, 2021
4	Minor League Division 2	9	1976, 1978, 1981, 1982, 1984, 1987, 1995, 1999*, 2000*
5	Special Minor League	6	2009, 2012, 2014, 2015, 2016, 2019
6	U17 Regional Cup	1	2016
7	Juvenile A Championship	8	1980, 1983, 2007, 2010, 2011, 2015, 2016, 2017
8	Juvenile B Championship	2	1995, 2024
9	Juvenile League Division 1	10	1980, 2002, 2005, 2007, 2008, 2010, 2014, 2015, 2016, 2019
10	Juvenile League Division 2	5	1980, 1983, 1985, 1990, 1998
11	Juvenile Special League	3	2008, 2009(?), 2012
12	Juvenile Leinster League	1	2011
13	U15 Regional Cup	1	2016
14	U14 A Championship	9	1981, 2000, 2001, 2008, 2009, 2012, 2015, 2017, 2018
15	U14 B Championship	1	2025
16	U14 League Division 1	9	2000, 2001, 2008, 2009, 2012, 2013, 2014, 2015, 2018
17	County Feile Peile na nÓg	5	2000, 2012, 2014, 2015, 2018
18	All-Ireland Feile (Div 4)	1	2012
19	U13 League Division 1**	3	2011, 2012, 2013
20	U13 League Division 2**	1	2013
21	U13 Regional Cup**	2	2017, 2018
22	U13 Regional Shield**	1	2016
23	U12 League/Championship	9	1993, 1999, 2002, 2004, 2009, 2010, 2012, 2013, 2016
24	U12 Division 1 Shield	1	2017
25	U12 Division 4 League	1	2011
26	Longford/Leitrim U12 Cup	1	2015
27	Longford/Leitrim U12 Shield	2	2017, 2018

* Denotes underage titles won as part of an amalgamation with other club(s)
** Denotes separate U13 competition prior to U14 changing to U13 in 2021 & 2022

Amalgamations Clarified:

- Minor Championship 1978: Killoe Region (Killoe + Clonbroney + St. Mels)
- Minor Championship 1985: Killoe Region (Killoe + St. Mels)
- Minor Championship 1990: Killoe + Clonbroney
- Minor League Div 2 1999: Camlin Rovers (Killoe + Ballymore)
- Minor League Div 2 2000: Camlin Rovers (Killoe + Clonbroney)
- Juvenile Championship 1980: Killoe Region (Killoe + Clonbroney + St. Colmcilles)
- Juvenile Championship 1983: Killoe Region (Killoe + Clonbroney + St. Colmcilles)

== Killoe Ladies ==
(Honours updated to end of 2025)

#	Competition	Titles	Years won
1	Leinster Club IFC	1	2008
2	Leinster Senior League	1	2013
3	Senior A Championship	8	2006, 2008, 2010, 2011, 2012, 2013, 2014, 2016
4	Senior B Championship	1	2017
5	Senior League	10	1980, 2004, 2008, 2010, 2011, 2012, 2013, 2015, 2016, 2017
6	Senior League 9-a-side	1	1999
7	Senior League Cup (Top 4)	3	2014, 2016, 2017
8	Senior Gold Cup	7	2013, 2014, 2015, 2016, 2017, 2018, 2023
9	Junior A Championship **	3	1995, 1996, 1998
10	Intermediate A Championship	3	2001, 2003, 2025
11	Minor A Championship	8	2001, 2002, 2003, 2004, 2005, 2006, 2007, 2008
12	Minor B Championship	1	2018
13	Juvenile A Championship	8	2001, 2003, 2004, 2005, 2006, 2007, 2022, 2023
14	U14 A Championship	6	1997, 2001, 2002, 2003, 2005, 2020
15	U14 League	3	2012, 2014, 2016
16	U13 A Championship	3	2000, 2003, 2004
17	U12 A Championship	2	1996, 2018, 2021
18	U12 League	1	2013

** Includes Senior B Championships in 1995 & 1996 which then became the Junior Championship

== Other honours ==
- GAA MacNamee Award - Best Website 2012
- Leinster GAA - Best Website 2014
- GAA Healthy Club 2018
- Texaco Support For Sport 2025
