= Abbeylara GFC =

Longford-based Gaelic games club

Abbeylara
- Mainistir Leathrátha
- Founded: 1928
- County: Longford
- Colours: White and Red
- Grounds: Oliver Lynch Park, Ballyboy, Abbeylara
- Coordinates: 53.75649°N 7.45771°W

Playing kits
Standard colours

Senior Club Championships
	All Ireland	Leinster champions	Longford champions
Football:	-	-	3

Abbeylara Gaelic Football Club is a Gaelic football club based in Abbeylara, County Longford, Ireland.

== History ==
Gaelic games in Abbeylara trace their origins back to the Ballywillan Michael Davitts club which was founded in 1889 and named after Michael Davitt. This club competed in the first Longford Senior Football Championship in 1890 and was sometimes referred to as Abbeylara Davitts. During the 1891 Senior Football Championship, Ballywillan Michael Davitts changed its name to Ballywillan Faugh a'Ballaghs. The club went into decline thereafter as all GAA competition ceased in Longford (and across much of the country) due to the Parnell saga.

The modern day Abbeylara club was first affiliated in 1928 and grew during the 1940s following the closure of the Ballywillan club. The club's crest depicts the ruins of the Abbey of Lerha from which Abbeylara gets its name.

A 'United Gaels' amalgamation, representing Granard and Abbeylara, reached the final of the Longford Senior Football Championship in 1947.

Abbeylara reached their first county final in 1998. Abbeylara have since won the Longford Senior Football Championship three times, in 2000, 2006, and 2024. They have been defeated in the Longford final in 2015, 2016, 2017 and 2018.

== Honours ==
- Longford Senior Football Championship (3): 2000, 2006, 2024
