= Shanid =

Barony in County Limerick, Ireland

Shanid Seanaid (Irish)
- Barony
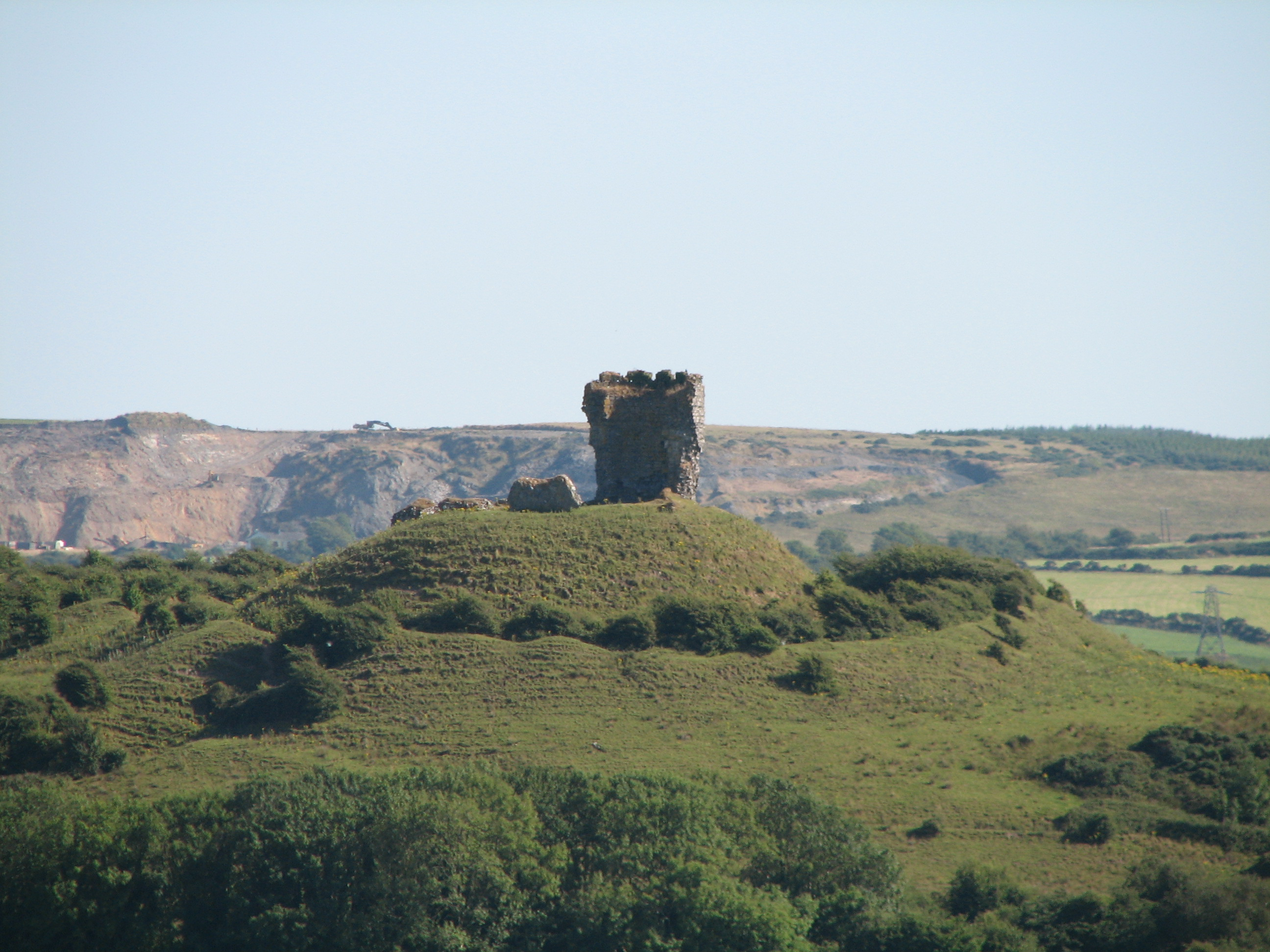
- Shanid Castle

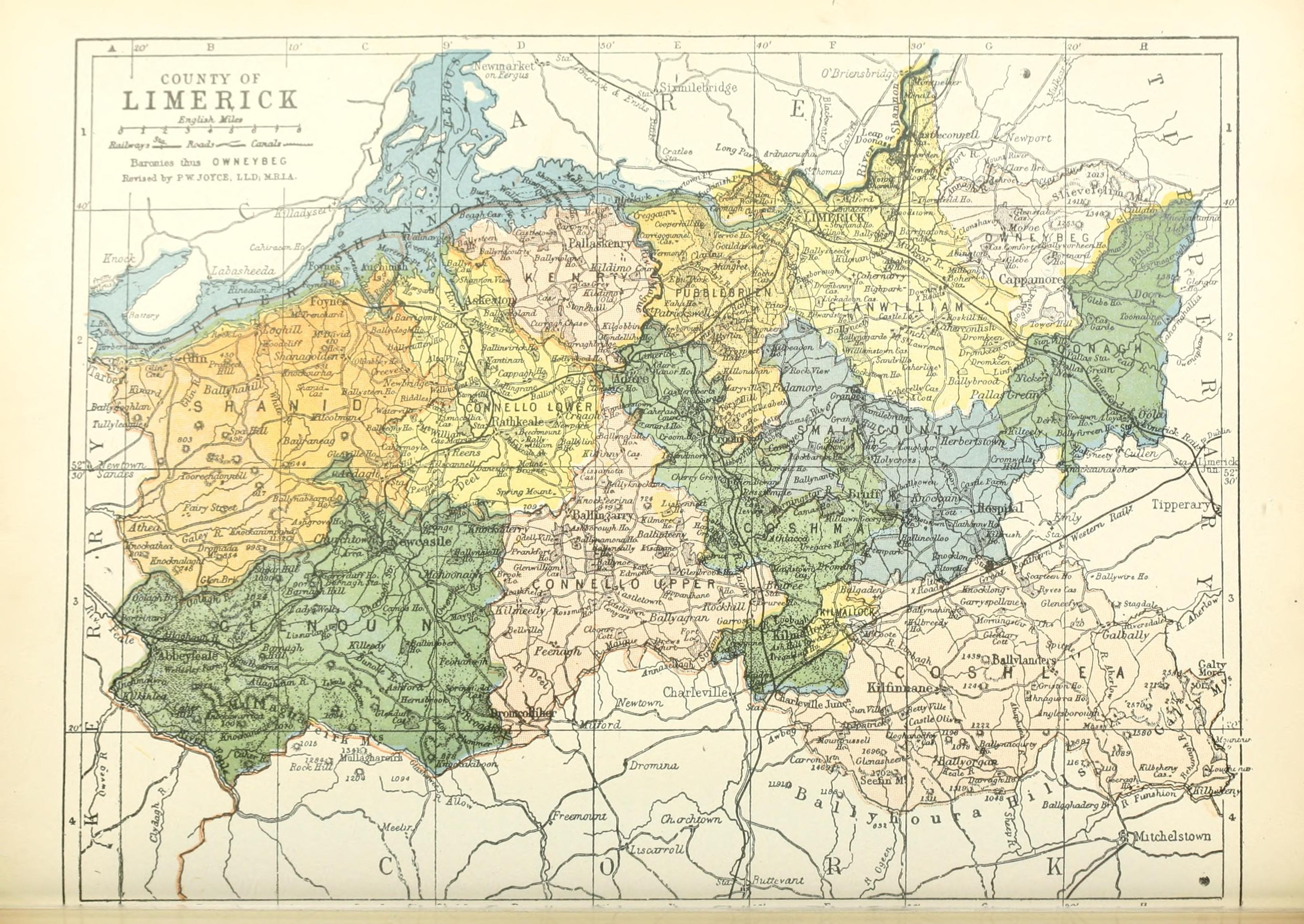
- Barony map of County Limerick, 1900; Shanid is in the northwest, coloured orange.

- Location within Ireland
- Coordinates: 52°31′N 9°09′W
- Sovereign state: Ireland
- Province: Munster
- County: Limerick

Area
  - Total: 340.2 km^{2} (131.4 sq mi)

Shanid (Irish: Seanaid) is a historical barony in northwest County Limerick, Ireland.

Baronies were mainly cadastral rather than administrative units. They acquired modest local taxation and spending functions in the 19th century before being superseded by the Local Government (Ireland) Act 1898.

== History ==
Shanid was anciently the seat of the Uí Chonaill Gabhra, part of the Uí Fidgenti. After the Norman conquest of Ireland, Shanid Castle and the surrounding area came to the Knights of Glin, who used the war-cry "Shanid Abú," 'Shanid forever'. Shanid barony was created in 1841, being broken off from Connello Lower. It was named for Shanid Castle; the placename is of unclear meaning, first recorded in Cogad Gáedel re Gallaib (early 12th century) as Senatibh.

The Shanid Historical Society was established in 2010.

== Geography ==
Shanid is in the northwest of the county, south of the Shannon Estuary and bordering County Kerry to the west.

== List of settlements ==
Settlements within the historical barony of Shanid include:

- Ardagh
- Athea
- Ballyhahill
- Carrigkerry
- Foynes
- Glin
- Shanagolden
