= Ardagh Fort =

Ringfort (rath) in County Limerick, Ireland

- Lios Ardach (Irish)
- Reerasta Rath, Ravenstar Fort, Ardagh Ringfort
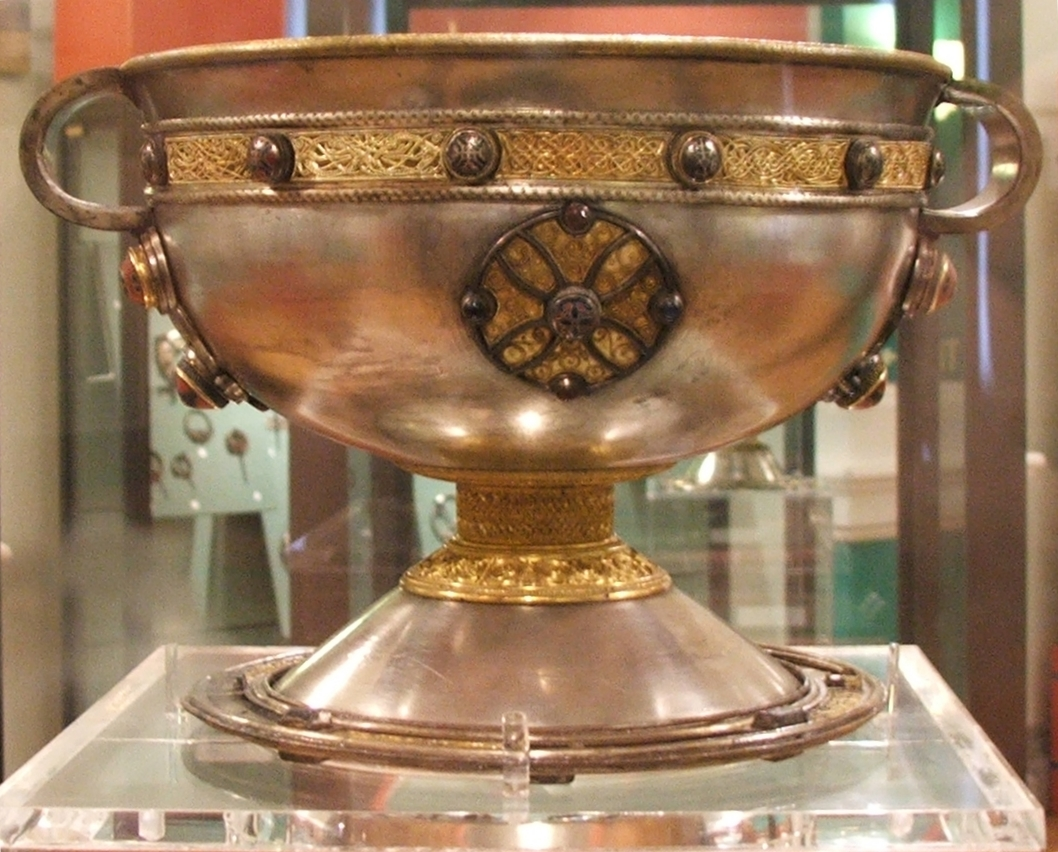
- The Ardagh Chalice, buried at Ardagh Fort c. 1740

- Location within Ireland
- 52.493580°N 9.068153°W
- Type: ringfort
- Periods: Bronze/Iron Age
- Cultures: Gaelic Ireland
- Location: Reerasta South, Ardagh, County Limerick, Ireland
- Region: Shannon Valley

History
- Built: 1000 BC

Site notes
- Material: earth
- Elevation: 103 m (338 ft)
- Diameter: 62 m (203 ft)
- Owner: State

National monument of Ireland
- Official name: Ardagh Ringfort
- Reference no.: 459

Ardagh Fort is a ringfort (rath) and National Monument in County Limerick, Ireland, famous as the discovery site of the Ardagh Hoard.

== Location ==
Ardagh Fort is located immediately west of the crossroads at Ardagh, atop a hill 103 m (338 ft) above sea level, overlooking the Daar River.

== History ==
The hillfort dates to the late Bronze Age or early Iron Age, c. 1000 BC.

In late September 1868 two local boys, Jimmy Quin and Paddy Flanagan, were digging potatoes at the southwest edge of the fort — farmers often avoided forts, believing them to be abodes of the Aos Sí (fairies), but they may have chosen the site in the belief that it would protect against potato blight. There, they discovered the Ardagh Hoard: a beautiful silver and gold chalice, a stemmed copper-alloy cup, and four brooches, all from the 8th or 9th centuries AD. There was also a wooden cross from the Penal era: it bore the inscription "727", presumably short for "1727", and the goods may have been concealed c. 1740. Catholic Mass is said to have been said at the rath in the penal era.

== Description ==
A rath with a high bank and deep ditch to the north and south; the east and west walls were never built. It covers 0.3 ha (3/4 acre).

== See also ==
- Ressad, lost city, probably in County Limerick, possibly associated with the rath
