= R521 road =

R521 road may refer to:

- R521 road (Ireland)
- R521 road (South Africa)
