= Ardagh Hoard =

Hoard of metalwork in Ireland

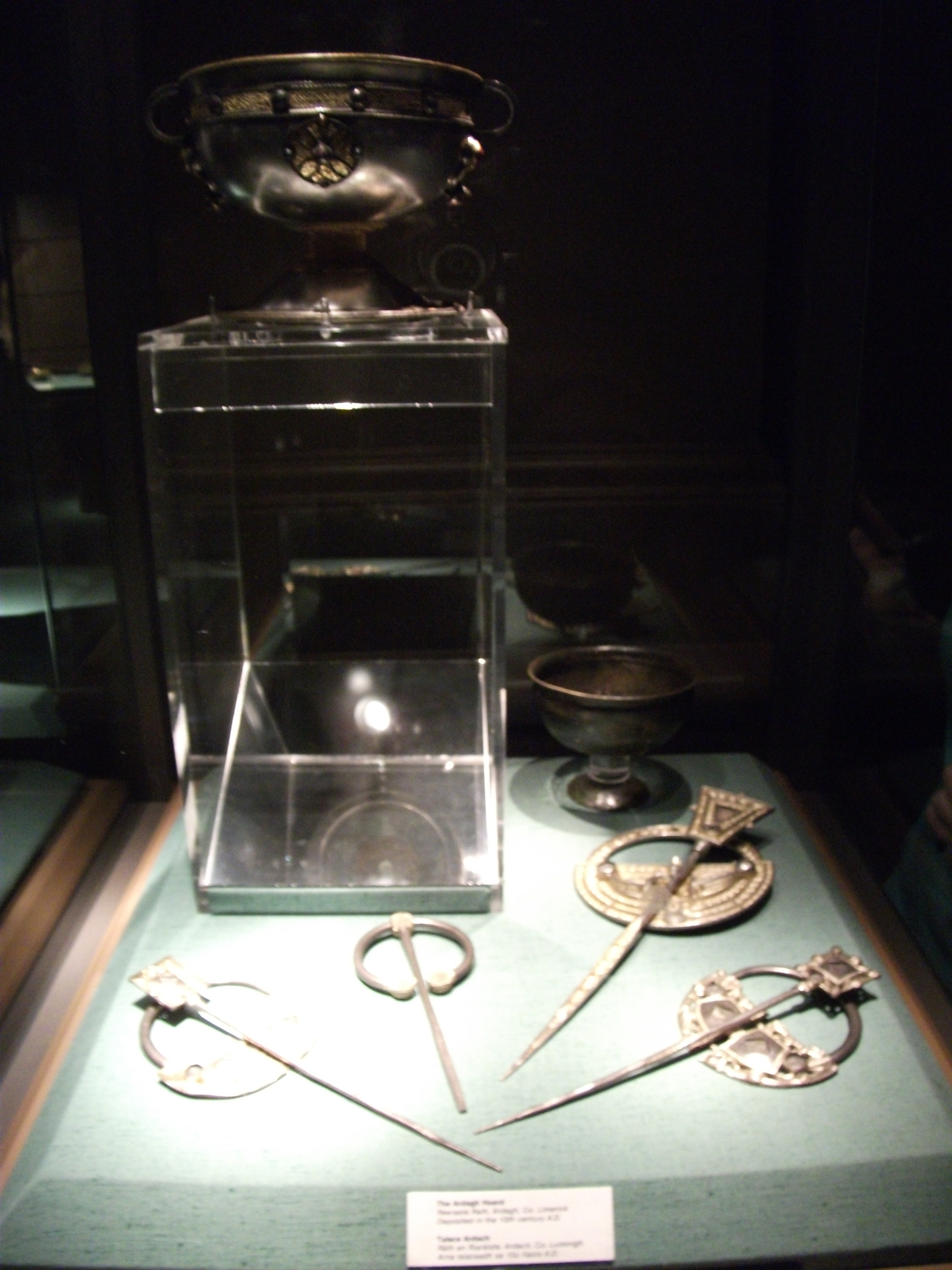
- The Ardagh Hoard on display in the National Museum of Ireland in Dublin, 2010
- Material: Copper-alloy
- Created: 8th century
- Discovered: 1868; Ardagh Fort, Ardagh, Ireland
- Present location: National Museum of Ireland, Dublin

The Ardagh Hoard, best known for the Ardagh Chalice, is a hoard of metalwork from the 8th and 9th centuries. Found in 1868 by two young local boys, Jim Quin and Paddy Flanagan, it is now on display in the National Museum of Ireland in Dublin. It consists of the chalice, a much plainer stemmed cup in copper-alloy, and four brooches – three elaborate pseudo-penannular ones, and one a true pennanular brooch of the thistle type; this is the latest object in the hoard, and suggests it may have been deposited around 900 AD.

The chalice ranks with the Book of Kells as one of the finest known works of metal Insular art, indeed of Celtic art in general, and is thought to have been made in the 8th century AD. Elaborate brooches, essentially the same as those worn by important laypeople, appear to have been worn by monastic clergy to fasten vestments of the period.

== Find ==
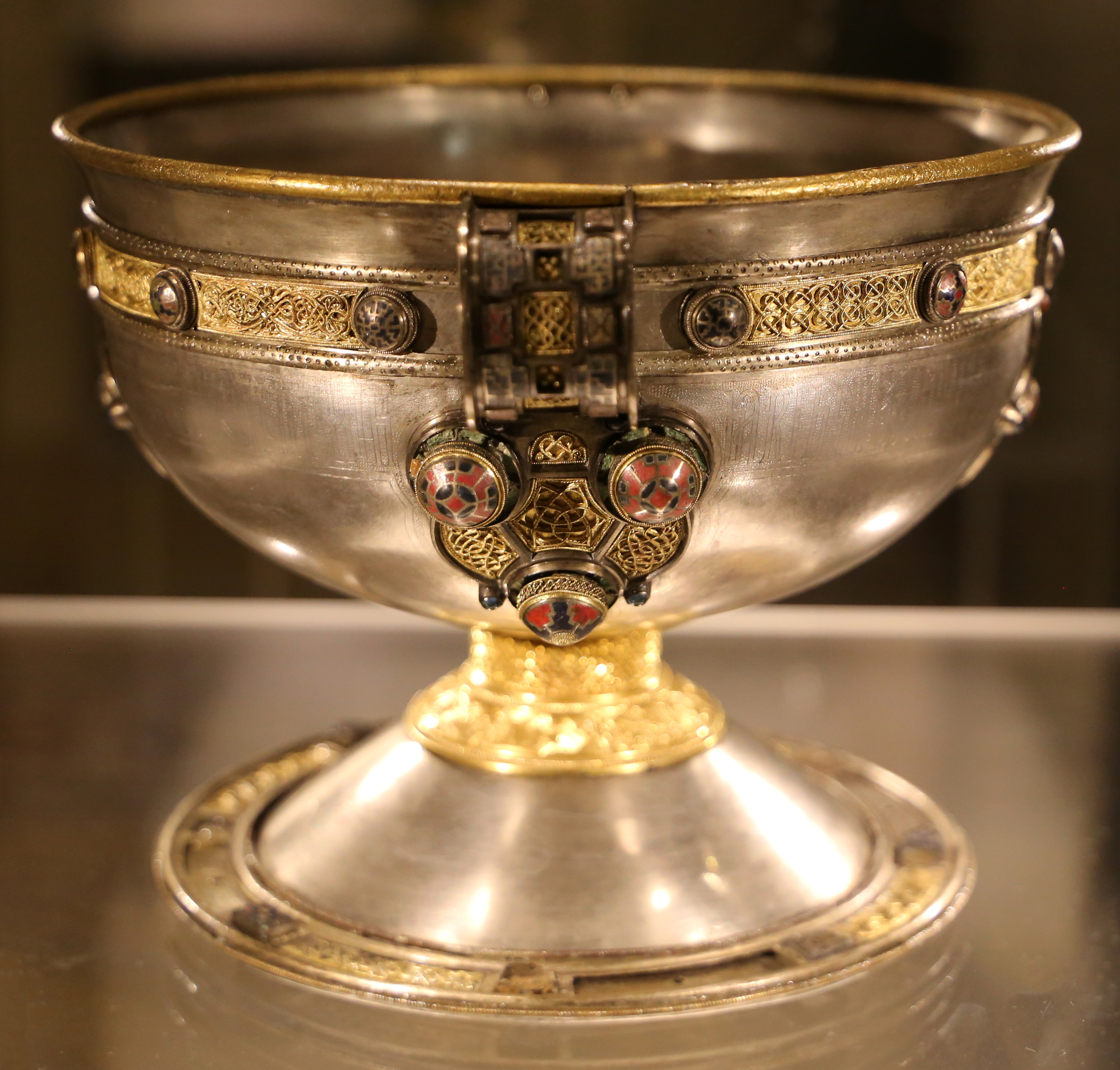
The Ardagh Chalice, centrepiece of the hoard

The hoard was found in late September 1868 by two boys, Jim Quin and Paddy Flanagan, digging in a potato field on the south-western side of a rath (ring fort) called Reerasta, beside the village of Ardagh, County Limerick, Ireland. Flanagan remained in Ireland and is buried in the Pauper's Graveyard in Newcastle West. Quin imigrated to Australia, spending his later years in Melbourne. He was buried in Fawkner Memorial Park in the city following his death there in 1934.

The chalice held the other items, covered merely by a slab of stone; the pieces must have been interred in a hurry, probably temporarily, as though the owner probably intended to return for them at a later time. The age of the brooches found with the chalice is evidence that it was not buried until the Viking period. It was sold to George Butler, Catholic Bishop of Limerick, by Quin's mother.

== Chalice ==
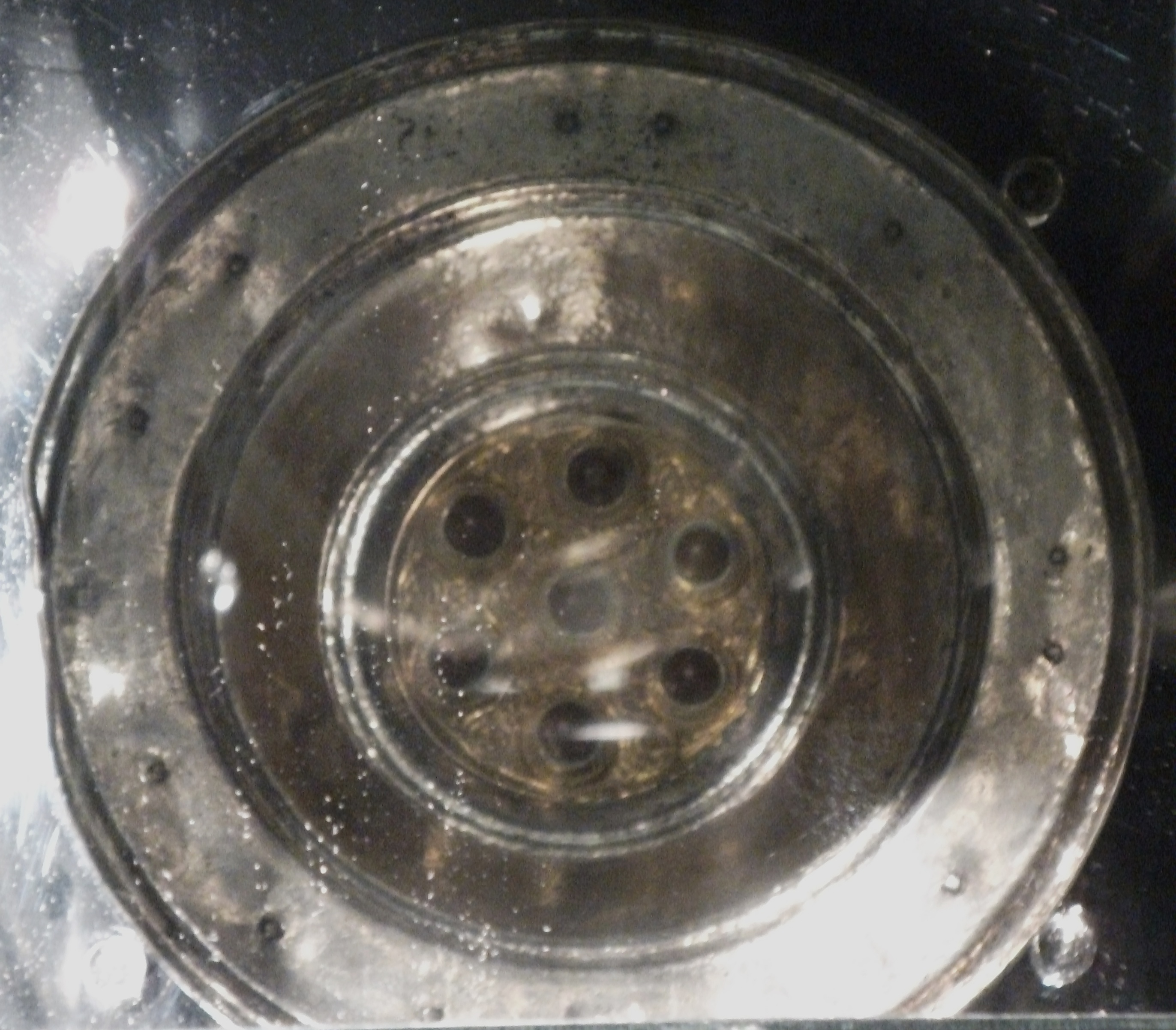
The chalice seen from below

The chalice is a large, two-handled beaten silver cup, decorated with gold, gilt bronze, brass, lead pewter and enamel, which has been assembled from 354 separate pieces; this complex construction is typical of early Christian Irish metalwork. The main body of the chalice is formed from two hemispheres of sheet silver joined with a rivet hidden by a gilt-bronze band and sits at 7 inches high. The width across its rim is 7.5 inches (190 mm). The names of the apostles are incised in a frieze around the bowl, below a girdle bearing inset gold wirework panels of animals, birds, and geometric interlace. Techniques used include hammering, engraving, lost-wax casting, filigree applique, cloisonné and enamel. Even the underside of the chalice is decorated (photo above).

According to the art historian Lawrence Stone (writing before the discovery of the Derrynaflan Hoard): "Here the Irish artist has shown a capacity for classical restraint by a deliberate decision to prevent the ornamentation from spreading so copiously as to blur the proportions... contrasting markedly with the lavish ornamental spread of the almost contemporary Tara Brooch and the still more elaborate systems of the later period. The bulk of the decoration consists of exquisitely drawn spiral or interlace patterns, given depth by the soldering of two layers of gold thread one on top of the other. At intervals are set cloisonné enamel bosses of blue and red, the complicated manufacture of which shows direct continuity with the Anglo-Saxon jewelers' craft of the preceding century. But apart from the extraordinary perfection of execution of this elaborate decoration, what gives to the Ardagh Chalice its outstanding position in Irish metalwork is the strictness of the relationship between the simple swelling lines of the cup and its base and the arrangement of the glittering studs, bands, and roundels that adorn its surface." The standard monograph is L.S. Gógan, The Ardagh Chalice.

The chalice is similar to the only other major early Irish example to survive, the Derrynaflan Chalice, found in the neighboring County Tipperary. That was found with a paten and liturgical strainer. At that time the ruling dynasty in Tipperary and most of Munster were the Eóganachta, while their allies and possible cousins the Uí Fidgenti ruled in the Limerick area (see Byrne 2001; Begley 1906). Although the early suggestion that the chalice was fabricated at Clonmacnoise and stolen from there by a Limerick Dane is widely circulated, this is unprovable. A Munster origin is just as likely if not more so given the 1980 discovery of the sister Derrynaflan Hoard. A Clonmacnoise origin is not mentioned at the National Museum of Ireland website.

The chalice was featured on a £1 value definitive postage stamp issued by An Post between 1990 and 1995 as part of the series Irish Heritage and Treasures designed by Michael Craig. Two Gaelic Athletic Association trophies are modelled on the Chalice: the O'Duffy Cup and the Sam Maguire Cup.
