= Monasternagalliaghduff =

Ruined abbey in County Limerick, Ireland

Coordinates: 52.5713°N 9.0630°W

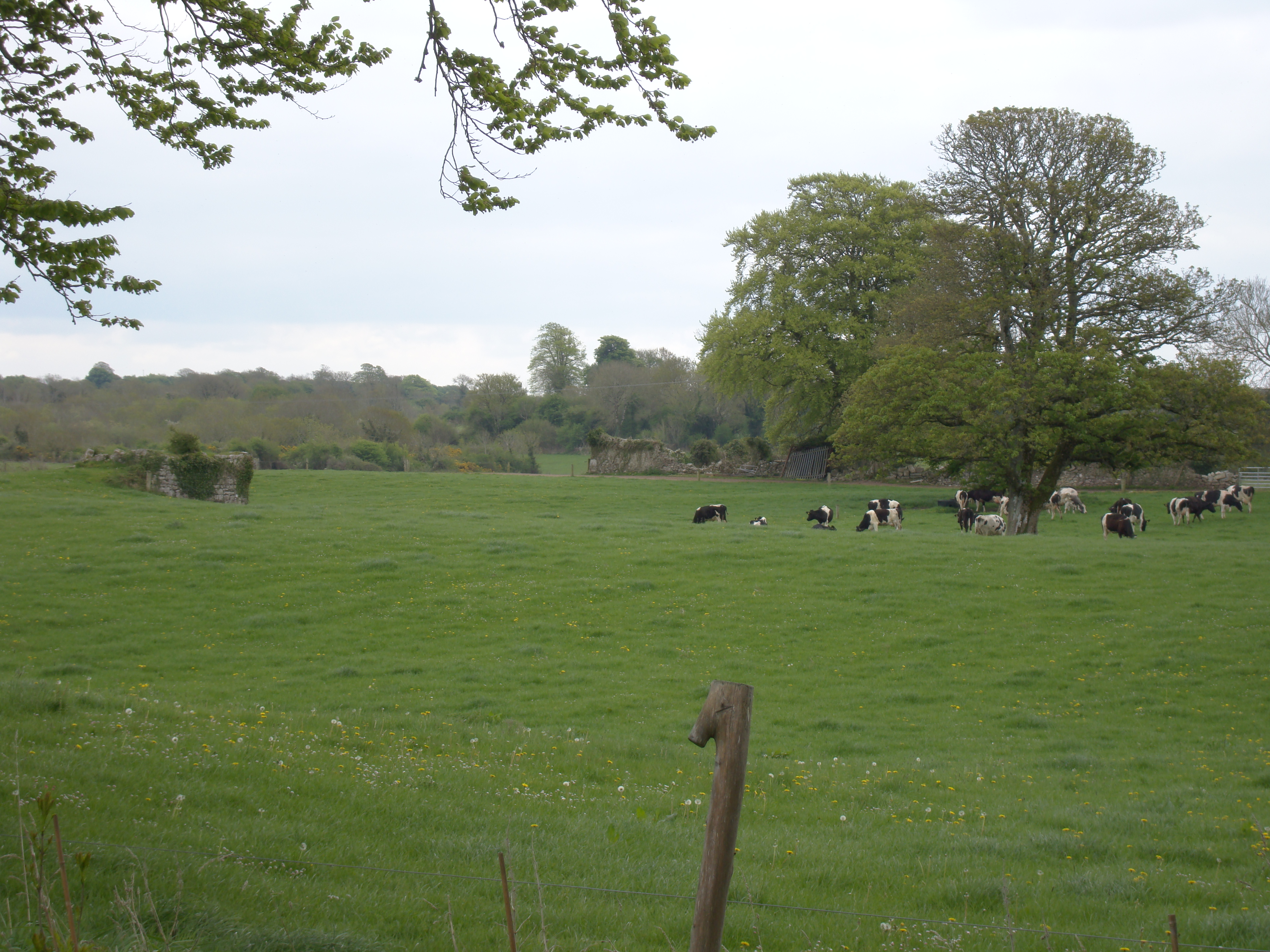
Remains of St Katherine's Abbey

Monasternagalliaghduff (Irish: Mainistir na gCailleach Dubh, meaning 'The Black Nuns' Abbey') also called the Abbey of St Catherine de O'Conyl or simply Old Abbey, is a ruined Augustinian abbey in County Limerick in Ireland.

== Location ==
The abbey lies in a small valley about two miles east of the village of Shanagolden, in the townland of Oldabbey (named after it), which is in the civil parish of Robertstown and barony of Shanid (formerly part of the barony of Connello or O'Conyl).

== History ==
One of the earliest recorded nunneries in Ireland, it is first mentioned in 1298, and was founded on land donated by John FitzThomas of Connello (who died in 1261). While there are few details, it appears in court and land records over the succeeding centuries, and at Dissolution of the Monasteries during the Reformation in Ireland, in 1541, a valuation is given. Further records of leases, conveyances and other land transactions are found for its ruins and lands.

== Architecture ==
Remains include the abbey church to the east of the cloister, with two small spaces adjacent - one of which is now known as the Black Hag's Cell but which appears to have been a sacristy - a refectory to the south, and a vaulted building to the west. From the refectory a later building projects south towards a stream; it may have been a kitchen. There are also walls and a gate, and traces of an orchard, a fish pond and a pigeon house. The church and cloister walls were assessed as being of similar age, and their windows dated to the 13th century. Modifications to the church in the 15th century saw the inclusion of an east window in the church as well as a doorway in the north. Traces of window decoration, columns, a piscina and a carved tombstone remain.

Burials were also located, and the church plate was reportedly found in the late eighteenth century.

== Folklore ==
Some legends relating to the abbey include:

- Prior to the dissolution it was said that the nunnery had been dissolved by the Pope as the last abbess practised witchcraft in a room to the south of the church which is now called 'The Black Hag's Cell'. This legend was probably propaganda in furtherance of the dissolution. Wardell suggests the legend might have arisen if a nun remained after the dissolution, and that later people may have misunderstood cailleach dhubh (archaic for "nun") as "black hag".
- During a feud between the Earl of Desmond and the Butlers, the Desmonds were fleeing the nunnery when the Countess was wounded by an arrow. The Earl, believing her dead, hastily interred her under the church altar; but she had been buried alive, and her screams are said to echo through the ruins to this day.

== See also ==
- List of monastic houses in County Limerick
