= R523 road (Ireland) =

Road in southwestern Ireland

Coordinates: 52.461499°N 9.277646°W

R523 road
- Bóthar R523
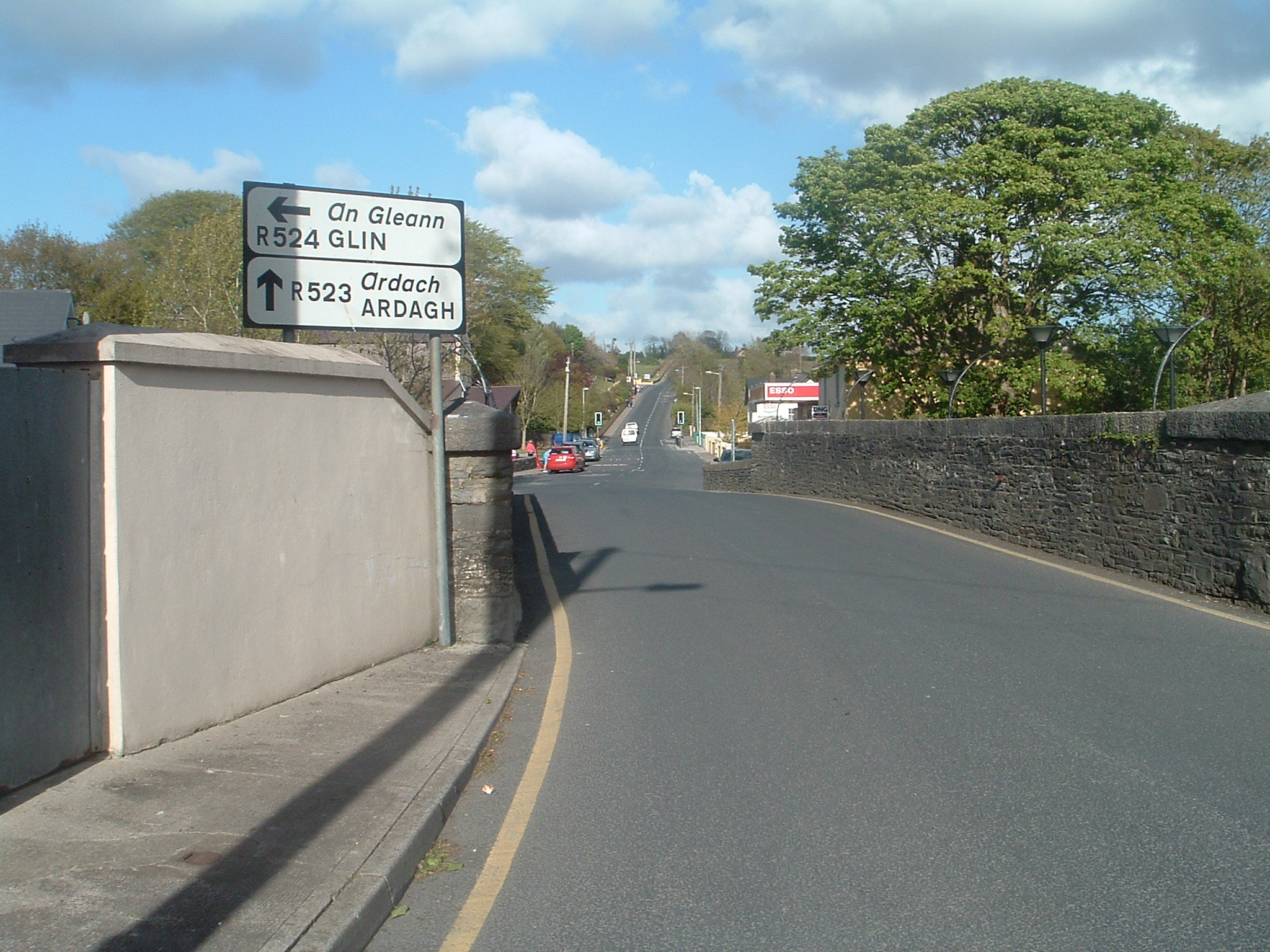
- The R523 crossing the River Gale in Athea.

Route information
- Length: 40.3 km (25.0 mi)

Major junctions
- From: N69 Bolton's Cross (east of Listowel)
- Enters County Limerick; R524 Athea; Passes through Carrigkerry and crosses River Daar; R521 Ardagh
- To: N21 Reens (west of Rathkeale)

Location
- Country: Ireland

Highway system
- Roads in Ireland; Motorways; Primary; Secondary; Regional

The R523 road is a regional road in Ireland, located in County Kerry and County Limerick.
