= Shanagolden, County Limerick =

Village in County Limerick, Ireland

Shanagolden Irish: Seanghualainn
- Village
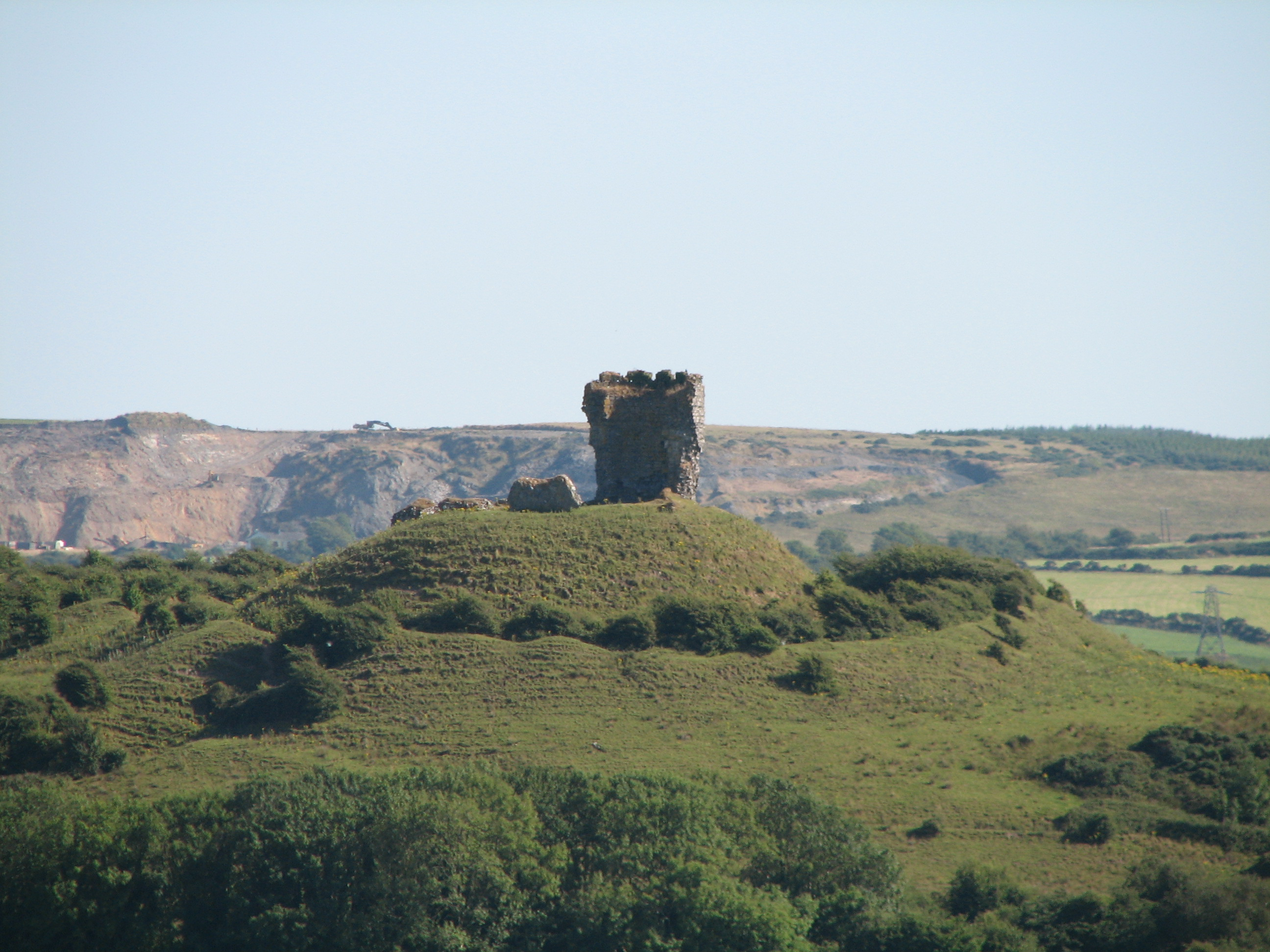
- Shanid Castle just south of Shanagolden

- Location in Ireland
- Coordinates: 52.573°N 9.100°W
- Country: Ireland
- Province: Munster
- County: County Limerick
- Elevation: 25 m (82 ft)

Population (2016)
  - Total: 303
- Irish Grid Reference: R252477

Shanagolden (Irish: Seanghualainn, meaning 'the old shoulder') is a small village in County Limerick, Ireland. It is west of the Golden Vale, an area of fertile agricultural land in the province of Munster. The village is around 35 km west of Limerick city on the R521 road between Foynes and Newcastle West. The population was 303 at the 2016 census. The village is in a townland and civil parish of the same name.

== History ==
The area is mentioned in the Annals of the Four Masters. In 968 the King of Munster, Mathgamain mac Cennétig, defeated the Hiberno-Norse Kings Ivar of Limerick and Ivar of Waterford at Sengualainn in a "red slaughter". In 1124, Turlogh O'Connor gathered a fleet together to cross the River Shannon and plundered the lands of the Uí Conaill at Foynes Island. After the defeat of the Rebel Earl during the Second Desmond Rebellion, Shanagolden village was laid out during the 1580s as an Anglo-Irish plantation village.

== Places of interest ==
The ruins of Shanid Castle, an important Anglo-Norman stronghold, are located a short distance away from the village. The castle was possibly constructed in 1230 on land associated with the FitzMaurice family which settled in the area after 1169 and was a fortress of the Knights of Glin before being burned in 1641. Known as the "Old Abbey", St. Katherine's Abbey, Monisternagalliaghduff (Manisternagalliaghduff) is a former Augustinian nunnery founded in 1298 and dissolved in 1541. One of the earliest recorded nunneries in Ireland, it is located in a valley about 2 miles north east of Shanagolden. The town's history has been chronicled in a local book, written by students of the local primary school, and was published and distributed to many local shops.

== In Media ==
Sean McCarthy -- a native of Finuge, County Kerry -- wrote a popular ballad entitled "Shanagolden" which has been covered by many groups and singers, including Dervish, Peggy Sweeney, Seán Ó Sé and many more.

== See also ==
- List of towns and villages in Ireland
