= John St. John Long =

Irish quack and painter (1798–1834)

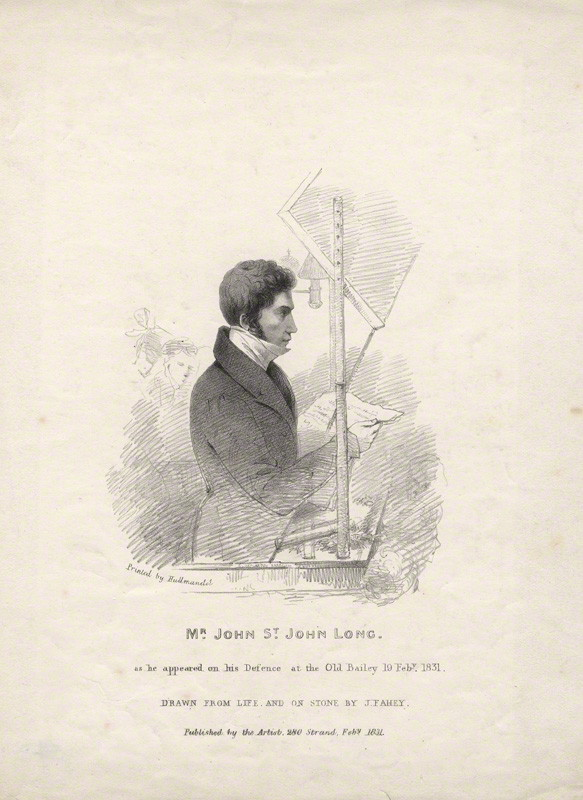
- John St. John Long on trial
- Born: 1798; Newcastle West
- Died: 1834 (aged 35–36)
- Resting place: Kensal Green Cemetery

John St. John Long (1798–July 2, 1834) was an Irish–born quack doctor who claimed to be able to cure tuberculosis. In two instances, he was tried for manslaughter of his patients. In the first case, he was found guilty and fined £250, and in the second case acquitted. He died at the age of 35, reportedly from tuberculosis, but perhaps merely from a horse-riding accident.

== Life ==
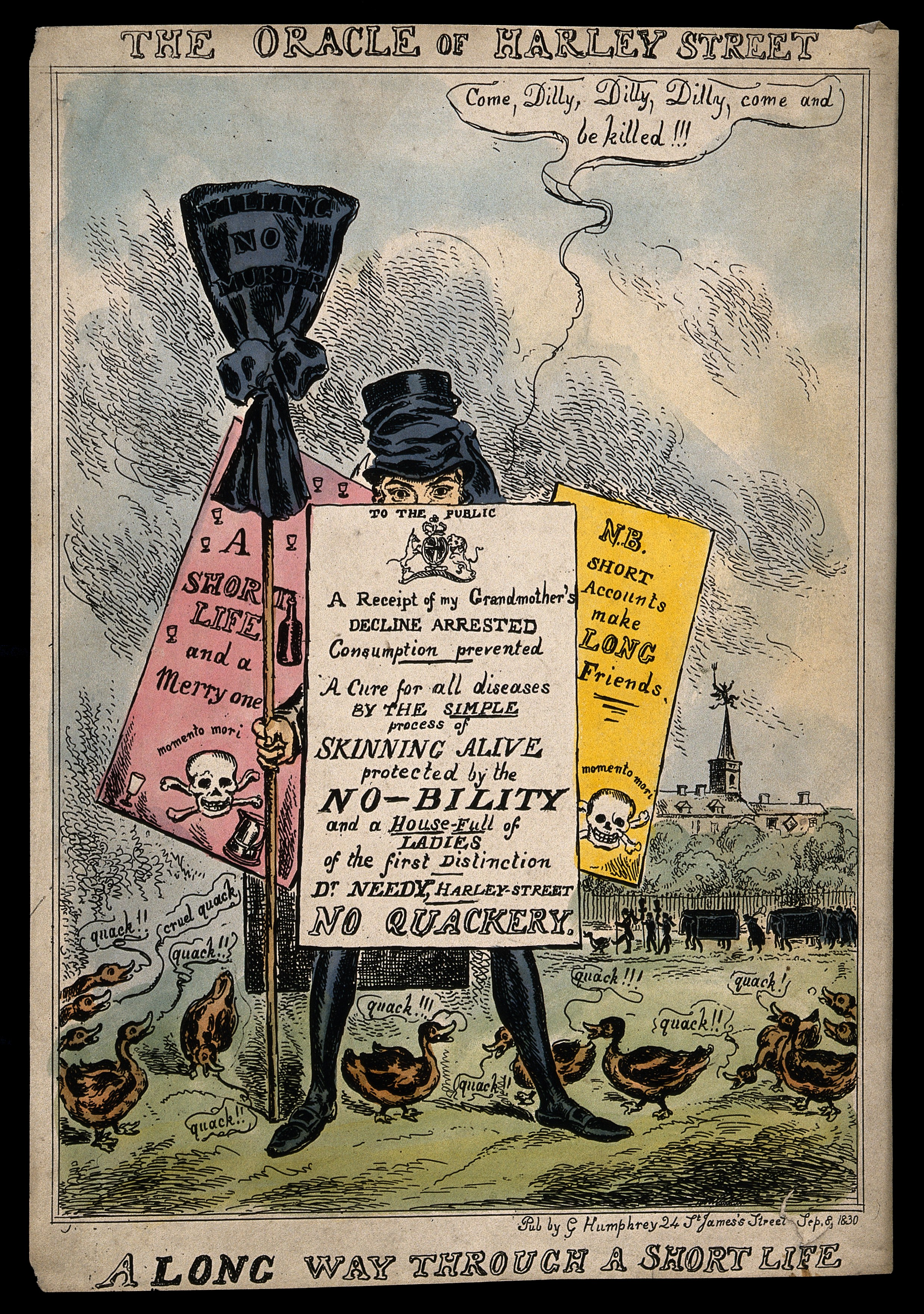
Coloured etching by Sharpshooter, 8 September 1830, lampooning Long

Long, born in Newcastle West in 1798, was the second son of John Long, basket-maker and jack-of-all-trades, by Anne St. John. He showed some gift for drawing, and in 1816 some local people contributed money for him to attend the Royal Dublin Society's school of design. He returned to Limerick two years later. In 1821, he titled himself "Historical & Portrait Painter" and opened a drawing academy at 36 George Street (O'Connell Street). In 1822, he came to London, and in 1827 began his quack medical practice, which was so successful that he was shortly able to move to Harley Street.

Long's treatments for tuberculosis both involved secret formulas, one inhaled, the other rubbed on the back or chest. The rubbing treatment was conducted daily for five to ten days until the patients developed a running sore, which Long said allowed the disease to leave the body.

== Trials ==
In 1830, Long was tried for the death of his patient Catherine Cashin, age 24. Cashin's mother had visited Long to consult about her younger daughter Ellen, who was sixteen and had tuberculosis. Ellen was deemed to be beyond treatment but, preying on the mother's fears, Long convinced her to obtain preventative treatment for Ellen's older sister, Catherine, who appeared to be in perfect health. The wound he caused her became severely infected, and Catherine began constantly vomiting. Long prescribed mulled wine, which Catherine was unable to keep down. A Doctor Brodie was called in, over Long's objections, but Catherine died the following day.

Long was tried at the Old Bailey. He argued he was not responsible and that the death was caused by Dr. Brodie's intervention and produced favorable testimony from his other patients. Nevertheless, he was found guilty of manslaughter on 23 October 1830, but was sentenced only to a fine of £250, which he paid immediately.

The following month Long was indicted for the manslaughter of Mrs. Colin Campbell Loyd, but was acquitted on 19 February 1831.

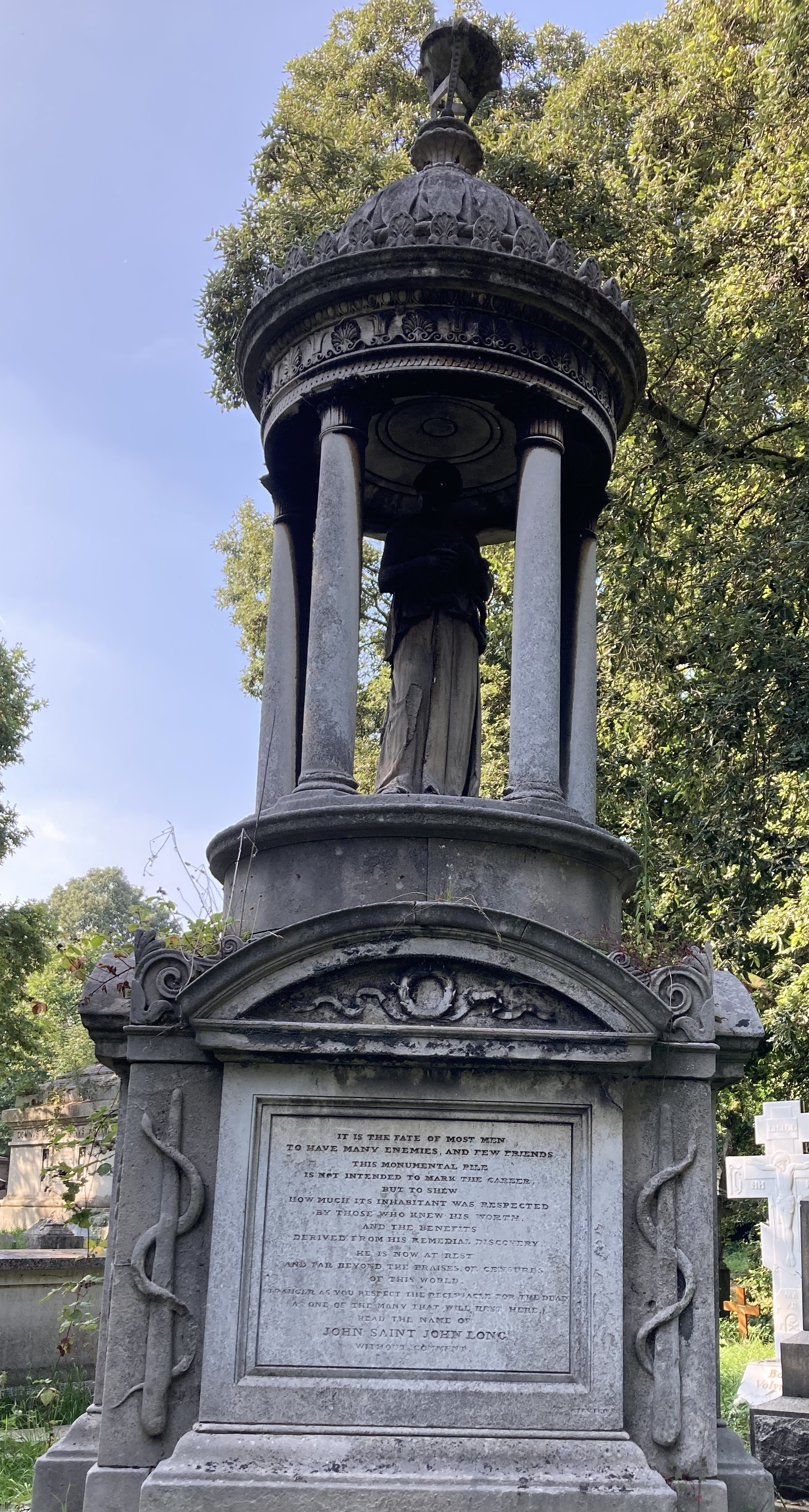
Memorial to John St. John Long in Kensal Green Cemetery

== Death ==
Long is said to have died of tuberculosis himself, and refused treatment by his own method, on 2 July 1834. Some of his former patients contributed to erect a monument to him at his tomb in Kensal Green Cemetery, with a complimentary inscription. He left his property, including his secret remedy (which he valued at £10,000) to his brother William.

== Publications ==
- Discoveries in the Science and Art of Healing, London, 1830; 2nd edition 1831.
- A Critical Exposure of the Ignorance and Malpractice of certain Medical Practitioners in their Theory and Treatment of Disease, London, 1831.
