= Weymouth Street Hospital =

English private hospital

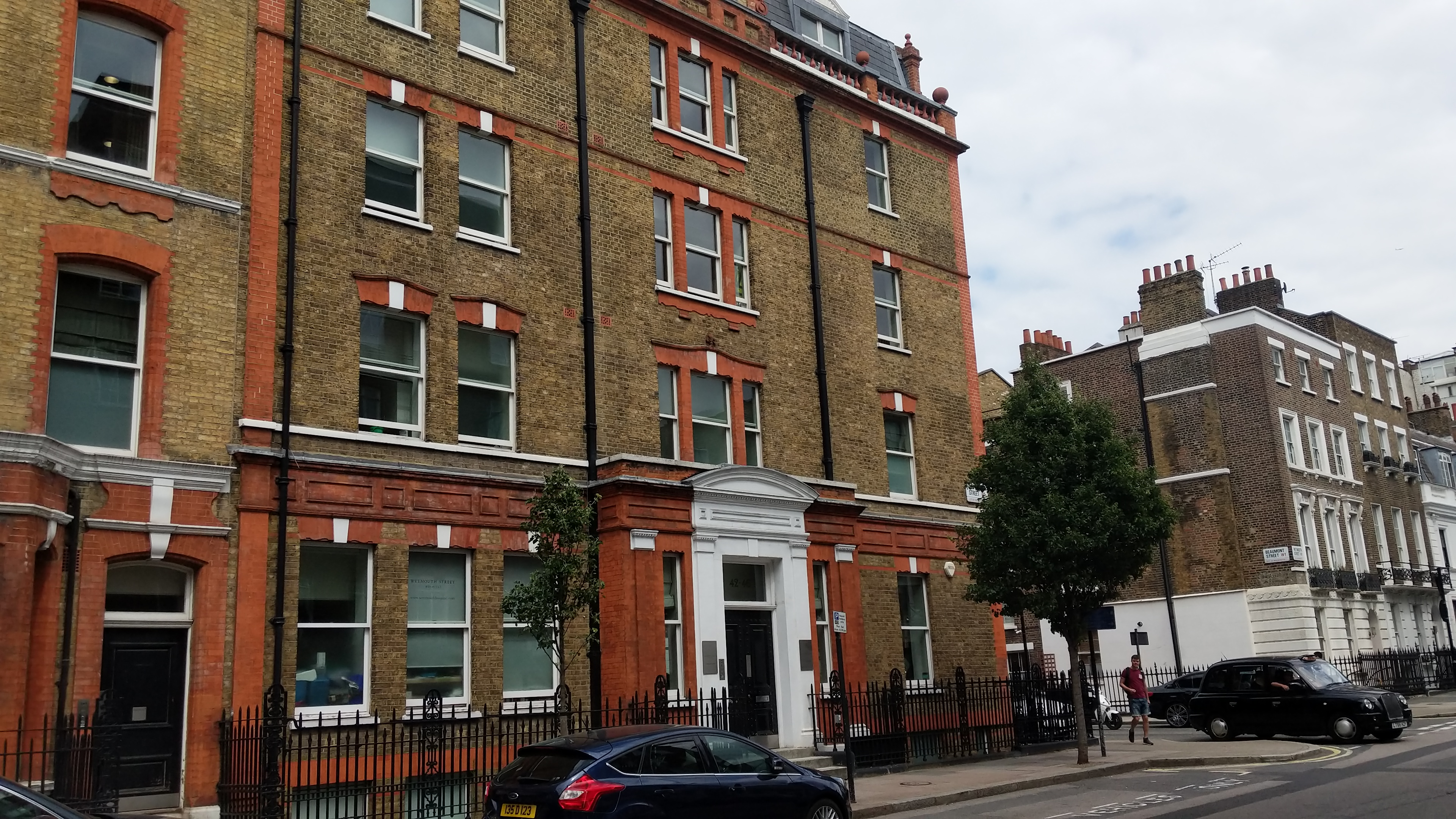
- Weymouth Street Hospital

- Location in Westminster

Geography
- Location: London, United Kingdom
- Coordinates: 51.5202°N 0.1506°W

Organisation
- Care system: Private

History
- Founded: 2018; 8 years ago

Links
- Website: www.phoenixhospitalgroup.com/our-locations/weymouth-street-hospital/

Weymouth Street Hospital is a private hospital in London, England. Along with its consulting rooms at 9 Harley Street, it is owned by Phoenix Hospital Group, which bought 25 Harley Street in January 2018.

== History ==
The hospital was founded by Dr Aubrey Bristow and Mr Ghassan Alusi, two consultants from St Bartholomew's Hospital, London and opened after a complete rebuild in 2010. The hospital was featured in a television programme called Transformation Street in January 2018 which featured patients having transgender surgery.
