= Harley Street =

Street in Marylebone, London

Coordinates: 51.5206°N 0.1477°W

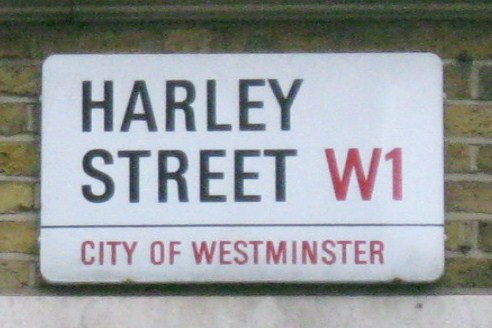
Harley Street sign

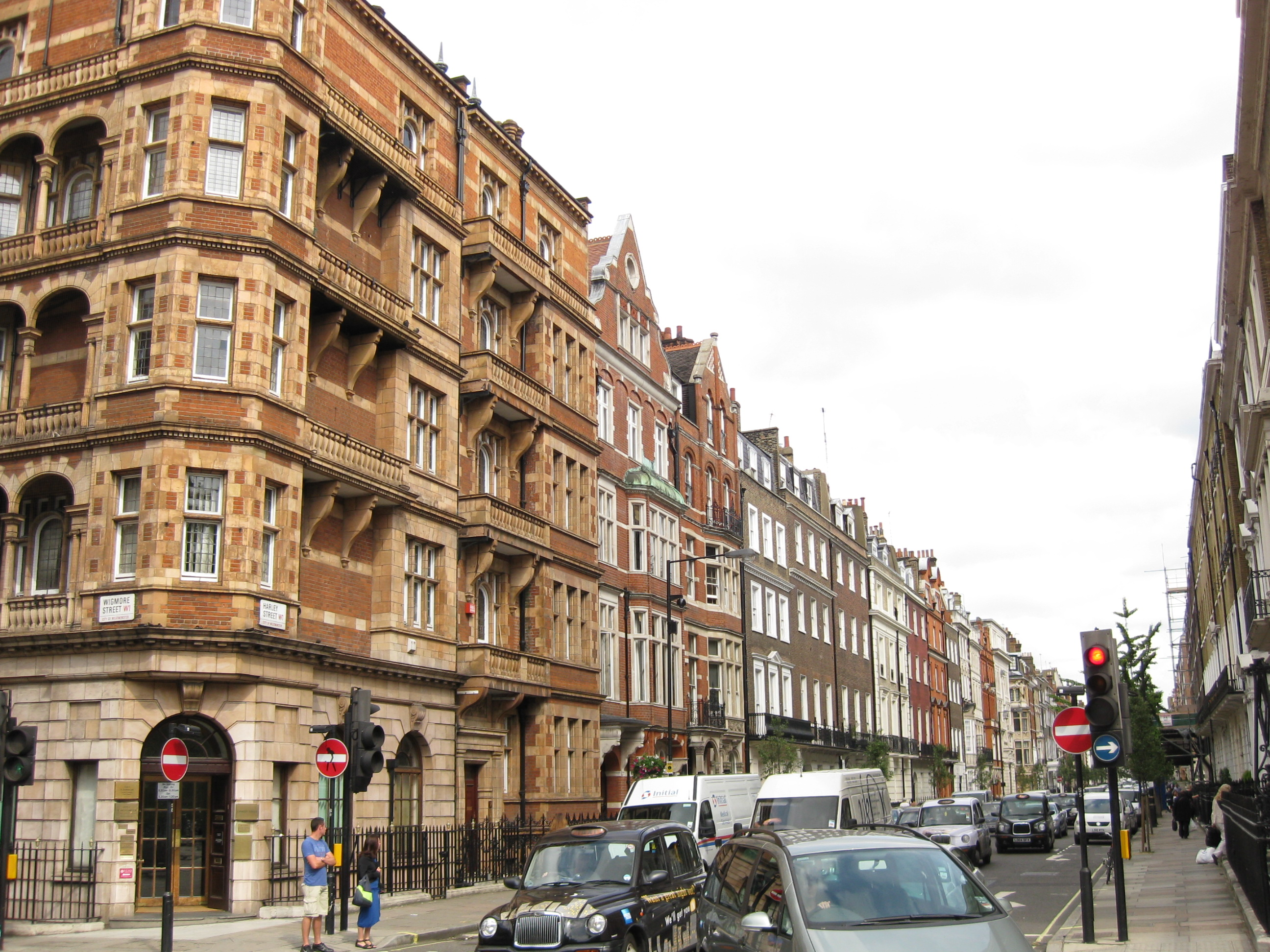
Harley Street from junction with Wigmore Street

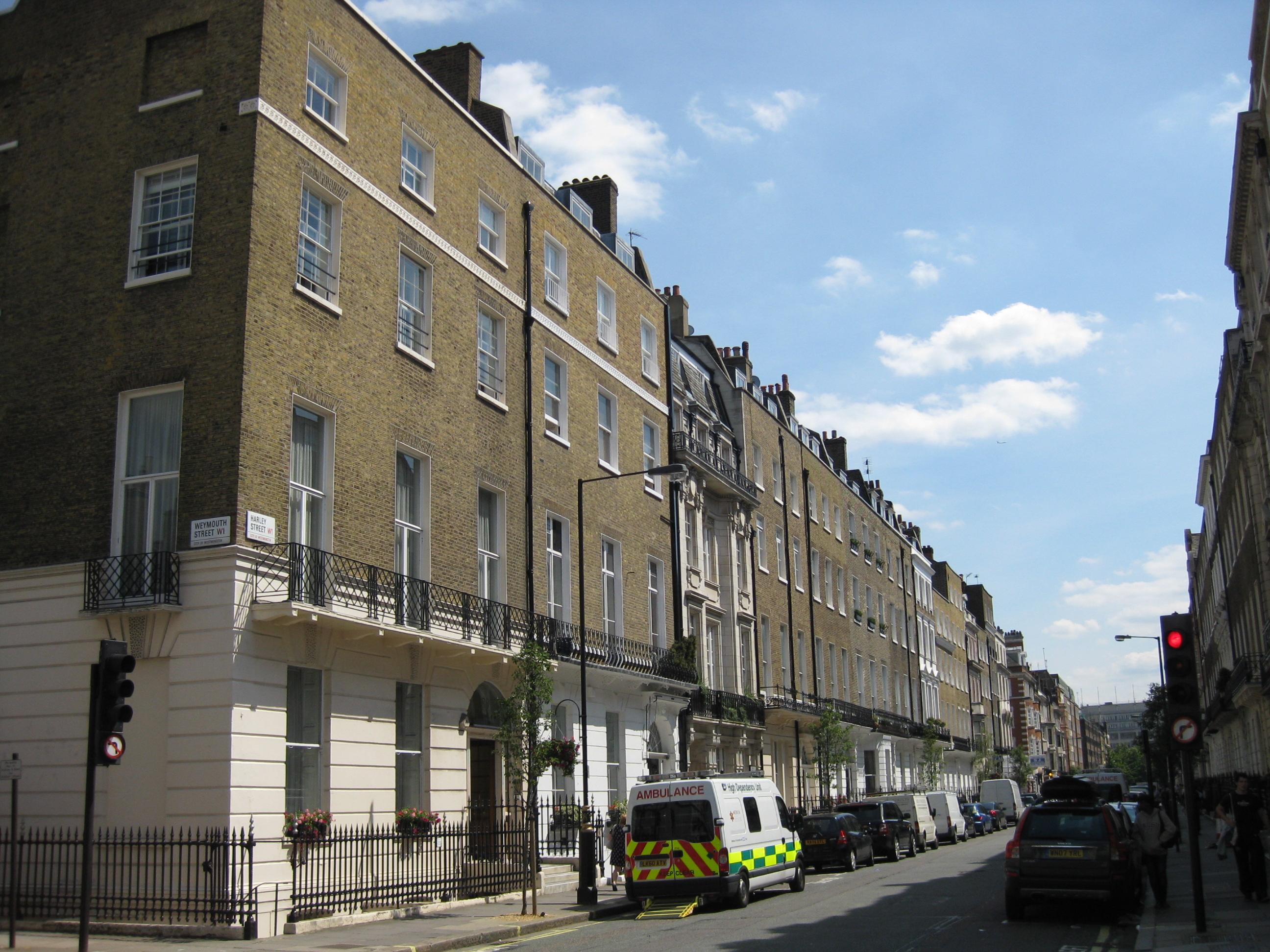
Harley Street 2011

Harley Street is a street in Marylebone, Central London, named after Edward Harley, 2nd Earl of Oxford and Earl Mortimer and part of the Howard de Walden Estate. The nearest London Underground stations are Regent's Park, Great Portland Street and Oxford Circus. It is known for having a high concentration of doctors and medical practitioners.

== History ==
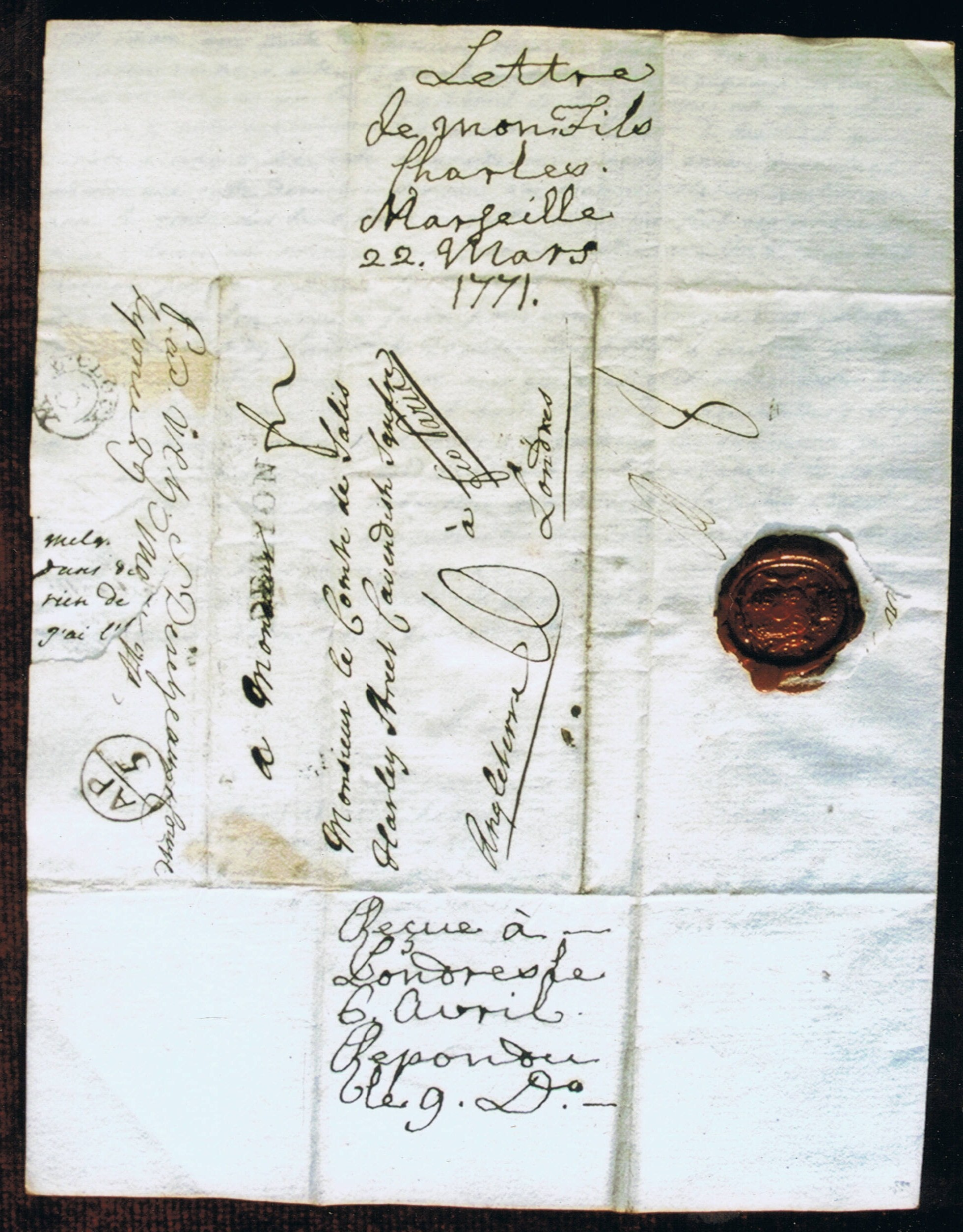
Letter to an early Harley Street resident, 1771

Harley Street was already known as a wealthy locale by the time of Jane Austen's Sense and Sensibility (1813), in which she has the Dashwood sisters, Lucy Steele, Mrs Jennings, Edward Ferrars, and others spend some of their free time there while in London. It remained so later that century – in Elizabeth Gaskell's North and South (1854–55), Margaret Hale lived with her aunt Mrs. Shaw and cousin Edith in a house on Harley Street for nine years, before she moved with her parents to the fictional northern town of Milton, whilst in Henry James' The Turn of the Screw (1898), the wealthy uncle at the beginning of the work apparently has a house on Harley Street.

=== Notable occupants ===
Many famous people have lived on Harley Street, including the Victorian Prime Minister William Ewart Gladstone, and the artist J. M. W. Turner. Queen's College, founded in 1848 and one of the oldest girls' schools in England, is situated on Harley Street.

- Sir William Beechey (portrait painter) lived at No.13.
- George Frederick Bodley (architect) lived from 1862 to 1873 at No. 109, which is now commemorated by a blue plaque.
- Mary Everest Boole, self-taught mathematician, and widow of George Boole, lived at No.68 in 1865 following the death of her husband.
- Wilkie Collins, author of The Woman in White and The Moonstone, lived at No. 12 (later renumbered No. 26) with Caroline Graves from 1860 to 1864.
- Harriet Harman MP KC, Labour politician, born at 108 Harley Street.
- William Henry Giles Kingston, Victorian author of boys' adventure novels, was born on Harley Street, 28 February 1814.
- Sir Charles Lyell (lawyer, author and geologist). Lived at No.11 (which is now No.73).
- Stafford Northcote, 1st Earl of Iddesleigh (British politician, Conservative Chancellor of the Exchequer) lived at No.86.
- Allan Ramsay (portrait painter) lived at No.67.
- J. M. W. Turner (landscape painter) lived at No.64 from 1799 to 1805.
- Sir Arthur Wellesley, the future Duke of Wellington, had his first London residence in Harley Street.
- Isabel Thorne member of the Edinburgh Seven lived at 148, Harley Street, London.

== Medical history ==
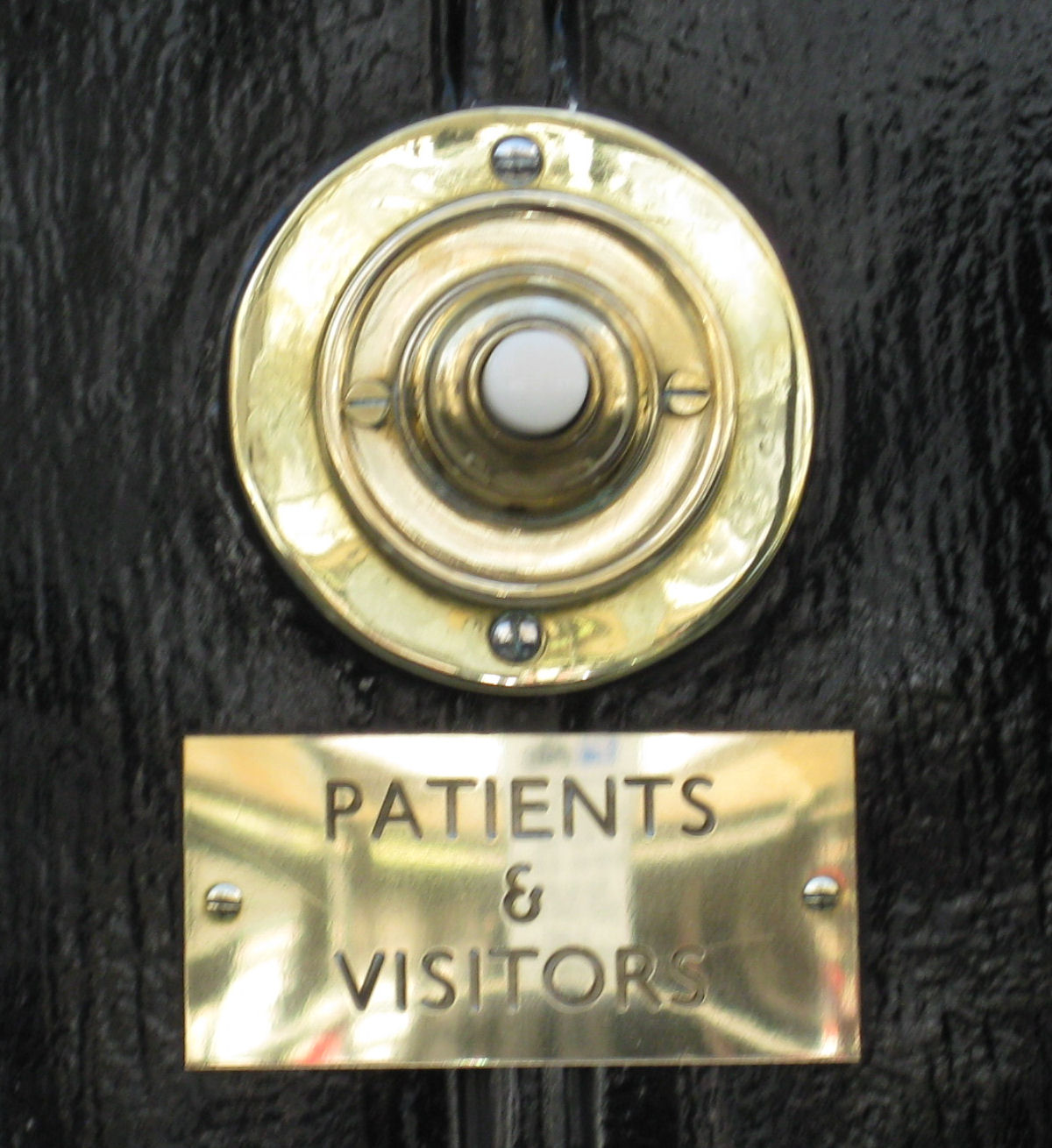
One of doorbells at consulting rooms

Since the 19th century it has housed private specialists in medicine and surgery. This also drew it into London's criminal history in the form of the "Harley Street mystery", in which on 3 June 1880 the body of a 4ft 10 woman in her thirties was found in the basement of number 139 (then occupied by a merchant) in a barrel of chloride of lime - an inquest called Professor Augustus Pepper and Dr Frederick William Spurgin but she was never identified.

Since the 19th century the number of doctors, hospitals, and medical organisations in and around Harley Street has increased. Records show that there were around 20 doctors in 1860, 80 by 1900, and almost 200 by 1914. When the National Health Service was established in 1948, there were around 1,500. There are more than 3,000 people employed in the Harley Street area now, in clinics, medical and paramedical practices, and hospitals.

== Notable practitioners ==
Those who have practised there include:

- Sir Grantly Dick-Read (Obstetrician) lived and had his practice at No.25. Green Plaque.
- Sir Stewart Duke-Elder (Ophthalmologist) lived & worked at No.63. Blue Plaque.
- Sir James Galloway (1862–1922), dermatologist, practised at No. 54.
- John Langdon Down moved in 1881 with his medical practice from 47 Welbeck Street to 81 Harley Street.
- Lionel Logue (speech therapist), from Australia, had his practice at No.146. He helped King George VI overcome his stammer with lessons here. There is a Green Plaque.
- Sir Harold Ridley (Pioneering Ophthalmologist). Lived at No.53.
- John St. John Long, a quack, practised in Harley Street from 1827 to 1834.
- Sir Morell Mackenzie, the 'Father of British Laryngology' lived in 19, Harley Street till his death. Involved in the great controversy while treating the German Crown Prince Fredrick III, the Son-in-law of Her Majesty Queen Victoria for his laryngeal disease, allegedly cancer of the left vocal cord which led to the demise of the Emperor in 1888.
- Charles Wilson, 1st Baron Moran, who was Winston Churchill's personal physician, had a private practice at No. 29 during the 1920s and 1930s.
- Mary Scharlieb, Dame and pioneer woman doctor had a medical practice and lived at 149 Harley Street, London.
- Zack Polanski, Leader of the Green Party of England and Wales, had a hypnotherapy clinic on Harley Street, which became the centre of controversy in 2013.

== See also ==
- List of eponymous roads in London
- Macquarie Street, Sydney
- Rodney Street, the Harley Street of the North, in Liverpool
- Welbeck Street
- Wimpole Street
- Weymouth Street Hospital
