= Ardagh, County Limerick =

Village in County Limerick, Ireland

Ardagh Ardach
- Village
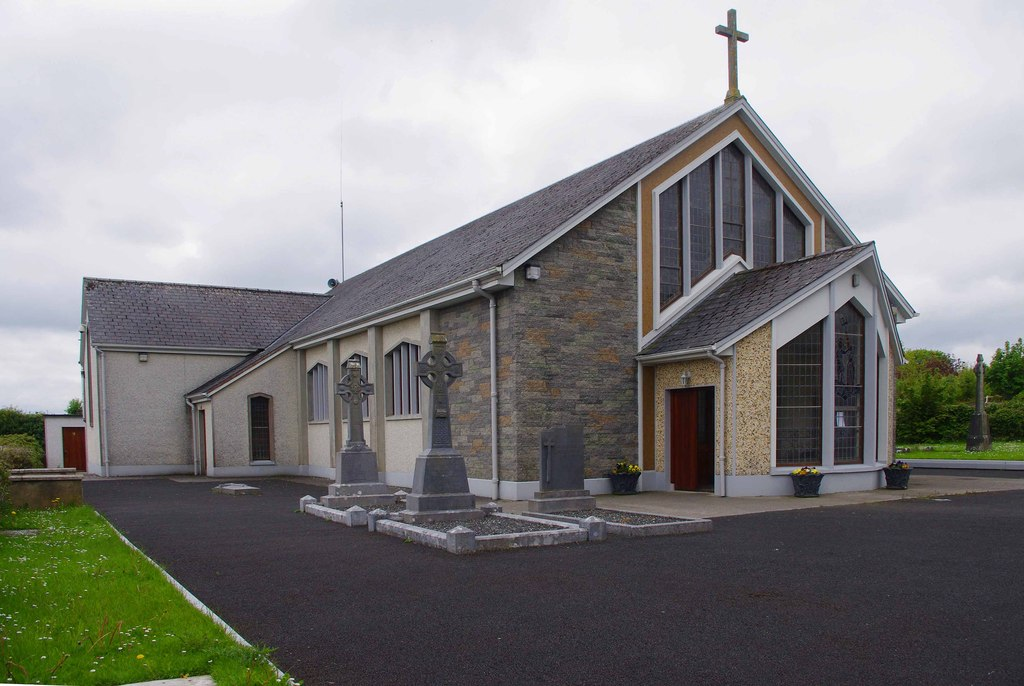
- St. Molua's Roman Catholic church in Ardagh

- Location in Ireland
- Coordinates: 52.49412°N 9.06372°W
- Country: Ireland
- Province: Munster
- County: County Limerick
- Dáil Éireann: Limerick County
- Eircode routing key: V42
- Dialling code: 069

Ardagh (Irish: Ardach) is a village and civil parish in County Limerick, Ireland. The village is situated round the junctions of the R523 and R521 roads. The nearest town is Newcastle West, 5 kilometres (3 mi) to the south. Primary level education for the village and its surroundings is provided by St Molua's National School. The parish is bounded to the west by Athea, to the north by the parish of Coolcappa, to the east Rathkeale and to the south by Newcastle West. The local GAA club is St. Kierans which represents both the parish of Ardagh-Carrigkerry as well as Coolcappagh-Kilcolman.

== History and archaeology ==
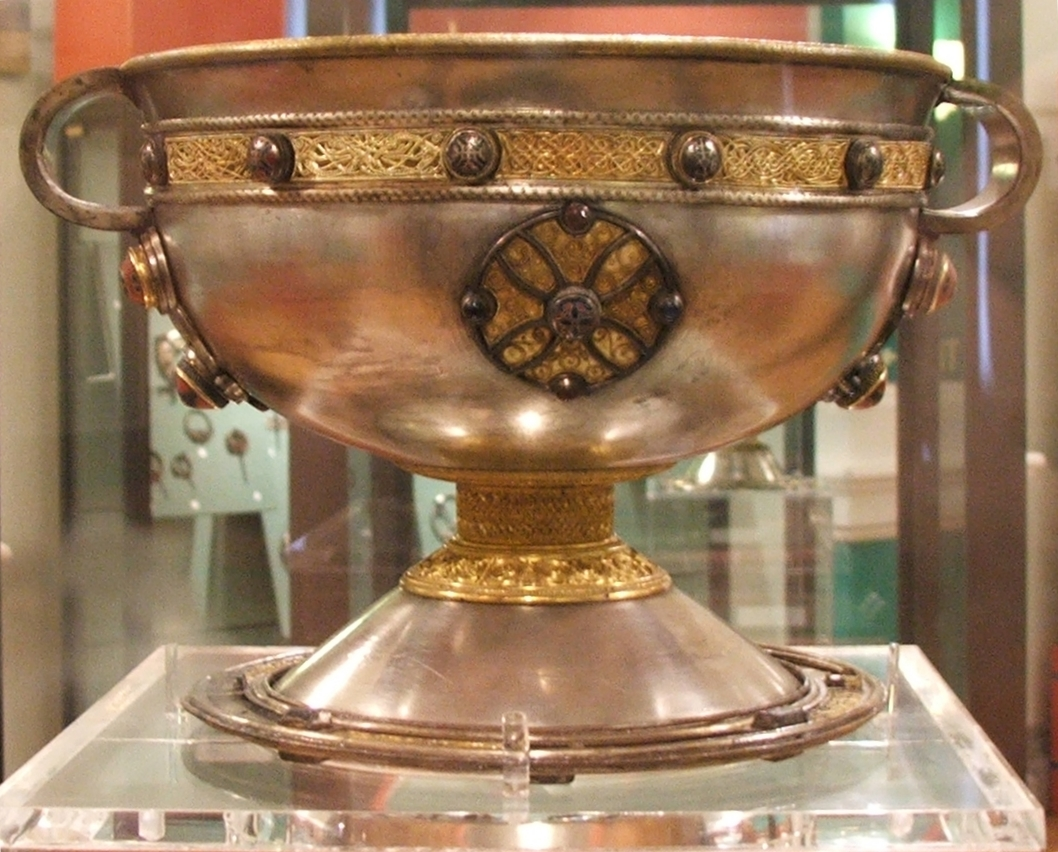
Ardagh Chalice

On 5 March 1867, in the Fenian Rising, an unsuccessful attempt was made by local Fenian supporters to capture the local Royal Irish Constabulary (RIC) barracks. The attack was led by local carpenter William Upton. Many of the Fenians were subsequently arrested, though Upton himself eventually escaped to America.

In 1868, the Ardagh Hoard, including the 8th century Ardagh Chalice, was found in Reerasta rath near Ardagh. The chalice is held in the National Museum of Ireland in Dublin.

== Tourism ==
The Great Southern Trail, a 53-mile (85 km) stretch of countryside in West Limerick/North Kerry, runs through Ardagh as it follows the route of the former Limerick-Tralee railway line (which opened in 1867/1880 and closed in 1975/1977). Bathrooms and picnic tables are available at the restored Ardagh Station House.

== People ==
- William Smith O'Brien, Irish nationalist Member of Parliament (MP) and leader of the Young Ireland movement, had his residence in Cahermoyle House which is a mile from Ardagh village.
