= Carrigkerry =

Village in County Limerick, Ireland

Carrigkerry Carraig Chiarraí
- Village
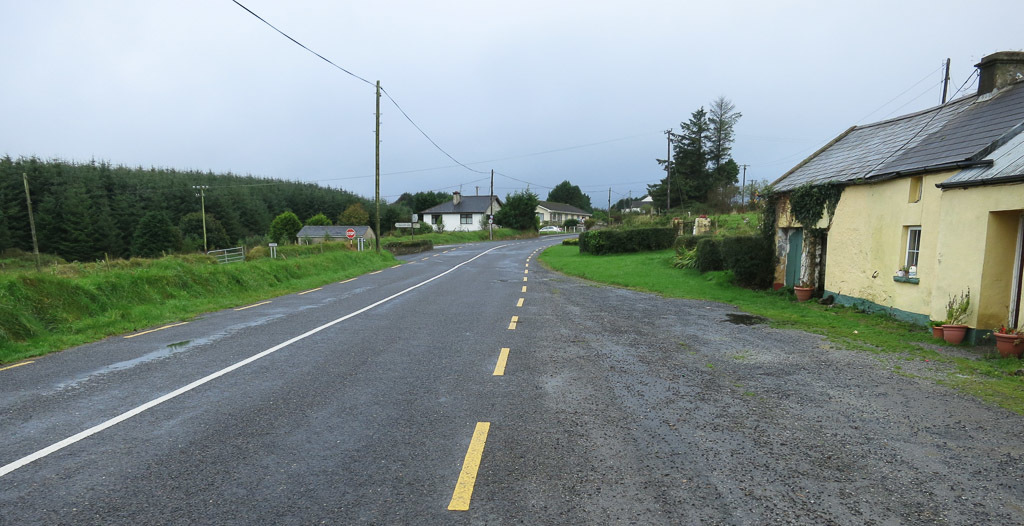
- The R523 regional road near Carrigkerry

- Location in Ireland
- Coordinates: 52°29′40″N 9°08′55″W
- Country: Ireland
- Province: Munster
- County: County Limerick

Population (2016)
  - Total: 184
- Time zone: UTC+0 (WET)
  - Summer (DST): UTC-1 (IST (WEST))
- Irish Grid Reference: R219387

Carrigkerry (Irish: Carraig Chiarraí) is a village and townland in County Limerick, Ireland. The village is in the civil parish of Ardagh, 8 km north-west of Newcastle West, on the R523 road. Carrigkerry is a census town, and had a population of 184 as of the 2016 census.

Carrigkerry is in the Roman Catholic Diocese of Limerick in the parish of Ardagh & Carrigkerry The local church is dedicated to Saint Mary and was built in 1878. The local national (primary) school, Carrigkerry National School, had an enrollment of 52 pupils as of 2017.
