= Athea =

Village in County Limerick, Ireland

Athea Áth an tSléibhe
- Village
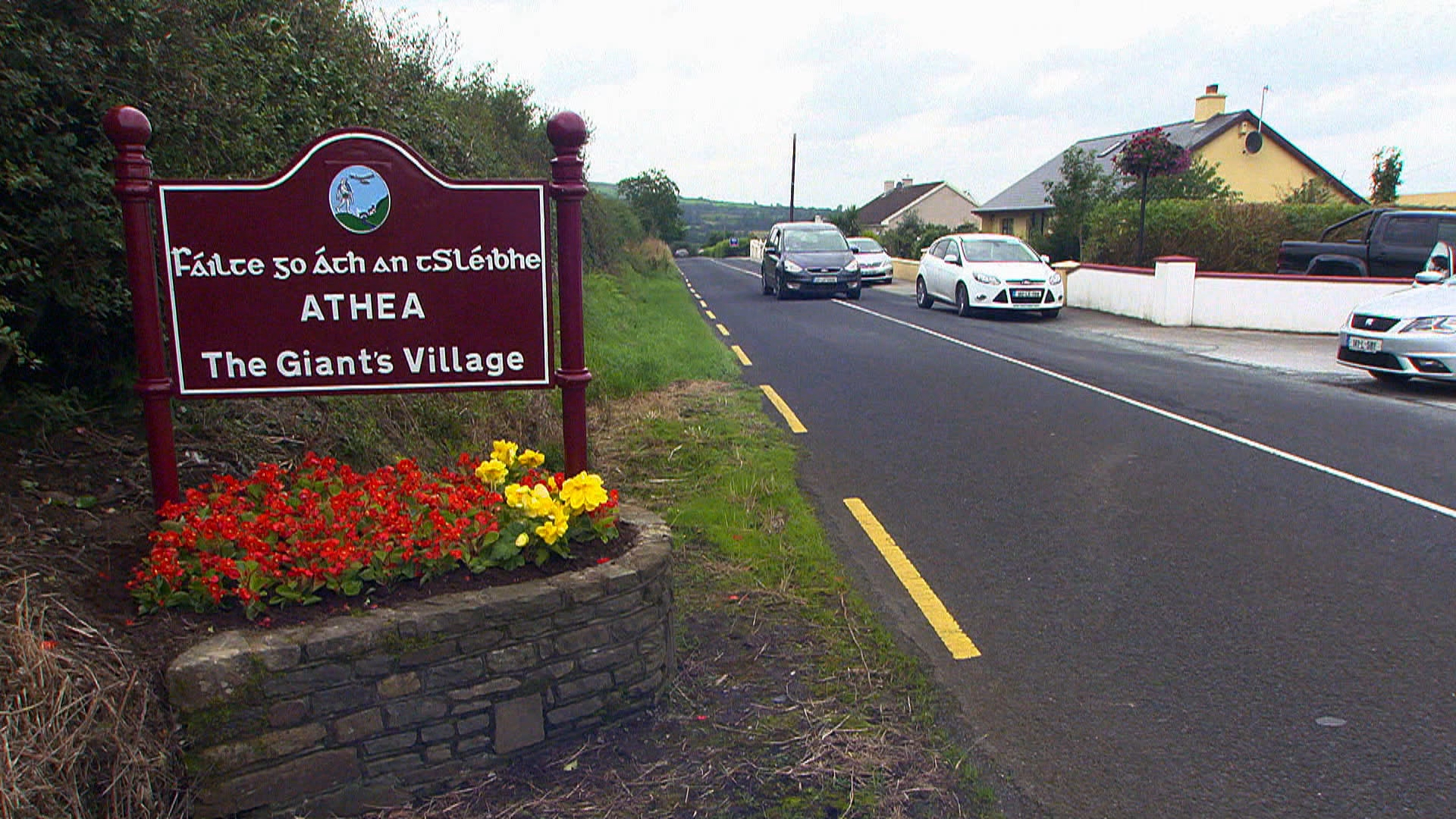
- Welcome (fáilte) sign in Athea

- Location in Ireland
- Coordinates: 52°27′39″N 9°17′22″W
- Country: Ireland
- Province: Munster
- County: County Limerick

Population (2022)
  - Total: 418
- Time zone: UTC+0 (WET)
  - Summer (DST): UTC-1 (IST (WEST))
- Irish grid reference: R124351

Athea (/æˈteɪ/ a-TAY; Irish: Áth an tSléibhe or Áth Té) is a village in west County Limerick, Ireland. Athea has a Roman Catholic church, and is the centre for the parish of Athea, which encompasses several nearby townlands. As of the 2022 census, the village of Athea had a population of 418 people. The R523 and R524 regional roads meet at a junction within the village.

== Geography ==
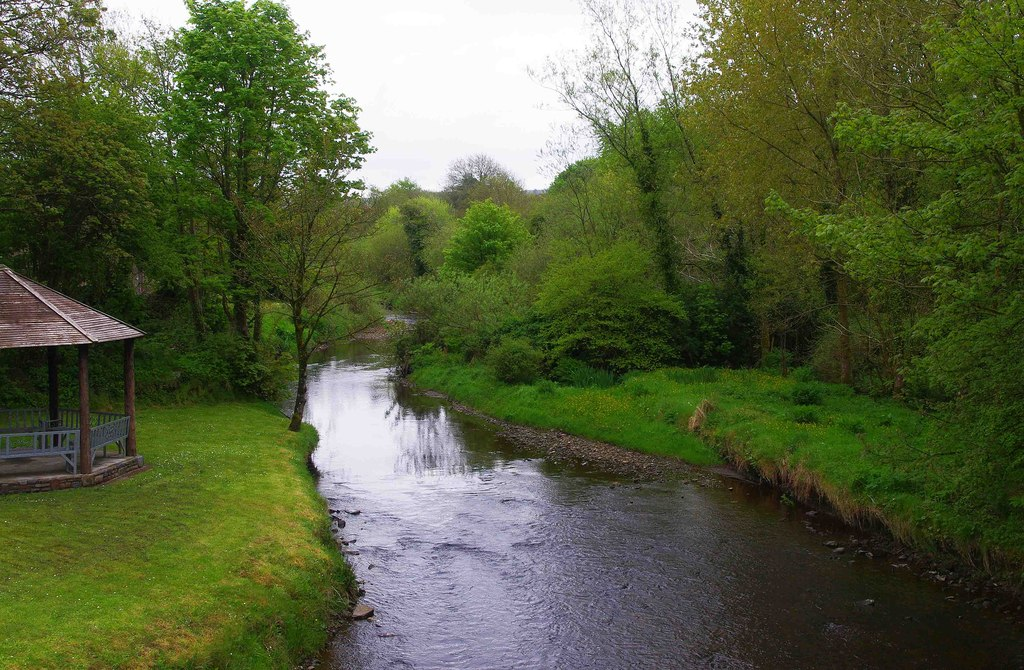
River Galey as seen from the John Paul II footbridge in Athea's village centre

=== Topography ===
The river Galey is a tributary to the larger River Feale. The name is derived from the Irish language "Abhainn na Gáile", River of the Gaille, a tribe who lived along its banks. There are two bridges across the river; the R523/R524 intersection bridge just east of the village and Barry's Bridge, 2 km northwest of the village. Athea has suffered damage and disruption over several years, when the River Galley flooded in 2005, 2008, 2009 and 2015. Proposals and funding to address the issue had been muted for several years, and a civil engineering consultancy were appointed by Limerick County Council in October 2019 to "assess, develop and design" a flood relief scheme.

=== Electoral areas ===
Athea has been in the Dáil constituency of Limerick County since 2016. It is within the electoral area of Newcastle West which is used mainly in local elections.

== History ==
Evidence of ancient settlement in the area includes a number of ringfort and holy well sites in the townlands of Athea Upper, Templeathea and Gortnagross. There is a Mass rock to the east of the village. The Catholic church in Athea, Saint Bartholomew's church, was built in 1832.

An ancient sliotar (hurling ball) was found in a bog and acquired by the National Museum in 1954. One of three such sliotars found in West Limerick, estimates suggest that the Athea ball dates to at least the 17th century.

A replica of a forge, formerly located in Athea, has been built in Bunratty Folk Park in County Clare.

== Built heritage ==
=== Con Colbert Memorial Hall ===
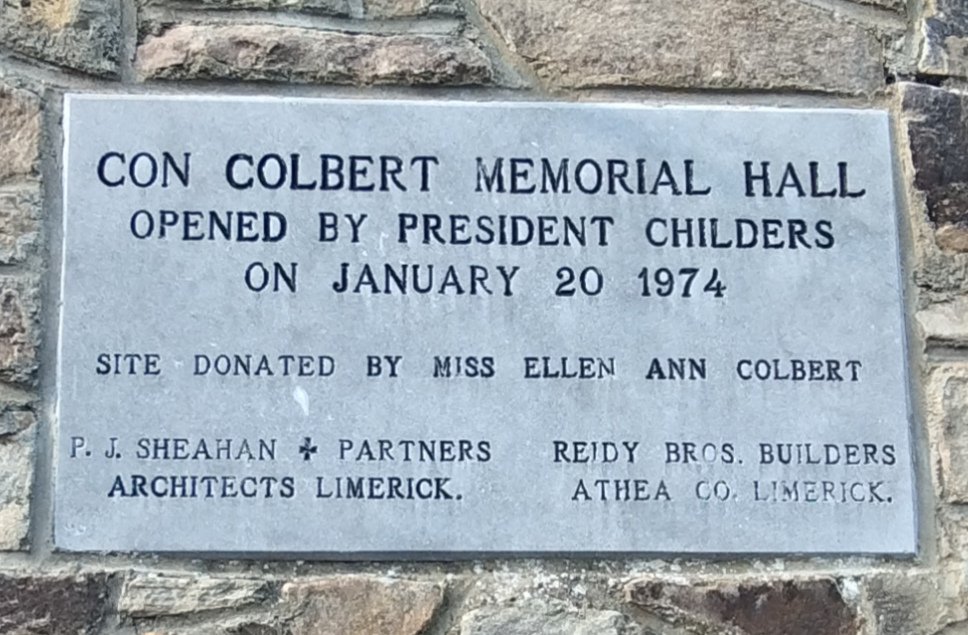
Memorial hall

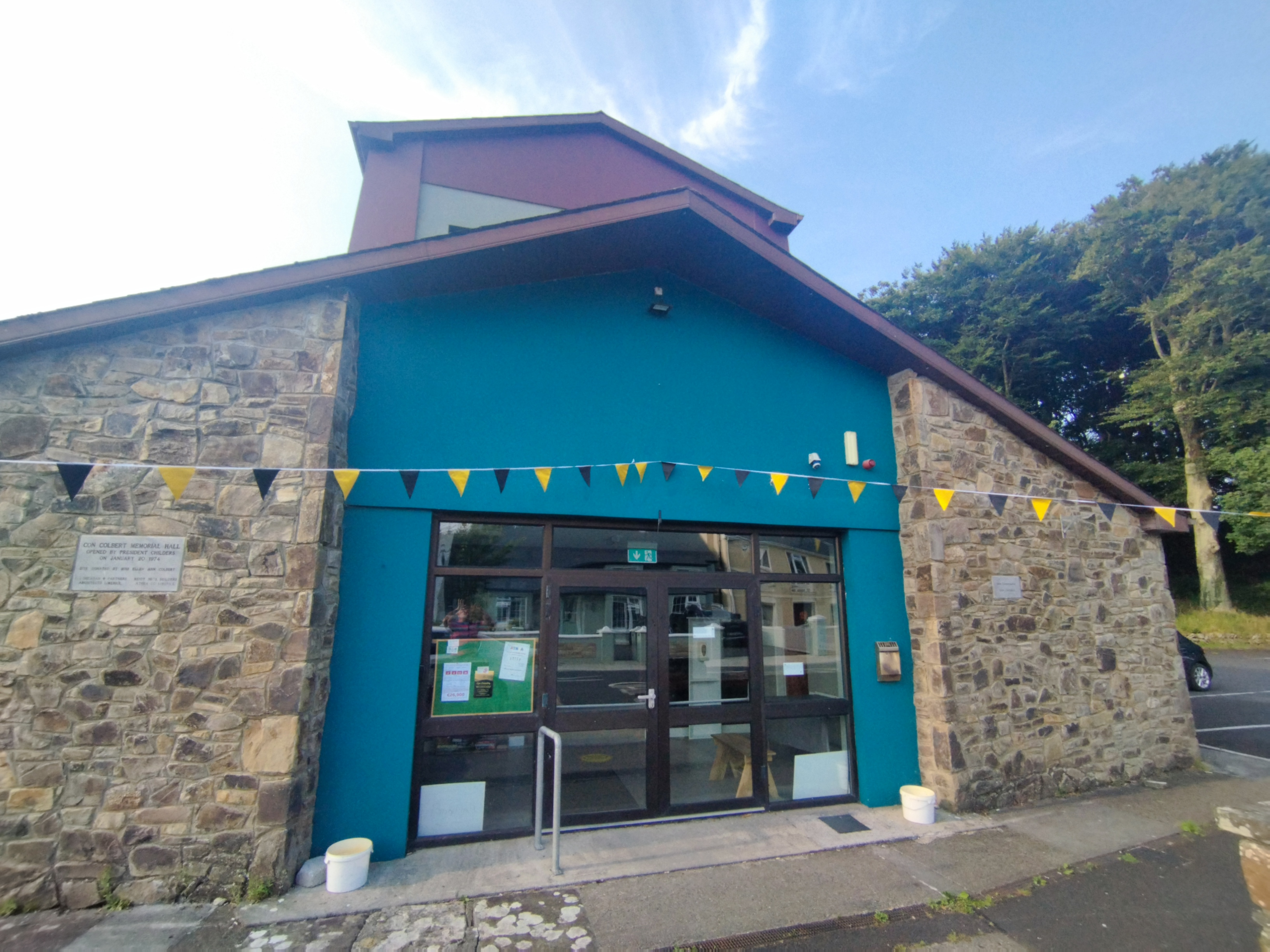
Con Colbert hall

Opened in January 1974 by Erskine Hamilton Childers, Con Colbert Memorial Hall is named after one of the executed leaders of the 1916 Easter Rising.

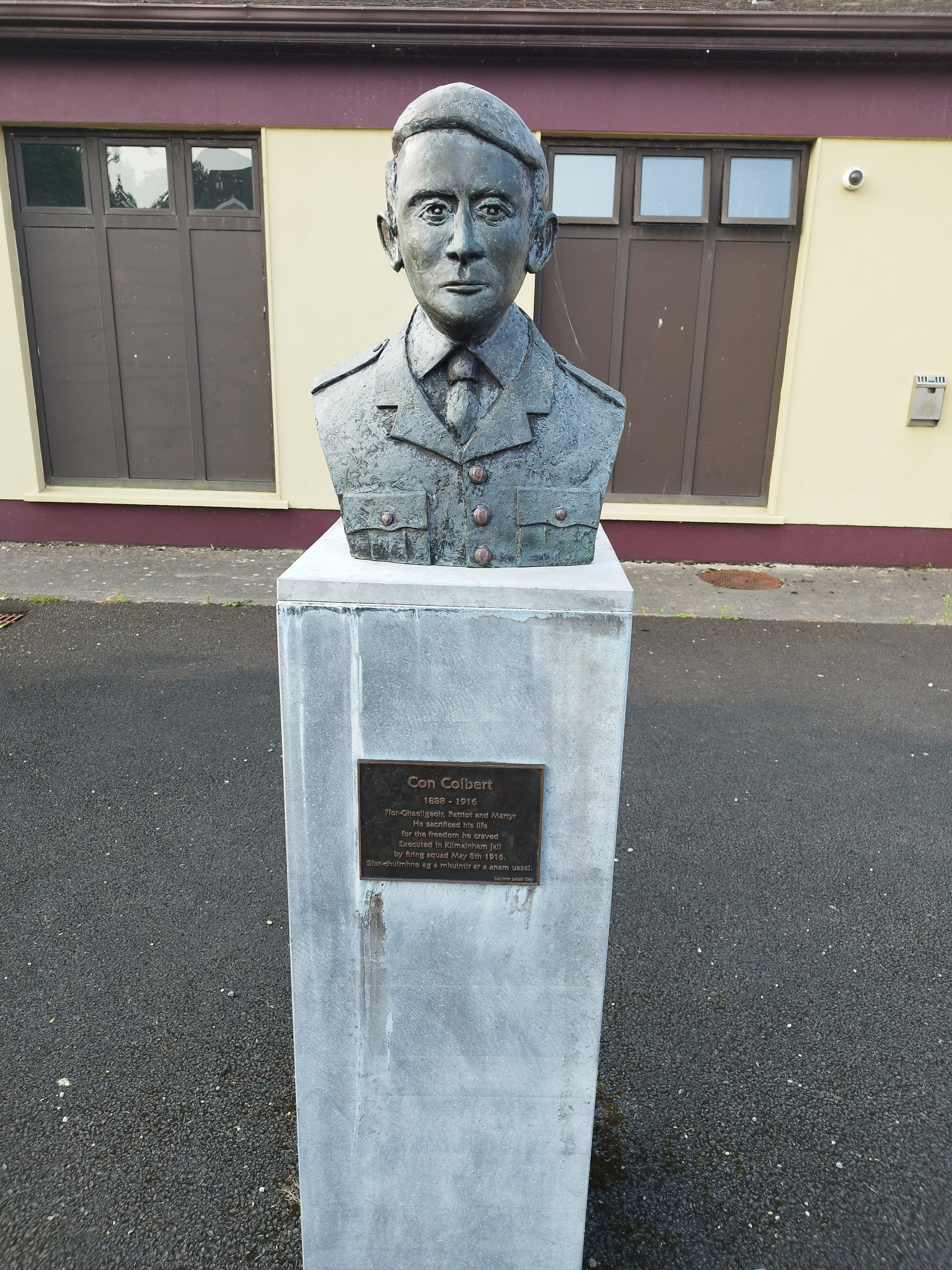
Con Colbert bust

There is also a plaque and a bronze bust of Con Colbert in the grounds of the hall. Both were unveiled, by members of Colbert's extended family, in 2015.

=== John Paul II Footbridge ===
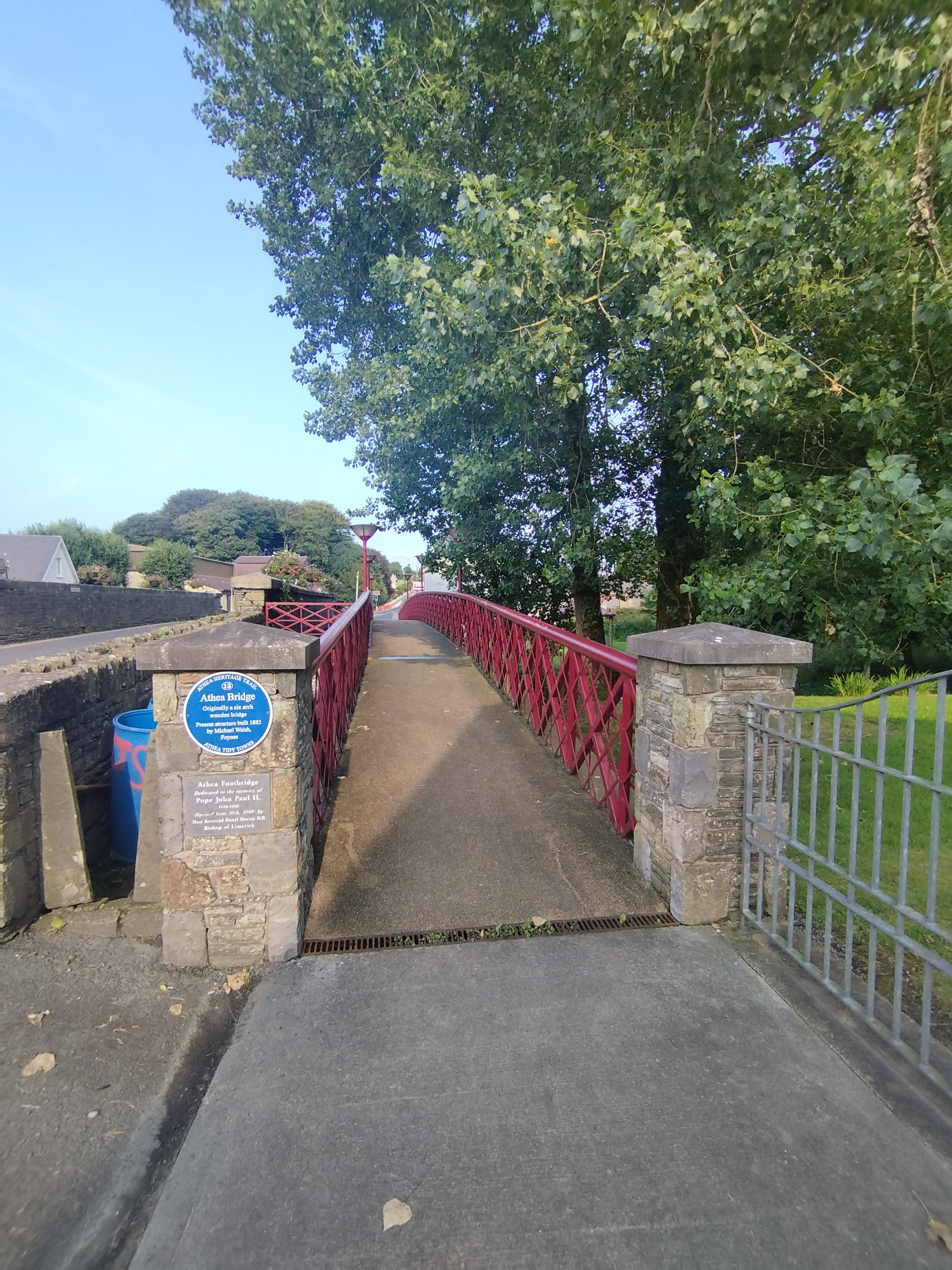
Athea footbridge

Athea's only pedestrian bridge was opened by Donal Murray, Bishop of Limerick, in 2005. The bridge is located next to the existing road bridge at the eastern end of the main street. It had been proposed for years for the local school pupils who were crossing the busy road bridge and was seen as a health and safety hazard sharing the bridge with cars. The bridge is 2 m wide and 11 m long.

=== St. Bartholomew's Church ===
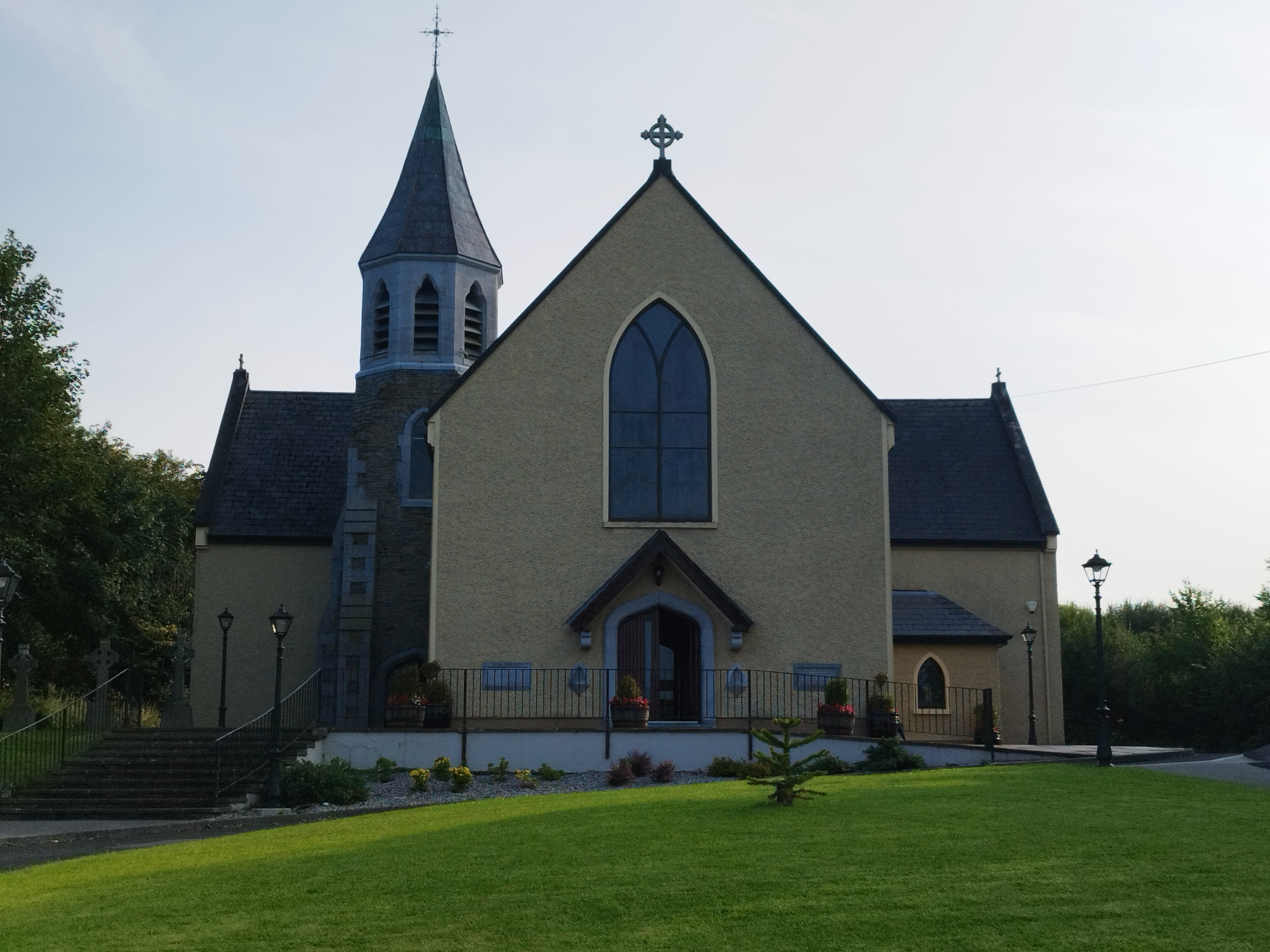
Athea church

St. Bartholomew's Roman Catholic Church is located on the main street and was built in 1832. It underwent renovations in 1862 and 1980s.

=== Athea Carnegie Library ===
Athea's Carnegie library is one of the best-preserved Carnegie library's in Ireland and was featured on a postal stamp released to mark the centenary of the death of Andrew Carnegie. It was built in 1917 to designs by Richard Caulfield Orpen. It is no longer used as a library, but was renovated to be a public-use community space.

=== Other monuments ===
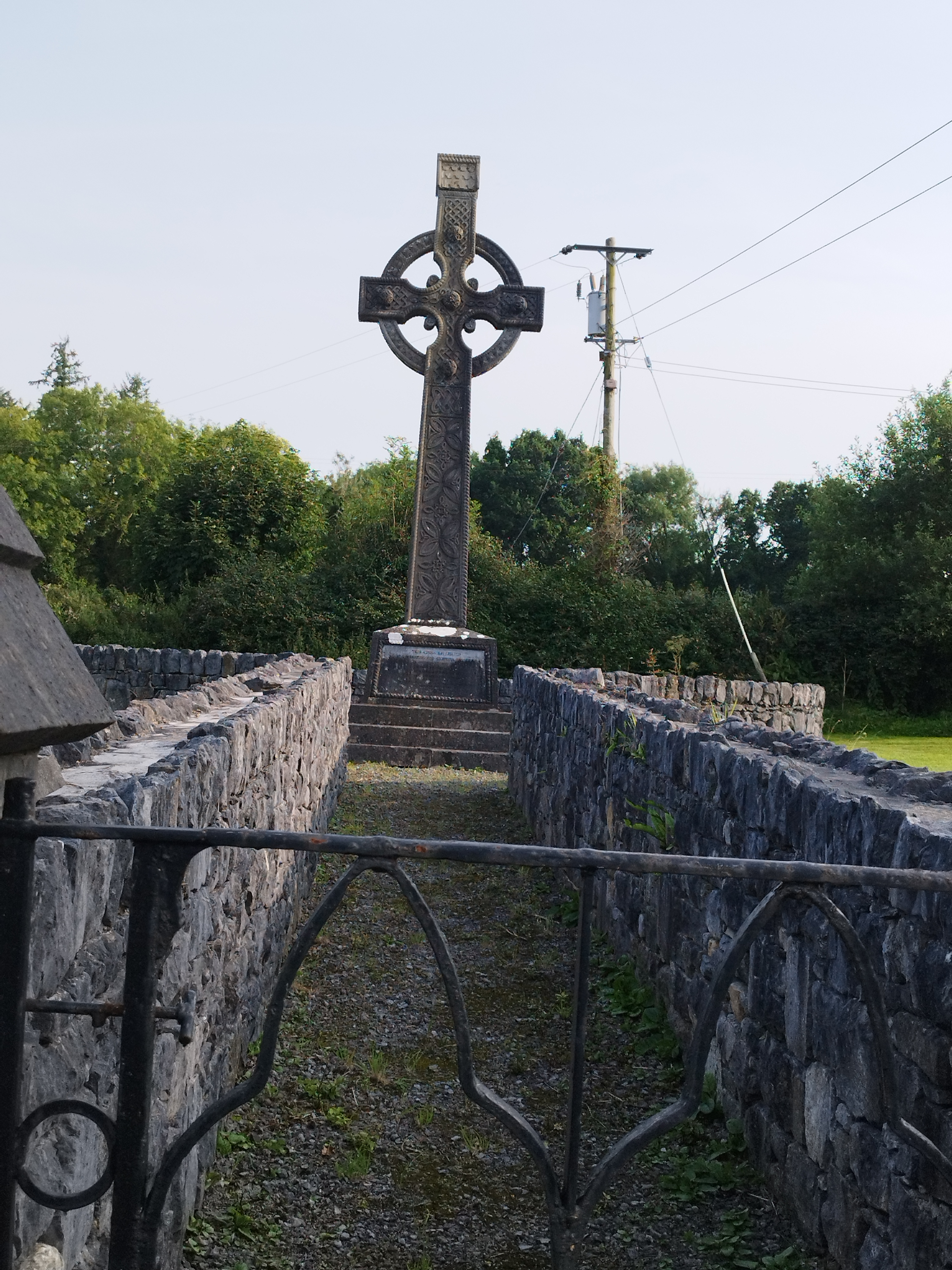
Goold monument

A monument, located in Upper Athea, commemorates James Goold. Goold was a landlord who, at the time of the Great Famine, refused to evict tenants who couldn't pay rent. Dated to 1863, the monument comprises a 4 m high Celtic cross which stands just off the road to Listowel.

Another statue, colloquially called "the feet", is a monument in The Square commemorating two Irish Olympic medalists who were originally from Athea – Tim Ahearne and Dan Ahearne. Tim Ahearne won gold in the triple jump in the 1908 Olympics, while his younger brother Dan Ahearne is known for setting a world record in 1909. The sculpture depicts two golden feet with wings spread out.

== Culture ==
=== Events ===
Annually large events such as the Vintage Rally, TradFéile and Athea Motorcycle Road Races are held during summer months.

Athea Motorcycle Road Races, is a two-day event taking place on a Saturday and Sunday at the end of June. Previous editions of the annual event have attracted approximately 10,000 visitors to the village. Racers such as Martin Finnegan and William Dunlop have taken part in past events.

=== Parklands ===
The "Giant's Garden" is a walk from the Memorial Hall to Holy Cross Cemetery in Templeathea. It is named after a legend that incorporates a giant carrying his deceased mother on his shoulders to be buried. The garden overlooks Athea as well as the hills and river southwest of the village.

== Sport ==
=== Gaelic games ===
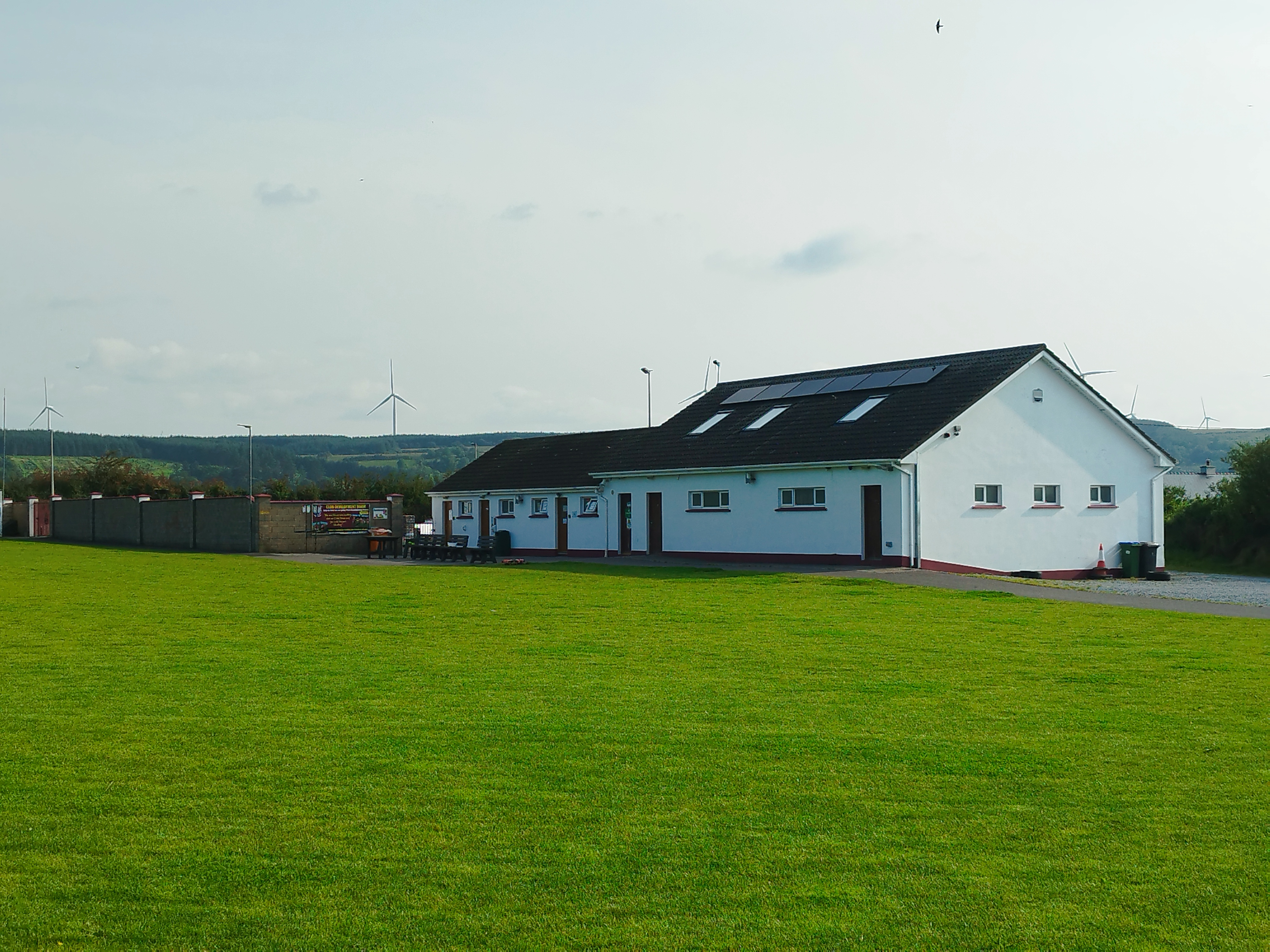
Athea GAA clubhouse

Athea GAA (Áth an tSléibhe CLG) is the local Gaelic Athletic Association club. The club's colours are maroon and white and its grounds are located in Templeathea to the east of the village. Codes played include Gaelic football, hurling and ladies' Gaelic football.

=== Soccer ===
The local association football (soccer) club, Athea United AFC, is located on the Glin road out of Athea. It was first established in 1979 and is an affiliated member of the Limerick Desmond League and the Football Association of Ireland.

=== Basketball ===
Vixens Basketball Club play their home games in the sports hall in the village.

== Demographics ==
At the time of the 2022 census, the population of the village was 418. Approximately 90% of the population were born in Ireland, with 5% born in the UK, 1% in Poland, and the remainder from elsewhere in the world. 89% of census respondents in Athea listed their religion as Catholic, 7% other stated religions and 4% had either had no religion or no stated religion.

== Education ==
The primary school – Athea National School (Athea NS) – was built in 1921. Prior to this, a small thatched schoolhouse was located centrally in the village (now no longer in use). Athea NS is located in Templeathea townland, just east of the village centre. When opened in 1921, it had a capacity of 100 students. A large extension to the school was officially opened in 2009 and, as of 2025, the school had an enrollment of 161 pupils.

== Transport ==
A Limerick-Tralee bus service operates via Athea every Wednesday.

A TFI Local Link service, route R61, also passes through Athea en route from Moyvane to Listowel.

The closest train stations to Athea are Limerick Colbert railway station in Limerick city and Charleville railway station in County Cork.

== Notable people ==
- Tim Ahearne and Dan Ahearn were brothers who competed in the 1908 and 1920 Olympics respectively.
- Kit Ahern, Fianna Fáil politician who served as a Teachta Dála (TD)
- Con Colbert, the youngest man to be executed by the British after the Easter Rising in 1916, lived on his family's farm in Athea.
- Michael Colbert, Fianna Fáil politician who served as a Teachta Dála (TD)
- Kevin Danaher, folklorist and historian, was born in Athea. His early education was at Athea National School and Mungret College, County Limerick.
- Con Greaney, a traditional singer from nearby Rooska, who sang The Road To Athea
- Lisa Murtagh, whose mother is an Athea native, was crowned 48th Rose of Tralee. She represented New York, but acknowledged Athea as her "second home" in her speech at the pageant in 2008.

== See also ==
- List of towns and villages in Ireland
