= R521 road (Ireland) =

Road in Ireland

Coordinates: 52.586974°N 9.086929°W

R521 road
- Bóthar R521
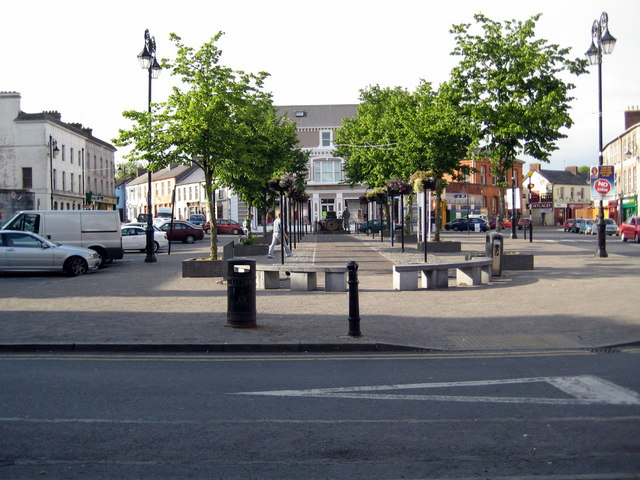
- The Square, Newcastle West, on the R521

Route information
- Length: 19.0 km (11.8 mi)

Major junctions
- From: N69 Sroolane
- Passed through Shanagolden; R523 Ardagh
- To: N21 Newcastle West

Location
- Country: Ireland

Highway system
- Roads in Ireland; Motorways; Primary; Secondary; Regional

The R521 road is a regional road in Ireland, located in County Limerick.
