= Newcastle West =

Town in County Limerick, Ireland

Newcastle West An Caisleán Nua Thiar
- Town
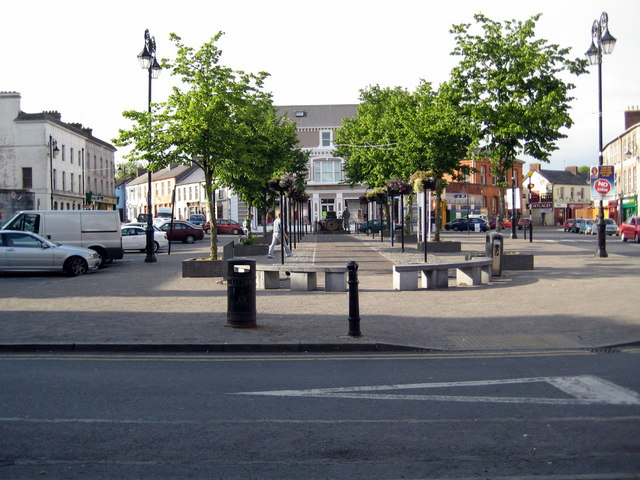
- The Square

- Location in Ireland
- Coordinates: 52.451°N 9.055°W
- Country: Ireland
- Province: Munster
- County: County Limerick
- Local electoral area: Newcastle
- Dáil constituency: Limerick County
- EU Parliament: South
- Elevation: 55 m (180 ft)

Population (2022)
  - Total: 7,209
- Time zone: UTC0 (WET)
  - Summer (DST): UTC+1 (IST)
- Eircode routing key: V42
- Area code: +353(0)69
- Irish Grid Reference: R282336

Newcastle West (Irish: An Caisleán Nua Thiar) or simply Newcastle (An Caisleán Nua, formerly anglicised as Castlenoe) is a town in west County Limerick, Ireland. It is the largest town in the county, excluding Limerick city. It is also the county town and sits on the River Arra, which flows into the River Deel. Newcastle West is in the middle of a great bowl-shaped valley in West Limerick, known one time as the valley of the Wild Boar, apparently due to the abundance of this animal here when the area was thickly wooded. The crest of the town carries the image of a wild boar. The town is partly in the civil parish of Newcastle.

Newcastle West is on the N21 road from Limerick to Tralee, between Rathkeale and Abbeyfeale. It is the second-largest urban center in the county, with a population of 7,209 in 2022.

== History ==
=== Foundation and development ===
Newcastle West grew up around a castle, the ruins of which are located off the town square. The large castle ruins are well maintained.

The castle was built by the FitzGerald family, who arrived at some point after 1194. By 1298, the castle had been completed in stone. The town then came to be known as Newcastle, West Limerick, but over time, the 'west' became part of Newcastle and the town was known by the current name, Newcastle West.

According to Begley, the parish was called Newcastle and Ardagh in 1704. Newcastle was joined with Monagea from 1722 until 1764, when it became a separate parish. Lewis stated that parts of Monagea and Killeedy were in the parish of Newcastle West.

Two notable mentions included in the history of the diocese of Limerick were the first Monsignor in the diocese, Richard Baptist O'Brien in 1881, and Denis Hallinan, who was P.P. here and later became Bishop.

Sir William Courtenay, the local landlord, held 10,500 acres (42 km^{2}) of land in Newcastle West in the late 16th century. He was a staunch Catholic and suffered persecution for his beliefs. His son George may have practiced his faith in secret. Their home was reputed to have had a room in which priests were hidden. William Courtenay was denounced in the House of Commons as a papist recusant in 1624.

During the reign of Elizabeth I, three battles were fought near here. Tradition has it that the locals killed many of the Knights Templar. The town was sacked in 1302 and destroyed in 1315. Two of the Earls of Desmond died here. Garrett (better known as Gearóid Iarla) in 1399, and James, the 8th earl, in 1462.

Markets were held on Tuesday, Thursday, and Saturday. Large numbers used to attend Thursday's hiring fairs for farm workers. Fairs were held on 1 April, 3 May, 12 July, 20 August, 1 October, and 10 December.

The motto that goes with the town coat of arms is "As Dúchas Dóchas", which may be translated as 'Our Hope springs from our Traditions'. The town now has a population of 7,209. The urban area has passed well beyond the old town boundaries, which are due for redefinition.

=== 2008 flooding ===
On 1 August 2008, up to 20 homes were badly affected by overnight flash flooding in Newcastle West, in an incident described as a 'freak' occurrence. A number of people had to be rescued from their houses after the River Arra burst its banks following heavy rain. There were a few injuries, however, an elderly woman was taken to the hospital after she was airlifted from her home suffering from hypothermia. 3,000 homes in Newcastle West temporarily lost power. The Killarney Road (N21) was temporarily closed as was the R522 to Dromcolliher and the Bruff line.

== Business and commerce ==
The West Limerick and Newcastle West area has traditionally had a strong dairy and agricultural contribution to the local economy. Huge changes have occurred during the last 20 – 30 years seeing the expanding of the town as a services centre for West Limerick, also bringing an increase in population. Many people who work in Limerick City live in Newcastle West and its environs and commute the 42 kilometres (26 mi) daily. However, Newcastle West itself is now a large centre of employment. Employers include Pallas Foods, Rettig Myson, Ballygowan Spring Water and Filtertek. There are dozens of businesses employing 10-50 people. The town also has a number of supermarkets, clothes shops and fashion boutiques.

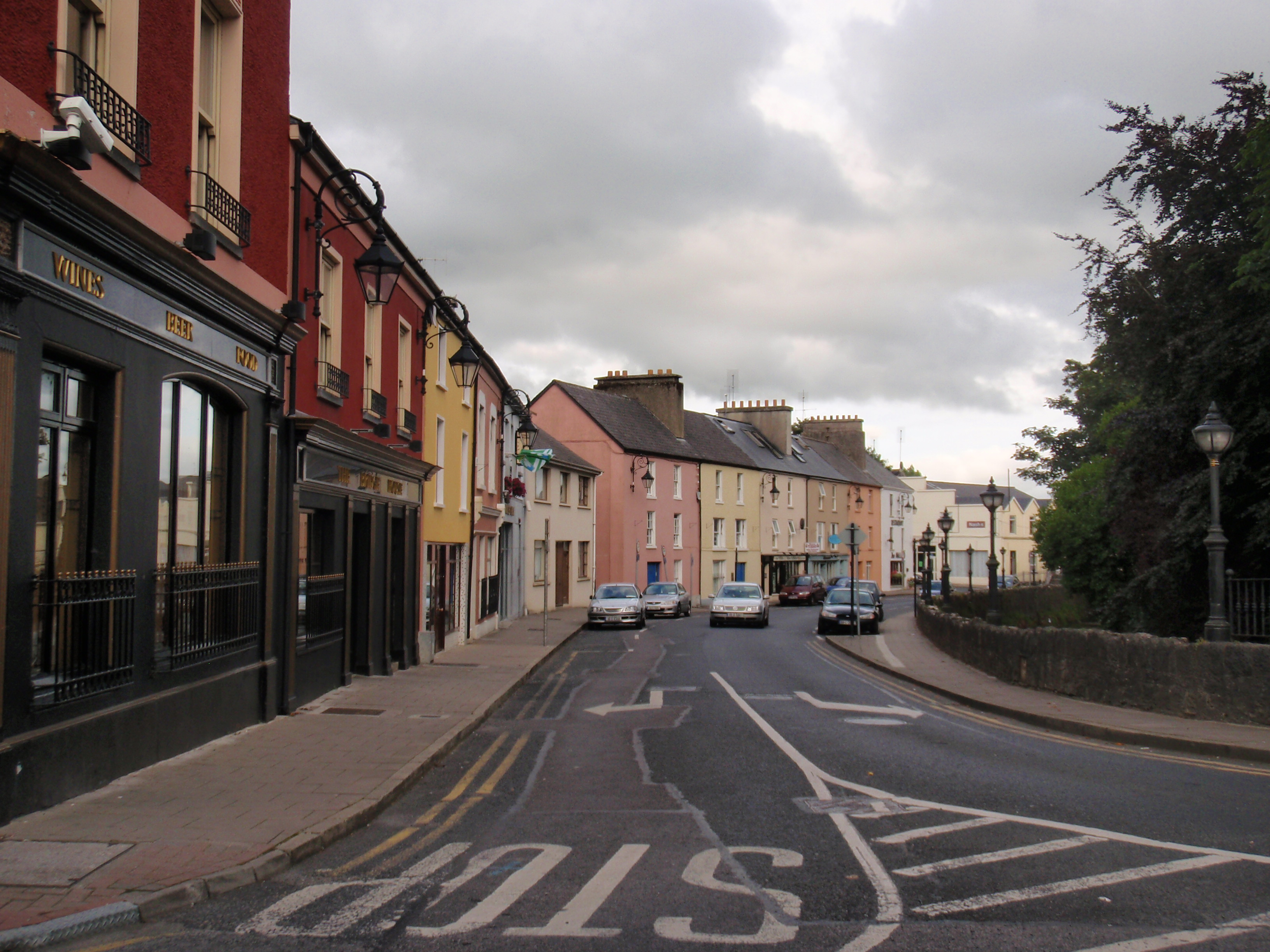
A Street by the River

== Education ==
Newcastle West has four primary schools: Courtenay Boys' School, Scoil Iosaf (an all-girls school), Gaelscoil O'Doghair (an Irish language school), and a school in the countryside, Killoughteen National School. The town also has three secondary schools, named Scoil Mhuire Agus Ide (English translation: the School of Mary and Ita), Desmond College and Gaelcholáiste Uí Chonba (All Irish Second-level school on the grounds of Desmond College).

== Transport ==
Newcastle West is situated on the Irish national primary road N21, where it is joined by the R520, R521 and R522 regional roads. Newcastle West is forty minutes drive from Limerick City and an hour from Killarney. It is within a one-hour drive of Shannon, and Kerry International Airports, and two hours from Cork Airport.

The town is serviced by regular Bus Éireann buses and Dublin Coaches to Tralee, Killarney, Limerick and Dublin.

The town was connected to the railway network until 1975, as part of the "North Kerry" line, from Limerick city to Tralee, via Rathkeale and Listowel. Newcastle West railway station was on Bishop Street and opened on 1 January 1857. It closed for passenger traffic on 4 February 1963, regular goods traffic on 2 December 1974 and finally closed on 3 November 1975, although occasional passenger special trains, diesel and steam hauled, had operated into the 1970s. The station had an unusual layout, with two turntables and water columns for steam locomotives, the result of the lines from the Rathkeale and Abbeyfeale directions having been built by different companies. After the tracks were lifted in the late 1980s, in 1999, the former station house was restored as a private house within the Bishop Court development of the station area. The Great Southern Trail walking and cycling route follows the line of the railway, passing the site of the now-demolished twin-arch road bridge which spanned the lines to Rathkeale/Limerick and Abbeyfeale/Tralee just before they diverged.

== Sport ==
Newcastle West is home to numerous sports clubs, including Newcastle West GAA club, Newcastle West Rugby Football club, and had two association football clubs: Newcastle West A.F.C. and Newcastle West Rovers F.C., which amalgamated in 2018 to form Newcastle West Town AFC.

== Places of interest ==
=== Buildings, bridges, parks ===
- The Square

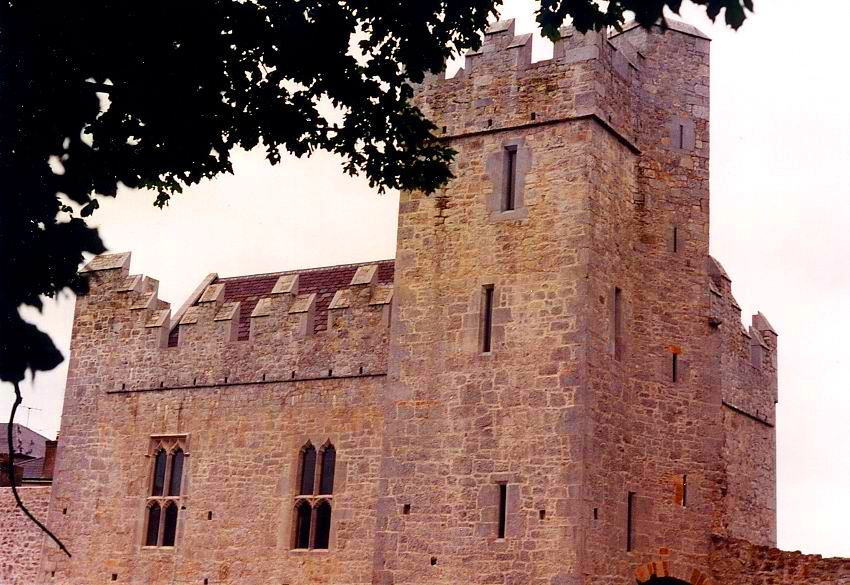
Desmond Banqueting Hall and Castle

- Desmond Banqueting Hall and Castle - Newcastle West's landmark feature dominates the southern of end of the main town square. The banqueting hall of Desmond Castle, seat of the Earl of Desmond, parts of which date from the 13th century, is the most notable historical feature of the town. The castle dates from the 15th century and during the later part of the 20th century was partly restored and is open to the public for guided tours from May to September. The area in front of the banqueting hall was the site of the Protestant church, built in 1777. The castle's demesne contains approximately 0.4 square kilometres (99 acres) of parkland as well as playing areas and sports fields.
- Slí na Sláinte - Walking trails which include the Square and the demesne.
- Great Southern Trail - A walking trail developed along the disused railway line. It joins Newcastle West to Rathkeale and Abbeyfeale, via Barna and Templeglantine. This amenity can be accessed either from the town center via a linking path through the Bishop's Court estate or directly via the trailhead on Station Road.
- Churchtown graveyard and grotto - The old (Catholic) church ruins in Churchtown date back hundreds of years.
- Old IRA monument - situated opposite the church, this monument commemorates 17 volunteers who were killed during the Irish War of Independence and Irish Civil War. The monument was unveiled by President Seán T. O'Kelly in 1955.
- Church of the Immaculate Conception (Catholic) - built in 1828 with oversight by Father Thomas Coll P.P. The local landlord, the Earl of Devon, gave the site with the parishioners providing voluntary labour in the building work.
- Iron footbridge - crossing over the river Arra, the bridge is located opposite the church and was erected by Edward Curling, the landlord's agent in Newcastle West from 1848 to 1874.
- Famine graveyard - located at the rear of St. Ita's Hospital. Many hundreds of people who died in the workhouse during the famine are buried there in unmarked graves. The cemetery is marked by a plain old cross and modern limestone gates sculptured by Cliodna Cussen, showing scenes from the famine and commissioned by the Famine Cemetery Committee.
- St. Bridget's Well - located in Shanagarry on the Killarney Road.
- Carnegie Library - located in the Market Yard, this building was built by the Carnegie Trust and founded by the Scottish philanthropist Andrew Carnegie. The building housed a secondary school for many years. It is now a commercial centre.
- Bridge of Tears - located at the south of the town at the junction of the Cork Road and Bruff Line, there is a stone bridge that takes its name from being a last farewell point. Known locally as the "Bridge of Sorrows" (or tears), during the time of the famine, emigrants from all over West Limerick said their last goodbyes before walking or taking a carriage to Cork and a boat to North America or further.
- Barnagh Gap - About 7 kilometres west of the town is the viewpoint at Barnagh Gap, which provides an east facing view over County Limerick, West Tipperary/ Galtee Mountains and north County Cork.

=== Great Southern Trail Ireland ===
The Great Southern Trail is a 53-mile (85 km) stretch of countryside in West Limerick/North Kerry. It is the route taken by the former Limerick - Tralee railway line, which opened in 1867/1880 and closed in 1975/1977. The Great Southern Trail Action Group is a non-profit group working to develop the Limerick to Tralee section as a rail trail. The group is based around the Newcastle West area.

== Surrounding area ==
Ardagh, Dromcolliher, Broadford, Carrigkerry, Kilmeedy, Castlemahon, Feenagh, Ballingarry, Knockaderry, Feohanagh and Killeedy are all villages within 10 miles of Newcastle West.

== Notable people ==
- John Wolfe Ambrose, civil engineer who was born locally and went on to become a New York City developer
- Denis Cussen, Irish international rugby player, Olympian and pioneer in Sports Medicine
- Michael Hartnett, poet
- Mary, Lady Heath, an Irish aviator, began life as Sophie Catherine Theresa Mary Peirce-Evans in Knockaderry, County Limerick, before moving to Newcastle West. She was one of the best-known women in the world for a five-year period from the mid-1920s.
- Philomena Lee, subject of "The Lost Child of Philomena Lee" by Martin Sixsmith.
- John St. John Long, quack doctor who claimed to be able to cure tuberculosis
- Max Arthur Macauliffe, civil servant and scholar
- William Nash, recipient of the Victoria Cross.
- Claire O'Riordan, Republic of Ireland national team footballer

== See also ==
- List of towns and villages in Ireland
- Market Houses in Ireland
