= Urban areas in the Republic of Ireland for the 2011 census =

The following table gives all the urban areas in Ireland listed in the Central Statistics Office (CSO) report of the 2011 census. This includes cities, boroughs, and towns with local government councils, and other places identified by the CSO with at least 50 occupied dwellings. Census towns are required to have a local area plan if they have a population over 5,000, and are permitted to have one with a population over 1,500.

== Explanation of table ==
Column name	Meaning	Explanation	Sources
Name(s)	Names of the town, or of each settlement grouped into a single census town	The first name listed is the commonest English name, and links to the relevant article. Alternative names are listed in parentheses. If the official name used in census reports is not the linked name, it is in italics. For municipal areas, only the name of the municipality is given, not that of any suburban areas (e.g. Tallaght is not named separately from Dublin). For multiple non-municipal settlements forming a single census town, the settlements are linked separately (e.g. Aghada–Farsid–Rostellan).	
Council	Type of municipal council (1898–2014)	The Local Government Act 2001 defined three types of municipal council, namely "City", "Borough", and "Town". The "Town council" label replaced the earlier "Urban district council" and "Town commissioners", but did not abolish the distinction in their respective powers. The Local Government Reform Act 2014 abolished all Borough and Town Councils, and merged some City councils with an adjoining county council. Values listed in this column are as follows: City / For the pre-2001 county boroughs which retain the same powers as county councils. (Note: Kilkenny is a Borough for administrative purposes. It retains the right to the description "City" for ceremonial purposes.); City merged / For the pre-2001 county boroughs which were merged with county councils in 2014.; Borough / For the few ancient boroughs whose charters were not extinguished by the Municipal Corporations (Ireland) Act 1840 or promoted to the status later. Their powers are practically identical to those of the former urban districts, but the label "borough" is more prestigious. Abolished in 2014.; UD / Town council which was formerly an urban district council under the Local Government (Ireland) Act 1898. Abolished in 2014.; Comm / Town council which was formerly town commissioners, less powerful than an urban district council. Abolished in 2014.; (Sched) / Non-municipal town, with no council of its own, entirely governed by the county council, but listed in Part II of the First Schedule to the Local Government (Planning and Development) Act, 1963. This Act treated these areas as urban rather than rural for planning purposes. Though the 1963 Act is now repealed the scheduled list is still used under the Land Act, 1965 for conveyancing.; — / Non-municipal town, with no council of its own, entirely governed by the county council.	
Core County	Core county for town	For municipal towns, the core county is that in which the municipal area is entirely located. In the case of cities, the namesake county is considered the core county even though the city is administratively separate from it. For non-municipal towns which span a county boundary, the core county is the one in which the majority of the population lives. The administrative counties created from counties Dublin (Dún Laoghaire–Rathdown, Fingal, and South Dublin) are sorted separately but adjacently for convenience.	
Other Counties	Other counties	For towns which span a county boundary (including suburbs/environs of municipal towns), any county other than the core county.	
2006 pop	Total population in 2006	For municipal towns, the total is the sum of the municipal population and the suburban population. The municipal population is within the legally defined municipal boundary. The suburban population is defined as "the continuation of a distinct population cluster outside its legally defined boundary in which no occupied dwelling is more than 200 metres distant from the nearest occupied dwelling. In applying the 200-metre criterion, industrial, commercial and recreational buildings and facilities are not regarded as breaking the continuity of a built-up area. New suburbs or environs are defined only where there are at least twenty occupied dwellings outside the legal boundary within the new limit."; For non-municipal towns, the total area was defined by the CSO as "a cluster of fifty or more occupied dwellings where, within a radius of 800 metres there was a nucleus of thirty occupied dwellings (on both sides of a road, or twenty on one side of a road), along with a clearly defined urban centre e.g. a shop, a school, a place of worship or a community centre. Census town boundaries were extended over time where there was an occupied dwelling within 200 metres of the existing boundary." Blank for the 102 new census towns created for the 2011 census.	
2011 pop	Total population in 2011.	The total area was defined more restrictively than in 2011. This change was in response to low-density ribbon development in rural areas.: For municipal towns, the 2011 suburban definition was changed from the 2006 definition by reducing the limit from 200 metres to 100.; For non-municipal towns, the definition was "a cluster of 50 or more occupied dwellings, with a maximum distance between any dwelling and the building closest to it of 100 metres, and where there was evidence of an urban centre (shop, school etc)."	
% change	Change in total population	As a percentage of 2006 population. Blank for the 102 new census towns created for the 2011 census.	Calculated
Area	Total area of the town	2011 area in square kilometres (km^{2}). The CSO report only gives a figure for towns with a total population of at least 1,500.	
Density	Population density of total area	Persons per km^{2}. Based on 2011 total area and population.	Calculated

== Table ==
Name(s)	Council	Core County	Other Counties	2006 pop	2011 pop	% change	Area	Density
Dublin	City (Note: Blanchardstown, Clondalkin, Lucan-Doddsborough, and Tallaght, scheduled separately in 1963, are now part of the Dublin metropolitan area.)	Dublin	Dublin (Dún Laoghaire–Rathdown, Fingal, South Dublin)	1,045,769	1,110,627	6.2	317.5	3498.1
Cork	City	Cork		190,384	198,582	4.3	164.6	1206.7
Limerick	City merged	Limerick	Clare	90,757 (Note: Coonagh was a census town in the 2006 census, but in 2011 is included within the suburbs of Limerick.)	91,454	0.8	56.8	1609
Galway	City	Galway		72,729	76,778	5.6	53.4	1437.3
Waterford	City merged	Waterford	Kilkenny	49,213	51,519	4.7	44.3	1161.9
Drogheda	Borough	Louth	Meath	35,090	38,578	9.9	15.3	2529.7
Wexford	Borough	Wexford		18,163	20,072	10.5	18.9	1062.6
Sligo	Borough	Sligo		19,402	19,452	0.3	15.4	1260.7
Clonmel	Borough	Tipperary	Waterford	17,008	17,908	5.3	16.5	1088
Kilkenny	Borough	Kilkenny		22,179	24,423	10.1	13.4	1825.3
Dundalk	UD	Louth		35,085	37,816	7.8	36.7	1029.6
Bray	UD	Wicklow	Dublin (Dún Laoghaire–Rathdown)	31,901	31,872	-0.1	9.2	3475.7
Navan (An Uaimh)	UD	Meath		24,851 (Note: Balreask was a census town in the 2006 census, but in 2011 is included within the environs of Navan.)	28,559	14.9	22.2	1284.7
Ennis	UD	Clare		24,253	25,360	4.6	22.7	1119.6
Tralee	UD	Kerry		22,744	23,693	4.2	16	1478
Carlow	UD	Carlow	Laois	20,724	23,030	11.1	12.5	1846.8
Naas	UD	Kildare		20,044	20,713	3.3	18.2	1135.6
Athlone	UD	Westmeath	Roscommon	17,544	20,153	14.9	17.3	1162.9
Letterkenny	UD	Donegal		17,586	19,588	11.4	23.9	820.3
Tullamore	UD	Offaly		12,927	14,361	11.1	10.6	1354.8
Killarney	UD	Kerry		14,603	14,219	-2.6	18.9	754.3
Arklow	UD	Wicklow		11,759	13,009	10.6	6.8	1924.4
Cobh	UD	Cork		11,303	12,347	9.2	4.5	2756
Castlebar	UD	Mayo		11,891	12,318	3.6	13.5	909.7
Midleton	UD	Cork		10,048	12,001	19.4	6.2	1929.4
Mallow	UD	Cork		10,241	11,605	13.3	8.4	1384.8
Ballina	UD	Mayo		10,409	11,086	6.5	15	741
Enniscorthy	UD	Wexford		9,538	10,838	13.6	8.8	1228.8
Wicklow	UD	Wicklow		10,070	10,356	2.8	5	2092.1
Cavan	UD	Cavan		7,883	10,205	29.5	9.2	1109.2
Athy	UD	Kildare		8,218	9,926	20.8	12.4	799.8
Longford	UD	Longford		8,836	9,601	8.7	10.7	894.8
Dungarvan	UD	Waterford		8,362	9,427	12.7	8.4	1116.9
Nenagh	UD	Tipperary		7,751	8,439	8.9	9.1	931.5
Trim	UD	Meath		6,870	8,268	20.3	4.3	1945.4
New Ross	UD	Wexford	Kilkenny	7,709	8,151	5.7	4.7	1719.6
Thurles	UD	Tipperary		7,682	7,933	3.3	6.6	1202
Youghal	UD	Cork		6,785	7,794	14.9	5.6	1389.3
Monaghan	UD	Monaghan		6,710	7,452	11.1	6.5	1153.6
Buncrana	UD	Donegal		5,911	6,839	15.7	8.3	824
Ballinasloe	UD	Galway	Roscommon	6,303	6,659	5.6	17.7	375.8
Fermoy	UD	Cork		5,873	6,489	10.5	3.9	1655.4
Westport	UD	Mayo		5,475	6,063	10.7	9.8	621.2
Carrick-on-Suir	UD	Tipperary	Waterford	5,906	5,931	0.4	9.1	653.2
Kells (Ceannanus Mór)	UD	Meath		5,248	5,888	12.2	3	1943.2
Birr	UD	Offaly	Tipperary	5,081	5,822	14.6	9.4	620
Tipperary	UD	Tipperary		5,065	5,310	4.8	5.4	987
Carrickmacross	UD	Monaghan		4,387	4,925	12.3	4.7	1039
Kinsale	UD	Cork		4,099	4,893	19.4	3.3	1473.8
Listowel	UD	Kerry		4,338	4,832	11.4	8.4	578
Clonakilty	UD	Cork		4,154	4,721	13.6	5.2	914.9
Cashel	UD	Tipperary		2,936	4,051	38	2.4	1723.8
Macroom	UD	Cork		3,553	3,879	9.2	10.8	360.2
Castleblayney	UD	Monaghan		3,124	3,634	16.3	3.3	1118.2
Kilrush	UD	Clare		2,694	2,695	0	5.5	494.5
Skibbereen	UD	Cork		2,338	2,670	14.2	4.3	622.4
Bundoran	UD	Donegal		1,964	2,140	9	5.1	422.1
Templemore	UD	Tipperary		2,384	2,071	-13.1	4.9	420.9
Clones	UD	Monaghan		1,767	1,761	-0.3	2.3	769
Newbridge (Droichead Nua)	Comm	Kildare		18,520	21,561	16.4	8.2	2642.3
Portlaoise	Comm	Laois		14,613	20,145	37.9	9.7	2074.7
Mullingar	Comm	Westmeath		18,416	20,103	9.2	11.4	1757.3
Greystones	Comm (Note: "Greystones-Delgany" was scheduled in 1963; Greystones gained municipal commissioners in 1984.)	Wicklow		14,569	17,468	19.9	10	1748.5
Balbriggan	Comm	Dublin (Fingal)		15,559	19,960	28.3	6.6	3006
Leixlip	Comm	Kildare		14,676	15,452	5.3	6.5	2373.6
Tramore	Comm	Waterford		9,634	10,328	7.2	7.2	1444.5
Shannon	Comm	Clare		9,222	9,673	4.9	8.6	1124.8
Gorey	Comm	Wexford		7,193	9,114	26.7	4.6	1985.6
Tuam	Comm	Galway		6,885	8,242	19.7	6.6	1248.8
Edenderry	Comm	Offaly		5,888	6,977	18.5	8.7	806.6
Bandon	Comm	Cork		5,822	6,640	14.1	4.9	1366.3
Passage West	Comm	Cork		5,203	5,790	11.3	4.7	1221.5
Loughrea	Comm	Galway		4,532	5,062	11.7	4.3	1191.1
Ardee	Comm	Louth		4,694	4,927	5	6.8	725.6
Mountmellick	Comm	Laois		4,069	4,735	16.4	3.8	1256
Bantry	Comm	Cork		3,309	3,348	1.2	10	334.8
Muine Bheag (Muinebeag, Bagenalstown)	Comm	Carlow		2,735	2,950	7.9	3.5	847.7
Boyle	Comm	Roscommon		2,522	2,588	2.6	5.4	478.4
Ballyshannon	Comm	Donegal		2,686	2,503	-6.8	5.2	481.3
Cootehill	Comm	Cavan		1,892	2,123	12.2	2.9	742.3
Ballybay	Comm	Monaghan		1,217	1,461	20	—	—
Belturbet	Comm	Cavan		1,411	1,407	-0.3	—	—
Lismore	Comm	Waterford		1,240	1,369	10.4	—	—
Kilkee	Comm	Clare		1,325	1,139	-14	—	—
Granard	Comm	Longford		933	1,021	9.4	—	—
Swords	(Sched)	Dublin (Fingal)		33,998	36,924	8.6	10.2	3616.5
Celbridge	(Sched)	Kildare		17,262	19,537	13.2	5.9	3334
Malahide	(Sched)	Dublin (Fingal)		14,937	15,846	6.1	5.8	2732.1
Maynooth	(Sched)	Kildare		10,715	12,510	16.8	5.1	2433.9
Skerries	(Sched)	Dublin (Fingal)		9,535	9,671	1.4	3.2	3041.2
Rush	(Sched)	Dublin (Fingal)		8,286	9,231	11.4	5.8	1580.7
Kildare	(Sched)	Kildare		7,538	8,142	8	3.1	2626.5
Portarlington	(Sched)	Laois	Offaly	6,004	7,788	29.7	4.2	1841.1
Roscrea	(Sched)	Tipperary		4,910	5,403	10	6.1	888.7
Ballybofey–Stranorlar	(Sched (Note: Only Ballybofey is scheduled))	Donegal		4,176	4,852	16.2	5.2	931.3
Carrick-on-Shannon	(Sched)	Leitrim	Roscommon	3,163	3,980	25.8	3.9	1031.1
Tullow	(Sched)	Carlow		3,048	3,972	30.3	4.4	898.6
Athenry	(Sched)	Galway		3,205	3,950	23.2	2.7	1441.6
Monasterevin (Monasterevan)	(Sched)	Kildare		3,017	3,710	23	3.4	1081.6
Mitchelstown	(Sched)	Cork		3,365	3,677	9.3	2.8	1299.3
Charleville (Rathluirc)	(Sched)	Cork	Limerick	2,984	3,672	23.1	3.1	1188.3
Cahir	(Sched)	Tipperary		3,381	3,578	5.8	2.7	1350.2
Claremorris	(Sched)	Mayo		2,595	3,412	31.5	3.3	1033.9
Clara	(Sched)	Offaly		3,001	3,242	8	3.9	835.6
Moate	(Sched)	Westmeath		1,888	2,731	44.7	1.9	1407.7
Ballinrobe	(Sched)	Mayo		2,098	2,704	28.9	2.6	1056.3
Gort	(Sched)	Galway		2,734	2,644	-3.3	3.4	768.6
Donegal	(Sched)	Donegal		2,339	2,607	11.5	2.9	886.7
Carndonagh	(Sched)	Donegal		1,923	2,534	31.8	4.9	518.2
Bailieborough	(Sched)	Cavan		1,966	2,530	28.7	4.1	621.6
Castleisland	(Sched)	Kerry		2,300	2,513	9.3	3.4	741.3
Blarney	(Sched)	Cork		2,400	2,437	1.5	1.9	1317.3
Ballyhaunis	(Sched)	Mayo		1,708	2,312	35.4	2.4	947.5
Thomastown	(Sched)	Kilkenny		1,837	2,273	23.7	3.3	686.7
Kanturk	(Sched)	Cork		1,915	2,263	18.2	3.1	725.3
Kenmare	(Sched)	Kerry		1,701	2,175	27.9	3.1	703.9
Killorglin	(Sched)	Kerry		1,627	2,082	28	2.3	897.4
Clifden	(Sched)	Galway		1,497	2,056	37.3	2.4	867.5
Abbeyfeale	(Sched)	Limerick		1,940	2,007	3.5	1.9	1061.9
Castlerea	(Sched)	Roscommon		1,873	1,985	6	2.3	866.8
Dingle (An Daingean)	(Sched)	Kerry		1,920	1,965	2.3	3.3	595.5
Abbeyleix	(Sched)	Laois		1,568	1,827	16.5	3.2	565.6
Ballaghaderreen	(Sched)	Roscommon		1,720	1,822	5.9	2.1	859.4
Portlaw	(Sched)	Waterford		1,495	1,696	13.4	1	1730.6
Mountrath	(Sched)	Laois		1,435	1,661	15.7	1.7	960.1
Banagher	(Sched)	Offaly		1,636	1,653	1	1.8	918.3
Kilmallock	(Sched)	Limerick		1,443	1,635	13.3	2	809.4
Rathdrum	(Sched)	Wicklow		1,405	1,586	12.9	1.2	1300
Dunmanway	(Sched)	Cork		1,522	1,585	4.1	1.8	870.9
Millstreet	(Sched)	Cork		1,401	1,574	12.3	2	771.6
Graiguenamanagh–Tinnahinch (Graignamanagh)	(Sched)	Kilkenny	Carlow	1,376	1,543	12.1	1.5	1008.5
Moville	(Sched)	Donegal		1,427	1,481	3.8	—	—
Castlecomer–Donaguile	(Sched)	Kilkenny		1,531	1,456	-4.9	—	—
Swinford (Swineford)	(Sched)	Mayo		1,502	1,435	-4.5	—	—
Ballybunion	(Sched)	Kerry		1,365	1,354	-0.8	—	—
Killybegs	(Sched)	Donegal		1,280	1,297	1.3	—	—
Cahersiveen (Caherciveen, Cahirciveen, Cahirsiveen)	(Sched)	Kerry		1,294	1,168	-9.7	—	—
Ennistymon	(Sched)	Clare		813	957	17.7	—	—
Carrigaline	—	Cork		12,835	14,775	15.1	4.4	3350.3
Ashbourne	—	Meath		8,528	11,355	33.1	3.3	3440.9
Laytown–Bettystown–Mornington	—	Meath		8,978	10,889	21.3	5.6	1930.7
Portmarnock	—	Dublin (Fingal)		8,979	9,285	3.4	3.7	2543.8
Ratoath	—	Meath		7,249	9,043	24.7	2.9	3086.3
Lusk	—	Dublin (Fingal)		5,236	7,022	34.1	1.9	3657.3
Dunboyne	—	Meath		5,713	6,959	21.8	2	3411.3
Donabate	—	Dublin (Fingal)		5,499	6,778	23.3	1.9	3548.7
Clane	—	Kildare		4,968	6,702	34.9	2.9	2303.1
Newcastle West	—	Limerick		5,098	6,327	24.1	4.7	1360.6
Kinsealy–Drinan	—	Dublin (Fingal)		3,651	5,814	59.2	1.1	5100
Roscommon	—	Roscommon		5,017	5,693	13.5	9.1	624.9
Kilcock (Killcock)	—	Kildare		4,100	5,533	35	1.8	3091.1
Sallins	—	Kildare		3,806	5,283	38.8	1.5	3593.9
Blessington	—	Wicklow	Kildare	4,018	5,010	24.7	1.8	2862.9
Oranmore	—	Galway		3,513	4,799	36.6	2.5	1950.8
Carrigtwohill (Carrigtohill)	—	Cork		2,782	4,551	63.6	1.5	2955.2
Kilcoole	—	Wicklow		3,252	4,049	24.5	2.4	1701.3
Duleek	—	Meath		3,236	3,988	23.2	1.8	2203.3
Dunshaughlin	—	Meath		3,384	3,903	15.3	1.8	2192.7
Kilcullen	—	Kildare		2,985	3,473	16.3	1.9	1837.6
Rathcoole	—	Dublin (South Dublin)		2,927	3,421	16.9	1.4	2479
Tower	—	Cork		3,102	3,306	6.6	2	1678.2
Stamullen	—	Meath		2,487	3,130	25.9	0.9	3365.6
Kill	—	Kildare		2,510	3,095	23.3	1.1	2813.6
Rathnew	—	Wicklow		1,849	2,964	60.3	1.2	2577.4
Enfield	—	Meath		2,161	2,929	35.5	1.3	2270.5
Courtown Harbour (Courtown, Ballinatray)	—	Wexford		1,421	2,857	101.1	3.1	936.7
Annacotty	—	Limerick		1,839	2,856	55.3	1.6	1807.6
Kinnegad	—	Westmeath		2,245	2,662	18.6	1	2662
Newcastle	—	Dublin (South Dublin)		1,506	2,659	76.6	2.1	1248.4
Ballyjamesduff	—	Cavan		1,690	2,568	52	1.7	1519.5
Sixmilebridge	—	Clare		1,659	2,507	51.1	1.2	2038.2
Ballina	—	Tipperary		1,861	2,442	31.2	2	1227.1
Newtownmountkennedy	—	Wicklow		2,548	2,410	-5.4	1.8	1316.9
Athboy	—	Meath		2,213	2,397	8.3	1.4	1762.5
Rathangan	—	Kildare		1,718	2,374	38.2	2.6	916.6
Callan	—	Kilkenny		1,771	2,330	31.6	2.1	1120.2
Kingscourt	—	Cavan		1,748	2,326	33.1	1.7	1392.8
Virginia	—	Cavan		1,734	2,282	31.6	2	1146.7
Prosperous	—	Kildare		1,939	2,248	15.9	1.4	1640.9
Saggart	—	Dublin (South Dublin)		868	2,144	147	1	2233.3
Crosshaven	—	Cork		1,669	2,093	25.4	1.6	1308.1
Baltinglass	—	Wicklow		1,735	2,061	18.8	2.7	771.9
Bunclody–Carrickduff	—	Wexford	Carlow	1,863	2,012	8	1.8	1124
Clogherhead	—	Louth		1,558	1,993	27.9	1.5	1365.1
Castleconnell	—	Limerick		1,330	1,917	44.1	1.5	1278
Bearna	—	Galway		—	1,878	—	1.9	993.7
Balrothery	—	Dublin (Fingal)		—	1,866	—	0.5	3520.8
Enniskerry	—	Wicklow		1,881	1,811	-3.7	1.9	968.4
Newport	—	Tipperary		1,286	1,806	40.4	1.5	1220.3
Dunleer	—	Louth		1,449	1,786	23.3	1.6	1144.9
Newmarket-on-Fergus	—	Clare		1,542	1,773	15	1.6	1115.1
Tubbercurry (Tobercurry)	—	Sligo		1,421	1,747	22.9	2.3	773
Edgeworthstown (Meathas Truim, Mostrim)	—	Longford		1,221	1,744	42.8	1.4	1273
Ballivor	—	Meath		1,212	1,727	42.5	1	1762.2
Castlebridge	—	Wexford		1,624	1,726	6.3	2	863
Lifford	—	Donegal		1,448	1,658	14.5	1.2	1405.1
Strandhill (Larass)	—	Sligo		1,413	1,596	13	1.1	1400
Ballymahon	—	Longford		963	1,563	62.3	1.6	958.9
Cloyne	—	Cork		1,095	1,562	42.6	0.9	1661.7
Dunmore East	—	Waterford		1,547	1,559	0.8	2	787.4
Moycullen (Maigh Cuilinn)	—	Galway		1,237	1,559	26	1.4	1138
Bunbeg–Derrybeg (An Bun Beag–Doirí Beaga)	—	Donegal		1,359	1,553	14.3	7.9	195.6
Rathkeale	—	Limerick		1,494	1,550	3.7	6.4	242.6
Rosslare Strand (Rosslare)	—	Wexford		1,359	1,547	13.8	2.4	634
Derrinturn	—	Kildare		1,138	1,541	35.4	1.5	1020.5
Fethard	—	Tipperary		1,374	1,541	12.2	1.5	1013.8
Ballymote	—	Sligo		1,229	1,539	25.2	1.6	961.9
Rathcormac	—	Cork		1,072	1,534	43.1	0.9	1804.7
Portumna	—	Galway		1,377	1,530	11.1	1.5	993.5
Rochfortbridge	—	Westmeath		1,473	1,494	1.4	—	—
Ashford	—	Wicklow		1,349	1,449	7.4	—	—
Termonfeckin	—	Louth		653	1,443	121	—	—
Convoy	—	Donegal		1,193	1,438	20.5	—	—
Ardnacrusha (Castlebank)	—	Clare		1,169	1,414	21	—	—
Castledermot	—	Kildare		887	1,398	57.6	—	—
Oldcastle	—	Meath		1,316	1,384	5.2	—	—
Longwood	—	Meath		877	1,378	57.1	—	—
Lanesborough–Ballyleague	—	Longford	Roscommon	1,112	1,377	23.8	—	—
Portrane	—	Dublin (Fingal)		1,532	1,372	-10.4	—	—
Collooney (Coloony)	—	Sligo		892	1,369	53.5	—	—
Aughrim	—	Wicklow		1,145	1,364	19.1	—	—
Ferns	—	Wexford		954	1,362	42.8	—	—
Tullyallen	—	Louth		1,036	1,358	31.1	—	—
Slane	—	Meath		1,099	1,349	22.7	—	—
Ballisodare	—	Sligo		971	1,344	38.4	—	—
Manorhamilton	—	Leitrim		1,158	1,336	15.4	—	—
Oughterard	—	Galway		1,305	1,333	2.1	—	—
Foxford	—	Mayo		1,058	1,326	25.3	—	—
Killaloe	—	Clare		1,035	1,292	24.8	—	—
Kilpedder	—	Wicklow		480	1,287	168.1	—	—
Caherconlish	—	Limerick		700	1,279	82.7	—	—
Castlemartyr	—	Cork		978	1,277	30.6	—	—
Muff	—	Donegal		947	1,271	34.2	—	—
Murroe (Moroe)	—	Limerick		624	1,271	103.7	—	—
Killucan and Rathwire	—	Westmeath		812	1,226	51	—	—
Enniscrone (Inniscrone, Inishcrone)	—	Sligo		829	1,223	47.5	—	—
Claregalway (Baile Chláir)	—	Galway		741	1,217	64.2	—	—
Ramelton	—	Donegal		1,088	1,212	11.4	—	—
Rathdowney (Rathdowny)	—	Laois		1,212	1,208	-0.3	—	—
Kilbeggan	—	Westmeath		822	1,199	45.9	—	—
Piltown	—	Kilkenny		968	1,187	22.6	—	—
Dungloe (An Clochán Liath)	—	Donegal		1,068	1,183	10.8	—	—
Mooncoin	—	Kilkenny		1,002	1,166	16.4	—	—
Ferbane	—	Offaly		1,164	1,165	0.1	—	—
Watergrasshill	—	Cork		860	1,161	35	—	—
Croom	—	Limerick		1,045	1,157	10.7	—	—
Raphoe	—	Donegal		1,065	1,157	8.6	—	—
Stradbally	—	Laois		1,056	1,154	9.3	—	—
Askeaton	—	Limerick		979	1,149	17.4	—	—
Mullagh	—	Cavan		679	1,137	67.5	—	—
Kiltimagh	—	Mayo		1,096	1,127	2.8	—	—
Rosslare Harbour (or Ballygeary)	—	Wexford		1,041	1,123	7.9	—	—
Dromiskin	—	Louth		992	1,115	12.4	—	—
Adare	—	Limerick		982	1,106	12.6	—	—
Kentstown	—	Meath		912	1,099	20.5	—	—
Ballinroad	—	Waterford		794	1,097	38.2	—	—
Carnew	—	Wicklow		949	1,091	15	—	—
Ballyragget	—	Kilkenny		1,014	1,089	7.4	—	—
Belmullet (Béal an Mhuirthead)	—	Mayo		1,074	1,089	1.4	—	—
Ballylinan	—	Laois		754	1,084	43.8	—	—
Newtown Cunningham (Newtowncunningham)	—	Donegal		999	1,067	6.8	—	—
Whitegate	—	Cork		765	1,067	39.5	—	—
Ballyconnell	—	Cavan		747	1,061	42	—	—
Crossmolina	—	Mayo		930	1,061	14.1	—	—
Killumney (Killumny)	—	Cork		809	1,046	29.3	—	—
Carlingford	—	Louth		623	1,045	67.7	—	—
Castlepollard	—	Westmeath		1,004	1,042	3.8	—	—
Daingean (Philipstown)	—	Offaly		1,056	1,037	-1.8	—	—
Castlebellingham–Kilsaran	—	Louth		816	1,035	26.8	—	—
Kilmacanogue (Kilmacanoge)	—	Wicklow		839	1,028	22.5	—	—
Kinlough	—	Leitrim		690	1,018	47.5	—	—
Athgarvan	—	Kildare		—	1,016	—	—	—
Aghada–Farsid–Rostellan	—	Cork		904	1,015	12.3	—	—
Johnstown	—	Kildare		899	1,004	11.7	—	—
Kilmeague (Kilmeage)	—	Kildare		683	997	46	—	—
Newmarket	—	Cork		949	988	4.1	—	—
Kilworth	—	Cork		645	974	51	—	—
Urlingford	—	Kilkenny		867	973	12.2	—	—
Milford	—	Donegal		829	970	17	—	—
Tinahely	—	Wicklow		965	970	0.5	—	—
Borrisokane	—	Tipperary		832	964	15.9	—	—
Tallow	—	Waterford		911	962	5.6	—	—
Newcastle	—	Wicklow		837	951	13.6	—	—
Ardfinnan	—	Tipperary		747	946	26.6	—	—
Buttevant	—	Cork		914	945	3.4	—	—
Quin	—	Clare		565	935	65.5	—	—
Mohill	—	Leitrim		931	928	-0.3	—	—
Charlestown–Bellahy	—	Mayo	Sligo	859	914	6.4	—	—
Castletownbere	—	Cork		868	912	5.1	—	—
Fountainstown	—	Cork		887	894	0.8	—	—
Ballinamore	—	Leitrim		805	889	10.4	—	—
Headford	—	Galway		760	889	17	—	—
Caragh (Carragh)	—	Kildare		751	882	17.4	—	—
Rathvilly	—	Carlow		796	881	10.7	—	—
Ballymore Eustace	—	Kildare		725	872	20.3	—	—
Dromahane (Drommahane)	—	Cork		801	872	8.9	—	—
Kilmacthomas (Kilmactomas)	—	Waterford		783	871	11.2	—	—
Kilcormac (Frankford)	—	Offaly		847	870	2.7	—	—
Glenties	—	Donegal		811	869	7.2	—	—
Coolaney	—	Sligo		208	866	316.3	—	—
Falcarragh (An Fál Carrach)	—	Donegal		842	860	2.1	—	—
Drumshanbo	—	Leitrim		665	857	28.9	—	—
Brownstown	—	Kildare		482	846	75.5	—	—
Allenwood	—	Kildare		667	845	26.7	—	—
Durrow	—	Laois		811	843	3.9	—	—
Patrickswell	—	Limerick		924	841	-9	—	—
Milltown	—	Kerry		415	838	101.9	—	—
Drumlish	—	Longford		429	835	94.6	—	—
Roundwood	—	Wicklow		589	833	41.4	—	—
Summerhill	—	Meath		799	832	4.1	—	—
Dunlavin	—	Wicklow		849	830	-2.2	—	—
Leighlinbridge	—	Carlow		674	828	22.8	—	—
Rosses Point	—	Sligo		872	824	-5.5	—	—
Greencastle	—	Donegal		530	817	54.2	—	—
Scarriff (Scariff)	—	Clare		798	816	2.3	—	—
Carraroe (An Cheathrú Rua)	—	Galway		627	814	29.8	—	—
Collon	—	Louth		564	814	44.3	—	—
Strokestown	—	Roscommon		773	814	5.3	—	—
Knock	—	Mayo		745	811	8.9	—	—
Mucklagh	—	Offaly		708	810	14.4	—	—
Kilsheelan	—	Tipperary		520	809	55.6	—	—
Ballyclerahan	—	Tipperary		678	807	19	—	—
Passage East	—	Waterford		644	806	25.2	—	—
Ardfert	—	Kerry		729	800	9.7	—	—
Paulstown	—	Kilkenny		598	791	32.3	—	—
Castlefin	—	Donegal		810	787	-2.8	—	—
Mountbellew (Mount Bellew)	—	Galway		746	784	5.1	—	—
Bruff	—	Limerick		724	783	8.1	—	—
Kilfinane	—	Limerick		727	778	7	—	—
Rathmore	—	Kerry		611	778	27.3	—	—
Rhode	—	Offaly		778	778	0	—	—
Milltown Malbay (Miltown Malbay)	—	Clare		570	777	36.3	—	—
Innishannon (Inishannon)	—	Cork		678	767	13.1	—	—
Ballinagh	—	Cavan		675	766	13.5	—	—
Belgooly	—	Cork		535	765	43	—	—
Moneenroe	—	Kilkenny		688	761	10.6	—	—
Cappoquin	—	Waterford		740	759	2.6	—	—
Newtownforbes	—	Longford		668	759	13.6	—	—
Doneraile	—	Cork		759	757	-0.3	—	—
Avoca	—	Wicklow		734	753	2.6	—	—
Dromahair	—	Leitrim		503	748	48.7	—	—
Gowran	—	Kilkenny		487	742	52.4	—	—
Lisdoonvarna	—	Clare		767	739	-3.7	—	—
Suncroft	—	Kildare		607	735	21.1	—	—
Ardara	—	Donegal		564	731	29.6	—	—
Bennettsbridge	—	Kilkenny		685	729	6.4	—	—
Killeagh	—	Cork		521	721	38.4	—	—
Louth	—	Louth		549	715	30.2	—	—
Holycross	—	Tipperary		700	714	2	—	—
Killenaule	—	Tipperary		597	713	19.4	—	—
Borrisoleigh	—	Tipperary		626	708	13.1	—	—
Ballineen and Enniskean	—	Cork		646	700	8.4	—	—
Delvin	—	Westmeath		416	697	67.5	—	—
Emyvale	—	Monaghan		683	696	1.9	—	—
Coill Dubh (Blackwood)	—	Kildare		684	693	1.3	—	—
Donore	—	Meath		728	692	-4.9	—	—
Corofin	—	Clare		485	689	42.1	—	—
Ballytore	—	Kildare		445	685	53.9	—	—
Freshford	—	Kilkenny		734	685	-6.7	—	—
Kilmacrennan (Kilmacrennan)	—	Donegal		575	685	19.1	—	—
Ballon	—	Carlow		596	684	14.8	—	—
Cappamore	—	Limerick		669	675	0.9	—	—
Cratloe	—	Clare		643	674	4.8	—	—
Tallanstown	—	Louth		653	673	3.1	—	—
Balla	—	Mayo		586	671	14.5	—	—
Glenealy	—	Wicklow		528	670	26.9	—	—
Loughshinny	—	Dublin (Fingal)		641	670	4.5	—	—
Robertstown	—	Kildare		621	669	7.7	—	—
Craughwell	—	Galway		414	665	60.6	—	—
Pallaskenry	—	Limerick		534	664	24.3	—	—
Kildalkey (Kildalky)	—	Meath		518	663	28	—	—
Tulla	—	Clare		645	662	2.6	—	—
Ballygar	—	Galway		689	660	-4.2	—	—
Schull (Skull)	—	Cork		576	658	14.2	—	—
Kilmuckridge (Ford)	—	Wexford		467	654	40	—	—
Johnstownbridge	—	Kildare		535	650	21.5	—	—
Calverstown	—	Kildare		650	648	-0.3	—	—
Ballycannan	—	Clare		651	646	-0.8	—	—
Borris	—	Carlow		582	646	11	—	—
Manorcunningham (Manor)	—	Donegal		414	643	55.3	—	—
Lahinch	—	Clare		607	642	5.8	—	—
Straffan	—	Kildare		439	635	44.6	—	—
Clonmellon	—	Westmeath		547	634	15.9	—	—
Lixnaw	—	Kerry		431	634	47.1	—	—
Shinrone	—	Offaly		591	634	7.3	—	—
Carlanstown	—	Meath		348	631	81.3	—	—
Clonee (Clonee Village)	—	Meath		1,000	631	-36.9	—	—
Hospital	—	Limerick		628	630	0.3	—	—
Ballyheigue	—	Kerry		677	628	-7.2	—	—
Clonlara (Cloonlara)	—	Clare		504	627	24.4	—	—
Kilmacow (Killmacow)	—	Kilkenny		526	627	19.2	—	—
Taghmon	—	Wexford		674	623	-7.6	—	—
Killenard	—	Laois		—	622	—	—	—
Ballyhaise	—	Cavan		597	620	3.9	—	—
Kinvara	—	Galway		563	620	10.1	—	—
Julianstown–Whitecross	—	Meath		615	616	0.2	—	—
Newport	—	Mayo		590	616	4.4	—	—
Elphin	—	Roscommon		591	613	3.7	—	—
Cloghan	—	Offaly		503	612	21.7	—	—
Killygordon (Killygordan)	—	Donegal		357	608	70.3	—	—
Hacketstown	—	Carlow		606	600	-1	—	—
Kilrane	—	Wexford		432	594	37.5	—	—
Riverstick	—	Cork		—	592	—	—	—
Pallasgreen (Pallas Grean)	—	Limerick		359	589	64.1	—	—
Kilmessan	—	Meath		341	586	71.8	—	—
Knockbridge	—	Louth		427	583	36.5	—	—
St Johnston	—	Donegal		479	583	21.7	—	—
Keel–Dooagh	—	Mayo		561	582	3.7	—	—
Kildrum	—	Donegal		542	581	7.2	—	—
Grange	—	Sligo		383	578	50.9	—	—
Dunmore	—	Galway		614	577	-6	—	—
Glin	—	Limerick		566	577	1.9	—	—
Killala	—	Mayo		569	574	0.9	—	—
Whitechurch	—	Cork		408	573	40.4	—	—
Fahan	—	Donegal		417	569	36.5	—	—
Grenagh	—	Cork		—	562	—	—	—
Aherla (Rathard)	—	Cork		389	560	44	—	—
Piercetown (Piercestown)	—	Wexford		528	555	5.1	—	—
Tarbert	—	Kerry		550	551	0.2	—	—
Corofin (Corrofin)	—	Galway		380	549	44.5	—	—
Dromcolliher (Drumcollogher)	—	Limerick		524	548	4.6	—	—
Two-Mile Borris (Twomileborris)	—	Tipperary		550	548	-0.4	—	—
Glanworth	—	Cork		432	547	26.6	—	—
Rivermeade	—	Dublin (Fingal)		615	543	-11.7	—	—
Foynes	—	Limerick		606	542	-10.6	—	—
Bruree	—	Limerick		321	541	68.5	—	—
Ballygarvan	—	Cork		457	540	18.2	—	—
Rosscarbery (Roscarbery)	—	Cork		507	534	5.3	—	—
Ballyduff	—	Kerry		578	532	-8	—	—
Shercock	—	Cavan		461	531	15.2	—	—
Ballingarry	—	Limerick		441	527	19.5	—	—
Fenit	—	Kerry		435	527	21.1	—	—
Roosky (Rooskey)	—	Roscommon	Leitrim	329	523	59	—	—
Courtmacsherry	—	Cork		244	520	113.1	—	—
Kilkishen	—	Clare		443	520	17.4	—	—
Clonaslee	—	Laois		501	518	3.4	—	—
Rathmullan (Rathmullen)	—	Donegal		469	518	10.4	—	—
Cloughjordan (Cloghjordan)	—	Tipperary		394	511	29.7	—	—
Churchtown	—	Cork		217	509	134.6	—	—
Doon	—	Limerick		439	509	15.9	—	—
Tyrrellspass	—	Westmeath		493	506	2.6	—	—
Lackaghbeg (Lackagh, Lacagh)	—	Galway		446	504	13	—	—
Moylough	—	Galway		357	503	40.9	—	—
Omeath	—	Louth		439	503	14.6	—	—
Ballycanew	—	Wexford		464	502	8.2	—	—
Glenamaddy	—	Galway		502	500	-0.4	—	—
Gormanston	—	Meath		355	500	40.8	—	—
Ring (An Rinn)	—	Waterford		384	500	30.2	—	—
Carrignavar	—	Cork		482	499	3.5	—	—
Slieverue (Slieveroe)	—	Kilkenny		484	499	3.1	—	—
Keenagh (Kenagh)	—	Longford		241	498	106.6	—	—
Bridgend (Bridge End)	—	Donegal		334	497	48.8	—	—
Clogheen	—	Tipperary		509	491	-3.5	—	—
Firies (Fieries)	—	Kerry		—	491	—	—	—
Leitrim	—	Leitrim		258	485	88	—	—
Cliffoney	—	Sligo		425	483	13.6	—	—
Mullinahone	—	Tipperary		372	481	29.3	—	—
Ballyoulster	—	Kildare		895	480	-46.4	—	—
Ringaskiddy (Loughbeg)	—	Cork		514	478	-7	—	—
The Ballagh	—	Wexford		—	477	—	—	—
Ballycotton	—	Cork		412	476	15.5	—	—
Borris-in-Ossory	—	Laois		488	475	-2.7	—	—
Bellanode	—	Monaghan		400	473	18.3	—	—
Johnstown	—	Kilkenny		445	472	6.1	—	—
Clonmany	—	Donegal		437	470	7.6	—	—
Conna	—	Cork		376	470	25	—	—
Drimoleague	—	Cork		436	468	7.3	—	—
Mountcharles	—	Donegal		497	468	-5.8	—	—
Portroe	—	Tipperary		454	468	3.1	—	—
Crusheen	—	Clare		377	467	23.9	—	—
Burnfoot	—	Donegal		398	466	17.1	—	—
Grahormac (Tagoat)	—	Wexford		309	466	50.8	—	—
Waterville–Spunkane	—	Kerry		546	465	-14.8	—	—
Ballymurn	—	Wexford		—	464	—	—	—
Ballyliffin	—	Donegal		357	461	29.1	—	—
Barntown	—	Wexford		394	461	17	—	—
Spa	—	Kerry		417	460	10.3	—	—
Coolagary (Walsh Island)	—	Offaly		365	458	25.5	—	—
Tinure	—	Louth		387	456	17.8	—	—
Ballyroan	—	Laois		189	455	140.7	—	—
Glen (Ballyneety)	—	Limerick		420	455	8.3	—	—
Oldtown	—	Dublin (Fingal)		220	455	106.8	—	—
Ladytown	—	Kildare		358	452	26.3	—	—
Naul	—	Dublin (Fingal)		196	445	127	—	—
Ballincar	—	Sligo		526	444	-15.6	—	—
Knockglass	—	Cork		288	443	53.8	—	—
Meenlaragh (Mín Lárach)	—	Donegal		372	442	18.8	—	—
Gweedore (Bun na Leaca)	—	Donegal		392	441	12.5	—	—
Ardmore	—	Waterford		412	435	5.6	—	—
Ballinakill	—	Laois		430	435	1.2	—	—
Castletownroche	—	Cork		398	435	9.3	—	—
Ballymore	—	Westmeath		289	433	49.8	—	—
Garristown	—	Dublin (Fingal)		257	433	68.5	—	—
Dromod (Drumod)	—	Leitrim		210	432	105.7	—	—
Coachford	—	Cork		439	431	-1.8	—	—
Kilmihil (Kilmihill)	—	Clare		362	426	17.7	—	—
Ballymakeera (Baile Mhic Íre)	—	Cork		413	425	2.9	—	—
Clonbulloge (Clonbullogue)	—	Offaly		442	422	-4.5	—	—
Louisburgh	—	Mayo		314	422	34.4	—	—
Ballinagar	—	Offaly		381	420	10.2	—	—
Frenchpark	—	Roscommon		454	420	-7.5	—	—
Stradbally	—	Waterford		391	420	7.4	—	—
Ballylongford	—	Kerry		406	418	3	—	—
Bweeng	—	Cork		—	418	—	—	—
Castletown	—	Laois		314	418	33.1	—	—
Shrule	—	Mayo		425	418	-1.6	—	—
Tinryland (Tinriland)	—	Carlow		243	418	72	—	—
Crocknamurleog (Cnoc na Muirleog)	—	Donegal		346	415	19.9	—	—
Shanagarry	—	Cork		297	414	39.4	—	—
Abbeydorney	—	Kerry		244	412	68.9	—	—
Ballyhooly	—	Cork		215	412	91.6	—	—
Campile	—	Wexford		347	411	18.4	—	—
Creeslough	—	Donegal		327	410	25.4	—	—
Littleton	—	Tipperary		463	410	-11.4	—	—
Kildimo	—	Limerick		—	409	—	—	—
Kilberry	—	Kildare		421	408	-3.1	—	—
Newtown	—	Cork		321	405	26.2	—	—
Moyvane (Newtownsandes)	—	Kerry		387	401	3.6	—	—
Kilmore Quay	—	Wexford		396	400	1	—	—
Camolin	—	Wexford		390	393	0.8	—	—
Ballinabrannagh	—	Carlow		—	389	—	—	—
Clarinbridge	—	Galway		257	389	51.4	—	—
Nurney	—	Kildare		354	389	9.9	—	—
Carrowkeel	—	Donegal		331	388	17.2	—	—
Athea	—	Limerick		377	385	2.1	—	—
Bridgetown	—	Wexford		202	385	90.6	—	—
Oylegate (Oilgate)	—	Wexford		324	385	18.8	—	—
Carrigallen	—	Leitrim		303	384	26.7	—	—
Fennagh	—	Carlow		—	384	—	—	—
Kilnaleck	—	Cavan		334	384	15	—	—
O'Brien's Bridge–Montpelier (O'Briensbridge)	—	Clare	Limerick	378	383	1.3	—	—
Cloonboo (Cluain Bú)	—	Galway		306	381	24.5	—	—
Arvagh (Arva)	—	Cavan		364	380	4.4	—	—
Kildysart (Killadysert)	—	Clare		311	378	21.5	—	—
Multyfarnham (Multyfarnam)	—	Westmeath		193	376	94.8	—	—
Dunkineely	—	Donegal		363	375	3.3	—	—
Geashill	—	Offaly		328	375	14.3	—	—
Riverstown	—	Sligo		310	374	20.6	—	—
Saleen	—	Cork		—	374	—	—	—
Timoleague	—	Cork		365	373	2.2	—	—
Kilkelly	—	Mayo		389	372	-4.4	—	—
Coolgreany	—	Wexford		360	370	2.8	—	—
Drumconrath (Drumcondra)	—	Meath		405	370	-8.6	—	—
Scotstown	—	Monaghan		250	370	48	—	—
Cappawhite	—	Tipperary		328	369	12.5	—	—
Kilcummin	—	Kerry		—	368	—	—	—
Fiddown	—	Kilkenny		194	366	88.7	—	—
Milltown	—	Kildare		242	365	50.8	—	—
Killeshandra (Killashandra)	—	Cavan		411	364	-11.4	—	—
Balbradagh	—	Meath		257	363	41.2	—	—
Murrintown (Murntown)	—	Wexford		347	363	4.6	—	—
Smithborough (Smithboro)	—	Monaghan		309	363	17.5	—	—
Goresbridge	—	Kilkenny		376	361	-4	—	—
Kinnitty	—	Offaly		333	359	7.8	—	—
Clogh–Chatsworth	—	Kilkenny		351	358	2	—	—
Nobber	—	Meath		233	357	53.2	—	—
Lawcus (Stoneyford)	—	Kilkenny		342	355	3.8	—	—
Crossbarry	—	Cork		—	354	—	—	—
Ballyboghil	—	Dublin (Fingal)		321	352	9.7	—	—
Ranafast (Rann na Feirste, Rannafast, Rinnafarset)	—	Donegal		319	352	10.3	—	—
Palatine	—	Carlow		—	351	—	—	—
Tievebane	—	Donegal		235	351	49.4	—	—
Ballindine	—	Mayo		249	350	40.6	—	—
Cloughduv (Cloghduff)	—	Cork		349	350	0.3	—	—
Bansha	—	Tipperary		272	349	28.3	—	—
Carney	—	Sligo		219	349	59.4	—	—
Gorteen (Gurteen)	—	Sligo		269	349	29.7	—	—
Emly (Emlybeg)	—	Tipperary		293	348	18.8	—	—
Glaslough (Glasslough)	—	Monaghan		290	348	20	—	—
Baltimore	—	Cork		377	347	-8	—	—
Dripsey (Model Village)	—	Cork		304	345	13.5	—	—
Narraghmore	—	Kildare		—	345	—	—	—
Aglish	—	Waterford		169	343	103	—	—
Knockraha	—	Cork		230	341	48.3	—	—
Shillelagh	—	Wicklow		311	341	9.6	—	—
Laragh	—	Wicklow		378	340	-10.1	—	—
Clonard	—	Meath		347	339	-2.3	—	—
Loch an Iúir (Loughanure)	—	Donegal		307	337	9.8	—	—
Shanbally	—	Cork		—	337	—	—	—
Carrigans	—	Donegal		191	336	75.9	—	—
Collinstown	—	Westmeath		294	336	14.3	—	—
Farran	—	Cork		338	335	-0.9	—	—
Killimor	—	Galway		318	335	5.3	—	—
Cheekpoint	—	Waterford		313	334	6.7	—	—
Durrus	—	Cork		313	334	6.7	—	—
Ballysax	—	Kildare		270	333	23.3	—	—
Boherbue	—	Cork		378	333	-11.9	—	—
Clondulane	—	Cork		—	333	—	—	—
Ballybrittas	—	Laois		—	331	—	—	—
Ballylanders	—	Limerick		319	331	3.8	—	—
Newbliss	—	Monaghan		317	331	4.4	—	—
Clonroche	—	Wexford		356	329	-7.6	—	—
Duncannon	—	Wexford		291	328	12.7	—	—
Newcastle	—	Tipperary		245	328	33.9	—	—
Mogeely	—	Cork		—	327	—	—	—
Banteer	—	Cork		304	323	6.3	—	—
Burtonport (Ailt an Chorráin)	—	Donegal		270	323	19.6	—	—
Jenkinstown	—	Louth		237	323	36.3	—	—
Templetuohy	—	Tipperary		322	323	0.3	—	—
Churchbay (Note: As of the 2016 census, "Crosshaven - Churchbay" is a combined census town. See: "Census 2016 - Small Area Population Statistics (SAPMAP Area) - Settlements - Crosshaven-Church Bay". Census 2016. Central Statistics Office. Archived from the original on 19 August 2018.)	—	Cork		252	322	27.8	—	—
Ballygawley	—	Sligo		186	321	72.6	—	—
Fethard-on-Sea	—	Wexford		326	321	-1.5	—	—
Ballintogher	—	Sligo		182	313	72	—	—
Ballyporeen	—	Tipperary		304	313	3	—	—
Dunfanaghy	—	Donegal		316	312	-1.3	—	—
Kilmainham	—	Meath		330	312	-5.5	—	—
Ballysimon (Monageer)	—	Wexford		223	311	39.5	—	—
Oola	—	Limerick		386	311	-19.4	—	—
Toomevara (Toomyvara)	—	Tipperary		286	311	8.7	—	—
Moneygall	—	Offaly		298	310	4	—	—
Rockcorry	—	Monaghan		292	310	6.2	—	—
Ballinalee	—	Longford		151	308	104	—	—
Furbo (Furbogh, Na Forbacha)	—	Galway		175	308	76	—	—
Lissycasey	—	Clare		—	308	—	—	—
Knockcroghery	—	Roscommon		—	307	—	—	—
Danescastle (Carrig-on-Bannow)	—	Wexford		218	306	40.4	—	—
Gortnahoe (Gortnahoo)	—	Tipperary		219	304	38.8	—	—
Rathtoe	—	Carlow		—	303	—	—	—
Myshall	—	Carlow		200	302	51	—	—
Ballinaclash	—	Wicklow		—	301	—	—	—
Kildorrery	—	Cork		213	301	41.3	—	—
Ballinlough	—	Roscommon		262	300	14.5	—	—
Annascaul	—	Kerry		271	299	10.3	—	—
Kildangan	—	Kildare		—	299	—	—	—
Kilmeade	—	Kildare		138	299	116.7	—	—
Fedamore	—	Limerick		215	298	38.6	—	—
Rathmolyon	—	Meath		168	298	77.4	—	—
Ardskeagh (Broadford)	—	Clare		245	297	21.2	—	—
Kilronan (Cill Rónáin)	—	Galway		259	297	14.7	—	—
Monivea	—	Galway		337	296	-12.2	—	—
Newtown	—	Tipperary		191	296	55	—	—
Broadford	—	Limerick		313	295	-5.8	—	—
Rosscahill	—	Galway		240	295	22.9	—	—
Shanagolden	—	Limerick		292	294	0.7	—	—
Ballingarry	—	Tipperary		129	293	127.1	—	—
Bangor Erris	—	Mayo		295	293	-0.7	—	—
Castle Ellis	—	Wexford		173	293	69.4	—	—
Castlelyons	—	Cork		203	292	43.8	—	—
Kilmurry	—	Clare		278	291	4.7	—	—
Ardagh	—	Limerick		271	288	6.3	—	—
Silvermines	—	Tipperary		269	288	7.1	—	—
Ballynacargy	—	Westmeath		292	287	-1.7	—	—
Mungret	—	Limerick		252	286	13.5	—	—
Ballycullane	—	Wexford		219	285	30.1	—	—
Cloonfad	—	Roscommon		209	285	36.4	—	—
Crookstown	—	Cork		302	285	-5.6	—	—
Glenbeigh (Glenbei)	—	Kerry		280	285	1.8	—	—
Butlersbridge	—	Cavan		182	282	54.9	—	—
Carrick (An Charraig)	—	Donegal		253	282	11.5	—	—
Woodford	—	Galway		301	282	-6.3	—	—
Kells	—	Kilkenny		268	281	4.9	—	—
Kill	—	Waterford		194	281	44.8	—	—
Manor Kilbride	—	Wicklow		—	281	—	—	—
Clongeen	—	Wexford		217	280	29	—	—
Villierstown	—	Waterford		260	279	7.3	—	—
Clarina	—	Limerick		216	275	27.3	—	—
Puckane (Puckaun)	—	Tipperary		239	273	14.2	—	—
Doonbeg	—	Clare		228	272	19.3	—	—
Turlough	—	Mayo		—	272	—	—	—
Ballydehob	—	Cork		240	271	12.9	—	—
Dromina	—	Cork		213	269	26.3	—	—
Golden	—	Tipperary		255	269	5.5	—	—
Glencullen	—	Dublin (Dún Laoghaire–Rathdown)		189	268	41.8	—	—
Inniskeen (Inishkeen)	—	Monaghan		292	265	-9.2	—	—
Knocklong	—	Limerick		239	265	10.9	—	—
Ballyclogh	—	Cork		177	264	49.2	—	—
Causeway	—	Kerry		211	264	25.1	—	—
Culdaff	—	Donegal		155	264	70.3	—	—
Eyrecourt	—	Galway		292	264	-9.6	—	—
Kilcloon	—	Meath		281	264	-6	—	—
Ballyhogue	—	Wexford		—	262	—	—	—
Inistioge	—	Kilkenny		263	260	-1.1	—	—
Mullinavat	—	Kilkenny		255	259	1.6	—	—
Adamstown	—	Wexford		173	258	49.1	—	—
Ballyvaughan	—	Clare		224	258	15.2	—	—
Sneem	—	Kerry		279	258	-7.5	—	—
Killavullen	—	Cork		214	257	20.1	—	—
Oulart	—	Wexford		197	257	30.5	—	—
Gneeveguilla (Gneevgullia)	—	Kerry		233	256	9.9	—	—
Annagry (Anagaire)	—	Donegal		223	253	13.5	—	—
Clashmore	—	Waterford		224	252	12.5	—	—
Drumkeeran	—	Leitrim		249	252	1.2	—	—
Union Hall (Unionhall)	—	Cork		192	252	31.3	—	—
Milford	—	Cork		176	251	42.6	—	—
Pollagh (Pullough)	—	Offaly		229	251	9.6	—	—
Spiddal (An Spidéal)	—	Galway		247	250	1.2	—	—
Kilcar (Cill Charthaigh)	—	Donegal		232	248	6.9	—	—
Drumsna	—	Leitrim		217	247	13.8	—	—
Castlemagner	—	Cork		—	246	—	—	—
Newtown	—	Laois		222	246	10.8	—	—
Clonegal (Clonegall)	—	Carlow	Wexford	231	245	6.1	—	—
Easky	—	Sligo		240	245	2.1	—	—
Emo	—	Laois		225	245	8.9	—	—
Roundstone	—	Galway		207	245	18.4	—	—
Baylin	—	Westmeath		—	244	—	—	—
Castlegregory	—	Kerry		205	243	18.5	—	—
Mulranny	—	Mayo		—	242	—	—	—
Athleague	—	Roscommon		—	241	—	—	—
Redcross	—	Wicklow		196	241	23	—	—
Leap	—	Cork		242	240	-0.8	—	—
Pettigo(–Tullyhommon (Note: Tullyhommon is adjacent to Pettigo across the border in County Fermanagh, Northern Ireland. The population figures relate only to the population within the Republic.))	—	Donegal	Fermanagh	280	239	-14.6	—	—
Ballingeary (Béal Átha an Ghaorthaidh)	—	Cork		234	238	1.7	—	—
Galbally	—	Limerick		257	238	-7.4	—	—
Annaghdown	—	Galway		227	234	3.1	—	—
Ballycastle	—	Mayo		215	234	8.8	—	—
Barndarrig	—	Wicklow		—	233	—	—	—
Liscarroll	—	Cork		256	230	-10.2	—	—
Blacklion	—	Cavan		174	229	31.6	—	—
Beaufort	—	Kerry		240	228	-5	—	—
Carrigart (Carraig Airt)	—	Donegal		249	228	-8.4	—	—
Tullaghan	—	Leitrim		216	228	5.6	—	—
Quigley's Point (Quigleys Point)	—	Donegal		—	227	—	—	—
Raharney (Raharny)	—	Westmeath		231	227	-1.7	—	—
Kilmoganny	—	Kilkenny		228	226	-0.9	—	—
Kilteel	—	Kildare		—	225	—	—	—
Belcarra	—	Mayo		—	222	—	—	—
Croagh	—	Limerick		—	222	—	—	—
Beaulieu	—	Louth		—	221	—	—	—
Kernanstown	—	Carlow		230	221	-3.9	—	—
Dundrum	—	Tipperary		191	220	15.2	—	—
Kilfenora	—	Clare		169	220	30.2	—	—
Ballycumber	—	Offaly		216	219	1.4	—	—
Bunratty	—	Clare		—	219	—	—	—
Dromore West	—	Sligo		—	218	—	—	—
Killinierin	—	Wexford		—	217	—	—	—
Stratford	—	Wicklow		163	217	33.1	—	—
Mountcollins	—	Limerick		221	216	-2.3	—	—
Grangemore	—	Kildare		189	215	13.8	—	—
Knightstown	—	Kerry		156	215	37.8	—	—
Kilteely	—	Limerick		198	214	8.1	—	—
Kinsaley	—	Dublin (Fingal)		—	214	—	—	—
The Swan	—	Laois		—	213	—	—	—
Glencolmcille (Glencolumbkille, Gleann Cholm Cille)	—	Donegal		238	212	-10.9	—	—
Swanlinbar	—	Cavan		266	211	-20.7	—	—
Brosna	—	Kerry		212	210	-0.9	—	—
Ballintra	—	Donegal		211	209	-0.9	—	—
Belmont	—	Offaly		219	209	-4.6	—	—
Bracknagh	—	Offaly		240	209	-12.9	—	—
Duagh	—	Kerry		—	209	—	—	—
Dunhill	—	Waterford		177	209	18.1	—	—
Gleneely	—	Donegal		166	208	25.3	—	—
Killashee	—	Longford		—	208	—	—	—
Ballyhack	—	Wexford		189	207	9.5	—	—
Ballydesmond	—	Cork		191	206	7.9	—	—
Lemybrien	—	Waterford		194	206	6.2	—	—
Shannonbridge	—	Offaly		221	206	-6.8	—	—
Ahascragh	—	Galway		221	205	-7.2	—	—
Ballyfarnan	—	Roscommon		182	205	12.6	—	—
Monard	—	Tipperary		—	205	—	—	—
Inagh	—	Clare		170	204	20	—	—
Loughglynn (Loughglinn)	—	Roscommon		208	204	-1.9	—	—
Bridebridge	—	Cork		208	203	-2.4	—	—
Bree	—	Wexford		—	201	—	—	—
Halfway	—	Cork		—	201	—	—	—
Knocknagree	—	Cork		189	199	5.3	—	—
Legan	—	Longford		—	199	—	—	—
Milltown	—	Galway		—	199	—	—	—
Glassan	—	Westmeath		166	198	19.3	—	—
Rathcoole	—	Cork		—	198	—	—	—
Dunderrow	—	Cork		—	197	—	—	—
Gortahork (Gort an Choirce)	—	Donegal		149	197	32.2	—	—
Killeigh	—	Offaly		159	197	23.9	—	—
Laghey (Laghy)	—	Donegal		169	197	16.6	—	—
Errill (Erril)	—	Laois		158	196	24.1	—	—
Kilbrittain (Killbrittain)	—	Cork		185	196	5.9	—	—
Tulsk	—	Roscommon		—	195	—	—	—
Ballinspittle	—	Cork		—	194	—	—	—
Kildavin	—	Carlow		170	194	14.1	—	—
Kilmeaden	—	Waterford		—	193	—	—	—
Letterfrack	—	Galway		—	192	—	—	—
Ballyroe	—	Kildare		202	191	-5.4	—	—
Ballyagran	—	Limerick		183	190	3.8	—	—
Clonygowan	—	Offaly		—	190	—	—	—
Ballinameen	—	Roscommon		—	188	—	—	—
Clondrohid	—	Cork		—	188	—	—	—
Clontuskert	—	Roscommon		193	188	-2.6	—	—
Castlemaine	—	Kerry		—	187	—	—	—
Castletownshend (Castletownsend)	—	Cork		188	187	-0.5	—	—
Donard	—	Wicklow		182	187	2.7	—	—
Keadue (Keadew)	—	Roscommon		219	187	-14.6	—	—
Lisronagh	—	Tipperary		—	187	—	—	—
Dunderry	—	Meath		—	186	—	—	—
Bonniconlon (Bunnyconnelan West)	—	Mayo		150	185	23.3	—	—
Newbawn	—	Wexford		204	184	-9.8	—	—
Kilgarvan	—	Kerry		164	181	10.4	—	—
Quilty	—	Clare		194	181	-6.7	—	—
Annagassan	—	Louth		—	180	—	—	—
Carrigkerry	—	Limerick		166	180	8.4	—	—
Crossakeel	—	Meath		—	180	—	—	—
Cong	—	Mayo	Galway	150	178	18.7	—	—
Reardnogy (Rearcross)	—	Tipperary		137	176	28.5	—	—
Whitegate	—	Clare		218	176	-19.3	—	—
Kilbrin	—	Cork		—	174	—	—	—
Ballyforan	—	Roscommon		—	172	—	—	—
Brittas	—	Dublin (South Dublin)		154	171	11	—	—
Ballyhahill	—	Limerick		137	170	24.1	—	—
Bohola	—	Mayo		—	170	—	—	—
Rosegreen	—	Tipperary		201	170	-15.4	—	—
Clontibret	—	Monaghan		—	166	—	—	—
Kilmaine (Kilmain)	—	Mayo		142	166	16.9	—	—
Killurin	—	Offaly		—	163	—	—	—
Lough Gowna	—	Cavan		123	161	30.9	—	—
Bellavary	—	Mayo		147	160	8.8	—	—
Inchigeelagh	—	Cork		166	160	-3.6	—	—
Shanballymore	—	Cork		—	160	—	—	—
Threemilehouse (Three Mile House, Cabragh)	—	Monaghan		167	159	-4.8	—	—
Lahardane	—	Mayo		—	156	—	—	—
Williamstown	—	Galway		—	155	—	—	—
Ballynonty	—	Tipperary		—	152	—	—	—
Mountshannon	—	Clare		133	152	14.3	—	—
The Commons	—	Tipperary		—	152	—	—	—
Tournafulla (Toornafulla)	—	Limerick		—	152	—	—	—
Drumkeen	—	Donegal		—	151	—	—	—
Castletown Geoghegan	—	Westmeath		—	150	—	—	—
Aughnacliffe	—	Longford		—	148	—	—	—
Donaskeigh	—	Tipperary		—	147	—	—	—
Ballynoe	—	Cork		—	146	—	—	—
Maddenstown	—	Kildare		154	145	-5.8	—	—
Oram	—	Monaghan		—	145	—	—	—
Coolboy	—	Wicklow		—	144	—	—	—
Knocktopher	—	Kilkenny		—	144	—	—	—
Bellanagare	—	Roscommon		134	142	6	—	—
Knockananna	—	Wicklow		—	141	—	—	—
Kilmyshall	—	Wexford		—	140	—	—	—
Ballycolla	—	Laois		127	138	8.7	—	—
Ballinalack	—	Westmeath		—	137	—	—	—
Ballintober	—	Roscommon		—	137	—	—	—
Ballyhale	—	Kilkenny		—	137	—	—	—
Drangan	—	Tipperary		—	136	—	—	—
Arthurstown	—	Wexford		159	135	-15.1	—	—
Lyre	—	Cork		—	134	—	—	—
Ballymacarbry	—	Waterford		—	132	—	—	—
Liscannor	—	Clare		71	129	81.7	—	—
Ballymacoda	—	Cork		—	128	—	—	—
Mullaghmore	—	Sligo		147	128	-12.9	—	—
Kilflynn	—	Kerry		—	126	—	—	—
Ballyedmond	—	Wexford		—	116	—	—	—
Cromane	—	Kerry		139	115	-17.3	—	—
Dromineer	—	Tipperary		118	113	-4.2	—	—
Feakle	—	Clare		122	113	-7.4	—	—
Portmagee	—	Kerry		—	109	—	—	—
Malin	—	Donegal		122	106	-13.1	—	—
Baltray	—	Louth		121	103	-14.9	—	—
Kilcrohane	—	Cork		—	90	—	—	—
Balreask	—	Meath		212		—	—	—
Coonagh	—	Limerick		213		—	—	—

== See also ==
- List of cities, boroughs and towns in the Republic of Ireland details of municipal towns with councils, distinguishing administrative, electoral, and suburban populations
