= List of national monuments in County Longford =

The Irish state has officially approved the following list of national monuments in County Longford. In the Republic of Ireland, a structure or site may be deemed to be a "national monument", and therefore worthy of state protection, if it is of national importance. If the land adjoining the monument is essential to protect it, this land may also be protected.

== National Monuments ==
NM#	Monument name	Description	Image	Townland	Location
630	Aghaward fort	Ringfort		Aghaward	53°47′32″N 7°38′41″W
677	Corlea Trackway	Timber Trackway		Corlea	53°37′25″N 7°52′22″W
91	Inchcleraun	Early Medieval Ecclesiastical Site		Inchcleraun	53°35′06″N 8°00′40″W
640	Larkfield fort	Ringfort		Larkfield	53°50′30″N 7°32′46″W
263	Granard Motte	Motte & Bailey		Granard	53°46′35″N 7°30′07″W
598	Sonnagh fort	Ringfort		Sonnagh	53°49′51″N 7°36′02″W

== Sources ==
- National Monuments in County Longford
