= Brownstown =

Brownstown can refer to some places:

in the United States

- Brownstown, Arkansas
- Brownstown, Illinois
- Brownstown, Indiana
- Brownstown, Crawford County, Indiana
- Brownstown Township, Jackson County, Indiana
- Brownstown Township, Michigan
- Brownstown, Brown County, Ohio
- Brownstown, Wyandot County, Ohio
- Brownstown, Cambria County, Pennsylvania
- Brownstown, Lancaster County, Pennsylvania
- Brownstown, Washington

Ireland

- Brownstown, County Kildare
- Brownstown, County Tipperary
- Brownstown, County Westmeath
- Brwonstown Head, in County Waterford

== See also ==
- Battle of Brownstown (1812) at Brownstown Township, Michigan, USA, in the War of 1812
- Brown's Town, Saint-Ann, Middlesex, Jamaica
- Brownton, McLeod, Minnesota, USA
- Browntown (disambiguation)
- Brown (disambiguation)
- Town (disambiguation)
