= Larkfield fort =

Ringfort in County Longford, Ireland

- Ráth Chluain Fhuiseog (Irish)
- Location within Ireland
- 53.841538°N 7.546034°W
- Type: ringfort
- Periods: Bronze or Iron Age (c. 2400 BC – AD 400)
- Location: Larkfield, Mullinalaghta, County Longford, Ireland

Site notes
- Material: earth
- Area: 0.14 ha (0.35 acres)
- Owner: private

Designations
- Designation: National Monument

National monument of Ireland
- Official name: Larkfield
- Reference no.: 640

Larkfield fort is a ringfort (rath) and National Monument located in County Longford, Ireland. On the Record of Monuments and Places it bears the code LF006-021----.

== Location ==
Larkfield fort is located east of Lough Gowna, 500 m (1,600 ft) from the edge. The nearest village is Mullinalaghta, 1.9 km (1.2 mi) to the southeast.

== Description ==
The ringfort is a univallate bank and ditch with an entrance in the east.
