= Sonnagh fort =

Ringfort in County Longford, Ireland

- Ráth an tSonnaigh (Irish)
- Location within Ireland
- 53.830744°N 7.600570°W
- Type: ringfort
- Periods: Bronze or Iron Age (c. 2400 BC – AD 400)
- Location: Sonnagh, Aughnacliffe, County Longford, Ireland

Site notes
- Material: earth
- Area: 0.39 ha (0.96 acres)
- Owner: private

Designations
- Designation: National Monument

National monument of Ireland
- Official name: Sonnagh
- Reference no.: 598

Sonnagh fort is a ringfort (rath) and National Monument located in County Longford, Ireland.

== Location ==
Sonnagh fort is located about 1.2 km (0.75 mi) west of Lough Gowna and 7.2 km (4.5 mi) north-northeast of Ballinalee. It stands in a commanding place overlooking the eastern plains extending to County Westmeath.

== Description ==
The ringfort is a large bivallate enclosure with double bank and ditch. A spring lies immediately to the east.

== History ==
There are seven ringforts surrounding Aughnacliffe, of which Sonnagh is the best preserved. These forts are better thought of as protected homesteads rather than military structures. While house type varied, most were made of wood and were usually of post and wattle construction. The walls of the houses consisted of a double row of wattle spaced about 20 cm apart with a cavity filled with straw and bracken for insulation. The roof was thatched with straw and held up with wooden posts. The fort's walls gives their name to the townland: sonnach is Irish for "palisade."
