= Browntown =

Browntown may refer to any of several places in the United States:

- Browntown, New Jersey, an unincorporated community
- Browntown, Bradford County, Pennsylvania, an unincorporated community
- Browntown, Luzerne County, Pennsylvania, a census-designated place
- Browntown, South Carolina, a census-designated place
- Browntown, Albemarle County, Virginia, an unincorporated community
- Browntown, Wisconsin, a village
- Browntown, a gathering of Indian Americans

== See also ==
- Brown's Town, Saint-Ann, Middlesex, Jamaica
- Brownton, McLeod, Minnesota, USA
- Brampton, Ontario
- Brownstown (disambiguation)
- Brown (disambiguation)
- Town (disambiguation)
