= Seán McGuire (fiddler) =

- Born: Sean Stephen Maguire; 26 December 1927; Belfast, Northern Ireland,
- Died: 24 March 2005 (aged 77) Belfast, Northern Ireland
- Genre: Irish traditional music
- Occupation: Musician
- Instrument: fiddle
- Years active: 1941–2004
- Labels: Outlet Records, Belfast, Northern Ireland

Seán Stephen Maguire (26 December 1927 – 24 March 2005) was a professional Irish fiddle (violin) player from Belfast, Co. Antrim. Later known as Seán McGuire, he is widely regarded as one of the finest exponents of traditional Irish fiddle-playing in the 20th century.

== Early life ==
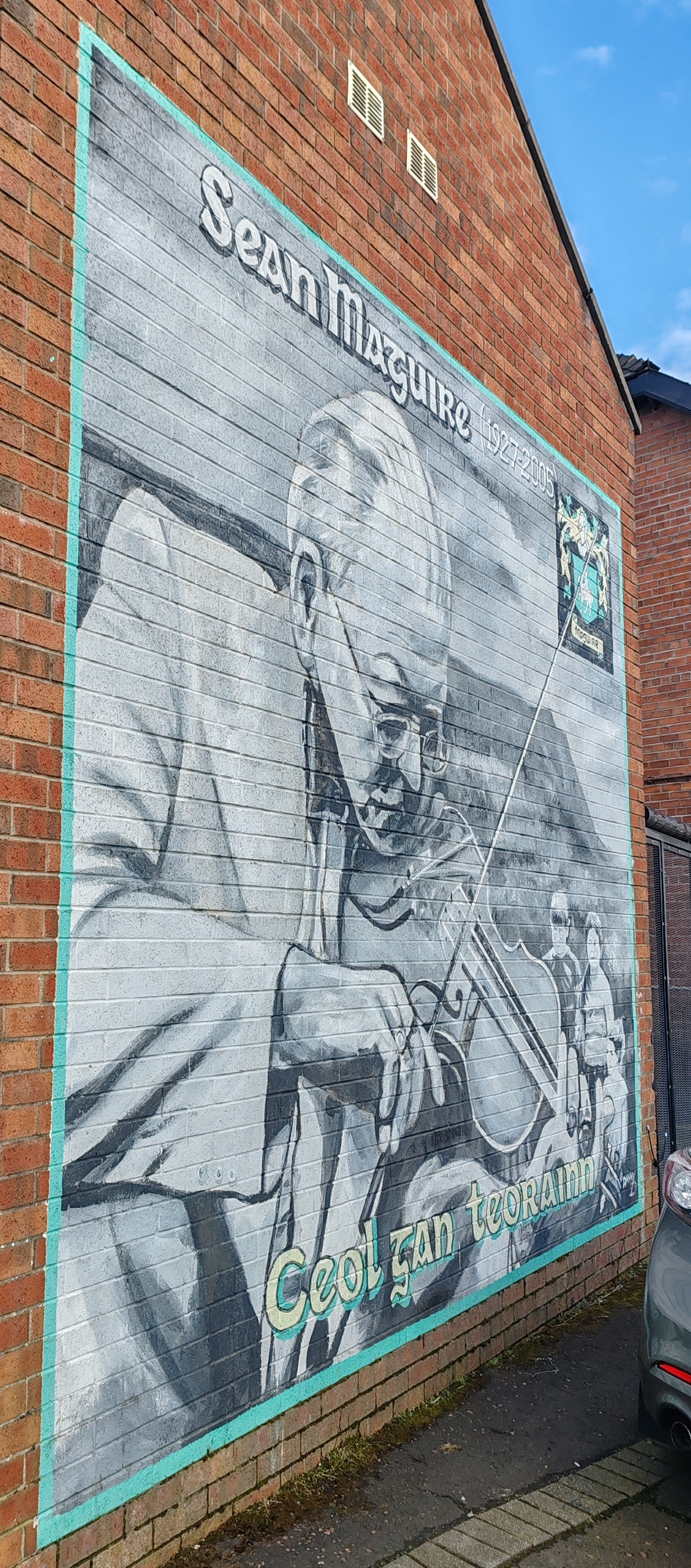
Seán Maguire mural in Belfast

McGuire was immersed in music from an early age with both of his parents being musicians. His father, Johnnie Maguire, migrated to Belfast from Mullahoran, Co. Cavan where he met and married Martha (née Butler) from Ballycastle, Co. Antrim. Johnnie played several instruments, principally the concert flute, in ceili bands. Martha was a singer whilst Seán's brother Jim also played the fiddle.

Seán, from the age of 10, attended lessons with classical violin teachers George Vincent and May Nesbitt. He became an accomplished classical violinist and as a teenager was appointed first violinist of the Belfast Co-operative Youth Orchestra. Meanwhile, he was also developing as an outstanding traditional Irish fiddle prospect. In 1949, at age 21, he won the Oireachtas, All-Ireland Music Championship - with a record score. His concurrent ability as a violinist led to him being offered a position with the Belfast Symphony Orchestra but he declined the role - preferring to embark on a career as a professional fiddle player.

== Career ==
McGuire began touring as a musician with the Malachy Sweeney Ceili Band in the late 1940s - his father was also a member of the band. In the fifties he formed the Seán McGuire Ceili Band and later the Four Star Quartet. Whilst living in Dublin he also toured with the Gael Linn cabaret troupe.

1952 saw Seán McGuire play Carnegie Hall in New York where he also made appearances on the Ed Sullivan and Arthur Godfrey TV shows. Wurlitzer of New York (musical instrument specialists) gave him the honour of playing valuable and famous Stradivarius and Guarnerius violins from their collection. His playing was held in such high esteem that the firm entered his name in their 'Golden Book' - a recognition he shares with violin virtuosos such as Yehudi Menuhin and Fritz Kreisler.

In an extensive recording and performance career McGuire often played with other well-known musicians including Joe Burke, the Galway accordion player, and Barney McKenna from 'The Dubliners'. Much of the sixties he spent in London where he played in the Hibernian Ceili Band. When recording his albums McGuire was very often accompanied on piano by Josephine Keegan.

In Belfast, Seán gave classes at the Clonard Traditional School, run by the McPeakes, and later at the Andersonstown Music School. He was also hired for a time to give demonstrations of traditional fiddle playing in schools throughout Ireland.

== Style and Influence ==
Over the course of his career McGuire developed a distinctive style by which his music could be easily recognised. Notably, he played with a very pronounced bow hand combined with frequent double-stopping for emphasis. He liberally adapted and composed many tunes to showcase his command of the instrument - ranging over all registers and fingering positions. He described his own approach to the music as "progressive traditional"

Almost uniquely amongst traditional Irish performers of his era McGuire combined classical violin technique with an instinctive ear and feel for the folk tradition. Creating flamboyant variations of established tunes was a characteristic of McGuire's music. His signature tune was "The Mason's Apron" to which he added several extra parts, many played almost exclusively in the 3rd position. So intricate were many of his versions that he advised "traditional" players not even to attempt to emulate him.

McGuire believed that traditional Irish music was a neglected art form, that had declined into a relatively primitive state, from a once flourishing Gaelic culture. During his life he worked to develop the repertoire of the music and raise its prestige and standing internationally.

== Later Life ==
After developing throat cancer in the 1980s McGuire temporarily withdrew from public performance. He underwent an operation in 1983 and demonstrated great resilience to continue to make appearances at various events until 2004.

Seán McGuire died on 24 March 2005 after suffering a stroke. The eulogy at his funeral was delivered by his old friend and musical comrade, Joe Burke. He was laid to rest in Milltown Cemetery, Belfast.

A permanent monument to Seán McGuire was erected by Comhaltas Ceoltóirí Éireann in his ancestral parish of Mullahoran, Co. Cavan in 2013.

== Discography ==
- Seán McGuire and Roger Sherlock, Two Champions, Outlet SOLP 1002. Released under at least two other titles, including as Sean McGuire, Irish Traditional Fiddling Outlet SOLP 1002, 1969. With Roger Sherlock (flute), Josephine Keegan (piano). Recorded in Belfast. Later reissued as Outlet PTICD 1002. .
- Seán McGuire and Josephine Keegan, Champion of Champions, Outlet SOLP 1005, 1969 (also as audiocassette). Reissued as Outlet PTICD 1005.
- Seán McGuire, Traditional Irish Fiddle, Outlet SOLP 1006. Also issued as The Best of Sean McGuire Outlet OLP 1006, 1971. Reissued as Outlet PTICD 1006.
- Seán McGuire and Roger Sherlock with Josephine Keegan, At Their Best, Outlet SOLP 1008, 1970 or 1971. L
- Seán McGuire and Joe Burke. Two Champions, SOLP 1014, 1971. Also issued as Seán McGuire and Joe Burke. .
- Seán McGuire, Ireland’s Champion Fiddler, Outlet SOLP 1031. Reissued as PTICD 3031.
- Seán McGuire, Man of Achievement, Top Spin, 1975. Reissued as Outlet PTICD 1052, 1988.
- Seán McGuire, From the Archives, Outlet OAS 3017, 1979. .
- Seán and Jim McGuire, Brothers Together, Outlet PTICD 1055, 1994 also issued by Outlet or catalogued by libraries under the alternate title Pure traditional Irish fiddle music.
- Seán McGuire, Hawks and Doves of Irish Culture, PTICD 1089.

Included in compilations:

- Airs of Ireland, Outlet SOLP 1035, 1977.
- Festival of Traditional Irish Music, Outlet Records CHCD 1037, 1994.
