= Ballinameen =

Ballinameen Béal an Átha Mín
- Village
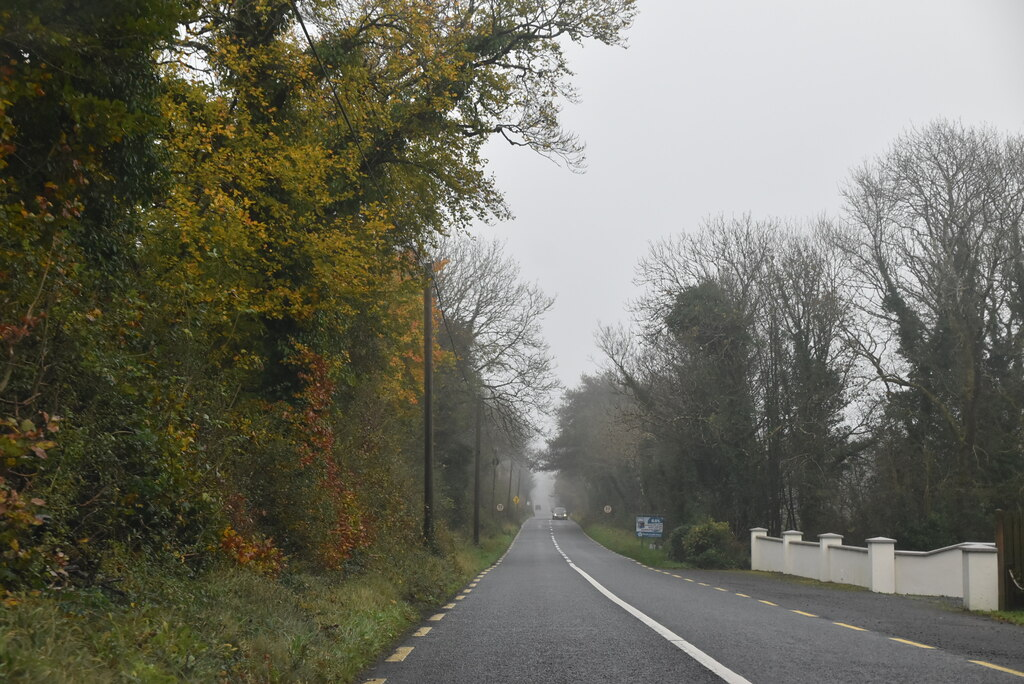
- The R370 regional road at Ballinameen

- Location in Ireland
- Coordinates: 53.897°N 8.302°W
- Country: Ireland
- Province: Connacht
- County: County Roscommon

Population (2022)
  - Total: 223
- Irish grid reference: M801941

Ballinameen (Irish: Béal an Átha Mín) is a small village and census town in County Roscommon, Ireland. Located in the historical barony of Frenchpark on the R370 regional road, the village had a population of 191 people as of the 2016 census.

== History ==
Evidence of ancient settlement in the area includes a number of ringfort and barrow sites in the surrounding townlands of Knockglass, Dooneen and Camlin. The village's Roman Catholic parish church, in the Diocese of Elphin, was designed by William Henry Byrne and completed c. 1903.

== Amenities ==
The local Gaelic Athletic Association club, Ballinameen GAA, won the Roscommon Junior "A" Football Championship in 2019. Scoil Náisiúnta Naomh Eoin, Ballinameen's national (primary) school, is located outside the village and had 38 pupils enrolled in 2017.
