= Census town =

Category of places in India and some other countries

In India and some other countries, a census town is designated as a town that satisfies certain characteristics.

== India ==
In India, a census town is one which is not statutorily notified and administered as a town, but nevertheless whose population has attained urban characteristics. They are characterized by the following:

- Population exceeds 5,000
- At least 75% of main male working population is employed outside the agricultural sector
- Minimum population density of 400 persons per km^{2}

=== Census 2011 ===
The number of census towns (CTs) in India grew from 1,362 in 2001 to 3,894 in 2011. As per Pradhan (2013), these CTs account for 30% of the urban growth in the last decade. Pradhan also notes that the largest increase in the number of CTs was in the states of West Bengal and Kerala.

==== Ministry of Urban Development Notification ====
The Ministry of Urban Development, Government of India, in May 2016 asked the 28 states in India to take action to start the process of recognizing CTs as urban areas. The argument given for this conversion was that a statutory Urban Local Body (ULB) is required to ensure planned development of these areas. In this notification, Rajiv Gauba, Secretary (Urban Development) notes:

The opportunity of planned urban development might get lost if unplanned construction and ad hoc provisioning of infrastructure is allowed to take place over a long time.

Additionally, the Ministry, in the notification, has informed the states that they stand to gain from according statutory status to these towns. With a greater number of statutory towns, the states would be able to get more money from the Centre as per the 14th Finance Commission Report. Additionally, under Atal Mission for Rejuvenation and Urban Transformation (AMRUT), 50% weightage is given to the number of statutory towns in the state/UT to determine the allocation of funds to these states/UTs.

Following this notification, Maharashtra state government converted 19 CTs in the state to statutory ULBs. These 19 CTs are in close proximity to the town of Pune and this conversion is expected to lessen the infrastructure and population pressures on the town.

== Ireland ==
According to Ireland's Central Statistics Office, a census town by definition was a "cluster of fifty or more occupied dwellings, not having a legally defined boundary, in which within a distance of 800 m there is a nucleus of either thirty occupied houses on both sides of the road or twenty occupied houses on one side of the Road". Census towns were distinct from municipal towns; the latter, which had legally defined boundaries and local government powers, were abolished by the Local Government Reform Act 2014. Census towns were replaced by built up areas in the 2022 census.

== See also ==
- Census-designated place – similar classification in the U.S.
