= Maddenstown =

Village in County Kildare, Ireland

Maddenstown Baile Uí Mhadaín (Irish)
- Village
- Location in Ireland
- Coordinates: 53°08′33″N 6°51′38″W
- Country: Ireland
- Province: Leinster
- County: County Kildare

Population (2016)
  - Total: 133
- Time zone: UTC+0 (WET)
  - Summer (DST): UTC-1 (IST (WEST))
- Irish Grid Reference: N763108

Historical population
Year	Pop.	±%
1926	195	—
1936	183	−6.2%
1946	149	−18.6%
1951	165	+10.7%
1966	158	−4.2%
1971	310	+96.2%
1981	294	−5.2%
1986	244	−17.0%
1991	215	−11.9%
1996	189	−12.1%
2002	179	−5.3%
2006	154	−14.0%
2011	145	−5.8%
2016	133	−8.3%

Maddenstown (Irish: Baile Uí Mhadaín) is a village in County Kildare, Ireland, south of The Curragh, 4 km south-east of Kildare town. It is in the parish of Ballysax in the historical barony of Offaly West.

Maddenstown is close to the Curragh race course and is a base for stud farms such as Michael Keogh's Ballysax Manor Stud and racehorse trainers Ms F M Crowley, Paul Deegan, JT Gorman, Caroline Hutchinson, Peter Henley and William Mark Roper. It is located close to the village of Cutbush, and had a population of 133 as of the 2016 census.

== History ==
Maddenstown House was home to Captain William Kelly, horse racing enthusiast and patron of prize fighter Dan Donnelly. Ballyfair House was home to the Lord Lieutenant of Ireland when races were staged at the Curragh Racecourse. James Touchet, third earl of Castlehaven's house at Maddenstown served as a refuge for "a great number of English protestants that had been robbed by the rebels’ and then helped them find their way to safety".

== Sport ==
- Suncroft GAA is the local Gaelic Athletic Association club.

== See also ==
- List of towns and villages in Ireland
