= Aghaward fort =

Ringfort in County Longford, Ireland

- Ráth Áth an Bhaird
- Location within Ireland
- 53.792357°N 7.644732°W
- Type: ringfort
- Periods: Bronze or Iron Age (c. 2400 BC – AD 400)
- Location: Aghaward, Ballinalee, County Longford, Ireland

Site notes
- Material: earth
- Diameter: 22 m (72 ft)
- Circumference: 69 m (226 ft)
- Owner: private

Designations
- Designation: National monument

National monument of Ireland
- Official name: Aghaward
- Reference no.: 630

The Aghaward fort is a ringfort (rath) and national monument located in County Longford, Ireland.

== Location ==
Aghaward fort is located about 2 km (1.2 mi) north of Ballinalee, just north of Aghaward House. There are several springs nearby, and various tributaries of the River Camlin.

== Description ==
The ringfort is an enclosure with a high earthen bank and external ditch, the bank rising up 2.5 m (8 ft 2 in) from the base of the ditch.
