= Grangemore =

Village in County Kildare, Ireland

Grangemore An Ghráinseach Mhór
- Village
- Location in Ireland
- Coordinates: 53°7′3″N 6°42′50″W
- Country: Ireland
- Province: Leinster
- County: County Kildare

Population (2022)
  - Total: 235
- Time zone: UTC+0 (WET)
  - Summer (DST): UTC-1 (IST (WEST))

Grangemore (Irish: An Ghráinseach Mhór) is a village and townland in County Kildare, Ireland. It is 8 km south-east of Newbridge.
