= Aughnacliffe =

Village in County Longford, Ireland

Aughnacliffe Achadh na Cloiche
- Village
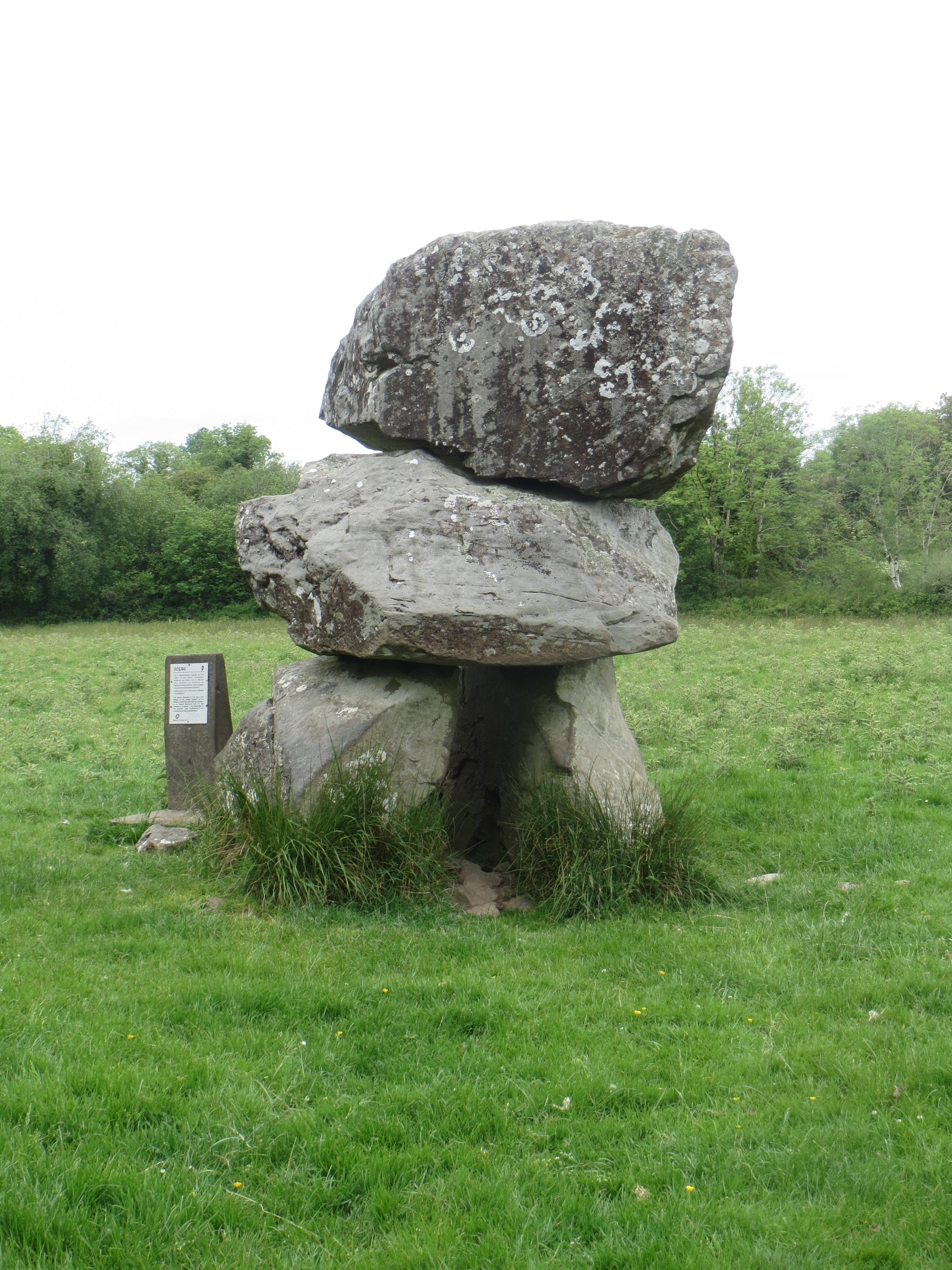
- Aughnacliff Dolmen

- Location in Ireland
- Coordinates: 53°50′48″N 7°36′17″W
- Country: Ireland
- Province: Leinster
- County: County Longford

Population (2016)
  - Total: 177

Aughnacliffe, officially Aghnacliff (Irish: Achadh na Cloiche, meaning 'field of the stones'), is a village in County Longford, Ireland. It is located close to Lough Gowna and the border with County Cavan.

The village, and the townland in which it is located, take their name from the Aughnacliffe Dolmen, a portal tomb which is located nearby. There are a number of other megalithic sites in the area, and Sonnagh fort (a ringfort or rath) lies approximately 1.5 km (0.93 mi) south of the village. The local Roman Catholic Church is dedicated to St. Columcille and was built in 1834. St. Thomas's Church Of Ireland church, in the neighbouring townland of Rathmore, was built in 1829. The local GAA club is Colmcille GFC.
