= Ballycannan =

Village in County Clare, Ireland

Ballycannan Baile Uí Chanáin
- Village
- Location in Ireland
- Coordinates: 52°42′29″N 8°38′40″W
- Country: Ireland
- Province: Munster
- County: County Clare

Population (2016)
  - Total: 638
- Time zone: UTC+0 (WET)
  - Summer (DST): UTC-1 (IST (WEST))

Ballycannan (Irish: Baile Uí Chanáin) is a village in County Clare, Ireland. It is 5 km north of the centre of Limerick.
