= Mullahoran =

Townland in County Cavan, Ireland

Mullahoran Mhullach Odhráin
- Townland
- Location in Ireland
- Coordinates: 53°50′N 7°26′W
- Country: Ireland
- Province: Ulster
- County: County Cavan
- Barony: Clanmahon
- Time zone: UTC+0 (WET)
  - Summer (DST): UTC-1 (IST (WEST))

Mullahoran (Irish: Mhullach Odhráin – Hilltop of Odhrán) is a townland in the south-west of County Cavan, bordering County Longford, on the northern edge of the Midlands in Ireland. It is also the name of a Roman Catholic parish. It is a constituent part of the electoral division and civil parish of Drumlumman.

== Built environment ==
Our Lady of Lourdes Roman Catholic Church is located in the area. The church was built for parish priest Thomas O'Reilly in an unusual Romanesque style between 1911-14 by local builder W.A. Coote and was designed by Dublin architect Thomas McNamara.

== Sport ==
Mullahoran GAA club and grounds (Our Lady of Lourdes Park) are located in the area; the majority of the club's members hail from the local rural area, although some come from townlands slightly further afield.

== Notable people ==
- Paul Brady, handball and Gaelic football player.
- Sean McGuire - fiddler
- Assistant Commissioner Noel Smith (retired), formerly a senior-ranking officer in the Garda Síochána; raised in the townland of Cloncovid, and later educated at St Mel's College in Longford. As a Chief Superintendent in County Cork at the time, he was initially in overall charge of the Sophie Toscan du Plantier murder investigation in West Cork, being in overall charge between December 1996 and June 1997.
- John Wilson, former Tánaiste.

== See also ==
- Kilcogy
- Mullinalaghta
