= Ballyroe =

Townland in County Mayo, Ireland

Ballyroe Buaile Ruadh
- Townland
- Location in Ireland
- Coordinates: 53.7833°N 8.91667°W
- Country: Ireland
- Province: Connacht
- County: County Mayo

Ballyroe (Irish: An Bhuaile Rua, meaning 'red dairy place)' is a townland in County Mayo, Ireland. It is in the civil parish of Knock.

== Census ==
Year	Population	Houses
1841	39	7
1851	39	7
1861	51	8
1871	45	6
1881	39	6
1891	36	6
1901	34	6
1911	26	6

== Geography ==
Ballyroe borders Lispatrick to the North. Killoveeny to the South. Caldragh to the north West. It connects with Cloonturnaun slightly to the west on Lough Turnaun. The R323 Regional Road runs through the townland. Eastpoint, which is at the east of the county, is the most easterly point in Knock parish.

Most of Ballyroe is mainly pastureland and quite hilly. There is a lake in the area which has a number of small streams that flow through the area.

== Townland marker ==
Many townlands in Ireland have a marker noting the townland's name. Ballyroe's townland marker is located on the R323 regional road just outside Knock.

== See also ==
- Knock
