= Crocknamurleog =

Village in County Donegal, Ireland

Crocknamurleog Cnoc na Muirleog
- Village
- Location in Ireland
- Coordinates: 55°11′47.69″N 7°50′47.15″W
- Country: Ireland
- Province: Ulster
- County: County Donegal

Population (2016)
  - Total: 396
- Time zone: UTC+0 (WET)
  - Summer (DST): UTC-1 (IST (WEST))

Crocknamurleog (Irish: Cnoc na Muirleog) is a village in County Donegal, Ireland. As of the 2016 census, the village had a population of 396 people, up from 346 as of the 2006 census.

== See also ==
- List of towns and villages in the Republic of Ireland
