= Brownstown, County Kildare =

Village in County Kildare, Ireland

Brownstown Baile an Bhrúnaigh
- Village
- Location in Ireland
- Coordinates: 53°08′10″N 6°50′24″W
- Country: Ireland
- Province: Leinster
- County: County Kildare
- Elevation: 100 m (330 ft)

Population (2016)
  - Total: 883
- Time zone: UTC+0 (WET)
  - Summer (DST): UTC-1 (IST (WEST))
- Irish Grid Reference: N 777 101

Historical population
Year	Pop.	±%
1936	118	—
1946	122	+3.4%
1951	116	−4.9%
1956	231	+99.1%
1961	186	−19.5%
1966	193	+3.8%
1971	195	+1.0%
1981	231	+18.5%
1986	453	+96.1%
1991	544	+20.1%
1996	462	−15.1%
2002	500	+8.2%
2006	482	−3.6%
2011	846	+75.5%
2016	883	+4.4%

Brownstown (Irish: Baile an Bhrúnaigh) is a village in County Kildare, Ireland, south of The Curragh and east of Kildare Town. It is situated on the road from Athy to Newbridge closed to the village of Cutbush. Spanning the townlands of Brownstown Lower and Brownstown Great, it is located in the historical barony of Offaly East and the civil parish of Carn. As of the 2016 census, the Central Statistics Office recorded Brownstown as having a population of 883 people.

== See also ==
- List of towns and villages in Ireland
