= Brownstown, Crawford County, Indiana =

Unincorporated community in Indiana, U.S.

Coordinates: 38°22′51″N 86°30′11″W

Brownstown is an unincorporated community in Crawford County, Indiana, in the United States.

== History ==
When Brownstown contained a post office, it was called Mount Prospect. That post office operated from 1835 until 1918.
