= Ballyoulster =

Village in County Kildare, Ireland

Ballyoulster Baile Ualstair
- Village
- Location in Ireland
- Coordinates: 53°20′25″N 6°30′57″W
- Country: Ireland
- Province: Leinster
- County: County Kildare

Population (2016)
  - Total: 479
- Time zone: UTC+0 (WET)
  - Summer (DST): UTC-1 (IST (WEST))

Ballyoulster (Irish: Baile Ualstair) is a village and townland located in County Kildare, Ireland. Historically it lies within the barony of South Salt and the civil parish of Donaghcumper. For planning purposes, it is treated by Kildare County Council as a 'key development area' within the local area plan for the nearby town of Celbridge. It is, however, treated independently by the Central Statistics Office for census purposes, and was recorded as having a population of 479 people in the 2016 census. Ballyoulster United is the local association football (soccer) club, which (as of 2015) was competing in the Leinster Senior League.

== See also ==
- Donaghcumper Church
