= Mullinalaghta =

Mullinalaghta Mullach na Leachta
- Village
- Location in Ireland
- Coordinates: 53°49′59″N 7°31′07″W
- Country: Ireland
- Province: Leinster
- County: County Longford
- Elevation: 98 m (322 ft)

Population (2016)
  - Rural: 447
- (includes surrounding electoral division, and part of electoral division of Creevy)
- Time zone: UTC+0 (WET)
  - Summer (DST): UTC-1 (IST (WEST))
- Irish Grid Reference: N316872

Mullinalaghta (/ˌmɔːlɪnəˈlæxtə, -lɪnˈjæx-/; Irish Mullach na Leachta), also officially referred to as Mullanalaghta, is a half-parish in the north-eastern part of County Longford, Ireland, located about eight kilometres north of Granard.

== Name and topography ==
Mullinalaghta, in Irish Mullach na Leachta, means "hill of the standing stones (or gravestones)", and is derived from a hill in the centre of the area which was the original site of the local church.

The area consists of eleven townlands: Aghanoran (Achadh an Fhuaráin), Cloonagh (Cluain Each), Clooneen (Cluainín), Culleenmore (An Cuilleann Mór), Derrycassan (Doire an Chasáin), Druminacrehir (Droimeann na Criathrach), Kilmore (An Chill Mhór), Larkfield (Cluain Fhuiseog), Leitrim (Liathdhroim), Mullinroe (An Mullán Rua) and Toome (An Tom).

Mullinalaghta is not itself a townland, but is part of the townland of Cloonagh. The area has well-defined boundaries, with Lough Gowna and the River Erne bounding it to the west and north, the parish of Mullahoran in County Cavan on its eastern border, and a tributary of the Erne, the Clooneen River, separating it from the rest of County Longford on the south.

== History ==
Mullinalaghta formed part of the medieval territory of Annaly, largely corresponding to today's County Longford. It was under the control of the Mac Gearadháin (Gaynor) family, being referred to in sixteenth century documents as Muntergerran (Muintir Gearadháin). Ecclesiastically, it was under the control of the abbey of Inchmore in Lough Gowna, founded by Saint Colmcille in the 6th century. This was reflected by Mullinalaghta forming part of the civil parish of Columbkille and also being part of the same Roman Catholic parish until 1839, when it was joined with the Cavan parish of Scrabby to its north, with which it has since been united. The area has been hard hit by emigration, with the population declining from a pre-Famine peak of over 3,200, to its present population of less than five hundred.

== Tourism and economy ==
Mullinalaghta's landscape is a combination of rolling drumlins, lakes, and woodland having earned it the description of "the new West Cork" by the journalist Mary Kenny. Tourism is important in the area, with Lough Gowna and the river Erne being noted for their coarse fishing. A former landlord's demesne at Derrycassan on the shore of Lough Gowna has been planted with both deciduous and coniferous trees by the Irish Forestry Commission, and has been developed by the local community as a tourist attraction with walks and picnic areas. The demesne was owned by the Dopping family, who built a mansion there, reputedly with stones from the medieval abbey on Inchmore. When Derrycassan House was demolished in the 1930s, the stones were bought by the local community to be used to build a new Catholic church in the parish.

The area is mainly agricultural, with dairy and drystock cattle farming and sheep farming predominating. The main centre of population is in the adjacent townlands of Cloonagh and Larkfield, which contains the Roman Catholic Church (erected in 1939) and a graveyard including the site of an earlier church from 1832, as well as facilities such as a primary school, post office (closed in 2018), community centre, and a public house.

== Gaelic football ==
Gaelic football is the main sport in the area, and Mullinalaghta St Columba's is the local club. Founded in 1889, the club was the first from Longford to win a Leinster Club Senior Football title in 2018.

== Notable people ==
- Larry Cunningham, a country music singer
