= Lough Gowna =

- Loch Gamhna (Irish)
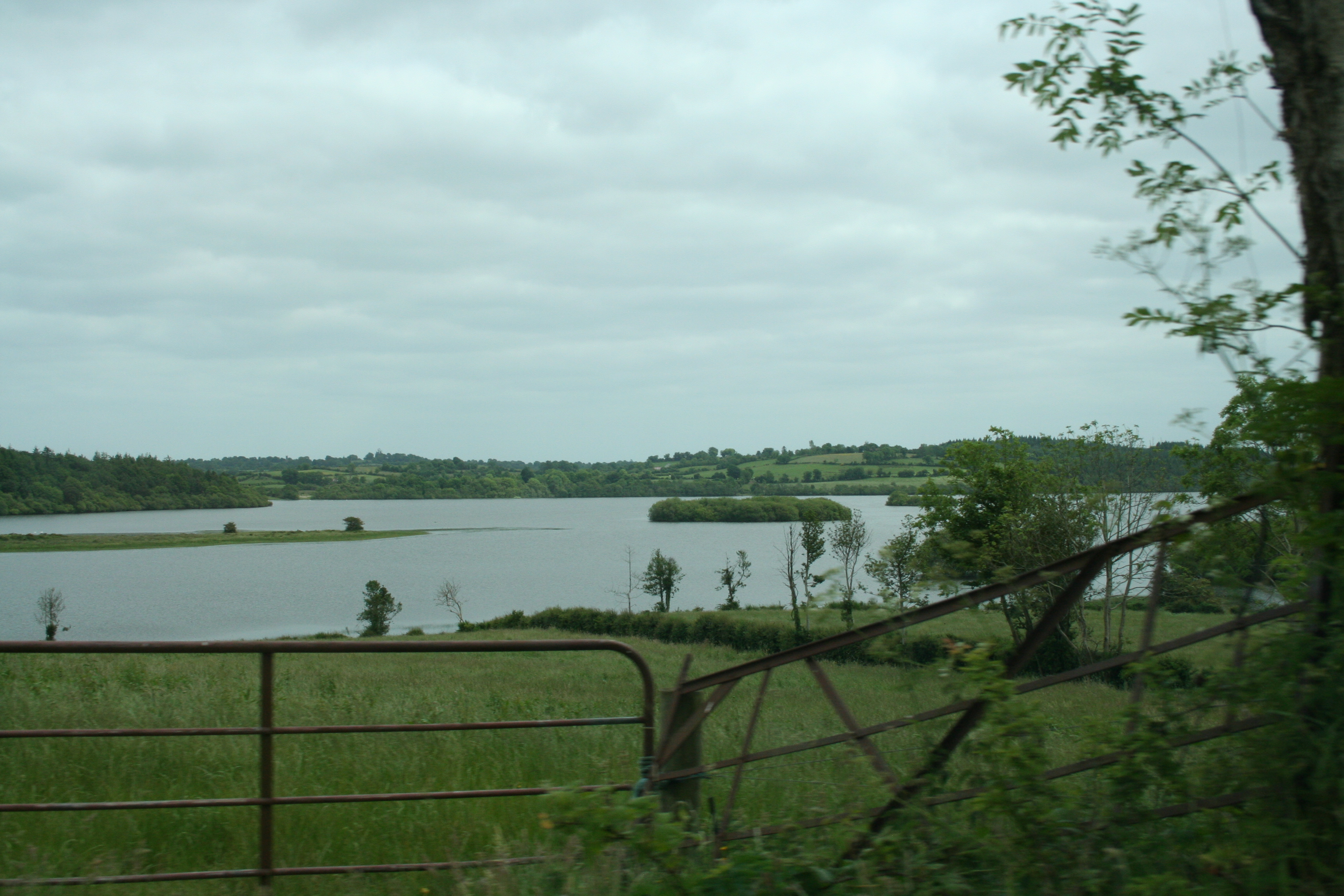

- Location within Ireland
- Location: County Cavan and County Longford
- Coordinates: 53°51′N 7°33′W
- Type: Moraine dammed lake
- Primary inflows: River Erne
- Primary outflows: River Erne
- Basin countries: Ireland
- Islands: Inchmore
- Settlements: Loch Gowna, Colmcille, Mullinalaghta, Dromard, Mullahoran

Lough Gowna (Irish: Loch Gamhna, meaning 'calf lake') is a fresh water lake which is the uppermost lake on the River Erne. It is located on the border between County Longford and County Cavan, with the largest part of the lake being in County Longford.

Lough Gowna is a moraine-dammed lake formed at the end of the last glaciation, and owes its complex indented shape to the underlying drumlin landscape. This results in a large number of bays and inlets on the lake, often connected by narrow channels. The river Erne enters the system in a western direction into the easternmost part of the lake (locally known as Derries Lough) and exits northward through County Cavan. However, the damming caused by the moraines that gave rise to the lake result in large bodies of water to the north-west and south-west which form the bulk of the area of the lake. A number of other small rivers also flow into the lake. The county border runs through the north-western part of the lake, and then turns eastwards, with the western and southern parts of the lake being in Longford and the north-eastern parts being in Cavan.

The north-western and south-western portions of the lake are connected by a narrow channel at Dernaferst (a townland on the western (Longford) shore of the lake, but which is in County Cavan). The northern and eastern shores of the lake are surrounded by peat bog, with areas of planted woodland along the southern shores of the lake in former demesnes in the townlands of Derrycassan and Culray. The lake is considered to be an important site for wintering wildfowl.

The lake contains one large island in the south-western part, Inchmore (Inis Mór in Irish, meaning "Big island"), which was the site of a monastery founded in the sixth century by Saint Colmcille. The monastery was raided by the Vikings in 804, being burned and looted. During the twelfth century, the abbey conformed to Augustinian rules and remained there until the dissolution of the monasteries by King Henry VIII in 1543. The site was still used as a graveyard by the local population until the early years of the twentieth century. The remains of the abbey are still to be seen on the island. A fifteenth-century tower bell, reputedly from the monastery, was recovered in the nineteenth century and now hangs in the Roman Catholic church in the nearby village of Aughnacliffe.

Lough Gowna is an important centre for coarse fishing and the shape of the lake, with wooded peninsulas interspersed with bays and inlets, make it attractive for tourism. There are picnic sites at Dernaferst and at Dring (at the southernmost point of the lake).

The name of the lake comes from a legend about a supernatural calf which escaped from a well in the townland of Rathcor (south of the lake) and raced northward with a stream of water from the well following it and flooding the area now making up the lake.

The lake gives its name to the village of Loch Gowna, which is near the north-eastern shore of the lake in County Cavan. The original name of the village was Scrabby (Screabach in Irish), and gave its name to the townland and parish in which it is located. However, in 1950, after a plebiscite of the villagers, the name was officially changed to Loch Gowna. The village, which actually sits on the shores of Swan Lake, acts as a service centre for tourism, with hotel accommodation and sizeable numbers of holiday homes in the area. As of 2022, it had a population of 168.

Other parishes adjacent to the lake are Colmcille on the western and southern shores of the lake, Mullinalaghta on the eastern shore, and Dromard in the extreme north-west, all in County Longford; and Mullahoran in the extreme east where the Erne enters the lake, in County Cavan.

== Dopping-Hempenstall ==
In the 19th c the Dopping-Hempenstall family had a large yacht on the lake for their private use. it was built in iron by Bewley and Webb in Dublin.

== Gallery ==
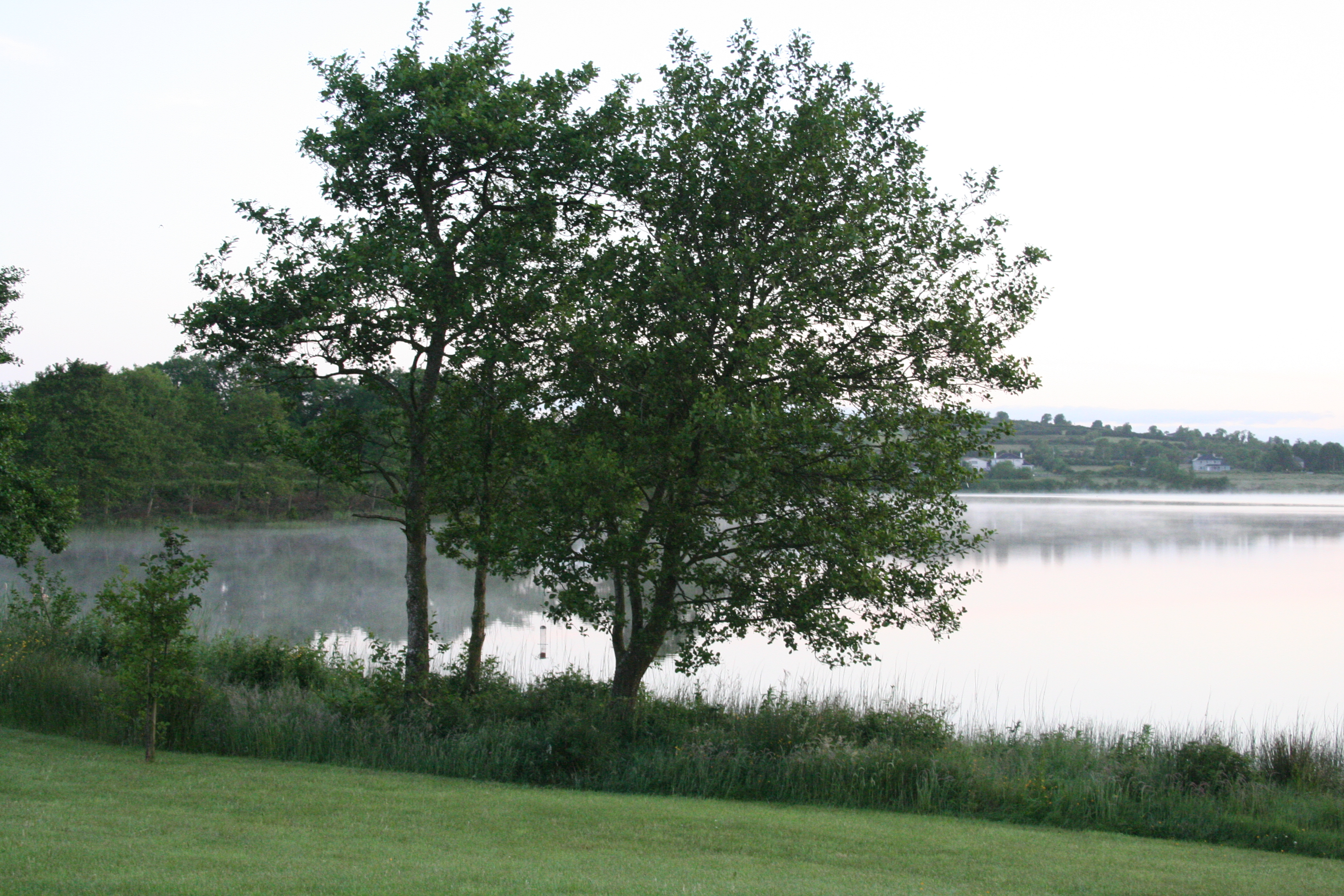

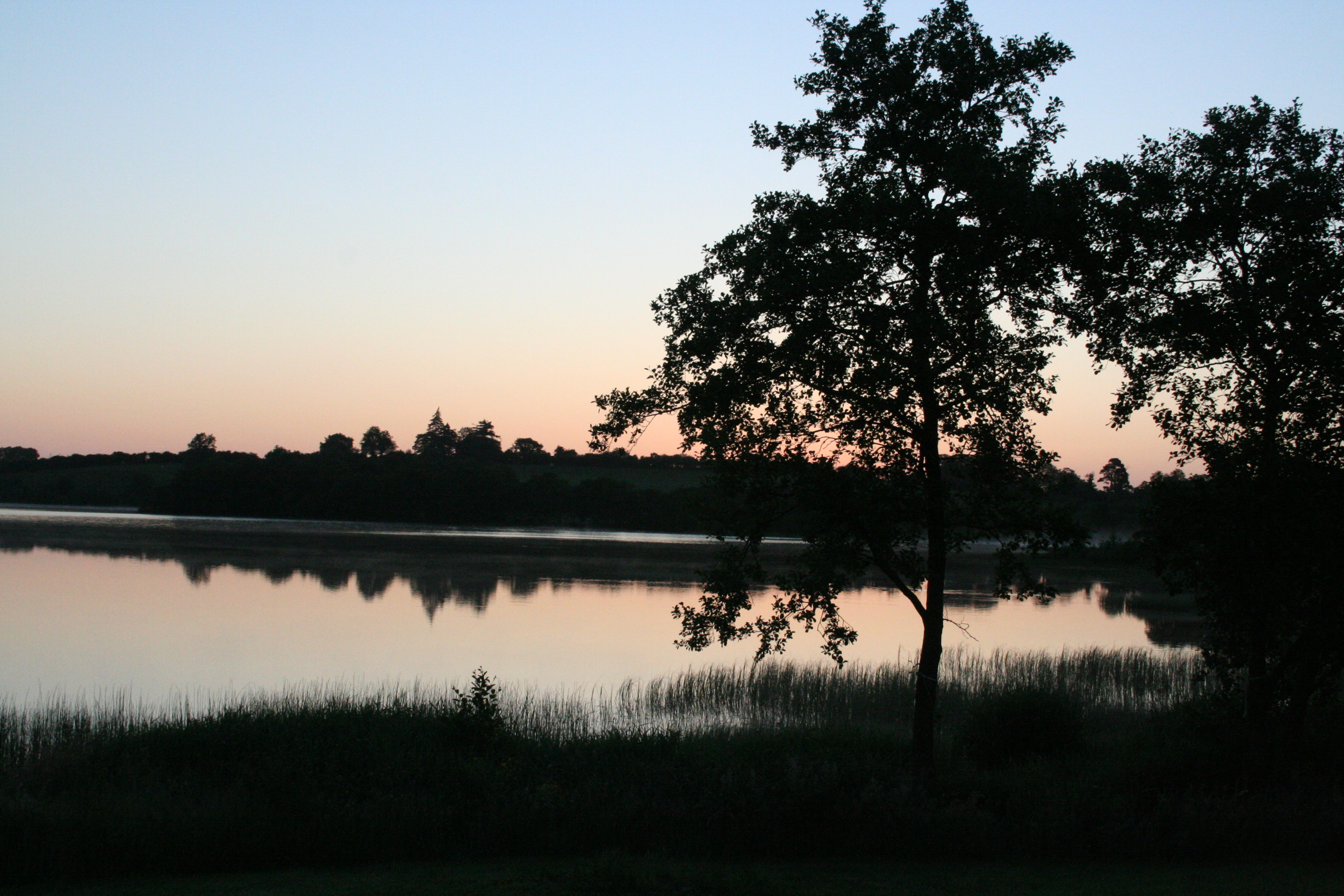

== See also ==
- List of towns in Ireland
