= List of cities, boroughs and towns in the Republic of Ireland =

The following table and map show the areas in Ireland, previously designated as Cities, Boroughs, or Towns in the Local Government Act 2001.

Under the Local Government (Ireland) Act 1898, Ireland had a two-tier system of local authorities. The first tier consisted of administrative counties and county boroughs. The county boroughs were in the major municipal population centres. The second tier consisted of urban districts, governed by urban district councils; some of the urban district retained a higher status of borough with a corporation. Below that were towns with town commissioners, administered under the Towns Improvement (Ireland) Act 1854.

Under the Local Government Act 2001, administrative counties and county boroughs were redesignated as counties and cities respectively. The lower tier consisted of boroughs and towns (including both former urban districts and towns administered by town commissioners).

Under the Local Government Reform Act 2014, only Dublin, Cork and Galway retain separate city councils. Limerick and Waterford were merged into the corresponding county councils and all borough and town councils were abolished. Municipal districts were created from local electoral areas with councillors being those elected to the county councils. In the case of Limerick and Waterford, these are called Metropolitan Districts; in the case of Drogheda, Wexford, Sligo and Clonmel, these are called Borough Districts; and in the case of Kilkenny, it is called the Municipal District of Kilkenny City.

== Explanation of table ==
Column name	Meaning	Explanation	Sources
Name(s)	Names of the town	The first name listed is the commonest English name, and links to the relevant article. Alternative names are listed in parentheses. If the official name used in census reports is not the linked name, it is in italics. Only the name of the municipality is given, not that of any suburban areas (e.g. Tallaght is not named separately from Dublin).	
Council	Type of municipal council	The Local Government Act 2001 defines three types of municipal council, namely "City", "Borough", and "Town". The "Town council" label replaced the earlier "Urban district council" and "Town commissioners", but did not abolish the distinction in their respective powers. Values listed in this column are as follows: City / For the 5 former county boroughs with the same powers as county councils. (Note: Kilkenny was governed by Borough Council until 2014, but retained the right to the description "City" for ceremonial purposes. Since 2014, it has been governed by the Municipal District of Kilkenny City within Kilkenny County Council.); Borough / For the few ancient boroughs whose charters were not extinguished by the Municipal Corporations (Ireland) Act 1840 or promoted to the status later. Their powers were practically identical to those of the former urban districts and later town councils, but the label "borough" was more prestigious. Abolished in 2014.; UD / Area which was governed by an urban district under the Local Government (Ireland) Act 1898 and a town council under the Local Government Act 2001. Abolished in 2014.; Comm / Area which was governed by town commissioners under the Towns Improvement (Ireland) Act 1854, less powerful than an urban district council, and a town council under the Local Government Act 2001. Abolished in 2014.	
Core County	Core county for town	County is that in which the municipal area is entirely located. In the case of cities, the namesake county is considered the core county even though the city is administratively separate from it.	
Other Counties	Other counties	For towns whose suburbs/environs span a county boundary, any county other than the core county.	
2011 Tot	Total population in 2011.	Sum of the municipal population and the suburban population.	
Tot area	Total area of the town	2011 area in square kilometres (km^{2}). Only for towns with a total population of at least 1,500.	
Tot dens	Population density of total area	Persons per km^{2}. Based on 2011 total area and population.	Calculated
2011 Mun	Population of the municipal area in 2011	Population within the 2011 municipal area.	
% change Mun	Change in population of the municipal area.	As a percentage of 2006 population. Where the municipal area changed in the interim, this is noted.	Calculated. For changed areas:
Mun area	Municipal area of the town	Area within the legally defined municipal boundary in 2011. Where this had increased since 2006, this is noted.	For changed areas:
Mun dens	Population density of municipal area	Persons per km^{2}. Based on 2011 municipal area and population.	Calculated
2009 elect	Electorate for the 2009 local elections.	The Local Government Act 1994 extended the boundaries of some towns for electoral purposes only. That is, people living outside the municipal area were entitled to vote for the town council even though their residence was outside its jurisdiction. In a few cases, the municipal boundary of the town was subsequently extended to remove this anomaly. The remaining cases are marked by an asterisk in this column. Where the municipal area changed between the 2006 census and the 2009 election, this is noted. (No municipal area changed between the 2009 election and the 2011 census.)	
2011 Sub	Population of the suburbs/environs in 2011	Called "Suburbs" for cities and "Environs" for boroughs and towns. Defined as "the continuation of a distinct population cluster outside its legally defined boundary in which no occupied dwelling is more than 100 metres distant from the nearest occupied dwelling. In applying the 100-metre criterion, industrial, commercial and recreational buildings and facilities are not regarded as breaking the continuity of a built-up area. New suburbs or environs are defined only where there are at least twenty occupied dwellings outside the legal boundary within the new limit." The 2006 definition was changed by reducing the limit from 200 metres to 100.	

== Cities, boroughs and towns up to 2014 ==
Name(s)	Council	Core County	Other Counties	2011 Total	Tot area	Tot dens	2011 Mun	Mun area	Mun dens	2009 elect	2011 Sub
Dublin	City	Dublin	Dublin (Dún Laoghaire–Rathdown, Fingal, South Dublin)	1,110,627	318	3,493	527,612	116.58	4,526	347,312	583,015
Cork	City	Cork		198,582	494	402	119,230	38.59	3,090	82,896	79,352
Limerick	City	Limerick	Clare	91,454	57	1,604	57,106 (Note: City boundary extended after the 2006 census and before the 2009 election.)	28.38	2,012	40,358	34,348
Galway	City	Galway		76,778	53	1,449	75,529	50	1,511	46,164	1,249
Waterford	City	Waterford	Kilkenny	51,519	44	1,171	46,732	38.35	1,219	26,598	4,787
Drogheda	Borough	Louth	Meath	38,578	15	2,572	30,393	12.76	2,382	23,091*	8,185
Kilkenny	City	Kilkenny		24,423	27	905	8,711	3.74	2,329	14,324*	15,712
Wexford	Borough	Wexford		20,072	38	528	19,913 (Note: Borough boundary extended after the 2006 census and before the 2009 election.)	18.63	1,069	15,752	159
Sligo	Borough	Sligo		19,452	31	627	17,568	12.84	1,368	13,941*	1,884
Clonmel	Borough	Tipperary	Waterford	17,908	17	1,053	15,793	11.36	1,390	10,763	2,115
Dundalk	UD	Louth		37,816	110	344	31,149	25.19	1,237	21,958*	6,667
Bray	UD	Wicklow	Dublin (Dún Laoghaire–Rathdown)	31,872	9	3,541	26,852	7.49	3,585	19,255*	5,020
Navan (An Uaimh)	UD	Meath		28,559	45	635	28,158 (Note: Town boundary extended after the 2006 census and before the 2009 election.)	20.04	1,405	17,541	401
Ennis	UD	Clare		25,360	45	564	20,180	14.6	1,382	14,182	5,180
Tralee	UD	Kerry		23,693	32	740	20,814	12.09	1,722	16,391*	2,879
Carlow	UD	Carlow	Laois	23,030	13	1,772	13,698	6.45	2,124	11,835*	9,332
Naas	UD	Kildare		20,713	18	1,151	20,713	18.24	1,136	13,434	—
Athlone	UD	Westmeath	Roscommon	20,153	17	1,185	15,558	10.92	1,425	12,637*	4,595
Letterkenny	UD	Donegal		19,588	48	408	15,387	19.03	809	10,905*	4,201
Tullamore	UD	Offaly		14,361	21	684	11,346	7.84	1,447	8,573*	3,015
Killarney	UD	Kerry		14,219	38	374	12,740	13.44	948	8,064*	1,479
Arklow	UD	Wicklow		13,009	14	929	12,770	6.44	1,983	7,831	239
Cobh	UD	Cork		12,347	9	1,372	6,500	2.38	2,731	8,087*	5,847
Castlebar	UD	Mayo		12,318	27	456	10,826	11.5	941	8,115*	1,492
Midleton	UD	Cork		12,001	12	1,000	3,733	1.55	2,408	7,102*	8,268
Mallow	UD	Cork		11,605	17	683	8,578	6.49	1,322	7,965*	3,027
Ballina	UD	Mayo		11,086	30	370	10,361	13.69	757	7,569*	725
Enniscorthy	UD	Wexford		10,838	18	602	2,842	1.16	2,450	5,806*	7,996
Wicklow	UD	Wicklow		10,356	10	1,036	6,761	3.08	2,195	6,069*	3,595
Cavan	UD	Cavan		10,205	18	567	3,649	2.01	1,815	4,406*	6,556
Athy	UD	Kildare		9,926	25	397	9,587	10.29	932	6,263	339
Longford	UD	Longford		9,601	22	436	8,002	8.93	896	6,100*	1,599
Dungarvan	UD	Waterford		9,427	17	555	7,991	6.21	1,287	6,210	1,436
Nenagh	UD	Tipperary		8,439	18	469	8,023	8.46	948	5,388*	416
Trim	UD	Meath		8,268	9	919	1,441	0.67	2,151	4,271*	6,827
New Ross	UD	Wexford	Kilkenny	8,151	5	1,630	4,533	1.87	2,424	5,533*	3,618
Thurles	UD	Tipperary		7,933	13	610	6,929	5.15	1,345	5,877*	1,004
Youghal	UD	Cork		7,794	11	709	6,990	4.87	1,435	5,683*	804
Monaghan	UD	Monaghan		7,452	13	573	6,637	5.51	1,205	5,474*	815
Buncrana	UD	Donegal		6,839	17	402	3,452	4.67	739	4,766*	3,387
Ballinasloe	UD	Galway	Roscommon	6,659	18	370	6,449	16.74	385	5,092*	210
Fermoy	UD	Cork		6,489	8	811	2,223	1.25	1,778	5,000*	4,266
Westport	UD	Mayo		6,063	20	303	5,543	8.14	681	3,731	520
Carrick-on-Suir	UD	Tipperary	Waterford	5,931	9	659	5,886	9	654	3,500	45
Kells (Ceannanus Mór)	UD	Meath		5,888	6	981	2,208	1.18	1,871	3,769*	3,680
Birr	UD	Offaly	Tipperary	5,822	19	306	4,428	6.35	697	3,295	1,394
Tipperary	UD	Tipperary		5,310	11	483	4,322	3.36	1,286	3,798*	988
Carrickmacross	UD	Monaghan		4,925	10	493	1,978	1.42	1,393	4,302*	2,947
Kinsale	UD	Cork		4,893	7	699	2,198	1.11	1,980	3,099*	2,695
Listowel	UD	Kerry		4,832	17	284	4,205	6.36	661	3,841*	627
Clonakilty	UD	Cork		4,721	10	472	4,000	4.45	899	3,634*	721
Cashel	UD	Tipperary		4,051	5	810	2,275	1.35	1,685	2,929*	1,776
Macroom	UD	Cork		3,879	22	176	3,738	10.67	350	2,937	141
Castleblayney (Castleblaney)	UD	Monaghan		3,634	7	519	1,752	1.2	1,460	3,118*	1,882
Kilrush	UD	Clare		2,695	11	245	2,539	5.35	475	2,137	156
Skibbereen	UD	Cork		2,670	9	297	2,568	4.07	631	1,947	102
Bundoran	UD	Donegal		2,140	10	214	1,781	3.93	453	1,529	359
Templemore	UD	Tipperary		2,071	10	207	1,941	4.35	446	1,766*	130
Clones	UD	Monaghan		1,761	5	352	1,491	1.83	815	1,601*	270
Newbridge (Droichead Nua)	Comm	Kildare		21,561	16	1,348	17,127	2.8 (Note: Droichead Nua (Newbridge) Urban electoral division)	6,117	13,604	4,434
Portlaoise (Portlaoise)	Comm	Laois		20,145	19	1,060	3,639	2.05 (Note: Portlaoighise (Maryborough) Urban electoral division)	1,775	8,409*	16,506
Mullingar	Comm	Westmeath		20,103	23	874	9,414	5.58 (Note: Mullingar North Urban electoral division plus Mullingar South Urban electoral division)	1,687	9,791*	10,689
Balbriggan	Comm	Dublin (Fingal)		19,960	13	1,535	19,932 (Note: Town boundary extended after the 2006 census and before the 2009 election.)	6.52 (Note: Revised area is old area (Balbiggan Urban electoral division, area 2.2 km^{2}) plus added area (432 hectares))	3,061	10,500	28
Greystones	Comm	Wicklow		17,468	30	582	10,173	3.8 (Note: Greystones electoral division)	2,677	9,966*	7,295
Leixlip	Comm	Kildare		15,452	7	2,207	15,452	11.3 (Note: Leixlip electoral division)	1,367	12,724	—
Tramore	Comm	Waterford		10,328	14	738	9,722	16.61 (Note: Tramore electoral division)	585	7,712	606
Shannon	Comm	Clare		9,673	9	1,075	9,673 (Note: Town boundary extended after the 2006 census and before the 2009 election.)	31.2	310	7,113	—
Gorey	Comm	Wexford		9,114	9	1,013	3,463	1.71 (Note: Gorey Urban electoral division)	2,025	4,379*	5,651
Tuam	Comm	Galway		8,242	13	634	3,348	2.36 (Note: Tuam Urban electoral division)	1,419	5,863*	4,894
Edenderry	Comm	Offaly		6,977	17	410	6,490	7.93 (Note: Edenderry Urban electoral division)	818	4,306*	487
Bandon	Comm	Cork		6,640	10	664	1,917	0.84 (Note: Bandon electoral division)	2,282	3,886*	4,723
Passage West	Comm	Cork		5,790	10	579	5,122	4.03 (Note: Monkstown Urban electoral division)	1,271	4,315*	668
Loughrea	Comm	Galway		5,062	4	1,266	5,062	4.25 (Note: Loughrea Urban electoral division)	1,191	3,914	—
Ardee	Comm	Louth		4,927	14	352	4,554	4.75 (Note: Ardee Urban electoral division)	959	3,197	373
Mountmellick	Comm	Laois		4,735	8	592	2,998	2.27 (Note: Mountmellick Urban electoral division)	1,321	3,095*	1,737
Bantry	Comm	Cork		3,348	10	335	3,348	10 (Note: Bantry Urban electoral division)	335	2,645	—
Muine Bheag (Muinebeag, Bagenalstown)	Comm	Carlow		2,950	7	421	2,775	2.88 (Note: Muinebeag (Bagenalstown) Urban electoral division)	964	2,193	175
Boyle	Comm	Roscommon		2,588	11	235	1,459	2.98 (Note: Boyle Urban electoral division)	490	2,500*	1,129
Ballyshannon	Comm	Donegal		2,503	10	250	1,855	3.43 (Note: Ballyshannon Urban electoral division)	541	2,324*	648
Cootehill	Comm	Cavan		2,123	6	354	1,592	1.82 (Note: Cootehill Urban electoral division)	875	1,795*	531
Ballybay	Comm	Monaghan		1,461	—	—	298	0.25 (Note: Ballybay Urban electoral division)	1,192	1,218*	1,163
Belturbet	Comm	Cavan		1,407	—	—	1,378	4.38 (Note: Belturbet Urban electoral division)	315	1,296	29
Lismore	Comm	Waterford		1,369	—	—	732	0.57 (Note: Lismore electoral division)	1,284	1,138*	637
Kilkee	Comm	Clare		1,139	—	—	1,037	5.25 (Note: Kilkee electoral division)	198	1,063	102
Granard	Comm	Longford		1,021	—	—	1,021	8.12 (Note: Granard Urban electoral division)	126	911	—

== Map ==
City · Borough · Town

== See also ==
- Local government in the Republic of Ireland explains the powers of former municipal councils
- List of urban areas in the Republic of Ireland includes non-municipal towns and villages
