= Cutbush =

Village in County Kildare, Ireland

Cutbush An Tom Gearrtha
- Village
- Location in Ireland
- Coordinates: 53°07′22″N 6°49′50″W
- Country: Ireland
- Province: Leinster
- County: County Kildare
- Time zone: UTC+0 (WET)
  - Summer (DST): UTC-1 (IST (WEST))

Cutbush or Cut Bush (Irish: An Tom Gearrtha) is a village in County Kildare, Ireland. It is south of The Curragh, 6 km south-east of Kildare town and 6 km south-west of Newbridge. The village is in the civil parish of Ballysax, which had a population of 342 as of the 2016 census.

== Facilities ==
The village is situated at a crossroads that includes Vaughan's pub, known as "The Bush" and St. Brigid's National School. School bus services are available to Newbridge Educate Together Primary School, to the adjacent Gaelscoil Chill Dara, both located on the edge of The Curragh in Newbridge and to secondary schools in Kildare town and Newbridge.

== History and architecture ==
Cutbush was known as Cearna as recently as the mid 19th century, with some Irish reportedly still spoken there at that time.

The village is home to two buildings previously used as national schools, including an early Board of Works design for the Board of Education, located on the Cutbush Road, constructed in the 1920s, as well as an early primary school building dating from the 1830s, now renovated as a private home. Cutbush has also retained (in its original location) a manual waterpump dating from c.1900 that supplied the village with a communal water source.

== Sport ==
Cutbush has a soccer team, Bush Celtic Soccer Club, which plays in the Kildare & District Football League. Suncroft GAA is the local Gaelic Athletic Association club, and has adult and children's sections. Suncroft also has a running club, known as the Suncroft Athletics Club. The village is close to The Curragh, where there are horse riding lessons, the Curragh Golf Club and facilities at the Curragh Camp including circuit training sessions (open to the public) and a members swimming pool (possible to join as a local resident).

== Popular culture ==
The village's name features in a song by Christy Moore called "Welcome to the Cabaret" - the quote being

"Well there’s people here upon my word from every corner of the world
Portarlington, Portlaoise and Tullamore
From Two Mile House and Poulaphouca
From Blacktrench, Cutbush and Boolea
Such a crowd I’ve never seen before"

== See also ==
- List of towns and villages in Ireland
