= 2026 Longford Senior Hurling Championship =

- Dates: 2026
- Teams: 3
- Sponsor: Cablecomm
- Champions: Longford Slashers (14th title)
- Runners-up: Wolfe Tones

The 2026 Cablecomm Longford Senior Hurling Championship will be the 50th staging of the Longford Senior Hurling Championship since its establishment by the Longford County Board in 1904.

Three teams will contest the Longford Senior Hurling Championship. All three teams will enter the round-robin stage stage, playing each other in home or away fixtures, guaranteeing at least two championship games. The top two teams after three rounds play in a lone final.

Longford Slashers enters the championship as the defending champions.

The final was contested between Longford Slashers and Wolfe Tones. with an eighth consecutive appearance for Longford Slashers, and a third straight meeting between both clubs in the decider. Longford Slashers won the contest 1-22 to 1-12 to retain their championship, and win their 14th overall.

== Participating teams ==
Team	Location	Championships	Last Championship
Clonguish Gaels	Newtownforbes	7	2023
Longford Slashers	Longford	13	2025
Wolfe Tones	Edgeworthstown	21	2024

== Group stage ==
=== Group stage table ===
Advance to final

Team	Matches				Score			Pts
Team	Pld	W	D	L	For	Against	Diff	Pts
Longford Slashers	2	2	0	0	66	23	43	4
Wolfe Tones	2	1	0	1	50	45	5	2
Clonguish Gaels	2	0	0	2	18	66	-48	0

==== Fixtures ====
11 Jul Round 1	Longford Slashers	3-25 - 0-5	Clonguish Gaels	C & D Devine Park
				Referee: James Clarke

31 Jul Round 2	Wolfe Tones	1-15 - 5-17	Longford Slashers	Allen Park
				Referee: John Emmo

22 Aug Round 3	Wolfe Tones	4-20 - 1-10	Clonguish Gaels	Michael Fay Park
				Referee: James McGrath

== Final ==
Final	Longford Slashers	1-22 - 1-12	Wolfe Tones	Pearse Park
		Report
