= 1963 O'Byrne Cup =

Gaelic football competition, Leinster, Ireland

Tournament details
- Province: Leinster
- Year: 1963
- Trophy: O'Byrne Cup
- Date: 24 March — 8 December
- Teams: 12

Winners
- Champions: Louth (1st win)
- Captain: Jimmy Mulroy

Runners-up
- Runners-up: Longford

The 1963 O'Byrne Cup was a Gaelic football tournament contested by the county teams of Leinster GAA. It was the 10th staging of the competition that was first held in 1954, with the aim of starting a fund for injured footballers.

Louth won the competition after defeating Longford in the final, played at the Gaelic Grounds in Drogheda.

== Format ==
The tournament was contested on a knockout basis. First-round byes were awarded to Dublin, Louth, Meath and Westmeath.

== Matches ==
=== Preliminary Round ===
24 March	Wicklow	3-08 - 1-01	Kilkenny	Ashford

24 March	Kildare	1-02 - 1-01	Carlow	St Conleth's Park

24 March	Longford	0-09 - 1-02	Offaly	Pearse Park

21 April	Wexford	0-06 - 1-02	Laois	St Patrick's Park, Enniscorthy

=== Quarter-Finals ===
24 March	Louth	3-08 - 0-02	Dublin	Gaelic Grounds

24 March	Meath	1-05 - 0-07	Westmeath	Páirc Tailteann

29 September	Kildare	2-07 - 2-07	Wexford	St Conleth's Park

13 October	Longford	2-09 - 0-07	Wicklow	Baltinglass

27 October (Replay)	Wexford	0-11 - 0-02	Kildare	Bellefield

=== Semi-Finals ===
11 August	Louth	2-10 - 0-10	Meath	Páirc Tailteann

1 December	Longford	0-06 - 0-04	Kildare	Pearse Park

=== Final ===
8 December	Louth	1-10 - 0-10	Longford	Gaelic Grounds
	Lennon 0-3, Dawe 0-2, McDermott 0-1, Jimmy McDonnell 0-1, O'Kane 0-1			Referee: K. Kenworthy (Dublin)

GK	1	Andy Kieran (Naomh Mhuire)
RCB	2	Donal Matthews (Mattock Rangers)
FB	3	Leslie Toal (Clan na Gael)
LCB	4	Paddy Leech (Newtown Blues)
RHB	5	John Doyle (Dundalk Young Irelands)
CHB	6	Frank Lynch (Geraldines)
LHB	7	Val Murphy (Newtown Blues)
MF	8	Mick Gartlan (Roche Emmets)
MF	9	Jimmy Mulroy (Newtown Blues) (c)
RHF	10	Jim Sheelan (St Patrick's)
CHF	11	Jim Judge (Newtown Blues)
LHF	12	Liam Leech (Newtown Blues)
RCF	13	Eamonn Burgess (Good Counsel, Dublin)
FF	14	Alfie Monk (Naomh Mhuire)
LCF	15	Muckle McKeown (O'Raghallaighs)
Substitutes:
	16	Kevin Beahan (St Mary's) for McKeown
	17	Frank Clarke (Newtown Blues) for Sheelan
	18	John Woods (Cooley Kickhams) for Matthews

GK	1	Liam Flynn (Clonguish)
RCB	2	Séamus Flynn (Clonguish)
FB	3	Larry Gillen (Civil Service, Dublin)
LCB	4	Billy Morgan (Killoe Young Emmets)
RHB	5	Brendan Barden (Clonguish)
CHB	6	John Donlon (Cashel)
LHB	7	P. M. Gillen (Ardagh St Patrick's)
MF	8	Liam Higgins (Colmcille)
MF	9	Pat Moriarty (Longford Slashers)
RHF	10	Roddy Carter (Ballymahon)
CHF	11	Bobby Burns (Granard St Mary's)
LHF	12	Brendan Gilmore (Rathcline)
RCF	13	Mickey Burns (Granard St Mary's)
FF	14	Seán Donnelly (St Vincent's, London)
LCF	15	Mick Hopkins (Clonguish) (c)
