= 2025 Longford Senior Hurling Championship =

- Dates: 3 Aug - 11 Oct 2025
- Teams: 3
- Sponsor: Cablecomm
- Champions: Longford Slashers (13th title)
- Runners-up: Wolfe Tones

Tournament statistics
- Matches played: 5
- Goals scored: 18 (3.6 per match)
- Points scored: 203 (40.6 per match)
- Top scorer(s): Evan Tully (1-24)

The 2025 Longford Senior Hurling Championship was the 49th staging of the Longford Senior Hurling Championship since its establishment by the Longford County Board in 1904. The Championship will run from 3 August, and concludes on the 28th September.

Three teams contested the Longford Senior Hurling Championship. All three teams entered the round-robin stage stage, playing each other once home and away, guaranteeing at least two championship games. The top two teams after three rounds play in a lone final. Wolfe Tones and Clonguish Gaels were drawn for the opening game, giving Longford Slashers a first round bye.

Wolfe Tones entered the championship as the defending champions,

The final was contested between Longford Slashers and Wolfe Tones at Pearse Park in Longford. This was Longford's seventh straight appearance, and a rematch of last year's final. Longford won the contest 1-16 - 0–15 in a replay, for their first championship since 2021, and their 13th overall.

== Participating teams ==
Team	Location	Championships	Last Championship
Clonguish Gaels	Newtownforbes	7	2023
Longford Slashers	Longford	12	2021
Wolfe Tones	Edgeworthstown	21	2024

== Group stage ==
=== Group stage table ===
Advance to final

Team	Matches				Score			Pts
Team	Pld	W	D	L	For	Against	Diff	Pts
Longford Slashers	2	2	0	0	66	21	45	4
Wolfe Tones	2	1	0	1	43	42	1	2
Clonguish Gaels	2	0	0	2	22	68	-46	0

==== Fixtures ====
3 Aug Round 1	Longford Slashers	4-17 - 1-9	Wolfe Tones	Allen Park
	Michael Mulcahy (2-2), Reuben Murray (0-6), Sean Tiernan (1-2), Stephen Murray (1-0), David Buckley (0-3), Johnny Casey (0-2), Harry Mulvihill (0-2)	Report	Cillian Courtney (1-0), Dylan Hutchinson (0-3), Ronan Courtney (0-2), Evan Tully (0-2), James Connell (0-1), Martin Coyle (0-1)	Referee: TBC

24 Aug Round 2	Clonguish Gaels	0-9 - 4-25	Longford Slashers	C & D Devine Park
	Dan Crossan (0-5), Paul Barden (0-2), Oisin Flanagan (0-1), Eamon Nertney (0-1)	Report	Sean Tiernan (3-9), Matthew Hawes (0-5), David Buckley (1-1), Darragh Caslin (0-3), Reuben Murray (0-3), Diarmuid Caslin (0-1), Niall Hawes (0-1), Stephen Murray (0-1), Karl Murray (0-1)	Referee: James McGrath

7 Sep Round 3	Wolfe Tones	5-16 - 1-10	Clonguish Gaels	Michael Fay Park
	Ronan Courtney (2-2), Evan Tully (1-5), Maitiú O’ Donohoe (0-7), Liam Browne (1-0), Killian Courtney (0-1), Dylan Hutchinson (0-1)	Report	Dan Crossan (0-6), Declan Lee (1-0), Stephen Gregg (0-2), Paul Barden (0-1), Alan Sorohan (0-1),	Referee: James Judge

== Knockout stage ==
=== Bracket ===
Final
1	Longford Slashers	2-13, 1-16 (R)
2	Wolfe Tones	0-19, 0-15 (R)

==== Fixtures ====
28 Sep Final	Longford Slashers	2-13 - 0-19	Wolfe Tones	Pearse Park, Longford
	Niall Hawes (1-1), David Buckley, (0-4), Reuben Murray (0-4), Darragh Caslin (1-0), Micheal Mulcahy (0-2), Johnny Casey (0-1), Sean Tiernan (0-1)	Report	Evan Tully (0-14), Killian Courtney (0-2), Ronan Courtney (0-2), Liam Browne (0-1),	Referee: James Clarke

11 Oct Replay	Longford Slashers	1-16 - 0-15	Wolfe Tones	Pearse Park, Longford
		Report		Referee: James McGrath
