= 2024 Longford Senior Hurling Championship =

- Dates: 27 July - 22 September 2024
- Teams: 3
- Champions: Wolfe Tones (21st title); Cathal Mullane (captain); John Lynam (manager)
- Runners-up: Longford Slashers; Reuben Murray (captain) (captain); Niall Ward (manager)

Tournament statistics
- Matches played: 4
- Goals scored: 13 (3.25 per match)
- Points scored: 159 (39.75 per match)
- Top scorer(s): Cathal Mullane (1-30)

The 2024 Longford Senior Hurling Championship was the 48th staging of the Longford Senior Hurling Championship since its establishment by the Longford County Board in 1904.

Three teams currently contest the Longford Senior Hurling Championship. All three teams enter the round-robin stage stage, playing each other once, guaranteeing at least two championship games. The top two teams after three rounds play in a lone final. Wolfe Tones and Clonguish Gaels were drawn for the opening game, giving Longford Slashers a first round bye.

Clonguish Gaels enter the championship as the defending 2023 champions, but were eliminated at the group stage, losing both games.

The final would see Longford Slashers and Wolfe Tones meet at Pearse Park. Wolfe Tones won the championship by a score of 2–15 to 3-10, their first in four years, for a record 21st time.

== Participating teams ==
Team	Location	Championships	Last Championship
Clonguish Gaels	Newtownforbes	7	2023
Longford Slashers	Longford	12	2021
Wolfe Tones	Edgeworthstown	20	2020

== Group stage ==
=== Group stage table ===
Advance to final

Team	Matches				Score			Pts
Team	Pld	W	D	L	For	Against	Diff	Pts
Longford Slashers	2	2	0	0	39	23	16	4
Wolfe Tones	2	1	0	1	47	39	8	2
Clonguish Gaels	2	0	0	2	33	47	-14	0

==== Fixtures ====
27 Jul Round 1	Wolfe Tones	5-13 - 0-19	Clonguish Gaels	Michael Fay Park
	Ronan Courtney (3-1), Cathal Mullane (1-8), Tiarnan Hussey (1-2), Liam Browne (0-1), Martin Coyle (0-1)	Report	Joe O’Brien (0-12), Eugene Kiernan (0-3), Dan Crossan (0-2), Paul Barden (0-1), Stephen Gregg (0-1)	Referee: Joseph McDermott

18 Aug Round 2	Wolfe Tones	1-16 - 0-20	Longford Slashers	Bertie Allen Park
	Cathal Mullane (0-11), John Mulhern (1-0), Dylan Hutchinson (0-2), Jack Belton (0-1), Killian Courtney (0-1), Ronan Courtney (0-1),	Report	David Buckley (0-10), Johnny Casey (0-3), Darragh Caslin (0-2), Matthew Hawes (0-1) Niall Hawes (0-1), Micheál Mulcahy (0-1), Jack Horgan Swaris (0-1), Sean Tiernan (0-1)	Referee: Francis Kelly

8 Sep Round 3	Clonguish Gaels	1-11 - 1-16	Longford Slashers	C&D Devine Park
	Joe O’Brien (1-6), Matthew Flynn (0-2), Paul Barden (0-1), David Gregg (0-1) Stephen Gregg (0-1)	Report	David Buckley (1-3), Micheal Mulcahy (0-4), Karl Murray (0-2), Sean Tiernan (0-2), Darragh Caslin (0-1), Matthew Hawes (0-1), Niall Hawes (0-1), Daire Regan (0-1), Jack Horgan Swaris (0-1)	Referee: Francis Kelly

== Knockout stage ==
=== Bracket ===
Final
Sep 22
1	Longford Slashers	3-10
2	Wolfe Tones	2-15

==== Fixtures ====
Sep 22 Final	Longford Slashers	3-10 - 2-15	Wolfe Tones	Pearse Park, Longford
	David Buckley (0-5), Reuben Murray (0-4), Ronan Sheahan (1-0), Sean Tiernan (1-0), Niall Hawes (1-0), Karl Murray (0-1)	Report	Cathal Mullane (0-11), Killian Courtney (1-1), Dylan Hutchinson (1-0), Jack Belton (0-1), Martin Coyle (0-1), Ronan Courtney (0-1)
