= David Barden =

Irish hurler and Gaelic footballer

Personal information
- Born: County Longford, Ireland
- Height: 6 ft 1 in (185 cm)

Sport
- Sport: Gaelic football
- Position: Midfield/Forward
Club
- Years: Club
- Clonguish
Club titles
	Football	Hurling
Longford titles	3	3
Inter-county
- Years: County
- 2002 - 2013: Longford
Inter-county titles
- NFL: 2

David Barden is a Gaelic footballer from County Longford, Ireland. He was a member of the Longford county team between 2002 and 2013. He won two O'Byrne Shield medals in 2006 and 2007. In 2011, he helped Longford overcome Roscommon in the National Football League Div 4 final at Croke Park. In 2012, Longford were back at Croke Park, this time for the Div 3 final and again won beating Wexford.

He played his club football with Clonguish with whom he won 3 Longford Senior Football Championships in 2003, 2004, and 2009. He also plays hurling with the club and won Longford Senior Hurling Championships in 2003, 2005, and 2006.

== Honours ==
- 3 Longford Senior Football Championships (2003, 2004, 2009)
- 3 Longford Senior Hurling Championships (2003, 2005, 2006)
- 2 O'Bryne Cup Shields (2006, 2007)
- 1 National Football League Division 4 (2011)
- 1 National Football League Division 3 (2012)
