= Paul Barden (Gaelic footballer) =

Longford hurler and Gaelic footballer

Personal information
- Born: 1 July 1980 (age 46) County Longford, Ireland
- Height: 6 ft 1 in (185 cm)

Sport
- Position: Forward
Club titles
| | Football | Hurling |
| Longford titles | 3 | 5 |
Inter-county
- Years: County
- 1999 - 2015: Longford
Inter-county titles
| | Football | Hurling |
| League titles | 2 | |

Paul Barden (born 1 July 1980) is a former Gaelic footballer who played at senior level for the Longford county team from October 1998 until February 2015 when he announced his retirement. He was the longest serving inter-county player in the country until his retirement. He won an O'Byrne Cup medal with them in 2000, he also won 2 O'Byrne Shield medals in 2006 and 2007. He was also a member of the Ireland international rules football team in 2002 and 2006. He also won a Railway Cup with Leinster in 2001 and 2002. In 2011, he captained Longford to victory over Roscommon in the National Football League Div 4 final at Croke Park and in 2012, Longford were back at Croke Park, this time for the Division 3 final and again won beating Wexford with Barden once again captain.

He plays his club football with Clonguish with whom he won 3 Longford Senior Football Championships in 2003, 2004 and 2009. He also plays hurling with the club and won Longford Senior Hurling Championships in 2003, 2005, 2006 and 2019 .

In 2020 he was voted the best Longford Footballer of the past 50 years (1970–2020) in an Irish Independent poll of top 20 Longford footballers.

== Honours ==
- 3 Longford Senior Football Championships (2003, 2004, 2009)
- 5 Longford Senior Hurling Championships (2003, 2005, 2006, 2012, 2019)
- 2 Railway Cups (2001, 2002)
- 2 O'Bryne Cup Shields (2006, 2007)
- 1 O'Byrne Cup (1999)
- 1 National Football League Division 4 (2011) [c]
- 1 National Football League Division 3 (2012) [c]
- 1 May Player of the Month (2012)
