= 2023 Longford Senior Hurling Championship =

Hurling competition

- Dates: 8 July - 10 September 2023
- Teams: 3
- Champions: Clonguish Gaels (7th title); Stephen Gregg (captain); John O'Brien (manager)
- Runners-up: Longford Slashers; Reuben Murray (captain); Niall Ward (manager)

Tournament statistics
- Matches played: 4
- Goals scored: 9 (2.25 per match)
- Points scored: 104 (23 per match)

The 2023 Longford Senior Hurling Championship was the 47th staging of the Longford Senior Hurling Championship since its establishment by the Longford County Board in 1904.

Three teams contest the Longford Senior Hurling Championship. Clonguish Gaels enter the championship as the defending champions. Longford Slashers and Wolfe Tones (Mostrim) round out the field.

The Championship is played on a round-robin format between the three clubs involved. Each team plays the other once in a three-game system, guaranteeing at least two championship games. Top two teams after three rounds play in a lone final. There is no relegation.

The final would see Longford Slashers and Clonguish Gaels meet at Pearse Park, in a repeat of last year's final. Clonguish Gaels defeated Longford Slashers by 2-14 to 1-14, winning back-to-back titles and their seventh overall.

Clonguish Gaels represented Longford in the All-Ireland Junior Club Hurling Championship, losing out to St Fechins (Louth) in Round 1 on 28th October 2023.

== Participating teams ==
Team	Location	Championship titles	Last championship title
Clonguish Gaels	Newtownforbes	6	2022
Longford Slashers	Longford	12	2021
Wolfe Tones	Edgeworthstown	20	2020

== Group stage ==
=== Group stage table ===
Advance to final

Team	Matches				Score			Pts
Team	Pld	W	D	L	For	Against	Diff	Pts
Longford Slashers	2	2	0	0	23	12	11	4
Clonguish Gaels	2	1	0	1	31	36	-5	2
Wolfe Tones	2	0	0	2	13	19	-6	0

==== Fixtures ====
8 July Round 1	Longford Slashers	W/O - 0-0	Wolfe Tones (Mostrim)	Allen Park

15 July Round 2	Longford Slashers	3-14 - 1-9	Clonguish Gaels	C & D Devine Park

19 August Round 3	Wolfe Tones (Mostrim)	1-10 - 1-16	Clonguish Gaels	Michael Fay Park

== Knockout stage ==
=== Bracket ===
Final
10 September
1	Longford Slashers	1-14
2	Clonguish Gaels	2-14

==== Fixtures ====
10 September Final	Longford Slashers	1-14 - 2-14	Clonguish Gaels	Pearse Park, Longford
	R Murray 0-9; M Mulcahy 1-1; Buckley 0-3; E Donnellan 0-1.	Report	B Hanley 1-3; S Gregg 1-3; J O’Brien 0-4; M Flynn 0-2; C Corcoran 0-1; D Crossan 0-1.	Referee: Francis Kelly
