= Enda Williams =

Irish hurler and Gaelic footballer

Personal information
- Native name: Éanna Mac Uilliam (Irish)
- Born: County Dublin, Ireland

Sport
- Sport: Gaelic Football
- Position: Centre Back
Club
- Years: Club
- 2002-: Clonguish
Club titles
	Football	Hurling
Longford titles	3	3
Inter-county
- Years: County
- 2004-2011 2012-2013 2014-: Longford; Leitrim; Longford
Inter-county titles
- NFL: 1

Enda Williams (born 1985) is a Gaelic footballer from County Longford, Ireland. He was a panel member of the Longford county team from 2004 to 2011. In 2012, he joined the Leitrim county team, where he spent 18 months before announcing his return to Longford in November 2013.

He was captain of the Longford minor team that won the 2002 Leinster Minor Championship when they beat Meath in the final. He then moved on to the Under 21 side and played in the 2003 Leinster Final but lost out to Dublin in the final. He played in an O'Byrne Cup final in 2007 but lost out to Dublin again, he also won 2 O'Byrne Shield medals in 2006 and 2007. In 2011, he helped Longford overcome Roscommon in the National Football League Div 4 final at Croke Park.

He played his club football with Clonguish with whom he won 3 Longford Senior Football Championships in 2003, 2004 and 2009. He also plays hurling with the club and won Longford Senior Hurling Championships in 2003, 2005 and 2006.
