= Seán Donnelly =

Irish Gaelic footballer and manager (1940–2024

Personal information
- Native name: Seán Ó Donnaile (Irish)
- Born: 1940 Longford, Ireland
- Died: 2 January 2024 (aged 83) Longford, Ireland
- Occupation: Secondary school teacher

Sport
- Sport: Gaelic football
- Position: Left corner-forward
Club
- Years: Club
- 1959–1982: Longford Slashers
Club titles
- Longford titles: 4
College
- Years: College
- 1959–1964: University College Galway
College titles
- Sigerson titles: 3
Inter-county
Years	County	Apps (scores)
1959–1973	Longford	29 (12–7)
Inter-county titles
- Leinster titles: 1
- All-Irelands: 0
- NFL: 1

Seán Donnelly (1940 – 2 January 2024) was an Irish Gaelic footballer, administrator and manager. He played at club level with Longford Slashers and at inter-county level with the Longford senior football team. Donnelly also served as county board officer and manager.

== Playing career ==
Donnelly first played Gaelic football to a high standard as a schoolboy at St Mel's College. He later became a member of the University College Galway team that reached four successive Sigerson Cup finals between 1961 and 1964, winning three titles in 1961, 1963 and 1964. Donnelly's performances also earned his inclusion on the Combined Universities team.

At club level, Donnelly joined the newly-formed Longford Slashers and won a Longford MFC medal in 1958. His adult club career lasted for nearly 25 years and spanned four decades, during which time he won Longford SFC medals in 1959, 1961, 1971 and as player-manager in 1975. Donnelly also spent some summers during the early part of his club career playing in England and he won a London SFC medal with the St Vincent's club in 1961. He brought his club career to an end after winning the Longford JFC title in 1982.

Donnelly first appeared on the inter-county scene with Longford as a member of the junior team in 1959. That year he also made his senior team debut in a tournament game. Donnelly was an ever-present member of the team during Longford's most successful era. After winning an O'Byrne Cup title in 1965, he was part of the team that defeated Galway and New York to win the National League Division 1 title in 1966. Two years later, Donnelly added a Leinster SFC medal to his collection after Longford claimed their first ever title. He captained the team to the National League Division 2 title in 1972. Donnelly retired from the inter-county game in 1973.

== Administrative career ==
At the height of playing career, Donnelly became involved in the administrative affairs of the GAA. He served as secretary of the Longford County Board from 1968 to 1977. During his tenure he was heavily involved in organisation of Longford's inaugural Scór. Donnelly also served as manager of the Longford senior team for the 1975 season.

== Personal life and death ==
Born in 1940, Donnelly received his primary education at Drumlish NS and Melview, before he attended St Mel's College. He completed a degree in Arts and Commerce at University College Galway. He later spent 35 years on the teaching staff of St Mel's College. Donnelly was named in the left corner-forward position on the Longford Team of the Millennium.

Donnelly died on 2 January 2024, at the age of 83.

== Honours ==
University College Galway

- Sigerson Cup: 1961, 963, 1964

St Vincent's

- London Senior Football Championship: 1961

Longford Slashers

- Longford Senior Football Championship: 1959, 1961, 1971, 1975
- Longford Junior Football Championship: 1982
- Longford Minor Football Championship: 1958

Longford

- Leinster Senior Football Championship: 1968
- National Football League Division 1: 1965–66
- National Football League Division 2: 1971–72 (c)
- O'Byrne Cup: 1965
