= William O'Loughlin =

William O'Loughlin may refer to:

- William O'Loughlin (c. 1850–1912), surgeon who died on the Titanic. See crew of the Titanic
- Billy O'Loughlin, Gaelic footballer
