= John Heneghan (Gaelic footballer) =

Irish Gaelic footballer (1946–2026)

Personal information
- Native name: Seán Ó hÉanacháin (Irish)
- Born: 1946 Ballymahon, County Longford, Ireland
- Died: 30 January 2026 (aged 79) Mullingar, County Westmeath, Ireland
- Occupation: Business owner

Sport
- Sport: Gaelic Football
- Position: Goalkeeper
Clubs
- Years: Club
- Ballymahon; Naomh Mhuire
Club titles
- London titles: 1
Inter-county
Years	County	Apps (scores)
1965–1970	Longford	11 (0–00)
Inter-county titles
- Leinster titles: 1
- All-Irelands: 0
- NFL: 1

John Heneghan (1946 – 30 January 2026) was an Irish Gaelic football player and selector. At club level, he played with Ballymahon and Naomh Mhuire and at inter-county level with the Longford senior football team.

== Playing career ==
Heneghan first played Gaelic football at juvenile and underage levels with the Ballymahon club. He made his first appearance for the club's intermediate team in 1966, however, he also emigrated to London that year and spent the next eight years lining out with the Naomh Mhuire club. Heneghan won a London SFC medal in 1968.

At inter-county level with Longford, Heneghan made his senior team debut as a 19-year-old in September 1965. After winning an O'Byrne Cup title that year, he was part of the team that beat Galway and New York to win the National League Division 1 title in 1966. He was also part of the under-21 team that reached the Leinster U21FC final for the very first time in 1966.

Two years later, Heneghan added a Leinster SFC medal to his collection after Longford claimed their first ever title. He was also included on the Leinster team for the Railway Cup in 1969.

== Post-playing career ==
Heneghan served as a sepector with Longford's senior team in 1986. He was chosen as goalkeeper on the Longford Team of the Millennium in 2000. Heneghan died on 30 January 2026, at the age of 79.

== Honours ==
Naomh Mhuire

- London Senior Football Championship: 1968

Longford

- Leinster Senior Football Championship: 1968
- National Football League: 1965–66
- O'Byrne Cup: 1965
