= Gareth Ghee =

Longford hurler

Personal information
- Born: Longford, County Longford

Sport
- Sport: Hurling
- Position: Forward
Club
- Years: Club
- 1990s–2000s: Longford Slashers
Club titles
	Football	Hurling
Longford titles	3	2
Inter-county
- Years: County
- 2000s: Longford
Inter-county titles
- Leinster titles: 0
- NHL: 0

Gareth Ghee is a hurler from County Longford, Ireland. He was Longford's top scorer for a number of years. In 2010, he was a member of the Longford team that beat Donegal to win the Lory Meagher Cup. He scored 0–8 in the game and later won the Lory Meagher GPA Player of the Year. He played in two Leinster JHC finals in 2003 and 2004, losing both to Meath.

He played his club hurling with Longford Slashers and won Longford SHC medals in 2000 and 2001. He has also won Longford SFC medals in 2010, 2011 and 2013.
