= Longford Ladies' Senior Football Championship =

Annual ladies' gaelic football competition in Ireland

Longford Senior Ladies' Football Championship
- Code: Ladies' Gaelic Football
- Founded: 1982
- Region: Longford LGFA (GAA)
- Title holders: Longford Slashers (8th title)
- Most titles: Killoe & Longford Slashers (8 titles)

The Longford Ladies' Senior Football Championship is the senior Ladies' Gaelic Football competition featuring clubs affiliated to Longford LGFA.

Killoe and Longford Slashers are the competitions most successful clubs, having won 8 titles each.

Longford Slashers are the reigning champions, having defeated Clonguish in the 2025 final.

== Roll of honour ==
| # | Club | Titles | Years won |
|---|---|---|---|
| 1 | Longford Slashers | 8 | 1983, 2019, 2020, 2021, 2022, 2023, 2024, 2025 |
| 1 | Killoe | 8 | 2006, 2008, 2010, 2011, 2012, 2013, 2014, 2016 |
| 3 | Clonguish | 7 | 1989, 2004, 2005, 2007, 2009, 2015, 2017 |
| 4 | Ballymore | 5 | 1995, 1997, 1998, 1999, 2003 |
| 5 | St Helen's | 4 | 1990, 1992, 1993, 1994 |
| 6 | Rathcline | 3 | 2000, 2001, 2002 |
| 7 | Carrickedmond | 2 | 1987, 2018 |
| 7 | Granard | 2 | 1985, 1986 |
| 7 | Ardagh | 2 | 1982, 1984 |
| 10 | St Helens/Rathcline | 1 | 1996 |
| 10 | Granard/Abbeylara | 1 | 1991 |
| 10 | St Annes | 1 | 1988 |

== Finals listed by year ==
| Year | Winner | Score | Runners up | Score |
|---|---|---|---|---|
| 2025 | Longford Slashers | 5-15 | Clonguish | 0-14 |
| 2024 | Longford Slashers | 1-09 | Clonguish | 1-06 |
| 2023 | Longford Slashers | 0-11 | Clonguish | 0-07 |
| 2022 | Longford Slashers | 0-10 | Clonguish | 1-06 |
| 2021 | Longford Slashers | 2-09 | Carrickedmond | 1-11 |
| 2020 | Longford Slashers | 2-15 | Carrickedmond | 1-09 |
| 2019 | Longford Slashers | 4-09 | Clonguish | 2-09 |
| 2018 | Carrickedmond | 5-07 | Killoe | 0-12 |
| 2017 | Clonguish | 0-09 (Replay); 0-09 | Mostrim | 0-06 (Replay); 0-09 |
| 2016 | Killoe | 1-14 | Mostrim | 1-03 |
| 2015 | Clonguish | 1-08 | Killoe | 0-10 |
| 2014 | Killoe | 3-10 | Ballymore | 1-11 |
| 2013 | Killoe | 2-14 | Clonguish | 2-05 |
| 2012 | Killoe | 2-14 | Clonguish | 2-04 |
| 2011 | Killoe | 1-12 | Ballymore | 2-08 |
| 2010 | Killoe | 0-11 | Clonguish | 1-04 |
| 2009 | Clonguish | 1-06 | Killoe | 1-05 |
| 2008 | Killoe | 3-09 | Clonguish | 0-07 |
| 2007 | Clonguish | 1-11 | Killoe | 1-06 |
| 2006 | Killoe | 3-14 | Clonguish | 1-07 |
| 2005 | Clonguish | 2-11 | Ballymore | 0-10 |
| 2004 | Clonguish | 2-10 | Killoe | 2-08 |
| 2003 | Ballymore | 1-11 | Rathcline | 1-08 |
| 2002 | Rathcline | 2-11 | Killoe | 2-04 |
| 2001 | Rathcline | 3-10 | Clonguish | 0-09 |
| 2000 | Rathcline | 3-04 | Killoe | 2-06 |
| 1999 | Ballymore | 5-9 | Killoe | 4-8 |
| 1998 | Ballymore | 5-13 | Rathcline | 1-14 |
| 1997 | Ballymore | 5-10 | Killoe | 3-6 |
| 1996 | St. Helens/Rathcline | 2-7 | Ballymore | 2-6 |
| 1995 | Ballymore | 0-12 | St. Helens | 1-8 |
| 1994 | St. Helens | 8-8 | Clonguish | 1-4 |
| 1993 | St. Helens | 7-15 | Kenagh | 2-3 |
| 1992 | St. Helens | 8-14 | Carrickedmond | 1-3 |
| 1991 | Granard/Abbeylara | 0-5 | St. Helens | 0-4 |
| 1990 | St. Helens | 2-2 | Carrickedmond | 1-2 |
| 1989 | Clonguish | 3-4 | St. Helens | 2-3 |
| 1988 | St. Annes | 4-0 | Carrickedmond | 3-1 |
| 1987 | Carrickedmond | 4-3 | St. Annes | 1-5 |
| 1986 | Granard | 3-7 | Carrickedmond | 0-1 |
| 1985 | Granard | 4-5 | Legan | 0-0 |
| 1984 | Ardagh | 2-4 | Granard | 0-6 |
| 1983 | Longford Slashers | 2-3 | Éire Óg | 1-3 |
| 1982 | Ardagh | 5-6 | Éire Óg | 0-0 |
