= 2022 Leinster Senior Football Championship final =

- Event: 2022 Leinster Senior Championship
Dublin	Kildare
5–17	1–15
- Date: 28 May 2022
- Venue: Croke Park, Dublin
- Man of the Match: Con O'Callaghan
- Referee: Paddy Neilan (Roscommon)
- Weather: Sunny

The 2022 Leinster Senior Football Championship final was played at Croke Park in Dublin on 28 May 2022. It was contested by Dublin and Kildare. Dublin won a 12th consecutive title.

== Match details ==
28 May 2022
Leinster Final

Dublin	5-17 - 1-15	Kildare
Con O'Callaghan 1-5 (0-1m), Cormac Costello 2-1, Dean Rock 0-4f, John Small and Ciaran Kilkenny 1-0 each, Brian Fenton 0-3, Lee Gannon 0-2, Niall Scully and Aaron Byrne 0-1 each	Report	Jimmy Hyland 1-4 (0-3f), Ben McCormack 0-5 (0-1m), Kevin Feely 0-2 (0-1m), Kevin Flynn, Paul Cribbin, Darragh Kirwan, Paddy Woodgate (0-1f) 0-1 each

Croke Park, Dublin
Attendance: 38,000 (est.)
Referee: Paddy Neilan (Roscommon)

Dublin	Kildare

1	Evan Comerford
2	Eoin Murchan
3	Michael Fitzsimons
4	Lee Gannon
5	John Small
6	Lorcan O’Dell
7	James McCarthy
8	Brian Fenton
9	Tom Lahiff
10	Seán Bugler
11	Brian Howard
12	Ciarán Kilkenny
13	Cormac Costelloo
14	C. O'Callaghan
15	Dean Rock
Substitutes:
26	Niall Scully for O’Dell
22	Cian Murphy for Murchan
17	Aaron Byrne for Rock
24	Jonny Cooper for Lahiff
25	Brian O’Leary for Costello
Manager:
Dessie Farrell

1	M. Donnellan
2	Mick O'Grady
3	Shea Ryan
4	Ryan Houlihan
5	Tony Archbold
6	James Murray
7	Kevin Flynn
8	Kevin Feely
9	Kevin O’Callaghan
10	Alex Beirne
11	Ben McCormack
12	Paul Cribbin
13	Darragh Kirwan
14	Daniel Flynn
15	Jimmy Hyland
Substitutes:
21	Paddy Woodgate for Kirwan
17	David Hyland for Murray
18	Paddy McDermott for Cribbin
26	Darragh Malone for Archbold
24	Fergal Conway for Beirne
Manager:
Glenn Ryan

Man of the Match:
Con O'Callaghan
