= Padraic Davis =

Irish Gaelic footballer and manager

Personal information
- Born: 28\12\75 County Longford, Ireland

Sport
- Sport: Gaelic football
- Position: Forward
Club
- Years: Club
- 1991–present: Fr Manning Gaels
Club titles
- Longford titles: 4
- Leinster titles: 0
- All-Ireland Titles: 0
Inter-county
- Years: County
- 1995–2007: Longford

Padraic Davis is an Irish Gaelic football manager and former player. He played for the Fr Manning Gaels club and the Longford county team. He also managed the Longford county team.

== Playing career ==
Davis played for the Fr Manning Gaels club, winning four Longford Senior Football Championships, three consecutively from 1996 to 1998, and again in 2001.

He played for Longford for 12 years from 1995 to 2007. He was Longford's leading forward for many years in the All-Ireland Senior Football Championship and one of the greatest players the county has ever produced. He won an O'Byrne Cup with Longford in 2000. Davis was placed on the Longford Dream Team of 2000–2020 at left corner forward.

He played for Leinster in the Railway Cup (1998–2004), winning it on two occasions.

== Managerial career ==
After retiring from playing Davis began managing at club and inter-county level. In 2010, he managed his home club St Vincent's to a Longford Minor Football Championship. That same year he was the forwards coach to the Longford minor team which won the Leinster Minor Football Championship. He was manager of the Longford under-21 team, which he led to a Leinster Final in 2011, but lost out to Wexford by a point. He was also Longford junior manager during this time and was a coach/selector with the Longford senior team in 2011, 2012 and 2013, winning Division 3 and 4 National League titles in that period.

In 2015, Davis became manager of Mohill GAA in County Leitrim. During three years at the helm, he won two Senior Championships, two U-21 Championships, as well as three consecutive Senior Leagues.

In the Autumn of 2018, Davis was appointed Longford Senior Football Manager. He won the O’Byrne Cup in 2020, bridging a 20-year gap to their previous one in 2000.He was given a two-year extension in 2020 until the end of 2022. But he stepped down in July 2021 after Longford's heavy loss to Meath in the Leinster Championship, referring to his family, his "property market" job and the difficulties of managing at that level.
