= Séamus Flynn =

Irish Gaelic footballer and manager (1939–2024)

Personal information
- Native name: Séamus Ó Floinn (Irish)
- Born: 1939 Newtown Forbes, County Longford, Ireland
- Died: 13 February 2024 (aged 84) Lanesborough, County Longford, Ireland
- Occupation: Bord na Móna employee

Sport
- Sport: Gaelic football
- Position: Right corner-back
Clubs
- Years: Club
- Clonguish; Harps & Shamrocks; Rathcline
Club titles
- Longford titles: 8
Inter-county
- Years: County
- 1957–1971: Longford
Inter-county titles
- Leinster titles: 1
- All-Irelands: 0
- NFL: 1
- All Stars: 0

Séamus Flynn (1939 – 13 February 2024) was an Irish Gaelic footballer, administrator and manager. He played at club level with Clonguish and at inter-county level with the Longford senior football team. Flynn also served as a county board officer and manager.

== Playing career ==
Flynn first played Gaelic football with Clooneen in the local parish leagues at the age of 14. He also lined out as a schoolboy with Longford Vocational School, with whom he won a vocational schools' title. Flynn received a suspension for playing illegally in Roscommon in 1958. After serving his suspension he returned to playing with Clonguish and won a junior league-championship double in 1959.

After emigrating to England shortly after these victories, Flynn continued to play Gaelic football after joining the Harps & Shamrocks club. He won a Lancashire SFC title in 1961. Flynn returned in 1962, rejoined the Clonguish club and won a Longford SFC title. It was the first of eight such title victories over the course of 12 seasons, with Flynn captaining the team in 1968 and 1972.

Flynn first appeared on the inter-county scene with Longford during a two-year tenure with the minor team in 1956 and 1957. He was just out of the minor grade when he made his senior team debut in an NFL game against Sligo in 1958. Flynn's time in England saw him line out with the Lancashire county team, however, he rejoined the Longford team in 1963 and was an ever-present member during the team's most successful era. After winning an O'Byrne Cup title in 1965, he was part of the team that beat Galway and New York to win the National League Division 1 title in 1966. Two years later, Flynn added a Leinster SFC medal to his collection after Longford claimed their first ever title.

Flynn was the only Longford player to captain Leinster in the Railway Cup. His club career continued following his retirement from the inter-county game in 1971. Flynn brought his club career to an end after winning a Longford JFC medal with Rathcline at the age of 45 in 1984.

== Administrative and coaching career ==
Flynn began his coaching career while he was still a player. He was player-manager when Clonguish won back-to-back Longford SFC titles in 1968 and 1969. Flynn also trained the Kilmore club in Roscommon. He also served as a selector and kitman with the Longford senior team.

Flynn also spent ten years as Longford's delegate to the Leinster Council. He also held a number of positions at county board and club levels, including treasurer of his adopted Rathcline club. Flynn was named in the right corner-back position on the Longford Team of the Millennium.

== Death ==
Flynn died on 13 February 2024, at the age of 84.

== Honours ==
=== Player ===
Clonguish

- Longford Senior Football Championship: 1962, 1963, 1964, 1965, 1968 (c), 1969, 1972 (c), 1973
- Longford Junior Football Championship: 1959

Harp & Shamrocks

- Lancashire Senior Football Championship: 1961

Rathcline

- Longford Junior Football Championship: 1984

Longford

- Leinster Senior Football Championship: 1968
- National Football League Division 1: 1965–66
- O'Byrne Cup: 1965

=== Management ===
Clonguish

- Longford Senior Football Championship: 1968, 1969
