= Glenn Ryan =

Irish Gaelic footballer and manager

Personal information
- Native name: Glenn Ó Riain (Irish)
- Born: 20 October 1972 (age 54) Kildare, Ireland
- Height: 5 ft 11 in (180 cm)

Sport
- Sport: Gaelic football
- Position: Centre back
Club
- Years: Club
- 1980s–: Round Towers
Club titles
- Kildare titles: 3
- Leinster titles: 0
- All-Ireland Titles: 0
Inter-county
- Years: County
- 1990–2006: Kildare
Inter-county titles
- Leinster titles: 2
- All-Irelands: 0
- NFL: 0
- All Stars: 2

Glenn Ryan (born 20 October 1972) is a Gaelic football manager and former player. He was manager of the Kildare county team between 2021 and 2024.

Ryan previously managed Longford and the Kildare under-21 team.

He captained the Kildare team during its most successful period in recent history, leading the Lilywhites to the 1998 All-Ireland Senior Football Championship Final and collecting Leinster medals in 1998 and again in 2000. Ryan's contribution was recognised with All Stars Awards in 1997 and 1998 and a place on the Kildare Team of the Millennium.

He played his club football with Round Towers, winning the county title with them three times.

== Management ==
=== Kildare under-21 team ===
Ryan managed the Kildare under-21 team to a Leinster Under-21 Football Championship in 2008 and went on to the All-Ireland Under 21 Football Championship final only to lose out to Kerry on the day.

=== Longford ===
In October 2008, he took over the Longford senior football team.

In Ryan's first year in charge Longford were knocked out in the first round of the Leinster Senior Football Championship by Wicklow. They then went into the Qualifiers where they beat Leitrim 0–13 to 0–10 before they ran Kerry close in Round 2 going down 1–12 to 0–11.

Ryan's second year in charge once again seen his side go out in the first round in Leinster losing out to Louth, they once again entered the Qualifiers, in round 1 they pulled off the shock of the championship when they beat Mayo 1–12 to 0–14, in Round 2 Down proved too good and ran out 1–14 to 1–10 winners.

2011 started out well for Ryan and Longford when they beat Roscommon by 2–11 to 1–08 to take the National League Div 4 title.

In 2012, Longford again had a good start to the year this time by winning the Div 3 National League title with a win over Wexford giving Ryan and Longford back-to-back titles.

In August 2013, Ryan vacated the Longford senior management role.

=== Kildare ===
On 2 October 2021, following the departure of Kildare's senior football manager Jack O'Connor, the Kildare County Board appointed Ryan as O'Connor's replacement. Kildare followed that announcement with confirmation of the appointment of John Doyle, Dermot Earley Jnr and Anthony Rainbow as selectors.

Kildare contested the 2022 Leinster Senior Football Championship final.

He resigned in 2024.

Sporting positions
Preceded by Jack O'Connor	Kildare Senior Football Manager; 2021–2024	Succeeded by
