= Rathcline =

Rathcline Ráth Claon (Irish)
- Barony
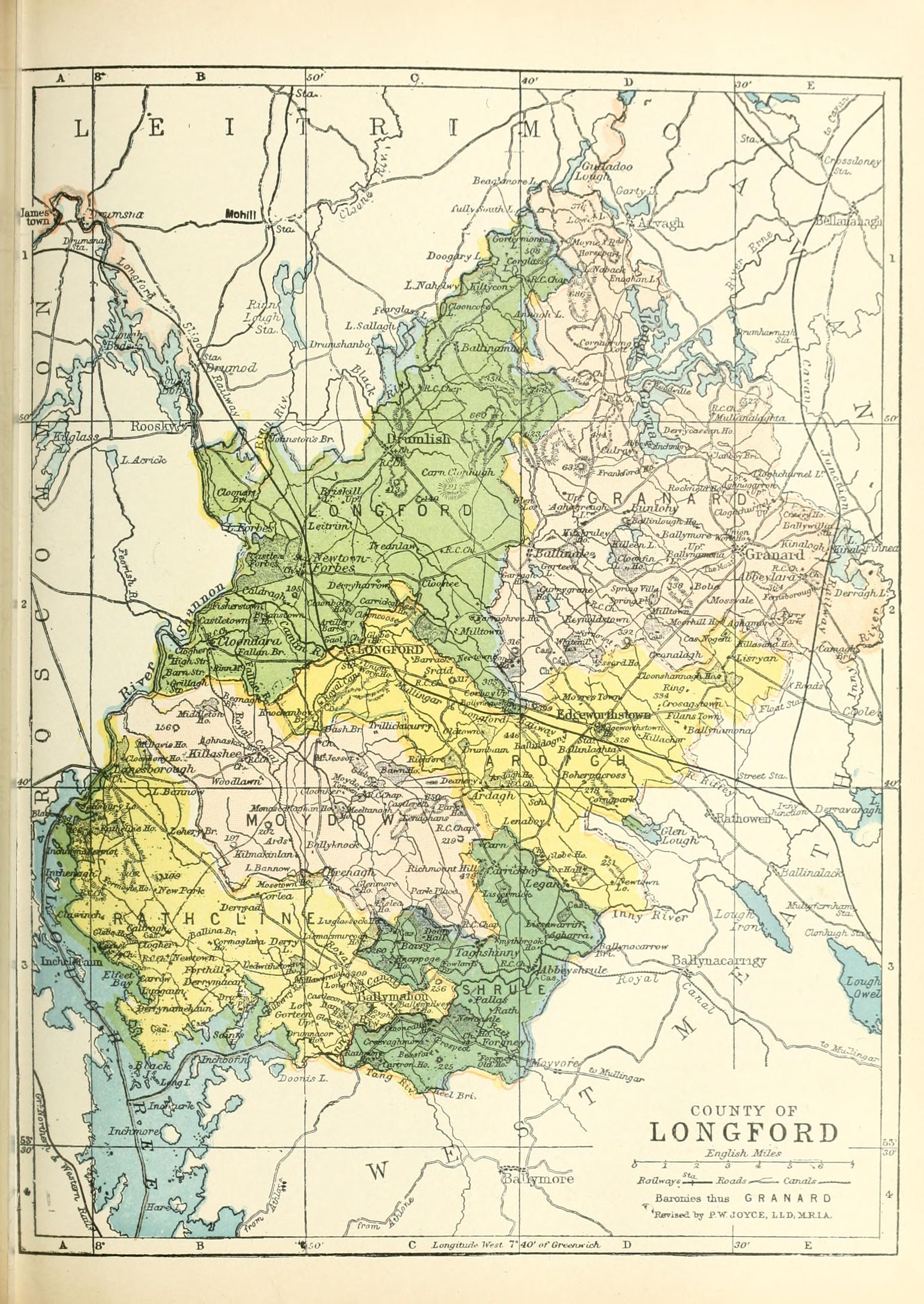
- Baronies of County Longford. Rathcline is shaded yellow.
- Sovereign state: Ireland
- County: Longford

Area
  - Total: 163.58 km^{2} (63.16 sq mi)

Rathcline (/ræ(t)ˈkliːn/; Irish: Ráth Claon) is a barony in County Longford, Ireland.

== Etymology ==
Rathcline takes its name from the townland and parish of Rathcline (from Irish Ráth Claon, "rath on the slope").

== Location ==
Rathcline is located in southwest County Longford, to the east of Lough Ree and north of the River Inny.

== History ==
Rathcline barony was formed from the territories of The Callow (Caladh na hAnghaile, left bank of Shannon, Lanesboro to Ballymahon) and the territory of Clanconnor (part Kilcommoc, part Cashel). Rathcline Castle (near modern Lanesborough) was built around the 9th Century by the Ó Cuinn (O'Quinn) clan. Later it was fought for and taken by the Uí Fhearghail (O'Farrell) clan and subsequently taken over by the Normans around the beginning of the 12th Century. Ó Fachtna (O'Faughny) is also noted as chief of the Callow (Callo) into the 16th century.

== List of settlements ==
Below is a list of settlements in Rathcline:

- Ballymahon
- Keenagh (southern part)
- Lanesborough
- Newtowncashel
