= Billy O'Loughlin =

Gaelic footballer

Sport
- Sport: Gaelic football
Club management
- Years: Club
- 2012–present: Sarsfields Moycullen GAA (Galway)
Inter-county management
- Years: Team
- 2021–: Laois; Longford

Billy O'Loughlin is a Gaelic football manager and player from County Laois. He led Laois to the 2019 Leinster Under-20 Football Championship final. He was appointed manager of the Longford county team in 2021.

== Career ==
O'Loughlin was a selector and coach on DIT's 2013 Sigerson Cup team, which won the competition, while he had previously managed the college's freshers team to All-Irelands in 2008 and 2009. He led Laois to the 2019 Leinster Under-20 Football Championship final. He managed Sarsfields to a Kildare Senior Football Championship semi-final.

In November 2021, O'Loughlin was appointed to the Longford senior management role. The appointment was unexpected and he included handballer Paul Brady in his backroom team as a performance coach. He successfully kept Longford in Division 3 of the National Football league. He stepped down from the Longford managerial role in July 2022 because of other commitments.

O'Loughlin played his club football for Arles–Killeen and St Loman's. He transferred to St Loman's, which is in Westmeath. He played for St Loman's in the final of the 2017 Leinster Senior Club Football Championship. Declan O'Loughlin, a Laois selector during Mick O'Dwyer's time as manager, is his father.

== See also ==
- 2017 Westmeath Senior Football Championship
