= Longford county football team =

Gaelic football team

Longford
- Sport: Football
- Irish: An Longfort
- Nickname(s): Midlanders
- County board: Longford GAA
- Manager: Mike Solan
- Captain: Patrick Fox
- Home venue(s): Pearse Park, Longford

Recent competitive record
- Current All-Ireland status: Leinster (PR) in 2025
- Last championship title: None
- Current NFL Division: 4 (6th in 2025)
- Last league title: 1965–66
First colours	Second colours

The Longford county football team represents Longford in men's Gaelic football and is governed by Longford GAA, the county board of the Gaelic Athletic Association. The team competes in the three major annual inter-county competitions; the All-Ireland Senior Football Championship, the Leinster Senior Football Championship and the National Football League.

Longford's home ground is Pearse Park, Longford. The team's manager is Mike Solan.

The team last won the Leinster Senior Championship in 1968 and the National League in 1966. Longford has never won the All-Ireland Senior Championship.

== Crest and colours ==
The Longford county colours are royal blue and gold. Green and white hooped jerseys were reputedly used by Longford until 1918 when a royal blue jersey with a gold sash was adopted. Around 1930 the sash disappeared but the gold trim was retained.

== History ==
During the 1960s Mick Higgins was the coach of Longford when it won the National Football League (1966) and its first (and at the time of his death only) Leinster Senior Football Championship (SFC) (1968). He also led them to an O'Byrne Cup title in 1965.

Jackie Devine set up two goals for Longford in the last six minutes of the 1968 Leinster SFC final to beat Laois by 3-9 to 1-4, where Seán Donnelly and Jim Hannify were the scorers. It was their only Leinster SFC title, and it came two years after a great victory over Galway on a scoreline of nine points to eight in the National League final. Longford also won the O'Byrne Cup in 1965, 2000 & 2020.

When Longford lost a replayed Leinster SFC semi-final in 1970 it was the county's fourth semi-final in six years and 8th time reaching the semi-final stage. After 1970, Longford reached the Leinster SFC semi-final twice, in 1988 and 2018 (losing to Dublin on both occasions).

Brendan Hackett managed the team between 1987 and 1990 in his first managerial role at inter-county level. Longford made the 1988 Leinster SFC semi-finals and also two quarter-finals of the National Football League.

Victories over Westmeath and Wicklow in 1988 left the county on the verge of a Leinster SFC final after 20 years. The team played well against Dublin and led by three points at half-time. Team manager and sports psychologist Hackett cited what happened next as an example of lack of self-belief in extremis: Dublin drew level with twenty minutes remaining and won by 18 points.

Since first defeating Meath in the 1928 Leinster Championship, Longford has a decent record against that opponent in that competition and had a surprise victory in 1982. Longford forced Offaly to a replay in 1984, but the promise of the under-21 teams that reached successive Leinster finals in 1981 and 1982 failed to materialise. In 2002, the county's minor team won the Leinster Minor Football Championship, the following year the county vocational schools team won the All-Ireland Vocational Schools Championship at A and B level, the only county to do so.

Eamonn Coleman was manager of Longford in 1996 & 1997. He was replaced by Michael McCormack in 1997.

2001 saw Longford surrender the O'Byrne Cup in the opening round. The league saw Longford win four from the first five games, but defeats to Monaghan and Kildare in the final round meant there was no promotion. The championship began with victory over Louth in Navan to set up an SFC quarter-final against Dublin. Longford ultimately won well in that game, at Croke Park. 2001 also saw the introduction of the back door, or qualifiers. Longford's first second chance outing was away to Wicklow, though Longford lost by a scoreline of 1-14 to 0-11.

Denis Connerton was appointed manager in 2001 and managed the team until 2004 when he was replaced by Luke Dempsey.

Glenn Ryan replaced Luke Dempsey as manager and managed the team from 2009. In Ryan's first year in charge Longford were knocked out in the first round of the Leinster Senior Football Championship by Wicklow. They then went into the Qualifiers where they beat Leitrim 0–13 to 0–10 before they ran Kerry close in Round 2 going down 1–12 to 0–11.

Ryan's second year in charge once again seen his side go out in the first round in Leinster losing out to Louth, they once again entered the Qualifiers, in round 1 they pulled off the shock of the championship when they beat Mayo 1–12 to 0–14, in Round 2 Down proved too good and ran out 1–14 to 1–10 winners.

2011 started out well for Ryan and Longford when they beat Roscommon by 2–11 to 1–08 to take the National League Div 4 title.

In 2012, Longford again had a good start to the year this time by winning the Div 3 National League title with a win over Wexford giving Ryan and Longford back-to-back titles.

In August 2013, Ryan vacated the Longford senior management role.

In 2010, 2011 and 2012, Damien Sheridan won the All-Ireland Kick Fada Championship.

In October 2013, Jack Sheedy was confirmed as the team's new manager. The footballers had mixed fortunes in 2014. The Leinster SFC campaign finally yielded a win over Offaly for new manager Jack Sheedy on a scoreline of 0-19 to 0-15, but a 1-13 to 1-15 defeat to Wexford followed in the quarter-final, in the sunshine of Pearse Park. The All-Ireland SFC qualifier draw paired Longford with Derry, a high-scoring game which Longford won by two points. However, in the next round, Tipperary inflicted a 17-point defeat on Longford to end the county's 2014 championship campaign.

Denis Connerton replaced Sheedy as manager in 2015; it was Connerton's second spell in charge having previously managed the team during the 2002 and 2004 seasons.

Former player Padraic Davis took over as manager in 2018. Davis was given a two-year extension in 2020 until the end of 2022. But he quit at the end of the 2021 season after losing to Meath by 22 points, referring to his family, his property market job and the difficulties of managing at that level.

Laois native Billy O'Loughlin was appointed Longford manager in November 2021. He resigned at the end of the 2022 season, citing work commitments. Paddy Christie won back-to-back O'Byrne Cup titles before stepping down as manager in 2024. Mayo's 2016 All-Ireland Under-21 Football Championship-winning manager Mike Solan replaced him, arriving from Sligo GAA club Tourlestrane.

== Panel ==
Team as per Longford vs Tipperary in the NFL, 4 February 2024.

No.	Player	Position	Club
1	Micheál Hughes	Goalkeeper	Killoe Young Emmets
2	Patrick Fox (c)	Right corner-back	Mullinalaghta
3	Oisín O'Toole	Full back	Dromard
4	Bryan Masterson	Left corner-Back	Abbeylara
5	Keelin McGann	Right half-back	Kenagh
6	Ryan Moffett	Centre back	Killoe Young Emmets
7	Michael Quinn^{RET}	Left half-back	Killoe Young Emmets
8	Darren Gallagher^{WD}	Midfield	St Mary's Granard
9	Daire Duggan	Midfield	Seán Connollys
10	Daniel Reynolds	Right half-forward	Seán Connollys
11	Dylan Farrell	Centre forward	St Brigid's Killashee
12	Joseph Hagan	Left half-forward	Dromard
13	Mark Hughes^{WD}	Right corner-forward	Killoe Young Emmets
14	Jayson Matthews	Full forward	Mullinalaghta
15	Cathal McCabe	Left corner-forward	Colmcille

No.	Player	Position	Club
16	Paddy Collum	Substitute	Fr Manning Gaels
17	Barry O'Farrell	Substitute	Carrickedmond
18	Bryn Peters	Substitute	Rathcline
19	Diarmuid Farrell	Substitute	Ardagh Moydow
20	Liam Hughes^{WD}	Substitute	Killoe Young Emmets
21	Jordan Shiels	Substitute	St Mary's Granard
22	Ruairí Harkin	Substitute	Colmcille
23	Daniel Mimnagh^{WD}	Substitute	Killoe Young Emmets
24	Mark Tully	Substitute	St Mary's Granard
25	Dessie Reynolds	Substitute	Seán Connollys
26	James Kiernan	Substitute	St Mary's Granard

^{INJ} Player has had an injury which has affected recent involvement with the county team.
^{RET} Player has since retired from the county team.
^{WD} Player has since withdrawn from the county team due to a non-injury issue.

== Management team ==
Ratified for a three-year term in August 2024

- Manager: Mike Solan

== Managerial history ==
Dates	Name	Origin
1937–19??	Tom Molloy	Galway
193?–1965	?	
1965–1970	Mick Higgins	Longford
1970–1973	Seán Murray	Longford
1973–1975	John Donlon	Longford
1975	Seán Donnelly	Slashers
1976–1978	Jackie Devine	Longford
1978–1979	Mickey Kelly	Longford
1979–1981	Jackie Devine (2) & Brendan Gilmore	Longford
1981–1987	John Murphy	Cork/Longford
1987–1990	Brendan Hackett	
1990–1992	Dessie Dolan	Westmeath
1992–1994	Mike Kenny	Longford
1994–1995	Tom Donoghue	Galway
August 1995–May 1997	Eamonn Coleman	
1997–2001	Michael McCormack	Longford/Monaghan
2001–2004	Denis Connerton	
2004–2008	Luke Dempsey	
2008–2013	Glenn Ryan	
2013–2015	Jack Sheedy	
2015–2018	Denis Connerton (2)	
2018–2021	Padraic Davis	
2021–2022	Billy O'Loughlin	
2022–2024	Paddy Christie	
2024–	Mike Solan	

== Players ==
=== Notable players ===
- Mickey Quinn, who made 139 appearances over 13 years

=== All Stars ===
Longford has no All Stars.

=== Team of the Millennium ===
Longford's Team of the Millennium was unique as it contained the only father and son combination in the country; Drumlish's Jim Hannify Snr and Jnr. The start of the new millennium also saw the selection of Longford's Team of the Millennium as follows:

Position	Player	Club
Goalkeeper	John Heneghan	Ballymahon
Right corner-back	Séamus Flynn	Clonguish
Full back	Larry Gillen	Ardagh St Patrick's
Left full-back	Billy Morgan	Killoe Young Emmets
Right half-back	Brendan Barden	Clonguish
Centre back	Mick Casey	Cashel
Left half-back	Eamonn Meagher	Drumlish Young Irelands (Éire Óg)
Midfield	Jim Hannify Snr	Drumlish/Drumlish Young Irelands
Midfield	Jimmy Flynn	Clonguish
Right half-forward	Jackie Devine	Mostrim
Centre forward	Vincent Tierney	St Mary's Granard
Left half-forward	Jimmy Hannify Jnr	Éire Óg/Fr Manning Gaels
Right full-forward	Dessie Barry	Longford Slashers
Full forward	Joe Regan	St Mary's Granard
Left full-forward	Seán Donnelly	Longford Slashers

== Competitive record ==
Longford's only National Football League title win is from 1965–66, with Mick Higgins as manager.

- 1 John Heneghan
- 2 Séamus Flynn
- 3 Larry Gillen
- 4 Brendan Gilmore
- 5 Brendan Barden (c)
- 6 John Donlon
- 7 Pat Barden
- 8 Jimmy Flynn
- 9 Mickey Burns
- 10 Jackie Devine
- 11 Mick Hopkins
- 12 Jimmy Hanniffy (Jnr or Snr?)
- 13 Seán Murray
- 14 R. Burns (Bobby Burns?)
- 15 Seán Donnelly

Sub used: Tom Mulvihill

== Honours ==
=== National ===
- National Football League
  - (gold) Winners (1): 1965–66
- National Football League Division 2
  - (gold) Winners (2): 1937, 1972
- National Football League Division 3
  - (gold) Winners (1): 2012
- National Football League Division 4
  - (gold) Winners (1): 2011
- All-Ireland Junior Football Championship
  - (gold) Winners (1): 1937
- All-Ireland Vocational Schools Championship
  - (gold) Winners (2): 2003, 2013

=== Provincial ===
- Leinster Senior Football Championship
  - (gold) Winners (1): 1968
  - (silver) Runners-up (1): 1965
- O'Byrne Cup
  - (gold) Winners (4): 1965, 2000, 2020, 2023
- Leinster Junior Football Championship
  - (gold) Winners (3): 1924 (awarded), 1937, 1953
- Leinster Under-21 Football Championship
  - (silver) Runners-up (7): 1966, 1981, 1982, 2003, 2006, 2011, 2013
- Leinster Minor Football Championship
  - (gold) Winners (5): 1929, 1938, 2002, 2010, 2024
  - (silver) Runners-up (3): 1930, 1974, 2015
