= 1965–66 National Football League (Ireland) =

Gaelic football competition

1964–65 National Football League
League details
- Dates: October 1965 – 16 October 1966

League champions
- Winners: Longford (1st win)
- Captain: Brendan Barden
- Manager: Mick Higgins

League runners-up
- Runners-up: New York
- Captain: Paddy Cummins

The 1965–66 National Football League was the 35th staging of the National Football League (NFL), an annual Gaelic football tournament for the Gaelic Athletic Association county teams of Ireland.

Longford won their first and (so far) only NFL title with wins over Galway in the "home" final and New York in the two-legged "World Championship." Longford had the first leg at Pearse Park and won easily. After the second leg, an angry crowd chased the New York team off the field due to their (perceived) rough play.

== Format ==
=== Divisions ===
- Division I: 8 team. Split into two groups of four
- Division II: 8 teams. Split into two groups of four
- Division III: 8 teams. Split into two groups of four
- Division IV: 8 teams. Split into two groups of four

== Group stages ==
=== Division I (Dr Lagan Cup) ===
==== Group B play-off ====
28 November 1965 For 1st Place	Donegal	2-9 — 1-8	Fermanagh	Ballybofey
				Referee: D Donnelly (Tyrone)

==== Inter-group play-offs ====
20 February 1966 Semi-final	Donegal	4-11 — 0-10	Antrim	Ballybay
				Referee: J Martin (Tyrone)

6 March 1966 Semi-final	Down	2-17 — 1-7	Fermanagh	Ballybay
				Referee: F Tierney (Cavan)

13 March 1966 Final	Donegal	1-10 — 1-3	Down	Dungannon

==== Group A ====
Team	Pld	W	D	L	Pts	Status
Down	3	3	0	0	6
Antrim	3	2	0	1	4
Armagh	3	1	0	2	2
Monaghan	3	0	0	3	0

==== Group B ====
Team	Pld	W	D	L	Pts	Status
Donegal	3	2	0	1	4	Win Dr Lagan Cup; advance to Knockout Stage
Fermanagh	3	2	0	1	4
Tyrone	3	1	1	1	3
Derry	3	0	1	2	1

=== Division II ===
==== Inter-group play-offs ====
13 February 1966 Semi-final	Cavan	1-11 — 1-6	Kerry	Croke Park
				Referee: P Kelly (Dublin)

13 February 1966 Semi-final	Longford	1-7 — 0-8	Meath	Croke Park
				Referee: J Martin (Tyrone)

6 March 1966 Final	Longford	0-11 — 0-7	Cavan	Carrick-on-Shannon
				Referee: M Loftus (Mayo)

==== Group A ====
Team	Pld	W	D	L	Pts	Status
Longford	3	3	0	0	6	Advance to Knockout stage
Cavan	3	2	0	1	4
Sligo	3	1	0	2	2
Leitrim	3	0	0	3	0

==== Group B ====
Team	Pld	W	D	L	Pts	Status
Kerry	3	3	0	0	6
Meath	3	2	0	1	4
Louth	3	1	0	2	2
Wicklow	3	0	0	3	0

=== Division III ===
==== Inter-group play-offs ====
6 March 1966 Semi-final	Dublin	1-16 — 1-2	Waterford	Croke Park
				Referee: J Hatton (Wicklow)

6 March 1966 Semi-final	Kildare	3-12 — 2-5	Carlow	Croke Park
				Referee: J Shannon (Dublin)

13 March 1966 Final	Kildare	0-10 — 0-7	Dublin	Croke Park
				Referee: E Moules (Wicklow)

==== Tables ====
===== Group A =====
Team	Pld	W	D	L	Pts	Status
Dublin	3	2	0	1	4
Kildare	3	2	0	1	4	Advance to Knockout stage
Laois	3	1	0	2	2
Cork	3	1	0	2	2

===== Group B =====
Team	Pld	W	D	L	Pts	Status
Carlow	3	2	0	1	4
Waterford	3	2	0	1	4
Kilkenny	3	1	0	2	2
Wexford	3	1	0	2	2

=== Division IV ===
==== Group B play-off ====
23 January 1966 For 2nd Place	Offaly	3-3 — 0-6	Tipperary	Templemore
				Referee: Seamus Garvey (Kerry)

6 February 1966 For 1st Place	Roscommon	1-9 — 1-7	Offaly	Ballinasloe
				Referee: J Martin (Tyrone)

==== Inter-group play-offs ====
20 February 1966 Semi-final	Mayo	3-11 — 2-10	Roscommon	Tuam
				Referee: M Mahon (Fermanagh)

20 February 1966 Semi-final	Galway	0-11 — 0-7	Offaly	Tuam
				Referee: E Moules (Wicklow)

6 March 1966 Final	Galway	2-6 — 0-7	Mayo	Tuam
				Referee: J Martin (Tyrone)

==== Group A ====
Team	Pld	W	D	L	Pts	Status
Galway	3	3	0	0	6	Advance to Knockout stage
Mayo	3	2	0	1	4
Limerick	3	1	0	2	2
Clare	3	0	0	3	0

==== Group B ====
Team	Pld	W	D	L	Pts	Status
Roscommon	3	2	0	1	4
Offaly	3	2	0	1	4
Tipperary	3	2	0	1	4
Westmeath	3	0	0	2	0

== Knockout stages ==
=== Semi-finals ===
27 March 1966

Galway	2-12 – 0-6	Kildare

Croke Park, Dublin
Attendance: 14,350
Referee: Jimmy Martin (Tyrone)

3 April 1966

Longford	0-13 – 0-11	Donegal
Bobby Burns 0-6; Jackie Devine 0-3; Mick Hopkins, Jimmy Hanniffy, Mick Burns, Seán Murray 0-1 each		Mickey McLoone 0-8; P McShea 0-2; J Hannigan 0-1

Croke Park, Dublin
Attendance: 22,845
Referee: M Loftus (Mayo)

=== Home Final ===
24 April 1966

Galway	0-8 – 0-9	Longford
		Bobby Burns 0-8; Seán Murray 0-1

Croke Park, Dublin
Attendance: 45,317
Referee: Jimmy Martin (Tyrone)

=== Final ===
2 October 1966
First leg

Longford	1-9 – 0-7	New York

Pearse Park, Longford
Attendance: 8,000
Referee: J Nolan (New York and Offaly)

9 October 1966
Second leg

New York	0-10 – 0-9	Longford

Croke Park, Dublin
Referee: J Nolan (New York and Offaly)

Longford win 21–17 on aggregate.
