= Longford Senior Hurling Championship =

Annual hurling competition

- Current season or competition: 2026 Longford Senior Hurling Championship
- Irish: Craobh Sinsear Iomána an Longfoirt
- Code: Hurling
- Founded: 1904
- Region: Longford (GAA)
- Trophy: JJ Duignan Cup
- No. of teams: 3
- Title holders: Longford Slashers (14th title)
- Most titles: Wolfe Tones (21 titles)
- Official website: https://longfordgaa.ie

The Longford Club Hurling Championship is an annual Gaelic Athletic Association competition organised by Longford GAA among hurling clubs in County Longford, Ireland. The winner qualifies to represent the county in the Leinster Junior Club Hurling Championship, the winner of which progresses to the All-Ireland Junior Club Hurling Championship.

The winning club receives the JJ Duignan Cup, named for the proprietor of the Tally-Ho pub in Longford town; it is also called the Tally-Ho Cup for this reason.

Currently three clubs compete in the County Championship: Wolfe Tones, Longford Slashers and Clonguish Gaels.

== Format ==
=== Group stage ===
The 3 clubs start in a groups stage. Each team plays once against the others in the group - home and away - guaranteed two group games. Two points are awarded for a win. The top two teams qualify for the final.

=== Final ===
The group stage winner and runners-up contest the final. The winning team are declared champions.

== Qualification for subsequent competition ==
At the end of the championship, the winning team qualifies for the Leinster Special Club Junior Hurling Championship.

== Teams ==
=== 2026 Teams ===
The 3 teams competing in the 2026 championship were:

Club	Location	Position in 2026	Championship titles	Last championship title
Clonguish Gaels	Newtownforbes	Group stage	7	2023
Longford Slashers	Longford	Champions	14	2026
Wolfe Tones	Edgeworthstown	Runners-Up	21	2024

== Roll of honour ==
=== By club ===
#	Club	Titles	Runners-up	Championship Wins	Championship Runner-Ups
1	Wolfe Tones	21	10	1992, 1993, 1994, 1995, 1996, 1998, 1999, 2002, 2004, 2007, 2008, 2009, 2010, 2013, 2014, 2015, 2016, 2017, 2018, 2020, 2024	1987, 1990, 1991, 1997, 2003, 2005, 2012, 2021, 2025, 2026
2	Longford Slashers	14	19	1982, 1983, 1984, 1986, 1987, 1989, 1990, 1991, 1997, 2000, 2001, 2021, 2025, 2026	1985, 1988, 1992, 1993, 1994 1995, 1996, 1998, 1999, 2002, 2006, 2007, 2015, 2017, 2019, 2020, 2022, 2023, 2024
3	Clonguish Gaels	7	8	2003, 2005, 2006, 2012, 2019, 2022, 2023	2004, 2008, 2009, 2010, 2013, 2014, 2016, 2018
4	Granard	3	0	1932, 1933, 1934	—
5	Naomh Ciarán (Rathcline)	2	4	1985, 1988	1982, 1983, 1984, 1989
6	Longford Leo Caseys	1	1	1904	1907
6	Killoe Young Emmets	1	1	1907	1904
8	Ballymahon Gaels	0	2	—	2000, 2001
8	Longford	0	1	—	1934
8	Bunlahy	0	1	—	1986

== List of finals ==
Year	Winners		Runners-up	
Year	Club	Score	Club	Score
2026	Longford Slashers	1-22	Wolfe Tones	1-12
2025	Longford Slashers	2-13, 1-16 (R)	Wolfe Tones	0-19, 0-15 (R)
2024	Wolfe Tones	2-15	Longford Slashers	3-10
2023	Clonguish Gaels	2-14	Longford Slashers	1-14
2022	Clonguish Gaels	1-15	Longford Slashers	1-13
2021	Longford Slashers	4-11	Wolfe Tones	1-14
2020	Wolfe Tones	3-10	Longford Slashers	1-06
2019	Clonguish Gaels	1-19	Longford Slashers	0-10
2018	Wolfe Tones	1-11	Clonguish Gaels	0-10
2017	Wolfe Tones	2-11	Longford Slashers	2-10
2016	Wolfe Tones	2-15	Clonguish Gaels	1-05
2015	Wolfe Tones	4-11	Longford Slashers	0-10
2014	Wolfe Tones	2-10	Clonguish Gaels	1-10
2013	Wolfe Tones	3-12	Clonguish Gaels	2-14
2012	Clonguish Gaels	1-10	Wolfe Tones	1-08
2011	Final Declared Null & Void			
2010	Wolfe Tones	2-10	Clonguish Gaels	1-10
2009	Wolfe Tones	1-16	Clonguish Gaels	1-06
2008	Wolfe Tones	2-08	Clonguish Gaels	1-10
2007	Wolfe Tones	2-17	Longford Slashers	1-17
2006	Clonguish Gaels	3-15	Longford Slashers	4-06
2005	Clonguish Gaels	3-11	Wolfe Tones	3-05
2004	Wolfe Tones	1-11	Clonguish Gaels	0-05
2003	Clonguish Gaels	3-09	Wolfe Tones	1-05
2002	Wolfe Tones	0-16	Slashers Gaels	0-14
2001	Slashers Gaels	6-11	Ballymahon Gaels	1-04
2000	Slashers Gaels	3-13	Ballymahon Gaels	1-09
1999	Wolfe Tones	3-06	Slashers Gaels	0-07
1998	Wolfe Tones	4-09	Slashers Gaels	0-04
1997	Slashers Gaels	1-08	Wolfe Tones	0-08
1996	Wolfe Tones	2-09	Slashers Gaels	2-06
1995	Wolfe Tones	2-10	Slashers Gaels	0-10
1994	Wolfe Tones	2-08	Slashers Gaels	0-01
1993	Wolfe Tones	0-13	Slashers Gaels	0-05
1992	Wolfe Tones	2-06	Slashers Gaels	1-07
1991	Slashers Gaels	3-08	Wolfe Tones	0-02
1990	Slashers Gaels	3-08	Wolfe Tones	0-05
1989	Slashers Gaels	1-10	Naomh Ciarán (Rathcline)	0-04
1988	Naomh Ciarán (Rathcline)	1-14	Slashers Gaels	2-10
1987	Slashers Gaels	3-10	Wolfe Tones	0-06
1986	Slashers Gaels	6-11	Bunlahy	0-06
1985	Naomh Ciarán (Rathcline)	2-18	Slashers Gaels	0-03
1984	Slashers Gaels	5-09	Naomh Ciarán (Rathcline)	0-05
1983	Slashers Gaels	4-12	Naomh Ciarán (Rathcline)	4-08
1982	Slashers Gaels	2-10	Naomh Ciarán (Rathcline)	1-06
1935-81	No Competition			
1934	Granard	3-02	Longford	1-03
1933	Granard won by topping the table			
1932	Granard won by topping the table			
1908-31	No Competition			
1907	Killoe Young Emmets	3-03	Longford Leo Caseys	0-00
1906	No Competition			
1905	No Competition			
1904	Longford Leo Caseys	2-03 (2-4)	Killoe Young Emmets	1-02 (0-1)

=== Notes ===
- 1904 Hurling Championship was organised alongside the 1904 Football Championship in late 1904, and both competitions ended up being completed in 1905. The hurling final was played on 19th February 1905 and was replayed on 7th May 1905 following an objection.

- 1907, 2012 & 2013 SHC's consisted of just two teams, hence SHC Competition was limited to one game (final).

- No losing finalist for 1932 or 1933 as the winner topped the table (i.e. No final - League format).

- Granard hurling club won the Cavan Senior Hurling Championship in 1950, beating Ballyhaise by 5-3 to 1-1 in the final.

- 2011 final was declared null and void by CCCC after a dispute arose over the scheduling of dates for the decider.

- Longford Slashers played hurling as Slashers Gaels until the 2000s.

== See also ==
- Longford Senior Football Championship
- Leinster Junior Club Hurling Championship
