= Edgeworthstown =

Town in County Longford, Ireland

Edgeworthstown Meathas Troim Mostrim
- Town
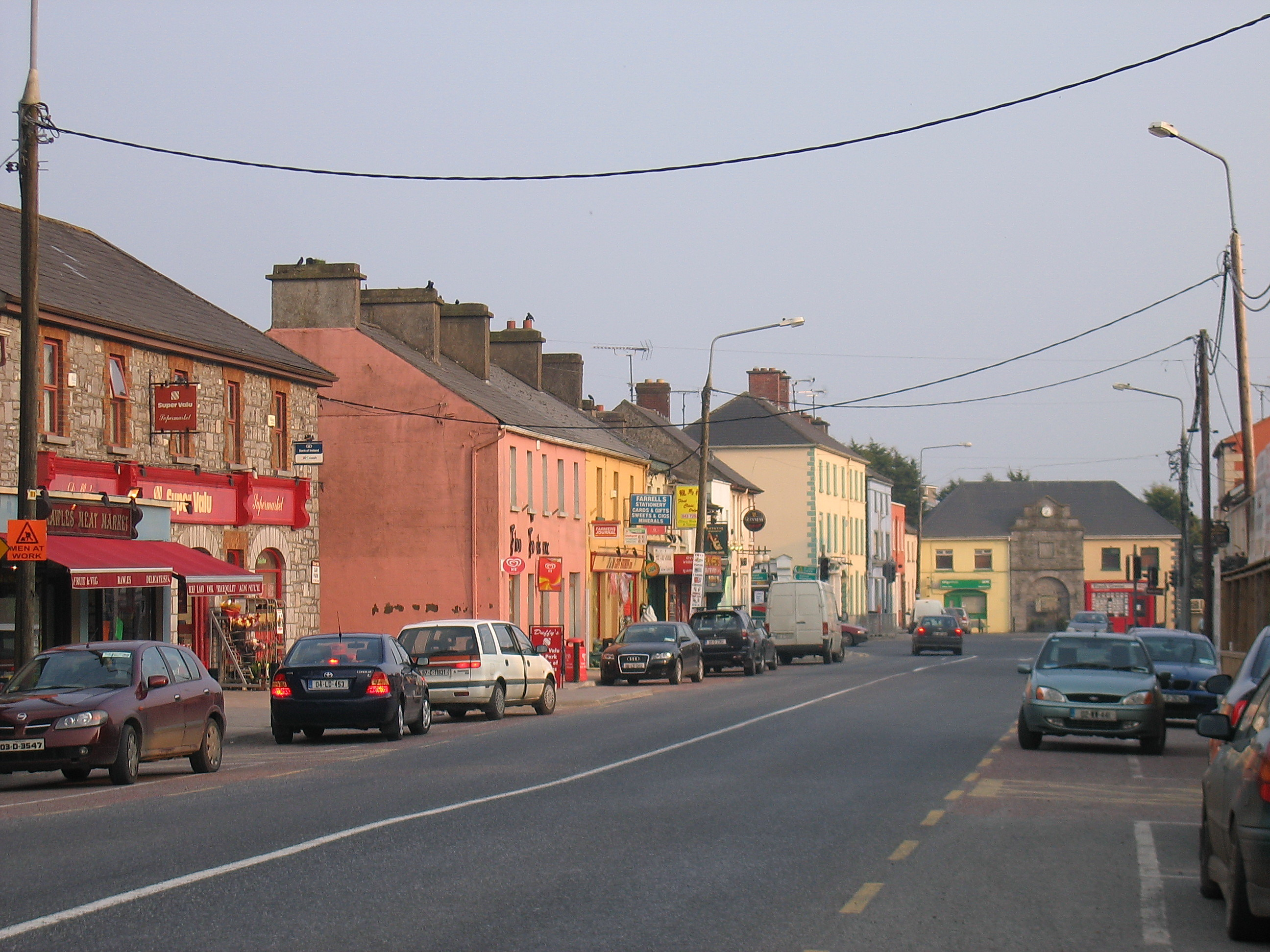
- Edgeworthstown's main street

- Location in Ireland
- Coordinates: 53°41′48″N 7°36′35″W
- Country: Ireland
- Province: Leinster
- County: County Longford
- Elevation: 82 m (269 ft)

Population (2022)
  - Total: 2,199
- Time zone: UTC±0 (WET)
  - Summer (DST): UTC+1 (IST)
- Eircode routing key: N39
- Telephone area code: +353(0)43
- Irish Grid Reference: N256719

Edgeworthstown or Mostrim (Irish: Meathas Troim, meaning 'frontier of the elder tree') is a small town in County Longford, Ireland. The town is in the east of the county, near the border with County Westmeath. Nearby towns are Longford 12 km to the west, Mullingar 26 km to the east, Athlone 40 km to the south and Cavan 42 km to the north. The N4 and N55 roads meet in the town. The town is in the townland of Edgeworthstown and in the civil parish of Mostrim.

== Name ==
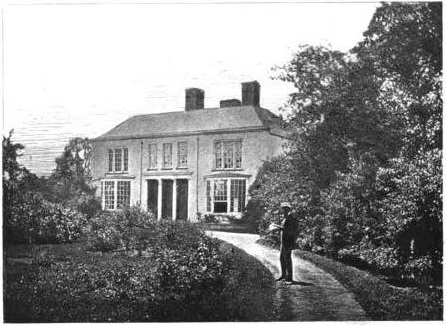
Edgeworthstown House, home of the Edgeworth family

The area was named Edgeworthstown in the 19th century after the Anglo-Irish Edgeworth family. An estate was built there by Richard Lovell Edgeworth. His family—which includes Honora Sneyd (his second wife), writer and intellectual Maria Edgeworth, botanist Michael Pakenham Edgeworth, economist Francis Ysidro Edgeworth, and priest Henry Essex Edgeworth—lived at the estate.

The area's original name was the Irish Meathas Troim or Meathas Truim. This was anglicized as Mastrim or Mostrim and variants. These names continued to be used by the locals. In 1935, at the behest of the local Town Tenants' Association, Longford County Council officially changed the town's name to Mostrim. However, in 1974, a local government order reverted the name to Edgeworthstown. Today, both names are in use.

== Infrastructure ==
The town is located where the N4 Dublin-Sligo/ N5 Dublin-Castlebar road crosses the N55 Cavan-Athlone road. The town also has a railway station on the Dublin–Sligo railway line. Edgeworthstown railway station opened on 8 November 1855. Edgeworthstown expanded significantly during the first decade of the 21st century with many new housing developments and updated transport infrastructure including a bypass. The N4 National primary route formerly ran along the Main Street until the town centre was bypassed in mid-2006. The N55 route from Athlone to Cavan still passes through the town centre.

== Industry ==
Industries include animal feed processing and pet food manufacturing, with Paul & Vincent Limited and C & D Foods Limited employing several hundred people in the area. The latter, C & D Foods Limited, reopened a pet food plant in 2014 following an earlier fire.

== Sport ==
The local Gaelic Athletic Association club is named Mostrim, while the minor section of the club is called Wolfe Tones GAA. The club has won three Longford Senior Football Championships, in 1974, 1985 and 1992. In Gaelic football, Mostrim won an u-21 championship 2002 and the Wolfe Tones minor team won Minor A Championships in 2002 and in 2006. In hurling, Wolfe Tones has won a record 19 Longford Senior Hurling Championship titles. Hugh Devine Park is the home pitch for both Mostrim and Wolfe Tones.

A local soccer club, Mostrim United, has played in the Longford & District Schoolboy/girl League.

== People ==
- James Byrnes (1806–1886), member of the New South Wales Legislative Council New South Wales Legislative Assembly
- Henry Essex Edgeworth (1745–1807), the confessor of Louis XVI
- Maria Edgeworth (1768–1849), writer, lived at Edgeworthstown House
- Francis Ysidro Edgeworth (1845–1926), Anglo-Irish philosopher
- Bernard A. Maguire (1818–1886), Jesuit who became the president of Georgetown University
- John Phillips (c.1840–1917), Nationalist Party MP for South Longford

== See also ==
- List of towns and villages in Ireland
- Market Houses in Ireland
- Granard
