= Brendan Barden =

Irish Gaelic footballer

Personal information
- Born: County Longford, Ireland
- Height: 6 ft 1 in (185 cm)

Sport
- Sport: Gaelic football
- Position: Half back
Club
- Years: Club
- Clonguish
Club titles
- Longford titles: 8
Inter-county
- Years: County
- 1960s-1970s: Longford
Inter-county titles
- Leinster titles: 1
- NFL: 1

Brendan Barden was a Gaelic footballer from County Longford, Ireland. He was part of the Longford team that won a National Football League title in 1966 as captain, an O'Byrne Cup in 1965 and a Leinster Senior Football title in 1968. In 1962 he played on the winning Leinster Railway Cup team. In 1966 he was a Leinster All-Star footballer and won a Cú Chulainn Award.

He won 8 Longford Senior Football Championship titles with his club Clonguish during the 1960s and 1970s.
