= Wolfe Tones GAA (Longford) =

Longford-based Gaelic games club

Wolfe Tones
- Bhulf Tón
- Founded: 1982
- County: Longford
- Nickname: Wolfe Tones Mostrim, Wolfe Tones Edgeworthstown
- Colours: Green and red
- Grounds: Hugh Divine Park
- Coordinates: 53°41′34″N 7°36′57″W

Playing kits
Standard colours

Senior Club Championships
	All Ireland	Leinster champions	Longford champions
Hurling:	0	0	21

Wolfe Tones Hurling Club is a Gaelic games club located in Edgeworthstown (Mostrim), County Longford, Ireland. The club is solely concerned with the game of hurling, and is named for the Irish patriot Wolfe Tone (1763–1798).

Founded in 1982, they play at Hugh Divine Park in the Tinnynarr townland, south of the town. The club motto is Spórt don Saol (Irish: 'Sport for Life').

== Honours ==
- Longford Senior Hurling Championship (20): 1992, 1993, 1994, 1995, 1996, 1998, 1999, 2002, 2004, 2007, 2008, 2009, 2010, 2013, 2014, 2015, 2016, 2017, 2018, 2020, 2024
