= Longford Slashers =

Longford-based Gaelic games club

- Flipeadóirí Longfoirt
- Founded: 1954
- County: Longford
- Nickname: The Townies
- Colours: Sky Blue, Navy and White
- Grounds: Michael Fay Park
- Coordinates: 53°42′53.39″N 7°47′58.83″W

Playing kits
Standard colours

Senior Club Championships
	All Ireland	Leinster champions	Longford champions
Football:	-	-	16
Hurling:	-	-	14
Ladies' football:	1	1	8

Longford Slashers is a Gaelic Athletic Association club located in Longford, County Longford, Ireland. The club is based out of Michael Fay Park in Longford Town.

The Ladies club won 9 county titles in a row from Junior to Senior (2017–2025), and Leinster and All-Ireland titles in 2022. They are the only club in any code in Longford history to achieve All-Ireland success and the only club in Longford history to win 7 championship titles in a row.

Longford Senior Football Championship 16 times, and during the 2010s was the only club in the county to field teams at football, hurling, ladies football and Camogie.

== History ==
The Longford Slashers club was formed in 1954 when Longford Wanderers and Whiterock Slashers clubs merged to form a new club.They decided to take Longford from Wanderers and Slashers from Whiterock hence Longford Slashers came into existence.

The Ladies club has won the Longford LGFA Senior Football Championship 8 times, with victories in 1983, 2019, 2020, 2021, 2022, 2023, 2024 and 2025.

They also won the Leinster and All-Ireland Intermediate titles in 2022.

The club has won the Longford Senior Football Championship 16 times, with victories in 1954, 1956, 1957, 1959, 1961, 1971, 1975, 1979, 1980, 1989, 1990, 1991, 1994, 2010, 2011, and 2013.

The club has won the Longford Senior Hurling Championship 14 times, with victories in 1982, 1983, 1984, 1986, 1987, 1989, 1990, 1991, 1997, 2000, 2001,2021, 2025 and 2026. The hurling club was called the Slashers Gaels until the mid-2000s, when it was changed to the Longford Slashers.

At the formation of the club in 1954, Longford Slashers depended on Longford County Board to play many of their games in Pearse Park. While the club also rented some fields locally over the years.

The Club grounds, Clubhouse, and other facilities were officially opened by the then President of Cumann Luthchleas Gael, Padraic McFlynn, on 12 October 1980.

In 1978, the club purchased an initial 12 acres (4.9 ha) at Farneyhoogan on the outskirts of Longford town. Following extensive development work, the first two pitches were opened on 8 June 1980. The first competitive game was a Leader Cup match against Ardagh.

On 25 April 2005, a new floodlit all-weather playing pitch was opened on an additional 6 acres (2.4 ha) of land that the club had purchased.

On 6 October 2013, Slashers won their 16th county Senior Football Championship title, defeating Dromard by a score of 1–11 to 1–9.

== Notable players ==
- Gareth Ghee

== Achievements ==
- Longford Senior Football Championship: 16
  - 1954, 1956, 1957, 1959, 1961, 1971, 1975, 1979, 1980, 1989, 1990, 1991, 1994, 2010, 2011, 2013
  - (Runner-up in 1960, 1963, 1964, 1968, 1977, 1978, 1981, 1997, 2006, 2008, 2012, 2019, 2020)
- Longford Senior Hurling Championship: 14
  - 1982, 1983, 1984, 1986, 1987, 1989, 1990, 1991, 1997, 2000, 2001, 2021, 2025, 2026
- All-Ireland LGFA Intermediate Football Championship: 1
  - 2022
- Leinster LGFA Intermediate Football Championship: 1
  - 2022 (Runner-up in 2021)
- Longford LGFA Senior Football Championship: 8
  - 1983, 2019, 2020, 2021, 2022, 2023, 2024, 2025
- Longford LGFA Intermediate Football Championship: 1
  - 2018
- Longford LGFA Junior Football Championship: 1
  - 2017 (Runner-up in 2013, 2014, 2015)

== Under-age ==
Their club has underage football teams at U-8s, U-10s, U-12s, two U-14s, two U16s & Minor grades. Longford Slashers have had success at the U-21 level in the county, including in 2004. In hurling, the club fields under-age teams from U-8 through to Minor level and has won titles at every grade, including National John West Féile na nGael cup champions in 2018 and 2019.
