= Clonguish GAA =

Longford-based Gaelic games club

Clonguish
- Cluain Geis
- Founded: 1889
- County: Longford
- Nickname: The Greens
- Colours: Green and White
- Grounds: Bertie Allen Park
- Coordinates: 53°45′42″N 7°49′57″W

Playing kits
Standard colours

Senior Club Championships
	All Ireland	Leinster champions	Longford champions
Football:	-	-	13
Hurling:	-	-	7
Ladies' football:	–	–	7

Clonguish GAA is a Gaelic football and hurling club in Newtownforbes, County Longford, Ireland. The club was formed on 20 October 1889 and was originally called Clonguish Gallowglasses. Situated in the west of County Longford, it is bordered by four parishes in County Longford, Drumlish, Killoe, Killashee and Templemichael (Longford) – the parish also shares a common boundary with the Province of Connacht in that it adjoins the parishes of Bornacoola and Gortletteragh in County Leitrim and Tarmonbarry in County Roscommon. The Irish for Clonguish is Cluain Geis which means 'The Meadow of the Swans', hence the swan on their club crest. Their motto is Bua agus Beannacht, 'Victory and blessing,' an old Irish well-wishing.

Clonguish played their games at Curry Field in the Castleforbes Estate before moving to their new ground Centenary Park in 1984, in the Lamagh townland southeast of the town. Centenary Park is now called Bertie Allen Park after one of Clonguish's and Longford's most famous GAA men. Bertie Allen Park has two full-size pitches with state of the art floodlights on the main pitch and training lights on the bottom pitch. Work has been carried out on a third pitch beside the training pitch. The facilities include dressing rooms, weights room, two meeting rooms, an indoor soccer, basketball court and handball area.

== Notable players ==
- Brendan Barden
- Paul Barden
- David Barden
- Séamus Flynn
- Enda Williams

== Honours ==
Competitions	Wins	Years won
Longford Senior Football Championship	13	1962, 1963, 1964, 1965, 1968, 1969, 1972, 1973, 1981, 2003, 2004, 2009, 2026
Longford Intermediate Football Championship	1	1997
Longford Junior Football Championship	7	1928, 1941, 1947, 1959, 1992, 2003, 2026
Longford Senior B Football Championship	1	2011
Leader Cup (S.F.L.)	13	1952, 1965, 1968, 1973, 1979, 2002, 2003, 2007, 2008, 2011, 2024, 2025, 2026
Longford Senior Football League	2	1911, 1919
Longford Intermediate Football League	1	1975
Longford Junior Football League	9	1918, 1940, 1941, 1947, 1955, 1959, 1969, 1971, 1972
All County Football League Division 1	4	2003, 2008, 2011, 2025
All County Football League Division 2	3	1984, 1995, 2006
All County Football League Division 3	1	2026
All County Football League Division 4	1	1992
All County Football League Division 2A	2	1985, 1996
All County Football League Division 3A	1	1991
Under 21 Football Championship	10	1964, 1965, 1971, 1972, 2000, 2017, 2022, 2023, 2024, 2025
Under 21 Football Championship 13-a-side	1	1994
Minor Football Championship ^{(1)}	11	1950, 1961, 1969, 1998, 2003, 2021, 2022, 2023, 2024, 2025, 2026
Juvenile Football Championship ^{(3)}	10	1959, 1965, 1967, 2001, 2014, 2020, 2021, 2022, 2023, 2025
Under 14 Football Championship ^{(4)}	7	1980, 1984, 1999, 2019, 2020, 2022, 2023
Football Feile na nGael	6	1999, 2019, 2021, 2022, 2023, 2024
Longford Senior Hurling Championship	7	2003, 2005, 2006, 2012, 2019, 2022, 2023
Under 21 Hurling Championship	5	1998, 1999, 2000, 2002, 2003
Minor Hurling Championship	6	1996, 1997, 1998, 2003, 2005, 2010
Juvenile Hurling Championship	11	1969, 1984, 1994, 1996, 2001, 2002, 2003, 2009, 2010, 2011, 2023
Under 14 Hurling Championship	8	1970, 1982, 1984, 1994, 1999, 2006, 2008, 2009
Hurling Feile na nGael	6	1993, 1994, 1999, 2007, 2008, 2009
Táin Hurling League Division 5	1	2012

Notes

1: Clonguish won the Minor Championship in 1959 and Minor League in 1949 & 1951. No Minor Championship was played in 1949. Minor Championship of 1951 was not finished and it was decided at a County Board meeting in Feb 1952 to drop the incomplete 1951 Minor Championship as reported in the Longford Leader on 8 March 1952 in an article titled 'With the Minors'.

2: 1972 Minor Football Championship was won as an amalgamation of Lough Forbes Gaels & St. Vincents.

3: Juvenile Championship changed from U-16 to U-15 in 2021 & 2022, hence 2021 & 2022 title were U-15 while all others were U-16.

4: U-14 Championship was played as Urban and Rural from 1976 to 1988. Titles in 1980 & 1980 were U-14 Rural Championship.
