= 2026 Fermanagh Senior Football Championship =

Gaelic football competition in Fermanagh, Northern Ireland for the 2026 season

2026 Mannok Fermanagh Senior Football Championship
Tournament details
- County: Fermanagh
- Province: Ulster
- Level: Senior
- Year: 2026
- Trophy: New York Cup
- Sponsor: Mannok
- Date: 4 September – 25 October 2026
- Teams: 8
- Defending champions: Erne Gaels Belleek

Winners
- Champions: Erne Gaels (5th win)
- Manager: Barry O'Hagan
- Captain: Ryan Lyons
- Qualify for: Ulster Club SFC

Runners-up
- Runners-up: Derrygonnelly Harps
- Manager: Seán Flanagan
- Captain: Gary McKenna

Promotion/Relegation
- Relegated team(s): Lisnaskea Emmetts

Other
- Matches played: 19

The 2026 Fermanagh Senior Football Championship is the 120th edition of Fermanagh GAA's premier club Gaelic football tournament for senior clubs in County Fermanagh, Northern Ireland. The championship consists of eight teams, with the winner going on to represent Fermanagh in the Ulster Senior Club Football Championship. The championship began on 4 September 2026.

Erne Gaels Belleek are the defending champions after defeating Derrygonnelly Harps in the 2025 final.

== Team changes ==
The following teams have changed division since the 2025 championship season.

=== To Championship ===
Promoted from 2025 Intermediate Championship

- Irvinestown St Molaise (Intermediate Champions)

=== From Championship ===
Relegated to 2026 Intermediate Championship

- Kinawley Brian Borus (Relegation play-off losers)

== Participating Teams ==
The clubs participating in the 2026 Fermangh S.F.C. are:

Team	Location	Championship Position in 2025	Championship Position in 2026	Championship titles (Pre 2026)	Last championship title (Pre 2026)
Belnaleck Art McMurroughs	Bellanaleck	Quarter-Finalist	Semi-Finalist	1	1933
Derrygonnelly Harps	Derrygonnelly	Runners-up	Runners-up	10	2023
Ederney St Joseph's	Ederney	Semi-Finalist	Semi-Finalist	2	2020
Enniskillen Gaels	Enniskillen	Relegation Finalist	Quarter-Finalist	13	2022
Erne Gaels	Belleek	Champions	Champions	4	2025
Irvinestown St Molaise	Irvinestown	Intermediate Champions	Quarter-Finalist	2	1952
Lisnaskea Emmetts	Lisnaskea	Quarter-Finalist	Relegated to Intermediate	20	1994
Teemore Shamrocks	Teemore	Semi-Finalist	Relegation Finalist	21	2005

== Group Stage ==
The teams in each group were confirmed on the 16 August 2026.

=== Group A ===
Advance to semi-final Advance to quarter-final Advance to relegation playoff

Team	Pld	W	D	L	F	A	Diff	Pts
Erne Gaels	3	3	0	0	56	30	+26	6
Derrygonnelly Harps	3	2	0	1	45	49	-4	4
Irvinestown St Molaise	3	1	0	2	39	52	-13	2
Lisnaskea Emmetts	3	0	0	3	45	54	-9	0

==== Round 1 ====
6 September 2026 Round 1	Derrygonnelly Harps	0-17 (17) – (14) 1-11	Lisnaskea Emmetts	Derrygonnelly
13:30 IST (UTC+1)				Venue: Canon Maguire Park
		Report

6 September 2026 Round 1	Erne Gaels	0-17 (17) – (6) 0-06	Irvinestown St Molaise	Belleek
16:30 IST (UTC+1)				Venue: Páirc na hEirne
		Report

==== Round 2 ====
12 September 2026 Round 2	Irvinestown St Molaise	1-14 (17) – (20) 1-17	Derrygonnelly Harps	Irvinestown
19:00 IST (UTC+1)				Venue: St Molaise Park
		Report

13 September 2026 Round 2	Lisnaskea Emmetts	0-16 (16) – (21) 1-18	Erne Gaels	Lisnaskea
16:30 IST (UTC+1)				Venue: Emmett Park
		Report

==== Round 3 ====
27 September 2026 Round 3	Irvinestown St Molaise	0-16 (16) – (15) 1-12	Lisnaskea Emmetts	Roslea
15:00 IST (UTC+1)				Venue: Shamrock Park
		Report

27 September 2026 Round 3	Derrygonnelly Harps	0-08 (8) – (18) 1-15	Erne Gaels	Kinawley
15:00 IST (UTC+1)				Venue: Patrick McManus Park
		Report

=== Group B ===
Advance to semi-final Advance to quarter-final Advance to relegation playoff

Team	Pld	W	D	L	F	A	Diff	Pts
Belnaleck Art McMurroughs	3	2	0	1	44	42	+2	4
Ederney St Joseph's	3	1	1	1	49	45	+4	3
Enniskillen Gaels	3	1	1	1	47	49	-2	3
Teemore Shamrocks	3	1	0	2	42	46	-4	2

==== Round 1 ====
4 September 2026 Round 1	Enniskillen Gaels	0-12 (12) – (15) 1-12	Belnaleck Art McMurroughs	Enniskillen
20:00 IST (UTC+1)				Venue: Brewster Park
		Report

5 September 2026 Round 1	Teemore Shamrocks	0-14 (14) – (13) 1-10	Ederney St Joseph's	Teemore
16:00 IST (UTC+1)				Venue: St Mary's Park
		Report

==== Round 2 ====
12 September 2026 Round 2	Ederney St Joseph's	2-11 (17) – (17) 0-17	Enniskillen Gaels	Ederney
16:30 IST (UTC+1)				Venue: St Joseph's Park
		Report

13 September 2026 Round 2	Belnaleck Art McMurroughs	0-15 (15) – (11) 0-11	Teemore Shamrocks	Bellanaleck
13:30 IST (UTC+1)				Venue: Belnaleck GAA Grounds
		Report

==== Round 3 ====
27 September 2026 Round 3	Ederney St Joseph's	2-13 (19) – (14) 0-14	Belnaleck Art McMurroughs	Tempo
15:00 IST (UTC+1)				Venue: St Patrick's Park
		Report

27 September 2026 Round 3	Enniskillen Gaels	1-15 (18) – (17) 0-17	Teemore Shamrocks	Donagh
15:00 IST (UTC+1)				Venue: Louis Leonard Memorial Park
		Report

== Relegation Playoff ==
=== Relegation Final ===
4 October 2026 Relegation Final	Lisnaskea Emmetts	0-21 (21) – (21) 1-18 (a.e.t.)	Teemore Shamrocks	Donagh
16:00 IST (UTC+1)				Venue: Louis Leonard Memorial Park
		Report

=== Replay ===
9 October 2026 Relegation Final Replay	Lisnaskea Emmetts	0-10 (10) – (14) 1-11	Teemore Shamrocks	Tempo
19:30 IST (UTC+1)				Venue: St Patrick's Park

== Knockout Stages ==
=== Bracket ===
Quarter-finals
3 October, Ederney
Ederney St Joseph's	3-16
Irvinestown St Molaise	1-18
4 October, Derrygonnelly
Derrygonnelly Harps	0-23
Enniskillen Gaels	1-15

Semi-finals
11 October, Enniskillen
Ederney St Joseph's	3-10
Erne Gaels	1-22
11 October, Enniskillen
Derrygonnelly Harps	0-15
Belnaleck Art McMurroughs	0-14

Final
25 October, Enniskillen
Erne Gaels	1-21
Derrygonnelly Harps	1-12

=== Quarter-Finals ===
3 October 2026 Quarter-Final	Ederney St Joseph's	3-16 (25) – (21) 1-18	Irvinestown St Molaise	Ederney
16:30 IST (UTC+1)				Venue: St Joseph's Park
		Report

4 October 2026 Quarter-Final	Derrygonnelly Harps	0-23 (23) – (18) 1-15	Enniskillen Gaels	Derrygonnelly
14:00 IST (UTC+1)				Venue: Canon Maguire Park
		Report

=== Semi-Finals ===
Semi-final pairings were confirmed on 4 October 2026.

11 October 2026 Semi-Final	Erne Gaels	1-22 (25) – (19) 3-10	Ederney St Joseph's	Enniskillen
14:00 IST (UTC+1)				Venue: Brewster Park

11 October 2026 Semi-Final	Belnaleck Art McMurroughs	0-14 (14) – (15) 0-15	Derrygonnelly Harps	Enniskillen
16:30 IST (UTC+1)				Venue: Brewster Park

=== Final ===
25 October 2026
15:30 GMT (UTC+0)
Final

Report

Erne Gaels	1-21 (24) – (15) 1-12	Derrygonnelly Harps
(HT: 1-09 – 0-06)
Pts: Ultan Kelm 1-7 (1f, 1tpf, 1'45, 1tp), Dan McCann 0-4 (1tp), Aogan Kelm 0-2, Brian Mullin 0-2, Jack McCann 0-2, Tommy McCaffrey 0-2, Shane Mimna 0-1, Ultan O'Reilly 0-1		Pts: Gary McKenna 0-5 (1f), Michael Duffy 1-0, Jarlath Flanagan 0-2 (tp), Jack Kelly 0-2 (tpf), Oisín Smyth 0-1, Rian McGovern 0-1, Lee Jones 0-1

Brewster Park, Enniskillen
