= 2024 Fermanagh Senior Football Championship =

2024 Mannok Fermanagh Senior Football Championship
Tournament details
- County: Fermanagh
- Province: Ulster
- Level: Senior
- Year: 2024
- Trophy: New York Cup
- Sponsor: Mannok
- Date: 30 August – 2 November 2024
- Teams: 8
- Defending champions: Derrygonnelly Harps

Winners
- Champions: Erne Gaels Belleek (3rd win)
- Manager: Declan Bonner
- Captain: Ryan Lyons
- Qualify for: Ulster Club SFC

Runners-up
- Runners-up: Enniskillen Gaels
- Manager: Simon Bradley
- Captain: Conor McShea

Promotion/Relegation
- Relegated team(s): Devenish St Mary's

The 2024 Fermanagh Senior Football Championship was the 118th edition of Fermanagh GAA's premier club Gaelic football tournament for senior clubs in County Fermanagh, Northern Ireland. The championship consisted of eight teams, with the winner going on to represent Fermanagh in the Ulster Senior Club Football Championship. The championship began on 30 August 2024.

Derrygonnelly Harps were the defending champions, but lost in the semi-final to Erne Gaels Belleek.

Erne Gaels were set to face Enniskillen Gaels in the final on 20 October, but the match was postponed due to a storm. The rescheduled match took place a week later, and finished in a draw. The replay took place on 2 November, with Erne Gaels finally winning by four points. This was the club's third title in total and their first in 43 years.

== Team changes ==
The following teams have changed division since the 2023 championship season.

=== To Championship ===
Promoted from 2023 Intermediate Championship

- Teemore Shamrocks (Intermediate Champions)

=== From Championship ===
Relegated to 2023 Intermediate Championship

- Roslea Shamrocks (Relegation play-off losers)

== Group stage ==
=== Group A ===
Pos	Team	Pld	W	D	L	PF	PA	PD	Pts	Qualification or relegation
1	Enniskillen Gaels	3	3	0	0	51	29	+22	6	Advance to semi-final
2	Kinawley Brian Borus	3	1	1	1	30	26	+4	3	Advance to quarter-final
3	Teemore Shamrocks	3	1	0	2	29	40	−11	2	Advance to quarter-final
4	Belnaleck Art McMurroughs	3	0	1	2	30	45	−15	1	Advance to relegation final

Source: Fermanagh GAA

30 August 2024 Round 1	Enniskillen Gaels	2–6 – 0–9	Teemore Shamrocks	Enniskillen
20:00				Stadium: Brewster Park; Referee: Hugh Breen

31 August 2024 Round 1	Kinawley Brian Borus	0–6 – 0–6	Belnaleck Art McMurroughs	Kinawley
18:00				Stadium: Patrick McManus Park; Referee: Gerard Gallagher

7 September 2024 Round 2	Teemore Shamrocks	0–7 – 1–14	Kinawley Brian Borus	Teemore
15:30				Stadium: St Mary's Park; Referee: Niall Cullen

7 September 2024 Round 2	Belnaleck Art McMurroughs	0–13 – 5–11	Enniskillen Gaels	Belnaleck
18:00				Stadium: Belnaleck GAA Grounds; Referee: Gerard McLaughlin

21 September 2024 Round 3	Enniskillen Gaels	2–7 – 0–7	Kinawley Brian Borus	Tempo
16:00				Stadium: St Patrick's Park; Referee: Michael Keown

21 September 2024 Round 3	Belnaleck Art McMurroughs	1–8 – 2–7	Teemore Shamrocks	Donagh
16:00				Stadium: Louis Leonard Memorial Park; Referee: Eoin Murphy

=== Group B ===
Pos	Team	Pld	W	D	L	PF	PA	PD	Pts	Qualification or relegation
1	Derrygonnelly Harps	3	2	1	0	48	34	+14	5	Advance to semi-final
2	Erne Gaels Belleek	3	2	0	1	36	30	+6	4	Advance to quarter-final
3	Ederney St Joseph's	3	1	0	2	34	46	−12	2	Advance to quarter-final
4	Devenish St Mary's	3	0	1	2	36	44	−8	1	Advance to relegation final

Source: Fermanagh GAA

1 September 2024 Round 1	Erne Gaels Belleek	0–13 – 2–3	Ederney St Joseph's	Belleek
12:45				Stadium: Páirc na hEirne; Referee: Barry Monaghan

1 September 2024 Round 1	Derrygonnelly Harps	1–12 – 2–9	Devenish St Mary's	Derrygonnelly
15:00				Stadium: Canon Maguire Park; Referee: James Lewis

8 September 2024 Round 2	Devenish St Mary's	0–9 – 0–12	Erne Gaels Belleek	Garrison
13:00				Stadium: St Mary's Park; Referee: Oliver McShea

8 September 2024 Round 2	Ederney St Joseph's	0–8 – 3–12	Derrygonnelly Harps	Ederney
16:00				Stadium: St Joseph's Park; Referee: Eoin Murphy

21 September 2024 Round 3	Derrygonnelly Harps	1–9 – 1–8	Erne Gaels Belleek	Irvinestown
16:00				Stadium: St Molaise Park; Referee: Kevin Donnelly

21 September 2024 Round 3	Ederney St Joseph's	1–14 – 0–12	Devenish St Mary's	Derrylin
16:00				Stadium: O'Connell Park; Referee: Noel McDonagh

== Knock-out stage ==
Quarter-finals
Kinawley	0–15
Ederney	1–13
Erne Gaels	0–9
Teemore	0–7

Semi-finals
Ederney	2–8
Enniskillen Gaels	4–13
Derrygonnelly	0–9
Erne Gaels	0–10

Final
Enniskillen Gaels	0–8; 1–9 (R)
Erne Gaels	0–8; 1–13 (R)

=== Quarter-finals ===
28 September 2024 Quarter-final	Erne Gaels Belleek	0–9 – 0–7	Teemore Shamrocks	Belleek
15:30		Report		Stadium: Páirc na hEirne; Referee: Gerard McLaughlin

29 September 2024 Quarter-final	Kinawley Brian Borus	0–15 – 1–13 (a.e.t.)	Ederney St Joseph's	Kinawley
13:00		Report		Stadium: Patrick McManus Park; Referee: James Lewis

=== Semi-finals ===
6 October 2024 Semi-final	Ederney St Joseph's	2–8 – 4–13	Enniskillen Gaels	Tempo
13:00		Report		Stadium: St Patrick's Park; Referee: Gerard Gallagher

6 October 2024 Semi-final	Derrygonnelly Harps	0–9 – 0–10	Erne Gaels Belleek	Kinawley
16:30		Report		Stadium: Patrick McManus Park; Referee: Eoin Murphy

=== Final ===
27 October 2024 Final	Enniskillen Gaels	0–8 – 0–8	Erne Gaels Belleek	Enniskillen
16:00	Eoin Beacom 0–2 (0–1f), Ethan Beresford 0–2, Ross Bogue 0–1 (0–1 '45), John Reihill 0–1 (0–1f), Conor Murphy 0–1, Conor Love 0–1	Report	Ultán Kelm 0–3 (0–1f), Dan McCann 0–3, Oisín Kelm 0–1, Aogán Kelm 0–1	Stadium: Brewster Park; Referee: Nigel Sweeney; Man of the Match: Dan McCann (Erne Gaels)

2 November 2024 Final replay	Enniskillen Gaels	1–9 – 1–13	Erne Gaels Belleek	Enniskillen
17:00	Conor Love 1–1, Brandon Horan 0–2, Callum Jones 0–2 (0–2f), Conor McShea 0–1, Ethan Beresford 0–1, Conall Quinn 0–1, John Reihill 0–1 (0–1f)	Report	Ultán Kelm 0–5 (0–2f), Michael Óg McGarrigle 1–0, Shane Rooney 0–3 (0–1m), Aogán Kelm 0–1, Tommy McCaffrey 0–1, Oisín Kelm 0–1, Barry McCann 0–1, Seamus Ryder 0–1	Stadium: Brewster Park; Referee: Eoin Murphy; Man of the Match: Ultán Kelm (Erne Gaels)

== Relegation play-off ==
=== Relegation Final ===
28 September 2024 Relegation Final	Belnaleck Art McMurroughs	2–16 – 0–13	Devenish St Mary's	Derrygonnelly
17:30		Report		Stadium: Canon Maguire Park; Referee: Nigel Sweeney
