= 2025 Fermanagh Senior Football Championship =

2025 Mannok Fermanagh Senior Football Championship
Tournament details
- County: Fermanagh
- Province: Ulster
- Level: Senior
- Year: 2025
- Trophy: New York Cup
- Sponsor: Mannok
- Date: 29 August – 25 October 2025
- Teams: 8
- Defending champions: Erne Gaels Belleek

Winners
- Champions: Erne Gaels Belleek (4th win)
- Manager: Declan Bonner
- Captain: Ryan Lyons
- Qualify for: Ulster Club SFC

Runners-up
- Runners-up: Derrygonnelly Harps
- Manager: Sean Flanagan
- Captain: Shane McGullion

Promotion/Relegation
- Relegated team(s): Kinawley Brian Borus

The 2025 Fermanagh Senior Football Championship was the 119th edition of Fermanagh GAA's premier club Gaelic football tournament for senior clubs in County Fermanagh, Northern Ireland. The championship consisted of eight teams, with the winner going on to represent Fermanagh in the Ulster Senior Club Football Championship. The championship began on 29 August 2025.

Erne Gaels Belleek were the defending champions, and qualified for the final where they faced Derrygonnelly Harps. The final ended in a draw, but Erne Gaels won the replay by three points to successfully defend their title.

== Team changes ==
The following teams have changed division since the 2024 championship season.

=== To Championship ===
Promoted from 2024 Intermediate Championship

- Lisnaskea Emmetts (Intermediate Champions)

=== From Championship ===
Relegated to 2024 Intermediate Championship

- Devenish St Mary's (Relegation play-off losers)

== Group stage ==
=== Group A ===
Pos	Team	Pld	W	D	L	PF	PA	PD	Pts	Qualification or relegation
1	Derrygonnelly Harps	3	3	0	0	50	37	+13	6	Advance to semi-final
2	Belnaleck Art McMurroughs	3	1	1	1	50	48	+2	3	Advance to quarter-final
3	Lisnaskea Emmetts	3	1	1	1	48	52	−4	3	Advance to quarter-final
4	Enniskillen Gaels	3	0	0	3	37	48	−11	0	Advance to relegation final

Source: Fermanagh GAA

29 August 2025 Round 1	Enniskillen Gaels	1–11 – 0–18	Belnaleck Art McMurroughs	Enniskillen
20:00				Stadium: Brewster Park; Referee: James Lewis

31 August 2025 Round 1	Derrygonnelly Harps	3–11 – 2–8	Lisnaskea Emmetts	Derrygonnelly
13:30				Stadium: Canon Maguire Park; Referee: Gerard Gallagher

6 September 2025 Round 2	Belnaleck Art McMurroughs	0–14 – 0–16	Derrygonnelly Harps	Belnaleck
18:30				Stadium: Belnaleck GAA Grounds; Referee: Niall Cullen

7 September 2025 Round 2	Lisnaskea Emmetts	0–16 – 1–11	Enniskillen Gaels	Lisnaskea
18:00				Stadium: Emmett Park; Referee: Gerard McLaughlin

21 September 2025 Round 3	Derrygonnelly Harps	0–14 – 0–9	Enniskillen Gaels	Irvinestown
15:30				Stadium: St Molaise Park; Referee: Niall McCann

21 September 2025 Round 3	Belnaleck Art McMurroughs	0–18 – 3–9	Lisnaskea Emmetts	Donagh
15:30				Stadium: Louis Leonard Memorial Park; Referee: Karol Bradshaw

=== Group B ===
Pos	Team	Pld	W	D	L	PF	PA	PD	Pts	Qualification or relegation
1	Ederney St Joseph's	3	2	1	0	72	48	+24	5	Advance to semi-final
2	Erne Gaels Belleek	3	1	2	0	51	46	+5	4	Advance to quarter-final
3	Teemore Shamrocks	3	1	0	2	44	49	−5	2	Advance to quarter-final
4	Kinawley Brian Borus	3	0	1	2	39	63	−24	1	Advance to relegation final

Source: Fermanagh GAA

30 August 2025 Round 1	Teemore Shamrocks	0–13 – 0–10	Kinawley Brian Borus	Teemore
18:30				Stadium: St Mary's Park; Referee: Nigel Sweeney

31 August 2025 Round 1	Erne Gaels Belleek	1–14 – 0–17	Ederney St Joseph's	Belleek
16:30				Stadium: Páirc na hEirne; Referee: Eoin Murphy

6 September 2025 Round 2	Ederney St Joseph's	2–17 – 2–14	Teemore Shamrocks	Ederney
18:30				Stadium: St Joseph's Park; Referee: Oliver McShea

7 September 2025 Round 2	Kinawley Brian Borus	1–15 – 1–15	Erne Gaels Belleek	Kinawley
13:30				Stadium: Patrick McManus Park; Referee: Barry Monaghan

21 September 2025 Round 3	Teemore Shamrocks	2–5 – 0–16	Erne Gaels Belleek	Tempo
15:30				Stadium: St Patrick's Park; Referee: Hugh Breen

21 September 2025 Round 3	Ederney St Joseph's	4–20 – 2–5	Kinawley Brian Borus	Garrison
15:30				Stadium: St Mary's Park; Referee: Gerard Gallagher

== Knock-out stage ==
Quarter-finals
Erne Gaels	1–21
Lisnaskea	2–10
Belnaleck	1–13
Teemore	1–14

Semi-finals
Ederney	2–10
Erne Gaels	2–11
Derrygonnelly	3–16
Teemore	0–8

Final
Erne Gaels	2–14; 1–12 (R)
Derrygonnelly	0–20; 1–9 (R)

=== Quarter-finals ===
27 September 2024 Quarter-final	Erne Gaels Belleek	1–21 – 2–10	Lisnaskea Emmetts	Belleek
17:00				Stadium: Páirc na hEirne; Referee: Nigel Sweeney; Man of the Match: Ryan Lyons (Erne Gaels)

28 September 2025 Quarter-final	Belnaleck Art McMurroughs	1–13 – 1–14	Teemore Shamrocks	Belnaleck
16:30		Report		Stadium: Belnaleck GAA Grounds; Referee: Noel McDonagh; Man of the Match: Damien Lee (Teemore)

=== Semi-finals ===
5 October 2025 Semi-final	Ederney St Joseph's	2–10 – 2–11	Erne Gaels Belleek	Enniskillen
14:30		Report		Stadium: Brewster Park; Referee: Ferghal Cleary; Man of the Match: Oisín Kelm (Erne Gaels)

5 October 2025 Semi-final	Derrygonnelly Harps	3–16 – 0–8	Teemore Shamrocks	Enniskillen
16:45		Report		Stadium: Brewster Park; Referee: James Lewis; Man of the Match: Leigh Jones (Derrygonnelly)

=== Final ===
18 October 2025 Final	Erne Gaels Belleek	2–14 – 0–20	Derrygonnelly Harps	Enniskillen
18:00	Ryan Lyons 0–4 (one 2pt), Aogán Kelm 0–1, Paul Ward 1–0, Brian Mullin 0–2, Shane Rooney 0–2 (0–1f), Barry McCann 0–2, Seamus Ryder 0–2 (0–1f), Ultán Kelm 0–1, Tommy McCaffrey 0–1	Report	Gary McKenna 0–8 (two 2pt, 0–3f), Rian McGovern 0–3, Jarlath Flanagan 0–2, Jack Kelly 0–2 (one 2ptf), Michael Duffy 0–2 (one 2pt), Shane McGullion 0–1, Conall Rasdale 0–1 (0–1f), Rory Smyth 0–1	Stadium: Brewster Park; Referee: Barry Monaghan; Man of the Match: Gary McKenna (Derrygonnelly)

25 October 2025 Final replay	Erne Gaels Belleek	1–12 – 1–9	Derrygonnelly Harps	Enniskillen
18:30	Ultán Kelm 1–3 (one 2pt), Oisín Kelm 0–3, Shane Rooney 0–2 (0–1f), Barry McCann 0–1 (0–1f), Aogán Kelm 0–1, Jack McCann 0–1, Seamus Ryder 0–1	Report	Leigh Jones 1–0, Gary McKenna 0–3 (0–2f), Stephen McGullion 0–2 (one 2pt), Conall Rasdale 0–1 (0–1f) Aidan McKenna 0–1, Michael Jones 0–1, Shane McGullion 0–1	Stadium: Brewster Park; Referee: James Lewis; Man of the Match: Ultán Kelm (Erne Gaels)

== Relegation play-off ==
=== Relegation Final ===
28 September 2025 Relegation Final	Enniskillen Gaels	2–16 – 0–13	Kinawley Brian Borus	Derrygonnelly
13:00				Stadium: Canon Maguire Park; Referee: Barry Monaghan
