= 2023 Fermanagh Senior Football Championship =

2023 Mannok Fermanagh Senior Football Championship
Tournament details
- County: Fermanagh
- Province: Ulster
- Level: Senior
- Year: 2023
- Trophy: New York Cup
- Sponsor: Mannok
- Date: 9 September – 22 October 2023
- Teams: 8
- Defending champions: Enniskillen Gaels

Winners
- Champions: Derrygonnelly Harps (10th win)
- Manager: Sean Flanagan
- Captain: Shane McGullion
- Qualify for: Ulster Club SFC

Runners-up
- Runners-up: Erne Gaels Belleek
- Manager: Seamus Ryder
- Captain: Ryan Lyons

Promotion/Relegation
- Relegated team(s): Roslea Shamrocks

The 2023 Fermanagh Senior Football Championship was the 117th edition of Fermanagh GAA's premier club Gaelic football tournament for senior clubs in County Fermanagh, Northern Ireland. The championship consists of eight teams, with the winner going on to represent Fermanagh in the Ulster Senior Club Football Championship. The championship began on 9 September 2023.

Enniskillen Gaels were the defending champions, but lost to Erne Gaels Belleek in the semi-final.

The final took place on 22 October, between Erne Gaels and Derrygonnelly Harps. Derrygonnelly won the match by 2–8 to 0–9 to win the championship for the 10th time.

== Team changes ==
The following teams have changed division since the 2022 championship season.

=== To Championship ===
Promoted from 2022 Intermediate Championship

- Devenish St Mary's (Intermediate Champions)

=== From Championship ===
Relegated to 2022 Intermediate Championship

- Teemore Shamrocks (Relegation play-off losers)

== Group stage ==
=== Group A ===
Pos	Team	Pld	W	D	L	PF	PA	PD	Pts	Qualification or relegation
1	Derrygonnelly Harps	3	3	0	0	57	35	+22	6	Advance to semi-final
2	Erne Gaels Belleek	3	2	0	1	51	31	+20	4	Advance to quarter-final
3	Belnaleck Art McMurroughs	3	1	0	2	29	54	−25	2	Advance to quarter-final
4	Roslea Shamrocks	3	0	0	3	37	54	−17	0	Advance to relegation final

Source: Fermanagh GAA

10 September 2023 Round 1	Derrygonnelly Harps	2–17 – 2–11	Roslea Shamrocks	Derrygonnelly
13:00				Stadium: Canon Maguire Park; Referee: Karol Bradshaw

10 September 2023 Round 1	Erne Gaels Belleek	3–13 – 0–9	Belnaleck Art McMurroughs	Belleek
15:30				Stadium: Páirc na hEirne; Referee: Barry Monaghan

16 September 2023 Round 2	Roslea Shamrocks	1–6 – 2–13	Erne Gaels Belleek	Roslea
18:00				Stadium: Shamrock Park; Referee: Oliver McShea

17 September 2023 Round 2	Belnaleck Art McMurroughs	0–8 – 1–18	Derrygonnelly Harps	Belnaleck
16:00				Stadium: Belnaleck GAA Grounds; Referee: Gerard McLaughlin

24 September 2023 Round 3	Derrygonnelly Harps	2–7 – 1–7	Erne Gaels Belleek	Garrison
15:30				Stadium: St Mary's Park; Referee: Gerard Gallagher

1 October 2023 Round 3	Roslea Shamrocks	1–8 – 1–9	Belnaleck Art McMurroughs	Donagh
				Stadium: Louis Leonard Memorial Park; Referee: Kevin Donnelly

=== Group B ===
Pos	Team	Pld	W	D	L	PF	PA	PD	Pts	Qualification or relegation
1	Enniskillen Gaels	3	3	0	0	46	26	+20	6	Advance to semi-final
2	Kinawley Brian Borus	3	1	1	1	31	36	−5	3	Advance to quarter-final
3	Ederney St Joseph's	3	1	0	2	41	45	−4	2	Advance to quarter-final
4	Devenish St Mary's	3	0	1	2	42	53	−11	1	Advance to relegation final

Source: Fermanagh GAA

9 September 2023 Round 1	Kinawley Brian Borus	2–9 – 1–12	Devenish St Mary's	Kinawley
18:00		Report		Stadium: Patrick McManus Park; Referee: Hugh Breen

10 September 2023 Round 1	Ederney St Joseph's	0–12 – 2–10	Enniskillen Gaels	Ederney
18:00				Stadium: St Joseph's Park; Referee: Eoin Murphy

15 September 2023 Round 2	Enniskillen Gaels	1–8 – 0–5	Kinawley Brian Borus	Enniskillen
20:00		Report		Stadium: Brewster Park; Referee: Nigel Sweeney

17 September 2023 Round 2	Devenish St Mary's	0–18 – 2–13	Ederney St Joseph's	Garrison
13:00				Stadium: St Mary's Park; Referee: James Lewis

24 September 2023 Round 3	Enniskillen Gaels	2–13 – 0–9	Devenish St Mary's	Derrygonnelly
15:30				Stadium: Canon Maguire Park; Referee: Barry Monaghan

24 September 2023 Round 3	Kinawley Brian Borus	0–11 – 0–10	Ederney St Joseph's	Tempo
15:30				Stadium: St Patrick's Park; Referee: Martin Higgins

== Knock-out stage ==
Quarter-finals
Kinawley	1–15
Belnaleck	2–11
Erne Gaels	0–11
Ederney	1–7

Semi-finals
Derrygonnelly	5–8
Kinawley	3–10
Enniskillen Gaels	0–9
Erne Gaels	1–10

Final
Derrygonnelly	2–8
Erne Gaels	0–9

=== Quarter-finals ===
7 October 2023 Quarter-final	Kinawley Brian Borus	1–15 – 2–11	Belnaleck Art McMurroughs	Kinawley
16:30				Stadium: Patrick McManus Park; Referee: Eoin Murphy

8 October 2023 Quarter-final	Erne Gaels Belleek	0–11 – 1–7	Ederney St Joseph's	Belleek
16:00				Stadium: Páirc na hEirne; Referee: Nigel Sweeney

=== Semi-finals ===
14 October 2023 Semi-final	Derrygonnelly Harps	5–8 – 3–10	Kinawley Brian Borus	Ederney
16:00				Stadium: St Joseph's Park; Referee: Martin Higgins

15 October 2023 Semi-final	Enniskillen Gaels	0–9 – 1–10	Erne Gaels Belleek	Kinawley
13:00				Stadium: Patrick McManus Park; Referee: James Lewis

=== Final ===
22 October 2023 Final	Derrygonnelly Harps	2–8 – 0–9	Erne Gaels Belleek	Enniskillen
14:00	Gary McKenna 1–1, Shane McGullion 1–1, Conall Jones 0–2 (0–1f), Garvan Jones 0–1 (0–1f), Ryan Jones 0–1, Rian McGovern 0–1, Stephen Gilroy 0–1	Report	Ryan Lyons 0–3 (0–2f), Ultán Kelm 0–2 (0–1f), Michael Óg McGarrigle 0–1, Tommy McCaffrey 0–1, Aogán Kelm 0–1, Luke Ryder 0–1	Stadium: Brewster Park; Referee: Gerard McLaughlin; Man of the Match: Oisín Smyth (Derrygonnelly)

== Relegation play-off ==
=== Relegation Final ===
7 October 2023 Relegation Final	Devenish St Mary's	5–10 – 0–9	Roslea Shamrocks	Derrygonnelly
16:30				Stadium: Canon Maguire Park; Referee: Gerard McLaughlin
