= 2022 Fermanagh Senior Football Championship =

2022 Fermanagh SFC
Tournament details
- County: Fermanagh
- Province: Ulster
- Level: Senior
- Year: 2022
- Trophy: New York Cup
- Sponsor: Mannok
- Date: 9 September - 29 October 2022
- Teams: 8
- Defending champions: Derrygonnelly Harps

Winners
- Champions: Enniskillen Gaels (13th win)
- Manager: Simon Bradley
- Captain: Richard O'Callaghan
- Qualify for: 2022 Ulster Club SFC

Runners-up
- Runners-up: Erne Gaels Belleek
- Manager: Seamus Ryder
- Captain: Brian Mullin

Promotion/Relegation
- Relegated team(s): Teemore Shamrocks

The 2022 Fermanagh Senior Football Championship was the 116th edition of the Fermanagh GAA's premier club Gaelic football tournament for senior clubs in County Fermanagh, Northern Ireland. The championship consists of eight teams and had a new group stage format. The championship began on 9 September 2022.

Derrygonnelly Harps were the defending champions, but were beaten by Enniskillen Gaels at the semi-final stage.

The final was due to be played on 23 October, but was postponed due to a waterlogged pitch. The final was played seven days later, and Enniskillen Gaels defeated Erne Gaels Belleek to win their first title since 2006.

== Team changes ==
The following teams have changed division since the 2021 championship season.

=== To Championship ===
Promoted from 2021 Intermediate Championship

- Erne Gaels Belleek - (Intermediate Champions)

=== From Championship ===
Relegated to 2022 Intermediate Championship

- Tempo Maguires - (Relegation Play-off Losers)

== Group stage ==
=== Group A ===
Pos	Team	Pld	W	D	L	PF	PA	PD	Pts	Qualification or relegation
1	Derrygonnelly Harps	3	3	0	0	51	37	+14	6	Advance to semi-final
2	Erne Gaels Belleek	3	1	1	1	39	35	+4	3	Advance to quarter-final
3	Belnaleck Art McMurroughs	3	0	2	1	28	31	−3	2	Advance to quarter-final
4	Teemore Shamrocks	3	0	1	2	30	45	−15	1	Advance to relegation final

Source: Fermanagh GAA

11 September 2022 Round 1	Erne Gaels Belleek	0-8 – 1-5	Belnaleck Art McMurroughs	Belleek
13:00				Stadium: Páirc na hEirne; Referee: Gerard McLaughlin

11 September 2022 Round 1	Derrygonnelly Harps	1-17 – 1-8	Teemore Shamrocks	Derrygonnelly
18:00		Report		Stadium: Canon Maguire Park; Referee: Dermott Love

18 September 2022 Round 2	Belnaleck Art McMurroughs	1-9 – 1-12	Derrygonnelly Harps	Belnaleck
13:00		Report		Stadium: Belnaleck GAA Grounds; Referee: Barry Monaghan

18 September 2022 Round 2	Teemore Shamrocks	0-11 – 1-14	Erne Gaels Belleek	Teemore
15:30				Stadium: St Mary's Park; Referee: Nigel Sweeney

24 September 2022 Round 3	Teemore Shamrocks	0-8 – 0-8	Belnaleck Art McMurroughs	Lisnaskea
17:30				Stadium: Emmett Park; Referee: Eoin Murphy

24 September 2022 Round 3	Erne Gaels Belleek	1-11 – 1-13	Derrygonnelly Harps	Garrison
17:30				Stadium: St Mary's Park; Referee: Gerard Gallagher

=== Group B ===
Pos	Team	Pld	W	D	L	PF	PA	PD	Pts	Qualification or relegation
1	Kinawley Brian Borus	3	3	0	0	41	33	+8	6	Advance to semi-final
2	Enniskillen Gaels	3	2	0	1	49	42	+7	4	Advance to quarter-final
3	Roslea Shamrocks	3	1	0	2	41	48	−7	2	Advance to quarter-final
4	Ederney St Joseph's	3	0	0	3	31	39	−8	0	Advance to relegation final

Source: Fermanagh GAA

9 September 2022 Round 1	Enniskillen Gaels	1-11 – 0-10	Ederney St Joseph's	Enniskillen
20:00		Report		Stadium: Brewster Park; Referee: James Lewis

10 September 2022 Round 1	Kinawley Brian Borus	1-12 – 0-10	Roslea Shamrocks	Kinawley
18:00		Report		Stadium: Patrick McManus Park; Referee: Gerard Gallagher

17 September 2022 Round 2	Ederney St Joseph's	0-12 – 1-10	Kinawley Brian Borus	Ederney
17:00		Report		Stadium: St Joseph's Park; Referee: Niall Cullen

18 September 2022 Round 2	Roslea Shamrocks	2-13 – 4-12	Enniskillen Gaels	Roslea
18:00				Stadium: Shamrock Park; Referee: Eoin Murphy

24 September 2022 Round 3	Roslea Shamrocks	0-12 – 0-9	Ederney St Joseph's	Donagh
17:30				Stadium: Louis Leonard Memorial Park; Referee: Dermott Love

24 September 2022 Round 3	Enniskillen Gaels	0-11 – 0-13	Kinawley Brian Borus	Tempo
17:30				Stadium: St Patrick's Park; Referee: Nigel Sweeney

== Knock-Out Stage ==
Quarter-finals		Semi-finals		Final
		Derrygonnelly	2-11
Enniskillen Gaels	0-14	Enniskillen Gaels	1-15
Belnaleck	1-6			Enniskillen Gaels	3-12
Erne Gaels	1-15			Erne Gaels	0-11
Roslea	0-8	Erne Gaels	1-7
		Kinawley	1-6

=== Quarter-finals ===
30 September 2022 Quarter-final	Enniskillen Gaels	0-14 – 1-6	Belnaleck Art McMurroughs	Enniskillen
20:00		Report		Stadium: Brewster Park; Referee: Gerard Gallagher

2 October 2022 Quarter-final	Erne Gaels Belleek	1-15 – 0-8	Roslea Shamrocks	Belleek
13:00				Stadium: Páirc na hEirne; Referee: Martin Higgins

=== Semi-finals ===
8 October 2022 Semi-final	Derrygonnelly Harps	2-11 – 1-15	Enniskillen Gaels	Tempo
16:00		Report		Stadium: St Patrick's Park; Referee: Gerard McLaughlin

9 October 2022 Semi-final	Erne Gaels Belleek	1-7 – 1-6	Kinawley Brian Borus	Derrygonnelly
16:00				Stadium: Canon Maguire Park; Referee: Barry Monaghan

=== Final ===
30 October 2022
14:30
Final

Enniskillen Gaels	3-12 – 0-11	Erne Gaels Belleek
Conor Love 2-1, Conor McShea 1-0, Callum Jones 0-3 (0-1f), John Reihill 0-2 (0-1f), Conor Watson 0-2, Conor Kelly 0-1 (0-1f), Brandon Horan 0-1, Neil McDermott 0-1, Ciaran Smith 0-1	Report	Ryan Lyons 0-4 (0-4f), Ultán Kelm 0-4, Aogán Kelm 0-1 (0-1f), Odhran Johnston 0-1, Jack McCann 0-1

Brewster Park, Enniskillen
Referee: James Lewis

== Relegation play-off ==
=== Relegation Final ===
1 October 2022 Relegation Final	Ederney St Joseph's	1-13 – 1-11	Teemore Shamrocks	Lisnaskea
16:30				Stadium: Emmett Park; Referee: Barry Monaghan
