= 2017 Fermanagh Senior Football Championship =

2017 Fermanagh SFC
Tournament details
- County: Fermanagh
- Province: Ulster
- Level: Senior
- Year: 2017
- Trophy: New York Cup
- Sponsor: Quinn Building Products
- Date: 26 August - 1 October 2017
- Teams: 8
- Defending champions: Derrygonnelly Harps

Winners
- Champions: Derrygonnelly Harps (6th win)
- Manager: Martin Greene
- Captain: Ryan Jones
- Qualify for: 2017 Ulster Club SFC

Runners-up
- Runners-up: Devenish St Mary's
- Manager: Malachy Cullen
- Captain: Jason Love

Promotion/Relegation
- Relegated team(s): Kinawley Brian Borus

The 2017 Fermanagh Senior Football Championship was the 111th edition of the Fermanagh GAA's premier club Gaelic football tournament for senior clubs in County Fermanagh, Northern Ireland. The tournament consists of 8 teams, with the winner representing Fermanagh in the Ulster Senior Club Football Championship. The championship had a straight knock-out format.

Derrygonnelly Harps were the defending champions, going for their third championship in a row.

Derrygonnelly completed their three in a row by beating Devenish St Mary's in the decider.

== Team changes ==
The following teams have changed division since the 2016 championship season.

=== To Championship ===
Promoted from 2016 Intermediate Championship

- Kinawley Brian Borus – (Intermediate Champions)
- Tempo Maguires – (Intermediate Runners-up)

=== From Championship ===
Relegated to 2017 Intermediate Championship

- Irvinestown St Molaise - (Relegation Play-off Losers)
- St Patrick's Donagh – (Relegation Play-off Losers)

== Bracket ==
Quarter-finals
Kinawley Brian Borus	1-11; 0-9 (R)
Tempo Maguires	1-11; 0-13 (R)
Teemore Shamrocks	1-10; 1-8 (R)
Devenish St Mary's	0-13; 2-13 (R)
Ederney St Joseph's	1-11
Roslea Shamrocks	3-8
Derrygonnelly Harps	2-8
Erne Gaels Belleek	2-6

Semi-finals
Tempo Maguires	0-8
Devenish St Mary's	0-9
Roslea Shamrocks	1-6; 0-10 (R)
Derrygonnelly Harps	0-9; 2-15 (R)

Final
Devenish St Mary's	0-8
Derrygonnelly Harps	0-15

== Quarter-finals ==
26 August 2017 Quarter-final	Kinawley Brian Borus	1-11 – 1-11	Tempo Maguires	Derrylin
16:30				Stadium: O'Connell Park

26 August 2017 Quarter-final	Teemore Shamrocks	1-10 – 0-13	Devenish St Mary's	Derrygonnelly
19:00				Stadium: Canon Maguire Park; Referee: Dermott Love

27 August 2017 Quarter-final	Derrygonnelly Harps	2-8 – 2-6	Erne Gaels Belleek	Enniskillen
13:45				Stadium: Brewster Park; Referee: Martin Higgins

27 August 2017 Quarter-final	Ederney St Joseph's	1-11 – 3-8	Roslea Shamrocks	Tempo
18:30				Stadium: St. Patrick's Park; Referee: Niall Cullen

1 September 2017 Quarter-final replay	Kinawley Brian Borus	0-9 – 0-13	Tempo Maguires	Brookeborough
19:00				Stadium: Brookeborough GAA Grounds; Referee: Eugene McDonagh

2 September 2017 Quarter-final replay	Teemore Shamrocks	1-8 – 2-13	Devenish St Mary's	Enniskillen
19:30				Stadium: Brewster Park; Referee: James Lewis

== Semi-finals ==
8 September 2017 Semi-final	Roslea Shamrocks	1-6 – 0-9	Derrygonnelly Harps	Enniskillen
20:30				Stadium: Brewster Park; Referee: Dermott Love

10 September 2017 Semi-final	Tempo Maguires	0-8 – 0-9	Devenish St Mary's	Enniskillen
15:00				Stadium: Brewster Park; Referee: Joseph Corcoran

15 September 2017 Semi-final replay	Derrygonnelly Harps	2-15 – 0-10	Roslea Shamrocks	Enniskillen
20:30				Stadium: Brewster Park; Referee: Niall Cullen

== Final ==
1 October 2017
16:00
Final

Devenish St Mary's	0-8 – 0-15	Derrygonnelly Harps
Terry O'Flanagan 0-6 (0-6f), Chris O'Brien 0-2	Report	Gary McKenna 0-3 (0-2f), Paul Ward 0-2 (0-1f), Conall Jones 0-2 (0-1f), Leigh Jones 0-2, Declan Cassidy 0-2, Eamon McHugh 0-1 (0-1 45), Ryan Jones 0-1, Garvan Jones 0-1, Kevin Cassidy 0-1

Brewster Park, Enniskillen
Attendance: 3,123
Referee: Gerard McLaughlin

== Relegation Playoffs ==
The four losers of the quarter-finals playoff in this round. The two losers will face off in a relegation final, with the loser to be relegated to the 2018 Intermediate Championship.

=== Relegation semi-finals ===
9 September 2017 Relegation semi-final	Erne Gaels Belleek	3-10 – 1-11	Kinawley Brian Borus	Enniskillen
17:00				Stadium: Brewster Park; Referee: Martin Higgins

10 September 2017 Relegation semi-final	Teemore Shamrocks	1-8 – 2-11	Ederney St Joseph's	Derrygonnelly
13:00				Stadium: Canon Maguire Park; Referee: Oliver McShea

=== Relegation Final ===
23 September 2017 Relegation Final	Teemore Shamrocks	2-10 – 0-7	Kinawley Brian Borus	Derrylin
17:00				Stadium: O'Connell Park; Referee: Joseph Corcoran
