= 2021 Fermanagh Senior Football Championship =

2021 Fermanagh SFC
Tournament details
- County: Fermanagh
- Province: Ulster
- Level: Senior
- Year: 2021
- Trophy: New York Cup
- Sponsor: Mannok
- Date: 8 October - 21 November 2021
- Teams: 8
- Defending champions: Ederney St Joseph's

Winners
- Champions: Derrygonnelly Harps (9th win)
- Manager: Sean Flanagan
- Captain: Ryan Jones
- Qualify for: 2021 Ulster Club SFC

Runners-up
- Runners-up: Enniskillen Gaels
- Manager: John Reihill
- Captain: Richard O'Callaghan

Promotion/Relegation
- Relegated team(s): Tempo Maguires

The 2021 Fermanagh Senior Football Championship was the 115th edition of the Fermanagh GAA's premier club Gaelic football tournament for senior clubs in County Fermanagh, Northern Ireland. The championship consists of eight teams and had a straight knock-out format. The championship began on 8 October 2021.

Ederney St Joseph's entered the championship as defending champions.

Derrygonnelly Harps claimed their sixth title in seven years, and their ninth in total after defeating Enniskillen Gaels in the final.

== Team changes ==
The following teams have changed division since the 2020 championship season.

=== To Championship ===
Promoted from 2020 Intermediate Championship

- Enniskillen Gaels - (Intermediate Champions)

=== From Championship ===
Relegated to 2021 Intermediate Championship

- Erne Gaels Belleek - (Relegation Play-off Losers)

== Bracket ==
Quarter-finals
Derrygonnelly Harps	1-11; 2-13 (R)
Ederney St Joseph's	3-5; 0-9 (R)
Kinawley Brian Borus	3-12
Roslea Shamrocks	0-10
Belnaleck Art McMurroughs	1-11
Teemore Shamrocks	0-11
Enniskillen Gaels	1-10
Tempo Maguires	2-6

Semi-finals
Derrygonnelly Harps	0-15; 0-12 (R)
Kinawley Brian Borus	2-9; 1-5 (R)
Belnaleck Art McMurroughs	0-7
Enniskillen Gaels	2-9

Final
Derrygonnelly Harps	2-8
Enniskillen Gaels	0-5

== Quarter-finals ==
All 8 teams enter the competition at this stage. The four winners progress to the semi-finals while the four losers enter the relegation semi-finals.

8 October 2021 Quarter-final	Kinawley Brian Borus	3-12 – 0-10	Roslea Shamrocks	Enniskillen
20:00				Stadium: Brewster Park; Referee: Nigel Sweeney

9 October 2021 Quarter-final	Belnaleck Art McMurroughs	1-11 – 0-11	Teemore Shamrocks	Enniskillen
20:00				Stadium: Brewster Park; Referee: Gerard Gallagher

15 October 2021 Quarter-final	Derrygonnelly Harps	1-11 – 3-5	Ederney St Joseph's	Enniskillen
20:00				Stadium: Brewster Park; Referee: Dermott Love

17 October 2021 Quarter-final	Enniskillen Gaels	1-10 – 2-6	Tempo Maguires	Ederney
16:00				Stadium: St Joseph's Park; Referee: Gerard McLoughlin

23 October 2021 Quarter-final replay	Derrygonnelly Harps	2-13 – 0-9 (a.e.t.)	Ederney St Joseph's	Enniskillen
19:00				Stadium: Brewster Park; Referee: Barry Monaghan

== Semi-finals ==
30 October 2021 Semi-final	Derrygonnelly Harps	0-15 – 2-9	Kinawley Brian Borus	Enniskillen
19:30				Stadium: Brewster Park; Referee: Gerard McLaughlin

31 October 2021 Semi-final	Belnaleck Art McMurroughs	0-7 – 2-9	Enniskillen Gaels	Ederney
15:00				Stadium: St Joseph's Park; Referee: James Lewis

6 November 2021 Semi-final replay	Derrygonnelly Harps	0-12 – 1-5	Kinawley Brian Borus	Enniskillen
19:00				Stadium: Brewster Park; Referee: Niall Cullen

== Final ==
21 November 2021
15:00
Final

Derrygonnelly Harps	2-8 – 0-5	Enniskillen Gaels
Conall Jones 1-2 (1-0 pen, 0-1f), Stephen McGullion 1-0, Ryan Jones 0-2, Gary McKenna 0-2 (0-1f), Leigh Jones 0-1, Garvan Jones 0-1	Report	Conor Love 0-2 (0-2f), Paddy Reihill 0-1, Eoin Beacom 0-1, Callum Jones 0-1

Brewster Park, Enniskillen
Referee: Barry Monaghan

== Relegation play-offs ==
=== Relegation Semi-finals ===
30 October 2021 Relegation semi-final	Ederney St Joseph's	1-8 – 1-10	Roslea Shamrocks	Tempo
16:00				Stadium: St Patrick's Park; Referee: Niall Cullen

31 October 2021 Relegation semi-final	Teemore Shamrocks	0-12 – 1-6	Tempo Maguires	Derrygonnelly
13:00				Stadium: Canon Maguire Park; Referee: Ferghal Cleary

=== Relegation Final ===
31 October 2021 Relegation Final	Ederney St Joseph's	6-8 – 2-11	Tempo Maguires	Irvinestown
13:30				Stadium: St Molaise Park; Referee: Gerard Gallagher
