= 2023 Ulster Senior Club Football Championship =

Gaelic football competition

2023 AIB Ulster Senior Club Football Championship
Tournament details
- Province: Ulster
- Year: 2023
- Trophy: Seamus McFerran Cup
- Sponsor: Allied Irish Banks
- Date: 5 November – 10 December 2023
- Teams: 9 (one from each of the 9 counties)
- Defending champions: Glen

Winners
- Champions: Glen (2nd win)
- Manager: Malachy O'Rourke
- Captain: Connor Carville
- Qualify for: All-Ireland Club SFC

Runners-up
- Runners-up: Scotstown
- Manager: David McCague
- Captain: Damien McArdle

Other
- Website: Ulster GAA

The 2023 Ulster Senior Club Football Championship is the 55th instalment of the annual competition organised by Ulster GAA. It is one of the four provincial competitions of the 2023–24 All-Ireland Senior Club Football Championship and is played in a straight knockout format. The championship draw was made on 7 September 2023.

Derry's Glen entered the championship as the defending champions, and reached the final for the second year in a row, where they played Monaghan champions Scotstown. Glen won the match by 0–13 to 0–11 to win their second Ulster title.

== Teams ==
The Ulster championship is contested by the winners of the nine county championships in the Irish province of Ulster. Ulster comprises the six counties of Northern Ireland, as well as Cavan, Donegal and Monaghan in the Republic of Ireland.

County	Team	Most recent success	
County	Team	Provincial	County
Antrim	Erin's Own, Cargin		2022
Armagh	Crossmaglen Rangers	2015	2022
Cavan	Gowna		2022
Derry	Watty Graham's, Glen	2022	2022
Donegal	Naomh Conaill		2022
Down	Kilcoo	2021	2022
Fermanagh	Derrygonnelly Harps		2021
Monaghan	Scotstown	1989	2021
Tyrone	Trillick St Macartan's		2019

== Bracket ==
Preliminary round

Quarter-finals

Semi-finals

Final

Glen (Derry)
0–11

Erin's Own, Cargin (Antrim)
0–7

Glen (Derry)
0–10

Naomh Conaill (Donegal)
1–6

Gowna (Cavan)
1–10

Naomh Conaill (Donegal)
2–8

Glen (Derry)
0–13

Scotstown (Monaghan)
0–11

Trillick (Tyrone)
0–9

Crossmaglen Rangers (Armagh)
0–4

Trillick (Tyrone)
1–13

Derrygonnelly Harps (Fermanagh)
1–7

Scotstown (Monaghan)
0–17

Kilcoo (Down)
2–13

Kilcoo (Down)
1–8

Scotstown (Monaghan)
0–12

== Preliminary round ==
5 November 2023
15:45
Preliminary Round

Derrygonnelly Harps (Fermanagh)	1–7 – 2–13	Kilcoo (Down)
Gary McKenna 1–1, Garvan Jones 0–3 (0–2f), Conall Jones 0–2 (0–1f), Ryan Jones 0–1	Report	Paul Devlin 1–3 (1–0 pen, 0–3f), Sean Óg McCusker 1–1, Ryan Johnston 0–2, Eugene Branagan 0–2, Niall Kane 0–1 (0–1 '45), Ryan McEvoy 0–1, Darryl Branagan 0–1, Aaron Morgan 0–1, Ceilum Doherty 0–1

Brewster Park, Enniskillen
Referee: Martin McNally (Monaghan)
Programme

== Quarter-finals ==
12 November 2023
15:00
Quarter-final 1

Glen (Derry)	0–11 – 0–7	Erin's Own, Cargin (Antrim)
Emmett Bradley 0–4 (0–4f), Danny Tallon 0–2 (0–2f), Jack Doherty 0–2, Michael Warnock 0–1, Ciaran McFaul 0–1, Ethan Doherty 0–1	Report	Pat Shivers 0–3 (0–3f), Michael McCann 0–2 (0–2f), Paul McCann 0–1, Kieran Close 0–1

Celtic Park, Derry
Referee: Conor Dourneen (Cavan)
Programme

12 November 2023
16:30
Quarter-final 2

Gowna (Cavan)	1–10 – 2–8	Naomh Conaill (Donegal)
Conor Brady 1–1, Cian Madden 0–2 (0–1f), Oisin Pierson 0–1 (0–1f), Conor Casey 0–1 (0–1m), Conor Madden 0–1 Mark McKeever 0–1, Ryan Donohoe 0–1, Tiarnan Madden 0–1, Robbie Fitzpatrick 0–1	Report	Leo McLoone 1–1, Kevin McGettigan 1–0, Odhran Doherty 0–2, John O'Malley 0–1 (0–1f), A. J. Gallagher 0–1, Brendan McDyer 0–1, Eunan Dohery 0–1, Jeaic McKelvey 0–1

Kingspan Breffni, Cavan
Referee: Kevin Faloon (Armagh)
Programme

11 November 2023
19:15
Quarter-final 3

Trillick (Tyrone)	0–9 – 0–4	Crossmaglen Rangers (Armagh)
Lee Brennan 0–2 (0–1f), Richie Donnelly 0–2, Ryan Gray 0–2, James Garrity 0–2, Ciaran Daly 0–1	Report	Rían O'Neill 0–2 (0–2f), Jamie Clarke 0–2

O'Neills Healy Park, Omagh
Referee: Barry Cassidy (Derry)
Programme

12 November 2023
15:15
Quarter-final 4

Kilcoo (Down)	1–8 – 0–12	Scotstown (Monaghan)
Paul Devlin 1–1 (1–0 pen, 0–1f), Niall Kane 0–1 (0–1f), Miceal Rooney 0–1, Darryl Branagan 0–1, Eugene Branagan 0–1, Aaron Morgan 0–1, Shealan Johnston 0–1, Anthony Morgan 0–1	Report	Rory Beggan 0–3 (0–2f), Shane Carey 0–2 (0–1f), Jack McCarron 0–2 (0–1f), Jason Carey 0–2 (0–1m), Kieran Hughes 0–1 (0–1m), Conor McCarthy 0–1, Donal Morgan 0–1

Páirc Esler, Newry
Referee: Noel Mooney (Cavan)
Programme

== Semi-finals ==
25 November 2023
17:30
Semi-final

Glen (Derry)	0–10 – 1–6	Naomh Conaill (Donegal)
Emmett Bradley 0–3 (0–2f), Conleth McGuckian 0–3 (0–1m), Cathal Mulholland 0–2, Jody McDermott 0–1, Stevie O'Hara 0–1	Report	Ciarán Thompson 0–3, John O'Malley 1–0 (1–0 pen), Ethan O'Donnell 0–1, Brendan McDyer 0–1, A. J. Gallagher 0–1

O'Neills Healy Park, Omagh
Referee: Sean Hurson (Tyrone)
Programme

26 November 2023
13:00
Semi-final

Trillick (Tyrone)	1–13 – 0–17 (a.e.t.)	Scotstown (Monaghan)
Lee Brennan 0–5 (0–3f, 0–1 '45), Seanie O'Donnell 1–1, Rory Brennan 0–1, Richie Donnelly 0–1, Ciaran Daly 0–1, Ryan Gray 0–1, Daniel Donnelly 0–1, James Garrity 0–1, Colm Garrity 0–1	Report	Jack McCarron 0–4 (0–3f), Shane Carey 0–3 (0–2f), Kieran Hughes 0–2, Mattie Maguire 0–2, Rory Beggan 0–1 (0–1 '45), Ryan O'Toole 0–1, Conor McCarthy 0–1, Donal Morgan 0–1, Emmett Caulfield 0–1, Michael McCarville 0–1

Box-It Athletic Grounds, Armagh
Referee: Kevin Faloon (Armagh)
Programme

== Final ==
10 December 2023
16:00
Final

Glen (Derry)	0–13 – 0–11	Scotstown (Monaghan)
Danny Tallon 0–3 (0–2f), Eunan Mulholland 0–3, Conor Glass 0–2 (0–1f), Ryan Dougan 0–1, Ethan Doherty 0–1, Tiarnán Flanagan 0–1, Ciaran McFaul 0–1, Jody McDermott 0–1	Report	Shane Carey 0–3 (0–3f), Kieran Hughes 0–2, James Hamill 0–2, Jack McCarron 0–1, Conor McCarthy 0–1, Darren Hughes 0–1, Rory Beggan 0–1

Box-It Athletic Grounds, Armagh
Attendance: 6,027
Referee: Paul Faloon (Down)
Programme
