= Ulster Minor Club Football Championship =

Irish Gaelic football tournament

- Irish: Comórtas Pheil Mhionúr Chumann Uladh
- Code: Gaelic football
- Founded: 1982; 44 years ago
- Region: Ulster, Ireland (GAA)
- Trophy: Jim McConville Cup
- Title holders: Four Masters (2nd title)
- Most titles: Ballinderry & Glen (4 titles)
- Sponsors: FonaCAB Belfast

The Ulster Minor Club Football Championship (Irish: Comórtas Pheil Mhionúr Chumann Uladh), often referred to as the St. Paul's Tournament, an annual Gaelic football tournament organised and hosted by the St Paul's club in Belfast. It is played between the Minor championship winners from each of the nine counties of Ulster. The competition has a straight knock-out format. It was first held in 1982 and the winners are awarded the Jimmy McConville Cup.

While unofficial, it is regarded as the Ulster Club Championship for club minor teams. The competition begins in late November or early December with the final taking place in January, typically on New Year's Day (e.g. the 2017 final took place on 1 January 2018).

Derry clubs have won the competition eighteen times, more than any other county. Ballinderry and Glen are the most successful clubs, having both won the competition four times, with Glen's four titles being won consecutively. The current champions are Four Masters from Donegal.

== List of finals ==
List of Ulster Minor Club Football Championship finals
Year	Winners		Score	Runners-up		Winning captain	Man of the match	Ref
Year	Club	County	Score	Club	County	Winning captain	Man of the match	Ref
1982	St Paul's	Antrim	2–9 – 2–4	Scotstown	Monaghan	Fergus Donnelly		
1983	Saul	Down	1–15 – 0–9	Lisnaskea Emmetts	Fermanagh	Eddie Harney		
1984	Killybegs	Donegal	4–9 – 3–5	St Paul's	Antrim			
1985	Killybegs	Donegal	2–5 – 0–8	Patrick Sarsfields	Antrim			
1986	St Paul's	Antrim	5–9 – 0–8	Enniskillen Gaels	Fermanagh	Gerard Kelly		
1987	Killeavy	Armagh	2–9 – 0–6	Enniskillen Gaels	Fermanagh	Shane O'Neill		
1988	Enniskillen Gaels	Fermanagh	1–9 – 1–9 (aet)	Maghery	Armagh	Simon Bradley		
1988	Enniskillen Gaels	Fermanagh	2–6 – 1–5 (R)	Maghery	Armagh	Simon Bradley		
1989	Dungannon	Tyrone	1–08 – 1–07	St Paul's	Antrim			
1990	Dungiven	Derry	1–10 – 1–09	Aodh Ruadh	Donegal			
1991	Bellaghy	Derry	2–06 – 1–07	Cavan Gaels	Cavan	Karl Diamond		
1992	Aodh Ruadh	Donegal	4–08 – 1–06	Clan na Gael	Armagh			
1993	Loup	Derry	1–11 – 1–06	St Eunan's	Donegal			
1994	Bellaghy	Derry	7–05 – 2–05	Dungannon	Tyrone			
1995	Loup	Derry		Clontibret O'Neills	Monaghan	Johnny McBride		
1996	Ballinderry	Derry	0–14 – 0–07	Killeavy	Armagh	Darrell McKee	Gerard Cassidy	
1997	Ballinderry	Derry	2–07 – 1–04	Eglish	Tyrone		Darren McGeehan	
1998	Slaughtneil	Derry	1–09 – 1–08	Ardboe	Tyrone	Niall Convery	Kevin O'Neill	
1999	Cavan Gaels	Cavan	3–09 – 2–07	Slaughtneil	Derry	Dominic Reilly	Richard Graham	
2000	Pearse Óg	Armagh	1–12 – 0–14	Cavan Gaels	Cavan	Pauric Duffy	Pauric Duffy	
2001	Ballinderry	Derry	3–07 – 1–09	Clontibret O'Neills	Monaghan	Thomas Maynes	Thomas Maynes	
2002	Clontibret O'Neills	Monaghan	2–14 – 0–4	Armagh Harps	Armagh	Jonathan McGuigan	Paul McGuigan	
2003	Armagh Harps	Armagh	1–11 – 0–7	Carrickmacross Emmets	Monaghan	Joe Quigley	Ciaran Clifford	
2004	Rostrevor	Down	2–7 – 1–8	Kilrea	Derry	Shaun Parr	Colm Clerkin	
2005	Errigal Ciarán	Tyrone	1–13 – 1–11	Killybegs	Donegal	Barry Canavan	Ronan McRory	
2006	Coalisland	Tyrone	1–14 – 2–10	Cavan Gaels	Cavan	Brian Toner; Stephen McNally	Brian Toner	
2007	Kilrea	Derry	2–9 – 0–9	Errigal Ciarán	Tyrone	James Kielt		
2008	Ballinderry	Derry	2–8 – 2–7	Scotstown	Monaghan	Gavin McGeehan	Ryan Scullion	
2009	Omagh St Enda's	Tyrone	0–12 – 0–11	Kilcoo	Down	Barry Tierney	Conan Grugan	
2010	Lámh Dhearg	Antrim	0–9 – 0–8	Magherafelt	Derry	Declan Stranney	Declan Stranney	
2011	Glen	Derry	4–12 – 0–6	Armagh Harps	Armagh	Emmett Bradley	Emmett Bradley	
2012	Glen	Derry	4–7 – 1–7	Killeavy	Armagh	Ciaran McFaul	Ryan Dougan	
2013	Glen	Derry	0–10 – 1–2	Silverbridge	Armagh	Stevie O'Hara	Paul Gunning	
2014	Glen	Derry	1–17 – 2–8 (aet)	Southern Gaels	Cavan	Cathal Mulholland	Danny Tallon	
2015	Crossmaglen Rangers	Armagh	4–12 – 1–6	St Eunan's	Donegal	Michael McCabe	Oisín O'Neill	
2016	Burren	Down	4–8 – 3–5	Kilrea	Derry	Conor Cox; Darragh Murdock	Conor Cox	
2017	Enniskillen Gaels	Fermanagh	1–6 – 0–6	Ballinascreen	Derry	Eoin Beacom	Eoin Beacom	
2018	Bellaghy	Derry	6–11 – 0–8	Crossmaglen Rangers	Armagh	Paul Cassidy	Kealan Friel	
2019	Lavey	Derry	0–9 – 0–8	Termon	Donegal	Cormac Collins	Enda Downey	
2020	Competition cancelled due to COVID-19 pandemic							
2021	Competition cancelled due to COVID-19 pandemic							
2022	Dungiven	Derry	2–7 – 1–8	Four Masters	Donegal	Eoin Higgins; Odhran Murphy	Dara McGonigle	
2023	Four Masters	Donegal	1–10 – 2–4	Cavan Gaels	Cavan	Callum McCrea	Conor McCahill	
2024	Four Masters	Donegal	1–8 – 0–9	Magherafelt	Derry	Callum McCrea	Kevin Muldoon	

== Performances by county ==
Performances in the Ulster Minor Club Football Championship by county
County	Titles	Runners-up	Years won	Years runners-up
Derry	18	6	1990, 1991, 1993, 1994, 1995, 1996, 1997, 1998, 2001, 2007, 2008, 2011, 2012, 2013, 2014, 2018, 2019, 2022	1999, 2004, 2010, 2016, 2017, 2024
Donegal	5	6	1984, 1985, 1992, 2023, 2024	1990, 1993, 2005, 2015, 2019, 2022
Armagh	4	8	1987, 2000, 2003, 2015	1988, 1992, 1996, 2002, 2011, 2012, 2013, 2018
Tyrone	4	4	1989, 2005, 2006, 2009	1994, 1997, 1998, 2007
Antrim	3	3	1982, 1986, 2010	1984, 1985, 1989
Down	3	1	1983, 2004, 2016	2009
Fermanagh	2	3	1988, 2017	1983, 1986, 1987
Cavan	1	5	1999	1991, 2000, 2006, 2014, 2023
Monaghan	1	5	2002	1982, 1995, 2001, 2003, 2008

== Performances by club ==
Performances in the Ulster Minor Club Football Championship by club
Club	Titles	Runners-up	Years won	Years runners-up
Ballinderry	4	0	1996, 1997, 2001, 2008	—
Glen	4	0	2011, 2012, 2013, 2014	—
Bellaghy	3	0	1991, 1994, 2018	—
St Paul's	2	2	1982, 1986	1984, 1989
Enniskillen Gaels	2	2	1988, 2017	1986, 1987
Killybegs	2	1	1984, 1985	2005
Four Masters	2	1	2023, 2024	2022
Dungiven	2	0	1990, 2022	—
Loup	2	0	1993, 1995	—
Cavan Gaels	1	4	1999	1991, 2000, 2006, 2023
Killeavy	1	2	1987	1996, 2012
Clontibret O'Neills	1	2	2002	1995, 2001
Armagh Harps	1	2	2003	2002, 2011
Kilrea	1	2	2007	2004, 2016
Dungannon	1	1	1989	1994
Aodh Ruadh	1	1	1992	1990
Slaughtneil	1	1	1998	1999
Errigal Ciarán	1	1	2005	2007
Crossmaglen Rangers	1	1	2015	2018
Saul	1	0	1983	—
Pearse Óg	1	0	2000	—
Rostrevor	1	0	2004	—
Coalisland	1	0	2006	—
Omagh St Enda's	1	0	2009	—
Lámh Dhearg	1	0	2010	—
Burren	1	0	2016	—
Lavey	1	0	2019	—
Scotstown	0	2	—	1982, 2008
St Eunan's	0	2	—	1993, 2015
Magherafelt	0	2	—	2010, 2024
Lisnaskea Emmetts	0	1	—	1983
Patrick Sarsfields	0	1	—	1985
Maghery	0	1	—	1988
Clan na Gael	0	1	—	1992
Eglish	0	1	—	1997
Ardboe	0	1	—	1998
Carrickmacross Emmets	0	1	—	2003
Kilcoo	0	1	—	2009
Silverbridge	0	1	—	2013
Southern Gaels	0	1	—	2014
Ballinascreen	0	1	—	2017
Termon	0	1	—	2019

== See also ==
- Ulster Senior Club Football Championship
