= Paul Coyle =

Northern Irish Gaelic footballer and selector (1967–2024)

Personal information
- Nickname: Coyler
- Born: 1967 Belleek, Northern Ireland
- Died: 17 June 2024 (aged 56) Swatragh, Northern Ireland
- Occupation: General manager
- Height: 5 ft 10 in (178 cm)

Sport
- Sport: Gaelic football
- Position: Left corner-forward
Clubs
- Years: Club
- Devenish St Mary's; Swatragh
Club titles
- Fermanagh titles: 5
College
- Years: College
- Ulster University
College titles
- Sigerson titles: 1
Inter-county
- Years: County
- 1984–1995: Fermanagh
Inter-county titles
- Ulster titles: 0
- All-Irelands: 0
- NFL: 0
- All Stars: 0

Paul Coyle (1967 – 17 June 2024) was a Gaelic footballer and selector from Northern Ireland. At club level he played with Devenish St Mary's and Swatragh and at inter-county level with the Fermanagh senior football team.

== Playing career ==
Coyle first played Gaelic football at juvenile and underage levels with the Devenish St Mary's. After progressing to the club's senior team he went on to win five Fermanagh SFC titles in an 11-year period between 1985 and 1996. He later transferred to the Swatragh club in Derry. Coyle also lined out for Ulster University and was part of a Ryan Cup–Sigerson Cup double in 1987.

At inter-county level, Coyle first played for Fermanagh as a member of the minor team in 1984. He later progressed to the under-21 team but ended his underage career without success. Coyle was still eligible for the minor grade when he made his senior team debut in a National Football League game in 1984. His inter-county career ended in 1995.

== Coaching career ==
Coyle was part of Malachy O'Rourke's management team when he took charge of the Fermanagh senior team in 2007. During his tenure with the team, Fermanagh qualified for their first Ulster SFC final in 26 years but lost to Armagh after a replay.

== Death ==
Coyle died suddenly on 17 June 2024, at the age of 56.

== Honours ==
Ulster University

- Sigerson Cup: 1987
- Ryan Cup: 1987

Devenish St Mary's

- Fermanagh Senior Football Championship: 1985, 1989, 1990, 1993, 1996
