= Joe Pat Prunty =

Irish Gaelic footballer and businessman (1932–2021)

Personal information
- Native name: Seosamh Pádraig Ó Prionntaigh (Irish)
- Born: 1932 Roslea, Northern Ireland
- Died: 29 January 2021 (aged 88) Enniskillen, Northern Ireland
- Occupation: Businessman

Sport
- Sport: Gaelic football
- Position: Full-back
Club
- Years: Club
- Roslea Shamrocks
Club titles
- Fermanagh titles: 4
Inter-county
- Years: County
- 1955-1959: Fermanagh (junior)

Joseph Patrick Prunty MBE (1932 – 29 January 2021) was a Northern Irish businessman and Gaelic footballer who played for club side Roslea Shamrocks and was a member of the Fermanagh junior football team that won the 1959 All-Ireland Junior Championship.

== Biography ==
Born in Rosslea, Prunty was immersed in Gaelic football from a young age and was part of an Roslea Shamrocks team which won four County Senior Championships in succession from 1955 to 1958. He was also a substitute on the Fermanagh junior team that won the All-Ireland Championship in 1959. Having left school at 14, Prunty worked on the family farm until he was 20 before setting up his own agriculture business. From there he worked developing his ploughing and drainage skills and eventually established Prunty Pitches, a company that became well known for developing GAA fields using a unique sand-based drainage system.

== Honours ==
Roslea Shamrocks

- Fermanagh Senior Football Championship: 1955, 1956, 1957, 1958

Fermanagh

- All-Ireland Junior Football Championship: 1959
- Ulster Junior Football Championship: 1959
