= Barry Owens =

Fermanagh Gaelic footballer

Personal information
- Native name: Barra Ó hEoghain (Irish)
- Occupation: Electrician

Sport
- Sport: Gaelic Football
- Position: Full Back
Club
- Years: Club
- Teemore Shamrocks
Club titles
- Fermanagh titles: 1
Inter-county
- Years: County
- 2001-2014: Fermanagh
Inter-county titles
- Ulster titles: 0
- All Stars: 2

Barry Owens, is an Irish former Gaelic footballer who played for the Teemore Shamrocks club and the Fermanagh county team.

== Playing career ==
Owens has been described as "among the best full-backs in Ireland". He was an important part of Fermanagh's runs to the 2003 All-Ireland quarter-final and 2004 All-Ireland semi-final. He is a double All-Star winner, having been honoured in 2004 and 2006. Only two other Fermanagh footballers have received an All-Star award.

In January 2008, it was announced that Owens would undergo heart surgery, but he was expected to return to football within a few months.

On 21 June 2008, Fermanagh played Derry at Healy Park in the Ulster Senior Football Championship semi-final; it was then that Barry Owens made his comeback. Within minutes of coming onto the pitch as a substitute, he scored a vital goal to give Fermanagh a place in the Ulster final.

== Honours ==
Teemore Shamrocks

- Fermanagh Senior Football Championship (1): 2005

St Michael's College

- MacRory Cup (1): 1999

Individual

- All Star Award (2): 2004, 2006
