= Brian Óg Maguire =

Fermanagh Gaelic footballer (1987–2012)

Personal information
- Nickname: Ógie
- Born: 12 November 1987 Enniskillen, County Fermanagh
- Died: 13 September 2012 (aged 24) Derrylin, County Fermanagh

Sport
- Sport: Gaelic football
- Position: Left Half Forward
Club
- Years: Club
- 2004 –2012: Lisnaskea Emmetts
Inter-county
- Years: County
- 2010–2012: Fermanagh

Brian Óg Maguire (12 November 1987 – 13 September 2012) was a Gaelic footballer who played at senior level for the Fermanagh county team. From Lisnaskea, he played for Lisnaskea Emmetts.

In June 2012, he played in the half-forward line in the quarter-final of the Ulster Senior Football Championship at Brewster Park, a defeat to Down. In January 2012, he played in the Dr McKenna Cup, and also played in four matches in the National Football League.

Described as a "superstar" footballer, Maguire captained Lisnaskea Emmetts to the 2011 All-Ireland Intermediate Club Football Championship. He also played for Lisnaskea Emmetts as they reached the Fermanagh Senior Football Championship Final due to be played on 29 September 2012.

However, on 13 September 2012, Maguire was involved in an industrial accident at the Quinn Prestress factory, in the Ballyconnell Road area of Derrylin where he later died. Tributes came from all sides of the community.

His father is Brian, his mother is Eileen, and his two sisters are Roisin and Eimear.

== Honours ==
Lisnaskea Emmetts

- All-Ireland Intermediate Club Football Championship (1): 2010-11 (c)
- Ulster Intermediate Club Football Championship (1): 2010 (c)
- Fermanagh Intermediate Football Championship (1): 2010 (c)
