= Aghadrumsee St Macartan's GAC =

Gaelic Athletic Association club

Aghadrumsee St Macartan's
- Atha Droim Sí Naomh Mac Cartain
- Founded: 1954
- County: Fermanagh
- Nickname: The Magpies
- Colours: Black and White
- Grounds: St Macartan's Park, Aghadrumsee

Playing kits
Standard colours

Senior Club Championships
| | All Ireland | Ulster champions | Fermanagh champions |
|---|---|---|---|
| Football: | - | - | 1 |

Aghadrumsee St Macartan's is a Gaelic Athletic Association club based in the village of Aghadrumsee, County Fermanagh, Northern Ireland.

== History ==
The club was founded in 1954, and won the Fermanagh Senior Football Championship for the first time in 1961. It remains their only senior triumph to date.

The club's most recent success came at the junior grade, winning the championship in 2018. Aghadrumsee went one game away from reaching the final of the Ulster Junior Club Football Championship, losing to Limavady in the semi-final.

== Honours ==
- Fermanagh Senior Football Championship (1): 1961
- Fermanagh Intermediate Football Championship (2): 1985, 1990
- Fermanagh Junior Football Championship (2): 1955, 2018
