= Aghadrumsee =

Village in County Fermanagh, Northern Ireland

Coordinates: 54.2286°N 7.2728°W

Aghadrumsee: Irish: Achadh Dhruim Saileach
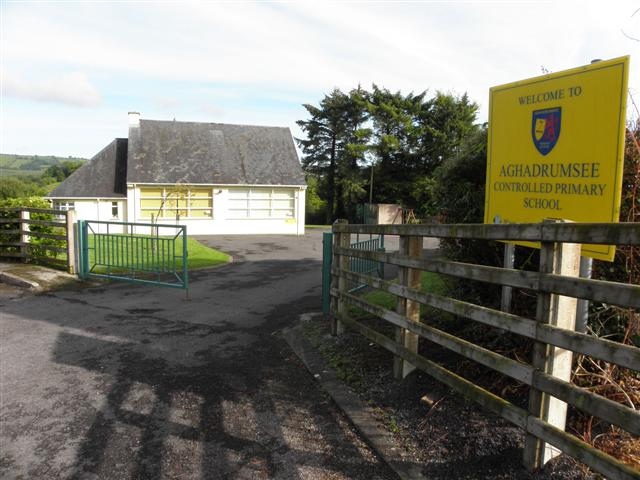
- Primary school

- Location within Northern Ireland
- Population: (2001)
- Irish grid reference: H466315
- District: Fermanagh and Omagh
- County: County Fermanagh
- Country: Northern Ireland
- Sovereign state: United Kingdom
- Post town: ENNISKILLEN
- Postcode district: BT92
- Dialling code: 028
- Police: Northern Ireland
- Fire: Northern Ireland
- Ambulance: Northern Ireland
- UK Parliament: Fermanagh and South Tyrone
- NI Assembly: Fermanagh and South Tyrone

Aghadrumsee (from Irish Achadh Dhruim Saileach 'field of the ridge of sallows') is a small village in south-eastern County Fermanagh, Northern Ireland.

Historically the town of Clones (now across the border in County Monaghan in the Republic of Ireland) has had a significant influence on this rural community due mainly to the railway which once ran through it. It is situated within Fermanagh and Omagh district.

== Etymology ==
The earliest recorded spelling of Aghadrumsee from 1609 is Aghadromsillagh. Its modern Irish translation (Achadh Dhruim Saileach) is based on this earlier name. This is derived from the Gaelic words: achadh meaning field; druim meaning ridge, and saileach meaning sallow. This now gives it the meaning of field of the ridge of sallows. The see syllable in the current spelling of Aghadrumsee is a homophone of sidhe. This gives Aghadrumsee its folklore meaning of field of the fairy hillock.

== Religion ==
Aghadrumsee comes under the Church of Ireland and Roman Catholic dioceses of Clogher. The Parish of Aghadrumsee straddles the border town of Clones (now along the border in County Monaghan in the Republic of Ireland). The community is served by a number of churches including Augher St Mark's Church of Ireland and St Macartan's Roman Catholic church. There are also churches of other denominations, including Evangelical and Presbyterian, in the area.

== Education ==
There are currently two primary schools in the local area. A Roman Catholic maintained which is in the region of Tattynageeragh, and one in Aghadrumsee.The Catholic school, St Macartens, had as of January 2021 a total of 95 pupils enrolled. All are sited in rural locations within three miles of each other and fall under the Western Education and Library Board (WELB) catchment area.

- Aghadrumsee Primary School — Controlled
- St Macartan's Primary School — Tattynageeragh (Council for Catholic Maintained Schools)

The old school in Aghadrumsee has been converted to a two-storey building attached to the Orange Hall. According to the 1826 Survey of Education, it cost £120 and was funded by the Kildare Place Society. No figures for enrolment were given as it was not yet open. The new school was built as a replacement in 1937. It was then enlarged and renovated in 1973–74 to cater to children from Magheraveely and Roslea. The school now caters for children from a wide rural area. Other schools in the local area, which are now closed, included Cornagague, Corranny, Rateen National School.Cornagague and Corranny schools closed upon their amalgamation into the newly built St Macartens school.

== Buildings of note ==
The Orange Hall at Aghadrumsee has a similar counterpart in nearby Dromaddy. There are two grocery shops (Dernawilt and Mohan's of Follom est 1882/3) in the area, as well as a single local public house nearby, Corranny Bar.

== Sport ==
The area also has a Gaelic Athletic Club called Aghadrumsee St Macartan's which incorporates both male and female players. The local Badminton team is also currently active.

== Administration ==
The area is in the political ward of Erne East and is represented by politicians from each of the four local parties, Democratic Unionist Party, Ulster Unionist Party, Sinn Féin and the Social Democratic and Labour Party.

== Notable people ==
- Arlene Foster
- Charles Irwin

== See also ==
- List of townlands in County Fermanagh
- List of villages in Northern Ireland
- List of towns in Northern Ireland
