= Newtownbutler First Fermanaghs GAA =

Fermanagh-based Gaelic games club

Newtownbutler First Fermanaghs
- An Baile Nua
- Founded: 1887
- County: Fermanagh
- Nickname: Newtown
- Colours: Red and White
- Grounds: Newtownbutler GAA Grounds, Newtownbutler

Playing kits
Standard colours

Senior Club Championships
	All Ireland	Ulster champions	Fermanagh champions
Football:	-	-	9
Hurling:	-	-	1

Newtownbutler First Fermanaghs is a Gaelic football club based in Newtownbutler, County Fermanagh, Northern Ireland. Founded in 1887, they are Fermanagh's oldest GAA club.

== History ==
The club was founded on 13 November 1887 in Reilly's Hotel, Newtownbutler. Historically, club names have varied from the Brehons, St. Aidan's, Geraldines, St. Comhghall's and then back to the famous First Fermanagh's, a name that Michael Cusack, the founder of the GAA, was said to have suggested himself.

The club's most recent senior championship success came in 2007.

== Honours ==
- Fermanagh Senior Football Championship (9): 1934, 1940, 1944, 1953, 1959, 1964, 1988, 1997, 2007
- Fermanagh Intermediate Football Championship (1): 1972
- Fermanagh Junior Football Championship (6): 1938, 1950, 1992, 1996, 2016, 2022
- Fermanagh Senior Hurling Championship (1): 1937
