= 2010–11 All-Ireland Intermediate Club Football Championship =

Irish Gaelic football competition

- Sponsor: Allied Irish Bank
- Champions: Lisnaskea Emmetts (1st title); Brian Óg Maguire (captain); Peter Clarke (manager)
- Runners-up: St James'; Mark Kelly (captain); Séamus Burke (manager)

The 2010–11 All-Ireland Intermediate Club Football Championship was the eighth staging of the All-Ireland Intermediate Club Football Championship since its establishment by the Gaelic Athletic Association for the 2003–04 season.

The All-Ireland final was played on 12 February 2011 at Croke Park in Dublin, between Lisnaskea Emmetts and St James'. Lisnaskea Emmetts won the match by 1-16 to 0-15 to claim their first ever championship title.
