= Lisnaskea Emmetts GAC =

Fermanagh-based Gaelic games club

Lisnaskea Emmets
- CLG Eiméid, Lios na Sceithe
- Founded: 1904
- County: Fermanagh
- Nickname: 'Skea
- Colours: Red and Green
- Grounds: Emmett Park
- Coordinates: 54°14′59″N 7°27′08″W

Playing kits
Standard colours

Senior Club Championships
	All Ireland	Ulster champions	Fermanagh champions
Football:	-	-	20
Hurling:	-	-	2

Lisnaskea Emmetts (also spelled Emmets) is a Gaelic Athletic Association club based in the town of Lisnaskea, County Fermanagh, Northern Ireland.

== History ==
The club is named for Robert Emmet (1778–1803), although usually spells the name as Emmett. The club was founded in 1904. It lapsed between 1920 and 1926 due to the Irish War of Independence and Partition.

Lisnaskea have won the Fermanagh Senior Football Championship on 20 occasions, with the most recent coming in 1994.

Lisnaskea defeated Irvinestown to claim the Fermanagh Intermediate title in 2010, and followed this up with wins over Tullylish and Rasharkin to reach the Ulster final. Lisnaskea faced Monaghan's Doohamlet in the Ulster Intermediate final on 11 December 2010. A 0–13 to 1–7 win made Lisnaskea the first Fermanagh club to win a provincial title. They later defeated Kildare's Ballymore Eustace on 30 January 2011 to reach the All-Ireland final. On 12 February 2011, Lisnaskea faced St James' from Galway in the All-Ireland Intermediate final at Croke Park. A Niall McElroy goal sealed a 1–16 to 0–15 victory after extra-time as Lisnaskea were crowned All-Ireland Intermediate champions. The club's ladies' football team won the All-Ireland Intermediate title later the same year.

Lisnaskea reached the Senior championship final in 2012 after defeating St Patrick's. However, on 13 September, two weeks before the final Lisnaskea captain Brian Óg Maguire was killed in an industrial accident. The final was played on 29 September but Lisnaskea lost to Tempo on an emotional day. It remains Lisnaskea's last appearance in a senior final.

== Notable players ==
- Collie Curran
- Brian Óg Maguire
- Cormac McAdam

== Current manager ==
- Sean McManus

== Current reserve manager ==
- Michael Smyth

== Honours ==
- Fermanagh Senior Football Championship (20): 1928, 1931, 1936, 1937, 1938, 1939, 1941, 1942, 1943, 1945, 1946, 1947, 1948, 1950, 1951, 1954, 1977, 1980, 1991, 1994
- All-Ireland Intermediate Club Football Championship (1): 2010–11
- Ulster Intermediate Club Football Championship (1): 2010
- Fermanagh Intermediate Football Championship (2): 2010, 2024
- Fermanagh Junior Football Championship (10): 1968, 1970, 1974, 1976, 1977, 1980, 1983, 1986, 2002, 2023
- Fermanagh Senior Hurling Championship (2): 1980, 2005
