= St Patrick's GFC, Donagh =

Gaelic football club

St Patrick's GFC
- Naomh Pádraig, Domhnach
- Founded: 1971
- County: Fermanagh
- Colours: White and Red
- Grounds: Louis Leonard Memorial Park, Donagh

Playing kits
Standard colours

Senior Club Championships
	All Ireland	Ulster champions	Fermanagh champions
Football:	-	-	1

St Patrick's GFC is a Gaelic football club based in the village of Donagh, County Fermanagh, Northern Ireland.

== History ==
The club was founded in October 1971, with the ladies' football club founded in 1993. The club reached the final of the Fermanagh Senior Football Championship for the first time in 1976, losing to Enniskillen Gaels. The club lost further finals in 1982 and 1984 to Roslea Shamrocks, and in 2002 and 2003 to Enniskillen Gaels. St Pat's finally claimed their first county title in 2008, beating Derrygonnelly Harps in the final. Donagh reached the final again in 2010 but lost to Roslea. The club's most recent championship success came in 2025, at the junior grade.

== Honours ==
- Fermanagh Senior Football Championship (1): 2008
- Fermanagh Intermediate Football Championship (2): 1992, 1999
- Fermanagh Junior Football Championship (5): 1978, 1979, 1990, 2021, 2025
