= Belnaleck Art McMurroughs GAC =

Gaelic Athletic Association club

Belnaleck Art McMurroughs
- Art Mac Murchadha, Béal na Leice
- Founded: 1902
- County: Fermanagh
- Colours: Red and White
- Grounds: Belnaleck GAA Grounds, Bellanaleck

Playing kits
Standard colours

Senior Club Championships
	All Ireland	Ulster champions	Fermanagh champions
Football:	-	-	1

Belnaleck Art McMurroughs is a Gaelic Athletic Association club based in the village of Bellanaleck, County Fermanagh, Northern Ireland.

== History ==
The club was founded in 1902, and won the Fermanagh Senior Football Championship in 1933, it remains their only senior triumph.

After winning the Junior title in 2017, Belnaleck defeated Down champions Dundrum and Doire Trasna of Derry to reach the final of the Ulster Junior Club Football Championship. Belnaleck lost the final by six points to Donegal's Naomh Colmcille.

Belnaleck completed back-to-back championship wins by defeating Irvinestown to win the Intermediate title in 2018.

== Honours ==
- Fermanagh Senior Football Championship (1): 1933
- Fermanagh Intermediate Football Championship (3): 1967, 1974, 2018
- Fermanagh Junior Football Championship (4): 1953, 1956, 2009, 2017
