= Teemore Shamrocks GFC =

Fermanagh-based Gaelic games club

Teemore Shamrocks
- Seamróga an Tí Mhóir
- Founded: 1904
- County: Fermanagh
- Colours: Green and White Hoops
- Grounds: St Mary's Park, Teemore

Playing kits
Standard colours

Senior Club Championships
	All Ireland	Ulster champions	Fermanagh champions
Football:	-	-	21

Teemore Shamrocks is a Gaelic football club based in the village of Teemore, County Fermanagh, Northern Ireland. They are the most successful club in the Fermanagh Senior Football Championship having won it 21 times.

== History ==
The club was founded in 1904 and won the inaugural Fermanagh Senior Championship that year. They have gone on to win the title twenty-one times, their last coming in 2005 after defeating Newtownbutler.

Teemore clubman Peter Quinn served as president of the Gaelic Athletic Association from 1991 to 1994.

Barry Owens became the first Teemore player to win an All Star in 2004. He was later honoured for a second time in 2006.

== Notable players ==
- Barry Owens
- Peter Quinn
- Seán Quinn

== Honours ==
- Fermanagh Senior Football Championship (21)
  - 1904, 1905, 1906, 1910, 1911, 1912, 1913, 1914, 1915, 1916, 1917, 1924, 1926, 1929, 1935, 1969, 1971, 1974, 1975, 1983, 2005
- Fermanagh Intermediate Football Championship (2)
  - 2012, 2023
- Fermanagh Junior Football Championship (1)
  - 1959
