= Devenish St Mary's GAA =

Fermanagh-based Gaelic games club

Devenish St Mary's
- Club Mhuire Daimhinis
- Founded: 1917
- County: Fermanagh
- Colours: Blue and White
- Grounds: St Mary's Park, Garrison

Playing kits
Standard colours

Senior Club Championships
	All Ireland	Ulster champions	Fermanagh champions
Football:	-	-	10

Devenish St Mary's is a Gaelic football club based in the village of Garrison, County Fermanagh, Northern Ireland.

== History ==
The club was founded in 1917, but did not affiliate until 25 July 1926. The club won the Fermanagh Senior Football Championship for the first time in 1960 as Devenish/Mulleek, and went on to win the county title four more times in the 1960s, including a three in a row from 1965 to 1967. The club's tenth and most recent championship win came in 1996.

In 2017, the club's centenary year, the club reached its first county final since 1998. Devenish lost the final by seven points to Derrygonnelly.

== Honours ==
- Fermanagh Senior Football Championship (10): 1960*, 1963, 1965, 1966, 1967, 1985, 1989, 1990, 1993, 1996
- Fermanagh Senior Football League (14): 1962, 1963, 1964, 1965, 1966, 1967, 1986, 1987, 1990, 1993, 1997, 2008, 2010, 2017
- Fermanagh Intermediate Football Championship (1): 2022
- Fermanagh Junior Football Championship (5): 1946, 1960, 1975, 1991, 2001

== Notable players ==
- Paul Coyle
