= Erne Gaels GAC =

Fermanagh-based Gaelic games club

Erne Gaels Belleek
- Gaeil Éirne Béal-Leice
- Founded: 1961
- County: Fermanagh
- Colours: Amber with Black
- Grounds: Páirc na hEirne
- Coordinates: 54°29′06″N 8°05′19″W

Playing kits
Standard colours

Senior Club Championships
	All Ireland	Ulster champions	Fermanagh champions
Football:	0	0	4
Hurling:	0	0	5

Erne Gaels, Belleek is a Gaelic Athletic Association club based in Belleek, County Fermanagh, Northern Ireland.

== History ==
The club was founded in 1961 and is named for the River Erne. Erne Gaels won their first Fermanagh Senior Football Championship title in 1979, and followed this up by winning it again in 1981.

The Belleek club's first appearance in a senior final since 1981 came in 2016, losing to Derrygonnelly Harps by a single point. After a relegation, their next championship success was in the Intermediate grade, beating Devenish in the 2021 final. In their first year back up at senior, Erne Gaels reached the county final, but suffered a heavy defeat to Enniskillen Gaels. They reached the final again in 2023, but lost once again to Derrygonnelly. The club finally won their third senior championship in 2024, beating Enniskillen Gaels in the final.

== Notable players ==
- Raymond Gallagher
- Rory Gallagher

== Honours ==
- Fermanagh Senior Football Championship (4): 1979, 1981, 2024, 2025
- Fermanagh Intermediate Football Championship (2): 2008, 2021
- Fermanagh Junior Football Championship (1): 1963
- Fermanagh Senior Hurling Championship (5): 1973, 1974, 1975, 1981, 1984
