= Donagh =

Village in County Fermanagh, Northern Ireland

Coordinates: 54.2161°N 7.3913°W

Donagh: Irish: Domhnach
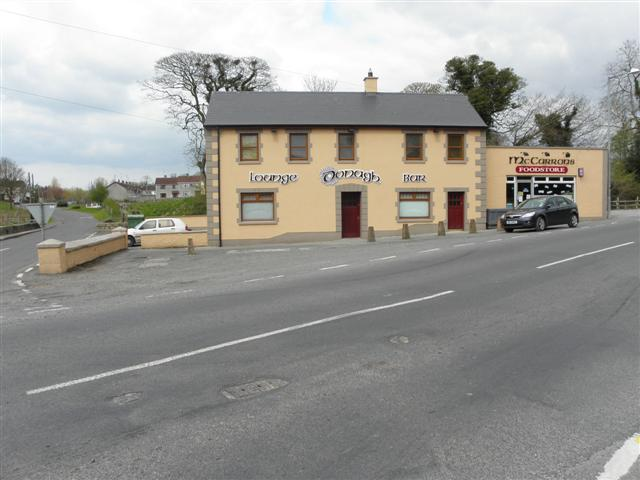
- The Donagh Bar in Donagh

- Location within Northern Ireland
- Population: 164 (2021 census)
- District: Fermanagh and Omagh
- County: County Fermanagh
- Country: Northern Ireland
- Sovereign state: United Kingdom
- Postcode district: BT
- Dialling code: 028
- UK Parliament: Fermanagh and South Tyrone
- NI Assembly: Fermanagh and South Tyrone

Donagh (pronounced /ˈdoʊnə/ DOH-nə, from Irish Domhnach, meaning 'church') is a small village and townland in County Fermanagh, Northern Ireland. It lies between Lisnaskea and Newtownbutler in the south-east of the county. The nearest town is Lisnaskea, 3 miles (5 km) to the north-west. In the 2021 census it had a population of 164. It is situated within Fermanagh and Omagh district.

There is another townland called Donagh in County Fermanagh, as well as one in County Monaghan in the Republic of Ireland.

Donagh was originally known in Irish as Ua Dúnáin Dhomhnaigh Maighe da Claoíne do Mharbhad (meaning 'O'Doonan's Church of the Plain of the Two Slopes'), later known in Irish as Domhnach Maighe Dhá Chlaoine (meaning 'Church of the Plain of the Two Slopes'). It was originally anglicised as 'Donoghmoychinny' or 'Donaghmoyline'. It was later anglicised simply as Donagh.

== Features ==
The village is home to two protected landmarks: Donagh House, which is officially listed, and an ancient religious site that includes the remains of a church and an adjoining graveyard.

St Patrick's is the local GAA club, and won the Fermanagh Senior Football Championship in 2008.
