= Fermanagh Senior Football Championship =

Irish Gaelic football league

- Current season or competition: 2026 Fermanagh Senior Football Championship
- Code: Gaelic football
- Founded: 1904
- Region: County Fermanagh, Northern Ireland (GAA)
- Trophy: New York Gold Cup
- No. of teams: 8
- Title holders: Erne Gaels (5th title)
- Most titles: Teemore Shamrocks (21 titles)
- Sponsors: Mannok
- Official website: https://fermanagh.gaa.ie/

The Fermanagh Senior Football Championship is an annual Gaelic Athletic Association club competition between the top Gaelic football clubs in Fermanagh. The winners of the Fermanagh Championship qualify to represent their county in the Ulster Senior Club Football Championship, the winners of which go on to the All-Ireland Senior Club Football Championship.

Erne Gaels are the 2026 champions.

== Winners listed by club ==
#	Team	Wins	Years won
1	Teemore Shamrocks	21	1904, 1905, 1906, 1910, 1911, 1912, 1913, 1914, 1915, 1916, 1917, 1924, 1926, 1929, 1935, 1969, 1971, 1974, 1975, 1983, 2005
2	Lisnaskea Emmetts	20	1928, 1931, 1936, 1937, 1938, 1939, 1941, 1942, 1943, 1945, 1946, 1947, 1948, 1950, 1951, 1954, 1977, 1980, 1991, 1994
3	Enniskillen Gaels	13	1930, 1976, 1978, 1987, 1992, 1998, 1999, 2000, 2001, 2002, 2003, 2006, 2022
4	Roslea Shamrocks	12	1955, 1956, 1957, 1958, 1965, 1982, 1984, 1986, 2010, 2011, 2013, 2014
5	Devenish St Mary's	10	1960, 1963, 1965, 1966, 1967, 1985, 1989, 1990, 1993, 1996
5	Derrygonnelly Harps	10	1995, 2004, 2009, 2015, 2016, 2017, 2018, 2019, 2021, 2023
7	Newtownbutler First Fermanaghs	9	1934, 1940, 1944, 1953, 1959, 1964, 1988, 1997, 2007
8	Erne Gaels Belleek	5	1979, 1981, 2024, 2025, 2026
9	Tempo Maguires	4	1970, 1972, 1973, 2012
10	Ederney St Joseph's	2	1968, 2020
10	Irvinestown St Molaise	2	1918, 1952
10	Knockninny Harps	2	1927, 1932
10	Wattlebridge Éire Óg's	2	1919, 1920
14	St Patrick's, Donagh	1	2008
14	Aghadrumsee St Macartan's	1	1961
14	Belleek Young Emmetts	1	1949
14	Belnaleck Art McMurroughs	1	1933
14	Killyrover Red Hands	1	1925

== Finals listed by year ==
Year	Winner	Score	Opponent	Score
2026	Erne Gaels Belleek	1-21	Derrygonnelly Harps	1-12
2025	Erne Gaels Belleek	1-12 (R); 2-14	Derrygonnelly Harps	1-09 (R); 0-20
2024	Erne Gaels Belleek	1-13 (R); 0-08	Enniskillen Gaels	1-09 (R); 0-08
2023	Derrygonnelly Harps	2-08	Erne Gaels Belleek	0-09
2022	Enniskillen Gaels	3-12	Erne Gaels Belleek	0-11
2021	Derrygonnelly Harps	2-08	Enniskillen Gaels	0-05
2020	Ederney St Joseph's	2-08	Derrygonnelly Harps	1-06
2019	Derrygonnelly Harps	0-10	Roslea Shamrocks	1-03
2018	Derrygonnelly Harps	2-16	Ederney St Joseph's	0-10
2017	Derrygonnelly Harps	0-15	Devenish St Mary's	0-08
2016	Derrygonnelly Harps	0-11	Erne Gaels Belleek	1-07
2015	Derrygonnelly Harps	3-16	Roslea Shamrocks	3-07
2014	Roslea Shamrocks	3-04	Teemore Shamrocks	1-05
2013	Roslea Shamrocks	1-12	Belcoo	1-09
2012	Tempo Maguires	0-15	Lisnaskea Emmetts	1-04
2011	Roslea Shamrocks	1-10	Teemore Shamrocks	1-07
2010	Roslea Shamrocks	3-04	St Patrick's Donagh	0-08
2009	Derrygonnelly Harps	3-09	Roslea Shamrocks	1-07
2008	St Patrick's Donagh	0-11	Derrygonnelly Harps	0-10
2007	Newtownbutler	2-05	Teemore Shamrocks	0-03
2006	Enniskillen Gaels	1-12	Ederney St Joseph's	0-07
2005	Teemore Shamrocks	0-11	Newtownbutler	0-09
2004	Derrygonnelly Harps	1-09	Enniskillen Gaels	0-11
2003	Enniskillen Gaels	1-08	St Patrick's Donagh	1-06
2002	Enniskillen Gaels	0-20	St Patrick's Donagh	1-06
2001	Enniskillen Gaels	1-22	Teemore Shamrocks	0-04
2000	Enniskillen Gaels	1-10	Newtownbutler	1-08
1999	Enniskillen Gaels	1-14	Teemore Shamrocks	1-03
1998	Enniskillen Gaels	0-09, 0-14 (R)	Devenish St Mary's	0-09, 1-03 (R)
1997	Newtownbutler	1-10	Tempo Maguires	0-10
1996	Devenish St Mary's	0-10	Lisnaskea Emmetts	0-08
1995	Derrygonnelly Harps	3-06	Lisnaskea Emmetts	1-10
1994	Lisnaskea Emmetts	1-09	Enniskillen Gaels	1-08
1993	Devenish St Mary's	1-15	Kinawley	2-05
1992	Enniskillen Gaels	1-07, 1-11 (R)	Lisnaskea Emmetts	1-07, 2-06 (R)
1991	Lisnaskea Emmetts	1-13	Newtownbutler	1-09
1990	Devenish St Mary's		Lisnaskea Emmetts	
1989	Devenish St Mary's	0-09	Roslea Shamrocks	0-08
1988	Newtownbutler	1-10	Belcoo	0-08
1987	Enniskillen Gaels	0-07	Roslea Shamrocks	0-05
1986	Roslea Shamrocks	0-09	Devenish St Mary's	0-05
1985	Devenish St Mary's	1-10	Belcoo	0-06
1984	Roslea Shamrocks	0-07	St Patrick's Donagh	0-02
1983	Teemore Shamrocks		Roslea Shamrocks	
1982	Roslea Shamrocks		St Patrick's Donagh	
1981	Erne Gaels Belleek		Belcoo	
1980	Lisnaskea Emmetts		Enniskillen Gaels	
1979	Erne Gaels Belleek	2-10	Teemore Shamrocks	1-10
1978	Enniskillen Gaels			
1977	Lisnaskea Emmetts	0-11	Enniskillen Gaels	0-07
1976	Enniskillen Gaels		St Patrick's Donagh	
1975	Teemore Shamrocks		Devenish St Mary's	
1974	Teemore Shamrocks		Erne Gaels Belleek	
1973	Tempo Maguires	1-12	Lisnaskea Emmetts	1-05
1972	Tempo Maguires	1-08	Teemore Shamrocks	1-06
1971	Teemore Shamrocks		Brookeborough	
1970	Tempo Maguires	2-15	Belcoo	0-04
1969	Teemore Shamrocks		Irvinestown St Molaise	
1968	Ederney St Joseph's	3-07	Newtownbutler	2-06
1967	Devenish St Mary's	3-04	Newtownbutler	0-07
1966	Devenish St Mary's	0-08	Newtownbutler	1-04
1965	Devenish St Mary's	2-05	Tempo Maguires	0-05
1964	Newtownbutler	1-08	Devenish St Mary's	2-03
1963	Devenish St Mary's	3-04	Roslea Shamrocks	1-07
1962	Roslea Shamrocks	2-09	Kinawley	0-09
1961	Aghadrumsee St Macartan's			
1960	Devenish/Mulleek	1-05	Newtownbutler	0-05
1959	Newtownbutler		Roslea Shamrocks	
1958	Roslea Shamrocks	2-06	Tempo Maguires	1-02
1957	Roslea Shamrocks	1-03	Derrygonnelly Harps	0-03
1956	Roslea Shamrocks			
1955	Roslea Shamrocks			
1954	Lisnaskea Emmetts			
1953	Newtownbutler		Irvinestown St Molaise	
1952	Irvinestown St Molaise	2-02	Roslea Shamrocks	1-01
1951	Lisnaskea Emmetts			
1950	Lisnaskea Emmetts			
1949	Belleek Young Emmetts			
1948	Lisnaskea Emmetts			
1947	Lisnaskea Emmetts			
1946	Lisnaskea Emmetts			
1945	Lisnaskea Emmetts			
1944	Newtownbutler		Derrygonnelly Harps	
1943	Lisnaskea Emmetts			
1942	Lisnaskea Emmetts		Newtownbutler	
1941	Lisnaskea Emmetts			
1940	Newtownbutler		Derrylin	
1939	Lisnaskea Emmetts		Newtownbutler	
1938	Lisnaskea Emmetts		Newtownbutler	
1937	Lisnaskea Emmetts			
1936	Lisnaskea Emmetts			
1935	Teemore Shamrocks			
1934	Newtownbutler		Irvinestown St Molaise	
1933	Belnaleck Art McMurroughs			
1932	Knockninny Harps			
1931	Lisnaskea Emmetts			
1930	Enniskillen Gaels			
1929	Teemore Shamrocks			
1928	Lisnaskea Emmetts			
1927	Knockninny Harps			
1926	Teemore Shamrocks			
1925	Killyrover Red Hands			
1924	Teemore Shamrocks			
1923	No Championship			
1922	No Championship			
1921	No Championship			
1920	Wattlebridge Éire Óg's			
1919	Wattlebridge Éire Óg's			
1918	Irvinestown St Molaise			
1917	Teemore Shamrocks			
1916	Teemore Shamrocks			
1915	Teemore Shamrocks			
1914	Teemore Shamrocks			
1913	Teemore Shamrocks			
1912	Teemore Shamrocks			
1911	Teemore Shamrocks			
1910	Teemore Shamrocks			
1909	Enniskillen O'Neill's			
1908	Enniskillen O'Neill's			
1907	Enniskillen O’Neill's			
1906	Teemore Shamrocks			
1905	Teemore Shamrocks			
1904	Teemore Shamrocks			
