= Tempo Maguires GAC =

Fermanagh-based Gaelic games club

Tempo Maguires
- An t-Iompú Mag Uidhir
- Founded: 1929
- County: Fermanagh
- Colours: Maroon and White
- Grounds: St Patrick's Park, Tempo

Playing kits
Standard colours

Senior Club Championships
	All Ireland	Ulster champions	Fermanagh champions
Football:	-	-	4

Tempo Maguires is a Gaelic Athletic Association club based in the village of Tempo, County Fermanagh, Northern Ireland.

== History ==
The club was affiliated in 1929 and won its first championship by claiming the Fermanagh Junior title in 1949. Tempo won their first Fermanagh Senior Football Championship title in 1970 and followed this up with wins in 1972 and 1973.

The Maguires won their fourth Senior championship in 2012, defeating Lisnaskea Emmetts in the final.

The club's ladies' team won the Fermanagh Intermediate title for the first time in 2020.

== Honours ==
=== Men's football ===
- Fermanagh Senior Football Championship (4): 1970, 1972, 1973, 2012
- Fermanagh Senior Football League (5): 1961, 1970, 1972, 1974, 2012
- Fermanagh Intermediate Football Championship (3): 1991, 1996, 2002
- Fermanagh Junior Football Championship (2): 1949, 1957

=== Ladies' football ===
- Fermanagh Ladies Intermediate Football Championship (1): 2020
- Fermanagh Ladies Junior Football Championship (2): 2007, 2010
