= Teemore =

Coordinates: 54.155°N 7.529°W

Teemore: Irish: An Tigh Mór
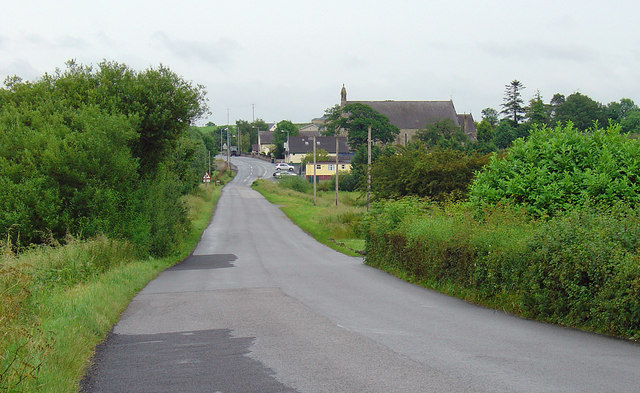
- Population: 528
- District: Fermanagh and Omagh
- County: County Fermanagh
- Country: Northern Ireland
- Sovereign state: United Kingdom
- Post town: ENNISKILLEN
- Postcode district: BT92
- Dialling code: 028
- UK Parliament: Fermanagh and South Tyrone
- NI Assembly: Fermanagh and South Tyrone

Teemore (from Irish An Tigh Mór 'the Great House') is a small village and townland in the south of County Fermanagh in Northern Ireland, three miles south of Derrylin. The Erne West F5 region, of which Teemore is the sole settlement, had a population of 528 as of the 2021 census. It is situated within the Fermanagh and Omagh District Council area.

The official opening of the Shannon-Erne Waterway took place at Corraguil Lock, near Teemore, on 23 May 1994.

== See also ==
- List of townlands in County Fermanagh
- List of villages in Northern Ireland
- List of towns in Northern Ireland

== Sources ==
- NI Neighbourhood Information System
