= Enniskillen Gaels GAC =

Fermanagh-based Gaelic games club

Enniskillen Gaels
- Gaeil Inis Ceithleann
- Founded: 1927
- County: Fermanagh
- Nickname: The Gaels
- Colours: Yellow and Blue
- Grounds: Brewster Park, Enniskillen
- Coordinates: 54°21′00″N 7°38′05″W

Playing kits
Standard colours

Senior Club Championships
	All Ireland	Ulster champions	Fermanagh champions
Football:	-	-	13
Hurling:	-	-	2

Enniskillen Gaels is a Gaelic Athletic Association club in based in Enniskillen, County Fermanagh, Northern Ireland.

== History ==
The club completed a six-in-a-row of Fermanagh titles between 1998 and 2003. Gaels reached the final of the Ulster Senior Club Football Championship twice during this period, losing to Crossmaglen Rangers in 1999 and to Errigal Ciarán in 2002. The bid for seven championships in a row was ended by Derrygonnelly Harps in the 2004 county final. That great team went on to win one further county title in 2006.

The club went into decline over the next decade, and by 2016, were on the brink of relegation to Junior football, scraping through a relegation play-off.

Backboned by the 2017 Ulster Minor winning team, the club would claim the Fermanagh Intermediate crown in 2020. In the team's first year at senior, they reached the county final. A youthful Gaels team lost by nine points to Derrygonnelly.

The Gaels reached their second consecutive final in 2022, facing Erne Gaels Belleek. Enniskillen were comfortable winners and ended a 16-year wait for the New York Cup.

== Notable players ==
- Raymond Curran
- Kieran McKenna – former underage player
- Jim Cleary

== Honours ==
=== Football ===
- Ulster Senior Club Football Championship: (0)
  - Runners Up 1999, 2002
- Fermanagh Senior Football Championship: (13)
  - 1930, 1976, 1978, 1987, 1992, 1998, 1999, 2000, 2001, 2002, 2003, 2006, 2022
- Fermanagh Intermediate Football Championship (5)
  - 1971, 1977, 1984, 2013, 2020
- Fermanagh Junior Football Championship (3)
  - 1989, 1998, 2004
- Ulster Minor Club Football Championship: (2)
  - 1988, 2017

=== Hurling ===
- Fermanagh Senior Hurling Championship: (2)
  - 1979, 1990
