= Bellanaleck =

Village in County Fermanagh, Northern Ireland

Coordinates: 54.2949°N 7.6407°W

Bellanaleck: Irish: Bealach na Leice
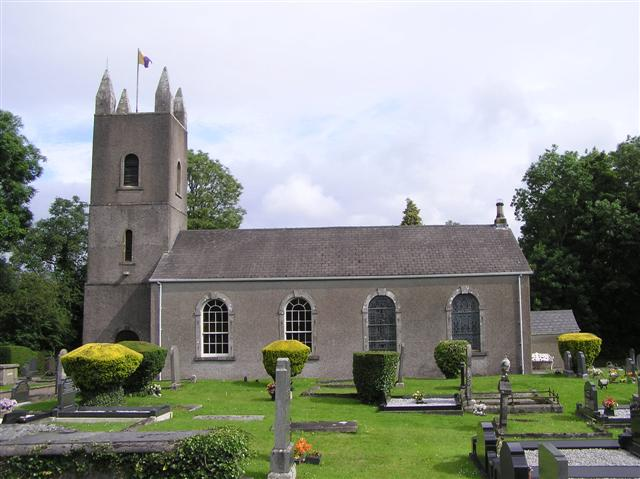
- Cleenish Church of Ireland, Bellanaleck

- Location within Northern Ireland
- Population: 714 (2021 Census)
- District: Fermanagh and Omagh
- County: County Fermanagh
- Country: Northern Ireland
- Sovereign state: United Kingdom
- Post town: ENNISKILLEN
- Postcode district: BT92
- Dialling code: 028
- UK Parliament: Fermanagh and South Tyrone
- NI Assembly: Fermanagh and South Tyrone

Bellanaleck (from Irish Bealach na Leice, meaning 'pass of the flagstone') is a small village in County Fermanagh, Northern Ireland. It lies just south of Enniskillen on the main A509 (N3) road towards Cavan and Dublin. In the 2021 census it had a population of 714. It is situated within Fermanagh and Omagh district.

== Transport ==
Bellanaleck is a stop on the Donegal-Enniskillen-Cavan-Dublin Airport-Dublin Bus Éireann Expressway route 30. There is a coach in each direction every two hours during the day as well as an overnight journey. Services operate daily including Sundays. Ulsterbus route 58 from Enniskillen to Belturbet via Kinawley also serves Bellanaleck several times a day, Mondays to Saturdays.

== Demography ==
On census day in 2011 (27 March 2011), there were 532 people living in Bellanaleck, of whom

- 58.46% belong to or were brought up in the Catholic religion and 33.83% belong to or were brought up in a 'Protestant and Other Christian (including Christian related)' religion;
- 32.52% indicated that they had a British national identity, 40.60% had an Irish national identity and 28.95% had a Northern Irish national identity*. (* Respondents could indicate more than one national identity)
- 11.53% had some knowledge of Irish;
- 2.52% had some knowledge of Ulster-Scots; and
- 3.14% did not have English as their first language.

== People ==
- Cathal McConnell, traditional flute player and singer, is from Bellanaleck. He is also a founding member of the famed international group The Boys of the Lough.
- Father Brian D'Arcy, Passionist priest and newspaper columnist, grew up in Bellanaleck.
- Mickey MacConnell, musician and writer of the song Only Our Rivers Run Free
