= Irvinestown St Molaise GFC =

Fermanagh-based Gaelic games club

St Molaise GFC, Irvinestown
- Naomh Molaise, Na Cearna
- Founded: 1906
- County: Fermanagh
- Colours: Green and Gold
- Grounds: St Molaise Park, Irvinestown

Playing kits
Standard colours

Senior Club Championships
	All Ireland	Ulster champions	Fermanagh champions
Football:	-	-	2

Irvinestown St Molaise is a Gaelic football club based in Irvinestown, County Fermanagh, Northern Ireland.

== History ==
The club was founded in 1906, and has won the Fermanagh Senior Football Championship twice. The club completed a league and championship double in 1952, going the year unbeaten.

The club's most recent success in championship came in 2015, winning the Fermanagh Intermediate title. Irvinestown reached the Intermediate final again in 2018, but lost to Belnaleck.

== Honours ==
- Fermanagh Senior Football Championship (2): 1918, 1952
- Fermanagh Intermediate Football Championship (5): 1964, 2001, 2004, 2011, 2015
- Fermanagh Junior Football Championship (2): 1982, 1987
