= Roslea Shamrocks GFC =

Fermanagh-based Gaelic games club

Roslea Shamrocks
- Seamróga Ros Liath
- Founded: 1888
- County: Fermanagh
- Colours: Green and White
- Grounds: Shamrock Park, Inver Close, Roslea
- Coordinates: 54.240593°N 7.169925°W

Playing kits
Standard colours

Senior Club Championships
	All Ireland	Ulster champions	Fermanagh champions
Football:	-	-	12

Roslea Shamrocks is a Gaelic football club based in Roslea, County Fermanagh, Northern Ireland.

== History ==
The club was founded as Roslea First Fermanaghs in 1888. They were later known as Fág a Ballagh, then became Roslea Shamrocks in 1906, the name they have kept since (except for one season, 1944, when a merger with Aghdrumsee gave them the name Dresternan Shamrocks).

Roslea Shamrocks have won twelve Fermanagh Senior Football Championships, the most recent in 2014. They reached the final of the Ulster Senior Club Football Championship in 1982.

== Notable players ==
- Peter McGinnity
- Joe Pat Prunty
- Seán Quigley

== Honours ==
- Fermanagh Senior Football Championship (12): 1955, 1956, 1957, 1958, 1965, 1982, 1984, 1986, 2010, 2011, 2013, 2014
- Fermanagh Senior Football League (9): 1980, 1981, 1982, 1983, 1984, 1985, 2009, 2011, 2014
- Fermanagh Intermediate Football Championship (2): 1973, 1998
- Fermanagh Junior Football Championship (8): 1954, 1981, 1984, 1993, 1994, 1995, 1997, 2007
