= Derrygonnelly =

Village in County Fermanagh, Northern Ireland

Coordinates: 54.401°N 7.803°W

Derrygonnelly: Irish: Doire Ó gConaíle; Scots: Derrygonlie
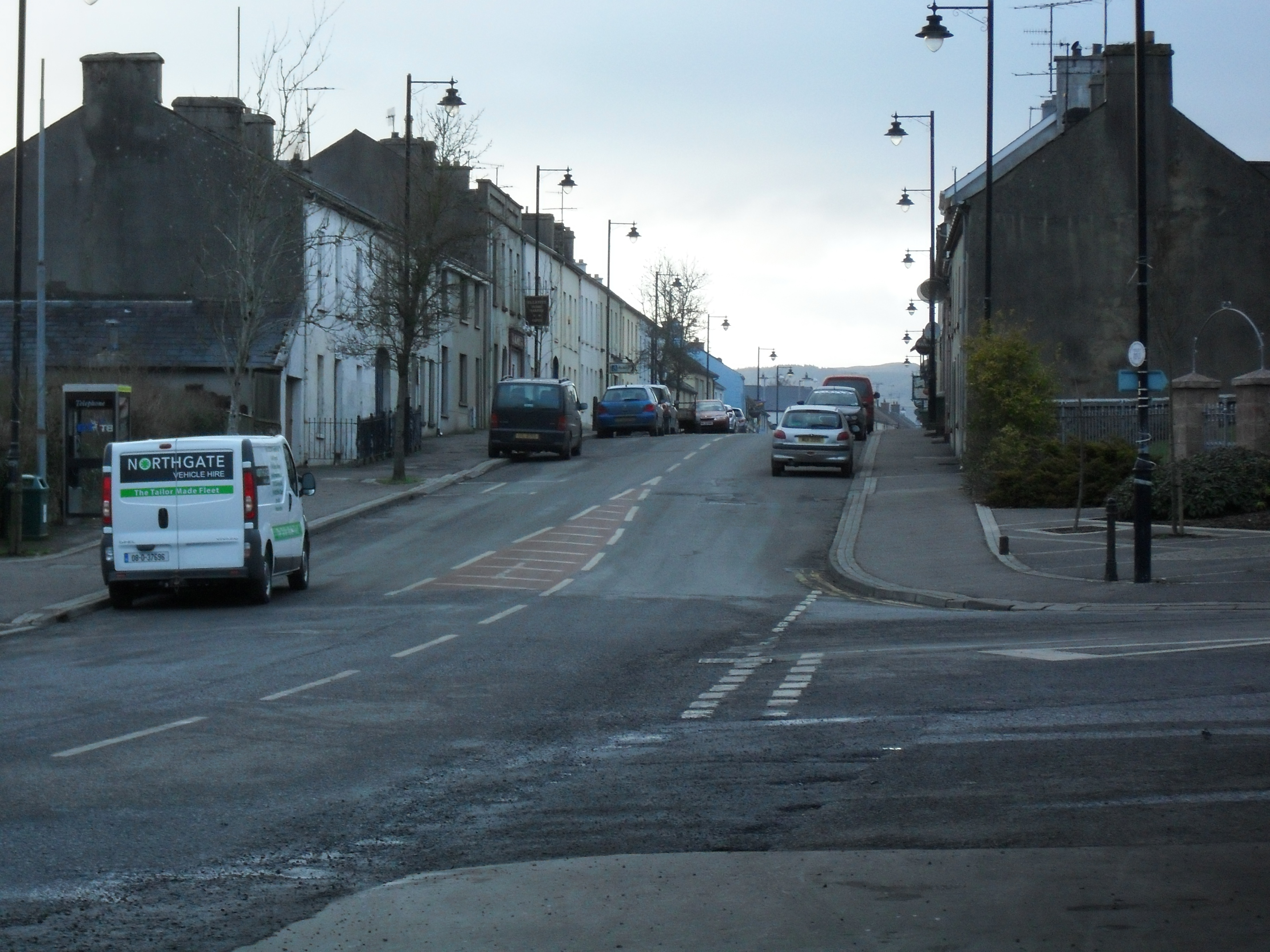
- Main Street

- Location within Northern Ireland
- Population: 574 (2021 census)
- Irish grid reference: H1215
  - Belfast: 76 mi (122 km)
  - Dublin: 97 mi (156 km)
- District: Fermanagh and Omagh
- County: County Fermanagh
- Country: Northern Ireland
- Sovereign state: United Kingdom
- Post town: ENNISKILLEN
- Postcode district: BT93
- Dialling code: 028
- UK Parliament: Fermanagh and South Tyrone
- NI Assembly: Fermanagh and South Tyrone

Derrygonnelly (from Irish Doire Ó gConaíle, meaning 'O'Connelly's oak grove') is a small village and townland in County Fermanagh, Northern Ireland. Near Lower Lough Erne, the village was home to 574 people at the 2021 census and dates to the Plantation era. It is situated within Fermanagh and Omagh district.

The village has a long history of Irish traditional music and each year in early October there is a celebration of local talent in memory of musicians Eddie Duffy and Mick Hoy. Musicians come from all over Ireland and from further afield to enjoy this festival which bases itself in any of Derrygonnelly's four pubs.

== Transport ==
Ulsterbus route 59 provides several journeys a day to/from Enniskillen via Monea and The Graan. There are no Saturday or Sunday services.

== History ==
Derrygonnelly is of ancient origin taking its name from doire or grove of the O'Connelly's it was a site of inauguration for Irish kings.

The townland of Derrygonnelly contains two Scheduled Historic Monuments: Dunbar manor plantation castle, grid ref: H11871 52475 and a 17th-century church, grid ref: H1208 5240.

== Places of interest ==
The old creamery in Derrygonnelly has been converted into a residential environmental education centre, Tir Navar, run by the Field Studies Council.

Approximately one mile to the northwest of the village are the ruins of Carrick Church; built by Gilbert O'Flanagan in 1483 "In Honour of God and Mary". The church's graveyard was used by the locals until around 1930. Also just north of the village is a small ruined church that combines medieval and Renaissance features, built in 1627 by Sir John Dunbar. His coat of arms is located over the doorway. Other 17th-century ruins in the nearby area include Monea Castle and Tully Castle, the latter having been sacked and burned by Rory Maguire on Christmas Day during the 1641 rebellion. As well as Lower Lough Erne to the north, Derrygonnelly is surrounded by small lakes and is split by the Sillees River, which is popular with canoeists.

4 miles (6.4 km) outside the village towards Garrison is Correl Glen and Lough Navar Forest Drive. The Forest Drive is a 7-mile (11 km) walk through Lough Navar Forest and has a viewpoint at the top which overlooks Lower Lough Erne, as far as the County Donegal coast to the west and the Sperrin Mountains in County Tyrone to the north and east. On the opposite side of the road lies Correl Glen, which features another walking route, with some small waterfalls near the entrance.

== Education ==
Derrygonnelly has two primary schools:

- St Patrick's Primary School
- Derrygonnelly Primary School

== GAA ==
The local Gaelic football team are the Derrygonnelly Harps (Doire Ó gConaile na Cláirsigh) who play on their home ground of Canon Maguire Park. The club was founded in 1924. The team have won nine Fermanagh Senior Championships (New York Gold Cup), one in 1995, 2004, 2009, 5 in a row from 2015-2019 and 2021. There are teams fielded at every level of men's and ladies' football.

== Demography ==
In 2011 the usually resident population of Derrygonnelly Settlement was 680, accounting for 0.04% of the NI total. Of these:

- 20.59% were aged under 16 and 13.24% were aged 65 and over
- 50.15% of the population were male and 49.85% were female
- 75.88% belong to or were brought up in the Catholic religion and 20.15% belong to or were brought up in a 'Protestant and Other Christian (including Christian related)' religion; and
- 19.85% indicated that they had a British national identity, 46.62% had an Irish national identity and 34.85% had a Northern Irish national identity.
- 5.84% of people aged 16–74 were unemployed.
