= Tempo, County Fermanagh =

Village in County Fermanagh, Northern Ireland

Coordinates: 54.379°N 7.460°W

Tempo: Irish: An tIompú Deiseal
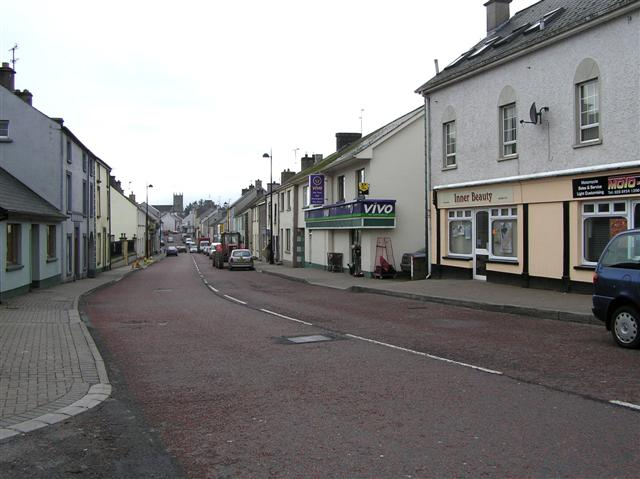

- Location within Northern Ireland
- Population: 458 (2021 Census)
- Irish grid reference: H351478
  - Belfast: 72 miles
- District: Fermanagh and Omagh
- County: County Fermanagh
- Country: Northern Ireland
- Sovereign state: United Kingdom
- Post town: 50 conergrade enniskillen
- Postcode district: BT94
- Dialling code: 02889
- UK Parliament: Fermanagh and South Tyrone
- NI Assembly: Fermanagh and South Tyrone

Tempo, historically called Tempodeshel (from Irish An tIompú Deiseal, meaning 'the right-hand turn'), is a small village at the foot of Brougher Mountain in County Fermanagh, Northern Ireland. The 2021 census recorded a population of 458 people. It lies within the Fermanagh and Omagh District Council area.

== History ==
The name An tIompú Deiseal ("the right-hand turn") may refer to a bend in the Tempo River near the village. There is a local legend that Saint Patrick left a manuscript here on his way to Enniskillen and that he told his servant to "turn right" to go back and retrieve it.

On 25 October 1920, during the Irish War of Independence, the Irish Republican Army (IRA) raided the Royal Irish Constabulary barracks in Tempo for weapons. RIC sergeant Samuel Lucas was shot and fatally wounded, but a group of armed Ulster Volunteers arrived and drove off the IRA unit. Shortly after, a Catholic civilian with republican sympathies, Philip Breen, was shot in the doorway of his family's pub in the village and later died of his wounds.

Tempo is the birthplace of Young Irelander Terence MacManus, one of the leaders of the 1848 Rebellion.

== Education ==
Schools and pre-schools serving the area include Tempo Controlled Primary School, St. Mary's Primary School and the Tempo Community Playgroup.

== Places of interest ==
Tempo Manor is a Victorian Manor House, built in 1863 and standing in 300 acres (1.2 km^{2}) of grounds and woodlands.

Campbell's Bar is the oldest public house in the town and is known for its reported supernatural sightings. The Fermanagh News reported the bar as the most haunted place in Fermanagh in 1994.

== 2001 Census ==
Tempo is classified as a small village or hamlet by the NI Statistics and Research Agency (NISRA) (i.e. with population between 500 and 1,000 people). At the 2001 census there were 533 people living in Tempo. Of these:

- 23.2% were aged under 16 years and 21.5% were aged 60 and over
- 48.2% of the population were male and 51.8% were female
- 69.0% were from a Catholic background and 30.4% were from a Protestant background
- 5.7% of people aged 16–74 were unemployed

For more details see: NI Neighbourhood Information Service

== See also ==
- List of towns and villages in Northern Ireland

== Sources ==
- Enniskillen.com
- Culture Northern Ireland
