= Derrygonnelly Harps GFC =

Fermanagh-based Gaelic games club

- Doire Ó gConaile na Cláirsigh
- Founded: 1924
- County: Fermanagh
- Nickname: Harps
- Colours: Purple and Yellow
- Grounds: Canon Maguire Park
- Coordinates: 54°25′19″N 7°49′40″W

Playing kits
Standard colours

Senior Club Championships
	All Ireland	Ulster champions	Fermanagh champions
Football:	0	0	10

Derrygonnelly Harps is a Gaelic football club from Derrygonnelly in County Fermanagh, Northern Ireland, founded in 1924. The club participates in Fermanagh competitions and has won the Fermanagh Senior Football Championship nine times. The club colours are purple and yellow.

The name Derrygonnelly (Doire Ó gConaile), when translated, means the "Oak Wood of O'Connolly". The Harps' playing complex is about half a mile outside Derrygonnelly village. The grounds, known as Canon Maguire Park, comprises the main playing field, a full size training pitch, a changing room complex, a meeting room and a covered stand. The stand, the first covered stand in Fermanagh, was opened in 1999.

The club draws its players from the parish of Botha, taking in the areas of Boho, Monea and Derrygonnelly itself.

== History ==
The club was founded in 1924. It fielded its first Minor team in 1937. There followed a lapse, and the club was to reform once again in 1948.

The Harps were competing at the senior grade from 1953, and became league champions at this grade in 1959 when they defeated Aghadrumsee on a scoreline of 2-5 to 1-4.

Successes in later decades included Intermediate Championship wins in 1963 and 1970, and a Junior League title in 1976. By this stage, Boho St Fabers GFC, Junior Championship winners themselves in 1965, had amalgamated with the Harps.

In the 1990s, the club won Senior and Junior Division 2 titles in 1992. In 1995, the club won the Fermanagh Senior Football Championship for the first time. The Harps lost League Division One Finals in 1995 and 1997 before claiming the championship title again in 2004 and 2009.

In 2015, the club won the Senior League and Championship Winners double, repeat double as 2016 Senior League and Championship Winners, and were 2017 Senior League Champions.

== Grounds ==
The club purchased Sandhill Fields, later named as Canon Maguire Park, in 1958. The new pitch was officially opened on 13 May 1962. The pitch was redeveloped as a Prunty Pitch in 1985. The main dressing room complex was opened in 1987. Intervening years saw the addition of ball stops, a scoreboard, the spectator stand and, in 2002, a new training field. In 2010, the reconstructed Canon Maguire Park main pitch was reopened with new pathway and fencing. In 2012, a new two storey complex and refurbished changing rooms opened.

== Honours ==
- Fermanagh Senior Football Championship (10): 1995, 2004, 2009, 2015, 2016, 2017, 2018, 2019, 2021, 2023
- Fermanagh Intermediate Football Championship (2): 1963, 1970
- Fermanagh Junior Football Championship (5): 1942, 1952, 2003, 2005, 2012

== See also ==
- List of Gaelic games clubs in Ireland
