= Brewster Park (Enniskillen) =

GAA stadium in Enniskillen, Northern Ireland

- Páirc an Bruiscear
- Location within Northern Ireland
- Address: Enniskillen, County Fermanagh, BT74 6NN
- Location: Northern Ireland
- Coordinates: 54°21′4″N 7°38′2″W
- Owner: Fermanagh GAA
- Capacity: 18,000
- Field size: 145 x 83 m
- Public transit: Enniskillen Ulsterbus depot

Construction
- Renovated: 2007

Brewster Park is a GAA stadium in Enniskillen, County Fermanagh, Northern Ireland. It is the home ground of the Enniskillen Gaels and the County ground of Fermanagh GAA. The ground was renovated in 2007 and now has a capacity of roughly 18,000. The ground was named for Mickey Brewster, a Fermanagh and Enniskillen Gaels player and father of Paul Brewster.

In the first match played in Brewster Park since the renovations, Fermanagh defeated Monaghan in the first round of the Ulster Senior Football Championship on Sunday, May 26, 2008 by a score of 2–8 to 0–10. Lorcan McCaughey being the star of the game scoring 1-6 for Fermanagh.

Floodlights were installed in the ground in 2008 and were used in the 2008 Ulster Senior Club Football Championship final between Ballinderry and Crossmaglen. They were officially unveiled in January 2009 in a Dr. McKenna Cup game between Fermanagh and University of Ulster, Jordanstown (UUJ).

== See also ==
- List of Gaelic Athletic Association stadiums
- List of stadiums in Ireland by capacity
