= Fermanagh GAA =

Gaelic games governing body

- Irish: Fear Manach
- Nickname(s): The Ernesiders
- Province: Ulster
- Dominant sport: Gaelic football
- Ground(s): Brewster Park, Enniskillen
- County colours: Green White

County teams
- NFL: Division 3
- NHL: Division 3A
- Football Championship: Tailteann Cup
- Hurling Championship: Nicky Rackard Cup
- Ladies' Gaelic football: Brendan Martin Cup

The Fermanagh County Board of the Gaelic Athletic Association (GAA) (Irish: Cumann Lúthchleas Gael, Coiste Chontae Fear Manach) or Fermanagh GAA is one of the 32 county boards of the GAA in Ireland and is responsible for the administration of Gaelic games in County Fermanagh, Northern Ireland.

The county football team reached an All-Ireland Senior Football Championship semi-final replay in 2004, its best performance in the competition.

In 2026 there are 23 affiliated GAA clubs of which 15 participate in football, 3 in hurling and 5 clubs in both. This is among the lowest number of clubs in all of Ireland.

== Football ==
=== Clubs ===
Clubs contest the Fermanagh Senior Football Championship.

Lisnaskea's win against St James' in the 2010–11 All-Ireland Intermediate Club Football Championship final meant it was the first Fermanagh GAA club to win an All-Ireland title.

Fermanagh football clubs

Club	As Gaelige	Colours	Dathanna
Aghadrumsee	Átha Droim Sí	Black and White	Dubh agus Bán
Belcoo	Béal Cú	Light Blue and Navy	Gorm agus Cabhlach
Belnaleck	Béal na Leice	Red and White	Dearg agus Bán
Brookeborough	Achadh Lun	Red and Black	Dearg agus Dubh
Coa	An Cuach	Black and Gold	Dubh agus Ór
Derrygonnelly	Doire Ó gConaile	Purple and Yellow	Corcra agus Buí
Derrylin	Doire Ó Loinn	Green, White and Gold	Glas, Bán agus
Devenish	Daibhinis	Blue and White	Gorm agus Bán
Ederney	Eadarnaigh	White and Green	Bán agus Glas
Enniskillen Gaels	Inis Ceithleann	Blue and Yellow	Gorm agus Buí
Erne Gaels	Gaeil na hÉirne	Yellow and Black	Buí agus Dubh
Irvinestown	Na Cearna	Green and Gold	Glas agus Ór
Kinawley	Cill Naile	Blue and White	Gorm agus Bán
Lisnaskea	Lios na Scéithe	Red and Green	Dearg agus Glas
Maguiresbridge	Droichead Mhic Uidhir	Red and Black	Dearg agus Dubh
Newtownbutler	An Baile Nua	Red and White	Dearg agus Bán
Roslea Shamrocks	Seamróga Rosliath	Green and White	Glas agus Bán
St Patrick's (Donagh)	Naomh Pádraig	White and Red	Bán agus Dearg
Teemore	An Tigh Mór	Green and White	Glas agus Bán
Tempo	An tIompú	Maroon and White	Marún agus Bán

=== County team ===
The county team has never won an Ulster Senior Football Championship (SFC) but has contested the final on six occasions: 1914, 1935, 1945, 1982, 2008 and 2018. Fermanagh is the only team in its province to have never won an Ulster SFC.

In Charlie Mulgrew's first season in charge, the county team reached the 2003 All-Ireland Senior Football Championship quarter-final after beating Meath and Mayo in the qualifiers. The team went to a replayed 2004 All-Ireland Senior Football Championship semi-final, beating Meath, Cork and Donegal and most memorably of all Armagh, thanks to a late point by Tom Brewster, before losing to Mayo.

== Hurling ==
Clubs contested the Fermanagh Senior Hurling Championship.

However, the competition has not been contested since 2013, with Fermanagh better known for providing the sport with the father of Seán Óg Ó hAilpín and featuring in a Mícheál Ó Muircheartaigh quote about Ó hAilpín, as not being "a hurling stronghold". Only Lisbellaw enter the championship and represent Fermanagh in the Ulster Intermediate championship.

Clubs typically compete in leagues of neigbouring counties like Tyrone, Amagh or across Ulster or only compete in juvenile competitions.

Fermanagh hurling clubs

Club	As Gaelige	Colours	Dathanna	Comments
Lisbellaw	Lios Béal Átha	Green and White	Glas agus Bán	
Erne Gaels	Gaeil na hÉirne	Yellow and Black	Buí agus Dubh	
Belnaleck	Béal na Leice	Red and White	Dearg agus Bán	
Knocks Grattans	Na Cnoic	Orange and White	Oráiste agus Bán	
Enniskillen Gaels	Inis Ceithleann	Blue and Yellow	Gorm agus Buí	
Lisnaskea	Lios na Scéithe	Red and Green	Dearg agus Glas	
Ederney	Eadarnaigh	White and Green	Bán agus Glas	
Belcoo	Béal Cú	Light Blue and Navy	Gorm agus Cabhlach	Form the MacNean Hurling Club together with Shannon Gaels from Cavan
Naomh Aodhan		Black and Yellow		

Joe Baldwin managed Fermanagh for six years until May 2025, including to the 2024 Lory Meagher Cup. After criticising his own players, Baldwin announced he had "temporarily stepped aside" to allow selectors Conor Tinnelly and Seamus Breslin take charge of the 2025 Nicky Rackard Cup's last two games; Baldwin later stated he knew he had "lost the changing room", but preferred to wait until the campaign had concluded so that his departure would not distract the players.

Fermanagh has the following achievements in hurling.

=== All-Irelands (4) ===
- All-Ireland Senior Hurling Championship: 0
- All-Ireland Junior Hurling Championship/Nicky Rackard Cup: 1
  - Champions (1): 1994
  - Runners-Up (1): 1977
- All-Ireland Junior B Hurling Championship/Lory Meagher Cups: 3
  - Champions (3): 2015, 2021, 2024
  - Runners-Up (3): 2012, 2014, 2020
- All-Ireland Minor C Championships: 1
  - 2009

=== Provincials (1) ===
- Ulster Senior Hurling Championship: 0
- Ulster Junior Hurling Championships: 1
  - 1994

=== Leagues (3) ===
- National Hurling League Division 4: 1
  - 1995
- National Hurling League Division 3 Shield: 1
  - 2007
- National Hurling Division 3B: 1
  - 2022

== Ladies' football ==
Fermanagh has a ladies' football team. They currently play in the All-Ireland Intermediate Ladies' Football Championship. They became runners-up in 2009 and 2014.

== Camogie ==
Having been established in the 1920s, Camogie was revived in Fermanagh by Father Tom Maguire in 1939 around a base in Newtownbutler and they contested Ulster senior championship finals in the 1940s. Enniskillen contested the Féile na nGael camogie first division final in 1977 and Teemore won divisional honours in 1993, 1994 and 1995.

Under Camogie's National Development Plan 2010-2015, "Our Game, Our Passion", three new camogie clubs were to be established in Fermanagh and a county board formed by 2015.

According to the Fermanagh GAA strategic plan 2026-2030 from 2026, "Camogie does not currently operate within Fermanagh".
