= Ulster Senior Club Football Championship =

Gaelic football competition

- Current season or competition: 2026 Ulster Senior Club Football Championship
- Irish: Craobh Shinsear Peile Ulaidh na gClub
- Code: Gaelic football
- Founded: 1968; 58 years ago
- Region: Ulster (GAA)
- Trophy: Seamus McFerran Cup
- No. of teams: 9
- Title holders: Scotstown (5th title)
- Most titles: Crossmaglen Rangers (11 titles)
- Sponsors: AIB
- TV partner: TG4

The Ulster Senior Club Football Championship, known as the Ulster Club SFC for short, is an annual Gaelic football tournament organised by Ulster GAA. It is played between the Senior championship winners from each of the nine counties of Ulster. The competition was first held in 1968 and has a straight knock-out format. The winners are awarded the Seamus McFerran Cup (Irish: Corn Shéamuis Mhic Fearáin). The winners go on to represent Ulster in the All-Ireland Senior Club Football Championship.

Derry clubs have won the competition seventeen times, more than any other county. Crossmaglen Rangers are the most successful club, having won the competition eleven times. The current champions are Scotstown from Monaghan, having beaten Kilcoo in the 2025 final.

== Competition format ==
Each of the nine counties of Ulster organise a county championship annually for their top clubs. The nine county champions compete in the Ulster Senior Club Football Championship in a knock-out format.

== List of finals ==
Key to list of winners
†	Winning team reached the final of the All-Ireland Senior Club Football Championship
‡	Winning team won the All-Ireland Senior Club Football Championship

List of Ulster Senior Club Football Championship finals
Year	Winners		Score	Runners-up		Venue	Ref
Year	County	Club	Score	County	Club	Venue	Ref
1968	Derry	Bellaghy	0–08 – 0–05	Donegal	St Joseph's	O'Neill Park, Dungannon	
1969	Down	Bryansford	1–10 – 1–09	Cavan	Crosserlough	Casement Park, Belfast	
1970	Down	Bryansford †	0–06 – 0–03	Derry	Newbridge	Casement Park, Belfast	
1971	Derry	Bellaghy ‡	1–11 – 0–05	Armagh	Clan na Gael	O'Neill Park, Dungannon	
1972	Armagh	Clan na Gael	0–08 – 1–03	Tyrone	Ardboe	St Mary's Park, Castleblayney	
1973	Armagh	Clan na Gael †	1–11 – 0–03	Donegal	St Joseph's	St Molaise Park, Irvinestown	
1974	Armagh	Clan na Gael	1–07 – 1–04	Tyrone	Trillick	Healy Park, Omagh	
1975	Donegal	St Joseph's	3–06 – 1–08	Monaghan	Castleblayney Faughs	Healy Park, Omagh	
1976	Derry	Ballerin †	2–08 – 2–03	Armagh	Clan na Gael	Healy Park, Omagh	
1977	Antrim	St John's †	2–10 – 2–02	Cavan	Cavan Gaels	St Mary's Park, Castleblayney	
1978	Monaghan	Scotstown †	1–08 – 1–04	Antrim	St John's	O'Neill Park, Dungannon	
1979	Monaghan	Scotstown	0–09 – 0–08	Armagh	Carrickcruppen	Fr Peter Campbell Park, Coalisland	
1980	Monaghan	Scotstown	1–04 – 1–03	Antrim	St John's	Athletic Grounds, Armagh	
1981	Derry	Ballinderry	2–03 – 0–05	Down	Burren	Davitt Park, Lurgan	
1982	Antrim	St Gall's	0–15 – 2–05	Fermanagh	Roslea Shamrocks	Fr Peter Campbell Park, Coalisland	
1983	Down	Burren	1–04 – 0–05	Antrim	St Gall's	Davitt Park, Lurgan	
1984	Down	Burren	0–10 – 2–02	Antrim	St John's	Athletic Grounds, Armagh	
1985	Down	Burren ‡	0–06 – 1–02	Monaghan	Scotstown	Athletic Grounds, Armagh	
1986	Monaghan	Castleblayney Faughs	0–04 – 0–03	Down	Burren	Athletic Grounds, Armagh	
1987	Down	Burren ‡	0–08 – 0–06	Cavan	Kingscourt Stars	Pearse Park, Ballybay	
1988	Down	Burren	0–08 – 0–03	Armagh	Pearse Óg	Pearse Park, Ballybay	
1989	Monaghan	Scotstown	2–09 – 0–05	Tyrone	Coalisland	Athletic Grounds, Armagh	
1990	Derry	Lavey ‡	2–10 – 0–04	Cavan	Kingscourt Stars	Athletic Grounds, Armagh	
1991	Monaghan	Castleblayney Faughs	0–08 – 0–06	Donegal	Killybegs	Healy Park, Omagh	
1992	Derry	Lavey	0–10 – 0–10	Down	Burren	Athletic Grounds, Armagh	
1992	Derry	Lavey	0–11 – 1–05 (R)	Down	Burren	Athletic Grounds, Armagh	
1993	Tyrone	Errigal Ciarán	3–07 – 1–08	Down	Russell Gaelic Union, Downpatrick	Athletic Grounds, Armagh	
1994	Derry	Bellaghy †	0–11 – 0–10	Monaghan	Clontibret O'Neills	Athletic Grounds, Armagh	
1995	Armagh	Mullaghbawn	1–11 – 2–05	Cavan	Bailieborough Shamrocks	St Tiernach's Park, Clones	
1996	Armagh	Crossmaglen Rangers ‡	1–07 – 1–07	Derry	Bellaghy	St Tiernach's Park, Clones	
1996	Armagh	Crossmaglen Rangers ‡	2–05 – 0–08 (R)	Derry	Bellaghy	St Tiernach's Park, Clones	
1997	Derry	Dungiven	0–14 – 1–08	Tyrone	Errigal Ciarán	St Tiernach's Park, Clones	
1998	Armagh	Crossmaglen Rangers ‡	1–11 – 1–10	Derry	Bellaghy	St Tiernach's Park, Clones	
1999	Armagh	Crossmaglen Rangers ‡	0–10 – 0–09	Fermanagh	Enniskillen Gaels	St Tiernach's Park, Clones	
2000	Derry	Bellaghy	1–10 – 1–04	Tyrone	Errigal Ciarán	St Tiernach's Park, Clones	
2001	Derry	Ballinderry ‡	1–10 – 1–07	Down	Mayobridge	Casement Park, Belfast	
2002	Tyrone	Errigal Ciarán	0–08 – 1–03	Fermanagh	Enniskillen Gaels	St Tiernach's Park, Clones	
2003	Derry	Loup	0–11 – 1–05	Antrim	St Gall's	St Tiernach's Park, Clones	
2004	Armagh	Crossmaglen Rangers	0–14 – 0–09	Down	Mayobridge	Casement Park, Belfast	
2005	Antrim	St Gall's †	1–08 – 0–08	Derry	Bellaghy	Healy Park, Omagh	
2006	Armagh	Crossmaglen Rangers ‡	0–05 – 0–02	Derry	Ballinderry	Casement Park, Belfast	
2007	Armagh	Crossmaglen Rangers	1–09 – 1–06	Antrim	St Gall's	Páirc Esler, Newry	
2008	Armagh	Crossmaglen Rangers	1–10 – 1–10	Derry	Ballinderry	Brewster Park, Enniskillen	
2008	Armagh	Crossmaglen Rangers	0–12 – 1–04 (R)	Derry	Ballinderry	Brewster Park, Enniskillen	
2009	Antrim	St Gall's ‡	0–16 – 0–05	Derry	Loup	Páirc Esler, Newry	
2010	Armagh	Crossmaglen Rangers ‡	2–09 – 0–10	Donegal	Naomh Conaill	Breffni Park, Cavan	
2011	Armagh	Crossmaglen Rangers ‡	2–11 – 0–10	Down	Burren	Athletic Grounds, Armagh	
2012	Armagh	Crossmaglen Rangers	3–09 – 1–09	Down	Kilcoo	Athletic Grounds, Armagh	
2013	Derry	Ballinderry	1–13 – 2–06	Donegal	Glenswilly	Healy Park, Omagh	
2014	Derry	Slaughtneil †	1–10 – 1–09	Tyrone	Omagh St Enda's	Athletic Grounds, Armagh	
2015	Armagh	Crossmaglen Rangers	2–17 – 2–12 (aet)	Monaghan	Scotstown	Athletic Grounds, Armagh	
2016	Derry	Slaughtneil †	0–12 – 0–09	Down	Kilcoo	Athletic Grounds, Armagh	
2017	Derry	Slaughtneil	1–15 – 0–10	Cavan	Cavan Gaels	Athletic Grounds, Armagh	
2018	Donegal	Gaoth Dobhair	0–13 – 0–12 (aet)	Monaghan	Scotstown	Healy Park, Omagh	
2019	Down	Kilcoo †	2–11 – 2–09	Donegal	Naomh Conaill	Healy Park, Omagh	
2020	Competition cancelled due to COVID-19 pandemic						
2021	Down	Kilcoo ‡	3–10 – 0–03	Fermanagh	Derrygonnelly Harps	Athletic Grounds, Armagh	
2022	Derry	Glen †	1–12 – 1–6	Down	Kilcoo	Athletic Grounds, Armagh	
2023	Derry	Glen ‡	0–13 – 0–11	Monaghan	Scotstown	Athletic Grounds, Armagh	
2024	Tyrone	Errigal Ciarán †	1–08 – 0–10	Down	Kilcoo	Athletic Grounds, Armagh	
2025	Monaghan	Scotstown	0–19 – 0–16 (aet)	Down	Kilcoo	Athletic Grounds, Armagh	

== Performances ==
=== By county ===
Performances in the Ulster Senior Club Football Championship by county
County	Titles	Runners-up	Years won	Years runners-up
Derry	17	7	1968, 1971, 1976, 1981, 1990, 1992, 1994, 1997, 2000, 2001, 2003, 2013, 2014, 2016, 2017, 2022, 2023	1970, 1996, 1998, 2005, 2006, 2008, 2009
Armagh	15	4	1972, 1973, 1974, 1995, 1996, 1998, 1999, 2004, 2006, 2007, 2008, 2010, 2011, 2012, 2015	1971, 1976, 1979, 1988
Down	9	12	1969, 1970, 1983, 1984, 1985, 1987, 1988, 2019, 2021	1981, 1986, 1992, 1993, 2001, 2004, 2011, 2012, 2016, 2022, 2024, 2025
Monaghan	7	6	1978, 1979, 1980, 1986, 1989, 1991, 2025	1975, 1985, 1994, 2015, 2018, 2023
Antrim	4	6	1977, 1982, 2005, 2009	1978, 1980, 1983, 1984, 2003, 2007
Tyrone	3	6	1993, 2002, 2024	1972, 1974, 1989, 1997, 2000, 2014
Donegal	2	6	1975, 2018	1968, 1973, 1991, 2010, 2013, 2019
Cavan	0	6	—	1969, 1977, 1987, 1990, 1995, 2017
Fermanagh	0	4	—	1982, 1999, 2002, 2021

=== By club ===
Performances in the Ulster Senior Club Football Championship by club
Club	Titles	Runners-up	Years won	Years runners-up
Crossmaglen Rangers	11	0	1996, 1998, 1999, 2004, 2006, 2007, 2008, 2010, 2011, 2012, 2015	—
Burren	5	4	1983, 1984, 1985, 1987, 1988	1981, 1986, 1992, 2011
Scotstown	5	4	1978, 1979, 1980, 1989, 2025	1985, 2015, 2018, 2023
Bellaghy	4	3	1968, 1971, 1994, 2000	1996, 1998, 2005
St Gall's	3	3	1982, 2005, 2009	1983, 2003, 2007
Clan na Gael	3	2	1972, 1973, 1974	1971, 1976
Ballinderry	3	2	1981, 2001, 2013	2006, 2008
Errigal Ciarán	3	2	1993, 2002, 2024	1997, 2000
Slaughtneil	3	0	2014, 2016, 2017	—
Kilcoo	2	5	2019, 2021	2012, 2016, 2022, 2024, 2025
Castleblayney Faughs	2	1	1986, 1991	1975
Bryansford	2	0	1969, 1970	—
Lavey	2	0	1990, 1992	—
Glen	2	0	2022, 2023	—
St John's	1	3	1977	1978, 1980, 1984
St Joseph's	1	2	1975	1968, 1973
Loup	1	1	2003	2009
Ballerin	1	0	1976	—
Mullaghbawn	1	0	1995	—
Dungiven	1	0	1997	—
Gaoth Dobhair	1	0	2018	—
Cavan Gaels	0	2	—	1977, 2017
Kingscourt Stars	0	2	—	1987, 1990
Enniskillen Gaels	0	2	—	1999, 2002
Mayobridge	0	2	—	2001, 2004
Naomh Conaill	0	2	—	2010, 2019
Crosserlough	0	1	—	1969
Newbridge	0	1	—	1970
Ardboe	0	1	—	1972
Trillick	0	1	—	1974
Carrickcruppen	0	1	—	1979
Roslea Shamrocks	0	1	—	1982
Pearse Óg	0	1	—	1988
Coalisland	0	1	—	1989
Killybegs	0	1	—	1991
Russell Gaelic Union, Downpatrick	0	1	—	1993
Clontibret O'Neills	0	1	—	1994
Bailieborough Shamrocks	0	1	—	1995
Glenswilly	0	1	—	2013
Omagh St Enda's	0	1	—	2014
Derrygonnelly Harps	0	1	—	2021

== See also ==
- Ulster Senior Club Football League
- Ulster Senior Club Hurling Championship
