= 2026 Antrim Senior Football Championship =

Irish football tournament

124th Antrim Senior Football Championship

Tournament details
- County: Antrim
- Province: Ulster
- Year: 2026
- Sponsor: Northern Switchgear
- Date: 8 August - 18 October 2026
- Teams: 16
- Defending champions: Dunloy

Winners
- Champions: St Brigid's (1st win)
- Manager: Cathal Murray

Runners-up
- Runners-up: O'Donovan Rossa
- Manager: Seán Fleming
- Captain: Gavin McGrath

Promotion/Relegation
- Relegated team(s): Tir-na-nÓg; Patrick Sarsfields

Other
- Matches played: 33
- Website: Antrim GAA

The 2026 Antrim Senior Football Championship is the 124th edition of Antrim GAA's premier club Gaelic football tournament for senior clubs in County Antrim, Northern Ireland. 16 teams compete, with the winner representing Antrim in the Ulster Senior Club Football Championship. The championship starts with a group-stage and progresses to a knock-out stage.

Dunloy are the defending champions after winning their first Antrim S.F.C title in 89 years against Erin's Own, Cargin.

St Ergnat's and Patrick Sarsfields returned to the senior grade after winning the 2025 I.F.C and the I.F.L respectively.

St Mary's Ahogill and St Jame's were relegated after finishing last in the 2025 S.F.L and losing the relegation play-off respectively.

The draw for the group stage of the championship was made on the 19 May 2026 and the fixtures for those group stage games were released on 6 July 2026.

== Championship Structure ==
The championship starts with a group-stage, where the 1st and 2nd placed teams in each group qualify for the quarter-finals. 1st placed teams will play against 2nd placed teams with no repeat pairings. The winners of the quarter-finals play in the semi-finals where the winners of the semi-finals go on to play in the final.

The bottom placed teams from each group progress to a relegation group. The bottom placed team in the relegation group is relegated to the 2027 Antrim I.F.C.

The teams relegated from the 2026 Antrim S.F.L have to qualify for the knock-out stage or else they will both be relegated. If both teams do not qualify there will be no relegation play-off.

== Team Changes ==
The following teams have changed division since the 2025 championship season:

=== To S.F.C. ===
Promoted from 2025 Intermediate Football Championship

- St Ergnat's - (Intermediate Champions)
- Patrick Sarsfields - (I.F.L Champions)

=== From S.F.C. ===
Relegated to 2026 Intermediate Football Championship

- St Jame's
- St Marys Ahoghill (Relegated from S.F.L)

== Participating teams ==
The teams who are competing in the 2026 Antrim S.F.C are:

Club	Location	2025 Championship Position	2026 Championship Position	Championship Titles (Pre 2026)	Last Championship Title (Pre 2026)
All Saints	Ballymena	Relegation Play-off	Non-Qualifier	0	—
Con Magee's	Glenravel	Non-Qualifier	Non-Qualifier	1	1966
Creggan Kickhams	Randalstown	Semi-Finalist	Quarter-Finalist	3	2021
Dunloy	Dunloy	Champions	Semi-Finalist	7	2025
Erin's Own, Cargin	Toome	Runners-Up	Semi-Finalist	13	2024
Lámh Dhearg	Belfast	Non-Qualifier	Quarter-Finalist	3	2017
O'Donovan Rossa	Belfast	Quarter-Finalist	Runners-Up	16	1991
Patrick Sarsfields	Belfast	I.F.L Champions	Relegated to Intermediate	4	1985
Roger Casement's	Portglenone	Semi-Finalist	Quarter-Finalist	0	—
St Brigid's	Belfast	Quarter-Finalist	Champions	0	—
St Ergnat's	Moneyglass	I.F.C Champions	Relegation Play-off	0	—
St Gall's	Belfast	Quarter-Finalist	Non-Qualifier	19	2014
St John's	Belfast	Non-Qualifier	Quarter-Finalist	24	1998
St Mary's Aghagallon	Aghagallon	Quarter-Finalist	Non-Qualifier	0	—
St Paul's	Belfast	Non-Qualifier	Relegation Play-off	3	1997
Tir-na-nÓg	Randalstown	Relegation Play-off	Relegated to 2027 I.F.C	1	1902

== Group Stage ==
=== Group 1 ===
Advance to knockout stage Advance to relegation play-off

Team	Matches				Score			Pts
Team	Pld	W	D	L	For	Against	Diff	Pts
Dunloy	3	2	0	1	69	43	+26	4
O'Donovan Rossa	3	2	0	1	64	66	-2	4
Con Magee's	3	1	1	1	60	57	+3	3
Tir-na-nÓg	3	0	1	2	55	82	-27	1

==== Round 1 ====
7 August 2026 Round 1	Dunloy	2-22 (28) – (8) 0-08	O'Donovan Rossa	Dunloy
19:00 IST (UTC+1)		(HT: 1-10 – 0-06)		Venue: Pearse Park
	Pts: Keelan Molloy 0-8 (2tp, 1tpf), Barry McCloskey 1-3, Tom McFerran 0-4 (2f), Eoghan McGrath 1-0, James Scally 0-2 (tp), Conal Cunning 0-2, Eoin McFerran 0-1, Eoin O'Neill 0-1, Seán Óg Blaney 0-1	Report	Pts: Dominic McEnhill 0-5 (3f), Thomas Morgan 0-3	Referee: Conal Roberts (St John's)

9 August 2026 Round 1	Con Magee's	2-15 (21) – (21) 1-18	Tir-na-nÓg	Glenravel
16:30 IST (UTC+1)		(HT: 1-07 – 0-07)		Venue: Fr Maginn Park
		Report		Referee: Paul Burns (St Comgall's)

==== Round 2 ====
22 August 2026 Round 2	Tir-na-nÓg	1-16 (19) – (33) 2-27	Dunloy	Randalstown
16:00 IST (UTC+1)		(HT: 1-08 – 1-11)		Venue: Tir-na-nÓg GAA
	Pts: Darragh Fagan 1-6 (2tpf, 1f), Ciarán O'Neill 0-6 (3tp), Oliver McAtamney 0-2, Ciarán Logan 0-1, Seán Duffin 0-1	Report	Pts: Keelan Molloy 1-12 (1pen, 3tpf, 2tp, 1'45), Luke McFerran 1-2, Tom McFerran 0-4 (1tp), Eoin McFerran 0-3 (1tp), Conal Cunning 0-2, Nigel Elliott 0-2, Eoghan McGrath 0-2	Referee: Ritchie Leahy (St Ergnat's)

23 August 2026 Round 2	O'Donovan Rossa	5-13 (28) – (23) 3-14	Con Magee's	Belfast
13:00 IST (UTC+1)		(HT: 3-07 – 1-07)		Venue: Rossa Park
	Pts: Thomas Morgan 2-3, Diarmuid Rogan 2-0, Dominic McEnhill 1-3 (1tpf), Eoghan McMenamin 0-3, Stephen Beatty 0-2, Colm Fleming 0-2 (2f)	Report	Pts: Colla Ward 2-2, Ryan McQuillan 1-1 (1f), Shea O'Brien 0-3, Niall Hynds 0-3, Rian Lennon 0-2 (tp), Cormac McKeown 0-1, Cathal Hynds 0-1, Eamon Ward 0-1	Referee: Paddy Tumelty (Lámh Dhearg)

==== Round 3 ====
5 September 2026 Round 3	Con Magee's	2-10 (16) – (8) 0-08	Dunloy	Ballymena
14:00 IST (UTC+1)				Venue: Slemish Park
		Report

5 September 2026 Round 3	Tir-na-nÓg	2-09 (15) – (28) 4-16	O'Donovan Rossa
14:00 IST (UTC+1)		(HT: 1-04 – 1-12)
	Pts: Darragh Fagan 0-5 (1tpf), Eamon Óg McAllister 1-0, Caleb Smith 1-0, Barry McCormick 0-2 (tp), Cormac Delvin 0-1, Oliver McAtamney 0-1	Report	Pts: Dominic McEnhill 1-8 (3tpf, 2f), Stephen Beatty 2-2, Thomas Morgan 1-2, Colm Fleming 0-3 (1tpf, 1'45), Michael McEnhill 0-1	Referee: Colly Thompson (St John's)

=== Group 2 ===
Advance to knockout stage Advance to relegation play-off

Team	Matches				Score			Pts
Team	Pld	W	D	L	For	Against	Diff	Pts
St John's	3	3	0	0	54	46	+8	6
Creggan Kickhams	3	2	0	1	62	47	+15	4
All Saints	3	1	0	2	69	57	+12	2
St Paul's	3	0	0	3	36	71	-35	0

==== Round 1 ====
9 August 2026 Round 1	All Saints	4-19 (31) – (9) 0-09	St Paul's	Ballymena
16:30 IST (UTC+1)		(HT: 2-10 – 0-02)		Venue: Slemish Park
		Report		Referee: Ray Matthews (O'Donovan Rossa)

9 August 2026 Round 1	Creggan Kickhams	0-13 (13) – (15) 1-12	St John's	Creggan
18:30 IST (UTC+1)		(HT: 0-07 – 1-04)		Venue: Páirc Ciceam
	Pts: Ruairí McCann 0-3, Liam Quinn 0-2, Shea McCann 0-2 (1f), Eunan McAteer 0-1, Dominic McAteer 0-1, Keelan McCann 0-1 (f), Seán Duffin 0-1, Joe McAteer 0-1	Report	Pts: Paddy McBride 0-4 (1tpf), Conor Hand 1-1, Ryan McNulty 0-2, Chris O'Neill 0-1, Conal Bohill 0-1, Conall Quinn 0-1, Ronan Quinn 0-1, Odhran Quinn 0-1	Referee: Darren McKeown (St Gall's)

==== Round 2 ====
22 August 2026 Round 2	St Paul's	1-11 (14) – (24) 3-15	Creggan Kickhams	Belfast
18:30 IST (UTC+1)		(HT: 0-07 – 2-09)		Venue: Páirc Naomh Pól
	Pts: Ciarán O'Dufaigh 0-9 (3tpf, 3f), Shea Burns 1-0, Seán Óg McLaren 0-1, Conal Duffy 0-1	Report	Pts: Kevin Small 1-4, Jamie McCann 1-3 (1f), Conor Johnston 1-1, Conor Small 0-3 (2f), Seán Duffin 0-2, Eunan McAteer 0-1, Kevin Rice 0-1	Referee: Paul Burns (St Comgall's)

23 August 2026 Round 2	St John's	2-17 (23) – (20) 2-14	All Saints	Belfast
17:30 IST (UTC+1)				Venue: Corrigan Park
	Pts: Conor Hand 1-4 (1tpf), Patrick McBride 0-7 (1tp, 4f), Simon McDonagh 1-0, Ryan McNulty 0-3 (1tp), Seán Wilson 0-1, Conal McGlade 0-1, Conor Adams 0-1	Report	Pts: Connell Lemon 1-2, Brendan McDonnell 0-5 (2f), James McDonnell 1-0, Conor Stewart 0-3, Paddy McAleer 0-3 (1tp), Ciarán Campbell 0-1	Referee: Brendan Toland (Lámh Dhearg)

==== Round 3 ====
6 September 2026 Round 3	All Saints	2-12 (18) – (25) 3-16	Creggan Kickhams	Randalstown
13:30 IST (UTC+1)		(HT: 2-02 – 1-11)		Venue: Tir-na-nÓg GAA
	Pts: Conor Stewart 1-3 (1tpf), Paddy McAleer 1-2 (1pen, 1f), Kavaan Keenan 0-3 (1tpf), Brendan McDonnell 0-2 (2f), Shaun O'Callaghan 0-1, Paidin Mitchell 0-1	Report	Pts: Conor Small 1-5 (2f), Jpe McAteer 0-4, Shea McCann 1-0 (pen), Tiernan McAteer 1-0, Ruairí McCann 0-2, Dominic McAteer 0-1, Keelan McCann 0-1, Kevin Small 0-1, Conor Johnston 0-1, Conor McCann 0-1	Referee: Mark O'Neill (Glen Rovers)

6 September 2026 Round 3	St Paul's	1-10 (13) – (16) 2-10	St John's	Belfast
13:30 IST (UTC+1)				Venue: Páirc Lámh Dhearg

=== Group 3 ===
Advance to knockout stage Advance to relegation play-off

Team	Matches				Score			Pts
Team	Pld	W	D	L	For	Against	Diff	Pts
Erin's Own, Cargin	3	3	0	0	68	47	+21	6
St Brigid's	3	2	0	1	83	43	+40	4
St Gall's	3	1	0	2	56	61	-5	2
St Ergnat's	3	0	0	3	41	97	-56	0

==== Round 1 ====
7 August 2026 Round 1	St Gall's	2-23 (29) – (17) 1-14	St Ergnat's	Belfast
19:00 IST (UTC+1)				Venue: De la Salle Park
	Pts: Danny Quinn 0-8 (2f), Bairre McCaffrey 1-4, Callum Walsh 0-4 (1tp), Marty Murray 1-0, Mickey Pollock 0-3, Gerard O'Neill 0-2, Niall Burns 0-2	Report	Pts: Tiernan McCormack 0-5, Conleth McCann 1-0, Seán Boyd 0-3, Seanchan Duffin 0-2 (tp), Colm Duffiin 0-2 (1f), Caolan Boyd 0-1, Aidan McErlain 0-1	Referee: Brendan Toland (Lámh Dhearg)

8 August 2026 Round 1	Erin's Own, Cargin	2-15 (21) – (18) 0-18	St Brigid's	Toome
18:45 IST (UTC+1)		(HT: 0-09 – 0-05)		Venue: Shore Road
	Pts: James Laverty 1-2 (1tp), Tomás McCann 0-4 (3f), Pat Shivers 0-4 (1tp), John McNabb 0-3 (1tpf, 1'45), Ciarán Bradley 1-0, Benen Kelly 0-1, Conor Johnston 0-1	Report	Pts: Ronan McGrady 0-4 (1tp, 1tpf), Paul Bradley 0-4 (1tp, 2f), JJ Higgins 0-3, Niall Duffy 0-2 (1f), Jack Dowling 0-2 (tp), James Smith 0-1, Joseph Finnegan 0-1, Reuben Carleton 0-1	Referee: Colm McDonald (St Gall's)

==== Round 2 ====
22 August 2026 Round 2	St Ergnat's	0-15 (15) – (27) 3-18	Erin's Own, Cargin	Moneyglass
16:00 IST (UTC+1)				Venue: St Ergnat's Park
		Report		Referee: Conal Roberts (St John's)

23 August 2026 Round 2	St Brigid's	1-21 (24) – (13) 1-10	St Gall's	Belfast
15:00 IST (UTC+1)		(HT: 1-10 – 1-03)		Venue: Musgrave Park
	Pts: Ronan McGrady 1-3 (1f), John Morgan 0-4, Niall Duffy 0-3, James Smith 0-2, Joseph Finnegan 0-2, Patrick Finnegan 0-2, Paul Bradley 0-1 (f), Jack Dowling 0-1, Dara Quinn 0-1, JJ Higgins 0-1, Conan McNicholl 0-1	Report	Pts: Daniel Quinn 0-6 (5f), Padraig Muirigh 1-2, Callum Walsh 0-1, B McCaffrey 0-1	Referee: Colly Thompson (St John's)

==== Round 3 ====
6 September 2026 Round 3	St Gall's	1-11 (14) – (20) 2-14	Erin's Own, Cargin	Glenavy
16:00 IST (UTC+1)				Venue: Glenavy GAC
	Pts: Daniel Quinn 0-5 (3f), Callum Walsh 1-2, Gerard O'Neill 0-2 (tp), Niall Burns 0-1, Mickey Pollock 0-1	Report	Pts: Conhuir Johnston 1-3 (1f), Pat Shivers 0-4 (1tp, 1f), Gerard McCann 1-0, John McNabb 0-2 (tpf), James Laverty 0-1, Jack O'Neill 0-1, Conan Johnston 0-1, Michael McCann 0-1, John Carron 0-1	Referee: Brendan Toland (Lámh Dhearg)

6 September 2026 Round 3	St Ergnat's	0-09 (9) – (41) 7-20	St Brigid's	Ahoghill
16:00 IST (UTC+1)		(HT: 0-07 – 3-10)		Venue: Fr McGuigan Park
		Report		Referee: Kevin Parke (Naomh Éanna)

=== Group 4 ===
Advance to knockout stage Advance to relegation play-off

Team	Matches				Score			Pts
Team	Pld	W	D	L	For	Against	Diff	Pts
Roger Casement's	3	3	0	0	79	48	+31	6
Lámh Dhearg	3	2	0	1	52	49	+3	4
St Mary's Aghagallon	3	1	0	2	82	48	+34	2
Patrick Sarsfields	3	0	0	3	35	103	-68	0

==== Round 1 ====
8 August 2026 Round 1	St Mary's Aghagallon	7-27 (48) – (8) 0-08	Patrick Sarsfields	Aghagallon
14:00 IST (UTC+1)		(HT: 4-12 – 0-05)		Venue: St Mary's Aghagallon GAC
		Report		Referee: Brendan Toland (Lámh Dhearg)

8 August 2026 Round 1	Roger Casement's	1-17 (20) – (16) 1-13	Lámh Dhearg	Portglenone
16:00 IST (UTC+1)		(HT: 1-11 – 1-04)		Venue: Roger Casement's Portglenone GAC
		Report		Referee: Colly Thompson (St John's)

==== Round 2 ====
21 August 2026 Round 2	Lámh Dhearg	1-15 (18) – (16) 2-10	St Mary's Aghagallon	Belfast
18:45 IST (UTC+1)		(HT: 0-06 – 1-05)		Venue: Páirc Lámh Dhearg
	Pts: Ryan Murray 0-8 (1tp, 2tpf), Conor Murray 1-0, Marc Jordan 0-3 (1tp), Mark Finnegan 0-2 (tp), Ben Rice 0-1, Paddy Cunningham 0-1 (f)	Report	Pts: Adam Loughran 2-2, Jack Lenehan 0-2 (tp), Eoin Brankin 0-2, Luke Mulholland 0-1 (f), Eunan Walsh 0-1, Enda McCartan 0-1, Jonny Hannon 0-1 (f)	Referee: Mark O'Neill (Glen Rovers)

23 August 2026 Round 2	Patrick Sarsfields	1-11 (14) – (36) 4-25	Roger Casement's	Belfast
18:45 IST (UTC+1)		(HT: 0-03 – 3-14)		Venue: Patrick Sarsfields Youth Club
	Pts: Garry Lennon 0-4 (2f), Jay Maguire 0-4 (1f), Cormac Murray 1-0, Philip McPeake 0-1, Joe McNally 0-1	Report	Pts: Odhran Doherty 1-7 (2tp), Aidan McAleese 0-8 (2tp, 2tpf), Michael Hagan 1-2 (1f), Ciarán McAleese 1-2 (1tp), Dermot McAleese 1-0, Daniel McNichol 0-1, Ruairí Hagan 0-1, Oisín Doherty 0-1, Tom Duffin 0-1, Stephen Kelly 0-1, Seán Byrne 0-1	Referee: Cathal McDermott (Tir-na-nÓg)

==== Round 3 ====
5 September 2026 Round 3	St Mary's Aghagallon	0-18 (18) – (22) 2-16	Roger Casement's	Toome
17:30 IST (UTC+1)		(HT: 0-10 – 2-06)		Venue: Shore Road
		Report		Referee: Conal Roberts (St John's)

5 September 2026 Round 3	Patrick Sarsfields	0-13 (13) – (18) 1-15	Lámh Dhearg	Lurgan
17:30 IST (UTC+1)				Venue: Davitt Park

== Relegation Group ==
The bottom placed team in the relegation group drops down to the 2027 Antrim I.F.C.

Relegated to 2027 I.F.C.

Team	Matches				Score			Pts
Team	Pld	W	D	L	For	Against	Diff	Pts
St Ergnat's	1	1	0	0	32	23	+9	2
St Paul's	1	1	0	0	26	20	+6	2
Patrick Sarsfields	2	0	0	2	43	58	-15	0

=== Round 1 ===
19 September 2026 Round 1	St Ergnat's	6-14 (32) – (23) 3-14	Patrick Sarsfields	Moneyglass
14:00 IST (UTC+1)				Venue: St Ergnat's Park
		Report		Referee: Colm McDonald (St Gall's)

=== Round 2 ===
3 October 2026 Round 2	Patrick Sarsfields	0-20 (20) – (26) 6-08	St Paul's	Belfast
14:00 IST (UTC+1)				Venue: Patrick Sarsfields Youth Club
		Report

== Knockout-Stage ==
=== Bracket ===
Quarter-finals
18 September, Ballymena
Erin's Own, Cargin	2-17
Creggan Kickhams	0-14
20 September, Belfast
Roger Casement's	3-20
O'Donovan Rossa (AET)	2-24
19 September, Belfast
St John's	1-16
St Brigid's	3-11
20 September, Toome
Dunloy	5-15
Lámh Dhearg	3-12

Semi-finals
4 October, Belfast
Erin's Own, Cargin	1-16
O'Donovan Rossa	2-15
3 October, Antrim
St Brigid's	0-17
Dunloy	0-08

Final
18 October, Belfast
O'Donovan Rossa	1-16
St Brigid's	0-21

=== Quarter-Finals ===
18 September 2026 Quarter-Final	Erin's Own, Cargin	2-17 (23) – (14) 0-14	Creggan Kickhams	Ballymena
19:30 IST (UTC+1)		(HT: 1-09 – 0-07)		Venue: Slemish Park
	Pts: Conhuir Johnston 0-8 (2tpf, 2f), James Laverty 1-0, Jack O'Neill 1-0, Pat Shivers 0-2 (tp), Jamie Cribbin 0-2 (tp), Conan Johnston 0-1, Jack O'Neill 0-1	Report	Pts: Conor Small 0-6 (2tpf, 1f), Kevin Small 0-4 (1tp), Conor Johnston 0-1, Jamie McCann 0-1, Keelan McCann 0-1, Ethan Carey-Small 0-1	Referee: Colly Thompson (St John's)

19 September 2026 Quarter-Final	St John's	1-16 (19) – (20) 3-11	St Brigid's	Belfast
17:00 IST (UTC+1)		(HT: 1-09 – 3-07)		Venue: Páirc Lámh Dhearg
	Pts: Paddy McBride 0-9 (1tpf, 6f, 1'45), Conor Adams 0-3 (1tp), Conor McEvoy 1-0 (pen), Simon McDonagh 0-1, Conor Hand 0-1, Ryan McNulty 0-1, Conal Bohill 0-1	Report	Pts: Ronan McGrady 1-4 (1tpf, 2f), James Smith 1-1, JJ Higgins 0-3, Paul Bradley 0-2 (tp), Niall Duffy 0-1	Referee: Brendan Toland (Lámh Dhearg)

20 September 2026 Quarter-Final	Roger Casement's	3-20 (29) – (30) 2-24 (a.e.t.)	O'Donovan Rossa	Belfast
13:15 IST (UTC+1)		(HT: 2-08 – 0-09) (FT: 3-14 – 1-20)		Venue: Corrigan Park
	Pts: Oisín Doherty 1-6 (1tp, 3f), Ciarán McAleese 0-4, Aiden McAleese 0-3, Tom Duffin 1-0, Odhran Doherty 1-0, Michael Hagan 0-2, Dermott McAleese 0-2, Paddy Kelly 0-2, Caolan Tierney 0-1	Report	Pts: Dominic McEnhill 2-2 (1pen, 1f), Thomas Morgan 0-6 (1f), Eoghan McMenamin 0-5 (1tp), Colm Fleming 0-4 (2tpf), Corey Walsh 0-2, Diarmuid Rogan 0-2, Stephen Beatty 0-2, Cormac McGettigan 0-1	Referee: Paddy Tumelty (Lámh Dhearg)

20 September 2026 Quarter-Final	Dunloy	5-15 (30) – (21) 3-12	Lámh Dhearg	Toome
16:30 IST (UTC+1)		(HT: 2-11 – 1-02)		Venue: Shore Road
	Pts: Seaan Elliott 0-9 (3tp), Nigel Elliott 2-0, Luke McFerran 1-1, Barry McCloskey 1-1, Conor Kinsella 1-0, Keelan Molloy 0-2 (1f), Tom McFerran 0-1, Ryan McGarry 0-1	Report	Pts: Conor Murray 0-4 (2f), Ryan Murray 1-0, Donal Martin 1-0, Paddy Cunningham 0-3 (1f, 1tp), Ben Rice 0-2, Ross Fitzsimons 0-1, Jack Davitt 0-1, Callum Fegan-Lappin 0-1	Referee: Conal Roberts (St John's)

=== Semi-Finals ===
3 October 2026 Semi-Final	St Brigid's	0-17 (17) – (8) 0-08	Dunloy	Antrim
19:00 IST (UTC+1)		(HT: 0-05 – 0-05)		Venue: St Comgall's GAC
	Pts: JJ Higgins 0-6, Niall Duffy 0-3 (1f), James Smith 0-2, Paul Bradley 0-2 (tp), Joseph Finnegan 0-2, Shay Campbell 0-1, Joe Logan 0-1	Report	Pts: Conal Cunning 0-3, Seaan Elliott 0-3 (1tp, 1f), Eoin McFerran 0-1, Keelan Molloy 0-1	Referee: Kevin Parke (Naomh Éanna)

4 October 2026 Semi-Final	O'Donovan Rossa	2-15 (21) – (19) 1-16	Erin's Own, Cargin	Belfast
16:00 IST (UTC+1)		(HT: 1-06 – 1-11)		Venue: Corrigan Park
	Pts: Dominic McEnhill 1-5 (2f), Colin Fleming 0-4 (2tpf), Liam McEnhill 0-3 (1tp), Thomas Morgan 1-0, Gerard Walsh 0-2 (tp), Eoghan McMenamin 0-1	Report	Pts: James Laverty 1-3 (1tp), Conhuir Johnston 0-4 (1tp,1f), Michael McCann 0-3, Tom Shivers 0-2, Pat Shivers 0-2, Ciarán Bradley 0-1, John McNabb 0-1 ('45)	Referee: Mark O'Neill (Glen Rovers)

=== Final ===
St Brigid's entered their first ever SFC final since their founding in 1998.

O'Donovan Rossa entered their 18th championship final, and their first since 1991. O'Donovan Rossa had only lost one championship final in their history (1975), and were looking to win their 17th championship title.

18 October 2026
15:00 IST (UTC+1)

Report

St Brigid's	0-21 (21) – (19) 1-16	O'Donovan Rossa
(HT: 0-10 – 0-08)
Pts: JJ Higgins 0-7 (1f), Ronan McGrady 0-6 (1tpf, 1f), James Smith 0-2, Paul Bradley 0-2, Dara Quinn 0-1, Jack Dowling 0-1, Niall Duffy 0-1, Patrick Finnegan 0-1		Pts: Diarmaid Rogan 1-0, Stephen Beatty 0-3 (1tp), Dominic McEnhill 0-3 (2f), Liam McEnhill 0-2 (tp), Gerard Walsh 0-2 (1tp), Thomas Morgan 0-2, Michael Byrne 0-1 ('45)

Corrigan Park, Belfast
Referee: Colly Thompson (St John's)

St Brigid's	O'Donovan Rossa
