= 2017 Antrim Senior Football Championship =

Gaelic football competition

Antrim SFC
- Season: 2017
- Champions: Lámh Dhearg (4th title)
- Relegated: ???
- Winning Captain: John Finucane
- Winning Manager: Martin Lynch

The 2017 Antrim Senior Football Championship is the 116th official edition of Antrim GAA's premier club Gaelic football tournament for senior clubs in County Antrim. The tournament consists of 13 teams with the winner representing Antrim in the Ulster Senior Club Football Championship. The championship has a straight knock-out format.

St Paul's, St James' and St Mary's returned to the senior championship in 2017.

Erin's Own GAC, Cargin were the defending champions after they defeated St Gall's in the 2016 final.

== Promoted from 2016 IFC ==
- St Mary's Aghagallon - (IFC Champions & Div 2A FL Champions)
- St Paul's - (2nd in Div 2A FL)
- St James' - (Ongoing participation in Div 1 FL)

== Relegated to 2017 IFC ==
- All Saints (12th in Division 1B FL)
- St Brigid's (11th in Division 1B FL)

== Round 1 ==
10 of the 13 senior clubs play in this round. The 5 winners and the 3 teams who received byes compete in the quarter-finals. The 5 losing teams exit the championship.

18 August 2017; 7:30 pm First round	Cargin	3-15 - 0-6	O'Donovan Rossa	Ahoghill; Referee: Karol Doherty (Rasharkin)
18 August 2017; 7:30 pm First round	Kieran Close 1-7, Michael McCann and Tomas McCann 1-1 each, John Carron and Michael Magill 0-3 each	Report	Deaglain Murphy 0-3 (0-1f), Stephen Beatty, Darren Grego, Sean Pat Donnelly (0-1f) 0-1 each	Ahoghill; Referee: Karol Doherty (Rasharkin)

19 August 2017; 5:00 pm First round	Lámh Dhearg	1-14 - 0-7	St Paul's	Corrigan Park; Referee: Fiontann McCotter (Sarsfields)
19 August 2017; 5:00 pm First round	Ryan Murray 1-2, Ciaran Flaherty and Paddy Cunningham (0-2f) 0-3 each, Kevin Quinn 0-2 (0-1f), Patrick Larkin, Brendan McComb, Eoin McKeown, Ben Rice 0-1 each	Report	Liam McKenna 0-3f, Damian Martin 0-2 (0-1f), Padraic Lowe 0-1	Corrigan Park; Referee: Fiontann McCotter (Sarsfields)

20 August 2017; 1:30 pm First round	St John's	2-16 - 1-7	St. James Aldergrove	Páirc Lámh Dhearg, Hannahstown; Referee: Eammon McAuley (Cargin)
20 August 2017; 1:30 pm First round		Report		Páirc Lámh Dhearg, Hannahstown; Referee: Eammon McAuley (Cargin)

20 August 2017; 3:30 pm First round	St Gall's	1-14 - 1-12	Roger Casement's Portglenone	Páirc Lámh Dhearg, Hannahstown; Referee: Sean Laverty (Moneyglass)
20 August 2017; 3:30 pm First round		Report		Páirc Lámh Dhearg, Hannahstown; Referee: Sean Laverty (Moneyglass)

20 August 2017; 7:00 pm First round	St Mary's Aghagallon	3-10 - 2-12	St Teresa's	Glenavy; Referee: Gerard Dougan (Creggan)
20 August 2017; 7:00 pm First round		Report		Glenavy; Referee: Gerard Dougan (Creggan)

== Quarter-finals ==
The 5 Round 1 winners and the 3 teams who received byes in Round 1 compete in this round. The losing teams exit the championship.

1 September 2017; 6:00 pm Quarter-Final	Lámh Dhearg	3-14 - 2-13	St Gall's	Corrigan Park; Referee: Sean Laverty (Moneyglass)
1 September 2017; 6:00 pm Quarter-Final	Paddy Cunningham 0-8 (0-7f), Conor Murray 2-1, Ciaran Flaherty 1-2, Ryan Murray 0-2, Domhnall Nugent 1 '45	Report	CJ McGourty 1-5 (0-2f), Niall O’Neill 1-1, Brendan Bradley (0-1f) and Mark Cummings 0-2 each, Jackson McGreevy, Michael Pollock, Kieran McGourty 0-1 each	Corrigan Park; Referee: Sean Laverty (Moneyglass)

1 September 2017; 7:30 pm Quarter-Final	Cargin	0-16 - 1-8	St Mary's Aghagallon	Ahoghill; Referee: Gerard Dougan (Creggan)
1 September 2017; 7:30 pm Quarter-Final	Tomas McCann 0-10 (0-3f, 1 '45), Kieran Close 0-3, Justin Crozier, John Carron, Tony Scullion 0-1 each	Report	Ciaran Brady 1-0, Shane Russell (0-1f) and Gareth Magee (0-2f) 0-2 each, Paul Mulholland (1 '45), Oisin Lenehan, Des Marshall, Ruairi McCann 0-1 each	Ahoghill; Referee: Gerard Dougan (Creggan)

2 September 2017; 6:00 pm Quarter-Final	Creggan Kickhams	0-13 - 1-7	St Mary's Ahoghill	Cargin; Referee: Brendan Toland (Lámh Dhearg)
2 September 2017; 6:00 pm Quarter-Final		Report		Cargin; Referee: Brendan Toland (Lámh Dhearg)

2 September 2017; 6:00 pm Quarter-Final	St John's	2-15 - 0-9	St Joseph's Glenavy	Lámh Dhearg; Referee: Paul McKeever
2 September 2017; 6:00 pm Quarter-Final		Report		Lámh Dhearg; Referee: Paul McKeever

== Semi-finals ==
30 September 2017; 3:30 pm Semi Final	Lámh Dhearg	1-13 - 1-9	Creggan Kickhams	Glenavy; Referee: Karol Doherty (Rasharkin)
30 September 2017; 3:30 pm Semi Final	Paddy Cunningham 1-7 (0-6f), Conor Murray 0-3, Brendan McComb, Domhnall Nugent, Eoghan McKeown 0-1 each	Report	Kevin Small 1-1, Conor Small 0-3, Ruairi McCann 0-2 (0-1f), Sam Maguire, Liam Quinn, Aidan McKeown 0-1 each	Glenavy; Referee: Karol Doherty (Rasharkin)

1 October 2017; 3:30 pm Semi Final	St John's	0-11 - 0-11	Cargin	Lamh Dhearg; Referee: Paul McKeever (Casements)
1 October 2017; 3:30 pm Semi Final	Patrick McBride 0-3, Padraig Nugent (2 '45), Ryan McNulty (0-2f) and Matthew Fitzpatrick 0-2 each, Michael Bradley and Conor Johnston 0-1 each	Report	Tomas McCann 0-4 (0-3f), Michael McCann and Kieran Close (0-1f) 0-2 each, John Carron, Kevin O'Boyle, Jamie Gribben 0-1 each	Lamh Dhearg; Referee: Paul McKeever (Casements)

8 October 2017; 4:00 pm Semi Final Replay	St John's	3-17 - 0-21 (a.e.t.)	Cargin	Glenavy; Referee: Sean Laverty (Moneyglass)
8 October 2017; 4:00 pm Semi Final Replay	Patrick McBride 0-7 (0-5f), Conor Johnston 1-4, Ryan McNulty 0-3 (0-2f), Matthew Fitzpatrick and Peter McCallin 1-0 each, Michael Bradley, Conor McAvoy, Conal McGlade 0-1 each	Report	Kieran Close 0-11 (0-7f), Tomas McCann 0-8 (0-6f), James Laverty and Paul McCann 0-1 each	Glenavy; Referee: Sean Laverty (Moneyglass)

== Final ==
15 October 2017; 3:15 pm Final	Lámh Dhearg	0-15 - 0-13	St John's	Glenavy; Referee: Eamonn McAuley (Erin’s Own)
15 October 2017; 3:15 pm Final	Paddy Cunningham 0-8 (0-5f), Paddy Mervyn, Declan Lynch, Brendan McComb, Ciaran Flaherty, Conor Murray, Ryan Murray, Kevin Quinn 0-1 each	Report	Patrick McBride 0-5 (0-2f), Jack Hannigan 0-4, Ryan McNulty 0-2 (0-1f), Conor Johnston and Matthew Fitzpatrick 0-1 each	Glenavy; Referee: Eamonn McAuley (Erin’s Own)

== Championship Bracket ==
Round 1
St Gall's	1-14
Roger Casement's Portglenone	1-12
St Paul's	0-7
Lámh Dhearg	1-14
St John's	2-17
St James'	1-8
Erin's Own Cargin	3-15
O'Donovan Rossa	0-6
St Mary's Aghagallon	3-10
St Teresa's	2-12

Quarter-Finals
Creggan Kickhams	0-13
St Mary's Ahoghill	1-7
St Gall's	2-13
Lámh Dhearg	3-14
St John's	2-15
St Joseph's Glenavy	0-9
Erin's Own Cargin	0-16
St Mary's Aghagallon	1-8

Semi-Finals
Creggan Kickhams	1-9
Lámh Dhearg	1-13
St John's	0-11 (3-17 R)
Erin's Own Cargin	0-11 (0-21 R)

Final
Lámh Dhearg	0-15
St John's	0-13
