= 2016 Antrim Senior Football Championship =

Gaelic football competition

Antrim SFC
- Season: 2016
- Champions: Erin's Own Cargin
- Relegated: All Saints; St Brigid's
- Winning Captain: Kevin O'Boyle (Erin's Own Cargin)

The 2016 Antrim Senior Football Championship is the 115th official edition of Antrim GAA's premier club gaelic football tournament for senior clubs in County Antrim. The tournament consists of 12 teams with the winner representing Antrim in the Ulster Senior Club Football Championship. The championship has a straight knock-out format.

All Saints, St Brigid's and St Joseph's Glenavy returned to the senior championship in 2016.

Eirn's Own Cargin (Clann na hÉireann, Carraigín) were the defending champions after they defeated Lámh Dhearg 2–11 to 1–5 in the 2015 final. They successfully defended their title to claim a "2-in-a-row" of championships on 16 October 2016 at Corrigan Park when defeating St Gall's on a scoreline of 1–10 to 0–6.

== Promoted to SFC from IFC in 2015 ==
- St Joseph's Glenavy - (IFC Champions)
- All Saints
- St Brigid's

== Relegated from SFC to IFC in 2015 ==
- St James' Aldergrove
- St Paul's

== Round 1 ==
8 of the 12 senior clubs play in this round. The 4 winners proceed to the quarter-finals to play the 4 teams who received byes in Round 1. The 4 losers exit the championship.

- Creggan Kickhams 1-16, 1-9 St Mary's Ahoghill, Moneyglass, 12/8/2016,
- All Saints 1-14, 0-10 St Teresa's, Ahoghill, 14/8/2016,
- Roger Casement's Portglenone 1-11, 1-9 St Joseph's Glenavy, Ahoghill, 14/8/2016,
- O'Donovan Rossa 1-16, 1-13 St Brigid's, Hannahstown, 14/8/2016,

== Quarter-finals ==
The 4 Round 1 winners play the 4 teams who received byes in Round 1.

- St John's 1-10, 0-6 All Saints Ballymena, Ahoghill, 2/9/2016,
- Erin's Own Cargin 2–9, 1-12 Creggan Kickhams, Ahoghill, 2/9/2016,
- Lámh Dhearg 0–12, 1-9 O'Donovan Rossa, Corrigan Park, 3/9/2016,
- St Gall's 0-15, 0-11 Roger Casement's Portglenone, Corrigan Park, 3/9/2016,
- Erin's Own Cargin 2-10, 0-10 Creggan Kickhams, Ahoghill, 10/9/2016, (Replay)
- Lámh Dhearg 2-12, 2-6 O'Donovan Rossa, Corrigan Park, 24/9/2016, (Replay)

== Semi-finals ==
- Erin's Own Cargin 1-21 2-12 St John's, Glenavy, 2/10/2016
- St Gall's 1-7 0-8 Lámh Dhearg, Ahoghill, 5/10/2016

== Final ==
16 October 2016
Final

Erin's Own Cargin	1-10 - 0-6	St Gall's
	Report

Corrigan Park

== Championship Bracket ==
Round 1
Roger Casement's Portglenone	1-11
St Joseph's Glenavy	1-9
O'Donovan Rossa	1-16
St Brigid's	1-13
St Mary's Ahoghill	1-9
Creggan Kickhams	1-16
All Saints	1-14
St Teresa's	0-10

Quarter-Finals
St Gall's	0-15
Roger Casement's Portglenone	0-11
Lámh Dhearg	0-12; 2-12
O'Donovan Rossa	1-9; 2-6
Erin's Own, Cargin	2-9; 2-10
Creggan Kickhams	1-12; 0-10
St John's	1-10
All Saints	0-6

Semi-Finals
St Gall's	1-7
Lámh Dhearg	0-8
Erin's Own, Cargin	1-21
St John's	2-12

Final
St Gall's	0-6
Erin's Own, Cargin	1-10
