= 2016 Ulster Senior Club Football Championship =

2016 Ulster Club Senior Football Championship
Tournament details
- Province: Ulster
- Year: 2016
- Trophy: Seamus McFerran Cup
- Sponsor: Allied Irish Banks
- Date: 16 October - 27 November 2016
- Teams: 9 (one from each of the 9 counties)
- Defending champions: Crossmaglen Rangers

Winners
- Champions: Slaughtneil (2nd win)
- Manager: Mickey Moran
- Captain: Francis McEldowney
- Qualify for: All-Ireland Club SFC

Runners-up
- Runners-up: Kilcoo
- Manager: Paul McIver
- Captain: Conor Laverty

Other
- Matches played: 8
- Total scored: 13-160
- Top Scorer: Ryan Johnston (Kilcoo) (2-7)
- Website: Ulster GAA

The 2016 Ulster Senior Club Football Championship was the 49th instalment of the annual Ulster Senior Club Football Championship organised by Ulster GAA. It was one of the four provincial competitions of the 2016–17 All-Ireland Senior Club Football Championship.

Armagh's Crossmaglen Rangers were the 2015 champions, but defeat in the Armagh semi-final meant they couldn't defend their title.

Derry champions Slaughtneil claimed their second Ulster title by beating Down champions Kilcoo in the final.

== Teams ==
The Ulster championship is contested by the winners of the nine county championships in the Irish province of Ulster. Ulster comprises the six counties of Northern Ireland, as well as Cavan, Donegal and Monaghan in the Republic of Ireland.

County	Team	Last win
Antrim	Erin's Own, Cargin	
Armagh	Maghery Sean MacDermott's	
Cavan	Ramor United	
Derry	Slaughtneil	2014
Donegal	Glenswilly	
Down	Kilcoo	
Fermanagh	Derrygonnelly Harps	
Monaghan	Scotstown	1989
Tyrone	Killyclogher St Mary's	

== Bracket ==
Preliminary round
Scotstown (Monaghan)	0-9
Kilcoo (Down)	1-8

Quarter-Finals
Killyclogher (Tyrone)	2-10
Erin's Own, Cargin (Antrim)	1-8
Slaughtneil (Derry)	0-12
Derrygonnelly Harps (Fermanagh)	0-7
Maghery (Armagh)	1-13
Ramor United (Cavan)	1-10
Glenswilly (Donegal)	1-6
Kilcoo (Down)	1-12

Semi-Finals
Killyclogher (Tyrone)	0-8
Slaughtneil (Derry)	1-11
Maghery (Armagh)	0-12
Kilcoo (Down)	4-13

Final
Slaughtneil (Derry)	0-12
Kilcoo (Down)	0-9

== Preliminary round ==
16 October 2016
14:30 GMT (UTC+0)
Preliminary round

Scotstown (Monaghan)	0-9 – 1-8	Kilcoo (Down)
Shane Carey 0-6 (0-4f), Rory Beggan 0-1 (0-1f), Donal Morgan 0-1, Darren Hughes 0-1	Report	Ryan Johnston 1-0, Paul Devlin 0-3 (0-2f), Martin Devlin 0-2, Donal Kane 0-1 (0-1f), Aaron Branagan 0-1, Aaron Morgan 0-1

St Tiernach's Park, Clones
Referee: Sean Hurson (Tyrone)

== Quarter-finals ==
30 October 2016
14:30 GMT (UTC+0)
Quarter-final

Killyclogher (Tyrone)	2-10 – 1-8	Erin's Own, Cargin (Antrim)
Mark Bradley 1-3 (0-2f), Simon O'Neill 0-4 (0-2f), James Carlin 1-1 Nathan Donnelly 0-1, Conall McCann 0-1	Report	Tomas McCann 0-4 (0-4f), Ryan McKernan 1-0, Kevin Close 0-2 (0-2f), Michael McCann 0-1, Paul McCann 0-1

Healy Park, Omagh
Referee: Pádraig Hughes (Armagh)

30 October 2016
14:30 GMT (UTC+0)
Quarter-final

Slaughtneil (Derry)	0-12 – 0-7	Derrygonnelly Harps (Fermanagh)
Paul Bradley 0-5 (0-4f), Shane McGuigan 0-2 (0-1f), Francis McEldowney 0-1, Patsy Bradley 0-1, Cormac O'Doherty 0-1, Karl McKaigue 0-1, Barry McGuigan 0-1	Report	Garvan Jones 0-3 (0-2f), Leigh Jones 0-2 (0-1f), Ryan Jones 0-1, Garvan McGinley 0-1

Celtic Park, Derry
Referee: Noel Mooney (Cavan)

30 October 2016
14:30 GMT (UTC+0)
Quarter-final

Maghery (Armagh)	1-13 – 1-10	Ramor United (Cavan)
Stefan Forker 0-6 (0-3f), Aidan Forker 1-1 (0-1f), Seamus Forker 0-3 (0-2f), Niall Forker, James Lavery, Stephen Cusack 0-1 each	Report	Conor Bradley 0-4 (0-2f), James Bradley 1-1 (0-1f), Jack Doyle 0-3, Cathal Maguire 0-1, Kevin Mulvany 0-1

Athletic Grounds, Armagh
Referee: Niall Cullen (Fermanagh)

30 October 2016
14:30 GMT (UTC+0)
Quarter-final

Glenswilly (Donegal)	1-6 – 1-12	Kilcoo (Down)
Michael Murphy 1-2 (1-0 pen), Oisin Crawford 0-2, Gary McFadden 0-1 (0-1f), Brian Farrelly 0-1	Report	Paul Devlin 0-4 (0-4f), Darragh O'Hanlon 1-1 (1-0 pen, 0-1f), Ryan Johnston 0-3, Niall Kane 0-1 (0-1 45), Eugene Branagan 0-1, Conor Laverty 0-1, Donal Kane 0-1

Páirc Esler, Newry
Referee: Barry Cassidy (Derry)

== Semi-finals ==
13 November 2016
14:30 GMT (UTC+0)
Semi-final

Killyclogher (Tyrone)	0-8 – 1-11	Slaughtneil (Derry)
Mark Bradley 0-4 (0-3f), Simon O'Neill 0-1 (0-1f), Conall McCann 0-1, Tiernan Cox 0-1, Martin Swift 0-1	Report	Paul Bradley 0-5 (0-5f), Meehaul McGrath 1-0, Christopher Bradley 0-2, Shane McGuigan 0-1 (0-1f), Sé McGuigan 0-1, Padraig Cassidy 0-1, Ronan Bradley 0-1

Athletic Grounds, Armagh
Referee: Ciaran Branagan (Down)

13 November 2016
14:30 GMT (UTC+0)
Semi-final

Maghery (Armagh)	0-12 – 4-13	Kilcoo (Down)
Stefan Forker 0-4 (0-2f), Aidan Forker 0-2 (0-2f), Conor Mackle 0-2, Seamus Forker 0-1 (0-1f), Niall Forker 0-1, Ronan Lappin 0-1, Ben Crealey 0-1	Report	Ceilum Doherty 2-1, Ryan Johnston 1-3, Paul Devlin 0-4 (0-3f), J. J. McLaughlin 1-0, Donal Kane 0-1 (0-1f), Gerard McEvoy 0-1 (0-1f), Eugene Branagan 0-1, Martin Devlin 0-1, Aaron Morgan 0-1

Páirc Esler, Newry
Referee: Joe McQuillan (Cavan)

== Final ==
27 November 2016
14:30 GMT (UTC+0)
Final

Slaughtneil (Derry)	0-12 – 0-9	Kilcoo (Down)
Shane McGuigan 0-5 (0-2f), Paul Bradley 0-2 (0-2f), Brendan Rogers 0-2, Chrissy McKaigue 0-1, Christopher Bradley 0-1, Cormac O'Doherty 0-1	Report	Ceilum Doherty 0-3, Darragh O'Hanlon 0-2 (0-2f), Paul Devlin 0-1 (0-1f), Darryl Branagan 0-1, Ryan Johnston 0-1, Martin Devlin 0-1

Athletic Grounds, Armagh
Attendance: 9,125
Referee: Sean Hurson (Tyrone)

== Championship statistics ==
=== Top scorers ===
Overall

Rank	Player	Club	Tally	Total	Matches	Average
1	Ryan Johnston	Kilcoo	2-7	13	4	3.25
2	Paul Bradley	Slaughtneil	0-12	12	3	4.00
2	Paul Devlin	Kilcoo	0-12	12	4	3.00
4	Ceilum Doherty	Kilcoo	2-4	10	4	2.50
4	Mark Bradley	Killyclogher	1-7	10	2	5.00
4	Stefan Forker	Maghery	0-20	10	2	5.00
7	Shane McGuigan	Slaughtneil	0-8	8	3	2.67
8	Aidan Forker	Maghery	1-3	6	2	3.00
8	Darragh O'Hanlon	Kilcoo	1-3	6	4	1.50
8	Shane Carey	Scotstown	0-6	6	1	6.00

In a single game

Rank	Player	Club	Tally	Total	Opposition
1	Ceilum Doherty	Kilcoo	2-1	7	Maghery
2	Mark Bradley	Killyclogher	1-3	6	Erin's Own, Cargin
2	Ryan Johnston	Kilcoo	1-3	6	Maghery
2	Shane Carey	Scotstown	0-6	6	Kilcoo
2	Stefan Forker	Maghery	0-6	6	Ramor United
6	Michael Murphy	Glenswilly	1-2	5	Kilcoo
6	Paul Bradley	Slaughtneil	0-5	5	Derrygonnelly Harps
6	Paul Bradley	Slaughtneil	0-5	5	Killyclogher
6	Shane McGuigan	Slaughtneil	0-5	5	Kilcoo
10	James Carlin	Killyclogher	1-1	4	Erin's Own, Cargin
10	Aidan Forker	Maghery	1-1	4	Ramor United
10	James Bradley	Ramor United	1-1	4	Maghery
10	Darragh O'Hanlon	Kilcoo	1-1	4	Glenswilly
10	Tomas McCann	Erin's Own, Cargin	0-4	4	Killyclogher
10	Simon O'Neill	Killyclogher	0-4	4	Erin's Own, Cargin
10	Conor Bradley	Ramor United	0-4	4	Maghery
10	Mark Bradley	Killyclogher	0-4	4	Slaughtneil
10	Paul Devlin	Kilcoo	0-4	4	Glenswilly
10	Paul Devlin	Kilcoo	0-4	4	Maghery
10	Stefan Forker	Maghery	0-4	4	Kilcoo
