= Seán Rice =

Irish Gaelic footballer and hurler (1942–2025)

Personal information
- Native name: Seán Rís (Irish)
- Born: 3 April 1942 Belfast, Northern Ireland
- Died: 29 June 2025 (aged 83) Lisburn, Northern Ireland
- Occupation: Teacher
- Height: 5 ft 5 in (165 cm)

Sport
- Sport: Gaelic football
- Position: Left corner-forward
Club
- Years: Club
- Éire Óg
Club titles
- Antrim titles: 0
Inter-county
- Years: County
- 1960–1967: Antrim
Inter-county titles
- Ulster titles: 0
- All-Irelands: 0
- NFL: 0
- All Stars: 0

Seán Rice (3 April 1942 – 29 June 2025) was a Northern Irish Gaelic footballer and hurler. At club level, he played with Éire Óg and at inter-county level as a dual player with the Antrim senior teams.

== Career ==
Rice attended St Patrick's Christian Brothers School in Belfast and played both hurling and Gaelic football at all levels during his time there. He first played for the Éire Óg club at juvenile and underage levels, however, he won an Antrim MFC medal with the Pearses club in 1957 during a temporary transfer. Rice returned to Éire Óg and captained the minor team to the Antrim MFC title in 1960.

At inter-county level, Rice won consecutive Ulster MHC medals in 1959 and 1960, while he also lined out at minor level as a Gaelic footballer. He also made his Antrim senior football team debut in 1960. Rice won an Ulster JFC medal in 1963, before becoming one of the top scorers for the senior team. He was also a dual player at senior inter-county level and won an Ulster IHC medal in 1966.

Rice's club career continued long after his inter-county one had ended. He won Antrim JHC medals in 1967 and 1974. Rice also won an Antrim JFC medal in 1979.

== Death ==
Rice died on 29 June 2025, at the age of 83.

== Honours ==
Patrick Pearses

- Antrim Minor Football Championship: 1957

Éire Óg

- Antrim Junior Football Championship: 1979
- Antrim Junior Hurling Championship: 1967, 1974
- Antrim Minor Football Championship: 1960

Antrim

- Ulster Intermediate Hurling Championship: 1966
- Ulster Junior Football Championship: 1963
- Ulster Minor Hurling Championship: 1959, 1960
