= Frankie Wilson =

Antrim Gaelic footballer (1970–2022)

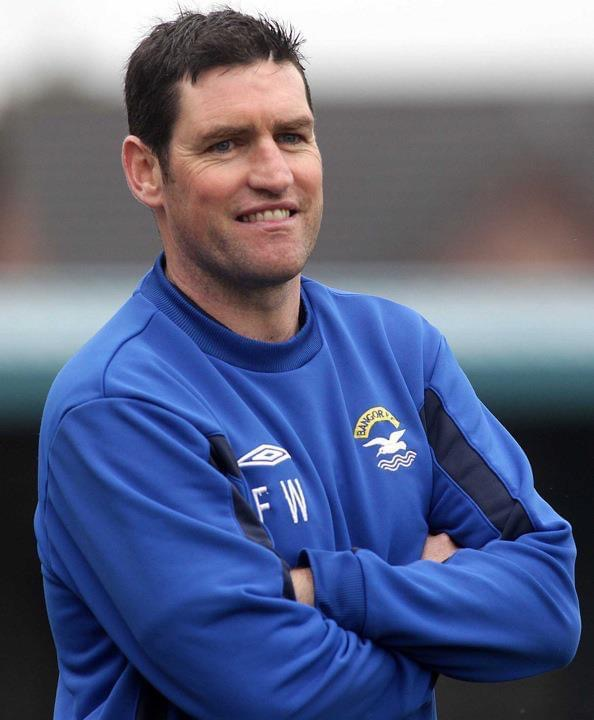

Personal information
- Native name: Prionsias Mac Liam (Irish)
- Born: 26 July 1970 Belfast, Northern Ireland
- Died: 28 October 2022 (aged 52) Belfast, Northern Ireland
- Occupation: PE teacher

Sport
- Sport: Gaelic football
- Position: Left wing-forward
Club
- Years: Club
- Lámh Dhearg
Club titles
- Antrim titles: 1
Inter-county
- Years: County
- 1992–2001: Antrim
Inter-county titles
- Ulster titles: 0
- All-Irelands: 0
- NFL: 0
- All Stars: 0

Francis Wilson (26 July 1970 – 28 October 2022) was an Irish gaelic footballer, association footballer and manager. During his playing days he lined out for several clubs, including Crewe United, Cliftonville and Omagh Town. He also represented Lámh Dhearg and the Antrim senior football team.

== Playing career ==
Wilson joined Lámh Dhearg as a 17-year-old and was part of the club's first ever Antrim MFC title-winning team in 1988. He won an Antrim SFC title in 1992. That same year Wilson was drafted onto the Antrim senior football team and lined out in the All-Ireland SBFC final defeat by Wicklow. Wilson continued to line out with Antrim for about a decade.

Wilson combined his Gaelic football career with that of a semi-professional footballer. Usually lining out at midfield, he played for Northern Ireland Football League clubs Crewe United, Cliftonville, Carrick Rangers, Ballyclare Comrades, Larne, Omagh Town and Bangor.

== Managerial career ==
Wilson returned to the Bangor as manager and guided the club to the Steel & Sons Cup in 2011. He also had spells as manager of Lurgan Celtic, Sport and Leisure Swifts and Banbridge Town. Wilson was also the long-serving manager of the Northern Ireland national under-18 schoolboys football team.

== Personal life and death ==
Wilson was a past pupil of Rathmore Grammar School. He worked as a teacher, where he was head of the PE department at Our Lady and St Patrick's College in Knock. He was diagnosed with terminal bile duct cancer in January 2022. Wilson died on 28 October 2022, at the age of 52.

== Honours ==
=== Player ===
Lámh Dhearg

- Antrim Senior Football Championship: 1992
- Antrim Minor Football Championship: 1988

=== Manager ===
Bangor

- Steel & Sons Cup: 2011
