= Declan Lynch (Gaelic footballer) =

Antrim Gaelic footballer and politician

Member of Lisburn and Castlereagh City Council
- Incumbent
- Assumed office 1 November 2024
- Preceded by: Paul Burke

Personal details
- Born: 1992 (age 33–34)
- Party: Sinn Féin

Declan Lynch (born 1992) is an Irish Sinn Féin politician and former Gaelic footballer who played for the Lámh Dhearg club and at senior level for the Antrim county team.

== Sporting career ==
He spent two years as Antrim county football captain under the management of Lenny Harbinson, before Peter Healy succeeded him in 2021 under Harbinson's successor Enda McGinley.

Lynch was educated at Bunscoil Phobal Féirste and Scoil Mhuire. He attended the University of Ulster, where he studied politics and criminology, and later completed a master's degree. He is a fluent speaker of the Irish language. After working for the Bank of Ireland, he became a political adviser.

Lynch has had surgery five times on his hips (twice on the right and three times on the left) over a period of seven years, after first injuring himself while playing for Antrim when he was 16. The first operation was done in 2012, also the year he made his Antrim senior debut. Lynch had mild symptoms of COVID-19 from which he recovered in mid-2020. His father Martin managed Lámh Dhearg to an Antrim Senior Football Championship in 2017.

He also plays hurling for the Lámh Dhearg club, winning the 2016 Antrim and Ulster Junior Hurling Championship, but he has since dedicated himself to football.

== Political career ==
Lynch was co-opted onto Lisburn and Castlereagh City Council in November 2024.

In June 2026, he was selected as the Sinn Féin candidate in Lagan Valley at the next Northern Ireland Assembly election.
