= Henry Musgrave =

Northern Irish businessman and philanthropist (1827–1922)

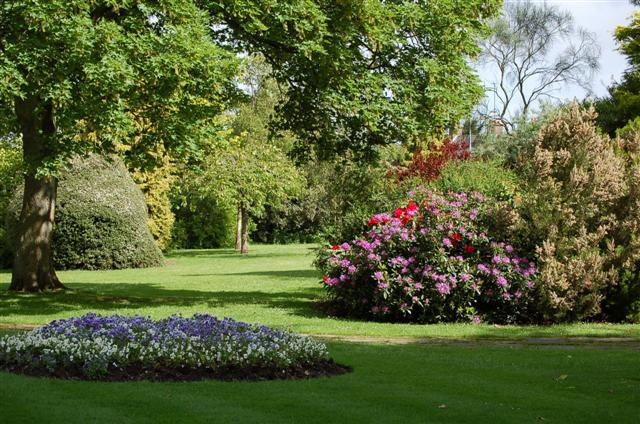
Musgrave Park, in the southwest of Belfast, named after Henry Musgrave.

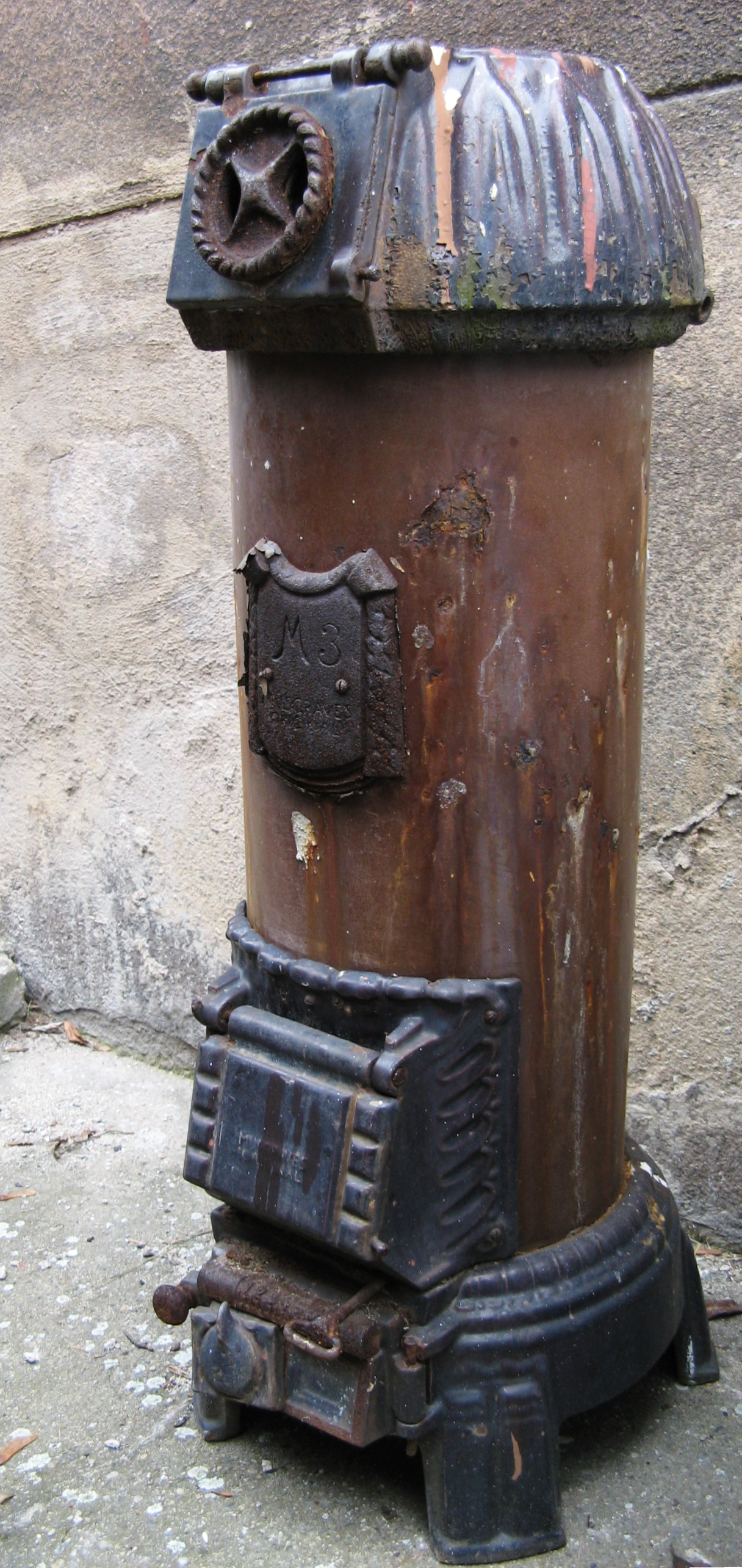
An M3 Musgraves Original cylindrical warm air stove. In 1891, production of Musgrave stoves in their Belfast factory was about 100 per week, and they were exported throughout Europe, with showrooms in Frankfurt and Paris.

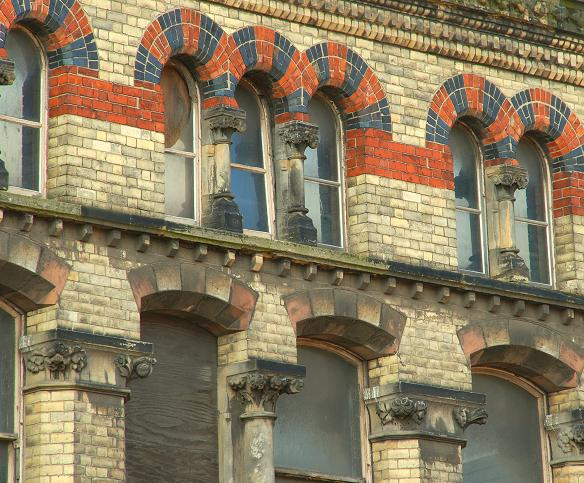
The former Riddel's Warehouse, Donegall Square, Belfast. The later Musgrave family businesses grew from this hardware concern, founded by Henry Musgrave's father-in-law, John Riddel.

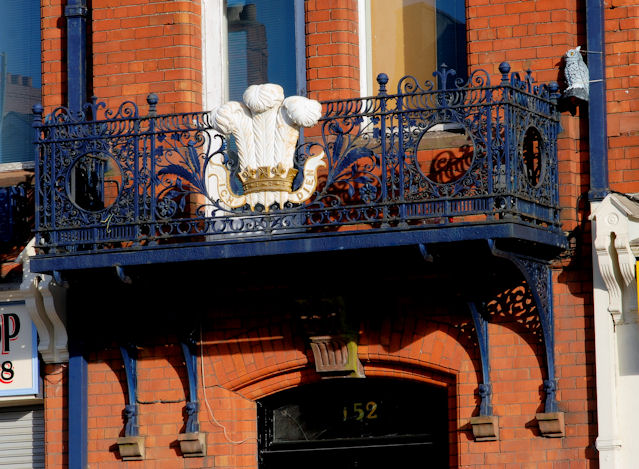
Detail of the Musgrave Mountpottinger Works on the Albertbridge Road, purpose-built in the 1890s to manufacture stoves, stable fittings, and convection fans, showing the Prince of Wales's feathers.

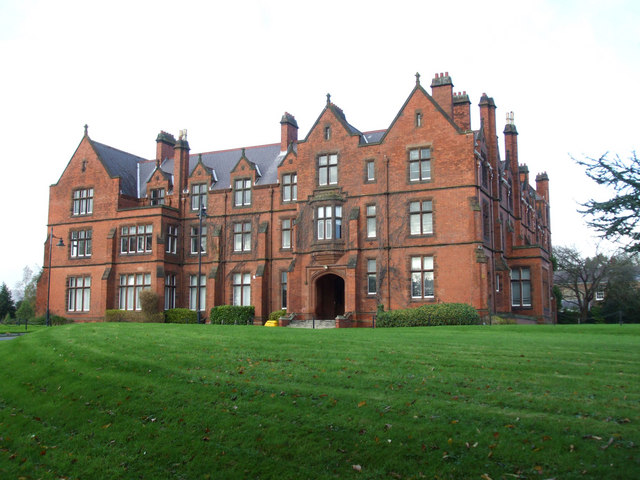
Riddel Hall, established in 1915 by Eliza and Isabella Riddel as a residence for female students at Queen's University, with Henry Musgrave as chair of the committee.

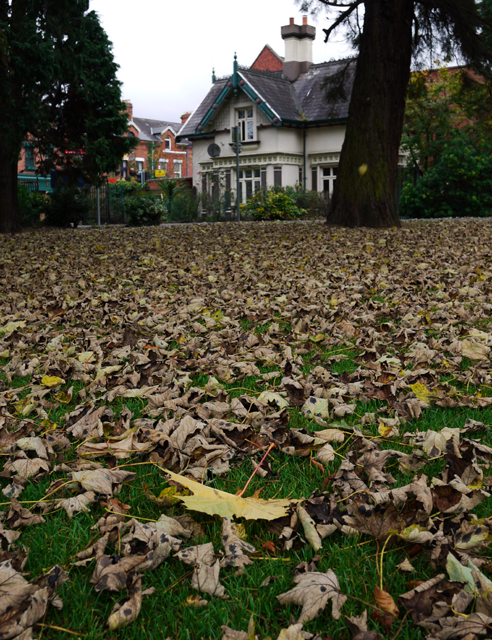
Drumglass Park, former garden of Henry Musgrave, bequeathed by him to the city, showing the former gatehouse to his home in the background.

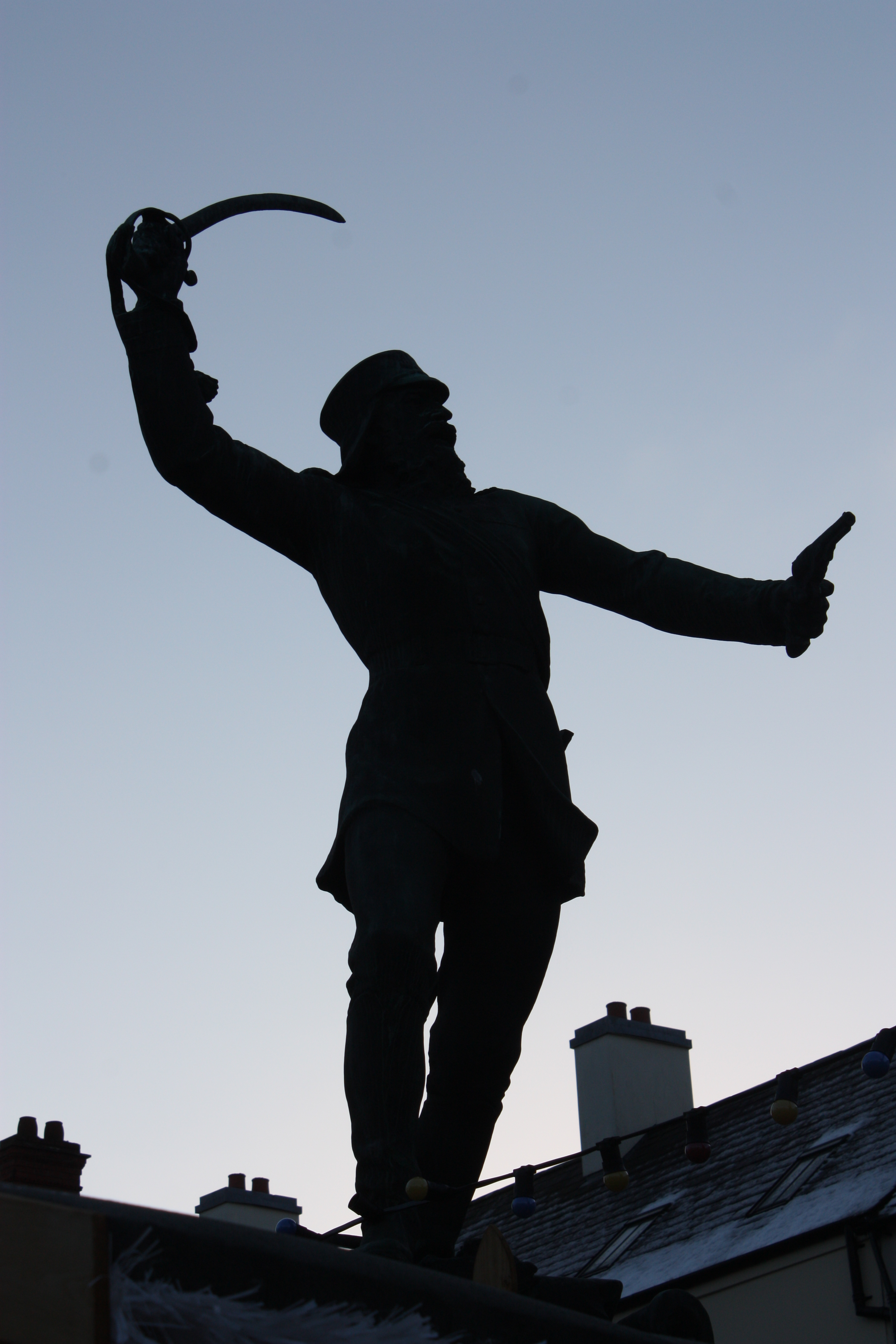
Musgrave had a statue erected to the soldier John Nicholson in Market Square, Lisburn, their hometown.

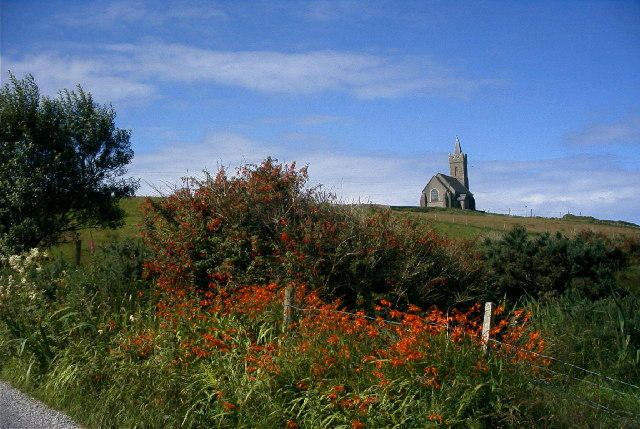
Church of Ireland church at Glencolumbkille. Henry Musgrave had the tower built in 1913.

Henry Musgrave (1827 – 2 January 1922), DL, was an Irish businessman and philanthropist.

He is perhaps best remembered for Musgrave Park in Belfast, which he donated to the city. His portrait hangs in the Examination Hall of Queen's University Belfast.

== Family ==
Henry Musgrave was the youngest of the nine sons and three daughters born to Dr Samuel Musgrave and Mary Musgrave. Originally from Edinburgh, Dr Musgrave (1767–1834) moved to Lisburn, County Down when he was about 20 to practice as a doctor and open a dispensary. It was here that Henry was born. His mother, Mary Musgrave, néé Riddel (1785–1862), was from Co Down and her family owned land near Comber. As a young man Samuel was involved with the United Irishmen and was imprisoned in 1796 for over a year on a charge of High Treason.

Mary's brother, John Riddel (also Riddle/Riddell) founded the firm Riddels, Hardware Merchants and Ironmongers, of Donegall Place, Belfast. It was this business from which the Musgrave family's ironworking concerns later developed which Henry Musgrave was to inherit.

Soon after the death of Henry's father, when Henry was seven, the family moved from Lisburn to Belfast. They first lived in Upper Arthur Street, then Donegall Square South and eventually built Drumglass House in Malone in 1855, which now serves as Victoria College, a girls' boarding school. In about 1882 the Musgraves built a gate lodge to the house in a Queen Anne style. The family monogram can still be seen above a doorway of this and on the gate pillars to Drumglass Park on Lisburn Road. In 1867 the family also bought an estate of 23,673 acres in Carrick, Co Donegal where they sometimes held shooting parties.

None of the Musgrave children went on to marry and Henry was the last of his siblings to survive, living to 95.

== Education ==
Musgrave was educated at the Royal Belfast Academical Institution and then served an apprenticeship with the tea and wine merchant William Finlay in Corporation Street.

== Business ==
In about 1850, Musgrave went into business with his brother Edgar to trade tea and sugar, founding H & E Musgrave, Ann Street, Belfast.

The novelist, Forrest Reid, was an apprentice as a young man in the firm and wrote, "Though generosity was not a Musgrave characteristic I liked Henry: towards his brother, Edgar, when I watched him saving the backs of envelopes and lifting little bits of string from the floor, my feeling was more of curiosity."

=== Musgrave & Co Ltd ===
During his lifetime, Musgrave acquired the interests of several businesses as he survived his older family members.

A particularly substantial concern was the ironworks of Messrs Musgrave & Co Ltd (previously Musgrave & Bros Hardware Merchants). This had been started by Musgrave's older brothers, Robert Hamilton Musgrave, John Riddel Musgrave and James Musgrave, in partnership with their uncle John Riddel. The business first appears in the Belfast Directory of 1843 – 1844, with an address of 99 High Street.

Musgrave & Co expanded, first by taking on extra premises at High Street, then new works at Ann Street, which included a foundry at Cromac. By the 1890s larger premises were needed and built at Mountpottinger.

During this period, the company supplied goods throughout Britain, Europe and the Americas. Customers included cattle barons in South America and members of European aristocracy such as Victoria, Princess Royal, Empress of Germany and Alfonso XIII of Spain. In 1890 they designed and supplied much of the ironwork for the parks in Dublin, including the bandstand in Phoenix Park.

By 1904, after his brother James Musgrave died, by then 1st Baronet, with Musgrave Channel in Belfast harbour named after him, Henry Musgrave became chairman and the last Musgrave family member on the board.

At this point, the company had agencies in most European countries. In 1910, they supplied warm air heating plant to the Empire Palace Theatre, Dublin and in the 1910s constructed an air washer for the Municipal Technical Institute of Belfast. In 1914 they exhibited in London at the Shipping, Engineering and Machinery Show, Olympia.

Henry Musgrave died in 1922. Four decades later, in 1965, Musgrave & Co was in such financial difficulties that the directors called an extraordinary meeting and announced their intention to liquidate, with a loss of 400 jobs, ending the story of a 120-year-old firm.

=== Other businesses ===
Other businesses that Henry Musgrave became chairman of during his lifetime included Messrs Riddels Ltd, Messrs John Riddel & Son Ltd, Messrs Murray Sons & Co Ltd, the Bloomfield Land and Building Company, the Carrickfergus Salt Mining Company and the Donegal Railway Company Ltd.

== Philanthropy ==
Musgrave was heavily involved in charity work, especially in his later years. His main interests were education and the Presbyterian Church and he mostly made donations in Belfast and near the family estate in Donegal.

When he died in 1922, a 'Notice of Charitable Bequests' from his will was published in The Belfast Gazette with gifts totalling over £100,000. £20,000 alone was left for the purchase of land and building of new national schools in Belfast.

=== Riddel Hall ===
Musgrave's maternal cousins, Eliza and Isabella Riddel, built Riddel Hall, which in 1915 was endowed by for the purposes of providing boarding for the education of women at Queen's University Belfast. Henry Musgrave was the chairman of its permanent committee.

=== Musgrave Park ===
In 1921 Musgrave donated land 2 km from his home to build Musgrave Park in south Belfast. The park underwent extensive landscaping and did not open to the public until two years after Musgrave's death, in 1924.

=== Drumglass Park ===
Drumglass Park (also locally known as Cranmore or Malborough Park) was formed from six acres of the private garden of the Musgrave family once attached to their home. Musgrave bequeathed the garden to the City of Belfast in his will under the condition it was to be used as a public park or children's playground. It was opened in 1924 by the Lady Mayoress of Belfast, Lady Turner.

Today, this small park's facilities includes a children's playground, a bandstand and public toilets.

=== Glencolumbkille Church Tower ===
In 1913, Henry Musgrave paid for a tower to be built on the Church of Ireland parish church at Glencolumbkille, near the family's country estate. He also left bequests to this church and Kilcar Parish Church in his will.

=== John Nicholson statue, Lisburn ===
Musgrave had a memorial erected to John Nicholson in Market Square, Lisburn, the birthplace of both. The statue stands outside the Linen Centre with the inscription 'the gift of Henry Musgrave Esq of this town to the memory of a great Ulster soldier'.

=== Scholarships at Queen's University, Belfast ===
Musgrave left funds in his will to support students at Queen's University, Belfast.

Following the example of his brother who founded the chair of pathology at Queen's University, then Queen's College, Belfast, preference for the Musgrave Scholarship is given to students in pathology. Musgrave also established a scholarship for languages, still ongoing.

Another provision in Musgrave's will allowed the purchase of four houses in a terrace on University Road, along with money from other donors. This established a hostel for male students known as 'Queen's Chambers', opposite Queen's University, which opened in 1936. These houses were demolished during construction of Queen's Student Union in the 1960s.

=== Other ===
Musgrave was also a governor of the Royal Belfast Academical Institution, his old school, a life governor of the Royal Victoria Hospital, and an active member of the Belfast Chamber of Commerce and the Royal Ulster Agricultural Society.

== Honours ==
On 1 March 1917, Musgrave was made an honorary burgess of the City of Belfast. He was also grand juror and High Sheriff of Donegal for 1909–10 and was made Deputy Lieutenant of both the City of Belfast and of Donegal.

== Representation in popular culture ==
A 2012 play, Ghosts of Drumglass, was performed in Drumglass Park as part of the 2012 Belfast Festival at Queen's, centring on the life of Henry Musgrave and the rest of the Musgrave family.
