= Lees baronets of South Lytchett Manor (1897) =

Escutcheon of the Lees baronets of South Lytchett Manor

The Lees Baronetcy, of South Lytchett Manor in the parish of Lytchett Minster in the County of Dorset, was created in the Baronetage of the United Kingdom on 13 February 1897 for Elliott Lees. He represented Oldham and Birkenhead in the House of Commons as a Conservative. The third Baronet was a Colonel in the Army. The fourth Baronet served as High Sheriff of Dorset in 1960.

== Lees baronets, of South Lytchett Manor (1897) ==
- Sir Elliott Lees, 1st Baronet, DSO (1860–1908)
- Sir Thomas Evans Keith Lees, 2nd Baronet (1886–1915)
- Sir John Victor Elliott Lees, 3rd Baronet DSO, MC (1887–1955)
- Sir Thomas Edward Lees, 4th Baronet (1925–2016)
- Sir Christopher James Lees, 5th Baronet (born 1952)

The heir apparent to the baronetcy is the current holder's eldest son John Austen Lees (born 1992).

== Notes ==
Baronetage of the United Kingdom
| Preceded by Uniacke-Penrose-Fitzgerald baronets | Lees baronets of South Lytchett Manor; 13 February 1897 | Succeeded by Powell baronets |
