= Powell baronets of Wimpole Street (1897) =

Escutcheon of the Powell baronets of Wimpole Street

The Powell baronetcy, of Wimpole Street in the Parish of St Marylebone in the County of London, was created in the Baronetage of the United Kingdom on 5 March 1897 for Richard Powell, physician in ordinary to Queen Victoria, Edward VII and George V and President of the Royal College of Physicians from 1905 to 1910.

The family surname is pronounced "Poel".

== Powell baronets, of Wimpole Street (1897) ==
- Sir Richard Douglas Powell, 1st Baronet (1842–1925)
- Sir Douglas Powell, 2nd Baronet (1874–1932)
- Sir Richard George Douglas Powell, 3rd Baronet (1909–1980)
- Sir Nicholas Folliott Douglas Powell, 4th Baronet (1935–2019)
- Sir James Richard Douglas Powell, 5th Baronet (born 1962)

The heir apparent is the present holder's son Douglas James Folliott Powell (born 1992).

== Notes ==
Baronetage of the United Kingdom
Preceded by Lees baronets	Powell baronets of Wimpole Street; 3 March 1897	Succeeded by Musgrave baronets
