= 2016 Fermanagh Senior Football Championship =

2016 Fermanagh SFC
Tournament details
- County: Fermanagh
- Province: Ulster
- Level: Senior
- Year: 2016
- Trophy: New York Cup
- Sponsor: Quinn Building Products
- Date: 27 August - 2 October 2016
- Teams: 8
- Defending champions: Derrygonnelly Harps

Winners
- Champions: Derrygonnelly Harps (5th win)
- Manager: Martin Greene
- Captain: Ryan Jones
- Qualify for: 2016 Ulster Club SFC

Runners-up
- Runners-up: Erne Gaels Belleek
- Manager: Maurice McLaughlin
- Captain: Ryan Lyons; Jack McCann

Promotion/Relegation
- Relegated team(s): Irvinestown St Molaise; St Patrick's Donagh

The 2016 Fermanagh Senior Football Championship was the 110th edition of the Fermanagh GAA's premier club Gaelic football tournament for senior clubs in County Fermanagh, Northern Ireland. The tournament consists of 8 teams, with the winner representing Fermanagh in the Ulster Senior Club Football Championship. The championship had a straight knock-out format.

Derrygonnelly Harps entered as defending champions after their victory over Roslea Shamrocks the previous year.

Derrygonnelly successfully defended their title after defeating Erne Gaels in the final by a point.

== Team changes ==
The following teams have changed division since the 2015 championship season.

=== To Championship ===
Promoted from 2015 Intermediate Championship

- Irvinestown St Molaise - (Intermediate Champions)
- Teemore Shamrocks - (Intermediate Runners-Up)

=== From Championship ===
Relegated to 2016 Intermediate Championship

- Derrylin O'Connells - (Relegation Play-off Losers)
- Tempo Maguires - (Relegation Play-off Losers)

== Bracket ==
Quarter-finals
Erne Gaels Belleek	3-16
Irvinestown St Molaise	2-10
Roslea Shamrocks	1-17
St Patrick's Donagh	0-17
Derrygonnelly Harps	1-14
Ederney St Joseph's	0-9
Devenish St Mary's	1-11
Teemores Shamrocks	0-11

Semi-finals
Erne Gaels Belleek	2-11
Roslea Shamrocks	1-6
Derrygonnelly Harps	2-13
Devenish St Mary's	0-9

Final
Erne Gaels Belleek	1-7
Derrygonnelly Harps	0-11

== Quarter-finals ==
All 8 teams enter the competition at this stage. The four winners progress to the semi-finals while the four losers enter the relegation semi-finals.

27 August 2016 Quarter-final	Erne Gaels Belleek	3-16 – 2-10	Irvinestown St Molaise	Derrygonnelly
17:30				Stadium: Canon Maguire Park; Referee: Noel Davis

27 August 2016 Quarter-final	Devenish St Mary's	1-11 – 0-11	Teemore Shamrocks	Derrygonnelly
19:00				Stadium: Canon Maguire Park; Referee: James Lewis

28 August 2016 Quarter-final	Roslea Shamrocks	1-17 – 0-17	St Patrick's Donagh	Enniskillen
13:30				Stadium: Brewster Park; Referee: Joseph Corcoran

28 August 2016 Quarter-final	Derrygonnelly Harps	1-14 – 1-9	Ederney St Joseph's	Enniskillen
15:00				Stadium: Brewster Park; Referee: Martin Higgins

== Semi-finals ==
11 September 2016 Semi-final	Erne Gaels Belleek	2-11 – 1-6	Roslea Shamrocks	Enniskillen
15:00				Stadium: Brewster Park; Referee: Eugene McDonagh

11 September 2016 Semi-final	Derrygonnelly Harps	2-13 – 0-9	Devenish St Mary's	Enniskillen
15:00				Stadium: Brewster Park; Referee: Ferghal Cleary

== Final ==
2 October 2016
16:15
Final

Erne Gaels Belleek	1-7 – 0-11	Derrygonnelly Harps
Seamus Ryder 0-5 (0-3f), Ryan Lyons 1-0, Barry McCann 0-1, Thomas McCaffrey 0-1 (0-1f)	Report	Paul Ward 0-4, Leigh Jones 0-2 (0-1f), Declan Cassidy 0-2, Neil Gallagher 0-1, Ryan Jones 0-1, Garvan Jones 0-1 (0-1f)

Brewster Park, Enniskillen
Referee: Noel Davis

== Relegation play-offs ==
10 September 2016 Relegation Final	Irvinestown St Molaise	0-9 – 1-12	Teemore Shamrocks	Derrylin
16:45				Stadium: O'Connell Park

10 September 2016 Relegation Final	Ederney St Joseph's	2-13 – 1-14	St Patrick's Donagh	Derrylin
18:15				Stadium: O'Connell Park
