= Musgrave Park, Belfast =

Park in Belfast, Northern Ireland

Coordinates: 54.56976°N 5.97394°W

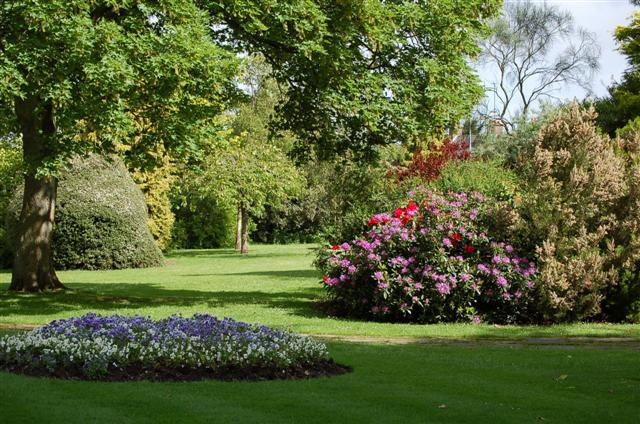
Spring bedding at Musgrave Park.

Musgrave Park is a public park in Belfast, Northern Ireland.

Situated in the south west of the city, in Ballygammon townland off Stockman's Lane, the surrounding area is a mix of trading estates and residential housing, with the M1 motorway passing close to one end.

Facilities include a bowling pavilion, playing fields, walks, nature areas and bottle banks. Since 2010, it has been developing a therapy garden. The adjoining Musgrave Park Hospital specialises in rehabilitation for all ages.

Grovelands, a smaller park running alongside and to the south, is connected to Musgrave by the main pathway which runs through both.

== Gift by Henry Musgrave ==
The land on which Musgrave Park was built was donated to Belfast in 1921 by Henry Musgrave (1827–1922). It was another three years before the park was open to the public. 250 gardeners worked during this time to landscape the ground, as part of a job creation scheme.

The park was opened in 1924 by Lady Edith Dixon, who was later herself to donate Sir Thomas and Lady Dixon Park to the city.

The Musgrave family made their fortune in great part through the Ulster Convector Stove, used for heating and ventilation processes worldwide during the 19th and 20th centuries. The Musgraves were a philanthropic family and the park is not the only landmark that bears their name. Musgrave Channel in Belfast harbour is named in honour of a brother of Henry Musgrave, Sir James Musgrave, who was chairman of Belfast Harbour Board. Sir James also founded the chair of pathology at Queen's College, Belfast, now Queen's University.

Henry was the longest living son of the Musgraves. Out of twelve children, none of whom married, he was the last to survive, and he spent much of his later years involved in charitable works. He was a governor of the Royal Belfast Academical Institution, a life governor of the Royal Victoria Hospital, an active member of the Belfast Chamber of Commerce and the Royal Ulster Agricultural Society. He left bequests to support students at Queen's University, especially those studying pathology, with awards such as the Musgrave Scholarship, which are still ongoing. His portrait hangs in the Examination Hall of Queen's University.

As well as donating Musgrave Park, when Henry Musgrave died on 2 January 1922, he bequeathed his own garden to Belfast Corporation, now Belfast City Council, so that it could be made into a children's play park, Drumglass Park on the Lisburn Road, approximately 1.2 miles to the north east of Musgrave Park.

== Sporting facilities ==
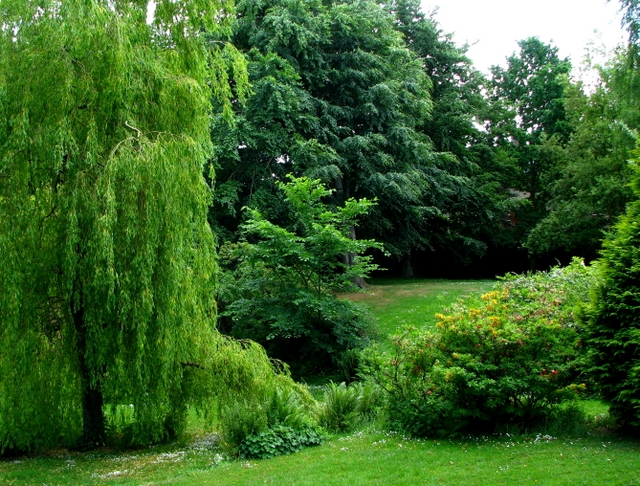
A willow tree grows in the former boating pond, now drained, at Grovelands Park.

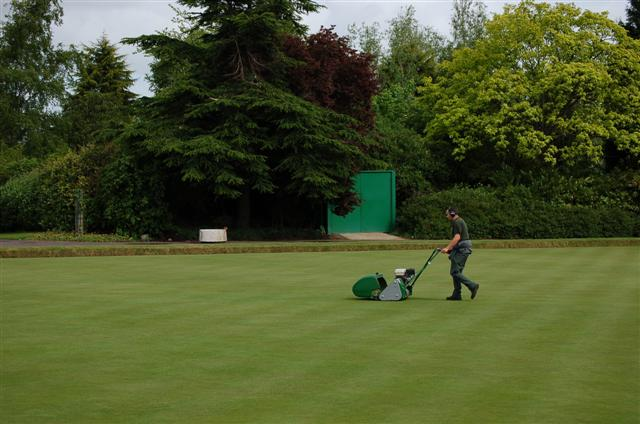
Cutting the bowling greens at the park, one of the earliest features to be built.

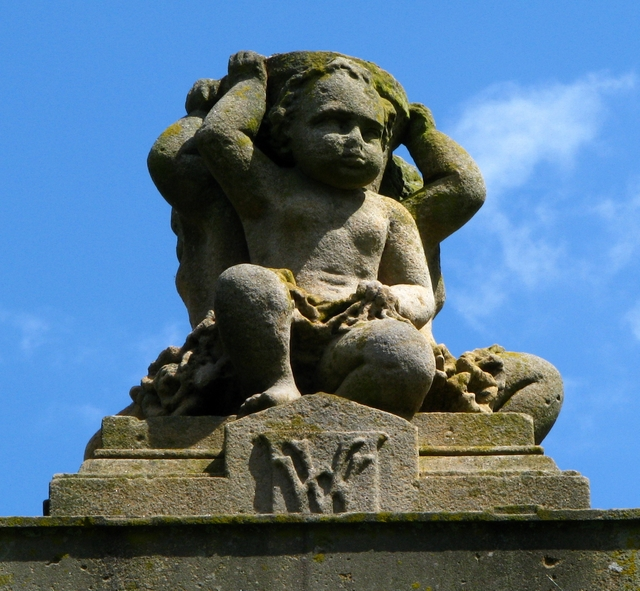
Detail of the top of the gate pier near Grovelands' entrance, to the designs of Irish architect W. J. Barre.

The first bowling green was built in the park in 1926. Today there are two greens and a pavilion. Musgrave Park Lawn Bowls Club is based here, part of the Northern Ireland Bowling Association, and during the summer there are regular tournaments. The pavilion offers indoor bowling for casual play during the close season.

Since 2008, Musgrave Park has offered pitches for Gaelic football, hurling and camogie. These are managed in association with St Brigid's Gaelic Athletic Club. In their Investment Programme 2012-1015 Belfast City Council planned to build changing facilities.

There are six tarmac tennis courts, of which in 2012 two were playable, with plans to upgrade all of them.

== History of use ==
In 1926, along with the bowling green, a putting green was built which no longer remains. There was also a recreational pond in Grovelands.

During World War II, allotments were dug in Musgrave Park to aid wartime food production. The iron railings around the park were also taken away to be melted for scrap metal. Only the gates were left. New railings around the park have been built since.

In 2012, allotments were once again created in Musgrave Park, opposite the bowling pavilion. There is no legal requirement to supply allotments in Northern Ireland, as is the case in England, but there is public demand. Most allotment sites have waiting lists and Belfast City Council already notes a waiting time for these new plots.

== Grovelands ==
During the 1970s, an area of Musgrave Park was sectioned off for the use of horticultural apprentices. Today this section is once more open to the general public. Although no longer a training ground, it is notable for its attractive gardens.

On the inside of the entrance to Grovelands stands a stone pillar from the 1860s, constructed to the designs of William Barre. Originally a gate pier, it previously controlled entrance to one of the most exclusive roads in Belfast at Fortwilliam Park. Now it is a feature of the ornamental planting.

== Therapy garden ==
Since 2010, work has been ongoing to create a therapeutic garden, with funding from the European Union's European Regional Development Fund - Peace III. Local schoolchildren were consulted in the design. By 2012, a willow tunnel, disabled access plant beds as part of a community garden and a multi-sensory 'whispering wall' had been created.

== See also ==
- List of parks and gardens in Belfast
