= James Loughrey =

Irish Gaelic footballer

Personal information
- Nickname: Locky
- Born: 10 September 1986 (age 40) Belfast, County Antrim; Northern Ireland
- Occupation: Accountant
- Height: 6 ft 0 in (183 cm)

Sport
- Sport: Gaelic Football
- Position: Right corner-back
Clubs
- Years: Club
- St Brigid's; Mallow; Avondhu
Club titles
- Cork titles: 0
College
- Years: College
- 2005-2009: Queen's University Belfast
College titles
- Sigerson titles: 1
Inter-county*
Years	County	Apps (scores)
2007-2012 2013-2021	Antrim; Cork	16 (1-10); 18 (0-06)
Inter-county titles
- Munster titles: 0
- All-Irelands: 0
- NFL: 0
- All Stars: 0
- *Inter County team apps and scores correct as of 13:30, 1 July 2017.

James Loughrey (born 10 September 1986) is a Gaelic footballer who plays as a right corner-back at senior level for the Cork county team.

Born in Belfast, Loughrey was educated at Our Lady and St Patrick's College, Knock where he played basketball. He later joined the St Brigid's club, where he first played competitive Gaelic football. Loughrey won junior and intermediate championship medals with the club, before transferring to the Mallow club in 2013. He has also lined out with divisional side Avondhu.

During his studies at Queen's University Belfast, Loughrey was a regular on the university's Gaelic football team. He won a Sigerson Cup medal as a member of the panel in 2007.

Loughrey made his debut on the inter-county scene when he first linked up with the Antrim under-21 team. After little success in this grade, he went on to make his senior debut during the 2007 championship. He was a regular member of the starting fifteen for six seasons and was an Ulster runner-up in 2009. Loughrey transferred to Cork in 2013.

== Honours ==
Queen's University Belfast

- Sigerson Cup (1): 2007

St Brigid's

- Antrim Junior Football Championship (1): 2004
- Antrim Intermediate Football Championship (1): 2006

Mallow

- Cork Premier Intermediate Football Championship (1): 2017

Cork

- McGrath Cup (2): 2014, 2016

Ulster

- Railway Cup (1): 2012
