= Éire Óg Derriaghy GAC =

Antrim-based Gaelic games club

Éire Óg Doire Achaidh GAC
- Founded: 1932
- County: Antrim
- Nickname: The Ogs
- Colours: Red and white
- Grounds: Woodlands, Finaghy Road North, Belfast

Playing kits
Standard colours	Change Kit

Senior Club Championships
	All Ireland	Ulster champions	Antrim champions
Football:	0	0	1

Éire Óg Derriaghy GAC (Irish: Éire Óg Doire Achaidh GAC) is a Gaelic Athletic Association club from the outskirts of Dunmurry, County Antrim, Northern Ireland. Founded in 1932, and playing out of Woodlands Playing Fields, Éire Óg Doire Achaidh is the local club for the parishes of St Anne's and Our Lady Queen of Peace, providing Gaelic football and Hurling teams for the children of Derriaghy, Finaghy, Dunmurry, Black's Road, Glengoland and Cloona. The club has teams from Primary 1 level all the way through to senior level.

== History ==
In 1948 Éire Óg won their only Senior Football Championship title to date. After beating Ardoyne and Dunloy GAC, Éire Óg knocked out the holders, O’Connell’s, in the semi-final winning 1-7 to 1-3, despite a late comeback by O’Connell’s. The winning Ógs team was a very young team - only five of them being over 21 years of age.

Éire Óg has contributed many county footballers and hurlers. 1951 was the last year that Antrim won the Ulster Senior Football Championship. Éire Óg had five representatives in the team - Jimmy Roe, Brian O'Kane, Peter O'Hara and Donagh Forde all started, while David O'Kane was one of the substitutes. Jimmy Roe, Brian O’Kane and Peter O’Hara would go on to start against Meath in the All Ireland semi-final at Croke Park, but Antrim unfortunately lost 2-06 to 1-07.

Brian O’Kane’s brother, Hugh, also played senior county football and was the captain of the first ever Queen's University Belfast team to lift the Sigerson Cup. The Ógs also had an international soccer player in their team. Tommy Forde played for the Northern Ireland national football team throughout the 1950s as well as playing football for Éire Óg.

== Honours ==
- Antrim Senior Football Championship
  - 1948
- Antrim Intermediate Football Championship
  - 1985
- Antrim Junior Football Championship
  - 1938
  - 1979
  - 2001
- Antrim Intermediate Hurling Championship
  - 1937
  - 1952
- Antrim Junior Hurling Championship
  - 1932
  - 1951
  - 1967
  - 1974

=== Notable players ===
- Tommy Rice - Antrim Hurling Player in 1939.
- Peter McGarvey - Antrim Hurling Player in 1939.
- Jimmy Roe - Antrim Football Player who won the 1951 Ulster Senior Football Championship.
- Brian O’Kane - Antrim Football Player who won the 1951 Ulster Senior Football Championship.
- Peter O'Hara - Antrim Football Player who won the 1951 Ulster Senior Football Championship.
- Donagh Forde - Antrim Football Player who won the 1951 Ulster Senior Football Championship.
- David O'Kane - Antrim Football Player who won the 1951 Ulster Senior Football Championship.
- Hugh O'Kane - Captain of the first ever Queen's University team to lift the Sigerson Cup.
- Tommy Forde - Northern Ireland International Soccer Player.
