= Sir James Musgrave, 1st Baronet =

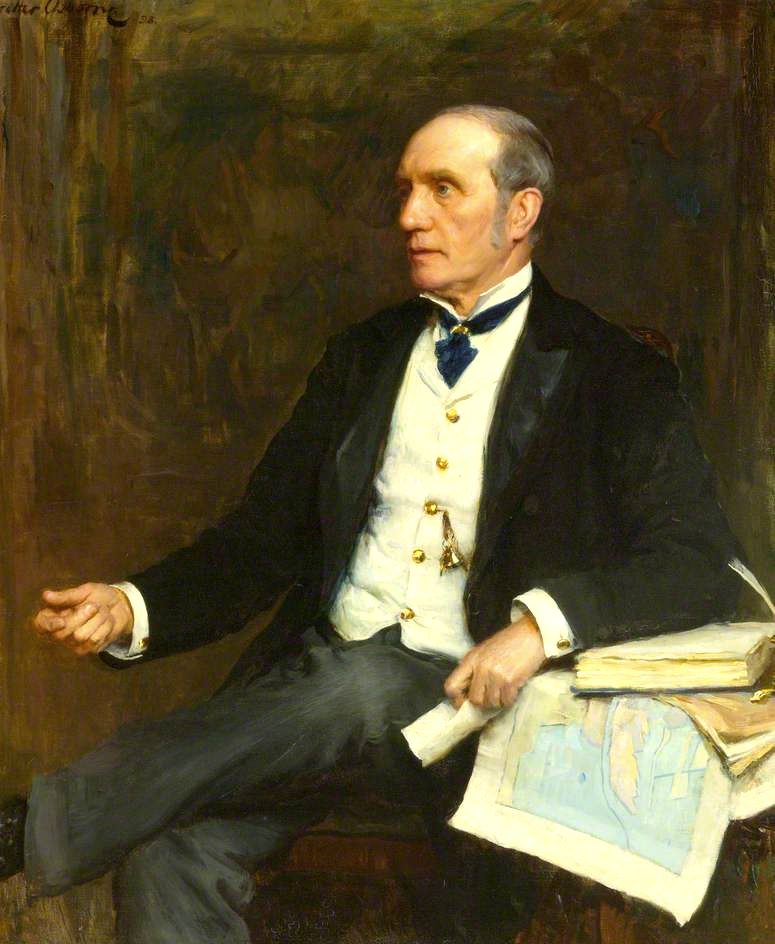
Sir James Musgrave, 1898 portrait

Sir James Musgrave, 1st Baronet (1826–1904) was an Irish industrialist with the Belfast iron and engineering firm Musgrave Brothers.

== Life ==
Born at Lisburn, County Antrim, on 30 December 1826, he was seventh of nine sons of Dr. Samuel Musgrave (1770–1836), a physician there, and his wife Mary (d. 1862), daughter of William Riddel of Comber. Musgrave's father, a supporter of the United Irishmen, was imprisoned in Kilmainham Gaol in 1796, and released in 1798; and again imprisoned in 1803.

After attending local schools and receiving private tuition, James Musgrave went into business in Belfast. With his brothers John Riddel Musgrave and Robert Musgrave, he set up the firm of Musgrave Brothers, iron founders.

On 4 March 1897 Musgrave was created a baronet, of Drumglass.

Escutcheon of the Musgrave baronets of Drumglass

== Interests ==
In the public life of Belfast, Musgrave was in 1876 elected one of the Belfast harbour commissioners. From 1887 to 1903 he was harbour chairman, succeeding Edward Harland, overseeing a period of expansion.

Musgrave was the moving spirit in the establishment of the Belfast Technical School, supported the building of the Royal Victoria Hospital, Belfast, in commemoration of the jubilee of Queen Victoria, and founded in 1901 the Musgrave chair of pathology in Queen's College, Belfast. He was a member of the Recess Committee on Irish agriculture.

== County Donegal ==
In 1866 Musgrave and his brother John purchased an estate of some 60,000 acres (24,000 ha) in County Donegal. During part of every year he resided there, at Carrick Lodge, Glencolumbkille. He was appointed J.P. and D.L. of Donegal, and served as High Sheriff 1885-6. He was involved in setting up the Donegal Railway Company, and became its chairman.

== Death and memorial ==
Musgrave died unmarried at Drumglass House, his Belfast home, on 22 February 1904, and was buried in the cathedral churchyard of Lisburn Cathedral. A stained-glass window to his memory, and to that of other members of the family, was installed in the First Lisburn presbyterian church.

== Notes ==
Baronetage of the United Kingdom
Preceded by Powell baronets	Musgrave baronets of Drumglass; 4 March 1897	Succeeded by Baird baronets
