= Lámh Dhearg GAC =

Antrim-based Gaelic games club

- Lámh Dhearg CLG
- Founded: 1903
- County: Antrim
- Nickname: The Lámhs/ Hannahstown
- Colours: White and Red with red hand badge
- Grounds: Páirc Lámh Dhearg
- Coordinates: 54°35′17.84″N 6°02′17.47″W

Playing kits
Home Kit	Change Kit

Senior Club Championships
	All Ireland	Ulster champions	Antrim champions
Football:	-	-	3

Location of Lámh Dhearg GAC in Belfast

Lámh Dhearg (Irish pronunciation: [ˌl̪ˠaːw ˈjaɾˠəɡ]; English approximation: /lɑːv ˈjærəɡ/) is a Gaelic Athletic Association club based on the Upper Springfield Road in west Belfast, County Antrim, Northern Ireland. It was established in 1903 and plays Gaelic football, ladies' Gaelic football, handball, and hurling.

== Lámh Dhearg ==
The club's name means "Red Hand" in Irish, referring to the traditional symbol of Ulster. Its supporters use the motto Lámh Dhearg Abú, an old war-cry meaning "the Red Hand forever".

=== Honours ===
- Ulster Junior Club Hurling Championship (1)
  - 2016
- Antrim Intermediate Hurling Championship (1)
  - 2011
- Antrim Junior Hurling Championship (2)
  - 1972, 2016
- Ulster Minor Club Football Championship (1)
  - 2010
- Antrim Senior Football Championship (4)
  - 1929, 1971, 1992, 2017
- Antrim Football League Division 1 (5)
- Antrim Football League Division 2 (1)
- Antrim Football League Division 3 (1)
- Antrim Football League Division 4 (3)
- Antrim Minor Football Championship (3)
  - 1986, 1992, 2010
- Antrim Minor Hurling Championship (1)
  - 1992
- Antrim Minor Football League (3)
- Antrim Intermediate Hurling Championship (2)
- Antrim Hurling League Division 2 (1)
  - 2006
- Antrim Hurling League Division 4 (1)
  - 2021
- Ulster Minor Hurling Sevens (1)
- Ulster GAA writers Club of the Year (1)
  - 1992

== Notable players ==
- Paddy Cunningham
- Declan Lynch, captained Antrim
- John Finucane
- Frankie Wilson
