= All Saints GAC =

Antrim-based Gaelic games club

- CLG Na Naoimh Uile
- Founded: 1975
- County: Antrim
- Nickname: The Saints
- Colours: Black and white
- Grounds: Slemish Park

Playing kits
Home Kit	Change Kit

All Saints Gaelic Athletic Club (Irish: CLG Na Naoimh Uile) is the only Gaelic Athletic Association club in the town of Ballymena, County Antrim, Northern Ireland. The club is a member of the South-West Antrim division of Antrim GAA, and competes in Gaelic football, hurling, Ladies Gaelic football and camogie.

== History ==
Gaelic games have had a somewhat difficult history in Ballymena, a town with a substantial Protestant and unionist majority, whereas the GAA has traditionally drawn its support from the mainly Catholic nationalist community. The unionist-controlled local authority became involved in a protracted dispute with the present club soon after its establishment in 1975. The council not only blocked access to public playing fields but attempted to prevent the club acquiring its own grounds. The club is also among the many GAA clubs in Northern Ireland that have been the subject of arson attacks attributed to loyalist elements.

The first Ballymena GAA club, McCracken's (named after the United Irishmen leader Henry Joy McCracken), was formed in 1924 but went out of existence in 1925. It was reformed in 1945, one of the prime movers being Jack O'Doherty, a native of County Armagh who had played football for Antrim, Armagh and Derry. McCracken's finally went out of existence in 1950. Another club, St Patrick's GAC, was founded in 1959, but lasted only until 1963. In 1965, All Saints GAC made its first appearance. With the onset of The Troubles, this club was wound up at the end of the decade.

The present club was established in 1975, initially as the All Saints Gaelic Athletic and Camogie Club. From the outset it catered for hurling and camogie, adding football in 1976. The present name, omitting "and Camogie", was adopted in 1978. After some early successes with juvenile teams, and having fielded its first Senior team in 1978, the club was named Antrim Club of the Year in 1979.

== Gaelic football ==
All Saints currently compete in the Antrim Intermediate Football Championship, and in Division 2 of the All-County Football League. The Saints have won three County Intermediate Football Championships, the first coming in 1986, then another two in 2008 and 2011. In 2011, the club went on to reach the semi-final of the Ulster Intermediate Club Football Championship, only to lose out after extra time to Culloville of Armagh.

=== Honours ===
- Antrim Intermediate Football Championship: (4)
  - 1986, 2008, 2011, 2024

=== Notable players ===
- Timmy Connolly, played for Antrim as well as representing Tír Chonaill Gaels (London) in the All-Ireland Senior Club Football Championships
- Paddy Logan, member of the Antrim panel that reached the 2007 Tommy Murphy Cup Final at Croke Park
- The McCann family have been a stronghold in the All Saints Club over the years, with brothers Gerald, Barney, Peter and Paul, all having played Senior inter-county football for Antrim. Peter McCann was a member of the 2000 panel that won the All Ireland 'B' Football Championship.
- Sean McVeigh, member of the 2007 Tommy Murphy Cup final panel; captained the London team in their first Championship win in 34 years (v Fermanagh, 25 June 2011); re-joined Antrim senior panel in 2013
- Peter McNicholl, joined the Antrim senior panel in 2013

== Hurling ==
All Saints compete in the Antrim Junior Hurling Championship, and in Division 4 of the county Hurling League.

The club has yet to win any county title, but has had a number of representatives on the County Junior Hurling team, County Minor B (South West teams) and various Development Squads. Some of those involved to date are Christopher McAffee, Damien Kelly, Liam Cassely, Enda Casey, Conrad Butcher, Peter Butcher, Aiden O'Kane, Paul Scullion, Christopher Downey, Ciaran Cassely and Damien Gillan.

== Ladies' Gaelic football ==
All Saints Ladies were among the first clubs to compete in County Antrim Ladies' Gaelic Football Board competitions, in an amalgamation in 1995 and their own right in 1996, Reformed 2018 and now playing in Division 2 Antrim LGFA.

=== Honours ===
- Antrim Junior Ladies' Championship
  - Runners-up 2004

== Camogie ==
The All Saints Camogie Club has been organised separately since 1978, while sharing facilities. The All Saints Camógs won the county league Division 3 in 1979.

== Culture ==
Since its foundation in 1975 the All Saints club has been active in promoting the Irish language and céilí dancing. It has participated in the GAA's Scór competitions, winning county, Ulster and All-Ireland titles within three years of its foundation. In 2011 the club hosted the 107-year-old Feis na nGleann sporting and cultural festival, the first occasion on which the Feis was held in Ballymena.

== Facilities ==
The original McCracken's played in a field on the Deerfin Road, in Crebilly townland, and the reformed 1940s team in a field at Caugherty Road. St Patrick's also played at Caugherty Road. The 1965–68 All Saints used a pitch at St Patrick's School, as did the revived club until it rented parish lands at Hugomont.

As this field was of very poor quality, and to meet increased demand, the club applied in 1976 to Ballymena Borough Council for the use of civic land, but was rejected nem. con. A Democratic Unionist Party (DUP) councillor objected to the GAA's goals of promoting Irish games, language and culture, to the then Rule 21 ban on participation in GAA sports by members of the crown forces, and to the requirement that the Irish tricolour – "a foreign flag" – be flown during matches. The councillor suggested that the real purpose of the club was to create disharmony within the community. The council also repeatedly refused to publicise the club's matches because they were played on the Sabbath, and refused to publish any material containing Irish-language text.

The club, having failed to persuade the council to engage with it, took the matter in 1977 to the Commissioner for Complaints, alleging sectarian and political bias on the part of the council. The Commissioner, Stephen McGonagle, upheld the club's complaints, holding that the council's "high-handed and arbitrary action" amounted to discrimination and maladministration.

Having been denied access to publicly owned playing grounds, the club was obliged to purchase its own ground, and in late 1978 it agreed the purchase of an 11-acre site at Crebilly and submitted a planning application. The council, and local MP Ian Paisley, objected to the application, and a public inquiry was eventually convened in 1980. Those submitting formal objections included Mid-Antrim Unionist Association, two Orange lodges, Ballymena Black Chapter, and the local Free Presbyterian Church. Although the council backed down at the last minute, the inquiry found against the club, which appealed. In 1981 a Northern Ireland Office junior minister (the region then being under direct rule) over-ruled the inquiry and granted planning permission to the club. The minister, David Mitchell, attended a meeting of Ballymena Borough Council to explain his decision, but on a vote was asked to leave. After a delay in the release of grant-aid, the All Saints club was finally able to complete the purchase in 1982.

The Crebilly grounds, at Woodside Road, were developed over the following years and were formally opened, as Slemish Park, in 1987. In 1994–95 the club added a two-storey pavilion, built mostly with voluntary labour. In August 1996, the new premises were attacked by arsonists, but they were restored and formally opened by the then President of the GAA, Jack Boothman, in February 1997. Over the next few years the pitches were improved with drainage and floodlighting.
