= St Brigid's GAC (Antrim) =

Antrim-based Gaelic games club

- CLG Naomh Bríd Béal Feirste
- Founded: 1998
- County: Antrim
- Colours: White, Blue and Yellow
- Grounds: Musgrave Park, Belfast
- Coordinates: 54°34′16.61″N 5°58′34.00″W

Playing kits
Home Kit	Change Kit

Senior Club Championships
	All Ireland	Ulster champions	Antrim champions
Football:	-	-	1

Location of St Brigids GAC in Belfast

St Brigid's Gaelic Athletic Club (Irish: Cumann Lúthchleas Gael Naomh Bríd, Béal Feirste) is a Gaelic Athletic Association club from the Malone Road area in Belfast, County Antrim, Northern Ireland. It was founded in 1998 by Dermot Dowling and Conor McSherry in the parish hall of St Brigid's Church. There was a strong need for a local GAA club to be set up as there were a huge potential number of people keen to get into the GAA in the Malone area.

== History ==
The club has teams participating in Ladies GAA, Hurling & Football. The Senior football team participate in the ACL Division 1 and Senior Championship. In 2007, the club fielded their first senior hurling team and won their 1st underage football championship against Gort na Móna at Under-14 level.

In 2008 they saw the opening of Musgrave Park, by former GAA President Nicky Brennan.

In 2026, they won their first ever Antrim Senior Football Championship title, against O'Donovan Rossa on a scoreline of 0-21 to 1-16.

== Notable players ==
=== Senior inter-county players ===
==== Men's Gaelic football ====
Antrim

- James Loughrey, Deaghlan O'Hagan, Mark Sweeney, Ryan Daly, Dara Edwards, Patrick Finnegan, Ronan Boyle, Joseph Finnegan, Jack Dowling, Oran Downey, James Smith, John Morgan

Cork

- James Loughrey

Derry

- Shea Downey
- Matthew Downey

Tyrone

- Cathal Conway
