= Kickhams GAC Creggan =

Antrim-based Gaelic games club

- Founded: 1924
- County: Antrim
- Colours: Green and gold
- Grounds: Pairc Ciceam

Playing kits
Home Kit	Change Kit

Senior Club Championships
	All Ireland	Ulster champions	Antrim champions
Football:	-	-	3
Camogie:	-	2	9

Kickhams GAC Creggan, founded in 1924, is a Gaelic Athletic Association club from Creggan, County Antrim, Northern Ireland. The club provides Gaelic football, hurling, camogie and ladies football for all age groups from under-10s to senior level.

Creggan host the annual Ulster U21 Club Football Tournament which runs from January to March and is contested by the nine Ulster county champions. The winners receive the Paddy McLarnon Cup.

== Peadar Heffron ==
Peadar Heffron played both Gaelic football and hurling for the club and twice helped the club to the Antrim Intermediate Hurling Championship title. In an interview with the Sunday Independent, he stated that "his club turned their back on him as he announced plans to join the newly-formed PSNI in 2002." In 2010 Heffron was seriously injured, losing his right leg, when a dissident republican bomb was detonated under his car. Two club committee members who visited Heffron's parents while he was in a coma said "we are not here to represent the club, we are only here in a personal capacity?". The Club refused to comment.

== Honours ==
- Antrim Senior Football Championship (3)
  - 1943, 1954, 2021
- Ulster Senior Club Camogie Championship (2)
  - 1973, 1976
- Antrim Senior Camogie Championship (9)
  - 1932, 1933, 1934, 1935, 1936, 1970, 1973, 1976, 1980
