= Erin's Own GAC, Cargin =

Antrim-based Gaelic games club

- Clann na hÉireann CLG, Carraigín
- Founded: 1923
- County: Antrim
- Nickname: The Emmet Band
- Colours: Green and white
- Grounds: Shore Road, Toome
- Coordinates: 54°44′56″N 6°27′29″W

Playing kits
Home Kit	Change Kit

Senior Club Championships
	All Ireland	Ulster champions	Antrim champions
Football:	0	0	13

Erin's Own Gaelic Athletic Club, Cargin is a sports club based in Toome, County Antrim, Northern Ireland. It competes in the Antrim leagues and championships of the Gaelic Athletic Association, in Gaelic football and camogie. Erin's Own provide Men's football (GAA), Ladies football (LGFA) and Camogie at all grades and age levels from Nursery to Senior level as well as Handball

== History ==
Erin's Own Cargin, (Clann na hÉireann, Carraigín) based in Toome, Co Antrim, in the Parish of Duneane, was founded in 1923 on the Shore Road, Toome by a Priest from Tyrella, Ballykinlar, Co. Down called Fr Dan Magennis. Fr Magennis was a young curate at the Sacred Heart Church, Cargin and was heavily involved in sports around the area, ensuring the Toome Carnival was a huge success.

The club prides itself as a key member of the communities around the Feevagh, welcoming those of all faiths, backgrounds, ethnicities and persuasions with a large emphasis on the ideals of the Society of United Irishmen. It was one of the pioneer clubs who started the SW Antrim football and hurling leagues in 1924. This was the culmination of events and local groups leading from the Famine times coming together in an act of solidarity following the partition of Ireland. It was nicknamed 'The Emmet Band' after a local Irish Republican Fenian organisation called the Cargin Robert Emmet Band which had been formed in the 1870s, with leaders such as Neal O'Boyle, and of whom a large proportion formed the first Cargin team.

Erin's Own were one of the first clubs in Ireland formed during the turbulent period after the partition of the country and the erection of a border between the Irish Free State and the new Northern Government. Erin's Own was a key part of ensuring the social bonds of the people in the area were kept intact. Clann na hÉireann means 'The Children of Ireland' which was a declaration that the people of Cargin would always be 'of Ireland', regardless of Partition or Government.

Another GAA club formed in Toome in 1926 called Lámh Dhearg, also from the encouragement of Fr Magennis, and who won the 1929 Antrim Senior Football Championship but eventually folded, the majority of its members then joining Cargin.

Cargin have played in the Senior football championship since 1953 following their Junior Championship win of that year. In the same year they took the opportunity to play on McCann Fields on the Shore Road in Toome and since then have been a Senior club continuously. Previous to that Cargin played their games in a number of townlands across the parish including Aghacarnaghan, Lismacloskey, Toome, Carlane, Cargin and Ballynamullan.

The Erin's Own club played the first "official" games of rounders in Ireland in June 1958 and were instrumental in its promotion. The club continues to offer a sporting and social outlet for the community ensuring healthy lifestyles and positive attitudes.

The club's first Antrim Senior Football Championship arrived in 1974, following a victory over Sarsfields, Belfast in Casement Park. Cargin are now a 4-code club with Football, LGFA, Camogie and Handball all represented. The club remains at the cultural heart of the Toome community.

In December 2024, the club released its Centenary book, documenting the rich history of Toome and the surrounding parish, the Gaelic Revival period, Irish War of Independence and the GAA in Duneane. The 560 page book was titled 'Clann na hÉireann: 100 years of Pride and Passion'.

== Honours ==
- Antrim Senior Football Championship (13)
  - 1974, 1995, 1999, 2000, 2006, 2015, 2016, 2018, 2019, 2020, 2022, 2023, 2024
- Antrim Intermediate Football Championship (2)
  - 2001, 2002
- Antrim Junior Football Championship (2)
  - 1953, 1991
- Antrim Under-21 Football Championship (3)
  - 2006, 2008, 2010
- Antrim U-19 Football Championship (1)
  - 2023
- Antrim Minor Football Championship (6)
  - 1944, 1975, 1991, 2000, 2019, 2020
- Antrim Division 1 Senior Football League Champions (24)
  - 1987, 1989, 1990, 1992, 1994, 1995, 1997, 1998, 1999, 2000, 2001, 2002, 2003, 2004, 2006, 2007,

2008, 2009, 2010, 2013, 2016, 2017, 2019, 2021

- O’Cahan Cup Winners (26)
  - 1984, 1985, 1986, 1987, 1989, 1990, 1993, 1994, 1995, 1996, 1997, 1999, 2002, 2003, 2004, 2005,

2006, 2007, 2008, 2009, 2010, 2012, 2013, 2014, 2017, 2025

- Antrim Reserve Football Championship (10)
  - 1998, 2005, 2007, 2008, 2009, 2010, 2011, 2016, 2017, 2023
- Antrim Senior Hurling Championship (1)
  - 1939 (Amalgamation with Tír na nÓg Randalstown & Kickhams Creggan)
- Antrim Junior Hurling Championship (1)
  - 1938 (Amalgamation with Tír na nÓg Randalstown & Kickhams Creggan)
- South West Antrim U-14 League (1)
  - 1999, 2002, 2019
- South West Antrim U-16 League (3)
  - 1993, 2002, 2016
- South West Antrim U-16 Shield (2)
  - 2004, 2005
- All Ireland Senior Mens Rounders (4)
  - 1977, 1987, 1988, 1989
- All Ireland Senior Ladies Rounders (8)
  - 1970, 1971, 1972, 1976, 1977, 1978, 1979, 1989
- South West Antrim U-14 Feile (2)
  - 2018, 2019
- Ulster Camogie Junior Championship (1)
  - 2015
- Antrim Camogie Junior Championship (1)
  - 2015
- Antrim Minor B Camogie Championship (1)
  - 2023
- Antrim Senior Ladies Football Junior B Championship (1)
  - 2024
- Antrim U18a Ladies Football Championship (1)
  - 2026
- Antrim U16a Ladies Football Championship (2)
  - 2025, 2026
- Antrim U14a Ladies Football Championship (2)
  - 2024, 2025
- Antrim U15a Ladies Football Feile (1)
  - 2025
- Antrim Senior Ladies Football Division 3 (1)
  - 2024
