= Antrim Senior Football Championship =

Annual Gaelic football competition

- Irish: Craobh Peile Sinsear Aontroma
- Title holders: St Brigid's (1st title)
- Most titles: St John's (24 titles)
- Sponsors: Northern Switchgear

The Antrim Senior Football Championship is an annual Gaelic Athletic Association competition between the top Gaelic football clubs in Antrim GAA. The winners of the championship represent Antrim in the Ulster Senior Club Football Championship.

The current champions are St Brigid's GAC, having defeated O'Donovan Rossa in the 2026 final.

== Wins listed by club ==
| # | Club | Wins | Years won |
|---|---|---|---|
| 1 | St John's | 24 | 1945, 1949, 1951, 1957, 1959, 1960, 1961, 1962, 1963, 1964, 1965, 1969, 1970, 1972, 1975, 1976, 1977, 1978, 1980, 1981, 1984, 1986, 1988, 1998 |
| 2 | St Gall's | 19 | 1933, 1982, 1983, 1987, 1990, 1993, 2001, 2002, 2003, 2004, 2005, 2007, 2008, 2009, 2010, 2011, 2012, 2013, 2014 |
| 3 | O'Donovan Rossa | 16 | 1920, 1921, 1927, 1930,1944, 1946, 1947, 1950, 1952, 1953, 1955, 1956, 1958, 1973, 1989, 1991 |
| 4 | Erin's Own, Cargin | 13 | 1974, 1995, 1999, 2000, 2006, 2015, 2016, 2018, 2019, 2020, 2022, 2023, 2024 |
| 5 | James Stephens | 7 | 1914, 1915, 1916, 1917, 1918, 1919, 1922 |
| 5 | Cuchullians, Dunloy | 7 | 1924, 1925, 1926, 1931, 1935, 1936, 2025 |
| 7 | Seagan An Diomáis | 5 | 1903, 1906, 1908, 1909, 1910 |
| 8 | Patrick Sarsfields | 4 | 1913, 1941, 1967, 1985 |
| 9 | St Paul's | 3 | 1994, 1996, 1997 |
| 9 | Lámh Dhearg | 3 | 1971, 1992, 2017 |
| 9 | Creggan Kickhams | 3 | 1943, 1954, 2021 |
| 9 | Gaelhil Uladh | 3 | 1938, 1939, 1942 |
| 13 | Otlamh Fodhla | 2 | 1904, 1907 |
| 13 | O'Connells | 2 | 1928, 1934 |
| 13 | Mitchels | 2 | 1911, 1912 |
| 13 | Ardoyne | 2 | 1932, 1937 |
| 18 | Tír na nÓg Belfast | 1 | 1902 |
| 18 | O’Neill Crowleys | 1 | 1905 |
| 18 | Davitts | 1 | 1923 |
| 18 | St Teresa's | 1 | 1979 |
| 18 | Pearses | 1 | 1968 |
| 18 | Con Magee's Glenravel | 1 | 1966 |
| 18 | Éire Óg | 1 | 1948 |
| 18 | Lamh Dhearg Toome | 1 | 1929 |
| 18 | O'Donnells | 1 | 1940 |
| 18 | St Brigid's | 1 | 2026 |

== Finals listed by year ==
| Year | Winner | Score | Opponent | Score |
|---|---|---|---|---|
| 2026 | St Brigid's GAC | 0-21 | O'Donovan Rossa | 1-16 |
| 2025 | Dunloy | 3-12 | Erin's Own, Cargin | 2-06 |
| 2024 (A.E.T) | Erin's Own, Cargin | 0-10 | Portglenone | 0-08 |
| 2023 | Erin's Own, Cargin | 2-10 | Cuchullians, Dunloy | 0-11 |
| 2022 | Erin's Own, Cargin | 1-18 | St Mary's, Aghagallon | 3-09 |
| 2021 | Creggan Kickhams | 1-12 | St Mary's, Aghagallon | 0-07 |
| 2020 | Erin's Own, Cargin | 1-22 | Creggan Kickhams | 1-19 |
| 2019 | Erin's Own, Cargin | 1-10, 3-16 (R) | Lámh Dhearg | 0-13, 0-23 (R) |
| 2018 | Erin's Own, Cargin | 0-05 | Creggan Kickhams | 0-04 |
| 2017 | Lámh Dhearg | 0-15 | St John's | 0-13 |
| 2016 | Erin's Own, Cargin | 1-11 | St Gall's | 0-06 |
| 2015 | Erin's Own, Cargin | 2-11 | Lámh Dhearg | 1-05 |
| 2014 | St. Gall's | 1-11 | Erin's Own, Cargin | 0-10 |
| 2013 | St Gall's | 0-12 | Erin's Own, Cargin | 0-11 |
| 2012 | St Gall's | 1-11 | St John's | 1-05 |
| 2011 | St Gall's | 0-14 | Lámh Dhearg | 0-11 |
| 2010 | St Gall's | 3-13 | Erin's Own, Cargin | 0-10 |
| 2009 | St Gall's | 2-20 | Portglenone | 0-06 |
| 2008 | St Gall's | 0-11 | Lámh Dhearg | 0-08 |
| 2007 | St Gall's | 0-10 | Portglenone | 0-04 |
| 2006 | Erin's Own, Cargin | 1-14 | Lámh Dhearg | 2-10 |
| 2005 | St Gall's | 0-11 | Portglenone | 0-08 |
| 2004 | St Gall's | 0-15 | Erin's Own, Cargin | 0-10 |
| 2003 | St Gall's | 0-11, 2-06 (R) | Lámh Dhearg | 1-08, 0-09 (R) |
| 2002 | St Gall's | 1-12 | St Paul's | 1-06 |
| 2001 | St Gall's | 0-09 | St John's | 0-08 |
| 2000 | Erin's Own, Cargin | 0-09 | St Paul's | 0-05 |
| 1999 | Erin's Own, Cargin | 1-14 | St Paul's | 2-08 |
| 1998 | St John's | | Erin's Own, Cargin | |
| 1997 | St Paul's | | St Gall's | |
| 1996 | St Paul's | 0-14 | Erin's Own, Cargin | 1-10 |
| 1995 | Erin's Own, Cargin | 0-08 | St John's | 0-06 |
| 1994 | St Paul's | 1-11 | Erin's Own, Cargin | 0-13 |
| 1993 | St Gall's | 0-13 | Erin's Own, Cargin | 0-02 |
| 1992 | Lámh Dhearg | | | |
| 1991 | O'Donovan Rossa | | St Paul's | |
| 1990 | St Gall's | 0-05 | Erin's Own, Cargin | 0-04 |
| 1989 | O'Donovan Rossa | | Erin's Own, Cargin | |
| 1988 | St John's | | St Gall's | |
| 1987 | St Gall's | | Erin's Own, Cargin | |
| 1986 | St John's | | St Paul's | |
| 1985 | Patrick Sarsfields | | St Paul's | |
| 1984 | St John's | | St Gall's | |
| 1983 | St Gall's | | Lámh Dhearg | |
| 1982 | St Gall's | | St Teresa's | |
| 1981 | St John's | | St Teresa's | |
| 1980 | St John's | | St Teresa's | |
| 1979 | St Teresa's | | St John's | |
| 1978 | St John's | | St Gall's | |
| 1977 | St John's | | Creggan Kickhams | |
| 1976 | St John's | | St Teresa's | |
| 1975 | St John's | | O'Donovan Rossa | |
| 1974 | Erin's Own, Cargin | | Patrick Sarsfields | |
| 1973 | O'Donovan Rossa | | St John's | |
| 1972 | St John's | | Lámh Dhearg | |
| 1971 | Lámh Dhearg | | St John's | |
| 1970 | St John's | | Patrick Sarsfields | |
| 1969 | St John's | | Pearses | |
| 1968 | Pearses | 1-06 | St John's | 0-04 |
| 1967 | Patrick Sarsfields | | Pearses | |
| 1966 | Con Magees, Glenravel | | Patrick Sarsfields | |
| 1965 | St John's | | Patrick Sarsfields | |
| 1964 | St John's | | Pearses | |
| 1963 | St John's | | Rasharkin | |
| 1962 | St John's | | Pearses | |
| 1961 | St John's | | Rasharkin | |
| 1960 | St John's | | Rasharkin | |
| 1959 | St John's | | Rasharkin | |
| 1958 | O'Donovan Rossa | | | |
| 1957 | St John's | | | |
| 1956 | O'Donovan Rossa | | | |
| 1955 | O'Donovan Rossa | | | |
| 1954 | Creggan Kickhams | | | |
| 1953 | O'Donovan Rossa | | | |
| 1952 | O'Donovan Rossa | | | |
| 1951 | St John's | | | |
| 1950 | O'Donovan Rossa | | Éire Óg | |
| 1949 | St John's | | | |
| 1948 | Éire Óg | | St John's | |
| 1947 | O'Connell's | | | |
| 1946 | O'Donovan Rossa | | | |
| 1945 | St John's | | | |
| 1944 | O'Donovan Rossa | | | |
| 1943 | Creggan Kickhams | | | |
| 1942 | Gaedhil Uladh | | Patrick Sarsfields | |
| 1941 | Patrick Sarsfields | | Cuchullains, Dunloy | |
| 1940 | O'Donnell's | | Cuchullains, Dunloy | |
| 1939 | Gaedhil Uladh | | | |
| 1938 | Gaedhil Uladh | | Cuchullains, Dunloy | |
| 1937 | Ardoyne | | Cuchullains, Dunloy | |
| 1936 | Cuchullains, Dunloy | | | |
| 1935 | Cuchullains, Dunloy | | | |
| 1934 | O'Connell's | | Cuchullains, Dunloy | |
| 1933 | St Gall's | | Cuchullains, Dunloy | |
| 1932 | Ardoyne | | Cuchullains, Dunloy | |
| 1931 | Cuchullains, Dunloy | | Joe McKelvey's GAC, Belfast | |
| 1930 | O'Donovan Rossa | | Cuchullains, Dunloy | |
| 1929 | Lámh Dhearg, Toome | | O'Connell's | |
| 1928 | O'Connell's | | | |
| 1927 | O'Donovan Rossa | | Cuchullains, Dunloy | |
| 1926 | Cuchullains, Dunloy | | | |
| 1925 | Cuchullains, Dunloy | | | |
| 1924 | Cuchullains, Dunloy | | | |
| 1923 | Michael Davitt's | | James Stephens | |
| 1922 | James Stephens | | | |
| 1921 | O'Donovan Rossa | | | |
| 1920 | O'Donovan Rossa | | | |
| 1919 | James Stephens | | | |
| 1918 | James Stephens | | | |
| 1917 | James Stephens | | | |
| 1916 | James Stephens | | | |
| 1915 | James Stephens | | | |
| 1914 | James Stephens | | | |
| 1913 | Patrick Sarsfields | | | |
| 1912 | Sean Mitchels | | | |
| 1911 | Sean Mitchels | | | |
| 1910 | Seagan an Doimis | | | |
| 1909 | Seagan an Doimis | | | |
| 1908 | Seagan an Doimis | | | |
| 1907 | Ollamh an Doimis | | | |
| 1906 | Seagan an Doimis | | | |
| 1905 | O'Neill Crowleys | | | |
| 1904 | Ollamh Fodhla | | | |
| 1903 | Seagan an Doimis | | | |
| 1902 | Tir na nÓg | | | |
