= 2011 National Hurling League =

80th season of the National Hurling League

National Hurling League 2011
League details
- Dates: 12 February 2011 – 1 May 2011
- Teams: 35

League champions
- Winners: Dublin (3rd win)
- Captain: John McCaffrey
- Manager: Anthony Daly

League runners-up
- Runners-up: Kilkenny
- Manager: Brian Cody

Other division winners
- Division 2: Limerick
- Division 3A: Wicklow
- Division 3B: Roscommon
- Division 4: Tyrone

The 2011 National Hurling League (known as the Allianz Hurling League for sponsorship reasons) was the 80th season of the National Hurling League.

== Ticket prices ==
In January 2011, the GAA announced a reduction in ticket prices for the 2011 National Hurling League. The decision to cut prices was announced at a Central Council meeting and will see the cost of admission to a league game in the first division of the NHL dropping from €15 to €13, with a €5 admission to lower-level hurling games.

== Division 1 ==
National Hurling League Division 1
- Season: 2011
- Champions: Dublin (3rd title)
- Relegated: Offaly
- Matches: 22
- Top goalscorer: Richie Foley (2-48)
- Biggest home win: Galway 1–24 – 0–06 Wexford (13 February 2011)
- Biggest away win: Tipperary 4-23 - 1-14 Galway (3 April 2011)
- Highest scoring: Tipperary 4-23 - 1-14 Galway (3 April 2011)
- All statistics correct as of 27 April 2017.

Galway came into the season as defending champions of the 2010 season. Wexford entered Division 1 as the promoted team.

On 1 May 2011, Dublin won the title following a 0–22 to 1–7 win over Kilkenny in the final. It was their first league title since 1938–39 and their 3rd National League title overall.

Offaly were relegated from Division 1. Limerick won Division 2 and secured promotion to the top tier.

Waterford's Richie Foley was the Division 1 top scorer with 2-48.

=== Table ===
Team	Pld	W	D	L	Pts	Qualification or Relegation
Kilkenny	7	5	1	1	11	National Hurling League Final
Dublin	7	4	2	1	10	National Hurling League Final
Waterford	7	4	1	2	9	
Tipperary	7	3	2	2	8	
Galway	7	4	0	3	8	
Cork	7	2	1	4	5	
Wexford	7	1	1	5	3	Regraded to 2012 NHL Division 1B
Offaly	7	1	0	6	2	Regraded to 2012 NHL Division 1B

- Tipperary were placed ahead of Galway as they won the head–to–head match between the teams.

=== Group stage ===
12 February 2011 Round 1	Tipperary	1–10 – 1–17	Kilkenny	Semple Stadium, Thurles
7:30 p.m.	P Bourke 0–4 (4f), G Ryan 1–0, N McGrath 0–2 (1s–l), S McGrath, J O'Neill, Patrick Maher, T Hammersley 0–1 each.	Report	R Hogan 0–10 (8f), C Fennelly 1–0, A Fogarty, J Mulhall 0–2 each, M Fennelly, E Brennan, T Walsh 0–1 each.	Attendance: 9,495; Referee: B Gavin (Offaly)

13 February 2011 Round 1	Galway	1–24 – 0–06	Wexford	Pearse Stadium, Galway
2:30 p.m.	G Farragher 0–11 (7f, 3 '65s'), A Callanan 1–2, N Healy (2f), D Barry 0–3 each, E Ryan 0–2, A Cullinane, J Coen, A Smith 0–1 each.	Report	J Berry 0–3 (2f, 1 sideline), S Banville, P J Nolan, N Breen (pen) 0–1 each.	Referee: J McGrath (Westmeath)

13 February 2011 Round 1	Cork	1–20 – 1–15	Offaly	Páirc Uí Chaoimh, Cork
2:30 p.m.	B O'Connor (2f, 1 s–l), P O'Sullivan, P Horgan (2f) 0–4 each, P Cronin 0–3, T Kenny 1–0, C Naughton 0–2, J O'Connor, B Murphy, N McCarthy 0–1 each.	Report	S Dooley 0–6 (5f), B Carroll 0–4, C Egan 1–0, J Bergin 0–2, S Kelly, S Wynne, C Parlon 0–1 each.	Referee: M Wadding (Waterford)

13 February 2011 Round 1	Waterford	3–16 – 2–19	Dublin	Walsh Park, Waterford
2:30 p.m.	R Foley 2–10 (1–7f), S Prendergast 1–1, Padraig Mahony 0–2, J Nagle, S Molumphy, S Casey 0–1 each.	Report	C Keaney 0–10 (8f), D O'Callaghan 1–3, D O'Dwyer 1–1, L Rush 0–2, P Kelly, C McCormack, P Carton 0–1 each.	Referee: D Kirwan (Cork)

19 February 2011 Round 2	Dublin	1–16 – 1–15	Tipperary	Parnell Park, Donnycarney
5:45 p.m.	C Keaney 0–14 (10f), D O'Dwyer 1–0, L Rushe, J Boland 0–1 each.	Report	P Bourke 0–6 (2f), J O'Neill 1–2, S McGrath 0–3(1f), D Young (s–l), M Gleeson, B O'Meara, E Kelly 0–1 each.	Referee: J Sexton (Cork)

20 February 2011 Round 2	Offaly	1–10 – 1–24	Galway	O'Connor Park, Tullamore
1:00 p.m.	J Bergin 1–4 (1–2f), S Dooley 0–3 (1 '65', 1f), B Carroll, C Parlon and M Cordial 0–1 each.	Report	G Farragher 0–8 (6f, 1 s–l), I Tannian 0–6, E Ryan 0–4, A Callanan 1–0, D Burke 0–3, A Cullinane 0–2, J Coen 0–1	Referee: B Kelly (Westmeath)

20 February 2011 Round 2	Kilkenny	0–14 – 1–10	Cork	Nowlan Park, Kilkenny
2:30 p.m.	R Hogan 0–10 (5f, 1 '65), M Fennelly, J Mulhall, M Rice and E Brennan 0–1 each.	Report	P Horgan 1–6 (6f, 1–0 penalty), N McCarthy 0–2, B O'Connor and C McCarthy 0–1 each.	Referee: J Owens (Wexford)

20 February 2011 Round 2	Wexford	0–12 – 1–11	Waterford	Wexford Park, Wexford
2:30 p.m.	J Berry (2f), R Jacob 0–3 each, S Banville, G Sinnott, H Kehoe, D Redmond, C Farrell (65), PJ Nolan 0–1 each	Report	R Foley 0–5 (4f), S Casey 1–0, M Shanahan 0–3 (f, 65), T Ryan 0–2, P Mahony 0–1.	Referee: J Ryan (Tipperary)

5 March 2011 Round 3	Tipperary	1–20 – 0–18	Waterford	Semple Stadium, Thurles
7:30 p.m.	P Bourke 0–8 (4f), N McGrath 0–7, P Kelly 1–0, E Kelly 0–2, D Young, Padraic Maher & B Maher 0–1 each.	Report	R Foley 0–12 (9f), S Prendergast 0–2, S Molumphy, M Shanahan, S Walsh & T Ryan 0–1 each.	Referee: J Owens (Westmeath)

6 March 2011 Round 3	Offaly	1–13 – 2–23	Dublin	O'Connor Park, Tullamore
2:30 p.m.	S Dooley 1–3 (2fs), B Carroll 0–5 (3fs), C Mahon, D Hayden, J Bergin, J Mulrooney, O Kealey 0–1 each.	Report	R O'Dwyer 2–2, C Keaney 0–9 (7fs), D Plunkett 0–3, J McCaffrey, C Clinton 0–2 each, P Schutte, C McCormack, P Carton, P Ryan and S Ryan 0–1 each.	Referee: A Kelly (Galway)

6 March 2011 Round 3	Kilkenny	2–16 – 0–17	Wexford	Nowlan Park, Kilkenny
2:30 p.m.	C Fennelly, TJ Reid (2f) 1–3 each, R Hogan 0–6 (5f), E Brennan, J Fitzpatrick 0–2 each.	Report	J Berry 0–9 (7f), S Banville 0–3, PJ Nolan 0–2, M Jacob, E Quigley, D Redmond 0–1 each.	Referee: T Carroll (Offaly)

6 March 2011 Round 3	Cork	1–20 – 1–17	Galway	Páirc Uí Chaoimh, Cork
2:30 p.m.	P Horgan 1–4 (1–0 pen, 0–4f), C McCarthy, P O'Sullivan 0–3 each, J Gardiner (2f), N McCarthy, J O'Connor, C Naughton 0–2 each, L Farrell, P Cronin 0–1 each.	Report	G Farragher 0–7 (6f), A Callanan 1–2, D Burke 0–4 (2f), J Gantley 0–2, E Ryan, A Smith 0–1 each.	Referee: B Gavin (Offaly)

13 March 2011 Round 4	Waterford	0–18 – 0–17	Cork	Walsh Park, Waterford
2:30 p.m.	S Walsh, R Foley (5f) 0–5 each, J Mullane 0–3, K Moran 0–2, P O'Mahony, S Prendergast and M Shanahan 0–1 each.	Report	P Horgan 0–6 (4f), L O'Farrell 0–3, W Egan, B Murphy, L McLoughlin, P Cronin, C McCarthy, N McCarthy, J O'Connor, J Gardiner ('65') 0–1 each.	Referee: B Kelly (Westmeath)

13 March 2011 Round 4	Galway	4–14 – 3–13	Kilkenny	Pearse Stadium, Galway
2:30 p.m.	I Tannian 2–2, G Farragher 0–8 (5f, 1 '65'), J Gantley, C Donnellan 1–0 each, A Callanan 0–2, A Cullinane, A Smith 0–1 each	Report	R Hogan 0–6 (3f, 1'65'), M Fennelly 1–2, C Fennelly, E Brennan 1–0 each, TJ Reid, E Larkin 0–2 each, J 'Cha' Fitzpatrick 0–1.	Referee: C McAllister (Cork)

13 March 2011 Round 4	Wexford	2–15 – 3–21	Dublin	Wexford Park, Wexford
2:30 p.m.	D O'Callaghan 3–1, J McCaffrey 0–5 (4f), R Dwyer 0–6 (4f), P Carton 0–2, S Lambert, J Boland, D Plunkett, C McCormack, P Schutte, P Ryan, S Ryan 0–1 each.	Report	J Berry 1–7 (7f), G Sinnott 1–1, P J Nolan, R Jacob 0–2 each; H Kehoe, S Banville, D Redmond 0–1 each.	Referee: M Wadding (Waterford)

13 March 2011 Round 4	Tipperary	1–20 – 0–10	Offaly	Nenagh
2:30 p.m.	P Bourke 0–7 (0–3f), B Dunne, B Maher 0–4 each, G Ryan 1–1, S Bourke 0–3, J O'Keeffe 0–1.	Report	B Carroll 0–4f, M Cordial, J Bergin 0–2 each, D Currams, C Egan 0–1 each.	Referee: J McGrath (Westmeath)

27 March 2011 Round 5	Kilkenny	2–16 – 1–13	Waterford	Nowlan Park, Kilkenny
2:30 p.m.	R Hogan 0–7 (5f, 1 '65'), TJ Reid, C Fennelly 1–2 each, A Fogarty 0–3, E Larkin, E Brennan 0–1 each	Report	R Foley 0–7 (5f, 2 '65's), S Walsh 1–0, D O'Sullivan, K Moran, J Mullane, S Molumphy, T Ryan, E McGrath 0–1 each	Referee: J Sexton (Cork)

27 March 2011 Round 5	Dublin	0–14 – 2–11	Galway	Parnell Park, Donnycarney
2:30 p.m.	C McCormack, C Keaney (3f), D Plunkett, P Ryan (1f) 0–3 each, L Rushe, R O'Dwyer 0–1 each	Report	G Farragher 0–5 (4f, 1 s–l), E Ryan, C Donnellan 1–1 each, A Callanan 0–2, J Cooney, D Burke 0–1 each	Referee: D Kirwan (Cork)

27 March 2011 Round 5	Cork	1–14 – 1–14	Tipperary	Páirc Uí Chaoimh, Cork
2:30 p.m.	L O'Farrell 1–1, B O'Connor 0–4f, C McCarthy 0–3 (1 s–l), J Gardiner 0–2f, R Curran, C Naughton, J O'Connor P Cronin 0–1 each	Report	P Bourke 0–6 (3f, 2 '65's), B Dunne 1–2, N McGrath 0–3, J O'Brien, B O'Meara, G Ryan 0–1 each	Referee: M Wadding (Waterford)

27 March 2011 Round 5	Offaly	2–15 – 1–16	Wexford	O'Connor Park, Tullamore
2:30 p.m.	S Dooley 1–10 (8f, 1'65'), D Molloy 1–1, J Bergin 0–2, C Egan, G Healion 0–1 each	Report	J Berry 1–4 (4f), D Redmond, PJ Nolan, R Jacob 0–3 each, S Banville, H Kehoe, P Roche (f) 0–1 each	Referee: A Stapleton (Laois)

2 April 2011 Round 6	Dublin	1–17 – 3–11	Kilkenny	Croke Park, Dublin
5:15 p.m.	P Ryan 1–5 (0–1f, 0–1 '65'), C Keaney 0–5 (3f, 1 '65'), L Rushe, R Dwyer 0–2 each, S Durkin, J McCaffrey, D Plunkett all 0–1 each	Report	M Ruth 2–1, R Hogan 0–5 (2f), E Brennan 1–2, M Fennelly 0–2, A Fogarty 0–1	Referee: B Kelly (Westmeath)

3 April 2011 Round 6	Offaly	1–19 – 2–19	Waterford	O'Connor Park, Tullamore
2:30 p.m.	S Dooley 0–12 (10f, 1 '65'), J Bergin 1–2, B Carroll 0–3, C Egan, C Parlon 0–1 each	Report	R Foley 0–9 (8f, 1 '65'), S Walsh 1–4, B O'Sullivan 1–2, S Prendergast, G Crotty, S O'Sullivan, K Moran 0–1 each	Referee: J Ryan (Tipperary)

3 April 2011 Round 6	Galway	1–14 – 4–23	Tipperary	Pearse Stadium, Galway
2:30 p.m.	G Farragher 0–5 (4f), E Forde 1–2, A Smith 0–2, A Cullinan, J Coen, A Harte, D Burke, I Tannian 0–1 each	Report	S Bourke 3–4, J O’Brien 1–1, P Bourke, (1f 1 '65'), L Corbett, P Maher 0–4, each, S Carey (1f) 0–2, B Dunne, B O’Meara, G Ryan, S McGrath 0–1 each	Referee: J Owens (Wexford)

3 April 2011 Round 6	Wexford	1–16 – 1–15	Cork	Wexford Park, Wexford
2:30 p.m.	P Roche 0–4 (3f, 1 '65'), J Berry 0–4f, PJ Nolan 0–3, S Banville 1–0, D Redmond 0–2, N Kirwan 0–2 (1f), R Jacob 0–1	Report	B O’Connor 0–9 (8f), C Naughton 1–0, B Murphy, T Kenny, B Cooper, P O’Sullivan, M Cussen, P Horgan 0–1 each	Referee: A Kelly (Galway)

17 April 2011 Round 7	Tipperary	0–17 – 1–14	Wexford	Semple Stadium, Thurles
2:30 p.m.	P Bourke 0–6 (3f, 1 '65'), J O'Brien 0–4, J Woodlock 0–3, N McGrath 0–2, S Carey and M Heffernan 0–1 each	Report	J Berry 0–5 (3f), R Jacob 0–4, W Doran 1–0.	Referee: D Kirwan (Cork)

17 April 2011 Round 7	Waterford	1–17 – 1–16	Galway	Walsh Park, Waterford
2:30 p.m.	P Mahony 0–9 (8f), S Walsh 1–4, B O'Sullivan, S O'Sullivan, S Casey, K Moran 0–1 each	Report	J Canning 1–6 (4f), D Hayes 0–3, I Tannian, B Daly 0–2 each, J Coen, N Healy, T Og Regan (f) 0–1 each	Referee: C McAllister (Cork)

17 April 2011 Round 7	Cork	1–14 – 1–15	Dublin	Páirc Uí Chaoimh, Cork
2:30 p.m.	L O'Farrell 1–1, B O'Connor 0–4f, J Gardiner (1f, 1 '65), N McCarthy 0–3 each, K Murphy, P Horgan, C McCarthy 0–1 each.	Report	P Ryan 1–7 (6f), D O'Callaghan 0–7, C Keaney 0–1	Referee: B Gavin (Offaly)

17 April 2011 Round 7	Kilkenny	1–27 – 1–19	Offaly	Nowlan Park, Kilkenny
2:30 p.m.	TJ Reid 0–9 (5f, 1 '65), E Brennan 1–3, R Hogan, J 'Cha' Fitzpatrick, M Rice 0–3 each, P Hogan, M Ruth 0–2 each, M Fennelly, E Larkin 0–1 each	Report	S Dooley 1–8 (6f), B Carroll, C Parlon 0–3 each, C Mahon 0–2, D Molloy, J Bergin, G Healion 0–1 each	Referee: A Stapleton (Laois)

=== Knock-out stage ===
Final

1 May 2011 Final	Kilkenny	1–07 – 0–22	Dublin	Croke Park, Dublin
4:00 p.m.	TJ Reid 0-5 (5f), E Brennan 1-0, P Hogan (1f) M Rice 0-1 each.	Report	P Ryan 0-9 (5f), C Keaney 0-3, R O'Dwyer, M O'Brien 0-2 each, D O'Callaghan, D Plunkett, C McCormack, J McCaffrey, D Treacy, S Lambert 0-1 each	Attendance: 42,030; Referee: M Wadding (Waterford)

=== Scoring statistics ===
Top scorers overall

Rank	Player	County	Tally	Total	Matches	Average
1	Richie Foley	Waterford	2–48	54	6	9.00
2	Richie Hogan	Kilkenny	0–44	44	6	7.33
2	Ger Farragher	Galway	0–44	44	6	7.33
4	Conal Keaney	Dublin	0–42	42	6	7.00
5	Jim Berry	Wexford	2-35	41	7	5.85
5	Pa Bourke	Tipperary	0–41	41	7	5.85
7	Shane Dooley	Offaly	2–34	40	6	6.67
8	Paul Ryan	Dublin	2-26	32	8	4.00
9	Patrick Horgan	Cork	2-22	28	7	4.00
10	T. J. Reid	Kilkenny	2-21	27	8	3.37

Top scorers in a single game

Rank	Player	County	Tally	Total	Opposition
1	Richie Foley	Waterford	2–10	16	Dublin
2	Conal Keaney	Dublin	0–14	14	Tipperary
3	Shane Bourke	Tipperary	3–4	13	Galway
3	Shane Dooley	Offaly	1–10	13	Wexford
5	Richie Foley	Waterford	0–12	12	Tipperary
5	Shane Dooley	Offaly	0–12	12	Waterford
7	Shane Dooley	Offaly	1–8	11	Kilkenny
7	Ger Farragher	Galway	0–11	11	Wexford
9	David O'Callaghan	Dublin	3–1	10	Wexford
9	Paul Ryan	Dublin	1–7	10	Cork
9	Jim Berry	Wexford	1–7	10	Dublin
9	Richie Hogan	Kilkenny	0–10	10	Tipperary
9	Conal Keaney	Dublin	0–10	10	Waterford
9	Richie Hogan	Kilkenny	0–10	10	Cork

== Division 2 ==
National Hurling League Division 2
- Season: 2011
- Champions: Limerick; Captain: Gavin O'Mahony; Manager: Dónal O'Grady
- Relegated: Westmeath
- Matches: 22
- Top goalscorer: Neil McManus (4-46)
- Biggest home win: Clare 4–28 – 0–8 Carlow (17 April 2011)
- Biggest away win: Laois 1-19 - 0-9 Westmeath (13 February 2011)
- Highest scoring: Clare 6–23 – 1–18 Kerry (26 March 2011)
- All statistics correct as of 12 April 2017.

Limerick and Kerry entered Division 2 as the respective relegated and promoted teams from the 2010 season.

On 30 April 2011, Limerick won the title following a 4–12 to 2–13 win over Clare in the final.

Westmeath were relegated from Division 2 after losing all of their group stage matches.

Antrim's Neil McManus was the Division 2 top scorer with 4-46.

=== Table ===
Team	Pld	W	D	L	Pts	Qualification or Relegation
Limerick (C)	7	7	0	0	14	Advance to Division 2 Final and promotion to 2012 Division 1B
Clare	7	5	0	2	10	Advance to Division 2 Final and promotion to 2012 Division 1B
Laois	7	4	0	3	8	Promotion to 2012 Division 1B
Antrim	7	4	0	3	8	Promotion to 2012 Division 1B
Down	7	3	0	4	6	
Carlow	7	3	0	4	6	
Kerry	7	2	0	5	4	
Westmeath	7	0	0	7	0	

- Laois were placed ahead of Antrim as they won the head–to–head match between the teams.
- Down were placed ahead of Carlow as they won the head–to–head match between the teams.

=== Group stage ===
13 February 2011 Round 1	Kerry	1–15 – 0–12	Antrim	Austin Stack Park, Tralee
12:30pm	D O'Connell 0–5 (5f), M Boyle 0–2, A Royle, D Dineen, L Boyle, A Boyle, J Flaherty 0–1 each	Report	PJ O'Connell 1–0, K Stewart, N McManus (3f), S McNaughton 0–3 each, K McKeegan 0–2, S McCrory, D Hamill, C McFall, T McCann 0–1 each	Referee: D O'Driscoll (Limerick)

13 February 2011 Round 1	Down	2–11 – 0–14	Carlow	St. Patrick's Park, Portaferry
1:30 p.m.	E Clarke 1–2 (1–0 sideline, 1f, 1 '65'), G Johnson 0–5 (4f), A O'Prey 1–1, P Keith, C Mageean, J Coyle 0–1 each	Report	D Kavanagh 0–4 (3f, 0–1 '65), E Nolan, P Kehoe (2f), A Gaule 0–3 each, C Doyle 0–1 (1f)	Referee: R Mathews (Antrim)

13 February 2011 Round 1	Westmeath	0–09 – 1–19	Laois	Cusack Park, Mullingar
2:30 p.m.	A Mitchell (3f), B Murtagh (1f) 0–3 each, C Flanagan, B Smyth, A Devine 0–1 each.	Report	J Purcell 1–3, W Hyland 0–5 (3f, 1 '65'), J Brophy, O Holohan 0–3 each, B Dunne 0–2, N Foyle, J Walsh, N Costelloe 0–1 each	Referee: T Carroll (Offaly)

13 February 2011 Round 1	Clare	0–06 – 2–09	Limerick	Cusack Park, Ennis
2:30 p.m.	C McGrath (2f), N O'Connell (1f, 1 '65') 0–2 each, J McInerney (1,f), F Lynch 0–1 each.	Report	R McCarthy 1–5 (1–0 pen, 4f), G Mulcahy 1–1, K Downes, D O'Grady, J Ryan 0–1 each.	Referee: J Ryan (Tipperary)

19 February 2011 Round 2	Limerick	1–20 – 0–15	Westmeath	Gaelic Grounds, Limerick
2:30 p.m.	J Ryan, R McCarthy (4f) 0–5 each, E Ryan 0–4 (3f, 1'65'), P Tobin 1–1, D O'Grady, N Maher 0–2 each, A O'Shaughnessy 0–1	Report	A Mitchell 0–4 (1f, 1'65'), D Carthy 0–3 (2f), E Price, B Smyth, B Murtagh (1f) 0–2 each, N Flanagan, C Curley 0–1 each	Referee: A Stapleton (Laois)

20 February 2011 Round 2	Antrim	2–13 – 2–14	Clare	Casement Park, Belfast
1:30 p.m.	N McManus 1–4 (2f), K Stewart 0–4 (3f), L Kearns 1–0, C Carson 0–2, K McKeegan, C McFall, S McNaughton 0–1 each	Report	N O'Connell 0–7 (6f), C McGrath 1–1, C McInerney 1–0, J Conlon, D Honan 0–2 each, P Vaughan, D McMahon 0–1 each	Referee: E Hassan (Derry)

20 February 2011 Round 2	Kerry	2–23 – 3–17	Down	Fitzgerald Stadium, Killarney
1:30 p.m.	D O'Connell 0–10 (6f), J Egan 1–2, M Boyle 0–4, L Boyle 0–3, A Boyle 1–0, S Nolan 0–2, J Griffin and D Dineen 0–1 each	Report	G Johnson 1–5 (1–0 pen, 1f), J Coyles 0–4 (2f), B Ennis 0–4, C Mageen and S Nicholson 1–0 each, C Woods 0–2 (1f, 1 '65'), A O'Prey 0–2	Referee: M O'Connor (Limerick)

20 February 2011 Round 2	Laois	2–10 – 0–20	Carlow	O'Moore Park, Portlaoise
2:45 p.m.	J Brophy 1–1, W Hyland 0–3 (2f, 1 '65'), N Foyle 1–0, N Costelloe, O Houlihan 0–2, M Whelan (1f), B Dunne 0–1 each	Report	P Kehoe 0–8 (7f, 1 '65'), C Doyle 0–5, A Gaule 0–2, D Shaw, B Doyle, E Nolan, E Byrne, A McDonald 0–1 each.	Referee: A Kelly (Galway)

5 March 2011 Round 3	Laois	0–20 – 0–16	Antrim	O'Moore Park, Portlaoise
2:00 p.m.	W Hyland 0–8 (7f), C Murray 0–4, B Dunne, N Foyle (1f) 0–2 each, M Whelan (1 '65'), J Walsh, S Burke, J Brophy 0–1 each.	Report	N McManus 0–13 (10f, 1 '65'), K Stewart, D Hamill, S McCrory 0–1 each.	Referee: C Lyons (Cork)

6 March 2011 Round 3	Down	2–11 – 1–25	Limerick	Mitchell Park, Ballygalget
1:30 p.m.	J Coyle 0–6, S Nicholson 1–1, A Clarke 1–0, B Ennis 0–2, A Savage, C Woods 0–1 each.	Report	P Tobin 1–3, R McCarthy 0–5, S Tobin 0–4; D O'Grady, J Ryan, B Geary 0–3 each, K Downes, T O'Brien, N Moran, T Condon 0–1 each.	Referee: E Elliott (Antrim)

6 March 2011 Round 3	Carlow	2–17 – 1–12	Kerry	Dr. Cullen Park, Carlow
2:30 p.m.	P Kehoe 0–6 (4f), M Brennan, E Byrne 1–2 each, A Gaule 0–3, D Kavanagh (1f), J Kavanagh, C Doyle, K McCabe 0–1 each.	Report	M Boyle, D O'Connell (3f) 0–3 each, R Kenny 1–0, L Boyle, M Conway (1f, 1 '65') 0–2 each, A Royle, J Egan 0–1 each.	Referee: S Whelan (Wexford)

6 March 2011 Round 3	Westmeath	2–17 – 1–27	Clare	Cusack Park, Mullingar
2:30 p.m.	D McNicholas 1–5 (0–1 sideline), B Murtagh 1–4 (1–3fs), B Smyth 0–2, E Price, A Mitchell ('65'), J Shaw, C Flanagan, C Curley and A Devine 0–1 each	Report	C Ryan 0–9 (4fs), D Honan 1–4, N O'Connell (2fs), J Conlon 0–3 each, J Clancy, C Morey and F Lynch 0–2 each, P O'Connor, C McInerney 0–1 each.	Referee: G Duffy (Antrim)

12 March 2011 Round 4	Kerry	1–15 – 1–13	Westmeath	Austin Stack Park, Tralee
2:30 p.m.	D O'Connell 0–9 (8f, 1 '65), A Boyle 1–0, L Boyle 0–2, M Conway (1f), D Dineen, M Boyle, R Kenny 0–1 each.	Report	D McNicholas 1–1, A Mitchell (1f, 1 '65), D Carthy (3f), B Murtagh 0–3 each, P Gilsenan, N Flanagan, N Dowdall 0–1 each.	Referee: C Lyons (Cork)

13 March 2011 Round 4	Clare	5–22 – 0–06	Down	Cusack Park, Ennis
2:30 p.m.	C Ryan 2–6 (1–0 pen 0–2f), D McMahon 2–0, N O'Connell 0–6 (6f), C Morey 1–1, J Conlon 0–3, F Lynch, C Dillon 0–2 each, J Clancy, S Collins 0–1 each.	Report	E Clarke 0–3 (2f), J Coyle 0–2 (2f), C Mageean 0–1.	Referee: T Ryan (Tipperary)

13 March 2011 Round 4	Antrim	0–10 – 1–06	Carlow	Casement Park, Belfast
2:30 p.m.	N McManus 0–5 (5f), S McCrory 0–2, D Hamill, M Herron, K Stewart 0–1 each.	Report	P Kehoe 1–2 (0–1f), D Kavanagh (1f), E Byrne, J Kavanagh, HP O'Byrne 0–1 each.	Referee: B Gavin (Offaly)

13 March 2011 Round 4	Limerick	1–18 – 0–16	Laois	Gaelic Grounds, Limerick
2:30 p.m.	R McCarthy 0–8 (3f), P Tobin 1–2, S Hickey, P Browne 0–2 each, B Geary (1f), D O'Grady, J Ryan, T O'Brien 0–1 each.	Report	W Hyland 0–6 (4f), O Holohan 0–3, J Walsh, S Burke 0–2 each, B Dunne, C Murray, E Costelloe 0–1 each.	Referee: D Kirwan (Cork)

26 March 2011 Round 5	Clare	6–23 – 1–18	Kerry	Cusack Park, Ennis
2:30 p.m.	J McInerney (0–1), N O'Connell (1–4), S Collins (0–3); J Conlon (2–1), F Lynch (0–1), J Clancy (0–3); C Ryan (0–2), D McMahon (2–2), C McGrath (0–3), D Honan (0–3)	Report	C Harris (0–1), M Conway (0–1), S Nolan (0–3), D O'Connell (0–11, all frees), R Kenny (0–1), J Egan (1–1)	Referee: P Green (Galway)

27 March 2011 Round 5	Down	3–15 – 3–11	Laois	McKenna Park, Ballycran
1:30 p.m.	G Johnson 2–2, P Braniff 1–7(2f), B Ennis, J Coyle 0–2 each, A Savage, E Clarke 0–1 each	Report	W. Hyland 1–5 (4f), N Foyle 2–0, J Brophy 0–3, E Costello 0–2, C Murray 0–1	Referee: E Hasson (Derry)

27 March 2011 Round 5	Westmeath	2–09 – 2–13	Antrim	Cusack Park, Mullingar
2:30 p.m.	D Carty 1–4 (4 f), A Mitchell 0–4 (3 f, 1 '65'), A Devine 1–0, A Price 0–1	Report	N McManus 0–7 (4f), C Carson 2–0, K Stewart 0–3, S McNaughton 0–2, J Black 0–1	Referee: D O'Driscoll (Limerick)

27 March 2011 Round 5	Carlow	1–15 – 3–18	Limerick	Dr. Cullen Park, Carlow
2:30 p.m.	R Dunbar 0–5 (4f), E Nolan 1–1, M Brennan 0–4, E Byrne, D Kavanagh (2f) 0–2 each, J Kavanagh 0–1	Report	S Tobin 2–4 (0–2f), P McNamara 1–2, R McCarthy 0–5 (3f, 1 '65'), B Hourigan, D Ryan 0–2 each, D O'Grady, J Ryan, N Maher 0–1 each	Referee: T Carroll (Offaly)

2 April 2011 Round 6	Carlow	2–15 – 1–14	Westmeath	Dr. Cullen Park, Carlow
2:30 p.m.	R Dunbar 0–6 (6f), E Byrne, E Nolan 1–1 each, J Kavanagh 0–2, C Clancy, J Rogers, M Brennan, P Kehoe, A Gaule 0–1 each	Report	R Whelan 1–2, A Mitchell 0–3 (2f, 1 '65'), D Carty 0–3 (2f), D McNicholas 0–2, J Shaw, E Price, C Curley, B Murtagh (pen) 0–1 each	Referee: J O'Connell (Cork)

2 April 2011 Round 6	Laois	3–16 – 3–13	Clare	O'Moore Park, Portlaoise
5:00 p.m.	W Hyland 1–10 (8f), J Brophy, O Holohan 1–0 each, S Bourke, James Walsh 0–2 each, M Whelan (1f), J Fitzpatrick 0–1 each	Report	N O'Connell 0–7 (4f), C McGrath 1–3 (2f), D Honan, J Clancy 1–0 each, J Conlon, D McMahon, F Lynch 0–1 each	Referee: M O'Connor (Limerick)

3 April 2011 Round 6	Limerick	1–24 – 1–09	Kerry	FitzGerald Park, Kilmallock
1:00 p.m.	K Downes 1–3, R McCarthy 0–5 (3f), P Tobin, N Moran 0–4 each, P Browne 0–3, J Ryan, E Ryan 0–2 each, S Tobin 0–1	Report	D O'Connell 1–6 (3f), S Nolan 0–2, J Egan 0–1 (1f)	Referee: S Whelan (Wexford)

3 April 2011 Round 6	Down	1–14 – 5–08	Antrim	McKenna Park, Ballycran
2:30 p.m.	P Braniff 1–6 (4f), S Johnson, S Clarke, C O'Prey 0–2 each, S Nicholson, J Coyle 0–1 each	Report	N McManus 3–5 (1–0 pen, 4f), K Stewart 2–1, S McCrory 0–2	Referee: J McGrath (Westmeath)

17 April 2011 Round 7	Antrim	0–15 – 4–15	Limerick	Casement Park, Belfast
2:30 p.m.	N McManus 0–9 (9f), B McFall 0–3, S McCrory, C McGuinness, K Stewart 0–1 each.	Report	K Downes 3–0, D Hannon 0–6 (1f), S Tobin 1–1, P Browne (2f), R MacCarthy (1f), J Ryan 0–2 each, E Reale, W McNamara 0–1 each	Referee: E Hasson (Derry)

17 April 2011 Round 7	Kerry	1–15 – 4–15	Laois	Austin Stack Park, Tralee
2:30 p.m.	D O'Connell 0-6 (5f), J Egan 0-4, A Boyle 1-0, S Nolan, J Flaherty 0-2 each, P O'Keeffe 0-1.	Report	W Hyland 0–9 (5f), S Bourke 2–2, G Reddan 1–1, O Holohan 1–0, B Dunne, N Costelloe, J Rowney 0–1 each	Referee: G O'Connell (Cork)

17 April 2011 Round 7	Westmeath	3–15 – 4–14	Down	Cusack Park, Mullingar
2:30 p.m.	B Murtagh 3–9 (2–5f), E Price, C Curley 0–2 each, R Whelan, A Devine 0–1 each.	Report	P Braniff 1–5 (1–0 pen, 5f), G Johnson 2–1 (1f), B Ennis 0–5, D Hughes 1–0, K McGarry, S Clarke and S Nicholson 0–1 each	Referee: D Hughes (Carlow)

17 April 2011 Round 7	Clare	4–28 – 0–08	Carlow	Cusack Park, Ennis
2:30 p.m.	N O'Connell 0–8 (3f, 1 '65), D McMahon 2–4, C Ryan 1–4, J Clancy 1–3, C McGrath 0–4, J Conlon 0–3, S Collins, C Tierney 0–1 each	Report	R Dunbar 0–4 (1f); E Nolan, E Byrne, J Kavanagh, P Kehoe 0–1 each.	Referee: M Haverty (Galway)

=== Knock-out stage ===
Final

30 April 2011 Final	Clare	2-13 - 4-12	Limerick	Cusack Park, Ennis
7:00 p.m.	J Conlon 0-4, D Honan 1-1, C McGrath 1-0, N O'Connell 0-3, (2 '65'), C Ryan (2f), F Lynch 0-2, each, L Markham 0-1.	Report	K Downes 1-2, D Hannon, S Tobin 1-1 each, R McCarthy 0-4 (3f), P Browne 0-2, D O'Grady, N Moran, 0-1 each, (D Tuohy 1-0 og)	Referee: J McGrath (Westmeath)

=== Scoring statistics ===
Top scorers overall

Rank	Player	County	Tally	Total	Matches	Average
1	Neil McManus	Antrim	4-46	58	7	8.28
2	Darragh O'Connell	Kerry	1-50	53	7	7.57
3	Willie Hyland	Laois	2-46	52	7	7.42
4	Nicky O'Connell	Clare	1-40	43	8	5.37
5	Richie McCarthy	Limerick	1-37	42	8	5.25
6	Brendan Murtagh	Westmeath	4-22	34	7	4.85
7	Colin Ryan	Clare	3-23	31	7	4.42
8	Gareth Johnson	Down	5-15	30	5	6.00
9	Paul Braniff	Down	3-18	27	3	9.00
10	Diarmuid McMahon	Clare	6-08	26	7	3.71

Top scorers in a single game

Rank	Player	County	Tally	Total	Opposition
1	Brendan Murtagh	Westmeath	3-09	18	Down
2	Neil McManus	Antrim	3-05	14	Down
3	Willie Hyland	Laois	1-10	13	Clare
4	Colin Ryan	Clare	2-06	12	Down
5	Darragh O'Connell	Kerry	0-11	11	Down
6	Diarmuid McMahon	Clare	2-04	10	Carlow
6	Seán Tobin	Limerick	2-04	10	Carlow
6	Paul Braniff	Down	1-07	10	Laois
6	Darragh O'Connell	Kerry	0-10	10	Down
10	Kevin Downes	Limerick	3-00	9	Antrim
10	Paul Braniff	Down	1-06	9	Antrim
10	Darragh O'Connell	Kerry	1-06	9	Limerick
10	Willie Hyland	Laois	0-09	9	Kerry
10	Neil McManus	Antrim	0-09	9	Limerick
10	Darragh O'Connell	Kerry	0-09	9	Westmeath
10	Colin Ryan	Clare	0-09	9	Westmeath

== Division 3A ==
National Hurling League Division 3A
- Season: 2011
- Champions: Wicklow; Captain: Jonathan O'Neill; Manager: Casey O'Brien
- Relegated: Armagh
- Matches: 16
- Top goalscorer: Jonathan O'Neill (2-52)
- Biggest home win: Derry 3–16 – 0–15 Armagh (13 February 2011)
- Biggest away win: London 3-15 – 2-10 Armagh (20 February 2011)
- Highest scoring: Wicklow 2–20 – 3–14 Derry (17 April 2011)
- All statistics correct as of 12 April 2017.

Kildare and Wicklow entered Division 3A as the respective relegated and promoted teams from the 2010 season.

On 17 April 2011, Wicklow won the title following a 2–20 to 3–14 win over Derry in the final.

Armagh were relegated from Division 3A after losing all but one of their group stage matches.

Wicklow's Jonathan O'Neill was the Division 3A top scorer with 2-52.

=== Table ===
Division 3A Final Automatic Relegation

Team	Pld	W	D	L	Pts	Qualification or relegation
Wicklow	5	4	0	1	8	Advance to Division 3A Final and promotion to 2012 Division 2A
Derry	5	4	0	1	8	Advance to Division 3A Final and promotion to 2012 Division 2A
London	5	2	0	3	4	Regraded to 2012 Division 2B
Kildare	5	2	0	3	4	Regraded to 2012 Division 2B
Meath	5	2	0	3	4	Regraded to 2012 Division 2B
Armagh	5	1	0	4	2	Regraded to 2012 Division 2B

- Wicklow are placed ahead of Derry as they won the head–to–head match between the teams.
- London, Kildare and Meath are ranked by score difference.

=== Group stage ===
13 February 2011 Round 1	London	1–13 – 1–08	Meath	Emerald GAA Grounds, Ruislip
2:30p.m.	M Finn 1–7 (1–0pen, 4f, 2 '65'); R O'Connell, S Ryan 0–2 each; P Sloane, N Healy (f) 0–1 each	Report	N Hacket 0–4 (4f); N Kirby 0–3 (3f); M Cole 1–0; T Durnan 0–1	Referee: P Casey (Waterford)

13 February 2011 Round 1	Wicklow	2–14 – 0–17	Kildare	Pearse Park, Arklow
2:30 p.m.	J O'Neill 1–8 (0–5f), E Flynn 1–0, D Hyland 0–3, Thomas Doyle 0–2, E Kearns, Alan Driver 0–1 each.	Report	C Kenny 0–5, M Moloney, M Fitzgerald (2f) 0–4 each, R Hoban, D Kennedy (2 '65's) 0–2 each, N O Muineachain 0–1.	Referee: S Cleary (Kilkenny)

13 February 2011 Round 1	Derry	3–16 – 0–15	Armagh	Fr. McNally Park, Feeny
2:30 p.m.	P Henry 0–6 (6f), R Convery 1–5 (1–0 pen, 2 '65s', 3f), A Grant 1–1, P McCloskey 1–0, K Hinphey 0–2, O Doherty, P Kelly 0–1 each	Report	D Coulter 0–9 (2 '65s', 6f), C Carville, R Gaffney (1f) 0–2, C Corvan 0–2 each.	Referee: D McGee (Down)

20 February 2011 Round 2	Kildare	0–19 – 1–20	Derry	St. Conleth's Park, Newbridge
12:45 p.m.	M Moloney (2f), D Kennedy (3f, 1 '65, 1 pen) 0–5 each, M Fitzgerald (1f), D Harney(2fs) 0–3 each, L Quinn 0–2, R Hoban 0–1.	Report	P Henry 1–7 (5f), R Convery 0–6(4f), K Hinphey 0–3, A Rafferty, O Doherty, O McCloskey, P McCloskey 0–1 each.	Referee: M Haverty (Galway)

20 February 2011 Round 2	Armagh	2–10 – 3–15	London	Athletic Grounds, Armagh
1:00 p.m.	D Coulter 1–3 (2f, 1 '65'), R Gaffney 0–3, P Breen 1–0, C Carvill, M Maguire, J King, M Moen 0–1 each.	Report	M Finn 1–7 (5f), R O'Connell, S Richardson 1–0, K Walsh, S Ryan 0–2 each, P Sloane, H Vaughan, T Twomey 0–1.	Referee: O Elliot (Antrim)

20 February 2011 Round 2	Meath	0–11 – 1–11	Wicklow	Páirc Tailteann, Navan
1:00 p.m.	S Clynch 0–6 (3f), D Kirby, J Keena 0–2 each, M Cole 0–1.	Report	J O'Neill 0–8 (8f), E Glynn 1–1, D Hyland 0–2.	Referee: T Ryan (Tipperary)

6 March 2011 Round 3	London	1–14 – 1–15	Wicklow	Emerald GAA Grounds, Ruislip
1:00 p.m.	M Finn 1–8 (6f), S Ryan 0–3, N Healy 0–2 (2f), N Forde 0–1.	Report	J O'Neill 0–10 (9f), A O'Brien 1–1, D Hyland 0–2, E Dunne, E Kearns 0–1 each.	Referee: J O'Connell (Cork)

6 March 2011 Round 3	Armagh	0–12 – 1–16	Kildare	Athletic Grounds, Armagh
2:30 p.m.	P Breen 0–6 (6f), R Gaffney 0–2, M Lennon, R McGrattan, J Corvan, C Carvill 0–1 each.	Report	G Sunderland 0–4 (4f), M Fitzgerald 1–1 (1–0f), D Harney, M Maloney 0–3 each, K Walzer, F Monaghan 0–2 each, T Murphy 0–1.	Referee: E Hasson (Derry)

6 March 2011 Round 3	Derry	0–15 – 0–14	Meath	Davitt Park, Swatragh
2:30 p.m.	R Convery 0–6 (2f, '65'), K Hinphey 0–4, P Henry 0–3 (1f), P McCloskey 0–2.	Report	N Horan 0–8 (4f), D Kirby 0–2, J Keena, D Raleigh, S Clynch (1f), P Geoghan 0–1 each.	Referee: E Shaughnessey (Galway)

13 March 2011 Round 4	Meath	1–20 – 1–17	Armagh	Páirc Tailteann, Navan
12:45 p.m.	N Horan 0–8 (6f), D Doran 0–6, P Durnin 1–3, J Keena 0–2, S Clynch 0–1.	Report	D Coulter 0–11 (2 '65', 1f), M Lennon 0–3, C Carvill 1–1, P McCormack 0–2.	Referee: R Mathews (Antrim)

13 March 2011 Round 4	Kildare	2–16 – 1–15	London	St. Conleth's Park, Newbridge
1:00 p.m.	M Fitzgerald 1-7 (4f), K Walzer 1-3(1f), D Harney 0-2, D Kennedy (f), F Ó Muineacháin, L Quinn, C Buggy 0-1 each.	Report	M Finn 0-9 (7f, 1 '65'); S Ryan 1-3; N Forde, H Vaughan, R O'Connell 0-1 each.	Referee: P Murphy (Carlow)

13 March 2011 Round 4	Wicklow	2–15 – 1–17	Derry	Pearse Park, Arklow
2:30 p.m.	J O’Neill 0-10 (7f), A O’Brien 2-3, D Hyland, R Keddy 0-1 each	Report	P Henry 0-6 (2f), P Kelly 1-3, R Convery 0-4, A Grant, P McCloskey, O McCloskey, K Hinphey 0-1 each	Referee: P O'Dwyer (Carlow)

27 March 2011 Round 5	Armagh	5–11 – 2–14	Wicklow	Athletic Grounds, Armagh
2:30 p.m.	D Coulter 2–6 (0–3 '65'), C Corvan 2–2, K McKernan 1–0, J Corvan, J King, P Heaney 0–1 each	Report	J O'Neill 1–8 (0–2f, 0–2 '65'), A O'Brien 1–1, D Hyland 0–2, E Kearns, T Doyle, W O'Gorman 0–1 each	Referee: R Matthews (Antrim)

27 March 2011 Round 5	Kildare	3–13 – 2–19	Meath	St. Conleth's Park, Newbridge
2:30 p.m.	M Fitzgerald 1–5 (0–5f), K Walzer 1–1 (0–1f), T Murphy 1–0, M Moloney, C Kenny 0–2 each, L Quinn, F O'Muineachain, D Harney 0–1 each	Report	N Horan 0–7 (4f, 1'65'), M Cole 1–2, D Doran 1–1, P Durnin 0–3, N Kirby 0–2, S Donoghue, P Geoghegan, P Fagan (1f), J Keena 0–1 each	Referee: E Shaughnessy (Galway)

27 March 2011 Round 5	Derry	1–14 – 1–13	London	Davitt Park, Swatragh
2:30 p.m.	K Hinphey 1–2, O McCloskey 0–5, R Convery 0–3f, P Henry 0–2, P Kelly, P McCloskey 0–1 each	Report	M Finn 1–4 (0–4f), P Sloane 0–4 (2f), N Forde, M Walsh, R O'Connell, J Mulcahy, S Ryan 0–1 each	Referee: G Duffy (Antrim)

=== Knock-out stage ===
Final

17 April 2011 Final	Wicklow	2–20 – 3–14	Derry	Pearse Park, Longford
	A O'Brien 2-2, J O'Neill 0-8 (5f, 1'65'), E Glynn 0-5, W Collins 1-0 og, L Glynn 0-2, G Bermingham, R Keddy 0-1 each.	Report	R Convery 1- 9 (1-8f), O Doherty 1-1, P Henry 0-2, A Grant, C McKeever 0-1 each.	Referee: F Smith (Meath)

=== Scoring statistics ===
Top scorers overall

Rank	Player	County	Tally	Total	Matches	Average
1	Jonathan O'Neill	Wicklow	2–52	58	6	9.66
2	Martin Finn	London	4–35	47	5	9.40
3	Ruairí Convery	Derry	2–33	39	6	6.50
4	Declan Coulter	Armagh	3–29	38	4	9.50
5	Martin Fitzgerald	Kildare	3–20	29	5	5.80
5	Paddy Henry	Derry	1–26	29	6	4.83
7	Andy O'Brien	Wicklow	6–07	25	6	4.16
8	Nicky Horan	Meath	0–23	23	3	7.66

Top scorers in a single game

Rank	Player	County	Tally	Total	Opposition
1	Declan Coulter	Armagh	2–06	12	Wicklow
2	Jonathan O'Neill	Wicklow	1–08	11	Kildare
2	Martin Finn	London	1–08	11	Wicklow
2	Jonathan O'Neill	Wicklow	1–08	11	Armagh
2	Declan Coulter	Armagh	0–11	11	Meath
6	Paddy Henry	Derry	1–07	10	Kildare
6	Martin Finn	London	1–07	10	Meath
6	Martin Fitzgerald	Kildare	1–07	10	London
6	Martin Finn	London	1–07	10	Armagh
6	Jonathan O'Neill	Wicklow	0–10	10	Derry
6	Jonathan O'Neill	Wicklow	0–10	10	London

== Division 3B ==
National Hurling League Division 3B
- Season: 2011
- Champions: Rosocmmon; Captain: Shane Curley; Manager: Séamus Qualter
- Relegated: Monaghan
- Matches: 22
- Top goalscorer: Keith Raymond (2-36)
- Biggest home win: Louth 3–20 – 0–05 Sligo (13 February 2011)
- Biggest away win: Louth 6–12 – 1–8 Donegal (3 April 2011)
- Highest scoring: Roscommon 2–24 – 0–15 Louth (10 April 2011)
- All statistics correct as of 12 April 2017.

Mayo and Monaghan entered Division 3B as the respective relegated and promoted teams from the 2010 season.

On 17 April 2011, Roscommon won the title following a 0–17 to 1–12 win over Mayo in the final.

Monaghan were relegated from Division 3B after losing all but one of their group stage matches.

=== Table ===
Team	Pld	W	D	L	Pts	Qualification or relegation
Mayo	6	4	0	1	10	Advance to Division 3B Final and promotion to 2012 Division 2B
Roscommon	6	4	0	1	10	Advance to Division 3B Final and promotion to 2012 Division 2B
Louth	6	4	0	2	8	Regraded to 2012 Division 3A
Fingal	6	3	0	3	6	Regraded to 2012 Division 3A
Donegal	6	2	0	4	4	Regraded to 2012 Division 3A
Sligo	6	1	0	5	2	Regraded to 2012 Division 3A
Monaghan	6	2	0	4	4	Regraded to 2012 Division 3A

- Sligo were placed ahead of Monaghan as they won the head–to–head match between the teams.
- Mayo were placed ahead of Roscommon as they won the head–to–head match between the teams.

=== Group stage ===
13 February 2011 Round 1	Fingal	4–18 – 0–13	Monaghan	Lawless Memorial Park, Swords
1:00 p.m.	M Ormonde 2–8 (0–7f), A McInerney 0–4, P Daly 1–0, R McGarry 0–2 (1f), C O'Mahoney 1–1, D de Burca, P McAllister, M Cussen 0–1 each.	Report	S Lambe 0–9 (8f), S Roche, R Meegan, M McHugh (1f), G Boyd 0–1 each.	Referee: C Lyons (Cork)

13 February 2011 Round 1	Louth	3–20 – 0–05	Sligo	Dundalk
2:30 p.m.	G Smyth 1–4 (1f), B Corcoran 0–5 (1f), S Callan 1–1 (1–0 sideline), A Callan 1–0, D O'Hanrahan, Diarmuid O'Sullivan 0–2 each, D McArdle, D Murphy ('65), Donagh O'Sullivan, D Dunne, W Morrissey, G Kerrigan 0–1 each.	Report	K Raymond 0–4 (4f), N Cadden 0–1.	Referee: P O'Dwyer (Carlow)

13 February 2011 Round 1	Mayo	0–17 – 1–06	Roscommon	Tooreen
2:30 p.m.	K Higgins 0–10 (10f), E Madigan 0–3, N Murphy 0–2, K Feeney, P Connell 0–1 each.	Report	M Kelly 1–1 (pen), Gary Fallon, Gerry Fallon (2f) 0–2 each.	Referee: J O'Mahoney (Limerick)

20 February 2011 Round 2	Mayo	1–13 – 0–09	Fingal	McHale Park, Castlebar
1:00 p.m.	K Feeney 0–6 (6f), N Murphy 1–1, B Higgins 0–2, S Morley, P Connell, S Hoban, E Madigan 0–1 each.	Report	M Ormonde 0–5 (5f), S Sheridan 0–2, R McGarry, A McInerney 0–1 each.	Referee: C Brown (Galway)

20 February 2011 Round 2	Donegal	2–09 – 1–14	Roscommon	O'Donnell Park, Letterkenny
2:30 p.m.	N Campbell 0–6 (5f), E McDermott, L Henderson 1–1 each, S McVeigh 0–1.	Report	Gary Fallon 0–8 (8f), J Coyne 1–3, Gerry Fallon, P Kelleghan, M Kelly 0–1 each	Referee: E Shaughnessy (Galway)

20 February 2011 Round 2	Louth	3–18 – 1–04	Monaghan	Dundalk
2:30 p.m.	Diarmuid O'Sullivan 2–2, B Corcoran 1–3, G Smyth 0–6 (6f), S Callan 0–3, D Murphy, Donagh O'Sullivan, D Dunne, D O'Hanrahan 0–1 each.	Report	S Lambe 0–4 (0–4f), G Boyd 1–0.	Referee: D McGee (Down)

6 March 2011 Round 3	Monaghan	1–14 – 3–12	Donegal	St. Tiernach's Park, Clones
2:30 p.m.	S Lambe 0–7 (6f), M McHugh 1–0 (1f), R Meegan 0–3, E MacSuibhne 0–2, S Leonard, S Roche 0–1 each.	Report	N Campbell 1–5 (1–0 pen, 3f) C Matthewson 1–2 (1f), E Organ 1–1, P Sheridan, S Boyle, E McDermott, S McVeigh 0–1 each.	Referee: R Matthews (Antrim)

6 March 2011 Round 3	Roscommon	1–19 – 1–10	Sligo	Athleague Sportsfield, Athleague
2:30 p.m.	J Coyne 1–5, Gary Fallon 0–5 (4f), M Kelly 0–4 (3f, 1 '65'), David Loughnane, B Kelly, Gerry Fallon, J Moran, P Kelly 0–1 each.	Report	Declan Loughnane 1–2, K Raymond 0–5 (3f, 1 '65'), C Brennan, N Cadden, L Cadden 0–1 each.	Referee: D O'Driscoll (Limerick)

6 March 2011 Round 3	Fingal	0–14 – 1–14	Louth	Lawless Memorial Park, Swords
2:30 p.m.	JM Sheridan 0–6 (5f), D Byrne 0–3, D Vaughan, A McInerney, D de Burca, C Donegan, P Daly 0–1 each.	Report	G Smyth 0–8 (7f, 1 '65'), Diarmuid O'Sullivan 1–1, D O Hodhrain 0–2, S Callan, D Dunne, B Corcoran 0–1 each

13 March 2011 Round 4	Louth	2–14 – 3–12	Mayo	St. Brigid's Park, Dowdallshill
2:30 p.m.	G Smyth 0–5 (3f), D Murphy 0–3 (1f), D Horan, D Kettle 1–0 each, S Callan, Donagh O'Sullivan 0–2 each, D McArdle, B Corcoran 0–1 each.	Report	K Feeney 0–8 (6f), D McTighe 2–0, N Murphy 1–0, D McDonnell, E Madigan 0–2 each.	Referee: S de Cleir (Kilkenny)

13 March 2011 Round 4	Donegal	1–07 – 1–13	Fingal	O'Donnell Park, Letterkenny
2:30 p.m.	JM Sheridan 0–7 (5f), Graham Dillon 1–0, D Byrne 0–2 (1f, 1 '65), D de Burca 0–2, A McEnerney, C O'Mahony 0–1 each.	Report	N Campbell 0–5 (3f), S McVeigh 1–0, E Organ, S Boyle 0–1 each.	Referee: E Hasson (Derry)

13 March 2011 Round 4	Sligo	1–12 – 2–08	Monaghan	Kilcoyne Park, Tubbercurry
2:30 p.m.	K Raymond 0–8 (4f, 1 '65'), D Loughnane 1–2, A Cawley and L Cadden 0–1 each.	Report	R Meegan 2–0, M McHugh 0–3 (3f), T Hillard 0–2, E MacSuibhne and S Leonard 0–1 each.	Referee: E O'Shaughnessy (Galway)

27 March 2011 Round 5	Fingal	0–16 – 1–12	Sligo	Lawless Memorial Park, Swords
2:30 p.m.	J Sheridan 0–12 (8f), B McCarthy 0–2, D Byrne, A Mc Inerney 0–1 each	Report	K Raymond 1–6 (5f), L Reidy 0–2, L Cadden, C Brennan, R Molloy, N Cadden 0–1 each	Referee: P Murphy (Carlow)

27 March 2011 Round 5	Monaghan	3–14 – 1–17	Roscommon	St. Tiernach's Park, Clones
2:30 p.m.	S Lambe 0–9 (8f), R Meegan 1–2, E Mac Suibhne 0–3, S Leonard 0–2, B McGuigan 0–1	Report	J Coyne 1–4, K Connelly 1–2, Gary Fallon 0–5 (4f), P Kelleghan 1–0, J Lawlor 0–2, D Nolan 0–1	Referee: F Smith (Meath)

27 March 2011 Round 5	Mayo	2–18 – 0–12	Donegal	McHale Park, Castlebar
2:30 p.m.	N Campbell 0–8 (6f), L Henderson 0–3 (2f), C Mathewson 0–1.	Report	K Higgins 1–5 (3f), K Feeney 1–4 (2f), S Broderick 0–5 (4f), R Cullinane, D McDonnell, S Hoban, N Murphy 0–1 each	Referee: C Browne (Galway)

2 April 2011 Round 6	Sligo	1–10 – 3–18	Mayo	Markievicz Park, Sligo
2:30 p.m.	K Raymond 1–6 (5f, 1 '65', 1–0 pen), R Molloy, T Conneely, D Tobin, D Loughnane 0–1 each	Report	S Broderick 0–8 (5f), S Hoban 2–0, N Murphy 1–2, R Cullinane, K Higgins (2f) 0–3 each, B Hunt, D McTighe 0–1 each	Referee: M Haverty (Galway)

3 April 2011 Round 6	Donegal	1–08 – 6–12	Louth	O'Donnell Park, Letterkenny
2:30 p.m.	N Campbell (0-5, 4f), L Henderson (1-0), S McVeigh (0-2), C Mathewson (0-1).		S Callan (2-3, 1-0f); D Horan (1-3); D O'Sullivan (1-2), B Corcoran (1-0), D O'Hanrahan (1-0), G Smith (0-3, 1f), D Murphy (0-1, 1f).	Referee: E Hassan (Derry)

3 April 2011 Round 6	Roscommon	w/o – scr.	Fingal	Athleague Sportsfield, Athleague
2:30 p.m.

10 April 2011 Round 7	Sligo	2–11 – 2–12	Donegal	Markievicz Park, Sligo
2:30 p.m.	K Raymond (0-7, 6f, 1 '65); Tom Conneely (1-0); D Burke (1-0), R Molloy (0-3), L Reidy (0-1, 1f),		N Campbell (0-9, 7f, 1 '65'), E McDermott (2-0), C Dowds (0-1); R McDermott (0-1), C Matthewson (0-1).	Referee: P Greene (Galway)

10 April 2011 Round 7	Roscommon	2–24 – 0–15	Louth	Athleague Sportsfield, Athleague
2:30 p.m.	Gary Fallon (0-10, 10f); J Coyne (2-3), M Kelly (0-3, 2f, 1 '65'), P Kelly (0-1), D Dolan (0-1, 1f); P Kelleghan (0-1), K Connelly (0-1), J Lawlor (0-1), A Moore (0-1), D Loughnane (0-1), M Keaveney (0-1).		D Murphy (0-4, 4f); D O'Sullivan (0-2), G Smyth (0-2, 2f), S Callan (0-2, 1 '65'); D McArdle (0-1), R Byrne (0-1), D Dunne (0-1), D Horan (0-1); B Corcoran (0-1).	Referee: M O'Connor (Limerick)

10 April 2011 Round 7	Monaghan	2–15 – 0–17	Mayo	St. Tiernach's Park, Clones
2:30 p.m.	M McHugh (1-6, 5f, 1 '65'), R Meegan (0-4), G Boyd (1-0); S Leonard (0-2), B McGuigan (0-2), E MacSuibhne (0-1);		S Broderick (0-8, 3f), K Feeney (0-4, 1f), E Madigan (0-2), C Freeman (0-2); S Hoban (0-1).

=== Knock-out stage ===
Final

17 April 2011 Final	Roscommon	0–17 – 1–12	Mayo	Páirc Seán Mac Diarmada, Carrick
	G Fallon (0-8, frees); K Conneely (0-3), D Nolan (0-2); P Kellehan (0-2), M Kelly (0-1), M Keaveney (0-1).	Report	S Broderick (0-6, frees), R Cullinane (1-1), C Freeman (0-2); N Murphy (0-2), E Madigan (0-1).	Referee: P Greene (Galway)

=== Scoring statistics ===
Top scorers overall

Rank	Player	County	Tally	Total	Matches	Average
1	Keith Raymond	Sligo	2-36	42	6	7.00
2	Noel Campbell	Donegal	1-38	41	6	6.83
3	Gary Fallon	Roscommon	0-38	38	6	6.33
4	Gerard Smyth	Louth	1-28	31	6	5.16
5	Johnny Coyne	Roscommon	5-15	30	6	5.00
6	Stephen Lambe	Monaghan	0-29	29	5	5.80
7	Stephen Broderick	Mayo	0-27	27	4	6.75
8	Kenny Feeney	Mayo	1-23	26	7	3.71
9	John Matthew Sheridan	Fingal	0-25	25	5	5.00
10	Shane Callan	Louth	3-12	21	6	3.50
10	Keith Higgins	Mayo	1-18	21	3	7.00

Top scorers in a single game

Rank	Player	County	Tally	Total	Opposition
1	Martin Ormonde	Fingal	2-08	14	Monaghan
2	John Matthew Sheridan	Fingal	0-12	12	Sligo
3	Gary Fallon	Roscommon	0-10	10	Louth
3	Keith Higgins	Mayo	0-10	10	Roscommon
5	Shane Callan	Louth	2-03	9	Donegal
5	Johnny Coyne	Roscommon	2-03	9	Louth
5	Mickey McHugh	Monaghan	1-06	9	Mayo
5	Keith Raymond	Sligo	1-06	9	Mayo
5	Keith Raymond	Sligo	1-06	9	Fingal
5	Stephen Lambe	Monaghan	0-09	9	Roscommon
5	Noel Campbell	Donegal	0-09	9	Sligo
5	Stephen Lambe	Monaghan	0-09	9	Fingal

== Division 4 ==
National Hurling League Division 4
- Season: 2011
- Champions: Tyrone; Captain: Seán Paul Begley; Manager: Tom Magill
- Relegated: Monaghan
- Matches: 16
- Top goalscorer: Eoin Donnellan (0-40)
- Biggest home win: Longford 6–23 – 1–01 Cavan (13 March 2011)
- Biggest away win: South Down 5–32 – 1–03 Cavan (27 March 2011)
- Highest scoring: Cavan 1–08 – 8–23 Fermanagh (13 February 2011)
- All statistics correct as of 12 April 2017.

Tyrone entered Division 4 as the relegated team from the 2010 season.

On 17 April 2011, Tyrone won the title following a 1–15 to 0–11 win over South Down in the final.

Longford's Eoin Donnellan was the Division 4 top scorer with 0-40.

=== Table ===
Division 4 Final

Team	Pld	W	D	L	Pts
Tyrone	5	4	1	0	9
South Down	5	4	0	1	8
Fermanagh	5	3	1	1	7
Longford	5	2	0	3	4
Leitrim	5	1	0	4	2
Cavan	5	0	0	5	0

=== Group stage ===
13 February 2011 Round 1	Longford	1–10 – 2–17	South Down	Pearse Park, Longford
2:30 p.m.	J O'Brien 0–6 (5f), S Hannon 1–0, E Donnellan (2f), J Casey 0–2 each.	Report	L Morgan 0–9 (7f), K Courtney, P McAleenan 1–0 each, P O'Neill ('45'), E McGuinness, M Magee (1f) 0–2 each, M McCartan, D Doherty 0–1 each	Referee: P Murphy (Carlow)

13 February 2011 Round 1	Cavan	1–08 – 8–23	Fermanagh	Breffni Park, Cavan
2:30 p.m.	N Hogan 0–6 (4f 1 '65), M O'Connell 1–0, J Rosney 0–2.	Report	B McGarry 3–3, S Corrigan 3–1, J Duffy 1–3, R Bogue (4f), S Curran (2f 1 '65) 0–6 each, F McBrien 1–2, P McGoldrick, S Mulholland 0–1.	Referee: G Duffy (Antrim)

13 February 2011 Round 1	Tyrone	2–19 – 0–09	Leitrim	Healy Park, Omagh
2:30 p.m.	A Kelly 0–9 (6f, 1 '65'), J Kelly 0–5, S McIver 1–1, C Grogan 1–0, C McErlean 0–3 (1f), and B Winters 0–1	Report	C Cunniffe 0–6 (4f, 1 '65), D McGovern, M Lane, D Ryan 0–1 each	Referee: F Smith (Meath)

20 February 2011 Round 2	South Down	3–11 – 3–15	Tyrone	Fontenoy Park
1:00 p.m.	L Morgan 1–4 (1–2f), E Donnelly, M Magee 1–1 each, M Cunningham 0–4, P McAleenan 0–1.	Report	C McErlean 0–8 (5f), A Kelly 1–2 (1f), C Grogan 1–1 (1f), Rory O'Neill 1–0, J Kelly 0–2, S McLoughnery, P Begley 0–1 each.	Referee: G Duffy (Antrim)

20 February 2011 Round 2	Leitrim	3–19 – 1–08	Cavan	Ballinamore
2:30 p.m.	M Lane 1–7 (2f), C Cunniffe 0–5 (1f, 1 '65'), D McGovern 0–4, M Dolly, D Kennedy 1–0 each, B Feeney 0–2, E Walsh 0–1.	Report	C O'Neill 0–6 (5f), M McEntee 1–0, J Rosney 0–2 (1f).	Referee: C Groome (Offaly)

20 February 2011 Round 2	Fermanagh	2–14 – 1–07	Longford	Irvinestown
2:30 p.m.	R Bogue 0–5 (5f), J Duffy 1–2, S Mulholland 1–1, S Corrigan, B McGarry 0–2 each, S Curran, O Boyle 0–1 each	Report	E Donnellan 0–4 (3f, 1 '65'), Morrissey 1–0, J O'Brien 0–3 (3f).	Referee: A Nash (Derry)

6 March 2011 Round 3	Cavan	1–06 – 4–23	Tyrone	Breffni Park, Cavan
2:30 p.m.	M McEntee (1-0), J Rosney (0-3, 3f), M Carr (0-2, 2f), B Devine (0-1, 1f).		R O'Neill (3-2), S McLoughney (1-2), J Kelly (0-5, 5f); A Kelly (0-4, 1f, 1 '65), P O'Connor (0-4, 1f), C Grogan (0-2), C McErlean (0-1), S O'Hagan (0-1), N O'Neill (0-1), P Lavery (0-1).	Referee: M Haverty (Galway)

6 March 2011 Round 3	Fermanagh	2–11 – 4–13	South Down	Brewster Park, Enniskillen
2:30 p.m.	R Bogue (1-7, 1-5f), M Slevin (1-1); S Corrigan (0-3).		E McGuinness (2-3), P O'Neill (0-7, 4f, 3 '65s'); L Morgan (1-0); E Donnelly (1-0), M Cunningham (0-2), N Burns (0-1).	Referee: P Greene (Galway)

6 March 2011 Round 3	Leitrim	3–08 – 2–15	Longford	Páirc Sheáin Mhic Dhiarmada, Carrick
2:30 p.m.	S Moran (1-1), D McGovern (0-4, 3f), P McWeeney (1-0), M Quinn (1-0), M Lane (0-3).		E Donnellan (0-10, 7f), Joe O'Brien (1-2, 2f), P Cullen (1-0); M Morrissey (0-2), A Corcoran (0-1).	Referee: C Brown (Galway)

13 March 2011 Round 4	South Down	6–11 – 1–11	Leitrim	Fontenoy Park
2:30 p.m.	A Brown (2-2), E McGuinness (2-0), M Magee (1-3), J Murphy (1-0), P O'Neill (0-3, 2f); C Beattie (0-1), L Morgan (0-1); P McAleenan (0-1).		D McGovern (1-6, 5f, 1 '65', 1-0 '65'), M Lane (0-4, 3f), M Dolan (0-1).	Referee: C Groome (Offaly)

13 March 2011 Round 4	Tyrone	1–10 – 3–04	Fermanagh	O'Neill Park, Dungannon
2:30 p.m.	J Kelly (1-5, 4f); C Grogan (0-2), S McKiver (0-1), A Kelly (0-1); C McErlean (0-1).		J Duffy (2-1), S Corrigan (1-0), R Bogue (0-2, 1f), B McGarry (0-1).	Referee: G Duffy (Antrim)

13 March 2011 Round 4	Longford	6–23 – 1–01	Cavan	Michael Fay Park, Longford
2:30 p.m.	E Donnellan (0-17, 13f), J Minnock (3-1), M Morrissey (1-2), K Murray (1-0), P Cullen (1-0), J Newman (0-1); R Donnellan (0-1), S Ward (0-1).		M Donaghy (1-0), J Rosney (0-1).	Referee: J O'Mahoney (Limerick)

27 March 2011 Round 5	Cavan	1–03 – 5–32	South Down	Ballyconnell
2:30 p.m.	C Drumm 1–0, J Rosney 0–3 (2f, 1 '65').	Report	E McGuinness 3–3, L Deegan 2–4, J O'Kane 0–6 (6f), L Morgan (3f), P O'Neill (2 '65', 2f) 0–5 each, M Cunningham 0–3, J Murphy (1 '65'), A Gough 0–2 each, T Mason, C Teague 0–1 each	Referee: P O'Dwyer (Carlow)

27 March 2011 Round 5	Leitrim	1–09 – 4–19	Fermanagh	Ballinamore
2:30 p.m.	M Lane 1–6 (4f), D McGovern 0–1f, G Hickey 0–2f	Report	B McGarry 2–2, S Corrigan 1–3 (1f), J Duffy 1–0, R Bogue 0–5 (3f), F McBrien 0–3, P Timoney 0–2, A Breslin, M Slevin, D McGarry, J P McGarry, 0–1 each	Referee: M Haverty (Galway)

27 March 2011 Round 5	Tyrone	4–26 – 1–08	Longford	Healy Park, Omagh
2:30 p.m.	J Kelly 2–9 (1–4f), C McErlean 2–2, A Kelly 0–6 (2 '65), G Fox 0–5, S O'Hagan 0–2, S McLoughney, M Grogan 0–1 each	Report	J Casey 1–0, E Donnellan 0–7 (4f), E Daly 0–1 (f).	Referee: O Elliot (Antrim)

=== Knock-out stage ===
Final

17 April 2011 Final	Tyrone	1–15 – 0–11	South Down	Athletic Grounds, Armagh
	R O'Neill 1-4, C McErlean 0-4 (2f), C Grogan, J Kelly (1f) 0-2 each, G Fox, A Kelly, P O'Connor 0-1 each.	Report	L Morgan 0-7 (6f), P O'Neill 0-2 (1 '65'), P McAleenan, M Cunningham 0-1 each.	Referee: O Elliot (Antrim)

=== Scoring statistics ===
Top scorers overall

Rank	Player	County	Tally	Total	Matches	Average
1	Eoin Donnellan	Longford	0-40	40	5	8.00
2	Justin Kelly	Tyrone	3-28	37	6	6.16
3	Liam Morgan	South Down	2-26	32	6	5.33
4	Eoin McGuinness	South Down	7-08	29	6	4.83
5	Aidan Kelly	Tyrone	1-23	26	6	4.33

Top scorers in a single game

Rank	Player	County	Tally	Total	Opposition
1	Eoin Donnellan	Longford	0-17	17	Cavan
2	Justin Kelly	Tyrone	2-09	15	Longford
3	Brendan McGarry	Fermanagh	3-03	12	Cavan
3	Eoin McGuinness	South Down	3-03	12	Cavan
5	Ryan O'Neill	Tyrone	3-02	11	Cavan
6	Seán Corrigan	Fermanagh	3-01	10	Cavan
6	John Minnock	Longford	3-01	10	Cavan
6	Liam Deegan	South Down	2-04	10	Cavan
6	Michael Lane	Leitrim	1-07	10	Cavan
6	Ryan Bogue	Fermanagh	1-07	10	South Down
6	Eoin Donnellan	Longford	0-10	10	Leitrim
