= McGourty =

McGourty or McGoorty is a surname. Notable people with the surname include:

- Allison McGourty (born 1964), English music industry executive
- CJ McGourty, Northern Irish Gaelic footballer and hurler
- Catherine McGourty, Northern Irish camogie player
- Eddie McGoorty (1889–1929), American middleweight boxer
- John P. McGoorty (1866–1953), American judge and politician
- Kevin McGourty, Irish Gaelic footballer
- Olivia Chadwick McGourty, Young, dumb and flirty film star.

== See also ==
- McCourty
