= 2009 All-Ireland Under-21 Hurling Championship =

All-Ireland Under-21 Hurling Championship 2009
Championship Details
- Dates: 20 May – 13 September 2009
- Teams: 17

All Ireland Champions
- Winners: Clare (1st win)
- Captain: Ciarán O'Doherty
- Manager: John Minogue

All Ireland Runners-up
- Runners-up: Kilkenny
- Captain: David Langton
- Manager: Michael Walsh

Provincial Champions
- Munster: Clare
- Leinster: Kilkenny
- Ulster: Antrim
- Connacht: Not Played

Championship Statistics
- Matches Played: 16
- Total Goals: 54 (3.37 per game)
- Total Points: 497 (31.06 per game)
- Top Scorer: Colin Ryan (3-33)

The 2009 All-Ireland Under-21 Hurling Championship was the 46th staging of the All-Ireland Under-21 Hurling Championship since its establishment by the Gaelic Athletic Association in 1964. The championship began on 20 May 2009 and ended on 13 September 2009.

Kilkenny entered the championship as the defending champions.

On 13 September 2009, Clare won the championship following a 0-15 to 0-14 defeat of Kilkenny in the All-Ireland final. This was their first All-Ireland title in the under-21 grade.

== Results ==
=== Leinster Under-21 Hurling Championship ===
Quarter-finals

20 May 2015 Quarter-final	Kilkenny	1-21 - 1-10	Laois	Nowlan Park
	M Bergin 0-10, M Kelly 0-4, C Fennelly 1-0, J Dowling 0-2, J Mulhall 0-2, J Nolan 0-1, N Cleere 0-1, P Murphy 0-1.		W Hylan 1-6, J O'Loughlin 0-2, B Galvin 0-1, M Whelan 0-1.	Referee: D Hughes (Carlow)

26 May 2009 Quarter-final	Kildare	1-2 - 1-10	Dublin	Conneff Park
	J Meehan 1-0, M Fitzgerald 0-1, P Fitzgerald 0-1.		K Warren 1-0, E McCabe 0-3, D Whelan 0-2, D Treacy 0-2, S Lambert 0-1, L Rushe 0-1, R Walsh 0-1.	Referee: J Kelly (Wexford)

Semi-finals

10 June 2009 Semi-final	Dublin	1-24 - 0-8	Wexford	Parnell Park
	P Garbutt (0-9, seven frees), P Kelly (0-4), L Rushe (0-4), D Treacy (1-0), C Clinton (0-3), B O’Rorke (0-3), D O’Connor (0-1).	Report	H Kehoe (0-3, two frees), A Shore (0-1, free), C Kennelly (0-1), J Gahan (0-1), J Cullen (0-1), S Foley (0-1).	Referee: B Gavin (Offaly)

10 June 2009 Semi-final	Kilkenny	0-18 - 0-15	Offaly	Nowlan Park
	R Hogan (0-6, three frees, one 65), M Kelly (0-3), J Mulhall (0-3), C Fennelly (0-2), J Farrell (0-2), M Walsh (0-1), J Nolan (0-1).	Report	J Gorman (0-3), D Currams (0-3, two frees), O Kealey (0-3), C Mahon (0-3), M Egan (0-2, frees), B Leonard (0-1).	Referee: F Smith (Meath)

Final

15 July 2009 Final	Dublin	1-19 - 2-20	Kilkenny	Parnell Park
	P Kelly (1-3), S Lambert (0-4, two 65s, free), C Clinton (0-3), D Treacy 0-3, two frees), L Rushe (0-2), B O’Rorke (0-2), P Garbutt (0-1, free), M May (0-1).	Report	JJ Farrell (2-2), R Hogan (0-5, four frees), M Bergin (0-4), J Mulhall (0-4), J Nolan (0-2), L Ryan (0-2), M Kelly (0-1).	Referee: T Carroll (Offaly)

=== Munster Under-21 Hurling Championship ===
Quarter-final

3 June 2009 Quarter-final	Tipperary	2-22 - 0-25	Cork	Semple Stadium
	P Bourke 1-9 (1-0 pen, 5f, 1 65), S Callanan 0-6 (1f, 1 65), S Bourke 1-1, J O’Neill 0-3, N McGrath 0-2, M Gleeson 0-1.	Report	P Horgan 0-12 (9f), L McLoughlin & L Desmond (1 sl) 0-3 each, P Gould & L O’Farrell 0-2 each, S White, W Egan & A Walsh 0-1 each.

Semi-finals

15 July 2009 Semi-final	Clare	4-22 - 2-13	Limerick	Cusack Park
	C Ryan 3-9 (1-0 pen, 0-5f), D Honan 1-4, C Morey, C O’Donovan, N O’Connell (0-1f) 0-2 each, S Collins, L Markham, C Quinn 0-1 each.	Report	S Tobin 0-7 (0-7f), T O’Brien 1-2, S O’Donnell 1-1, P Browne 0-2, B O’Brien 0-1.	Referee: C McAllister (Cork)

15 July 2009 Semi-final	Waterford	3-21 - 2-14	Tipperary	Fraher Field
	M Shanahan (0-13), T Ryan (2-0), T Connors (1-1), P Murray (0-3), S Casey (0-2), D O’Sullivan (0-1), B O’Sullivan (0-1).	Report	N McGrath (0-7), P Bourke (1-2), M Heffernan (1-0), J O’Neill (0-2), K Maher (0-1), S Callanan (0-1), S Burke (0-1).

Final

29 July 2015 Final	Waterford	2-12 - 2-17	Clare	Fraher Field
	M Shanahan 0-6 (0-5f), S Casey 1-3, T Ryan 1-1 (0-1 sideline), A Power (0-1f), J Gorman 0-1 each.	Report	D Honan 2-2, C Ryan 0-7 (0-4f), N O’Connell (0-3f), C O’Donovan 0-3 each, C Morey, J Conlon 0-1 each.	Attendance: 6,635; Referee: D Honan (Cork)

=== Ulster Under-21 Hurling Championship ===
Quarter-final

15 July 2009 Quarter-final	Armagh	3-18 - 1-3	Monaghan

Semi-finals

22 July 2009 Semi-final	Derry	3-15 - 3-9	Down	Casement Park
	A Kelly 3-2; S Dodds 0-7; G O'Neill 0-3; J P Clerry 0-2; S McCloskey, O McCloskey 0-1 each.	Report	S Nicholson 2-0; J Coyle 1-2; C Woods 0-4; A Higgins 0-2; C Oprey 0-1.	Referee: R Matthews (Antrim)

22 July 2009 Semi-final	Armagh	1-11 - 5-25	Antrim	Athletic Grounds
	J Corvan 0-4 (0-4f), P McBride 1-0, M Lennon, M Moan 0-2 each, F Woods, C Devlin, D O'Hanlon 0-1 each.	Report	CJ McGourty 1-7 (0-3f), E McCloskey 1-5, D Hamill 1-3, M Armstrong 1-2, P Doherty 0-3, A McCaffrey 1-0, C McKinley, J Campbell, R Donnelly, KB McShane, PJ O'Connell 0-1 each.	Referee: D Carr (Down)

Final

29 July 2009 Final	Antrim	1-18 - 0-9	Derry	Casement Park
	CJ McGourty 1-6 (5f); R Donnelly 0-3; PJ O'Connell, E McCloskey, N McManus 0-2 each; P Doherty, D Hamill, P McNaughton 0-1 each.	Report	S Dodds 0-5f; A Kelly 0-2; C McElhinny, Cormac McKenna 0-1 each.	Referee: G Devlin (Armagh)

=== All-Ireland Under-21 Hurling Championship ===
Semi-finals

22 August 2009 Semi-final	Kilkenny	2-22 - 2-7	Antrim	Páirc Tailteann
	R Hogan (0-14, eight frees, 2 65s), J Mulhall (1-1), JJ Farrell (1-1), P Murphy (0-2, one free), Liam Ryan (0-2), M Bergin (0-1), N Cleere (0-1).	Report	E McCloskey (1-1), D Hamill (1-0), P Doherty (0-2, frees), D McClean (0-1), CJ McGourty (0-1), N McManus (0-1), R Donnelly (0-1).	Referee: A Stapleton (Laois)

22 August 2009 Semi-final	Clare	3-23 - 5-15 (aet)	Galway	Semple Stadium
	D Honan (2-4), C Ryan (0-8, four frees, two 65s), C McGrath (1-1), J Conlon (0-3), S Collins (0-2), C Tierney (0-2), N O’Connell (0-1, free), C O’Donovan (0-1), C Morey (0-1).	Report	J Canning (4-7, 2-0 pens, 1-3 frees, 0-2 sideline, one 65), A Harte (1-2), E Forde (0-3), A Dolan (0-1), D Burke (0-1), N Quinn (0-1).	Referee: C McAllister (Cork)

Final

13 September 2009 Final	Clare	0-15 - 0-14	Kilkenny	Croke Park
	C Ryan 0-9 (0-8f, 0-1 ‘65), J Conlon 0-3, C O’Donovan 0-2, C Morey 0-1.	Report	R Hogan 0-5 (0-1f), M Kelly 0-3, J Mulhall, C Fennelly, J Nolan 0-2 each.	Referee: C McAllister (Cork)

== Top scorers ==
Overall

Rank	Player	County	Tally	Total	Matches	Average
1	Colin Ryan	Clare	3-33	42	4	10.50
2	Richie Hogan	Kilkenny	0-30	30	4	7.50
3	Darach Honan	Clare	5-10	25	4	6.25
4	C. J. McGourty	Antrim	2-14	20	3	6.66
5	Joe Canning	Galway	4-7	19	1	19.00
5	Maurice Shanahan	Waterford	0-19	19	2	9.50
7	Pa Bourke	Tipperary	2-11	17	2	8.50
8	John Mulhall	Kilkenny	1-12	15	5	3.00
8	Mark Bergin	Kilkenny	0-15	15	5	3.00
10	Jonjo Farrell	Kilkenny	3-5	14	5	2.80

Single game

Rank	Player	County	Tally	Total	Opposition
1	Joe Canning	Galway	4-7	19	Clare
2	Colin Ryan	Clare	3-9	18	Limerick
3	Richie Hogan	Kilkenny	0-14	14	Antrim
4	Maurice Shanahan	Waterford	0-13	13	Tipperary
5	Pa Bourke	Tipperary	1-9	12	Cork
5	Patrick Horgan	Cork	0-12	12	Tipperary
7	Aaron Kelly	Derry	3-2	11	Down
8	Darach Honan	Clare	2-4	10	Galway
8	C. J. McGourty	Antrim	1-7	10	Armagh
8	Mark Bergin	Kilkenny	0-10	10	Laois

== Top goalkeepers ==
Clean sheets

Rank	Goalkeeper	County	Clean sheets
1	Colin McGrath	Kilkenny	2
1	James Demspey	Offaly	1
1	Finn McGarry	Dublin	1
1	Bill McCormack	Tipperary	1
1	C O'Connell	Antrim	1

== Championship statistics ==
=== Miscellaneous ===
- After losing twelve provincial finals throughout the history of the competition, Clare finally triumph and claim their first Munster title. The team subsequently progresses to claim their first ever All-Ireland title.
- The All-Ireland final is the first ever championship meeting between Clare and Kilkenny.
