= 2009–10 All-Ireland Senior Club Football Championship =

Irish Football Championship

- Dates: 18 October 2009 – 17 March 2010
- Teams: 32
- Sponsor: Allied Irish Bank
- Champions: St Gall's (1st title); Colin Brady (captain); Lenny Harbinson (manager)
- Runners-up: Kilmurry Ibrickane; Enda Coughlan (captain); Michéal McDermott (manager)

Tournament statistics
- Top scorer(s): C. J. McGourty (2-28)

The 2009–10 All-Ireland Senior Club Football Championship was the 40th staging of the All-Ireland Senior Club Football Championship since its establishment by the Gaelic Athletic Association in 1970-71. The competition began on 18 October 2009 and ended on 17 March 2010.

The defending champion was Kilmacud Crokes; however, the club did not qualify after being beaten by Ballyboden St Enda's in a semi-final replay of the 2009 Dublin County Championship.

On 17 March 2010, St Gall's won the competition following a 0-13 to 1-5 defeat of Kilmurry-Ibrickane in the All-Ireland final at Croke Park. It remains their only championship title.

C. J. McGourty of the St Gall's club was the competition's top scorer with 2-28.

== Connacht ==
=== Quarter-final ===
18 October 2009 Quarter-final	Tourlestrane	1-06 - 1-12	Castlerea St Kevin's	Markievicz Park
	G McGowan (1-1), J Leonard (0-2, one free), S King (0-1), G Gaughan (0-1 free), J Marren (0-1).		G Heneghan (0-9, six frees), N Dineen (1-0), D Scahill (0-1), S Heneghan (0-1), E Kenny (0-1), S Stenson (0-1).

=== Semi-finals ===
8 November 2009 Semi-final	Castlerea St Kevin's	0-11 - 1-09	Charlestown Sarsfields	Kiltoom
	G Heneghan 0-6 (4f, 1 '65), N Dinneen 0-2, S Ryan, S Heneghan, J Duggan 0-1 each.	Report	O Conway 1-1, T Mulligan 0-3, P Mulligan (2f), T Parson 0-2 each, R Haran 0-1 (1f).

8 November 2009 Semi-final	Corofin	2-13 - 0-09	Glencar–Manorhamilton	Tuam Stadium
	K Comer 1-3 (0-3 frees), M Farragher 1-2, C McGrath 0-2, R Steede 0-2; A Donnellan 0-1; J Canney 0-1, A Burke 0-1, S Monaghan 0-1.		J Glancy 0-5 (4 frees), G Hickey 0-1, B McDonald 0-1; A Hickey 0-1; D Poniard 0-1.

=== Final ===
28 November 2009 Final	Charlestown Sarsfields	0-07 - 2-14	Corofin	Fr. O'Hara Park
	R Haran (0-1f), P Mulligan (0-2f) 0-3 each, T Parsons 0-1.	Report	K Comer 1-7 (0-6f), G Sice 1-0, J Canney 0-2, A O'Donovan, S Monaghan, M Farragher, C McGrath, G Higgins all 0-1 each.

== Leinster ==
=== First round ===
25 October 2009 First round	Portlaoise	2-21 - 0-02	Mattock Rangers	Drogheda Park
	B Fitzgerald 1-4 (0-1f), P Cahillane 1-2 (0-2f), C Rogers 0-4, Z Tuohy 0-3 (1f), B McCormack, P McNulty 0-2 each, B Mulligan, K Lillis, A Kelly, R Maher 0-1 each.		D Reid (f), C Grimes (f) 0-1 each.

25 October 2009 First round	St. Laurence's	2-08 - 1-12	Clara	St. Conleth's Park
	J Fogarty, R Lawlor 1-2 each, B Mackey 0-2 (2f), T O'Neill, D Lawlor 0-1 each.	Report	J Reynolds, T Deehan (5f) 0-5 each, E Brady 1-0, J O'Hara, R Brady 0-1 each.

25 October 2009 First round	Clonguish	2-10 - 0-05	Horeswood	Pearse Park
	P Barden 1-4; Williams 1-1; C Clarke 0-3 (3f); D Barden, P Dowd ('45) 0-1 each.	Report	N Collins, David Shannon, C Deely (1f), PJ Banville (1f), Darren Shannon 0-1 each.

=== Quarter-finals ===
8 November 2009 Quarter-final	Portlaoise	3-12 - 1-06	Seneschalstown	O'Moore Park
	P Cahillane 2-1, B Glynn 1-2, B Fitzgerald 0-5, P McNulty 0-2, A Fennelly 0-1, K Lillie 0-1.		S Sheridan 1-0, B Sheridan 0-2, S Clarke 0-2, J Sheridan 0-1, S Finnegan 0-1.

8 November 2009 Quarter-final	Clara	0-14 - 1-08	Rathvilly	O'Connor Park
	T Deehan 0-10, J O'Hara 0-2, R Brady 0-1, S Brady 0-1.		D Nolan 1-1, JJ Smith 0-4, Brian Murphy 0-3.

8 November 2009 Quarter-final	Clonguish	0-15 - 1-14 (aet)	Garrycastle	Pearse Park
	D Barden 0-5, P Barden 0-4, P Dowd 0-3, D Faughnan 0-1, J O'Brien 0-1, C Clarke 0-1.		D Dolan 1-5, G Doland 0-3, J Duignan 0-3, S O'Donoghue 0-1, E Mulvihill 0-1, S O'Reilly 0-1.

8 November 2009 Quarter-final	Ballyboden St. Enda's	1-10 - 1-07	Rathnew	Parnell Park
	C Keaney 0-5 (3f), D Shovlin 1-0, A Kerin (f), D O'Mahony, S Lambert, K Naughton, P Galvin 0-1 each.		T Gill 0-5 (5f), L Glynn 1-1, N Mernagh 0-1.

=== Semi-finals ===
22 November 2009 Semi-final	Garrycastle	1-08 - 0-06	Ballyboden St. Enda's	Cusack Park
	M McCallon 1-0; D Dolan 0-3; P Dillon (f); P Mulvihill, J Duignan, G Dolan, D O'Shaughnessy 0-1 each.		A Kerin 0-2 (1f); G Hiney, S Lambert, C Smyth; C Keaney (0-1 '45') 0-1 each.

28 November 2009 Semi-final	Portlaoise	1-09 - 0-03	Clara	O'Moore Park
	P Cahillane 1-3 (1-0 pen), B Fitzgerald (2f), P McNulty 0-2 each, B Smyth, J Fennell 0-1 each.	Report	J O'Hara, T Deehan (1f), S Deehan 0-1 each.

=== Final ===
6 December 2009 Final	Portlaoise	1-09 - 1-05	Garrycastle	O'Connor Park
	B Fitzgerald 1-2 (0-1f), P Cahillane 0-2, C Rogers 0-2, K Fitzpatrick 0-1, A Fennelly 0-1, C Byrne 0-1.	Report	G Dolan 1-1, P Dillon 0-2 (1f), D Dolan 0-1f, S O’Donoghue 0-1.

== Munster ==
=== Quarter-finals ===
8 November 2009 Quarter-final	Kerins O'Rahilly's	1-11 - 0-10	Clonakilty	Austin Stack Park
	BJ Walsh 1-3; D Quill 0-4 (0-1 free); T Walsh 0-2; R O’Callaghan, BJ Keane (free) 0-1 each.	Report	C Callanan (frees), C O’Donovan (frees) 0-4 each; C McManus 0-2.

8 November 2009 Quarter-final	Kilmurry-Ibrickane	0-11 - 0-05	Dromcollogher/Broadford	Quilty
	S Moloney 0-4, O O’Dwyer 0-2, J Daly 0-2f, P O’Dwyer, I McInerney and M Hogan 0-1 each.	Report	G Noonan 0-2, M Reidy 0-2, (0-1f) and P Donnelly 0-1f.

=== Semi-finals ===
22 November 2009 Semi-final	Kerins O'Rahilly's	1-08 - 0-09	Moyle Rovers	Austin Stack Park
	D Quill 1-2; BJ Walsh and BJ Keane 0-2 each; T O’Sullivan and J O’Connor (free) 0-1 each.		D Browne 0-5 (0-4 frees, 0-1 ‘45); S Keating, S Carey, P Acheson and J Williams 0-1 each.

22 November 2009 Semi-final	Stradbally	0-06 - 0-09	Kilmurry-Ibrickane	Fraher Field
	N Curran 0-3f, S Aherne 0-2f, P Weldon 0-1	Report	O O’Dwyer 0-5f, I McInerney 0-2, N Downes 0-1, E Coughlan 0-1

=== Final ===
6 December 2009 Final	Kilmurry-Ibrickane	0-07 - 0-06	Kerins O'Rahilly's	Gaelic Grounds
	I McInerney 0-3 (0-2 frees); S Moloney, P O’Connor, S Hickey and E Talty 0-1 each.	Report	D Quill 0-3 (0-2 frees); D Moran 0-2; J O’Connor 0-1.

== Ulster ==
=== Preliminary round ===
18 October 2009 Quarter-final	Cavan Gaels	1-10 - 1-12	St Gall's	Kingspan Breffni Park
	N Walsh (1-1), S Johnston (0-3); N Murray (0-1), D Reilly (0-1), D Graham (0-1); C Collins (0-1), P Smith (0-1), P O'Donnell (0-1).	Report	CJ McGourty (1-4, two frees), K Stewart (0-3), R Gallagher (0-2), S Kelly (0-2), T O'Neill (0-1).

=== Quarter-finals ===
8 November 2009 Quarter-final	St. Patrick's	1-10 - 1-06	Derrygonnelly Harps	Celtic Park
	P McFlynn 0-5 (3f), A McAlynn 1-0, D McVey 0-2, J McBride, S McFlynn (0-1f), G Mallon 0-1 each.	Report	R Jones 0-4 (0-4f), P Gallagher 1-0, P Ward (0-1f), K Cassidy 0-1 each.

8 November 2009 Quarter-final	Kilcoo	0-13 - 0-09	St Eunan's	Pairc Esler
	P Devlin (0-6, 0-1 free), D Kane (0-3 frees), B Kane (0-2), A Devlin (0-1), M McClean (0-1).		C Dunne (0-4, 0-2 frees), B Devenney (0-2), K Rafferty (0-1); M McGowan (0-1), C Sharkey (0-1).

8 November 2009 Quarter-final	Clontibret O'Neills	0-10 - 0-08	Dromore St Dympna's	St Tiernach's Park
	C McManus 0-5 (4f), P McGuigan 0-2 (1f), JP Mone 0-2, F Mone 0-1,	Report	E McCusker 0-4 (2f), C McCullagh 0-3 (3f), Sean O'Neill 0-1.

8 November 2009 Quarter-final	St Gall's	0-10 - 0-08	Pearse Óg	Casement Park
	CJ McGourty (0-3, 0-2 frees), Kieran McGourty (0-2), K Stewart (0-1), Rory Gallagher (0-1), S Kelly (0-1); S Burke (0-1), K Niblock (0-1 free).		P Duffy (0-2, one 45), Ronan Clarke (0-2), D McManus (0-1); M Cullen (0-1 free), S Moore (0-1), C Clarke (0-1, free).

=== Semi-finals ===
15 November 2009 Semi-final	St. Patrick's	1-12 - 1-11	Kilcoo	Casement Park
	P Young (1-2), P McVey (0-5, 5f), P McFlynn (0-2, 2f); Declan McVey (0-1), J McBride (0-1), B Doyle (0-1).		D Kane (1-5), D McEvoy (0-2), P Devlin (0-2, 2f), C Laverty (0-1); B Kane (0-1).

15 November 2009 Semi-final	Clontibret O'Neills	0-11 - 2-15	St Gall's	Athletic Grounds
	C McManus (0-9, 0-7 frees), A Rooney, F Mone (0-1 each).	Report	R Gallagher (2-3, 0-1 free), Kieran McGourty (0-3), C J McGourty (0-3, 0-2 frees), K Niblock (0-2), K Stewart, S Kelly, Kevin McGourty, T O’Neill (0-1 each).

=== Final ===
29 November 2009 Final	St Gall's	0-16 - 0-05	St. Patrick's	Pairc Esler
	CJ McGourty 0-6 (5f), K Niblock, R Gallagher (1f) 0-2 each, A Gallagher, S Burke, K McGourty, A Healy, T O'Neill, S Burns 0-1 each.	Report	P McVey 0-2 (2f), J McBride (f) P McFlynn (f), C Devlin 0-1 each.

== Quarter-final ==
24 January 2010 Quarter-final	Tír Chonaill Gaels	0-03 - 1-04	Kilmurry-Ibrickane	Emerald GAA Grounds
	K Downes (f), K McMenamin (f), M Sweeney 0-1 each.	Report	J Daly 1-1 (0-1f); I McInerney, N Downes, P O'Dwyer 0-1 each.

== Semi-finals ==
21 February 2010 Semi-final	Kilmurry-Ibrickane	1-14 - 0-08	Portlaoise	Gaelic Grounds
	N Downes 1-2, I McInerney 0-4 (0-3f, 0-1 '45), M O'Dwyer 0-3, J Daly 0-2 (0-2f), E Coughlan, O O'Dwyer and P O'Dwyer 0-1 each.	Report	P Cahillane 0-3 (0-2f), B McCormack, B Fitzgerald (0-2f) 0-2 each, C Healy 0-1.

27 February 2010 Semi-final	St Gall's	1-15 - 1-11 (aet)	Corofin	Parnell Park
	C McGourty 1-9 (0-8f), S Kelly 0-2, P Veronica 0-1, S Burke 0-1, Kevin McGourty 0-1, Kieran McGourty 0-1.	Report	K Comer 1-6 (0-5f), A O’Donovan 0-3 (2f), D Morris 0-1, G Sice 0-1.

== Final ==
17 March 2010 Final	St Gall's	0-13 - 1–05	Kilmurry-Ibrickane	Croke Park, Dublin
	C McGourty 0-3 (1f), K Niblock, Kevin McGourty 0-2 each, A Gallagher, T O'Neill, Rory Gallagher, Kieran McGourty, A Healy, S Burke 0-1 each.	Report	S Moloney 1-3 (1f), M O'Dwyer 0-1, J Daly 0-1 (f)	Attendance: 34,357; Referee: D Fahy (Longford)

== Statistics ==
=== Top scorers ===
Overall

Rank	Player	Club	Tally	Total	Matches	Average
1	C. J. McGourty	St Gall's	2-28	34	6	5.66
2	Kieran Comer	Corofin	3-16	25	3	8.33
3	Paul Cahillane	Portlaoise	4-11	23	5	4.60
4	Barry Fitzgerald	Portlaoise	2-15	21	5	4.20
5	Thomas Deehan	Clara	0-16	16	3	5.33
6	Ger Heneghan	Castlerea St Kevin's	0-15	15	2	7.50
7	Conor McManus	Clontibret O'Neills	0-14	14	2	7.00
8	Rory Gallagher	St Gall's	2-07	13	6	2.16
9	Dessie Dolan	Garrycastle	1-09	12	3	4.00
9	Declan Quill	Kerins O'Rahilly's	1-09	12	3	4.00

In a single game

Rank	Player	Club	Tally	Total	Opposition
1	C. J. McGourty	St Gall's	1-09	12	Corofin
2	Kieran Comer	Corofin	1-07	10	Charlestown Sarsfields
2	Thomas Deehan	Clara	0-10	10	Rathvilly
3	Rory Gallagher	St Gall's	2-03	9	Clontibret O'Neills
3	Kieran Comer	Corofin	1-06	9	St Gall's
3	Ger Heneghan	Castlerea St Kevin's	0-09	9	Tourlestrane
3	Conor McManus	Clontibret O'Neills	0-09	9	St Gall's
4	Dessie Dolan	Garrycastle	1-05	8	Clonguish
4	Donal Kane	Kilcoo	1-05	8	St Patrick's
5	Paul Cahillane	Portlaoise	2-01	7	Seneschalstown
5	Barry Fitzgerald	Portlaoise	1-04	7	Mattock Rangers
5	Paul Barden	Clonguish	1-04	7	Horeswood
5	C. J. McGourty	St Gall's	1-04	7	Cavan Gaels

=== Miscellaneous ===
- Portlaoise became the first team to win seven Leinster Club Championship titles.
