= McCoury =

McCoury is a surname. Notable people with the surname include:

- Del McCoury (born 1939), American musician and singer
- Rob McCoury, American bluegrass musician
- Ronnie McCoury (born 1967), American musician, singer, and songwriter

== See also ==
- McCourt
- McCourty
