= Ciarán O'Doherty =

Irish hurler

Personal information
- Nickname: Doc
- Born: 1 March 1988 (age 38) Crusheen, County Clare, Ireland

Sport
- Sport: Hurling
- Position: Left corner-back
Club
- Years: Club
- Crusheen
Club titles
- Clare titles: 2
Inter-county*
Years	County	Apps (scores)
2016	Clare	0 (0-00)
Inter-county titles
- Munster titles: 0
- All-Irelands: 0
- NHL: 1
- All Stars: 0
- *Inter County team apps and scores correct as of 13:37, 9 June 2023.

Ciarán O'Doherty (born 1 March 1988) is an Irish hurler. At club level he plays with Crusheen, while he has also lined out at inter-county level with various Clare teams.

== Career ==
O'Doherty first played hurling to a high standard as a student at St. Flannan's College in Ennis. He was a member of the Flannan's team that beat Thurles CBS to win the Harty Cup title in 2005, before later defeating St Kieran's College to claim All-Ireland honours. O'Doherty later lined out at adult club level with Crusheen and won back-to-back Clare SHC titles in 2010 and 2011. He was also part of the Crusheen team defeated by Na Piarsaigh in the 2011 Munster club final.

O'Doherty first appeared on the inter-county scene with Clare during a two-year tenure with the minor team in 2005 and 2006. He later spent three consecutive seasons with the under-21 team and captained the team to their very first All-Ireland U21HC title in 2009. O'Doherty was later part of the Clare senior hurling team during their National Hurling League-winning campaign in 2016.

== Honours ==
St. Flannan's College

- Croke Cup: 2005
- Harty Cup: 2005

Crusheen

- Clare Senior Hurling Championship: 2010, 2011

Clare

- National Hurling League: 2016
- All-Ireland Under-21 Hurling Championship: 2009 (c)
- Munster Under-21 Hurling Championship: 2009 (c)

Sporting positions
Preceded by Conor Cooney	Clare under-21 hurling team captain 2009	Succeeded by John Conlon
Achievements
Preceded by James Dowling	All-Ireland Under-21 Hurling Final winning captain 2009	Succeeded by Pádraic Maher
