= Enda McGinley =

Irish Gaelic footballer and manager

Personal information
- Born: 1981 (age 44–45) County Tyrone
- Occupation: Physiotherapist
- Height: 1.85 m (6 ft 1 in)

Sport
- Sport: Gaelic football
- Position: Midfield
Club
- Years: Club
- Errigal Ciarán
Club titles
- Tyrone titles: 4
- Ulster titles: 1
Inter-county
- Years: County
- 2002–2012: Tyrone
Inter-county titles
- Ulster titles: 4
- All-Irelands: 3
- NFL: 2
- All Stars: 1

Enda McGinley (born 1981) is an Irish Gaelic football manager and former player for the Errigal Ciarán club and the Tyrone county team. He managed the Antrim county team between 2020 and 2022.

McGinley was part of Tyrone's All-Ireland-winning teams of 2003, 2005 and 2008. He is known for his hard working style of play and for scoring from midfield. He announced his retirement from inter-county football in November 2011.

== Playing career ==
McGinley plays his club football for Errigal Ciarán. He was a member of the Tyrone minor team who won the All-Ireland Minor Football Championship under Mickey Harte in 1998. With Harte again in charge he won two All-Ireland Under-21 Football Championship titles in 2000 and 2001. He was there when Harte guided Tyrone to the National League title in 2003 and then their first All Ireland later that year. He picked up his second All Ireland in 2005.

McGinley has suffered a number of injuries during his career. In 2003 he suffered a broken neck in the twelfth minute of the All-Ireland final during a clash with Armagh player Tony McEntee, but unaware of the seriousness of his injury he played on before spending weeks afterwards in a neck brace. In 2004 he fractured his skull in a training ground accident, while in 2005 he almost missed the All-Ireland final after picking up a leg injury in the semi-final against Armagh. Just two months after the final, he sustained a serious knee injury in a club game and required reconstruction on his cruciate ligament.

His playing came to the fore in 2008, when Tyrone unexpectedly made it to the All-Ireland final, with commentators such as Adrian Logan attributing a lot of the credit to McGinley's form. He was described as being among the top three midfielders in the 2008 championship. Tyrone went on to win the championship for the third time in six years. He finished his inter-county season by representing Ireland in the 2008 International Rules Series.

== Management career ==
McGinley has become a manager, such as with the Derry GAA club Swatragh.

In 2020, he was appointed manager of the Antrim seniors, succeeding Lenny Harbinson. McGinley and his backroom team left the Antrim senior job at the end of May 2022.

== Honours ==
- Ulster Senior Football Championship (4) 2003 2007 2009 2010
- All-Ireland Senior Football Championship (3) 2003 2005 2008
- National Football League Division 1 (2) 2002 2003
- Dr McKenna Cup (3) 2004 2005 2007
- Ulster Under-21 Football Championship (2) 2000 2001
- All-Ireland Under-21 Football Championship (2) 2000 2001
- Ulster Minor Football Championship (1) 1998
- All-Ireland Minor Football Championship (1) 1998
- Tyrone Senior Football Championship (4) 2000 2002 2006 2012
- Ulster Senior Club Football Championship (1) 2002

Awards

- GAA GPA All Stars Awards (1) 2008
- Irish News Ulster All-Star (1) 2008
- GPA Gaelic Team of the Year (1) 2008

Sporting positions
Preceded by Lenny Harbinson	Antrim Senior Football Manager; 2020–2022	Succeeded by Andy McEntee
