= Kevin McGourty =

Antrim dual player of Gaelic games, of Gaelic football and hurling

Kevin 'Hank' McGourty is an Irish dual player of Gaelic games, i.e. Gaelic football and hurling, who plays for the St Gall's club, County Antrim and Ulster, and, previously, Queen's University Belfast and University College Dublin.

== Biography ==
McGourty was educated at De La Salle Boys School Belfast, Queen's University Belfast, University College Dublin, and Blackhall Place.

Following the successful completion of a Bachelor of Arts (Joint Honors) Modern History and Political Science at Queen's he became involved in electoral politics. Between 2004 and 2007 he became the first student to be elected to political office at Queen's University Belfast Students Union on three occasions. During this period he served as Vice Chairperson of the Council of University Sport Ireland (CUSAI), now known as Student Sport Ireland. He also served on the National Executive Committee of the British University Sports Association (BUSA), and on the Board of the European University Sports Association (EUSA). During this period he was appointed onto the Russell Group of Universities SU committee, and served as Chairman of the Universities Academic Board. He also served on the 2007 Westminster Higher Education Committee review of Higher Education, representing Northern Ireland.

In 2007 he was a member of the Sigerson Cup winning squad at QUB, being named Player of the Tournament. He was awarded full colours by the university for his achievements beating the Poly in the final that year, containing several Lamh Dearg players.

In 2010 he was part of the St Gall's team that won the club's (and Antrim's) first All-Ireland Club Football title, completing a run of 10 out of 11 Antrim County Championship titles in the process.

In 2011 he was joint captain of University College Dublin's Sigerson Cup team in that competition's centenary year, whilst reading for a Postgraduate in Political Science. The university awarded him an Elite Athlete Bursary, alongside Noel McGrath (Tipperary hurler) and future Irish Olympians, Claire Lambe (rowing) and Arthur Lanigan-O'Keeffe (pentathlon). The university awarded him full colours for his sporting achievements.

In 2018 the Law Society of Ireland awarded him a MOOC Certificate in Sports Law.

At primary and secondary schools he was an accomplished soccer player and, between 1993 and 2000, played on De La Salle College's schoolboy team, during which time he won four Northern Ireland Cup medals. He subsequently represented both Donegal Celtic and Carrick Rangers in the Irish Football League.

He is a former columnist on sporting matters with the Gaelic Life and County Antrim Post newspapers.

He is an Irish republican, with previous ties to the Fianna Fáil party, and is an infrequent blogger on the Wordpress site on sport, politics and legal matters.

In 2026, he plead guilty to posing as a solicitor.
