= Lenny Harbinson =

Antrim Gaelic footballer and manager

Sport
Club management
- Years: Club
- St Gall's
- 1
Inter-county management
- Years: Team
- 2017–2020: Antrim

Lenny Harbinson is a Gaelic football manager and former player. He managed his native Antrim between 2017 and 2020.

He played for St Gall's and Antrim and led a sales team.

Appointed Antrim senior manager in late 2017, he was unable to gain promotion from Division 4 of the National Football League and the county exited the Ulster Senior Football Championship in its first game in each of his three years, though defeated Louth in an away All-Ireland Senior Football Championship qualifier in 2019. Harbinson previously led St Gall's to the 2009–10 All-Ireland Senior Club Football Championship.

Sporting positions
Preceded by	Antrim Senior Football Manager; 2017–2020	Succeeded by Enda McGinley
Achievements
Preceded by Paddy Carr (Kilmacud Crokes)	All-Ireland Club SFC winning manager 2010	Succeeded by Tony McEntee (Crossmaglen Rangers)
