= Catherine McGourty =

Caitriona (Catherine) McGourty
Personal information
- Native name: Cáitriona Níc Dhobhartaigh (Irish)

Sport
- Sport: Camogie
- Position: Centre half forward
Club*
| Years | Club | Apps (scores) |
| 1997-present | Ballycran | ? |
Inter-county**
| Years | County | Apps (scores) |
| | Down | ? |
- * club appearances and scores correct as of (16:31, 30 June 2010 (UTC)). **Inter County team apps and scores correct as of (16:31, 30 June 2010 (UTC)).

Catherine McGourty is an Irish player of Camogie, and a four-time award winner of Soaring Stars awards the first of which happened in 2009, then followed by further awards in 2011, 2012 and 2014. Caitriona would have been involved as a member with the Down team that won the 2001 Junior camogie Championship. She represented Ireland in a shinty-camogie meetup combination in 2008. She captained the Down team in 2009 and plays for Ballycran.
