= Paul Cahillane =

Irish Gaelic footballer

Personal information
- Native name: Pól Ó Cathaláin (Irish)
- Born: 4 March 1989 (age 37) Portlaoise, Ireland
- Occupation: Education
- Height: 1.78 m (5 ft 10 in)

Sport
- Sport: Gaelic Football
- Position: Right corner forward
Club
- Years: Club
- 2009 – present: Portlaoise
Club titles
- Laois titles: 10
- Leinster titles: 1
Inter-county
- Years: County
- 8: Laois

Paul Cahillane (born 4 March 1989) is a Gaelic footballer from County Laois.

Full Name: Paul Cahillane

Irish Name: Pól Ó Cathaláin

Date of Birth: 4 March 1989

Place of Birth: County Mayo, Ireland (raised in Portlaoise, County Laois)

Height: 1.78 m (5 ft 10 in)

Positions: Left Winger / Midfielder (Association Football); Right Corner Forward (Gaelic Football)

Association Football Career

Youth & Celtic F.C. (2002–2008)

Cahillane began his development as a prominent youth left winger with the elite Dublin schoolboys academy Belvedere F.C., where he played for three years. His performances earned him a move to Scottish giants Celtic F.C. in September 2005 under a youth apprenticeship scheme.

During his three years in Glasgow, Cahillane enjoyed significant success with Celtic's academy and reserve structures. He was an integral part of the squads that won the SPL Youth League and the Scottish Youth Cup in 2006, followed by the SPL Reserve League title in 2007. Despite regular training stints with the senior first team, tactical shifts deploying him on his weaker right wing hindered his breakthrough. He was released by manager Gordon Strachan in the summer of 2008 at age 19 without making a competitive senior first-team appearance.

Return to Ireland & League of Ireland (2008–2015)

Upon returning to Ireland, Cahillane signed for University College Dublin A.F.C.. He made his League of Ireland Premier Division debut as a substitute against Bohemians on 31 October 2008 and made one subsequent top-flight appearance before briefly pausing his senior soccer career to focus on his education and Gaelic football.

He made a brief return to national league soccer in July 2015, signing for Wexford FC (then Wexford Youths) under Shane Keegan. He made an immediate impact, scoring on his debut on 13 July 2015. He made several appearances during the latter half of the season, helping the club secure the 2015 League of Ireland First Division title and promotion to the Premier Division. He subsequently continued playing amateur soccer locally for Portlaoise AFC.

International Career

Cahillane was a highly capped youth international for the Republic of Ireland. He represented his country across multiple underage tiers, notably earning caps and featuring prominently for both the Republic of Ireland U-17 and U-19 national teams during his years at Belvedere and Celtic.

Gaelic Football Career

Club: Portlaoise GAA (2009–Present)

Following his return from Scotland, Cahillane transitioned into one of the most decorated club Gaelic footballers in Laois GAA history with his home club, Portlaoise. Operating primarily as a clinical right corner forward, he won 10 Laois Senior Football Championship medals (spanning 2009–2015 and 2017–2019).

In his debut season in 2009, he helped Portlaoise capture the Leinster Senior Club Football Championship title and was named the Leinster Senior Club Footballer of the Year. His individual performances continued to anchor the club's dominance, earning him the Laois Senior Footballer of the Year award in 2014. He additionally won five All-County Football League (ACL) Division 1 titles with the club (2009, 2011, 2012, 2014, 2019).

Inter-County: Laois GAA

Cahillane's club form translated to a lengthy inter-county career, where he represented the Laois Senior Football team for 8 seasons. During his inter-county tenure, he helped Laois achieve back-to-back league promotions, securing elevation from Allianz Football League (AFL) Division 4 in 2018 followed by promotion from Division 3 in 2019.

Post-Playing Career & Personal Life

After retiring from elite senior sports, Cahillane focused heavily on his profession in education. He works as a teacher of Geography, LCVP, and ICT, and serves as the Programme Co-ordinator at St. Mary's CBS Portlaoise. He has also stayed active in sports development as an advisor for the National Council for Curriculum and Assessment (NCCA) and works heavily in local youth GAA coaching setups.

== Sport ==
=== Youth soccer ===
An under-17 and under-19 Republic of Ireland soccer international player, Cahillane played with Celtic F.C. from 2005 until 2008. He won the SPL Youth League and Youth cup in 2006 and won the SPL Reserve League a year later in 2007. This came after three years at the Dublin schoolboys team, Belvedere FC. He returned to Ireland in 2008 and played in the League of Ireland with the UCD Reserves.

=== Gaelic football ===
As a Gaelic footballer, Cahillane won ten Laois Senior Football Championship medals with Portlaoise from 2009 to 2015 and 2017 to 2019. He also won five ACL Division 1 titles in 2009, 2011, 2012, 2014 and 2019. He was also part of the Portlaoise team that won the Leinster Senior Club Championship in 2009.

Cahillane was named Leinster Senior Club Footballer of the Year in 2009 and Laois Senior Footballer of the year in 2014.

He also played 8 seasons with the Laois Senior Football team and achieved AFL Division 4 promotion in 2018 and AFL Division 3 promotion in 2019.
