= McCourty =

McCourty is a surname. Notable people with the surname include:

- Devin McCourty (born 1987), American football player
- Jason McCourty (born 1987), American football player, twin brother of Devin
- William McCourty (1884–1917), English footballer

== See also ==
- McGourty
