= Diarmuid McMahon =

Irish hurler

Personal information
- Native name: Diarmad Mac Mathúna (Irish)
- Born: Ennis, County Clare

Sport
- Sport: Hurling
- Position: Centre-Back
Club
- Years: Club
- 2001-present: Kilmaley
Club titles
- Clare titles: 1
Inter-county
Years	County	Apps (scores)
2002-2011	Clare	37 (7-41)
Inter-county titles
- Munster titles: 0
- All-Irelands: 0
- NHL: 0
- All Stars: 0

Diarmuid McMahon (born 1981) is an Irish sportsperson. He plays hurling with his local club Kilmaley and has been a member of the Clare senior hurling team since 2004.
