= Jim Berry (hurler) =

Irish Gaelic sportsperson

Personal information
- Native name: Séamus Ó Béara (Irish)

Sport
- Sport: Hurling
Club
- Years: Club
- Faythe Harriers
Inter-county*
Years	County	Apps (scores)
2009 – present	Wexford	3 (0-03)
Inter-county titles
- All-Irelands: 0
- NHL: 1 (Div 2)
- All Stars: 0
- *Inter County team apps and scores correct as of birth_place=Wexford, Ireland.

Jim Berry (born 1984) is an Irish sportsperson. He plays hurling with his local club Faythe Harriers and also plays hurling for the Wexford senior and U21 team. Married Margaret O Reilly, 17 August 2005 in Church Of The Most Holy Rosary Tullow, County Carlow

== Playing career ==
Berry made his debut during the National Hurling league against Clare following his good showing last time out against Down.
