= St Gall's GAC =

Antrim-based Gaelic games club

St Gall's
- Naomh Gall
- Founded: 1910
- County: Antrim
- Nickname: The Galls
- Colours: Blue, White, Yellow
- Grounds: De la Salle Park, Milltown, Belfast
- Coordinates: 54.5854°N 5.9719°W

Playing kits
Home Kit	Change Kit

Senior Club Championships
	All Ireland	Ulster champions	Antrim champions
Football:	1	3	19

St Gall's Gaelic Athletic Club is a sports club based in Belfast, County Antrim, Northern Ireland. It competes in the Antrim leagues and championships of the Gaelic Athletic Association, in Gaelic football and ladies' Gaelic football.

== Football ==
In 2010, they won the All-Ireland Senior Club Football Championship, their first title by defeating Kilmurry Ibrickane of Clare in the final at Croke Park. Lenny Harbinson, who went on to manage Antrim, was manager of St Gall's at the time.

== Notable players ==
=== Senior inter-county players ===
==== Men's Gaelic football ====
Antrim

- CJ McGourty
- Kevin McGourty

Cavan

- Rory Gallagher

Fermanagh

- Rory Gallagher

==== Hurling ====
Antrim

- CJ McGourty

==== Ladies' Gaelic football ====
Antrim

- Michelle Drayne

=== Others ===
Northern Ireland netball internationals

- Michelle Drayne

== Football Titles ==
- Antrim Senior Football Championship (19)
  - 1933, 1982, 1983, 1987, 1990, 1993, 2001, 2002, 2003, 2004, 2005, 2007, 2008, 2009, 2010, 2011, 2012, 2013, 2014
- Ulster Senior Club Football Championship (3)
  - 1982, 2005, 2009
- All-Ireland Senior Club Football Championship (1)
  - 2010

== Hurling Titles ==
- Antrim Intermediate Hurling Championship (3)
  - 1997, 2009, 2019
- Ulster Intermediate Club Hurling Championship (2)
  - 2009, 2019
- All-Ireland Intermediate Club Hurling Championship
  - Runners-up 2010

== Ladies' Football Titles ==
- Antrim Senior Ladies Football Championship (1)
  - 2011
- Ulster Intermediate Ladies Football Championship (1)
  - 2010
- Antrim Intermediate Ladies Football Championship (1)
  - 2010
