= Colin Ryan (Clare hurler) =

Irish hurler

Personal information
- Nickname: Colly
- Born: 2 September 1988 (age 38) Newmarket-on-Fergus, County Clare, Ireland
- Occupation: Secondary school teacher in salesians college limerick
- Height: 5 ft 11 in (180 cm)

Sport
- Sport: Hurling
- Position: Left wing-forward
Club
- Years: Club
- 2005-present: Newmarket-on-Fergus
Club titles
- Clare titles: 1
Inter-county*
Years	County	Apps (scores)
2007-2017	Clare	25 (0-126)
Inter-county titles
- Munster titles: 0
- All-Irelands: 1
- NHL: 1
- All Stars: 0
- *Inter County team apps and scores correct as of 14:33, 7 October 2017.

Colin Ryan (born 2 September 1988) is an Irish hurler. His league and championship career with the Clare senior team lasted ten years from 2007 to 2017.

Born in Newmarket-on-Fergus, County Clare, Ryan first played competitive hurling during his schooling at St. Flannan's College. Here he won an All-Ireland medal in 2005, as well as back-to-back Harty Cup medals. Ryan simultaneously began his club career at juvenile and underage levels with Newmarket-on-Fergus. After earlier winning several county under-21 championship medals, he won a county senior championship medal in 2012.

Ryan made his debut on the inter-county scene at the age of sixteen when he joined the Clare minor team. After little success in this grade, he later won an All-Ireland medal with the under-21 team in 2009. By this stage Ryan had joined the Clare senior team, making his debut during the 2007 championship. Over the course of the next ten years, Ryan won one All-Ireland medal and one National Hurling League medal. Having earlier announced that he was taking an extended break from inter-county hurling, Ryan announced his retirement from the game on 6 October 2017.

As a member of the Munster inter-provincial team, Ryan won one Railway Cup medal.

Ryan attended NUI Galway. He played for the university hurling team in the Fitzgibbon Cup, and was part of the side that lost the 2007 final.

== Career statistics ==
Team	Year	National League			Munster		All-Ireland		Total	
Team	Year	Division	Apps	Score	Apps	Score	Apps	Score	Apps	Score
Clare	2007	Division 1A	0	0-00	1	0-00	0	0-00	1	0-00
Clare	2008	Division 1B	0	0-00	0	0-00	0	0-00	0	0-00
Clare	2009	Division 1	6	1-24	1	0-12	1	0-00	8	1-36
Clare	2010	Division 2	8	5-36	1	0-01	1	0-03	10	5-40
Clare	2011	Division 2	7	3-23	1	0-00	0	0-00	8	3-23
Clare	2012	Division 1B	7	1-22	1	0-03	2	0-00	10	1-25
Clare	2013	Division 1A	6	0-58	2	0-09	6	0-61	14	0-128
Clare	2014	Division 1A	7	1-43	1	0-06	2	0-17	10	1-66
Clare	2015	Division 1A	5	0-29	1	0-07	2	0-05	8	0-41
Clare	2016	Division 1B	7	0-27	1	0-02	1	0-00	9	0-29
Total			53	11-262	10	0-40	15	0-86	78	11-388

== Honours ==
=== Team ===
St. Flannan's College

- All-Ireland Colleges' Senior Hurling Championship (1): 2005
- Munster Colleges' Senior Hurling Championship (2): 2004, 2005

Newmarket-on-Fergus

- Clare Senior Hurling Championship (1): 2012

Clare

- All-Ireland Senior Hurling Championship (1): 2013
- National Hurling League (Division 1B) (1): 2012
- National Hurling League (Division 1A) (1): 2016
- All-Ireland Under-21 Hurling Championship (1): 2009
- Munster Under-21 Hurling Championship (1): 2009

Munster

- Railway Cup (1): 2013
