= CJ McGourty =

Antrim hurler and Gaelic footballer

Personal information
- Born: Belfast, County Antrim
- Occupation: Teacher
- Height: 5 ft 8 in (173 cm)

Sport
- Football Position: Forward
- Hurling Position: Forward
Clubs
- Years: Club
- Ardboe; St Galls Ardboe O’Donovan Rossas
Club titles
	Football	Hurling
Antrim titles	6	1
Ulster titles	2	1
All-Ireland titles	1	0
Inter-county
- Years: County
- Antrim (H); Antrim (F)
Inter-county titles
	Football	Hurling
Ulster Titles	1	2
All-Ireland Titles	1	0
All-Stars	1	3

CJ McGourty is a dual player from Belfast, Northern Ireland. He has represented Antrim at all levels in both Gaelic football and hurling, and plays his club football and hurling with St Gall's.

In football, he won a Tommy Murphy Cup in 2008. In hurling, he was won Ulster Championships at Minor and Under 21 level. He later lined out with Tyrone helping them to the 2021 Nicky Rackard Cup final.

He has had much success with his club St Gall's, winning Antrim Senior Football Championship medals in 2005, 2007, 2008, 2009,2010,2011 Ulster Senior Club Football Championship medals in 2005 and 2009 and an All-Ireland Senior Club Football Championship medal in 2010. He also played in the All-Ireland Senior Club Football Championship final in 2006.

In hurling he has also had much success, winning an Antrim Intermediate Hurling Championship and Ulster Intermediate Hurling Championship in 2009 and playing in the All-Ireland Intermediate Club Hurling Championship final in 2010.

== Honours ==
Football

- 6 Antrim Senior Football Championships (2005, 2007, 2008, 2009, 2010, 2011)
- 3 Ulster Colleges Hurling All-Stars (2003, 2004, 2005)
- 2 Ulster Senior Club Football Championships (2005, 2009)
- 1 All-Ireland Senior Club Football Championship (2010)
- 1 Tommy Murphy Cup (2008)
- 1 McLarnon Cup (2006)
- 1 Ulster Colleges Football All-Star (2006)

Hurling

- 1 Ulster Minor Hurling Championship (2006)
- 1 Ulster Under-21 Hurling Championship (2009)
- 1 Ulster Intermediate Club Hurling Championship (2009)
- 1 Antrim Intermediate Hurling Championship (2009)
- 1 Nicky Rackard Cup (2022 Nicky Rackard Cup|2022)
