= 2023 National Football League (Ireland) =

Gaelic football competition

National Football League
League details
- Dates: 28 January – 2 April 2023
- Teams: 32

League champions
- Winners: Mayo (13th win)
- Captain: Paddy Durcan
- Manager: Kevin McStay

League runners-up
- Runners-up: Galway
- Captain: Seán Kelly
- Manager: Pádraic Joyce

Other division winners
- Division 2: Dublin
- Division 3: Cavan
- Division 4: Sligo

The 2023 National Football League, known for sponsorship reasons as the Allianz National Football League, was the 92nd staging of the National Football League (NFL), an annual Gaelic football tournament for county teams. Thirty-one county teams from the island of Ireland, plus London, competed; Kilkenny do not participate.

For the first time ever, there was no Leinster team in the top tier of the league after Dublin and Kildare were both relegated on the last day of the 2022 season.

For the 2023 season, league position was also important for the All-Ireland Championship; 7 of the teams that qualified for the All-Ireland round robin stage were selected based on league finish. (Note: All 8 provincial finalists, plus Westmeath (winners of the 2022 Tailteann Cup) qualify. 7 more teams are then chosen based on league finish. If Westmeath reach the Leinster final, an 8th team will be chosen based on league finish. Placings are determined after promotion and relegation is applied and after finals are played, so the ranking is: (League Champions)–(League Finalists)–(3rd Div 1)–(4th Div 1)–(5th Div 1)–(6th Div 1)–(Div 2 champions)–(Div 2 finalists)–(7th Div 1)–(8th Div 1)–(3rd Div 2) etc.)

Mayo were the winners, defeating Galway in the final.

== Format ==
=== League structure ===
Teams by Province and Division
Province	Division 1	Division 2	Division 3	Division 4	Total
Connacht	3	0	0	2	5
Leinster	0	4	3	4	11
Munster	1	3	1	1	6
Ulster	4	1	4	0	9
Britain	0	0	0	1	1
Total	8	8	8	8	32

In the top division, Division 1, teams compete to become the National Football League (NFL) champions. The top two teams qualify for the NFL Final, with the winners crowned NFL champions.

The 2023 National Football League consists of four divisions of eight teams. Each team plays every other team in its division once. Two points are awarded for a win, one point is awarded for a draw and none are awarded for a loss.

Teams compete for promotion and relegation to a higher or lower league. In Divisions 2, 3 and 4, the first and second-places teams are promoted, while the bottom two teams of divisions 1, 2 and 3 are relegated .

=== Tiebreakers for league ranking ===
As per the Official GAA Guide - Part 1 - Section 6.21 -

If two teams in the same group are equal on points on completion of the league phase, the following tie-breaking criteria are applied:

1. Where two teams only are involved - the outcome of the meeting of the two teams in the previous game in the Competition;

If three or more teams in the same group are equal on points on completion of the league phase, the following tie-breaking criteria are applied:

1. Scoring Difference (subtracting the total scores against from total scores for);
2. Highest Total Score For;
3. A Play-Off.

In the event that two teams or more finish with equal points, but have been affected by a disqualification, loss of game on a proven objection, retirement or walkover, the tie shall be decided by the following means:

1. Score Difference from the games in which only the teams involved, (teams tied on points), have played each other. (subtracting the total Scores Against from total Scores For)
2. Highest Total Score For, in which only the teams involved, have played each other, and have finished equal in (i)
3. A Play-Off

== Division 1 ==
Locations of the 2023 NFL Division 1 teams

=== Table ===
Pos	Team	Pld	W	D	L	PF	PA	PD	Pts	Qualification
1	Mayo	7	4	2	1	126	102	+24	10	Advance to National League Final
2	Galway	7	4	2	1	93	91	+2	10	Advance to National League Final
3	Roscommon	7	4	0	3	105	92	+13	8	
4	Tyrone	7	4	0	3	113	110	+3	8	
5	Kerry	7	3	0	4	106	104	+2	6	
6	Monaghan	7	3	0	4	109	119	−10	6	
7	Armagh	7	2	1	4	95	98	−3	5	Relegation to 2024 NFL Division 2
8	Donegal	7	1	1	5	76	117	−41	3	Relegation to 2024 NFL Division 2

Source: GAA
Rules for classification: Tiebreakers

=== Matches ===
==== Round 1 ====
28 January 2023 Round 1	Monaghan	1-12 (15) – (17) 1-14	Armagh	Castleblayney
				Venue: St Mary's Park
	Gls: C McCarthy 1 (pen). Pts: M Bannigan 0-4 (1f), C McCarthy 2 (2fs), S O’Hanlon 2, D Ward 1, S Jones 1, S Carey 1, R Beggan 1 (f).	Report	Gls: T Kelly 1. Pts: R O’Neill 5 (2ms, 1f), S Campbell 2, S Sheridan 1 (m), A Nugent 2, E Rafferty 1, A Murnin 1, R McQuillan 1, R Grugan 1 (f).	Referee: Sean Hurson (Tyrone)

28 January 2023 Round 1	Mayo	1-11 (14) – (14) 2-08	Galway	Castlebar
				Venue: MacHale Park
	Gls: J Carr 1. Pts: R O’Donoghue 6 (4fs), M Ruane 1, D O’Connor 1, C O’Connor 1, B Tuohy 1, Flynn 1.	Report	Gls: M Tierney 1, S Kelly 1 Pts: D Comer 3 (1f, 1m), P Kelly 1, P Conroy 1, C McDaid 1, R Finnerty 1, P Cooke 1 (f).	Referee: Joe McQuillan (Cavan); Attendance: 13,654

29 January 2023 Round 1	Roscommon	3-11 (20) – (15) 1-12	Tyrone	Roscommon
				Venue: Dr Hyde Park
	Gls: B O'Carroll 1, C Murtagh 1, D Murtagh 1. Pts: N Daly 3, C Cox 2 (2f), B O’Carroll 2, C Murtagh 1, D Murtagh 1, D Cregg 1, B Stack 1.	Report	Gls: K McGeary 1. Pts: D McCurry 3 (1f), D Canavan 2 (1f), P Harte 1 (1f), K McGeary 1, N Devlin 1, D Mulgrew 1, N Morgan 1 (1f), R Donnelly 1, N Sludden 1.	Referee: David Coldrick (Meath)

29 January 2023 Round 1	Donegal	0-13 (13) – (12) 1-09	Kerry	Ballybofey
				Venue: MacCumhaill Park
	Pts: C McColgan 3, C O'Donnell 3, D Ó Baoill 2, J McGroddy `1, J Brennan 1, L McGlynn 1, P McBrearty 1.	Report	Gls: D Moynihan 1. Pts: D Roche 3, P Murphy 2, T O'Sullivan 1, K Spillane 1, R Buckley 1, D O'Sullivan 1.	Referee: Liam Devenney (Mayo)

==== Round 2 ====
5 February 2023 Round 2	Kerry	3-16 (25) – (14) 0-14	Monaghan	Killarney
13:30 IST (UTC)				Venue: Fitzgerald Stadium
	Gls: D O’Sullivan 1, D Roche 1, P Clifford 1. Pts: T Brosnan 4 (4f), D O’Sullivan 3, D Roche 2, T O’Sullivan 2, P Clifford 1, M Burns 1, D Moynihan 1, A Spillane 1, K Spillane 1 (m).	Report	Pts: C McCarthy 5 (4f), M Bannigan 3 (2f), S O’Hanlon 3, K Duffy 1, D Ward 1, K Gallagher 1.	Referee: Conor Lane (Cork); Attendance: 10,232

5 February 2023 Round 2	Galway	0-08 (8) – (9) 0-09	Roscommon	Galway
14:00 IST (UTC)				Venue: Pearse Stadium
	Pts: D Conneely 3 (3fs), C McDaid 1, M Tierney 1, D McHugh 1, I Burke 1, J Heaney 1.	Report	Pts: D Murtagh 3 (1f), B O’Carroll 2, C Lennon 1, R Hughes 1, D Cregg 1.	Referee: Martin McNally (Monaghan)

5 February 2023 Round 2	Tyrone	0-16 (16) – (8) 0-08	Donegal	Omagh
14:00 IST (UTC)				Venue: O'Neill's Healy Park
	Pts: D McCurry 7 (6f 1m), D Canavan 3, C Munroe 1, F Burns 1, C Quinn 1, P Hampsey 1, B Kennedy 1, C McShane 1 (m).	Report	Pts: J Brennan 2 (1m), C O’Donnell 2, J McKelvey 1, H McFadden 1, P McBrearty 1 (m), J Bradley-Walsh 1 (f).	Referee: David Gough (Meath)

5 February 2023 Round 2	Armagh	0-17 (17) – (17) 0-17	Mayo	Armagh
15:30 IST (UTC)				Venue: Athletic Grounds
	Pts: R O'Neill 6 (5fs, 1 45), R Grugan 4 (3fs), A Murnin 3, C Turbitt 3 (1f), T Kelly 1.	Report	Pts: R O'Donoghue 7 (6fs), J Flynn 2, C O'Connor 2, A O'Shea 2 (1m), F McDonagh 1, M Ruane 1, J Carr 1, C Reape 1 (f).	Referee: Fergal Kelly (Longford); Attendance: 14,113

==== Round 3 ====
18 February 2023 Round 3	Mayo	2-14 (20) – (13) 1-10	Kerry	Castlebar
15:30 IST (UTC)				Venue: Hastings MacHale Park
	Gls: R O'Donoghue 1, J Carr 1. Pts: J Flynn 4, R O’Donoghue 3 (2fs, 1m), J Carr 2 (1m), C Reape 2 (2 45s), D O’Connor 1, D McHugh 1, J Carney 1.	Report	Gls: B O’Sullivan 1 Pts: D Clifford 3, S O’Shea 2 (1f), D Moynihan 1, P Murphy 1, T Brosnan 1, D Roche 1, D O’Sullivan 1.	Referee: Sean Hurson (Tyrone); Attendance: 15,756

19 February 2023 Round 3	Roscommon	1-12 (15) – (12) 0-12	Armagh	Roscommon
				Venue: Dr Hyde Park
	Gls: E Smith 1 (pen). Pts: D Murtagh 3 (2f), C Daly 2, B O’Carroll 2, C Lennon 1, E Smith 1, R Dolan 1, C Murtagh 1 (f), D Cregg 1.	Report	Pts: J Duffy 4, R O’Neill 4 (1 ’45, 1f), R Grugan 2 (2f), B McCambridge 1, A Murnin 1	Referee: Conor Lane (Cork)

19 February 2023 Round 3	Monaghan	1-20 (23) – (15) 0-15	Donegal	Clones
				Venue: St Tiernach's Park
	Gls: S Jones 1. Pts: J McCarron 7 (4fs, 1m), S O’Hanlon 3, R Beggan 2 (2fs), S Jones 2, C McManus 2 (2ms), C McCarthy 1, K Duffy 1, M Bannigan 1, S Carey 1.	Report	Pts: O Gallen 5 (4fs), M Langan 4, C O’Donnell 3, C McGonagle 1, D Ó Baoill 1, J Brennan 1.	Referee: Noel Mooney (Cavan)

19 February 2023 Round 3	Galway	0-16 (16) – (13) 0-13	Tyrone	Tuam
				Venue: Tuam Stadium
	Pts: M Tierney 6 (3f); P Conroy 3 (2f), C Sweeney 3, P Cooke 1, J Glynn 1, I Burke 1, S Kelly 1.	Report	Pts: D McCurry 5 (3f); C McShane 2 (1m); D Canavan 1 (f), C Quinn 1, C Munroe 1, R Donnelly 1, P Harte 1, P Hampsey 1.	Referee: Brendan Cawley (Kildare)

==== Round 4 ====
25 February 2023 Round 4	Kerry	0-12 (12) – (11) 0-11	Armagh	Tralee
17:00 IST (UTC+1)				Venue: Austin Stack Park
	Pts: D Clifford 4 (4f), T Morley 1, P Murphy 1, B O’Sullivan 1, S O’Shea 1 (f), P Clifford 1 (f), D Roche 1, T Brosnan 1, D O’Sullivan 1.	Report	Pts: R O’Neill 4 (3f), J Óg Burns 2, E Rafferty 1 (f), A Forker 1, G McCabe 1, S Campbell 1, C Turbitt 1	Referee: James Molloy (Galway); Attendance: 11,603

25 February 2023 Round 4	Mayo	4-10 (22) – (12) 0-12	Tyrone	Castlebar
19:00 IST (UTC+1)				Venue: Hastings MacHale Park
	Gls: E Hession 1, D O’Connor 1, A O’Shea 1, J Carr 1. Pts: R O’Donoghue 3 (3fs), J Carney 1, C Reape 1 (f); C Loftus 1, J Doherty 1, M Ruane 1, F McDonagh 1, C O’Connor 1.	Report	Pts: D McCurry 4 (3fs), D Canavan 3 (1f), N Morgan 3 (2fs, ‘45).	Referee: Noel Mooney (Cavan); Attendance: 12,218

26 February 2023 Round 4	Donegal	1-09 (12) – (12) 1-09	Galway	Letterkenny
12:30 IST (UTC+1)				Venue: O'Donnell Park
	Gls: O Gallen 1 (pen). Pts: O Gallen 2; C O'Donnell 2, S Patton 1 (f), J Brennan 1, C McGonagle 1, M Langan 1, J McGee 1.	Report	Gls: M Tierney 1. Pts: M Tierney 3 (1 '45), P Conroy 2 (2f), R Finnerty 2, C Sweeney 1, P Cooke 1.	Referee: David Coldrick (Meath)

26 February 2023 Round 4	Monaghan	0-14 (14) – (11) 0-11	Roscommon	Clones
14:30 IST (UTC+1)				Venue: St Tiernach's Park
	Pts: J McCarron 4 (2f), M Bannigan 3 (1f); K Gallagher 1, R Beggan 1 (f), S Jones 1, G Mohan 1, D Ward 1, R Wylie 1, C McCarthy 1.	Report	Pts: D Murtagh 2 (1f); R Hughes 2, C Murtagh 2 (1f); B O’Carroll 2, N Kilroy 1, E Smith 1, B Stack 1.	Referee: Niall Cullen (Fermanagh)

==== Round 5 ====
4 March 2023 Round 5	Armagh	0-13 (13) – (10) 0-10	Donegal	Armagh
19:30 IST (UTC+1)				Venue: Box-It Athletic Grounds
	Pts: R O'Neill 5 (4fs, 145), A Murnin 3 (1m), A Forker 1, J Óg Burns 1, S Campbell 1, E Rafferty 1 (f), R Grugan 1 (f).	Report	Pts: O Gallen 2 (1f), H McFadden 2 (1m), S Patton 2 (2fs), C O'Donnell 1, C Thompson 1, J McGee 1, J Brennan 1.	Referee: Jerome Henry (Mayo); Attendance: 12,582

5 March 2023 Round 5	Tyrone	1-15 (18) – (15) 2-09	Kerry	Omagh
				Venue: O'Neill's Healy Park
	Gls: B Kennedy 1 Pts: M Donnelly 3, D McCurry 3 (3f) D Canavan 2, R Canavan 2 (2f), C Quinn 1, P Harte 1, J Oguz 1, C Kilpatrick 1, D Mulgrew 1.	Report	Gls: P Murphy 1, S O'Shea 1. Pts: D Clifford 3 (2f), S O’Shea 2 (1f), T Brosnan 2 (1m), D O’Sullivan 1, T O’Sullivan 1.	Referee: Martin McNally (Monaghan)

5 March 2023 Round 5	Galway	1-13 (16) – (10) 0-10	Monaghan	Salthill
				Venue: Pearse Stadium
	Gls: J Heaney 1. Pts: P Conroy 3 (2f), M Tierney 3 (2f), R Finnerty 3, P Cooke 1, J Daly 1, J Heaney 1, S Kelly 1.	Report	Pts: R Beggan 4 (4fs), S Jones 2, C McCarthy 1 (f), M Bannigan 1, D Ward 1, K Lavelle 1.	Referee: Conor Lane (Cork); Attendance: 5,275

5 March 2023 Round 5	Roscommon	2-11 (17) – (19) 1-16	Mayo	Roscommon
				Venue: Dr. Hyde Park
	Gls: E Smith 1, C Cox 1. Pts: D Murtagh 4 (3f), C Murtagh 2 (1f), C Daly 1, D Cregg 1, E Smith 1, C Cox 1 (f), T O’Rourke 1.	Report	Gls: J Carney 1. Pts: C O’Connor 7 (6f), J Carr 3, T Conroy 1, F McDonagh 1, R Byrne 1 (45), J Carney 1, B Tuohy 1, M Ruane 1.	Referee: Brendan Cawley (Kildare); Attendance: 12,491

==== Round 6 ====
18 March 2023 Round 6	Kerry	1-12 (15) – (12) 0-12	Roscommon	Tralee
				Venue: Austin Stack Park
	Gls: D Clifford 1. Pts: D Clifford 2 (1f), D O’Sullivan 2, T Brosnan 2, S O’Shea 2 (2fs), T O’Sullivan 1, D Moynihan 1, P Clifford 1, K Spillane 1.	Report	Pts: C Cox 6 (4fs, 1m ), D Murtagh 2, D Smith 2 (2fs), C Murtagh 1, D Cregg 1.	Referee: Derek O'Mahony (Tipperary)

18 March 2023 Round 6	Armagh	1-06 (9) – (11) 1-08	Galway	Armagh
				Venue: Box-It Athletic Grounds
	Gls: E Rafferty 1. Pts: C Mackin 1, S Campbell 1, C Cumiskey 1, R Grugan 1, R O’Neill 1, A Nugent 1.	Report	Gls: M Tierney 1, Pts: T Culhane 2 (2f), S Walsh 2 (1’45’, 1f), J Heaney 2, P Conroy 1, C Sweeney 1.	Referee: David Gough (Meath)

19 March 2023 Round 6	Donegal	0-9 (9) – (20) 1-17	Mayo	Ballybofey
15:45 IST (UTC+1)				Venue: MacCumhaill Park
	Pts: C Thompson 3 (2 fs), M Langan (2 fs) 3, E Ban Gallaghan 1, J Brennan 1, O Gallen 1.	Report	Gls: R O'Donoghue 1 Pts: R O'Donoghue 3 (1f), A O'Shea 4 (2fs), M Ruane 3, P Durcan 2, J Flynn 2, C Reape 1 (1 45), J Carney 1, P Towey 1.	Referee: Sean Hurson (Tyrone)

19 March 2023 Round 6	Monaghan	0-13 (13) – (21) 2-15	Tyrone	Clones
14:00 IST (UTC+1)				Venue: St Tiernach's Park
	Pts: C McManus 4 (4 fs), M Bannigan 4 (4 fs) K Gallagher 1 (1 m), R Beggan 1 (1 45), D Ward 1 (1 m), K Duffy 1, S Carey 1 (1 m).	Report	Gls: P Harte 1 (1 pen), C Quinn 1. Pts: P Harte 1, D McCurry 4 (2 fs), D Canavan 3, C Kilpatrick 2 (1m), N Morgan 1 (1 45), R Donnelly 1, N Devlin 1, M Donnelly 1, F Burns 1.	Referee: Joe McQuillan (Cavan)

==== Round 7 ====
26 March 2023 Round 7	Galway	1-13 (16) – (14) 0-14	Kerry	Salthill
13:45 IST (UTC+1)				Venue: Pearse Stadium
	Gls: P Conroy 1. Pts: S Walsh 5 (5fs), J Maher 2, T Culhane 1, C Sweeney 1, J Daly 1, D Comer 1, M Tierney 1, R Finnerty 1	Report	Pts: S O’Shea 5 (2fs, 2 45), D Clifford 2 (2fs), BD O’Sullivan 2, T O’Sullivan 2, P Clifford 2, G White 1.	Referee: Niall Cullen (Fermanagh)

26 March 2023 Round 7	Mayo	0-14 (14) – (20) 2-14	Monaghan	Castlebar
13:45 IST (UTC+1)				Venue: Hastings MacHale Park
	Pts: P Towey 6 (6fs), J Flynn 2, B Tuohy 2, S Coen 1, M Ruane 1, D McHale 1, R O’Donoghue 1 (f).	Report	Gls: C McManus 1 (pen), R O'Toole 1. Pts: C McManus 7 (2m), J McCarron 3 (1m, 1f), S O’Hanlon 2, R O’Toole 1, C McCarthy 1.	Referee: David Gough {Meath)

26 March 2023 Round 7	Roscommon	0-21 (21) – (9) 0-09	Donegal	Roscommon
13:45 IST (UTC+1)				Venue: Dr Hyde Park
	Pts: D Murtagh 3 (1f), E Smith 3, B O’Carroll 3, C Murtagh 3, K Doyle 2, C McKeon 2, T O’Rourke 1, N Daly 1, C Connolly 1, C Cox 1, B Stack 1.	Report	Pts: C Thompson 2, J Brennan 1, M Langan 1 (1f), E Ban Gallagher 1, C McGonagle 1, J McKelvey 1, C O’Donnell 1, J Brennan 1.	Referee: Joe McQuillan (Cavan)

26 March 2023 Round 7	Tyrone	0-18 (18) – (16) 0-16	Armagh	Omagh
13:45 IST (UTC+1)				Venue: O'Neill's Healy Park
	Pts: D McCurry 7 (4f); P Harte 3; C Kilpatrick 2, R McNamee 2: P Hampsey 1, M Donnelly 1, D Canavan 1, M McGleenan 1.	Report	Pts: C Turbitt 5 (2f, 1 m); S Campbell 3: A Forker 2, R Grugan 2: C Cumiskey 1, J Hall 1, J Kiernan 1; N Grimley 1 (1f).	Referee: Barry Cassidy (Derry)

=== Final ===
TG4

2 April 2023
16:00 IST (UTC+1)
NFL Final

Report

Mayo	0-14 (14) – (11) 0-11	Galway
(HT: 0-08 – 0-05)
Pts: R O’Donoghue 7 (5fs, 2mks), C Reape 3 (2fs, 45), J Carr 1, P Durcan 1, J Flynn 1, J Coyne 1		Pts: S Walsh 5 (2fs, 1 45), R Finnerty 2 (1mk), S Kelly 1, J Maher 1, P Cooke 1, T Culhane 1

Croke Park, Dublin
Referee: Brendan Cawley (Kildare)
Attendance: 45,041

=== Top scorers ===
Overall

Rank	Player	Team	Tally	Total	Matches	Average
1	Ryan O'Donoghue	Mayo	2-30	36	8	4.50
2	Darren McCurry	Tyrone	0-33	33	7	4.71
3	Rían O'Neill	Armagh	0-25	25	6	4.16
4	Matthew Tierney	Galway	3-14	23	8	2.87
5	Diarmuid Murtagh	Roscommon	1-18	21	7	3.00
6	David Clifford	Kerry	1-14	17	5	3.40
7	James Carr	Mayo	3-07	16	7	2.28
7	Conor McManus	Monaghan	1-13	16	5	3.20
7	Micheál Bannigan	Monaghan	0-16	16	7	2.28
10	Seán O'Shea	Kerry	1-12	15	5	3.00
10	Darragh Canavan	Tyrone	0-15	15	7	2.14

In a single game

Rank	Player	Team	Tally	Total	Opposition
1	Conor McManus	Monaghan	1-07	10	Mayo
2	Darren McCurry	Tyrone	0-07	7	Armagh
2	Darren McCurry	Tyrone	0-07	7	Donegal
2	Jack McCarron	Monaghan	0-07	7	Donegal
2	Cillian O'Connor	Mayo	0-07	7	Roscommon
2	Ryan O'Donoghue	Mayo	0-07	7	Armagh
2	Ryan O'Donoghue	Mayo	0-07	7	Galway
8	Donal O'Sullivan	Kerry	1-03	6	Monaghan
8	Matthew Tierney	Galway	1-03	6	Donegal
8	Ryan O'Donoghue	Mayo	1-03	6	Kerry
8	Ryan O'Donoghue	Mayo	1-03	6	Donegal
8	Matthew Tierney	Galway	0-06	6	Tyrone
8	Ryan O'Donoghue	Mayo	0-06	6	Galway
8	Rían O'Neill	Armagh	0-06	6	Mayo
8	Conor Cox	Roscommon	0-06	6	Kerry
8	Paul Towey	Mayo	0-06	6	Monaghan

== Division 2 ==
=== Table ===
Pos	Team	Pld	W	D	L	PF	PA	PD	Pts	Qualification
1	Derry	7	6	1	0	120	69	+51	13	Advance to NFL Division 2 Final and promotion to 2024 NFL Division 1
2	Dublin	7	6	0	1	125	95	+30	12	Advance to NFL Division 2 Final and promotion to 2024 NFL Division 1
3	Louth	7	4	0	3	102	99	+3	8	
4	Cork	7	3	1	3	137	101	+36	7	
5	Kildare	7	3	0	4	87	98	−11	6	
6	Meath	7	2	1	4	107	129	−22	5	
7	Clare	7	2	0	5	98	106	−8	4	Relegation to 2024 NFL Division 3
8	Limerick	7	0	1	6	85	153	−68	1	Relegation to 2024 NFL Division 3

Source: GAA
Rules for classification: Tiebreakers

=== Matches ===
==== Round 1 ====
28 January 2023	Dublin	1-11 (14) – (13) 0-13	Kildare	Dublin
				Venue: Croke Park
	Gls: B Fenton 1. Pts: C Costello 4 (3fs), C O'Callaghan 2, D Rock 1 (f), J Small 1, N Scully 1, C Kilkenny 1, R McGarry 1.	Report	Pts: N Flynn 4 (2 '45s, 1f); J Hyland 3 (1f), D Kirwan 3 (1f), J Robinson 3.	Referee: Brendan Griffin (Kerry); Attendance: 17,161

28 January 2023	Derry	0-16 (16) – (4) 0-04	Limerick	Derry
				Venue: Celtic Park
	Pts: S McGuigan 9 (5f), N Toner 4 (1f), P Cassidy 2, L Murray 1.	Report	Pts: I Corbett 1, G Browne 1, A Enright 1, J Naughton 1.	Referee: Noel Mooney (Cavan)

29 January 2023	Cork	0-19 (19) – (23) 3-14	Meath	Cork
				Venue: Páirc Uí Chaoimh
	Pts: S Sherlock 14 (10fs, 1 45), C Óg Jones 2, M Shanley 1, M Taylor 1, S Powter 1.	Report	Gls: S Walsh 1, J Morris, C O'Sullivan 1. Pts: S Walsh 7 (7, 2fs, 2ms); J Morris 2, M Costello 2 (1f), C O’Sullivan 1, C Hickey 1, J O’Connor 1.	Referee: Brendan Cawley (Kildare)

29 January 2023	Clare	0-13 (13) – (12) 1-09	Louth	Ennis
				Venue: Cusack Park
	Pts: E McMahon 3 (2fs), G Cooney 2 (1m), J Malone 2, K Sexton 2, E Cleary 2 (2fs), M McInerney 1 (45), D Walsh 1.	Report	Gls: C Downey 1. Pts: S Mulroy 5 (3fs), C Early 2, D McConnan 1 (f), D Campbell 1.	Referee: Seán Lonergan (Tipperary)

==== Round 2 ====
5 February 2023 Round 2	Meath	4-08 (20) – (16) 0-16	Clare	Navan
14:00 IST (UTC)				Venue: Páirc Tailteann
	Gls: D Lenihan 2, J Morris 1, J Scully 1. Pts: D Lenihan 2 (2fs); J Morris 2 (1m, 1f), J Scully 1, J O'Connor 1, D McGowan 1, D Campion 1.	Report	Pts: E McMahon 5 (3fs); G Cooney 3 (2fs); M McInerney 2 (2fs); J Malone 1, D Coughlan 1, A Griffin 1, P Lillis 1, P Collins 1, D Bohannon 1.	Referee: Niall Cullen (Fermanagh)

5 February 2023 Round 2	Kildare	0-07 (7) – (20) 2-14	Cork	Newbridge
14:00 IST (UTC)				Venue: St Conleth's Park
	Pts: J Robinson 3, J Hyland 2 (1f); B McCormack 1, D Kirwan 1.	Report	Gls: C O'Mahony 1, S Powter 1. Pts: S Sherlock 4 (1f, 1 45), B Hurley 4 (1m, 1f, 1 45), B O’Driscoll 3, C O'Mahony 1, C O’Callaghan 1, L Fahy 1.	Referee: Jerome Henry (Mayo)

5 February 2023 Round 2	Louth	1-11 (14) – (17) 2-11	Derry	Ardee
14:00 IST (UTC)				Venue: Páirc Mhuire
	Gls: L Jackson 1. Pts: D McConnon 3 (2f), S Mulroy 3 (1m ,1f), T Jackson 2, C Lennon 1, C Grimes 1, N Sharkey 1.	Report	Gls: S McGuigan 1 (pen), N Toner 1. Pts: S McGuigan 5 (3fs), P Cassidy 2, P McGrogan 2, N Toner 1, O McWilliams 1.	Referee: Paul Faloon (Down)

5 February 2023 Round 2	Limerick	1-11 (14) – (23) 2-17	Dublin	Limerick
15:00 IST (UTC)				Venue: TUS Gaelic Grounds
	Gls: H Bourke 1. Pts: J Naughton 5 (4fs), C Sheehan 2, Enright 2, H Bourke 1, I Corbett 1.	Report	Gls: D Rock 1 (pen), B Fenton 1. Pts: D Rock 5 (3fs), R McGarry 4, C O’Callaghan 4, L O’Dell 1, C McEneaney 1, D Newcombe 1, Killian O’Gara 1.	Referee: James Molloy (Galway); Attendance: 3,670

==== Round 3 ====
18 February 2023 Round 3	Derry	2-15 (21) – (10) 1-07	Meath	Dungiven
				Venue: Owenbeg COE
	Gls: E Doherty 1, N Toner 1. Pts: S McGuigan 3, P Cassidy 3, B Heron 3, E Doherty 2, P McGrogan 2, E McEvoy 1, O McWilliams 1.	Report	Gls: T O'Reilly 1. Pts: D Lenihan 2, D Moriarty 1, T O’Reilly 1, R Jones 1, A Lennon 1 (f), B Conlon 1.	Referee: Liam Devenney (Mayo)

19 February 2023 Round 3	Louth	1-15 (18) – (16) 1-13	Limerick	Ardee
				Venue: St. Mary's Park
	Gls: D Corcoran 1 Pts: S Mulroy 6 (5fs), D McConnon 3, C McCaul 1, N Sharkey 1, T Durnin 1, C Downey 1, T Jackson 1, P Lynch 1.	Report	Gls: B Donovan 1 Pts: J Naughton 3 (3fs), H Bourke 2, McSweeney 2, C Downes 1, A Enright 1, G Brown 1, C Sheehan 1, P Nash 1, I Corbett 1.	Referee: Martin McNally (Monaghan)

19 February 2023 Round 3	Clare	0-15 (15) – (16) 0-16	Kildare	Ennis
				Venue: Cusack Park
	Pts: E Cleary 8 (6fs), E McMahon 2 (1f), G Cooney 2, R Lanigan 1, P Collins 1, D Coughlan 1.	Report	Pts: J Hyland 4 (4fs), N Flynn 4 (2fs), P Woodgate 2 (1f), D Flynn 2, J Robinson 1, K Feely 1, D Kirwan 1, D Hyland 1.	Referee: David Murnane (Cork)

18 February 2023 Round 3	Cork	2-10 (16) – (18) 0-18	Dublin	Cork
				Venue: Páirc Uí Chaoimh
	Gls: E McSweeney 1, M Taylor 1. Pts: B Hurley 8 (3fs, 1m), E McSweeney 1, S Sherlock 1 (f).	Report	Pts: D Rock 6 (4fs), C O’Callaghan 4 (1m), D Newcombe 2, C Murphy 1, B Fenton 1, R McGarry 1, C Costello 1, J McCarthy 1, J McCaffrey 1.	Referee: Seamus Mulhare (Laois); Attendance: 10,232

==== Round 4 ====
25 February 2023 Round 4	Dublin	0-16 (16) – (15) 1-12	Clare	Dublin
				Venue: Croke Park
	Pts: D Rock 8 (5f, 1 45), C O'Callaghan 1, S Lowry 1, B Fenton 1, J McCarthy 1, L Gannon 1, C Basquel 1, C Kilkenny 1, C Costello 1.	Report	Gls: G Cooney 1. Pts: E McMahon 4 (1f), E Cleary 4 (1f), G Cooney 2, D Coughlan 1, P Collins 1.	Referee: Paul Faloon (Down)

26 February 2023 Round 4	Kildare	0-07 (7) – (21) 2-15	Derry	Newbridge
14:00 IST (UTC+1)				Venue: St Conleth's Park
	Pts: D Kirwan 3 (3fs), N Flynn 2 (2fs), A Beirne 1, P McDermott 1.	Report	Gls: S McGuigan 1, N Loughlin 1. Pts: S McGuigan 7 (4fs, 1m), E Doherty 3, B Heron 2, N Toner 2 (1f), E McEvoy 1	Referee: Barry Judge (Sligo)

26 February 2023 Round 4	Meath	1-12 (15) – (18) 1-15	Louth	Navan
14:00 IST (UTC+1)				Venue: Páirc Tailteann
	Gls: D Keogan 1. Pts: S Walsh 3 (1f), J Morris 3, J Flynn 2, M Costello 2 (1f), R Jones 1, J Scully 1.	Report	Gls: C Lennon 1. Pts: S Mulroy 3 (2f), C Downey 3, D McConnon 3, L Jackson 1, C McCaul 1, C Grimes 1, T Durnin 1, D McKenny 1, C Lennon 1.	Referee: Joe McQuillan (Cavan)

26 February 2023 Round 4	Cork	6-18 (36) – (12) 0-12	Limerick	Cork
15:45IST (UTC+1)				Venue: Páirc Uí Chaoimh
	Gls: C Corbett 2, C O’Callaghan 1, I Maguire 1, S Powter 1, B Hurley 1. Pts: C Óg Jones 6, S Sherlock 5 (2f); C O’Callaghan 1, I Maguire 1, S Powter 1, B Hurley 1, M Taylor 1, E McSweeney 1, C Corbett 1,	Report	Pts: C Fahy 3, T McCarthy 1, I Corbett 1, C McSweeney 1, J Naughton 1 (f), C Sheehan 1, B Donovan 1, H Bourke 1, M Donovan 1, D O’Mahony (own point) 1.	Referee: Brendan Griffin (Kerry); Attendance: 7,347

==== Round 5 ====
4 March 2023 Round 5	Derry	1-11 (14) – (13) 0-13	Dublin	Derry
				Venue: Celtic Park
	Gls: N Toner 1. Pts: S McGuigan 3 (3fs), P Cassidy 2, N Loughlin 1 (1f), C Doherty 1, B Rogers 1, E Doherty 1, O McWilliams 1, L Murray 1.	Report	Pts: C Costello 3 (1f), L Gannon 2, C Kilkenny 2, B Fenton 2, J Small 1, C O’Callaghan 1, C Bascal 1, T Lahiff 1.	Referee: Sean Hurson (Tyrone); Attendance: 12,077

5 March 2023 Round 5	Limerick	0-17 (17) – (17) 2-11	Meath	Limerick
				Venue: TUS Gaelic Grounds
	Pts: J Naughton 6 (4fs), C Downes 2, B Donovan 2, H Bourke 1, C Sheehan 1, C Fahy 1, I Corbett 1, A Enright 1, P Maher 1, D Lyons 1.	Report	Gls: M Costello 1, D Lenihan 1. Pts: M Costello 3 (2fs), J Morris 3, D Moriarty 2, J Flynn 1, R Jones 1, J O’Connor 1.	Referee: Derek O'Mahony (Tipperary); Attendance: 1,029

5 March 2023 Round 5	Louth	2-11 (17) – (12) 0-12	Kildare	Ardee
				Venue: DEFY Páirc Mhuire
	Gls: T Durnin 1, C Grimes 1. Pts: T Durnin 2, D McConnon 2 (1f, 1m), S Mulroy 2 (2fs), R Burns 1, C Lennon 1, C Downey 1, B Duffy 1, N Sharkey 1.	Report	Pts: N Flynn 3 (2f), P Woodgate 3 (2f), D Kirwan 2, D Flynn 1, B Coffey 1, J Sargent 1, B McCormack 1.	Referee: Barry Tiernan (Dublin); Attendance: 2,500

5 March 2023 Round 5	Clare	1-08 (11) – (19) 3-10	Cork	Ennis
				Venue: Cusack Park
	Gls: K Sexton 1 (pen); Pts: E Cleary 4 (2fs), E McMahon 2 (1f), K Sexton 1, D Bohannon 1.	Report	Gls: S Powter 2, M Taylor 1. Pts: B Hurley 3 (3f), C Óg Jones 3, E McSweeney 2, R Deane 1, J O’Rourke 1.	Referee: Liam Devenney (Mayo); Attendance: 2,596

==== Round 6 ====
18 March 2023 Round 6	Meath	1-11 (14) – (25) 2-19	Dublin	Navan
15:30 IST (UTC+1)				Venue: Pairc Tailteann
	Gls: M Costello 1. Pts: J Flynn 3 (1 45), M Costello 2 (1f), D Moriarty 2 (1f) A Lynch 2, C Hickey 1, D Lenihan 1.	Report	Gls: C Costello 1, K O'Gara 1. Pts: B Fenton 4 (1f), C O’Callaghan 4, C Costello 4 (1 45, 1f), K O’Gara 3, L Gannon 2; C Kilkenny 1, S Bugler 1.	Referee: Conor Lane (Cork)

19 March 2023 Round 6	Limerick	2-7 (13) – (19) 3-10	Kildare	Limerick
15:45 IST (UTC+1)				Venue: TUS Gaelic Grounds
	Gls: J Naughton 1, C Fahy 1. Pts: J Naughton 3 (2 fs), C Fahy 1 (1m), C McSweeney 1, B Coleman 1, B Donovan 1.	Report	Gls: D Kirwan 1, K Flynn 1, J Robinson 1. Pts: D Kirwan 3, K Flynn 1, J Robinson 1 (1f), B Coffey 1, P Woodgate 1 (1f), B McCormack 1, N Flynn 1, D Hyland 1.	Referee: John Ryan (Cork)

19 March 2023 Round 6	Louth	1-10 (13) – (10) 0-10	Cork	Ardee
13:00 IST (UTC+1)				Venue: DEFY Páirc Mhuire
	Gls: R Burns 1. Pts: C Downey 2 (1f), T Durnin 2, L Jackson 2, C Early 1, C Grimes 1, C Lennon, D McConnon 1.	Report	Pts: S Sherlock 4 (2 fs, 1 45), L Fahy 2, C Corbett 1, C Óg Jones 1, R Maguire 1, T Walsh 1.	Referee: Fergal Kelly (Longford)

19 March 2023 Round 6	Derry	0-14 (14) – (4) 0-04	Clare	Dungiven
13:00 IST (UTC+1)				Venue: Owenbeg COE
	Pts: S McGuigan 0-5 (2f), E Doherty 3, C Doherty 1, G McKinless 1, C Glass 1, B Heron 1, P Cassidy 1, N Loughlin 1.	Report	Pts: E McMahon 2, P Lillis 1, D Coughlan 1.	Referee: Paul Faloon (Down)

==== Round 7 ====
26 March 2023 Round 7	Dublin	0-16 (16) – (9) 1-06	Louth	Dublin
14:00 IST (UTC+1)				Venue: Croke Park
	Pts: C Basquel 3, S Bugler 2, C Costello 2 (1f), P Small 1, D Newcombe 1, J McCarthy 1, B Fenton 1, C O’Callaghan 1, K O’Gara 1, P Mannion 1, L O’Dell 1, D Rock 1 (’45).	Report	Gls: L Jackson 1. Pts: C Downey 3 (2f), D McConnon 1, L Jackson 1, J Califf 1 (f).	Referee: Paul Faloon (Down)

26 March 2023 Round 7	Clare	2-18 (24) – (9) 0-09	Limerick	Ennis
14:00 IST (UTC+1)				Venue: Cusack Park
	Gls: M McInerney 1, Downes 1. Pts: K Sexton 5 (2f), E McMahon 5 (1f), A Griffin 3, M McInerney 2 (1f, 1m), D Walsh 1, P Collins 1, S Griffin 1.	Report	Pts: J Naughton 5 (2f), P Nash 2 (1m), K Ryan 1, C Sheehan 1.	Referee: Barry Judge (Sligo)

26 March 2023 Round 7	Cork	1-14 (17) – (17) 1-14	Derry	Cork
14:00 IST (UTC+1)				Venue: Páirc Uí Chaoimh
	Gls: I Maguire 1. Pts: S Sherlock 4 (4fs); C Corbett 3 (1f); C O’Callaghan 2, K O’Hanlon 2, K O’Donovan 1, S Powter 1, C Kiely 1.	Report	Gls: S Downey 1. Pts: S McGuigan 4 (1f), N Toner 3, E Doherty 2, P McGrogan 1, S Downey 1, B Rogers 1, L Murray 1, P Cassidy 1.	Referee: A Nolan (Wicklow)

26 March 2023 Round 7	Kildare	0-13 (13) – (8) 0-08	Meath	Newbridge
14:00 IST (UTC+1)				Venue: St. Conleth's Park
	Pts: D Kirwan 5 (1f); J Robinson 3 (1m, 2fs); P Woodgate 2 (2fs); J Hyland 1 (f), D Hyland 1, P Cribben 1.	Report	Pts: D Lenihan 4 (4fs); C O’Sullivan 1, J Flynn 1 (f), R Jones 1, M Costello 1 (f).	Referee: J Gilmartin (Sligo)

=== Final ===
TG4

2 April 2023
13:45 IST (UTC+1)

Report

Derry	0-11 (11) – (18) 4-06	Dublin
(HT: 0-06 – 0-04)
Pts: S McGuigan 6 (3f), P Cassidy 2, N Toner 1 (1f), C Glass 1, P McGrogan 1.		Gls: K O'Gara 1, J Small 1, P Mannion 1 (pen), L O'Dell 1 Pts: K O'Gara 1, J Small 1, T Lahiff 1, C Kilkenny 1, B Fenton 1, L Gannon 1.

Croke Park, Dublin
Referee: Liam Devenney (Mayo)
Attendance: 45,041

=== Top scorers ===
Overall

Rank	Player	Team	Tally	Total	Matches	Average
1	Shane McGuigan	Derry	2-42	48	8	6.00
2	Steven Sherlock	Cork	0-32	32	6	5.33
3	James Naughton	Limerick	1-24	27	7	3.85
4	Dean Rock	Dublin	1-21	24	6	4.00
5	Darragh Kirwan	Kildare	1-18	21	6	3.50
5	Emmet McMahon	Clare	0-21	21	7	3.00
7	Niall Toner	Derry	3-11	20	8	2.50
8	Brian Hurley	Cork	1-16	19	5	3.80
8	Sam Mulroy	Louth	0-19	19	5	3.80
10	Donal Lenihan	Meath	3-09	18	5	3.60
10	Cormac Costello	Dublin	1-15	18	6	3.00
10	Eoin Cleary	Clare	0-18	18	5	3.60

In a single game

Rank	Player	Team	Tally	Total	Opposition
1	Steven Sherlock	Cork	0-14	14	Meath
2	Shane Walsh	Meath	1-07	10	Cork
2	Shane McGuigan	Derry	1-07	10	Kildare
4	Shane McGuigan	Derry	0-09	9	Limerick
5	Donal Lenihan	Meath	2-02	8	Clare
5	Shane McGuigan	Derry	1-05	8	Louth
5	Dean Rock	Dublin	1-05	8	Limerick
5	Eoin Cleary	Clare	0-08	8	Kildare
5	Brian Hurley	Cork	0-08	8	Dublin
5	Dean Rock	Dublin	0-08	8	Clare

== Division 3 ==
=== Table ===
Pos	Team	Pld	W	D	L	PF	PA	PD	Pts	Qualification
1	Fermanagh	7	6	0	1	114	94	+20	12	Advance to NFL Division 3 Final and promotion to 2024 NFL Division 2
2	Cavan	7	5	0	2	130	94	+36	10	Advance to NFL Division 3 Final and promotion to 2024 NFL Division 2
3	Down	7	5	0	2	129	114	+15	10	
4	Westmeath	7	4	0	3	135	79	+56	8	
5	Offaly	7	4	0	3	105	115	−10	8	
6	Antrim	7	2	0	5	124	158	−34	4	
7	Longford	7	1	1	5	104	142	−38	3	Relegation to 2024 NFL Division 4
8	Tipperary	7	0	1	6	83	128	−45	1	Relegation to 2024 NFL Division 4

Source: GAA
Rules for classification: Tiebreakers

=== Matches ===
==== Round 1 ====
28 January 2023 Round 1	Fermanagh	0-15 (15) – (8) 0-08	Longford	Ederney
				Venue: St Joseph's Park
	Pts: S Quigley 7 (7fs), D McGurn 2, S Cassidy 1, R Jones 1, R Lyons 1, J Cassidy 1, U Kelm 1, C McManus 1.	Report	Pts: D McGivney 4 (4fs), I O’Sullivan 2, D Farrell 1 (1f), K McGann 1.	Referee: John Gilmartin (Sligo)

28 January 2023 Round 1	Tipperary	1-11 (14) – (17) 2-11	Down	Thurles
				Venue: FBD Semple Stadium
	Gls: T Doyle 1. Pts: C Sweeney 4 (3f), M Russell 2, D Leahy 2, S O’Connor 1 (f), J Kennedy 1 (f), M O’Shea 1.	Report	Gls: C Francis 1, P Havern 1. Pts: P Havern 4 (1f, 1m), A Gilmore 3 (2f); E Brown 2, B O’Hagan 1 (f), O Murdock 1.	Referee: C Maguire (Clare); Attendance: 1,013

29 January 2023 Round 1	Westmeath	1-06 (9) – (12) 0-12	Cavan	Mullingar
				Venue: TEG Cusack Park
	Gls: R Wallace 1 Pts: J Heslin 2 (2fs), L Dolan 2, S Dempsey 1, R O’Toole 1.	Report	Pts: R Galligan 3 (3fs), D McVeety 2, R O’Neill 2 (1m), O Brady 2 (2fs), P Faulkner 1, M Reilly 1, C Brady 1 (f).	Referee: S Mulhare (Laois)

29 January 2023 Round 1	Antrim	0-12 (12) – (18) 2-12	Offaly	Belfast
				Venue: Corrigan Park
	Pts: R Murray 3 (3f), D McEnhill 2 (1f), R McCann (Aghagallon) 2, R McCann (Creggan) 1 (f), P Shivers 1, J McAuley 1, P McBride 1, C Stewart 1.	Report	Gls: B Allen, R McNamee 1. Pts: D Hyland 4 (2f), A Sullivan 3, N Dunne 2 (2fs), R McNamee 1, J Maher 1, P Cunningham 1.	Referee: C Dourneen (Cavan)

==== Round 2 ====
4 February 2023 Round 2	Down	2-18 (24) – (23) 2-17	Antrim	Newry
18:00 IST (UTC)				Venue: Páirc Esler
	Gls: C Poland, A Gilmore 1. Pts: A Gilmore 4 (2f); B O’Hagan 3 (1f), L Kerr 3, O Murdock 3, P Havern 2, N Kane 1 (‘45), S Millar 1, E Brown 1.	Report	Gls: R McCann (Aghagallon) 2. Pts: D McEnhill 3 (1m), C Stewart 3, M Byrne 2 (1 ’45, 1f), R Murray 2 (1f), P Finnegan 2, R McCann (Creggan) 1 (1f), R McCann (Aghagallon) 1, A Loughran 1, J Finnegan 1, J McAuley 1.	Referee: B Tiernan

5 February 2023 Round 2	Cavan	1-19 (22) – (10) 1-07	Tipperary	Cavan
14:00 IST (UTC)				Venue: Kingspan Breffni Park
	Gls: R O'Neill 1. Pts: O Brady 7 (6f), D McVeety 3; R O’Neill 2 (1f); T Madden 2, R Galligan 1 (‘45), N Carolan 1, B Boylan 1, P Lynch 1, M Reilly 1.	Report	Gls: S O'Connor 1 Pts: J Kennedy 5 (5f), S O’Connor 1, M O’Shea 1.	Referee: B Judge (Sligo)

5 February 2023 Round 2	Offaly	1-09 (12) – (11) 1-08	Fermanagh	Tullamore
14:00 IST (UTC)				Venue: Glenisk O'Connor Park
	Gls: R McNamee 1, Pts: B Allen 5, P Cunningham 1, A Sullivan 1, C Farrell 1, B Carroll 1.	Report	Gls: J Largo-Ellis 1. Pts: G Jones 3 (1m), R Jones 2, R Lyons 1, U Kelm 1, S Quigley 1 (f).	Referee: T Murphy (Galway)

5 February 2023 Round 2	Longford	0-09 (9) – (28) 4-16	Westmeath	Longford
14:00 IST (UTC)				Venue: Pearse Park
	Pts: D Reynolds 4 (1m), D McGivney 2 (1f), D Galagher 1, D Mimnagh 1, J Hagan 1.	Report	Gls: J Heslin 1, S McCartan 1, L Dolan 1, L Loughlin 1. Pts: J Heslin 5 (5f), C McCormack 2, S Smith 2, S Baker 1, S McCartan 1, L Dolan 1, L Loughlin 1, N Harte 1, R O’Toole 1, R Connellan 1.	Referee: N McKenna

==== Round 3 ====
18 February 2023 Round 3	Tipperary	0-14 (14) – (22) 1-19	Antrim	Thurles
				Venue: FBD Semple Stadium
	Pts: J Kennedy 5 (3f), E Moloney 1, K Fahey 1, P Feehan 1, T Doyle 1, M O’Shea 1, L McGrath 1 (f), P Maher 1, D Leahy 1, M Kehoe 1.	Report	Gls: C Stewart 1. Pts: P Shivers 4, M Jordan 3, O Eastwood 3, M Byrne 2 (2f), R Murray 2 (1f), R McCann (Creggan) 2, D McEnhill 2, R McCann (Aghagallon) 1.	Referee: Brendan Griffin (Kerry)

19 February 2023 Round 3	Fermanagh	2-14 (20) – (19) 3-10	Down	Ederney
				Venue: St Joseph's Park
	Gls: C McGee 1, S Quigley 1. Pts: D McGurn 4 (1f, 1m); R Lyons 3 (1f, 1m), U Kelm 2, R McCaffrey 1, S McGullion 1, R Jones 1, C McShea 1, A Breen 1.	Report	Gls: O Murdock 1 (pen), P Laverty 1, C Francis 1. Pts: P Havern 4 (3f), N Kane 1 (45), R McEvoy 1 (f), S Annett 1, S Millar 1, L Kerr 1 (f), A Gilmore 1 (f).	Referee: C Dourneen (Cavan)

19 February 2023 Round 3	Cavan	1-19 (22) – (11) 0-11	Longford	Cavan
				Venue: Kingspan Breffni Park
	Gls: O Brady 1. Pts: Conor Madden 4, Cian Madden 3, P Lynch 3, O Brady 2 (2f), B Boylan 2, G Smith 2, D McVeety 1, D Brady 1, P Faulkner 1.	Report	Pts: R Smyth 3 (3f); D McGivney 2 (2f), J Hagan 2, L Connerton 2, D Reynolds 1, A Farrell 1.	Referee: K Faloon (Armagh)

19 February 2023 Round 3	Westmeath	2-12 (18) – (12) 0-12	Offaly	Mullingar
				Venue: TEG Cusack Park
	Gls: J Heslin 1, K Martin 1. Pts: J Heslin 4 (1-0pen, 4fs), R O'Toole 2, K Martin 1, R Connellan 1, S Baker 1, C McCormack 1, L Loughlin 1 ('45'), S Smith 1.	Report	Pts: D Hyland 6 (3fs, 1'45'), A Sullivan 4, C McNamee 1, N Dunne 1 (f).	Referee: David Coldrick (Meath)

==== Round 4 ====
25 February 2023 Round 4	Antrim	3-09 (18) – (19) 2-13	Fermanagh	Belfast
				Venue: Corrigan Park
	Gls: O Eastwood 1, J Finnegan 1, P Healy 1. Pts: C Stewart 2, P Shivers 2 (1f), M Byrne 1 (45), R McCann (Aghagallon) 1 (m), R McCann (Creggan) 1, M Jordan 1, C McLarnon 1 (m).	Report	Gls: S Quigley 1, U Kelm 1. Pts: A Breen 3, G Jones 3 (1f), U Kelm 2, L Cullen 1, S McGullion 1, R Lyons 1 (1f), C Corrigan 1, C McGee 1.	Referee: K Eannetta (Tyrone)

25 February 2023 Round 4	Down	1-10 (13) – (11) 0-11	Westmeath	Newry
				Venue: Páirc Esler
	Gls: O Murdoch 1 (pen). Pts: A Gilmore 4 (1f), P Havern 3 (3f), C Doherty 2, E Brown 1.	Report	Pts: J Heslin 6 (4f), S Baker 2, S McCartan 1, C McCormack 1, D Lynch 1.	Referee: David Gough (Meath)

26 February 2023 Round 4	Offaly	0-14 (14) – (21) 0-21	Cavan	Tullamore
				Venue: Glenisk O'Connor Park
	Pts: D Hyland 6 (4f); A Sullivan 2 (1f and 1m); D Hogan 1, P Cunningham 1 (f), J McEvoy 1, J Maher 1, R McNamee 1 (f), B Allen 1.	Report	Pts: P Lynch 10 (7f), R O'Neill 2, J McCabe 2, E Boylan 2, R Galligan 1 (45), D Brady 1, G Smith 1, C Madden 1, C Madden 1.	Referee: J Killeen (Sligo)

26 February 2023 Round 4	Longford	0-14 (14) – (14) 1-11	Tipperary	Longford
				Venue: Pearse Park
	Pts: R Smyth 3 (2f); J Hagan 2, D Reynolds 2, D McGivney 2 (2f), R Brady 2, D Mimnagh 1, O Kenny 1, D Farrell 1.	Report	Gls: T Doyle 1. Pts: J Kennedy 7 (6f, 145), P Feehan 2, E Maloney 1, D Leahy 1.	Referee: J Ryan (Cork)

==== Round 5 ====
5 March 2023 Round 5	Fermanagh	2-11 (17) – (8) 0-08	Tipperary	Ederney
				Venue: St Joseph's Park
	Gls: A Breen 1, S Quigley 1. Pts: A Breen 2, S McGullion 2, C Corrigan 2 (1m), L Cullen 1, S Quigley 1 (m), J Largo-Elis 1, T McCaffrey 1, D King 1.	Report	Pts: J Kennedy 2 (1f), T Doyle 2, M O’Reilly 1 (f), K Fahey 1, M Stokes 1, S Quirke 1 (1m).	Referee: K Faloon (Armagh)

5 March 2023 Round 5	Cavan	2-14 (20) – (13) 1-10	Down	Cavan
				Venue: Kingspan Breffni Park
	Gls: P Lynch 2. Pts: P Lynch 5 (4f), D McVeety 2 (1f), C Madden 2, G McKiernan 2 (1m), R Galligan 1 (1f), B Boylan 1, J Smith 1.	Report	Gls: R Mooney 1. Pts: P Havern 5 (3f), A Gilmore 3 (3f), D McAleenan 1 (f), R McEvoy 1.	Referee: Paddy Neilan (Roscommon)

5 March 2023 Round 5	Westmeath	4-27 (39) – (8) 0-08	Antrim	Mullingar
				Venue: TEG Cusack Park
	Gls: J Heslin 1, S McCartan 1, D Lynch 1, S Baker 1. Pts: J Heslin 12 (8f), R O’Toole 4, S Dempsey 3, S McCartan 2, L Loughlin 2, T Molloy 2, J Dolan 1, S Duncan 1.	Report	Pts: P Shivers 4 (2f); O Eastwood 2 (1f); C Stewart 1, R McCann 1.	Referee: A Nolan (Wicklow)

5 March 2023 Round 5	Longford	1-16 (19) – (20) 2-14	Offaly	Longford
				Venue: Glennon Brothers Pearse Park
	Gls: D Mimnagh 1. Pts: D McGivney 6 (6f), J Hagan 3, D Farrell 2, M Quinn 1, D Reynolds 1, R Brady 1, O Kenny 1, K McGann 1.	Report	Gls: J Bryant 1, B Allen 1. Pts: B Allen 3, N Dunne 3 (1f), A Sullivan 2, D Hyland 2 (1f), J Evans 1, P Cunningham 1, J McEvoy 1 (m), C Farrell 1.	Referee: S Lonergan (Tipperary)

==== Round 6 ====
18 March 2023 Round 6	Antrim	1-17 (20) – (18) 2-12	Cavan	Belfast
				Venue: Corrigan Park
	Gls: R McCann (Aghagallon) 1. Pts: O Eastwood 6 (2f), P McBride 5, D McEnhill 2, M Jordan 1, P McCormick 1, R McCann (Creggan) 1 (f), S McGarry 1.	Report	Gls: C Madden 1, P Lynch 1. Pts: C Madden 2, C Madden 3, G McKiernan 2 (2fs), R Galligan 2 (2 45s), P Lynch 1, J McKenna 1, C Smith 1

18 March 2023 Round 6	Down	1-19 (22) – (17) 1-14	Longford	Newry
				Venue: Páirc Esler
	Gls: L Keerr 1 )pen). Pts: P Havern 5 (2f), L Kerr 5 (4f), R Johnston 2, M Rooney 2, J Johnston 1, E Brown 1, N Kane 1 (45), M Ireland 1, C McCrickard 1.	Report	Gls: D Reynolds 1. Pts: D Farrell 5 (3f), D Reynolds 1, D Gallagher 1, K McGann 1, M Quinn 1, J Macken 1, F Sheridan 1, D O’Brien 1, D Mimnagh 1, O Kenny 1.	Referee: S Laverty (Antrim)

18 March 2023 Round 6	Fermanagh	0-15 (15) – (14) 2-08	Westmeath	Enniskillen
				Venue: Brewster Park
	Pts: U Kelm 3, D McGurn 3 (1f), R Lyons 3 (3f), A Breen 2 (1’45), L Cullen 1, C Cullen 1, S McGullion 1, C McManus 1.	Report	Gls: K Maguire 1, D Lynch 1. Pts: J Heslin 3 (3f), R Wallace 2, R O’Toole 2 (1m), L Loughlin 1

18 March 2023 Round 6	Tipperary	0-13 (13) – (20) 2-14	Offaly	Thurles
				Venue: FBD Semple Stadium
	Pts: J Kennedy 3 (2f), S Quirke 3, M O'Reilly 2 (1f and 1 '45'), M Russell 2, C Cadell 1, S O'Connor 1, C Deely 1 each.	Report	Gls: R McNamee 1, A Sullivan 1. Pts: N Dunne 4 (1m, 1f), R McNamee 3, D Hyland 4 (2f), A Sullivan 1, B Allen 1, J Maher 1.	Referee: James Molloy (Galway)

This was Offaly's first game since manager Liam Kearns' death that week. He had also managed Tipp.

==== Round 7 ====
26 March 2023 Round 7	Cavan	2-09 (15) – (17) 1-14	Fermanagh	Cavan
14:00 IST (UTC+1)				Venue: Kingspan Breffni Park
	Gls: J McCabe 1, K Clarke 1. Pts: O Brady 5 (5f); G McKiernan 2 (1f); R O’Neill 1, R Galligan 1 (45).	Report	Gls: U Kelm 1. Pts: R Lyons 4 (2f), U Kelm 3; R Jones 3; D McGurn 2; S Quigley 1 (f), A Breen 1.	Referee: T Murphy (Galway)

26 March 2023 Round 7	Westmeath	1-13 (16) – (10) 0-10	Tipperary	Mullingar
14:00 IST (UTC+1)				Venue: TEG Cusack Park
	Gls: L Dolan 1. Pts: R O’Toole 4 (1f); R Wallace 3; L Loughlin 2, S Smith 2 (1f); S McCartan 1, S Dempsey 1.	Report	Pts: J Kennedy 4 (4fs); S Quirke 2; P Feehan 1, M O’Shea 1, C Deely 1, S O’Connor 1.	Referee: C Dournee (Cavan)

26 March 2023 Round 7	Offaly	0-09 (9) – (21) 1-18	Down	Tullamore
14:00 IST (UTC+1)				Venue: Glenisk O’Connor Park
	Pts: N Dunne 3 (3f), B Allen 2, C Donohoe 1, C Farrell 1 (f), J Bryant 1, A Sullivan 1.	Report	Gls: L Kerr 1. Pts: E Branagan 3, C McRickard 3, R Johnston 2, D Magill 2, P Havern 2, R Mason 2 (1f), N Kane 1 (f), R McEvoy 1, M Rooney 1, A Morgan 1.	Referee: S Mulhare (Laois)

26 March 2023 Round 7	Longford	3-17 (26) – (21) 3-12	Antrim	Longford
14:00 IST (UTC+1)				Venue: Glennon Brothers Pearse Park
	Gls: K McGann 2, D Doherty 1. Pts: D O’Brien 4 (3m), D Farrell 4 (4f, ‘45); K McGann 2; D Doherty 2; O Kenny 2 (2fs), P Fox 1, F Sheridan 1, D Gallagher 1 (f).	Report	Gls: R McCann 1, P McCormick 1, C McLarnon 1. Pts: R McCann 4 (4f); O Eastwood 2, R Murray 2 (2f); P McCormick 1, C McLarnon 1; P McBride 1, P Healy 1.	Referee: N McKenna (Monaghan)

=== Final ===
TG4

1 April 2023
19:15 IST (UTC+1)

Report

Fermanagh	1-07 (10) – (16) 0-16	Cavan
Gls: D McGurn 1. Pts: R Lyons 3 (2f), S McNally 1 (1f), A Breen 1, R Jones 1, S Quigley 1.		Pts: R Galligan 4 (2f, 2 45), P Lynch 3 (2f), O Brady 2, G McKiernan 2 (1f), R O'Neill 1, J Smith 1, D McVeety 1, C Smith 1, C Madden 1.

Croke Park, Dublin
Referee: A Nolan (Wicklow)

=== Top scorers ===
Overall

Rank	Player	Team	Tally	Total	Matches	Average
1	John Heslin	Westmeath	3-32	41	6	6.83
2	Paddy Lynch	Cavan	3-23	32	7	4.57
3	Pat Havern	Down	1-25	27	7	3.85
3	Jack Kennedy	Tipperary	0-27	27	7	3.85
5	Dylan Hyland	Offaly	0-22	22	7	3.14
6	Oisín Brady	Cavan	1-18	21	5	4.20
7	Seán Quigley	Fermanagh	3-11	20	8	2.50
8	Ultan Kelm	Fermanagh	2-12	18	8	2.25
8	Bernard Allen	Offaly	2-12	18	7	2.58
8	Andrew Gilmore	Down	1-15	18	5	3.60

In a single game

Rank	Player	Team	Tally	Total	Opposition
1	John Heslin	Westmeath	1-12	15	Antrim
2	Paddy Lynch	Cavan	2-05	11	Down
3	Paddy Lynch	Cavan	0-10	10	Offaly
4	Keelin McGann	Longford	2-02	8	Antrim
4	John Heslin	Westmeath	1-05	8	Longford
6	Ruairí McCann (A)	Antrim	2-01	7	Down
6	Ruairí McCann (A)	Antrim	1-04	7	Longford
6	Pat Havern	Down	1-04	7	Tipperary
6	Andrew Gilmore	Down	1-04	7	Antrim
6	John Heslin	Westmeath	1-04	7	Offaly
6	Seán Quigley	Fermanagh	0-07	7	Longford
6	Jack Kennedy	Tipperary	0-07	7	Longford
6	Oisín Brady	Cavan	0-07	7	Tipperary

== Division 4 ==
=== Table ===
Pos	Team	Pld	W	D	L	PF	PA	PD	Pts	Qualification
1	Sligo	7	6	0	1	120	93	+27	12	Advance to NFL Division 4 Final and promotion to 2024 NFL Division 3
2	Wicklow	7	4	2	1	113	101	+12	10	Advance to NFL Division 4 Final and promotion to 2024 NFL Division 3
3	Laois	7	5	0	2	135	101	+34	10	
4	Wexford	7	3	2	2	120	111	+9	8	
5	Leitrim	7	4	0	3	140	112	+28	8	
6	Carlow	7	2	1	4	94	118	−24	5	
7	Waterford	7	1	0	6	73	124	−51	2	
8	London	7	0	1	6	82	117	−35	1	

Source: GAA
Rules for classification: Tiebreakers

=== Matches ===
==== Round 1 ====
28 January 2023 Round 1	Carlow	2-10 (16) – (16) 2-10	Wicklow	Carlow
				Venue: Dr Cullen Park
	Gls: J Morrissey 1, R Dunphy 1. Pts: D Foley 5 (3fs), S O Neill 2 (2fs), J Morrissey 1, J Clarke 1, C Crowley 1.	Report	Gls: E Murtagh 1, P O’Toole 1. Pts: E Darcy 4 (4fs), M Jackson 3 (3fs), T Kelly 1, A Maher 1, K Quinn 1.	Referee: F Pierce (Kildare)

28 January 2023 Round 1	Wexford	1-09 (12) – (12) 1-09	London	Wexford
				Venue: Wexford Park
	Gls: S Dornan 1 (og). Pts: M Rossiter 3 (2f), S Nolan 3, G Malone 1, C Hughes 1, E Nolan 1.	Report	Gls: M Walsh 1. Pts: C Farley 4 (4fs), L Gavaghan 3 (3fs), M Walsh 1, H Walsh 1. OG 1-0	Referee: John Ryan (Cork); Attendance: 3,497

29 January 2023 Round 1	Leitrim	3-18 (27) – (11) 0-11	Waterford	Carrick On Shannon
				Venue: Páirc Seán Mac Diarmada
	Gls: K Beirne 1, J Heslin 1, T Prior 1. Pts: K Beirne 10 (6f, 1 45, 1M)) D Rooney 3, P Keaney 2, J Heslin 1, P Dolan 1, A Flynn 1	Report	Pts: B Lynch 4 (4f), C Murray 3, M Curry 2, D Corcoran 1, D Ryan 1.	Referee: E McFeely (Donegal)

29 January 2023 Round 1	Sligo	0-11 (11) – (17) 2-11	Laois	Sligo
				Venue: Markievicz Park
	Pts: S Carrabine 4 (3f), P O'Connor 2, N Murphy 2 (1f), C Lally 1, D Quinn 1, D Cummins 1.	Report	Gls: E Lowry 1, L Walker 1. Pts: P Kingston 6 (2f); E O'Carroll 2 (1 'mark', 1f), E Lowry 1, N Corbet 1 (1f), M Barry 1.	Referee: Kieran Eannetta (Tyrone)

==== Round 2 ====
4 February 2023 Round 2	Waterford	0-10 (10) – (14) 1-11	Carlow	Waterford
15:30 IST (UTC)				Venue: Carriganore Complex
	Pts: B Lynch 8 (7fs), D Ryan 1 (f), C Murray 1.	Report	Gls: N Hickey 1. Pts: D Foley 6 (6fs), N Hickey 1, J Morrissey 1, R Dunphy 1, C Crowley 1, S O'Neill 1 (f).	Referee: David Murnane (Cork)

5 February 2023 Round 2	London	1-15 (18) – (21) 3-12	Leitrim	Ruislip
13:00 IST (UTC)				Venue: McGovern Park
	Gls: D Clarke 1 Pts: C Farley 6 (5f, 1’45), L Gavaghan 4 (1f), J Gallagher 2, K McCarthy 2, C Duggan 1 (1m).	Report	Gls: K Beirne 1, D Wrynn 1, T Prior 1. Pts: K Beirne 7 (4f), J Reynolds 2, E Sweeney 2 (1m), J Heslin 1.	Referee: J Hayes (Limerick)

5 February 2023 Round 2	Wicklow	0-12 (12) – (18) 0-18	Sligo	Aughrim
14:00 IST (UTC)				Venue: Echelon Park
	Pts: K Quinn 3, M Kenny 3, E Darcy 2, M Jackson 2, A Maher 2.	Report	Pts: S Carrabine 4, N Murphy 4, P O’Connor 3, P Spillane 2, L Towey 1, D Cummins 1, A Reilly 1, D Quinn 1, M Gordon 1.	Referee: S Lonergan

5 February 2023 Round 2	Laois	1-18 (21) – (16) 1-13	Wexford	Portlaoise
14:00 IST (UTC)				Venue: MW Hire O'Moore Park
	Gls: E O'Carroll 1. Pts: M Barry 6 (3f), P Kingston 6 (4f), E O'Carroll 4 (1f, 1m), K Lillis 1, E Lowry 1.	Report	Gls: C Kinsella 1. Pts: M Rossiter 10, (7f, 2, '45s), G Malone 1, S Nolan 1, K O'Grady 1.	Referee: C Maguire (Clare)

==== Round 3 ====
18 February 2023 Round 3	Wicklow	1-16 (19) – (12) 1-09	London	Aughrim
				Venue: Echelon Park
	Gls: K Quinn 1. Pts: E Darcy 6 (2f), K Quinn 3 (1f), M Jackson 2 (f), D Dealy 2, P O’Toole 1, M Kenny 1, C McDonald 1.	Report	Gls: C Farley 1 (pen), Pts: J McGill 3 (2f), C Farley 2 (1f), S Dornan 2, E Lynn 1, J Gallagher 1.	Referee: B Tiernan (Dublin)

19 February 2023 Round 3	Sligo	0-21 (21) – (13) 0-13	Waterford	Sligo
				Venue: Markievicz Park
	Pts: S Carrabine 8 (6f); P O'Connor 2, N Murphy 2, N Mullen 1, L Towey 1, P Spillane 1, C Lally 1, D Quinn 1, G O'Kelly-Lynch 1, J Lavin 1, A Reilly 1, D Conlon 1.	Report	Pts: D Ryan 5; C Murray 3; B Lynch 2 (2f); D Fitzgerald 1, J Curry 1, J Devine 1.	Referee: E McFeely (Donegal)

19 February 2023 Round 3	Carlow	2-08 (14) – (20) 1-17	Laois	Carlow
				Venue: Netwatch Cullen Park
	Gls: E Molloy 1, C Hulton 1. Pts: D Foley 5 (3fs), R Dunphy 1, N Hickey 1, S O’Neill 1 (f).	Report	Gls: P Kingston 1. Pts: P Kingston 10 (7fs); E O’Carroll 3; B Byrne 2, M Barry 2 (2fs).	Referee: J Hayes (Limerick)

19 February 2023 Round 3	Wexford	0-19 (19) – (15) 0-15	Leitrim	Wexford
				Venue: Chadwicks Wexford Park
	Pts: M Rossiter 8 (5f, 1 mark), D Brooks 4 (4f), N Hughes 1, B Brosnan 1 (m), K O'Grady 1, C Hughes 1, L Coeman 1, B Molloy 1, S Nolan 1.	Report	Pts: K Beirne 11 (4f), E Sweeny 2, T Prior 1, P Dolan 1.	Referee: F Pierce (Offaly)

==== Round 4 ====
25 February 2023 Round 4	Laois	2-10 (16) – (18) 2-12	Wicklow	Portlaoise
				Venue: MW Hire O'Moore Park
	Gls: M Barry 2 (pens). Pts: M Barry 3 (3f), P Kingston 3 (2f), E Lowry 2, K Lillis 1, K Swayne 1.	Report	Gls: J Kirwan 1, JP Hurley 1. Pts: K Quinn 3 (1f), M Jackson 2 (2f), E Darcy 2 (2f), M Kenny 2 (1f), D Healy 2, P O’Keane 1.	Referee: Paddy Neilan (Roscommon)

25 February 2023 Round 4	Waterford	1-06 (9) – (18) 2-12	Wexford	Waterford
				Venue: SETU Complex
	Gls: D Corcoran 1. Pts: J Curry 3, B Lynch 1, C Murray 1, J Devine 1.	Report	Gls: B Molloy 1, MRossiter 1. Pts: E Nolan 3, M Rossiter 3, D Brooks 1, G Malone 1, D Furlong 1, S Nolan 1, J Tubritt 1, C Kinsella 1.	Referee: A Nolan (Wicklow)

26 February 2023 Round 4	London	0-06 (6) – (13) 1-10	Sligo	Ruislip
				Venue: McGovern Park
	Pts: C Farley 3 (3fs); D Clarke 1, A McLoughlin 1, K McCarthy 1.	Report	Gls: P O'Connor 1 (pen). Pts: N Murphy 4 (2fs); D Quinn 3 (1f), L Towey 1, P Spillane 1, A Reilly 1.	Referee: Fergal Kelly (Longford)

26 February 2023 Round 4	Leitrim	2-22 (28) – (13) 0-13	Carlow	Carrick-on-Shannon
				Venue: Páirc Seán Mac Diarmada
	Gls: J Heslin 1, K Beirne 1. Pts: K Beirne 10 (7fs), J Heslin 3, M Plunkett 2, E Sweeney 2, B McNulty 1, E Mulligan 1, D Rooney 1, T Prior 1, P Keaney 1.	Report	Pts: D Foley 10 (9fs), R Dunphy 2, J Morrissey 1.	Referee: N McKenna (Monaghan)

==== Round 5 ====
4 March 2023 Round 5	Laois	2-13 (19) – (8) 1-05	Waterford	Portlaoise
				Venue: MW Hire O'Moore Park
	Gls: E Lowry 2. Pts: E Lowry 6 (2m), M Barry 5 (3f), P Kingston 2 (1f).	Report	Gls: J Curry 1 (pen). Pts: D Ryan 4, J Curry 1.	Referee: T Murphy (Galway)

6 March 2023 Round 5	London	0-09 (9) – (13) 0-13	Carlow	Ruislip
				Venue: McGovern Park
	Pts: J Gallagher 4 (1f); J McGill 2 (1f); E Walsh 2, A McLoughlin 1.	Report	Pts: D Foley 7 (1m, 4f), J Morrissey 3, R Dunphy 2, C Hulton 1.	Referee: C Maguire (Clare)

6 March 2023 Round 5	Wicklow	0-15 (15) – (12) 1-09	Leitrim	Aughrim
				Venue: Echelon Park
	Pts: E Darcy 6 (5f), D Healy 3, M Jackson 3 (3f), M Kenny 2, P O'Toole 1.	Report	Gls: K Beirne 1. Pts: K Beirne 4 (3f), J Heslin 2, D Rooney 1, P Keaney 1, M Plunket 1.	Referee: S Lafferty (Antrim)

6 March 2023 Round 5	Sligo	1-20 (23) – (17) 3-08	Wexford	Sligo
				Venue: Markievicz Park
	Gls: P Spillane 1. Pts: S Carrabine 7 (4f, 1 'mark'), N Murphy 4 (1f), P Kilcoyne 2, M Walsh 2, P Spillane 1, L Towey 1, P McNamara 1, A Reilly 1, D Quinn 1 (1f)	Report	Gls: C Hughes 1, N Hughes 1, J Tubritt 1. Pts: M Rossiter 4 (4f), J Tubritt 2, P Hughes 1, G Malone 1.	Referee: J Hayes (Limerick)

==== Round 6 ====
18 March 2023 Round 6	Carlow	0-11 (11) – (16) 2-10	Sligo	Carlow
				Venue: Netwatch Cullen Park
	Pts: Darragh Foley 6 (5fs), Ross Dunphy 1, C Hulton 1, J Clarke 1, C Doyle 1, E Molloy 1.	Report	Gls: S Carrabine 1, N Murphy 1. Pts: S Carrabine 4 (2fs), P Spillane 3, F Cawley 2, N Murphy 1 (f).	Referee: Barry Tiernan (Dublin)

18 March 2023 Round 6	Waterford	2-09 (15) – (11) 2-05	London	Lemybrien
				Venue: Pairc Naomh Brid
	Gls: S Whelan Barrett 1, D Corcoran 1. Pts: B Lynch 2, J Curry 2 (1f), C Ó Cuirrín 1, J O'Sullivan 1, C Murray 1, S Whelan Barrett 1, D Fitzgerald 1.	Report	Gls: C Farley 2 (2 pen). Pts: C Farley 3 (2fs), L Gallagher 1, N O'Leary 1.	Referee: S Mulhare (Laois)

18 March 2023 Round 6	Wexford	0-19 (19) – (19) 2-13	Wicklow	Wexford
				Venue: Chadwicks Wexford Park
	Pts: B Brosnan 5 (3f), C Hughes 3, S Nolan 2, R Brooks 2, M Rossiter 2 (1m, 1f), E Nolan 2 (1f) B Molloy 1, N Hughes 1, K O'Grady 1.	Report	Gls: D Healy 2 (pen). Pts: E Darcy 6 (6f), D Healy 3, M Kenny 2, C O'Sullivan 1 (f), C McDonald 1.	Referee: Brendan Cawley (Kildare)

19 March 2023 Round 6	Leitrim	2-14 (20) – (18) 0-18	Laois	Carrick-on-Shannon
14:00 IST (UTC+1)				Venue: Páirc Seán Mac Diarmada
	Gls: K Beirne 1, P Dolan 1 Pts: K Beirne 7 (5fs, 1m, 1'45'), M Plunkett 2, S Quinn 1, D Wrynn 1, A Flynn 1, E Sweeney 1.	Report	Pts: P Kingston 8 (6fs), M Barry 5 (3fs), E Lowry 2, S O'Flynn 1, B Byrne 1, E O'Carroll 1,	Referee: Noel Mooney (Cavan)

==== Round 7 ====
25 March 2023 Round 7	Wexford	1-16 (19) – (13) 0-13	Carlow	Wexford
				Venue: Chadwicks Wexford Park
	Gls: E Nolan 1, Pts: B Brosnan 5 (5f), M Rossiter 4 (1f), S Nolan 3, P Hughes 1, R Waters 1, R Brooks 1, J Tubritt 1.	Report	Pts: D Foley 8 (7f), R Dunphy 2, M Bambrick 1, J Clarke 1, C Hulton 1.	Referee: S Lonergan (Tipperary)

26 March 2023 Round 7	London	2-08 (14) – (24) 6-06	Laois	Ruislip
				Venue: McGovern Park
	Gls: L Gallagher 1, D Clarke 1. Pts: J Gallagher 4 (1f), C Duggan 1, R McCarthy 1, C Farley 1 (1f), R Tohill 1.	Report	Gls: E O'Carroll 1, M Barry 1, P Kirwan 1, B Daly 1, E Lowry 1, B Byrne 1. Pts: E O’Carroll 3, M Barry 2, P Kirwan 1.	Referee: K Eannetta (Tyrone)

26 March 2023 Round 7	Waterford	0-08 (8) – (14) 2-08	Wicklow	Dungarvan
				Venue: Fraher Field
	Pts: J Curry 3 (3fs), C Murray 2, D Ryan 2, B Lynch 1.	Report	Gls: D Healy 1, C McDonald 1. Pts: C O'Sullivan 4 (3fs, 1 mark), M Jackson 2 (2fs), D Healy 1, P O'Toole 1.	Referee: F Pierce (Offaly)

26 March 2023 Round 7	Leitrim	2-11 (17) – (18) 1-15	Sligo	Carrick-on-Shannon
				Venue: Avant Money Páirc Seán MacDiarmada
	Gls: A Flynn 1, B McNulty 1. Pts: K Beirne 3 (2f), D Rooney 3, D Wrynn 2 (1 ‘mark’), E Sweeney 1, T Prior 1, B McNulty 1.	Report	Gls: P Spillane 1. Pts: P O’Connor 4 (1f), S Carrabine 3 (1f, 1 ‘45’), F Cawley 2, P Spillane 2, P Kilcoyne 1, C Lally 1, L Towey 1, N Murphy 1 (1f).	Referee: Martin McNally (Monaghan)

=== Final ===
TG4

1 April 2023
17:00 IST (UTC+1)

Report

Sligo	2-10 (16) – (14) 0-14	Wicklow
(HT: 1-03 - 0-08)
Gls: N Murphy 1, P Kilcoyne 1. Pts: N Murphy 4 (1f 1m), S Carrabine 2 (1f), C Lally 1, L Towey 1, P Spillane 1, N Mullen 1.		Pts: K Quinn 5 (3f), M Jackson 3 (1f 2'45), E Dary 2 (2f), M Kenny 1, JP Hurley 1, D Healy 1, C O'Sullivan 1 (1f).

Croke Park, Dublin
Referee: Paul Faloon (Down)

=== Top scorers ===
Overall

Rank	Player	Team	Tally	Total	Matches	Average
1	Keith Beirne	Leitrim	5-52	67	7	9.57
2	Darragh Foley	Carlow	0-47	47	7	6.71
3	Paul Kingston	Laois	1-35	38	7	5.42
4	Mark Rossiter	Wexford	1-34	37	7	5.28
5	Seán Carrabine	Sligo	1-32	35	8	4.37
6	Mark Barry	Laois	3-24	33	7	4.71
7	Chris Farley	London	3-19	28	7	4.00
7	Niall Murphy	Sligo	2-22	28	8	3.75
7	Eoin Darcy	Wicklow	0-28	28	8	3.75
10	Eoin Lowry	Laois	3-13	22	7	3.14

In a single game

Rank	Player	Team	Tally	Total	Opposition
1	Keith Beirne	Leitrim	1-10	13	Waterford
1	Keith Beirne	Leitrim	1-10	13	Carlow
1	Paul Kingston	Laois	1-10	13	Carlow
4	Eoin Lowry	Laois	2-06	12	Waterford
5	Keith Beirne	Leitrim	0-11	11	Wexford
6	Keith Beirne	Leitrim	1-07	10	Laois
6	Keith Beirne	Leitrim	1-07	10	London
6	Mark Rossiter	Wexford	0-10	10	Laois
6	Darragh Foley	Carlow	0-10	10	Leitrim
10	Mark Barry	Laois	2-03	9	Wicklow
10	Chris Farley	London	2-03	9	Waterford
10	Dean Healy	Wicklow	2-03	9	Wexford
