= Thomas McGrath =

Thomas McGrath or Tom McGrath may refer to:

== Arts and entertainment ==
- Tom McGrath (producer) (died 1985), Irish television producer
- Thomas McGrath (poet) (1916–1990), American poet
- Tom McGrath (playwright) (1940–2009), Scottish playwright and musician
- Tom McGrath (media executive) (born 1956), American entertainment executive
- Tom McGrath (animator) (born 1964), American animation director
- Tom McGrath (artist) (born 1978), American painter

== Sports ==
- Tom McGrath (Clare hurler) (1888–1977), Irish hurler
- Tom McGrath (Limerick hurler) (1891–1958), Irish hurler
- Tom McGrath (rugby league) (1898–1976), Australian rugby player
- Tom McGrath (runner) (born 1950), Irish-American runner

== Others ==
- Thomas H. McGrath (1840–1922), American National Guard officer
- Thomas McGrath (Wisconsin politician) (1859–1920), American politician in Wisconsin
- Thomas McGrath (builder) (1896–1988), Northern Irish builder
- Thomas McGrath (Irish Republican) (1903–1923), soldier in the IRA
- Thomas C. McGrath Jr. (1927–1994), U.S. Representative from New Jersey
