= 2019 Fermanagh Senior Football Championship =

2019 GAA Football Club Championship

2019 Fermanagh SFC
Tournament details
- County: Fermanagh
- Province: Ulster
- Level: Senior
- Year: 2019
- Trophy: New York Cup
- Sponsor: Quinn Building Products
- Date: 9 August - 22 September 2019
- Teams: 8
- Defending champions: Derrygonnelly Harps

Winners
- Champions: Derrygonnelly Harps (8th win)
- Manager: Sean Flanagan
- Captain: Ryan Jones
- Qualify for: 2019 Ulster Club SFC

Runners-up
- Runners-up: Roslea Shamrocks
- Manager: Peter McGinnity
- Captain: Seán Quigley

Promotion/Relegation
- Relegated team(s): Devenish St Mary's

The 2019 Fermanagh Senior Football Championship was the 113th edition of the Fermanagh GAA's premier club Gaelic football tournament for senior clubs in County Fermanagh, Northern Ireland. The tournament consists of eight teams, with the winner representing Fermanagh in the Ulster Senior Club Football Championship. The championship had a straight knock-out format.

Derrygonnelly Harps were the four-time defending champions after defeating Ederney St Joseph's in the previous years final.

Derrygonnelly successfully completed their five-in-a-row by beating Roslea Shamrocks by 0-10 to 1-3 in the final.

== Team changes ==
The following teams have changed division since the 2018 championship season.

=== To Championship ===
Promoted from 2019 Intermediate Championship

- Belnaleck Art McMurroughs - (Intermediate Champions)

=== From Championship ===
Relegated to 2019 Intermediate Championship

- Belcoo O'Rahillys - (Relegation Play-off Losers)

== Bracket ==
Quarter-finals
Devenish St Mary's	0-6
Derrygonnelly Harps	0-13
Belnaleck Art McMurroughs	2-7
Ederney St Joseph's	0-12
Erne Gaels	0-7
Roslea Shamrocks	1-7
Tempo Maguires	1-12
Teemore Shamrocks	0-10

Semi-finals
Derrygonnelly Harps	0-8; 0-12 (R)
Belnaleck Art McMurroughs	0-8; 1-5 (R)
Roslea Shamrocks	0-9; 2-9 (R)
Tempo Maguires	1-6; 1-6 (R)

Final
Derrygonnelly Harps	0-10
Roslea Shamrocks	1-3

== Quarter-finals ==
9 August 2019 Quarter-final	Devenish St Mary's	0-6 – 0-13	Derrygonnelly Harps	Enniskillen
19:00				Stadium: Brewster Park; Referee: Oliver McShea

9 August 2019 Quarter-final	Tempo Maguires	1-12 – 0-10	Teemore Shamrocks	Enniskillen
20:30				Stadium: Brewster Park; Referee: Gerard Gallagher

10 August 2019 Quarter-final	Belnaleck Art McMurroughs	2-7 – 0-12	Ederney St Joseph's	Enniskillen
20:00		Report		Stadium: Brewster Park; Referee: Dermott Love

11 August 2019 Quarter-final	Erne Gaels Belleek	0-7 – 1-7	Roslea Shamrocks	Ederney
18:30				Stadium: St Joseph's Park; Referee: Eugene McDonagh

== Semi-finals ==
23 August 2019 Semi-final	Tempo Maguires	1-6 – 0-9	Roslea Shamrocks	Enniskillen
20:00		Report		Stadium: Brewster Park; Referee: James Lewis

24 August 2019 Semi-final	Belnaleck Art McMurroughs	0-8 – 0-8	Derrygonnelly Harps	Enniskillen
19:00		Report		Stadium: Brewster Park; Referee: Niall Cullen

31 August 2019 Semi-final replay	Roslea Shamrocks	2-12 – 0-9	Tempo Maguires	Enniskillen
17:00		Report		Stadium: Brewster Park; Referee: Gerard McLaughlin

31 August 2019 Semi-final replay	Derrygonnelly Harps	2-9 – 1-6	Belnaleck Art McMurroughs	Enniskillen
19:00				Stadium: Brewster Park; Referee: Ferghal Cleary

== Final ==
21 September 2019
14:30
Final

Derrygonnelly Harps	0-10 – 1-3	Roslea Shamrocks
Garvan Jones 0-3 (0-2f), Conall Jones 0-3 (0-1f), Garvan McGinley 0-1, Shane McGullion 0-1, Kevin Cassidy 0-1, Aidan McKenna 0-1	Report	Niall Cosgrove 1-0, Sean Quigley 0-1 (0-1f), Brendan Sherlock 0-1, John Connolly 0-1

Brewster Park, Enniskillen
Attendance: 2,327
Referee: Dermott Love

== Relegation playoffs ==
The four losers of the quarter-finals playoff in this round. The two losers will face off in a relegation final, with the loser to be relegated to the 2020 Intermediate Football Championship.

=== Relegation semi-finals ===
24 August 2019 Relegation semi-final	Teemore Shamrocks	0-12 – 2-12	Ederney St Joseph's	Enniskillen
17:30				Stadium: Brewster Park; Referee: Oliver McShea

25 August 2019 Relegation semi-final	Erne Gaels Belleek	0-19 – 1-15	Devenish St Mary's	Derrygonnelly
13:30				Stadium: Canon Maguire Park; Referee: Barry Monaghan

=== Relegation final ===
8 September 2019 Relegation Final	Teemore Shamrocks	2-14 – 0-13	Devenish St Mary's	Derrygonnelly
15:30				Stadium: Canon Maguire Park; Referee: Nigel Sweeney
