= Martin McGrath (Gaelic footballer) =

Fermanagh Gaelic footballer

Personal information
- Native name: Máirtín Mac Craith (Irish)
- Nickname: Marty
- Born: 1981 (age 44–45) County Fermanagh, Northern Ireland
- Height: 6 ft 1 in (185 cm)

Sport
- Sport: Gaelic football
- Position: Midfield
Club
- Years: Club
- 1995–: Ederney St Joseph's
Club titles
- Fermanagh titles: 1
College
- Years: College
- Queen's University Belfast
College titles
- Sigerson titles: 0
Inter-county
- Years: County
- 1999–2013: Fermanagh
Inter-county titles
- Ulster titles: 0
- All Stars: 1

Martin McGrath is a Gaelic footballer who plays for the Ederney St Joseph's club and was a member of the Fermanagh county team from 1999 to 2013.

== Playing career ==
McGrath made his debut for the Ederney senior team in 1995, aged just fourteen.

On St Patrick's Day 1999, McGrath played in midfield for St Michael's College, Enniskillen in the MacRory Cup final against St Colman's College, Newry, scoring a point in the 4-11 to 0-12 win.

McGrath made his Fermanagh debut under Pat King in the winter of 1999, and was a substitute on the team that won the All-Ireland B title in 2000.

McGrath captained Queen's University Belfast to two consecutive Sigerson Cup finals in 2004 and 2005, but lost on both occasions to IT Sligo.

McGrath's career highlight was the All Star he received in 2004. He also won a senior and intermediate championship with his club and a Railway Cup with Ulster. He received four Ulster Personality of the Month awards, as well as the 2004 and 2008 Irish News Ulster GAA Personality of the Year. He also played as Fermanagh narrowly failed to beat Armagh in the 2008 Ulster Senior Football Championship final and represented Ireland against Australia twice in the International Rules Series.

McGrath has fought through serious many injuries during his career. In 2007, he fractured his skull when he was involved in a collision with a JCB. In 2008, he was diagnosed with testicular cancer, yet delayed his surgery until Fermanagh were knocked out of that year's championship.

McGrath announced his retirement from inter-county football on 10 October 2013.

McGrath won his first top flight final, with his club sealing the Fermanagh Division 1 final in 2013. followed by his first Fermanagh Senior Football Championship in 2020; he was not captain in either game but did field and won man of the match in the 2020 final at the age of 39.

McGrath is primarily a midfielder but is also known to play full forward for his club. He is noted for his fielding ability and surging runs from deep.

== Honours ==
Fermanagh

- All-Ireland Senior B Football Championship (1): 2000

Ederney St Joseph's

- Fermanagh Senior Football Championship (1): 2020
- Fermanagh Division 1 League (1): 2013
- Fermanagh Intermediate Football Championship (1): 2005

St Michael's College

- MacRory Cup (1): 1999

Individual

- All Star Award (1): 2004
- Irish News Ulster Footballer of the Year (2): 2004, 2008
- Irish News Ulster All-Star (2): 2004, 2008

== Personal life ==
Martin is the nephew of ultra-runner Tom McGrath.
