= 2020 Fermanagh Senior Football Championship =

2020 Fermanagh SFC
Tournament details
- County: Fermanagh
- Province: Ulster
- Level: Senior
- Year: 2020
- Trophy: New York Cup
- Sponsor: Quinn Building Products
- Date: 28 August - 27 September 2020
- Teams: 8
- Defending champions: Derrygonnelly Harps

Winners
- Champions: Ederney St Joseph's (2nd win)
- Manager: Mickey Cassidy
- Captain: Declan McCusker

Runners-up
- Runners-up: Derrygonnelly Harps
- Manager: Sean Flanagan
- Captain: Ryan Jones

Promotion/Relegation
- Relegated team(s): Erne Gaels Belleek

The 2020 Fermanagh Senior Football Championship was the 114th edition of the Fermanagh GAA's premier club Gaelic football tournament for senior clubs in County Fermanagh, Northern Ireland. The tournament consists of eight teams. The championship had a straight knock-out format (the format was not changed in spite of the COVID-19 pandemic). The draw for the championship was made on 29 June 2020.

Derrygonnelly Harps were the defending champions, seeking their sixth title in a row. They were denied in the final by Ederney St Joseph's, who won their second title and their first since 1968.

Cataegory: Gaelic Football

== Team changes ==
The following teams have changed division since the 2019 championship season.

=== To Championship ===
Promoted from 2019 Intermediate Championship

- Kinawley Brian Borus - (Intermediate Champions)

=== From Championship ===
Relegated to 2020 Intermediate Championship

- Devenish St Mary's - (Relegation Play-off Losers)

== Bracket ==
Quarter-finals
Derrygonnelly Harps | 0-10
Roslea Shamrocks | 0-6
Kinawley Brian Borus | 2-8
Erne Gaels Belleek | 1-9
Ederney St Joseph's | 1-11
Belnaleck Art McMurroughs | 2-2
Tempo Maguires | 0-13
Teemore Shamrocks | 2-8

Semi-finals
Derrygonnelly Harps | 2-7
Kinawley Brian Borus | 1-2
Ederney St Joseph's | 2-16
Teemore Shamrocks | 3-7

Final
Derrygonnelly Harps | 1-6
Ederney St Joseph's | 2-8

== Quarter-finals ==
| 28 August 2020 Quarter-final | Ederney St Joseph's | 1-11 – 2-2 | Belnaleck Art McMurroughs | Enniskillen |
| 20:00 | | | | Stadium: Brewster Park; Referee: Niall Cullen |

| 29 August 2020 Quarter-final | Kinawley Brian Borus | 2-8 – 1-9 | Erne Gaels Belleek | Derrygonnelly |
| 15:00 | | | | Stadium: Canon Maguire Park; Referee: Barry Monaghan |

| 30 August 2020 Quarter-final | Tempo Maguires | 0-13 – 2-8 | Teemore Shamrocks | Kinawley |
| 16:00 | | Report | | Stadium: Patrick McManus Memorial Park; Referee: Nigel Sweeney |

| 30 August 2020 Quarter-final | Derrygonnelly Harps | 0-10 – 0-6 | Roslea Shamrocks | Enniskillen |
| 19:00 | | Report | | Stadium: Brewster Park; Referee: Dermott Love |

== Semi-finals ==
| 11 September 2020 Semi-final | Derrygonnelly Harps | 2-7 – 1-2 | Kinawley Brian Borus | Enniskillen |
| 20:00 | | Report | | Stadium: Brewster Park; Referee: James Lewis |

| 13 September 2020 Semi-final | Ederney St Joseph's | 2-16 – 3-7 | Teemore Shamrocks | Enniskillen |
| 19:00 | | | | Stadium: Brewster Park; Referee: Aidan Ferguson |

== Final ==
27 September 2020
18:00
Final

| Derrygonnelly Harps | 1-6 – 2-8 | Ederney St Joseph's |
|---|---|---|
| Micheál Glynn 1-2 (0-2f), Conall Jones 0-3 (0-3f), Stephen McGullion 0-1 (0-1m) | Report | Mark McCauley 1-1 (1-0 pen), Seán Cassidy 1-1, Chris Snow 0-2 (0-2f), Jacob Britton 0-1, Martin McGrath 0-1, Paul McCusker 0-1, Ryan Morris 0-1 |

Brewster Park, Enniskillen
Referee: Niall Cullen

== Relegation playoffs ==
The four losers of the quarter-finals playoff in this round. The two losers will playoff in the relegation final, the loser of which will be relegated to the 2021 Intermediate Football Championship.

=== Relegation semi-finals ===
| 13 September 2020 Relegation semi-final | Belnaleck Art McMurroughs | 0-5 – 0-7 | Roslea Shamrocks | Donagh |
| 12:00 | | Report | | Stadium: Louis Leonard Memorial Park; Referee: Karol Bradshaw |

| 13 September 2020 Relegation semi-final | Erne Gaels Belleek | 2-6 – 1-12 | Tempo Maguires | Derrygonnelly |
| 16:00 | | | | Stadium: Canon Maguire Park; Referee: Nigel Sweeney |

=== Relegation final ===
| 27 September 2020 Relegation Final | Belnaleck Art McMurroughs | 3-10 – 1-10 | Erne Gaels Belleek | Garrison |
| 13:00 | | | | Stadium: St Mary's Park |
