= Ederney Town Hall =

Municipal Building in Ederney, Northern Ireland

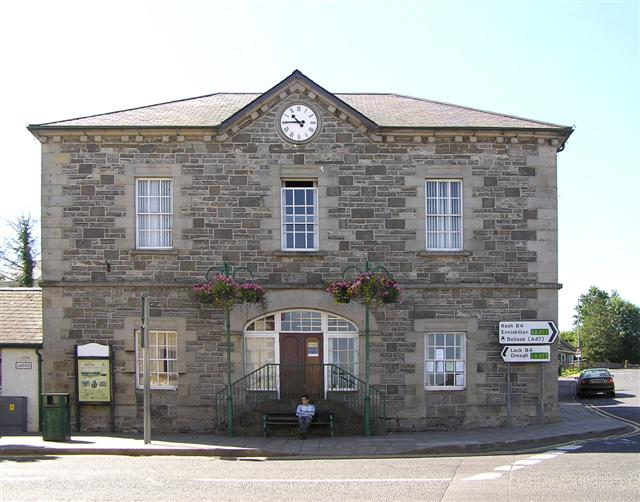
- Ederney Town Hall

- Shown in Northern Ireland
- 54.5326°N 7.6583°W
- Location: Market Street, Ederney

History
- Built: 1839

Site notes
- Architect: William Deane Butler
- Architectural style: Neoclassical style

Listed Building – Grade B1
- Official name: The Old Market House, Ederney, County Fermanagh
- Designated: 20 June 1984
- Reference no.: HB 12/14/005

Ederney Town Hall, also styled as Ederney Townhall, is a municipal structure in Market Street, Ederney, County Fermanagh, Northern Ireland. The structure, which is used as a community events venue, is a Grade B1 listed building.

== History ==
The building was commissioned by the Reverend William James West, who lived at White Park, near Brookeborough in County Fermanagh, as a market house for the local people.

The building was designed by William Deane Butler in the neoclassical style, built in coursed stone and was completed in 1839. The design involved a symmetrical main frontage with three bays facing onto Market Street; the central bay featured a wide segmental archway with an architrave and was flanked by two narrower openings with architraves, while the first floor was fenestrated by sash windows also with architraves. The central bay was surmounted by an open pediment with a clock in the tympanum. At roof level there was modillioned cornice and a hip roof. On the Ardvarney Road side, there was an archway in a similar style on the ground floor and a prominent Venetian window on the first floor. Internally the principal rooms were the market hall on the ground floor and the assembly hall on the first floor.

The arcading on the ground floor was infilled and the building was converted for use as a civic meeting place in 1889. The assembly room was used as a school room and as a venue for community events: facilities were also provided for meetings of Ederney Masonic Lodge. The building continued to be used as an events venue into the early 20th century but, by the mid 20th century, usage was falling and, by the 1970s, it was merely being used as a furniture store.

The condition of building deteriorated during the second half of the 20th century and, after an intensive local campaign to save the building, it was acquired by Fermanagh and Omagh District Council in 1989 and comprehensively restored. It subsequently became the home of the newly-established Ederney Community Development Trust, which provides and promotes a range of activities within the building.
