= Tom McGrath (artist) =

American painter (born 1978)

- Born: 1978 (age 47–48); New Milford, Connecticut, U.S.
- Education: Cooper Union (BFA); Columbia University (MFA)
- Occupation: Artist

Tom McGrath (born 1978 in New Milford, Connecticut, United States), is an American artist based in New York City, US. He received his BFA from Cooper Union in 2000 and his MFA from Columbia University in 2002.

McGrath's painterly subjects often imply a moving vantage point and a windshield-like analogy between painting, surface and picture. His imagery evokes romantic road-trip, scenic overlooks, optical blind-spots, landscapes of "fly-over" country, nocturnes of Los Angeles and urban sprawl. The work seems to be depicted from the viewpoint of a car passenger, a tourist, a commuter, or a pedestrian. His work uses contradictory painting mannerisms filtered through landscape images of both an iconic cultural origin and a generic naturalism.

His work is included in the public collections including, The Metropolitan Museum of Art, New York, The Yale Gallery of Art, New Haven, The Wadsworth Atheneum, Hartford, CT, Nerman Museum of Contemporary Art, Overland Park, KS, The Art Bank Program, U.S. Department of State, Washington D.C., The Orlando Museum of Art, Orlando, FL, The Flint Institute of Arts, Flint, MI, and The Neuberger Museum of Art, Purchase College, Purchase, NY.

He is represented by Sue Scott Gallery in New York.
