= Tom McGrath (runner) =

Ultra-runner (b. 1950)

- Born: c. 1950 (age 75–76); Ederney, County Fermanagh, Northern Ireland
- Education: St. Joseph Teacher-Training College, Belfast
- Occupations: Bar Owner, NYC – The Black Sheep. Former PE Teacher
- Known for: Ultra-running, Charity Work

Tom McGrath (born c. 1950 in Ederney, County Fermanagh, Northern Ireland.) is an Irish-American ultra-runner. He has run over 200,000 miles to raise money for charities. Due to his 1977 run across America (which he did in a then-record 53 days) and other accolades, he has been nicknamed The Irish Forrest Gump.

He played in two under-21 All-Ireland Finals in Gaelic football in 1970 and 1971; team came second both times.

== Career ==
In 1977, McGrath broke the world record for fastest crossing of the United States on foot – in 53 days and seven minutes. His record lasted for three years. For five consecutive years, he ran 1,000 miles around New York’s Central Park for charity. In May 1991, McGrath received the Jefferson award sponsored by Jacqueline Kennedy Onassis for representing New York State for Charity Services.

Since the 1990s, McGrath has owned and run The Black Sheep, a bar in midtown Manhattan. He carried the Olympic Torch as part of the 1996 Summer Olympics in Atlanta, Georgia.

In September 2016, McGrath published a memoir with author, Jared Beasley, titled The Black Sheep: The Fittest / Unfittest Bar Owner in New York.

== Selected runs ==
Below is a select list of the numerous charity and non-charity runs McGrath has completed.

McGrath's runs
Date	Run	Time / Result
December 2017	Miles for Miracles - Boston to New York Run	225 Miles, 7 Days
January 2013	Charity Cancer Run for Shane Hoey, at Van Cortlandt Park, Bronx, New York	5 Hours
December 2012	Charity Cancer Run for baby Oscar Knox, at Juniper Pk, Maspeth, Queens, New York	5 Hours
July 2012	250 Mile Solo Run for the John Barry Memorial at the United States Naval Academy, Annapolis, MD	8 Days
May 2012	500 km Charity Run for Croi, West of Ireland	10 Days
October 2011	Six Counties 300 Miles Charity Run, Northern Ireland	10 Days
June 1999	10 Hour Charity Run, Bronx, New York	10 Hours
Summer 1996	Carried Olympic Torch through New York City for Atlanta Olympics	N/A
October 1994	500 Miles - Raised $100,000 to rebuild Central Park Track	N/A
October 1992	1,000 Mile Solo Run for Memorial Sloan-Kettering Cancer Center, Dept. of Pediatrics	15 Days, 15.75 Hours
October 1991	1,000 Mile Solo Run for Memorial Sloan-Kettering Cancer Center, Dept. of Pediatrics	15 Days, 4.5 Hours
October 1990	1,000 Mile Solo Run for Memorial Sloan-Kettering Cancer Center, Dept. of Pediatrics	15 Days, 22 Hours
June 1989	1,000 Mile Solo Run for Project Children	16 Days, 21 Hours
June 1988	1,000 Mile IAU World Championship for UNICEF	3rd Place - 15 Days, 18 Hours
November 1987	New York - 5 Day Race	3rd Place - 357 Miles
November 1986	New York - 5 Day Race	4th Place - 291 Miles
January 1985	Pennsylvania - 48 Hour Race	224 Miles
November 1984	New York - 24 Hour Race	3rd Place - 130 Miles
July 1984	New York - 6 Day Race	326 Miles
July 1984	USA 100 Mile Championship	3rd Place - 14 Hours, 52 Minutes
June 1984	Kelly Games - 10 Hours	76 Miles
May 1984	Ireland - 24 Hour Race	1st Place - 126 Miles
March 1984	New York - 12 Hour Race	2nd Place - 76 Miles
December 1983	Great Irish Run for Mentally Handicapped, Solo	630 Miles, 7.5 Days
July 1981	New York Run for Charity	75 Miles
January 1978	Ireland Run for Charity	50 Miles
August 1977	New York to San Francisco - Guinness Book of Records for Fastest Time Cross Country	3,046 Miles - 53 Days, 7 Minutes - 57.1 Miles per day
