= Keith Beirne =

Leitrim Gaelic footballer

Personal information
- Born: 28 March 1997 (age 29)

Sport
- Sport: Gaelic football
- Position: Centre forward
Club
- Years: Club
- Mohill
Club titles
- titles: 5
Inter-county
- Years: County
- Leitrim

Keith Beirne (born 28 March 1997) is an Irish Gaelic footballer who plays for Mohill and at senior level for the Leitrim county team.

In an away game against Derry, Beirne scored nine points in the opening round of the 2020 National Football League (a game which ended in a draw), this after Leitrim had been promoted from Division 4 back to Division 3 for the first time in 12 years.

Beirne forced extra time with a late point against Sligo in the 2022 Tailteann Cup but Sligo ran out winners in the end. In October, he was named on the Tailteann Cup Team of the Year, the only Leitrim player represented. He has played in the US as well.

The Beirne family from Mohill won the fifth season of Ireland's Fittest Family when Keith was 20.

== Honours ==
Individual

- Tailteann Cup Team of the Year (1): 2022
