= 2018 Fermanagh Senior Football Championship =

2018 Fermanagh SFC
Tournament details
- County: Fermanagh
- Province: Ulster
- Level: Senior
- Year: 2018
- Trophy: New York Cup
- Sponsor: Quinn Building Products
- Date: 17 August - 30 September 2018
- Teams: 8
- Defending champions: Derrygonnelly Harps

Winners
- Champions: Derrygonnelly Harps (7th win)
- Manager: Sean Flanagan
- Captain: Ryan Jones
- Qualify for: 2018 Ulster Club SFC

Runners-up
- Runners-up: Ederney St Joseph's
- Manager: Mickey Cassidy
- Captain: Christopher Snow

Promotion/Relegation
- Relegated team(s): Belcoo O'Rahillys

The 2018 Fermanagh Senior Football Championship was the 112th edition of the Fermanagh GAA's premier club Gaelic football tournament for senior clubs in County Fermanagh, Northern Ireland. The tournament consists of 8 teams, with the winner representing Fermanagh in the Ulster Senior Club Football Championship. The championship had a straight knock-out format.

Derrygonnelly Harps were the three-time defending champions, having beaten Devenish St Mary's in the previous years final.

Derrygonnelly successfully defended their title to claim their fourth championship in a row by beating Ederney St Joseph's in the final.

== Team changes ==
The following teams have changed division since the 2017 championship season.

=== To Championship ===
Promoted from 2017 Intermediate Championship

- Belcoo O'Rahillys - (Intermediate Champions)

=== From Championship ===
Relegated to 2018 Intermediate Championship

- Kinawley Brian Borus - (Relegation Play-off Losers)

== Bracket ==
Quarter-finals
Ederney St Joseph's	3-15
Belcoo O'Rahillys	1-10
Tempo Maguires	1-7; 1-5 (R)
Erne Gaels Belleek	1-7; 0-13 (R)
Teemore Shamrocks	0-7
Devenish St Mary's	1-7
Roslea Shamrocks	0-6
Derrygonnelly Harps	0-12

Semi-finals
Ederney St Joseph's	3-13
Erne Gaels Belleek	3-5
Devenish St Mary's	0-9
Derrygonnelly Harps	1-13

Final
Ederney St Joseph's	0-10
Derrygonnelly Harps	2-16

== Quarter-finals ==
17 August 2018 Quarter-final	Tempo Maguires	1-7 – 1-7	Erne Gaels Belleek	Enniskillen
20:00				Stadium: Brewster Park; Referee: Dermott Love

18 August 2018 Quarter-final	Teemore Shamrocks	1-9 – 0-13	Devenish St Mary's	Derrygonnelly
18:45				Stadium: Canon Maguire Park; Referee: Oliver McShea

19 August 2018 Quarter-final	Ederney St Joseph's	3-15 – 1-10	Belcoo O'Rahillys	Kinawley
18:30				Stadium: Patrick McManus Park; Referee: Karol Bradshaw

25 August 2018 Quarter-final	Roslea Shamrocks	0-6 – 0-12	Derrygonnelly Harps	Enniskillen
19:30				Stadium: Brewster Park; Referee: Niall Cullen

1 September 2018 Quarter-final replay	Erne Gaels Belleek	0-13 – 1-5	Tempo Maguires	Kinawley
18:30				Stadium: Patrick McManus Park; Referee: James Lewis

== Semi-finals ==
7 September 2018 Semi-final	Devenish St Mary's	0-9 – 1-13	Derrygonnelly Harps	Enniskillen
20:00				Stadium: Brewster Park; Referee: Karol Bradshaw

8 September 2018 Semi-final	Ederney St Joseph's	3-13 – 3-5	Erne Gaels Belleek	Enniskillen
20:00				Stadium: Brewster Park; Referee: Oliver McShea

== Final ==
30 September 2018
16:00
Final

Ederney St Joseph's	0-10 – 2-16	Derrygonnelly Harps
Mark McCauley 0-4 (0-4f), Martin McGrath 0-2, Aaron Dennison 0-2, Conor McGee 0-1, Christopher Snow 0-1	Report	Paul Ward 1-3, Garvan Jones 0-5 (0-3f), Ryan Jones 1-2, Conall Jones 0-3 (0-1f), Gary McKenna 0-1 (0-1f), Neil Gallagher 0-1

Brewster Park, Enniskillen
Referee: James Lewis

== Relegation Playoffs ==
The four losers of the quarter-finals playoff in this round. The two losers will face off in a relegation final, with the loser to be relegated to the 2019 Intermediate Championship.

=== Relegation semi-finals ===
8 September 2018 Relegation semi-final	Tempo Maguires	1-12 – 0-12	Teemore Shamrocks	Derrygonnelly
15:00				Stadium: Canon Maguire Park; Referee: Barry Monaghan

9 September 2018 Relegation semi-final	Roslea Shamrocks	2-9 – 1-9	Belcoo O'Rahillys	Tempo
16:30				Stadium: St. Patrick's Park; Referee: Kevin Donnelly

=== Relegation final ===
22 September 2018 Relegation Final	Teemore Shamrocks	1-13 – 2-8	Belcoo O'Rahillys	Derrylin
16:30				Stadium: O'Connell Park; Referee: Aidan Ferguson
