= Ederney =

Coordinates: 54.5326°N 7.6586°W

Ederney: Irish: Eadarnaidh
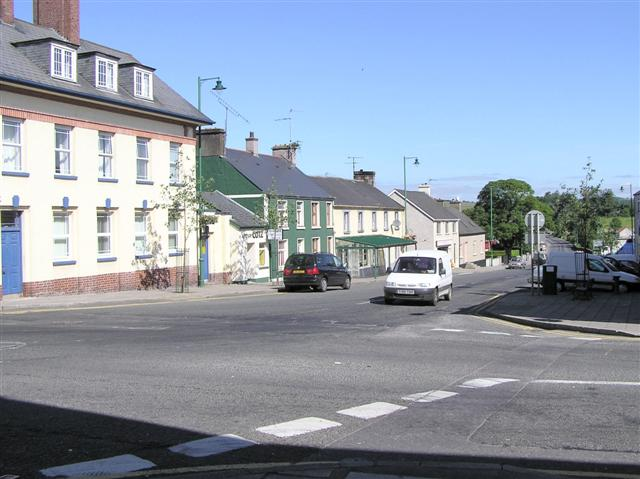
- Road junction in Ederney

- Location within Northern Ireland
- Population: 553 (2021 Census)
- Irish grid reference: H221649
  - Belfast: 83 miles
- District: Fermanagh and Omagh
- County: County Fermanagh
- Country: Northern Ireland
- Sovereign state: United Kingdom
- Post town: ENNISKILLEN
- Postcode district: BT93
- Dialling code: 02868
- UK Parliament: Fermanagh and South Tyrone
- NI Assembly: Fermanagh and South Tyrone

Ederney (from Irish Eadarnaidh, meaning 'middle place/place between') is a village situated primarily in the townlands of Drumkeen and of Ederny in County Fermanagh, Northern Ireland.

At the 2021 census it had a population of 553. Ederney lies in the Glendarragh River Valley near Lower Lough Erne and Kesh. It is 83 miles (134 km) from Belfast, over 100 miles (160 km) from Dublin and about 16 miles from both Omagh and Enniskillen. The village and its hinterland (the Glendarragh Valley area) has a population of several thousand.

Ederney is located on a tourist route adjacent to Lough Erne. It is approximately 7 miles (11 km) from the border with the Republic of Ireland and 24 miles (39 km) from the west of Ireland tourism trail, the Wild Atlantic Way, in County Donegal.

== Public transport ==
Ulsterbus route 194 serves Ederney with one daily journey in each direction except Sundays, linking it to Irvinestown, Enniskillen and Pettigo. Route 83A provides a link to Omagh on Mondays & Thursdays only.

== History ==
Local historian Leo Mulligan, MBE, details that at the time of the Plantation of Ulster there was a settlement of significance at Ederny, when the land grant (titled "Edernagh") was given to Captain Thomas Blennerhassett of Norfolk in 1610. He created the Manor of Edernagh on a 450 acres (1.8 km^{2}) demesne and a court baron on the shores of Lough Erne, which he later named Castle Hassett. He established the new village of Ederny (Edernagh).

By 1797, the settlement is recorded in the Topographia Hibernica as Ederny Bridge and "fair days" were held there.

== Built heritage ==
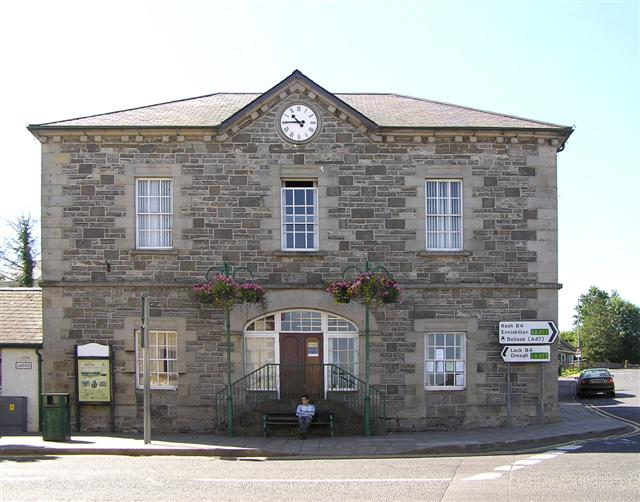
Ederney Town Hall, built circa 1839

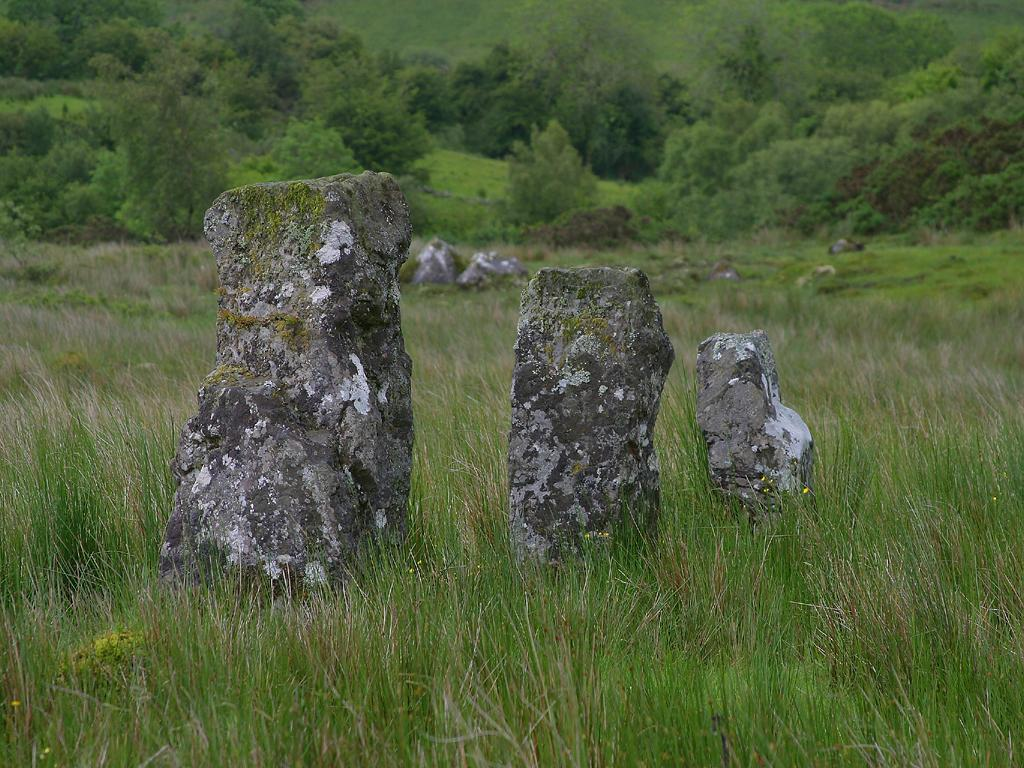
Some of the standing stones at nearby Drumskinny

One of the principal buildings in the village is Ederney Town Hall, locally styled as the "Townhall", erected in 1839. It remains in use as a village community centre.

Another local landmark is Drumskinny stone circle. Drumskinny (from Irish Droim Scine 'knife ridge') is the site of a stone circle in the nearby townland of Drumskinny. The site consists of 39 stones set in a circle. The arrangement is reportedly related to the seasons, moon and sun, and dates from the Bronze Age.

== Sport ==
The village has a Gaelic football club, Ederney St Joseph's.

== Demographics ==
As of the 2011 census, there were 587 people living in Ederney. Of these:

- 17.21% were aged under 16 years and 18.91% were aged 65 and over
- 50.6% of the population were male and 49.4% were female
- 82.11% were from a Catholic background and 15.5% were from a Protestant background

At the 2021 census, 553 people were living in Ederney. According to the 2021 census, Ederney had the highest proportion of residents who spoke Irish daily in County Fermanagh with 3.99%, which was higher than the average across Northern Ireland (of 2.43%).

== Notable people ==
- Michael Barrett (1841–1868), Fenian and last man to be publicly hanged in Britain.
- Martin McGrath (b.1981), inter county Gaelic footballer who was one only three Fermanagh players to win a GAA All Star award.

== See also ==
- Market houses in Northern Ireland
