= Ederney St Joseph's GAC =

Fermanagh-based Gaelic games club

Ederney St Joseph's
- Eadarnaigh Naomh Seosamh
- Founded: 1929
- County: Fermanagh
- Colours: White and Green
- Grounds: St Joseph's Park, Ederney
- Coordinates: 54°31′50″N 7°39′27″W

Playing kits
Standard colours

Senior Club Championships
	All Ireland	Ulster champions	Fermanagh champions
Football:	-	-	2

Ederney St Joseph's is a Gaelic football club based in the village of Ederney, County Fermanagh, Northern Ireland.

== History ==
The club was first founded in May 1929, and went through various incarnations before winning their first Fermanagh Senior Football Championship title in 1968, beating Newtownbutler by 3–7 to 2–6.

In 2004, Martin McGrath became Ederney's first All Star.

Ederney reached the county finals in both 2006 and 2018, losing heavily to Enniskillen Gaels and Derrygonnelly Harps respectively. After a fifty-two year wait the club finally added its second senior championship in 2020, beating Derrygonnelly 2–8 to 1–6 in the final.

== Notable players ==
- Martin McGrath

== Honours ==
- Fermanagh Senior Football Championship (2): 1968, 2020
- Fermanagh Intermediate Football Championship (4): 1966, 1979, 1989, 2005
- Fermanagh Junior Football Championship (4): 1939, 1951, 1969, 1973
