= 2019 Wicklow Senior Football Championship =

Wicklow S.F.C.
- Season: 2019
- Champions: St Patrick's (14th S.F.C. Title)
- Relegated: Hollywood
- Winning Captain: Stephen Duffy
- Final Man Of The Match: Conor Ffrench
- Winning Manager: Casey O'Brien

The 2019 Wicklow Senior Football Championship was the 119th edition of the Wicklow GAA's premier club Gaelic football tournament for senior graded teams in County Wicklow, Ireland. The tournament consisted of 12 teams with the winner going on to represent Wicklow in the Leinster Senior Club Football Championship. The championship consisted of a group stage before progressing onto a knock-out stage.

St Patrick's claimed their second consecutive title, defeating Arklow Geraldines Ballymoney in the final.

Tinahely made the straight bounce back to the top flight after claiming the previous season's I.F.C. title.

Hollywood were relegated to the I.F.C. for 2020 after a two year stay in the top-flight.

== Team changes ==
The following teams have changed division since the 2018 championship season.

=== To S.F.C. ===
Promoted from 2018 I.F.C.

- Tinahely - (Intermediate Champions)

=== From S.F.C. ===
Relegated to 2019 I.F.C.

- Annacurra

== Group stage ==
There are two groups of six teams called Group A and B. The top finishers enter the semi-finals while the 2nd and 3rd placed teams in both groups enter a Quarter-Final. The bottom finishers of each group will qualify for the Relegation Final.

=== Group A ===
Team	Pld	W	L	D	PF	PA	PD	Pts
Arklow Geraldines-Ballymoney	5	4	0	1	90	64	+26	8
Rathnew	5	4	0	1	88	69	+19	8
Tinahely	5	3	2	0	86	72	+14	6
Newtown	5	1	4	0	74	79	-5	2
Kiltegan	5	1	4	0	89	114	-25	2
Hollywood	5	1	4	0	61	90	-29	2

Round 1

- Tinahely 2-11, 1-8 Hollywood, 5/7/2019,
- Arklow Geraldines-Ballymoney 3-20, 3-9 Kiltegan, 7/7/2019,
- Rathnew 2-13, 2-9 Newtown, 9/7/2019,

Round 2

- Tinahely 1-16, 2-6 Newtown, 20/7/2019,
- Hollywood 2-13, 2-12 Kiltegan, 20/7/2019,
- Arklow Geraldines-Ballymoney 1-7, 0-10 Rathnew, 21/7/2019,

Round 3

- Rathnew 1-11, 1-10 Tinahely, 3/8/2019,
- Arklow Geraldines-Ballymoney 0-16, 1-9 Hollywood, 4/8/2019,
- Kiltegan 2-14, 1-13 Newtown, 4/8/2019,

Round 4:

- Tinahely 4-10, 2-7 Kiltegan, 17/8/2019,
- Arklow Geraldines-Ballymoney 1-10, 0-9 Newtown, 17/8/2019,
- Rathnew 1-14, 1-8 Hollywood, 17/8/2019,

Round 5:

- Newtown 2-16, 0-8 Hollywood, 24/8/2019,
- Arklow Geraldines-Ballymoney 2-16, 1-12 Tinahely, 24/8/2019,
- Rathnew 5-13, 1-17 Kiltegan, 24/8/2019,

=== Group B ===
Team	Pld	W	L	D	PF	PA	PD	Pts
St Patrick's	5	5	0	0	92	45	+47	10
Blessington	5	4	1	0	84	68	+16	8
Avondale	5	3	2	0	87	89	-2	6
Bray Emmets	5	2	3	0	79	93	-14	4
Baltinglass	5	1	4	0	71	86	-15	2
Éire Óg Greystones	5	0	5	0	52	84	-32	0

Round 1

- Blessington 3-11, 2-11 Bray Emmets, 7/7/2019,
- Avondale 4-13, 2-10 Baltinglass, 7/7/2019,
- St Patrick's 2-11, 1-9 Éire Óg Greystones, 7/7/2019,

Round 2

- Blessington 1-12, 0-12 Baltinglass, 20/7/2019,
- St Patrick's 1-14, 0-7 Bray Emmets, 21/7/2019,
- Avondale 2-6, 0-10 Éire Óg Greystones, 21/7/2019,

Round 3

- St Patrick's 3-14, 0-7 Avondale, 3/8/2019,
- Blessington 2-14, 1-4 Éire Óg Greystones, 4/8/2019,
- Bray Emmets 3-11, 2-7 Baltinglass, 4/8/2019,

Round 4:

- Bray Emmets 1-12, 0-14 Éire Óg Greystones, 17/8/2019,
- Blessington 3-11, 2-8 Avondale, 18/8/2019,
- St Patrick's 2-11, 1-7 Baltinglass, 18/8/2019,

Round 5:

- St Patrick's 2-12, 1-6 Blessington, 24/8/2019,
- Baltinglass 2-14, 0-9 Éire Óg Greystones, 25/8/2019,
- Avondale 5-14, 2-14 Bray Emmets, 25/8/2019.

== Keating Trophy ==
The bottom two teams in each group enter the relegation process known as the Keating Trophy. 5th place from both groups play 6th place in the semi-finals. The winners proceed to the Keating Trophy final while the losers will face-off in the Relegation Final, with the ultimate loser being relegated to the I.F.C. for 2020.

Semi-Finals:

- Baltinglass 3-14, 2-4 Hollywood, Donard, 5/9/2019,
- Eiré Óg Greystones 2-15, 1-14 Kiltegan, Arklow, 15/9/2019,

Final:

- Baltinglass 1-12, 1-9 Eiré Óg Greystones, Blessington, 29/9/2019,

== Relegation Final ==
- Kiltegan 2-10, 0-9 Hollywood, Baltinglass, 5/10/2019,

== Knock-Out Stages ==
Quarter-Finals:

- Avondale 1-15, 1-14 Rathnew, Aughrim Park, 15/9/2019, (A.E.T.),
- Blessington 1-18, 1-7 Tinahely, Aughrim Park, 15/9/2019,

Semi-Finals:

- St Patrick's 3-11, 0-12 Avondale, Aughrim Park, 28/9/2019,
- Arklow Geraldines-Ballymoney 0-20, 2-14 Blessington, Aughrim Park, 29/9/2019, (A.E.T. - 4-4pens.),
- Arklow Geraldines-Ballymoney 3-6, 1-10 Blessington, Aughrim Park, 5/10/2019, (Replay),

=== Final ===
13/10/2019; 15:30; Final	St Patrick's	0-09 -vs- 0-07	Arklow Geraldines-Ballymoney	Aughrim Park; Referee: Anthony Nolan; Man of the Match: Conor Ffrench
