= 2018 Wicklow Senior Football Championship =

Wicklow S.F.C.
- Season: 2018
- Champions: St Patrick's (13th S.F.C. Title)
- Relegated: Annacurra
- Winning Captain: Dean Healy
- Final Man Of The Match: Stephen Duffy
- Winning Manager: Casey O’Brien

The 2018 Wicklow Senior Football Championship was the 118th edition of the Wicklow GAA's premier club Gaelic football tournament for senior graded teams in County Wicklow, Ireland. The tournament consisted of 12 teams with the winner going on to represent Wicklow in the Leinster Senior Club Football Championship. The championship consisted of a group stage before progressing onto a knock-out stage.

Rathnew were the defending champions after they defeated Blessington in the previous years final.

Hollywood made the straight bounce back to the top flight after claiming the previous season's I.F.C. title.

Tomacork (an amalgamation of Intermediate club Carnew Emmets and Junior 'A' side Coolboy) were originally included in the S.F.C. draw on 19 January, however later made the decision to withdraw themselves from the competition before its commencement.

St. Patrick's claimed their 13th S.F.C. title and first in 6 seasons when defeating Rathnew in the final.

Annacurra were relegated to the I.F.C. for 2019.

== Team changes ==
The following teams have changed division since the 2017 championship season.

=== To S.F.C. ===
Promoted from 2017 Wicklow I.F.C.

- Hollywood - (Intermediate Champions)

=== From S.F.C. ===
Relegated to 2018 Wicklow I.F.C.

- Coolkenno
- Tinahely

== Group stage ==
There are two groups of six teams called Group A and B. The top finishers enter the semi-finals while the 2nd and 3rd placed teams in both groups enter a Quarter-Final. The bottom finishers of each group will qualify for the Relegation Final.

=== Group A ===
| Team | Pld | W | D | L | PF | PA | PD | Pts |
|---|---|---|---|---|---|---|---|---|
| St Patrick's | 5 | 4 | 1 | 0 | 90 | 56 | +34 | 9 |
| Arklow Geraldines-Ballymoney | 5 | 3 | 2 | 0 | 101 | 70 | +31 | 8 |
| Baltinglass | 5 | 3 | 0 | 2 | 92 | 63 | +29 | 6 |
| Blessington | 5 | 2 | 1 | 2 | 80 | 78 | +2 | 5 |
| Annacurra | 5 | 0 | 1 | 4 | 66 | 108 | -42 | 1 |
| Newtown | 5 | 0 | 1 | 4 | 56 | 110 | -54 | 1 |

Round 1

- Arklow Geraldines-Ballymoney 2-14, 0-10 Newtown, 14/7/2018,
- St Patrick's 2-6, 0-9 Baltinglass, 14/7/2018,
- Blessington 1-21, 1-11 Annacurra, 14/7/2018,

Round 2

- Baltinglass 4-17, 0-8 Newtown, 21/7/2018,
- St Patrick's 0-16, 0-9 Annacurra, 21/7/2018,
- Blessington 2-12, 1-15 Arklow Geraldines-Ballymoney, 5/8/2018,

Round 3

- Blessington 2-12, 2-6 Newtown, 28/7/2018,
- Baltinglass 3-15, 2-10 Annacurra, 5/8/2018,
- St Patrick's 1-13, 3-7 Arklow Geraldines-Ballymoney, 25/8/2018,

Round 4:

- Arklow Geraldines-Ballymoney 4-6, 1-11 Baltinglass, 11/8/2018,
- Newtown 0-15, 0-15 Annacurra, 11/8/2018,
- St Patrick's 3-9, 0-11 Blessington, 9/9/2018,

Round 5:

- Baltinglass 0-16, 1-6 Blessington, 26/8/2018,
- Arklow Geraldines-Ballymoney 4-17, 1-9 Annacurra, 7/9/2018,
- St Patrick's 3-19, 0-11 Newtown, 5/8/2018,

=== Group B ===
| Team | Pld | W | D | L | PF | PA | PD | Pts |
|---|---|---|---|---|---|---|---|---|
| Rathnew | 5 | 4 | 1 | 0 | 96 | 54 | +42 | 9 |
| Hollywood | 5 | 4 | 1 | 0 | 67 | 39 | +28 | 9 |
| Kiltegan | 5 | 2 | 1 | 2 | 74 | 70 | +4 | 5 |
| Bray Emmets | 5 | 1 | 1 | 3 | 69 | 91 | -22 | 3 |
| Avondale | 5 | 1 | 1 | 3 | 67 | 99 | -32 | 3 |
| Éire Óg Greystones | 5 | 0 | 1 | 4 | 63 | 83 | -20 | 1 |

Round 1

- Rathnew 5-11, 2-7 Avondale, 20/7/2018,
- Kiltegan 5-12, 1-11 Bray Emmets, 22/7/2018,
- Hollywood 1-14, 0-13 Éire Óg Greystones, 22/7/2018,

Round 2

- Bray Emmets 3-11, 2-11 Éire Óg Greystones, 3/8/2018,
- Rathnew 0-8, 0-8 Hollywood, 4/8/2018,
- Kiltegan 2-14, 2-9 Avondale, 5/8/2018,

Round 3

- Hollywood 1-10, 1-7 Bray Emmets, 11/8/2018,
- Avondale 2-10, 0-9 Éire Óg Greystones, 11/8/2018,
- Rathnew 6-9, 0-13 Kiltegan, 12/8/2018,

Round 4:

- Rathnew 2-13, 1-7 Bray Emmets, 25/8/2018,
- Kiltegan 1-11, 1-11 Éire Óg Greystones, 25/8/2018,
- Hollywood 3-20, 0-8 Avondale, 25/8/2018,

Round 5:

- Bray Emmets 1-12, 3-6 Avondale, 8/9/2018,
- Rathnew 0-16, 1-7 Éire Óg Greystones, 8/9/2018,
- Hollywood w/o, scr Kiltegan,

== Knock-out Stages ==
Quarter-Finals
Arklow Geraldines Ballymoney | 2-15
Kiltegan | 1-11
Baltinglass | 0-09
Hollywood | 0-10

Semi-Finals
Arklow Geraldines Ballymoney | 1-11
Rathnew | 0-15
Hollywood | 1-04
St Patrick's | 3-13

Final
Rathnew | 0-13
St Patrick's | 1-10

== Keating Trophy ==
The bottom two teams in each group enter the relegation process known as the Keating Trophy. 5th place from both groups play 6th place in the semi-finals. The winners proceed to the Keating Trophy final while the losers will face-off in the Relegation Final, with the ultimate loser being relegated to the I.F.C. for 2019.

Semi-Finals:

- Eiré Óg Greystones 1-14, 1-4 Annacurra, Bray, 14/9/2018,
- Newtown 2-9, 2-8 Avondale, Dunbar Park, 15/9/2018,

Final:

- Eiré Óg Greystones 0-15, 0-6 Newtown, Roundwood, 28/9/2018,

== Relegation Final ==
- Avondale 0-14, 0-10 Annacurra, Ballinakill, 28/9/2018,

== Knock-Out Stages ==
=== Quarter-finals ===
| 16/09/2018; 3:30PM; Quarter-Final | Arklow Geraldines Ballymoney | 2-15 - 1-11 | Kiltegan | Aughrim Park; Referee: ??? Man of the Match: Cormac O'Shea (Arklow) |

| 23/09/2018; 4:30PM; Quarter-Final | Hollywood | 0-10 - 0-9 | Hollywood | Aughrim Park; Referee: ??? |

=== Semi-finals ===
| 29/09/2018; 4:30PM; Semi-Final | Rathnew | 0-15 - 1-11 | Arklow Geraldines-Ballymoney | Aughrim Park; Referee: ??? |

| 30/09/2018; Semi-Final | St Patrick's | 3-13 - 1-4 | Hollywood | Aughrim Park; Referee: ??? |

=== Final ===
| 14/10/2018; 15:00; Final | St Patrick's | 1-10 - 0-13 | Rathnew | Aughrim Park; Referee: ??? |

=== Final replay ===
| 27/10/2018; 15:00; Final | St Patrick's | 0-10 - 0-8 | Rathnew | Aughrim Park; Referee: Declan Peppard (Hollywood) |
