= 2017 Wicklow Senior Football Championship =

Wicklow S.F.C.
- Season: 2017
- Champions: Rathnew (33rd title)
- Relegated: Coolkenno; Tinahely
- Winning Captain: Leighton Glynn
- Man Of The Match: Nicky Mernagh
- Winning Manager: Harry Murphy

The 2017 Wicklow Senior Football Championship is the 117th edition of the Wicklow GAA's premier club Gaelic football tournament for senior graded teams in County Wicklow, Ireland. The tournament consists of 13 teams with the winner going on to represent Wicklow in the Leinster Senior Club Football Championship. The championship consists of a back door system.

Baltinglass were the defending champions after they defeated St. Patrick's in the previous years final.

This was Arklow Geraldines-Ballymoney's return to the top flight after claiming last season's I.F.C. title.

== Team changes ==
The following teams have changed division since the 2016 championship season.

=== To S.F.C. ===
Promoted from 2016 Wicklow Intermediate Football Championship

- Arklow Geraldines-Ballymoney - (Intermediate Champions)

=== From S.F.C. ===
Relegated to 2017 Wicklow Intermediate Football Championship

- Aughrim
- Hollywood
- St. Boden's

=== From S.F.C. ===
Discontinued Amalgamation

- North District

== Group stage ==
There are three groups of six teams called Group A, B and C. The 3 top finishers in Group A and 2 finishers in Groups B and C qualify for the quarter-finals. The third placed team in Group B and C will play off for a place in the quarter-finals. The bottom finishers of each group will qualify for the relegation play-off.

=== Group A ===
Team	Pld	W	L	D	PF	PA	PD	Pts
Kiltegan	4	4	0	0	90	46	+44	8
Arklow Geraldines-Ballymoney	4	3	1	0	65	60	+5	6
Blessington	4	2	2	0	84	48	+36	4
Tinahely	4	1	3	0	47	86	-39	2
Bray Emmets	4	0	4	0	48	94	-46	0

Round 1

- Tinahely 2-13, 1-11 Bray Emmets, Aughrim Park, 29/6/2017 Report
- Kiltegan 2-13, 2-11 Blessington, Aughrim Park, 2/7/2017 Report
- Arklow Geraldines-Ballymoney - Bye,

Round 2

- Blessington 6-18, 1-7 Bray Emmets, Aughrim Park, 14/7/2017 Report
- Arklow Geraldines-Ballymoney 4-8, 1-10 Tinahely, Aughrim Park, 16/7/2017, Report
- Kiltegan - Bye,

Round 3

- Arklow Geraldines-Ballymoney 1-12, 1-10 Blessington, Aughrim Park, 29/7/2017,
- Kiltegan 2-14, 0-7 Bray Emmets, Aughrim Park, 30/7/2017,
- Tinahely - Bye,

Round 4

- Kiltegan 2-11, 0-11 Arklow Geraldines-Ballymoney, Aughrim Park, 12/8/2017,
- Blessington 1-15, 0-4 Tinahely, Aughrim Park, 12/8/2017,
- Bray Emmets - Bye,

Round 5

- Arklow Geraldines-Ballymoney 4-7, 2-11 Bray Emmets, Aughrim Park, 25/8/2017,
- Kiltegan 4-22, 1-8 Tinahely, Baltinglass, 27/8/2017,
- Blessington - Bye,

=== Group B ===
Team	Pld	W	L	D	PF	PA	PD	Pts
Éire Óg Greystones	3	3	0	0	56	37	+19	6
Avondale	3	1	1	1	50	51	-1	3
Annacurra	3	1	2	0	43	38	+5	2
Newtown	3	0	2	1	32	55	-23	1

Round 1

- Avondale 4-3, 1-12 Newtown, Ashford, 2/7/2017, Report
- Éire Óg Greystones 0-12, 0-11 Annacurra, Ashford, 2/7/2017,

Round 2

- Éire Óg Greystones 1-16, 2-10 Avondale, Arklow, 30/7/2017,
- Annacurra 1-12, 0-7 Newtown, Arklow, 30/7/2017,

Round 3

- Éire Óg Greystones 1-22, 0-10 Newtown, Ashford, 11/8/2017,
- Avondale 2-13, 3-8 Annacurra, Aughrim Park, 11/8/2017,

=== Group C ===
Team	Pld	W	L	D	PF	PA	PD	Pts
St Patrick's	3	2	0	1	44	25	+19	5
Baltinglass	3	1	0	2	49	40	+9	4
Rathnew	3	1	1	1	43	43	+0	3
Coolkenno	3	0	3	0	29	57	-28	0

Round 1

- Rathnew 1-13, 1-8 Coolkenno, Aughrim Park, 1/7/2017,
- Baltinglass 0-10, 0-10 St Patrick's, Aughrim Park, 2/7/2017,

Round 2

- St Patrick's 2-7, 0-8 Rathnew, Aughrim Park, 15/7/2017, Report
- Baltinglass 3-11, 1-8 Coolkenno, Aughrim Park, 30/7/2017, Report

Round 3

- St Patrick's 2-15, 1-4 Coolkenno, Aughrim Park, 4/8/2017,
- Rathnew 3-10, 4-7 Baltinglass, Aughrim Park, 13/8/2017,

== Keating Trophy/Relegation play-off ==
The five teams who failed to reach the quarter-finals enter the Keating Trophy. These teams play each other in a round robin basis. The top two finishers proceed to the Keating Trophy final while the two bottom finishers will be relegated to the 2018 I.F.C.

Team	Pld	W	L	D	PF	PA	PD	Pts
Annacurra	4	3	1	0	60	48	+12	6
Bray Emmets	4	2	1	1	50	50	+0	5
Newtown	4	2	2	0	58	58	+0	4
Tinahely	4	1	2	1	52	56	-4	3
Coolkenno	4	1	3	0	41	45	-4	2

Round 1:

- Coolkenno 0-12, 1-5 Tinahely, 16/9/2017,
- Bray Emmets 3-8, 0-12 Newtown, 19/9/2017,
- Annacurra - Bye,

Round 2:

- Tinahely 2-12, 1-11 Annacurra, 23/9/2017,
- Bray Emmets 1-11, 0-10 Coolkenno, 24/9/2017,
- Newtown - Bye,

Round 3:

- Newtown 1-13, 0-13 Coolkenno, 6/10/2017,
- Annacurra 1-14, 0-8 Bray Emmets, 8/10/2017,
- Tinahely - Bye,

Round 4:

- Annacurra 1-10, 0-11 Newtown, 4/11/2017,
- Bray Emmets 1-8, 1-8 Tinahely, 4/11/2017,
- Coolkenno - Bye,

Round 5:

- Newtown 2-13, 2-9 Tinahely, 28/10/2017,
- Annacurra 1-13, 1-8 Coolkenno, 28/10/2017,
- Bray Emmets - Bye.

Final

- Annacurra 1-16, 3-7 Bray Emmets, Arklow, 11/11/2017,

== Knock-out Stages ==
Preliminary Quarter-Finals
Rathnew	0-12 (1-19 R)
Annacurra	0-12 (1-9 R)

Quarter-Finals
Kiltegan	2-6
Rathnew	2-13
Baltinglass	0-14 (2-14 R)
Éire Óg	2-8 (1-12 R)
Blessington	1-10
St. Patrick's	1-7
Avondale	1-8
Arklow Geraldines-Ballymoney	1-7

Semi-Finals
Rathnew	1-09
Baltinglass	0-08
Blessington	2-14
Avondale	2-5

Final
Rathnew	3-8
Blessington	0-12

== Quarter-Final play-off ==
8/26/17; Quarter-Final	Rathnew	0-12 - 0-12	Annacurra	Aughrim Park; Referee: Ciaran Fleming (Baltinglass)
8/26/17; Quarter-Final	Leighton Glynn 0-5, Eddie Doyle 0-4 (0-3f), David Jameson, Theo Smyth, Jody Merrigan 0-1 each	Report	Gearoid Murphy 0-7 (0-4f, 1 '45), Frank Clune 0-2, Martin O'Brien, Clive Horan (0-1f), Shane O'Keeffe 0-1 each	Aughrim Park; Referee: Ciaran Fleming (Baltinglass)

9/2/17; Quarter-Final Replay	Rathnew	1-19 - 1-9	Annacurra	Aughrim Park; Referee: Noel Kinsella (Kilbride)
9/2/17; Quarter-Final Replay	Leighton Glynn 1-3, Eddie Doyle 0-6 (0-2f), Jody Merrigan 0-5, Mark Doyle 0-3, Ross O'Brien and Nicky Mernagh 0-1 each		Gearoid Murphy 0-4, Clive Horan 0-3, Shane O'Keeffe 1-0, Frank Clune 0-2	Aughrim Park; Referee: Noel Kinsella (Kilbride)

== Quarter-finals ==
9/9/17; 16:15	Avondale	1-8 - 1-7	Arklow Geraldines-Ballymoney	Aughrim; Referee: Ciaran Fleming; Man of the Match: Saoirse Kearnon and Eugene Dunne
9/9/17; 16:15	Dean Gahan 1-1, Ian Heffernan 0-4 (0-3f), David Baker, Cian O'Hannain, Ryan Cahill 0-1 each		Cathal Kelleher 1-1, Stephen Hurley and Philip Healy 0-2f each, Philip Gleeson and Peter Hempenstall 0-1 each	Aughrim; Referee: Ciaran Fleming; Man of the Match: Saoirse Kearnon and Eugene Dunne

9/9/17; 18:00	Baltinglass	0-14 - 2-8	Éire Óg Greystones	Aughrim; Referee: Garrett Whelan; Man of the Match: Daniel Kelly
9/9/17; 18:00	Mark Jackson (0-2f, 2 '45) and Daniel Kelly (0-2f) 0-4 each, Adam McHugh 0-3 (0-2f), John McGrath, Chris Heaslip, Sean O'Brien 0-1 each		Daniel Keane 1-2, Billy Norman 1-1, Darren Hayden 0-2f, Danny Woods, Sean Lawless, Craig Smullen 0-1 each	Aughrim; Referee: Garrett Whelan; Man of the Match: Daniel Kelly

9/10/17; 13:30	Rathnew	2-13 - 2-6	Kiltegan	Aughrim; Referee: Kieron Kenny; Man of the Match: Jody Merrigan
9/10/17; 13:30	Jody Merrigan 1-4 (1 '45, 0-1f), Ross O'Brien 1-1, James Stafford, Eddie Doyle (0-2f), Leighton Glynn, Nicky Mernagh 0-2 each		Seanie Furlong 1-3 (0-2f), Derek Daly 1-0, Rory Finn, Podge O'Toole, Jeffery Bermingham 0-1 each	Aughrim; Referee: Kieron Kenny; Man of the Match: Jody Merrigan

9/10/17; 15:15	Blessington	1-10 - 1-7	St Patrick's	Aughrim; Referee: Anthony Nolan; Man of the Match: Paul McLoughlin
9/10/17; 15:15	Curtis Geraghty 1-1, Anto McLoughlin 0-4 (0-3f), Michael McLoughlin 0-2, Kevin John Rogers, Patrick O'Connor, Kevin Hanlon 0-1 each		Podge McWalter 1-0, Tommy Kelly 0-3, John Crowe, Eamon Wolfe, Stephen Duffy, Jordan Pettigrew 0-1 each	Aughrim; Referee: Anthony Nolan; Man of the Match: Paul McLoughlin

9/24/17; 14:30; Quarter-Final Replay	Baltinglass	2-14 - 1-12	Éire Óg Greystones	Aughrim

== Semi-finals ==
9/24/17; 16:15; Semi-Final	Blessington	2-14 - 2-5	Avondale	Aughrim; Referee: Garrett Whelan (Rathdangan)

10/8/17; 15:30; Semi-Final	Rathnew	1-9 - 0-8	Baltinglass	Aughrim; Referee: Declan Pepard (Hollywood); Man of the Match: Enan Glynn
10/8/17; 15:30; Semi-Final	Stephen Byrne 1-0, James Stafford 0-3, Eddie Doyle 0-2f, Warren Kavanagh, Enan Glynn, Leighton Glynn, Jody Merrigan (1 '45) 0-1 each		Mark Jackson (0-2f) and Daniel Kelly (0-2f) 0-2 each, Tom Burke, Mikey English, Sean O'Brien, Adam McHugh (0-1f) 0-1 each	Aughrim; Referee: Declan Pepard (Hollywood); Man of the Match: Enan Glynn

== Final ==
15 October 2017; 3:00 pm Final	Rathnew	3-8 - 0-12	Blessington	Aughrim Park; Referee: Declan Peppard (Hollywood); Man of the Match: Nicky Mernagh
15 October 2017; 3:00 pm Final	Mark Doyle 1-1, James Stafford and Leighton Glynn 1-0 each, Eddie Doyle 0-3 (0-2f), Theo Smith, Graham Merrigan, Nicky Mernagh, Jody Merrigan 0-1 each		Eoin Keogh, Anto McLoughlin, Patrick O'Connor, Curtis Geraghty (0-1f) 0-2 each, Paul McLoughlin, Brian Carroll, Michael McLoughlin, David Boothman 0-1 each	Aughrim Park; Referee: Declan Peppard (Hollywood); Man of the Match: Nicky Mernagh
