= 2024 O'Byrne Cup =

Gaelic games competition in Ireland

Tournament details
- Province: Leinster
- Trophy: O'Byrne Cup
- Date: 3–20 January 2024
- Teams: 11
- Defending champions: Longford

Winners
- Champions: Longford (5th win)
- Manager: Paddy Christie
- Captain: Patrick Fox

Runners-up
- Runners-up: Dublin
- Manager: Dessie Farrell

Other
- Matches played: 10 (Cup); 4 (Shield)

The 2024 O'Byrne Cup, known for sponsorship reasons as the Dioralyte O'Byrne Cup, was a Gaelic football tournament played by eleven county teams of Leinster GAA in January 2024; Kilkenny did not take part. Longford retained the trophy after beating Dublin in the final.

Teams defeated in their first match played in a shield tournament, which was won by Louth.

== Competition format ==
The eleven teams are drawn to play in a knockout system, with six teams playing in a preliminary round and the other five receiving a bye to the quarter-finals.

The three losers in the preliminary round and two of the quarter-final losers are transferred to the O'Byrne Shield, which is also a straight knockout. This structure means that every team, except for Dublin, is guaranteed at least two games.

== O'Byrne Cup ==
=== Round 1 ===
2 January 2024
Match 1

Wexford	4-15 (27) – (18) 2-12	Wicklow

HaloTile Centre of Excellence, Wexford

3 January 2024
Match 2

Carlow	0-10 (10) – (23) 2-17	Kildare

Netwatch Cullen Park, Carlow

3 January 2024
Match 3

Laois	0-12 (12) – (14) 1-11	Offaly

Laois Hire O'Moore Park, Portlaoise

=== Quarter-finals ===
6 January 2024
13:30 IWT (UTC±0)
Match 4

Report

Wexford	3-09 (18) – (14) 0-14	Kildare

Chadwicks Wexford Park, Wexford

6 January 2024
13:30 IWT (UTC±0)
Match 5

Report

Offaly	0-10 (10) – (11) 0-11	Dublin
Pts: C Farrell 4 (3f), D Hyland 3 (1f), N Dunne 1f, R McNamee 1, K McDermott 1		Pts: B O’Leary 4 (2f), C Dunne 2 (1f), K McGinnis 2 (1f), B Millist 1, E Dunne 1, S O’Leary 1

Gracefield GAA
Referee: Enda Kelly (Westmeath)
Attendance: 1,250

6 January 2024
13:30 IWT (UTC±0)
Match 6

Report

Longford	0-09 (9) – (7) 0-07	Westmeath
(HT: 0-05 – 0-04)

Glennon Bros Pearse Park, Longford
Referee: Kevin Williamson (Offaly)
Attendance: 400

6 January 2024
19:00 IWT (UTC±0)
Match 7

Report

Meath	2-13 (19) – (10) 1-07	Louth
(HT: 1-05 – 1-04)

Páirc Tailteann, Navan

=== Semi-finals ===
12 January 2024
19:30 IWT (UTC±0)
Match 8

Meath	1-14 (17) – (20) 2-14	Longford
(HT: 0-08 – 2-06)

Donaghmore Ashbourne GAA, Ashbourne
Referee: Colm McCullough (Louth)

TG4

13 January 2024
13:30 IWT (UTC±0)
Match 9

Report

Dublin	5-17 (32) – (14) 1-11	Wexford
Gls: S Lowry 3; L Breathnach 1, N Scully 1 Pts: D O’Hanlon 4 (3 45s, 1 f), L Breathnach 4, B O’Leary 2 (1f), K McGinnis 2, N Scully 1, B Millist 1, K Lahiff 1, P Duffy 1, C Dunne 1		Gls: C Walsh 1 Pts: B Brosnan 9 (7fs), T Byrne 1, C Hughes 1

Parnell Park, Donnycarney
Referee: Eamon O'Connor (Offaly)

=== Final ===
TG4

20 January 2024
15:00 IWT (UTC±0)
Match 10

Report

Longford	1-12 (15) – (9) 0-09	Dublin
(HT: 0-08 – 0-03)
Gls: K McGann 1 Pts: D Gallagher 4f, C McCabe 3 (1m), J Hagen 2, D Reynolds 1, M Hughes 1, D Duggan 1		Pts: K McGinnis 3 (2f), L Breathnach 2, N Scully 1, B O’Leary 1f, L Swan 1, C Basquel 1f

Laois Hire O'Moore Park, Portlaoise
Referee: James Foley (Carlow)

== O'Byrne Shield ==
=== Round 1 ===
6 January 2024
13:30 IWT (UTC±0)
Match A

Wicklow	1-12 (15) – (13) 0-13	Carlow

Bray Emmets GAA, Bray

=== Semi-finals ===
13 January 2024
12:00 IWT (UTC±0)
Match B

Wicklow	1-20 (23) – (15) 1-12	Laois

Rathnew GAA, Rathnew

13 January 2024
13:00 IWT (UTC±0)
Match C

Westmeath	0-12 (12) – (18) 2-12	Louth

Coralstown/Kinnegad GAA, Kinnegad

=== Shield Final ===
10 February 2024
12:00 IWT (UTC±0)

Report

Louth	1-18 (21) – (16) 2-10	Wicklow
(HT: 0-8 – 1-4)
Gls: S. Marry 1-0; Pts: D. McKeown 0-4 (1f), P. McStravick (2f), K. McElroy (1f) 0-3 each, J. Hughes (1f), J. Commins 0-2 each, T. Gray, B. Collier, C. McKeever, S. Marry 0-1 each		Gls: E. D'Arcy (pen), P. O'Toole 1-0 each Pts: E. D'Arcy 0-3 (2f), O. McGraynor (1f), L. O'Neill 0-2 each, C. Fee, F. O'Shea, G. Murphy 0-1 each

St Brigid's Park, Dundalk
Referee: Ian Howley (Dublin)

GK	1	Martin McEneaney (St Patrick's)
RCB	2	Oisín McGuinness (St Joseph's)
FB	3	Chris O'Neill (Seán O'Mahony's)
LCB	4	Cameron Maher (St Kevin's)
RHB	5	Leonard Grey (St Patrick's)
CHB	6	Niall Sharkey (Glyde Rangers)
LHB	7	Conall McKeever (Clan na Gael) (c)
MF	8	Conal McCaul (St Joseph's)
MF	9	Wayne Campbell (Naomh Máirtín)
RHF	10	Peter McStravick (Dundalk Young Irelands)
CHF	11	Seán Marry (St Bride's)
LHF	12	Jonathan Commins (St Mary's)
RCF	13	Kyle McElroy (O'Raghallaighs)
FF	14	Dylan McKeown (Dundalk Gaels)
LCF	15	Jay Hughes (Dreadnots)
Substitutes:
	16	Craig Lynch (Naomh Máirtín) for McEneaney
	17	Tom Gray (Naomh Máirtín) for McElroy
	18	Donal McKenny (St Mary's) for McGuinness
	19	Ciarán Murphy (St Patrick's) for Sharkey
	20	Ben Collier (St Joseph's) for McCaul
	21	Tom Jackson (St Mary's) for Grey
	22	Liam Flynn (Mattock Rangers) for McKeever
	23	Seán Reynolds (Stabannon Parnells) for Hughes

GK	1	Cathal Fitzgerald (Kiltegan)
RCB	2	Jack Treacy (Bray Emmets)
FB	3	Liam O'Neill (Coolkenno)
LCB	4	Fintan O'Shea (Éire Óg Greystones)
RHB	5	Karl Furlong (Baltinglass)
CHB	6	Eoin Murtagh (Dunlavin)
LHB	7	Zach Cullen (Avondale)
MF	8	Jack Kirwan (Baltinglass)
MF	9	Declan Doyle (Newtown)
RHF	10	Gavin Fogarty (An Tóchar)
CHF	11	Conor Fee (An Tóchar)
LHF	12	Cillian McDonald (Tinahely)
RCF	13	Eoin D'Arcy (Tinahely)
FF	14	Oisín McGraynor (Avondale)
LCF	15	Darragh Fee (An Tóchar)
Substitutes:
	16	Malachy Stone (Barndarrig) for Furlong
	17	Gearóid Murphy (Annacurra) for C. Fee
	18	Adam Arslan (Avoca) for D. Fee
	19	Martin Cullen (Barndarrig) for Z. Cullen
	20	Pádraig O'Toole (Kiltegan) for Doyle
	21	Dan Cooney (Blessington) for D'Arcy
