= 2016 Wicklow Senior Football Championship =

Wicklow S.F.C.
- Season: 2016
- Champions: Baltinglass
- Relegated: Aughrim; Hollywood; North District; St. Boden's
- Leinster SCFC: ???
- All Ireland SCFC: n/a
- Winning Captain: ???
- Man of the Match: ???
- Matches: 56

The 2016 Wicklow Senior Football Championship is the 116th edition of the Wicklow GAA's premier club Gaelic football tournament for senior graded teams in County Wicklow, Ireland. The tournament consists of 16 teams (14 clubs and 2 divisional sides), with the winner going on to represent Wicklow in the Leinster Senior Club Football Championship. The championship consists of a back door system.

Rathnew were the defending champions after they defeated St. Patrick's in the previous years final.

Tinahely, who lost last years relegation final, were given a reprieve and allow to keep their senior status when Rathnew 'B's won the I.F.C. in 2015. A reserve side can't compete in the S.F.C. so no team was promoted of relegated at the end of the 2015 season.

On 9 October 2016 Baltinglass claimed their 22nd S.F.C. and their first in 9 years when they defeated St. Patrick's 1-14 to 1-9 in Aughrim Park.

Divisional Sides:

- North District: – I.F.C. clubs An Tóchar & J.F.C. clubs Enniskerry, Fergal Óg, Kilcoole, Kilmacanogue and Newcastle.
- St. Boden's: – J.F.C. clubs Kilbride, Lacken and Valleymount.

== Team changes ==
The following teams have changed division since the 2015 championship season.

=== To S.F.C. ===
Promoted from I.F.C.

- None – (Rathnew 'B' were Intermediate Champions. Reserve sides cannot compete in the S.F.C.)

=== From S.F.C. ===
Relegated to I.F.C.

- None

== Round 1 ==
All 16 teams enter the competition in this round. The 8 winners progress to Round 2A while the 8 losers progress to Round 2B.

- St. Patrick's 2-13, 0-12 Éire Óg Greystones, Arklow, 15/7/2016,
- Tinahely 3-17, 0-7 Aughrim, Aughrim Park, 15/7/2016,
- Blessington 1-11, 2-5 Annacurra, Aughrim Park, 16/7/2016,
- Bray Emmets 3-13, 0-7 North District, Ashford, 16/7/2016,
- Rathnew 1-14, 2-9 Kiltegan, Aughrim Park, 16/7/2016,
- Baltinglass 4-15, 1-5 St. Boden's, Aughrim Park, 17/7/2016,
- Newtown 1-8 0-10 Avondale, Aughrim Park, 17/7/2016,
- Coolkenno 0-14, 0-8 Hollywood, Aughrim Park, 17/7/2016,

== Round 2 ==
=== Round 2A ===
The 8 winners from Round 1 play each other in this round. The 4 winners proceed to the quarter-finals while the 4 losers proceed to Round 3.

- Blessington 0-9, 0-8 Bray Emmets, Aughrim Park, 30/7/2016,
- St. Patrick's 1-15, 0-8 Coolkenno, Aughrim Park, 30/7/2016,
- Baltinglass 3-18, 0-8 Newtown, Aughrim Park, 31/7/2016,
- Rathnew 3-11, 0-14 Tinahely, Aughrim Park, 31/7/2016,

=== Round 2B ===
The 8 losers from Round 1 play each other in this round. The 4 winners proceed to Round 3 while the 4 losers must enter the Relegation Playoffs.

- Avondale 2-10, 1-11 Kiltegan, Aughrim Park, 31/7/2016,
- Hollywood 1-10, 1-7 Annacurra, Aughrim Park, 31/7/2016,
- North District 0-13, 1-8 St. Boden's, Aughrim Park, 1/8/2016,
- Éire Óg Greystones 1-18, 0-2 Aughrim, Aughrim Park, 1/8/2016,

== Round 3 ==
The 4 Round 2A losers play against the 4 Round 2B winners. The 4 winners of Round 3 enter the quarter-finals.

- Bray Emmets 2-12, 1-12 Hollywood, Aughrim Park, 19/8/2016,
- Avondale 3-7, 1-10 Tinahely, Arklow, 19/8/2016,
- Coolkenno 2-10, 0-10 Éire Óg Greystones, Aughrim Park, 20/8/2016,
- Newtown 1-11, 1-8 North District, Aughrim Park, 20/8/2016,

== Quarter-finals ==
The 4 Round 2A winners face the 4 Round 3 winners.

- Baltinglass 1-9, 2-3 Coolkenno, Aughrim Park, 10/9/2016,
- Blessington 2-17, 0-8 Avondale, Aughrim Park, 10/9/2016,
- St. Patrick's 0-18, 0-5 Newtown, Aughrim Park, 11/9/2016,
- Bray Emmets 2-7, 0-7 Rathnew, Aughrim Park, 11/9/2016,

== Semi-finals ==
- Baltinglass 1-8, 0-7 Bray Emmets, Aughrim Park, 24/9/2016,
- St. Patrick's 2-8, 0-7 Blessington, Aughrim Park, 25/9/2016,

== Final ==
- Baltinglass 1-14, 1-9 St. Patrick's, Aughrim Park, 9/10/2016, Report
