= Alan Byrne (Gaelic footballer) =

Irish sportsperson

Personal information
- Native name: Ailéin Ó Broin (Irish)
- Born: Wicklow, Ireland

Sport
- Sport: Gaelic Football
- Position: Left Corner Back
Club
- Years: Club
- Annacurra
Club titles
- Wicklow titles: 2
Inter-county
Years	County	Apps (scores)
2003-2015	Wicklow	22 (0-2)
Inter-county titles
- Leinster titles: 1 (Junior)
- All-Irelands: 1 (Junior)
- NFL: 1

Alan Byrne is an Irish sportsperson who played Gaelic football for Wicklow Senior Football Championship team Annacurra and was a member of the Wicklow senior team from 2003 until 2015. Byrne predominantly played as a corner back for Wicklow but in many central positions from centre back to centre forward for his club.

== Playing career ==
Byrne played at the intercounty level with both minor and under-21 county teams for several years. On the back of his performances, he was called into the Wicklow Junior team that won an All-Ireland Junior title in 2002 where he played in the cornerback position. The following year, he was a member of the senior side and made his championship debut as a sub vs Louth. He spent some time in the intercounty wilderness following the arrival of Hugh Kenny as manager. In 2007, Mick O'Dwyer arrived and Byrne was selected to play for O'Dwyer's senior squad. At that time, he won the Tommy Murphy Cup in 2007 and won an NFL Division 4 title in 2012. He scored his first intercounty point with the last kick of the game against Waterford in the 2012 qualifiers to force extra time, which eventually saw Wicklow progress to the next round. As a result of this performance, he made the Irish Independent team of the week.

Club

Byrne's club were involved in numerous heartache during the 2000s. They lost consecutive county finals to Ashford, Blessington, Newtown (after 2 replays and 2 periods of extra time), and Avondale. They then lost the 2008 final to Carnew before finally gaining senior status in 2010 with a narrow win over Éire Óg Greystones. Alan captained the team to this title and as a result of his performances over the year, he was awarded the Intermediate Player of the Year for the second occasion (first in 2008). Byrne's Annacurra team would return to Intermediate ranks towards the end of the decade and again would suffer back to back county final defeats to Eire Og in 2022 and Barndarrig in 2023.
