= Leighton Glynn =

Irish hurler and Gaelic footballer from Wicklow

Personal information
- Native name: Lachtnáin Mag Fhloinn (Irish)
- Nickname: Ginnet
- Born: 8 April 1982 (age 44) Glenealy, County Wicklow
- Height: 5 ft 11 in (180 cm)

Sport
- Football Position: Forward
- Hurling Position: Wing-Forward
Clubs
- Years: Club
- 2000 – present 1999 – present: Glenealy (Hurling); Rathnew (Football)
Club titles
	Football	Hurling
Wicklow titles	11	10
Leinster titles	1	0
Inter-county
- Years: County
- 2002 – present: Wicklow
Inter-county titles
	Football	Hurling
League titles	1	1

Leighton Glynn is a Gaelic football and hurling player from County Wicklow in Ireland. He was born and raised in Glenealy, County Wicklow. He has represented the Wicklow senior GAA teams in both football and hurling. At club level, he plays hurling for Glenealy and football for Rathnew.

== Playing career ==
Club

In December 2001, Leighton won a Leinster Senior Club Championship with Rathnew when they defeated a Na Fianna team that included Kieran McGeeney and Jason Sherlock after extra time in a replay. The first match which ended in a draw saw Leighton spring from the bench with Rathnew behind to score a point before Mark Doyle levelled to set up a replay. In the replay Leighton was named as corner back alongside current Wicklow full back Damian Power as Rathnew made history in capturing the title for the first time in their history in a score of 2–16 to 1–10 after extra time. He added other county titles in 2002, 2003, 2005, 2009, 2010. He has also won Wicklow Senior Hurling Championships 10 times in 2003, 2005, 2007, 2008, 2010, 2011 and 2012 with Glenealy.

Hurling

He was part of the Wicklow team that won the All Ireland B Championship in 2003 when they over came Roscommon in the final. Glynn was a member of the Wicklow squad which reached the National Hurling League Division Two final in 2007. In 2011 after a number of years away from intercounty hurling he rejoined the team and helped them to win a National Hurling League Div 3A title. Later he helped them reach a first Christy Ring Cup final but Kerry proved too strong on the day running out 2–21 to 2–09 winners. He was captain of the county team in 2006.

Football

Glynn first came on the inter-county scene in the mid-2000s. He won a Tommy Murphy Cup with Wicklow footballers under the then new manager Mick O'Dwyer. He played an instrumental role in the final, scoring 1–4 against Antrim. Glynn was also named as GPA Tommy Murphy Cup player of the year 2007. In 2008, Wicklow defeated Kildare in the Leinster Senior Football Championship (SFC) and reached the Lenister SFC quarter-final, where they lost narrowly to Laois. Glynn, again, was a major influence in those games and received the Vodafone Player of the Month award as a result. In the Tommy Murphy Cup, Wicklow reached the final again, but Antrim won that game. Glynn was selected in the Ireland squad for the 2008 International Rules Series. As a result of this, Glynn also picked up Wicklow Senior Footballer of the Year for 2008.

Leighton was named as Wicklow's senior football captain for 2009 and 2010. 2009 can be considered as one of Wicklow's most successful years. For the first time in their history, Wicklow played 6 Championship matches. In these 6 matches they defeated Longford in Leinster and they bet Fermanagh, Cavan and Down in the Qualifiers. Against Down, Leighton gave an inspirational performance and scored 1-3 from play. He was also given man of the match against Fermanagh where he gave a workman like performance to see Wicklow through to play Cavan. Leighton's run with Wicklow ended against a strong Kildare team who advanced to the 1/4 finals to play Tyrone.

In September 2009, Glynn was nominated for a GAA All Star Award, along with Arklow Geraldines Ballymoney's corner-back Ciarán Hyland.

In 2012, Glynn was captain of the Wicklow side that won the Div 4 National Football Lagaue title at Croke Park.

He was a selector under John Evans.

== Honours ==
=== Club ===
Rathnew

- Wicklow Senior Football Championship (12): 1999, 2000, 2001, 2002, 2003, 2005, 2009, 2010, 2013, 2014, 2015, 2017
- Leinster Senior Club Football Championship (1): 2001–2002

Glenealy

- Wicklow Senior Hurling Championship(10): 2003, 2005, 2007, 2008, 2010, 2011, 2012,2013, 2017, 2018

=== County ===
Wicklow GAA

Football

- Tommy Murphy Cup (1): 2007
- Runner Up: 2008
- National Football League Div 4 (1): 2012 (captain)

Hurling

- All Ireland B Championship: 2004
- National Hurling League Div 3A (1): 2011
- National Hurling League Div 2 Runner Up: 2007
- Christy Ring Cup Runner Up: 2011

=== Country ===
Ireland

- Cormac McAnallen Cup (2): 2008 2011 Runner Up 2010

=== Personal ===
- Vodafone Footballer of the Month (1): May 2008
- GPA's Tommy Murphy Cup Player of Year (1): 2007
- Wicklow Senior Footballer of the Year (1): 2008
- All-Star Nominee (1): 2009
