= Michael McLoughlin =

Irish Gaelic footballer

Personal information
- Born: Dublin, Ireland

Sport
- Sport: Gaelic Football
- Position: Right half back
Club
- Years: Club
- ?-: Blessington
Club titles
- Wicklow titles: 0
- Leinster titles: 0
- All-Ireland Titles: 0
Inter-county
- Years: County
- 2007-present: Wicklow
Inter-county titles
- Leinster titles: 0
- All-Irelands: 0
- NFL: 1

Michael "Mick" McLoughlin is an Irish Gaelic footballer for Wicklow. McLoughlin plays for the GAA club Blessington of West County Wicklow and is also a member of the Wicklow senior football team.
