= Harry Murphy (football manager) =

Irish Gaelic football manager

Personal information
- Native name: Anraí Ó Murchú (Irish)
- Born: Rathnew, County Wicklow

Sport
- Sport: Gaelic football
Club management
- Years: Club
- 1999–2011 2017–: Rathnew; Rathnew
	8	0	0
Inter-county management
- Years: Team
- 2011–2014: Wicklow

Harry Murphy (born 1958) is a Gaelic football manager from County Wicklow.

== Career ==
=== Rathnew ===
Murphy won a Leinster Senior Club Football Championship title with Rathnew in 2001, and also led the Wicklow side to seven County Senior Football Championship titles during his 12-year tenure, including four consecutive titles between 2000 and 2003.

He returned to the helm in 2017 and led Rathnew to another Senior title.

=== Wicklow ===
After former Kerry manager Mick O'Dwyer stepped down after a defeat to Armagh in 2011, Murphy was appointed as manager of the Wicklow senior football team on 29 August 2011.

Sporting positions
Preceded by Mick O'Dwyer	Wicklow Senior Football Manager; 2011–2014	Succeeded by Johnny Magee
