= Tony Hannon =

Irish Gaelic footballer

Personal information
- Native name: Antóin Ó hAnnáin (Irish)
- Born: 26 November 1977 (age 48) County Wicklow

Sport
- Sport: Gaelic football
- Position: Centre-forward
Club
- Years: Club
- 1994-: Hollywood
Inter-county
- Years: County
- 1996-2012: Wicklow
Inter-county titles
- Leinster titles: 0
- All-Irelands: 0
- NFL: 1

Tony Hannon (born 26 November 1977) is an Irish sportsperson who currently plays Gaelic football for Wicklow Senior Football Championship team Hollywood and was a member of the Wicklow senior team from 1996 to 2012.
