= Tommy Glynn =

Irish hurler and Gaelic footballer

Personal information
- Native name: Tomas Mag Fhloinn (Irish)
- Born: Glenealy, County Wicklow

Sport
- Football Position: Forward/Sweeper
- Hurling Position: Midfielder/Forward
Clubs
- Years: Club
- Glenealy (Hurling); Rathnew (Football)
Inter-county
- Years: County
- 196?-198?: Wicklow

Tommy Glynn is a former Gaelic football and hurling player from County Wicklow in Ireland. He played hurling with Wicklow for 16 years and also played with the football team. He won an All Ireland Junior medal with Wicklow in 1969 when they beat Kerry in the final. His sons Leighton and Enan have both played and captained Wicklow football and hurling teams.
