= John Flynn (Gaelic footballer) =

Irish sportsperson

Personal information
- Native name: Seán Ó Floinn (Irish)
- Born: 5 June 1984 (age 42) Baltinglass, County Wicklow

Sport
- Sport: Gaelic football
- Position: Goalkeeper
Club
- Years: Club
- 2003-: Baltinglass
Club titles
- Wicklow titles: 2
Inter-county
- Years: County
- 2003-2012 2013-: Wicklow
Inter-county titles
- Leinster titles: 0
- All-Irelands: 0
- NFL: 1

John Flynn (born 5 June 1984) is an Irish sportsperson who currently plays Gaelic football for Wicklow Senior Football Championship team Baltinglass and was a member of the Wicklow senior team from 2003 to 2012. While Flynn remained as a sub for most he was called up in 2010 after the current goalkeeper Mervyn Travers sustained a serious knee injury which forced him out, Flynn subsequently replaced Travers and remained in goalkeeping position. In October 2012, Flynn announced his retirement from inter-county football. Flynn returned to the panel in early 2013 after being recalled.
