= Johnny Magee =

Irish Gaelic footballer and manager

Personal information
- Native name: Seán Mag Aoidh (Irish)
- Born: 30 May 1978 (age 48) Dublin, Ireland
- Height: 1.85 m (6 ft 1 in)

Sport
- Sport: Gaelic football
- Position: Centre Back
Club
- Years: Club
- 1987-2012: Kilmacud Crokes
Club titles
- Dublin titles: 5
- Leinster titles: 3
- All-Ireland Titles: 1
Inter-county
- Years: County
- 1997-2007: Dublin
Inter-county titles
- Leinster titles: 2

Jonathan "Johnny" Magee is an Irish Gaelic football manager and former player and former manager of the Wicklow footballers. He played club football for Kilmacud Crokes and inter-county football for Dublin.

== Football career ==
=== Inter-county ===
Magee played at half back for Dublin in the late 90s and early years of the 21st century. He made his senior football debut for Dublin against Sligo in the 1997 National Football League, although he had previously appeared for Dublin in the O'Byrne Cup against Wexford in 1996. In 2003, Magee was substituted against Armagh during an All-Ireland quarter final to allow a reserve goalkeeper to come on following the sending off of Stephen Cluxton. Seen by several commentators as having his best ever game for the Dubs, Magee's absence was immediately felt and Armagh went on to win the game. After a two-year absence, Magee returned to the Dublin senior football panel for 2007. He won the 2007 O'Byrne Cup for Dublin against Laois at O'Connor Park in Offaly. The game finished on a scoreline of 1–18 to 2–13 against Laois.

Magee made a late appearance in the Leinster Senior Football final playing for less than a minute before the final whistle.

=== Club ===
He played Centre back & midfield for Kilmacud Crokes when they won the Dublin Senior Football Championship in 1998, 2004, 2005, 2008 and 2010. His team progressed to win the Leinster Club Football Championship in three of those years: 2005, 2008 and 2010. He captained the team to win the All-Ireland Senior Club Football Championship in Croke Park on 17 March 2009, beating Crossmaglen Rangers on a scoreline of 1–9 to 0–7.

== Outside football ==
Away from football, Magee took part in a charity boxing match in 2004 against snooker player Quinten Hann in Dublin after the Australian questioned the physical strength of Gaelic football players in the media. The fight took place at Dublin's National Stadium. Magee broke Hann's nose and won in three rounds.

Sporting positions
Preceded by Harry Murphy	Wicklow Senior Football Manager; 2014–2017	Succeeded by John Evans
