= Annacurra =

Village in County Wicklow, Ireland

Annacurra Áth na Cora
- Village
- Location within Ireland
- Coordinates: 52.842°N 6.357°W
- Country: Ireland
- County: County Wicklow
- Barony: Ballinacor South
- Irish grid reference: T107779

Annacurra or Annacurragh (Irish: Áth na Cora) is a small village in South-East County Wicklow, Ireland. It is located just off the R747 road which runs from Arklow to Baltinglass and is about 1.5 miles from Aughrim. The River Derry runs through the village.

== Amenities ==
The village has a pub and a national (primary) school. The school, known as St. Brigid's National School or Annacurra National School, had an enrollment of over 120 pupils in 2025. The local Catholic church, also dedicated to St. Brigid, is within the Roman Catholic Diocese of Ferns. The church was built in 1862.

== Sport ==
The village's Gaelic Athletic Association (GAA) club, Annacurra GAA (or Áth an Churraigh in Irish), had a number of successes in the early days of organised Gaelic games. The club won the first three Wicklow Senior Football Championship titles between 1887 and 1889, and went on to win the competition a total of nine times. As of 2011, the club were a senior team, having won promotion by winning the Wicklow Intermediate Championship in 2010. The club plays its home games at Joey Doyle Park and its colours are green and yellow. Clubman Alan Byrne played on the Wicklow senior football team for several years. John Timmons and Joe Timmons also previously played with the club.

== See also ==
- List of towns and villages in Ireland
