= Shane Cooke =

Irish Gaelic footballer

Personal information
- Born: Dublin, Ireland

Sport
- Position: Forward
Club
- Years: Club
- ? 1983-2008: St Mary's
Inter-county*
Years	County	Apps (scores)
2001 2004 2005 2006	Laois	4 (0-2); 9 (3-9); 8 (3-15) 7 (0-9)
- *Inter County team apps and scores correct as of 12 March 2007.

Shane Cooke is a Dublin-born Gaelic footballer who played for Laois under the parentage rule.

At club level, Cooke usually lined out in attack with St Mary's GAA (Dublin). He captained St Mary's in 2004 to a league title and also won a senior hurling championship with Commercials hurling club (Rathcoole) 2004.

In April 2001, he made his Laois debut in an NFL tie with Sligo but after appearing against Wexford and Derry in the championship later that year he then disappeared off the intercounty scene for two seasons. He returned to training in 2003 under Mick O'Dwyer and continued in National league and Championship until 2006

Cooke opted off the Laois squad for 2007 due to family commitments.
