= Joe Timmons (Gaelic footballer) =

Irish Gaelic footballer

Personal information
- Native name: Seosamh Ó Tiomáin (Irish)
- Born: 16 August 1933 Dublin, Ireland
- Died: 30 January 2009 (aged 75) Clondalkin, Dublin, Ireland
- Occupation: Roadstone employee

Sport
- Sport: Gaelic football
- Position: Left corner-back
Clubs
- Years: Club
- Annacurra; St Mary's; Seán McDermotts
Club titles
- Dublin titles: 0
Inter-county
- Years: County
- Wicklow; Dublin
Inter-county titles
- Leinster titles: 2
- All-Irelands: 1
- NFL: 1

Joe Timmons (16 August 1933 – 30 January 2009) was an Irish Gaelic footballer who played as a left corner-back at senior level for the Dublin county team.

Timmons began his inter-county career as a member of the senior Wicklow team in the early 'fifties. He later declared for Dublin and had much success going forward into the early 'sixties. During that time he won one All-Ireland medal, two Leinster medals and one National Football League medal.

At club level Timmons began his career with Annacurra in Wicklow, before going on to play for St Mary's and Seán McDermotts in Dublin.

His brother, John Timmons, was also an All-Ireland medalist with Dublin.
