= John Timmons (Gaelic footballer) =

Irish Gaelic footballer

Personal information
- Native name: Seán Ó Tiomáin (Irish)
- Nickname: Big John
- Born: 1936 Dublin, Ireland
- Died: 29 June 1984 (aged 47) Dublin, Ireland
- Occupation: Haulage contractor
- Height: 6 ft 1 in (185 cm)

Sport
- Sport: Gaelic football
- Position: Midfield
Clubs
- Years: Club
- Annacurra; St Mary's; Seán McDermotts
Club titles
- Dublin titles: 0
Inter-county
- Years: County
- 1953-1958 1958-1965: Wicklow; Dublin
Inter-county titles
- Leinster titles: 5
- All-Irelands: 2
- NFL: 0

John Timmons (1936 – 29 June 1984) was an Irish Gaelic footballer who played for club sides Annacurra, St Mary's and Seán McDermotts and at inter-county level with the Wicklow and Dublin senior football teams.

== Career ==
Timmons first came to prominence at inter-county level alongside his brother Joe as a player with his adopted Wicklow, however, he was persuaded to join the Dublin] senior team in 1958. He made his first appearance for the team against Meath and ended his debut season with an All-Ireland medal after a defeat of Derry in the final. Timmons won five Leinster Championship medals in total, including one as team captain, while he also collected a second All-Ireland title after the 1963 final defeat of Galway. He also won back-to-back Railway Cup medals with Leinster.

== Personal life and death ==
Although born in Dublin, Timmons spent much of his youth with his maternal grandparents in Annacurra, County Wicklow. He later worked as a haulage contractor with Cement Roadstone. Timmons died suddenly on 29 June 1984 while walking his dog by the Grand Canal.

== Honours ==
Dublin

- All-Ireland Senior Football Championship: 1958, 1963
- Leinster Senior Football Championship: 1958, 1959, 1962, 1963, 1965 (c)

Leinster

- Railway Cup: 1961, 1962

Sporting positions
Preceded by	Dublin Senior Football Captain; 1965	Succeeded by
