= 2009 Leinster Senior Club Football Championship =

Tournament details
- County: Leinster
- Year: 2009

The Leinster Senior Club Football Championship 2009 will be the 42nd staging of the annual Leinster Senior Club Football Championship ran by the Leinster GAA. The competition will see the county champions of eleven counties of Leinsters compete for the title. The Kilkenny Senior Football Championship winners do not take part in the senior championship. The winners will be awarded the Cup and will go on to compete in the 2010 All-Ireland Senior Club Football Championship. The championship is scheduled to start on 25 October 2009 and conclude with the final on 6 December 2009.

Kilmacud Crokes are the current holders – beating ? in the Leinster Senior Club Football Championship 2008 final at ?.

== Format ==
The championship takes the structure of an open-draw knock-out.

== Competing teams ==
Each county in Leinster holds its own County Championship. The winner of the eleven championships qualify for the Leinster Club Championship.

Team	Qualified as	Last appearance	Notes
Rathvilly	Carlow Champions	2004	Rathvilly were knocked out at the quarter-final stage of the competition by Clara of Offaly.
Ballyboden St. Enda's	Dublin Champions	1995	
St Laurence's	Kildare Champions	First Appearance	Knocked out in the first round by Clara
Portlaoise	Laois Champions	2008	Won the competition in 2004 and went on to be all-Ireland club champions in March 2005.
Clonguish	Longford Champions	2008	
Mattock Rangers	Louth Champions	2005	Knocked out in the first round by Portlaoise.
Senchelstown	Meath Champions	2007	Knocked out at the quarter-final stage by Portlaoise of Laois.
Clara	Offaly Champions	2003	
Garrycastle	Westmeath Champions	2004	
Horsewood	Wexford Champions	2006	Knocked out in the first round by Clonguish.
Rathnew	Wicklow Champions	2005	Won the competition in 2001. Knocked out at the quarter-final stage by Ballyboden St. Enda's

== First round ==
25 October 2009	Mattock Rangers (Louth)	0-02 – 2-21	Portlaoise (Laois)	Portlaoise
25 October 2009	D Reid 0-1 (0-1f), C Grimes 0-1 (0-1f)		B Fitzgerald 1-4 (0-1f), P Cahillane 1-2 (0-2f), C Rogers 0-4, Z Tuohy 0-3 (0-1f), B McCormack, P McNulty 0-2 each, B Mulligan, K Lillis, A Kelly, R Maher 0-1 each	Portlaoise

25 October 2009	Clara (Offaly)	1-12 – 2-08	St Laurences (Kildare)	Newbridge; Referee: D Fahey (Longford)
25 October 2009	R Brady 0-1; J O’Hara 0-1, E Brady 1-0, J Reynolds 0-5, T Deehan 0-5(fs).		T O’Neill 0-1, B Mackey 0-2(fs), R Lawlor 1-2, J Fogarty 1-2, D Lawlor 0-1.	Newbridge; Referee: D Fahey (Longford)

25 October 2009	Clonguish (Longford)	2-10 – 0-05	Horsewood (Wexford)	Newbridge

== Quarter finals ==
8 November 2009	Portlaoise (Laois)	3-12 – 1-06	Senchelstown (Meath)	Portlaoise

8 November 2009	Clara (Offaly)	0-14 – 1-08	Rathvilly (Carlow)	Tullamore

8 November 2009	Clonguish (Longford)	0-15 – 1-14	Garrycastle (Westmeath)	Longford

8 November 2009; 2.30	Ballyboden St. Enda's (Dublin)	1-10 – 1-07	Rathnew (Wicklow)	Parnell Park; Referee: Maurice Deegan
8 November 2009; 2.30	C Keaney 0-5 (0-3f), D Shovlin 1-0, D OMahony, S Lambert, K Naughton, A Kerin (0-1f), P Galvin 0-1 each.		T Gill 0-5 (0-5f), L Glynn 1-1, N Mernagh 0-1.	Parnell Park; Referee: Maurice Deegan

== Semi finals ==
22 November 2009	Ballyboden St. Enda's (Dublin)	0-00 – 0-00	Garrycastle (Westmeath)	Westmeath

22 November 2009	Clara (Offaly)	0-03 – 1-09	Portlaoise (Laois)	Portlaoise
22 November 2009	P Cahillane 1-3 (1-0 pen); B Fitzgerald (0-2f), P McNulty 0-2 each, B Smyth, J Fennell 0-1 each.		T Deehan (0-1f), S Deehan, J O’Hara 0-1 each.	Portlaoise
