= Mervyn Travers =

Irish Gaelic footballer

Personal information
- Born: 9 October 1985 (age 41) Arklow, County Wicklow

Sport
- Sport: Gaelic football
- Position: Goalkeeper
Club
- Years: Club
- Arklow Geraldines Ballymoney
Inter-county
- Years: County
- 2007 - 2010: Wicklow

Mervyn Travers (born 9 October 1985) is an Irish sportsperson who formerly played Gaelic football for Wicklow Senior Football Championship club Arklow Geraldines Ballymoney and the Wicklow county team since making his debut in 2007. In 2010 in a match vs Westmeath, Travers ruptured his patella and broke his knee cap. After not being able to fully recover he took the role of manager at his club, Arklow Geraldines Ballymoney as manager.
