= Mike Hassett =

Irish Gaelic footballer

Personal information
- Born: Killorglin, County Kerry
- Occupation: Teacher

Sport
- Sport: Football
- Position: Full/half back
Clubs
- Years: Club
- 1990's-2000 2001-: Laune Rangers; An Tóchar
Club titles
- Kerry titles: 3
- Munster titles: 2
- All-Ireland Titles: 1
Inter-county
| Years | County | Apps (scores) |
| 1994-2001 | Kerry | 20 (0-01) |
Inter-county titles
- Munster titles: 4
- All-Irelands: 1
- NFL: 1
- All Stars: 0

Mike Hassett (born in Killorglin, County Kerry) is a former Irish sportsperson. He played Gaelic football with his local club Laune Rangers and was a member of the Kerry senior inter-county team from 1994 until 2001.Father Micheal Hassett and mother Bridie Hassett also have another Kerry player in the family

== Club ==
At club level he had much success with Laune Rangers. His first success came when he won a Kerry Senior Football Championship in 1993. He would win a second title in 1995 as well as winning an Under 21 title, and he later won a Munster Senior Club Football Championship. On St. Particks Day 1996 he was part of the side that won the clubs first All-Ireland Senior Club Football Championship. Later in 1996 he won his third county title a well as a second Munster title.

He also won Kerry County Football League – Division 1 titles in 1992 and between 1994 and 1998. As well as a number of Mid Kerry Senior Football Championship titles.

He also won a Kerry Under 21 Football Championship in 1995 with the club.

He also played with Wicklow side An Tóchar. He helped the side win a Leinster Junior Club Football Championship in 2001.

== Schools ==
Hassett lined out with the Kerry Vocational Schools team in the early 90s. He was on the losing side to Cork in the Munster final in 1991

== Underage ==
Hassett played with Kerry at minor level in 1991 and 1992. He lined out in Munster Minor Football Championship finals in both seasons but lost out to Cork in both.

In 1993 he joined the Kerry Under-21 team. Wins over Cork and Waterford saw him pick up a Munster Under-21 Football Championship title, where he scored a point in the final. A win over Galway saw Hassett and co qualify for an All-Ireland Under-21 Football Championship final with Meath. Kerry came up short after a 1–08 to 0–10 scoreline in the end.

He was again part of the team in 1994 but lost out to Cork in the first round.

In 1995 wins over Clare and Waterford saw Hassett pick up his second Munster Under-21 Football Championship title, where he scored two points in the final. In the All-Ireland semi-final Kerry get over Donegal and book a second All=Ireland final in three seasons. In the final they faced Mayo. A replay was need but Hassett won an All-Ireland Under-21 Football Championship medal after a 3–10 to 1–12 win.

== Senior ==
Hassett joined the Kerry senior side during the 1993/94 National Football League playing three games He made his Munster Senior Football Championship debut against Limerick later that season. He later played in the Munster semi-final loss to Cork.

He played in all bar one of Kerry's National Football League games in the 1994/95 season. Later that summer wins over Limerick and Tipperary saw Hassett qualify for a first Munster Senior Football Championship. In the final, despite a point from Hassett, Kerry fell short to Cork on a 0–15 to 1–09 scoreline.

He would only play in three of Kerry's 1995/96 League games. Wins again over Tipperary and Waterford saw Hassett and co back in the Munster final against Cork. A 0–14 to 0–11 win saw Kerry win a first Munster title since 1991 and a first senior title for Hassett. In the All-Ireland final Kerry faced Mayo. It was many of the Kerry sides, including Hassetts, first game in Croke Park and Mayo had too much for the young Kingdom side on a 2–13 to 1–10 scoreline.

Hassett was appointed captain of the Kerry side for the 1996/97 season. He would go on to captain the side to the National League title after a win over Cork in the final. He missed out on the side Munster championship opener with Tipperary, but was back for the final against Clare. In the end Hassett won his second Munster title after a 1–13 to 0-11 point win as well as accepting the cup as captain. Injury lead to him missing out on the All-Ireland Semi-final and later final that Kerry won. This led to his younger brother Liam standing in as captain.

There was controversy at the end of the year when he did not receive an All Ireland medal which led to him and brother Liam not playing with Kerry for the 1998 season.

He made his return to the team in the team during the 1998/99 League His only championship game was when he came on as a sub in his sides Munster semi-final was over Clare.

He played in all eight of Kerry's 1999/00 National League games a Kerry lot out to Meath in the semi-final. Come championship he appeared as a sub in Kerry's first three games, including the Munster final win over Clare. He was a sub once more in the drawn All-Ireland semi-final with Armagh, he was back in the starting lineup for the replay that Kerry won after extra-time. He was at Left corner back for the [[2000 All-Ireland Senior Football Championship Final]|All-Ireland final]] with Galway. The side ended level at full time on a 0-14 each scoreline. He again started for the replay that Kerry would go on to win on a 0–17 to 1–10 scoreline. Where he had missed out in 1997 Hassett won his first medal without issue.

He would only play in two National League games in the 2000/01 season. He played no part in Kerry's opening two Munster championship games, but appeared as a sub to win his fourth Munster title. He would again come on as Kerry drew with Dublin in the All-Ireland Quarter-final in Thurles. He was surprisingly back in the starting line up for the All-Ireland semi-final with Meath. While many expected a classic between the previous two All-Ireland champions, it was anything but as Kerry fell to one of their biggest championship losses on a 2–14 to 0–05 scoreline. Despite being just 27 years old it would turn out to be his last game with Kerry.

Sporting positions
| Preceded by Billy O Shea | Kerry Senior Football Captain; 1997 | Succeeded by Liam Hassett |
