= Raymond Daniels (Gaelic footballer) =

Irish Gaelic footballer

Personal information
- Born: 1979 Dunlavin County Wicklow, Ireland
- Died: 26 January 2008 (aged 28) Blessington, Ireland

Sport
- Sport: Gaelic football
- Position: Goalkeeper
Clubs
- Years: Club
- 2000–2008: Wicklow Senior; Blessington GAA

Raymond Daniels (22 July 1979 – 26 January 2008) was a Gaelic footballer from County Wicklow. He was goalkeeper for Wicklow's senior football team for several seasons during eight years.

== Playing career ==
Daniels won a Leinster title with the Wicklow Vocational Schools team. He played under-21 football for Wicklow. He was named player of the year in Dunlavin in 1997 and in Blessington in 2003. He made his senior football championship debut against Carlow in May 2006. A groin injury sustained in a National Football League game against Sligo in April 2007 kept Daniels away from football, but he had planned to resume training.

== Illness and death ==
In October 2007, Daniels was admitted to hospital with an infection that caused one of his kidneys to fail. On Tuesday 22 January 2008, Daniels had gotten the all-clear from doctors. He socialised with friends on the following Saturday. He had a suspected heart attack. He was brought to hospital, where he was pronounced dead. He was 28. A minute's silence was observed before Wicklow's GAA games on Sunday 27 January. Former GAA President Jack Boothman, the current President of Blessington GAA, described Daniels as a "gifted footballer and goalkeeper". Former Wicklow manager Hugh Kenny also praised Daniels.
