= Micko =

Irish documentary

- Genre: Documentary
- Starring: Mick O'Dwyer
- Country of origin: Ireland

Production
- Running time: 1 hour
- Production company: Loosehorse

Original release
- Network: RTÉ One
- Release: 8 January 2018

Micko is a documentary about Mick O'Dwyer.

It first aired on RTÉ One on 8 January 2018. Loosehorse were responsible for putting it together.

O'Dwyer described Eoin Liston as "a great man for the Mars bars and a packet of Smarties."

O'Dwyer was 81 at the time Micko aired.
