= Ciarán Hyland =

Irish Gaelic footballer

Personal information
- Born: Arklow County Wicklow, Ireland

Sport
- Sport: Gaelic football
- Position: Corner Back
Club
- Years: Club
- 1998 - Present: Arklow Geraldine's Ballymoney
Inter-county
- Years: County
- 2003-2018: Wicklow

Ciarán Hyland is a Gaelic footballer from County Wicklow, Ireland. He plays with the Wicklow intercounty team with whom he won a Tommy Murphy Cup medal in 2007. He won €124,000 during an appearance on the National Lottery's summer scratch-card TV game show The Big Money Game in 2009. In September 2009 Hyland was nominated for a GAA All Star Award, along with Wicklow teammate Leighton Glynn. In 2012 he was part of the Wicklow team that won the National League Div 4 title scoring a goal in the win over Fermanagh. In the summer of 2018 Hyland decided to call time on his inter-county football career after playing for 16years.
