= Hugh Kenny =

Irish Gaelic footballer and manager

Personal information
- Native name: Aodh Ó Cionnaith (Irish)
- Born: Baltinglass, County Wicklow

Sport
- Sport: Gaelic football
- Position: Full-back
Club
- Years: Club
- 1980s-2000s: Baltinglass
Club titles
- Wicklow titles: 9
- Leinster titles: 1
- All-Ireland Titles: 1
Inter-county
- Years: County
- 1985-1998: Wicklow

Hugh Kenny is a former Irish Gaelic footballer from Baltinglass in County Wicklow. Kenny was part of the Baltinglass team that dominated Wicklow football in the 1980s and 1990s, winning an All-Ireland Senior Club Football Championship Title in 1990. He also managed the Wicklow from 2003 to 2006 but resigned following heavy defeat to Carlow. He also played Full Back on the Wicklow team that beat Kerry in the 2002 All-Ireland Junior Football Championship.

He was Kilmacud Crokes senior football manager from 2012 to 2013.

Hugh Kenny has been the Wicklow GAA games development manager since 1997.

Sporting positions
Preceded by John O'Leary	Wicklow Senior Football Manager; 2003-2006	Succeeded by Mick O'Dwyer
