= Wicklow county football team =

Gaelic football team

Wicklow
- Sport: Football
- Irish: Cill Mhantáin
- Nickname(s): The Garden County
- County board: Wicklow GAA
- Manager: Oisín McConville
- Home venue(s): Aughrim County Ground

Recent competitive record
- Current All-Ireland status: Leinster (QF) in 2025
- Last championship title: None
- Current NFL Division: 4 (3rd in 2025)
- Last league title: None
First colours	Second colours

The Wicklow county football team (/ˈwɪkloʊ/ WIK-loh) represents Wicklow in men's Gaelic football and is governed by Wicklow GAA, the county board of the Gaelic Athletic Association. The team competes in the three major annual inter-county competitions; the All-Ireland Senior Football Championship, the Leinster Senior Football Championship and the National Football League.

Wicklow's home ground is Aughrim County Ground. The team's manager is Oisín McConville.

The team has never won the Leinster Senior Championship or the All-Ireland Senior Championship, and are the only county besides Fermanagh never to have won its provincial championship. The most notable achievements of the team include a Division 4 National League title in 2012 and a Tailteann Cup title in 2026.

== History ==
Wicklow are one of two county teams never to have won a senior provincial football championship (the other is Fermanagh).

However, Bray Emmets, the leading side of the early 1900s, won Leinster and All-Ireland honours when they were playing in the Dublin Championship. Wicklow were twice proclaimed Leinster champions for short periods. Bray were representing Wicklow in 1889, and when they beat Newtown Blues of Drogheda by 1–7 to 1-4 they claimed that they had won the "final of Leinster" because Queens County or Kilkenny had not shown up for a final. But four days later the result was quashed. In 1897 they became Leinster champions for a week. A downpour caused Dublin to presume the Leinster final would not be played, Dublin went home, the referee awarded a walkover to Wicklow. But the following meeting of the Central Council ordered the match to be replayed and Wicklow lost by 1–9 to 0–3.

A League semi-final in frostbound 1947 came about in bizarre fashion: Wicklow were picked to represent an unfinished group in which some of the teams had not yet played. In 1954 Wicklow were leading Meath by two points after sixty minutes of play but Meath were saved by the clock. Nine minutes of lost time had elapsed before Meath scored the winning point! After surviving the "long count" Meath went on to win the All-Ireland, and Wicklow lost their best player of the decade, John Timmons, to Dublin.

In 1986 they pulled off a huge upset beating newly crowned League champions Laois in the Leinster Quarter-final on a scorching hot June day in Aughrim by 2–10 to 1–9, Wicklow legend Kevin O'Brien scored 2–3 in that game. However, they were no match for Meath, who knocked them out in the Leinster semi-final.

A near thing against Meath, just off their four-match with Dublin in 1991 (Wicklow drew 0–12 to 1-9 and lost the replay by three points) heralded a great start to the 1990s. But Wicklow's only championship wins since were against Longford and Westmeath, and a 1996 League quarter-final appearance against Donegal their nearest to a breakthrough. Lying in wait for complacent opponents, particularly in Aughrim, for unsuspecting opposition has been the Wicklow trademark since. Exploits included a 1986 win over newly crowned League champions Laois at Aughrim, and a 1981 defeat by just two points against Dublin in the Leinster SFC quarter-final, after a miracle save in the last minute by Dublin's goalkeeper John O'Leary.

=== Since 2000 ===
The early part of the 2000s were very lean for Wicklow, with them winning very few championship matches; however, they did produce a number of competitive results and were unfortunate in several games. Under the management of Hugh Kenny, Wicklow lined out against Meath in the opening round of the 2004 Leinster SFC. They were playing exceptionally well and were leading Meath by 1–6 to 0-7 early in the second half when midfielder Ciaran Clancy was harshly sent off. This seemed to knock the stuffing out of Wicklow who never recovered and were hammered 2–13 to 1–8, Derry then knocked Wicklow out of the championship in the Qualifiers by 1–15 to 1–10.

Against Kildare in the opening round of the 2005 Leinster Championship they came very close to a first win leading Kildare but unfortunately for Wicklow, the age old problem of not being able to close out a game surfaced, and they were ultimately beaten by 1–17 to 2–12, Donegal then knocked Wicklow out of the Qualifiers beating them by 0–16 to 0–12.

=== Under Mick O'Dwyer ===
In October 2006, legendary former Kerry manager and player Mick O'Dwyer took over as Wicklow manager. During his tenure Wicklow's championship results improved, while Wicklow had shown promise in 2004 and 2005, they suffered two heavy defeats in the 2006 championship. In 2007 under Mick O'Dwyer they played Louth in the first round of the Leinster Championship, taking Louth to two replays before finally being beaten; however, later that year, they went on to win the 2007 Tommy Murphy Cup, defeating Antrim in dramatic fashion with a late Tommy Gill goal in extra-time, securing the Wicklow senior footballers a second ever national trophy, and first ever win at Croke Park. As Wicklow were a Division 4 team they were not permitted to enter the 2007 backdoor.

Going into the 2008 championship, Wicklow had not won a championship game since beating London on 8 June 2002, and had not won a Leinster Championship 1st round proper game since beating Longford by one point in 1996 (they won a Leinster group game in 2000, but this was the only year under that format). They faced a heavily fancied Kildare in the 1st round and completed arguably their greatest ever championship win beating Kildare 0–13 to 0–9, this was also their first ever championship win at Croke Park, they went on to lose narrowly to Laois in the Quarter-Final. Again as they were a Division 4 team they were not permitted to enter the qualifiers, so they went on to try and defend the Tommy Murphy Cup but ultimately lost to Antrim in the final.

The 2009 Championship was one of the most memorable in Wicklow's history, they won their Leinster 1st-round game against Longford by 2–12 to 1-13 before narrowly losing to Westmeath in the next round by 0–16 to 1–10. Division 4 teams were allowed to enter the Qualifiers again by 2009 and so Wicklow began their campaign by beating Fermanagh 0–17 to 1–11 in the 1st round, they then comfortably beat Cavan by 1–12 to 0–8 in the 2nd round, they dramatically beat Down by 1–15 to 0-17 thanks to a late 45' that was scored by Tony Hannon before their famous run finally came to an end when Kildare beat them by 1–16 to 2–9 in the last round of the Qualifiers.

In 2010, Wicklow beat Carlow in the 1st round of the Leinster championship but again narrowly lost out in the Quarter-final, this time to Westmeath by a single point, 0–15 to 1-11 but unfortunately they were unable to repeat their historic 2009 Qualifier run losing out to Cavan in the 1st round, agonisingly by a single point again, 0–15 to 2–8.

Wicklow's 2011 Leinster campaign started poorly with a 0–12 to 0-5 1st round defeat by Kildare; however, they bounced back well, defeating Sligo by 1–18 to 0–16 in the 1st round of the Qualifiers, in the 2nd round they drew with Armagh 0–19 to 2-13 before losing the replay at home by 2–9 to 0–10. This brought an end to Mick O'Dwyer's five years as manager of the Wicklow footballers.

=== After O'Dwyer ===
Harry Murphy succeeded O'Dwyer as manager in 2011. He lasted until 2014.

Johnny Magee succeeded Murphy as manager in 2014. He lasted until 2017.

John Evans took over as manager in 2017. He lasted until 2019.

Davy Burke took over as manager in 2019. He departed as manager in 2021.

In October 2021, former Louth manager Colin Kelly succeeded Burke as manager A few months later, in March 2022, Kelly left citing work commitments.

After Kelly resigned suddenly during the league campaign in early 2022, Alan Costello and Gary Duffy were appointed joint interim managers in March 2022. They were succeeded by Oisín McConville in September 2022.

Wicklow faced Down in the 2026 Tailteann Cup final; though 12 points behind at half time, Wicklow won 1-21 to 2-16, securing a place in the 2027 All-Ireland Senior Football Championship.

== Crest and colours ==
Wicklow's traditional team colours are royal blue and gold. The kits are usually blue shirts, white shorts and blue socks with a gold trim. Wicklow's alternative jersey is white with blue shorts and blue socks.

The Wicklow crest features the roundtower of Glendalough in the foreground surrounded by a large 'W' standing for the name of the county. In the background of the crest is a green mountain, representing the Wicklow Mountains and below is a hand holding a Gaelic football and a hurley and sliotar.

=== Team sponsorship ===
Echelon Data Centres became Wicklow's shirt sponsor ahead of the 2025 season.

Manufacturer	Shirt sponsor	
Manufacturer	Years	Sponsor
O'Neills
O'Neills	1999–2003	Wicklow GoI
O'Neills	2004–2005	White Young Green
O'Neills	2006–2009	Ballymore Group
O'Neills	2010–2013	Brennan Hotels
O'Neills	2014–2016	Arklow Bay Hotel
O'Neills	2017-2018	Joule
O'Neills	2019-2024	Renault
O'Neills	2025-	Echelon Data Centres

== Panel ==
Team as per Wicklow vs Down in the Tailteann Cup final, 11 July 2026.

No.	Player	Position	Club
1	Mark Jackson	Goalkeeper	Baltinglass
2	Tom Moran	Right corner-back	Dunlavin
3	Matt Nolan	Full-back	An Tóchar
4	Malachy Stone	Left corner-back	Barndarrig
5	Darragh Fee	Right half-back	An Tóchar
6	Eoin Murtagh	Centre-back	Dunlavin
7	Gavin Fogarty	Left half-back	An Tóchar
8	Dean Healy (c)	Midfield	St Patrick's
9	Jack Kirwan	Midfield	Baltinglass
10	Jonathan Carlin	Right half-forward	Barndarrig
11	Pádraig O'Toole	Centre-forward	Kiltegan
12	Christopher O'Brien	Left half-forward	Arklow Geraldines Ballymoney
13	Oisín McGraynor	Right corner-forward	Avondale
14	Kevin Quinn	Full-forward	Blessington
15	Eoin Darcy	Left corner-forward	Tinahely

No.	Player	Position	Club
16	Cathal Fitzgerald	Substitute
17	Mark Kenny	Substitute
18	Cian Deering	Substitute
19	Joe Prendergast	Substitute
20	Liam O'Neill	Substitute
21	John Paul Nolan	Substitute
22	Conall Ó Gallchobhair	Substitute
23	Jacques McCall	Substitute
24	Conor Fee	Substitute
25	Seán Murphy	Substitute
26	Cathal Baker	Substitute

^{INJ} Player has had an injury which has affected recent involvement with the county team.
^{RET} Player has since retired from the county team.
^{WD} Player has since withdrawn from the county team due to a non-injury issue.

== Management team ==
Appointed 3 September 2022, extended by a further two seasons in July 2025:

- Manager: Oisín McConville
- Chief coach: Joe Cawley
- Selectors:

== Managerial history ==
This is a list of people who have managed the Wicklow county football team.

Key
*	Interim manager

Dates	Name	Origin
1999–2001	Moses Coffey	?
2001–2003	John O'Leary	
2003–2006	Hugh Kenny	Baltinglass
2006–2011	Mick O'Dwyer	
2011–2014	Harry Murphy	Rathnew
2014–2017	Johnny Magee	
2017–2019	John Evans	
2019–2021	Davy Burke	
2021–2022	Colin Kelly	
2022	Alan Costello*	
2022	Gary Duffy*	?
2022–	Oisín McConville	

== Players ==
=== Notable players ===
- Rory Finn
- Jim Rogers

=== All Stars ===
Wicklow has 1 All Star.

1990: Kevin O'Brien

== Honours ==
=== National ===
- All-Ireland Senior B Football Championship
  - (gold) Winners (1): 1992
- Tommy Murphy Cup
  - (gold) Winners (1): 2007
  - (silver) Runners-up (1): 2008
- Tailteann Cup
  - (gold) Winners (1): 2026
- NFL Division 4
  - (gold) Winners (1): 2012
- All-Ireland Junior Football Championship
  - (gold) Winners (2): 1936, 2002
- All-Ireland Senior Club Football Championship
  - (gold) Winners (1): Baltinglass: 1990
- All-Ireland Vocational Schools Championship (Football)
  - (gold) Winners (3): 1974, 1983, 2006

=== Provincial ===
- Leinster Senior Football Championship
  - (silver) Runners-up (1): 1897
  - (bronze) Semi-finalists (14): Latest in 1995
- O'Byrne_Cup
  - (gold) Winners (4): 1955, 1957, 1986, 1996
- O'Byrne Shield
  - (silver) Runners-up (1): 2024
- Leinster Junior Football Championship
  - (gold) Winners (6): 1906, 1909, 1936, 1949, 1969, 2002
- Leinster Under-21 Football Championship
  - (silver) Runners-up (5): 1967, 1969, 1990, 1991, 2002
- Leinster Minor Football Championship
  - (gold) Winners (1): 1974
  - (silver) Runners-up (3): 1952, 1993, 1997
