= Mick O'Dwyer =

Irish Gaelic football manager and player (1936–2025)

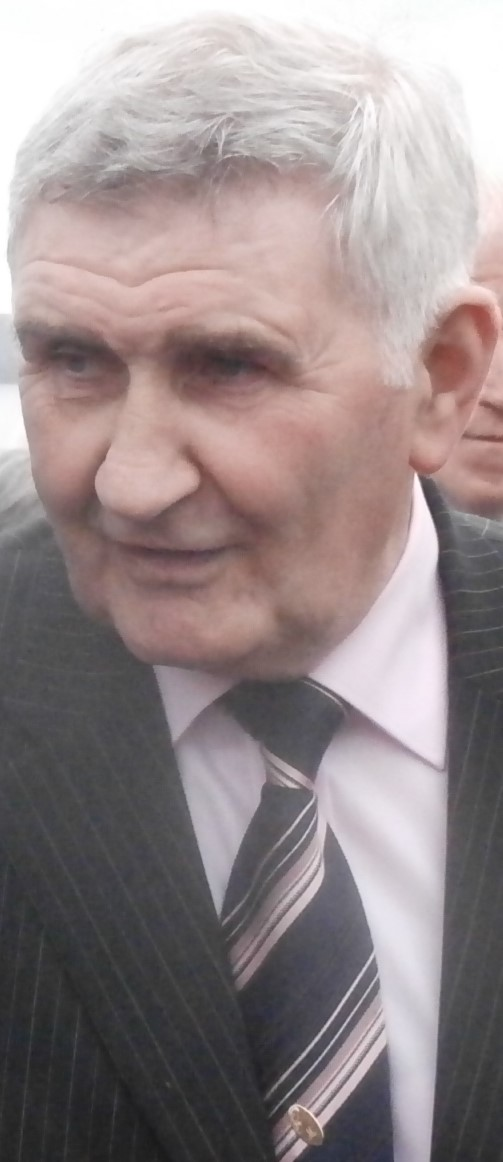
- O'Dwyer in 2012

Personal information
- Native name: Mícheál Ó Duibhir (Irish)
- Nickname: Micko
- Born: 9 June 1936 Waterville, County Kerry, Ireland
- Died: 3 April 2025 (aged 88) Kenmare, County Kerry, Ireland
- Occupation: Hotelier
- Height: 5 ft 11 in (180 cm)

Sport
- Sport: Gaelic football
- Position: Wing-forward/ Wing-back
Clubs
- Years: Club
- Waterville; South Kerry
Club titles
- Kerry titles: 3
Inter-county
Years	County	Apps (scores)
1957–1973	Kerry	48 (6–129)
Inter-county titles
- Munster titles: 12
- All-Irelands: 4
- NFL: 7
- All Stars: 0

Michael O'Dwyer (9 June 1936 – 3 April 2025) was an Irish Gaelic football manager and player. He most famously managed the senior Kerry county team between 1974 and 1989, during which time he became the county's longest-serving manager, and its most successful at winning major titles. O'Dwyer is regarded as one of the greatest managers in the history of the game. He is one of only three men to manage five different counties. Martin Breheny has described him as "the ultimate symbol of the outside manager".

Born in Waterville, County Kerry, O'Dwyer was introduced to Gaelic football by the local national school teacher who organised games between schools in the area. He enjoyed divisional championship success during a thirty-year club career with Waterville. O'Dwyer also won three Kerry County Football Championship medals with South Kerry.

O'Dwyer made his debut on the inter-county scene at the age of seventeen with the Kerry minor team. An All-Ireland MFC runner-up in this grade, O'Dwyer subsequently made his senior debut during the 1956–57 league. He went on to play a key role for Kerry in attack during a very successful era and won four All-Ireland Senior Football Championship (SFC) medals, eleven Munster SFC medals and seven National Football League medals. He was an All-Ireland SFC runner-up on five occasions.

As a member of the Munster inter-provincial team, O'Dwyer won one Railway Cup medal in 1972. Throughout his inter-county career he made 48 championship appearances. O'Dwyer retired from inter-county football following the 1974 championship.

O'Dwyer was appointed manager of the Kerry senior team prior to the start of the 1974–75 National League. He led Kerry through a period of unprecedented provincial and national dominance, winning twenty-two major honours. These include eight All-Ireland SFC titles, including a then record-equalling four-in-a-row between 1978 and 1981, and a three-in-a-row between 1984 and 1986, eleven Munster SFc titles in twelve seasons and three National League titles, including two league–championship doubles. O'Dwyer simultaneously took charge of the Kerry under-21 team, winning three successive All-Ireland Under-21 Football Championship titles. His tenure in charge of the Munster team saw the province claim six Railway Cups.

After ending his fifteen-year managerial tenure with Kerry, O'Dwyer moved to Leinster, where he took charge of Kildare between 1990 and 1994. After making Kildare a competitive footballing force, he was reappointed for a second tenure in 1996. O'Dwyer ended a 42-year provincial famine by securing two Leinster SFC titles, while Kildare also made their first All-Ireland SFC final appearance for seventy years in 1998. In 2002, O'Dwyer moved to Laois, where he helped end a 57-year wait for a Leinster SFC title.

O'Dwyer remained in Leinster after his Laois tenure, embarking on a five-year stint as Wicklow manager in 2006. Wicklow secured the 2007 Tommy Murphy Cup, and O'Dwyer brought them to the last 12 in 2009 for the first time ever. O'Dwyer ended his managerial career with a less successful one-year stint in charge of Clare.

== Early life ==
Mick O'Dwyer was born on 9 June 1936. He was born in the little village of Waterville, County Kerry. He was educated locally at St Finian's national school before later attending Waterville Technical School.

== Playing career ==
=== Minor and junior ===
O'Dwyer first played for Kerry as a member of the minor team in 1954. He made his debut against Waterford; however, he was dropped from the starting fifteen for the subsequent 4–10 to 1–3 Munster MFC final defeat of Cork. On 26 September 1954, O'Dwyer was listed amongst the substitutes once again for the All-Ireland MFC final against Dublin. Two late goals resulted in a 3–3 to 1–8 defeat for Kerry.

After joining the Kerry junior team in 1955, O'Dwyer won a Munster medal in this grade the following year after a 4–10 to 1–4 defeat of Waterford.

=== Senior ===
O'Dwyer is his county's top scorer in National Football League history, finishing his career with 19–313 (370) in that competition. As of 2021, he remained in the top ten all-time scorers in that competition, though he had been passed by numerous players, including Ronan Carolan of Cavan, Mattie Forde of Wexford, Steven McDonnell of Armagh, Conor McManus of Monaghan, Brian Stafford of Meath and David Tubridy of Clare.

==== Beginnings ====
O'Dwyer made his senior debut for Kerry in a 0–9 to 0–6 National Football League defeat of Carlow on 21 October 1956. He received his first championship start on 2 June 1957, in an infamous and shock 2–5 to 0–10 defeat by Waterford.

In 1958, O'Dwyer was named at right wing-back in his first provincial decider. A 2–7 to 0–3 drubbing of old rivals Cork gave him his first Munster SFC medal.

==== Early All-Ireland successes ====
O'Dwyer experienced further success in 1959 as Kerry secured the league title. The 2–8 to 1–8 defeat of Derry gave him his first league medal. O'Dwyer later added a second Munster SFC medal to his collection, following a 2–15 to 2–8 defeat of Cork. On 27 September 1959, Kerry faced Galway in the All-Ireland SFC decider. Every aspect of that game seemed to go Kerry's way. A punched Tom Long ball was forced into the net by Dan McAuliffe for Kerry's opening goal. McAuliffe struck again when goalkeeper Jimmy Farrell dropped the ball accidentally in the goalmouth, while substitute Garry McMahon slipped as he sent the third into the net in the final few minutes. A 3–7 to 1–4 scoreline gave Kerry the title, and gave O'Dwyer his first All-Ireland SFC medal.

Kerry made it three-in-a-row in Munster in 1960. The 3–15 to 0–8 defeat of Waterford gave O'Dwyer his third Munster SFC medal. A second consecutive All-Ireland SFC final appearance quickly followed on 11 September 1960, with Down providing the opposition. The game was played on an even keel for much of the first-half; however, an important incident turned the game in the Ulster men's favour eleven minutes after the interval. Kevin Mussen's line ball found Dan McCartan, who sent in a high forty-yard lob, which Kerry goalkeeper Johnny Culloty dropped over the goal-line. Two minutes later Paddy Doherty was pulled down in the square. He converted the subsequent penalty, which put Down six points up. An historic final score of 2–10 to 0–8 resulted in a defeat for O'Dwyer's side, while the Sam Maguire Cup crossed the border into Northern Ireland for the first time.

Kerry reached the final of the 1960–61 National League, with, for the second time in three years, Derry as the opponent. The northerners put up little opposition as Kerry secured a 4–16 to 1–5 victory. It was O'Dwyer's second National League medal. He later collected a fourth successive Munster SFC medal, following a 2–13 to 1–4 replay defeat of Cork.

O'Dwyer won a fifth successive provincial title in 1962 following yet another 4–8 to 0–4 trouncing of Cork. On 23 September 1962, Kerry faced Roscommon in what has been described as possibly the worst championship decider of them all. Garry McMahon went into the history books by scoring Kerry's first goal after just thirty-five seconds. Kerry fielded the resultant kick-out and Timmy O'Sullivan got the first of Kerry's twelve points of the day. A Don Feeley penalty did not lift Roscommon, the team falling to Kerry by a scoreline of 1–12 to 1–6. It was O'Dwyer's second All-Ireland SFC medal.

==== All-Ireland defeats ====
A largely facile defeat by 1–18 to 1–10 of New York secured the 1962–63 National League title for Kerry. It was O'Dwyer's third winners' medal in the secondary competition. He later added a sixth Munster SFC medal to his collection, after a 1–18 to 3–7 defeat of Cork.

In the summer of 1964, O'Dwyer's career seemed at an end when he broke both his legs. The first break occurred during a challenge match in Sneem, when a player fell on him. No sooner was he out of plaster than his other leg was broken in a county league game. It was a mark of his tenacity that he was named at centre-forward for Kerry's All-Ireland SFC final meeting with Galway on 27 September 1964. The game turned into a battle between Mick O'Connell and Cyril Dunne. The former scored seven of Kerry's points, while the latter converted nine. After Galway took a four-point lead in the opening ten minutes they never looked back. A full-time score of 0–15 to 0–10 resulted in a defeat for O'Dwyer's side.

After a one-year absence, O'Dwyer won a seventh Munster SFC medal in 1965, defeating Limerick by 2–16 to 2–7. On 26 September 1965, Kerry faced Galway in a second consecutive All-Ireland SFC final. Galway raced out of the starting blocks once again; however, the game was not without incident. Kerry's Derry O'Shea and Galway's John Donnellan were sent-off. Major scoring threat Mick O'Connell was curtailed; however, Kerry launched a great comeback. In the end the 0–12 to 0–9 scoreline resulted in Galway retaining the championship for the second year in-a-row. Following this defeat, O'Dwyer decided to retire from inter-county football.

==== Successful return ====
After a two-year absence from the Kerry team, O'Dwyer ended his retirement and returned to the starting fifteen in 1968. A 1–21 to 3–8 defeat of reigning champions Cork gave him an eighth Munster SFC medal. Kerry faced old rivals Down in the All-Ireland SFC final on 22 September 1968. Down player Seán O'Neill got the inside of his boot to a rebounding ball to score a goal after six minutes. A Brendan Lynch goal for Kerry in the final minute was little more than a consolation, as Down won the game by 2–12 to 1–13.

In 1969, O'Dwyer won a fourth National League medal following an aggregate 2–33 to 2–24 defeat of New York. He later won a ninth Munster SFC medal, as Kerry accounted for old rivals Cork by a scoreline of 0–16 to 1–4. On 14 September 1969, Kerry faced Offaly in what was a first championship meeting between the two sides. Kerry goalkeeper Johnny Culloty made two great saves in the first half and another straight after the interval. Kerry held onto a three-point lead from the interval until the final whistle and a 0–10 to 0–7 victory gave O'Dwyer a third All-Ireland SFC medal. He was later named Texaco Footballer of the Year.

Kerry made it three-in-a-row in Munster in 1970, with O'Dwyer collecting his tenth provincial medal following a 2–22 to 2–9 defeat of Cork. On 27 September 1970, Kerry faced Meath in the first eighty-minute All-Ireland SFC final. O'Dwyer's side took an eight-point lead; however, this was cut back to just three by Meath. Din Joe Crowley's "goal of the century" four minutes from the end sealed a 2–19 to 0–18 victory and a fourth All-Ireland SFC medal for O'Dwyer. In winning this title O'Dwyer finished the season as top scorer, as well as joining a unique group of players to win All-Ireland SFC medals in each of three decades.

==== Decline ====
In 1971, Kerry qualified for the National League final once again. Mayo provided the opposition; however, a 0–10 to 0–8 victory gave O'Dwyer a fifth National League medal.

Kerry dominated the secondary competition once again in 1972, with O'Dwyer securing a sixth National League medal following a 2–11 to 1–9 defeat of Mayo. For the seventh year in succession, Kerry faced reigning champions Cork in the subsequent Munster SFC final. A 2–21 to 2–15 victory gave O'Dwyer his eleventh and final Munster SFC medal as a player. Offaly, a team which had won its first ever All-Ireland SFC title the previous year, provided the opposition in the subsequent All-Ireland SFC final on 24 September 1972. Noel Cooney of Offaly and Brendan Lynch of Kerry exchanged goals during the game, while Offaly captain Tony McTague converted six points for his side. At the full-time whistle, both sides were level, 1–13 apiece. In the drawn game (four weeks later on 15 October 1972), both sides exchanged tit-for-tat scorers; however, Offaly broke Kerry's defence after forty-eight minutes when Pat Fenning's long speculative ball hopped over the line without anyone touching it. The 1–19 to 0–13 victory for Offaly turned out to be Kerry's biggest ever defeat in an All-Ireland SFC final.

In 1973, Kerry retained their National League title for a third successive year. The 2–12 to 0–14 defeat of Offaly gave 37-year-old O'Dwyer his seventh National League medal. Kerry later suffered a biggest ever defeat in a provincial decider when Cork accounted for O'Dwyer's side by 5–12 to 1–15.

O'Dwyer remained with the Kerry team during the 1973–74 National League season, albeit making just one appearance in a fourth round defeat by Cork. He retired from inter-county football following a challenge game against Sligo prior to the start of the championship.

== Managerial career ==
Mick O'Dwyer
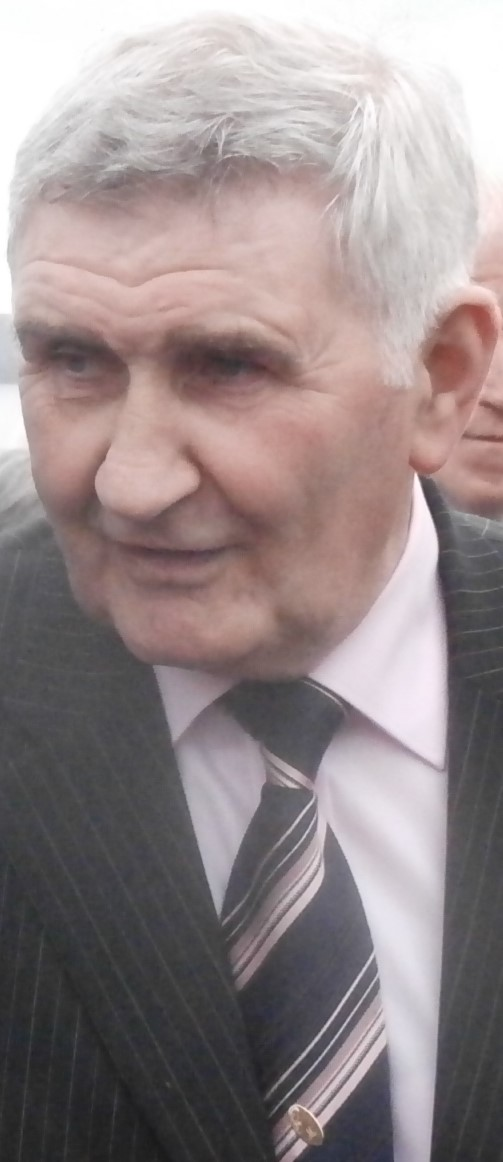

Sport
Club management
- Years: Club
- 1994–1998: Waterville
	3	—	—
Inter-county management
- Years: Team
- 1975–1989 1991–1994 1998–2002 2003–2006 2006–2011 2013: Kerry; Kildare; Kildare; Laois; Wicklow; Clare
Inter-county titles as manager
County	League	Province	All-Ireland
Kerry Kildare Laois	8 — —	11; 2; 1	11; 2; 1

=== Kerry ===
O'Dwyer retired as a player in 1974 and was appointed manager of the Kerry team in 1975. During his fifteen years as manager O'Dwyer's Kerry teams played in ten All-Ireland SFC finals, winning eight of them. During this period as manager, five of his players won eight All-Ireland SFC medals. Four of his players won 8 Texaco Footballer of the Year Awards and overall his players won 71 All Stars Awards. O'Dwyer retired as Kerry manager in 1989 but moved onto other teams. His management career with Kerry spanned the years 1975 through 1989, a period in which Kerry played 55 games, winning 43 of them, losing 7 of them and drawing the other 5.

O'Dwyer was also credited with beginning "unsanctioned commercialism" within Gaelic games when he had the Kerry team arrived at the 1982 Munster Senior Football Championship final in Adidas-branded sportswear in exchange for £10,000 that went towards a team holiday fund. Then, on the morning of the 1985 All-Ireland Senior Football Championship final, O'Dwyer and his Kerry players featured in an advertisement for Bendix washing machines, with the line "Only Bendix could whitewash this lot".

=== Kildare ===
As manager of the Kildare county team in 1998, O'Dwyer led them to a Leinster SFC title and the 1998 All-Ireland Senior Football Championship final; however, Galway defeated his team by four points in that game. His management career with Kildare lasted two periods, the first was 1991–1994 and the second was 1997–2002. He managed the county in 33 games, with 16 wins, 11 losses and six draws. In 1998, he managed the team to a first Leinster SFC title in 42 years.

=== Laois ===
At the age of 66, O'Dwyer took over as manager of the Laois county team, appointed for a two-year term in 2002, one month after departing Kildare.

He led Laois to Leinster SFC finals in 2003 and 2004, winning the former. Laois also reached the Leinster SFC final under O'Dwyer in both the 2005 and 2006 seasons. At the beginning of the 2006 SFC, O'Dwyer announced that 2006 would be his last season with Laois; however, he did not rule out moving as manager to another team. It was first revealed on 6 September 2006 that O'Dwyer would not be staying on at Laois for another season, having made his final appearance as Laois manager against Kerry in the All-Ireland SFC semi-finals. His Laois career between 2003 and 2006, included 19 games, which finished as 11 wins, five losses and three draws.

County chairman Dick Miller confirmed O'Dwyer had left.

=== Wicklow ===
In 2006, O'Dwyer took charge of the Wicklow county team. He made his debut as Wicklow manager with a win against Carlow in the 2007 O'Byrne Cup.

On 5 July 2009, Wicklow defeated Fermanagh by a scoreline of 0–17 to 1–11. This marked a milestone for O'Dwyer as it meant he had defeated every other county during his terms as manager of different teams.

On 16 July 2011, O'Dwyer announced the end of his tenure as Wicklow manager following defeat to Armagh in Round 3 of the 2011 All-Ireland SFC qualifiers.

=== Clare ===
On 2 November 2012, it was confirmed that O'Dwyer had been ratified as manager of the Clare county team for the 2013 season.

He stepped down in the summer of 2013 due to an unsuccessful year.

In January 2014, aged 77, he confirmed that he had retired as an inter-county manager, though he was open to the possibility of an advisory role depending on the offer.

== Personal life and death ==
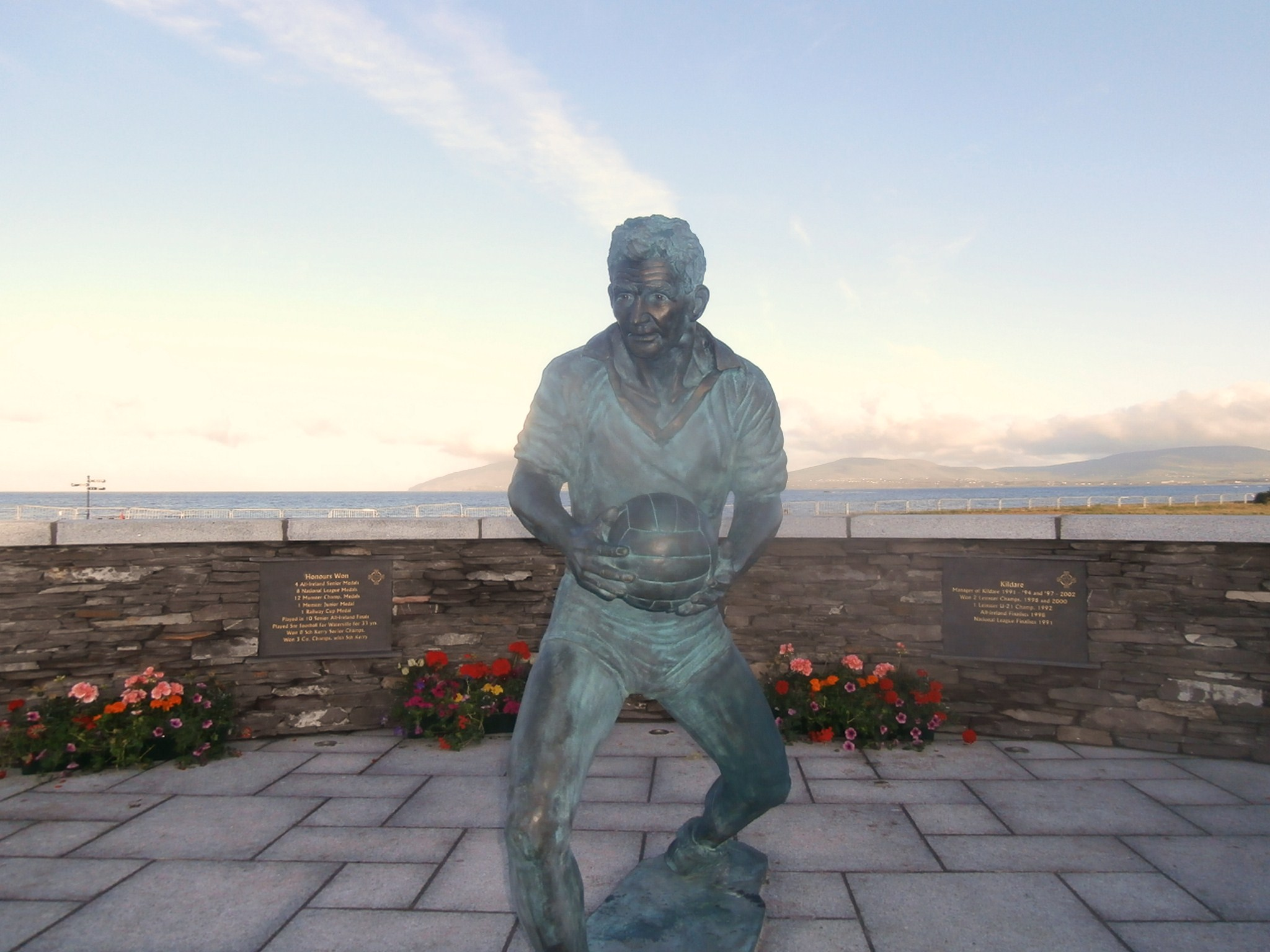
Mick O'Dwyer statue in Waterville

O'Dwyer worked as a hotelier, as well as running an undertaker service. His son, Karl, played inter-county football for both Kildare and Kerry.

O'Dwyer died at Kenmare Community Hospital on 3 April 2025, at the age of 88.

A tribute was paid to him before a rugby game at the Stade Marcel-Deflandre. A minute's silence was held in New York.

A moment of silence happened before the Cork–Limerick Munster SFC quarter-final game on 5 April 2025.

== Honours ==
=== As player ===
==== Kerry ====
- All-Ireland Senior Football Championship (4): 1959, 1962, 1969, 1970
- Munster Senior Football Championship (12): 1958, 1959, 1960, 1961, 1962, 1963, 1964 (sub), 1965, 1968, 1969, 1970, 1972
  - Runner-up (4): 1956, 1971, 1973, 1974
- National Football League: (8) ?
- Munster Junior Football Championship (1): 1956

==== Munster ====
- Railway Cup (1): ?

==== Waterville ====
- Kerry Senior Football Championship finals as player-coach (3): ?

=== As manager ===
==== Kerry ====
- All-Ireland Senior Football Championship (8): 1975, 1978, 1979, 1980, 1981, 1984, 1985, 1986
  - Runner-up (2): 1976, 1982
- Munster Senior Football Championship (11): 1975, 1976, 1977, 1978, 1979, 1980, 1981, 1982, 1984, 1985, 1986
  - Runner-up (4): 1983, 1987, 1988, 1989

==== Kildare ====
- Leinster Senior Football Championship (2): 1998, 2000

==== Laois ====
- Leinster Senior Football Championship (1): 2003

==== Munster ====
- Railway Cup (6): ?

==== Waterville ====
- Kerry Senior Football Championship finals as player–coach (3): ?

== See also ==
- Micko, a documentary

Sporting positions
Preceded by Johnny Culloty	Kerry Senior Football Manager; 1974–1989	Succeeded by Mickey 'Ned' O'Sullivan
Preceded by Pat Fitzgerald	Kildare Senior Football Manager; 1990–1994	Succeeded by Dermot Earley Snr
Preceded by Dermot Earley Snr	Kildare Senior Football Manager; 1997–2002	Succeeded by Pádraig Nolan
Preceded by Colm Browne	Laois Senior Football Manager; 2002–2006	Succeeded by Liam Kearns
Preceded by Hugh Kenny	Wicklow Senior Football Manager; 2006–2011	Succeeded by Harry Murphy
Preceded by Micheál McDermott	Clare Senior Football Manager; 2012–2013	Succeeded by Colm Collins

Awards and achievements
Preceded by Seán O'Neill (Down)	Texaco Footballer of the Year; 1969	Succeeded by Tom Prendergast (Kerry)
Preceded by Kevin Heffernan	All-Ireland SFC winning manager 1975	Succeeded by Kevin Heffernan
Preceded by Tony Hanahoe	All-Ireland SFC winning manager 1978 – 1981	Succeeded by Eugene McGee
Preceded by Kevin Heffernan	All-Ireland SFC winning manager 1984 – 1986	Succeeded by Seán Boylan
