= An Tóchar GAA =

Irish Gaelic football club

An Tóchar
- Founded: 1885
- County: Wicklow
- Colours: Sky Blue and Navy
- Grounds: Togher More, Roundwood
- Coordinates: 53.05922°N 6.22997°W

Playing kits
Standard colours

Senior Club Championships
	All Ireland	Leinster champions	Wicklow champions
Football:	-	-	3
Ladies' football:	–	–	8

An Tóchar (Irish pronunciation: [ənˠ ˈt̪ˠoːxəɾˠ]) is a Gaelic football and ladies' Gaelic football club based in Roundwood, County Wicklow, Ireland.

== History ==
Tóchar GAA club was founded on 8 August 1885 by Laurence Murphy of Togher House. Their first game was in March 1886 against Ashford. In 1886, they took part in a tournament at Avondale House, where six Wicklow teams played six Wexford teams; Tochar defeated Rosslare 0-4 to 0-0.

The club declined and was replaced by a new team named Roundwood, who won the Wicklow Senior Football Championship in 1933. Later a club called Ballinastoe was dominant in the area; the two teams merged to form Ballinastoe/Roundwood, reviving the name An Tóchar in 1981. In 1995, An Tóchar won the Wicklow Senior Football Championship and advanced to the final of the Leinster Senior Club Football Championship, losing to Éire Óg, Carlow after a replay.

The ladies' team has won eight county titles, and twice reached the final of the Leinster Ladies' Senior Club Football Championship.

== Honours ==
=== Gaelic football ===
- Leinster Junior Club Football Championship (1): 2001
- Wicklow Senior Football Championship (3): 1933, 1995, 2026
- Wicklow Intermediate Football Championship (3): 1931 (as Roundwood), 1951 (as Roundwood), 2021
- Wicklow Junior Football Championship (4): 1950 (as Roundwood), 1987, 2001, 2019

=== Ladies' football ===
- Wicklow Senior Ladies' Football Championship (8): 1991, 1994, 1995, 1996, 1997, 1998, 1999, 2002

== Notable players ==
- Mike Hassett (also played with Kerry and Killorglin)
