= Newtown GAA =

Gaelic games club in County Wicklow, Ireland

- Baile úi gCearnaigh
- Founded: 1887
- County: Wicklow
- Nickname: The Magpies
- Colours: Black and White
- Grounds: Ballinahinch

Playing kits
Standard colours

Newtown G.A.A Club is a G.A.A. club to the north east of Newtownmountkennedy, in Ballinahinch in County Wicklow. The club is one of the oldest clubs in the country, being founded in 1887. The club currently has two adult teams, one contesting the Senior League and Championship, one contesting the Junior B League and Championship. There are also numerous underage teams, ranging from Minor (U-18) down to "Super Sevens" (U-8 and younger).

== History ==
Newtown G.A.A Club was founded in 1887. For a time in these early years they were linked with Rathnew and Ashford, but by and large they were on their own. Kiltimon, very close to Newtown, was also very active in the early days, and will be noted in the list of clubs for 1886. The first mention of Newtown was found on the 13 February 1887 when they played Wicklow in Newtown. Newtown was beaten by Ashford 0-5 to 0-1 on 8 May 1887. At this point they were known as O’Connell’s.

Newtown have won two Wicklow Senior Football Championships, the first in 1964 and the second in 1975.

The Newtown GAA Senior Football team was formerly sponsored by Paul McShane. The McShane family has a long standing connection to the club. The Newtown GAA Senior Football team is now sponsored by Absolute47, a Boston-based, space-leasing company. The Chief executive officer of Absolute47 is Liam Clancy, a native of Newtownmountkennedy.

== Honours ==
- Wicklow Senior Football Championships: (2) 1964, 1975.
- Keating Cup - Wicklow Senior B Football Championship: (1) 2010.
- Wicklow Intermediate Football Championship: (1) 2003.
- Wicklow Minor Football Championship: (1) 2000.
