= Hollywood GAA =

Gaelic games club in County Wicklow, Ireland

- Seamróga Cillín Caoimhín
- Founded: 1886
- County: Wicklow
- Nickname: The Village/The Wood
- Colours: Green and Gold
- Coordinates: 53°05′25.22″N 6°36′39.99″W

Playing kits
Standard colours

Hollywood GAA is a Gaelic football club in Hollywood, County Wicklow, Ireland. The club competes in Wicklow GAA competitions.

== History ==
Hollywood GAA club was founded shortly after the founding of the Gaelic Athletic Association in 1884, in the village of Hollywood, County Wicklow. The club was formerly known as Hollywood Shamrocks. In recent years, the club have undertaken development of the club, purchasing land at Rathattin, Hollywood, County Wicklow, and building dressing rooms, offices, and sports hall, at the yet-unnamed grounds.

== Achievements ==
Hollywood GAA club compete in Wicklow Senior Football Championship at senior level, the principal competition for Gaelic football in County Wicklow. A second adult team competes at the Junior A level. Children from the club, play with St. Kevins GAA club up to the age of u-18(minor), in a joint venture with neighbours, Valleymount GAA Club.

Hollywood have competed in the Wicklow Senior Football Championship Final on few occasions. In the year 2000 and in 1976, Hollywood did in fact reach the championship final, however, on both occasions they lost out by one single point, in 1976, to Baltinglass GAA club, by a score of 0-05 (5 points) to 0-04 (4 points), and in 2000, to Rathnew GAA club. The records show that Hollywood also competed in the final in 1931 and 1939, but were unsuccessful on each occasion.
