= Tinahely GAA =

Irish Gaelic football club

Tinahely
- Tigh na hÉille
- Founded: 1886
- County: Wicklow
- Colours: Red and White
- Grounds: Páirc Naomh Caoimhín, School Road, Tinahely
- Coordinates: 52.798808°N 6.457494°W

Playing kits
Standard colours

Senior Club Championships
	All Ireland	Leinster champions	Wicklow champions
Football:	-	-	4

Tinahely Gaelic Athletic Association is a Gaelic football and ladies' Gaelic football club based in Tinahely, County Wicklow, Ireland.

== History ==
GAA activity in Tinahely is first recorded in 1886. The club was revived as St. Patricks in 1911 and won their first senior county title in 1917. The club lapsed out of existence around 1924, being revived in 1961, which is the date on the current club crest.

Tinahely won the county championship in 1984 and advanced to the final of the Leinster Senior Club Football Championship, losing to St Vincents.

Tinahely ended the 40 years drought and won the county championship in 2024 beating Baltinglass in the final.

== Honours ==
=== Gaelic football ===
- Wicklow Senior Football Championship (4): 1917, 1919, 1984, 2024
- Wicklow Intermediate Football Championship (2): 2005, 2018
- Wicklow Junior Football Championship (1): 1969

== Notable people ==
- Eoin Darcy
- Luke O'Toole, Secretary-General of the Gaelic Athletic Association 1901–29
