= Baltinglass GAA =

Gaelic sports club in County Wicklow, Ireland

Baltinglass GAA Club
- Bealach Chonglais
- Founded: 1887
- County: Wicklow
- Nickname: Balto, The Slaney Siders
- Colours: White and Green
- Grounds: Newtownsaunders, Baltinglass
- Coordinates: 52°55′54.39″N 6°41′01.55″W

Playing kits
Standard colours

Senior Club Championships
	All Ireland	Leinster champions	Wicklow champions
Football:	1	1	24
Hurling:	-	-	1

Baltinglass GAA Club is a Gaelic Athletic Association club based in Baltinglass, County Wicklow, Ireland. The main sport is Gaelic football. The club participates in male and female competitions from under 8 through to Adult ages run by the Wicklow GAA county board. The club's motto is 'Belief, Attitude, Loyalty, Trust, & Optimism', or BALTO for short.

== History ==
Founded in 1887, First the club played under the name of Maurice Davins. The first success came in 1913 as Baltinglass Shamrocks, they won the delayed 1912 Wicklow Junior title. 1927 saw a Wicklow Senior Hurling title. In 1934 a meeting was held to re-establish the football club.

A minor title in 1940 was followed by a Junior title in 1943 and with this it was promoted to Intermediate ranks. More minor titles were won 1952, 53, 54 & 55. The current pitch was bought in 1957, but was not officially opened until the 1980s.

1958 saw Baltinglass win the Wicklow Senior title for the first time. Four titles in the sixties, four in the seventies, six in the eighties and five in the nineties. This included an eight in a row from 1987 to 1994. A Leinster title was won in 1989 and the All-Ireland in 1990. In total the club has won 24 Wicklow Senior Football titles the most recent in 2025.

The club has a main pitch with a covered seated stand and a training pitch, both of which are floodlit.

== Honours ==
- All-Ireland Senior Club Football Championships: (1) 1989–90
- Leinster Senior Club Football Championships: (1) 1989
- Wicklow Senior Football Championships: (24) 1958, 1963, 1965, 1966, 1967, 1971, 1972, 1976, 1979, 1980, 1982, 1985, 1987, 1988, 1989, 1990, 1991, 1992, 1993, 1994, 2007, 2016, 2020, 2025
- Wicklow Senior Hurling Championship: (1) 1927

== Notable players ==
- John Flynn
- Hugh Kenny
- Kevin O'Brien
