= Blessington GAA =

Irish Gaelic football club

Blessington
- Cros Baile Coimín
- Founded: 1909
- County: Wicklow
- Colours: Blue and White
- Grounds: Blessington GAA Ground, Blessington
- Coordinates: 53°10′48″N 6°32′30″W

Playing kits
Standard colours

Senior Club Championships
	All Ireland	Leinster champions	Wicklow champions
Football:	-	-	4

Blessington Gaelic Athletic Association is a Gaelic football, hurling, camogie and ladies' Gaelic football club based in Blessington, County Wicklow, Ireland.

== History ==
The club was founded in 1909, initially playing its games in the Burgage near to the cemetery. The club crest depicts St. Mark's Cross, a high cross was moved to Burgage cemetery when its original home was flooded by the creation of Poulaphouca Reservoir. Blessington GAA won their first Wicklow Senior Football Championship in 1915.

Blessington won both junior and intermediate county titles in 1979, following up that success with a second senior title in 1983.

Blessington moved to new grounds purchased from the O'Leary family in 2007. They won their third senior title in 2021.

== Honours ==
=== Gaelic football ===
- Wicklow Senior Football Championship (3): 1915, 1983, 2021, 2023
- Wicklow Intermediate Football Championship (5): 1928, 1936, 1946, 1949, 1979
- Wicklow Junior Football Championship (5): 1931, 1974, 1979, 2000, 2002

== Notable members ==
- Jack Boothman (GAA President)
- Raymond Daniels
- Billy Gobbett (handballer)
- Michael McLoughlin
- Vincent Flood
