= Rathnew GAA =

Gaelic games club in County Wicklow, Ireland

- Rathnew GAA
- Founded: 1885
- County: Wicklow
- Colours: Red and green

Playing kits
Standard colours

Senior Club Championships
	All Ireland	Leinster champions	Wicklow champions
Football:	0	1	34
Hurling:	0	0	11

Rathnew GAA is a Gaelic football club in Rathnew, County Wicklow, Ireland.

== History ==
As of 2017, Rathnew's coach was Harry Murphy.

== Panel ==
- Peter Dignam
- Paul Merrigan
- Damien Power
- Jamie Snell
- JT Moorehouse
- Ross O'Brien
- John Manley
- James Stafford
- Theo Smyth
- Eddie Doyle (c)
- Jody Merrigan
- Danny Staunton
- Nicky Mernagh
- Mark Doyle
- Leighton Glynn
- Stephen Byrne
- Enan Glynn
- Graham Merrigan
- Chris Healy
- Warren Kavanagh

== Notable players ==
- Harry Murphy

== Honours ==
- Leinster Senior Club Football Championships: (1)
  - 2001
- Wicklow Senior Football Championships: (34)
  - 1893, 1896, 1897, 1902, 1904, 1905, 1906, 1909, 1910, 1911, 1921, 1924, 1928, 1932, 1941, 1942, 1943, 1970, 1978, 1996, 1997, 1998, 1999, 2000, 2001, 2002, 2003, 2005, 2009, 2010, 2013, 2014, 2015 & 2017.
- Wicklow Senior Hurling Championships: (11)
  - 1906, 1911, 1913, 1925, 1929, 1932, 1933, 1934, 1937, 1939, 1950
