= Wicklow Senior Football Championship =

Annual Gaelic football competition

- Irish: Craobh Sinsear Peile Cill Mhantáin
- Founded: 1887
- Title holders: An Tochar (3rd title)
- Most titles: Rathnew (34 titles)
- Sponsors: Boom & Platform Hire

The Wicklow Senior Football Championship is an annual Gaelic Athletic Association competition organised by Wicklow GAA between the top Gaelic football clubs in County Wicklow, Ireland. The winner of the Wicklow Championship qualifies to represent their county in the Leinster Senior Club Football Championship, the winner of which progresses to the All-Ireland Senior Club Football Championship.

The current (2026) champions are An Tochar(3rd title), who defeated Blessington , at the county grounds in Aughrim.

== Top winners ==
- 1888 title shared by Annacurra & Clara

#	Club	Wins	Years won
1	Rathnew	34	1893, 1896, 1897, 1902, 1904, 1905, 1906, 1909, 1910, 1911, 1921, 1924, 1928, 1932, 1941, 1942, 1943, 1970, 1978, 1996, 1997, 1998, 1999, 2000, 2001, 2002, 2003, 2005, 2009, 2010, 2013, 2014, 2015, 2017
2	Baltinglass	24	1958, 1963, 1965, 1966, 1967, 1971, 1972, 1976, 1979, 1980, 1982, 1985, 1987, 1988, 1989, 1990, 1991, 1992, 1993, 1994, 2007, 2016, 2020, 2025
3	St Patrick's	15	1950, 1952, 1953, 1955, 1956, 1959, 1960, 1961, 1969, 2004, 2006, 2012, 2018, 2019, 2022
4	Annacurra	9	1887, 1888, 1889, 1892, 1913, 1920, 1925, 1926, 1931
5	Donard/Glen	6	1937, 1940, 1944, 1947, 1951, 1957
6	Tinahely	4	1917, 1919, 1984, 2024
6	Blessington	4	1915, 1983, 2021, 2023
6	Carnew Emmets	4	1916, 1927, 1945, 1973
9	Kilcoole	3	1929, 1939, 1954
9	Ballinacor	3	1946, 1948, 1949
9	An Tóchar, Roundwood	3	1933, 1995, 2026
12	Kiltegan	2	1986, 2008
12	Dunlavin	2	1977, 1981
12	Newtown	2	1964, 1975
12	Kilbride	2	1962, 1968
12	Rathdangan	2	1930, 1936
12	Bray Emmets	2	1934, 1935
18	St Mary's (Shillelagh & Coolkenno)	1	2011
18	Ashford	1	1974
18	Granabeg	1	1923
18	Avondale	1	1908
18	Wicklow	1	1890
18	Clara	1	1888

== Roll of honour ==
Year	Winner	Score	Opponent	Score
2026	An Tóchar	0-21	Blessington	1-07
2025	Baltinglass	1-20	Carnew Emmets	0-15
2024	Tinahely	0-16	Baltinglass	2-09
2023	Blessington	1-09, 0-11 (R)	Rathnew	1-09, 1-06 (R)
2022	St Patrick's	1-10	Baltinglass	1-08
2021	Blessington	0-11	Baltinglass	0-10
2020	Baltinglass	1-13	Tinahely	1-09
2019	St Patrick's	0-09	Arklow Geraldines Ballymoney	0-07
2018 (replay)	St Patrick's	1-10 (R 0-10)	Rathnew	0-13 (R 0-08)
2017	Rathnew	3-08	Blessington	0-12
2016	Baltinglass	1-14	St Patrick's	1-09
2015	Rathnew	3-06	St Patrick's	0-09
2014	Rathnew	1-08	St Patrick's	0-07
2013	Rathnew	3-09	Baltinglass	1-14
2012	St Patrick's	1-12	Baltinglass	0-14
2011	St Mary's (Shillelagh/Coolkenno)	2-05	Rathnew	0-10
2010	Rathnew	2-08	Baltinglass	0-06
2009	Rathnew	0-14	St Patrick's	1-08
2008	Kiltegan	0-09	St Patrick's	1-05
2007	Baltinglass	0-12 (R 0-08)	Rathnew	1-09 (R 0-06)
2006	St Patrick's	1-10	Kiltegan	0-10
2005	Rathnew	0-15	Shillelagh	1-11
2004	St Patrick's	3-06	Rathnew	1-08
2003	Rathnew	0-08 (R 0-11)	Bray Emmets	1-05 (R 0-06)
2002	Rathnew	1-08	Baltinglass	1-03
2001	Rathnew	1-08	An Tóchar	1-05
2000	Rathnew	0-12	Hollywood	0-11
1999	Rathnew	0-09	An Tóchar	0-08
1998	Rathnew		Kiltegan	
1997	Rathnew		Dunlavin	
1996	Rathnew		Baltinglass	
1995	An Tóchar		Baltinglass	
1994	Baltinglass		Rathnew	
1993	Baltinglass		East District	
1992	Baltinglass		An Tóchar	
1991	Baltinglass		St Patrick's	
1990	Baltinglass		Annacurra	
1989	Baltinglass		St Patrick's	
1988	Baltinglass		Blessington	
1987	Baltinglass		St Patrick's	
1986	Kiltegan		St Patrick's	
1985	Baltinglass		Blessington	
1984	Tinahely	1-15	Valleymount	2-02
1983	Blessington		Baltinglass	
1982	Baltinglass		Tinahely	
1981	Dunlavin		Tinahely	
1980	Baltinglass		Blessington	
1979	Baltinglass		Rathnew	
1978	Rathnew		Kiltegan	
1977	Dunlavin		St Patrick's	
1976	Baltinglass		Hollywood	
1975	Newtownmountkennedy		Rathnew	
1974	Ashford	4-04	Carnew Emmets	1-08
1973	Carnew Emmets		Rathnew	
1972	Baltinglass		Dunlavin	
1971	Baltinglass		Carnew Emmets	
1970	Rathnew		Carnew Emmets	
1969	St Patrick's	3-04	Ashford	1-07
1968	Kilbride		Baltinglass	
1967	Baltinglass		Newtownmountkennedy	
1966	Baltinglass		St Patrick's	
1965	Baltinglass		St Patrick's	
1964	Newtownmountkennedy		Baltinglass	
1963	Baltinglass		Arklow Geraldines	
1962	Kilbride		Laragh	
1961	St Patrick's		Kilcoole	
1960	St Patrick's		Laragh	
1959	St Patrick's		Rathnew	
1958	Baltinglass	2-06	St Patrick's	1-04
1957	Donard	2-06	Kilcoole	2-04
1956	St Patrick's	1-07 (R 3-03)	Baltinglass	1-07 (R 1-03)
1955	St Patrick's	1-12	Annacurra	2-04
1954	Kilcoole	1-05	St Patrick's	1-04
1953	St Patrick's	0-09	Rathnew	0-04
1952	St Patrick's	1-07	Donard	0-04
1951	Donard	1-03*	Carnew Emmets	2-02*
1950	St Patrick's	1-06	Donard	1-04
1949	Ballinacor		St Patrick's	
1948	Ballinacor		Donard	
1947	Donard		Ballinacor	
1946	Ballinacor		Donard	
1945	Carnew Emmets		Rathnew	
1944	Donard		Ashford	
1943	Rathnew		Donard	
1942	Rathnew		Blessington	
1941	Rathnew		Donard	
1940	Donard		Carnew Emmets	
1939	Kilcoole		Hollywood	
1938	No Championship			
1937	Donard		Rathnew	
1936	Rathdangan		Donard	
1935	Bray Emmets	5-07	Donard	4-06
1934	Bray Emmets		Ballymanus	
1933	Roundwood		Blessington	
1932	Rathnew		Annacurra	
1931	Annacurra	2-02 (R 0-4*)	Hollywood	1-01 (R 1-0*)
1930	Rathdangan	2-05	Rathnew	1-01
1929	Kilcoole	2-02	Carnew Emmets	2-01
1928	Rathnew	3-05	Rathdangan	2-00
1927	Carnew		Granabeg	
1926	Annacurra		Kilcoole	
1925	Annacurra		Rathnew	
1924	Rathnew		Annacurra	
1923	Granabeg		St Patrick's	
1922	No Championship			
1921	Rathnew			
1920	Annacurra			
1919	Tinahely	1-03	Baltinglass	1-00
1918	No Championship			
1917	Tinahely		Blessington	
1916	Carnew Emmets			
1915	Blessington			
1914	No Championship			
1913	Annacurra			
1912	No Championship			
1911	Rathnew			
1910	Rathnew			
1909	Rathnew			
1908	Avondale			
1907	No Championship			
1906	Rathnew			
1905	Rathnew	4-11	Laragh	0-01
1904	Rathnew			
1903	No Championship			
1902	Rathnew			
1901	No Championship			
1900	No Championship			
1899	No Championship			
1898	No Championship			
1897	Rathnew			
1896	Rathnew			
1895	No Championship			
1894	No Championship			
1893	Rathnew			
1892	Annacurra			
1891	No Championship			
1890	Wicklow			
1889	Annacurra	1-02	Ballyknockan '98s	1-01
1888	Annacurra/Clara			
1887	Annacurra			
