= Leinster Senior Club Football Championship =

Gaelic football tournament

- Current season or competition: 2026 Leinster Senior Club Football Championship
- Irish: Craobh Sinsir Peile Laighean na gClub
- Founded: 1970
- Trophy: Seán McCabe Cup
- Title holders: Ballyboden St Enda's (3rd title)
- Most titles: St. Vincent's & Portlaoise & Kilmacud Crokes (7 titles)
- Sponsors: Allied Irish Banks
- TV partner: TG4
- Motto: The toughest of them all

The Leinster Senior Club Football Championship, called the Leinster Club SFC for short, is an annual Gaelic football tournament played on a knockout basis between the senior club championship winners of the competing counties in Leinster. The current holders of the Leinster title are Kilmacud Crokes from Dublin. Offaly side Gracefield were the first winners of the Leinster senior club football championship in the 1970–71 season. The most successful clubs are St. Vincent's, and Kilmacud Crokes from Dublin, and Portlaoise from Laois, who have won the Leinster championship on seven occasions. Carlow club Éire Óg won 5 championships in 7 years in the 1990s. Dublin clubs have won the Leinster championship twenty five times, which is more than triple any other county. The winner of this competition represents Leinster in the semi-finals of the All-Ireland Senior Club Football Championship.

== Wins by team ==
	Team	Wins	Years won	County
1	St. Vincent's	7	1972, 1975, 1984, 2007, 2013, 2014, 2016	Dublin
1	Portlaoise	7	1971, 1976, 1982, 1985, 1987, 2004, 2009	Laois
1	Kilmacud Crokes	7	1994, 2005, 2008, 2010, 2021, 2022, 2023	Dublin
4	Éire Óg	5	1992, 1993, 1995, 1996, 1998	Carlow
5	Ballyboden St. Enda's	3	2015, 2019, 2025	Dublin
6	Moorefield	2	2006, 2017	Kildare
6	Thomas Davis	2	1990, 1991	Dublin
6	Walterstown	2	1980, 1983	Meath
6	Walsh Island	2	1978, 1979	Offaly
6	UCD	2	1973, 1974	Dublin
11	Cuala	1	2024	Dublin
11	Mullinalaghta St. Columba's	1	2018	Longford
11	Ballymun Kickhams	1	2012	Dublin
11	Garrycastle	1	2011	Westmeath
11	St. Brigid's	1	2003	Dublin
11	Dunshaughlin	1	2002	Meath
11	Rathnew	1	2001	Wicklow
11	O'Hanrahans	1	2000	Carlow
11	Na Fianna	1	1999	Dublin
11	Erin's Isle	1	1997	Dublin
11	Baltinglass	1	1989	Wicklow
11	Parnells	1	1988	Dublin
11	Ferbane	1	1986	Offaly
11	Raheens	1	1981	Kildare
11	Summerhill	1	1977	Meath
11	Gracefield	1	1970	Offaly

== Wins by county ==
#	County	Leinster Titles	Runners-up	Last provincial winners
1	Dublin clubs	27	11	Ballyboden St. Enda's, 2025
2	Laois clubs	7	9	Portlaoise, 2009
3	Carlow clubs	6	2	O'Hanrahans, 2000
4	Offaly clubs	4	9	Ferbane, 1986
4	Meath clubs	4	2	Dunshaughlin, 2002
6	Kildare clubs	3	7	Moorefield, 2017
7	Wicklow clubs	2	4	Rathnew, 2001
8	Westmeath clubs	1	6	Garrycastle, 2011
8	Longford clubs	1	0	Mullinalaghta St. Columba's, 2018
9	Louth clubs	0	5	

No club from Kilkenny or Wexford has ever appeared in a Leinster Club Football Championship final.

== Finals by year ==
Year	Winner	County	Score	Opponent	County	Score
2025	Ballyboden St. Enda's	Dublin	2-18	Athy	Kildare	1-14
2024	Cuala	Dublin	1-14	St Mary's	Louth	2-10
2023	Kilmacud Crokes	Dublin	1-14	Naas	Kildare	0-10
2022	Kilmacud Crokes	Dublin	1-12	The Downs	Westmeath	0-08
2021	Kilmacud Crokes	Dublin	0-14	Naas	Kildare	0-07
2020	Cancelled due to the impact of the COVID-19 pandemic on Gaelic games					
2019	Ballyboden St Enda's	Dublin	0-08	Éire Óg	Carlow	0-06
2018	Mullinalaghta St Columba's	Longford	1-08	Kilmacud Crokes	Dublin	1-06
2017	Moorefield	Kildare	1-14	St Loman's	Westmeath	2-10
2016	St Vincents	Dublin	1-16	Rhode	Offaly	0-12
2015	Ballyboden St Enda's	Dublin	2-09	Portlaoise	Laois	1-11
2014	St Vincents	Dublin	1-13	Rhode	Offaly	0-06
2013	St. Vincent's	Dublin	3-12	Portlaoise	Laois	3-09
2012	Ballymun Kickhams	Dublin	0-11	Portlaoise	Laois	0-08
2011	Garrycastle	Westmeath	1-08	St Brigids	Dublin	0-10
2010	Kilmacud Crokes	Dublin	0-15	Rhode	Offaly	1-07
2009	Portlaoise	Laois	1-09	Garrycastle	Westmeath	1-05
2008	Kilmacud Crokes	Dublin	2-07	Rhode	Offaly	1-07
2007	St Vincents	Dublin	2-08	Tyrrellspass	Westmeath	0-07
2006	Moorefield	Kildare	3-06	Rhode	Offaly	0-08
2005	Kilmacud Crokes	Dublin	0-10	Sarsfields	Kildare	0-09
2004	Portlaoise	Laois	1-11	Skryne	Meath	2-04
2003	St Brigids	Dublin	3-11	Round Towers	Kildare	1-10
2002	Dunshaughlin	Meath	0-13	Mattock Rangers	Louth	0-07
2001	Rathnew	Wicklow	2-16 (R); 0-09	Na Fianna	Dublin	1-10 (R); 1-06
2000	O'Hanrahans	Carlow	1-07	Na Fianna	Dublin	1-05
1999	Na Fianna	Dublin	1-11	Sarsfields	Kildare	0-08
1998	Éire Óg	Carlow	1-11 (2nd R); 0-07 (1st R); 1-06	Kilmacud Crokes	Dublin	0-11 (2nd R); 0-07 (1st R); 0-09
1997	Erin's Isle	Dublin	2-11	Clane	Kildare	1-11
1996	Éire Óg	Carlow	1-10	St Sylvester's, Malahide	Dublin	0-08
1995	Éire Óg	Carlow	0-15 (R); 2-09	An Tóchar	Wicklow	1-06 (R); 0-15
1994	Kilmacud Crokes	Dublin	0-12	Seneschalstown	Meath	1-08
1993	Éire Óg	Carlow	3-07	Erin's Isle	Dublin	0-11
1992	Éire Óg	Carlow	2-05	Ballyroan	Laois	0-07
1991	Thomas Davis	Dublin	1-07	Clara	Offaly	1-05
1990	Thomas Davis	Dublin	1-08 (R); 0-08	Baltinglass	Wicklow	0-08 (R); 1-05
1989	Baltinglass	Wicklow	1-09 (R); 1-06	Thomas Davis	Dublin	0-11 (R); 1-06
1988	Parnells	Dublin	1-04 (R); 2-05	Ferbane	Offaly	0-06 (R); 1-08
1987	Portlaoise	Laois	1-07 (R); 1-08	Parnells	Dublin	1-05 (R); 1-08
1986	Ferbane	Offaly	3-05	Portlaoise	Laois	1-10
1985	Portlaoise	Laois	2-08 (R); 1-08	Baltinglass	Wicklow	1-09 (R); 1-08
1984	St Vincents	Dublin	1-13	Tinahely	Wicklow	1-03
1983	Walterstown	Meath	3-09	Walsh Island	Offaly	2-11
1982	Portlaoise	Laois	1-08	Ballymun Kickhams	Dublin	0-07
1981	Raheens	Kildare	1-07	Portlaoise	Laois	0-06
1980	Walterstown	Meath	2-09	Éire Óg	Carlow	2-08
1979	Walsh Island	Offaly	3-02	Portlaoise	Laois	1-06
1978	Walsh Island	Offaly	2-09	St Josephs	Laois	3-05
1977	Summerhill	Meath	5-04	St Vincents	Dublin	0-06
1976	Portlaoise	Laois	1-12	Cooley Kickhams	Louth	0-08
1975	St Vincents	Dublin	3-09	St Josephs	Laois	1-08
1974	UCD	Dublin	2-07	Ferbane	Offaly	1-09
1973	UCD	Dublin	1-06	Cooley Kickhams	Louth	0-07
1972	St Vincents	Dublin	6-10	The Downs	Westmeath	2-05
1971	Portlaoise	Laois	2-11	Athlone	Westmeath	2-09
1970	Gracefield	Offaly	0-12	Newtown Blues	Louth	0-09

== See also ==
- 2009 Leinster Senior Club Football Championship

== Sources ==
- Roll of Honour from Leinster GAA website (archived 2011)
- Moorefield crowned 2006 champions of Leinster
