= Coastal and offshore rowing =

Rowing sport performed at sea

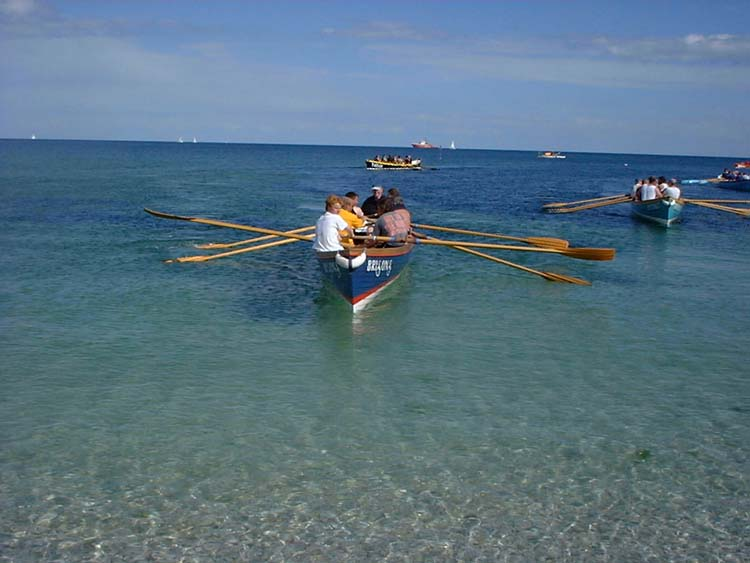
A Cornish pilot gig, a six crew boat returning from a race at Falmouth in Cornwall

Coastal and offshore rowing is a rowing sport performed at sea. In North America, this sport is often called open water rowing.

Due to conditions at sea, coastal and offshore rowers may face difficult circumstances compared to river or lake rowers. To withstand it the boats usually are wider and more robust.

== International competition ==
At present, most British sea rowing is "traditional" fixed seat rowing and competition is of a regional nature. France is leading the development of modern sliding seat seagoing boats, "Yoles", and National Competition here is well established with FISA, the worldwide regulatory body for rowing, encouraging the expansion of the sport to other countries.

Since 2007, the competition has been renamed as the FISA World Club Coastal Rowing Challenge, thus opening the event to all Club rowers without pre-qualification.

Coastal rowing will be included in the 2028 Summer Olympics, in the form of beach sprint rowing.

== Africa ==
=== South Africa ===
Competitive rowing has been taking place on dams and rivers in South Africa since colonial times, but since May 2011 a growing number of people have participated in recreational coastal rowing in Cape Town as well. This has taken place mainly on False Bay from the naval base at Simon's Town, but there have also been regular outings to bodies of water elsewhere in the region, including the Berg and Breede Rivers, Langebaan and Hermanus lagoons, and the Atlantic Ocean in the vicinity of Cape Point. The Cape Coastal Rowing fleet now includes a range of quads, doubles and singles.

== Australia ==
The sport of open water rowing is in the early stages in Australia. The American model of lightweight open water boats is generally being adopted. Most open water rowing is done for recreation, but competition will soon be established and the sport is expected to expand.

Surf boat rowing is very popular in Australia and New Zealand, and to a lesser extent South Africa. The Australian form of the sport is often featured on sporting shows in the summer months. Surf boats are four-oared vessels with pointed bows and sterns. The boat is steered by a sweep who stands in the stern and uses an oar-like rudder to control the boat. During competition surf crews start on the beach and row through the surf to then proceed to a certain number of turning points (often referred to as the can). Crews then race back to the beach. As the boat nears the beach oars are raised and the boat is literally surfed to shore. Surf boat races are conducted on a weekly basis throughout the Australian summer.

== Europe ==
=== France ===
Coastal rowing in France is a well-established activity that takes advantage of the country's lengthy and varied coastline. The sport is particularly prevalent in several key regions known for their maritime heritage and conducive rowing conditions:

- Brittany (Bretagne): Brittany serves as a central location for coastal rowing enthusiasts and hosts numerous events throughout the year.
- Normandy (Normandie): Along the historic beaches of Normandy, coastal rowing thrives, supported by a network of clubs.
- The Mediterranean Coast: The French Riviera (Côte d'Azur) and the shores of Languedoc-Roussillon offer ideal conditions for coastal rowing, attracting rowers to the calmer Mediterranean Sea.
- The Atlantic Coast: The Atlantic Coast, particularly along the Bay of Biscay in areas such as Aquitaine, is favored by coastal rowers for its open waters and vibrant rowing culture.

These regions, among others form a diverse coastal rowing scene in France, where the sport continues to grow in popularity and recognition.

=== Ireland ===
Coastal rowing in Ireland consists of a number of associations from around the coast of Ireland. The south west coast covering counties Cork and Kerry has the highest concentration of rowing clubs and is governed by the Coastal Rowing Association (CRA), Rowing Ireland and the South West Coast Yawl Rowing Association (SWCYRA), and the South & Mid Kerry Rowing Board (SMKRB). The Irish Sea from Skerries in North Dublin, heading south as far as Arklow, County Wicklow is governed by the East Coast Rowing Council. Antrim coast is covered by the Antrim Coast Rowing Association (ACRA), and Wexford is governed by Slaney Rowing Association (SRA).

Throughout the summer season the different associations of coastal rowing in Ireland hold championships using either the traditional boats of the area or the Celtic Yawl. The season generally ends with the annual All-Ireland Coastal Rowing Championships, These All-Irelands involve in excess of 400 crews across a range of disciplines and is one of the biggest coastal rowing regattas in the British Isles. The Celtic Yawl was first introduced in 2002 by the Irish Coastal Rowing Federation as a means of bridging the gap between the various classes of coastal rowing boats in Ireland, it was designed by Rob Jacob and originally built by Roddy O Connor of Customworks in Cork. John Keohane of Elite Coastal Rowing is now the sole builder. The concept successfully achieved its aim by levelling the playing field for all, irrespective of the qualities of their traditional boat. examples of the classes of coastal boats in Ireland are: East Coast Skiffs, the Cork yawls, the Kerry four oars, Wexford/Slaney cots, Antrim gigs and Donegal skiffs.

In addition to fixed seat coastal rowing, sliding seat coastal rowing (called offshore in Ireland to distinguish) also takes place and is a fast growing rowing discipline in Ireland. Rowing Ireland created an Offshore Division in 2017 and since then over 200 offshore boats have been purchased. The highlight of the offshore rowing year is the Irish Offshore Rowing Championships. Irish crews generally participate in large numbers at the club based World Coastal Rowing Championships. Monika Dukarska (Killorglin Rowing Club) won the CW1x World Championship in 2009 and 2016 while John Keohane (Kilmacsimon Rowing Club) won the CM1x in 2010. Ireland has also started to send national teams to the World Rowing Beach Sprint Finals.

=== Netherlands ===
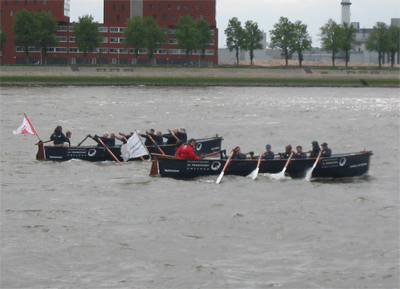
Sloeproeien in Rotterdam

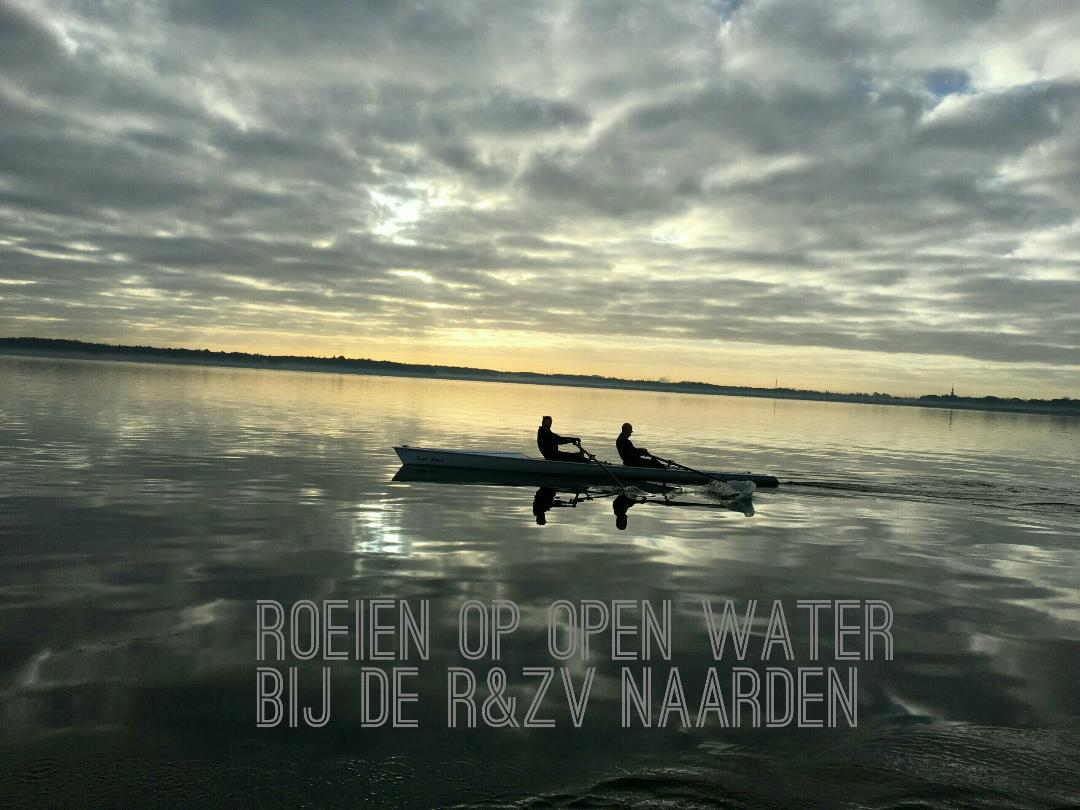
Coastal Rowing on Gooimeer, Naarden, the Netherlands

Coastal rowing in the Netherlands is gaining popularity fast. The Royal Dutch Rowing Association (KNRB) now has a committee coastal rowing. in 2018 a competition of five races was expected to be held for Yole de mers in Muiden, Loosdrecht, Medemblik Rotterdam and Amsterdam IJburg. There was also to be a demonstration race during the stop over of the Volvo Ocean Race in Scheveningen on July 1.

Several rowing clubs in the Netherlands have adopted Coastal Rowing as a discipline, e.g. Roei- en Zeilvereniging Naarden. This sail and rowing club already started Coastal Rowing in 2004 with two Yole the Mers. Meanwhile, more than 50 coastal rowers practice Coastal Rowing on Gooimeer and IJmeer.

The committee coastal rowing also will organise a number of recreational tours and a number of clinics. Dutch Coastal Rowing (DCR) is organising longer coastal tours.

=== Norway ===
Coastal rowing in Norway is primarily practiced in Christiania Roklub, Oslo and Kristiansand. An online community of coastal rowers in Norway called Team Coastal Rowing Norway is based in Oslo. Norway has been increasingly active in participating at the world coastal rowing championships.

=== Spain ===
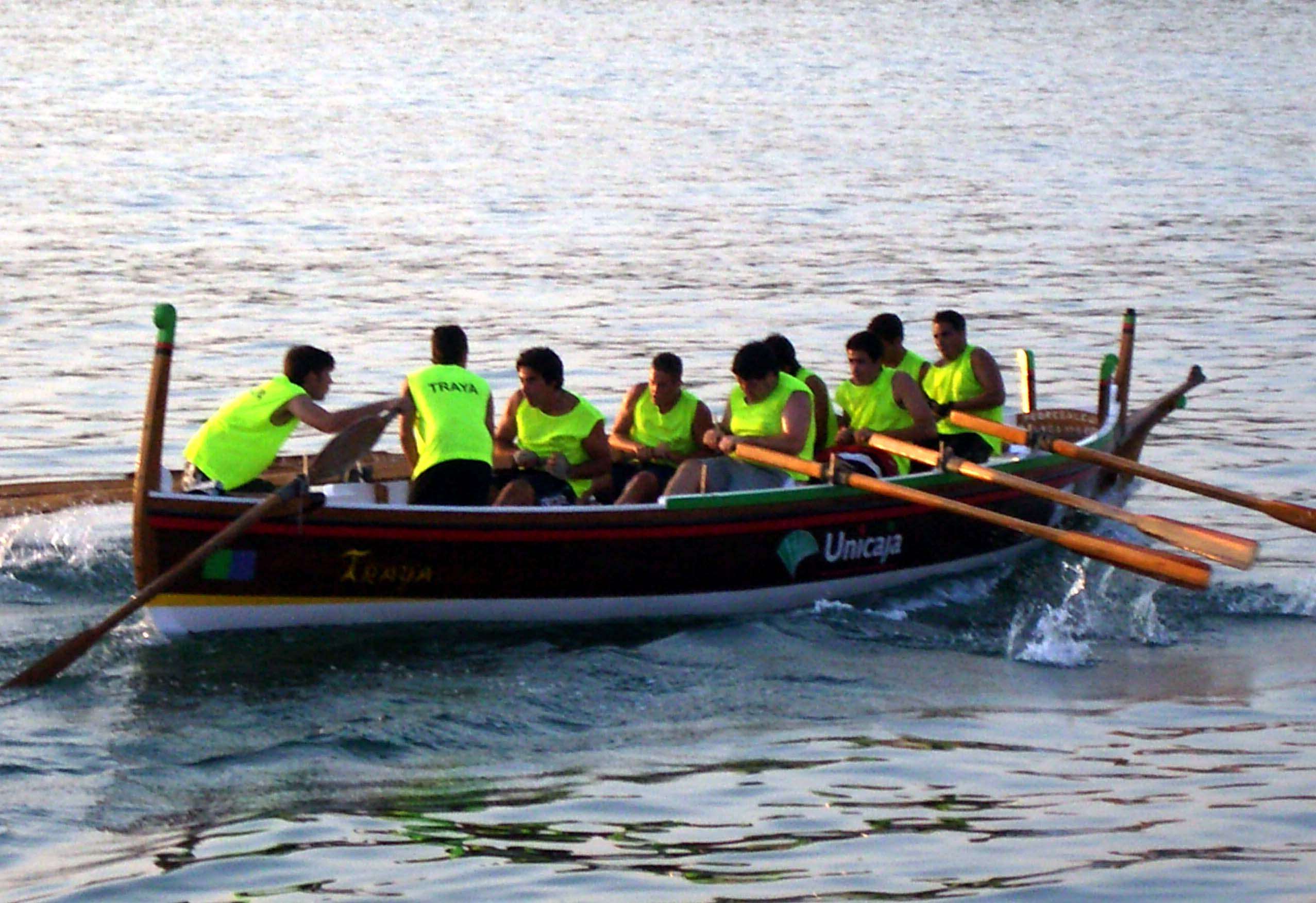
Regatta of "barcas de jábegas" in the Port of Málaga, Spain

The Spanish seafaring tradition has left a very important heritage of coastal rowing scull boats, in another time devoted to tasks of fishing, and now used for sport and leisure activities. Among the best known are the “traineras” and “bateles”, typical of northern Spain, the “llaüts” and “faluchos”, from the east regions of Spain, and the “barcas de jábega” in the southeast Spanish Mediterranean coast.

The racing of Seine boats takes place each summer in the city of Malaga and in its nearby villages. Currently, there are seven oars, with a length between 7 and 9 m and weighing between 850 and 1,150 kg. At present, clubs in the province of Malaga are represented by the "Asociación de Barcas de Jabega" which coordinates its activities and races.

=== United Kingdom ===
The Cornish Pilot Gig Association is the largest British sea rowing group and preserves a tradition using both original and new boats made to a closely controlled specification. The CPGA has seen continuing growth and new boats are built to satisfy the demand. The Cornish gig has been adopted by rowers in the Netherlands and there is a successful gig club in Wales.

The resurgence in the tradition of boatbuilding in Essex has seen the development of East Coast gigs. Built by the Pioneer Sailing Trust in Brightlingsea, the coxed four Harker's Yard gigs are based on a 19th-century design. A strong racing scene has developed around these gigs and club affiliation extends from Manningtree, on the Essex/Suffolk border, to Maldon, in the south of the county. The gigs are traditionally named after fishing smacks built in Brightlingsea before WWII. The first boat to be built, the Velocity, is owned and raced by Brightlingsea Coastal Rowing Club.

Other groups thrive throughout British coastal regions: from Shetland in the North, Whitby and Scarborough on the North Sea; and Seine boat rowers on the Teign; to the Channel Islands.

Following about forty years of design development using chined plywood hulls, both Guernsey and Jersey are now importing superior double and single washdeck fibreglass boats from France. Semi-washdeck, chined, double skinned, plywood quads, were under construction in Guernsey during the first decade of this century, though none were built in 2009. A Guernsey designed carbon fibre double and quad appeared in 2008. This design went into production in the UK in 2009, with a fleet being built for the 2009 world championships in Plymouth. Boat building in Jersey ceased in the 1980s. All Channel Island boats are now built to FISA dimensions.

The open Welsh Celtic Longboat style craft introduced in the mid-1970s has since the early 2000s evolved into a double skinned "washdeck" boat and now is the only design under construction. From 2006 FISA dimensions are followed in hull design.

==== England (South Coast) ====
Competitive sliding seat coastal rowing has taken place on the south coast of England since the late 19th century. It is regulated by two bodies, The Hants and Dorset Amateur Rowing Association which regulates competition from Swanage to Southsea; and The Coast Amateur Rowing Association (Worthing to Herne Bay). Due to the fact that both associations were originally unified, Southsea and Worthing, the border clubs of associations, have membership in both, although each predominantly race in one. Both bodies operate under the auspices of the national governing body British Rowing.

In common with British flat water rowing, regattas are held in the summer months with races of around 2,000 metres (1.1 nmi), with longer processional head races held in the winter months in more sheltered river and estuary waters. The points system to categorise athletes is slightly different but compatible with the flat water points system, with the same separate statuses for sweep and sculling.

Talented athletes from HDARA and CARA clubs have found their way into British Rowing's national team programmes for flat water/ Olympic rowing, as the similarity in equipment used and race distance lends itself quite well to changing between the two disciplines. Most CARA and HDARA clubs have fine boats as well as their coastal boats, and club members often also compete in river events.

Coastal boats used are coxed IVs, coxless pair and single sculls for championships, with double sculls and mixed crews used for non-championship or fun events. All boats are wider than their river counterparts with higher freeboard to cope with coastal conditions. The fours are restricted to 30 feet (9.1 m) in length (the dimensions of an old railway carriage which was used to transport the equipment before the use of cars and trailers) and the pairs and singles to 22 feet 6 inches (6.86 m). Some (predominantly HDARA and older CARA boats) have staggered seating to accommodate the rowers in the reduced length and spread the weight across the width of the boat for stability. The reduced dimensions of the boat also aid in the buoy turn, as unlike river races the start and finish points for these forms of coastal events are the same point and require a 180° "spin" around a marker (either a buoy, or a float with a flag on top called a "dan"). Bow and stroke side is reversed from CARA and HDARA to make the clockwise buoy turn more effective, with bowside pulling the boat around.

Regatta races are typically conducted along the beach, round a buoy (one for each competitor, moored in a line), and back (1,000 m or 0.54 nmi both ways). Regatta locations vary from the rough and exposed, such as Bournemouth or Shanklin to the more sheltered, such as Southampton Water.

Crews from the Hampshire and Dorset and the Coast Amateur rowing association come together along with those from the West of England ARA each year for the South Coast Rowing Championships which is held alternately in Coastal and River Fine boats.

==== Scotland ====
A St. Ayles Skiff, a five crew boat during a race at Anstruther in Fife

The Scottish Coastal Rowing Association was founded in May 2010, adopting the St. Ayles Skiff as the standard hull for its races. The St Ayles is built from a plywood kit, with the express intention of keeping the construction costs to a minimum to increase the uptake. The design was first launched in October 2009; by mid-2015, 163 kits had been sold in the United Kingdom, with over 100 launched. The class is also gaining popularity in Australia, New Zealand, and North America.

The first world championship for the St Ayles was held at Ullapool in Scotland in July 2013 with 30 skiffs in attendance. The next "Skiffieworlds" was scheduled to be held in Strangford Lough, Northern Ireland in 2016.

Competition thrives, both in a league system, and "one off" challenges. The 22-mile (19 nmi; 35 km) London Great River Race is the major British event for traditional boats, attracting up to 350 crews, but there are many regular events throughout the long March to October season. A similar event takes place in Cork, Ireland every year; the Ocean to City race is 15 nautical miles (28 km; 17 mi) traversing Cork harbour. In 2006, 150 traditional boats completed the event.

==== Wales ====
The Welsh Sea Rowing Association organises a total of 21 offshore and estuary events each year. These range from 5-mile (4.3 nmi; 8.0 km) league races to the 90-mile (78 nmi; 140 km) Celtic challenge rowing race, an epic Irish Sea crossing.

The annual Interceltic Watersports competition features, amongst other events, sea rowing using both traditional and modern craft. This has greatly helped in the development of open water competition amongst rowers from the ten Celtic nations, and Welsh rowers now compete across Europe, representing Great Britain in France, Italy, and Spain.

Celtic Sea rowers in Wales and Ireland have adopted modern designs of fixed seat boats, loosely based on the Irish currach, which itself is still used by sea rowers in both countries and the Cork Yawl, which was the base design for the Celtic yawl used for the Irish Coastal Rowing Championships run by Rowing Ireland.

== North America ==
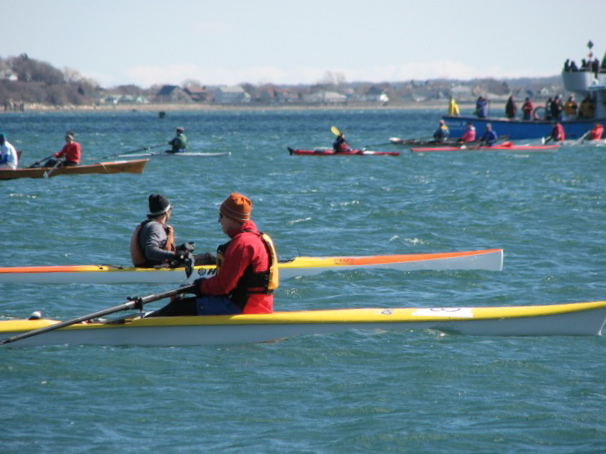
Rowers await the start at the 32nd Annual Snow Row in Hull, Massachusetts.

In North America (where the sport is known as "open water rowing"), coastal rowing typically involves longer, lighter and faster boats, more similar to flat-water racing shells, yet designed for stability and safety in chop, wakes and swells. Stability is achieved by a broader waterline beam with safety ensured through the use of positive flotation, self-bailing capacity, supplemented by the rower's seamanship skills. North American boats do not conform to the minimum standards established by FISA, because they are too long and do not weigh enough.

Open water boats are used for racing, recreation, touring, health and fitness and serve the adaptive rowing community. Open water rowing in North America is popular on the Chesapeake Bay, in coastal towns of Massachusetts, Long Island Sound communities in Connecticut and New York, California, and Washington. Open water racing is practiced on both the west and east coasts of the U.S. Sound Rowers and Paddlers is a Washington club which has sponsored about 15 open water races each year since 1988.

== South America ==
In South America coastal rowing first occurred in Peru, in the Club de Regatas Lima. In the Atlantic Ocean, there is a small group of coastal rowers in the Escuela de Remo de Punta Carretas in Montevideo, Uruguay.
