= Arklow Rowing Club =

Rowing club in County Wicklow, Ireland

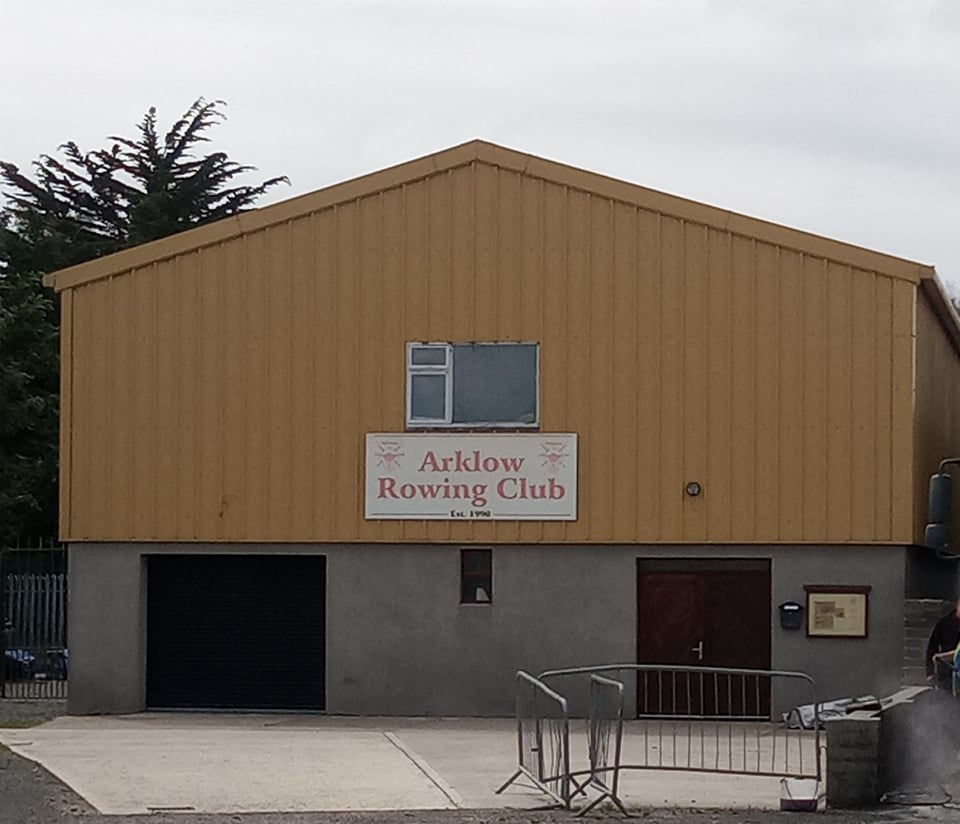
- Location: Dock Road, Arklow, County Wicklow, Ireland
- Coordinates: 52°47′32.5″N 6°8′50.4″W
- Founded: 1990
- Website: arklowrowingclub.ie

Arklow Rowing Club is a coastal rowing club located in Arklow, County Wicklow, Ireland. Founded in 1990, the club is a member of the East Coast Rowing Council and affiliated to Rowing Ireland, and races year-round in local, national, and international events.

== Racing ==
Each year the ECRC organises a summer schedule of regattas at clubs from Ringsend to Arklow where crews of all ages compete during the regatta. ECRC clubs also regularly compete in the biennial ‘Celtic Challenge’, a race of over 90 miles from Arklow to Aberystwyth in Wales as well as other long distance races such as the annual Ocean to City race in Cork, or the Kish lighthouse row in Dublin. Clubs can be regularly seen training at sea along the East Coast between April and September each year. Present day racing skiffs reflect their traditional origins, and are 25-foot-long (7.6 m), clinker built, double-enders.

== Achievements ==
Arklow has won various Irish titles across many Coastal Rowing categories, and has qualified crews for multiple World Rowing Coastal Championships.
