= Celtic Challenge Rowing Race =

Ireland-Wales rowing race

The Celtic Challenge Rowing Race is a 96-mile (150 km) rowing race from Arklow in Ireland to Aberystwyth in Wales. It is a biennial event which usually takes place on the first Saturday in May. Crews from Wales, Ireland, England and as far afield as Germany compete.

== Description ==
The race is open to all 4-oared boats with a cox. No sliding seats or out-riggers are accepted. Normal class entries are Celtic Longboat, Pembrokeshire longboat, Irish East Coast skiff, Irish All Ireland class boat and a variety of Thames skiffs. Each crew consists of 12 people, therefore crew changeover strategies are a must. There is a Senior Men's category along with Senior Ladies, Veteran, Mixed and Miscellaneous categories.

== History ==
In 1989 a crew from Aberystwyth Lifeboat rowed from Arklow to Aberystwyth to raise money for the Bronglais Hospital Scanner Appeal, raising a sum of approximately £4000, taking well over 22 hours to complete the course. In 1991 the Lifeboat crew did another sponsored row from Arklow to Aberystwyth raising money towards the new Lifeboat Station at Aberystwyth. It was from these two sponsored crossings from Arklow that the idea for Celtic Challenge was conceived. In 1993 the first Celtic Challenge Rowing race took place starting from Arklow and ending in Aberystwyth and since then the challenge has taken place in 1995, 1997, 1999, 2002, 2006 and 2008. The 2001 event was cancelled due to foot and mouth and in 2002 14 crews took part. The 2004 challenge was cancelled due to bad weather. 2006 had 17 entries.

A documentary of the 2008 Celtic Challenge, called 'Crossing the Irish' was completed by Rob Garwood in 2009.

== See also ==
- East Coast Rowing Council
- Welsh Sea Rowing Association
