= East Coast Rowing Council =

The East Coast Rowing Council is the regional organisation of Skiff rowing on Ireland's East coast, representing the sport of Coastal and ocean rowing. As per local tradition, coastal rowing is undertaken by crews of four with one sweep oar each, and a coxswain, in wooden clinker-built boats. Formed in 1936, the ECRC has the task of formalising the rules, organising regatta dates and judging any disputes between members. Rules were laid down as to sizes and weights of skiffs to make races fairer. The ECRC represents clubs in the counties of Dublin, Wicklow, and North Wexford.

== East Coast tradition ==
Clinker skiff-type boats were once one of the most numerous type of working boats found along the eastern seaboard of Ireland. They were recorded in 1874 by historian E.W. Holdsworth, where he noted that 'the smaller boats employed for the line-fishery are of the same style as the Norway yawl, sharp at both ends'.

Skiff racing has its origins in the occupation of hobbling. Hobblers were freelance pilots, and competition was strong to be the first to board the approaching ships. Not only did the successful hobblers receive payment to pilot the ships into port but they were also awarded the contract for discharging/loading those ships whilst in port.

The skiffs worked mainly between Lambay Island just north of Dublin Bay and Wicklow Head, where they required considerable skill on behalf of the oarsmen. The long tradition of rowing is now carried on through the rowing clubs affiliated to East Coast Rowing Council. These clubs can be found around the old Dublin pilot stations of Ringsend and East Wall in Dublin Port, Dun Laoghaire, Dalkey, Bray, Greystones, Wicklow, Arklow, and Courtown.

== Member clubs ==
The current members of the ECRC are:

- Fingal Rowing Club, Balbriggan, Co Dublin
- Skerries Rowing Club
- St. Patrick's Rowing Club, Ringsend
- Stella Maris Rowing Club, Ringsend
- St. Michael’s Rowing Club, Dún Laoghaire
- Dalkey Rowing Club
- Bray Rowing Club
- Greystones Rowing Club
- Wicklow Rowing Club
- Arklow Rowing Club
- Courtown Rowing Club

== Racing ==
Each year the ECRC organises a summer schedule of regattas at clubs from Ringsend to Arklow where crews of all ages compete during the regatta. ECRC clubs also regularly compete in the biennial ‘Celtic Challenge’, a race of over 90 miles from Arklow to Aberystwyth in Wales as well as other long-distance races such as the annual Ocean to City race in Cork, or the Kish lighthouse row in Dublin. Clubs can be regularly seen training at sea along the East Coast between April and September each year. Present day racing skiffs reflect their traditional origins, and are 25-foot-long (7.6 m), clinker built, double-enders.

=== 2017 events and regattas ===
The ECRC schedule for 2017 is as follows:-

Host	Location	Date
Arklow Rowing Club	Arklow	Sun 21 May
Skerries Rowing Club	Skerries	Sun 18 June
Bray Rowing Club	Bray	Sun 25 June
St. Michael's Rowing Club	Dun Laoghaire	Sun 9 July
Stella Maris Rowing Club	Ringsend	Sun 16 July
St. Patrick's Rowing Club	Ringsend	Sun 30 July
Greystones Rowing Club	Greystones	Sat 5 August
Wicklow Rowing Club	Wicklow	Mon 7 August
Dalkey Rowing Club	Sandycove	Sun 13 August

=== 2016 events and regattas ===
The ECRC schedule for 2016 was as follows:-

Host	Location	Date
Arklow Rowing Club	Arklow	Sun 29 May
Skerries Rowing Club	Skerries	Sun 12 June
Bray Rowing Club	Bray	Sun 19 June
St. Michael's Rowing Club	Dun Laoghaire	Sun 3 July
Dalkey Rowing Club	Sandycove	Sun 10 July
Stella Maris Rowing Club	Ringsend	Sun 17 July
St. Patrick's Rowing Club	Ringsend	Sun 24 July
Greystones Rowing Club	Greystones	Sat 30 July
Wicklow Rowing Club	Wicklow	Mon 1 August

=== 2015 events and regattas ===
The ECRC schedule for 2015 was as follows:-

Host	Location	Date
Arklow Rowing Club	Arklow	Sun 7 June
St. Patrick's Rowing Club	Ringsend	Sun 21 June
Greystones Rowing Club	Greystones	Sun 28 June
Bray Rowing Club	Bray	Sun 5 July
Skerries Rowing Club	Skerries	Sun 12 July
St. Michael's Rowing Club	Dun Laoghaire	Sun 19 July
Stella Maris Rowing Club	Ringsend	Sun 26 July
Dalkey Rowing Club	Sandycove	Sat 1 Aug
Wicklow Rowing Club	Wicklow	Mon 3 August

=== 2014 events and regattas ===
The ECRC schedule for 2014 was as follows:-

Host	Location	Date
Arklow Rowing Club	Arklow	Sun 8 June
Dalkey Rowing Club	Sandycove	Sun 15 June
Stella Maris Rowing Club	Ringsend	Sun 22 June
St. Patrick's Rowing Club	Ringsend	Sun 29 June
Skerries Rowing Club	Skerries	Sun 6 July
Bray Rowing Club	Bray	Sun 13 July
St. Michael's Rowing Club	Dun Laoghaire	Sun 27 July
Greystones Rowing Club	Greystones	Sat 2 August
Wicklow Rowing Club	Wicklow	Mon 4 August

=== 2013 events and regattas ===
The schedule for 2013 (ECRC regattas and significant other regattas) was as follows:-

Host	Location	Date
Arklow Rowing Club	Arklow	Sun 2 June
Ocean to City (non-ERC)	Cork Hbr.	Sat 8 June
Dalkey Rowing Club	Sandycove	Sun 9 June
Stella Maris Rowing Club	Ringsend	Sun 16 June
Bray Rowing Club	Bray	Sun 30 June
Greystones Rowing Club	Greystones	Sun 7 July
St. Patrick's Rowing Club	Ringsend	Sun 14 July
Skerries Rowing Club	Skerries	Sun 21 July
St. Michael's Rowing Club	Dun Laoghaire	Sun 28 July
Wicklow Rowing Club	Wicklow	Mon 5 August
All Ireland Championships (non-ERC)	Carnlough, Antrim	Fri/Sat/Sun 23/24/25 August

=== 2012 events and regattas ===
The schedule for 2012 (ECRC and non-ECRC events) was as follows:-

Host	Location	Date
Celtic Challenge	Arklow – Aberystwyth	4–7 May
Ocean to City	Cork Hbr.	Sun 3 June
Arklow	Arklow	Sun 10 June
Dalkey (cancelled)	Sandycove	Sun 17 June (cancelled)
St. Michael's	Dun Laoghaire	Sun 24 June
Bray	Bray	Sun 8 July
Stella Maris	Ringsend	Sun 15 July
St. Patrick's	Ringsend	Sun 22 July
Greystones	Greystones	Sat 4 August
Wicklow	Wicklow	Mon 6 August
All Ireland Championships	Courtmacsherry – Cork	Sat/Sun 25/26 August
Hobbler's Challenge (25 km race)	Dun Laoghaire	Sat 8 September

=== 2011 events and regattas ===
The schedule for 2011 was as follows:-

Host	Location	Date
Stella Maris	Ringsend	Sun 29 May
St. Michael's	West Pier, Dun Laoghaire Hbr.	Sun 19 June
Arklow	Arklow	Sun 26 June
Courtown	Courtown	Sun 10 July
Bray	Bray	Sun 17 July
St. Patrick's	Ringsend	Sat/Sun 23/24 July
Greystones	Wicklow	Sat 30 July
Wicklow	Wicklow	Mon 1 August
All Ireland Championships	Rosslare – Wexford	Sat/Sun 20/21 August
Hobbler's Challenge (25 km race)	Dun Laoghaire	Sat 3 September

=== 2010 events and regattas ===
2010 was an exciting year in the ECRC calendar with the ‘Celtic Challenge’ kicking off the season for a few of the clubs. Below are the dates of most of the events ECRC crews made an appearance at:

Host	Location	Date
Celtic Challenge 2010	Arklow – Aberystwyth	1–2 May
Stella Maris	Ringsend	30 May
St. Michael's	West Pier, Dun Laoghaire Hbr.	13 June
Arklow	Arklow	27 June
St. Patrick's	Ringsend	4 July
Courtown	Courtown (format TBC)	11 July
Bray	Bray	18 July
Dalkey	Sandycove Hbr	25 July
Greystones	Wicklow	31 July
Wicklow	Wicklow	2 August
All Ireland Championships	Whitegate (Cork)	14/15 August
Hobbler's Challenge (25 km race)	Dun Laoghaire	21 August

=== 2009 regattas ===
Host	Location	Date
ECRC Invitational & Stella Maris	Ringsend	23/24 May
Greystones	Wicklow	7 June
Dalkey	Sandycove Hbr	14 June
St. Patrick's	Ringsend	28 June
St. Michael's	West Pier, Dun Laoghaire Hbr.	12 July
Bray	Bray	26 July
Wicklow	Wicklow	3 August
Arklow	Arklow	T.B.A.
