= Kate Tyrrell =

Irish sailor and businesswoman

- Born: 1863; Arklow, County Wicklow
- Died: 1921 (aged 57–58)
- Occupations: Nautical captain and owner of shipping company
- Years active: 1886–1921
- Spouse: John Fitzpatrick (married 1896 – 1921)
- Children: Two

Kate Tyrrell (1863–1921) was an Irish sailor and business woman. Inheriting a shipping company from her father, she captained the schooner Denbighshire Lass for over twenty years, and successfully fought rules forbidding women from having their name listed as the owner of a vessel.

== Early life and sailing education ==
Born in 1863 in Arklow, County Wicklow, Kate Tyrrell was the second of four daughters. Her father, Edward Tyrrell, was a sea captain who owned a shipping company that transported cargo between Ireland and Wales. As a child, Tyrrell loved hanging around her father's shipyard; by the time she was twelve, she was filling out shipping journals for him. Tyrrell gradually became indispensable to her father, and as she grew older, Tyrrell's father promised her that she would one day own a ship herself.

By the end of 1882, Tyrrell had lost her mother and a younger sister to tuberculosis. She took over running the household while also managing the bookkeeping for her father's business.

In 1885, Tyrrell's father bought a Welsh schooner, the Denbighshire Lass, and he registered the ship in Kate's name. She sailed it home from Wales herself. They used it to transport cargo such as coal, bricks, iron ore and textiles.

== Career ==
In July 1886, Tyrrell's father died from a heart attack, and Tyrrell took over the family business. She sold off several ships and became the sole owner of the Denbighshire Lass. Despite her ownership, however, as a woman she was not permitted to have her name on the ship's official documentation. As a temporary solution, a trusted male employee put his name on the documents, while Tyrrell ran all business operations, inspected repairs, and captained the crew.

In 1888, Tyrrell lost another younger sister to tuberculosis. Her last remaining sibling – the eldest Tyrrell sister – managed household affairs, while Kate supported them both through the shipping business. Tyrrell spent most of her time captaining the Denbighshire Lass personally, becoming adept at navigation and all aspects of sailing. She was known for being a stern enforcer of order on board her ship, intolerant of any drunken crew members on duty.

Throughout the 1890s, inspired by the growing women's suffrage movement, Tyrrell fought to have her name officially recognised on the ship's ownership documents. She succeeded at last in 1899, when she was finally acknowledged by shipping authorities as the owner.

The Denbighshire Lass continued to sail throughout World War I, navigating landmines in the Irish Sea without incident, despite having no insurance. It was the first ship to fly the new Irish tricolour flag at a foreign port.

== Family ==
In 1896, Tyrrell married her childhood friend John Fitzpatrick, and the couple had two children: James, born in 1900, and Elizabeth, born in 1905. Tyrrell kept her own surname after marriage, an almost unheard-of decision at the time.

== Death and legacy ==
After the birth of her second child, Tyrrell's health began to decline, and she became less able to travel frequently aboard her ship. She died in 1921, just four years before the Denbighshire Lass was formally retired at last.

In 2017, Tyrrell's grandson donated a set of signal flags and a fid from the Denbighshire Lass to the Arklow Maritime Museum. In 2018, Tyrrell's career was celebrated in as part of International Women's Day in Arklow.
