= Arklow Hill =

Hill in County Wicklow, Ireland

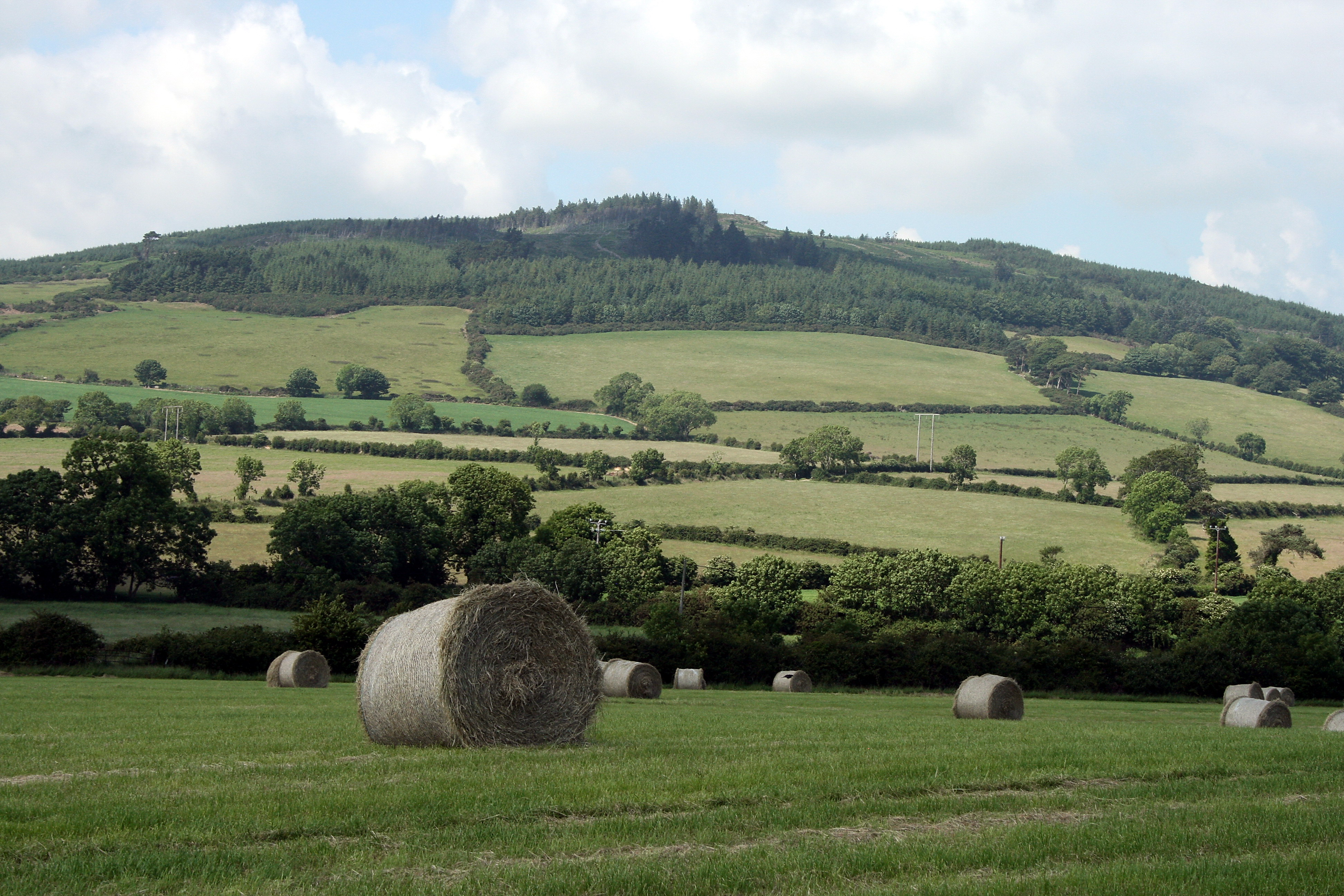
- Eastern slope

Highest point
- Elevation: 280 m (920 ft)
- Coordinates: 52°50′47″N 6°08′09″W

Geography
- Location: County Wicklow, Ireland
- Parent range: Wicklow Mountains
- Topo map: OSi Discovery 62

"Arklow Hill" or "Ballymoyle Hill" dominates the town of Arklow to the south and is situated in the southeastern section of the Wicklow Mountains, just 2 km from the Irish Sea coast. It is a prominent feature from the N11 National primary route which passes a kilometer east of the summit.

In the late 1960s and early 1970s when NET Nitrate (a chemical company) was producing fertilizer in the local factory in the Avoca valley, the letters N-E-T were spelt out in dark green on the southern slope of the hill, visible from the main road (the modern N11). This was achieved by spreading nitrogen fertilizer on meadow on the hill in the shape of the letters, which advertised the effectiveness of Nitrogen in producing vigorous growth compared to the area outside the fertilized zone. It was like a biological version of the Hollywood sign.

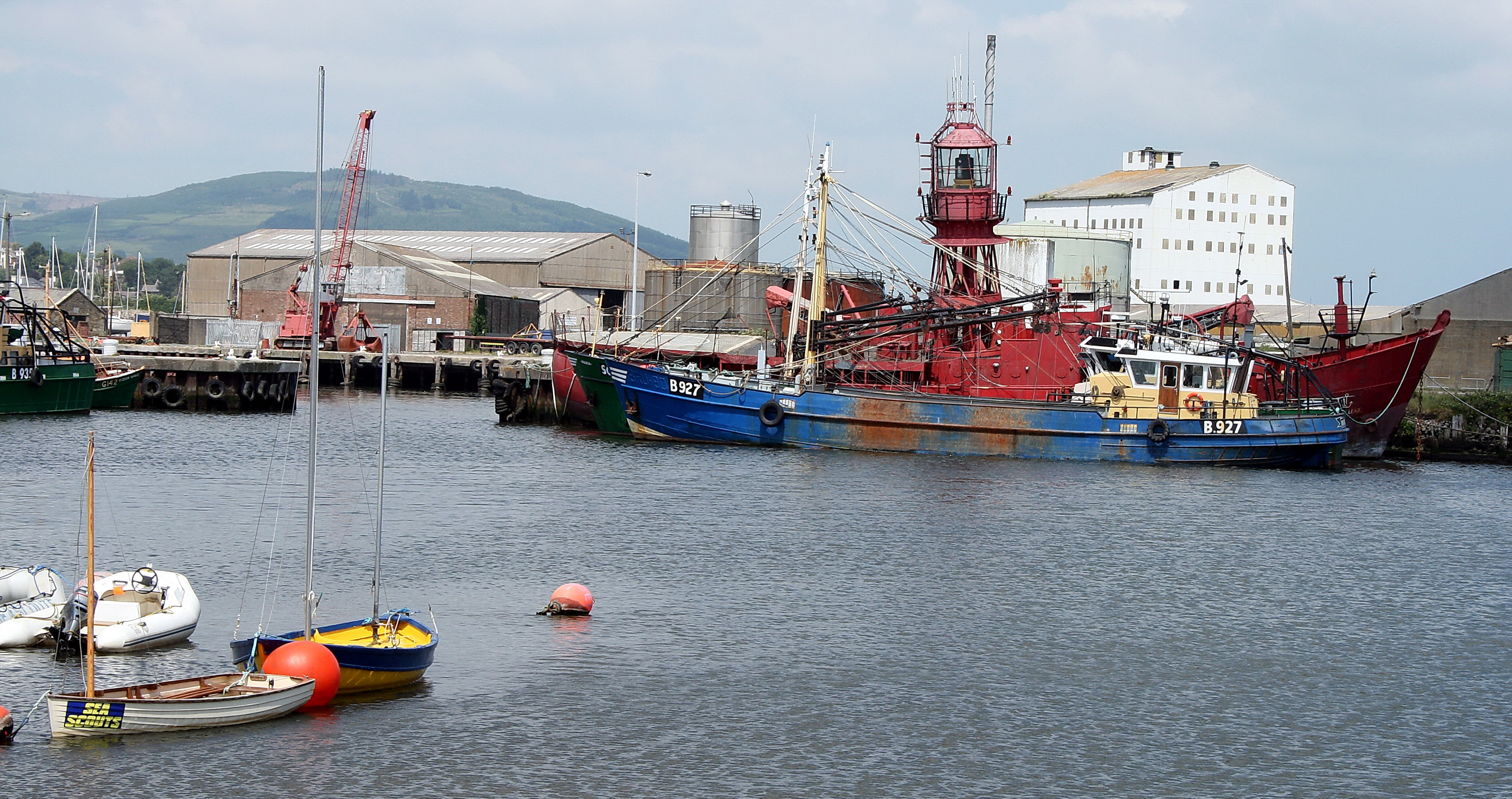
Arklow Port with the Hill in the background

== See also ==
- Wicklow Mountains
