= Welsh Rowing =

Governing body of rowing in Wales

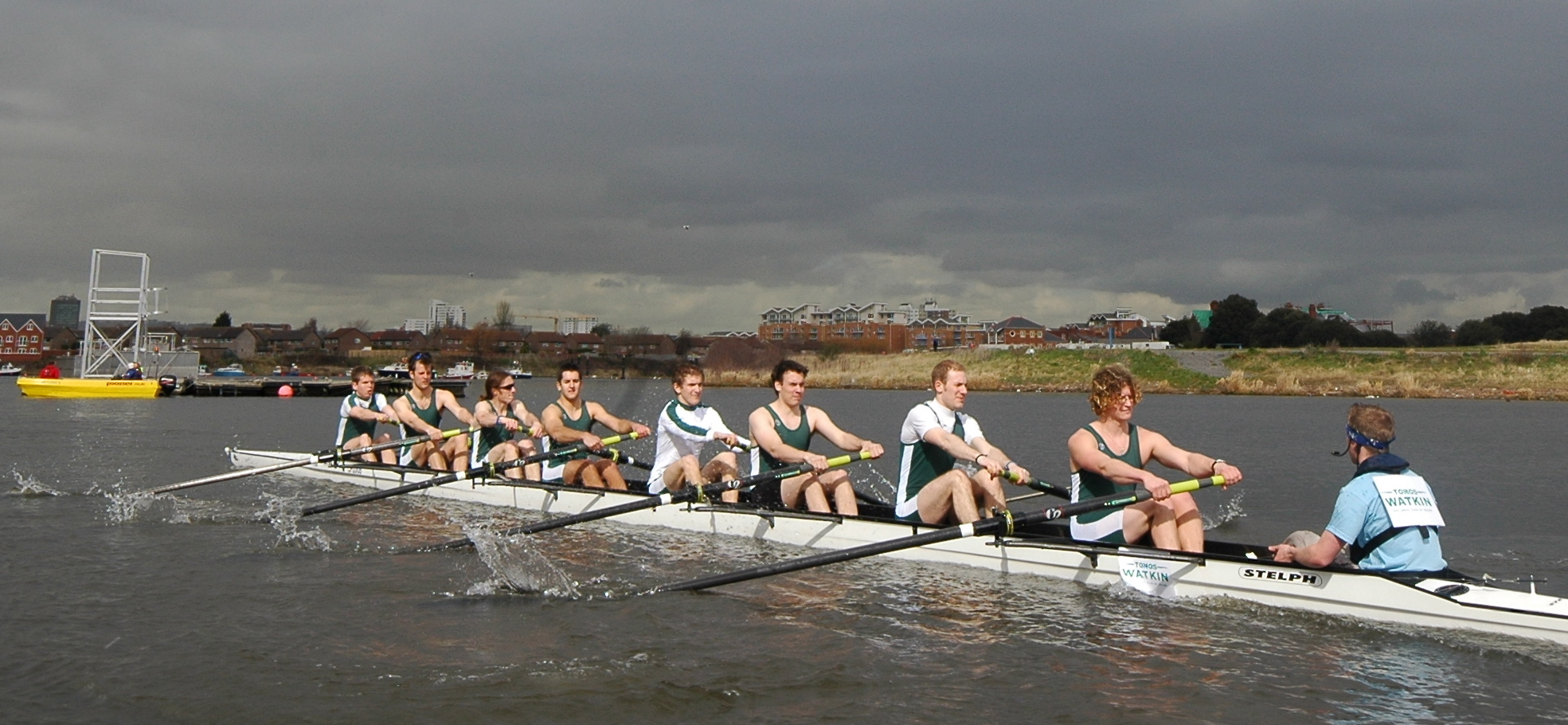
- Sport: Rowing
- Regional affiliation: British Rowing
- Headquarters: Cardiff
- President: Lord Moynihan

Official website
- www.welshrowing.com
- (Wales)

Welsh Rowing (formally known as the Welsh Amateur Rowing Association) (Welsh: Rhwyfo Cymru) is the governing body for the sport of rowing in Wales. It is responsible for promoting the sport in Wales, choosing crews to send to the Home Countries International Regatta and the Commonwealth Rowing Championships as well as progressing talented Welsh rowers along relevant pathways into the Great Britain trials and squads. It has 21 affiliated clubs, including schools and universities.

Welsh Rowing is based at the Sport Wales National Centre, and boats its athletes from the Channel View Leisure Centre, Grangetown Cardiff. Welsh Rowing host a British Rowing Start Centre, with two coaches, and aims to raise the awareness and participation of rowing within Wales. As well as river rowing and indoor rowing, Welsh Rowing works closely with the Welsh Sea Rowing Welsh Sea Rowing Association, which is the national association for coastal and ocean rowing clubs in Wales.

== Affiliated clubs ==
- Aberystwyth University Boat Club
- Bangor University Rowing Club
- Cardiff Bay Recreational Rowing Club
- Cardiff and Vale Schools Rowing Academy
- Cardiff City Rowing Club
- Cardiff Metropolitan University Boat Club
- Cardiff University Rowing Club
- Cardiff University Rowing Club Alumni
- Carmarthen Boat Club
- City of Swansea Rowing Club
- Clwb Antur Dyffryn Peris
- Fishguard and Goodwick Jemima Rowing Club
- Haberdashers' Monmouth School for Girls Rowing Club
- Llandaff Rowing Club
- Monmouth Comprehensive School Boat Club
- Monmouth Rowing Club
- Monmouth School Rowing Club
- Old Monmothians Rowing Club
- Penarth Rowing Club
- Swansea University Rowing Club
- University of South Wales Rowing Club

== World Class Start Centre ==
The Welsh Rowing World Class Start Centre is supported by British Rowing and is the only centre of its kind in Wales. To be considered for the World Class Start Centre promising athletes must meet the criteria (females must be 5 ft 10 in (1.78 m) or taller and aged between 14 and 22, and males 6 ft 2 in (1.88 m) or taller and aged between 14 and 20).

The current rowers within the Welsh Rowing World Class Start Centre are:

- Angharad Broughton
- Shereen Miers
- Ben Pritchard
- Andy Wallis

== Welsh and GB Representation ==
Over the years there have been many Welsh Athletes who have represented GB.

The current GB Senior Welsh Athletes are:

- Alice Baatz
- Tom Barras
- Josh Bugajski
- Beccy Girling
- Gemma Hall
- Zak Lee-Green
- Ben Pritchard
- Graeme Thomas
- Vicky Thornley
- Oliver Wynne-Griffith

== See also ==
- Welsh Sea Rowing Association
