= Arklow Pottery =

Pottery in Ireland

- Industry: Ceramics
- Founded: 1934; 91 years ago
- Headquarters: Arklow, County Wicklow, Ireland
- Key people: Seán Lemass
- Products: Ceramics

Arklow Pottery was an Irish pottery company which operated from 1934 to 1998. The company produced many decorative earthenware goods and general table crockery.

== History ==
Arklow Pottery was founded in 1934 and formally opened by Seán Lemass (Minister for Industry and Commerce) 29 July 1935 in South Quay, Arklow, County Wicklow.

After the Carrigaline Pottery, Arklow was the second pottery founded in the Irish Free State. When it opened, it employed 200 people. These included 15 local young women from a technical institute and 30 experienced professionals from Staffordshire Potteries. As there had been no historical ceramics industry in Ireland, the English workers were needed to train their Irish colleagues.

Early pieces has a strong English influence, by the 1940s the Pottery had developed "a distinctive Irish style." Earlier pieces featured 22 carat gold. The Dressier tunnel oven in the Pottery was thought to be the second largest in the world and could fire 20,000 to 25,000 objects every week. The ceramics featured both transfer and hand-painting.

Arklow Pottery ran into financial difficulties in the 1970s and was taken over by Japanese tableware company Noritake in 1977. After losses of more than £7.5 million over a 20-year period, the company ceased production in 1998, having closed a factory in 1985. At its peak the company had employed 480 people.

There is no definitive catalogue of Arklow back-stamps, and is collectable but not very valuable. Alongside everyday ceramics and tableware, the Pottery produced commemorative pieces. The most collectable Arklow pieces are from 1962 to 1969, when ceramist John ffrench ran the art pottery in the factory, Arklow Studio Pottery. An example of ffrench's work, an Arklow Pottery cup and saucer with Tiger stripes is held in the collections of the National Museum of Ireland.

== Gallery ==
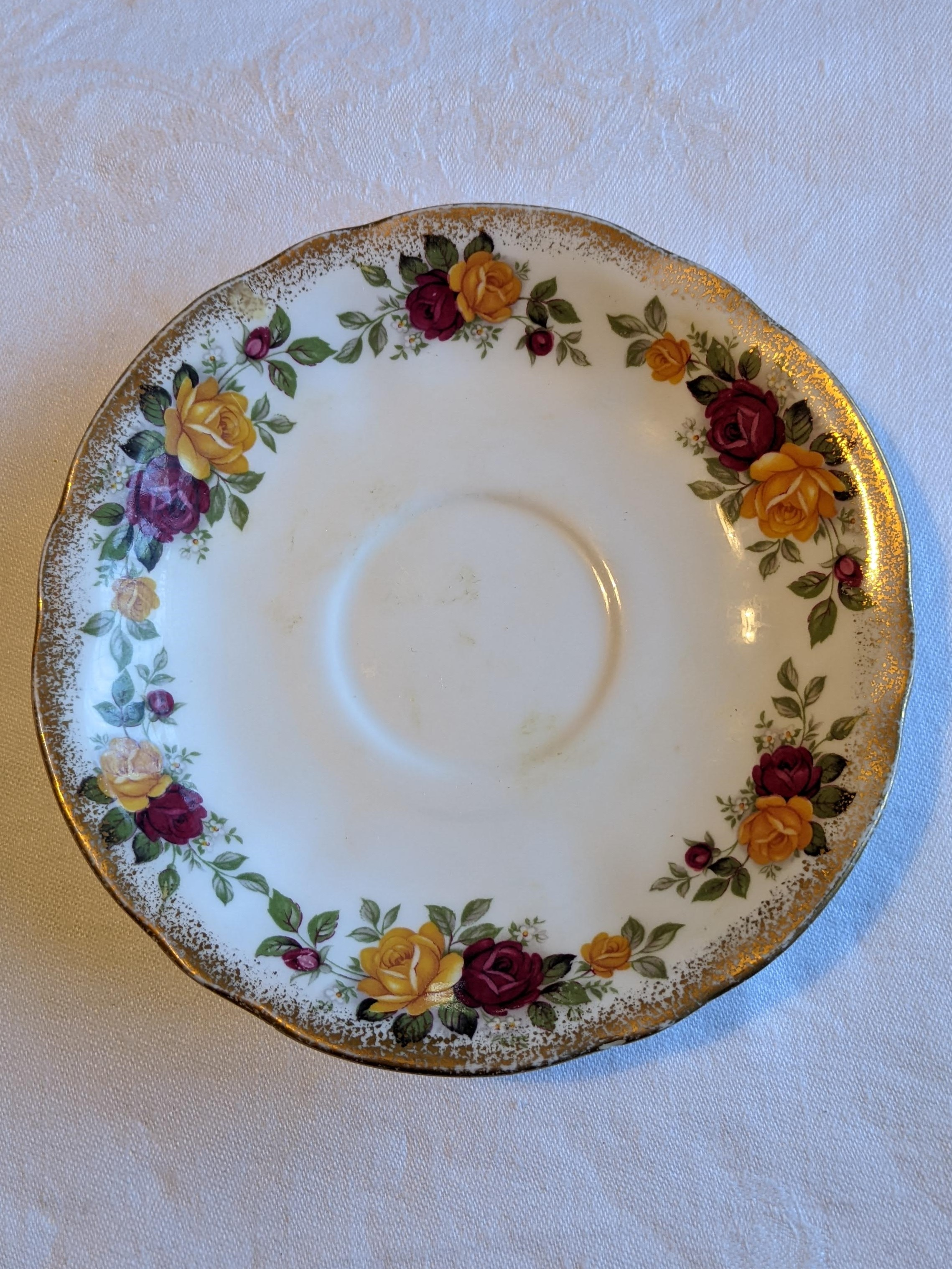
Cottage Rose series saucer

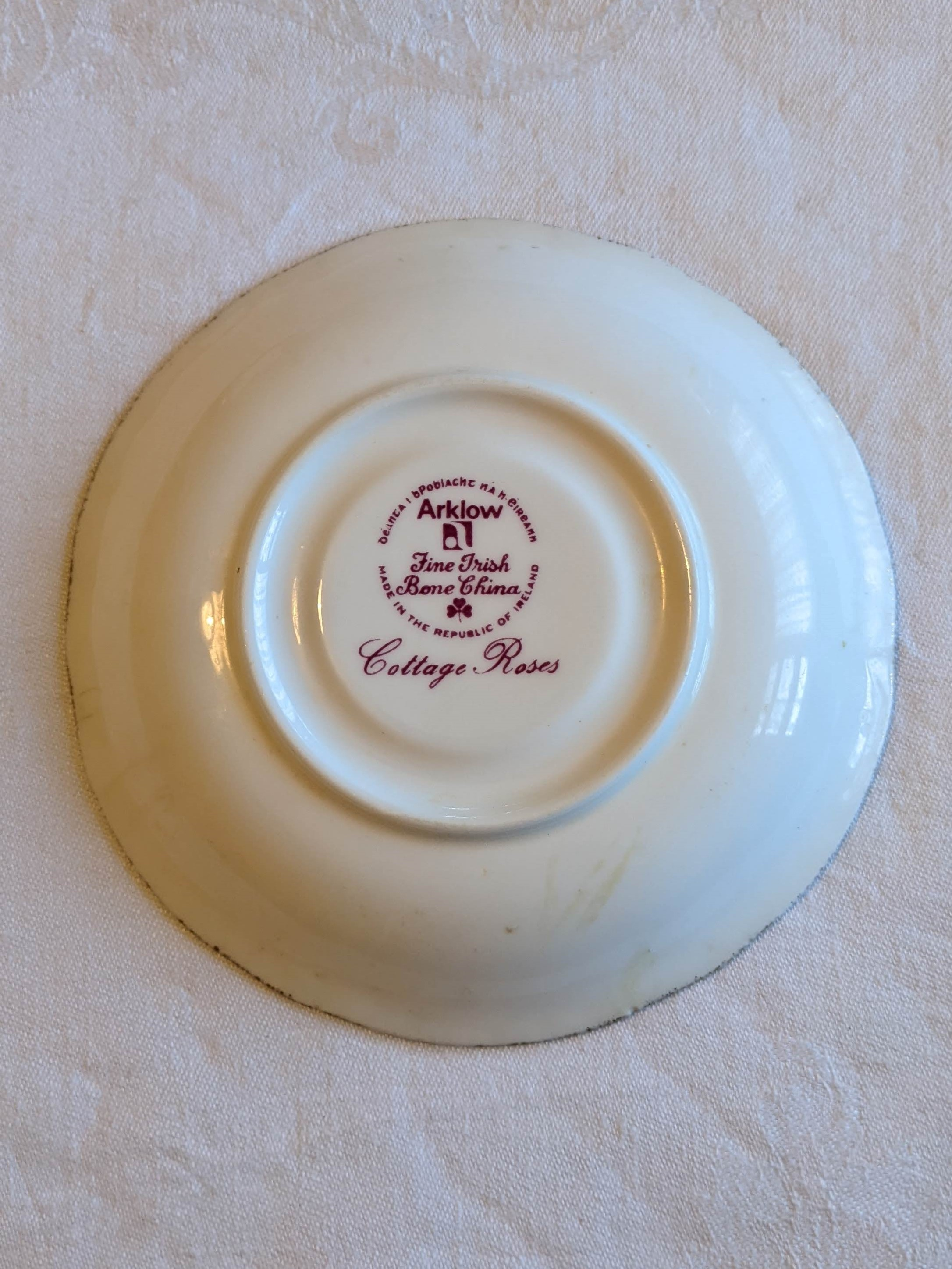
Cottage Rose series saucer reverse

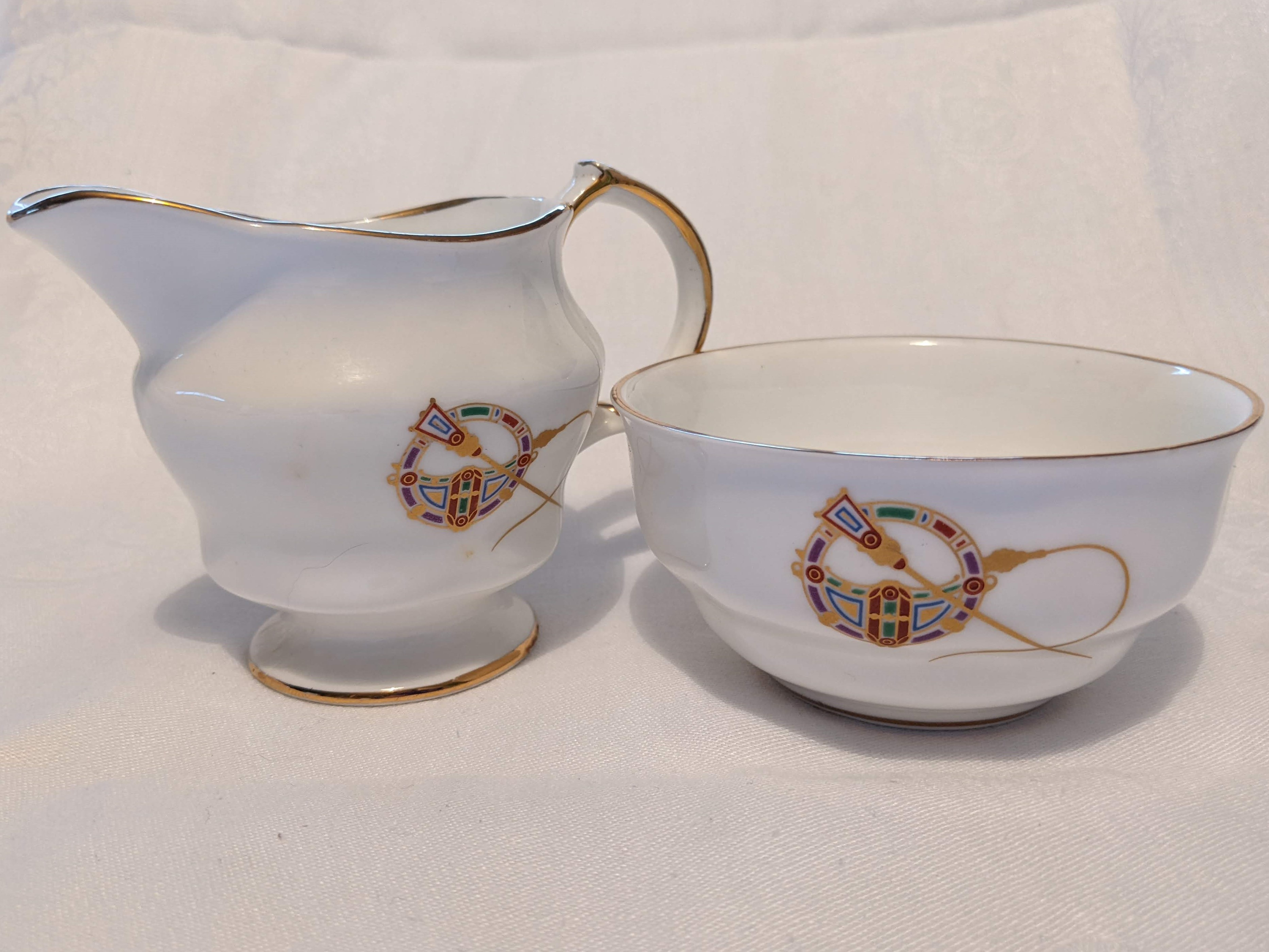
Tara Brooch series jug and sugar bowl

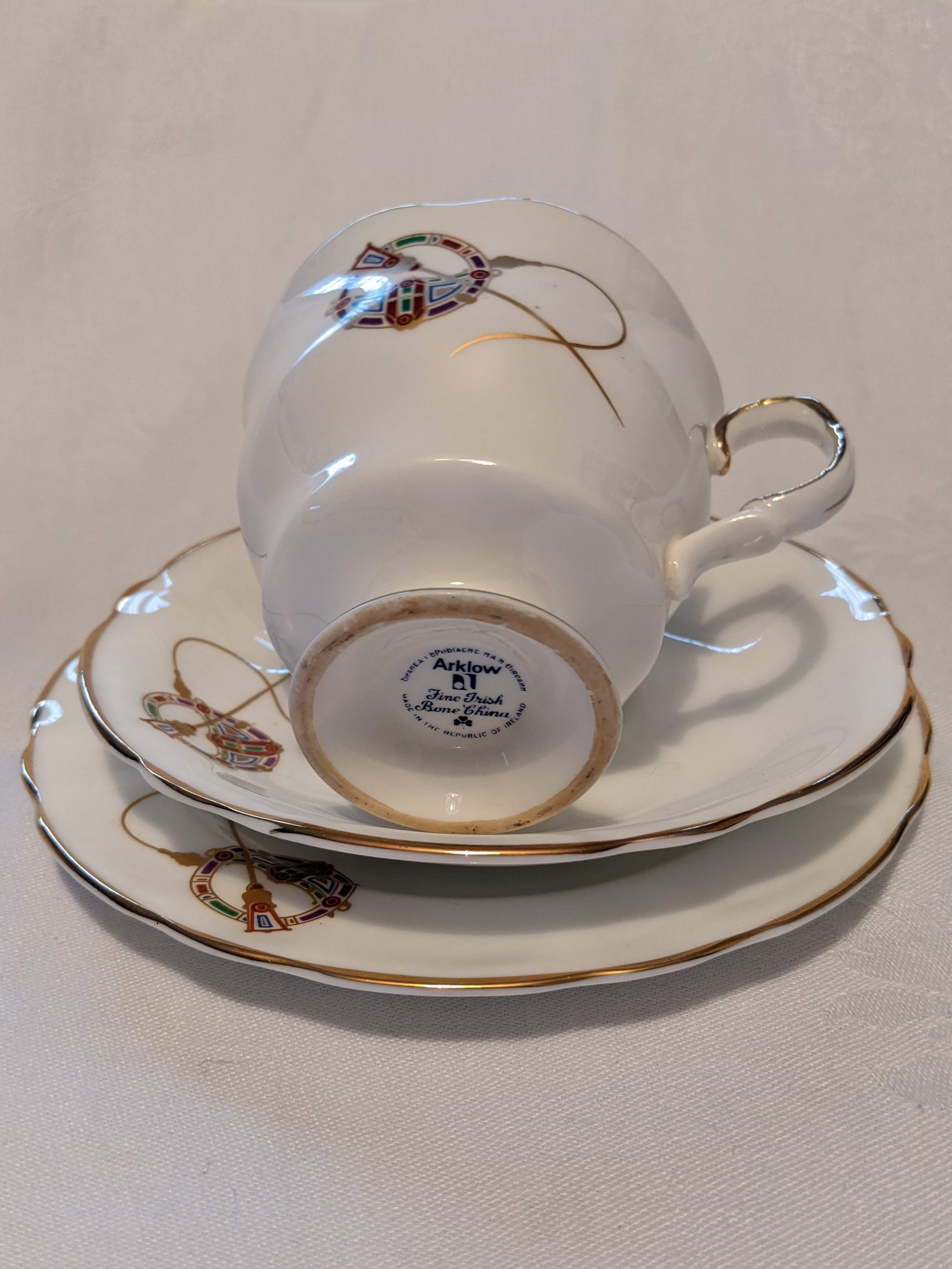
Tara Brooch series cup, saucer and side plate showing logo
