= Macmurroughs =

Townland in County Wexford, Ireland

Macmurroughs Fearann Mhic Mhurchú
- Townland
- Interactive map of Macmurroughs
- Coordinates: 52.413°N 6.922°W
- Country: Ireland
- Province: Leinster
- County: County Wexford
- Civil parish: New Ross

Macmurroughs is a townland in the parish of New Ross, County Wexford, Ireland. According to local tradition, it is named after Dermot MacMurrough, a 12th-century king of Leinster, who is supposed to have had a hunting lodge there. The lodge, if that is what it was, was destroyed during railway construction in the 19th century.
