= Celtic longboat =

Type of rowing boat

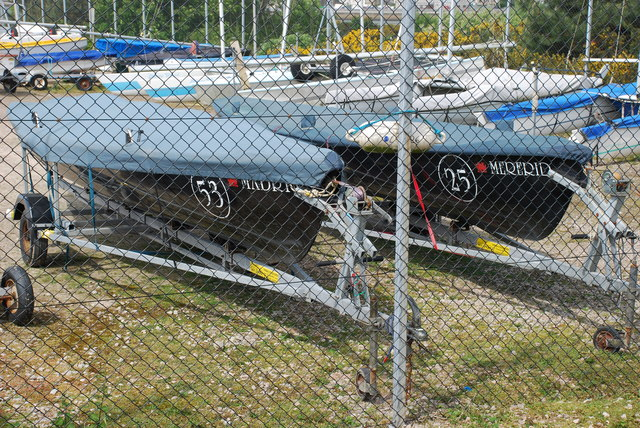
Cychod Hir Celtaidd - Celtic Longboats Madryn and Mererid are the two Celtic longboats belonging to Clwb Rhwyfo Pwllheli - Pwllheli Rowing Club. The crews regularly take part in races to Wicklow in western Ireland and back.

The Celtic longboat is a rowing boat used for coastal and ocean rowing, racing, training and recreation. It has four sweep-oared rowers and a cox.

Racing this type of boat has a long history on the West Wales coast.

Dale Sailing from Neyland was selected as the builder in 1999 and to date over 22 boats have been built (4 of which have gone to Dubai) with another 12 on order.

The Welsh Sea Rowing Association is the body that governs racing and oversees Celtic Longboat racing events. There are several Celtic Longboat Clubs throughout Wales.
