= Welsh Sea Rowing Association =

The Welsh Sea Rowing Association (Welsh: Cymdeithas Rhwyfo Môr Cymru) (WSRA) is the national governing body for coastal and ocean rowing in Wales. It is a member of Welsh Rowing (Welsh: Rhwyfo Cymru) and is represented at Welsh Rowing at board level and on the Performance, the Development, Coaching and Education, and the Events Sub-Committees. The WSRA is committed to the continued expansion and development of coastal and ocean rowing in Celtic Longboats and Yoles.

The WSRA is responsible for coastal rowing competitions in Wales, including the WSRA League, which has two racing categories: Celtic Longboats; and Yoles. The races include Junior, Senior, Veterans (40+) and Super Veteran (50+) for Men's, Ladies' and Mixed crews. The series of North and South League races were well attended in 2008 and 2009 and the dates and venues for the 2010 events were approved and published to their website. WSRA members enjoy an excellent range of races and also maintain an impressive safety record.

The Welsh Sea Rowing Association is based at Aberystwyth.

== See also ==
- Welsh Rowing
- British Rowing
