= Arklow =

Town in County Wicklow, Ireland

Arklow An tInbhear Mór
- Town
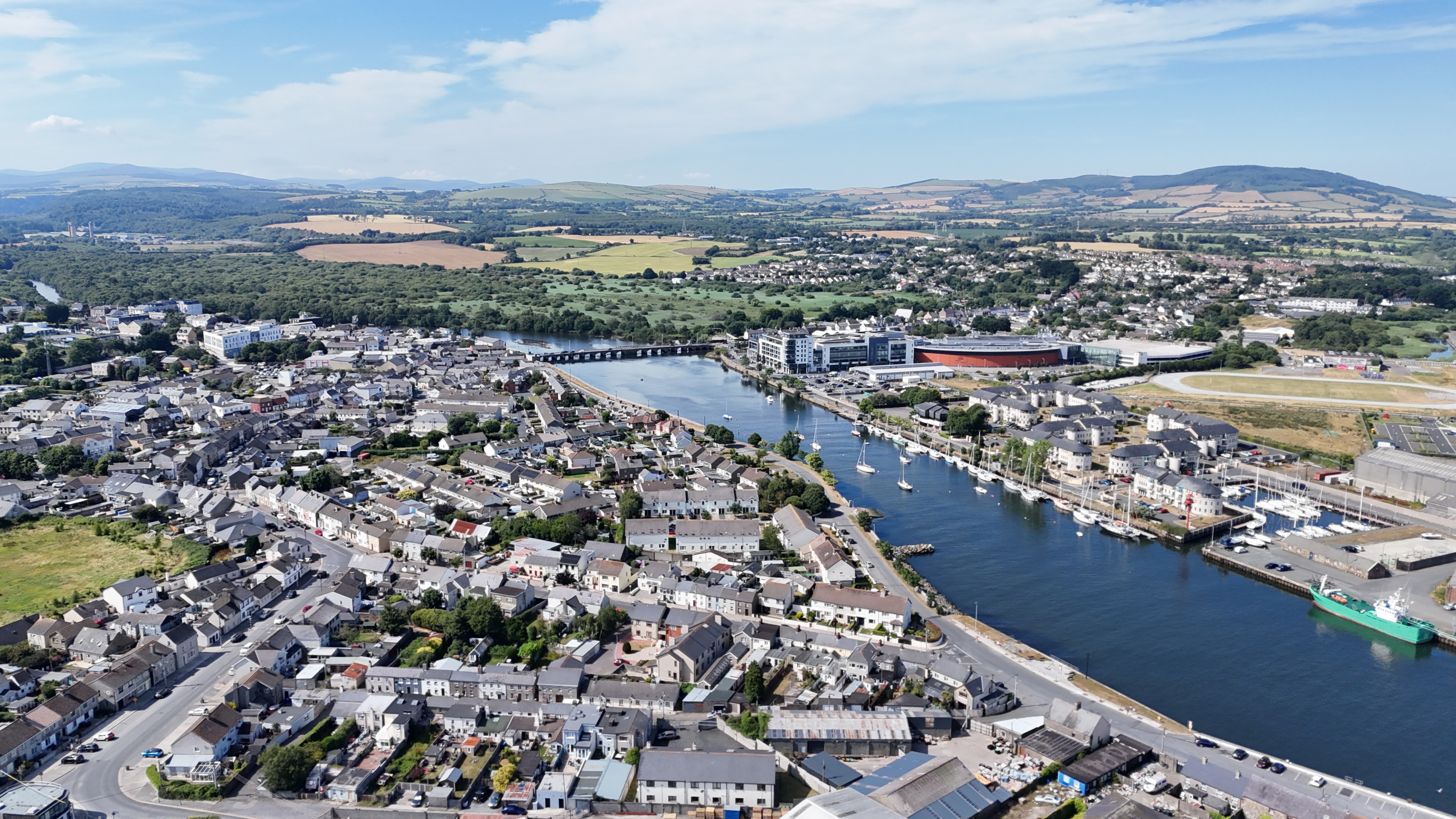
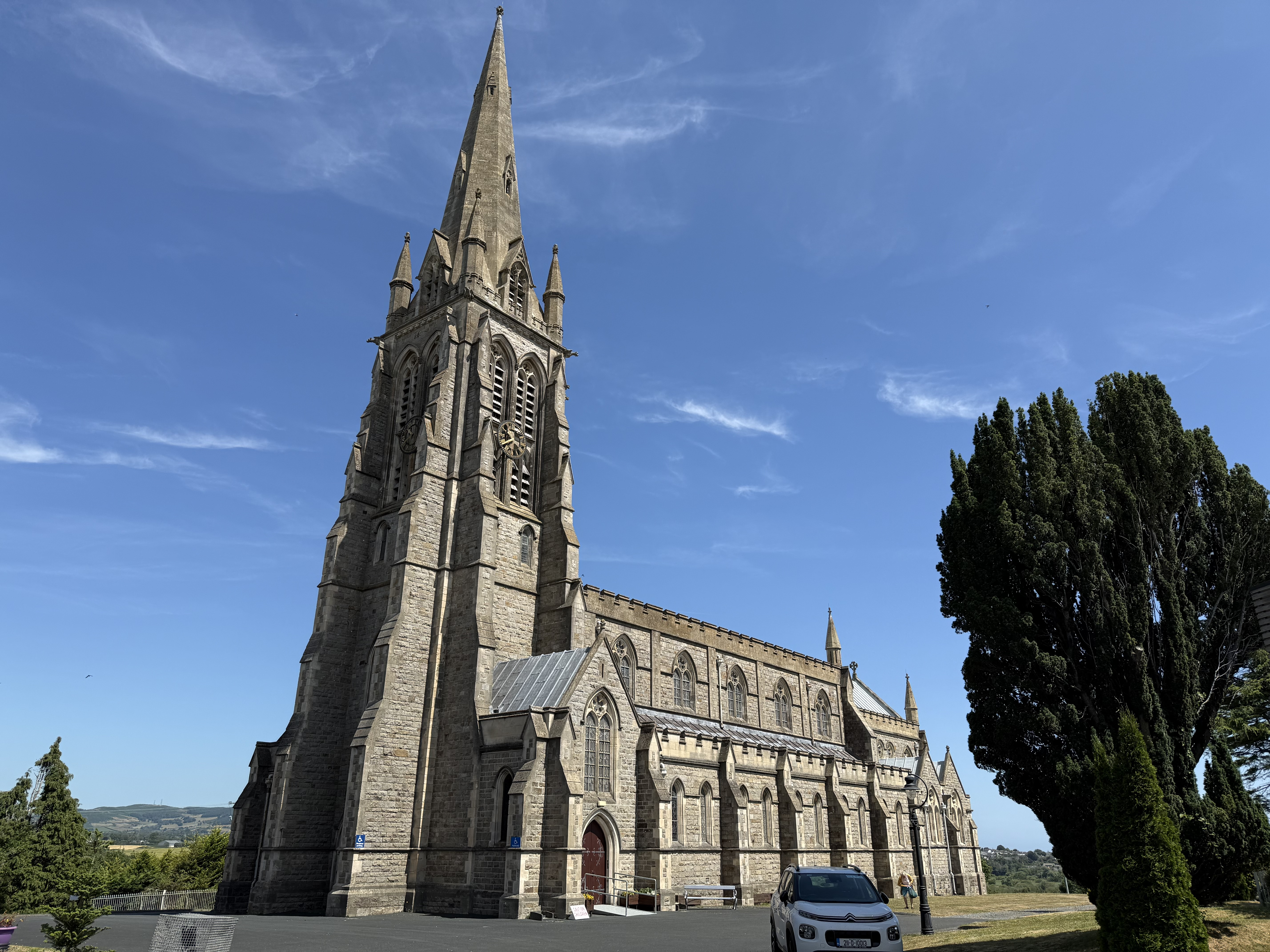
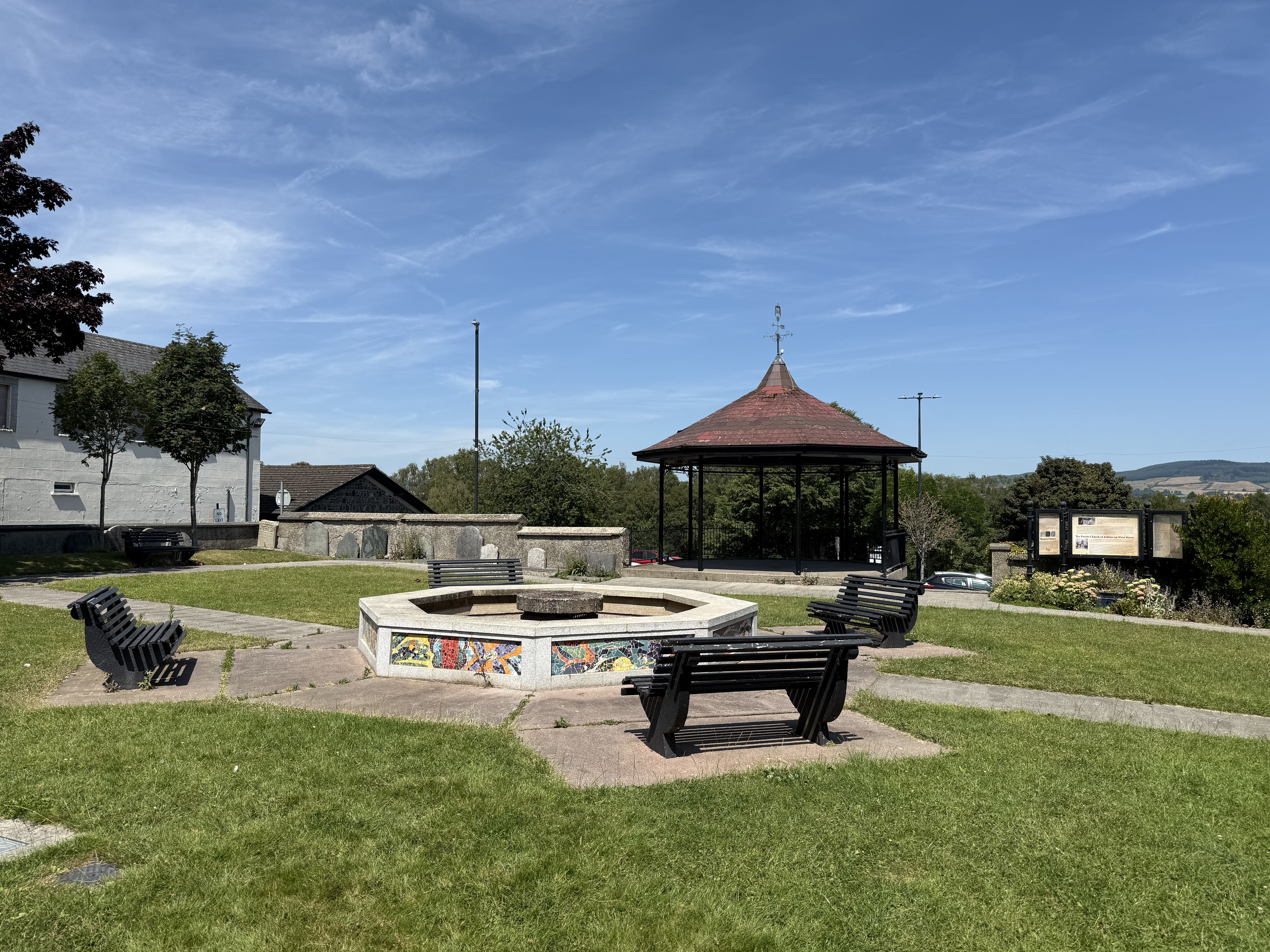
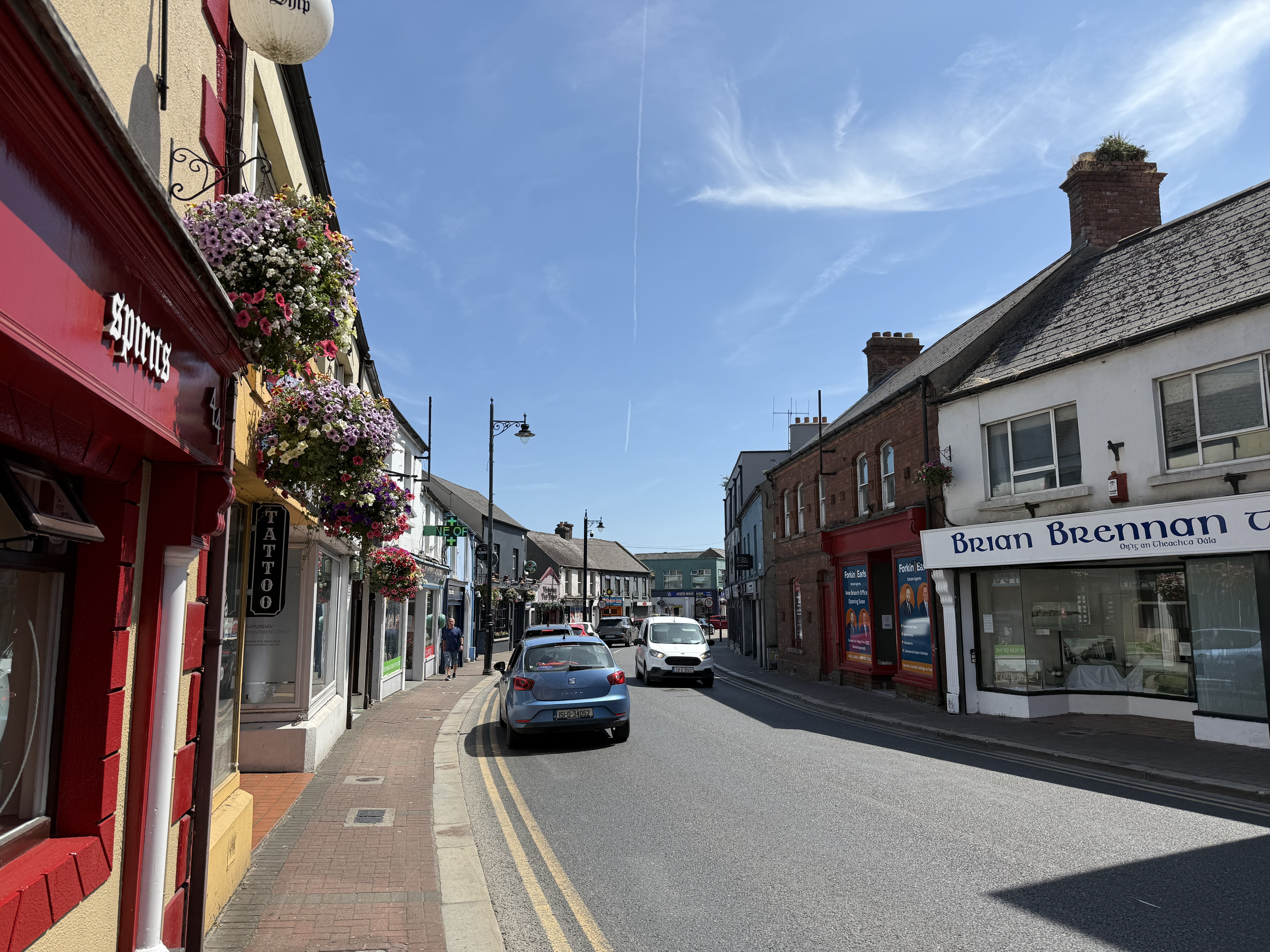
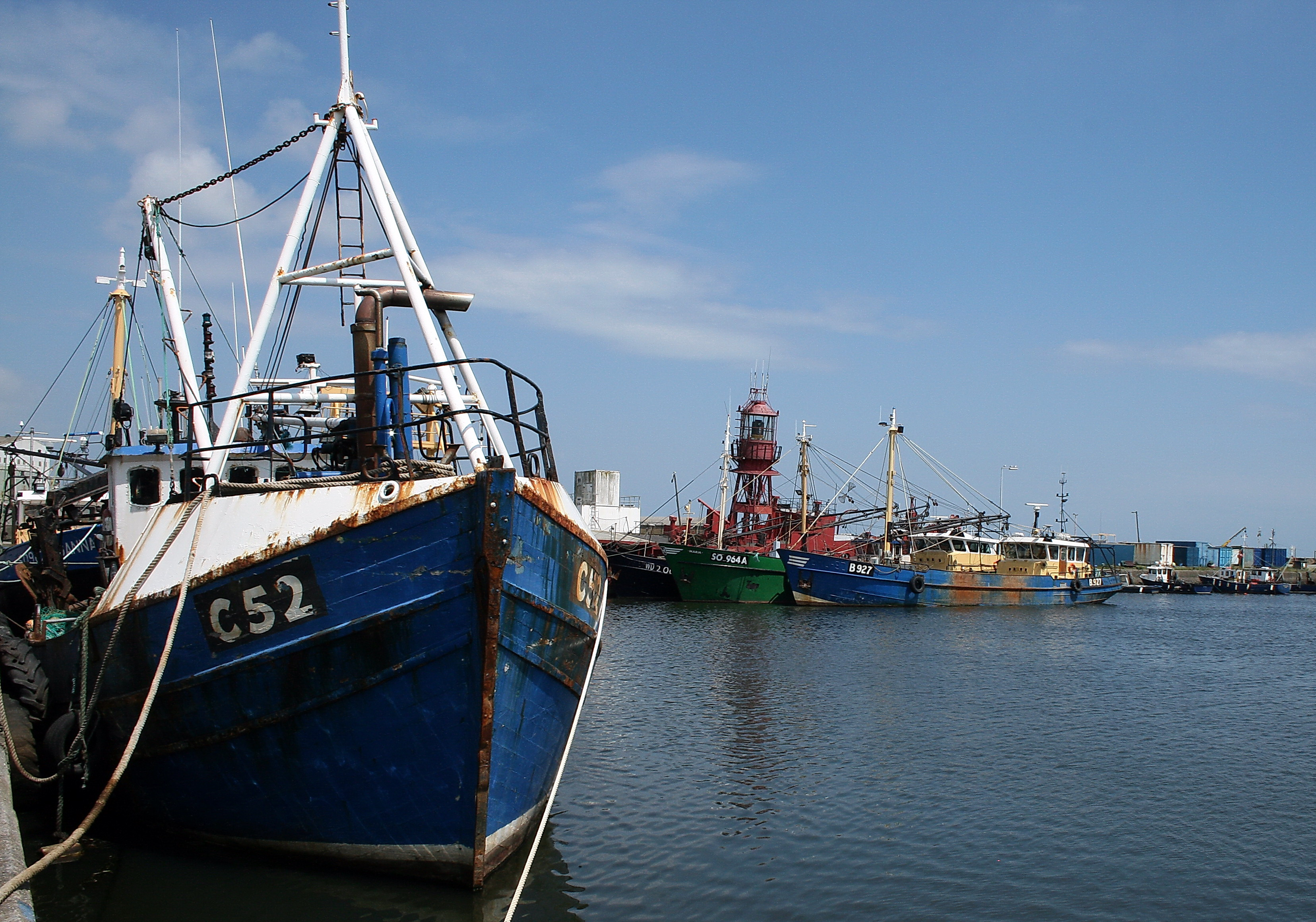
- Skyline of Arklow St Saviour's Church St. Mary's Park Cemetery Main Street Arklow Harbour

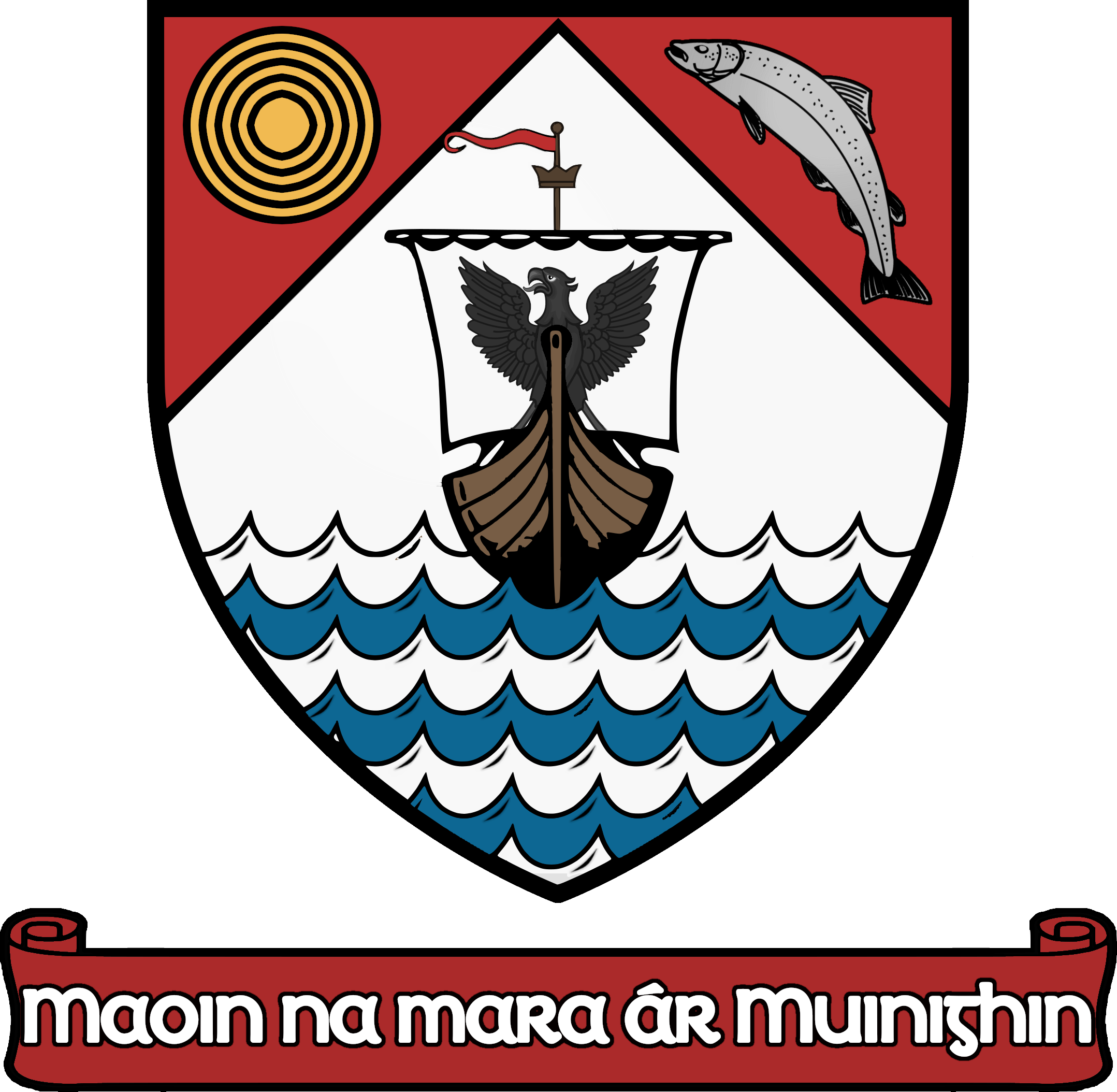
- Coat of arms
- Motto: Maoin na mara ár muinighin Our hope lies in the riches of the sea
- Location in Ireland
- Coordinates: 52.7941°N 6.1649°W
- Country: Ireland
- Province: Leinster
- County: County Wicklow
- Elevation: 20 m (66 ft)

Population (2022)
  - Total: 13,399
- Irish Grid Reference: T240735
- Website: www.visitarklow.ie

Arklow (/ˈɑːrkloʊ/ ARK-loh; from Old Norse Arnkell-ló 'meadow of Arnkell'; Irish: An tInbhear Mór, lit. 'the great estuary') is a town in County Wicklow on the southeast coast of Ireland. The town is overlooked by Ballymoyle Hill. It was founded by the Vikings in the ninth century. Arklow was the site of one of the bloodiest battles of the 1798 rebellion. Its proximity to Dublin led to it becoming a commuter town with a population of 13,163 as of the 2016 census. The 2022 census recorded a population of 13,399. The town is in a townland and civil parish of the same name.

Arklow is at the mouth of the River Avoca, the longest river wholly within County Wicklow. The town is divided by the river, which is crossed by the Nineteen Arches Bridge, a stone arch bridge linking the southern or main part of the town with the northern part, called Ferrybank. The Nineteen Arches Bridge is the longest handmade stone bridge in Ireland, and a plaque on the south end of the bridge acknowledges this.

== History ==
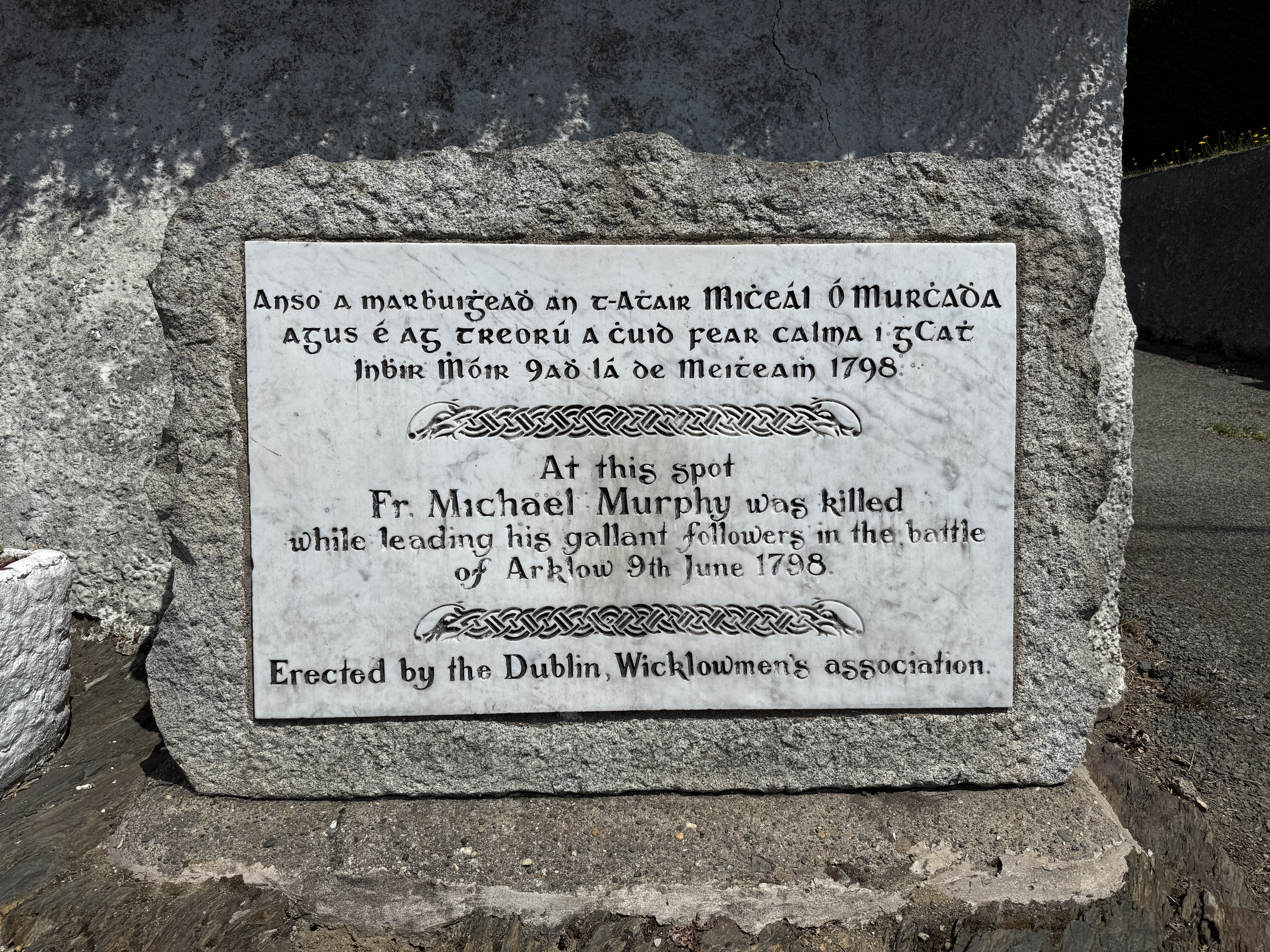
Michael Murphy, a leader of United Irishmen, was killed at the street during the Battle of Arklow

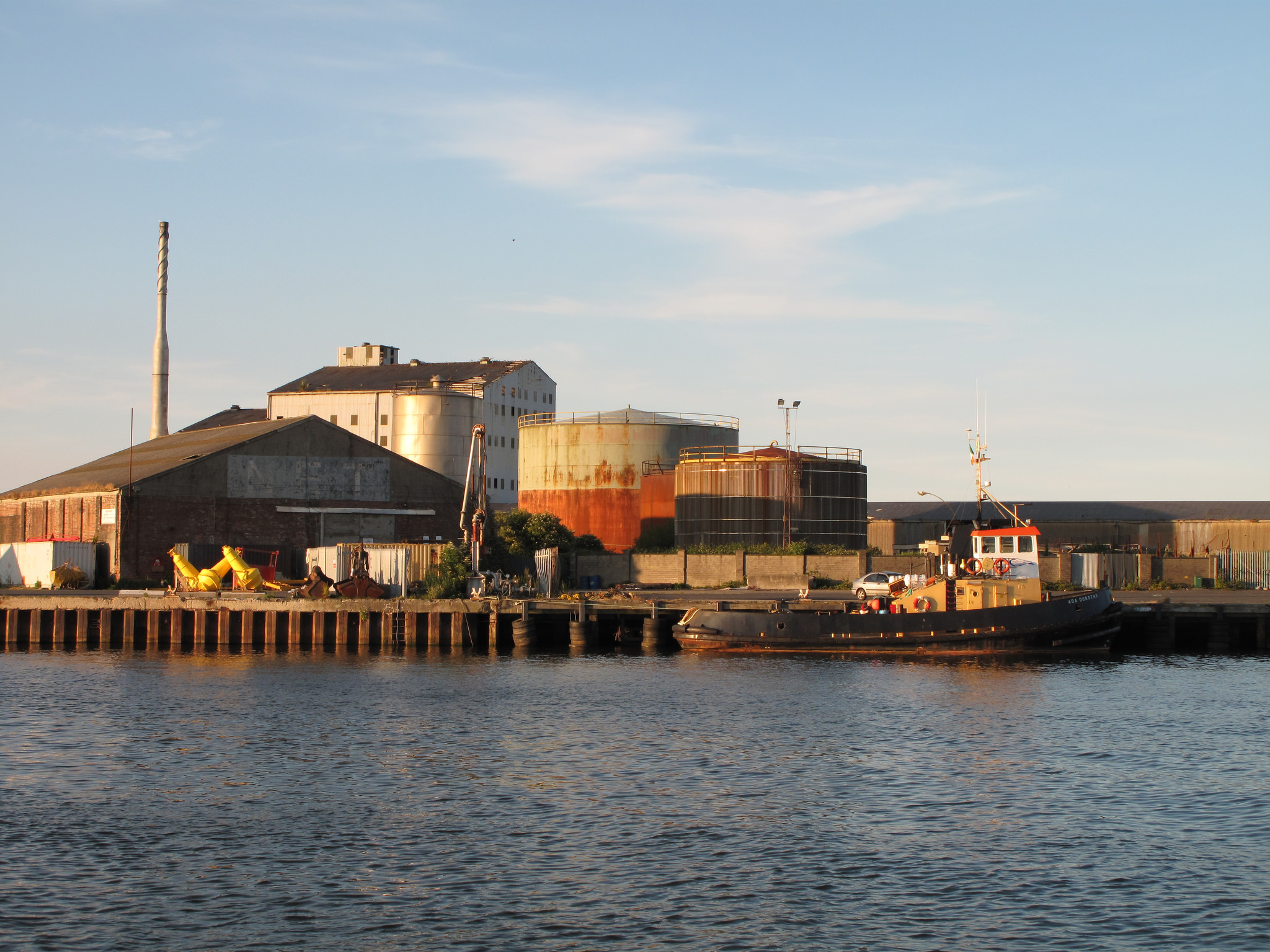
Arklow Port 2014

The town's English name derives from Arnkell's Lág (Arnkell was a Viking leader; a "lág" (low) was an area of land). Its Irish name, Inbhear Mór or An tInbhear Mór, means the large estuary. It is also known in Irish as Inbhear Dé, from the River Avonmore's older name, Abhainn Dé.

Historically it was a major seafaring town, with both the shipping and fishing industries using the port, with shipbuilding also being a major industry.

One of the first recorded mentions of the Arklow area concerns Palladius, the first bishop of Ireland who was recorded as landing at Arklow in 431.

After the arrival of the Anglo-Normans, their leader Theobald Walter, ancestor of the Earls of Ormonde, was granted the town and castle of Arklow by Henry II of England. In 1264 the Dominican Order was granted a large tract of land, now known as Abbeylands, where they built Holy Cross Abbey. Some time after 1416, the Manor of Arklow came into the control of the MacMurrough Kings of Leinster, possibly after the death of James Butler, 4th Earl of Ormond in 1452. In 1525, Muiris Kavanagh, King of Leinster from 1522 to 1531, returned Arklow and its lands to his nephew Piers Butler, 8th Earl of Ormond.

During the Irish Confederate Wars in November 1649, a skirmish took place outside Arklow when Royalist soldiers under Murrough O'Brien, 1st Earl of Inchiquin, ambushed English Commonwealth troops marching to reinforce Wexford. The attack was beaten off and an English garrison was installed in Arklow, while an attempt to retake the town by Irish Confederates in January 1650 failed.

In 1714, John Allen of Stillorgan, County Dublin, purchased the Manor of Arklow from James Butler, 2nd Duke of Ormonde, shortly before the latter went into exile as a Jacobite. In 1750, Allen's eldest granddaughter Elizabeth, married John Proby, 1st Baron Carysfort, who came into possession of the Arklow Estate as a result.

In the Battle of Arklow on 9 June 1798, one of the bloodiest events of the 1798 rebellion, a large force of Wexford rebels attacked the town in an attempt to spread the rising to Dublin but were repulsed by the entrenched British forces with many hundreds killed.

Arklow Courthouse served as the local town hall, until the new Arklow library and municipal offices in Main Street were opened in April 2016.

Population census

Year	Pop.	±% p.a.
1821	6,226	—
1831	6,511	+0.45%
1841	6,237	−0.43%
1851	6,122	−0.19%
1861	6,257	+0.22%
1871	6,377	+0.19%
1881	5,213	−2.00%
1891	4,482	−1.50%
1901	4,944	+0.99%
1911	5,042	+0.20%

Year	Pop.	±% p.a.
1926	4,535	−0.70%
1936	4,680	+0.32%
1946	4,915	+0.49%
1951	5,203	+1.15%
1956	5,292	+0.34%
1961	5,390	+0.37%
1966	6,083	+2.45%
1971	6,948	+2.69%
1979	8,451	+2.48%
1981	8,646	+1.15%

Year	Pop.	±% p.a.
1986	8,388	−0.60%
1991	7,987	−0.97%
1996	8,557	+1.39%
2002	9,959	+2.56%
2006	11,712	+4.14%
2011	13,009	+2.12%
2016	13,163	+0.24%
2022	13,399	+0.30%

== Education ==
There are five primary schools located in the town, St. Joseph's Templerainey, St Micheal's and St Peter's Junior School, St. John's Senior National School, Carysfort National School and Gaelscoil an Inbhir Mhóir.

There are four secondary schools within the town, which are St. Mary's College, St.Kevin's C.B.S., Glenart College and Gaelcholáiste na Mara.

== Transport and communications ==
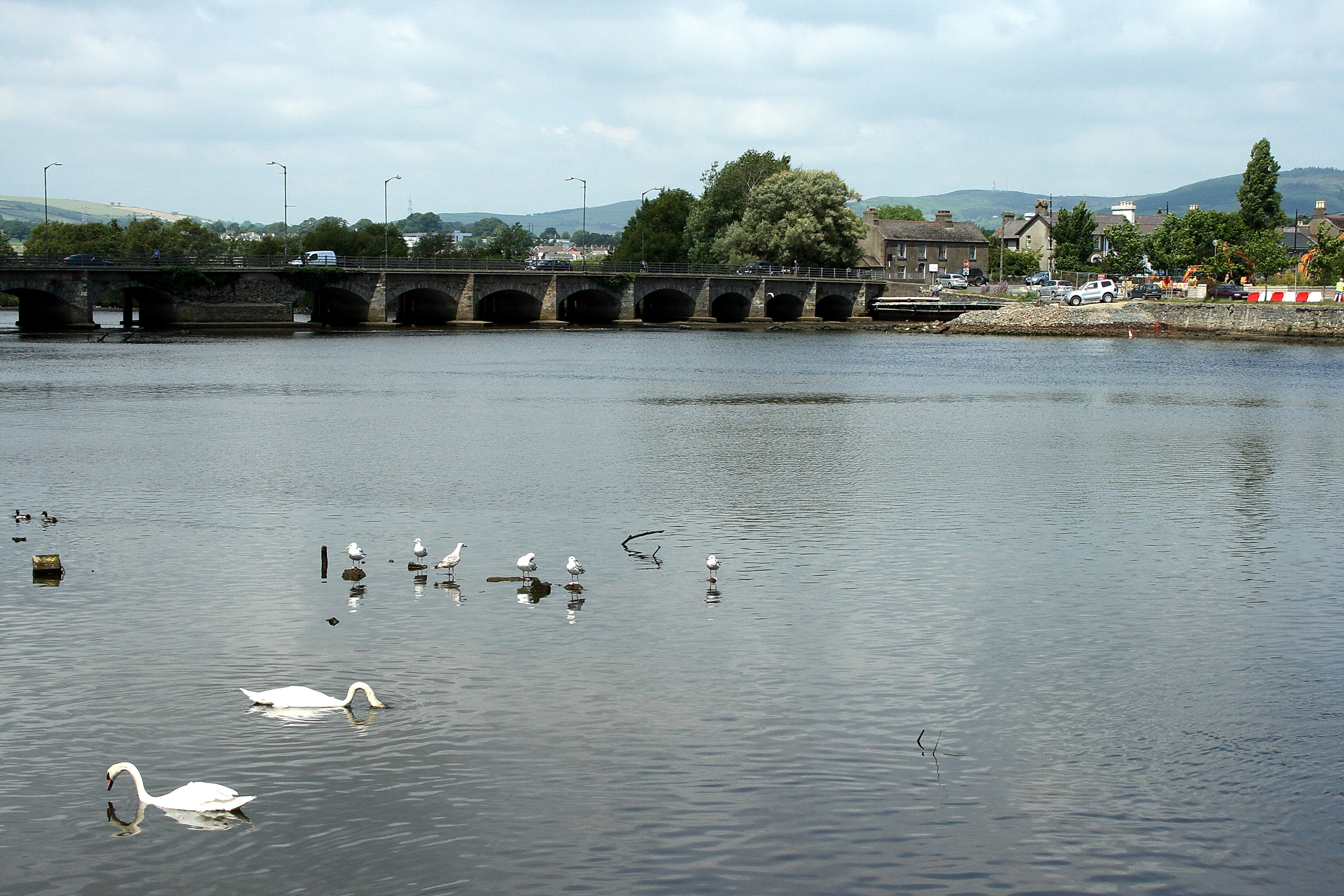
Avoca estuary and the Nineteen Arches bridge.

=== Road ===
The M11 from Dublin to Rosslare bypasses Arklow between junctions 20 and 21. A 16.5 km upgrade to the N11 between Arklow and Rathnew began in April 2014 and was completed in July 2015. This connected the then-existing M11 Arklow Bypass with the existing M11 Rathnew/Ashford Bypass creating a motorway from Dublin to Gorey. This project also included the construction of a service area on the M11 Northbound, just north of Gorey, with direct access from the M11 Southbound via an overpass.

=== Rail ===
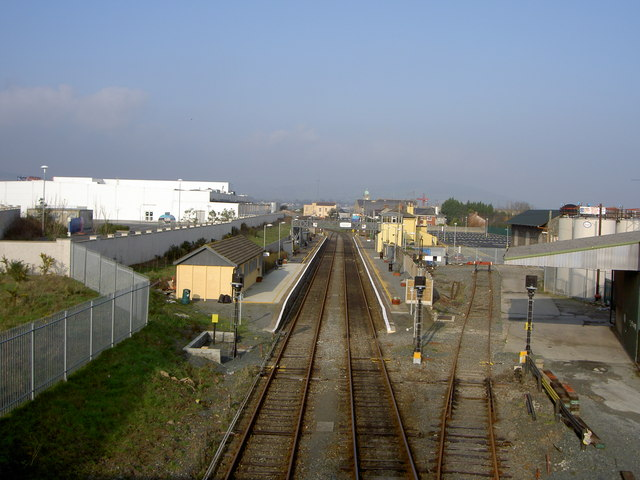
Arklow Railway station

Rail connections are provided by Iarnród Éireann along the Dublin-Rosslare railway line, including commuter and intercity services in and out of the capital. Arklow railway station opened on 16 November 1863.

=== Bus ===
Bus Éireann's routes 2 and 2X, as well as Wexford Bus's routes 740 (just outside of the town) and 740A, each connect Arklow to Dublin and its airport.

Wexford Bus also operates the UM11 service, during college term time only, which stops at the Old Dublin Road bus stop near Arklow and continues onward to the Intel campus via Maynooth University and Wicklow Town.

TFI Local Link operate the 183 service which runs between Arklow and Glendalough.

== Economy ==
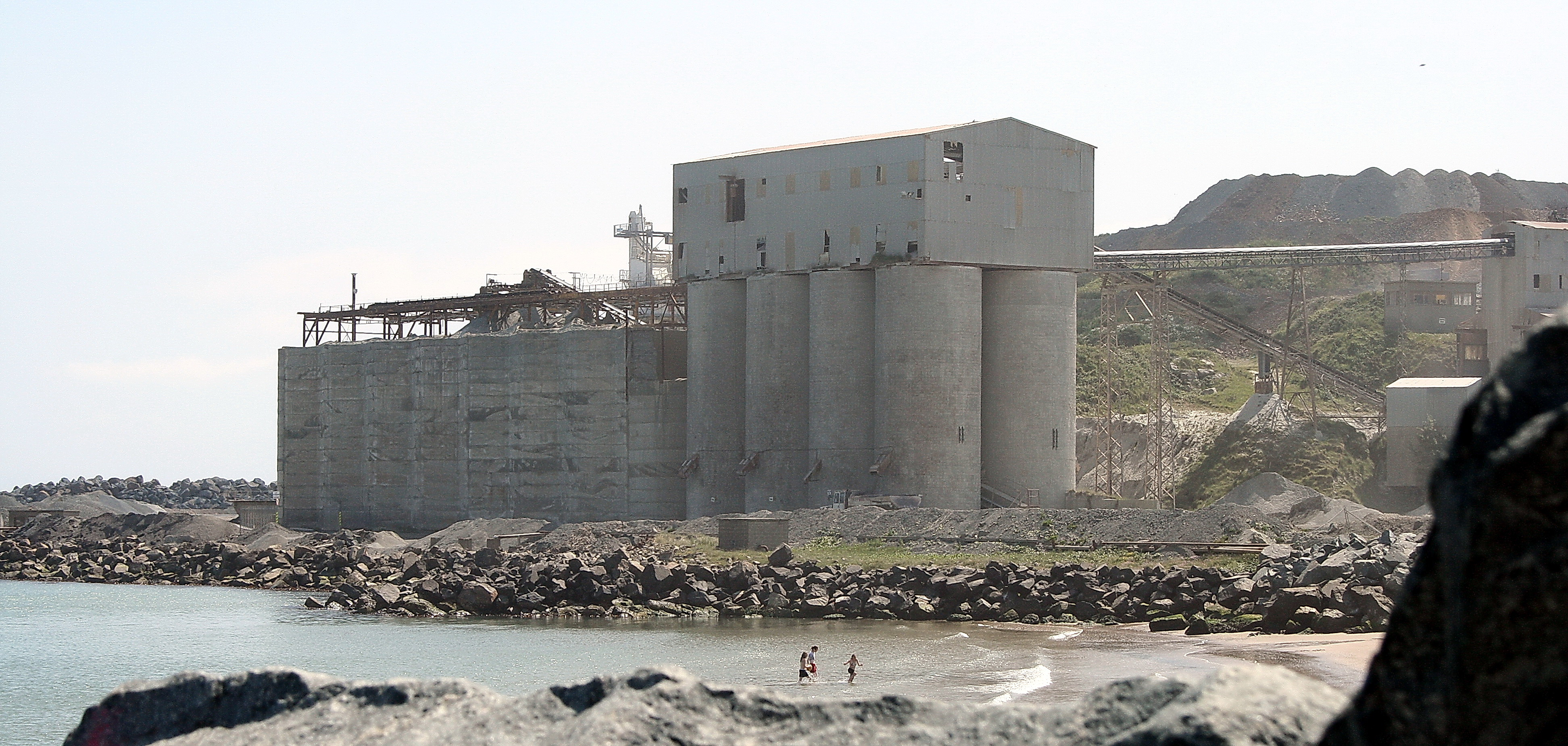
Quarrying at Arklow Rock

=== Fishing ===
In the 19th century, Arklow was used as a port for oyster fisheries, with 40 million oysters harvested from the surrounding oyster reefs in 1863. While numbers dropped significantly, due to intensive harvesting and pollution, as of 2021 the Native Oyster Reef Restoration Ireland (NORRI) group had been launched to encourage the reintroduction of oysters to the region. As of the 21st century, the fishing industry in Arklow mainly involves catches of whelks, mussels and herring.

=== Industry ===
In 1884, Charles Stewart Parnell rented Big Rock townland from his cousin William Proby, Earl of Carysfort, and commenced quarrying. Parnell was also a supporter of the Arklow harbour scheme. The Parnell quarries closed in the 1920s.

In the early part of the 20th century, a large munitions factory, Kynoch, was established on the north side of the town. This factory employed several thousand workers during the First World War but closed shortly after it, all production being moved to South Africa. 17 workers were killed in an explosion at Kynoch in 1917. The town is also historically known for its shipbuilding industry and pottery. The latter was produced at Arklow Pottery, which closed in 1998.

In the 1960s, a state-owned fertiliser factory, Nitrogen Éireann Teoranta, later Irish Fertiliser Industries, was established on the outskirts of the town. This factory complex comprised a number of chemical plants and manufactured a range of fertilisers from basic raw materials. It closed in 2002.

There is still an industrial base in Arklow, with Servier remaining as one of the manufacturing companies in Arklow. Allergan formerly had a plant locally, but this closed in 2009. In 2009, Elavon, a credit card processing company, purchased a new business site at Arklow Business Park. In 2019, planning permission was granted for a data centre at the Avoca River Business Park.

=== Shipping and shipbuilding ===
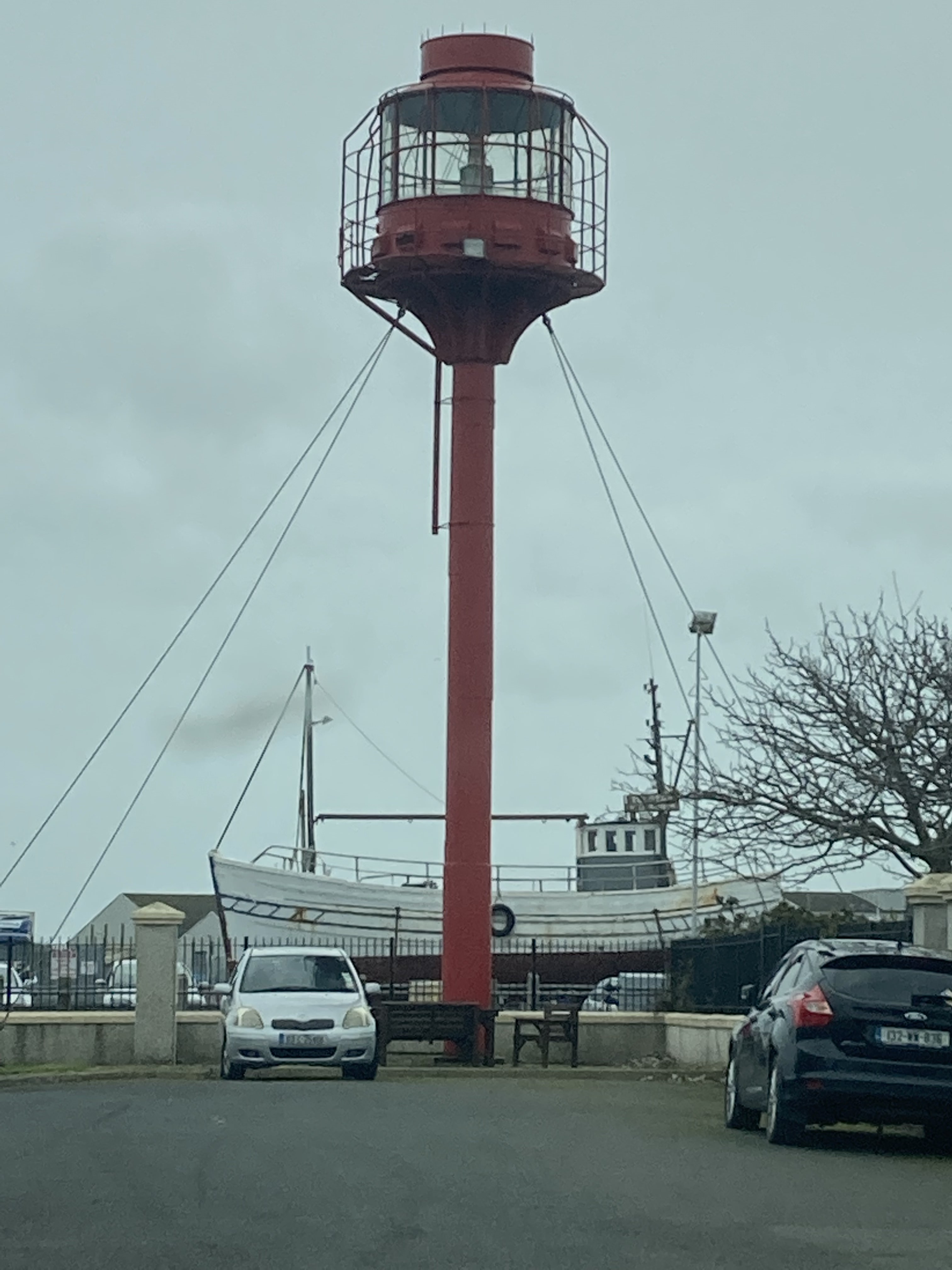
Arklow harbour beacon

The former national sail training vessel Asgard II was built by John Tyrrell & Son Ltd in Arklow. Another John Tyrrell & Son boat, Gipsy Moth III, was sailed to victory by Francis Chichester in the 1st Single-Handed Trans-Atlantic Race in 1960. His time of 40 and 1/2 days was 16 days faster than the previous record crossing.

While now more focused on leisure traffic than commercial traffic, Arklow Harbour remains the headquarters of Arklow Shipping, numerically the largest shipping company in Ireland. This company maintains a fleet of 56 cargo ships and a division in Rotterdam in the Netherlands.

=== Retail ===
Arklow services a large catchment area (including a number of surrounding towns and villages) and has approximately 32,000m^{2} of retail space. As of 2018, approximately 20% of this retail space was vacant. Among the town's largest retail centres is the Bridgewater Shopping Centre, which opened in 2007 and was sold in 2016 for €33.25 million.

== Environment ==
=== Water quality ===
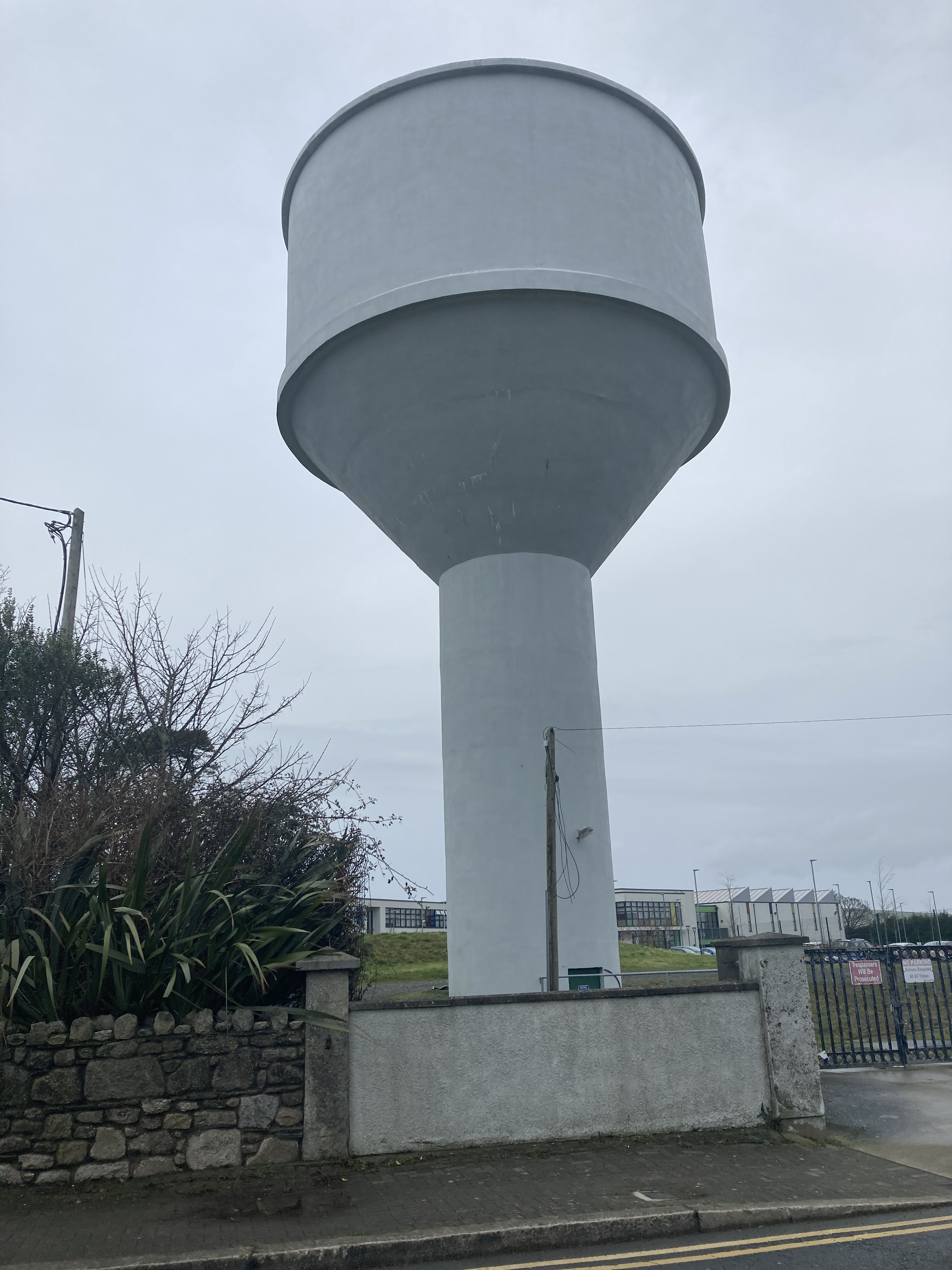
Arklow water tower

As of 2007, the River Avoca was classified as "seriously polluted" by the Irish EPA as a result of the discharge of sewage directly into the river in addition to a long history of industrial pollution in the area from early mining operations and more recent chemical industries. In previous centuries, Arklow was renowned for oyster beds.

Raw effluent from the town still travels through the drainage system built in the 1930s and 1940s, and entered the River Avoca untreated via several sewage outfall pipes along the river until the new wastewater treatment plant was opened in 2024. A sewage treatment plant had long been proposed for the area, and was first awarded planning permission in 1993. This was challenged unsuccessfully to An Bord Pleanála. However, subsequently no funding arrived from government, and the planning permission lapsed. Further ten-year planning permission was granted in 1999. This too was unsuccessfully challenged to An Bord Pleanála, with conditional planning approval given in 2005. In 2019, planning permission was again confirmed for a "high-tech" wastewater treatment facility, with construction commencing in August 2021. Construction of the plant was completed in Q4 2024.

The wastewater treatment plant, designed by Clancy Moore Architects, was nominated for the RIAI Public Choice Awards in 2025.

=== Services and development ===
A recycling centre is located in one of the town's industrial estates. It is run by Wicklow County Council.

A few kilometres into the Irish Sea is the Arklow Bank Wind Park. Opened in 2004, this wind farm consists of seven 106m turbines, with GE 3.6 MW generators. On 19 October 2022, one of the turbines was struck by lightning and severely damaged.

== Sports ==
The local Gaelic football club, Arklow Geraldines Ballymoney GAA, was founded in 1999 and is based at Pearse Park. Arklow Rock Parnells GAA club, founded in 1953, is primarily involved in hurling and camogie and plays at Parnell Park.

The town's association football clubs include Arklow Town F.C. (founded in 1948), Arklow United F.C. (Ferndale Park), and Arklow Celtic F.C. (Celtic Park).

Arklow Rugby Club plays its home games at The Oval, and Arklow Rowing Club is based on the town's South Quay.

St Benedict Inbhear Mór Athletics Club is registered with Athletics Ireland and based in Arklow. Arklow Lawn Tennis Club, founded in 1922, has three astroturf courts for use by members.

There is an 18-hole links golf course at Arklow Golf Club (founded 1927).

== Culture ==
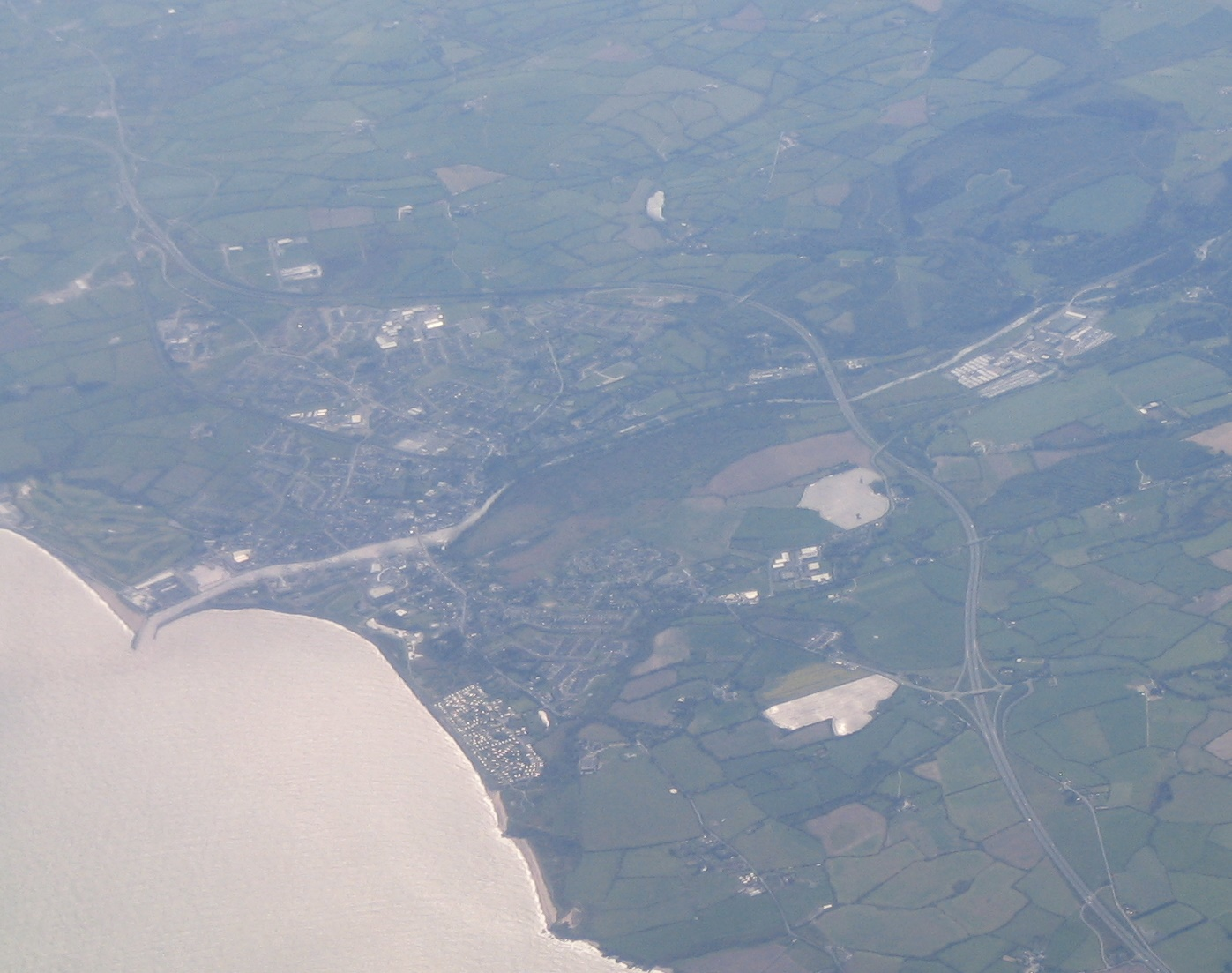
An aerial picture of Arklow

The Seabreeze Festival is a three-day event in mid-July. The festival includes a number of live shows and events at various venues throughout the town, ending in a fireworks display.

Arklow has been both the birthplace and place of residence for many artists such as George Campbell who was born there, the son of the self-taught artist Gretta Bowen.

Lilian Davidson drew sketches and painted scenes of the town and beaches. One such work, The Netter, Arklow depicts a scene of a man repairing a net by the harbourside with the harbour in the background; on the reverse-side of the painting is a sketch of children playing on the south beach.

The first permanent rainbow road crossing in the Republic of Ireland was unveiled in Arklow in December 2021. The pride colours run across the street at the traffic lights on Arklow's main street.

=== Music ===
Arklow is the title setting for Van Morrison's 1974 song "Streets of Arklow", one of eight songs he wrote on a three-week vacation back to Ireland, and featured on his album Veedon Fleece. The "Battle of Arklow" is a hornpipe and non-traditional set dance tune, and is often played at feiseanna and other Irish dance competitions.

Arklow is also the home town of pop singer and former Moloko member Róisín Murphy.

The Arklow Silver Band were featured on the track Red Hill Mining Town by U2, on their 1987 album The Joshua Tree.

The "Arklow Music Festival" is held in the town annually. It was established in 1970. The festival lasts a week and it involves people coming to compete from all around the country. They compete in solo forms and group forms.

== Administration ==
Arklow had a board of town commissioners created under the Towns Improvement (Ireland) Act 1854. This was a tier of local government below that of the county. The town commissioners became an urban district council in the early twentieth century. The urban district council became a town council in 2002. It was abolished by the Local Government Reform Act 2014, with the powers and functions of the town council transferred to the county council. However, they are administered locally by Arklow Municipal District.

The local electoral area of Arklow, which also contains the surrounding areas, elects six councillors to Wicklow County Council. The electoral divisions in Arklow consists of Arklow No. 1 Urban, Arklow No. 2 Urban, Arklow Rural, Aughrim, Avoca, Ballinaclash, Ballinacor, Ballinderry, Ballyarthur, Cronebane, Dunganstown South, Dunganstown West, Ennereilly, Kilballyowen, Kilbride, Kilpipe, Knockrath, and Rathdrum.

Arklow is part of the Wicklow–Wexford constituency for national elections and referendums, and South for European elections.

== Twin towns ==
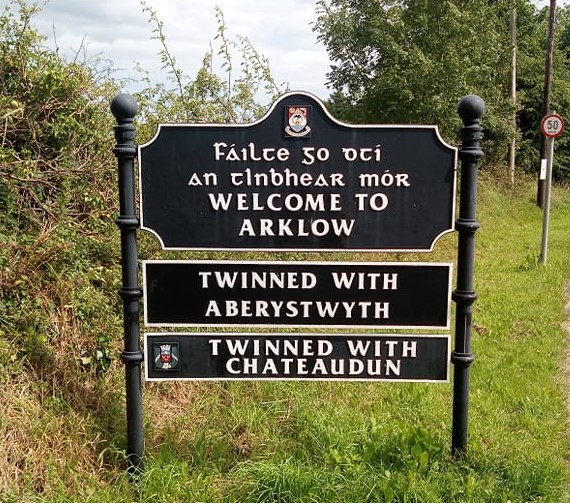
Welcome to Arklow sign with twin towns

Arklow is twinned with:

- Aberystwyth, Wales, UK
- Châteaudun, France

== People ==
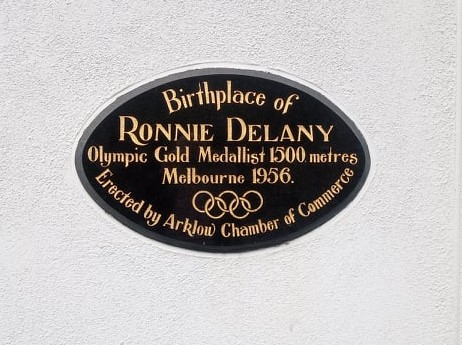
Plaque at 4 Ferrybank, birthplace of Ron Delany Olympic gold medalist

- Aaron Barry, professional football player
- George Campbell, artist and writer
- Ron Delany, won Ireland's last gold medal in track and field at the 1956 Olympics in the 1500m
- Ciarán Hyland, Gaelic footballer with Wicklow
- Teresa Kearney, teacher, Franciscan Sister, and missionary
- Nicky Kelly, politician and former Mayor of Arklow
- Richard le Blond, 14th century judge
- James Moore, professional boxer
- Róisín Murphy, singer-songwriter
- Oisín Stack, actor
- Mervyn Travers, Gaelic footballer with Wicklow
- Kate Tyrrell, shipping company owner and captain of the Denbighshire Lass (1863–1921)

== See also ==
- Arklow Maritime Museum
- Arklow Lifeboat Station
- List of towns and villages in Ireland
