= 2024 Wicklow Senior Hurling Championship =

Annual hurling competition season

- Dates: 5 July - 6 October 2024
- Teams: 6
- Sponsor: Lightning Protection Ireland
- Champions: Bray Emmets (10th title)
- Runners-up: Carnew Emmets
- Relegated: Glenealy

Tournament statistics
- Matches played: 17
- Goals scored: 47 (2.76 per match)
- Points scored: 480 (28.24 per match)
- Top scorer(s): Christy Moorehouse (3-59)

The 2024 Wicklow Senior Hurling Championship was the 112th staging of the Wicklow Senior Hurling Championship since its establishment by the Wicklow County Board in 1903. The championship ran from 5 July to October 2024.

Bray Emmets entered the championship as the defending champions.

The final was played on 6 October 2024 at Echelon Park in Aughrim, between Bray Emmets and Carnew Emmets in what was their fifth meeting in the final overall and a second successive. Bray Emmets won the match by 0–23 to 4–08 to claim their 10th championship title overall and a record-extending sixth successive title.

Christy Moorehouse was the championship's top scorer with 3-59.

== Team changes ==
=== To Championship ===
Promoted from the Wicklow Intermediate Hurling Championship

- St Patrick's

=== From Championship ===
Relegated to the Wicklow Intermediate Hurling Championship

- Avondale/Barndarrig

== Group stage ==
=== Group table ===
Knockout stage Relegated

Team	Matches				Score			Pts
Team	Pld	W	D	L	For	Against	Diff	Pts
Bray Emmets	5	5	0	0	114	72	42	10
Carnew Emmets	5	4	0	1	107	84	23	8
Kiltegan	5	2	0	3	106	91	15	4
Éire Óg Greystones	5	1	1	3	76	103	-27	3
St Patrick's	5	1	1	3	80	98	-18	3
Glenealy	5	0	2	3	81	116	-35	2

=== Group stage results ===
5 July 2024 Round 1	Kiltegan	3-10 - 4-11	Carnew Emmets	Echelon Park
	J Boland 2-0, K Conway 1-0, J O'Toole 0-3, S Germaine 0-3, M Murphy 0-2, B Ryan 0-1, C Harmon 0-1.	Report	E Kavanagh 0-6, W Kinsella 1-2, P Doran 1-1, A Myers 1-1, D Redmond 1-0, John Doyle Jnr 0-1.

6 July 2024 Round 1	Éire Óg Greystones	1-10 - 1-18	Bray Emmets	Greystones Grounds
	A Byrne 1-2, P O'Keeffe 0-3, S Cranley 0-3, M Walsh 0-1, E Blanchfield 0-1.	Report	P Doyle 1-1, C Moorehouse 0-4, D Masterson 0-4, D Maloney 0-3, L Maloney 0-2, C Lohan 0-1, D Henderson 0-1, M Lennon 0-1, R McMahon 0-1.

6 July 2024 Round 1	Glenealy	1-16 - 2-13	St Patrick's	Echelon Park
	G Hughes 0-5, A Driver 1-0, J Byrne 0-2, S Cruise 0-2, M Óg O'Neill 0-2, D Staunton 0-2, L Byrne 0-1, R Manley 0-1, R Byrne 0-1.	Report	A O'Brien 1-10, J Driver Jnr 1-0 (og), C Moorehouse 0-1, GB O'Brien 0-1, P Murphy 0-1.

19 July 2024 Round 2	Carnew Emmets	0-20 - 0-12	Glenealy	Echelon Park
	E Kavanagh 0-5, P Doran 0-4, A Myers 0-2, Jack Doyle 0-2, T Collins 0-2, John Doyle Jnr 0-2, W Kinsella 0-1, John Doyle Snr 0-1, K Cullen 0-1.	Report	G Weir 0-11, D Staunton 0-1.

20 July 2024 Round 2	St Patrick's	1-10 - 1-15	Éire Óg Greystones	Echelon Park
	A O'Brien 0-7, GB O'Brien 1-0, P Murphy 0-2, J Connors 0-1.	Report	J Cranley 0-9, A Byrne 1-2, P O'Keeffe 0-1, P Keane 0-1, S Kelly 0-1, A Bartec 0-1.

20 July 2024 Round 2	Bray Emmets	2-16 - 1-16	Kiltegan	Echelon Park
	C Moorehouse 0-9, M Lennon 1-2, E McCormack 1-0, D Henderson 0-1, D Lohan 0-1, D Masterson 0-1, P Doyle 0-1, R McMahon 0-1.	Report	J O'Toole 1-3, B Ryan 0-3, C Harmon 0-3, P O'Toole 0-2, E Byrne 0-1, J Boland 0-1, L Keogh 0-1, M Murphy 0-1, S Germaine 0-1.

27 July 2024 Round 3	Kiltegan	0-21 - 0-11	Éire Óg Greystones	Echelon Park
	J O'Toole 0-8, B Ryan 0-5, J Boland 0-2, S Germaine 0-2, E Byrne 0-1, L Keogh 0-1, M Murphy 0-1, P O'Toole 0-1.	Report	S Cranley 0-4, J Cranley 0-3, J Cahill 0-2, A Bartec 0-1, L Browne 0-1.

27 July 2024 Round 3	Carnew Emmets	2-16 - 2-11	St Patrick's	Echelon Park
	E Kavanagh 0-9, W Kinsella 2-1, John Doyle Jnr 0-3, D Redmond 0-2, P Doran 0-1.	Report	A O'Brien 0-8, GB O'Brien 2-1, C Moorehouse 0-1, BJ Connors 0-1.

27 July 2024 Round 3	Bray Emmets	1-22 - 0-13	Glenealy	Echelon Park
	C Moorehouse 0-8, M Lennon 1-2, D Masterson 0-4, P Doyle 0-3, R McMahon 0-2, D Maloney 0-1, E McCormack 0-1, L Maloney 0-1.	Report	G Weir 0-9, J Byrne 0-2, C O'Neill 0-1, D Staunton 0-1.

16 August 2024 Round 4	Glenealy	2-09 - 3-21	Kiltegan	Echelon Park
	G Weir 2-3, D Staunton 0-3, J Byrne 0-1, A Driver 0-1, J Driver 0-1.		S Germaine 2-3, B Ryan 0-6, K Conway 1-0, J O'Toole 0-3, C Harmon 0-2, J Boland 0-2, P O'Toole 0-2, L Keogh 0-1, A Daly-Danne 0-1, E Byrne 0-1.

17 August 2024 Round 4	Éire Óg Greystones	1-09 - 1-23	Carnew Emmets	Echelon Park
	M Walsh 1-0, P O'Keeffe 0-3, J Cranley 0-3, S Kelly 0-1, A Bartec 0-1, J Cahill 0-1.		E Kavanagh 1-9, W Kinsella 0-4, John Doyle 0-4, Jack Doyle 0-2, P Doran 0-2, D Alward 0-1, D Redmond 0-1.

17 August 2024 Round 4	St Patrick's	1-08 - 1-19	Bray Emmets	Echelon Park
	A O'Brien 1-5, T O'Brien 0-1, BJ Connors 0-1, J Connors 0-1.		C Moorehouse 0-11, J Anders 1-1, D Henderson 0-2, D Masterson 0-1, D Maloney 0-1, P Doyle 0-1, C Ó Dúlacháin 0-1, S Maloney 0-1.

8 September 2024 Round 5	Bray Emmets	3-15 - 1-13	Carnew Emmets	Echelon Park
	C Moorehouse 2-5, R McMahon 1-0, P Doyle 0-2, D Maloney 0-2, L Maloney 0-1, D Henderson 0-1, C Lohan 0-1, M Lennon 0-1, C Broderick 0-1, E McCormack 0-1.		E Kavanagh 0-7, P Doran 1-1, J Doyle Jnr 0-3, W Kinsella 0-1, J Doyle 0-1.

8 September 2024 Round 5	Kiltegan	3-08 - 4-08	St Patrick's	Echelon Park
	S Germaine 2-0, J O'Toole 0-5, C Harmon 1-0, E Byrne 0-1, B Ryan 0-1.		A O'Brien 2-7, GB O'Brien 1-1, P Murphy 1-0, M Connors 0-1.

8 September 2024 Round 5	Éire Óg Greystones	1-19 - 2-16	Glenealy	Pearse Park
	E Blanchfield 0-7, A Byrne 1-2, J Cranley 0-3, S Kelly 0-2, L Browne 0-2, M Walsh 0-2, S Cranley 0-1.		G Weir 0-10, G Hughes 2-3, D Staunton 0-2, T Doyle 0-1.

== Knockout stage ==
=== Semi-finals ===
21 September 2024 Semi-final	Carnew Emmets	0-14 - 0-11	Kiltegan	Echelon Park
	P Doran 0-5, K Cullen 0-2, J Doyle 0-2, John Doyle Jnr 0-2, A House 0-1, W Kinsella 0-1, J House 0-1.		B Ryan 0-5, J Boland 0-2, S Germaine 0-2, J O'Toole 0-1, M Murphy 0-1.

22 September 2024 Semi-final	Bray Emmets	2-17 - 0-09	Éire Óg Greystones	Echelon Park
	C Moorehouse 1-10, D Masterson 1-1, A Conway 0-2, D Maloney 0-2, E McCormack 0-1, S Lohan 0-1.		E Blanchfield 0-3, J Cranley 0-3, S Kelly 0-1, P O'Keeffe 0-1, M Walsh 0-1.

=== Final ===
6 October 2024 Final	Carnew Emmets	4-08 - 0-23	Bray Emmets	Echelon Park
	E Kavanagh (1-4, 4f), Jack Doyle (2-0), B Fitzgerald (1-0, f); P Doran (0-2, 1f); J House (0-1), F D’Arcy (0-1).	Report	C Moorehouse (0-12, 10f), D Masterson (0-4, 1f); E McCormack (0-2), B Nesbitt (0-2), A Conway (0-1), R McMahon (0-1), M Lennon (0-1).	Referee: J Keenan (Aughrim)

== Championship statistics ==
=== Top scorers ===
Overall

Rank	Player	Club	Tally	Total	Matches	Average
1	Christy Moorehouse	Bray Emmets	3-59	68	7	9.71
2	Andy O'Brien	St Patrick's	4-37	49	5	9.80
3	Eoin Kavanagh	Carnew Emmets	2-40	46	6	7.66
4	Gavin Weir	Glenealy	2-33	39	4	9.75
5	Jack O'Toole	Kiltegan	1-23	26	6	4.33

Single game

Rank	Player	Club	Tally	Total	Opposition
1	Andy O'Brien	St Patrick's	2-07	13	Kiltegan
1	Andy O'Brien	St Patrick's	1-10	13	Éire Óg Greystones
1	Christy Moorehouse	Bray Emmets	1-10	13	Carnew Emmets
4	Eoin Kavanagh	Carnew Emmets	1-09	12	Éire Óg Greystones
4	Christy Moorehouse	Bray Emmets	0-12	12	Carnew Emmets
6	Christy Moorehouse	Bray Emmets	2-05	11	Carnew Emmets
6	Gavin Weir	Glenealy	0-11	11	Carnew Emmets
6	Christy Moorehouse	Bray Emmets	0-11	11	St Patrick's
9	Gavin Weir	Glenealy	0-10	10	Éire Óg Greystones
10	Gavin Weir	Glenealy	2-03	9	Kiltegan
10	Gary Hughes	Glenealy	0-10	10	Éire Óg Greystones
10	Seánie Germaine	Kiltegan	2-03	9	Glenealy
10	James Cranley	Éire Óg Greystones	0-09	9	St Patrick's
10	Christy Moorehouse	Bray Emmets	0-09	9	Kiltegan
10	Gavin Weir	Glenealy	0-09	9	Bray Emmets
10	Eoin Kavanagh	Carnew Emmets	0-09	9	St Patrick's
