= 2026 Wicklow Senior Hurling Championship =

Annual hurling competition season

- Dates: 23 July - 4 October 2026
- Teams: 8
- Sponsor: Boom & Platform Hire
- Champions: Carnew Emmets (21st title)
- Runners-up: Glenealy
- Relegated: Avondale

Tournament statistics
- Matches played: 18
- Goals scored: 65 (3.61 per match)
- Points scored: 548 (30.44 per match)

The 2026 Wicklow Senior Hurling Championship was the 114th staging of the Wicklow Senior Hurling Championship since its establishment by the Wicklow County Board in 1903. The championship ran from 23 July to 4 October 2026.

Carnew Emmets are the defending champions. They defended their title after a 0-15 to 0-12 victory over Glenealy. This marks their first back-to-back title since 1981 and their 21st title in total.

== Team changes ==
=== To Championship ===
Promoted from the Wicklow Intermediate Hurling Championship

- Aughrim

== Group 1 ==
=== Group 1 table ===
Semi-finalist Quarter-finalist Relegation playoff

Team	Matches				Score			Pts
Team	Pld	W	D	L	For	Against	Diff	Pts
Glenealy	3	2	1	0	66	45	21	5
St Patrick's	3	1	2	0	81	58	23	4
Carnew Emmets	3	1	1	1	71	48	23	3
Avondale	3	0	0	3	47	114	-67	0

=== Group 1 results ===
24 July 2026 Round 1	Glenealy	2-11 - 2-11	St Patrick's	Echelon Park

25 July 2026 Round 1	Carnew Emmets	6-20 - 0-11	Avondale	Echelon Park

7 August 2026 Round 2	St Patrick's	1-16 - 0-19	Carnew Emmets	Echelon Park

8 August 2026 Round 2	Avondale	0-14 - 4-19	Glenealy	Echelon Park

22 August 2026 Round 3	St Patrick's	9-18 - 4-10	Avondale	Echelon Park

22 August 2026 Round 3	Carnew Emmets	1-11 - 1-15	Glenealy	Pearse Park

== Group 2 ==
=== Group 2 table ===
Semi-finalist Quarter-finalist Relegation playoff

Team	Matches				Score			Pts
Team	Pld	W	D	L	For	Against	Diff	Pts
Bray Emmets	3	3	0	0	105	58	47	6
Kiltegan	3	2	0	1	89	50	39	4
Éire Óg Greystones	3	1	0	2	53	76	-23	2
Aughrim	3	0	0	3	40	103	-63	0

=== Group 2 results ===
23 July 2026 Round 1	Aughrim	0-15 - 2-13	Éire Óg Greystones	Echelon Park

25 July 2026 Round 1	Bray Emmets	3-18 - 1-19	Kiltegan	Echelon Park

7 August 2026 Round 2	Kiltegan	5-25 - 0-08	Aughrim	Pearse Park

9 August 2026 Round 2	Éire Óg Greystones	0-19 - 3-25	Bray Emmets	Echelon Park

23 August 2026 Round 3	Éire Óg Greystones	1-12 - 2-21	Kiltegan	Echelon Park

23 August 2026 Round 3	Bray Emmets	7-23 - 2-11	Aughrim	Pearse Park

== Relegation stage ==
=== Relegation final ===
2 October 2026 Final	Avondale	0-11 - 1-09	Aughrim	Pearse Park
		Report

== Knockout stage ==
=== Quarter-finals ===
5 September 2026 Quarter-final	St Patrick's	2-11 - 0-15	Éire Óg Greystones	Echelon Park

6 September 2026 Quarter-final	Carnew Emmets	1-16 - 0-17	Kiltegan	Echelon Park

=== Semi-finals ===
19 September 2026 Semi-final	Bray Emmets	1-11 - 1-17	Carnew Emmets	Echelon Park
		Report

20 September 2026 Semi-final	Glenealy	2-14 - 1-16	St Patrick's	Echelon Park
		Report

=== Final ===
4 October 2026 Final	Glenealy	0-12 - 0-15	Carnew Emmets	Echelon Park
		Report
