= 2025 Wicklow Senior Hurling Championship =

Annual hurling competition season

- Dates: 18 July - 12 October 2025
- Teams: 7
- Sponsor: Boom & Platform Hire
- Champions: Carnew Emmets (20th title); Thomas Collins (captain); Éamonn Scallan (manager)
- Runners-up: Bray Emmets; Pádraig Doyle (captain); Ronan O'Brien (manager)

Tournament statistics
- Matches played: 14
- Goals scored: 37 (2.64 per match)
- Points scored: 440 (31.43 per match)

The 2025 Wicklow Senior Hurling Championship was the 113th staging of the Wicklow Senior Hurling Championship since its establishment by the Wicklow County Board in 1903. The championship ran from 18 July to 12 October 2025.

Bray Emmets entered the championship as the defending champions.

The final was played on 12 October 2025 at Echelon Park in Aughrim, between Carnew Emmets and Bray Emmets in what was their sixth meeting in the final overall and a third successive meeting. Carnew Emmets won the match by 0-16 to 2-08 to claim their 20th championship title overall and a first championship title in 16 years.

== Team changes ==
=== To Championship ===
Promoted from the Wicklow Intermediate Hurling Championship

- Avondale

== Group 1 ==
=== Group 1 table ===
Semi-finalist Quarter-finalist

| Team | Matches | | | | Score | | | Pts |
| Team | Pld | W | D | L | For | Against | Diff | Pts |
|---|---|---|---|---|---|---|---|---|
| Carnew Emmets | 3 | 2 | 0 | 1 | 77 | 48 | 29 | 4 |
| Kiltegan | 3 | 2 | 0 | 1 | 63 | 49 | 14 | 4 |
| Glenealy | 3 | 2 | 0 | 1 | 56 | 68 | -12 | 4 |
| Éire Óg Greystones | 3 | 0 | 0 | 3 | 48 | 79 | -31 | 0 |

=== Group 1 table ===
| 18 July 2025 Round 1 | Carnew Emmets | 2-10 - 1-17 | Kiltegan | Echelon Park |

| 19 July 2025 Round 1 | Glenealy | 2-19 - 2-12 | Éire Óg Greystones | Echelon Park |

| 15 August 2025 Round 2 | Kiltegan | 1-15 - 2-13 | Glenealy | Echelon Park |

| 16 August 2025 Round 2 | Éire Óg Greystones | 0-16 - 2-23 | Carnew Emmets | Echelon Park |

| 23 August 2025 Round 3 | Éire Óg Greystones | 1-11 - 3-16 | Kiltegan | Echelon Park |

| 23 August 2025 Round 3 | Carnew Emmets | 4-20 - 0-12 | Glenealy | Echelon Park |

== Group 2 ==
=== Group 2 table ===
Semi-finalist Quarter-finalist

| Team | Matches | | | | Score | | | Pts |
| Team | Pld | W | D | L | For | Against | Diff | Pts |
|---|---|---|---|---|---|---|---|---|
| Bray Emmets | 2 | 2 | 0 | 0 | 59 | 28 | 31 | 4 |
| Avondale | 2 | 1 | 0 | 1 | 42 | 44 | -2 | 2 |
| St Patrick's | 2 | 1 | 0 | 1 | 42 | 44 | -2 | 2 |

=== Group 2 results ===
| 19 July 2025 Round 1 | Avondale | 2-19 - 2-11 | St Patrick's | Echelon Park |

| 16 August 2025 Round 2 | St Patrick's | 0-11 - 2-26 | Bray Emmets | Echelon Park |

| 24 August 2025 Round 3 | Bray Emmets | 3-18 - 1-14 | Avondale | Echelon Park |

== Knockout stage ==
=== Quarter-finals ===
| 6 September 2025 Quarter-final | Avondale | 0-22 - 0-21 | Glenealy | Echelon Park |

| 7 September 2025 Quarter-final | Kiltegan | 0-23 - 0-14 | St Patrick's | Echelon Park |

=== Semi-finals ===
| 20 September 2025 Semi-final | Carnew Emmets | 4-10 - 0-11 | Kiltegan | Echelon Park |

| 21 September 2025 Semi-final | Bray Emmets | 0-23 - 0-09 | Avondale | Echelon Park |

=== Final ===
| 12 October 2025 Final | Carnew Emmets | 0-16 - 2-08 | Bray Emmets | Echelon Park |
| | E Kavanagh (0-5, 4f), K Cullen (0-2), O Young (0-2, 2f), J Doyle (0-2), P Doran (0-2, 2f), R Stokes (0-1); F Darcy (0-1), D Redmond (0-1). | Report | C Moorehouse (0-6, 5f 1 65), P Doyle (1-0), A Conway (1-0), M Lennon (0-1), M Lee (0-1). |
