= 2023 Wicklow Senior Hurling Championship =

Annual hurling competition season

- Dates: 14 July - 15 October 2023
- Teams: 6
- Sponsor: Lightning Protection Ireland
- Champions: Bray Emmets (9th title); Marc Lennon (captain); Paul Carley (manager)
- Runners-up: Carnew Emmets; Justin House (captain)
- Relegated: Avondale/Barndarrig

Tournament statistics
- Matches played: 17
- Goals scored: 49 (2.88 per match)
- Points scored: 464 (27.29 per match)
- Top scorer(s): Christy Moorehouse (2-57)

The 2023 Wicklow Senior Hurling Championship was the 111th staging of the Wicklow Senior Hurling Championship since its establishment by the Wicklow County Board in 1903. The championship ran from 14 July to 15 October 2023.

Bray Emmets entered the championship as the defending champions.

The final was played on 15 October 2023 at Echelon Park in Aughrim, between Bray Emmets and Carnew Emmets in what was their fourth meeting in the final overall and a first meeting in three years. Bray Emmets won the match by 2-16 to 2-08 to claim their ninth championship title overall and a record-breaking fifth successive title.

Christy Moorehouse was the championship's top scorer with 2-57.

== Group stage ==
=== Group table ===
Knockout stage Relegated

| Team | Matches | | | | Score | | | Pts |
| Team | Pld | W | D | L | For | Against | Diff | Pts |
|---|---|---|---|---|---|---|---|---|
| Bray Emmets | 5 | 5 | 0 | 0 | 117 | 54 | 63 | 10 |
| Carnew Emmets | 5 | 4 | 0 | 1 | 105 | 82 | 23 | 8 |
| Kiltegan | 5 | 3 | 0 | 2 | 107 | 87 | 20 | 6 |
| Glenealy | 5 | 2 | 0 | 3 | 87 | 89 | -2 | 4 |
| Éire Óg Greystones | 5 | 1 | 0 | 4 | 51 | 114 | -63 | 2 |
| Avondale/Barndarrig | 5 | 0 | 0 | 5 | 51 | 92 | -41 | 0 |

== Knockout stage ==
=== Semi-finals ===
| 23 September 2023 Semi-final | Bray Emmets | 2-17 - 0-08 | Glenealy | Echelon Park |
| | | Report |

| 24 September 2023 Semi-final | Carnew Emmets | 0-14 - 1-11; Penalties: 3-1 | Kiltegan | Echelon Park |
| | | Report |

=== Final ===
| 15 October 2023 Final | Bray Emmets | 2-16 - 2-08 | Carnew Emmets | Echelon Park |
| | C Moorehouse 0-8 (7f), E McCormack (1-2), B Nesbitt (0-2), D Maloney, D Masterson and D Maloney (0-1 each). | Report | P Doran (0-5, 4 frees), A Kinsella (1-0), A Myers (1-0), R, Fitzgerald (0- 2), J McGing, Jack Doyle, D Redmond (0-1 each) | Referee: L Keenan Jnr (Aughtim) |

== Championship statistics ==
=== Top scorers ===
Overall

| Rank | Player | Club | Tally | Total | Matches | Average |
|---|---|---|---|---|---|---|
| 1 | Christy Moorehouse | Bray Emmets | 2-57 | 63 | 7 | 9.00 |
| 2 | Seánie Germaine | Kiltegan | 4-35 | 47 | 6 | 7.83 |
| 3 | Gavin Weir | Glenealy | 2-37 | 43 | 6 | 7.16 |
| 3 | Pádraig Doran | Carnew Emmets | 1-40 | 43 | 7 | 6.14 |
| 5 | Mark Murphy | Kiltegan | 3-13 | 22 | 6 | 3.66 |
