= Wicklow Intermediate Hurling Championship =

Annual hurling competition in Ireland

- Irish: Craobh Iomána Idirmheánach Chill Mhantáin
- Code: Hurling
- Region: Wicklow (GAA)
- Trophy: O'Farrell Cup
- No. of teams: 7
- Title holders: Western Gaels (1st title)
- Sponsors: Lightning Protection Ireland
- Official website: Wicklow GAA

The Wicklow Intermediate Hurling Championship (known for sponsorship reasons as the Lightning Protection Ireland Intermediate Hurling Championship and abbreviated to the Wicklow IHC) is an annual club hurling competition organised by the Wicklow County Board of the Gaelic Athletic Association and contested by intermediate-ranked clubs in the county of Wicklow in Ireland, deciding the competition winners through a group and knockout format. It is the second tier overall in the entire Wicklow hurling championship system.

In its current format, the Wicklow Intermediate Hurling Championship begins with a group stage. The nine participating teams are divided into two groups and play each other in a round-robin system. The top two teams in each group proceed to the knockout phase that culminates with the final match at Echelon Park. The winner of the Wicklow Intermediate Championship, as well as gaining promotion to the Wicklow SHC, qualifies for the subsequent Leinster Junior Club Championship.

Western Gaels are the reigning champions, having beaten Arklow Rock Parnells by 4–11 to 1–09 in the 2026 final.

== Format ==
=== Group stage ===
The 7 teams in the Wicklow Intermediate Championship are divided into two groups. Over the course of the group stage, each team plays once against the others in the group, resulting in each team being guaranteed at least two or three games depending on the number of teams in the group. Two points are awarded for a win, one for a draw and zero for a loss. The teams are ranked in the group stage table by points gained, then scoring difference and then their head-to-head record. The top three teams in each group qualify for the knockout stage.

=== Knockout stage ===
Quarter-finals: The second placed team faces the third placed team from the other group. The two winners advance to the semi-final.

Semi-finals: The first placed team from each group faces one of the quarter-final winner. The two winners from these two games advance to the final.

Final: The two semi-final winners contest the final. The winning team are declared champions.

== Teams ==
=== 2026 teams ===
| Club | Location | Colours | Position in 2026 | In championship since | Championship titles | Last championship title |
|---|---|---|---|---|---|---|
| Arklow Rock Parnells | Arklow | Green and white | Runners-up | ? | 0 | — |
| Barndarrig | Barndarrig | Blue and white | Quarter-Final | 2024 | 2 | 1994 |
| Bray Emmets | Bray | Navy and green | Semi-final | ? | 3 | 2022 |
| Carnew Emmets | Carnew | Blue and yellow | Quarter-Final | ? | 2 | 2021 |
| Glenealy | Glenealy | Red and white | Group stage | ? | 4 | 2017 |
| Kilcoole | Kilcoole | Green and yellow | Semi-final | ? | 3 | 2020 |
| Western Gaels | Blessington, Lacken, Manor Kilbride, Valleymount, Hollywood, Dunlavin, and Donard/Glen | Navy and blue | Champion | ? | 1 | 2026 |

== Qualification for subsequent competitions ==
At the end of the championship, the winning team qualify to the subsequent Leinster Junior Club Hurling Championship.

== List of finals ==
| Year | Winners | | Runners-up | | Venue | # |
| Year | Club | Score | Club | Score | Venue | # |
|---|---|---|---|---|---|---|
| 2026 | Western Gaels | 4-11 | Arklow Rock Parnells | 1-09 | Echelon Park | |
| 2025 | Aughrim | 2-16 | Carnew Emmets | 1-12 | Echelon Park | |
| 2024 | Avondale | 2-16 | Aughrim | 2-03 | Echelon Park | |
| 2023 | St Patrick's | 3-13 | Bray Emmets | 1-09 | Echelon Park | |
| 2022 | Bray Emmets | 3-15 | Kilcoole | 0-10 | Echelon Park | |
| 2021 | Carnew Emmets | 2-09 | Bray Emmets | 1-10 | Aughrim County Ground | |
| 2020 | Kilcoole | 2-22 | Glenealy | 1-07 | Aughrim County Ground | |
| 2019 | Carnew Emmets | 0-10 | Barndarrig | 0-03 | Aughrim County Ground | |
| 2018 | Avondale | 5-18 | Arklow Rock Parnells | 1-06 | Aughrim County Ground | |
| 2017 | Glenealy | 2-10 | Carnew Emmets | 1-11 | Pearse Park | |
| 2016 | Kiltegan | 0-12 | Bray Emmets | 1-07 | Aughrim County Ground | |
| 2015 | Bray Emmets | 3-14 | Arklow Rock Parnells | 3-07 | Aughrim County Ground | |
| 2014 | Glenealy | 2-11 | Carnew Emmets | 1-07 | Pearse Park | |
| 2013 | Éire Óg Greystones | 0-13 | Carnew Emmets | 0-12 | Aughrim County Ground | |
| 2012 | Glenealy | 1-13 | Éire Óg Greystones | 1-08 | Aughrim County Ground | |
| 2011 | St Patrick's | 1-13 | Glenealy | 2-05 | Aughrim County Ground | |
| 2010 | Newcastle | 1-12 | Glenealy | 2-08 | Pearse Park | |

== Roll of honour ==
=== By club ===
| # | Team | Titles | Runners-up | Championships won | Championships runner-up |
|---|---|---|---|---|---|
| 1 | Bray Emmets | 2 | 3 | 2015, 2022 | 2016, 2021, 2023 |
| 1 | Carnew Emmets | 2 | 2 | 2019, 2021 | 2017, 2025 |
| 1 | Avondale | 2 | 0 | 2018, 2024 | — |
| 4 | Glenealy | 1 | 1 | 2017 | 2020 |
| 4 | Kilcoole | 1 | 1 | 2020 | 2022 |
| 4 | Aughrim | 1 | 1 | 2025 | 2024 |
| 4 | Kiltegan | 1 | 0 | 2016 | — |
| 4 | St Patrick's | 1 | 0 | 2023 | — |
| 4 | Western Gaels | 1 | 0 | 2026 | — |
| 10 | Arklow Rock Parnells | 0 | 3 | — | 2015, 2018, 2026 |
| 10 | Barndarrig | 0 | 1 | — | 2019 |

== See also ==
- Wicklow Senior Hurling Championship
- Wicklow Junior Hurling Championship
