= John Henderson (hurler) =

Irish hurler

Personal information
- Native name: Seán Mac Éinrí (Irish)
- Born: 14 October 1957 (age 69) Johnstown, County Kilkenny, Ireland
- Occupation: Financial adviser/insurance broker
- Height: 5 ft 11 in (180 cm)

Sport
- Sport: Hurling
- Position: Corner-back
Clubs
- Years: Club
- Fenians; Glenealy
Club titles
- Kilkenny titles: 1
Inter-county*
Years	County	Apps (scores)
1978-1991	Kilkenny	34 (0-00)
Inter-county titles
- Leinster titles: 6
- All-Irelands: 3
- NHL: 4
- All Stars: 1
- *Inter County team apps and scores correct as of 20:24, 16 June 2015.

John Henderson (born 14 October 1957) is an Irish retired hurler who played as a corner-back and as a full-back for the Kilkenny and Wicklow senior teams.

Born in Johnstown, County Kilkenny, Henderson first played competitive hurling during his schooling at Coláiste Mhuire. He arrived on the inter-county scene at the age of sixteen when he first linked up with the Kilkenny minor team before later joining the under-21 side. He made his senior debut during the 1979 championship. Henderson immediately became a regular member of the team and won three All-Ireland medals, six Leinster medals and four National Hurling League medals. He was an All-Ireland runner-up on two occasions.

As a member of the Leinster inter-provincial team on a number of occasions Henderson won one Railway Cup medal. At club level he is a one-time championship medallist with Fenians while he also won a championship medal with Glenealy.

His brothers, Pat and Ger, won a combined total of eight All-Ireland medals with Kilkenny.

Throughout his career Henderson made 34 championship appearances. His retirement came following the conclusion of the 1991 championship.

In retirement from playing Henderson became involved in team management and coaching. At inter-county level he managed the Wicklow senior team and the Dublin under-21 team while at club level he took charge of Cuala, Bray Emmets and Glenealy. Henderson also served as an analyst on the Sunday Game.

== Early life ==
Henderson was born in Johnstown, County Kilkenny in 1957, where he was educated locally at Johnstown's National School, where his interest in hurling reportedly first began. Later, Henderson and his two brothers, Pat and Ger, would form the backbone of the great Kilkenny team of the 1970s and early 1980s. He went to college in Carlow RTC where he won an All Ireland college's football medal.

== Playing career ==
=== Club ===
Henderson was a key member of the Feniains senior team that reached the 1977 championship decider. An Eddie Keher-inspired Rower-Inistioge provided the opposition, however, Henderson won a Kilkenny Senior Hurling Championship medal following a 3–11 to 1–10 victory.

Almost twenty years later and Henderson was lining out with Glenealy in County Wicklow. In 1996 was at full-forward as the club faced Carnew Emmets in the championship decider. A 3-7 to 0-9 victory secured the victory and a championship medal for Henderson.

=== Minor and under-21 ===
Henderson first played for Kilkenny as a member of the minor team in 1974. He was an unused substitute during that year's campaign and collected a Leinster medal on the bench following an 8-19 to 3-5 trouncing of Dublin.

The following year Henderson was included as a regular member of the starting fifteen. A 2-18 to 3-4 defeat of Dublin secured a fifth successive provincial title for the team and a first Leinster medal on the field of play for Henderson. On 6 September 1975 Kilkenny faced Cork in the All-Ireland decider. The Cats proved much too strong and powered to a 3-19 to 1-14 victory, giving Henderson an All-Ireland Minor Hurling Championship medal.

Two years later in 1977 Henderson was a key member of the Kilkenny under-21 team. He won a Leinster that year as Wexford were downed on a score line of 3-11 to 1-10. Cork were once again waiting for Kilkenny in the All-Ireland decider. Having been beaten the previous year, Kilkenny secured a narrow 2-9 to 1-9 victory giving Henderson an All-Ireland Under-21 Hurling Championship medal.

=== Senior ===
Henderson made his senior championship debut on 24 June 1979 in a 4-15 to 4-11 Leinster semi-final defeat of Dublin. He later won a Leinster medal as Wexford were defeated by 2-21 to 2-17. On 2 September 1979 Kilkenny faced Galway in the All-Ireland final. Bad weather and an unofficial train drivers’ strike resulted in the lowest attendance at a final in over twenty years. The bad weather also affected the hurling with Kilkenny scoring two freak goals as Galway ‘keeper Séamus Shinnors had a nightmare of a game. A Liam “Chunky” O’Brien 70-yard free went all the way to the net in the first half, while with just three minutes remaining a 45-yard shot from Mick Brennan was helped by the wind and dipped under the crossbar. Kilkenny won by 2-12 to 1-8 with Henderson winning his first All-Ireland medal.

After a fallow two-year period, Kilkenny bounced back in 1982 with Henderson winning his first National Hurling League medal following a 2-14 to 1-11 defeat of Wexford. He later added a second Leinster medal to his collection following a 1-11 to 0-12 defeat of three-in-a-row hopefuls and reigning All-Ireland champions Offaly. On 5 September 1982 Kilkenny and Cork renewed their rivalry in the All-Ireland decider. The Cats were rank outsiders on the day, however, a brilliant save by Noel Skehan was followed by two quick goals by Christy Heffernan just before the interval. Éamonn O'Donoghue pegged a goal back for Cork, however, Ger Fennelly added a third for Kilkenny who secured a 3-18 to 1-13 victory. It was a second All-Ireland medal for Henderson.

Henderson won a second consecutive league medal in 1983 following a narrow 2-14 to 2-12 defeat of Limerick before later collecting a third Leinster medal as Offaly were accounted for by 1-17 to 0-13. The All-Ireland final on 4 September 1983 was a replay of the previous year with Cork hoping to avenge that defeat. Billy Fitzpatrick was the star with ten points, giving Kilkenny a 2-14 to 1-9 lead with seventeen minutes left, however, they failed to score for the remainder of the game. A stunning comeback by Cork just fell short and Henderson collected a third All-Ireland medal following a 2-14 to 2-12 victory. He later won an All-Star.

In 1986 Kilkenny bounced back with Henderson collecting a third league medal following a 2-10 to 2-6 defeat of Galway. He later collected a fourth Leinster medal following a 4-10 to 1-11 defeat of reigning champions Offaly.

Henderson won a fifth Leinster medal in 1987 as Offaly were downed once again by 2-14 to 0-17. On 6 September 1987 Galway, a team who were hoping to avoid becoming the first team to lose three finals in-a-row, faced a Kilkenny team who for many of its players knew it would be their last chance to claim an All-Ireland medal. Galway ‘keeper John Commins saved two goal chances from Ger Fennelly, while at the other end substitute Noel Lane bagged a decisive goal as Galway claimed a 1-12 to 0-9 victory.

Offaly dominated the provincial series over the next three years, however, Kilkenny emerged once again in 1990. An 0-18 to 0-9 defeat of New York gave Henderson a fourth league medal.

Henderson won a sixth Leinster medal in 1991 but not without difficulty. With seconds left in the game the Dubs were winning by a single point, however, a last-gasp goal sealed a 1-11 to 0-13 victory. On 1 September 1991 Kilkenny faced old rivals Tipperary in the All-Ireland decider. The opening thirty-five minutes saw both sides trade score-for-score, however, a controversial 20-metre free, miss-hit by Michael Cleary, landed in the net and gave Tipperary a lead which they never surrendered. The final score of 1–16 to 0–15 resulted in defeat for Henderson.

After retiring from Kilkenny, Henderson joined the Wicklow senior team.

== Managerial career ==
In retirement from playing, Henderson turned his hand to inter-county management. He spent a short period in charge of the Wicklow senior hurling team, however, he had little success. He has managed several Bray Emmets juvenile teams to success. He managed the Cuala senior hurling team in Dublin prior to his management role with Dublins under 21 team. He managed the Bray Emmets Senior team to their first Wicklow Senior Hurling Championship in 61 years in 2014, along with a Division 2 Leinster League. He backed that up by managing Bray Emmets to another County Hurling title in 2015.

Sporting positions
Preceded by John McEvoy	Dublin Under-21 Hurling Manager; 2012	Succeeded by Shay Boland
