= 2022 Wicklow Senior Hurling Championship =

Annual hurling competition season

- Teams: 6
- Sponsor: Lightning Protection Ireland
- Champions: Bray Emmets (8th title); Marc Lennon (captain); Paul Carley (manager)
- Runners-up: Glenealy; Warren Kavanagh (captain); Michael Anthony O'Neill (manager)

The 2022 Wicklow Senior Hurling Championship was the 110th staging of the Wicklow Senior Hurling Championship since its establishment by the Wicklow County Board in 1903.

Bray Emmets entered the championship as the defending champions.

The final, a replay, was played on 1 October 2022 at the Aughrim County Ground, between Bray Emmets and Glenealy in what was their sixth meeting in the final overall and a second successive meeting in the final. Bray Emmets won the match by 2–16 to 2–08 to claim their eighth championship title overall and a fourth successive title.

== Knockout stage ==
=== Final ===
25 September 2022 Final	Bray Emmets	0-16 - 0-16	Glenealy	Aughrim County Ground
	C Moorehouse 0-10 (frees), M Lennon 0-4, D Maloney and M Boland 0-1 each.	Report	G Weir 0-8 (7 frees), D Dtaunton 0-5 (1f), M Traynor 0-1 (free), J O’Neill and J Kavanagh 0-1 each.

=== Final replay ===
1 October 2022 Final replay	Bray Emmets	2-16 - 2-08	Glenealy	Aughrim County Ground
	C Moorehouse 1-10 (4fs), E McCormack 1-1, M Boland 0-2, P Doyle, J Henderson, and D Masterson 0-1 each.	Report	G Weir 1-5 (1-4fs), J O'Neill 1-0, D Staunton 0-3.
