= Donal Roche =

Irish Roman Catholic priest (born 1958)

The Most Reverend Donal Roche BA BTh
- Auxiliary Bishop of Dublin; Titular bishop of Cell Ausaille
- Church: Roman Catholic
- Diocese: Dublin
- See: Cell Ausaille
- Appointed: 5 March 2024
- Predecessor: David G. O'Connell (Cell Ausaille); Raymond Field and Éamonn Walsh (Dublin)
- Previous posts: Vicar general, Episcopal vicar, Secretary to the council of priests and Assistant vocations director of the Archdiocese of Dublin; Parish priest of Wicklow, Kilbride and Barndarrig; Chaplain at St Mark's Community School; Teacher at Coláiste Dhúlaigh

Orders
- Ordination: 22 June 1986
- Consecration: 26 May 2024 by Dermot Farrell

Personal details
- Born: 16 April 1958 (age 68) Drimnagh, Dublin, Ireland
- Parents: Joe and Sheila Roche
- Education: St Patrick's College, Maynooth; Holy Cross College, Clonliffe
- Coat of arms

Donal Roche (born 16 April 1958) is an Irish prelate of the Catholic Church who has been the auxiliary bishop of Dublin and the titular bishop of Cell Ausaille since 26 May 2024.

== Early life and education ==
Roche was born in Drimnagh, Dublin on 16 April 1958, one of seven children to Joe Roche and his wife Sheila. He attended both primary and secondary school at Drimnagh Castle CBS.

Roche worked for four years as a clerical officer in Dublin County Council, before entering Holy Cross College in 1980 to study for the priesthood. He subsequently completed a Bachelor of Theology in St Patrick's College, Maynooth.

Roche was ordained a priest for the Archdiocese of Dublin on 22 June 1986.

== Presbyteral ministry ==
Following ordination, Roche's first diocesan assignment was as a priest-teacher in Coláiste Dhúlaigh, Coolock. He was appointed diocesan advisor for religious education in primary schools in 1992, before his appointment five years later as chaplain to St Mark's Community School, Tallaght. During this period, Roche also spent six years as assistant diocesan vocations director.

His first pastoral assignment was as curate in Lucan South parish, Lucan in 2005, before being appointed co-parish priest in Lucan South the following year.

Roche was appointed administrator in Wicklow and Rathnew in 2012, during which time he was also appointed administrator in Kilbride, Barndarrig and Brittas Bay for a four-year period. In an interview with The Irish Catholic in 2022, he stated that while the local community had been "very welcoming" to newcomers, there was concern and anxiety over the recent influx of asylum seekers into Wicklow.

Roche was subsequently appointed parish priest of Wicklow, Kilbride and Barndarrig in 2022. In another interview with The Irish Catholic in 2023 following the arrival of a large number of asylum seekers in Wicklow, he insisted that in spite of "understandable" concerns about housing and homelessness, Irish people were still welcoming towards asylum seekers, particularly when meeting them face-to-face.

Roche was appointed moderator in Cabinteely and Johnstown-Killiney in 2023, with additional responsibility for the developing suburb of Cherrywood.

In addition to his pastoral assignments, Roche has served as secretary to the diocesan council of priests since 2011. He was appointed episcopal vicar in 2019, with responsibility for the deaneries of Donnybrook, Dún Laoghaire, Bray and Wicklow, before being subsequently appointed diocesan vicar general in 2021. Roche is also a fluent Irish speaker, who has celebrated Mass and administered the sacraments in Irish throughout the Archdiocese of Dublin.

== Episcopal ministry ==
Roche was appointed auxiliary bishop-elect of Dublin and titular bishop of Cell Ausaille by Pope Francis on 5 March 2024. His appointment will involve supporting the Archbishop of Dublin, Dermot Farrell, in his role of leading the archdiocese through the synod on synodality. Following his appointment, Roche commended the commitment and faith of both priests and laity in the archdiocese in "challenging times".

In an interview with The Irish Catholic in March 2024, he opined that the Catholic Church must do more to reach out to young people suffering from anxiety, adding that the Easter message of Christ's victory over death is an opportunity to bring them a message of hope in a "much more secular culture" that was being greatly influenced by social media.

Roche was scheduled to be consecrated on 26 May 2024 in St Andrew's Church, Westland Row, Dublin.
