= Jimmy Hatton =

Irish Gaelic football referee (1934–2023)

Personal information
- Native name: Séamus Mac Giolla Chatáin (Irish)
- Born: 14 August 1934 Kilcoole, County Wicklow, Ireland
- Died: 28 February 2023 (aged 88) Delgany, County Wicklow, Ireland
- Occupation: Sales rep

Sport
- Football Position: Left corner-forward
- Hurling Position: Left corner-forward
Club
- Years: Club
- Kilcoole
Club titles
	Football	Hurling
Wicklow titles	1	0
Inter-county
- Years: County
- 1955–1965: Wicklow
Inter-county titles
	Football	Hurling
Leinster Titles	0	0
All-Ireland Titles	0	0
League titles	0	0

James Hatton (14 August 1934 – 28 February 2023) was an Irish Gaelic footballer, hurler and referee. He played at club level with Kilcoole and was a dual player with the Wicklow senior teams. Hatton also served as a referee at club and inter-county levels.

== Playing career ==
Hatton first played Gaelic football and hurling as a schoolboy with Kilcoole NS and Greystones CBS, winning a North Wicklow Juvenile League title in 1948. He later played at underage levels with Newtownmountkennedy and won a Wicklow U16FC title in 1950.

Hatton later had a lengthy career at senior levels with the Kilcoole club. He won a Wicklow SFC title in 1954, while he also lined out in several Wicklow SHC finals. Hatton also spent a decade as a dual player with Wicklow. He won an O'Byrne Cup title in 1957 and a Leinster JHC medal in 1964.

== Post-playing career ==
Hatton began refereeing at club level in 1957. He had the distinction of refereeing 11 All-Ireland finals at club and inter-county levels in both hurling and Gaelic football. These include eight All-Ireland finals at senior level, including both senior finals in 1966. Hatton also refereed the inaugural All-Ireland Club SFC final in 1971.

Hatton also served in various administrative roles with the Kilcoole club. He was a team selector when Wicklow won the Leinster JFC title in 1969 and when the Wicklow senior hurlers won Division 2 of the National Hurling League in 1976.

== Personal life and death ==
Hatton worked as a company rep for a clothing company. He married Rose Reilly in 1965 and the couple had four children; two boys and two girls. She predeceased Hatton in 2017.

Hatton died on 28 February 2023, at the age of 88.

== Honours ==
Newtownmountkennedy

- Wicklow Under-16 Football Championship: 1950

Kilcoole

- Wicklow Senior Football Championship: 1954
- West Wicklow Senior Football Championship: 1954

Wicklow

- O'Byrne Cup: 1957
- Leinster Junior Hurling Championship: 1964
