= Kilcoole GAA =

Gaelic games club in County Wicklow, Ireland

Kilcoole
- Cill Cúil
- Founded: 1885
- County: Wicklow
- Colours: Green and yellow
- Grounds: Kilcoole

Playing kits
Standard colours

Senior Club Championships
	All Ireland	Leinster champions	Wicklow champions
Football:	0	0	3
Hurling:	0	0	0

Kilcoole GAA is a Gaelic Athletic Association club located in Kilcoole, County Wicklow, Ireland. The club fields teams in both hurling and Gaelic football.

== History ==
Located in the town of Kilcoole, County Wicklow, Kilcoole GAA Club was founded in 1885. The club's first major success came in 1929 when Kilcoole defeated Carnew Emmets to win the Wicklow SFC title. The club claimed further honours in this grade in 1939 and 1954. Kilcoole have also appeared in eight Wicklow SHC deciders without success, however, the club has claimed a range of other honours at all levels in both codes.

== Honours ==
=== Football ===
- Wicklow Senior Football Championship (3): 1929, 1939, 1954
- Wicklow Intermediate Football Championship (2): 1950, 1992
- Wicklow Junior A Football Championship (3): 1925, 1937, 2018
- Wicklow Junior B Football Championship (1): 1980

=== Hurling ===
- Wicklow Senior B Hurling Championship (2): 1992
- Wicklow Intermediate Hurling Championship (3): 1982, 2004, 2020
- Wicklow Junior A Hurling Championship (4): 1953, 1957, 1972, 2002
- Wicklow Minor Hurling Championship (2): 1956, 1972

== Notable players ==
- Jimmy Hatton
