= Bishop O'Connell =

Bishop O'Connell may refer to:

== Catholic bishops in the United States ==
- Anthony O'Connell (1938–2012), a confessed child molester who served as a cleric, and the first Bishop of Knoxville, Tennessee
- Bishop Denis J. O'Connell (1849–1927), bishop of the diocese of Richmond, Virginia
- David M. O'Connell (born 1955), bishop of the Diocese of Trenton
- David G. O'Connell (1953–2023), auxiliary bishop of the Archdiocese of Los Angeles

== Other meanings ==
- Bishop O'Connell High School, parochial secondary school in Arlington, Virginia
