= Peter Keogh =

Journalist and sports administrator (1929–2016)

- Born: 1929
- Died: 2016 (aged 86–87)

Peter Keogh (1929–2016) was a journalist and Gaelic sports administrator.

Keogh was a member of Kiltegan GAA club and held the positions of chairman and president of Wicklow GAA during a career as an administrator that spanned from 1949 to 2016. He was best known as a sports journalist, writing for the Wicklow People newspaper from 1972 until his death in 2016. In 1996 he wrote a history of his native Kiltegan GAA club, Gateway to Glory: A GAA Story Kiltegan/Rathdangan 1886-1996.
