= Andy O'Brien (hurler) =

Wicklow hurler

Personal information
- Native name: Aindriú Ó Briain (Irish)
- Born: 1988 (age 37–38) Wicklow, Ireland

Sport
- Sport: Hurling
- Position: Full-forward
Club
- Years: Club
- St Patrick's
Club titles
- Wicklow titles: 0
Inter-county*
| Years | County | Apps (scores) |
| 2006– | Wicklow | 0 (0–0) |
Inter-county titles
- Leinster titles: 0
- All-Irelands: 0
- NHL: 0
- All Stars: 0
- *Inter County team apps and scores correct as of 17:37, 7 March 2018.

Andy O'Brien (born 1988) is an Irish hurler who plays as a full-forward for the Wicklow senior team.

== Honours ==
Wicklow

- National Hurling League Division 2B (1): 2014
- National Hurling League Division 3A (1): 2011
- National Hurling League Division 3B (1): 2010
- Christy Ring Cup Runners-up (2): 2011, 2012

Individual

- Christy Ring Cup Champion 15 (2): 2010, 2011
