= Arklow Rock Parnells GAA =

Gaelic games club in County Wicklow, Ireland

Arklow Rock Parnells
- Carraig Pharnell Inbhear Mór
- Founded: 1953
- County: Wicklow
- Colours: Green and white
- Grounds: Parnell Park

Playing kits
Standard colours

Senior Club Championships
	All Ireland	Leinster champions	Wicklow champions
Hurling:	0	0	6

Arklow Rock Parnells GAA is a Gaelic Athletic Association club located in Arklow, County Wicklow, Ireland. The club is solely concerned with the game of hurling.

== Honours ==
- Wicklow Senior Hurling Championship (6): 1970, 1971, 1972, 1977, 1982, 1985
