= Gaelcholáiste na Mara =

Location
- Pearse Park, Vale Road, Arklow, County Wicklow; Ireland

Information
- School type: High school
- Founded: 2007
- Principal: Tony Ó Murchú
- Years: First through sixth
- Gender: Mixed
- Age range: 12-18
- Enrollment: 350
- Language: Irish

Gaelcholáiste na Mara is a secondary school located in Arklow, County Wicklow, Ireland, which was founded in 2007.

It is run by the Kildare/Wicklow Education and Training Board (KWETB). At a Gaelcholáiste the pupils are taught through the medium of the Irish language. The school offers a range of subjects at both junior cycle and senior cycle.
