= Drimnagh Castle Secondary School =

School in Dublin, Ireland

Drimnagh Castle
- Caisleán Druimnigh

Location
- Drimnagh, Dublin 12; Ireland
- Coordinates: 53.3243°N 6.3337°W

Information
- Motto: Malo Mori Quam Foedari (Latin for 'Death rather than dishonour')
- Established: 1954
- Principal: Mr Conor Bradley (2024-)
- Enrollment: 550
- Website: drimnaghcastleonline.ie

Drimnagh Castle Secondary School (Irish: Meánscoil Iognáid Rís) is a Christian Brothers secondary school located on the Long Mile Road in the suburb of Drimnagh, Dublin, Ireland. The school buildings are situated directly beside the old Norman castle, Drimnagh Castle, from which the school takes its name.

== History ==
Drimnagh Castle Secondary School first opened its doors in 1954. For a short time after the school opened, classes took place in the castle itself, until the current buildings were completed at a cost of £84,000.

At the time of its opening, all students were taught by Christian Brothers. Corporal punishment, while legal, was used frequently and with some vigour. The school was not free of sexual abuse during the decades when it proliferated in Irish society. As the years passed the numbers of brothers teaching in the school gradually fell, and there are currently (As of 12/01/2026) none. The majority of students come from Drimnagh Castle Primary School, but some come from other schools in the area as well as other schools in the surrounding suburbs. From 2000 to 2013, Dr Raymond Walsh served as the first lay-Principal of the school, succeeding Br Linnane. Since 2024, that post has been held by Mr Conor Bradley.

The school celebrated its 50th anniversary in 2004. The occasion was celebrated by the addition of a new sports changing facility which was officially opened on 4 October 2004 by President Mary McAleese.

Drimnagh Castle Secondary School was identified in September 2024 in the Scoping Inquiry report into sexual abuse in schools run by religious orders. The report cited 14 allegations involving 6 alleged abusers in respect of the school.

== Notable former students ==
- Graham Barrett, Irish international footballer
- Patrick Bergin, actor and singer
- Michael Carruth, Olympic gold medalist boxer
- Frank Clarke, judge
- Eamonn Coghlan, senator and former athlete
- Cardinal Kevin Farrell, Camerlengo of the Holy Roman Church
- Roberto Lopes, Cape Verdean international footballer
- Kevin Moran, Irish international footballer and Gaelic footballer
- Charlie O'Connor, politician
- Rick O'Shea, radio personality
- Niall Quinn, Irish international footballer and businessman
- Bishop Donal Roche, Auxiliary Bishop of Dublin
- Gerry Ryan, Irish international footballer
- Tom Dunne, radio broadcaster and singer/songwriter
