= Christy Moorehouse =

Irish hurler

Personal information
- Native name: Criostóir Ó Mórdha (Irish)
- Born: 1988 (age 37–38) Bray, County Wicklow, Ireland
- Occupation: Traveller Group worker

Sport
- Sport: Hurling
- Position: Full-forward
Club
- Years: Club
- Bray Emmets
Club titles
- Wicklow titles: 7
Inter-county
- Years: County
- 2007-2021: Wicklow
Inter-county titles
- Leinster titles: 0
- All-Irelands: 0
- NHL: 0

Christy Moorehouse (born 1988) is an Irish hurler. At club level he plays with Bray Emmets and is a former member of the Wicklow senior hurling team.

== Career ==
Moorehouse first played hurling at juvenile and underage levels with the Bray Emmets club. He progressed to the club's senior team and has since won seven Wicklow SHC titles. Moorehouse was also captain of the team that won the Leinster ICHC title in 2022.

Moorehouse made his first appearance for the Wicklow senior hurling team in 2007. He was a regular member of the team for much of the following 15 seasons, during which time he won a National League Division 2B title in 2014.

== Honours ==
Bray Emmets

- Wicklow Senior Hurling Championship: 2014, 2015, 2016, 2019, 2020, 2021, 2022
- Leinster Intermediate Club Hurling Championship: 2022

Wicklow

- National League Division 2B: 2014
- Nicky Rackard Cup: 2023
