= Tom Howard (hurler) =

Irish hurler

Personal information
- Native name: Tomás Ó hÍomhair (Irish)
- Born: 1962 (age 63–64) Clarecastle, County Clare, Ireland

Sport
- Sport: Hurling
- Position: Right wing-back
Club
- Years: Club
- Clarecastle
Club titles
- Clare titles: 5
- Munster titles: 1
- All-Ireland Titles: 0
Inter-county*
Years	County	Apps (scores)
1983-1987	Clare	2 (0-00)
Inter-county titles
- Munster titles: 0
- All-Irelands: 0
- NHL: 0
- All Stars: 0
- *Inter County team apps and scores correct as of 22:37, 16 October 2012.

Tom Howard (born 1962) is an Irish former hurler who played as a right wing-back for the Clare senior team.

Howard began his inter-county career as a member of the Clare minor and under-21 teams. He made his debut with the senior team in the Oireachtas Tournament in 1983 and was a regular player on the inter-county scene for a number of seasons. During that time he enjoyed little success.

At club level Howard is a Munster medalist with Clarecastle. In addition to this he has also won five county club championship winners' medals.

In retirement from playing Howard became involved in team management, initially working as a selector and manager with the Clarecastle and Kilmoyley club teams.

On 15 October 2012, Howard was appointed manager of the Kerry senior hurling team.

Sporting positions
Preceded by John Meyler	Kerry Senior Hurling Manager; 2012-2013	Succeeded by Vacant
