= David G. O'Connell =

American Catholic bishop (1953–2023)

His Excellency, The Most Reverend David Gerard O'Connell KC*HS
- Auxiliary Bishop of Los Angeles
- Church: Catholic Church
- Archdiocese: Los Angeles
- Appointed: July 21, 2015
- Term ended: February 18, 2023
- Other posts: Titular Bishop of Cell Ausaille (2015–2023)

Orders
- Ordination: July 10, 1979 by John Scanlan
- Consecration: September 12, 2015 by Archbishop José Horacio Gómez, Joseph Martin Sartoris, and Blase J. Cupich

Personal details
- Born: July 16, 1953 Glanmire, County Cork, Ireland
- Died: February 18, 2023 (aged 69) Hacienda Heights, California, United States
- Education: All Hallows College; Mount St. Mary's College
- Motto: Jesus I trust in you

Styles of David Gerard O'Connell
- Reference style: His Excellency; The Most Reverend
- Spoken style: Your Excellency
- Religious style: Bishop

David Gerard O'Connell KC*HS (July 16, 1953 – February 18, 2023) was an Irish-born prelate of the Catholic Church who was an auxiliary bishop of the Archdiocese of Los Angeles in California from 2015 until his murder in 2023. He served in the Los Angeles area for the entirety of his career as a priest.

== Early life ==
David O'Connell was born in Glanmire, County Cork, Ireland, on July 16, 1953, the son of David and Joan O’Connell. He earned a bachelor's degree in philosophy and English literature at University College Dublin in 1975 and a Bachelor of Divinity degree from Maynooth College in 1977. He completed his studies for the priesthood at All Hallows College in Dublin. He was ordained a deacon by Cardinal Timothy Manning of Los Angeles.

=== Priesthood ===
O'Connell was ordained a priest for the Archdiocese of Los Angeles on July 10, 1979, at All Hallows by Bishop John Scanlan. After his ordination, O'Connell served as associate pastor at three parishes in Southern California: St. Raymond in Downey from 1979 to 1983, St. Maria Goretti in Long Beach in 1983-84, and St. Hillary in Pico Rivera from 1984 to 1988. In 1987, while serving in Los Angeles, he obtained a Master of Spirituality degree from Mount St. Mary's College.

O'Connell later served as pastor at four Los Angeles parishes: St. Frances Xavier Cabrini and Ascension Parish from 1988 to 2003, Ascension Catholic, St. Eugene from 2004 to 2006, and St. Michael from 2003 to 2015.

On the archdiocesan level, O'Connell also served for various periods as a diocesan deacon and a member of the Council of Priests. He was also a member of the Priest Pension Board, the Together in Mission Board, and the Archdiocesan Finance Council. He was a Knight of Peter Claver.

== Auxiliary Bishop of Los Angeles ==
Pope Francis appointed O'Connell titular bishop of Cell Ausaille and as an auxiliary bishop of Los Angeles on July 21, 2015. He was consecrated by Archbishop José Gómez on September 8, 2015. At that time, Gómez named O'Connell his episcopal vicar for the San Gabriel Pastoral Region of the archdiocese. He was invested as a Knight Grand Officer in the Equestrian Order of the Holy Sepulchre of Jerusalem in September 2022.

== Death and legacy ==
O'Connell died from gunshot wounds at his home in Hacienda Heights on February 18, 2023.

In March 2023, Gómez presided at the funeral mass for O’Connell at the Cathedral of Our Lady of the Angels in Los Angeles. The service drew thousands of attendees. Monsignor Jarlath Cunnane, a close friend of O'Connell, delivered the homily:

“For Dave life was, and especially in the recent years, life was prayer. Life was in the presence of Christ, and that is what he shared. Yes, he helped the poor. Yes, he fought for justice. But most of all, what he wanted to share was that encounter with Jesus Christ,”

Both Francis and US President Joe Biden sent their condolences to O'Connell's family.

=== Murder investigation ===
A deacon discovered O'Connell at the house after he failed to show up at a scheduled meeting. Police opened a homicide investigation. On February 20, police arrested Carlos Medina at his residence in Torrance, California. Carlos Medina's wife was O'Connell's housekeeper and had performed work on O'Connell's house. According to information received by police, Medina told an associate that O'Connell owed him money.

On February 22, Los Angeles District Attorney George Gascón reported that Medina had confessed to murdering O'Connell. However, Medina pleaded not guilty to murder in March 2023. In October 2024, the court began proceedings to examine Medina's mental health.

Catholic Church titles
Preceded by –	Auxiliary Bishop of Los Angeles; 2015–2023	Succeeded by –
Preceded by Donal McKeown	Titular Bishop of Cell Ausaille; 2015–2023	Succeeded by Vacant
