= Barndarrig GAA =

Barndarrig
- Bearna Dearg
- Founded: 1885
- County: Wicklow
- Colours: Blue and white
- Grounds: Barndarrig

Playing kits
Standard colours

Senior Club Championships
	All Ireland	Leinster champions	Wicklow champions
Hurling:	0	0	12

Barndarrig GAA is a Gaelic Athletic Association club located in Barndarrig, County Wicklow, Ireland. The duly code club historically was primarily concerned with the game of hurling, in recent times Gaelic Football as well as Hurling teams have progressed in the club with the accumulation of an intermediate football championship in 2023 to go with there 12 senior Hurling Championships, there is also a thriving ladies football team who are going from strength to strength.

== History ==
Located in the village of Barndarrig, County Wicklow, Barndarrig GAA Club was founded in 1885, making it one of the oldest clubs in Wicklow. The club won its first Wicklow SHC title in 1923. Barndarrig regularly appeared in county finals and have won 12 titles in all, the last of which was claimed in 1988.

== Honours ==
- Wicklow Senior Hurling Championship (12): 1923, 1924, 1926, 1943, 1944, 1945, 1948, 1951, 1954, 1955, 1956, 1988
- Wicklow Intermediate Hurling Championship (2): 1987, 1994
- Wicklow Junior A Hurling Championship (1): 1941
- wicklow intermediate football championship (1) 2023
- Wicklow Junior A Football Championship (2): 1985, 2021
- LGFA Junior B Football Championship (1): 2023
