= Avondale GAA =

Avondale
- Abhainn Dála
- Founded: 1886
- County: Wicklow
- Colours: Green and white
- Grounds: Avondale GAA Field, Rathdrum
- Coordinates: 52°55′23″N 6°14′31″W

Playing kits
Standard colours

Senior Club Championships
| | All Ireland | Leinster champions | Wicklow champions |
|---|---|---|---|
| Football: | 0 | 0 | 1 |
| Hurling: | 0 | 0 | 14 |

Avondale GAA is a Gaelic Athletic Association club in Rathdrum, County Wicklow, Ireland. The club fields teams in both hurling and Gaelic football.

== History ==
Located in the village of Rathdrum, County Wicklow, Avondale GAA Club was founded in 1886. Nationalist leader Charles Stewart Parnell made the grounds of Avondale House available to the club in the early days, while his brother, John Howard Parnell, became club president. Avondale had its first successes in 1908 when the club secured a SHC-SFC double. The club continued to win championship titles in all grades and in both codes throughout its history, including in the Wicklow SHC. In 1964, Avondale won its 12th Wicklow SHC title to lead the all-time roll of honour for the first time in their history. The club's last SHC triumph was in 1983, however, Avondale has since won several JAHC and IHC titles. Avondale amalgamated with neighbouring club Barndarrig for a brief period and contested the SHC before being relegated to the IHC as separate clubs.

== Honours ==
- Wicklow Senior Football Championship (1): 1908
- Wicklow Senior Hurling Championship (14): 1908, 1915, 1931, 1936, 1940, 1941, 1942, 1946, 1947, 1949, 1960, 1964, 1966, 1983
- Wicklow Intermediate Football Championship (3): 1977, 2004, 2012
- Wicklow Intermediate Hurling Championship (2): 2018, 2024
- Wicklow Junior Football Championship (3): 1942, 1953, 1996
- Wicklow Junior Hurling Championship (4): 1931, 1955, 1995, 1997

== Notable players ==
- Jimmy Kearns: All-Ireland JHC-winning captain (1967)
