= Wicklow Senior Hurling Championship =

Annual hurling competition in Ireland

- Current season or competition: 2026 Wicklow Senior Hurling Championship
- Irish: Craobh Iomána Sinsearach Chill Mhantáin
- Code: Hurling
- Founded: 1903; 123 years ago
- Region: Wicklow (GAA)
- Trophy: O'Donoghue Cup
- No. of teams: 6
- Title holders: Carnew Emmets (21st title)
- Most titles: Carnew Emmets (21 titles)
- Sponsors: Lightning Protection Ireland
- Official website: Wicklow GAA

The Wicklow Senior Hurling Championship (known for sponsorship reasons as the Lightning Protection Ireland Senior Hurling Championship and abbreviated to the Wicklow SHC) is an annual club hurling competition organised by the Wicklow County Board of the Gaelic Athletic Association and contested by the top-ranking senior clubs in the county of Wicklow in Ireland, deciding the competition winners through a group and knockout format. It is the most prestigious competition in Wicklow hurling.

In its current format, the Wicklow Senior Hurling Championship begins with a group stage. The six participating teams play each other in a round-robin system. The four top-ranking teams proceed to the knockout phase that culminates with the final match at Echelon Park. The winner of the Wicklow Senior Championship, as well as being presented with the O'Donoghue Cup, qualifies for the subsequent Leinster Intermediate Club Championship.

The competition has been won by 14 teams, 10 of which have won it more than once. Carnew Emmets is the most successful team in the tournament's history, having won it 21 times. Carnew Emmets are the reigning champions, having beaten Glenealy by 0–15 to 0-12 in the 2026 final.

== History ==
The first senior championship was won by Barndarrig in 1923. There was no Wicklow championship in 1938.

== Format ==
=== Group stage ===
Eight clubs start in the group stage. Over the course of the group stage, each team plays once against the others in the group, resulting in each team being guaranteed three group games. Two points are awarded for a win, one for a draw and zero for a loss. The teams are ranked in the group stage table by points gained, then scoring difference and then their head-to-head record. The top six teams qualify for the knockout stage

=== Knockout stage ===
Quarter-finals: The teams coming second in their groups compete against the teams coming third from the other group

Semi-finals: The teams coming first in the groups compete against the winners from the quarter-finals. The two winners from these games advance to the final.

Final: The two semi-final winners contest the final. The winning team are declared champions.

== Teams ==
=== 2026 Teams ===
Club	Location	Colours	Position in 2026	In championship since	Championship titles	Last championship title
Aughrim	Aughrim	White and blue	Relegation final	2026	?	?
Avondale	Rathdrum	Green and white	Relegated	2025	14	1983
Bray Emmets	Bray	Navy and green	Semi-finals	?	10	2024
Carnew Emmets	Carnew	Blue and yellow	Champions	?	21	2026
Éire Óg Greystones	Greystones	Blue and white	Quarter-finals	?	0	—
Glenealy	Glenealy	Red and white	Runners-up	?	16	2018
Kiltegan	Kiltegan	White and red	Quarter-finals	?	8	2001
St Patrick's	Wicklow	Blue and white	Semi-finals	2024	6	1992

=== 2026 grades ===
Championship	Club
Senior championships
Senior	Aughrim
Senior	Avondale
Senior	Bray Emmets
Senior	Carnew Emmets
Senior	Éire Óg Greystones
Senior	Glenealy
Senior	Kiltegan
Senior	St Patrick's
Intermediate championships
Intermediate	Arklow Rock Parnells
Intermediate	Barndarrig
Intermediate	Bray Emmets (2nd team)
Intermediate	Carnew Emmets (2nd team)
Intermediate	Glenealy (2nd team)
Intermediate	Kilcoole
Intermediate	Western Gaels
Junior championships
Junior A	Bray Emmets (3rd team)
Junior A	Carnew Emmets (3rd team)
Junior A	Éire Óg Greystones (2nd team)
Junior A	Kiltegan (2nd team)
Junior A	St Patrick's (2nd team)
Junior B	Arklow Rock Parnells (2nd team)
Junior B	Aughrim (2nd team)
Junior B	Barndarrig (2nd team)
Junior B	Éire Óg Greystones (3rd team)
Junior B	Kilcoole (2nd team)
Junior B	Knockananna

== Qualification for subsequent competitions ==
At the end of the championship, the winning team qualify to the subsequent Leinster Intermediate Club Hurling Championship, the winner of which progresses to the All-Ireland Intermediate Club Hurling Championship.

== Roll of honour ==
=== By club ===
#	Club	Titles	Championships won
1	Carnew Emmets	21	1965, 1967, 1968, 1969, 1973, 1974, 1976, 1978, 1979, 1980, 1981, 1984, 1989, 1991, 2000, 2002, 2004, 2006, 2009, 2025, 2026
2	Glenealy	16	1957, 1958, 1959, 1975, 1986, 1996, 2003, 2005, 2007, 2008, 2010, 2011, 2012, 2013, 2017, 2018
3	Avondale	14	1908, 1915, 1931, 1936, 1940, 1941, 1942, 1946, 1947, 1949, 1960, 1964, 1966, 1983
4	Barndarrig	12	1923, 1924, 1926, 1943, 1944, 1945, 1948, 1951, 1954, 1955, 1956, 1988
5	Rathnew	11	1906, 1911, 1913, 1925, 1929, 1932, 1933, 1934, 1937, 1939, 1950
6	Bray Emmets	10	1952, 2014, 2015, 2016, 2019, 2020, 2021, 2022, 2023, 2024
7	Kiltegan	8	1987, 1993, 1994, 1995, 1997, 1998, 1999, 2001
8	Arklow Rock Parnells	6	1970, 1971, 1972, 1977, 1982, 1985
8	St Patrick's	6	1903, 1916, 1928, 1930, 1990, 1992
10	Arklow	3	1917, 1918, 1919
11	St Kevin's	2	1961, 1963
11	Baltinglass	1	1927
11	Ballymoney	1	1910
11	Ballinacor	1	1935
11	Avoca	1	1953
11	Forestry College	1	1962

== List of finals ==
=== Legend ===
- Gold – Leinster intermediate club champions
- Silver – Leinster intermediate club runners-up

=== List of Wicklow SHC finals ===
Year	Winners		Runners-up		#
Year	Club	Score	Club	Score	#
2026	Carnew Emmets	0-15	Glenealy	0-12	
2025	Carnew Emmets	0–16	Bray Emmets	2-08	
2024	Bray Emmets	0-23	Carnew Emmets	4-08	
2023	Bray Emmets	1–15	Carnew Emmets	2–10	
2022	Bray Emmets	2–16	Glenealy	2-08	
2021	Bray Emmets	1–16	Glenealy	1–11	
2020	Bray Emmets	1-21	Carnew Emmets	1-04	
2019	Bray Emmets	1–19	Glenealy	1-09	
2018	Glenealy	4–10	Carnew Emmets	1–12	
2017	Glenealy	2–12	Bray Emmets	0–11	
2016	Bray Emmets	1–17	Carnew Emmets	1-06	
2015	Bray Emmets	1–18	Carnew Emmets	1-09	
2014	Bray Emmets	2-09	Glenealy	1–11	
2013	Glenealy	0–17	Bray Emmets	0–14	
2012	Glenealy	1–11	Carnew Emmets	0–10	
2011	Glenealy	3-09	Carnew Emmets	3-06	
2010	Glenealy	3–13	Carnew Emmets	0-09	
2009	Carnew Emmets	0–18	Glenealy	1–13	
2008	Glenealy	2–10	Carnew Emmets	0–10	
2007	Glenealy	4–16	Kiltegan	3–14	
2006	Carnew Emmets	2-08	Glenealy	0–11	
2005	Glenealy	1–11	Carnew Emmets	0-06	
2004	Carnew Emmets	0–16	Glenealy	1-08	
2003	Glenealy	1–10	Carnew Emmets	1-07	
2002	Carnew Emmets	2–12	St Patrick's	1-05	
2001	Kiltegan	0–16	Glenealy	0–14	
2000	Carnew Emmets	2-09	Glenealy	0-09	
1999	Kiltegan	2–17	Carnew Emmets	1-08	
1998	Kiltegan	1–10	Glenealy	0-03	
1997	Kiltegan	1–11	St Patrick's	1-06	
1996	Glenealy	3-07	Carnew Emmets	0-09	
1995	Kiltegan	1-07	Carnew Emmets	1-05	
1994	Kiltegan	2–10	St Patrick's	0–11	
1993	Kiltegan	3-07	Glenealy	1-06	
1992	St Patrick's	0–18	Carnew Emmets	2–10	
1991	Carnew Emmets	1-09	Barndarrig	2-04	
1990	St Patrick's	1-08	Barndarrig	0-08	
1989	Carnew Emmets	2-07	St Patrick's	1-06	
1988	Barndarrig	1-09	Kiltegan	1-07	
1987	Kiltegan	3-06	Arklow Rock Parnells	1-08	
1986	Glenealy	2-08	Carnew Emmets	2-06	
1985	Arklow Rock Parnells	2–10	Kilcoole	1-09	
1984	Carnew Emmets	3-09	Kiltegan	2-04	
1983	Avondale	3–11	Kilcoole	1-09	
1982	Arklow Rock Parnells	2–10	Carnew Emmets	0-06	
1981	Carnew Emmets	3-05	Arklow Rock Parnells	0-08	
1980	Carnew Emmets	1-08	Glenealy	0-09	
1979	Carnew Emmets	0–14	Arklow Rock Parnells	0-04	
1978	Carnew Emmets	3-06	Arklow Rock Parnells	2-02	
1977	Arklow Rock Parnells	2–11	Glenealy	0-05	
1976	Carnew Emmets		Avondale		
1975	Glenealy	3-02	Arklow Rock Parnells	2-03	
1974	Carnew Emmets	2-04	Glenealy	0-03	
1973	Carnew Emmets	6–11	West District	3-06	
1972	Arklow Rock Parnells		No opponents		
1971	Arklow Rock Parnells		Carnew Emmets		
1970	Arklow Rock Parnells	4-04	Avondale	1-04	
1969	Carnew Emmets	5–10	Kilcoole	2-07	
1968	Carnew Emmets	1–13	Avondale	1-03	
1967	Carnew Emmets		Avondale		
1966	Avondale	1-07	Carnew Emmets	1-06	
1965	Carnew Emmets	1-08	Arklow Geraldines	2-04	
1964	Avondale	2–10	Kilcoole	2-03	
1963	St Kevin's, Bray	4-04	Kilcoole	3-01	
1962	Forestry College	4-07	St Kevin's, Bray	3-03	
1961	St Kevin's, Bray	8-02	Forestry College	3-05	
1960	Avondale		Kilcoole		
1959	Glenealy	4-04	Barndarrig	3-03	
1958	Glenealy	4-07	Kilcoole	4-03	
1957	Glenealy	3-02	Avondale	2-02	
1956	Barndarrig	3-07	Avondale	3-04	
1955	Barndarrig	5-02	Avondale	3-02	
1954	Barndarrig	4-09	Kilcoole	4-01	
1953	Avoca	5-07	Glenealy	2-01	
1952	Bray Emmets	4-05	Avondale	2-03	
1951	Barndarrig	5-07	Avondale	2-04	
1950	Rathnew	5-06	Bray Emmets	2-01	
1949	Avondale	2-07	Barndarrig	1-01	
1948	Barndarrig	3-05	Avondale	3-03	
1947	Avondale		Barndarrig		
1946	Avondale		Wicklow		
1945	Barndarrig		Avondale		
1944	Barndarrig	5-09	Avondale	1-03	
1943	Barndarrig	5-01	St Killian's (Greystones)	2-04	
1942	Avondale		Barndarrig		
1941	Avondale		Rathnew		
1940	Avondale		Rathnew		
1939	Rathnew		Avondale		
1938	No Championship				
1937	Rathnew	5-00	Whitestown	6-03	
1936	Avondale		Ballincor (Arklow)		
1935	Ballincor (Arklow)		Avondale		
1934	Rathnew		Wicklow		
1933	Rathnew		Avondale		
1932	Rathnew	4-01	Barndarrig	2-03	
1931	Avondale		Wicklow		
1930	Rathnew		Avondale		
1929	Rathnew		Avondale		
1928	Wicklow		Baltinglass		
1927	Baltinglass		Barndarrig		
1926	Barndarrig		Avondale		
1925	Rathnew		Avondale		
1924	Barndarrig		Avondale		
1923	Barndarrig		Avondale		
1922	No Championship				
1921	No Championship				
1920	No Championship				
1919	Avondale				
1918	Avondale				
1917	Avondale				
1916	Wicklow				
1915	Avondale	2-04	Wicklow	3-00	
1914	No Championship				
1913	Rathnew		Avondale		
1912	No Championship				
1911	Rathnew		Ballymoney		
1910	Ballymoney				
1909	No Championship				
1908	Avondale				
1907	No Championship				
1906	Rathnew				
1905	No Championship				
1904	No Championship				
1903	Wicklow	1-06	Baltinglass	0-01	

=== Notes ===
- 1937- Although Whitestown (Baltinglass) won on the day they were later stripped of the title and suspended for playing illegal players.
- 2008 - The first match ended in a draw: Glenealy 1–12, Carnew Emmets 1–12.
- 2016 - The first match ended in a draw: Bray Emmets 1–10, Carnew Emmets 0–12.
- 2022- The first match ended in a draw: Bray Emmets 1–16, Glenealy 1–16.

== Records and statistics ==
=== Final ===
==== Team ====
- Most wins: 21:
  - Carnew Emmets (1965, 1967, 1968, 1969, 1973, 1974, 1976, 1978, 1979, 1980, 1981, 1984, 1989, 1991, 2000, 2002, 2004, 2006, 2009, 2025, 2026)
- Most consecutive wins: 6:
  - Bray Emmets (2019, 2020, 2021, 2022, 2023, 2024)
- Most appearances in a final: 41:
  - Carnew Emmets (1965, 1966, 1967, 1968, 1969, 1971, 1973, 1974, 1976, 1978, 1979, 1980, 1981, 1982, 1984, 1986, 1989, 1991, 1992, 1995, 1996, 1999, 2000, 2002, 2003, 2004, 2005, 2006, 2008, 2009, 2010, 2011, 2012, 2015, 2016, 2018, 2020, 2023, 2024, 2025, 2026)
- Most appearances in a final without ever winning: 8:
  - Kilcoole (1954, 1958, 1960, 1963, 1964, 1969, 1983, 1985)
- Most defeats in a final: 20:
  - Carnew Emmets (1966, 1971, 1982, 1986, 1992, 1995, 1996, 1999, 2003, 2005, 2008, 2010, 2011, 2012, 2015, 2016, 2018, 2020, 2023, 2024)

=== Teams ===
==== By decade ====
The most successful team of each decade, judged by number of Wicklow Senior Hurling Championship titles, is as follows:

- 1910s: 2 for Rathnew (1911–13)
- 1920s: 3 for Barndarrig (1923-24-26)
- 1930s: 5 for Rathnew (1932-33-34-37-39)
- 1940s: 6 for Avondale (1940-41-42-46-47-49)
- 1950s: 4 for Barndarrig (1951-54-55-56)
- 1960s: 4 for Carnew Emmets (1965-67-68,-69)
- 1970s: 5 for Carnew Emmets (1973-74-76-78-79)
- 1980s: 4 for Carnew Emmets (1980-81-84-89)
- 1990s: 6 for Kiltegan (1993-94-95-97-98-99)
- 2010s: 6 for Glenealy (2010-11-12-13-17-18)
- 2020s: 5 for Bray Emmets (2020-21-22-23-24)

==== Gaps ====
Longest gaps between successive championship titles:

- 62 years: Bray Emmets (1952–2014)
- 60 years: St Patrick's (1930–1990)
- 32 years: Barndarrig (1956–1988)

== See also ==
- Wicklow Senior Football Championship
- Wicklow Intermediate Hurling Championship
- Wicklow Junior Hurling Championship
