= Cell Ausaille =

TItular see of the Catholic Church

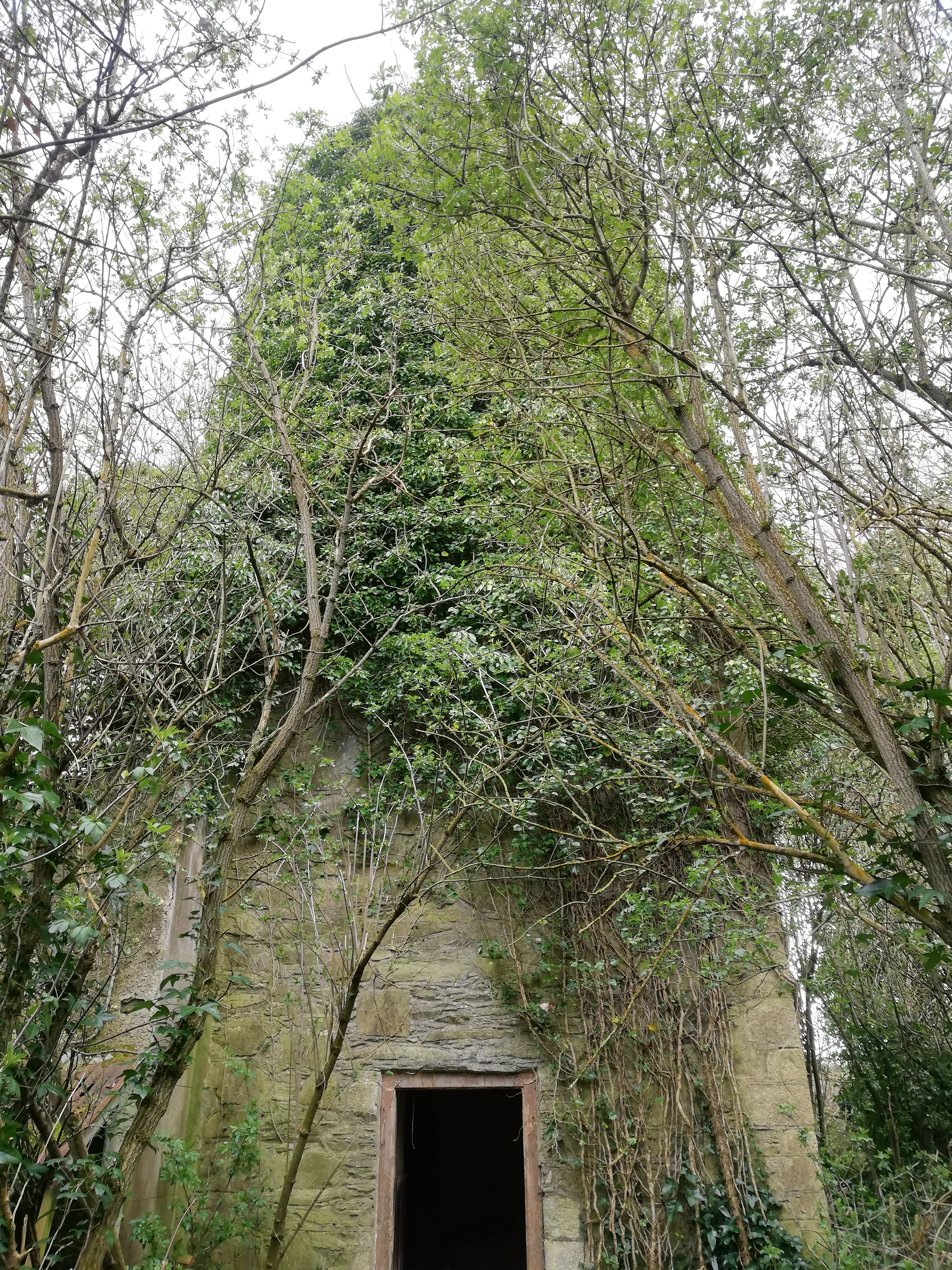
Killashee Round Tower

The Diocese of Cell Ausaille is now a titular see of the Catholic Church.

When it was a residential see, it had its centre at Killossy, near Naas, County Kildare, Ireland.

The first titular bishop of this ancient see was appointed on 24 April 1970.

For an adjectival form in Latin referring to the see, use is made of Cellae Sancti Auxilii.
