= Pearse Park (Arklow) =

Gaelic sports stadium in County Wicklow, Ireland

- Páirc na bPiarsach
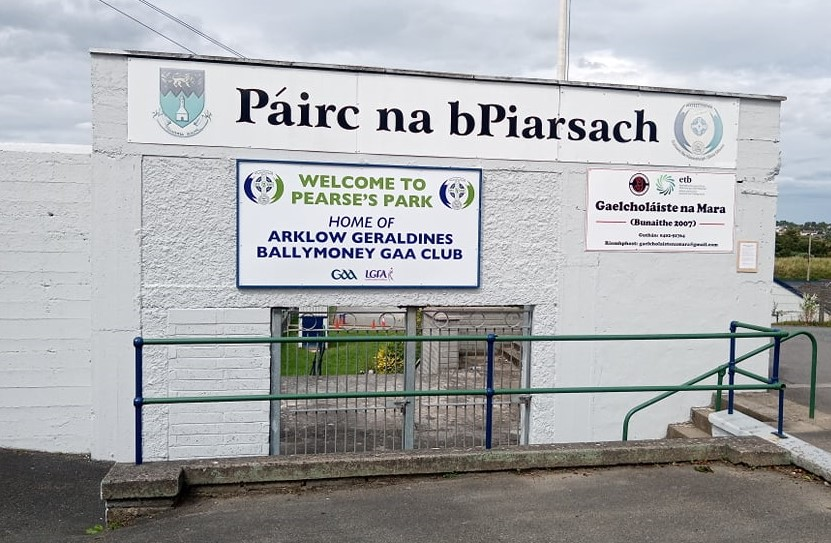

- Location within Ireland
- Location: Vale Road, Arklow, County Wicklow, Ireland
- Coordinates: 52.801246°N 6.169561°W
- Owner: Arklow Geraldines Ballymoney GAA
- Capacity: 5,000
- Surface: grass
- Public transit: Arklow railway station

Tenant
- Wicklow GAA

Pearse Park or Pearse's Park, (Irish: Páirc na bPiarsach) is an GAA stadium in Arklow, County Wicklow, Ireland. It is the home of the Wicklow hurling and camogie teams. The ground has a capacity of about 5,000.

== History ==
=== Pearse name and redevelopment ===
The ground is named after both the Pearse brothers executed in 1916; Patrick Pearse and Willie Pearse. It is believed that the ground was redeveloped around 1965.

=== Former use ===
Before the ground was redeveloped it was a greyhound racing track known as the Arklow Greyhound Track. The track raced under Irish Coursing Club rules and opened on 30 July 1949 but the Arklow Greyhound Racing Company was fined in 1949 for failing to stamp admission tickets and failure to produce a register. In 1951 landlord William Smyth sued the company for £375 unpaid rent & £1,300 under a covenant of the lease. The company counter claimed for £4,200 stating that payments had been made to Mr Smyth but they lost the case. The 13 acre, 2 rood, 16 perches site complete with grandstand was then put up for auction in 1953 and again in December 1954. With no buyer due to the government refusing licensing the site went to auction again on 31 May 1956. Another application for re-opening in 1958 was refused because the nearby Enniscorthy Greyhound Stadium track objected. The Royal Bank Ltd acquired the site and auctioned it off for a last time on 25 March 1958 as freehold land. An injunction a year later stopped Mr Smyth from removing items from the track after he had removed the mechanical hare rail, kennels and windows. Some locals still call the venue the old dog track.

== Other uses ==
There is an Irish language secondary school located on the grounds, Gaelcholáiste na Mara.

== See also ==
- List of Gaelic Athletic Association stadiums
- List of stadiums in Ireland by capacity
