= Barndarrig =

Village in County Wicklow, Ireland

Barndarrig An Bhearn Dearg
- Village
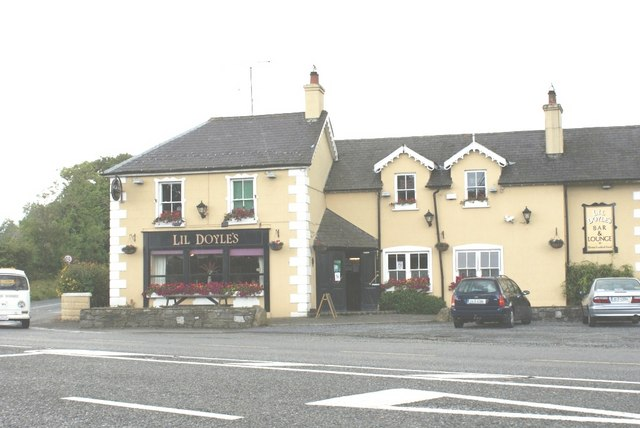
- Lil Doyle's pub, Barndarrig

- Location in Ireland
- Coordinates: 52°54′37″N 6°06′32″W
- Country: Ireland
- Province: Leinster
- County: County Wicklow

Population (2016)
  - Total: 260
- Time zone: UTC+0 (WET)
  - Summer (DST): UTC-1 (IST (WEST))

Barndarrig (Irish: An Bhearn Dearg) is a village in County Wicklow, Ireland. It is located just off the N11 road.

== Public transport ==
The village is served by a bus stop on the N11 road. It is served daily in each direction by several (but not all) coaches on Bus Éireann's Expressway route 2 (Wexford-Arklow-Dublin-Dublin Airport). It is also served albeit infrequently by Bus Éireann route 384. The nearest railway station is Wicklow railway station.

Until the end of September 2012 Bus Éireann route 2 used to stop at Ballincor numerous times each day. From then this changed, resulting in considerable public dissatisfaction with the decision – as the bus provided a useful link to hospitals as well as for commuting and other purposes. The stop was reinstated in the route 2 timetable from 25 August 2013.

== See also ==
- List of towns and villages in Ireland
