= Bray Emmets GAA =

Gaelic games club in County Wicklow, Ireland

Bray Emmets
- Emmet Bhré / Emmet Brí Chualann
- Founded: 1885
- County: Wicklow
- Colours: Navy White & Green
- Grounds: Old Connaught Avenue (Ol' Conna), Bray
- Coordinates: 53.207761°N 6.127244°W

Playing kits
Standard colours

Senior Club Championships
	All Ireland	Leinster champions	Wicklow champions
Football:	-	-	2
Hurling:	-	-	10

Bray Emmets Gaelic Athletic Association is a hurling, camogie, Gaelic football and ladies' Gaelic football club in Bray, County Wicklow, Ireland.

== History ==
The first club AGM took place on 11 December 1886. The first recorded Bray Emmets team played Dalkey in a field at the Vevay in 1885. The club took its name from Robert Emmet (1778–1803), an Irish rebel leader.

The club host the annual All-Ireland Kick Fada Championship, first held in 2000.

== Honours ==
=== Hurling ===
- Leinster Intermediate Club Hurling Championship (1) 2022
- Wicklow Senior Hurling Championship (10) 1952, 2014, 2015, 2016, 2019, 2020, 2021, 2022, 2023, 2024
- Wicklow Intermediate Hurling Championship (3) 2006, 2015, 2022
- Wicklow Junior Hurling Championship (3) 2004, 2014, 2020 (Played 11/06/2021 due to covid restrictions)

=== Football ===
- Wicklow Senior Football Championship (3) 1934, 1935
- Dublin Senior Football Championship (1) 1901
- Wicklow Intermediate Football Championship (2) 1973, 1997
- Wicklow Junior A Football Championship (1) 2005
- Wicklow Junior B Football Championship (1) 2022

=== Camogie ===
- Wicklow Intermediate Camogie Championship (2) 2017, 2019
- Wicklow Junior Camogie Championship (1) 2016

=== Ladies Football ===
- Wicklow Ladies Football Senior B Championship (1) 2017

== Notable players ==
- John Henderson
- Finn Bálor
- Dara Ó Briain
- Christy Moorehouse
- Áine O'Gorman
