= Carnew Emmets GAA =

Gaelic games club in County Wicklow, Ireland

Carnew Emmets
- Eiméid Charn an Bhua
- Founded: 1886
- County: Wicklow
- Colours
- Grounds: Carnew Emmets GAA Grounds
- Coordinates: 52°42′53″N 6°29′35″W

Playing kits
Standard colours

Senior Club Championships
| | All Ireland | Leinster champions | Wicklow champions |
|---|---|---|---|
| Football: | 0 | 0 | 4 |
| Hurling: | 0 | 0 | 21 |

Carnew Emmets GAA is a Gaelic Athletic Association club in Carnew, County Wicklow, Ireland. The club is affiliated to the Wicklow County Board and fields teams in hurling and Gaelic football.

== History ==
Located in the village of Carnew, on the Wicklow-Wexford border, Carnew GAA Club was founded in 1886. The club was known simply as Carnew until 1900, when it briefly took the name Carnew's Kruger Volunteers in honour of the Boer leader Paul Kruger. The Kruger name was subsequently dropped and the club quickly became known as Carnew Emmets, as a tribute to the United Irishman Robert Emmet.

Carnew's first major success occurred in 1916, when the club won their inaugural Wicklow SFC title. Further such titles were won in 1927, 1945 and 1973. The club has had success in every grade, including three Wicklow JFC triumphs. Carnew Emmets won their fifth Wicklow IFC title in 2024, after a 1–09 to 2–02 win over Hollywood in a final replay.

In hurling, Carnew Emmets won several Wicklow JHC titles before claiming their inaugural Wicklow SHC title in 1965. The club went on to dominate Wicklow hurling for the following 35 years and had won a record 15 Wicklow SHC titles by 2000. The dominance continued into the 21st century, with Carnew Emmets winning their 21st Wicklow SHC title after a 0–15 to 0–12 win over Glenealy in 2026.

== Honours ==
- Wicklow Senior Football Championship (4): 1916, 1927, 1945, 1973
- Wicklow Senior Hurling Championship (21): 1965, 1967, 1968, 1969, 1973, 1974, 1976, 1978, 1979, 1980, 1981, 1984, 1989, 1991, 2000, 2002, 2004, 2006, 2009, 2025, 2026
- Wicklow Intermediate Hurling Championship (2): 2019, 2021
- Wicklow Intermediate Football Championship (5): 1937, 1965, 1980, 2008, 2024
- Wicklow Junior A Football Championship (3): 1935, 1959, 1978
- Wicklow Junior A Hurling Championship (7): 1932, 1954, 1959, 1974, 1998, 2003, 2007

== Notable players ==
- Don Hyland: All-Ireland SBHC-winner (2003)
