= St Patrick's GAA (Wicklow) =

Gaelic games club in County Wicklow, Ireland

- Naomh Pádraig CLG
- Founded: 1886
- County: Wicklow
- Nickname: Pats
- Colours: Blue and White
- Grounds: Dunbur Road
- Coordinates: 52.973605°N 6.026530°W

Playing kits
Standard colours

Senior Club Championships
	All Ireland	Leinster champions	Wicklow champions
Football:	-	-	15
Hurling:	-	-	6

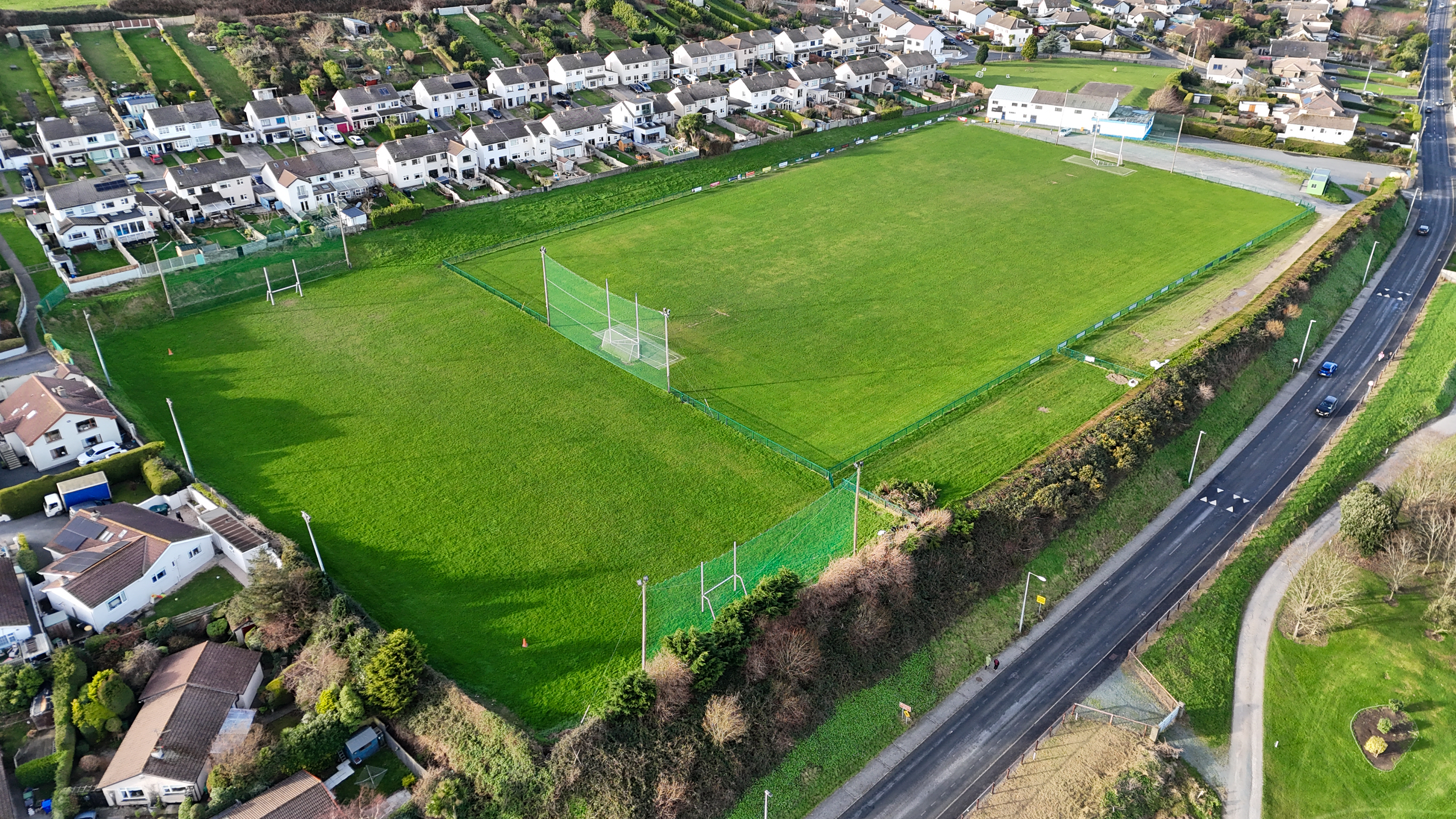
St. Patricks GAA Club Wicklow

St Patrick's GAA Club Wicklow Town is a Gaelic Athletic Association club with teams competing in Hurling, Gaelic Football, and Ladies Football in Wicklow League and Championship competitions.

St Patrick's GAA club is the only GAA club in Wicklow Town and has three men's football teams, Senior, Junior A and Junior C. They have nine juvenile football teams. They also have a senior hurling team and 3 juvenile hurling teams.

The ladies section comprises a senior team, an intermediate team and 5 Juvenile football teams including 2012 County Champions at Under 16, Under 14 and Under 12.

It is one of the largest and most successful clubs in County Wicklow and won the Wicklow Senior Football Championship in 2004, 2006, 2012, 2018, 2019 and 2022.

== Achievements ==
- Wicklow Senior Football Championships: (15)
  - 1950, 1952, 1953, 1955, 1956, 1959, 1960, 1961, 1969, 2004, 2006, 2012, 2018, 2019, 2022
- Wicklow Senior Hurling Championships: (6)
  - 1903, 1926, 1928, 1930, 1991, 1993
