= Glenealy GAA =

Glenealy
- Gleann Fhaídhle
- Founded: 1885
- County: Wicklow
- Nickname: The Glen
- Colours: Red and White
- Grounds: The Park, Glenealy
- Coordinates: 52.96877°N 6.143965°W

Playing kits
Standard colours

Senior Club Championships
	All Ireland	Leinster champions	Wicklow champions
Hurling:	0	0	16
Camogie:	0	1	19

Glenealy Hurling Club (Irish: Gleann Fhaídhle Cumman Iománaíochta) is a Gaelic Athletic Association club located in the parish of Glenealy and Ashford in County Wicklow, Ireland. The club was founded in 1885 as a football club but switched codes to the game of hurling in the early 1920s.

In senior hurling, Glenealy compete annually in the Wicklow Senior Club Hurling Championship, which they have won sixteen times as of 2018.

== History ==
=== Football ===
It was as a football team that Glenealy set out in Wicklow GAA. The first game they played was at Avondale on 20 March 1887, when they suffered defeat at the hands of Glendalough, 0-4 to nil. There was very little coverage for G.A.A. in those days, but they were noted in action again at Newrath on 19 February 1888, and this time they went down to Brittas 0-3 to 0-0. No names were mentioned in relation to either of those matches. Another mention was found of Glenealy footballers in 1907. On 21 April, they beat Killiskey 2-11 to 0-1 in some kind of a tournament game. Byrne, Doyle, Hennessy, Murray, Ellis, Farrell, Newsome and Healy were mentioned as playing well in that game. A small entry was located about the fact that they reached the Wicklow Junior final in 1921. They were beaten in that final by two points to one, but only one name was mentioned and that was Chris Mernagh of Ballinacor. Subsequent research indicated that the Glenealy team of that year included: Tom Porter (goal), Jack Horgan, Jack Jordan, Gen Dunne, Mick Durneen, Jack Flynn, Mick Dunbar, Frank Newsome, Paddy Doyle, Jim Porter, Bill 'Budget' Glynn, Lar 'Cricket' Byrne, Jack 'Bough' Byrne, Jim 'Doctor' Byrne, Jack 'Cocker' Byrne. Subs: Hugh Cooney, Jim 'Can' Byrne and Paddy 'Tige' Byrne.

=== Hurling ===
In 2013 at Aughrim GAA grounds, Glenealy senior hurlers completed the club's first ever '4 in a row' of Wicklow SHC titles by defeating Bray Emmets 0-17 to 0-14.

On 5 October 2014 at Aughrim GAA grounds, Glenealy senior hurlers were denied their first ever '5 in a row' when they lost by the narrowest of margins to last year's beaten finalists Bray Emmets. Despite a strong start to the second half when Glenealy stormed ahead, the final score was 2-09 (15) to 1-11 (14).

Glenealy won their 15th SHC title with a 2-12 to 0-11 victory over Bray Emmets at Aughrim in October 2017.

In November 2018, Glenealy retained the Senior Championship with a 4-10 to 1-12 victory over old rivals Carnew.

== Honours ==
- Wicklow Senior Hurling Championship: 1957, 1958, 1959, 1975, 1986, 1996, 2003, 2005, 2007, 2008, 2010, 2011, 2012, 2013, 2017, 2018
- Leinster Intermediate Club Hurling Championship Runner Up 2017
- 125 Trophy: 2009
- Wicklow Intermediate Hurling Championship: 2008, 2012, 2014, 2017
- Wicklow Junior Hurling Championship: 1951, 1971, 1987, 1996, 2010
- Wicklow U-21 Hurling Championship: 1982
- Wicklow Minor Hurling Championship: 1946, 1947, 1950, 1951, 1952, 1960, 1961, 1964, 1978, 1997, 2008 (B), 2011, 2022
