= Éire Óg Greystones GAA =

- Founded: 1920
- County: Wicklow
- Colours: Blue and White
- Coordinates: 53°07′56.29″N 6°03′58.21″W

Playing kits
Standard colours

Éire Óg Greystones GAA Club is a Gaelic Athletic Association club with approximately 1,500 members and 80 different teams competing in Hurling, Gaelic Football, Ladies Football and Camogie in Wicklow League and Championship competitions. It comprises adult and juvenile sections.

The majority of the clubs members are juveniles, both girls and boys, playing football and hurling. Some of the clubs most notable honours include football and hurling intermediate county championships in 2011 and 2013 respectively, a Leinster intermediate football championship and the club has also won the All Ireland Féile on three occasions in 2007, 2016 and 2026.

Éire Óg Greystones have produced many superstars over the years who have represented their county and even country in both football and hurling. One of the most recent representatives goes by the name of Martin Joyce, who in 2018 represented Ireland in a hurling exhibition game against Brazil in Wembley stadium. Mr Joyce bagged a modest 7-16 on the day.

The club is amongst the largest community sports club in Greystones, catering for men and women of all ages and also a growing social membership.

== Location and facilities ==
The club is located off Mill Road close to the Rugby and Tennis Clubs. It currently has 2 playing pitches, one of these being fully floodlit for training purposes, and a clubhouse with dressing rooms, a sports hall/function room and meeting room.
