= Kiltegan GAA =

Gaelic sports club in County Wicklow, Ireland

- Naomh Teagáin
- Founded: 1964
- County: Wicklow
- Colours: White, Red, Green, Yellow
- Coordinates: 52.903406°N 6.607208°W

Playing kits
Standard colours

Senior Club Championships
	All Ireland	Leinster champions	Wicklow champions
Football:	0	0	2
Hurling:	0	0	8

Kiltegan GAA Club (official title "Naomh Teagáin GAA club") is a GAA club located in Kiltegan, County Wicklow. The club was founded in 1964, and its catchment area covers the villages of Kiltegan, Rathdangan, and surrounding areas.

The club is represented in youth competitions by the juvenile club Michael Dwyers which is a combination of the GAA clubs in Kiltegan, Ballymanus and Knockananna.

== History ==
Kiltegan won its first Wicklow SFC title in 1986 and followed this up by winning its first Wicklow SHC title in 1987. Kiltegan subsequently won the Wicklow Senior Hurling Championship in 1993, 1994, 1995, 1997, 1998, 1999 and 2001. Kiltegan won the Wicklow Senior Football Championship in 2008 in a historic year for the club where they also captured the Wicklow Junior A and Junior C titles.

== Achievements ==
- Wicklow Senior Hurling Championships: (8) 1987, 1993, 1994, 1995, 1997, 1998, 1999, 2001
- Wicklow Senior Football Championships: (2) 1986, 2008

== Notable players ==
Notable club members include Peter Keogh, who was an administrator and journalist with the local Wicklow People newspaper.

Seanie Furlong scored 32–305 in a Wicklow Senior football career spanning from 2008 until 2021

Rory Finn played Senior football for Wicklow from 2007 until 2021

Pádraig O' Toole is a current member of the Wicklow Senior Football team. He has also enjoyed success with IT Carlow, named wing forward on the 2020 Higher Education GAA team of the year after IT Carlow's run to the Sigerson Cup final
