= Aughrim County Ground =

Stadium in Aughrim, Ireland

- Páirc Imeartha Contae Eachroma
- Echelon Park Aughrim, O'Byrne Park
- Interactive map of Aughrim County Ground
- Location: Rednagh Road, Aughrim, County Wicklow, Ireland
- Coordinates: 52°51′9.58″N 6°20′7.29″W
- Public transit: none
- Owner: Wicklow GAA
- Capacity: 7,000
- Field size: 145 x 86 m (159 x 94 yds)
- Surface: grass

Aughrim County Ground, known for sponsorship reasons as Echelon Park Aughrim, is a GAA stadium in Aughrim, County Wicklow, Ireland. Aughrim County Ground is the name of the home of Gaelic Games for County Wicklow (Gaelic football, Hurling, Camogie, Ladies Football) team. The ground has a capacity of about 7,000. The name "O'Byrne Park" was occasionally used in the past, but this has never been the official name: this mistake that came about because of the Irish name for the local village of Aughrim, "Aughrim of the O'Byrnes" (Eachdhruim Uí Bhroin). Also known locally as "The Pitch", or just "The Field".

== See also ==
- List of Gaelic Athletic Association stadiums
- List of stadiums in Ireland by capacity
