= Wicklow GAA =

County board of the Gaelic Athletic Association in Ireland

- Irish: Cill Mhantáin
- Nickname(s): The Garden County
- Province: Leinster
- Dominant sport: Gaelic football
- Ground(s): Aughrim County Ground
- County colours: Blue Gold

County teams
- NFL: Division 4
- NHL: Division 2A
- Football Championship: Tailteann Cup
- Hurling Championship: Christy Ring Cup
- Ladies' Gaelic football: Brendan Martin Cup
- Camogie: Máire Ní Chinnéide Cup

The Wicklow County Board of the Gaelic Athletic Association (GAA) (Irish: Cumann Lúthchleas Gael, Coiste Chontae Cill Mhantáin) or Wicklow GAA is one of the 32 county boards of the GAA in Ireland, and is responsible for Gaelic games in County Wicklow. The county board is also responsible for the Wicklow county teams.

The county football team plays in the Leinster Senior Football Championship. Wicklow has had very little success at senior level, their first senior title coming in the 2026 Tailteann Cup.

The county hurling team competes in the Christy Ring Cup, the third tier of the All-Ireland Senior Hurling Championship. The county reached the final in both the 2011 and 2012 cups, losing to Kerry and London respectively.

== Governance ==
Christopher Byrne served as chairman of the Wicklow County Board between 1931 and 1954.

== Football ==
=== Clubs ===
Wicklow's biggest achievement remains the All-Ireland Senior Club Football Championship won by the Baltinglass club in 1990.

Valleymount's pitch is located astride the Poulaphouca and amid water in the west of the county.

=== County team ===
The county football team has never won a Leinster Senior Football Championship (SFC).

However, Bray Emmets, the leading side of the early 1900s, won Leinster and All-Ireland honours when they were playing in the Dublin Championship. Wicklow were twice proclaimed Leinster champions for short periods. Bray were representing Wicklow in 1889, and when they beat Newtown Blues of Drogheda by 1–7 to 1–4 they claimed that they had won the "final of Leinster" because Queens County or Kilkenny had not shown up for a final. But four days later the result was quashed. In 1897 they became Leinster champions for a week. A downpour caused Dublin to presume the Leinster final would not be played, Dublin went home, the referee awarded a walkover to Wicklow. But the following meeting of the Central Council ordered the match to be replayed and Wicklow lost by 1–9 to 0–3.

After former Kerry manager and player Mick O'Dwyer had taken over as Wicklow manager, the county team won the 2007 Tommy Murphy Cup, defeating Antrim in dramatic fashion with a late Tommy Gill goal in extra-time, securing the Wicklow senior footballers a second ever national trophy, and first ever win in Croke Park. As Wicklow were a Division 4 team they were not permitted to enter the 2007 backdoor. Going into the 2008 championship, Wicklow had not won a championship game since beating London on 8 June 2002 and had not won a Leinster Championship 1st round proper game since beating Longford by 1 point in 1996 (they won a Leinster group game in 2000, but this was the only year under that format). They faced a heavily fancied Kildare in the 1st round and completed arguably their greatest ever championship win beating Kildare 0–13 to 0–9, this was also their first ever championship win at Croke Park, they went on to lose narrowly to Laois in the Quarter-Final. Again as they were a Division 4 team they were not permitted to enter the qualifiers, so they went on to try to defend the Tommy Murphy Cup but ultimately lost to Antrim in the final. The 2009 Championship was one of the most memorable in Wicklow's history, they won their Leinster 1st-round game against Longford by 2–12 to 1–13 before narrowly losing to Westmeath in the next round by 0–16 to 1–10. Division 4 teams were allowed to enter the Qualifiers again by 2009 and so Wicklow began their campaign by beating Fermanagh 0–17 to 1–11 in the 1st round, they then comfortably beat Cavan by 1–12 to 0–8 in the 2nd round, they dramatically beat Down by 1–15 to 0–17 thanks to a late 45' that was scored by Tony Hannon before their famous run finally came to an end when Kildare beat them by 1–16 to 2–9 in the last round of the Qualifiers. In 2010, Wicklow beat Carlow in the 1st round of the Leinster championship but again narrowly lost out in the Quarter-final, this time to Westmeath by a single point, 0–15 to 1–11 but they were unable to repeat their historic 2009 Qualifier run losing out to Cavan in the 1st round, agonisingly by a single point again, 0–15 to 2–8. Wicklow's 2011 Leinster campaign started poorly with a 0–12 to 0–5 1st round defeat by Kildare; however, they bounced back well, defeating Sligo by 1–18 to 0–16 in the 1st round of the Qualifiers, in the 2nd round they drew with Armagh 0–19 to 2–13 before losing the replay at home by 2–9 to 0–10. This brought an end to Mick O'Dwyer's five years as manager of the Wicklow footballers.

In July 2026, Wicklow beat Down in the 2026 Tailteann Cup final. It was the county's first senior title.

== Hurling ==
=== Clubs ===
The Wicklow Senior Hurling Championship consists of eight clubs. Record Champions are Carnew Emmets with 20 titles in total.

=== County team ===
Wicklow won the All-Ireland Junior Hurling Championship in 1967 and 1971 and the Kehoe Cup on seven occasions: in 1989, 1991, 1998, 2000, 2001, 2002 and 2003.

Wicklow won the Nicky Rackard Cup in 2023.

Wicklow currently plays in the Christy Ring Cup, the third highest tier of county competitions.

== Schools ==
There is a very strong emphasis on Gaelic games in schools in Wicklow, both in primary and secondary schools. In almost all cases coaching is done on a voluntary basis by teachers who may have links to local GAA clubs.

The county's vocational schools team has won 12 Leinster and 3 All-Ireland Championships, the last coming in 2006.

== Garden County Academy ==
The Garden County Academy is Wicklow GAA's juvenile development squad system for football and hurling, with squads from under-13 to minor level.

The academy in its current format was born in 2014 after a group of concerned GAA members from around the county came together to formulate a plan to improve underage football structures in the county. The key motivation for the group was that the existing games development structure operated by Wicklow County Board was not producing players able to compete with other Leinster counties, noting that Wicklow remains the only county not to have won a senior Leinster championship in either football or hurling, despite having one of the largest populations in the province. One of the stated aims of the group was to win a Leinster Minor Football Championship within ten years.

An independent group initially consisting of Niall O'Brien (Kiltegan), Joe O'Brien (Kiltegan) and Gerry Grehan (Laragh) presented the case for a major overhaul of the academy to Wicklow County Board in 2013, following months of research and focus groups. Out of this exercise developed the first Garden County Academy committee, reporting to the county board, with the remit to develop a new county football development squad system:

- Gerry Grehan – Chairman
- Niall O'Brien – Secretary
- Joe O'Brien
- Robert Walsh
- Gavin Wynne
- Patrick McWalter
- Hugh Kenny
- Martin Fitzgerald
- Brendan Smyth
- Daragh Gregan
- Philip McGillicuddy
- Owen Doyle

The new structure saw a complete rebrand and reorganisation of the squads from 2014, with a threefold increase in the number of players on county football development squads. In addition, forty new volunteer coaches were recruited to coach the expanded squads. A separate part of the original plan which aimed to address the standard of football in the county's secondary schools was not implemented. At the end of the first season, Niall O'Brien, Joe O'Brien and Gerry Grehan resigned from the committee.

The work of the academy showed the first signs of success in a historic 2018 season, when the Wicklow minor football team defeated both Dublin and Meath in the Leinster Championship, before drawing with Kildare in the semi-final and narrowly losing the replay.

== Camogie ==
Wicklow was among the foundation members of the Camogie Association, several Bray members won All Ireland medals with Dublin, and the county supplied all the members of the Irish team that controversially competed in the 1924 Tailteann Games. Lucy Cullen-Byrne served as president of the Camogie Association). The county won the Leinster Junior Championship in 1964, and contested the Máire Ní Chinnéide Cup finals of 2008, 2009 and 2011. They won Division 5 of the National Camogie League in 2009. Knockananna won Division 1 Féile na nGael 1975 while Avoca won the Caithlín Ní Thoimín Shield in 1979 and Kiltegan won the Coiste Chontae an Chláir Shield at Féile na nGael in 1999.

Under Camogie's National Development Plan 2010–2015, "Our Game, Our Passion", five new camogie clubs were to be established in the county by 2015.

Wicklow were beaten by Monaghan in the 2011 All Ireland Junior B Camogie Championship Final and won the Nancy Murray Cup in 2023.

== Ladies' football ==
Ann McGillycuddy of Wicklow won the inaugural ladies' All-Ireland Kick Fada Championship in 2001.

- All-Ireland Junior Ladies' Football Championships: 2
  - 1990, 2011
