= 2018–19 All-Ireland Senior Club Football Championship =

- Dates: 21 October 2018 – 17 March 2019
- Teams: 32
- Sponsor: Allied Irish Bank
- Champions: Corofin (4th title); Micheál Lundy & Ciarán McGrath (captain)
- Runners-up: Dr Crokes

The 2018–19 All-Ireland Senior Club Football Championship was the 49th annual Gaelic football club championship since its establishment in the 1970–71 season. The winning team received the Andy Merrigan Cup.

The defending champion was Corofin. Corofin defeated Nemo Rangers in the final on 17 March 2018 to retain the title. It was the club's fourth title.

== Format ==
County Championships

All thirty-two counties in Ireland and London play their county senior championships between their top gaelic football clubs. Each county decides the format for their county championship. The format can be straight knockout, double-elimination, a league, groups, etc. or a combination.

Only single club teams are allowed to enter the All-Ireland Club championship. If a team which is an amalgamation of two or more clubs, a divisional team or a university team wins a county's championship, a single club team will represent that county in the provincial championship as determined by that county's championship rules. Normally it is the club team that exited the championship at the highest stage.

Provincial Championships

Connacht, Leinster, Munster and Ulster each organise a provincial championship for their participating county champions. The Kilkenny senior champions play in the Leinster Intermediate Club Football Championship. Beginning in 2018–19, London compete in the Connacht championship. In previous years they played one of the provincial champions in a single match in December referred to as a quarter-final.

All matches are knock-out. Two ten minute periods of extra time are played each way if it's a draw at the end of normal time in all matches including the final. If the score is still level after extra time the match is replayed.

All-Ireland

The two semi-finals between the four provincial champions are usually played on a Saturday in mid February. The All-Ireland Club SFC final was played at Croke Park 17 March (St Patrick's Day).

All matches are knock-out. Two ten minute periods of extra time are played each way if it's a draw at the end of normal time in the semi-finals or final. If the score is still level after extra time the match is replayed.

== County Finals ==
=== Connacht County & London Finals ===
Galway SFC

28 October 2018 Final	Corofin	0-07 (07) – (07) 0-07	Mountbellew–Moylough	Salthill
14:30 GMT (UTC+0)				Venue: Pearse Stadium
				Referee: James Molloy

4 November 2018 Replay	Corofin	1-08 (11) – (05) 0-05	Mountbellew–Moylough	Salthill
15:30 GMT (UTC+0)				Venue: Pearse Stadium
				Referee: Tomas O Flatharta

Leitrim SFC

14 October 2018 Final	Aughawillan	0-14 (14) – (12) 1-09	Mohill	Carrick-on-Shannon
15:30 IST (UTC+1)		(HT: 0-07 – 1-07)		Venue: Páirc Seán Mac Diarmada
				Referee: Patrick Guckian

London SFC

21 October 2018 Final	Fulham Irish	1-14 (17) – (17) 1-14	Tír Chonaill Gaels	Ruislip
15:30 BST (UTC+1)				Venue: McGovern Park

28 October 2018 Replay	Fulham Irish	0-13 (13) – (15) 0-15	Tír Chonaill Gaels	Ruislip
15:30 BST (UTC+1)				Venue: McGovern Park

Mayo SFC

20 October 2018 Final	Ballintubber	0-12 (12) – (11) 1-08	Breaffy	Castlebar
20:00 IST (UTC+1)		(HT: 0-06 – 1-02)		Venue: McHale Park
	Pts: Cillian O’Connor (7, 6f), Steven O’Malley (2), Damien Coleman, Alan Dillon, Diarmuid O’Connor		Gls: Peter Dravins; Pts: Conor O’Shea (3, 3f), Tommy O’Reilly (2), Gareth Dunne, Robbie Hennelly ('45), Robert Fadden	Referee: Vincent Neary (Bonnicolon)

Roscommon SFC

14 October 2018 Final	St Brigid's	1-12 (15) – (27) 4-15	Clann na nGael	Roscommon
15:30 IST (UTC+1)				Venue: Dr Hyde Park
				TV: TG4

Sligo SFC

14 October 2018 Final	Tourlestrane	1-12 (15) – (08) 0-08	Tubbercurry	Enniscrone

=== Leinster County Finals ===
Carlow SFC

7 October 2018 Final	Éire Óg	0-09 (09) – (05) 0-05	Palatine	Carlow
15:45 IST (UTC+1)				Venue: Dr Cullen Park
				Referee: Jonathan Murphy

Dublin SFC

29 October 2018 Final	Kilmacud Crokes	2-12 (18) – 0-13 (13)	St Jude's	Dublin
17:00 IST (UTC+1)				Venue: Parnell Park
				Referee: Sean McCarthy

Kildare SFC

21 October 2018 Final	Moorefield	2-12 (18) – (15) 2-09	Athy	Newbridge
15:30 IST (UTC+1)				Venue: St Conleth's Park

Kilkenny SFC

The Kilkenny SFC champions take part in the Leinster Club Intermediate Football Championship.

29 July 2018 Final	Mullinavat	5-11 (26) – (15) 2-09	Muckalee

Laois SFC

14 October 2018 Final	Portlaoise	2-16 (22) – (16) 1-13	O'Dempseys	Portlaoise
15:30 IST (UTC+1)				Venue: O'Moore Park

Longford SFC

7 October 2018 Final	Abbeylara	0-06 (06) – (06) 0-06	Mullinalaghta	Longford
16:00 IST (UTC+1)				Venue: Pearse Park
				Referee: Donal Kane

14 October 2018 Replay	Abbeylara	1-02 (05) – (20) 2-14	Mullinalaghta	Longford
15:45 IST (UTC+1)		(HT: 1-01 – 1-07)		Venue: Pearse Park
				Referee: Fergal Kelly (Ballymahon)

Louth SFC

21 October 2018 Final	Newtown Blues	1-11 (14) – (13) 1-10	Naomh Máirtín	Drogheda
15:30 IST (UTC+1)				Venue: O'Raghaillaighs
				Referee: Jonathan Conlon

Meath SFC

14 October 2018 Final	St Peter's, Dunboyne	1-11 (14) – (09) 0-09	Summerhill	Navan
15:30 IST (UTC+1)		(HT: 0-04 – 0-05)		Venue: Páirc Tailteann
	Gls: Stuart Lowndes; Pts: Robert McCarthy (7, 5f), Donal Lenihan (f), Liam Byrne, David McEntee, Cathal Lacey		Pts: Barry Dardis (4, 4f), David Larkin (2), Michael Byrne, Sean Dalton, Padraig Geraghty	Referee: Liam O'Brien (Duleek/Bellewstown)

Offaly SFC

14 October 2018 Final	Rhode	1-18 (21) – (10) 0-10	Ferbane	Tullamore
16:00 IST (UTC+1)				Venue: O'Connor Park

Westmeath SFC

21 October 2018 Final	St Loman's	1-11 (14) – (18) 2-12	Mullingar Shamrocks	Mullingar
15:30 IST (UTC+1)				Venue: Cusack Pack
	Gls: Ken Casey; Pts: John Heslin (9, 7f), TJ Cox, David Windsor		Gls: Denis Corroon, Paddy Fagan; Pts: Dean Moore (5, 2f), Denis Corroon (4, 3f), Micheal Curley, Simon Quinn, Alan Cashman	Referee: Niall Ward

Wexford SFC

14 October 2018 Final	Shelmaliers	2-11 (17) – (17) 2-11	Kilanerin–Ballyfad	Wexford
15:15 IST (UTC+1)				Venue: Wexford Park
				Referee: John Carton

20 October 2018 Replay	Shelmaliers	4-14 (28) – (10) 1-07	Kilanerin–Ballyfad	Wexford
15:45 IST (UTC+1)		(HT: 1-06 – 0-01)		Venue: Wexford Park
				Referee: Sean Whelan (St Martin's)

Wicklow SFC

14 October 2018 Final	Rathnew	0-13 (13) – (13) 1-10	St Patrick's	Aughrim
15:00 IST (UTC+1)				Venue: Aughrim County Ground

27 October 2018 Replay	Rathnew	v	St Patrick's	Aughrim
15:00 IST (UTC+1)				Venue: Aughrim County Ground

=== Munster County Finals ===
Clare SFC

Final	Ennistymon	v	St Joseph's, Milltown Malbay

Cork SFC

Final	St Finbarr's	v	Duhallow

Kerry SFC

Final	Dr Crokes	v	Dingle

Limerick SFC

21 October 2018 Final	Adare	1-13 (16) – (12) 0-12	Ballylanders	Newcastle West
15:00 IST (UTC+1)		(HT: 0-09 – 0-05)

Tipperary SFC

Final	Moyle Rovers	v	Ardfinnan

Waterford SFC

28 October 2018 Final	Kilrossanty	0-07 (7) – (9) 0-09	The Nire–Fourmilewater	Dungarvan
18:00 GMT (UTC)				Venue: Fraher Field
		Report

=== Ulster County Finals ===
Antrim SFC

21 October 2018 Final	Cargin	0-05 (05) – (04) 0-04	Creggan	Ahogill
15:30 IST (UTC+1)				Venue: Fr McGuigan Park
				Referee: Karol Doherty (Rasharkin)

Armagh SFC

21 October 2018 Final	Crossmaglen	0-24 (24) – (18) 1-15	Ballymacnab	Armagh
16:00 IST (UTC+1)		(HT: 0-11 – 1-11)		Venue: Athletic Grounds
				Referee: Oliver Hearty (Belleek)

Cavan SFC

21 October 2018 Final	Crosserlough	1-13 (16) – (17) 2-11	Castlerahan	Cavan
15:30 IST (UTC+1)		(HT: 0-07 – 0-06)		Venue: Breffni Park
				Referee: Conor Dourneen

Derry SFC

21 October 2018 Final	Lavey	0-12 (12) – (15) 1-12	Coleraine	Derry
15:30 IST (UTC+1)		(HT: 1-05 – 0-02)		Venue: Celtic Park
				Referee: Damien Harkin (Slaughtmanus)

Donegal SFC

21 October 2018 Final	Gaoth Dobhair	0-17 (17) – (10) 1-07	Naomh Conaill	Ballybofey
16:00 IST (UTC+1)				Venue: MacCumhaill Park
				Referee: Shaun McLaughlin; TV: TG4

Down SFC

14 October 2018 Final	Burren	2-12 (18) – (15) 2-09	Kilcoo	Newry
16:00 IST (UTC+1)		(HT: 0-09 – 2-03)		Venue: Páirc Esler
				Referee: Con Reynolds

Fermanagh SFC

30 September 2018 Final	Ederney St Joseph's	0-10 (10) – (22) 2-16	Derrygonnelly Harps	Enniskillen
16:00 IST (UTC+1)		(HT: 0-07 – 1-07)		Venue: Brewster Park
	Pts: Mark McCauley (4, 4f), Marty McGrath (2), Aaron Dennison (2), Chris Snow, Conor McGee		Gls: Paul Ward, Ryan Jones; Pts: Garvan Jones (5, 3f), Paul Ward (3), Conall Jones (3, 1f), Ryan Jones (2), Gary McKenna (2, 1f), Neil Gallagher	Referee: James Lewis (Newtownbutler)

Monaghan SFC

7 October 2018 Final	Scotstown	1-13 (16) – (13) 0-13	Ballybay Pearse Brothers	Clones
15:30 IST (UTC+1)		(HT: 0-08 – 0-04)		Venue: St Tiernach's Park
	Gls: Conor McCarthy; Pts: Conor McCarthy (3, 2f), Shane Carey (3, 2f), Francis Maguire (2), Rory Beggan (2, 2f), Dónal Morgan, Kieran Hughes, Jamie McCarey		Pts: Dessie Ward (5), Paul Finlay (3, 2f), Shane McGuinness (2), Mark McArdle, Brent Wylie, Thomas Kerr	Referee: Anthony Marron (Corduff); Attendance: 4,496; TV: TG4

Tyrone SFC

21 October 2018 Final	Killyclogher	1-07 (10) – (17) 2-11	Coalisland	Omagh
16:00 IST (UTC+1)		(HT: 1-04 – 0-05)		Venue: Healy Park
	Gls: Tiernan McCann; Pts: Mark Bradley (3, 2f), Aidan Kelly, Conall McCann ('45), Simon O'Neill, PT Cunningham (f)		Gls: Paddy McNiece, Peter McGahan; Pts: Paddy McNiece (3, 3f), Brian Toner (2, 2f), Tiernan Quinn (2), Cormac O'Hagan (2, 2f), Bailey Leonard	Referee: Sean Hurson (Galbally)

== Provincial championships ==
=== Connacht ===
Quarter-finals
Tourlestrane (Sligo)	0-05
Ballintubber (Mayo)	0-06
Clann na nGael (Roscommon)	1-15
Tír Chonaill Gaels (London)	1-10

Semi-finals
Aughawillan (Leitrim)	1-08
Ballintubber (Mayo)	3-11
Corofin (Galway)	4-22
Clann na nGael (Roscommon)	0-07

Final
Ballintubber (Mayo)	1-09
Corofin (Galway)	2-10

==== Quarter-finals ====
4 November 2018 Quarter-final	Clann na nGael	1-15 (18) – (13) 1-10	Tír Chonaill Gaels	Roscommon
13:00 IST (UTC+1)				Venue: Dr Hyde Park
	Gls: G Pettit 1 Pts: D Shine 9 (7fs), C Lennon 3, D Connaughton 1, U Harney 1, D Pettit 1.	Report	Gls: E Murray 1 (pen). Pts: L Gavaghan 6 (4fs), K Butler 3, B Mullin 1.

4 November 2018 Quarter-final	Tourlestrane	0-05 (5) – (6) 0-06	Ballintubber	Enniscrone
14:00 IST (UTC+1)
	Pts: C Henry 3 (1f), S Dunne 1, O Kennedy 1.	Report	Pts: C O'Connor 5 (5f), D O'Connor 1.

==== Semi-finals ====
11 November 2018 Semi-final	Aughawillan	1-08 (11) – (20) 3-11	Ballintubber	Carrick-on-Shannon
14:00 IST (UTC+1)
	Pts: G Plunkett 0-5 (0-1f), C Gilheany 1-1, P Dolan, M Plunkett 0-1 each.	Report	Gls: J Finnerty 2, A Plunkett 1 Pts: C O’Connor 6 (6f), A Plunkett 3, D Coleman 1, B Walsh 1.

11 November 2018 Semi-final	Clann na nGael	0-07 (7) – (34) 4-22	Corofin	Roscommon
14:00 IST (UTC+1)				Venue: Dr Hyde Park
	Pts: D Shine 2 (2f), E Kenny 1, C Shine 1, C Callinan 1, C Lennon 1 (1f), J Dunning 1.	Report	Gls: J Leonard 2, M Lundy 1, C Brady 1. Pts: J Leonard 6 (3f 1 45), M Lundy 3, D Canney 2, D Wall 2, D Silke 2, G Sice (1f) 2, L Silke 1, C Brady 1, R Steede 1, Martin Farragher 1, Mike Farragher 1.

==== Final ====
25 November 2018
2:00 pm
Final

Ballintubber	1-09 (12) – (16) 2-10	Corofin
Gls: J Finnerty 1 Pts: C O’Connor 4 (2f), A Dillon 2, A Plunkett 1, J Gibbons 1, M Plunkett 1		Gls: M Lundy 1, I Burke 1. Pts: G Sice 3 (3f), C Brady 1, L Silke 1, K Molloy 1, Michael Farragher 1, J Leonard 1, Martin Faragher 1, M Lundy 1.

McHale Park, Castlebar

=== Leinster ===
Preliminary round
Shelmaliers (Wexford)	1-02
St Peter's, Dunboyne (Meath)	1-12
Mullingar Shamrocks (Westmeath)	1-06
Moorefield (Kildare)	2-09
St Patrick's (Wicklow)	1-09
Rhode (Offaly)	2-16

Quarter-finals
St Peter's, Dunboyne (Meath)	0-7
Kilmacud Crokes (Dublin)	2-17
Moorefield (Kildare)	1-11
Portlaoise (Laois)	1-14
Rhode (Offaly)	0-7
Mullinalaghta (Longford)	1-6
Newtown Blues (Louth)	0-8
Éire Óg (Carlow)	2-9

Semi-finals
Kilmacud Crokes (Dublin)	1-17
Portlaoise (Laois)	3-8
Mullinalaghta (Longford)	2-15
Éire Óg (Carlow)	0-3

Final
Kilmacud Crokes (Dublin)	1-06
Mullinalaghta (Longford)	1-08

==== Preliminary round ====
28 October 2018 Preliminary round	Shelmaliers	1-02 (05) – (15) 1-12	St Peter's, Dunboyne	Wexford
13:30 IST (UTC+1)				Venue: Wexford Park
	Gls: R Banville 1 Pts: B Malone 1, E Doyle 1.	Report	Gls: S Comiskey 1. Pts: R McCarthy 4; D Lenihan 3; S Lowndes 2; S McEntee 1, C Finn 1, M Dunne 1.	Referee: Barry Tiernan (Dublin)

28 October 2018 Preliminary Round	Mullingar Shamrocks	1-06 (09) – (15) 2-09	Moorefield	Mullingar
13:30 IST (UTC+1)				Venue: Cusack Park
	Gls: D Moore 1 Pts: T Adamson 2, D Corroon (1f) 2, D Moore 1, P Fagan 1.	Report	Gls: A Tyrrell 2. Pts: A Tyrrell 4 (1f), E O'Connor 3 (2f), R Sweeney 1, N Hurley Lynch 1.	Referee: David Gough (Meath)

28 October 2018 Preliminary Round	St Patrick's	1-09 (12) – (22) 2-16	Rhode	Aughrim
13:30 IST (UTC+1)				Venue: Aughrim County Ground
	Gls: T Kelly 1. Pts: S Duffy 5 (5f), T Kelly 2 (1f), P O'Kane 1, D Healy 1.	Report	Gls: C Heavy 1, A Sullivan 1. Pts: N McNamee 11 (4f), C Heavy 2, A Sullivan 2, N Darby 1 (f).	Referee: Brendan Cawley (Kildare)

==== Quarter-finals ====
11 November 2018 Quarter-final A	St Peter's, Dunboyne	0-07 (7) – (23) 2-17	Kilmacud Crokes	Navan
13:30 GMT (UTC+0)
	Pts: S Lowndes 2, C Finn 1, D McEntee 1 (f), R McCarthy 1, S Lavin 1, C Lowndes 1.	Report	Gls: P Mannion 2. Pts: P Mannion 6 (5fs), P Burke 4 (4fs), A McGowan 1, D Mullin 1, C O'Dwyer 1, C Pearson 1, C O'Connor 1, S Williams 1, C O'Shea 1.

11 November 2018 Quarter-final B	Moorefield	1-11 (14) – (17) 1-14	Portlaoise	Newbridge
13:30 GMT (UTC+0)
	Gls: N Hurley-Lynch 1 Pts: É O’Connor 4 (1f), R Sweeney 2, A Tyrrell 2, E Heavey 2, N Hurley-Lynch 1.	Report	Gls: C Rogers 1. Pts: P Cahillane 7 (3f), C Rogers 2 (2f), B McCormack 2, K Lillis 1, G Dillon 1, R Maher 1.

11 November 2018 Quarter-final C	Rhode	0-07 (7) – (9) 1-06	Mullinalaghta	Tullamore
13:30 GMT (UTC+0)				Venue: O'Connor Park
	Pts: N McNamee 3, D Garry 1, P McPadden 1, R McNamee 1 (f), A Sullivan 1.	Report	Gls: J Matthews 1. Pts: R Brady 2 (1f), D McElligott 1, G Rogers 1, J Keegan 1, J Matthews 1.

11 November 2018 Quarter-final D	Newtown Blues	0-08 (8) – (15) 2-09	Éire Óg	Drogheda
13:30 GMT (UTC+0)
	Pts: A McDonnell 2, C Judge 2 (1f), C Downey 2 (1f) R Carr 1, J Kermode 1.	Report	Gls: B Kavanagh 1, M Ware 1. Pts: D O’Brien 3 (3fs), S Rea 2 (2fs), J Morrissey 1, S Gannon 1, R Dunphy 1, C Blake 1.

==== Semi-finals ====
Semi-final	Kilmacud Crokes	1-17 (20) – (17) 3-08	Portlaoise	Parnell Park
				Venue: Parnell Park
	Gls: D Mullin 1. Pts: P Mannion 5 (2f), P Burke 3 (0-1f), C Pearson 2, D Mullin 2, S Cunningham 1, C O’Connor 1, C Casey 1, A McGowan 1, C Dias 1.	Report	Gls: P Cahillane 1, C Rogers 1, G Dillon 1. Pts: Paul Cahillane 3 (1f), C Boyle 1, B McCormack 1, B Glynn 1, K Lillis 1, R Maher 1.

Semi-final	Mullinalaghta	2-15 (21) – (03) 0-03	Éire Óg	Longford
	Gls: J McGivney 1, A McElligott 1. Pts: D McGivney 4 (3f), R Brady 3, D McElligott 2, J Keegan 2, B Fox 2, G Rogers 1, J Matthews 1.	Report	Pts: D O’Brien 2, C Blake 1.

==== Final ====
9 December 2018
Final

Report

Mullinalaghta	1-08 (11) – (09) 1-06	Kilmacud Crokes
Gls: G Rogers 1. Pts: Rian Brady 4 (1f), D McGivney 2 (1f), A McElligott 1, D McElligott 1.		Gls: P Burke 1. Pts: P Mannion 2 (2f), C Pearson 2, P Burke 1, C Dias 1.

O'Connor Park

=== Munster ===
Round of 16

Quarter-finals
Adare (Limerick)
The Nire – Fourmilewater (Waterford)
Moyle Rovers (Tipperary)
Dr Crokes (Kerry)

Semi-finals
The Nire – Fourmilewater
St Joseph's, Milltown Malbay (Clare)
Dr Crokes (Kerry)
St Finbarr's (Cork)

Final
St Joseph's, Milltown Malbay (Clare)
Dr Crokes (Kerry)

==== Quarter-finals ====
4 November 2018 Quarter-final	Adare	0-12 (12) – (21) 1-18	The Nire –Fourmilewater	Limerick
				Venue: Gaelic Grounds
	Pts: H Bourke 6 (6f), R Bourke 2, S O’Connor 2, S Keely 1.	Report	Gls: T Barron 1. Pts: C Gleeson 4, S Walsh 4, D Guiry 3 (2f), T Guiry 2, S Ryan 2 (1f), C Guiry 1, D Murphy 1 (f), J Barron 1.	Referee: D Murnane (Cork)

4 November 2018 Quarter-final	Moyle Rovers	0-08 (8) – (24) 3-15	Dr Crokes	Ardfinnan
				Venue: Ardfinnan GAA Ground
	Pts: R Power 2, D Ryan 2, L Boland 1, R Mulcahy 1, S Carey 1, R Quigley 1.	Report	Gls: K O'Leary 2, M Potts 1. Pts: T Brosnan 7 (6f), M Burns 3, K O'Leary 2, D Shaw 1, C Cooper 1, D Casey 1.	Referee: J Bermingham (Cork)

==== Semi-finals ====
11 November 2018 Semi-final	Dr Crokes	5-20 (35) – (14) 1-11	St Finbarr's	Killarney
				Venue: Lewis Road
	Gls: D Shaw 1, J Buckley 1, D Casey 1, M Burns 1, J Kiely 1. Pts: T Brosnan 4, D Shaw 3, B Looney 3, C Cooper 3, J Buckley 1, D Casey 1, M Burns 1, J Kiely 1, G White 1, G O’Shea 1, K O’Leary 1.	Report	Gls: E McGreevey 1. Pts: S Sherlock 6 (3 ’45, 2f), R O’Mahony 2, C Dennehy 1, I Maguire 1, D O’Brien 1.	Referee: D O'Mahony (Tipperary)

11 November 2018 Semi-final	The Nire	0-09 (9) – (17) 2-11	Miltown Malbay	Dungarvan
				Venue: Fraher Field
	Pts: J Barron 3, C Gleeson 2 (1f), T Barron 1, D Guiry 1, S Walsh 1, S Ryan 1 (f).		Gls: C Murray 1, S Malone 1. Pts: E Cleary 3 (3f), C Hehir 2, K Malone 2, O Looney 1, C Cleary 1, E Curtin 1, C Murray 1.	Referee: P O'Sullivan (Kerry)

==== Final ====
25 November 2018
Munster final

Report

Dr Crokes	1-21 (24) – (15) 2-09	Miltown Malbay
Gls: D Shaw 1. Pts: T Brosnan 8 (5f), D Casey 3 (2f), K O’Leary 2, B Looney 2, M Burns 2, S Murphy 1 (1 ’45), J Buckley 1, G O’Shea 1, J Kiely 1.		Gls: D McDonagh 1, O Looney 1. Pts: E Cleary 3 (2f), K Malone 2, D McDonagh 2, K Keavey 1, E O’Gorman 1.

Gaelic Grounds, Limerick
Referee: A Kissane (Waterford)

=== Ulster ===
Preliminary round
Scotstown (Monaghan)	2-17
Derrygonnelly Harps (Fermanagh)	1-11

Quarter-finals
Erins Own, Cargin (Antrim)	1-13
Gaoth Dobhair (Donegal)	3-11
Crossmaglen Rangers (Armagh)	0-12
Coalisland (Tyrone)	0-10
Castlerahan (Cavan)	0-11
Eoghan Rua (Derry)	2-11
Burren (Down)	0-10
Scotstown (Monaghan)	0-13

Semi-finals
Gaoth Dobhair (Donegal)	4-11
Crossmaglen Rangers (Armagh)	0-16
Eoghan Rua (Derry)	2-10
Scotstown (Monaghan)	1-14

Final
Gaoth Dobhair (Donegal)	0-13 (aet)
Scotstown (Monaghan)	0-12 (aet)

==== Preliminary round ====
21 October 2018 Preliminary round	Scotstown	2-17 (23) – (14) 1-11	Derrygonnelly Harps	Clones
14:30 IST (UTC+1)		(HT: 0-09 – 1-06)		Venue: St Tiernach's Park
	Gls: D McArdle 1, R McKenna 1. Pts: C McCarthy 5 (3f), S Carey 3 (1f), O Heaphey 2, R Beggan 2 (2f), K Hughes 2, J McDevitt 1, R O’Toole 1, D McArdle 1.	Report	Gls: C Jones 1. Pts: G Jones 4 (2f), C Jones 2, R Jones 2, L Jones 1, P Ward 1, Steven McGullion 1.	Referee: Pádraig Hughes (Armagh)

==== Quarter-finals ====
3 November 2018 Quarter-final B	Crossmaglen	0-12 (12) – (10) 0-10	Coalisland	Armagh
19:00 GMT (UTC+0)		(HT: 0-06 – 0-05)		Venue: Athletic Grounds
	Pts: Rian O'Neill (7, 2f, 1 '45), Oisin O'Neill (2), Michael McNamee, Johnny McKeever, Stephen Morris		Pts: Paddy McNeice (8, 8f), Bailey Leonard, Stephen McNally	Referee: Martin McNally (Monaghan)

4 November 2018 Quarter-final A	Cargin	1-13 (16) – (20) 3-11	Gaoth Dobhair	Belfast
14:30 GMT (UTC+0)		(HT: 0-06 – 2-10)		Venue: Corrigan Park
	Gls: P McCann 1. Pts: J Gribbin 3, M McCann 2; T McCann 2 (2fs), J Crozier 1, J Laverty 1; G McCann 1, M Kane 1, E McGrogan 1, P McCann 1.	Report	Gls: M Carroll 1, K Cassidy 1, C Mulligan 1. Pts: K Cassidy 3, M Carroll 3, E Collum 2, E McGee 1; C Mulligan 1, S Ó Baoill 1 (1f).	Referee: Paul Faloon (Down)

4 November 2018 Quarter-final C	Castlerahan	0-11 (11) – (17) 2-11	Coleraine	Kingscourt
14:30 GMT (UTC+0)		(HT: 0-06 – 2-06)		Venue: Ó Raghallaigh Park
	Pts: S McSweeney 3, C Mackey 2 (1f), O O’Connell 2, S Brady 2, P Smith 1, G Daly 1.	Report	Gls: Colm McGoldrick 2. Pts: Ciaran McGoldrick 3, L McGoldrick 2, R Mooney 1, C Mullen 1, G McWilliams 1, D Mullen (1, Colm McGoldrick 1, M McTaggart 1.	Referee: Ciaran Branagan (Down)

4 November 2018 Quarter-final D	Burren	0-10 (10) – (13) 0-13	Scotstown	Newry
14:30 GMT (UTC+0)		(HT: 0-03 – 0-06)		Venue: Páirc Esler
	Pts: Donal O'Hare (5, 5f), Cathal Foy (2), Eamonn Toner, Sean Murdock, Ryan Treanor (f)		Pts: Shane Carey (5, 2f), Francis Maguire (2), Kieran Hughes (2), Rory Beggan (2, 1f), Donal Morgan, Conor McCarthy (f)	Referee: Sean Hurson (Tyrone)

==== Semi-finals ====
18 November 2018 Semi-final	Coleraine	2-10 (16) – (17) 1-14	Scotstown	Omagh
13:30 GMT (UTC+0)		(HT: 1-07 – 1-06)		Venue: Healy Park
	Gls: Ruairi Mooney, Ciaran Mullan; Pts: Declan Mullan (4), Gavin McWilliams (2, 1f), Ruairi Mooney, Barry Daly, Barry McGoldrick, Colm McGoldrick		Gls: Conor McCarthy; Pts: Rory Beggan (3, 3f), Kieran Hughes (2), Damien McArdle (2), Shane Carey (2, 2f), Conor McCarthy, Ryan O'Toole, Francis Maguire, Darren Hughes, Orin Heaphey	Referee: Ciaran Branagan (Down)

18 November 2018 Semi-final	Gaoth Dobhair	4-11 (23) – (16) 0-16	Crossmaglen	Omagh
15:30 GMT (UTC+0)				Venue: Healy Park
	Gls: Daire O Baoill (3, 1 pen), Kevin Cassidy; Pts: Odhran MacNiallais 0-4 (1f), Kevin Cassidy (2), Eamonn Collum (2, 1f), Niall Friel, Cian Mulligan, Shane Ferry		Pts: Rian O'Neill (8, 6f), Oisin O'Neill (3), Kyle Carragher (2), Tony Kernan (2, 1f), Johnny Hanratty	Referee: Joe McQuillan (Cavan); TV: TG4

==== Final ====
TG4

2 December 2018
2:00 pm
Final

Gaoth Dobhair (Donegal)	0-13 (13) – (12) 0-12 (a.e.t.)	Scotstown (Monaghan)
(HT: 0-05 – 0-05) (FT: 0-11 – 0-11)
Pts: Odhrán MacNiallais (4, 3f), Kevin Cassidy (2), Cian Mulligan, Eamonn Collum, Micheal Carroll, Naoise Ó Baoill, James Carroll (f), Ryan Kelly, Shane Ferry		Pts: Shane Carey (6, 3f), Rory Beggan (2, 1f, 1 '45), Darren Hughes, Kieran Hughes, Conor McCarthy, Damien McArdle

Healy Park, Omagh
Referee: Noel Mooney (Cavan)

== Semi-finals ==
TG4

16 February 2019
13:30 GMT (UTC+0)
Semi-Final

Report

Corofin	2-13 (19) – (15) 1-12	Gaoth Dobhair
Gls: G Sice 1, Martin Farragher 1. Pts: Gary Sice 7 (7f), J Leonard 2 (1f), L Silke 1, D Burke 1, I Burke 1, G Burke 1		Gls: K Cassidy 1. Pts: K Cassidy 2, E Collum 2 (1f), O Mac Niallais 2 (1f), J Carroll 2, C Mulligan 2, D Ó Baoill 1, N Friel 1.

Páirc Seán Mac Diarmada, Carrick-on-Shannon
Referee: Maurice Deegan (Laois)

TG4

16 February 2019
15:30 GMT (UTC+0)
Semi-Final

Report

Dr Crokes	0-18 (18) – (13) 2-7	Mullinalaghta
Pts: T Brosnan 6 (4f), K O’Leary 4, D Shaw 3, D Casey 2 (1f), M Burns 1, G O’Shea 1, B Looney 1.		Gls: G Rogers 1, J Matthews 1. Pts: D McGivney 5 (4f), B Fox 1, D McElligott 1.

Semple Stadium, Thurles
Referee: Sean Hurson (Tyrone)

== Final ==
If the match was level at the end of the normal sixty minutes, two ten-minute periods of extra time were to have been played.

TG4

17 March 2019
3:45 pm
Final

Report

Corofin	2-16 (22) – (10) 0-10	Dr Crokes
Gls: G Sice 1, J Leonard 1. Pts: G Sice 5 (3fs), Martin Farragher 4, J Leonard 3, D Burke 2, Mike Farragher, K Molloy 1 each.		Pts: T Brosnan 5 (4fs), D Casey 3 (2fs), M Burns, C Cooper (f) 1 each.

Croke Park, Dublin
Referee: Barry Cassidy (Derry)

== Bracket ==
For official fixtures and results see All-Ireland Senior Club Football Championship at gaa.ie

Semi-finals
Corofin
Gaoth Dobhair
Dr Crokes
Mullinalaghta

Final

== Statistics ==
=== Top scorers ===
Overall

Rank	Player	Club	Tally	Total	Matches	Average
1	Tony Brosnan	Dr Crokes	0-30	30	5	6.00
2	Gary Sice	Corofin	2-17	23	4	5.75
3	Jason Leonard	Corofin	3-12	21	4	5.25
4	Paul Mannion	Kilmacud Crokes	2-13	19	3	6.33
5	Kevin Cassidy	Gaoth Dobhair	3-09	18	4	4.50
6	Shane Carey	Scotstown	0-16	16	4	4.00
7	Kieran O'Leary	Dr Crokes	2-09	15	5	3.00
7	Rian O'Neill	Crossmaglen Rangers	0-15	15	2	7.50
7	Cillian O'Connor	Ballintubber	0-15	15	3	5.00
8	Niall McNamee	Rhode	0-14	14	2	7.00

In a single game

Rank	Player	Club	Tally	Total	Opposition
1	Jason Leonard	Corofin	2-06	12	Clann na nGael
1	Paul Mannion	Kilmacud Crokes	2-06	12	St Peter's Dunboyne
2	Niall McNamee	Rhode	0-11	11	St Patrick's
3	Adam Tyrrell	Moorefield	2-04	10	Mullingar Shamrocks
3	Gary Sice	Corofin	1-07	10	Gaoth Dobhair
4	Daire Ó Baoill	Gaoth Dobhair	3-00	9	Crossmaglen Rangers
4	Donie Shine	Clann na nGael	0-09	9	Tír Chonaill Gaels
5	Kieran O'Leary	Dr Crokes	2-02	8	Moyle Rovers
5	Gary Sice	Corofin	1-05	8	Dr Crokes
5	Tony Brosnan	Dr Crokes	0-08	8	Miltown Malbay
5	Paddy McNeice	Coalisland Na Fianna	0-08	8	Crossmaglen Rangers
5	Rian O'Neill	Crossmaglen Rangers	0-08	8	Gaoth Dobhair

== TV coverage ==
TG4 continued to broadcast live and deferred club championship games. Eir Sport entered the second year of an agreement to broadcast live Gaelic football and hurling club championship games, including county championships, county finals and provincial and All-Ireland club championship matches.

== Awards ==
Team of the Year

1. Bernard Power (Corofin)
2. Liam Silke (Corofin)
3. Patrick Fox (Mullinalaghta)
4. Odhrán McFadden-Ferry (Gaoth Dobhair)
5. Kieran Molloy (Corofin)
6. Gavin White (Dr Crokes)
7. Donal McElligott (Mullinalaghta)
8. Daithí Burke (Corofin)
9. Odhrán Mac Niallais (Gaoth Dobhair)
10. Gary Sice (Corofin)
11. Kieran O'Leary (Dr Crokes)
12. Jason Leonard (Corofin)
13. Tony Brosnan (Dr Crokes)
14. Kevin Cassidy (Gaoth Dobhair)
15. Martin Farragher (Corofin)

Footballer of the Year

- Kieran Molloy (Corofin)

Also nominated: Kevin Cassidy (Gaoth Dobhair) & Gary Sice (Corofin)
