= Mickey Graham =

Irish Gaelic football player and manager

Personal information
- Native name: Micheál Ó Greacháin (Irish)
- Born: 28 July 1975 (age 51)
- Occupation: Sales Rep
- Height: 5 ft 8 in (173 cm)

Sport
- Sport: Gaelic football
- Position: Full forward
Club
- Years: Club
- Cavan Gaels
Club titles
- Cavan titles: 5
Inter-county
- Years: County
- 1995–2003: Cavan
Inter-county titles
- Ulster titles: 1

Michael Graham (born 28 July 1975) is an Irish Gaelic football manager and former player. He managed the Cavan senior football team from 2018 to 2023, winning the Ulster Senior Football Championship (SFC) in 2020. He previously played for Cavan and was part of the team that won the 1997 Ulster SFC title.

== Playing career ==
=== Club ===
A native of Cavan town, Graham joined the Cavan Gaels club at a young age. Graham played in his first county final in 1998 against Mullahoran. A goal in each half gave Mullahoran the title.

Graham was captain as Cavan Gaels lost the 2000 final to Gowna, but the Gaels came back to beat the same opposition in the 2001 as Graham captained the club to their first title in 23 years. The teams met once again in the 2002 final, with Gowna coming out comfortably on top.

Cavan Gaels were back in the final in 2003, facing Mullahoran. Graham scored 1–1 and was named man of the match as the Gaels regained the title. The Gaels faced Mullahoran again in the 2004 decider. Graham scored 1–2 and received the man of the match award as Cavan Gaels claimed another championship. Graham scored a point in the 2005 final as the Gaels claimed their third championship title in succession.

After relinquishing their crown to Mullahoran in the 2006 final, Graham played in his last county final in 2007. Cavan Gaels got the better of Gowna, giving Graham his fifth championship medal.

=== Inter-county ===
In 1996, Graham was on the Cavan under-21 team that claimed the Ulster championship and reached the All-Ireland final. On 8 September, Graham started the All-Ireland final against Kerry, scoring 1–1 as Cavan suffered a four-point loss.

At this stage Graham had joined the senior squad. Cavan faced Derry in the 1997 Ulster SFC final, and Graham started the game on the bench. Graham came on in the second half as Cavan claimed a first Ulster SFC title in 28 years by a single point.

Cavan reached the Ulster SFC final again in 2001, with Tyrone as the opponent. Graham was brought on as a substitute in the second half, and a strong finish from Tyrone meant they came out winners on a 1–13 to 1–11 scoreline.

In 2002, Cavan reached the final of the National Football League, Graham scoring 2–1 in the semi-final win over Roscommon. Graham started the final against Tyrone, with Cavan falling to a nine-point loss.

== Coaching and managerial career ==
=== Club ===
Graham's first managerial job came at Butlersbridge, leading them to the Cavan Junior Football Championship in 2004. He also managed Drumalee to the Cavan Intermediate Football Championship in 2006.

Ahead of the 2016 season, Graham was appointed as manager of Longford club Mullinalaghta St Columba's. He led Mullinalaghta to their first county title in 66 years in 2016. He followed this up by winning championships again in 2017 and 2018. In 2018, Graham managed Mullinalaghta to the Leinster Club final, the first Longford club to reach that stage. Mullinalaghta caused a large upset by beating Dublin club Kilmacud Crokes to become Leinster Club SFC champions. At this stage, Graham had been announced as the next Cavan manager, but continued with Mullinalaghta until their championship ended. Graham's last game with Mullinalaghta was the All-Ireland Club SFC semi-final loss to Dr Crokes in February 2019.

=== Cavan ===
Graham was announced as the manager of the Cavan senior football team on 21 August 2018, succeeding Mattie McGleenan.

Graham's first National League campaign as manager ended in relegation from the top flight after defeat to Dublin. The same year, Graham led Cavan to a first Ulster SFC final since 2001. Cavan lost that game by five points to Donegal.

In 2020, Cavan suffered a second successive relegation after a loss to Roscommon on the final day. Graham then managed Cavan to a second consecutive Ulster SFC final. Cavan claimed a first Ulster SFC title since 1997, with a win against Donegal in the final.

Cavan's poor league form under Graham continued in 2021, ending with relegation to Division 4 after a defeat to Wicklow. Tyrone brought an end to Cavan's reign as Ulster champions in the first round.

In 2022, Graham led Cavan to promotion from Division 4 at the first time of asking, and also won the league final by beating Tipperary. After exiting the Ulster championship to Donegal, Graham managed Cavan to the inaugural final of the Tailteann Cup against Westmeath. Westmeath were winners by a four-point margin. On 8 August 2022, it was announced that Graham would remain manager of Cavan for another two years.

Graham managed Cavan to a second consecutive promotion in 2023, and Cavan also claimed a second consecutive league title with a win over Fermanagh in the final. On 10 July 2023, Graham stepped down as Cavan manager after five seasons of managing the team.

=== Leitrim ===
On 18 September 2023, it was announced that Graham had joined the Leitrim management team under manager Andy Moran. Graham's first season there saw Leitrim promoted to Division 3 of the National League. After Moran stepped down at the end of the 2024 season, Graham was announced to succeed him as manager on a three-year term. However only a few months later he stepped down to join the couching team in Galway.

== Honours ==
=== Player ===
Cavan

- Ulster Senior Football Championship: 1997
- Ulster Under-21 Football Championship: 1996

Cavan Gaels

- Cavan Senior Football Championship: 2001 (c), 2003, 2004, 2005, 2007

=== Manager ===
Cavan

- Ulster Senior Football Championship: 2020
- National Football League Division 3: 2023
- National Football League Division 4: 2022

Mullinalaghta St Columba's

- Leinster Senior Club Football Championship: 2018
- Longford Senior Football Championship: 2016, 2017, 2018

Drumalee

- Cavan Intermediate Football Championship: 2006

Butlersbridge

- Cavan Junior Football Championship: 2004

Sporting positions
Preceded by Mattie McGleenan	Cavan Senior Football Manager; 2018–2023	Succeeded by Raymond Galligan
Preceded by Andy Moran	Leitrim Senior Football Manager; 2024	Succeeded by Steven Poacher
