= Captain (Gaelic games) =

Position in a Gaelic games team

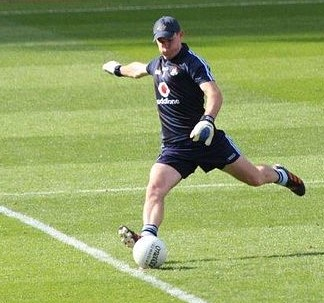
Dublin footballer Stephen Cluxton holds the record for most All-Ireland titles won as captain (7).

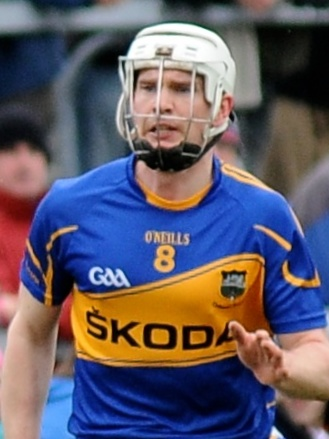
Brendan Maher captained Tipperary to the All-Ireland SHC in 2016.

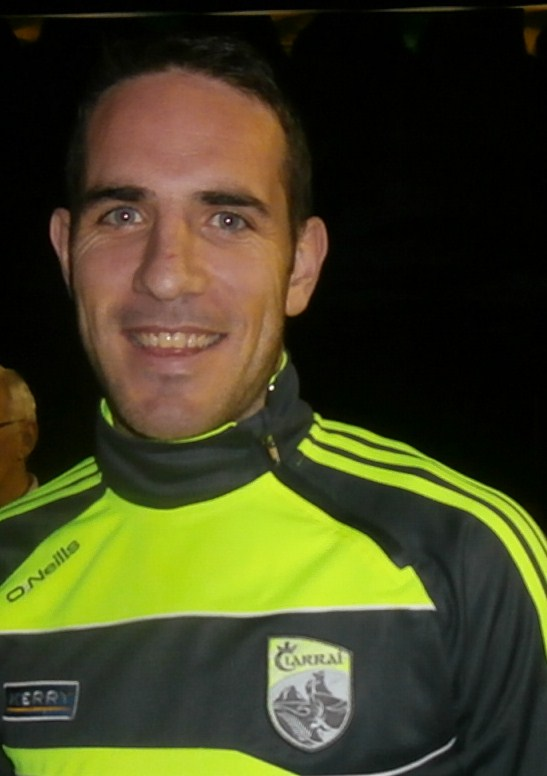
Declan O'Sullivan captained Kerry to back-to-back All-Ireland SFC titles in 2006 and 2007. This was a rare occurrence back then.

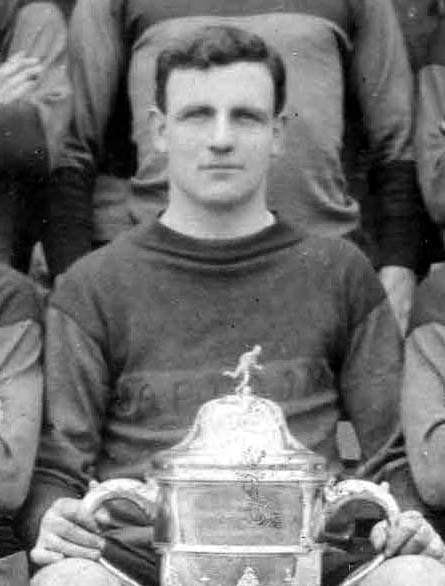
Seán O'Kennedy captained Wexford to several All-Ireland SFC titles in the 1910s.

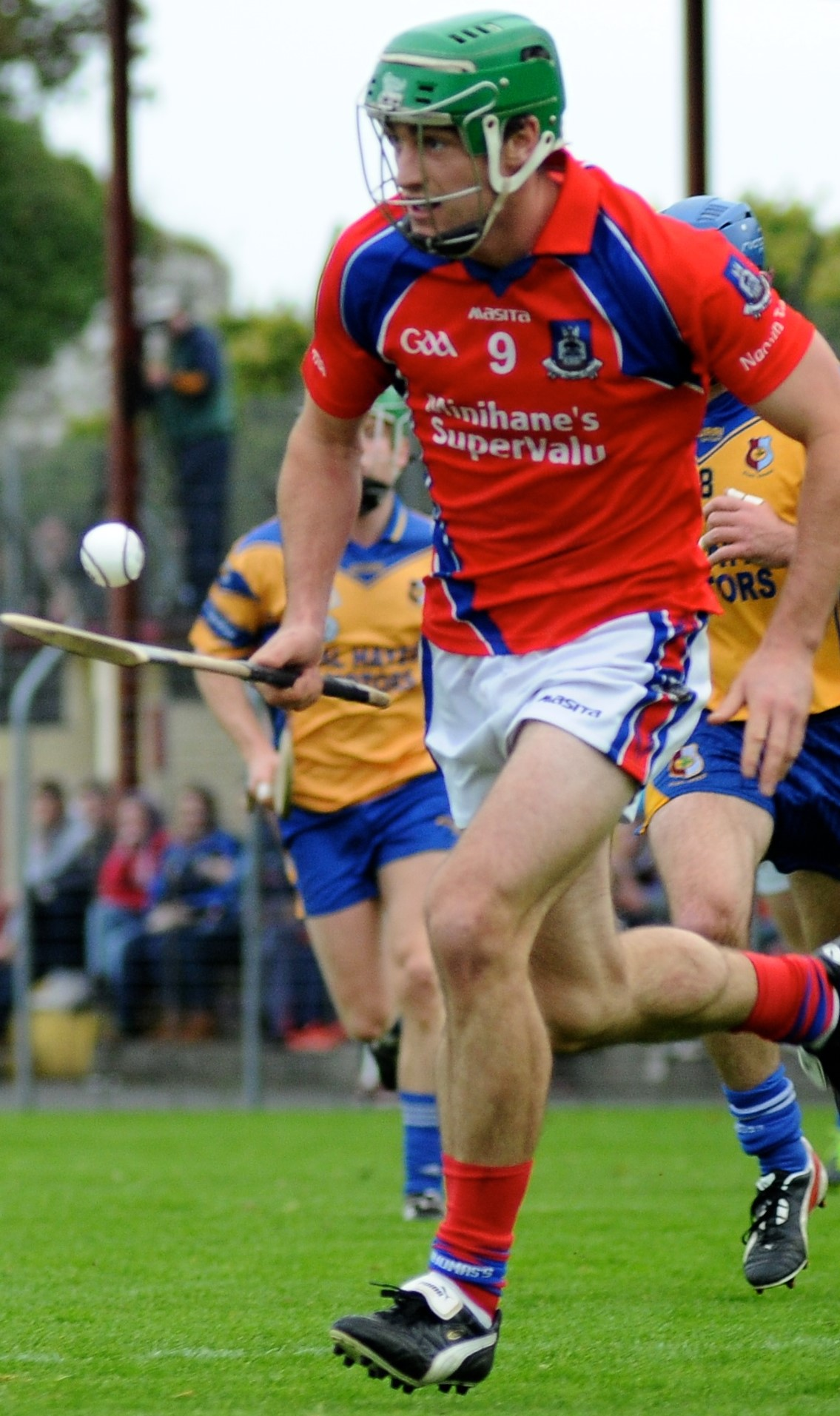
David Burke, seen here playing for his local club, captained Galway to the All-Ireland SHC in 2017.

A captain of a Gaelic games team, sometimes known as a skipper, is a player who, during the course of a match as well as before and after it, has several additional roles and responsibilities over and above those of his teammates.

Tradition means that some teams rotate the captaincy annually, though others may adopt a permanent captain. As well as being an onfield leader, a captain takes the coin toss and raises the trophy when this is the game's prize.

== Responsibilities ==
The captain leads the team out onto the pitch.

Before the start of a match, a coin toss between captains of the opposing teams is used to determine which end of the ground each team will kick to.

Ahead of the All-Ireland final, the captain is the first member of the team to shake the hand of dignitaries who may be attending the game, for example the president of the GAA or the president of Ireland. He then proceeds along the red carpet and introduces the other players on his team to the president(s), who then shake that player's hand.

It is tradition following an All-Ireland final that the captain raises the Sam Maguire Cup (in football) or Liam MacCarthy Cup (in hurling) first before handing the trophy to his teammates. The captain is required to make a speech, including thanking the opposition team.

== Rotation ==
Traditionally, the captaincy of a county team has been rotated annually among different players, meaning that most captains may lead their team to one All-Ireland and/or Provincial Championship (occasionally two), even when their county teams have been dominant.

Kerry maintain the tradition of having the Kerry Senior Football Championship winning club nominate their captain each season.

Kilkenny do likewise regarding the Kilkenny Senior Hurling Championship.

This has increasingly become a disadvantage as the manager of the county team does not get to make the decision.

== Permanence ==
The idea of a permanent captain of a county team was introduced by Jim McGuinness when he named Michael Murphy "to succeed Kevin Cassidy as captain of Donegal for the 2011 season" (as the BBC stated at the time) after taking over as Donegal manager in 2010. Murphy, in an unprecedented development, held the captaincy throughout McGuinness's time in charge (until 2014) and then became the first to hold it throughout a second manager's time in charge (Rory Gallagher: 2014–2017). When Declan Bonner took over as manager in 2017 he retained Murphy as captain. Murphy reached a decade as captain in 2021.

Jim Gavin upon taking over as Dublin manager, adopted a similar practice by naming Stephen Cluxton as his captain. This allowed Cluxton to become the first man to captain a team to three All-Ireland Senior Football Championships (2013, 2015, 2016). Cluxton won eight All-Ireland SFC titles, seven of which were achieved as captain (2013, 2015, 2016, 2017, 2018, 2019, 2020), as well as the 2011 All-Ireland SFC when Bryan Cullen was captain.

Declan Hannon became the first person to lift hurling's Liam MacCarthy Cup on four occasions as captain in 2022 (following 2018, 2020 and 2021). He did so alongside the injured Cian Lynch, who later revealed that he was not anticipating Hannon asking him to lift the trophy with him.

== Joint-captains ==
The 2021 GAA Congress outlawed the possibility of joint-captains, which had crept into the games over the previous decade, raising a trophy.

Kerry football captains Kieran O'Leary and Fionn Fitzgerald raised the Sam Maguire Cup together in 2014.

A young supporter with cancer helped Dr Crokes captain Johnny Buckley raise the Andy Merrigan Cup after the 2017 All-Ireland Senior Club Football Championship final.

Coalisland captain Stephen McNally performed a similar gesture with a supporter after the 2018 Tyrone Senior Football Championship final.

Corofin joint-captains Micheál Lundy and Ciarán McGrath raised the Andy Merrigan Cup together after the 2018–19 All-Ireland Senior Club Football Championship final.

Wexford hurling captains Matthew O'Hanlon and Lee Chin raised the Bob O'Keefe Cup together in 2019.

Ballymun Kickhams players James McCarthy and John and Paddy Small all raised the trophy together after winning the 2020 Dublin Senior Football Championship.

The Limerick footballers persisted with joint captains in 2021, ignoring the earlier vote at Congress.

Cork won the 2021 Munster Minor Football Championship, with joint captains Rory O'Shaughnessy and Hugh O'Connor both raising the trophy afterwards.

== See also ==
- Captain (sports)
- List of All-Ireland Senior Football Championship winning captains
- List of All-Ireland Senior Hurling Championship winning captains
