= 2017 Longford Senior Football Championship =

Longford S.F.C.
- Season: 2017
- Champions: Mullinalaghta (4th title)
- Relegated: Fr. Manning Gaels; St. Brigid's Killashee
- Winning Captain: Shane Mulligan
- Man of the Match: Rian Brady
- Winning Manager: Mickey Graham
- Matches played: 31

The 2017 Longford Senior Football Championship was the 101st running of the Longford GAA's premier club Gaelic football tournament for senior graded teams in County Longford, Ireland since the first County Championship was held in 1890 (100 completed since 1890, 1 started but not completed in 1891). The 2017 tournament consisted of 12 teams, with the winner going on to represent Longford in the Leinster Senior Club Football Championship. The championship starts with a group stage and then progresses to a knock out stage.

Mullinalaghta St. Columba's were the defending champions after they defeated Abbeylara in the previous year's final. In the final, they repeated their victory over the same opponents, retaining their title for the first time ever.

This year St. Brigid's Killashee returned to the senior grade after a 3-season absence since relegation in 2013 after claiming the 2016 Longford Intermediate Football Championship title, However they made the straight drop back down to the middle grade after finishing bottom of their group this year. Fr. Manning Gaels also joined them in the middle tier for the first time in 42 years, after losing their Relegation Play-off final.

== Team changes ==
The following teams have changed division since the 2016 championship season.

=== To S.F.C. ===
Promoted from 2016 Longford Intermediate Football Championship

- St Brigid's Killashee – (Intermediate Champions)

=== From S.F.C. ===
Relegated to 2017 Longford Intermediate Football Championship

- Rathcline

== Group stage ==
All 12 teams entered the competition at this stage. Groups A and B each consisted of 4 seeded teams (the previous year's quarter-finalists) with 3 teams from each group progressing to the quarter-finals. Group C consisted of the 5 unseeded teams (seeding based on the previous year's performance). 2 teams from Group C proceeded to the quarter-finals while the bottom finisher was relegated to the 2018 I.F.C. 3rd and 4th in Group C played off in a Relegation final to decide the second team to be relegated.

=== Group A ===
| Team | Pld | W | L | D | PF | PA | PD | Pts |
|---|---|---|---|---|---|---|---|---|
| Mullinalaghta St Columba's | 3 | 3 | 0 | 0 | 58 | 40 | +18 | 6 |
| Killoe Young Emmets | 3 | 1 | 1 | 1 | 55 | 56 | -1 | 3 |
| Dromard | 3 | 1 | 2 | 0 | 49 | 53 | -4 | 2 |
| Longford Slashers | 3 | 0 | 2 | 1 | 45 | 58 | -13 | 1 |

Round 1:

- Mullinalaghta St Columba's 2-19, 2-8 Longford Slashers, 22/7/2017,
- Killoe Young Emmets 2-19, 2-14 Dromard, 23/7/2017,

Round 2:

- Mullinalaghta St Columba's 1-11, 1-10 Dromard, 29/7/2017,
- Killoe Young Emmets 1-14, 2-11 Longford Slashers, 30/7/2017,

Round 3:

- Mullinalaghta St Columba's 3-10, 0-13 Killoe Young Emmets, 11/8/2017
- Dromard 1-13, 2-8 Longford Slashers, 12/8/2017

=== Group B ===
| Team | Pld | W | L | D | PF | PA | PD | Pts |
|---|---|---|---|---|---|---|---|---|
| Abbeylara | 3 | 2 | 1 | 0 | 44 | 31 | +13 | 4 |
| Clonguish | 3 | 2 | 1 | 0 | 50 | 46 | +4 | 4 |
| Mostrim | 3 | 2 | 1 | 0 | 48 | 50 | -2 | 4 |
| Carrickedmond | 3 | 0 | 3 | 0 | 35 | 50 | -15 | 0 |

Round 1:

- Mostrim 3-11, 1-13 Clonguish, 21/7/2017,
- Abbeylara 1-10, 0-6 Carrickedmond, 22/7/2017,

Round 2:

- Abbeylara 1-14, 0-10 Mostrim, 29/7/2017,
- Clonguish 2-13, 2-6 Carrickedmond, 30/7/2017,

Round 3:

- Clonguish 1-12, 0-14 Abbeylara 13/8/2017
- Mostrim 2-12, 1-14 Carrickedmond, 13/8/2017

=== Group C ===
| Team | Pld | W | L | D | PF | PA | PD | Pts |
|---|---|---|---|---|---|---|---|---|
| Colmcille | 4 | 4 | 0 | 0 | 71 | 55 | +16 | 8 |
| Ballymahon | 4 | 2 | 1 | 1 | 61 | 48 | +13 | 5 |
| Fr. Manning Gaels | 4 | 2 | 1 | 1 | 58 | 50 | +8 | 5 |
| St Mary's Granard | 4 | 1 | 3 | 0 | 49 | 65 | -16 | 2 |
| St Brigid's Killashee | 4 | 0 | 4 | 0 | 51 | 72 | -21 | 0 |

Round 1:

- St Mary's Granard 2-10, 0-10 St Brigid's Kilashee, 15/7/2017,
- Fr. Manning Gaels 1-8, 1-8 Ballymahon, 15/7/2017,
- Colmcille – Bye,

Round 2:

- Colmcille 0-12, 0-9 Fr. Manning Gaels, 23/7/2017,
- Ballymahon 4-9, 1-6 St Mary's Granard, 23/7/2017,
- St Brigid's Killashee – Bye,

Round 3:

- Ballymahon 0-12, 1-6 St Brigid's Killashee 28/7/2017,
- Colmcille 1-14, 2-9 St Mary's Granard, 30/7/2017,
- Fr. Manning Gaels – Bye,

Round 4:

- Colmcille 3-14, 2-8 St. Brigid's Killashee, 5/8/2017,
- Fr. Manning Gaels 1-14, 0-9 St. Mary's Granard, 5/8/2017,
- Ballymahon – Bye,

Round 5:

- Fr. Manning Gaels 1-18, 2-12 St Brigid's Killashee, 12/8/2017
- Colmcille 2-13, 2-11 Ballymahon, 12/8/2017
- St Mary's Granard – Bye,

== Knockout stage ==
The top 8 teams from the league stages qualify for the quarter-finals. The winners of Groups A and B are kept on opposite sides of the draw.

| Quarter-Finals | | Semi-Finals | | Final |
| Mullinalaghta St Columba's | 1-12 (2-8) |
| Killoe Young Emmets | 0-8 (0-14) | Mullinalaghta St Columba's | 0-15 (1-11) |
| Dromard | 0-15 | Clonguish | 0-8 (0-14) |
| Clonguish | 1-14 | | | Mullinalaghta St Columba's | 0-13 |
| Ballymahon | 0-12 | | | Abbeylara | 1-7 |
| Mostrim | 1-16 | Mostrim | 2-12 |
| Colmcille | 0-14 | Abbeylara | 3-13 |
| Abbeylara | 0-15 |

== Quarter-finals ==
| 26 August 2017; 18:45; Quarter-Final | Mullinalaghta | 2-8 – 0-14 | Killoe Young Emmets | Pearse Park, Longford; Referee: Patrick Maguire (St Mary’s Granard) |
| 26 August 2017; 18:45; Quarter-Final | David McGivney 0-5f, John Keegan and James McGivney 1-0, Rian Brady 0-2, Aidan McElligott 0-1 | Report | Sean McCormack 0-4 (0-2f), Larry Moran 0-3, Daniel Mimnagh (1 '45), Denis McGoldrick (0-1f), Mark Hughes 0-2 each, Mickey Quinn 0-1 | Pearse Park, Longford; Referee: Patrick Maguire (St Mary’s Granard) |

| 27 August 2017; 18:30; Quarter-Final | Clonguish | 1-14 – 0-15 | Dromard | Pearse Park; Referee: Michael Farrell (Ballymahon) |
| 27 August 2017; 18:30; Quarter-Final | Joe O'Brien 0-7 (0-6f), Paul Barden 1-2, Paddy Dowd 0-2f, David Barden, Chris Gordon, Ciaran Williams 0-1 each | Report | Francie McGee 0-7 (0-5f), Jamsie Martin 0-4 (0-3f), John Sheridan 0-2, Ronan McEntire and Cian Mimnagh 0-1 each | Pearse Park; Referee: Michael Farrell (Ballymahon) |

| 2 September 2017; 18:30; Quarter-Final | Ballymahon | 0-12 – 1-16 | Mostrim | Pearse Park; Referee: Gerard Carberry (Killoe Emmet Og) |
| 2 September 2017; 18:30; Quarter-Final | Colm Flynn 0-5 (0-4f), Joe Kelly 0-3 (2 '45, 0-1f), Thomas Mulvihill and Kyle Fitzmaurice 0-2 each | Report | David Morgan 1-6, Cillian Lynn 0-4 (0-2f), Brian Farrell 0-3, Darragh Doherty 0-2 (0-1f), Gerard Smith 0-1 | Pearse Park; Referee: Gerard Carberry (Killoe Emmet Og) |

| 3 September 2017; 18:30; Quarter-Final | Colmcille | 0-14 – 0-15 | Abbeylara | Pearse Park; Referee: Donal Kane (Young Grattans) |
| 3 September 2017; 18:30; Quarter-Final | Rory Hawkins 0-6 (0-3f), Barry McKeon 0-4 (0-2f), Cathal Reilly 0-2, Gerry Mulligan (1 '45) and Declan Reilly 0-1 each | Report | Robbie Smyth 0-13 (0-9f), Jason Kelly and Padraig Berry 0-1 each | Pearse Park; Referee: Donal Kane (Young Grattans) |

| 3 September 2017; 16:45; Quarter-Final Replay | Mullinalaghta | 1-12 – 0-8 | Killoe Young Emmets | Pearse Park; Referee: Aiden Dowler (Moydow Harpers) |
| 3 September 2017; 16:45; Quarter-Final Replay | Jayson Matthews 0-6 (0-4f), Rian Brady 1-1, James McGivney 0-3, Dónal McElligott and David McGivney (0-1f) 0-1 each | Report | Mark Hughes 0-3 (0-1f), Padraig McCormack, Paddy Kiernan, Daniel Mimnagh, Séamus McCormack, Ciaran Donohoe 0-1 each | Pearse Park; Referee: Aiden Dowler (Moydow Harpers) |

== Semi-finals ==
| 16 September 2017; 18:00; Semi-Final | Mullinalaghta | 1-11 – 0-14 | Clonguish | Pearse Park; Referee: Patrick Maguire (St Mary's Granard) |
| 16 September 2017; 18:00; Semi-Final | David McGivney 0-5f, Conor McElligott 1-0, Jayson Matthews 0-2 (0-1f), Dónal McElligott, James McGivney, Rian Brady, Michael Cunningham 0-1 each | Report | Joe O'Brien 0-7 (0-4f), Paddy Dowd 0-3, Ciaran Williams 0-2, Paul Barden and Stephen Nortion 0-1 each | Pearse Park; Referee: Patrick Maguire (St Mary's Granard) |

| 23 September 2017; 17:45; Semi-Final | Abbeylara | 3-13 – 2-12 | Mostrim | Pearse Park; Referee: Fergal Kelly (Ballymahon) |
| 23 September 2017; 17:45; Semi-Final | Conor Berry 2-1, Robbie Smyth 0-6 (0-3f), Jason Kelly 0-4 (0-3f), Fergal Battrim 1-0, Brian Smyth and Bernard Crawford (1 '45) 0-1 each | Report | Brian Farrell (0-2f) and David Morgan 1-3 each, Cillian Lynn (0-2f) and Darragh Doherty (0-1f) 0-3 each | Pearse Park; Referee: Fergal Kelly (Ballymahon) |

| 23 September 2017; 15:45; Semi-Final Replay | Mullinalaghta | 0-15 – 0-8 | Clonguish | Pearse Park; Referee: Ger Egan (St Mary’s Granard) |
| 23 September 2017; 15:45; Semi-Final Replay | Jayson Matthews 0-6 (0-2f), David McGivney 0-2, Dónal McElligott, Shane Mulligan, Conan Brady, John Keegan, Rian Brady, James McGivney, Conor McElligott 0-1 each | Report | Joe O'Brien 0-5 (0-4f), David Barden 0-2, Colin Farrell 0-1 | Pearse Park; Referee: Ger Egan (St Mary’s Granard) |

== Final ==
| 8 October 2017; 4:00 pm Final | Mullinalaghta | 0-13 – 1-7 | Abbeylara | Pearse Park; Attendance: 4,215; Referee: Aidan Dowler (Moydow Harpers); Man of the Match: Rian Brady |
| 8 October 2017; 4:00 pm Final | Rian Brady 0-4, David McGivney (0-2f), James McGivney, Conor McElligott 0-2 each, Conan Brady, Donal McElligott, Jayson Matthews (0-1f) | Report | Robbie Smyth 1-4 (1-0 pen, 0-4f), James McEntire, Barry Smyth, Jason Kelly (0-1f) 0-1 each | Pearse Park; Attendance: 4,215; Referee: Aidan Dowler (Moydow Harpers); Man of the Match: Rian Brady |

== Relegation Playoff ==
=== Relegation Final ===
| 25 August 2017 | St Mary's Granard | 2-18 – 1-10 | Fr. Manning Gaels | McGann Park, Kenagh; Referee: Aiden Dowler |
