= 2018 Antrim Senior Football Championship =

Gaelic football competition

Antrim SFC
- Season: 2018
- Champions: Erin's Own Cargin (8th title)
- Relegated: St Joseph's (12th in S.F.L.)

The 2018 Antrim Senior Football Championship is the 117th official edition of Antrim GAA's premier club gaelic football tournament for senior clubs in County Antrim. 12 teams compete with the winners receiving the Padraig McNamee Cup and representing Antrim in the Ulster Senior Club Football Championship. The Antrim championship has a straight knock-out format.

St Brigid's returned to the senior championship in 2018 after a one year exodus.

Lámh Dhearg were the defending champions after they defeated St John's in the 2017 final.

St Joseph's Glenavy were relegated after finishing 12th respectively in the S.F.L.

On 21 October 2018, Erin's Own Cargin claimed their 8th S.F.C. when defeating Creggan Kickhams 0-5 to 0-4 in the final at Ahoghill.

== Team changes ==
=== Promoted from 2017 I.F.C. ===
- St Brigid's - (I.F.C. Champions)

=== Relegated to 2018 I.F.C. ===
- St Paul's - (11th in S.F.L.)
- St James' - (12th in S.F.L.)

== Round 1 ==
8 of the 12 senior clubs play in this round. The 4 winners and the 4 teams who received byes compete in the quarter-finals. The 4 losing teams exit the championship.

- Ahoghill 2-10, 1-12 St Brigid's, Ballymena, 8/9/2018,
- St Teresa's 2-12, 1-7 St Joseph's, Stewartstown Avenue, 8/9/2018,
- Portglenone 3-13, 3-8 O'Donovan Rossa, Creggan, 9/9/2018,
- Lámh Dhearg 2-15, 0-9 Aghagallon, Glenavy, 9/9/2018,

== Quarter-finals ==
- Creggan Kickhams 4-13, 0-8 Ahoghill, Ballymena, 21/9/2018,
- St Gall's 3-11, 1-8 Portglenone, 22/9/2018,
- St John's 3-14, 0-9 St. Teresa's, Stewartstown Avenue, 23/9/2018,
- Erin's Own Cargin 0-13, 2-7 Lámh Dhearg, Creggan, 23/9/2018,
- Erin's Own Cargin 0-11, 0-5 Lámh Dhearg, Corrigan Park, 30/9/2018, (Replay)

== Semi-finals ==
06/10/2018; 16:30; Semi-Final	Erin's Own Cargin	2.17 - 4.10	St Gall's	Creggan; Referee: Sean Laverty

07/10/2018; 16.30; Semi-Final	Creggan Kickhams	2-9 - 1-10	St John's	Glenavy; Referee: Brendan Toland

== Final ==
21/10/2018; 15:30; Final	Erins Own Cargin	0-5 - 0-4	Creggan Kickhams	Ahoghill; Referee: Karol Doherty
