= Micheál Lundy =

Irish Gaelic footballer

Micheál Lundy is an Irish Gaelic footballer who plays for Corofin and the Galway county team. He was joint-captain with Ciarán McGrath for his club's run of three consecutive All-Ireland Club SFC titles between 2018 and 2020.

When Alan Mulholland was manager, Lundy scored Galway's opening point and, later, a goal during his team's 2014 All-Ireland Senior Football Championship quarter-final exit to Kerry at Croke Park. Later, when Kevin Walsh was manager, Lundy was sent off in the 2017 Connacht Senior Football Championship final defeat to Roscommon. His involvement in Galway's early season league games has been curtailed due to his club Corofin's advances through to the latter stages of the All-Ireland Club SFC.
