= 2018 Laois Senior Football Championship =

Laois S.F.C.
- Season: 2018
- Champions: Portlaoise (34th S.F.C. Title)
- Relegated: Clonaslee–St Manman's Gaels
- Winning Captain: Paul Cahillane
- Man Of The Match: Ricky Maher
- Winning Manager: Malachy McNulty
- Matches: 30

The 2018 Laois Senior Football Championship was the 128th edition of the Laois GAA's premier club Gaelic football tournament for senior graded teams in County Laois, Ireland. The tournament consisted of 16 teams with the winner going on to represent Laois in the Leinster Senior Club Football Championship. The championship had a back-door format for the first two rounds before proceeding to a knock-out format. Generally, any team to lose two matches will be knocked out of the championship.

Portlaoise were the defending champions after they defeated Ballylinan in the previous years final. They successfully defended their title to claim a "2-in-a-row" of victories when they defeated O'Dempsey's in this years final.

Emo made a straight return to the senior grade after just one year outside the top flight.

This was the second season running in which Clonaslee–St Manman's amalgamated with Annanough for their championship matches as Clonaslee Gaels (however unlike 2017, Annanough didn't field a side in the 2018 I.F.C.). Both clubs fielded separate reserve sides in the Laois J.F.C. 'C'. The amalgamation suffered relegation at the end of the 2018 campaign and so will ply their trade in the 2019 I.F.C.

== Team changes ==
The following teams have changed division since the 2017 championship season.

=== To S.F.C. ===
Promoted from 2017 Laois I.F.C.

- Emo – (Intermediate Champions)

=== From S.F.C. ===
Relegated to 2018 Laois I.F.C.

- Mountmellick

== Round 1 ==
All 16 teams enter the competition in this round. The 8 winners progress to Round 2A, while the 8 losers progress to Round 2B.

- Arles–Kilcruise 2-15, 2-14 Stradbally, 25/7/2018,
- Ballylinan 1-12, 1-10 Crettyard Gaels, 26/7/2018,
- Portlaoise 3-22, 2-8 Ballyfin Gaels, 28/7/2018,
- Killeshin 2-8, 1-9 Clonaslee–St Manman's Gaels, 29/7/2018,
- Emo 1–12, 1-12 Arles–Killeen, 29/7/2018,
- Portarlington 1-11, 0-12 Ballyroan/Abbey, 29/7/2018,
- St Joseph's 2-12, 1-9 The Heath, 28/7/2018,
- Graiguecullen 2-11, 0-13 O'Dempsey's, 29/7/2018,
- Emo 1-20, 3-6 Arles–Killeen, 1/8/2018 (Replay),

== Round 2 ==
=== Round 2A ===
The 8 winners from Round 1 enter this round. The 4 winners from this round will enter the draw for the quarter-finals, while the 4 losers will play in Round 3.

- Portlaoise 1-16, 0-9 Graiguecullen, 10/8/2018,
- Killeshin 1-16, 0-12 Ballylinan, 11/8/2018,
- St Joseph's 1-15, 0-10 Portarlington, 12/8/2018,
- Emo 1-15, 1-13 Arles–Kilcruise, 12/8/2018,

=== Round 2B ===
The 8 losers from Round 1 enter this round. The 4 winners from this round will go into Round 3, while the 4 losers will enter the Relegation Playoffs.

- Crettyard Gaels 0-14, 0-11 Ballyfin Gaels, 9/8/2018,
- O'Dempsey's 4-14, 0-12 Arles–Killeen, 11/8/2018,
- Stradbally 4-12, 0-7 Clonaslee–St Manman's Gaels, 12/8/2018,
- Ballyroan Abbey 3-8, 1-11 The Heath, 12/8/2018,

== Round 3 ==
The 4 losers from Round 2A enter this round and play the 4 winners from Round 2B. The 4 winners from this round will go into the draw for the quarter-finals.

- Ballyroan Abbey 1–11, 0-14 Arles–Kilcruise, 22/8/2018,
- O'Dempsey's 1–15, 1-15 Ballylinan, 24/8/2018,
- Stradbally 2-13, 0-13 Portarlington, 25/8/2018,
- Graiguecullen 0-21, 0-10 Crettyard Gaels, 25/8/2018,
- Ballyroan Abbey 1-12, 0-14 Arles–Kilcruise, 28/8/2018 (Replay),
- O'Dempsey's 2-12, 1-14 Ballylinan, 29/8/2018, (Replay),

== Quarter-finals ==
The quarter-finals will eliminate four teams, leaving 4 teams. These teams will face off against each other in the semi-finals.

- Graiguecullen 1–12, 1-12 Killeshin, 14/9/2018,
- O'Dempsey's 1-13, 0-10 Emo, 15/9/2018,
- Portlaoise 2-17, 0-9 Ballyroan Abbey, 16/9/2018,
- St Joseph's 0-15, 1-10 Stradbally, 16/9/2018,
- Graiguecullen 2-15, 2-12 Killeshin, 20/9/2018, (Replay),

== Semi-finals ==
In the semi-finals, two further teams will be eliminated, leaving the best from each set to play each other in the Final.

- O'Dempsey's 2-13, 0-14 Graiguecullen, 30/9/2018,
- Portlaoise 4-15, 1-9 St Joseph's, 30/9/2018,

== Final ==
The remaining two teams play against each other to determine the champion.

- Portlaoise2-16–1-13O'Dempsey's

== Relegation playoff ==
=== Relegation Semi-Finals ===
- The Heath 2-13, 2-10 Ballyfin Gaels, 26/8/2018,
- Arles–Killeen 2-15, 1-8 Clonaslee–St Manman's Gaels, 26/8/2018,

=== Relegation Final ===
- Ballyfin Gaels 2-13, 1-12 Clonaslee–St Manman's Gaels, 16/9/2018,
