= 2018 Waterford Senior Football Championship =

Waterford S.F.C.
- Season: 2018
- Champions: The Nire (9th S.F.C. Title)
- Relegated: Dungarvan

The 2018 Waterford Senior Football Championship is the 131st edition of the Waterford GAA's premier club Gaelic football tournament for senior graded clubs in County Waterford, Ireland. The tournament consists of 12 teams, with the winner going on to represent Waterford in the Munster Senior Club Football Championship. The championship starts with a stage and then progresses to a knock out stage.

Stradbally were the defending champions after they defeated The Nire in the previous years final. However the defence of their title came undone at the quarter-final stage when losing to neighbours Kilrossanty.

This was Dungarvan's return to the senior grade after claiming the 2017 Waterford I.F.C. title. This was their first year back in the top-flight of Waterford club football in 5 years since relegation at the end of the 2012 season.

On 28 October 2018, The Nire claimed their 9th Waterford S.F.C. crown when defeating Kilrossanty by 0-9 to 0-7 in the final at Fraher Field.

Dungarvan were relegated to the 2019 I.F.C. after losing their Relegation Final to Ardmore St. Declan's. This ended their one year stay in the senior ranks.

== Team changes ==
The following teams have changed division since the 2017 championship season.

=== To S.F.C. ===
Promoted from 2017 Waterford I.F.C.

- Dungarvan - (Intermediate Champions)

=== From S.F.C. ===
Relegated to 2018 Waterford I.F.C.

- Ballinameela

== Group stage ==
All 12 teams enter the competition at this stage. Groups are organised into three groups of four teams. The previous year's champions must enter Group 1, the previous year's runners-up must enter Group 2 while the two beaten semi-finalists will both enter Group 3.

The top placed team in each group will qualify directly for the quarter-finals joined by the 2nd placed team with the best group record. The best 2nd placed team shall be decided on following criteria: 1. Total points won in the group; 2. Best scoring difference; 3. Total scores for; 4. Total goals scored; 5. Where teams still cannot be separated, a draw shall take place. No play-offs shall be used.

The remaining eight teams shall then be divided into two pots. Pot A is to consist of the remaining 2nd placed teams plus the two 3rd placed teams with the best group record. The best 3rd placed teams shall be decided on the same criteria as outlined above. Pot B shall consist of the remaining 4 teams.

A draw will take place to give four matches with no repeat of group matches allowed. The four winners will advance to Quarter-Finals to oppose the four teams already qualified in a seeded draw. The four losers are to contest the relegation play-offs.

=== Group 1 ===
Team	Pld	W	L	D	PF	PA	PD	Pts
Stradbally	3	3	0	0	56	37	+22	6
Portlaw	3	2	1	0	33	36	-3	4
Dungarvan	3	1	2	0	47	46	+1	2
Ardmore	3	0	3	0	33	50	-17	0

Round 1

- Portlaw 0-9, 0-6 Dungarvan, 14/4/2018,
- Stradbally 1-12, 0-7 Ardmore, 14/4/2018,

Round 2

- Stradbally 1-17, 1-10 Portlaw, 21/4/2018,
- Dungarvan 2-18, 2-10 Ardmore, 21/4/2018,

Round 3

- Portlaw 1-8, 1-7 Ardmore, 12/7/2018,
- Stradbally 3-12, 2-11 Dungarvan, 14/7/2018,

=== Group 2 ===
Team	Pld	W	L	D	PF	PA	PD	Pts
Ballinacourty	3	2	1	0	48	30	+18	4
The Nire	3	2	1	0	60	47	+13	4
Clashmore	3	2	1	0	48	54	-6	4
Brickey Rangers	3	0	3	0	41	66	-25	0

Round 1

- The Nire 6-5, 1-10 Clashmore, 15/4/2018,
- Ballinacourty 2-14, 0-4 Brickey Rangers, 15/4/2018,

Round 2

- Clashmore 1-13, 2-9 Ballinacourty, 21/4/2018,
- The Nire 4-15, 4-9 Brickey Rangers, 21/4/2018,

Round 3

- Clashmore 1-16, 3-7 Brickey Rangers, 12/7/2018,
- Ballinacourty 1-10, 0-10 The Nire, 15/7/2018,

=== Group 3 ===
Team	Pld	W	L	D	PF	PA	PD	Pts
Rathgormack	3	3	0	0	58	35	+23	6
Kilrossanty	3	1	1	1	44	39	+5	3
An Rinn	3	0	1	2	29	39	-10	2
Gaultier	3	0	2	1	32	50	-18	1

Round 1

- Rathgormack 2-11, 1-6 Gaultier, 14/4/2018,
- Kilrossanty 0-7, 0-7 An Rinn, 15/4/2018,

Round 2

- An Rinn 0-11, 0-11 Gaultier, 21/4/2018,
- Rathgormack 3-11, 2-9 Kilrossanty, 21/4/2018,

Round 3

- Kilrossanty 2-16, 1-9 Gaultier, 13/7/2018,
- Rathgormack 4-9, 0-11 An Rinn, 14/7/2018,

== Finals ==
=== Preliminary Quarter-Finals ===
All eight teams who failed to finish top of their group (except for the 2nd placed team with the best group record) shall enter the Preliminary Quarter-Finals. Teams are divided into two pots. Pot A is to consist of the remaining 2nd placed teams plus the two 3rd placed teams with the best group record. The best 3rd placed teams shall be decided on the same criteria as outlined above. Pot B shall consist of the remaining 4 teams.

A draw will take place to give four matches with no repeat of group matches allowed. The four winners will advance to Quarter-Finals to oppose the four teams already qualified in a seeded draw. The four losers are to contest the relegation play-offs.

- Clashmore/Kinsalebeg 0-20, 0-18 Dungarvan, Fraher Field, 28/7/2018,
- Kilrossanty 4-14, 1-7 Brickey Rangers, Fraher Field, 29/7/2018,
- Rathgormack 1-16, 0-8 Ardmore, Fraher Field, 31/7/2018,
- Gaultier 2-13, 2-7 Portlaw, Leamybrien, 2/8/2018,

=== Quarter-finals ===
The three teams who topped their groups along with the best ranked 2nd placed team will face the four Preliminary Quarter-Final winners in the quarter-finals.

7 September 2018; Quarter-Final	An Rinn	3-11 - 0-19	Clashmore/Kinsalebeg	Fraher Field, Dungarvan; Referee: ??? Man of the Match: ???

8 September 2018; Quarter-Final	Ballinacourty	2-16 - 0-10	Gaultier	Leamybrien; Referee: ??? Man of the Match: ???

9 September 2018; Quarter-Final	Kilrossanty	2-14 - 0-12	Stradbally	Fraher Field; Referee: Alan Kissane

9 September 2018; Quarter-Final	Nire	1-18 - 2-10 (a.e.t.)	Rathgormack	Fraher Field; Referee: ??? Man of the Match: ???

=== Semi-finals ===
30 September 2018; 6:30PM; Semi-Final	Kilrossanty	3-16 - 0-12	An Rinn	Fraher Field; Referee: Tommy Sullivan

21 October 2018; Semi-Final	The Nire	2-11 - 2-9	Ballinacourty	Fraher Field; Referee: ??? Man of the Match: ???

=== Final ===
28 October 2018; Final	The Nire	0-9 - 0-7	Kilrossanty	Fraher Field; Referee: ??? Man of the Match: ???

== Relegation play-offs ==
The four losers from the Preliminary Quarter-Finals enter the Relegation Semi-Finals. The two winners of these Semi-Finals will secure their senior status for 2019 while the two losers will face each other in the Relegation Final. The winner of this match will secure their senior status for 2019 while the loser will be relegated to next year's I.F.C.

Relegation Semi-Finals:

- Brickey Rangers 3-9, 0-15 Dungarvan, Fraher Field, 9/9/2018,
- Portlaw 1-18, 0-14 Ardmore, Fraher Field, 29/9/2018,

Relegation Final:

- Ardmore 2-14, 1-6 Dungarvan, Fraher Field, 12/10/2018.
