= Ciarán McGrath =

Galway Gaelic footballer

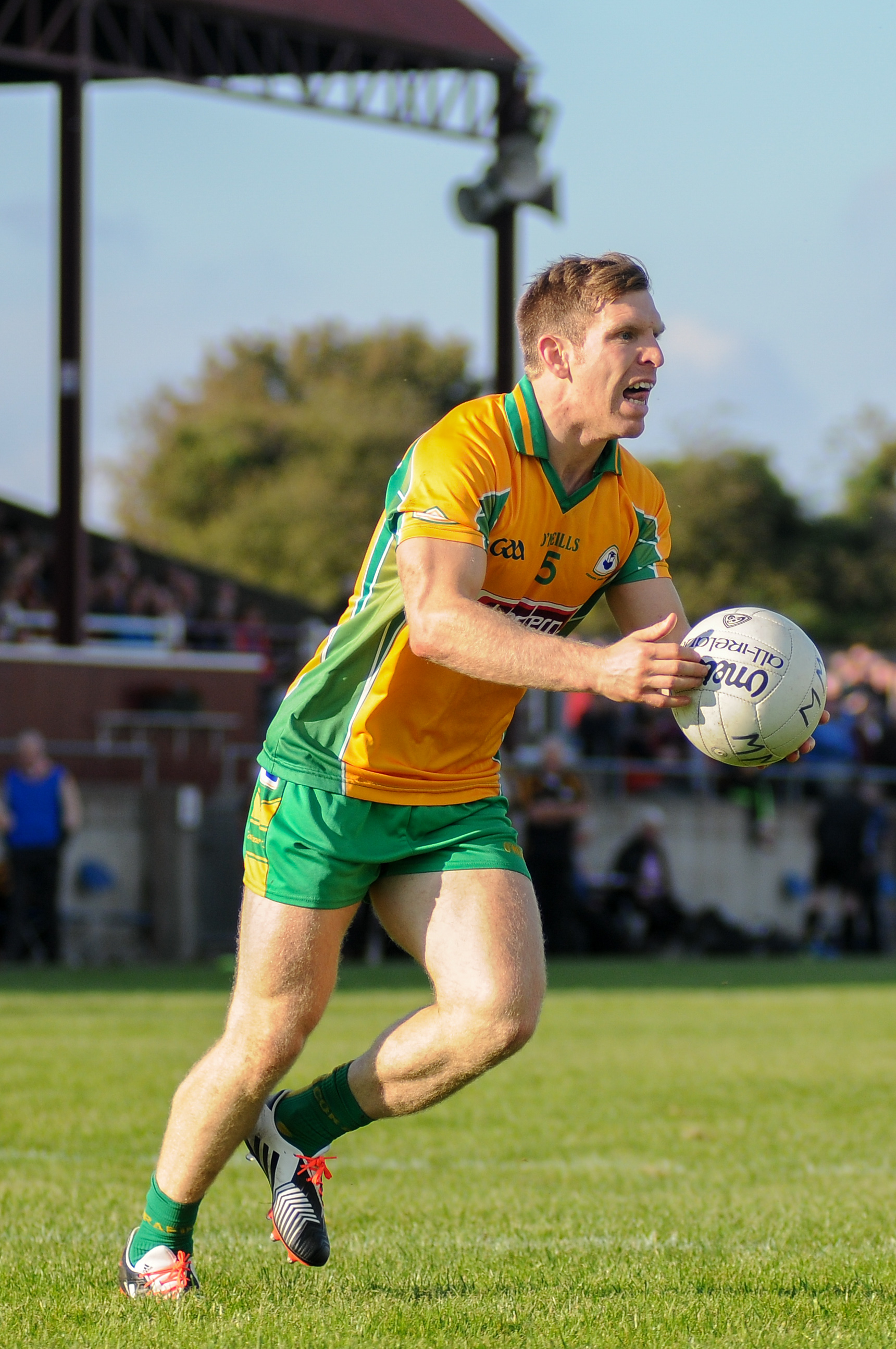
- Ciarán McGrath in 2015

Personal information
- Native name: Ciarán Mac Craith (Irish)
- Nickname: Giz
- Born: 25 February 1985 (age 41) Galway, Ireland
- Occupation: Garda
- Height: 1.78 m (5 ft 10 in)

Sport
- Sport: Gaelic Football
- Position: Right half back
Club
- Years: Club
- 2003–: Corofin
Club titles
- Galway titles: 7
- Connacht titles: 4
- All-Ireland Titles: 4
Inter-county
- Years: County
- 2012–2014: Galway

Ciarán McGrath (born 25 February 1985) is an Irish Gaelic footballer who plays for Corofin and the Galway county team

McGrath made his championship debut for Galway in the 2012 Connacht SFC quarter-final against Roscommon.

With Corofin, McGrath was involved in its second All-Ireland Senior Club Football Championship title in 2015. He was joint-captain with Micheál Lundy for his club's run of three consecutive All-Ireland Club SFC titles between 2018 and 2020.
