= Gary Sice =

Galway and Corofin Gaelic footballer

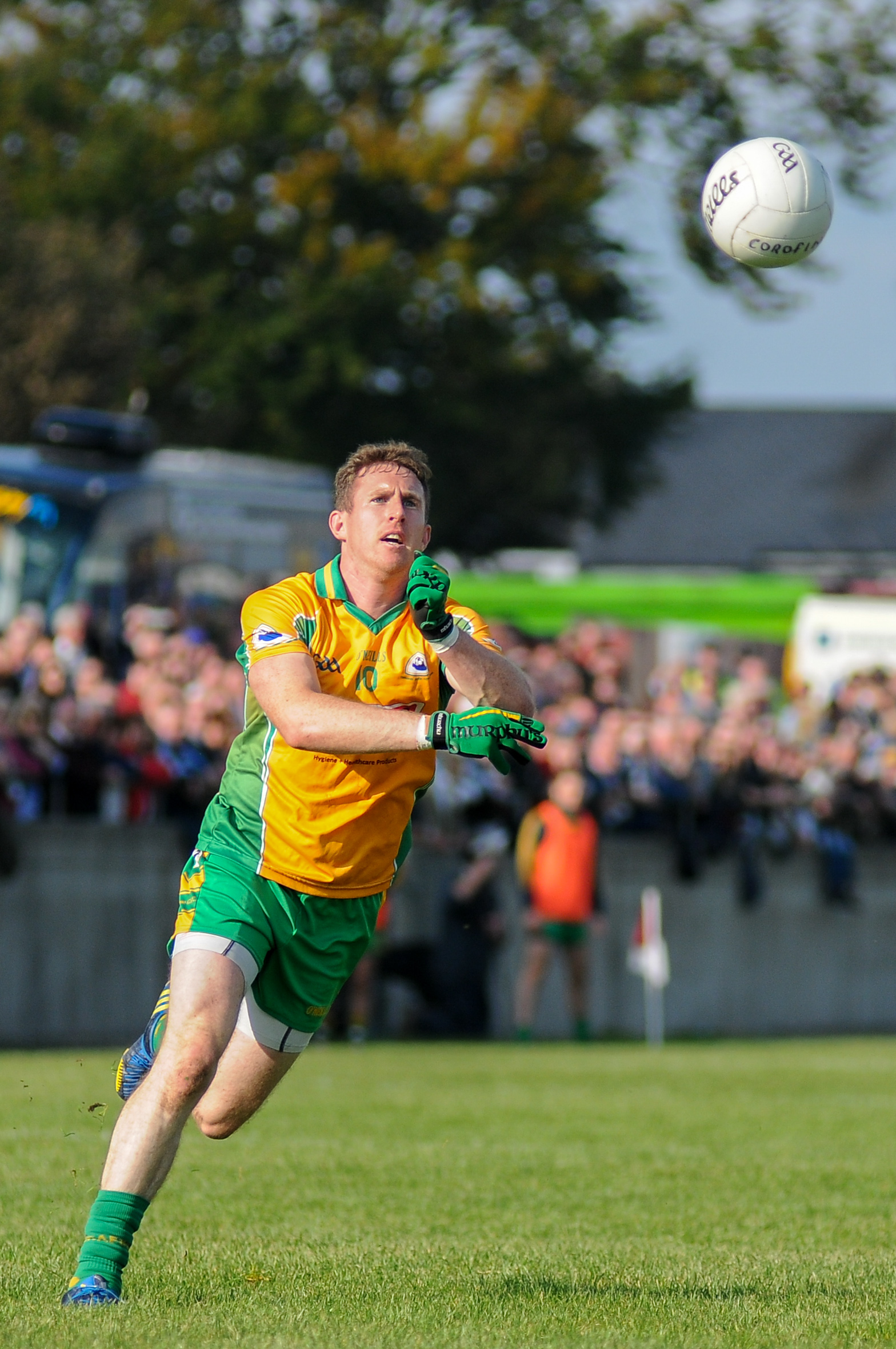
- Gary Sice in 2015

Personal information
- Native name: Garrai Ó Saigheas (Irish)
- Born: 8 November 1984 (age 41) Galway, Ireland
- Height: 1.83 m (6 ft 0 in)

Sport
- Sport: Gaelic Football
- Position: Right Half Forward
Club
- Years: Club
- 2003–: Corofin
Club titles
- Galway titles: 14
- Connacht titles: 5
- All-Ireland Titles: 1
Inter-county*
Years	County	Apps (scores)
2007–2017; 2020	Galway	94 (6-85)
Inter-county titles
- Connacht titles: 2
- NFL: 1 (Division 2)
- *Inter County team apps and scores correct as of 15 November 2020.

Gary Sice (born 8 November 1984) is a Gaelic footballer who plays for his local club, Corofin, and, formerly, at senior level for the Galway county team from 2007 until 2017.

Sice was a key member of the St Jarlath's College team that won the Hogan Cup in 2002 beating St Michael's College, Enniskillen on a scoreline of 3–13 to 0–6 along with Michael Meehan, Niall Coleman, Darren Mullahy, Alan Burke whom he also lined out with for Galway in later years and James Kavanagh, who also lined out for both Kildare and Galway.

The then Galway manager Kevin Walsh confirmed Sice's retirement from the inter-county scene on 8 January 2018, after a postponed FBD Insurance League game against Mayo due to have taken place at MacHale Park.

After briefly returning in 2020, Sice had left the Galway panel by 2021.

His wife, Bevin Sice (née Grant, from Piltown in County Kilkenny) died in 2022, following an illness.

== Honours ==
St Jarlath's College

- Hogan Cup (1): 2002

Corofin

- Galway Senior Football Championship (14): 2006, 2008, 2009, 2011, 2013, 2014, 2015, 2016, 2017, 2018, 2019, 2020, 2023, 2024
- Connacht Senior Club Football Championship (7): 2008, 2009, 2014, 2016, 2017
- All-Ireland Senior Club Football Championship (4)

Galway

- Connacht Under-21 Football Championship (1): 2005
- All-Ireland Under-21 Football Championship (1): 2005
- Connacht Senior Football Championship (2): 2008, 2016
