= 2018 Longford Senior Football Championship =

Longford S.F.C.
- Season: 2018
- Champions: Mullinalaghta (5th title)
- Relegated: Ballymahon
- Winning Captain: Shane Mulligan
- Man of the Match: David McGivney
- Winning Manager: Mickey Graham
- Matches: 27

The 2018 Longford Senior Football Championship is the 102nd running of the Longford GAA's premier club Gaelic football tournament for senior graded teams in County Longford, Ireland since the first County Championship was held in 1890 (101 completed since 1890, 1 started but not completed in 1891). The 2018 tournament consisted of 11 teams, with the winner going on to represent Longford in the Leinster Senior Club Football Championship. The championship starts with a group stage and then progresses to a knock out stage.

Mullinalaghta St Columba's retained their title in the final, defeating Abbeylara after a replay to become the first team to win three successive titles since Fr. Manning Gaels in 1998. They went on to become the first Longford club to reach the Leinster Club Senior Football final and the first Longford club to be crowned Leinster champions with victory over Kilmacud Crokes. Mullinalaghta made history by competing in the All Ireland Club Semi-Final, losing out to Dr Crokes.

This year the number of teams was reduced to 11 after the 2017 Intermediate champions, Rathcline, opted to remain at that grade rather than be promoted. The relegation playoffs scheduled to determine which team would be regraded to Intermediate were cancelled after Ballymahon decided to withdraw and go down to Intermediate for 2019.

== Team changes ==
The following teams have changed division since the 2017 championship season.

=== From S.F.C. ===
Relegated to 2018 Longford Intermediate Football Championship

- St Brigid's Killashee
- Fr. Manning Gaels

== Group stage ==
All 11 teams entered the competition at this stage. Groups A and B each consisted of 4 teams with 3 teams from each group progressing to the quarter-finals and last year's finalists being kept apart. Group C consisted of 3 teams, with 2 teams proceeding to the quarter-finals. The bottom finishers in each group were to play off to decide relegation to the 2019 I.F.C.

=== Group A ===
| Team | Pld | W | L | D | PF | PA | PD | Pts |
|---|---|---|---|---|---|---|---|---|
| Clonguish | 3 | 2 | 0 | 1 | 51 | 33 | +18 | 5 |
| Mostrim | 3 | 1 | 1 | 1 | 33 | 37 | -4 | 3 |
| Abbeylara | 3 | 1 | 1 | 1 | 51 | 35 | +15 | 3 |
| Ballymahon | 3 | 0 | 2 | 1 | 26 | 55 | -29 | 1 |

Round 1:

- Ballymahon 0-12, 1-9 Mostrim, 20/7/2018,
- Abbeylara 0-17, 1-14 Clonguish, 21/7/2018,

Round 2:

- Ballymahon 0-4, 0-20 Abbeylara, 29/7/2018,
- Clonguish 1-8, 0-6 Mostrim, 29/7/2018,

Round 3:

- Clonguish 1-20, 1-7 Ballymahon, 18/8/2018,
- Mostrim 1-12, 1-11 Abbeylara, 18/8/2018,

=== Group B ===
| Team | Pld | W | L | D | PF | PA | PD | Pts |
|---|---|---|---|---|---|---|---|---|
| Mullinalaghta St Columba's | 3 | 3 | 0 | 0 | 69 | 30 | +39 | 6 |
| Colmcille | 3 | 2 | 1 | 0 | 53 | 49 | +4 | 2 |
| St Mary's Granard | 3 | 1 | 2 | 0 | 46 | 54 | -8 | 2 |
| Carrickedmond | 3 | 0 | 3 | 0 | 37 | 72 | -35 | 0 |

Round 1:

- Mullinalaghta St Columba's 2-17, 0-8 Colmcille, 20/7/2018,
- St Mary's Granard 2-17, 2-6 Carrickedmond, 21/7/2018,

Round 2:

- Colmcille 4-13, 1-11 Carrickedmond, 27/7/2018,
- St Mary's Granard 0-11, 2-16 Mullinalaghta St Columba's, 29/7/2018,

Round 3:

- Colmcille 1-17, 1-9 St Mary's Granard, 19/8/2018,
- Carrickedmond 1-8, 1-21 Mullinalaghta St Columba's, 19/8/2018,

=== Group C ===
| Team | Pld | W | L | D | PF | PA | PD | Pts |
|---|---|---|---|---|---|---|---|---|
| Dromard | 2 | 1 | 0 | 1 | 28 | 27 | +1 | 3 |
| Killoe Young Emmets | 2 | 1 | 1 | 0 | 27 | 24 | +3 | 2 |
| Longford Slashers | 2 | 0 | 1 | 1 | 26 | 30 | -4 | 1 |

Round 1:

- Dromard 1-12, 2-9 Longford Slashers, 22/7/2018,
- Killoe Young Emmets - Bye,

Round 2:

- Longford Slashers 0-11, 0-15 Killoe Young Emmets, 28/7/2018,
- Dromard - Bye,

Round 3:

- Killoe Young Emmets 0-12, 1-10 Dromard, 19/8/2018,
- Longford Slashers - Bye,

== Knockout stage ==
The top 8 teams from the league stages qualify for the quarter-finals.

| Quarter-Finals | | Semi-Finals | | Final |
| Killoe Young Emmets | 1-8 |
| Abbeylara | 1-11 | Abbeylara | 1-10 |
| Colmcille | 1-10 | Colmcille | 0-10 |
| St Mary's Granard | 0-9 | | | Abbeylara | 1-2 (0-6) |
| Mostrim | 0-9 | | | Mullinalaghta St Columba's | 2-14 (0-6) |
| Mullinalaghta St Columba's | 1-11 | Mullinalaghta St Columba's | 0-12 |
| Clonguish | 2-9 (0-13) | Clonguish | 1-6 |
| Dromard | 1-7 (2-7) |

== Quarter-finals ==
| 01/09/2018; 6.30 p.m. Quarter-Final | Killoe Young Emmets | 1-8 - 1-11 | Abbeylara | Pearse Park, Longford; Referee: Fergal Kelly |
| 01/09/2018; 6.30 p.m. Quarter-Final | Sean McCormack 1-2 (0-2f), Denis McGoldrick 0-2, Mark Hughes, Daniel Mimnagh, Eamon Keogh, Ciaran Donohoe 0-1 each | Report | Padraig Berry 1-1, Jason Kelly 0-3, Nigel Rabbitte 0-3 (0-1f), Barry McKiernan 0-1f, Brian Smyth, Conor Berry, Cian Brady 0-1 each | Pearse Park, Longford; Referee: Fergal Kelly |

| 01/09/2018; 5.00 p.m. Quarter-Final | Colmcille | 1-10 - 0-9 | St Mary's Granard | Pearse Park; Referee: Dónal Kane |
| 01/09/2018; 5.00 p.m. Quarter-Final | Ruairi Harkin 1-1, Rory Hawkins 0-3, Paul McKeon 0-3 (0-2f), Gerard Mulligan, Barry McKeon, Cathal McCabe 0-1 each | Report | Darren Gallagher 0-5 (0-3f), Derek Sheridan 0-3f, Mark Tully 0-1 | Pearse Park; Referee: Dónal Kane |

| 08/09/2018; 6.30 p.m. Quarter-Final | Mostrim | 0-9 - 1-11 | Mullinalaghta St Columba's | Pearse Park; Referee: Mark Glancy |
| 08/09/2018; 6.30 p.m. Quarter-Final | Darragh Doherty 0-3 (0-2f), Brian Farrell 0-2f, Seamus Hannon, Evan Murphy, Sean Noone, Gerard Smith 0-1 each. | Report | Jayson Matthews 1-1, James McGivney 0-4, Donal McElligott 0-2, David McGivney 0-2 (0-1f), Rian Brady, Aidan McElligott 0-1 each | Pearse Park; Referee: Mark Glancy |

| 09/09/2018; 6.30 p.m. Quarter-Final | Clonguish | 0-13 - 2-7 | Dromard | Pearse Park; Referee: Aidan Dowler |
| 09/09/2018; 6.30 p.m. Quarter-Final | Joe O'Brien 0-10 (0-8f), Paul Barden 0-2, Kevin Burke 0-1 | Report | Cian Mimnagh 2-0, Francis McGee 0-3 (0-1f), Jamesie Martin 0-3 (0-1f), Ronan McEntire 0-1 | Pearse Park; Referee: Aidan Dowler |

| 16/09/2018; 1.45 p.m. Quarter-Final Replay | Clonguish | 2-9 - 1-7 | Dromard | Pearse Park; Referee: Fergal Kelly |
| 16/09/2018; 1.45 p.m. Quarter-Final Replay | Joe O'Brien 0-5 (0-4f), David Barden, Darragh McLoughlin 1-0 each, Peter Hanley, Shane O'Brien, Darren Quinn, Conor Shields 0-1 each | Report | Cian Mimnagh 1-0, Joe Hagan 0-3, Francis McGee 0-3f, Jamesie Martin 0-1f | Pearse Park; Referee: Fergal Kelly |

== Semi-finals ==
| 16/09/2018; 3.30 p.m. Semi-Final | Abbeylara | 1-10 - 0-10 | Colmcille | Pearse Park; Referee: Aidan Dowler |
| 16/09/2018; 3.30 p.m. Semi-Final | Conor Berry 1-1, Nigel Rabbitte 0-3 (0-2f), Barry McKiernan 0-2 (0-1f), Fergal Battrim, PJ Masterson, Brian Smyth, Cian Brady 0-1 each | Report | Barry McKeon 0-3 (0-2f), Paul McKeon 0-3f, Ruairi Harkin 0-2, Rory Hawkins 0-1f, Declan Farrell 0-1 | Pearse Park; Referee: Aidan Dowler |

| 22/09/2018; 5.30 p.m. Semi-Final | Mullinalaghta St Columba's | 0-12 - 1-6 | Clonguish | Pearse Park; Referee: Patrick Maguire |
| 22/09/2018; 5.30 p.m. Semi-Final | Jayson Matthews 0-4, David McGivney 0-3 (0-1f), Rian Brady 0-3 (0-2f), Shane Mulligan, Donal McElligott 0-1 each. | Report | Joe O'Brien 0-5 (0-4f), Conor Shields 1-0, David Barden 0-1. | Pearse Park; Referee: Patrick Maguire |

== Final ==
| 07/10/2018; 4.00 p.m. Final | Abbeylara | 0-6 - 0-6 | Mullinalaghta St Columba's | Pearse Park; Referee: Donal Kane |
| 07/10/2018; 4.00 p.m. Final | Nigel Rabbitte 0-4 (0-1f), Jason Kelly 0-1, Barry McKiernan 0-1f | Report | Rian Brady 0-2f, David McGivney 0-1, Dónal McElligott 0-1, Gary Rogers 0-1'45' | Pearse Park; Referee: Donal Kane |

| 14/10/2018; 3.45 p.m. Final replay | Abbeylara | 1-2 - 2-14 | Mullinalaghta St Columba's | Pearse Park; Referee: Fergal Kelly; Man of the Match: David McGivney |
| 14/10/2018; 3.45 p.m. Final replay | Colm P. Smyth 1-0, Robbie Smyth 0-1, Nigel Rabbitte 0-1f | Report | Rian Brady 1-3, Shane Mulligan 1-1, Jayson Matthews 0-3, David McGivney 0-3f, Michael Cunningham Jr. 0-2, Brendan Fox 0-1, John Keegan 0-1 | Pearse Park; Referee: Fergal Kelly; Man of the Match: David McGivney |

== Relegation playoff ==
Ballymahon, Carrickedmond and Longford Slashers were scheduled to play off in a three-team group, with the bottom team being relegated to Intermediate for 2019. However, after the draw had been made, Ballymahon decided to withdraw and voluntarily regrade to Intermediate for the following season.
